= 2002 Wandsworth London Borough Council election =

2002 local election in England

- 2 May 2002

All 61 seats up for election to Wandsworth London Borough Council 31 seats needed for a majority
- Registered: 210,364
- Turnout: 62,581, 29.75% (▼9.63)
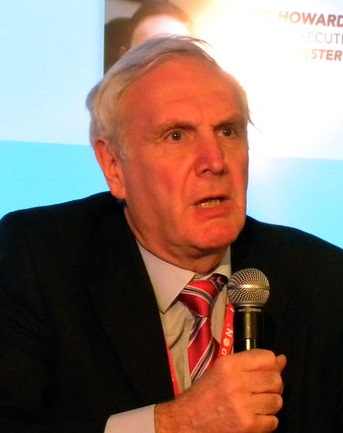

	First party	Second party	Third party
Leader	Edward J.U. Lister	Unknown	Unknown
Party	Conservative	Labour	Liberal Democrats
Leader since	1992	Unknown	Unknown
Leader's seat	Thamesfield	Unknown	Unknown
Last election	50 seats, 53.42%	11 seats, 36.55%	0 seats, 8.55%
Seats before	49	11	0
Seats won	50	10	0
Seat change	Steady	▼1	Steady
Popular vote	95,535	59,635	16,155
Percentage	53.70%	33.52%	9.08%
Swing	▲0.28	▼3.03	▲0.53
- Map of the results of the 2002 Wandsworth council election. Conservatives in blue and Labour in red.
Council control before election
Conservative
Council control after election
Conservative

The 2002 Wandsworth London Borough Council election took place on 2 May 2002 to elect members of Wandsworth London Borough Council in London, England. The whole council was up for election with boundary changes since the last election in 1998 reducing the number of seats by 1. The Conservative party stayed in overall control of the council.

The election saw an experiment in leaving polling stations open for a longer period. Along with neighbouring Westminster City Council polling stations were open from 7 am to 10 pm instead of the standard 8 am to 9 pm.

== Background ==
As part of a major redistricting, Wandsworth council along with every other London Council created new districts, eliminated some, and expanded others. The results of this redistricting were as follows:

=== Wards Created ===
- Wandsworth Common (3) - Created from parts of Earlsfield, Fairfield, Springfield and St John wards

=== Wards Eliminated ===
- Parkside (2) - Absorbed by West Hill ward
- St John (3) - Land divided among Fairfield, Latchmere and St Mary's Park wards as well as part of the new Wandsworth Common ward
- Springfield (3) - Land divided between Earlsfield ward and the new Wandsworth Common ward

=== Wards Expanded ===
- Earlsfield - increased from 2 to 3 seats
- Fairfield - increased from 2 seats to 3
- Queenstown - Increased from 2 seats to 3
- West Hill - Increased from 2 seats to 3

=== Wards Renamed ===
- Southfield (3) - renamed to Southfields ward

During the process of redistrictinng, the number of seats on Wandworth London Borough Council dropped from 61 to 60.

In the years between this election and the previous one there were 2 by-elections triggered by the resignation and deaths of their respective councillors, however neither of them resulted in the seats changing parties. In addition to this there was a single seat that became vacant without enough time to hold a by-election to fill it, which meant the composition of the council just before the election was as follows:

↓
11	49	1
Labour	Conservative	Vacant

== Election result ==
-Wandsworth local election result 2002
Party	Seats	Gains	Losses	Net gain/loss	Seats %	Votes %	Votes	+/−
Conservative	50	8 (Note: Gains include 10 new seats either added to existing wards or created for new wards and losses are just from wards that were eliminated)	8	Steady	83.33	53.70	95,535	▲0.28
Labour	10	0	1	▼1	16.67	33.52	59,635	▼3.03
Liberal Democrats	0	0	0	Steady	0.00	9.08	16,155	▲0.53
Green	0	0	0	Steady	0.00	2.76	4,917	▲1.28
Independent	0	0	0	Steady	0.00	0.86	1,532	New
London Socialist	0	0	0	Steady	0.00	0.04	76	New
CPA	0	0	0	Steady	0.00	0.03	58	New
Total	60						177,908	

After the election, the composition was as follows:

↓
10	50
Labour	Conservative

== Ward results ==
(*) - Indicates an incumbent candidate

(†) - Indicates an incumbent candidate standing in a different ward

=== Balham ===
Balham (3)
Party	Candidate	Votes	%	±%
Conservative	Richard Longmore* (Note: Longmore was elected in a by-election triggered by the resignation of Cllr Andrew White in 1999)	1,686	59.46	▲4.64
Conservative	Bernadina Ayonrinde*	1,676		
Conservative	Charles Walker	1,672		
Labour	Christopher Cooke	749	25.12	▼6.80
Labour	Sally Gear	713		
Labour	Harvey Heath	665		
Liberal Democrats	Matthew Green	274	8.86	▲2.00
Liberal Democrats	Siobhan Vitelli	248		
Green	Robert Baker	231	6.56	▲0.17
Liberal Democrats	Christian Moon	228		
Green	Albert Vickery	166		
Green	Graham Humphreys	158		
Registered electors		10,615		▲1,355
Turnout		2,914	27.45	▼13.86
Rejected ballots		5	0.17	▼0.14
Conservative win (new boundaries)				
Conservative win (new boundaries)				
Conservative win (new boundaries)				

=== Bedford ===
Bedford (3)
Party	Candidate	Votes	%	±%
Conservative	Stewart Finn*	1,394	38.92	▼9.09
Conservative	Antonia Dunn	1,366		
Conservative	Sheldon Wilkie*	1,276		
Labour	Nicholas Bowes	1,254	32.12	▼6.35
Labour	Peter Carpenter	1,057		
Labour	James Whiting	1,019		
Green	John Rattray	533	15.42	▲7.91
Liberal Democrats	Henrietta Norman	468	13.54	▲7.51
Registered electors		10,463		▲821
Turnout		2,991	28.59	▼11.88
Rejected ballots		6	0.20	▼0.36
Conservative win (new boundaries)				
Conservative win (new boundaries)				
Conservative win (new boundaries)				

=== Earlsfield ===
Earlsfield (3)
Party	Candidate	Votes	%	±%
Conservative	Angela Graham*	1,743	48.81	▼5.74
Conservative	Marc Hope	1,684		
Conservative	Charles McNaught-Davis*	1,607		
Labour	Peter Max	1,246	35.95	▲0.07
Labour	Sophie Livingstone	1,232		
Labour	Leonie Cooper	1,230		
Liberal Democrats	Stephanie Dearden	282	7.44	▲2.80
Liberal Democrats	Abigail Irving	256		
Liberal Democrats	Andrew Gilbert	229		
Green	Dorothy Horsler	210	6.11	
CPA	Cynthia Harry	58	1.69	New
Registered electors		10,536		▲3,805
Turnout		3,412	32.38	▲11.33
Rejected ballots		5	0.15	▼0.19
Conservative win (new boundaries)				
Conservative win (new boundaries)				
Conservative win (new seat)				

=== East Putney ===
East Putney (3)
Party	Candidate	Votes	%	±%
Conservative	Diana Whittingham*	1,870	63.35	▲1.47
Conservative	Leslie McDonnell*	1,866		
Conservative	Brian Prichard*	1,846		
Labour	Scott Knox	741	24.47	▼2.88
Labour	Richard Moir	729		
Labour	Alan Petrides	686		
Liberal Democrats	Tracy Harris	402	12.18	▲1.41
Liberal Democrats	James Durrant	341		
Liberal Democrats	Jeremy Clery	330		
Registered electors		10,888		▲585
Turnout		3,021	27.75	▼7.98
Rejected ballots		3	0.10	▼0.25
Conservative win (new boundaries)				
Conservative win (new boundaries)				
Conservative win (new boundaries)				

=== Fairfield ===
Fairfield (3)
Party	Candidate	Votes	%	±%
Conservative	Vanessa Graham*	1,642	53.32	▼10.37
Conservative	Piers McCausland^{†} (Note: McCausland was a sitting councillor representing the St John ward)	1,564		
Conservative	Tessa Strickland*	1,536		
Labour	Victoria Anifowoshe	738	23.98	▼6.77
Labour	Brendan McMullan	723		
Labour	Tom Wright	672		
Liberal Democrats	Patrick Warren	360	12.14	▲6.58
Green	Martin Williams	313	10.56	New
Registered electors		10,321		▲4,326
Turnout		2,709	26.25	▼18.22
Rejected ballots		3	0.11	▼0.27
Conservative win (new boundaries)				
Conservative win (new boundaries)				
Conservative win (new seat)				

=== Furzedown ===
Furzedown (3)
Party	Candidate	Votes	%	±%
Labour	John Farebrother*	1,727	41.78	▼3.79
Conservative	Colin Dawe^{†} (Note: Dawe was a sitting councillor representing the Bedford ward)	1,696	41.60	▼2.02
Conservative	Andrew Halford	1,651		
Labour	Vibert Luthers	1,608		
Labour	Peter Marsden	1,606		
Conservative	Toufic Batal	1,572		
Green	Donald Valentine	395	10.02	▲4.74
Liberal Democrats	Derek Elsley	298	6.60	▲1.07
Liberal Democrats	Simon Parritt	253		
Liberal Democrats	Richard Williams	229		
Registered electors		10,430		▲74
Turnout		3,863	37.04	▼5.65
Rejected ballots		12	0.31	▼0.48
Labour win (new boundaries)				
Conservative win (new boundaries)				
Conservative win (new boundaries)				

=== Graveney ===
Graveney (3)
Party	Candidate	Votes	%	±%
Labour	Andrew Gibbons*	1,434	41.83	▼4.04
Labour	Pamela Tatlow*	1,290		
Labour	Thakur Hosain*	1,277		
Liberal Democrats	Sarah Cole	1,165	33.05	▲2.36
Liberal Democrats	Nicholas Lowe	1,048		
Liberal Democrats	Amanda Wells	948		
Conservative	Samantha Hurley	536	16.68	▲0.04
Conservative	David de Winton	532		
Conservative	Guy Hurley^{†} (Note: Hurley was a sitting councillor representing the Balham ward)	527		
Green	Marian Hoffman	269	8.44	▲1.64
Registered electors		10,737		▲204
Turnout		3,220	29.99	▼4.61
Rejected ballots		6	0.19	▼0.06
Labour win (new boundaries)				
Labour win (new boundaries)				
Labour win (new boundaries)				

=== Latchmere ===
Latchmere (3)
Party	Candidate	Votes	%	±%
Labour	Anthony Belton*	1,365	48.16	▼2.17
Labour	Maurice Johnson*	1,351		
Labour	Bhavna Joshi	1,215		
Conservative	Jeremy Parkinson	953	33.79	▼10.34
Conservative	George Smith	915		
Conservative	David Walden	890		
Liberal Democrats	Alan Giles	221	8.12	▲2.58
Green	Michael Day	194	7.13	New
London Socialist	Stephen McNaughton	76	2.79	New
Registered electors		10,174		▲1,931
Turnout		2,633	25.88	▼5.84
Rejected ballots		8	0.30	▼0.04
Labour win (new boundaries)				
Labour win (new boundaries)				
Labour win (new boundaries)				

=== Nightingale ===
Nightingale (3)
Party	Candidate	Votes	%	±%
Conservative	Katharine Lindsay	1,891	48.49	▼2.63
Conservative	Maurice Heaster*	1,875		
Conservative	Ravindra Govindia*	1,832		
Labour	Anthony Langan	1,045	25.76	▼11.05
Labour	Misbah Islam	990		
Labour	Martin Tupper	939		
Green	Bruce Mackenzie	497	12.91	▲6.95
Liberal Democrats	Timothy Knight	494	12.84	▲6.73
Registered electors		10,895		▲1,351
Turnout		3,440	31.57	▼9.90
Rejected ballots		3	0.09	▼0.36
Conservative win (new boundaries)				
Conservative win (new boundaries)				
Conservative win (new boundaries)				

=== Northcote ===
Northcote (3)
Party	Candidate	Votes	%	±%
Conservative	Philip Beddows^{†} (Note: Beddows was a sitting councillor representing the Shaftesbury ward)	1,940	60.43	▼1.40
Conservative	Martin Johnson*	1,895		
Conservative	Gordon Passmore*	1,853		
Labour	Margaret McCabe	674	20.10	▼4.45
Labour	Gordon Paterson	616		
Labour	Thomas Grinyer	602		
Liberal Democrats	Christine Green	344	9.20	▲1.30
Liberal Democrats	Charles Cronin	330		
Green	Richmond Crowhurst	322	10.27	▲4.55
Liberal Democrats	James Sparling	192		
Registered electors		10,714		▲1,614
Turnout		3,030	28.28	▼12.19
Rejected ballots		4	0.13	▼0.06
Conservative win (new boundaries)				
Conservative win (new boundaries)				
Conservative win (new boundaries)				

=== Queenstown ===
Queenstown (3)
Party	Candidate	Votes	%	±%
Conservative	Scott Caisley	1,390	49.27	New
Conservative	Deidre Church	1,362		
Conservative	David Nurse	1,279		
Labour	Michael Hipwell	1,194	41.97	New
Labour	Anna Steinitz	1,128		
Labour	Erica Trim	1,112		
Liberal Democrats	Ashley Jones	239	8.76	New
Registered electors		9,849		New
Turnout		2,776	28.19	New
Rejected ballots		14	0.50	New
Conservative win (new boundaries)				
Conservative win (new boundaries)				
Conservative win (new seat)				

=== Roehampton ===
Roehampton (3)
Party	Candidate	Votes	%	±%
Conservative	Andrew Penfold	1,668	46.96	▼2.60
Conservative	Paul Reeve	1,612		
Conservative	Ryan Robson	1,581		
Labour	Pauline Brueseke	1,402	38.77	▼3.46
Labour	Elizabeth McNeil	1,375		
Labour	Martin Spence	1,236		
Liberal Democrats	Valerie Shelmerdine	291	7.29	▼0.92
Green	Polly Moore	241	6.98	New
Liberal Democrats	Godfrey Shockey	212		
Registered electors		10,276		▼1,432
Turnout		3,387	32.96	▼4.78
Rejected ballots		6	0.18	▲0.06
Conservative win (new boundaries)				
Conservative win (new boundaries)				
Conservative win (new boundaries)				

=== St Mary's Park ===
St Mary's Park (3)
Party	Candidate	Votes	%	±%
Conservative	Mark Davies	1,650	55.10	▼0.88
Conservative	John Hallmark*	1,597		
Conservative	Simon Williams*	1,521		
Labour	Paul Peters	747	24.31	▼7.99
Labour	Joan Cawston	715		
Labour	Maureen Walsh	641		
Green	William Charlton	369	12.79	▲5.66
Liberal Democrats	David Owen-Jones	227	7.80	▲3.21
Liberal Democrats	Christopher Woodley	223		
Registered electors		10,366		▼1,243
Turnout		2,725	26.29	▼14.04
Rejected ballots		2	0.07	▼0.31
Conservative win (new boundaries)				
Conservative win (new boundaries)				
Conservative win (new boundaries)				

=== Shaftesbury ===
Shaftesbury (3)
Party	Candidate	Votes	%	±%
Conservative	James Cousins*	1,640	51.26	▼2.86
Conservative	John Senior*	1,619		
Conservative	John Ellis	1,571		
Labour	Elisabeth Davies	914	28.05	▼5.86
Labour	William McDonald	873		
Labour	Nigel Goldsmith	856		
Green	Sebastian Berry	357	11.37	▲4.99
Liberal Democrats	David Patterson	293	9.33	▲3.74
Registered electors		10,770		▲674
Turnout		2,861	26.56	▼11.22
Rejected ballots		2	0.07	▼0.06
Conservative win (new boundaries)				
Conservative win (new boundaries)				
Conservative win (new boundaries)				

=== Southfields ===
Southfields (3)
Party	Candidate	Votes	%	±%
Conservative	Simon Roberts	1,913	52.66	New
Conservative	Janice Leigh^{†} (Note: Leigh was a sitting councillor representing the Southfield ward)	1,899		
Conservative	Richard Vivian^{†} (Note: Vivian was a sitting councillor representing the Queenstown ward)	1,898		
Labour	Sarah Richards	946	24.30	New
Labour	Beth Lamont	918		
Labour	Morgan McSweeney	771		
Liberal Democrats	Anna Ahmed	470	11.26	New
Independent	June Hautot	426	11.78	New
Liberal Democrats	Anthony Burrett	404		
Liberal Democrats	Thomas Cheetham	347		
Registered electors		10,983		New
Turnout		3,490	31.78	New
Rejected ballots		5	0.14	New
Conservative win (new seat)				
Conservative win (new seat)				
Conservative win (new seat)				

=== Thamesfield ===
Thamesfield (3)
Party	Candidate	Votes	%	±%
Conservative	Roger Bird*	1,838	46.19	▼17.87
Conservative	Edward Lister*	1,834		
Conservative	James Maddan	1,768		
Labour	Christopher Locke	663	16.85	▼7.63
Labour	Christopher Shephard	661		
Labour	John Slater	660		
Independent	John Horrocks	627	15.97	New
Independent	Christine Reeves	479	12.20	New
Liberal Democrats	Moira Sanders	372	8.79	▼2.67
Liberal Democrats	Martha Zantides	318		
Registered electors		10,155		▼193
Turnout		3,227	31.78	▼8.88
Rejected ballots		3	0.09	▼0.27
Conservative win (new boundaries)				
Conservative win (new boundaries)				
Conservative win (new boundaries)				

=== Tooting ===
Tooting (3)
Party	Candidate	Votes	%	±%
Labour	Nicola Brown	1,534	47.74	▼6.87
Labour	Sadiq Khan*	1,407		
Labour	Stuart King*	1,358		
Conservative	Andrew Lindsay	936	30.39	▲1.56
Conservative	Duncan Dunn	924		
Conservative	Evelyn McDermott^{†} (Note: McDermott was a sitting councillor representing the Nightingale ward)	877		
Liberal Democrats	Maureen Petty	360	10.58	▲1.91
Liberal Democrats	Michael Clifton	354		
Green	Matthew Ledbury	339	11.29	▲3.39
Liberal Democrats	John Roscoe	239		
Registered electors		11,105		▲844
Turnout		2,948	26.55	▼8.07
Rejected ballots		7	0.24	▲0.01
Labour win (new boundaries)				
Labour win (new boundaries)				
Labour win (new boundaries)				

=== Wandsworth Common ===
Wandsworth Common (3)
Party	Candidate	Votes	%	±%
Conservative	Katharine Tracey^{†} (Note: Tracey was a sitting councillor representing the Springfield ward)	2,094	63.93	New
Conservative	Nicholas Longworth^{†} (Note: Longworth was a sitting councillor representing the Southfield ward)	2,090		
Conservative	Ian Hart^{†} (Note: Hart was a sitting councillor representing the Furzedown ward)	2,084		
Labour	Michael Dolan	627	17.47	New
Labour	Belinda Randall	560		
Labour	Mark Panto	526		
Green	Samantha Guy	323	9.88	New
Liberal Democrats	David Hole	312	8.72	New
Liberal Democrats	Emma Thorpe	278		
Liberal Democrats	Jayne Martin-Kay	265		
Registered electors		10,039		New
Turnout		3,164	31.52	New
Rejected ballots		7	0.22	New
Conservative win (new seat)				
Conservative win (new seat)				
Conservative win (new seat)				

=== West Hill ===
West Hill (3)
Party	Candidate	Votes	%	±%
Conservative	Elizabeth Howlett^{†} (Note: Howlett was a sitting councillor representing the Parkside ward)	2,012	57.27	▼3.53
Conservative	Benjamin Holland	1,913		
Conservative	Malcolm Grimston*	1,902		
Labour	Martin Leigh	1,216	33.76	▲4.68
Labour	Donald Roy	1,110		
Labour	Tom Sleigh	1,109		
Liberal Democrats	Catherine Devons	394	8.96	▼1.26
Liberal Democrats	Laurence Spicer	276		
Liberal Democrats	Gerard Walter	242		
Registered electors		10,829		▲4,686
Turnout		3,555	32.83	▼8.89
Rejected ballots		6	0.17	▼0.03
Conservative win (new boundaries)				
Conservative win (new boundaries)				
Conservative win (new seat)				

=== West Putney ===
West Putney (3)
Party	Candidate	Votes	%	±%
Conservative	Martin Hime	2,061	64.93	▲1.74
Conservative	Jane Cooper	2,055		
Conservative	Nadhim Zahawi*	1,961		
Labour	Maureen Booker	779	23.33	▼5.29
Labour	Anthony Stevens	708		
Labour	Robert Storey	696		
Liberal Democrats	Joan Dalley	384	11.74	▲3.55
Liberal Democrats	Susan Shocket	366		
Liberal Democrats	Eleanor Ruddock	349		
Registered electors		10,219		▲476
Turnout		3,215	31.46	▼7.02
Rejected ballots		2	0.06	▼0.15
Conservative win (new boundaries)				
Conservative win (new boundaries)				
Conservative win (new boundaries)				

== Notes ==
Preceded by 1998 Wandsworth Council election	Wandsworth local elections	Succeeded by 2006 Wandsworth Council election
