= Wandsworth London Borough Council elections =

Local UK elections

Wandsworth London Borough Council, England, is elected every four years. From 2002 to 2018, 60 councillors were elected from 20 wards. Following ward boundary changes, in 2022 58 councillors were elected in 22 wards returning either 2 or 3 councillors each.

== Political control ==
The first election to the council was held in 1964, initially operating as a shadow authority before the new system came into full effect in 1965. Political control of the council since 1964 has been held by the following parties:

Election	Overall Control	Conservative	Labour	Lib Dem	Ind.
1964	Labour	13	47	-	-
1968	Conservative	48	12	-	-
1971	Labour	7	54	-	-
1974	Labour	12	48	-	-
1978	Conservative	36	25	-	-
1982	Conservative	33	27	1	-
1986	Conservative	31	30	-	-
1990	Conservative	48	13	-	-
1994	Conservative	45	16	-	-
1998	Conservative	50	11	-	-
2002	Conservative	50	10	-	-
2006	Conservative	51	9	-	-
2010	Conservative	47	13	-	-
2014	Conservative	41	19	-	-
2018	Conservative	33	26	-	1
2022	Labour	22	35	-	1
2026	No overall control	29	28	-	1

== Council elections ==
- 1964 Wandsworth London Borough Council election
- 1968 Wandsworth London Borough Council election (boundary changes took place but the number of seats remained the same)
- 1971 Wandsworth London Borough Council election
- 1974 Wandsworth London Borough Council election
- 1978 Wandsworth London Borough Council election (boundary changes increased the number of seats by one)
- 1982 Wandsworth London Borough Council election
- 1986 Wandsworth London Borough Council election
- 1990 Wandsworth London Borough Council election
- 1994 Wandsworth London Borough Council election (boundary changes took place but the number of seats remained the same) (Note: The Greater London and Surrey (County and London Borough Boundaries) (No. 2) Order 1993) (Note: The Lambeth, Merton and Wandsworth (London Borough Boundaries) Order 1993)
- 1998 Wandsworth London Borough Council election
- 2002 Wandsworth London Borough Council election (boundary changes reduced the number of seats by one)
- 2006 Wandsworth London Borough Council election
- 2010 Wandsworth London Borough Council election
- 2014 Wandsworth London Borough Council election
- 2018 Wandsworth London Borough Council election
- 2022 Wandsworth London Borough Council election (boundary changes reduced the number of seats by two)
- 2026 Wandsworth London Borough Council election

== Borough result maps ==
2002 results map

2006 results map

2010 results map

2014 results map

2018 results map

2022 results map

2026 results map

== By-election results ==
=== 1964-1968 ===
There were no by-elections.

=== 1968-1971 ===
Nightingale by-election, 27 June 1968
Party	Candidate	Votes	%	±%
Conservative	W. Roberts	1,648		
Conservative	N. F. Clark-Lawrence	1,623		
Labour	A. J. Hill	320		
Labour	M. F. Spade	314		
Turnout			17.6%	

Putney by-election, 27 June 1968
Party	Candidate	Votes	%	±%
Conservative	G. W. H. Peters	2,252		
Conservative	G. M. Wolfson	2,243		
Labour	E. M. Jenkins	476		
Labour	F. C. Wells	469		
Turnout			19.2%	

Putney by-election, 29 August 1968
Party	Candidate	Votes	%	±%
Conservative	M. C. M. Warren-Evans	Unopposed		

St John by-election, 6 March 1969
Party	Candidate	Votes	%	±%
Labour	M. F. Sporle	1,085		
Conservative	I. Trapp	797		
National Front	T. Lamb	253		
Liberal	D. G. Patterson	151		
Turnout			24.8%	

=== 1971-1974 ===
Balham by-election, 23 March 1972
Party	Candidate	Votes	%	±%
Labour	S. K. Bovey	1,394		
Conservative	A. E. Cawsey	1,314		
National Front	J. M. Clifton	154		
Communist	A. F. Barr	48		
Union Movement	M. P. Winn	17		
Turnout			29.7%	

Graveney by-election, 23 March 1972
Party	Candidate	Votes	%	±%
Labour	C. A. R. Helm	2,130		
Conservative	M. M. Newman	693		
National Front	T. Lamb	158		
Communist	D. Ellwand	80		
Union Movement	D. R. Gerlach	7		
Turnout			27.6%	

Nightingale by-election, 26 October 1972
Party	Candidate	Votes	%	±%
Conservative	M. A. S. Heaster	1,364		
Labour	D. R. Hill	1,016		
National Front	J. M. Clifton	446		
Turnout			24.6%	

Tooting by-election, 18 April 1973
Party	Candidate	Votes	%	±%
Labour	V. C. Luthers	1,170		
Conservative	E. D. M. Tod	494		
Independent Liberal	E. D. Larkin	99		
Turnout			17.7%	

=== 1974-1978 ===
Southfield by-election, 6 March 1975
Party	Candidate	Votes	%	±%
Conservative	Edward Lister	1,943		
Labour	John Tidball	1,520		
Liberal	John Horrocks	484		
Turnout			37.2	

Graveney by-election, 22 January 1976
Party	Candidate	Votes	%	±%
Labour	Kenneth Solly	1,245		
Conservative	Francis Staff	971		
Liberal	Richard Heron	428		
Independent Labour	Edward Larkin	94		
Communist	Denis Ellward	48		
Turnout			26.6	

Southfield by-election, 10 June 1976
Party	Candidate	Votes	%	±%
Conservative	Roger Merry-Price	2,061		
Labour	Vera Thompson	1,270		
National Front	Diane Dawson	480		
Liberal	Colin Smith	270		
Turnout			38.8	

Furzedown by-election, 4 November 1976
Party	Candidate	Votes	%	±%
Conservative	Brian Prichard	1,716		
Labour	George Rowe	1,260		
National Front	Christopher Lewis	333		
Liberal	Michael Sullivan	240		
Communist	Michael Taylor	54		
Turnout			31.4	

Putney by-election, 9 December 1976
Party	Candidate	Votes	%	±%
Conservative	Margaret Calcott-James	2,658		
Labour	Donald Roy	753		
Liberal	Peter Gerhold	620		
National Front	Diane Dawson	212		
Communist	David Welsh	78		
Turnout			29.2	

=== 1982-1986 ===
Earslfield by-election, 13 October 1983
Party	Candidate	Votes	%	±%
Alliance	David Patterson	1,263		
Labour	Patrick Roche	1,058		
Conservative	Angela Graham	658		
Independent Liberal	Edward Larkin	50		
Ecology (Green)	Elizabeth Shaw	30		

=== 1990-1994 ===
West Putney by-election, 12 December 1991
Party	Candidate	Votes	%	±%
Conservative	Terence Maccabee	1,761	56.3	
Labour	Francis Jones	1,155	36.9	
Liberal Democrats	John Martyn	214	6.8	
Turnout			32.2	
Conservative hold		Swing		

The by-election was called following the death of Cllr Eric Somerville-Jones.

=== 1994-1998 ===
There were no by-elections.

=== 1998-2002 ===
West Putney by-election, 2 July 1998
Party	Candidate	Votes	%	±%
Conservative	Bryan Burn	1,561		
Labour	Paul Baverstock	755		
Liberal Democrats	Susan Shocket	193		
Green	Tracey Thorn	45		
Turnout				
Conservative hold		Swing		

The by-election was called following the death of Cllr William Hawkins.

Balham by-election, 1 July 1999
Party	Candidate	Votes	%	±%
Conservative	Richard Longmore	1,136		
Labour	Martin Tupper	596		
Liberal Democrats	Matthew Green	125		
Green	John Rattray	109		
Independent	Edward Larkin	10		
Turnout				
Conservative hold		Swing		

The by-election was called following the resignation of Cllr Andrew White.

=== 2002-2006 ===
There were no by-elections.

=== 2006-2010 ===
There were no by-elections.

=== 2010-2014 ===
Thamesfield by-election, 30 June 2011
Party	Candidate	Votes	%	±%
Conservative	Michael Ryder	1,497		
Labour	Christian Klapp	1022		
Liberal Democrats	Lisa Smart	545		
Green	Marian Hoffman	202		
Turnout				
Conservative hold		Swing		

The by-election was called following the resignation of Cllr Edward Lister.

Southfields by-election, 29 March 2012
Party	Candidate	Votes	%	±%
Conservative	Kim Caddy	1,841		
Labour	Josh Kaile	1511		
Liberal Democrats	John Munro	220		
Green	Bruce Mackenzie	100		
UKIP	Strachan McDonald	40		
Independent	Mohammed Abid	38		
Turnout				
Conservative hold		Swing		

The by-election was called following the resignation of Cllr Lucy Allan.

=== 2014-2018 ===
Earlsfield by-election 7 May 2015
Party	Candidate	Votes	%	±%
Conservative	Angela Graham	4,418		
Labour	Paul White	2,879		
Green	Liam Morgan	514		
Liberal Democrats	Oliver Bailey	387		
UKIP	Thomas Blackwell	374		
Majority				
Turnout				
Conservative hold		Swing		

The by-election was triggered by the death of Cllr Adrian Knowles of the Conservative Party. The by-election was held on the same day as the 2015 general election.

Tooting by-election 18 August 2016
Party	Candidate	Votes	%	±%
Labour	Paul White	1,467		
Conservative	Thom Norman	944		
Liberal Democrats	Eileen Arms	267		
Green	Albert Vickery	116		
SDP	Alexander Balkan	75		
Majority				
Turnout				
Labour hold		Swing		

The by-election was triggered by the resignation of Cllr Ben Johnson of the Labour Party, following his appointment as an adviser to the Mayor of London, Sadiq Khan.

Queenstown by-election 10th November 2016
Party	Candidate	Votes	%	±%
Labour	Aydin Dikerdem	1,551		
Conservative	Rhodri Morgan	987		
Liberal Democrats	Richard Adam-Davis	249		
Green	Stella Baker	122		

This by-election was triggered by the death of Councillor Sally-Ann Ephson of the Labour Party.

=== 2018–2022 ===
Furzedown by-election 21 June 2019
Party	Candidate	Votes	%	±%
Labour	Graham Loveland	1,811	49.0	▼14.7
Liberal Democrats	Jon Irwin	887	24.0	▲18.7
Conservative	Nabi Toktas	681	18.4	▼3.0
Green	Gerard Harrison	318	8.6	▼1.0
Majority		924	25.0	
Turnout				
Labour hold		Swing		

Bedford by-election 6 May 2021
Party	Candidate	Votes	%	±%
Labour	Hannah Stanislaus	2,714	48.3	
Conservative	Tom Mytton	1,778	31.7	
Green	David Carlyon	815	14.5	
Liberal Democrats	Reeten Banerji	318	5.5	
Majority				
Turnout			51.4	
Labour hold		Swing		

Bedford by-election 25 November 2021
Party	Candidate	Votes	%	±%
Labour	Sheila Boswell	906	40.2	▼9.8
Conservative	Tom Mytton	905	40.2	▲5.7
Green	Roy Vickery	306	13.6	▲4.3
Liberal Democrats	Paul Tibbles	135	6.0	▼0.2
Majority		1	0.0	
Turnout		2252	21.7	
Labour hold		Swing		

The by-election was triggered by the resignation of Cllr Hannah Stanislaus of the Labour Party

=== 2022-2026 ===
Tooting Broadway by-election 14 July 2022
Party	Candidate	Votes	%	±%
Labour	Rex Osborn	1,429	62.2	▲1.6
Conservative	Jonathan Iliff	491	21.4	▲2.8
Green	Lisa Osborne	285	12.4	▼2.5
Liberal Democrats	Haren Thillainathan	94	4.1	▼2.0
Majority		938	40.8	
Turnout		2,299	19.3	
Labour hold		Swing		

The by-election was triggered by the death of Cllr Andy Gibbons of the Labour Party.

Tooting Broadway by-election 18 January 2024
Party	Candidate	Votes	%	±%
Labour	Sean Lawless	1,888	67.3	▲6.8
Conservative	Otto Jacobsson	542	19.3	▲0.8
Green	Nick Humberstone	261	9.3	▼5.5
Liberal Democrats	Thillainathan Haren	113	4.0	▼2.0
Majority		1,346	48.0	
Turnout		2,804	24.10	
Labour hold		Swing		

The by-election was triggered by the resignation of Cllr Kate Forbes of the Labour Party.

West Putney by-election 2 May 2024
Party	Candidate	Votes	%	±%
Conservative	Nick Austin	2,839	45.3	▲4.7
Labour	Jane Briginshaw	2,350	37.5	▼5.3
Liberal Democrats	Mark Lejman	635	10.1	▲1.9
Green	Fergal McEntee	438	7.0	▼1.4
Majority		489	7.8	
Turnout		6,262		
Conservative gain from Labour		Swing		

The by-election was triggered by the resignation of Cllr Claire Gilbert of the Labour Party.

=== 2022-2026 ===
Trinity by-election 27 August 2026
Party	Candidate	Votes	%	±%
Labour	Shirin Georgiani	1,558	47.5	▲8.8
Conservative	Otto Jacobsson	1,431	43.6	▲9.0
Green	Sylvain Magne	168	5.1	▼10.8
Liberal Democrats	Dylan Henderson	75	2.3	▼2.9
Reform	Josh Stanton	51	1.6	▼2.6
Majority		127	3.9	
Turnout		3,283		
Labour hold		Swing		

The by-election was triggered by the resignation of Cllr Lizzy Dobres of the Labour Party.
