= 1990 Wandsworth London Borough Council election =

Local election in England

- 3 May 1990

61 seats for election to Wandsworth London Borough Council 31 seats needed for a majority
- Registered: 193,197
- Turnout: 109,141, 56.49%
	First party	Second party
Leader	Paul Beresford	Tony Belton
Party	Conservative	Labour
Leader since	1983	Jan 1978
Leader's seat	Thamesfield	Latchmere
Seats won	48	13
Seat change	▲17	▼17
Popular vote	155,248	113,255
Percentage	54.37%	39.67%
Council control before election
Conservative
Council control after election
Conservative

The 1990 Wandsworth Council election took place on 3 May 1990 to elect members of Wandsworth London Borough Council in London, England. The whole council was up for election and the Conservative Party stayed in overall control of the council.

== Election result ==
1990 Wandwsorth London Borough Council election
Party	Seats	Gains	Losses	Net gain/loss	Seats %	Votes %	Votes	+/−
Conservative	48	17	0	▲17	78.7	54.36	155,248	
Labour	13	0	17	▼17	21.3	39.69	113,356	
Green	0	0	0	Steady	0.0	2.93	8,377	
Liberal Democrats	0	0	0	Steady	0.0	2.86	8,182	
Independent	0	0	0	Steady	0.0	0.16	453	
Total	61						285,616	

== Ward results ==
(*) - Indicates an incumbent candidate

=== Balham ===
Balham (3)
Party	Candidate	Votes	%
Conservative	Jeanette J. Gaffney*	2,764	54.07
Conservative	William J. Donald-Adkin	2,759	
Conservative	Nicholas F.H.W. Lyde	2,632	
Labour	Christopher P. Lowe	1,879	35.71
Labour	Sarah J. Newens	1,846	
Labour	Pamela J. Woodroffe	1,660	
Green	Ian Wingrove	514	10.22
Registered electors		9,061	
Turnout		5,009	55.28
Rejected ballots		7	0.14
Conservative hold			
Conservative hold			
Conservative hold			

=== Bedford ===
Bedford (3)
Party	Candidate	Votes	%
Conservative	Jean M. Lucas	2,519	45.03
Conservative	Colin F. Dawe	2,489	
Conservative	John M. Rattray	2,459	
Labour	Lesley J. Alexander	2,160	38.03
Labour	Arnold J. Cohen*	2,111	
Labour	Neville Daniels*	2,036	
Green	Nicholas P. George	464	8.39
Independent	Edward D. Larkin	239	4.32
Liberal Democrats	Matthew Bryant	234	4.23
Registered electors		9,473	
Turnout		5,234	55.25
Rejected ballots		12	0.23
Conservative gain from Labour			
Conservative gain from Labour			
Conservative gain from Labour			

=== Earlsfield ===
Earlsfield (2)
Party	Candidate	Votes	%
Conservative	Angela Graham*	2,038	50.55
Conservative	John F. Grimshaw	1,922	
Labour	Belinda J. Randall	1,625	39.98
Labour	High I.K. Thomson	1,507	
Green	Suzy Barry	224	5.72
Liberal Democrats	Philip J. Minshull	147	3.75
Registered electors		6,561	
Turnout		3,946	60.14
Rejected ballots		4	0.10
Conservative gain from Labour			
Conservative hold			

=== East Putney ===
East Putney (3)
Party	Candidate	Votes	%
Conservative	Margaret E. Calcott-James*	3,382	62.70
Conservative	Brian N.C. Prichard	3,239	
Conservative	Diana Whittingham*	3,213	
Labour	Michael Freedman	1,399	25.94
Labour	Hannah S. Jones	1,386	
Labour	David Suiter	1,284	
Liberal Democrats	Matthew G. Green	332	5.53
Green	Nicholas E. Orosz	305	5.83
Liberal Democrats	John D. Martyn	280	
Liberal Democrats	Godfrey S. Shocket	254	
Registered electors		9,863	
Turnout		5,304	53.78
Rejected ballots		5	0.09
Conservative hold			
Conservative hold			
Conservative hold			

=== Fairfield ===
Fairfield (2)
Party	Candidate	Votes	%
Conservative	Vanessa Graham	1,952	52.49
Conservative	Sarah T.J. du Cann	1,870	
Labour	John H. Miller*	1,579	41.14
Labour	John P. O'Farrell	1,416	
Green	Sandra J. Hewett	232	6.37
Registered electors		5,743	
Turnout		3,718	64.74
Rejected ballots		6	0.16
Conservative gain from Labour			
Conservative gain from Labour			

=== Furzedown ===
Furzedown (3)
Party	Candidate	Votes	%
Conservative	Alfred C. Jessiman*	2,947	47.38
Conservative	Anne M. Mervis	2,939	
Conservative	Margrit A. Wood	2,854	
Labour	John W. Gibbins*	2,686	42.91
Labour	Isobel Larkin	2,629	
Labour	Bernard J. Corbett	2,598	
Green	Donald J. Valentine	325	5.24
Green	Monica E. Vickery	318	
Liberal Democrats	Lalage L.A. Clay	275	4.47
Registered electors		10,750	
Turnout		6,219	57.85
Rejected ballots		4	0.06
Conservative hold			
Conservative gain from Labour			
Conservative hold			

=== Graveney ===
Graveney (3)
Party	Candidate	Votes	%
Labour	Duncan E. Braithwaite*	1,974	39.86
Labour	Vendis A. King	1,781	
Labour	Thakur D. Hosain	1,756	
Liberal Democrats	Robert J. Bunce	1,287	26.25
Conservative	Marc Hope	1,280	26.58
Liberal Democrats	Mark A. Green	1,238	
Conservative	Anne K. Ratcliffe	1,222	
Conservative	Sarah A. Whitcouse	1,172	
Liberal Democrats	Roger O'Brien	1,104	
Green	Bruce J. Bartup	337	7.31
Registered electors		10,012	
Turnout		4,734	47.28
Rejected ballots		8	0.17
Labour hold			
Labour hold			
Labour hold			

=== Latchmere ===
Latchmere (3)
Party	Candidate	Votes	%
Labour	Anthony J. Belton*	2,226	52.21
Labour	Maurice Johnson	2,108	
Labour	Anthony E. Tuck	1,952	
Conservative	Timothy P. Loughton	1,652	40.79
Conservative	Alan P. Caddick-Adams	1,641	
Conservative	Bernadina I.T. Ayonrinde	1,619	
Green	Marianne Kolbuszewski	281	7.00
Registered electors		8,112	
Turnout		4,333	53.41
Rejected ballots		3	0.07
Labour hold			
Labour hold			
Labour hold			

=== Nightingale ===
Nightingale (3)
Party	Candidate	Votes	%
Conservative	Peter D. Donoghue*	2,922	52.72
Conservative	Maurice A.S. Heaster*	2,837	
Conservative	Ravindra P. Govindia*	2,736	
Labour	Lionel G. Davis	1,723	29.71
Labour	Nigel R. Webb	1,544	
Labour	Ian Rodriguez	1,521	
Green	Andrew M. Simms	594	11.06
Liberal Democrats	Benson Julie	350	6.51
Registered electors		9,223	
Turnout		5,176	56.12
Rejected ballots		4	0.08
Conservative hold			
Conservative hold			
Conservative hold			

=== Northcote ===
Northcote (3)
Party	Candidate	Votes	%
Conservative	Martin D. Johnson*	3,235	63.37
Conservative	Andrew G. Grant*	3,174	
Conservative	Gordon S. Passmore*	3,131	
Labour	Thomas L. Noble	1,309	25.59
Labour	Audrey M. Schmitt	1,296	
Labour	Gulzar A. Butt	1,248	
Green	Matthew D. McCabe	554	11.04
Registered electors		8,749	
Turnout		5,036	57.56
Rejected ballots		3	0.06
Conservative hold			
Conservative hold			
Conservative hold			

=== Parkside ===
Parkside (2)
Party	Candidate	Votes	%
Conservative	Angela Graham	2,038	53.14
Conservative	John F. Grimshaw	1,922	
Labour	Thomas L. Noble	1,410	36.53
Labour	Kathryn H. Pick	1,311	
Green	Julian T. de Angeli	194	5.21
Liberal Democrats	Rosemary S. Henley	191	5.12
Registered electors		5,942	
Turnout		3,763	63.33
Rejected ballots		7	0.19
Conservative hold			
Conservative hold			

=== Queenstown ===
Queenstown (2)
Party	Candidate	Votes	%
Conservative	Rosamund E. Blofield-Smith	1,806	52.46
Conservative	Nicholas J. Fernyhough	1,685	
Labour	Philip Green*	1,398	40.66
Labour	John P. O'Sullivan	1,308	
Green	Helene Y. Lyons	229	6.88
Registered electors		6,414	
Turnout		3,423	53.37
Rejected ballots		4	0.12
Conservative gain from Labour			
Conservative gain from Labour			

=== Roehampton ===
Roehampton (3)
Party	Candidate	Votes	%
Labour	John A. Slater*	2,653	50.60
Labour	Vera Thompson*	2,575	
Labour	Frederick M.T. Ponsonby	2,545	
Conservative	Jennifer M. Dibble	2,157	41.14
Conservative	Martin Hime	2,131	
Conservative	Ronald G.R. Holben	2,032	
Liberal Democrats	Ruth E. Taylor	423	8.26
Registered electors		9,480	
Turnout		5,386	56.81
Rejected ballots		65	1.21
Labour hold			
Labour hold			
Labour hold			

=== St John ===
St John (3)
Party	Candidate	Votes	%
Conservative	Clive Dixon	2,056	45.67
Labour	Derek R. Sutton	1,937	42.82
Conservative	Paul V. Green	1,912	
Conservative	Simon J. Mallett	1,892	
Labour	Alen J. Mathewson	1,876	
Labour	Martin C. Tupper*	1,682	
Green	Geoffrey R. Cox	492	11.51
Registered electors		9,165	
Turnout		4,425	48.28
Rejected ballots		7	0.16
Conservative gain from Labour			
Labour hold			
Conservative gain from Labour			

=== St. Mary's Park ===
St Mary's Park (3)
Party	Candidate	Votes	%
Conservative	Roger M. Frank	2,844	58.97
Conservative	Philip D. Bastiman	2,803	
Conservative	Christopher J. Reilly	2,770	
Labour	Priscilla Cornwell-Jones*	2,106	41.03
Labour	Stuart H.J. Hercock*	1,896	
Labour	William R. Johnston*	1,854	
Registered electors		8,891	
Turnout		5,080	57.14
Rejected ballots		12	0.24
Conservative gain from Labour			
Conservative gain from Labour			
Conservative gain from Labour			

=== Shaftesbury ===
Shaftesbury (3)
Party	Candidate	Votes	%
Conservative	Peter M. Ainsworth	3,089	53.15
Conservative	Christopher F. Sadler	2,926	
Conservative	John G.B. Senior	2,848	
Labour	Fiona M. Mactaggart*	2,166	38.03
Labour	Francis H. Jones*	2,139	
Labour	Charles V.G. Henry	2,038	
Green	Susan C. Corcoran	490	8.82
Registered electors		9,682	
Turnout		5,650	58.36
Rejected ballots		6	0.11
Conservative gain from Labour			
Conservative gain from Labour			
Conservative gain from Labour			

=== Southfield ===
Southfield (3)
Party	Candidate	Votes	%
Conservative	Jennifer S. Nickels	3,363	51.36
Conservative	Christine A.K. Thompson*	3,332	
Conservative	Mark J.M. Simmonds	3,294	
Labour	John R. Gibbs	2,228	34.15
Labour	Jacqueline Pearce	2,219	
Labour	Anne M. Goulborn	2,196	
Green	Marilyn A. Elson	555	8.56
Liberal Democrats	Jeremy N. Ambache	385	5.94
Registered electors		10,113	
Turnout		6,287	62.17
Rejected ballots		4	0.06
Conservative hold			
Conservative hold			
Conservative hold			

=== Springfield ===
Springfield (3)
Party	Candidate	Votes	%
Conservative	Katharine R. Tracey*	3,329	56.58
Conservative	John R. Garrett*	3,233	
Conservative	James C.M.L. Crawford*	3,212	
Labour	Dorothy E. Ballantine	1,907	31.80
Labour	Michael W. Gilbert	1,835	
Labour	Leonard C. Canter	1,750	
Green	Albert R. Vickery	389	6.76
Liberal Democrats	Piers R. Allen	280	4.86
Registered electors		9,982	
Turnout		5,750	57.60
Rejected ballots		5	0.09
Conservative hold			
Conservative hold			
Conservative hold			

=== Thamesfield ===
Thamesfield (3)
Party	Candidate	Votes	%
Conservative	Alexander P. Beresford*	3,530	58.14
Conservative	Lois M. Lees	3,339	
Conservative	Edward J.U. Lister*	3,250	
Labour	Vanessa B. Cooper	1,587	25.42
Labour	Maureen D. Walsh	1,422	
Labour	Frank W. McKirgan	1,417	
Green	Andrew R. Cunliffe-Jones	435	7.20
Green	John L.F. Daglish	401	
Liberal Democrats	Nicholas W.M. Leggett	351	5.55
Liberal Democrats	Patrick J. Wallace	292	
Independent	Peter A. Kearney	214	3.69
Registered electors		9,936	
Turnout		5,773	58.10
Rejected ballots		3	0.05
Conservative hold			
Conservative hold			
Conservative hold			

=== Tooting ===
Tooting (3)
Party	Candidate	Votes	%
Labour	Elaine Axby	2,638	49.29
Labour	Shona McIsaac	2,522	
Labour	Bernard J. Rosewell*	2,510	
Conservative	Malcolm C. Grimston	1,972	36.45
Conservative	Andrew R. Price	1,956	
Conservative	Richard A.H. Vivian	1,744	
Green	Gordon Reid	467	9.00
Liberal Democrats	George I. Berger	273	5.26
Registered electors		10,073	
Turnout		5,235	51.97
Rejected ballots		10	0.19
Labour hold			
Labour hold			
Labour hold			

=== Westhill ===
West Hill (2)
Party	Candidate	Votes	%
Conservative	Beryl Jeffery	2,134	53.98
Conservative	Russell J. Yardley	2,032	
Labour	Margaret J. Cumming	1,463	36.07
Labour	Donald J. Roy	1,321	
Green	Lionel R.P. Smith	208	5.39
Liberal Democrats	Jane M. Headland	176	4.56
Registered electors		6,306	
Turnout		3,884	61.59
Rejected ballots		10	0.26
Conservative hold			
Conservative hold			

=== West Putney ===
West Putney (3)
Party	Candidate	Votes	%
Conservative	William F.D. Hawkins*	3,400	58.03
Conservative	Mary M. Holben*	3,388	
Conservative	Eric K. Somerville-Jones*	3,230	
Labour	Maureen D. Booker	1,845	30.17
Labour	Valerie Williams	1,712	
Labour	Phyllis E.J. Tobias	1,651	
Green	Simon J. Desorgher	369	6.41
Liberal Democrats	Neil J.M. Thomson	310	5.39
Registered electors		9,666	
Turnout		5,776	59.76
Rejected ballots		6	0.10
Conservative hold			
Conservative hold			
Conservative hold			
