= 1994 Wandsworth London Borough Council election =

1994 local election in England

- 5 May 1994

All 61 seats up for election to Wandsworth London Borough Council 31 seats needed for a majority
- Registered: 195,183
- Turnout: 97,587, 50.00%
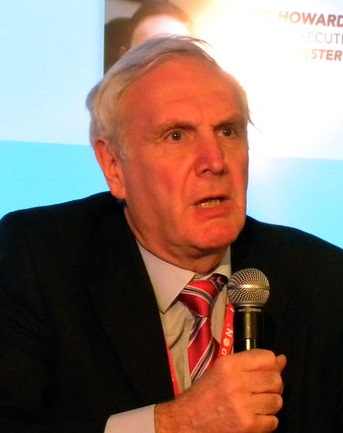

	First party	Second party	Third party
Leader	Edward Lister	Unknown	Unknown
Party	Conservative	Labour	Liberal Democrats
Leader since	1992	Unknown	Unknown
Leader's seat	Thamesfield	Unknown	Unknown
Last election	48 seats, 54.36%	13 seats, 39.69%	0 seats, 2.86%
Seats before	48	13	0
Seats won	45	16	0
Seat change	▼3	▲3	Steady
Popular vote	130,477	103,857	23,768
Percentage	50.03%	39.82%	9.11%
Swing	▼4.33	▲0.13	▲6.25
Council control before election
Conservative
Council control after election
Conservative

The 1994 Wandsworth Council election took place on 5 May 1994 to elect members of Wandsworth London Borough Council in London, England. The whole council was up for election and the Conservative Party stayed in overall control of the council.

== Election result ==
1994 Wandsworth London Borough Council Election
Party	Seats	Gains	Losses	Net gain/loss	Seats %	Votes %	Votes	+/−
Conservative	45	0	3	▼3	73.77	50.03	130,477	▼4.33
Labour	16	3	0	▲3	26.23	39.82	103,857	▲0.13
Liberal Democrats	0	0	0	Steady	0.00	9.11	23,768	▲6.25
Green	0	0	0	Steady	0.00	0.87	2,269	▼2.06
Independent	0	0	0	Steady	0.00	0.13	326	▼0.03
Ind. Lib Dem	0	0	0	Steady	0.00	0.04	91	New
Total	61						260,788	

== Ward results ==
(*) - Indicates an incumbent candidate

(†) - Indicates an incumbent candidate standing in a different ward

=== Balham ===
Balham (3)
Party	Candidate	Votes	%	±%
Conservative	William Donald-Adkin*	2,462	53.95	▼0.12
Conservative	Bernadina Ayonrinde	2,393		
Conservative	Charles McFall	2,384		
Labour	Sarah Newens	1,730	38.07	▲2.36
Labour	Thakur Hosain	1,719		
Labour	Martin Tupper	1,659		
Liberal Democrats	Matthew Adam-Smith	377	7.98	New
Liberal Democrats	Julie Benson	374		
Liberal Democrats	David Cooke-Yarborough	321		
Registered electors		9,039		▼22
Turnout		4,618	51.09	▼4.19
Rejected ballots		8	0.17	▲0.03
Conservative hold				
Conservative hold				
Conservative hold				

=== Bedford ===
Bedford (3)
Party	Candidate	Votes	%	±%
Conservative	Colin Dawe*	2,132	44.74	▼0.29
Conservative	Jean Lucas*	2,123		
Conservative	Peter Kennerley	2,109		
Labour	Sven Bunn	1,945	40.37	▲2.34
Labour	David Southey	1,904		
Labour	Pamela Tatlow	1,892		
Liberal Democrats	Catherine Brown	331	6.16	▲1.93
Green	Lewis Betts	302	6.37	▼2.02
Liberal Democrats	Arminel Fennelly	278		
Liberal Democrats	Christopher Reilly	266		
Independent	Br Michael Bartlett	112	2.36	▼1.96
Registered electors		9,642		▲169
Turnout		4,719	48.94	▼6.31
Rejected ballots		7	0.15	▼0.08
Conservative hold				
Conservative hold				
Conservative hold				

=== Earlsfield ===
Earlsfield (2)
Party	Candidate	Votes	%	±%
Conservative	Angela Graham*	1,787	51.58	▲1.03
Conservative	John Grimshaw*	1,699		
Labour	Winston Gordon	1,419	40.52	▲0.54
Labour	Deidre Parkinson	1,319		
Liberal Democrats	Alan Giles	186	5.21	▲1.46
Liberal Democrats	Neil Thomson	166		
Ind. Lib Dem	Edward Larkin	91	2.69	New
Registered electors		6,591		▲30
Turnout		3,503	53.15	▼6.99
Rejected ballots		11	0.31	▲0.21
Conservative hold				
Conservative hold				

=== East Putney ===
East Putney (3)
Party	Candidate	Votes	%	±%
Conservative	Margaret Calcott-James*	2,628	58.78	▼3.92
Conservative	Diana Whittingham*	2,511		
Conservative	Brian Prichard*	2,501		
Labour	Finna Ayres	1,418	31.34	▲5.40
Labour	Robert Knowles	1,344		
Labour	Alan Petrides	1,313		
Liberal Democrats	Anthony Burrett	469	9.88	▲4.35
Liberal Democrats	Stephen Palmer	441		
Liberal Democrats	Nicholas Kounoupias	375		
Registered electors		10,039		▲176
Turnout		4,543	45.25	▼8.53
Rejected ballots		4	0.09	Steady
Conservative hold				
Conservative hold				
Conservative hold				

=== Fairfield ===
Fairfield (2)
Party	Candidate	Votes	%	±%
Conservative	Vanessa Graham*	1,882	54.54	▲2.05
Conservative	Thomas Morony	1,806		
Labour	Charles Henry	1,352	39.78	▼1.36
Labour	Ann Light	1,338		
Liberal Democrats	Patrick Warren	205	5.68	New
Liberal Democrats	Paul Nagle	178		
Registered electors		5,978		▲235
Turnout		3,491	58.40	▼6.34
Rejected ballots		3	0.09	▼0.07
Conservative hold				
Conservative hold				

=== Furzedown ===
Furzedown (3)
Party	Candidate	Votes	%	±%
Conservative	Ian Hart	2,507	46.19	▼1.19
Labour	John Gallagher	2,484	44.42	▲1.51
Conservative	Evelyn McDermott	2,401		
Conservative	Sheldon Wilkie	2,324		
Labour	Jonathan Nicholson	2,278		
Labour	Esther Persaud	2,195		
Liberal Democrats	Michael Frost	326	5.71	▲1.24
Liberal Democrats	Richard Henderson	323		
Liberal Democrats	Richard Williams	246		
Green	Monica Vickery	212	3.68	▼1.56
Green	Donald Valentine	171		
Registered electors		10,660		▼90
Turnout		5,495	51.55	▼6.30
Rejected ballots		4	0.07	▲0.01
Conservative hold				
Labour gain from Conservative				
Conservative hold				

=== Graveney ===
Graveney (3)
Party	Candidate	Votes	%	±%
Labour	Duncan Braithwaite*	2,318	48.21	▲8.35
Labour	Andrew Gibbons	2,263		
Labour	Catherine Prichard	2,184		
Liberal Democrats	Mark Green	1,438	27.82	▲1.57
Liberal Democrats	Roger O'Brien	1,296		
Liberal Democrats	Christine Whittingham	1,170		
Conservative	Marc Hope	952	19.18	▼7.40
Conservative	David Turtle	869		
Conservative	Clare Ward	869		
Green	Albert Vickery	224	4.79	▼2.52
Registered electors		10,105		▲93
Turnout		4,878	48.27	▲0.99
Rejected ballots		7	0.14	▼0.03
Labour hold				
Labour hold				
Labour hold				

=== Latchmere ===
Latchmere (3)
Party	Candidate	Votes	%	±%
Labour	Anthony Belton*	1,835	52.05	▼0.16
Labour	Maurice Johnson*	1,756		
Labour	Samantha Heath	1,748		
Conservative	Nicholas Archer	1,505	41.84	▲1.05
Conservative	Richard Bassett	1,467		
Conservative	Christopher Heaton-Harris	1,320		
Liberal Democrats	Julian Brazil	219	6.11	New
Liberal Democrats	Michael Davenport	209		
Liberal Democrats	George Watson	198		
Registered electors		8,270		▲158
Turnout		3,784	45.76	▼7.65
Rejected ballots		6	0.16	▲0.09
Labour hold				
Labour hold				
Labour hold				

=== Nightingale ===
Nightingale (3)
Party	Candidate	Votes	%	±%
Conservative	Maurice Heaster*	2,324	53.70	▲0.98
Conservative	Martin Winter	2,286		
Conservative	Ravindra Govindia*	2,284		
Labour	Nicola Brown	1,627	36.88	▲7.17
Labour	Ryan Haines	1,577		
Labour	Gordon Paterson	1,531		
Liberal Democrats	Anthony Fennelly	419	9.42	▲2.91
Liberal Democrats	Ivor Strong	403		
Liberal Democrats	Alex Watling	386		
Registered electors		9,411		▲188
Turnout		4,536	48.20	▼7.92
Rejected ballots		6	0.13	▲0.05
Conservative hold				
Conservative hold				
Conservative hold				

=== Northcote ===
Northcote (3)
Party	Candidate	Votes	%	±%
Conservative	Martin Johnson*	2,679	56.65	▼6.72
Conservative	Clive Dixon^{†} (Note: Dixon was a sitting councillor representing the St John ward)	2,651		
Conservative	Gordon Passmore*	2,622		
Labour	Tamara Flanagan	1,239	25.83	▲0.24
Labour	Colum Smith	1,237		
Labour	Tracey Van-Tongeren	1,151		
Green	Peter Budge	449	9.59	▼1.45
Liberal Democrats	Charles Cronin	393	7.93	New
Liberal Democrats	David Bouchier	375		
Liberal Democrats	Anthony Bouchier	345		
Registered electors		8,980		▲231
Turnout		4,497	50.08	▼7.48
Rejected ballots		3	0.07	▲0.01
Conservative hold				
Conservative hold				
Conservative hold				

=== Parkside ===
Parkside (2)
Party	Candidate	Votes	%	±%
Conservative	Elizabeth Howlett	1,782	54.96	▲1.82
Conservative	Josephine Sedgwick	1,698		
Labour	Karen Chapman	1,163	35.66	▼0.87
Labour	Donald Roy	1,094		
Liberal Democrats	Catherine Devons	319	9.38	▲4.26
Liberal Democrats	Simon Campbell-Jones	275		
Registered electors		5,904		▼38
Turnout		3,316	56.17	▼7.16
Rejected ballots		7	0.21	▲0.02
Conservative hold				
Conservative hold				

=== Queenstown ===
Queenstown (2)
Party	Candidate	Votes	%	±%
Conservative	Carol Humphries	1,722	54.15	▲1.69
Conservative	Richard Vivian	1,615		
Labour	Philip Inglesant	1,243	40.24	▼0.42
Labour	June Tipping	1,236		
Liberal Democrats	Paul Ekins	178	5.61	New
Liberal Democrats	Julian Thomas	167		
Registered electors		6,916		▲502
Turnout		3,234	46.76	▼6.61
Rejected ballots		4	0.12	Steady
Conservative hold				
Conservative hold				

=== Roehampton ===
Roehampton (3)
Party	Candidate	Votes	%	±%
Labour	John Slater*	2,149	50.64	▲0.04
Labour	Vera Thompson*	2,148		
Labour	Pauline Brueseke	2,147		
Conservative	Katherine van den Elst	1,624	38.19	▼2.95
Conservative	Stephen Lorch	1,622		
Conservative	Russell Yardley	1,614		
Liberal Democrats	Nicholas Leggett	514	11.17	▲2.91
Liberal Democrats	John Martyn	466		
Liberal Democrats	Godfrey Shocket	441		
Registered electors		8,929		▼551
Turnout		4,559	51.06	▼5.75
Rejected ballots		11	0.24	▼0.97
Labour hold				
Labour hold				
Labour hold				

=== St John ===
St John (3)
Party	Candidate	Votes	%	±%
Labour	Aiden Grimes	2,020	48.88	▲6.06
Labour	Derek Sutton*	1,934		
Labour	Anthony Tuck	1,892		
Conservative	Zoe Day	1,805	43.54	▼2.13
Conservative	Neil Wallace	1,720		
Conservative	Mark Kotecha	1,683		
Liberal Democrats	Andrew Crick	327	7.58	New
Liberal Democrats	Lilu Stewart	295		
Liberal Democrats	Richard Goalen	285		
Registered electors		9,332		▲167
Turnout		4,221	45.23	▼3.05
Rejected ballots		4	0.09	▼0.07
Labour gain from Conservative				
Labour hold				
Labour gain from Conservative				

=== St Mary's Park ===
St Mary's Park (3)
Party	Candidate	Votes	%	±%
Conservative	Philip Bastiman*	2,416	51.87	▼7.10
Conservative	Adrian Flook	2,355		
Conservative	Christopher Reilly*	2,290		
Labour	Patrick Eraut	1,687	36.25	▼4.78
Labour	William Johnston	1,641		
Labour	Toby Naish	1,606		
Liberal Democrats	David Owen-Jones	319	6.35	New
Liberal Democrats	Christopher Woodley	276		
Liberal Democrats	David Patterson	270		
Green	Caroline Austin	251	5.53	New
Registered electors		9,052		▲161
Turnout		4,557	50.34	▼6.80
Rejected ballots		5	0.11	▼0.13
Conservative hold				
Conservative hold				
Conservative hold				

=== Shaftesbury ===
Shaftesbury (3)
Party	Candidate	Votes	%	±%
Conservative	Alistair Crellin	2,658	56.74	▲3.59
Conservative	Christopher Sadler*	2,644		
Conservative	John Senior*	2,615		
Labour	Christine Eccles	1,760	34.51	▼3.52
Labour	Gillian Pettitt	1,564		
Labour	Richard Thomas	1,490		
Liberal Democrats	Andrew Brabin	433	8.75	New
Liberal Democrats	James Sparling	417		
Liberal Democrats	Tariq Sadiq	371		
Registered electors		9,927		▲245
Turnout		4,868	49.04	▼9.32
Rejected ballots		8	0.16	▲0.05
Conservative hold				
Conservative hold				
Conservative hold				

=== Southfield ===
Southfield (3)
Party	Candidate	Votes	%	±%
Conservative	Christine Thompson*	2,974	49.21	▼2.15
Conservative	Dominic Rossi	2,830		
Conservative	Paul Green^{†} (Note: Green was a sitting councillor representing the St John ward)	2,713		
Labour	Simon Parkinson	2,031	33.58	▼0.57
Labour	Paul Peters	1,899		
Labour	Gavin Reddin	1,880		
Liberal Democrats	Matthew Green	471	7.49	▲1.55
Liberal Democrats	Ed Davey	438		
Liberal Democrats	Casper Wrede	386		
Green	Marilyn Elson	347	6.01	▼2.55
Independent	Pamela Davies	214	3.71	New
Registered electors		10,035		▼78
Turnout		5,656	56.36	▼5.81
Rejected ballots		14	0.25	▲0.19
Conservative hold				
Conservative hold				
Conservative hold				

=== Springfield ===
Springfield (3)
Party	Candidate	Votes	%	±%
Conservative	Katharine Tracey*	2,744	52.00	▼4.58
Conservative	John Garrett*	2,733		
Conservative	Anne Mervis^{†} (Note: Mervis was a sitting councillor representing the Furzedown ward)	2,723		
Labour	Colin Pavelin	1,863	34.97	▲3.17
Labour	Jeanne Smith	1,861		
Labour	Paul White	1,790		
Liberal Democrats	Julian Barratt	440	7.08	▲2.22
Liberal Democrats	James Gurling	379		
Green	Steven Gardiner	313	5.95	▼0.81
Liberal Democrats	Christopher Salaman	296		
Registered electors		10,488		▲506
Turnout		5,336	50.88	▼6.72
Rejected ballots		8	0.15	▲0.06
Conservative hold				
Conservative hold				
Conservative hold				

=== Thamesfield ===
Thamesfield (3)
Party	Candidate	Votes	%	±%
Conservative	Edward Lister*	2,902	59.19	▲1.05
Conservative	Lois Lees*	2,901		
Conservative	Nadhim Zahawi	2,611		
Labour	Christopher Locke	1,372	28.78	▲3.36
Labour	Margaret Yearsley	1,360		
Labour	Richard Thomas	1,359		
Liberal Democrats	Robert Cross	643	12.03	▲6.48
Liberal Democrats	John Richling	545		
Liberal Democrats	Patrick Wallace	521		
Registered electors		10,063		▲127
Turnout		4,982	49.51	▼8.59
Rejected ballots		6	0.12	▲0.07
Conservative hold				
Conservative hold				
Conservative hold				

=== Tooting ===
Tooting (3)
Party	Candidate	Votes	%	±%
Labour	Shona McIsaac*	2,513	58.60	▲9.31
Labour	Bernard Rosewell*	2,509		
Labour	Sadiq Khan	2,437		
Conservative	Guy Hill	1,433	32.82	▼3.63
Conservative	David Hodson	1,398		
Conservative	Muhammad Raja	1,345		
Liberal Democrats	Matthew Bryant	414	8.58	▲3.32
Liberal Democrats	Simon James	355		
Liberal Democrats	Robert Bunce	324		
Registered electors		10,103		▲30
Turnout		4,659	46.12	▼5.85
Rejected ballots		6	0.13	▼0.06
Labour hold				
Labour hold				
Labour hold				

=== West Hill ===
West Hill (2)
Party	Candidate	Votes	%	±%
Conservative	Beryl Jeffery*	1,866	56.13	▲2.15
Conservative	Malcolm Grimston	1,811		
Labour	Denis Meehan	1,180	35.81	▼0.26
Labour	Maureen Walsh	1,166		
Liberal Democrats	Winifred Hayes	268	8.06	▲3.50
Liberal Democrats	Laurence Spicer	259		
Registered electors		6,163		▼143
Turnout		3,407	55.28	▼6.31
Rejected ballots		6	0.18	▼0.08
Conservative hold				
Conservative hold				

=== West Putney ===
West Putney (3)
Party	Candidate	Votes	%	±%
Conservative	William Hawkins*	2,796	61.75	▲3.72
Conservative	Mary Holben*	2,768		
Conservative	Michael Simpson	2,589		
Labour	Judith Chegwidden	1,451	30.96	▲0.79
Labour	Elaine Aherne	1,349		
Labour	Walter Ross	1,288		
Liberal Democrats	David King	352	7.29	▲1.90
Liberal Democrats	Patrick Joy	338		
Liberal Democrats	Marco Martinez	273		
Registered electors		9,556		▼110
Turnout		4,728	49.48	▼10.28
Rejected ballots		10	0.21	▲0.11
Conservative hold				
Conservative hold				
Conservative hold				
