= 1998 Wandsworth London Borough Council election =

1998 local election in England

- 7 May 1998

61 seats up for election to Wandsworth London Borough Council 31 seats needed for a majority
- Registered: 198,318
- Turnout: 78,099, 39.38% (▼10.62)
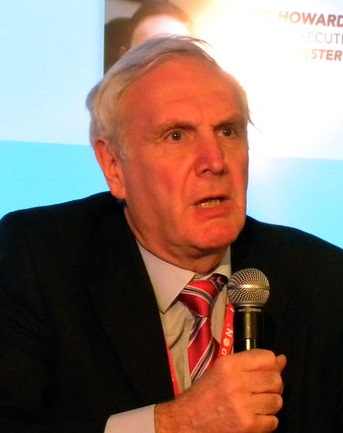

	First party	Second party	Third party
Leader	Edward Lister	Unknown	Unknown
Party	Conservative	Labour	Liberal Democrats
Leader since	1992	Unknown	Unknown
Leader's seat	Thamesfield	Unknown	Unknown
Last election	45 seats, 50.03%	16 seats, 39.82%	0 seats, 9.11%
Seats won	50	11	0
Seat change	▲5	▼5	Steady
Popular vote	109,351	74,827	17,495
Percentage	53.42%	36.55%	8.55%
Swing	▲3.39	▼3.27	▼0.56
Council control before election
Conservative
Council control before election
Conservative

The 1998 Wandsworth Council election took place on 7 May 1998 to elect members of Wandsworth London Borough Council in London, England. The whole council was up for election and the Conservative Party stayed in overall control of the council.

At the same time as the election Wandsworth saw 74.3% vote in favour of the 1998 Greater London Authority referendum and 25.7% against, on a 38.7% turnout.

== Background ==
There were no by-elections in the 4 years between the 1994 election and this one. The only change to the council was one defection to a third party which left the composition of the council just before the election looking like this:

↓
15	45	1
Labour	Conservative	Other

== Campaign ==
In the run up to the election a private Conservative poll was leaked which showed them 17% behind Labour and likely to only win in 4 wards as compared to 18 for Labour. However Labour and the Liberal Democrats accused the Conservatives of leaking the poll in order to lower expectations. The Conservatives would have lost control of the council on a 7% swing from the 1994 election, or if the 1997 general election results in the area were repeated. However Wandsworth had low council tax levels, the lowest in the country, and the Conservatives had recently cut the tax by 24%. This meant commentators expected the Conservatives to stay in control of what was described as their showpiece council.

For the election 9 of the 22 wards that made up the council were seen as being marginal.

== Election result ==
The results saw the Conservatives increase their control of the council gaining an extra 5 seats. This meant that with 50 seats the Conservatives had the most seats they had yet had on the council. Labour lost seats in St John and Roehampton wards, which was put down to the closure of the local Queen Mary's Hospital. Voter turnout at 40% was 10% down on the previous 1994 election.

1998 Wandsworth London Borough Council local elections results
Party	Seats	Gains	Losses	Net gain/loss	Seats %	Votes %	Votes	+/−
Conservative	50	6	1	▲5	81.97	53.42	109,351	▲3.39
Labour	11	1	6	▼5	18.03	36.55	74,827	▼3.27
Liberal Democrats	0	0	0	Steady	0.00	8.55	17,495	▼0.56
Green	0	0	0	Steady	0.00	1.48	3,037	▲0.61
Total	61						204,710	

After the election the composition of the council was as follows:

↓
11	50
Labour	Conservative

== Ward results ==
(*) - Indicates an incumbent candidate

(†) - Indicates an incumbent candidate standing in a different ward

=== Balham ===
Balham (3)
Party	Candidate	Votes	%	±%
Conservative	Guy Hurley	2,101	54.82	▲0.87
Conservative	Bernadina Ayonrinde*	2,049		
Conservative	Andrew White	2,049		
Labour	Mark Grindrod	1,254	31.92	▼6.15
Labour	Martin Tupper	1,187		
Labour	Vera Thompson^{†} (Note: Thompson was a sitting councillor representing the Roehampton ward)	1,168		
Liberal Democrats	Simon Brown	259	6.86	▼1.12
Liberal Democrats	David Cooke-Yarborough	259		
Liberal Democrats	Matthew Green	258		
Green	Lauren Paterson	241	6.39	New
Registered electors		9,260		▲221
Turnout		3,825	41.31	▼9.78
Rejected ballots		12	0.31	▲0.14
Conservative hold				
Conservative hold				
Conservative hold				

=== Bedford ===
Bedford (3)
Party	Candidate	Votes	%	±%
Conservative	Colin Dawe*	1,884	48.01	▲3.27
Conservative	Stewart Finn	1,823		
Conservative	Sheldon Wilkie	1,675		
Labour	Neville Daniels	1,551	38.46	▼1.91
Labour	Leonie Cooper	1,444		
Labour	Phillip Gibby	1,316		
Green	John Rattray	391	7.51	▲1.14
Liberal Democrats	Amanda Weils	272	6.03	▼0.13
Liberal Democrats	Christopher Reilly	207		
Liberal Democrats	Richard Williams	197		
Green	Albert Vickery	170		
Registered electors		9,642		Steady
Turnout		3,902	40.47	▼8.47
Rejected ballots		22	0.56	▲0.41
Conservative hold				
Conservative hold				
Conservative hold				

=== Earlsfield ===
Earlsfield (2)
Party	Candidate	Votes	%	±%
Conservative	Angela Graham*	1,642	54.55	▲2.97
Conservative	Charles McNaught-Davis	1,413		
Labour	Annabel Arndt	1,019	35.88	▼4.64
Labour	Martin Leigh	990		
Liberal Democrats	Julie Benson	146	4.64	▼0.57
Green	Tracey Thorn	138	4.93	New
Liberal Democrats	Anthony Fennelly	114		
Registered electors		6,731		▲140
Turnout		2,942	43.71	▼9.44
Rejected ballots		10	0.34	▲0.03
Conservative hold				
Conservative hold				

=== East Putney ===
East Putney (3)
Party	Candidate	Votes	%	±%
Conservative	Leslie McDonnell	2,191	61.88	▲3.10
Conservative	Diana Whittingham*	2,102		
Conservative	Brian Prichard*	2,076		
Labour	Elizabeth McNeil	1,023	27.35	▼3.99
Labour	Edward Kenny	998		
Labour	Samuel Uwadiae	794		
Liberal Democrats	Russell Pyne	398	10.77	▲0.89
Liberal Democrats	Susan Shocket	377		
Liberal Democrats	Nasser Butt	334		
Registered electors		10,303		▲264
Turnout		3,681	35.73	▼9.52
Rejected ballots		13	0.35	▲0.26
Conservative hold				
Conservative hold				
Conservative hold				

=== Fairfield ===
Fairfield (2)
Party	Candidate	Votes	%	±%
Conservative	Vanessa Graham*	1,658	63.69	▲9.15
Conservative	Tessa Strickland	1,502		
Labour	Suzanne L'Estrange	767	30.75	▼9.03
Labour	Stuart Bean	759		
Liberal Democrats	Patrick Warren	170	5.56	▼0.12
Liberal Democrats	Julius Maaten	106		
Registered electors		5,995		▲17
Turnout		2,666	44.47	▼13.93
Rejected ballots		10	0.38	▲0.29
Conservative hold				
Conservative hold				

=== Furzedown ===
Furzedown (3)
Party	Candidate	Votes	%	±%
Labour	John Farebrother	1,963	45.57	▲1.14
Labour	Jane Briginshaw	1,949		
Conservative	Ian Hart*	1,896	43.62	▼2.57
Labour	Margaret Hepburn	1,835		
Conservative	Ian Cheshire	1,812		
Conservative	Oliver Lodge	1,794		
Liberal Democrats	Catherine Hill	301	5.53	▼0.18
Liberal Democrats	Timothy Knight	231		
Green	Richard Ekhsigian	222	5.28	▲1.60
Liberal Democrats	David Patterson	166		
Registered electors		10,356		▼304
Turnout		4,421	42.69	▼8.86
Rejected ballots		35	0.79	▲0.72
Labour gain from Conservative				
Labour hold				
Conservative hold				

=== Graveney ===
Graveney (3)
Party	Candidate	Votes	%	±%
Labour	Andrew Gibbons*	1,732	45.87	▼2.34
Labour	Pamela Tatlow	1,524		
Labour	Thakur Hosain	1,481		
Liberal Democrats	Mark Green	1,150	30.69	▲2.87
Liberal Democrats	Simon James	1,068		
Liberal Democrats	Ulrica Zetterlund	952		
Conservative	Ian Chandler	673	16.64	▼2.54
Conservative	David de Winton	528		
Conservative	Sarah Whitehouse	518		
Green	Martin Williams	234	6.80	▲2.01
Registered electors		10,533		▲428
Turnout		3,644	34.60	▼13.67
Rejected ballots		9	0.25	▲0.11
Labour hold				
Labour hold				
Labour hold				

=== Latchmere ===
Latchmere (3)
Party	Candidate	Votes	%	±%
Labour	Anthony Belton*	1,233	50.33	▼1.72
Labour	Maurice Johnson*	1,160		
Labour	Samantha Heath*	1,153		
Conservative	Alistair Crellin^{†} (Note: Crellin was a sitting councillor representing the Shaftesbury ward)	1,104	44.13	▲2.29
Conservative	Robert Mackay	1,046		
Conservative	Charles Walker	959		
Liberal Democrats	Henrietta Norman	144	5.54	▼0.57
Liberal Democrats	Derek Elsley	128		
Liberal Democrats	Gordon Folkard	118		
Registered electors		8,243		▼27
Turnout		2,615	31.72	▼14.04
Rejected ballots		9	0.34	▲0.18
Labour hold				
Labour hold				
Labour hold				

=== Nightingale ===
Nightingale (3)
Party	Candidate	Votes	%	±%
Conservative	Evelyn McDermott^{†} (Note: McDermott was a sitting councillor representing the Furzedown ward)	1,978	51.12	▼2.58
Conservative	Maurice Heaster*	1,951		
Conservative	Ravindra Govindia*	1,913		
Labour	Michael Bell	1,469	36.81	▼0.07
Labour	Annamarie Critchard	1,426		
Labour	Lisa Wrigley	1,311		
Liberal Democrats	Christine Green	281	6.11	▼3.31
Green	Kerry Gormley	240	5.96	New
Liberal Democrats	Karin Joachim	215		
Green	Bruce Mackenzie	214		
Liberal Democrats	Ivor Strong	202		
Registered electors		9,544		▲133
Turnout		3,958	41.47	▼6.73
Rejected ballots		18	0.45	▲0.32
Conservative hold				
Conservative hold				
Conservative hold				

=== Northcote ===
Northcote (3)
Party	Candidate	Votes	%	±%
Conservative	Clive Dixon*	2,288	61.83	▲5.18
Conservative	Gordon Passmore*	2,217		
Conservative	Martin Johnson*	2,211		
Labour	Tracey van Tongeren	948	24.55	▼1.28
Labour	Eric Joseph	883		
Labour	Michael Lowhing	835		
Liberal Democrats	Charles Cronin	335	7.90	▼0.03
Liberal Democrats	Siobhan Vitelli	286		
Liberal Democrats	Richard Allen	237		
Green	Richmond Crowhurst	207	5.72	▼3.87
Registered electors		9,100		▲120
Turnout		3,683	40.47	▼9.61
Rejected ballots		7	0.19	▲0.12
Conservative hold				
Conservative hold				
Conservative hold				

=== Parkside ===
Parkside (2)
Party	Candidate	Votes	%	±%
Conservative	Elizabeth Howlett*	1,580	59.49	▲4.53
Conservative	Jeremy Swan	1,425		
Labour	Michael Tuer	876	32.57	▼3.09
Labour	Robert Unsworth	769		
Liberal Democrats	Catherine Devons	205	7.94	▼1.44
Liberal Democrats	David Berryman	196		
Registered electors		5,931		▲27
Turnout		2,689	45.34	▼10.83
Rejected ballots		18	0.67	▲0.46
Conservative hold				
Conservative hold				

=== Queenstown ===
Queenstown (2)
Party	Candidate	Votes	%	±%
Conservative	Carol Humphries*	1,489	57.33	▲3.18
Conservative	Richard Vivian*	1,325		
Labour	David Arnos	997	37.39	▼2.85
Labour	Hywel Lloyd	838		
Liberal Democrats	Joanna Martin-Kaye	145	5.28	▼0.33
Liberal Democrats	Ashley Jones	114		
Registered electors		7,099		▲183
Turnout		2,683	37.79	▼8.97
Rejected ballots		8	0.30	▲0.18
Conservative hold				
Conservative hold				

=== Roehampton ===
Roehampton (3)
Party	Candidate	Votes	%	±%
Conservative	Thomas Harris	1,570	49.56	▲11.37
Conservative	Michael Simpson^{†} (Note: Simpson was a sitting councillor representing the West Putney ward)	1,495		
Conservative	Hugh Lumby	1,491		
Labour	Peter Ackhurst	1,346	42.23	▼8.41
Labour	Denis Meehan	1,282		
Labour	Maureen Walsh	1,254		
Liberal Democrats	Nicholas Leggett	293	8.21	▼2.96
Liberal Democrats	Valerie Shelmerdine	258		
Liberal Democrats	Patrick Wallace	204		
Registered electors		8,844		▼85
Turnout		3,338	37.74	▼13.32
Rejected ballots		4	0.12	▼0.12
Conservative gain from Labour				
Conservative gain from Labour				
Conservative gain from Labour				

=== St John ===
St John (3)
Party	Candidate	Votes	%	±%
Conservative	Toby Beresford	1,729	53.95	▲10.41
Conservative	Ronald Smith	1,637		
Conservative	Piers McCausland	1,603		
Labour	Aiden Grimes*	1,275	38.77	▼10.11
Labour	Derek Sutton*	1,200		
Labour	Anthony Tuck*	1,096		
Liberal Democrats	Andrew Crick	248	7.28	▼0.30
Liberal Democrats	Lily Stewart	224		
Liberal Democrats	Alan Giles	198		
Registered electors		9,908		▲576
Turnout		3,402	34.34	▼10.89
Rejected ballots		24	0.71	▲0.62
Conservative gain from Labour				
Conservative gain from Labour				
Conservative gain from Labour				

=== St Mary's Park ===
St Mary's Park (3)
Party	Candidate	Votes	%	±%
Conservative	Adrian Flook*	2,104	55.98	▲4.11
Conservative	John Hallmark	2,048		
Conservative	Simon Williams	1,952		
Labour	Paul Comer	1,228	32.30	▼3.95
Labour	Toby Naish	1,180		
Labour	Yemi Odemo	1,114		
Green	Caroline Austin	259	7.13	▲1.60
Liberal Democrats	David Owen-Jones	223	4.59	▼1.76
Liberal Democrats	Christopher Woodley	160		
Liberal Democrats	Sanjay Samani	117		
Registered electors		9,123		▲71
Turnout		3,679	40.33	▼10.01
Rejected ballots		14	0.38	▲0.27
Conservative hold				
Conservative hold				
Conservative hold				

=== Shaftesbury ===
Shaftesbury (3)
Party	Candidate	Votes	%	±%
Conservative	Philip Beddows	2,063	54.12	▼2.62
Conservative	James Cousins	2,002		
Conservative	John Senior*	1,994		
Labour	Christine Eccles	1,321	33.91	▼0.60
Labour	Anastasia Chrysos	1,277		
Labour	Richard Moir	1,199		
Liberal Democrats	Penelope Umbers	262	5.59	▼3.16
Green	Pauline Illsley	238	6.38	New
Liberal Democrats	John Barnett	211		
Liberal Democrats	James Sparling	153		
Registered electors		10,096		▲169
Turnout		3,814	37.78	▼11.26
Rejected ballots		5	0.13	▼0.03
Conservative hold				
Conservative hold				
Conservative hold				

=== Southfield ===
Southfield (3)
Party	Candidate	Votes	%	±%
Conservative	Stephen Lorch	2,554	58.23	▲9.02
Conservative	Janice Leigh	2,536		
Conservative	Nicholas Longworth	2,503		
Labour	Keir Fitch	1,520	33.26	▼3.32
Labour	Pauline Brueseke (Note: Brueseke was a sitting councillor representing the Roehampton ward)	1,448		
Labour	Gavin Reddin	1,369		
Liberal Democrats	Anna Ahmed	428	8.51	▲1.02
Liberal Democrats	James Durrant	389		
Liberal Democrats	Anthony Burrett	293		
Registered electors		10,457		▲422
Turnout		4,627	44.25	▼12.11
Rejected ballots		14	0.30	▲0.05
Conservative hold				
Conservative hold				
Conservative hold				

=== Springfield ===
Springfield (3)
Party	Candidate	Votes	%	±%
Conservative	Katharine Tracey*	2,459	55.72	▲3.72
Conservative	Margaret Mervis*	2,401		
Conservative	John Garrett*	2,397		
Labour	Bob Bayman	1,519	33.76	▼1.21
Labour	Paul Baverstock	1,443		
Labour	Dominic McElroy	1,435		
Liberal Democrats	Arminel Fennelly	255	5.38	▼1.70
Liberal Democrats	Jayne Martin-Kaye	231		
Green	Samantha Guy	223	5.14	▼0.81
Liberal Democrats	Christopher Salaman	215		
Registered electors		10,658		▲170
Turnout		4,458	41.83	▼9.05
Rejected ballots		7	0.16	▲0.01
Conservative hold				
Conservative hold				
Conservative hold				

=== Thamesfield ===
Thamesfield (3)
Party	Candidate	Votes	%	±%
Conservative	Roger Bird	2,566	64.06	▲4.87
Conservative	Edward Lister*	2,551		
Conservative	Lois Lees*	2,543		
Labour	Marcia Davies	1,034	24.48	▼4.30
Labour	Christopher Locke	1,029		
Labour	Muzaffar-Ud-Din Khan	864		
Liberal Democrats	Simon Campbell-Jones	516	11.46	▼0.57
Liberal Democrats	Moira Sanders	480		
Liberal Democrats	Martha Zantindes	374		
Registered electors		10,348		▲285
Turnout		4,208	40.66	▼8.85
Rejected ballots		15	0.36	▲0.24
Conservative hold				
Conservative hold				
Conservative hold				

=== Tooting ===
Tooting (3)
Party	Candidate	Votes	%	±%
Labour	Sadiq Khan*	1,835	54.61	▼3.99
Labour	Jane White	1,793		
Labour	Stuart King	1,765		
Conservative	Gregory Barker	986	28.83	▼3.99
Conservative	Margaret Heriot	970		
Conservative	Andrew Scantlebury	891		
Liberal Democrats	Michael Clifton	333	8.67	▲0.09
Liberal Democrats	Ignatius Kane	279		
Green	Rajeev Thacker	260	7.90	New
Liberal Democrats	Robert Bunce	244		
Registered electors		10,261		▲158
Turnout		3,552	34.62	▼9.50
Rejected ballots		8	0.23	▲0.10
Labour hold				
Labour hold				
Labour hold				

=== West Hill ===
West Hill (2)
Party	Candidate	Votes	%	±%
Conservative	Beryl Jeffery*	1,462	60.70	▲4.57
Conservative	Malcolm Grimston*	1,441		
Labour	Robert Knowles	702	29.08	▼6.73
Labour	Duncan Braithwaite^{†} (Note: Braithwaite was a sitting councillor representing the Graveney ward)	689		
Liberal Democrats	Jamie Angus	251	10.22	▲2.16
Liberal Democrats	Laurence Spicer	238		
Registered electors		6,143		▼20
Turnout		2,563	41.72	▼13.56
Rejected ballots		5	0.20	▲0.02
Conservative hold				
Conservative hold				

=== West Putney ===
West Putney (3)
Party	Candidate	Votes	%	±%
Conservative	William Hawkins*	2,347	63.19	▲1.44
Conservative	Martin Calderbank	2,205		
Conservative	Nadhim Zahawi^{†} (Note: Zahawi was a sitting councillor representing the Thamesfield)	1,979		
Labour	Maureen Booker	1,141	28.62	▼2.34
Labour	Donald Roy	928		
Labour	Alan Petrides	889		
Liberal Democrats	Andrew Cunningham	317	8.19	▲0.90
Liberal Democrats	Allen Johnston	272		
Liberal Democrats	Katherine Riviere	258		
Registered electors		9,743		▲187
Turnout		3,749	38.48	▼11.00
Rejected ballots		8	0.21	Steady
Conservative hold				
Conservative hold				
Conservative hold				
