= West Putney =

Electoral ward in the London Borough of Wandsworth

- Electoral ward for the Wandsworth London Borough Council
- West Putney ward boundaries since 2022
- Borough: Wandsworth
- County: Greater London
- Population: 16,910 (2021) (Note: 2021 Census data reported for 2022 ward boundaries)
- Electorate: 12,025 (2022)
- Area: 2.506 square kilometres (0.968 sq mi)

Current electoral ward
- Created: 1978
- Number of members: 3
- Councillors: Nick Austin; Melanie Hampton; Shakeel Ahmad
- GSS code: E05014030

West Putney is an electoral ward in the London Borough of Wandsworth. The ward was first used in the 1978 elections. It returns councillors to Wandsworth London Borough Council.

== Councillors ==
Election	Councillors		
1990	William Hawkins (Conservative Party)	Mary Holben (Conservative Party)	Eric Somerville-Jones (Conservative Party)
1994	William Hawkins (Conservative Party)	Mary Holben (Conservative Party)	Michael Simpson (Conservative Party)
1998	William Hawkins (Conservative Party)	Martin Calderbank (Conservative Party)	Nadhim Zahawi (Conservative Party)
2002	Jane Cooper (Conservative Party)	Martin Hime (Conservative Party)	Nadhim Zahawi (Conservative Party)
2006	Jane Cooper (Conservative Party)	Ruth Stokes (Conservative Party)	Andrew Penfold (Conservative Party)
2010	Jane Cooper (Conservative Party)	Liz Stokes (Conservative Party)	Steffi Sutters (Conservative Party)
2014	Jane Cooper (Conservative Party)	Ian Lewer (Conservative Party)	Steffi Sutters (Conservative Party)
2018	Jane Cooper (Conservative Party)	Ian Lewer (Conservative Party)	Steffi Sutters (Conservative Party)
2022	Claire Gilbert (Labour Party)	Jeremy Ambache (Labour Party)	Steffi Sutters (Conservative Party)
2024 By-	Nick Austin (Conservative Party)	Jeremy Ambache (Labour Party)	Steffi Sutters (Conservative Party)
2026	Nick Austin (Conservative Party)	Melanie Hampton (Conservative Party)	Shakeel Ahmad (Conservative Party)

== Wandsworth council elections since 2022 ==
=== 2024 by-election ===
The by-election was held on 2 May 2024, following the resignation of Claire Gilbert. It took place on the same day as the 2024 London mayoral election, the 2024 London Assembly election and 14 other borough council by-elections across London.

2024 West Putney by-election
Party	Candidate	Votes	%	±%
Conservative	Nick Austin	2,839	45.3	+1.3
Labour	Jane Briginshaw	2,350	37.5	−7.7
Liberal Democrats	Mark Lejman	635	10.1	+1.2
Green	Joseph McEntee	438	7.0	−2.1
Majority		489		
Turnout		6262	52	
Conservative gain from Labour				

=== 2022 election ===
The election took place on 5 May 2022.

2022 Wandsworth London Borough Council election: West Putney
Party	Candidate	Votes	%
Labour	Jeremy Ambache	2,676	46.5
Labour	Claire Gilbert	2,605	45.2
Conservative	Steffi Sutters	2,534	44.0
Conservative	Paddy Reid	2,519	43.7
Conservative	Ian Lewer	2,409	41.8
Labour	Graham Loveland	2,239	38.9
Green	Tahira Amini	524	9.1
Liberal Democrats	Joanna Chidgey	515	8.9
Green	Julie Estelle	473	8.2
Liberal Democrats	Cait Hart Dyke	342	5.9
Turnout		5,758	
Labour win (new boundaries)			
Labour win (new boundaries)			
Conservative win (new boundaries)			

== 2002–2022 Wandsworth council elections ==
There was a revision of ward boundaries in Wandsworth in 2002.

=== 2018 election ===
The election took place on 3 May 2018.

2018 Wandsworth London Borough Council election: West Putney
Party	Candidate	Votes	%	±%
Conservative	Jane Cooper	2,684	54.4	
Conservative	Ian Lewer	2,604	52.8	
Conservative	Steffi Sutters	2,584	52.4	
Labour	Yasin Inan	1,419	28.8	
Labour	Jim McKinney	1,405	28.5	
Labour	Susan Olech	1,304	26.4	
Liberal Democrats	Helen Compson	580	11.8	
Liberal Democrats	Charles Gillbe	458	9.3	
Liberal Democrats	Sharon Davis	419	8.5	
Green	Emma Killick	369	7.5	
Green	Jennifer Pang	342	6.9	
Green	Christopher Poole	266	5.4	
Turnout		4,931	43.97	
Conservative hold		Swing		
Conservative hold		Swing		
Conservative hold		Swing		
