= West Hill, Wandsworth =

Road in Wandsworth, London

Coordinates: 51.456747°N 0.199769°W

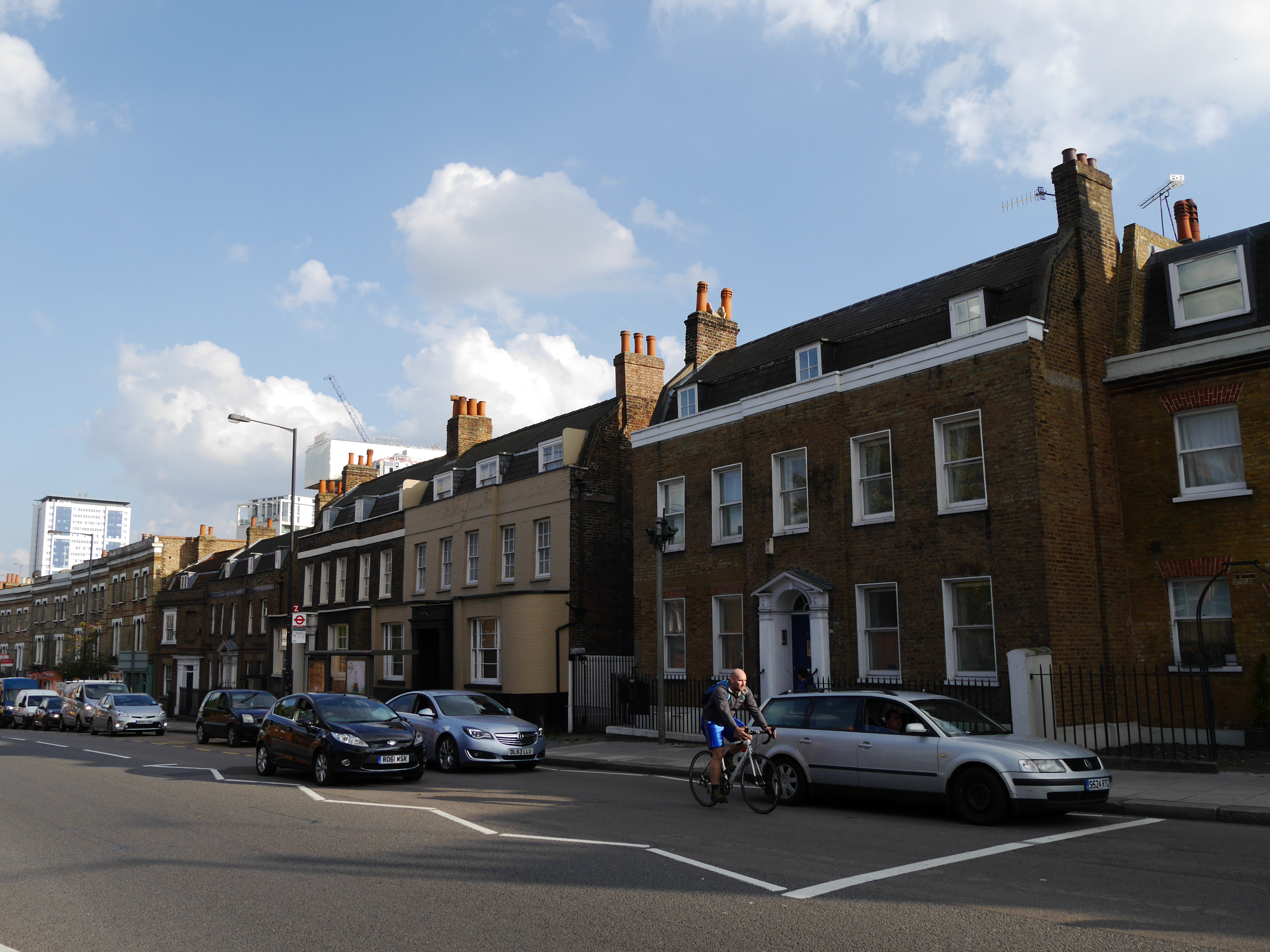
West Hill, Wandsworth

West Hill is a road in Wandsworth, London. It runs west–east, from the junction with the A219 at Tibbet's Corner near Putney Heath to the junction with Putney Bridge Road and Merton Road in the east, where it becomes Wandsworth High Street. It is part of the A3, and the eastern end is also part of the South Circular Road.

On the south side of the road at its far eastern end, there is a series of houses, built in the mid-18th to early 19th centuries, and all Grade II listed.

== Governance ==
West Hill is part of the Putney constituency for elections to the House of Commons of the United Kingdom, currently represented by Fleur Anderson from the Labour Party.

West Hill is covered by the West Hill ward for elections to Wandsworth London Borough Council.
