= 1964 Wandsworth London Borough Council election =

English local election

The 1964 Wandsworth Council election took place on 7 May 1964 to elect members of Wandsworth London Borough Council in England. The whole council was up for election and the Labour party gained control of the council.

== Background ==
These elections were the first to the newly formed borough. Previously elections had taken place in the Metropolitan Borough of Battersea and Metropolitan Borough of Wandsworth. These boroughs were merged by the London Government Act 1963 to form the new London Borough of Wandsworth.

A total of 169 candidates stood in the election for the 60 seats being contested across 20 wards. These included a full slate from the Conservative and Labour parties, while the Liberals stood 35 candidates. Other candidates included 15 Communists, 4 Independents and 1 Rad Lib. All wards were three-seat wards.

This election had aldermen as well as directly elected councillors. Labour won all 10 aldermen.

The Council was elected in 1964 as a "shadow authority" but did not start operations until 1 April 1965.

== Election result ==
The results saw Labour gain the new council with a majority of 34 after winning 47 of the 60 seats. Overall turnout in the election was 35.0%. This turnout included 1,514 postal votes.

== Ward results ==
Balham (3)
Party	Candidate	Votes	%	±%
Turnout		3,796	35.8	
	Conservative win (new seat)			
	Labour win (new seat)			
	Conservative win (new seat)			

Bedford (3)
Party	Candidate	Votes	%	±%
Turnout		3,447	32.8	
	Conservative win (new seat)			
	Conservative win (new seat)			
	Conservative win (new seat)			

Earlsfield (3)
Party	Candidate	Votes	%	±%
Turnout		3,232	30.1	
	Labour win (new seat)			
	Labour win (new seat)			
	Labour win (new seat)			

Fairfield (3)
Party	Candidate	Votes	%	±%
Turnout		3,193	30.5	
	Labour win (new seat)			
	Labour win (new seat)			
	Labour win (new seat)			

Furzedown (3)
Party	Candidate	Votes	%	±%
Turnout		3,907	34.0	
	Labour win (new seat)			
	Labour win (new seat)			
	Labour win (new seat)			

Graveney (3)
Party	Candidate	Votes	%	±%
Turnout		3,652	32.2	
	Labour win (new seat)			
	Labour win (new seat)			
	Labour win (new seat)			

Latchmere (3)
Party	Candidate	Votes	%	±%
Turnout		2,613	24.7	
	Labour win (new seat)			
	Labour win (new seat)			
	Labour win (new seat)			

Nightingale (3)
Party	Candidate	Votes	%	±%
Turnout		4,016	34.2	
	Conservative win (new seat)			
	Conservative win (new seat)			
	Conservative win (new seat)			

Northcote (3)
Party	Candidate	Votes	%	±%
Turnout		4,277	40.6	
	Labour win (new seat)			
	Labour win (new seat)			
	Labour win (new seat)			

Putney (3)
Party	Candidate	Votes	%	±%
Turnout		5,495	39.9	
	Conservative win (new seat)			
	Conservative win (new seat)			
	Conservative win (new seat)			

Queenstown (3)
Party	Candidate	Votes	%	±%
Turnout		2,128	20.4	
	Labour win (new seat)			
	Labour win (new seat)			
	Labour win (new seat)			

Roehampton (3)
Party	Candidate	Votes	%	±%
Turnout		5,232	43.0	
	Labour win (new seat)			
	Labour win (new seat)			
	Labour win (new seat)			

St John (3)
Party	Candidate	Votes	%	±%
Turnout		3,337	31.0	
	Labour win (new seat)			
	Labour win (new seat)			
	Labour win (new seat)			

St Mary's Park (3)
Party	Candidate	Votes	%	±%
Turnout		3,758	35.2	
	Labour win (new seat)			
	Labour win (new seat)			
	Labour win (new seat)			

Shaftesbury (3)
Party	Candidate	Votes	%	±%
Turnout		4,109	36.5	
	Labour win (new seat)			
	Labour win (new seat)			
	Labour win (new seat)			

Southfield (3)
Party	Candidate	Votes	%	±%
Turnout		4,342	38.2	
	Labour win (new seat)			
	Labour win (new seat)			
	Labour win (new seat)			

Springfield (3)
Party	Candidate	Votes	%	±%
Turnout		4,657	41.0	
	Labour win (new seat)			
	Labour win (new seat)			
	Labour win (new seat)			

Thamesfield (3)
Party	Candidate	Votes	%	±%
Turnout		4,728	41.1	
	Conservative win (new seat)			
	Labour win (new seat)			
	Conservative win (new seat)			

Tooting (3)
Party	Candidate	Votes	%	±%
Turnout		3,267	30.5	
	Labour win (new seat)			
	Labour win (new seat)			
	Labour win (new seat)			

West Hill (3)
Party	Candidate	Votes	%	±%
Turnout		5,252	43.7	
