= Fairfield (Wandsworth ward) =

- Former electoral ward for the Wandsworth London Borough Council
- Fairfield ward boundaries from 2002 to 2022
- Borough: Wandsworth
- County: Greater London
- Electorate: 11,038 (2018)
- Major settlements: Wandsworth Town

Former electoral ward
- Created: 1965
- Abolished: 2022
- Councillors: 3
- Replaced by: East Putney, Falconbrook, St Mary's, Wandsworth Town
- ONS code: 00BJGD
- GSS code: E05000614

Fairfield was an electoral ward in the London Borough of Wandsworth from 1965 to 2022. The ward was first used in the 1964 elections and last used for the 2018 elections. There was a revision of ward boundaries in 1978 and 2002. It returned three councillors to Wandsworth London Borough Council.

== 2002–2022 Wandsworth council elections ==
There was a revision of ward boundaries in Wandsworth in 2002.

The third iteration of the Fairfield ward contained much of Wandsworth Town and a large neighbourhood in Battersea. It contained one side of Wandsworth High Street, Old York Road and the Wandsworth council buildings. The ward formed a cross shape, running from Mexfield Road on the edge of Putney in the west, to Plough Road near Clapham Junction in the east, and from the River Thames to the west of Wandsworth Bridge in the north, to Allfarthing Lane to the east of Garratt Lane in the south.

=== 2018 election ===
The election took place on 3 May 2018.

2018 Wandsworth London Borough Council election: Fairfield (3)
| Party | Candidate | Votes | % | ±% |
|---|---|---|---|---|
| Conservative | Piers McCausland | 2,235 | 50.9 | |
| Conservative | William Sweet | 2,172 | 49.5 | |
| Conservative | Rory O'Broin | 2,154 | 49.1 | |
| Labour | Juliana Annan | 1,430 | 32.6 | |
| Labour | Lynne Jackson | 1,414 | 32.2 | |
| Labour | Ian Jewesbury | 1,351 | 30.8 | |
| Green | David Carlyon | 533 | 12.1 | |
| Liberal Democrats | David Patterson | 443 | 10.1 | |
| Liberal Democrats | Patrick Warren | 355 | 8.1 | |
| Renew | George Hilton | 321 | 7.3 | |
| Liberal Democrats | Paul Scaping | 316 | 7.2 | |
| Turnout | | 4,387 | 39.74 | |
| Conservative hold | | Swing | | |
| Conservative hold | | Swing | | |
| Conservative hold | | Swing | | |

=== 2014 election ===
The election took place on 22 May 2014.

=== 2010 election ===
The election on 6 May 2010 took place on the same day as the United Kingdom general election.

=== 2006 election ===
The election took place on 4 May 2006.

=== 2002 election ===
The election took place on 2 May 2002.

== 1978–2002 Wandsworth council elections ==
Fairfield ward boundaries from 1978 to 2002

There was a revision of ward boundaries in Wandsworth in 1978.

== 1964–1978 Wandsworth council elections ==
External image
- Map showing Fairfield ward boundaries from 1965 to 1978
