= 1986 Wandsworth London Borough Council election =

1986 local election in England

The 1986 Wandsworth Council election took place on 8 May 1986 to elect members of Wandsworth London Borough Council in London, England. The whole council was up for election and the Conservative Party stayed in overall control of the council.

== Ward results ==
Balham (3)
Party	Candidate	Votes	%	±%

Bedford (3)
Party	Candidate	Votes	%	±%

Earlsfield (2)
Party	Candidate	Votes	%	±%
Labour	Graham Loveland	1,364		
Conservative	Angela Graham	1,292		
Conservative	John Grimshaw	1,251		
Labour	Enley Taylor	1,184		
Alliance	David Patterson	1,038		
Alliance	Martin Morris	888		

East Putney (3)
Party	Candidate	Votes	%	±%

Fairfield (2)
Party	Candidate	Votes	%	±%

Furzedown (3)
Party	Candidate	Votes	%	±%

Graveney (3)
Party	Candidate	Votes	%	±%

Latchmere (3)
Party	Candidate	Votes	%	±%

Nightingale (3)
Party	Candidate	Votes	%	±%

Northcote (3)
Party	Candidate	Votes	%	±%

Parkside (2)
Party	Candidate	Votes	%	±%

Queenstown (2)
Party	Candidate	Votes	%	±%

Roehampton (3)
Party	Candidate	Votes	%	±%

St John (3)
Party	Candidate	Votes	%	±%

St Mary's Park (3)
Party	Candidate	Votes	%	±%

Shaftesbury (3)
Party	Candidate	Votes	%	±%

Southfield (3)
Party	Candidate	Votes	%	±%
Conservative	Michael Burnett	2,431		
Conservative	Peter Slater	2,371		
Conservative	Christine Thompson	2,356		
Labour	John Gibbs	2,213		
Labour	Stephen Gibbons	2,197		
Labour	Jacqueline Pearce	2,184		
Alliance	Jeremy Ambache	1,046		
Alliance	Andrew Greenfield	1,001		
Alliance	Gerard Walter	970		
Independent	Edward Larkin	118		
Independent	Terence Black	65		

Springfield (3)
Party	Candidate	Votes	%	±%

Thamesfield (3)
Party	Candidate	Votes	%	±%

Tooting (3)
Party	Candidate	Votes	%	±%

West Hill (2)
Party	Candidate	Votes	%	±%

West Putney (3)
Party	Candidate	Votes	%	±%

== By-elections (1982-1986) ==
=== 13 October 1983 ===
Earlsfield (1)
Party	Candidate	Votes	%	±%
Alliance	David Patterson (councillor)	1,263		
Labour	Patrick Roche	1,058		
Conservative	Angela Graham	658		
Independent Liberal	Edward Larkin	50		
Ecology (Green)	Elizabeth Shaw	30		
