= Bedford (ward) =

- Former electoral ward for the Wandsworth London Borough Council
- Bedford ward boundaries from 2002 to 2022
- Borough: Wandsworth
- County: Greater London
- Electorate: 11,214 (2018)
- Major settlements: Balham

Former electoral ward
- Created: 1965
- Abolished: 2022
- Councillors: 3
- ONS code: 00BJGA
- GSS code: E05000611

Bedford was an electoral ward in the London Borough of Wandsworth from 1965 to 2022. The ward was first used in the 1964 elections and last used for the 2018 elections, with two by-elections in 2021. There was a revision of ward boundaries in 1978 and 2002. It returned three councillors to Wandsworth London Borough Council.

== 2002–2022 Wandsworth council elections ==
There was a revision of ward boundaries in Wandsworth in 2002.

=== November 2021 by-election ===
The by-election took place on 25 November 2021, following the resignation Hannah Stanislaus.

November 2021 Bedford by-election
Party	Candidate	Votes	%	±%
Labour	Sheila Boswell	906	40.2	▼9.8
Conservative	Tom Mytton	905	40.2	▲5.7
Green	Roy Vickery	306	13.6	▲4.3
Liberal Democrats	Paul Tibbles	135	6.0	▼0.2
Majority		1	0.0	
Turnout		2252	21.7	
Labour hold		Swing		

=== May 2021 by-election ===
The by-election took place on 6 May 2021, following the resignation of Fleur Anderson.

May 2021 Bedford by-election
Party	Candidate	Votes	%	±%
Labour	Hannah Stanislaus	2,714	48.3	
Conservative	Tom Mytton	1,778	31.7	
Green	David Carlyon	815	14.5	
Liberal Democrats	Reeten Banerji	318	5.5	
Majority				
Turnout			51.4	
Labour hold		Swing		

=== 2018 election ===
The election took place on 3 May 2018.

2018 Wandsworth London Borough Council election: Bedford (3)
Party	Candidate	Votes	%	±%
Labour	Fleur Anderson	2,835	54.8	
Labour	Clare Fraser	2,719	52.6	
Labour	Hector Wakefield	2,376	46.0	
Conservative	Pippa Smith	1,955	37.8	
Conservative	Thom Norman	1,889	36.5	
Conservative	Shaun Wright	1,794	34.7	
Green	Albert Vickery	525	10.2	
Liberal Democrats	David Lane	354	6.8	
Liberal Democrats	Mark Robinson	317	6.1	
Liberal Democrats	William Woodward	295	5.7	
Turnout		5,169	46.09	
Labour hold		Swing		
Labour hold		Swing		
Labour gain from Conservative		Swing		
