= 2006 Wandsworth London Borough Council election =

2006 local election in England

- 4 May 2006

All 60 seats to Wandsworth London Borough Council 31 seats needed for a majority
	First party	Second party
Party	Conservative	Labour
Seats won	51	9
Seat change	▲1	▼1
Popular vote	41,617	19,734
Percentage	51.0%	24.2%
Swing	▲2.4%	▼7.1%
- Map of the results of the 2006 Wandsworth council election. Conservatives in blue and Labour in red.
Council control before election
Conservative
Council control after election
Conservative

The 2006 Wandsworth Council election took place on 4 May 2006 to elect members of Wandsworth London Borough Council in London, England. The whole council was up for election and the Conservative Party stayed in overall control of the council.

The Conservatives were always expected to hold control and the low rates of council tax in Wandsworth were used as an example by the Conservatives in neighbouring councils such as Hammersmith and Fulham. During the campaign one Labour candidate, Nick Bowes, had said that the party was being well beaten and described the campaign as being "miserable, exhausting and lonely".

== Election result ==
Wandsworth local election result 2006
Party	Seats	Gains	Losses	Net gain/loss	Seats %	Votes %	Votes	+/−
Conservative	51	2	1	+1	85.0	51.0	41,617	▲2.4
Labour	9	1	2	-1	15.0	24.2	19,734	▼7.1
Green	0	0	0	0	0.0	13.1	10,722	▲6.2
Liberal Democrats	0	0	0	0	0.0	10.7	8,747	▼0.7
Independent	0	0	0	0	0.0	0.9	719	▼0.7
Communist	0	0	0	0	0.0	0.2	136	New

== Ward results ==
=== Balham ===
Balham (3)
Party	Candidate	Votes	%	±%
Conservative	Elizabeth Forbes	2,284	55.8	
Conservative	Caroline Usher	2,171		
Conservative	Russell King	2,090		
Labour	Jennifer Hill	695	17.0	
Labour	Martin Tupper	668		
Green	Siobhan Vitelli	637	15.6	
Labour	Kiran O'Keeffe	616		
Liberal Democrats	Matthew Green	474	11.6	
Liberal Democrats	Joan Gibbs	465		
Turnout			32.4	
Conservative hold		Swing		
Conservative hold		Swing		
Conservative hold		Swing		

=== Bedford ===
Bedford (3)
Party	Candidate	Votes	%	±%
Conservative	Antonia Dunn	1,960	44.4	
Conservative	Stewart Finn	1,929		
Conservative	Sheldon Wilkie	1,836		
Labour	Peter Carpenter	1,093	24.7	
Labour	James Heath	1,093		
Labour	Wendy Speck	1,062		
Green	John Rattray	750	17.0	
Liberal Democrats	Henrietta Norman	521	11.8	
Liberal Democrats	Richard Williams	464		
Independent	Simon Phillips	95	2.1	
Turnout			34.2	
Conservative hold		Swing		
Conservative hold		Swing		
Conservative hold		Swing		

=== Earlsfield ===
Earlsfield (3)
Party	Candidate	Votes	%	±%
Conservative	Angela Graham	2,306	61.7	
Conservative	Marc Hope	2,206		
Conservative	Charles McNaught-Davis	2,006		
Labour	Nicola Brown	853	22.8	
Labour	Benjamin Evetts	799		
Labour	James Sachon	589		
Green	Graham Humphreys	577	15.4	
Turnout			30.8	
Conservative hold		Swing		
Conservative hold		Swing		
Conservative hold		Swing		

=== East Putney ===
East Putney (3)
Party	Candidate	Votes	%	±%
Conservative	Leslie McDonnell	2,450	60.4	
Conservative	Jeremy Larsson	2,387		
Conservative	Brian Prichard	2,241		
Green	Felicity Dwyer	582	14.3	
Labour	Eileen Flanagan	536	13.2	
Liberal Democrats	Jennifer Underwood	489	12.1	
Labour	Victoria Anifowoshe	482		
Labour	Eayad El-Miqdadi	467		
Liberal Democrats	Gerard Walter	352		
Liberal Democrats	Cyril Richert	322		
Turnout			32.5	
Conservative hold		Swing		
Conservative hold		Swing		
Conservative hold		Swing		

=== Fairfield ===
Fairfield (3)
Party	Candidate	Votes	%	±%
Conservative	Vanessa Graham	2,085	55.5	
Conservative	Piers McCausland	1,941		
Conservative	James Thom	1,891		
Labour	Beverley Saunders	668	17.8	
Labour	Brendan McMullan	664		
Green	Martin Williams	590	15.7	
Labour	Brian Tomlinson	575		
Liberal Democrats	Nicholas Lowe	413	11.0	
Liberal Democrats	Patrick Warren	404		
Turnout			30.1	
Conservative hold		Swing		
Conservative hold		Swing		
Conservative hold		Swing		

=== Furzedown ===
Furzedown (3)
Party	Candidate	Votes	%	±%
Conservative	Claire Clay	2,033	41.1	
Labour	John Farebrother	2,012	40.7	
Labour	Judith Gasser	2,010		
Labour	Mark Thomas	1,869		
Conservative	Sean Worth	1,856		
Conservative	William Morgan	1,837		
Green	Michael Day	584	11.8	
Liberal Democrats	Ashley Jones	316	6.4	
Liberal Democrats	Alan Giles	298		
Liberal Democrats	Michael Rodgers	274		
Turnout			44.0	
Conservative hold		Swing		
Labour hold		Swing		
Labour gain from Conservative		Swing		

=== Graveney ===
Graveney (3)
Party	Candidate	Votes	%	±%
Labour	Andrew Gibbons	1,547	34.2	
Labour	Rex Osborn	1,464		
Labour	Belinda Randall	1,422		
Liberal Democrats	Stephanie Dearden	1,244	27.5	
Liberal Democrats	Norsheen Bhatti	1,213		
Liberal Democrats	Jeremy Ambache	1,111		
Conservative	Melanie Kelly	1,006	22.3	
Conservative	John Locker	952		
Conservative	Jhansi Ridgeon	848		
Green	Timothy Turner	489	10.8	
Independent	Vallipuram Kulendran	231	5.1	
Turnout			38.2	
Labour hold		Swing		
Labour hold		Swing		
Labour hold		Swing		

=== Latchmere ===
Latchmere (3)
Party	Candidate	Votes	%	±%
Labour	Anthony Belton	1,778	44.5	
Labour	Leonie Cooper	1,772		
Labour	Maurice Johnson	1,687		
Conservative	Philippa Hill	1,671	41.8	
Conservative	Matthew Desborough-Hurst	1,668		
Conservative	Terence Walsh	1,482		
Green	Marian Hoffman	545	13.6	
Turnout			38.0	
Labour hold		Swing		
Labour hold		Swing		
Labour hold		Swing		

=== Nightingale ===
Nightingale (3)
Party	Candidate	Votes	%	±%
Conservative	Sarah McDermott	2,102	49.4	
Conservative	Ian Hart	2,021		
Conservative	Ravindra Govindia	2,019		
Green	Bruce Mackenzie	802	18.8	
Labour	Kathleen Anderson	773	18.2	
Labour	Rhian Williams	616		
Labour	Alexander Lisinge	614		
Liberal Democrats	Simon Shields	579	13.6	
Liberal Democrats	Anthony Fennelly	536		
Turnout			32.2	
Conservative hold		Swing		
Conservative hold		Swing		
Conservative hold		Swing		

=== Northcote ===
Northcote (3)
Party	Candidate	Votes	%	±%
Conservative	Philip Beddows	2,339	56.3	
Conservative	Peter Dawson	2,293		
Conservative	Martin Johnson	2,221		
Green	Guy Evans	686	16.5	
Labour	Karen Byrne	649	15.6	
Labour	Shalu Kanal	555		
Labour	Paul Nolan	482		
Liberal Democrats	Christine Green	477	11.5	
Liberal Democrats	Charles Cronin	456		
Turnout			32.9	
Conservative hold		Swing		
Conservative hold		Swing		
Conservative hold		Swing		

=== Queenstown ===
Queenstown (3)
Party	Candidate	Votes	%	±%
Conservative	Derdre Church	1,793	44.2	
Conservative	Michael Todd	1,769		
Conservative	David Walden	1,666		
Labour	Bindu Joshi	1,362	33.5	
Labour	Olugbeminiyi Ijaola	1,346		
Labour	Daniel Lodge	1,336		
Green	Caroline Austin	586	14.4	
Independent	Brian Barnes	320	7.9	
Turnout			34.7	
Conservative hold		Swing		
Conservative hold		Swing		
Conservative hold		Swing		

=== Roehampton and Putney Heath ===
Roehampton and Putney Heath (3)
Party	Candidate	Votes	%	±%
Conservative	Scott Caisley	1,872	49.8	
Conservative	Penelope Bradford	1,811		
Conservative	Adrian Knowles	1,737		
Labour	Donald Roy	1,275	33.9	
Labour	Amanda Webster	1,196		
Labour	John Russell	1,186		
Liberal Democrats	Valerie Shelmerdine	322	8.6	
Green	Michael Turner	290	7.7	
Liberal Democrats	Hugh Brown	245		
Liberal Democrats	Godfrey Shocket	232		
Turnout			32.4	
Conservative hold		Swing		
Conservative hold		Swing		
Conservative hold		Swing		

=== Shaftesbury ===
Shaftesbury (3)
Party	Candidate	Votes	%	±%
Conservative	James Cousins	2,036	54.3	
Conservative	John Ellis	2,024		
Conservative	John Senior	1,883		
Labour	Essie Linton	811	21.6	
Labour	Geoffrey Boyd	742		
Labour	Aaron Quinn	672		
Green	Vincent Pollard	517	13.8	
Liberal Democrats	Jeremy Porter	388	10.3	
Liberal Democrats	Alef Rosenbaum	327		
Turnout			30.9	
Conservative hold		Swing		
Conservative hold		Swing		
Conservative hold		Swing		

=== Southfields ===
Southfields (3)
Party	Candidate	Votes	%	±%
Conservative	Jennifer Nickels	2,285	52.3	
Conservative	Lucy E. Allan	2,232		
Conservative	Paul Reeve	2,207		
Liberal Democrats	Anna Ahmed	867	19.9	
Liberal Democrats	Adam Towner	761		
Liberal Democrats	Anthony Burrett	690		
Labour	Josephine Simpson	680	15.6	
Labour	Trevor Smith	654		
Labour	Raskai Amole	617		
Green	Dorothy Horsler	460	10.5	
Independent	Edward Larkin	73	1.7	
Turnout			35.9	
Conservative hold		Swing		
Conservative hold		Swing		
Conservative hold		Swing		

=== St Mary's Park ===
St Mary's Park (3)
Party	Candidate	Votes	%	±%
Conservative	Mark Davies	2,048	56.5	
Conservative	Tessa Strickland	2,003		
Conservative	John Hallmark	2,000		
Labour	Edward Ainsworth	705	19.4	
Labour	Sally Gear	697		
Labour	Peter Taylor	696		
Green	Hugo Charlton	517	14.3	
Liberal Democrats	David McCullough	355	9.8	
Liberal Democrats	David Owen-Jones	353		
Turnout			30.1	
Conservative hold		Swing		
Conservative hold		Swing		
Conservative hold		Swing		

=== Thamesfield ===
Thamesfield (3)
Party	Candidate	Votes	%	±%
Conservative	Edward Lister	2,470	60.0	
Conservative	Rosemary Torrington	2,446		
Conservative	James Maddan	2,423		
Labour	Emily Robinson	595	14.5	
Labour	Christopher Locke	581		
Green	Monica Vickery	553	13.4	
Labour	Ewen Mitchell	546		
Liberal Democrats	Christopher Jefferey	498	12.1	
Liberal Democrats	Moira Sanders	447		
Liberal Democrats	Martha Zantides	391		
Turnout			34.9	
Conservative hold		Swing		
Conservative hold		Swing		
Conservative hold		Swing		

=== Tooting ===
Tooting (3)
Party	Candidate	Votes	%	±%
Conservative	Susan John-Richards	1,707	38.9	
Conservative	Alexander Jacob	1,682		
Labour	Nicholas Bowes	1,643	37.4	
Labour	Elisabeth Davies	1,616		
Conservative	Matthew Maxwell Scott	1,596		
Labour	Stuart King	1,560		
Green	Sarah Henderson	507	11.5	
Liberal Democrats	Michael Clifton	399	9.1	
Liberal Democrats	Jaya Patel	393		
Liberal Democrats	Christian Moon	368		
Communist	Philip Brand	136	3.1	
Turnout			37.0	
Conservative gain from Labour		Swing		
Conservative gain from Labour		Swing		
Labour hold		Swing		

=== Wandsworth Common ===
Wandsworth Common (3)
Party	Candidate	Votes	%	±%
Conservative	Katharine Tracey	2,657	59.9	
Conservative	Maurice Heaster	2,628		
Conservative	Henry Pugh	2,623		
Green	Albert Vickery	629	14.2	
Labour	Michael Dolan	625	14.1	
Labour	Anna Turley	553		
Liberal Democrats	David Patterson	524	11.8	
Labour	Mark Panto	496		
Turnout			37.6	
Conservative hold		Swing		
Conservative hold		Swing		
Conservative hold		Swing		

=== West Hill ===
West Hill (3)
Party	Candidate	Votes	%	±%
Conservative	Elizabeth Howlett	2,149	58.3	
Conservative	Nicholas Cuff	1,992		
Conservative	Malcolm Grimston	1,964		
Labour	Carol Anderton	677	18.4	
Labour	John Slater	568		
Labour	Alexander Guite	561		
Liberal Democrats	Catherine Devons	438	11.9	
Green	Tomasz Sokolowski	421	11.4	
Liberal Democrats	Laurence Spicer	319		
Liberal Democrats	Christopher Ward	285		
Turnout			30.1	
Conservative hold		Swing		
Conservative hold		Swing		
Conservative hold		Swing		

=== West Putney ===
West Putney (3)
Party	Candidate	Votes	%	±%
Conservative	Ruth Stokes	2,364	66.3	
Conservative	Jane Cooper	2,361		
Conservative	Andrew Penfold	2,317		
Labour	Maureen Booker	757	21.2	
Labour	Pauline Brueseke	650		
Labour	John Slinger	587		
Liberal Democrats	Susan Shocket	443	12.4	
Liberal Democrats	John Ryan	422		
Liberal Democrats	Robert Williams	373		
Turnout			34.5	
Conservative hold		Swing		
Conservative hold		Swing		
Conservative hold		Swing		
