= Roehampton (ward) =

Electoral ward in the London Borough of Wandsworth

- Electoral ward for the Wandsworth London Borough Council
- Borough: London Borough of Wandsworth
- County: Greater London
- Population: 18,846 (2021)
- Major settlements: Roehampton
- Area: 4.082 km²

Current electoral ward
- Created: 1965
- Seats: 3

Roehampton is an electoral ward in the London Borough of Wandsworth. The ward was first used in the 1964 elections and elects three councillors to Wandsworth London Borough Council. The ward was renamed Roehampton & Putney Heath in 2010.

== Geography ==
The ward is based on the suburb of Roehampton.

== Councillors ==
Election	Councillors		
2022	Jenny Yates (Labour)	Matthew Tiller (Labour)	Graeme Henderson (Labour)

== Elections ==
=== 2022 ===
Roehampton (3)
Party	Candidate	Votes	%
Labour	Jenny Yates	1,909	51.2
Labour	Matthew Tiller	1,865	50.0
Labour	Graeme Henderson	1,855	49.8
Conservative	Jane Cooper	1,247	33.4
Conservative	Ray Chapman	1,183	31.7
Conservative	Deen Ossman	1,154	31.0
Green	Terence Brown	357	9.6
Liberal Democrats	Henry Compson	351	9.4
Liberal Democrats	Ben Speedy	312	8.4
Green	Matthew Palmer	307	8.2
TUSC	Deji Olayinka	98	2.6
Turnout		3,728	33.6
Labour win (new seat)			
Labour win (new seat)			
Labour win (new seat)			

== See also ==
- List of electoral wards in Greater London
