= West Hill (ward) =

Electoral ward in the London Borough of Wandsworth

- Electoral ward for the Wandsworth London Borough Council
- Borough: London Borough of Wandsworth
- County: Greater London
- Population: 16,815 (2021)
- Major settlements: West Hill, Wandsworth
- Area: 1.689 km²

Current electoral ward
- Created: 1965
- Seats: 3

West Hill is an electoral ward in the London Borough of Wandsworth. The ward was first used in the 1964 elections and elects three councillors to Wandsworth London Borough Council.

== Geography ==
The ward is named after West Hill, Wandsworth.

== Councillors ==
Election	Councillors		
2022	Daniel Ghossain (Conservative)	Malcolm Grimston (Independent)	Angela Ireland (Labour)

== Elections ==
=== 2022 ===
West Hill (3)
Party	Candidate	Votes	%
Independent	Malcolm Grimston	3,689	66.4
Labour	Angela Ireland	2,221	40.0
Conservative	Daniel Ghossain	1,621	29.2
Conservative	Salvatore Murtas	1,620	29.1
Labour	Daniel Shearer	1,557	28.0
Labour	Flavio Ravara	1,529	27.5
Conservative	Terry Walsh	1,096	19.7
Green	Jason Whiffin	644	11.6
Liberal Democrats	Hugh Brown	305	5.5
Liberal Democrats	Douglas Downie	296	5.3
Liberal Democrats	Andrew Hinton	177	3.2
Turnout		5,558	48.9
Independent hold			
Labour hold			
Conservative gain from Labour			

== See also ==
- List of electoral wards in Greater London
