= Thamesfield (ward) =

Electoral ward in London, England

- Electoral ward for the Wandsworth London Borough Council
- Borough: London Borough of Wandsworth
- County: Greater London
- Population: 16,717 (2021)
- Area: 1.656 km²

Current electoral ward
- Created: 1965
- Seats: 3

Thamesfield is an electoral ward in the London Borough of Wandsworth. The ward was first used in the 1964 elections and elects three councillors to Wandsworth London Borough Council.

== Geography ==
The ward is based on the Thamesfield area.

== Councillors ==
Election	Councillors		
2022	Ethan Brooks (Conservative)	James Jeffreys (Conservative)	John Locker (Conservative)

== Elections ==
=== 2022 ===
Thamesfield (3)
Party	Candidate	Votes	%
Conservative	Ethan Brooks	2,292	43.0
Conservative	James Jeffreys	2,221	41.7
Conservative	John Locker	2,212	41.5
Labour	Chris Locke	1,768	33.2
Labour	Diana Robinson	1,763	33.1
Labour	Stephen Gibbons	1,762	33.1
Liberal Democrats	Paul Benton	744	14.0
Liberal Democrats	Becky Grubb	733	13.8
Liberal Democrats	Gabriel Barton-Singer	701	13.2
Green	Emma Killick	556	10.4
Green	Diana McCann	526	9.9
Green	Penny Staniaszek	377	7.1
Turnout		5,325	44.5
Conservative hold			
Conservative hold			
Conservative hold			

== See also ==
- List of electoral wards in Greater London
