= Furzedown (ward) =

Electoral ward in the London Borough of Wandsworth

- Electoral ward for the Wandsworth London Borough Council
- Borough: London Borough of Wandsworth
- County: Greater London
- Population: 18,053 (2021)
- Major settlements: Furzedown
- Area: 1.567 km²

Current electoral ward
- Created: 1965
- Seats: 3

Furzedown is an electoral ward in the London Borough of Wandsworth. The ward was first used in the 1964 elections and elects three councillors to Wandsworth London Borough Council.

== Geography ==
The ward is based on the suburb of Furzedown.

== Councillors ==
Election	Councillors		
2022	Leonie Cooper (Labour)	Katrina Ffrench (Labour)	Judi Gasser (Labour)

== Elections ==
=== 2022 ===
Furzedown (3)
Party	Candidate	Votes	%
Labour	Leonie Cooper	3,232	68.8
Labour	Katrina Ffrench	2,939	62.5
Labour	Judi Gasser	2,893	61.6
Conservative	Robert Broadhurst	973	20.7
Green	Shaun Collins	936	19.9
Conservative	Jonathan Iliff	936	19.9
Conservative	Thomas Mathers	935	19.9
Liberal Democrats	Andrew Bracken	322	6.9
Liberal Democrats	Clare Murray	288	6.1
Liberal Democrats	Sudi Piggot	177	3.8
Turnout		4,699	38.9
Labour hold			
Labour hold			
Labour hold			

== See also ==
- List of electoral wards in Greater London
