= 2018 Wandsworth London Borough Council election =

2018 local election in England

- 3 May 2018

All 60 seats to Wandsworth London Borough Council 31 seats needed for a majority

	First party	Second party
Party	Conservative	Labour
Last election	41 seats, 39.8%	19 seats, 32.2%
Seats won	33	26
Seat change	▼8	▲7
Popular vote	42,002	42,401
Percentage	38.3%	38.7%
Swing	▼1.5%	▲6.5%
- Results of the 2018 Wandsworth London Borough council election.
Council control before election
Conservative
Council control after election
Conservative

The 2018 Wandsworth Council election took place on 3 May 2018 to elect members of Wandsworth Council in London, England. This was on the same day as other local elections.

The Conservative Party retained control of the council with a reduced majority, although the Labour Party made 7 gains and won the popular vote across the borough by a narrow margin.

== Overall results ==
The Conservatives retained control of the council, winning 33 seats (down 8). Labour won 26 (up 7), while 1 seat was won by an independent, Malcolm Grimston.

Wandsworth local election result 2018
Party	Seats	Gains	Losses	Net gain/loss	Seats %	Votes %	Votes	+/−
Labour	26	7	0	+7	43.3	38.7	42,401	+6.5
Conservative	33	0	7	-7	55.0	38.3	42,002	-1.5
Liberal Democrats	0	0	0	0	0.0	8.5	9,339	+0.8
Green	0	0	0	0	0.0	7.9	8,684	-4.7
Independent	1	1	0	+1	1.7	3.7	4,002	+2.3
Renew	0	0	1	-1	0.0	2.3	2,474	New
UKIP	0	0	0	0	0.0	0.6	660	-5.1
Duma Polska	0	0	0	0	0.0	0.1	96	New
Democrats and Veterans	0	0	0	0	0.0	0.0	26	New

== Ward results ==
Balham (3)
Party	Candidate	Votes	%	±%
Conservative	Lucy Mowatt	2,495	47.8	−6.3
Conservative	Paul Ellis	2,458	47.1	−4.3
Conservative	Clare Salier	2,309	44.2	−7.4
Labour	Sue Watson	1,976	37.8	+9.5
Labour	Alex Wolfers	1,863	35.7	+8.1
Labour	Ben McGowan	1,802	34.5	+12.6
Renew	Chris Coghlan	568	10.9	N/A
Liberal Democrats	Christine Green	501	9.6	−0.9
Green	Dan Rad	465	8.9	−8.1
Liberal Democrats	Philip Carey	455	8.7	N/A
Liberal Democrats	Matthew Green	304	5.8	−3.5
Turnout		5,221	46.27	
Conservative hold		Swing		
Conservative hold		Swing		
Conservative hold		Swing		

Bedford (3)
Party	Candidate	Votes	%	±%
Labour	Fleur Anderson	2,835	54.8	+11.7
Labour	Clare Fraser	2,719	52.6	+11.6
Labour	Hector Wakefield	2,376	46.0	+7.8
Conservative	Pippa Smith	1,955	37.8	−4.4
Conservative	Thom Norman	1,889	36.5	−4.2
Conservative	Shaun Wright	1,794	34.7	−5.9
Green	Albert Vickery	525	10.2	−4.8
Liberal Democrats	David Lane	354	6.8	+0.4
Liberal Democrats	Mark Robinson	317	6.1	N/A
Liberal Democrats	William Woodward	295	5.7	−1.6
Turnout		5,169	46.09	
Labour hold		Swing		
Labour hold		Swing		
Labour gain from Conservative		Swing		

Earlsfield (3)
Party	Candidate	Votes	%	±%
Labour	Joanne Rigby	2,664	45.8	+6.6
Labour	Graeme Henderson	2,642	45.4	+7.6
Conservative	Angela Graham	2,595	44.6	−0.6
Labour	Alan McDonald	2,585	44.4	+9.5
Conservative	Lewis Preston	2,314	39.8	−3.8
Conservative	James Jeffreys	2,309	39.7	+1.8
Green	Glyn Goodwin	470	8.1	−6.8
Green	Vanessa Mieville	385	6.6	N/A
Liberal Democrats	Paul Edgeworth	335	5.8	−1.5
Liberal Democrats	David Chapireau	309	5.3	−1.6
Liberal Democrats	Russell Henley	273	4.7	N/A
Turnout		5,821	49.30	
Labour hold		Swing		
Labour gain from Conservative		Swing		
Conservative hold		Swing		

East Putney (3)
Party	Candidate	Votes	%	±%
Conservative	Sarah Binder	2,627	53.6	+0.7
Conservative	George Crivelli	2,503	51.1	−1.1
Conservative	Ravi Govindia	2,418	49.4	−0.5
Labour	Finna Ayres	1,296	26.5	+4.6
Labour	Eileen Flanagan	1,232	25.2	+0.6
Labour	Hugh Samuel	1,098	22.4	+2.3
Liberal Democrats	Jose Rodriguez Andres	795	16.2	+4.5
Liberal Democrats	John Williams	743	15.2	+6.1
Liberal Democrats	Timothy Williams	633	12.9	+3.5
Green	Anita Gray	389	7.9	N/A
Green	Jonathan Croall	324	6.6	N/A
Green	Richard Morris	240	4.9	−10.2
Turnout		4,897	41.06	
Conservative hold		Swing		
Conservative hold		Swing		
Conservative hold		Swing		

Fairfield (3)
Party	Candidate	Votes	%	±%
Conservative	Piers McCausland	2,235	50.9	−2.5
Conservative	William Sweet	2,172	49.5	−3.5
Conservative	Rory O'Broin	2,154	49.1	+0.5
Labour	Juliana Annan	1,430	32.6	+4.3
Labour	Lynne Jackson	1,414	32.2	+5.6
Labour	Ian Jewesbury	1,351	30.8	+5.1
Green	David Carlyon	533	12.1	−4.5
Liberal Democrats	David Patterson	443	10.1	N/A
Liberal Democrats	Patrick Warren	355	8.1	−2.3
Renew	George Hilton	321	7.3	N/A
Liberal Democrats	Paul Scaping	316	7.2	−1.8
Turnout		4,387	39.74	
Conservative hold		Swing		
Conservative hold		Swing		
Conservative hold		Swing		

Furzedown (3)
Party	Candidate	Votes	%	±%
Labour	Leonie Cooper	3,488	68.7	+6.1
Labour	Judith Gasser	3,371	66.4	+9.3
Labour	Candida Jones	3,254	64.1	+6.6
Conservative	Claire Clay	1,174	23.1	+0.8
Conservative	Robert Broadhurst	1,167	23.0	+2.1
Conservative	Nabi Toktas	982	19.4	−0.6
Green	Gerard Harrison	526	10.4	−0.3
Liberal Democrats	Raaid Casoojee	292	5.8	+0.7
Liberal Democrats	John Pindar	197	3.9	N/A
Liberal Democrats	Gary Wilson	190	3.7	N/A
Turnout		5,074	45.40	
Labour hold		Swing		
Labour hold		Swing		
Labour hold		Swing		

Graveney (3)
Party	Candidate	Votes	%	±%
Labour	Kemi Akinola	3,025	68.1	+8.8
Labour	Kate Forbes	2,982	67.1	+10.6
Labour	Andrew Gibbons	2,894	65.2	+5.0
Conservative	Miles Bassett	950	21.4	−0.6
Conservative	Antonia Dunn	939	21.1	+2.8
Conservative	Toby Williams	938	21.1	+3.2
Green	Esther Obiri-Darko	491	11.1	−3.1
Liberal Democrats	Stephen Bieniek	188	4.2	−3.8
Liberal Democrats	Giles Derrington	184	4.1	−3.0
Liberal Democrats	Colin Hamilton-Williams	126	2.8	−2.7
Duma Polska	Dorota Zalewska-Kinash	96	2.2	N/A
Turnout		4,442	40.00	
Labour hold		Swing		
Labour hold		Swing		
Labour hold		Swing		

Latchmere (3)
Party	Candidate	Votes	%	±%
Labour	Tony Belton	2,587	62.5	+7.8
Labour	Kate Stock	2,519	60.9	+12.2
Labour	Simon Hogg	2,442	59.0	+11.2
Conservative	Robert Carington	994	24.0	−6.7
Conservative	Alex Stewart-Clark	913	22.1	−8.2
Conservative	Joseph Ridout	890	21.5	−6.1
Green	Sheaian Lee	349	8.4	−4.4
Liberal Democrats	Jonathan Alexander	257	6.2	+0.6
Liberal Democrats	Mark Bennett	231	5.6	+0.2
Liberal Democrats	Philip Walder	218	5.3	N/A
Independent	Alex McHugh	148	3.6	N/A
Renew	Caroline Poeschl	99	2.4	N/A
UKIP	Eugene Power	71	1.7	−6.5
UKIP	Charles Skeffington	71	1.7	N/A
Democrats and Veterans	Ruth Price	26	0.6	N/A
Turnout		4,136	37.03	
Labour hold		Swing		
Labour hold		Swing		
Labour hold		Swing		

Nightingale (3)
Party	Candidate	Votes	%	±%
Conservative	Sarah McDermott	2,535	44.9	−6.4
Conservative	Richard Field	2,461	43.6	−6.1
Conservative	Ian Hart	2,383	42.2	−5.7
Labour	Rebecca Wilson	2,321	41.1	+12.4
Labour	Henry Fowler	2,186	38.7	+11.2
Labour	Colm O'Flynn	2,158	38.2	+12.6
Liberal Democrats	Olly Glover	607	10.8	+0.1
Liberal Democrats	Sabrina-Provence Maydew	560	9.9	+3.9
Green	Patrick Ellen	499	8.8	−8.4
Liberal Democrats	Jon Irwin	477	8.4	N/A
Renew	James Blair	134	2.4	N/A
UKIP	Strachan McDonald	47	0.8	−4.4
Turnout		5,645	49.33	
Conservative hold		Swing		
Conservative hold		Swing		
Conservative hold		Swing		

Northcote (3)
Party	Candidate	Votes	%	±%
Conservative	Peter Dawson	2,516	56.6	−3.3
Conservative	Louise Nathanson	2,389	53.7	−6.5
Conservative	Aled Richards-Jones	2,323	52.2	−2.1
Labour	Amy Merrigan	1,168	26.3	+2.0
Labour	Chloe Ingram	1,097	24.7	+2.7
Labour	Tom Hymas	982	22.1	+1.3
Liberal Democrats	David Linden	880	19.8	+9.2
Liberal Democrats	Muriel Cronin	588	13.2	+3.5
Green	Caroline Austin	545	12.3	−4.7
Renew	Jane Hilton	458	10.3	N/A
Liberal Democrats	Daniel Jayson	417	9.4	N/A
Turnout		4,448	42.74	
Conservative hold		Swing		
Conservative hold		Swing		
Conservative hold		Swing		

Queenstown (3)
Party	Candidate	Votes	%	±%
Labour	Aydin Dikerdem	2,637	53.0	+12.4
Labour	Paula Walker	2,425	48.8	+10.2
Labour	Maurice McLeod	2,366	47.6	+9.4
Conservative	Matthew Corner	1,734	34.9	−6.2
Conservative	Marie Hanson	1,712	34.4	−5.2
Conservative	Justin Taylor	1,699	34.2	−4.7
Green	Stella Baker	384	7.7	−1.6
Liberal Democrats	Florence Mele	365	7.3	+1.8
Liberal Democrats	Mark Gitsham	335	6.7	+3.2
Liberal Democrats	Jordi Lage	293	5.9	N/A
Green	Frankleroy Stuart	246	4.9	−4.0
Renew	Daria Hass	134	2.7	N/A
Turnout				
Labour hold		Swing		
Labour gain from Conservative		Swing		
Labour gain from Conservative		Swing		

Roehampton & Putney Heath (3)
Party	Candidate	Votes	%	±%
Labour	Jeremy Ambache	1,806	51.4	+2.9
Labour	Sue McKinney	1,797	51.1	±0.0
Labour	Claire Gilbert	1,724	49.0	+0.4
Conservative	Mohammad Masood	1,249	35.5	−1.5
Conservative	Kyle Knight	1,231	35.0	+1.2
Conservative	Dan Lynch	1,197	34.1	+0.7
Green	Fergal McEntee	319	9.1	−0.8
Liberal Democrats	Helen Speedy	250	7.1	+2.7
Liberal Democrats	Hugh Brown	226	6.4	+2.3
Liberal Democrats	Ben Speedy	208	5.9	+2.9
Turnout		3,515	36.10	
Labour hold		Swing		
Labour hold		Swing		
Labour hold		Swing		

Shaftesbury (3)
Party	Candidate	Votes	%	±%
Conservative	Dr Hugh Byrne	2,131	46.2	−5.9
Conservative	Jonathan Cook	2,085	45.2	−4.7
Conservative	John Senior	1,934	41.9	−6.5
Labour	Samantha Heath	1,899	41.1	+8.0
Labour	Sara Linton	1,892	41.0	+11.8
Labour	Mohammad Zaheer	1,565	33.9	+6.1
Renew	James Cousins	499	10.8	N/A
Green	James Frew	460	10.0	−6.3
Liberal Democrats	Richard Davis	410	8.9	−1.6
Liberal Democrats	Alexander Harlow	277	6.0	N/A
Liberal Democrats	Simon Shields	267	5.8	N/A
Turnout		4,616	42.51	
Conservative hold		Swing		
Conservative hold		Swing		
Conservative gain from Renew		Swing		

Southfields (3)
Party	Candidate	Votes	%	±%
Conservative	Kim Caddy	2,981	47.2	+1.5
Conservative	Guy Humphries	2,912	46.1	+0.6
Conservative	Terry Walsh	2,888	45.7	+2.6
Labour	Sheila Boswell	2,338	37.0	+9.3
Labour	Guy Griffith	2,155	34.1	+7.7
Labour	Sam Nicholas	2,137	33.8	+8.9
Liberal Democrats	Sue Wixley	716	11.3	+2.2
Liberal Democrats	Pat Durai-Bates	696	11.0	+2.2
Liberal Democrats	Duncan Lyons	643	10.2	+4.2
Green	Ben Fletcher	462	7.3	−8.0
Green	Lauren Harris	402	6.4	N/A
Renew	Nicky Frost	94	1.5	N/A
UKIP	Patricia Ward	80	1.3	N/A
Turnout		6,315	48.89	
Conservative hold		Swing		
Conservative hold		Swing		
Conservative hold		Swing		

St Mary's Park (3)
Party	Candidate	Votes	%	±%
Conservative	Melanie Hampton	2,602	45.3	−5.8
Conservative	Rhodri Morgan	2,498	43.5	−4.5
Labour	Emily Wintle	2,495	43.5	+11.8
Conservative	Charles Pitt	2,484	43.3	−3.9
Labour	Matt Valentine	2,468	43.0	+13.5
Labour	Steve Worrall	2,162	37.7	+10.3
Green	Lois Davis	561	9.8	−6.9
Liberal Democrats	Sian Hughes Kroon	380	6.6	−2.0
Liberal Democrats	Robert Anderson	314	5.5	N/A
Liberal Democrats	Michael Leitch	308	5.4	N/A
Renew	David Britten	267	4.7	N/A
Turnout		5,740	43.62	
Conservative hold		Swing		
Conservative hold		Swing		
Labour gain from Conservative		Swing		

Thamesfield (3)
Party	Candidate	Votes	%	±%
Conservative	Rosemary Torrington	2,697	51.6	−5.5
Conservative	John Ryder	2,618	50.1	−4.5
Conservative	John Locker	2,492	47.7	−6.2
Labour	Sally Warren	1,103	21.1	±0.0
Labour	Stephen Gibbons	1,019	19.5	±0.0
Labour	Chris Locke	1,011	19.3	+1.8
Liberal Democrats	Paul Benton	975	18.6	+6.3
Liberal Democrats	Ryan Mercer	929	17.8	+7.2
Liberal Democrats	James Keep	887	17.0	+8.2
Green	Diana McAnn	739	14.1	−4.6
Green	Richard Carter	468	9.0	N/A
Green	Ann Pasola	430	8.2	N/A
Turnout				
Conservative hold		Swing		
Conservative hold		Swing		
Conservative hold		Swing		

Tooting (3)
Party	Candidate	Votes	%	±%
Labour	Annamarie Critchard	3,106	68.1	+18.4
Labour	James Daly	2,917	64.6	+15.0
Labour	Paul White	2,694	59.1	+11.9
Conservative	Louise Mason-Rutherford	1,150	25.2	−6.3
Conservative	Ed Gibbs	1,118	24.5	−5.8
Conservative	Andrew Zwain	1,017	22.3	−6.1
Green	Liam Bailey-Morgan	511	11.2	−1.2
Liberal Democrats	Vijay Thumar	256	5.6	−1.6
Liberal Democrats	John Lee	232	5.1	−1.4
Liberal Democrats	Daniel Morse	202	4.4	−1.3
Turnout		4,560	39.12	
Labour hold		Swing		
Labour hold		Swing		
Labour hold		Swing		

Wandsworth Common (3)
Party	Candidate	Votes	%	±%
Conservative	Rosemary Birchall	3,124	64.4	+2.1
Conservative	Peter Graham	2,932	60.4	+3.0
Conservative	Adrian Flook	2,903	59.8	+4.4
Labour	Peter Blowes	1,206	24.8	+2.8
Labour	Marium Irfan	1,206	24.8	+3.2
Labour	Matty Tong	1,074	22.1	+1.1
Liberal Democrats	Eileen Arms	491	10.1	+0.4
Green	Simon Hudd	457	9.4	−4.4
Liberal Democrats	Caroline Ogden	409	8.4	N/A
Liberal Democrats	Simon Sharich	268	5.5	N/A
Turnout		4,854	47.61	
Conservative hold		Swing		
Conservative hold		Swing		
Conservative hold		Swing		

West Hill (3)
Party	Candidate	Votes	%	±%
Independent	Malcolm Grimston	4,002	66.7	+25.2
Labour	Angela Ireland	1,850	30.8	−0.6
Labour	Peter Carpenter	1,657	27.6	−3.6
Conservative	Alison Rodwell	1,626	27.1	−20.1
Labour	Nobuco Hara	1,606	26.8	−1.0
Conservative	Salvatore Murtas	1,363	22.7	−18.8
Conservative	Robert Hughes	1,265	21.1	−18.9
Green	Terry Brown	448	7.5	−6.3
Green	Penny Staniaszek	364	6.1	N/A
Liberal Democrats	Mary Doody	264	4.4	−7.1
Liberal Democrats	Andrew Hinton	250	4.2	−3.1
Liberal Democrats	Maria Joy	249	4.2	−1.4
Turnout		6,000	51.08	
Independent gain from Conservative		Swing		
Labour gain from Conservative		Swing		
Labour gain from Conservative		Swing		

Malcolm Grimston was elected in 2014 as a Conservative, before becoming an independent. Changes are shown from the 2014 election.

West Putney (3)
Party	Candidate	Votes	%	±%
Conservative	Jane Cooper	2,684	54.4	−2.2
Conservative	Ian Lewer	2,604	52.8	+0.6
Conservative	Steffi Sutters	2,584	52.4	+0.6
Labour	Yasin Inan	1,419	28.8	+3.9
Labour	Jim McKinney	1,405	28.5	+9.2
Labour	Susan Olech	1,304	26.4	+7.4
Liberal Democrats	Helen Compson	580	11.8	+1.3
Liberal Democrats	Charles Gillbe	458	9.3	+0.3
Liberal Democrats	Sharon Davis	419	8.5	+1.6
Green	Emma Killick	369	7.5	−3.9
Green	Jennifer Pang	342	6.9	N/A
Green	Christopher Poole	266	5.4	−5.9
Turnout		4,931	43.97	
Conservative hold		Swing		
Conservative hold		Swing		
Conservative hold		Swing		

== 2018–2022 by-elections ==
Furzedown by-election 21 June 2019
Party	Candidate	Votes	%	±%
Labour	Graham Loveland	1,811	49.0	▼14.7
Liberal Democrats	Jon Irwin	887	24.0	▲18.7
Conservative	Nabi Toktas	681	18.4	▼3.0
Green	Gerard Harrison	318	8.6	▼1.0
Majority		924	25.0	
Turnout		3,697		
Labour hold		Swing		

Bedford by-election 6 May 2021
Party	Candidate	Votes	%	±%
Labour	Hannah Stanislaus	2,714	48.3	▼1.7
Conservative	Tom Mytton	1,778	31.7	▼2.8
Green	David Carlyon	815	14.5	▲5.2
Liberal Democrats	Reeten Banerji	318	5.5	▼0.7
Majority		936	16.6	
Turnout		6,243	51.4	
Labour hold		Swing		

Bedford by-election 25 November 2021
Party	Candidate	Votes	%	±%
Labour	Sheila Boswell	906	40.2	▼8.1
Conservative	Tom Mytton	905	40.2	▲8.5
Green	Roy Vickery	306	13.6	▼0.9
Liberal Democrats	Paul Tibbles	135	6.0	▲0.5
Majority		1	0.0	
Turnout		2,252	21.7	
Labour hold		Swing		
