= East Putney (ward) =

Electoral ward in the London Borough of Wandsworth

- Electoral ward for the Wandsworth London Borough Council
- Borough: London Borough of Wandsworth
- County: Greater London
- Population: 16,918 (2021)
- Major settlements: East Putney
- Area: 1.709 km²

Current electoral ward
- Created: 1978
- Seats: 3

East Putney is an electoral ward in the London Borough of Wandsworth. The ward was first used in the 1978 elections and elects three councillors to Wandsworth London Borough Council.

== Geography ==
The ward is based on the eastern areas of Putney.

== Councillors ==
Election	Councillors		
2026	Jasmin Glynne (Labour)	George Crivelli (Conservative)	Ravi Govindia (Conservative)
2022	Ravi Govindia (Conservative)	Finna Ayres (Labour)	George Crivelli (Conservative)

== Elections ==
=== 2026 ===
2026 Wandsworth London Borough Council election: East Putney
Party	Candidate	Votes	%
Labour	Jasmin Glynne	2,348	12
Conservative	George Crivelli	2,299	12
Conservative	Ravi Govindia	2,257	12
Conservative	Deen Ossman	2,237	12
Labour	Dermot Neligan	2,076	11
Labour	Joe Smallman	1,961	10
Green	Maisie Jenkinson	1,030	5
Green	Hana Manthorpe	933	5
Green	Shanaj Begum	927	5
Reform	Jessica Anderson	565	3
Liberal Democrats	Rebecca Barton-Singer	529	3
Liberal Democrats	Nicki Breeze	514	3
Liberal Democrats	Gabriel Barton-Singer	487	3
Reform	Susan Muncey	453	2
Reform	Ali Bath	427	2
Turnout		19,043	52.93
Labour hold			
Conservative hold			
Conservative hold			

=== 2022 ===
2022 Wandsworth London Borough Council election: East Putney
Party	Candidate	Votes	%
Conservative	Ravi Govindia	2,179	43.1
Labour	Finna Ayres	2,147	42.4
Conservative	George Crivelli	2,144	42.4
Conservative	Michael Stephens	2,047	40.5
Labour	Eileen Flanagan	1,907	37.7
Labour	Susan Olech	1,727	34.1
Green	Graham Cooper	702	13.9
Liberal Democrats	Eleanor Doody	672	13.3
Green	Clive Price	440	8.7
Liberal Democrats	John Williams	396	7.8
Liberal Democrats	Mark Lejman	391	7.7
Turnout		5,059	41.3
Conservative hold			
Labour gain from Conservative			
Conservative hold			

== See also ==
- List of electoral wards in Greater London
