= Battersea (UK Parliament constituency) =

UK Parliament constituency (since 1983)

- Borough constituency for the House of Commons
- Interactive map of boundaries from 2024
- Location within Greater London
- County: Greater London
- Population: 110,400 (2022)
- Electorate: 71,949 (March 2020)
- Borough: Wandsworth

Current constituency
- Created: 1983
- Member of Parliament: Marsha de Cordova (Labour)
- Seats: One
- Created from: Battersea North and Battersea South

1885–1918
- Seats: One
- Type of constituency: Borough constituency
- Created from: Mid Surrey
- Replaced by: Battersea North and Battersea South

Battersea is a constituency (Note: A borough constituency (for the purposes of election expenses and type of returning officer).) in Greater London represented in the House of Commons of the UK Parliament since 2017 by Marsha de Cordova of the Labour Party. (Note: As with all constituencies, the constituency elects one Member of Parliament (MP) by the first past the post system of election at least every five years.)

The seat has had two periods of existence (1885–1918 and 1983 to date). In the first Parliament after the seat's re-creation it was Labour-represented, bucking the national result, thereafter from 1987 until 2017 the affiliation of the winning candidate was that of the winning party nationally – a 30-year bellwether.

In the 2016 referendum to leave the European Union, the constituency voted to remain by an estimated 77%, the highest by a constituency with a Conservative Member of Parliament (MP) at the time.

== Constituency profile ==
The Battersea constituency is a largely residential inner-city area of south London and covers the north-eastern part of the Borough of Wandsworth. It contains the districts of Battersea and Nine Elms and stretches south to include parts of Balham.

Battersea is a railway hub and contains Clapham Junction, the busiest railway interchange in the country. Residents of the constituency are, on average, younger and wealthier than the rest of London, and considerably more so than the rest of the country. The average house price is almost three times the national average, and residents of Battersea are far more likely to be degree-educated and work in professional jobs than the rest of the United Kingdom. The constituency is more ethnically diverse than the national average, but less so than the rest of London; 68% of residents are White, 12% are Black and 9% are Asian.

At the most recent borough council election in 2022, voters in central Battersea elected Labour Party councillors, whilst Nine Elms and the areas south of Clapham Junction were won by Conservatives. The constituency voted overwhelmingly to remain in the European Union in the 2016 referendum, with an estimated 77% of voters opposing Brexit. This makes Battersea one of the top 15 remain-supporting constituencies out of 650 in the country.

== Boundaries ==
=== Historic ===
1885–1918: Wards 2 and 3 of Battersea Parish, and that part of No. 4 Ward bounded on the south by Battersea Rise, and on the east by St John's Road.

1983–2010: The London Borough of Wandsworth wards of Balham, Fairfield, Latchmere, Northcote, Queenstown, St John, St Mary's Park and Shaftesbury.

St John Ward was abolished for the 2002 Wandsworth elections. St John was thus not in use at the next general election in 2005.

For that general election, the seat included a small part of Wandsworth Town (the majority being in Tooting constituency) and most of Fairfield (a small part being in Putney).

2010–2024: The London Borough of Wandsworth wards of Balham, Fairfield, Latchmere, Northcote, Queenstown, St Mary's Park and Shaftesbury.

=== Current ===
Following to the 2023 review of Westminster constituencies, which was based on the ward boundaries in place at 1 December 2020, the composition of the constituency from the 2024 general election was reduced to bring it in within the permitted electoral range by transferring the majority of the Fairfield ward (polling districts FFA, FFB and FFC - incorporating Wandsworth town centre) to Putney. Polling district FFD was retained.

Following a local government boundary review which came into effect in May 2022, the Fairfield ward was largely replaced by the Wandsworth Town ward. The constituency now comprises the following wards of the London Borough of Wandsworth from the 2024 general election:

- Balham (majority); Battersea Park; Falconbrook; Lavender; Nine Elms; Northcote; Shaftesbury & Queenstown; St Mary's (most); Wandsworth Town (part).

The seat covers the north-eastern third of the London Borough of Wandsworth. As drawn and redrawn since 1983, it includes central Wandsworth and in the same way as Chelsea on the opposite bank, it adjoins the Thames before it flows through central London.

It takes in all of the district of Battersea, including its large Battersea Park (which hosts frequent live entertainment events and seasonal festivals), riverside and London Heliport, and stretches eastwards to include Nine Elms. Surrounding Battersea Park, it includes Queenstown, large neighbourhoods of Battersea Town, (Note: Queenstown Road Battersea is passed through by the South West Main Line. Nine Elms constitutes a large 2010s mixed use neighbourhood including the landmark converted Battersea Power Station by the River Thames. The United States Embassy is part of the redevelopment.) and, going westwards, it includes most of Wandsworth town, including the riverside, Town Hall and East Hill. (Note: Specifically: "Fairfield" Ward, Wandsworth) Battersea also stretches south between Wandsworth Common and Clapham Common to include Balham Ward and the eastern end of Balham (the west, for general elections, being placed since 1983 in Tooting).

== History ==
=== Major events ===
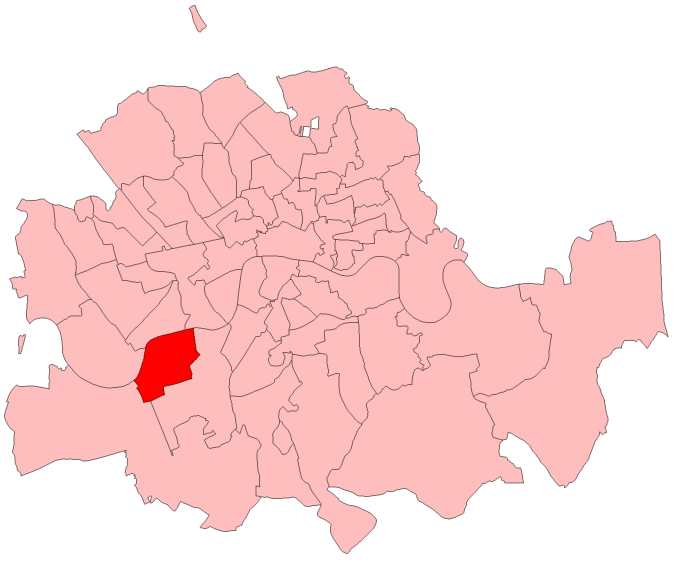
Battersea in the Metropolitan Board of Works area, showing "Borough of Battersea" boundaries used from 1885 to 1918 of Battersea itself

The Redistribution of Seats Act 1885 provided that the Constituency was to consist of-

- "No. 2 Ward of Battersea Parish,
- No. 3 Ward of Battersea Parish, and
- So much of No. 4 Ward of Battersea Parish as lies to the north of a line drawn along the centre of Battersea Rise, and to the west of a line drawn along the centre of the St. John's Road."

Battersea constituency was originally created in 1885. From 1892 to 1918 the seat was held by trade union leader John Burns who served as a Minister (of the Crown) in the Liberal Cabinets of Sir Henry Campbell-Bannerman and H. H. Asquith from 1905 until 1914.

The constituency was split in 1918 into:

- Battersea North, which included the cheap housing accompanying Battersea Power Station and railway-works focused Nine Elms; it saw gradual replacement in its lifespan to overcrowded terraces, and had only four years of a Conservative MP (from 1931), gradually becoming a very safe Labour seat from 1935 until 1979.
- Battersea South had average-middle income and few pockets of slum clearance, and was far more marginal than its northern counterpart. It saw 38 years of a Conservative MP, lastly from 1959 to 1964, without electing one during new latter-day Conservative governments which came to power in 1970 and 1979, held by the Labour Party, though mostly by narrow majorities.

The two seats have been rejoined since 1983, such that some areas of Battersea South became part of the adjoining Tooting seat. Alf Dubs (Labour), before the election the incumbent for Battersea South, won Battersea in 1983. Conservative John Bowis won in the next elections, 1987 and 1992. Martin Linton, a Labour politician, took it back in 1997 and held the seat until 2010, when it was recaptured by the Conservatives' Jane Ellison. The constituency's bellwether status was broken in 2017 when Marsha de Cordova won for Labour. She retained the seat in 2019 and again in 2024, when she achieved a records majority of 25.6%.

=== Minor events ===
In 2001, the candidate T.E Barber used the candidate description "No fruit out of context party", and advocated the end of, amongst other crimes against food, pineapples on pizza.

In the book Things Can Only Get Better: Eighteen Miserable Years in the Life of a Labour Supporter, John O'Farrell describes his experiences of being the secretary of Queenstown Branch of the Battersea Labour party, during which time the branch suffered a net loss at every local election and, in 1987, lost their MP, Alf Dubs.

Benefiting from an exclusivity arrangement, the old Battersea North was one of two seats in London to have had a Communist MP: Shapurji Saklatvala represented the area from 1922 to 1929. A wealthy aristocratic Indian, he was among the five Communists elected to the national chamber in its history and was the third of the young Socialist Labour/Communist/Labour parties from an ethnic minority background. At first, Saklatvala had local Labour party support and was also a member of that party but then stood as a Communist in 1924 with local Labour party backing. The head office of the less radical Labour party mandated an official Labour candidate stand against him in 1929. The Battersea Labour Club (a drinking club not directly connected with the political party) had a notice on its notice board up until the 1980s banning Communists from admission to the club.

== Members of Parliament ==
First elected	Member	Party
1885	Octavius Vaughan Morgan	Liberal
1892	John Burns	Independent Labour
1895 (new party)	John Burns	Liberal-Labour
see Battersea North and Battersea South for 1918–1983
1983	Alf Dubs	Labour
1987	John Bowis	Conservative
1997	Martin Linton	Labour
2010	Jane Ellison	Conservative
2017	Marsha de Cordova	Labour

== Elections ==
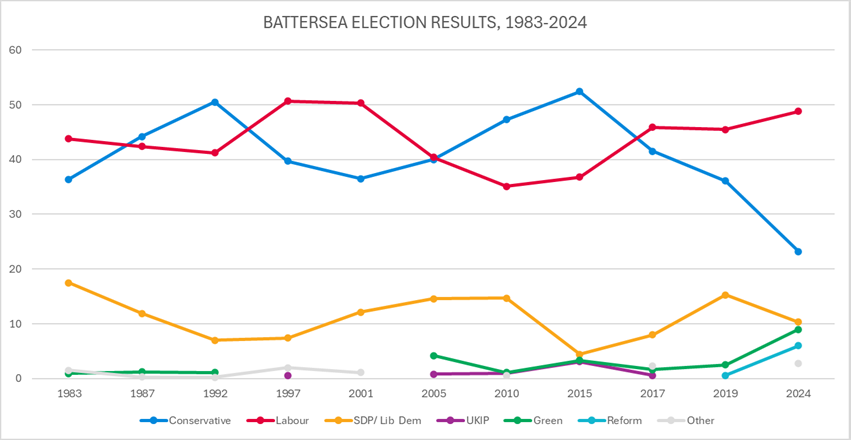
Election results 1983-2024

=== Elections in the 2020s ===
General election 2024: Battersea
Party	Candidate	Votes	%	±%
Labour	Marsha de Cordova	22,983	48.8	▲2.4
Conservative	Tom Pridham	10,944	23.2	▼12.2
Liberal Democrats	Francis Chubb	4,826	10.3	▼4.8
Green	Joe Taylor	4,239	9.0	▲6.5
Reform	Barry Edwards	2,825	6.0	▲5.4
Workers Party	Daniel Smith	499	1.1	new
Rejoin EU	Georgina Burford-Connole	401	0.9	new
Independent	Jake Thomas	216	0.5	new
SDP	Ed Dampier	149	0.3	new
Majority		12,039	25.6	▲14.6
Turnout		47,082	64.7	▼11.6
Registered electors		72,767		
Labour hold		Swing	▲7.3	

=== Elections in the 2010s ===
2019 notional result (Note: Estimate of the 2019 general election result as if the revised boundaries recommended under the 2023 boundary review were in place)
Party	Vote	%
Labour	25,457	46.4
Conservative	19,431	35.4
Liberal Democrats	8,316	15.1
Green	1,364	2.5
Brexit Party	350	0.6
Majority	6,026	11.0
Turnout	54,918	76.3
Electorate	71,949	

General election 2019: Battersea
Party	Candidate	Votes	%	±%
Labour	Marsha de Cordova	27,290	45.5	▼0.4
Conservative	Kim Caddy	21,622	36.1	▼5.4
Liberal Democrats	Mark Gitsham	9,150	15.3	▲7.3
Green	Lois Davis	1,529	2.5	▲0.9
Brexit Party	Jake Thomas	386	0.6	New
Majority		5,668	9.5	▲5.0
Turnout		59,977	75.6	▲4.6
Registered electors		79,309		
Labour hold		Swing	▲2.5	

General election 2017: Battersea
Party	Candidate	Votes	%	±%
Labour	Marsha de Cordova	25,292	45.9	+9.1
Conservative	Jane Ellison	22,876	41.5	−10.9
Liberal Democrats	Richard Davis	4,401	8.0	+3.6
Independent	Chris Coghlan	1,234	2.2	New
Green	Lois Davis	866	1.6	−1.7
UKIP	Eugene Power	357	0.6	−2.5
Socialist (GB)	Daniel Lambert	32	0.1	New
Majority		2,416	4.4	N/A
Turnout		55,058	71.0	+4.0
Registered electors		77,574		
Labour gain from Conservative		Swing	+10.0	

General election 2015: Battersea
Party	Candidate	Votes	%	±%
Conservative	Jane Ellison	26,730	52.4	+5.1
Labour	Will Martindale	18,792	36.8	+1.7
Liberal Democrats	Luke Taylor	2,241	4.4	−10.3
Green	Joe Stuart	1,682	3.3	+2.2
UKIP	Christopher Howe	1,586	3.1	+2.1
Majority		7,938	15.6	+3.4
Turnout		51,031	67.0	+1.3
Registered electors		76,111		
Conservative hold		Swing	+1.6	

General election 2010: Battersea
Party	Candidate	Votes	%	±%
Conservative	Jane Ellison	23,103	47.3	+7.3
Labour	Martin Linton	17,126	35.1	−4.1
Liberal Democrats	Layla Moran	7,176	14.7	−0.1
Green	Guy Evans	559	1.1	−3.1
UKIP	Christopher MacDonald	505	1.0	+0.2
Hugh Salmon for Battersea Party	Hugh Salmon	168	0.3	New
Independent	Tom Fox	155	0.3	New
Majority		5,977	12.2	N/A
Turnout		48,792	65.7	+6.5
Registered electors		74,311		
Conservative gain from Labour		Swing	+6.5	

=== Elections in the 2000s ===
General election 2005: Battersea
Party	Candidate	Votes	%	±%
Labour	Martin Linton	16,569	40.4	−9.9
Conservative	Dominic Schofield	16,406	40.0	+3.5
Liberal Democrats	Norsheen Bhatti	6,006	14.6	+2.5
Green	Hugo Charlton	1,735	4.2	New
UKIP	Terry Jones	333	0.8	New
Majority		163	0.4	−13.3
Turnout		41,049	59.0	+4.5
Registered electors		69,548		
Labour hold		Swing	−6.7	

General election 2001: Battersea
Party	Candidate	Votes	%	±%
Labour	Martin Linton	18,498	50.3	−0.4
Conservative	Lucy Shersby	13,445	36.5	−2.9
Liberal Democrats	Siobhan Vitelli	4,450	12.1	+4.7
Independent	Thomas Barber	411	1.1	New
Majority		5,053	13.8	+2.5
Turnout		36,804	54.5	−16.3
Registered electors		67,495		
Labour hold		Swing	+2.1	

=== Elections in the 1990s ===
General election 1997: Battersea
Party	Candidate	Votes	%	±%
Labour	Martin Linton	24,047	50.7	+9.5
Conservative	John Bowis	18,687	39.4	−11.1
Liberal Democrats	Paula Keaveney	3,482	7.4	+0.4
Referendum	Mark Slater	804	1.7	New
UKIP	Ashley Banks	250	0.5	New
Rainbow Dream Ticket	Joseph Marshall	127	0.3	New
Majority		5,360	11.3	N/A
Turnout		47,397	70.8	−5.8
Registered electors		66,895		
Labour gain from Conservative		Swing	+10.2	

General election 1992: Battersea
Party	Candidate	Votes	%	±%
Conservative	John Bowis	26,390	50.5	+6.3
Labour	Alf Dubs	21,550	41.2	−1.2
Liberal Democrats	Roger O'Brien	3,659	7.0	−4.9
Green	Ian Wingrove	584	1.1	−0.1
Natural Law	William Stevens	98	0.2	New
Majority		4,840	9.3	+7.5
Turnout		52,281	76.6	+5.9
Registered electors		68,218		
Conservative hold		Swing	+3.7	

=== Elections in the 1980s ===
General election 1987: Battersea
Party	Candidate	Votes	%	±%
Conservative	John Bowis	20,945	44.2	+7.8
Labour	Alf Dubs	20,088	42.4	−1.4
SDP	David Harries	5,634	11.9	−5.6
Green	Sonia Willington	559	1.2	+0.3
Workers Revolutionary	Anthony Bell	116	0.3	New
Majority		857	1.8	N/A
Turnout		47,342	70.7	+4.1
Registered electors		66,979		
Conservative gain from Labour		Swing	+4.6	

General election 1983: Battersea
Party	Candidate	Votes	%	±%
Labour	Alf Dubs	19,248	43.8	−8.8
Conservative	Rupert Allason	15,972	36.4	−1.6
SDP	Michael Harris	7,675	17.5	+10.6
National Front	Michael Salt	539	1.2	New
Ecology	Sonia Willington	377	0.9	New
Campaign for Black & White Unity	T. Jackson	86	0.2	New
Community	K. Purie-Harwell	22	0.1	±0.0
Majority		3,276	7.4	−7.3
Turnout		43,919	66.6	−3.1
Registered electors		65,938		
Labour win (new seat)				

=== Elections in the 1970s ===
1979 notional result
Party	Vote	%
Labour	24,810	52.6
Conservative	17,847	37.8
Liberal	3,234	6.9
Others	1,298	2.8
Turnout	47,189	
Electorate		

=== Elections in the 1910s ===
General election December 1910: Battersea and Clapham, Battersea
Party	Candidate	Votes	%	±%
Lib-Lab	John Burns	7,836	52.8	+1.1
Conservative	John Lane Harrington	6,544	44.0	−4.3
Ind. Labour Party	Charles Nathaniel Lowe Shaw	477	3.2	New
Majority		1,292	8.8	+5.4
Turnout		18,927	78.5	−8.8
Registered electors		18,927		
Lib-Lab hold		Swing	+2.6	

General election January 1910: Battersea and Clapham, Battersea
Party	Candidate	Votes	%	±%
Lib-Lab	John Burns	8,540	51.7	−4.4
Conservative	Arthur Benn	7,985	48.3	+4.4
Majority		555	3.4	−8.8
Turnout		18,927	87.3	+1.6
Registered electors		18,927		
Lib-Lab hold		Swing	-4.4	

=== Elections in the 1900s ===
General election 1906: Battersea
Party	Candidate	Votes	%	±%
Lib-Lab	John Burns	7,387	56.1	+5.0
Conservative	Arthur Benn	5,787	43.9	−5.0
Majority		1,600	12.2	+10.0
Turnout		13,174	85.7	+6.2
Registered electors		15,369		
Lib-Lab hold		Swing	+5.0	

General election 1900: Battersea
Party	Candidate	Votes	%	±%
Lib-Lab	John Burns	5,860	51.1	−0.1
Conservative	Richard Charles Garton	5,606	48.9	+0.1
Majority		254	2.2	−0.2
Turnout		11,466	79.5	+3.6
Registered electors		14,420		
Lib-Lab hold		Swing	-0.1	

=== Elections in the 1890s ===
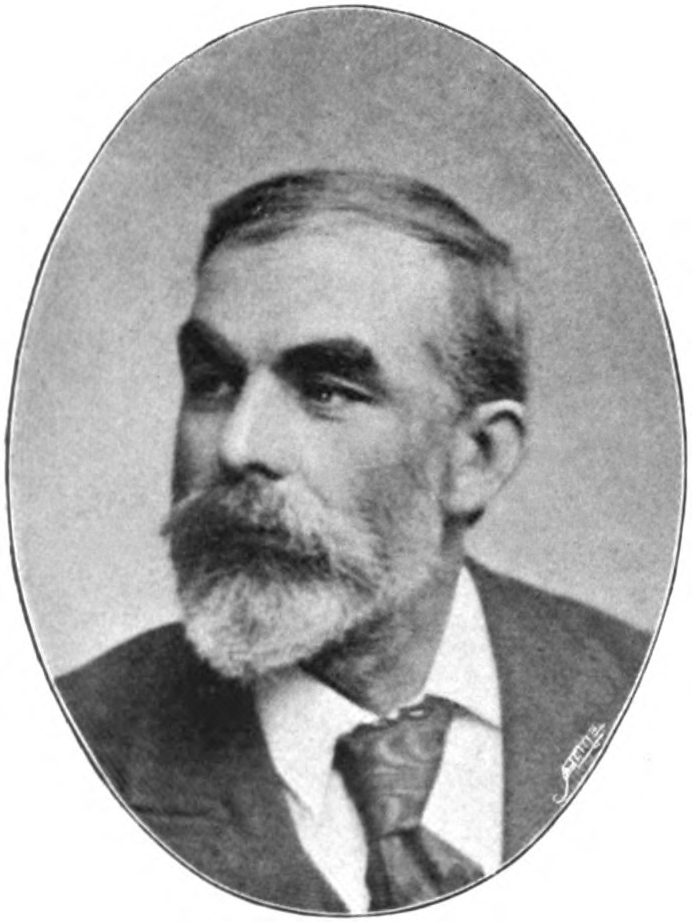
John Burns

General election 1895: Battersea
Party	Candidate	Votes	%	±%
Lib-Lab	John Burns	5,010	51.2	−6.9
Conservative	Charles Ridley Smith	4,766	48.8	+6.9
Majority		244	2.4	N/A
Turnout		9,776	75.9	−2.2
Registered electors		12,880		
Lib-Lab gain from Independent Labour		Swing	-6.9	

General election 1892: Battersea
Party	Candidate	Votes	%	±%
Independent Labour	John Burns	5,616	58.1	New
Conservative	Walter Moresby Chinnery	4,057	41.9	−6.8
Majority		1,559	16.2	N/A
Turnout		9,673	78.1	+6.4
Registered electors		12,381		
Independent Labour gain from Liberal		Swing	N/A	

=== Elections in the 1880s ===
General election 1886: Battersea
Party	Candidate	Votes	%	±%
Liberal	Octavius Morgan	3,683	51.3	−3.3
Conservative	Edward Cooper Willis	3,497	48.7	+3.3
Majority		186	2.6	−6.6
Turnout		7,180	71.7	−6.2
Registered electors		10,019		
Liberal hold		Swing	-3.3	

1886 Battersea by-election
Party	Candidate	Votes	%	±%
Liberal	Octavius Morgan	Unopposed		
Registered electors		10,019		
Liberal hold				

Morgan sought re-election after questions arose about a government contract his firm held.

General election 1885: Battersea
Party	Candidate	Votes	%	±%
Liberal	Octavius Morgan	4,259	54.6	
Conservative	John Edward Cooke	3,547	45.4	
Majority		712	9.2	
Turnout		7,806	77.9	
Registered electors		10,019		
Liberal win (new seat)				

== See also ==
- List of parliamentary constituencies in London
