= Tooting (constituency) =

UK Parliament constituency (since 1974)

Coordinates: 51.438°N 0.165°W

- Borough constituency for the House of Commons
- Interactive map of boundaries from 2024
- Location within Greater London
- County: Greater London
- Electorate: 76,986 (March 2020)

Current constituency
- Created: 1974
- Member of Parliament: Rosena Allin-Khan (Labour)
- Seats: One
- Created from: Wandsworth Central; Battersea South (reduced in 1974, abolished 1983); Streatham (small parts of, with regular interchanges since)

Tooting is a constituency (Note: A borough constituency (for the purposes of election expenses and type of returning officer)) created in 1974 in Greater London. It is represented in the House of Commons of the UK Parliament since 2016 by Rosena Allin-Khan, a member of the Labour Party.

== Constituency profile ==
Foulser Road, Tooting Bec

Tooting is a constituency in Greater London in England, within the Borough of Wandsworth. It covers the areas of Tooting, Streatham Park, Summerstown, Earlsfield and part of Balham.

This is a mostly suburban constituency located around 5 miles (8.0 km) south of the centre of London. Like much of suburban South London, Tooting was a rural village until the late 19th and early 20th centuries when it was absorbed by London's expansion. This constituency is mostly affluent with low levels of deprivation, particularly in the Tooting Bec and Balham areas. Most residents live in dense terraces, flats or large houses converted into shared accommodation. The average house price here is higher than the rest of London and more than double the UK average.

Tooting has a low proportion of retirees and a large population of young professionals; in 2024, nearly 30% of residents were between the ages of 25 and 34. Like much of London, residents have very high rates of income and low levels of homeownership compared to the rest of the UK. The child poverty rate in Tooting is low. Residents are very well-educated and a high proportion work in the health, education and technology sectors. The percentage claiming unemployment benefits is in line with the UK-wide rate. White people made up 67% of the population at the 2021 census, around a quarter of whom were of non-British origin including Irish and Italian communities. Asians, mostly of Indian or Pakistani heritage, were 14% of residents and Black people were 10%.

At the local borough council, most of this constituency is represented by the Labour Party, although the wealthier neighbourhoods in the north of the constituency elected Conservatives. Voters in Tooting overwhelmingly supported remaining in the European Union in the 2016 referendum; an estimated 76% voted to remain compared to the UK-wide figure of 48%, one of the top 20 highest percentages out of 650 constituencies nationwide according to Electoral Calculus.

== Boundaries ==
=== Historic ===
1974–1983: The London Borough of Wandsworth wards of Bedford, Furzedown, Graveney, Springfield, and Tooting.

1983–2010: As above plus Earlsfield, and Nightingale

2010–2022: As above minus Springfield, plus Wandsworth Common.

=== Current ===
Following a local government boundary review which came into effect in May 2022, the constituency now comprises the following wards of the London Borough of Wandsworth:

- Balham (part); Furzedown; South Balham; Tooting Bec; Tooting Broadway; Trinity; Wandle; Wandsworth Common; and a small part of Wandsworth Town.

The 2023 review of Westminster constituencies, which was based on the ward structure in place at 1 December 2020, left the boundaries unchanged.

Tooting is the south-eastern third of the London Borough of Wandsworth. In addition to Tooting, it includes the districts of Earlsfield, Furzedown and Streatham Park and part of Balham. (Note: Balham broadly west of its railway line, but also including the streets around Nightingale Square at its centre) The constituency includes part of Wandsworth Common, a rectangular open space that lends its name to one of the seven wards.

Tooting between 2010 and 2024 was bordered to the west by Putney and Wimbledon; to the other three compass points by Mitcham and Morden, Streatham and Battersea.

Following boundary changes first used for the 2024 general election, Tooting is bordered to the west by Putney and Wimbledon, to the south by Mitcham and Morden, to the east by Streatham and Croydon North and to the north by Battersea and Clapham and Brixton Hill.

== History ==
The constituency was created for the February 1974 election from areas which, prior to that election, were within Battersea South, Streatham and Wandsworth Central.

=== Political history ===
Held by Labour since its creation, Tooting was a target seat for the Conservatives at the 2010 general election after the party made gains in local elections. However, Sadiq Khan was able to retain the seat for Labour. The Conservatives have generally performed best in the northern half of the seat - Balham, Earlsfield and Wandsworth Common - whereas Labour are strongest in the southern half, which covers Tooting itself and Furzedown.

The 2015 general election result gave the seat the twenty-fourth-most marginal majority of Labour's 232 seats by percentage of majority. Had the majority obtained by Allin-Khan at her 2016 by-election win been part of the 2015 results, the seat would have been the 136th safest of Labour's 232 seats by percentage of majority.

In the 2016 referendum to leave the European Union, the constituency voted remain by 74.7%.

Local government indications

As in the other two constituencies located in the London Borough of Wandsworth, voters historically have in part supported the Conservatives at the local level; however, the southern area has strong enough Labour support to have consistently returned at least seven Labour councillors since 1992. As of January 2026, only one ward wholly within the constituency - Wandsworth Common - elected any Conservative councillors. The two wards that are partially within Tooting - Balham and Wandsworth Town - are split wards with both Labour and Conservative councillors. Following the 2026 local elections, the Conservatives gained a seat in both Wandle (covering Earlsfield) and Trinity (covering parts of Tooting Bec and Balham) wards, while the Greens came within fifty votes of winning their first ever seat on Wandsworth Council, in Tooting Broadway ward.

=== Prominent frontbenchers ===
Sadiq Khan, a solicitor by profession, was the Minister of State for Transport and Minister of State for Communities in the government of Gordon Brown. In opposition after 2010, he became the Shadow Secretary of State for Justice and Lord Chancellor. He was the Labour Party's candidate in the 2016 London mayoral election, and was subsequently elected as Mayor of London. Following his election, Khan announced his intention to resign as MP for Tooting, and on 9 May 2016 he was appointed to the ancient office of Crown Steward and Bailiff of The Three Chiltern Hundreds, triggering a by-election.

== Members of Parliament ==
Election	Member	Party	Notes
February 1974	Tom Cox	Labour	
2005	Sadiq Khan	Labour	Elected Mayor of London, May 2016
2016 by-election	Rosena Allin-Khan	Labour	

== Elections ==
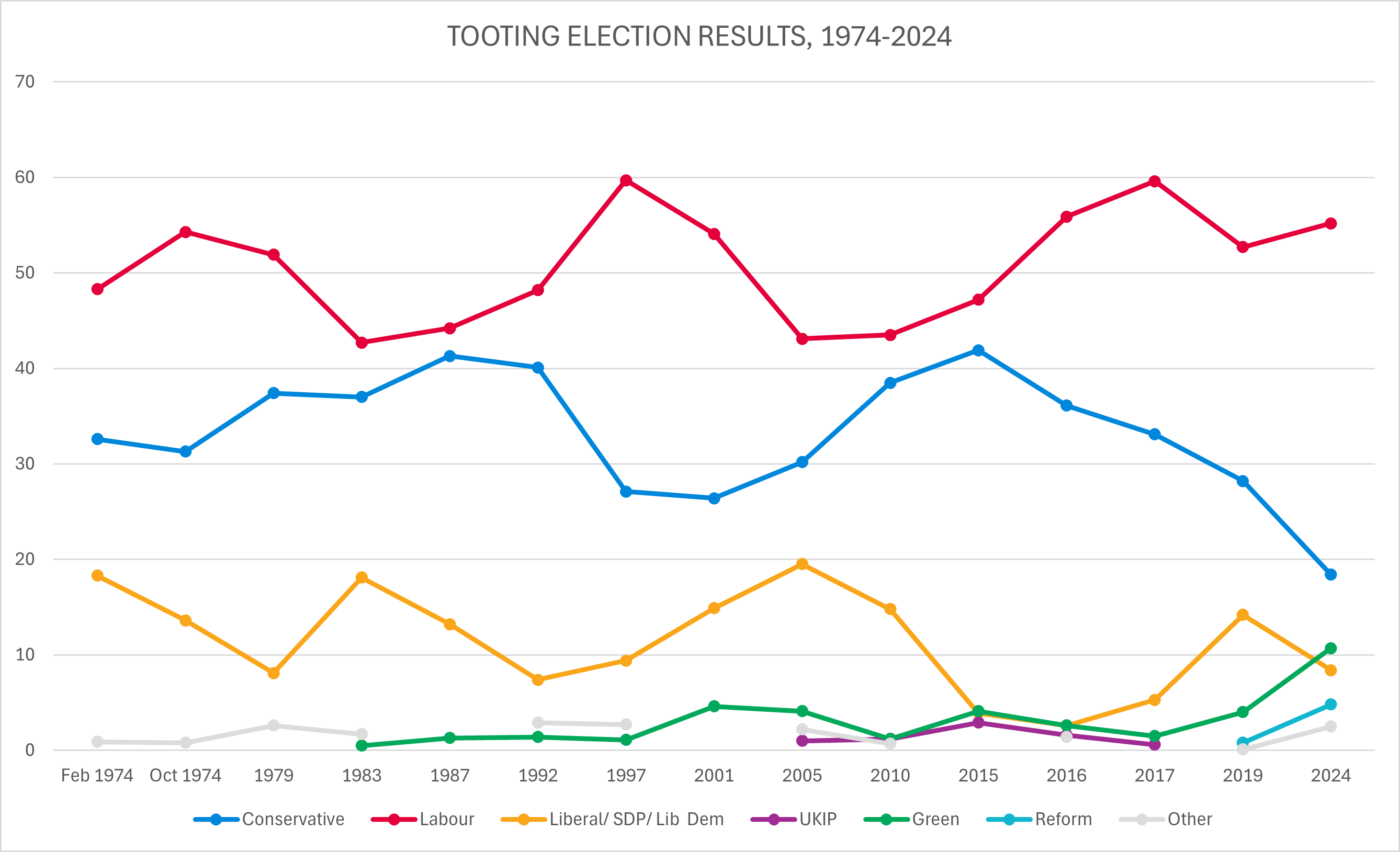
Election results (1974–2024)

=== Elections in the 2020s ===
General election 2024: Tooting
Party	Candidate	Votes	%	±%
Labour	Rosena Allin-Khan	29,209	55.2	▲2.5
Conservative	Ethan Brooks	9,722	18.4	▼9.8
Green	Nick Humberstone	5,672	10.7	▲6.7
Liberal Democrats	Judith Trounson	4,438	8.4	▼5.8
Reform	Andrew Price	2,546	4.8	▲4.0
Workers Party	Tarik Hussain	807	1.5	New
Rejoin EU	Jas Alduk	370	0.7	New
Independent	Davinder Jamus	179	0.3	New
Majority		19,487	36.8	▲12.3
Turnout		52,943	69.6	▼6.4
Registered electors		76,082		
Labour hold		Swing	▲6.2	

=== Elections in the 2010s ===
General election 2019: Tooting
Party	Candidate	Votes	%	±%
Labour	Rosena Allin-Khan	30,811	52.7	−6.9
Conservative	Kerry Briscoe	16,504	28.2	−4.8
Liberal Democrats	Olly Glover	8,305	14.2	+8.9
Green	Glyn Goodwin	2,314	4.0	+2.5
Brexit Party	Adam Shakir	462	0.8	New
SDP	Roz Hubley	77	0.1	New
Majority		14,307	24.5	−2.0
Turnout		58,473	76.0	+1.3
Registered electors		76,933		
Labour hold		Swing	-1.1	

General election 2017: Tooting
Party	Candidate	Votes	%	±%
Labour	Rosena Allin-Khan	34,694	59.6	+12.4
Conservative	Dan Watkins	19,236	33.1	−8.8
Liberal Democrats	Alex Glassbrook	3,057	5.3	+1.4
Green	Esther Obiri-Darko	845	1.5	−2.6
UKIP	Ryan Coshall	339	0.6	−2.3
Majority		15,458	26.5	+21.2
Turnout		58,171	74.7	+5.0
Registered electors		77,971		
Labour hold		Swing	+10.6	

Tooting by-election 2016
Party	Candidate	Votes	%	±%
Labour	Rosena Allin-Khan	17,894	55.9	+8.7
Conservative	Dan Watkins	11,537	36.1	−5.8
Green	Esther Obiri-Darko	830	2.6	−1.5
Liberal Democrats	Alex Glassbrook	820	2.6	−1.4
UKIP	Elizabeth Jones	507	1.6	−1.3
CPA	Des Coke	164	0.5	New
Monster Raving Loony	Alan "Howling Laud" Hope	54	0.2	New
English Democrat	Graham Moore	50	0.2	New
Immigrants Political Party	Akbar Ali Malik	44	0.1	New
One Love	Ankit Love	32	0.1	New
Independent	Zirwa Javaid	30	0.1	New
Independent	Zia Samadani	23	0.1	New
Give Me Back Elmo	Bobby Smith	9	0.0	New
Independent	Smiley Smillie	5	0.0	New
Majority		6,357	19.8	+14.5
Turnout		32,048	42.5	−27.2
Registered electors		74,701		
Labour hold		Swing	+7.3	

General election 2015: Tooting
Party	Candidate	Votes	%	±%
Labour	Sadiq Khan	25,263	47.2	+3.7
Conservative	Dan Watkins	22,421	41.9	+3.4
Green	Esther Obiri-Darko	2,201	4.1	+2.9
Liberal Democrats	Philip Ling	2,107	3.9	−10.9
UKIP	Przemek Skwirczyński	1,537	2.9	+1.7
Majority		2,842	5.3	+0.3
Turnout		53,529	69.7	+1.1
Registered electors		76,782		
Labour hold		Swing	+0.1	

General election 2010: Tooting
Party	Candidate	Votes	%	±%
Labour	Sadiq Khan	22,038	43.5	+0.8
Conservative	Mark Clarke	19,514	38.5	+8.0
Liberal Democrats	Nasser Butt	7,509	14.8	−4.8
UKIP	Strachan D. McDonald	624	1.2	+0.2
Green	Roy Vickery	609	1.2	−2.9
Independent	Susan John-Richards	190	0.4	New
Christian	Shereen Paul	171	0.3	New
Majority		2,524	5.0	−7.9
Turnout		50,655	68.6	+9.3
Registered electors		73,840		
Labour hold		Swing	−3.6	

=== Elections in the 2000s ===
General election 2005: Tooting
Party	Candidate	Votes	%	±%
Labour	Sadiq Khan	17,914	43.1	−11.0
Conservative	James Bethell	12,533	30.2	+3.8
Liberal Democrats	Stephanie M. Dearden	8,110	19.5	+4.6
Green	Siobhan M. Vitelli	1,695	4.1	−0.5
Respect	Ali J. Zaidi	700	1.7	New
UKIP	Strachan D. McDonald	424	1.0	New
Independent	Ian K. Perkin	192	0.5	New
Majority		5,381	12.9	−14.8
Turnout		41,568	59.0	+4.1
Registered electors		70,510		
Labour hold		Swing	−7.4	

General election 2001: Tooting
Party	Candidate	Votes	%	±%
Labour	Tom Cox	20,332	54.1	−5.6
Conservative	Alexander Nicoll	9,932	26.4	−0.7
Liberal Democrats	Simon James	5,583	14.9	+5.5
Green	Matthew Ledbury	1,744	4.6	+3.5
Majority		10,400	27.7	−4.9
Turnout		37,591	54.9	−14.4
Registered electors		68,447		
Labour hold		Swing	-2.5	

=== Elections in the 1990s ===
General election 1997: Tooting
Party	Candidate	Votes	%	±%
Labour	Tom Cox	27,516	59.7	+11.5
Conservative	James B.B. Hutchings	12,505	27.1	−13.0
Liberal Democrats	Simon James	4,320	9.4	+2.0
Referendum	Angela M. Husband	829	1.8	New
Green	John Rattray	527	1.1	−0.3
Independent	Peter Boddington	161	0.3	New
Independent	Jan Koene	94	0.2	New
Rainbow Dream Ticket	Daniel Bailey-Bond	83	0.2	New
Natural Law	Peter Miller	70	0.2	0.0
Majority		15,011	32.6	+24.5
Turnout		46,105	69.4	−5.4
Registered electors		66,536		
Labour hold		Swing	+12.30	

General election 1992: Tooting
Party	Candidate	Votes	%	±%
Labour	Tom Cox	24,601	48.2	+4.0
Conservative	Martin Winter	20,494	40.1	−1.2
Liberal Democrats	Robert J. Bunce	3,776	7.4	−5.8
Liberal	Carmel Martin	1,340	2.6	New
Green	Paul J. Owens	694	1.4	+0.1
Natural Law	Farrakh Anklesalria	119	0.2	New
Christian Democrat	Michael N. Whitelaw	64	0.1	New
Majority		4,107	8.1	+5.1
Turnout		51,088	74.8	+3.6
Registered electors		68,306		
Labour hold		Swing	+2.6	

=== Elections in the 1980s ===
General election 1987: Tooting
Party	Candidate	Votes	%	±%
Labour	Tom Cox	21,457	44.2	+1.5
Conservative	Martin Winter	20,016	41.3	+4.3
SDP	Jeremy Ambache	6,423	13.2	−4.9
Green	Monica Vickery	621	1.3	+0.8
Majority		1,441	3.0	−2.8
Turnout		48,517	71.2	+3.7
Registered electors		68,116		
Labour hold		Swing	+2.9	

General election 1983: Tooting
Party	Candidate	Votes	%	±%
Labour	Tom Cox	19,640	42.7	−6.7
Conservative	Robin D.R. Harris	16,981	37.0	−1.8
SDP	Julia Neuberger	8,317	18.1	+8.7
National Front	Peter Berbridge	355	0.8	−1.1
Ecology	Elizabeth M. Shaw	255	0.5	New
Communist	Robert E. Lewis	181	0.4	−0.3
Ethnic Minority	H. Patel	146	0.3	New
Workers Revolutionary	Corin Redgrave	72	0.2	New
Majority		2,659	5.7	−8.8
Turnout		45,947	67.5	−3.0
Registered electors		68,083		
Labour hold		Swing	-4.2	

=== Elections in the 1970s ===
General election 1979: Tooting
Party	Candidate	Votes	%	±%
Labour	Tom Cox	18,642	51.9	−2.4
Conservative	Richard Ritchie	13,442	37.4	+6.1
Liberal	Richard Fife	2,917	8.1	−5.5
National Front	Peter Berbridge	682	1.9	New
Communist	Robert Lewis	233	0.7	−0.1
Majority		5,200	14.5	−8.5
Turnout		35,916	70.5	+7.1
Registered electors		50,962		
Labour hold		Swing	+4.2	

General election October 1974: Tooting
Party	Candidate	Votes	%	±%
Labour	Tom Cox	18,530	54.3	+6.0
Conservative	A.C. Elliot	10,675	31.3	−1.3
Liberal	R.F.J. Heron	4,644	13.6	−4.7
Communist	Robert E. Lewis	268	0.8	−0.1
Majority		7,855	23.0	+7.3
Turnout		34,117	63.4	−9.4
Registered electors		53,793		
Labour hold		Swing	+3.6	

General election February 1974: Tooting
Party	Candidate	Votes	%	±%
Labour	Tom Cox	18,795	48.3	
Conservative	A.C. Elliot	12,687	32.6	
Liberal	R.F.J. Heron	7,108	18.3	
Communist	Robert E. Lewis	337	0.9	
Majority		6,108	15.7	
Turnout		38,927	72.8	
Registered electors		53,443		
Labour win (new seat)				

== See also ==
- List of parliamentary constituencies in London
- London Borough of Wandsworth
