= List of Labour Party MPs in London =

The London Labour Party have more MPs in Greater London than any other political party, as of the 2024 United Kingdom general election.

== Members of Parliament since 2024 election ==
MP	Constituency	Majority	% majority
Diane Abbott	Hackney North and Stoke Newington	15,080	36.8
Sagal Abdi-Wali (from 2026)	Holborn and St Pancras	3,364	12.4
Rushanara Ali	Bethnal Green and Stepney	1,689	3.6
Rosena Allin-Khan	Tooting	19,487	36.8
Fleur Anderson	Putney	10,941	25.6
James Asser	West Ham and Beckton	9,254	25.7
Jas Athwal	Ilford South	6,896	16.8
Calvin Bailey	Leyton and Wanstead	13,964	32.0
Apsana Begum	Poplar and Limehouse	12,560	29.2
Dawn Butler	Brent East	13,047	34.5
Ruth Cadbury	Brentford and Isleworth	9,824	21.7
Nesil Caliskan	Barking	11,054	30.3
Bambos Charalambous	Southgate and Wood Green	15,300	33.5
Feryal Clark	Enfield North	12,736	29.3
Ben Coleman	Chelsea and Fulham	152	0.3
Liam Conlon	Beckenham and Penge	12,905	24.7
Deirdre Costigan	Ealing Southall	15,793	33.7
Neil Coyle	Bermondsey and Old Southwark	7,787	20.7
Marsha de Cordova	Battersea	12,039	25.6
Janet Daby	Lewisham East	18,073	44.5
Clive Efford	Eltham and Chislehurst	8,429	14.5
Vicky Foxcroft	Lewisham North	15,782	35.8
Daniel Francis	Bexleyheath and Crayford	2,114	4.9
Barry Gardiner	Brent West	3,793	9.2
Georgia Gould	Queen's Park and Maida Vale	14,913	38.9
Helen Hayes	Dulwich and West Norwood	18,789	41.4
Meg Hillier	Hackney South and Shoreditch	14,737	35.3
Rupa Huq	Ealing Central and Acton	13,995	29.3
Natasha Irons	Croydon East	6,825	15.6
Sarah Jones	Croydon West	14,226	37.3
Uma Kumaran	Stratford and Bow	11,634	26.8
David Lammy	Tottenham	15,434	38.4
Seema Malhotra	Feltham and Heston	7,944	20.4
Siobhain McDonagh	Mitcham and Morden	18,761	41.4
John McDonnell	Hayes and Harlington	12,031	31.4
Margaret Mullane	Dagenham and Rainham	7,173	18.4
James Murray	Ealing North	12,489	28.9
Abena Oppong-Asare	Erith and Thamesmead	16,032	39.7
Kate Osamor	Edmonton and Winchmore Hill	12,632	30.8
Matthew Pennycook	Greenwich and Woolwich	18,366	43.0
David Pinto-Duschinsky	Hendon	15	0.04
Joe Powell	Kensington and Bayswater	2,903	6.9
Steve Reed	Streatham and Croydon North	15,603	35.0
Ellie Reeves	Lewisham West and East Dulwich	18,397	39.7
Bell Ribeiro-Addy	Clapham and Brixton Hill	18,005	42.1
Sarah Sackman	Finchley and Golders Green	4,581	9.2
Tulip Siddiq	Hampstead and Highgate	13,970	28.8
Andy Slaughter	Hammersmith and Chiswick	15,290	33.2
Keir Starmer (to 2026)	Holborn and St Pancras	11,572	30.0
Wes Streeting	Ilford North	528	1.2
Gareth Thomas	Harrow West	6,642	14.6
Emily Thornberry	Islington South and Finsbury	15,455	36.1
Stephen Timms	East Ham	12,863	33.9
Dan Tomlinson	Chipping Barnet	2,914	5.7
Catherine West	Hornsey and Friern Barnet	21,475	43.9

== Members of Parliament (2019–2024) ==
MP	Constituency	Borough parties	Majority	% majority
Diane Abbott	Hackney North and Stoke Newington	Hackney Labour Party	33,188	58.4
Rushanara Ali	Bethnal Green and Bow	Tower Hamlets Labour Party	37,524	62.0
Fleur Anderson	Putney	Putney Labour Party	4,774	9.4
Lyn Brown	West Ham	Newham Labour Party	32,388	53.8
Karen Buck	Westminster North	Westminster Labour Party and Kensington and Chelsea Labour Party	10,5759	25.1
Dawn Butler	Brent Central	Brent Labour Party	20,870	42.5
Ruth Cadbury	Brentford and Isleworth	Hounslow Labour Party	10,514	18.0
Bambos Charalambous	Enfield Southgate	Enfield Labour Party	4,450	9.4
Neil Coyle	Bermondsey and Old Southwark	Southwark Labour Party	16,126	27.5
Stella Creasy	Walthamstow	Waltham Forest Labour Party	30,862	63.8
Jon Cruddas	Dagenham and Rainham	Barking and Dagenham Labour Party	293	0.7
John Cryer	Leyton and Wanstead	Waltham Forest Labour Party	20,808	46.7
Marsha De Cordova	Battersea	Wandsworth Labour Party	5,668	9.5
Janet Daby	Lewisham East	Lewisham Labour Party	5,629	25.6
Clive Efford	Eltham	Greenwich Labour Party	6,296	13.6
Jim Fitzpatrick	Poplar and Limehouse	Tower Hamlets Labour Party	27,712	47.2
Vicky Foxcroft	Lewisham Deptford	Lewisham Labour Party	34,899	63.3
Barry Gardiner	Brent North	Brent Labour Party	17,061	30.2
Harriet Harman	Camberwell and Peckham	Southwark Labour Party	37,316	65.0
Helen Hayes	Dulwich and West Norwood	Southwark Labour Party	28,156	50.1
Meg Hillier	Hackney South and Shoreditch	Hackney Labour Party	37,931	68.5
Margaret Hodge	Barking	Barking and Dagenham Labour Party	21,608	45.3
Rupa Huq	Ealing Central and Acton	Ealing Labour Party	13,807	25.0
Sarah Jones	Croydon Central	Croydon Labour Party	5,652	9.9
Rosena Allin-Khan	Tooting	Wandsworth Labour Party	15,458	26.5
David Lammy	Tottenham	Haringey Labour Party	34,584	70.1
Seema Malhotra	Feltham and Heston	Hounslow Labour Party	15,603	29.4
Siobhain McDonagh	Mitcham and Morden	Merton Labour Party	21,375	44.5
John McDonnell	Hayes and Harlington	Hillingdon Labour Party	18,115	37.9
James Murray	Ealing North	Ealing Labour Party	12,269	24.7
Kate Osamor	Edmonton	Enfield Labour Party	21,115	48.4
Abena Oppong-Asare	Erith and Thamesmead	Bexley Labour Party and Greenwich Labour Party	10,014	22.5
Matthew Pennycook	Greenwich and Woolwich	Greenwich Labour Party	20,714	39.0
Steve Reed	Croydon North	Croydon Labour Party	32,365	54.3
Ellie Reeves	Lewisham West and Penge	Lewisham Labour Party	23,162	43.0
Tulip Siddiq	Hampstead and Kilburn	Brent Labour Party & Camden Labour Party	15,560	26.6
Virendra Sharma	Ealing Southall	Ealing Labour Party	22,090	49.0
Andy Slaughter	Hammersmith	Hammersmith and Fulham Labour Party and Ealing Labour Party	18,651	35.7
Keir Starmer	Holborn and St Pancras	Camden Labour Party	30,509	51.7
Wes Streeting	Ilford North	Redbridge Labour Party	9,639	18.2
Gareth Thomas	Harrow West	Harrow Labour Party	13,314	26.4
Emily Thornberry	Islington South and Finsbury North	Islington Labour Party	20,263	42.7
Stephen Timms	East Ham	Newham Labour Party	39,883	71.2
Catherine West	Hornsey and Wood Green	Haringey Labour Party	30,378	49.3

== See also ==
- List of parliamentary constituencies in London
- List of Conservative Party MPs in London
- List of Liberal Democrat Party MPs in London
