= List of Conservative Party MPs in London =

The Conservative Party members of Parliament make up the second largest group of MPs in the capital. The Conservative Party currently holds 9 seats out of 75 in Greater London.

== Members of Parliament since 2024 election ==
Members of Parliament since the 2024 general election.

MP	Constituency	Majority (votes)	Majority (%)
Gareth Bacon	Orpington	5,118	11.1
Bob Blackman	Harrow East	11,680	24.4
Iain Duncan Smith	Chingford and Woodford Green	4,758	9.8
Louie French	Old Bexley and Sidcup	3,548	7.4
Peter Fortune	Bromley and Biggin Hill	302	0.6
Julia Lopez	Hornchurch and Upminster	394	0.8
Chris Philp	Croydon South	2,313	4.7
Andrew Rosindell	Romford	1,463	3.3
David Simmonds	Ruislip, Northwood and Pinner	7,581	16.1

== Members of Parliament (2019–2024) ==
MP	Constituency	Local party	Majority (votes)	Majority (%)
Nickie Aiken	Cities of London and Westminster	Cities of London and Westminster Conservative Association	3,953	9.3
Gareth Bacon	Orpington	Orpington Conservative Association	22,378	45.9
Bob Blackman	Harrow East	Harrow East Conservative Association	8,170	16.5
Felicity Buchan	Kensington	Kensington, Chelsea and Fulham Conservative Federation	150	0.3
Elliot Colburn	Carshalton and Wallington	Sutton Borough Conservative Federation	629	1.3
Iain Duncan Smith	Chingford and Woodford Green	Chingford and Woodford Green Conservative Association	1,262	2.6
David Evennett	Bexleyheath and Crayford	Bexleyheath & Crayford Conservative Association	13,103	30.3
Mike Freer	Finchley and Golders Green	Finchley and Golders Green Conservative Association	6,562	11.9
Stephen Hammond	Wimbledon	Wimbledon Conservative Association	628	1.2
Greg Hands	Chelsea and Fulham	Kensington, Chelsea and Fulham Conservative Federation	11,241	24.0
Boris Johnson	Uxbridge and South Ruislip	Uxbridge and South Ruislip Conservative Association	7,210	15.0
Julia Lopez	Hornchurch and Upminster	Hornchurch and Upminster Conservative Association	23,308	43.2
Bob Neill	Bromley and Chislehurst	Bromley and Chislehurst Conservative Association	10,891	23.9
Matthew Offord	Hendon	Hendon Conservative Association	4,230	7.7
Chris Philp	Croydon South	Croydon Conservative Federation	12,339	20.8
Andrew Rosindell	Romford	Romford Conservative Association	17,893	37.9
Paul Scully	Sutton & Cheam	Sutton Borough Conservative Federation	8,351	16.5
David Simmonds	Ruislip, Northwood and Pinner	Ruislip, Northwood and Pinner Conservative Association	16,394	31.0
Bob Stewart	Beckenham	Beckenham Conservative Association	14,258	28.2
Theresa Villiers	Chipping Barnet	Chipping Barnet Conservative Association	1,212	2.1

== Members of Parliament (2017–2019) ==
MP	Constituency	Borough Parties	Majority	% majority
Bob Blackman	Harrow East	Harrow Conservative Party	1,757	3.4
James Brokenshire	Old Bexley and Sidcup	Old Bexley & Sidcup Conservative Association	15,466	32.2
Iain Duncan Smith	Chingford and Woodford Green	Waltham Forest Conservative Party	2,438	5.2
David Evennett	Bexleyheath and Crayford	Bexleyheath & Crayford Conservative Association	9,073	20
Mark Field	Cities of London and Westminster	Westminster Conservative Party and City of London Conservative Party	3,148	8.1
Mike Freer	Finchley and Golders Green	Barnet Conservative Party	1,657	3.2
Zac Goldsmith	Richmond Park	Richmond Upon Thames Conservative Party	45	0.07
Justine Greening	Putney	Richmond upon Thames Conservative Party	1,554	3.3
Stephen Hammond	Wimbledon	Merton Conservative Party	5,622	10.9
Greg Hands	Chelsea and Fulham	Hammersmith and Fulham Conservative Party and Kensington and Chelsea Conservative Party	8,188	19.4
Nick Hurd	Ruislip, Northwood and Pinner	Harrow Conservative Party and Hillingdon Conservative Party	13,980	26.2
Boris Johnson	Uxbridge and South Ruislip	Hillingdon Conservative Party	5,034	10.8
Jo Johnson	Orpington	Bromley Conservative Party	19,453	38.5
Bob Neill	Bromley and Chislehurst	Bromley Conservative Party	9,590	20.6
Matthew Offord	Hendon	Barnet Conservative Party	1,072	2
Chris Philp	Croydon South	Croydon Conservative Party	11,406	18.6
Andrew Rosindell	Romford	Havering Conservative Party	13,778	27.6
Paul Scully	Sutton & Cheam	Sutton Conservative Party	12,698	24.4
Bob Stewart	Beckenham	Bromley Conservative Party	15,087	29
Angela Watkinson	Hornchurch and Upminster	Havering Conservative Party	17,723	31.6
Theresa Villiers	Chipping Barnet	Barnet Conservative Party	353	0.6

== Members of Parliament (2015–2017) ==
MP	Constituency	Borough Parties	Majority	% majority
Gavin Barwell	Croydon Central	Croydon Conservative Party	165	0.3
James Berry	Kingston & Surbiton	Kingston & Surbiton Conservative Party	2,834	4.8
Bob Blackman	Harrow East	Harrow Conservative Party	4,757	9.7
Victoria Borwick	Kensington	Kensington and Chelsea Conservative Party	7,361	21.1
James Brokenshire	Old Bexley and Sidcup	Old Bexley & Sidcup Conservative Association	15,803	33.8
David Burrowes	Enfield Southgate	Enfield Conservative Party	4,753	10.4
Iain Duncan Smith	Chingford and Woodford Green	Waltham Forest Conservative Party	8,386	19.1
Jane Ellison	Battersea	Wandsworth Conservative Party	7,938	15.6
David Evennett	Bexleyheath and Crayford	Bexleyheath & Crayford Conservative Association	9,192	21.1
Mark Field	Cities of London and Westminster	Westminster Conservative Party and City of London Conservative Party	9,671	26.7
Mike Freer	Finchley and Golders Green	Barnet Conservative Party	5,662	11.2
Justine Greening	Putney	Richmond upon Thames Conservative Party	10,180	23.8
Stephen Hammond	Wimbledon	Merton Conservative Party	12,619	26.1
Greg Hands	Chelsea and Fulham	Hammersmith and Fulham Conservative Party and Kensington and Chelsea Conservative Party	16,022	39.8
Nick Hurd	Ruislip, Northwood and Pinner	Harrow Conservative Party and Hillingdon Conservative Party	20,224	39.5
Boris Johnson	Uxbridge and South Ruislip	Hillingdon Conservative Party	10,695	23.9
Jo Johnson	Orpington	Bromley Conservative Party	19,979	40.7
Tania Mathias	Twickenham	Twickenham Conservative Party	2,017	3.3
Bob Neill	Bromley and Chislehurst	Bromley Conservative Party	13,564	30.8
Matthew Offord	Hendon	Barnet Conservative Party	3,724	7.5
Chris Philp	Croydon South	Croydon Conservative Party	17,410	29.7
Andrew Rosindell	Romford	Havering Conservative Party	13,859	28.2
Paul Scully	Sutton & Cheam	Sutton Conservative Party	3,921	7.9
Bob Stewart	Beckenham	Bromley Conservative Party	18,471	37.8
Angela Watkinson	Hornchurch and Upminster	Havering Conservative Party	13,074	23.7
Theresa Villiers	Chipping Barnet	Barnet Conservative Party	7,656	14.4

== Members of Parliament (2010–2015) ==
MP	Constituency	Borough Parties
Gavin Barwell	Croydon Central	Croydon Conservative Party
Robert Blackman	Harrow East	Harrow Conservative Party
Nick de Bois	Enfield North	Enfield Conservative Party
Angie Bray	Ealing Central and Acton	Ealing Conservative Party
James Brokenshire	Old Bexley and Sidcup	Bexley Conservative Party
David Burrowes	Enfield Southgate	Enfield Conservative Party
Iain Duncan Smith	Chingford and Woodford Green	Waltham Forest Conservative Party
Jane Ellison	Battersea	Wandsworth Conservative Party
David Evennett	Bexleyheath and Crayford	Bexley Conservative Party
Mark Field	Cities of London and Westminster	Westminster Conservative Party and City of London Conservative Party
Mike Freer	Finchley and Golders Green	Barnet Conservative Party
Zac Goldsmith	Richmond Park	Richmond upon Thames Conservative Party
Justine Greening	Putney	Richmond upon Thames Conservative Party
Stephen Hammond	Wimbledon	Merton Conservative Party
Greg Hands	Chelsea and Fulham	Hammersmith and Fulham Conservative Party and Kensington and Chelsea Conservative Party
Nick Hurd	Ruislip, Northwood and Pinner	Harrow Conservative Party and Hillington Conservative Party
Jo Johnson	Orpington	Bromley Conservative Party
Mary Macleod	Brentford and Isleworth	Hounslow Conservative Party
Bob Neill	Bromley and Chislehurst	Bromley Conservative Party
Matthew Offord	Hendon	Barnet Conservative Party
Richard Ottaway	Croydon South	Croydon Conservative Party
John Randall	Uxbridge and South Ruislip	Hillingdon Conservative Party
Malcolm Rifkind	Kensington	Kensington and Chelsea Conservative Party
Andrew Rosindell	Romford	Havering Conservative Party
Lee Scott	Ilford North	Redbridge Conservative Party
Bob Stewart	Beckenham	Bromley Conservative Party
Angela Watkinson	Hornchurch and Upminster	Havering Conservative Party
Theresa Villiers	Chipping Barnet	Barnet Conservative Party

== Members of Parliament (2005–2010) ==
MP	Constituency
James Brokenshire	Hornchurch
David Burrowes	Enfield Southgate
Derek Conway	Old Bexley and Sidcup
Iain Duncan Smith	Chingford and Woodford Green
Clive Efford	Eltham
David Evennett	Bromley and Chislehurst
Mark Field	Cities of London and Westminster
Justine Greening	Putney
Stephen Hammond	Wimbledon
Greg Hands	Hammersmith and Fulham
John Horam	Orpington
Nick Hurd	Ruislip Northwood
Jacqui Lait	Beckenham
Richard Ottaway	Croydon South
Andrew Pelling	Croydon Central
John Randall	Uxbridge
Malcolm Rifkind	Kensington and Chelsea
Andrew Rosindell	Romford
Lee Scott	Ilford North
Angela Watkinson	Upminster
Theresa Villiers	Chipping Barnet

== See also ==
- London Conservatives
- List of parliamentary constituencies in London
- List of Labour Party MPs in London
- List of Liberal Democrat Party MPs in London
