= 2022 Wandsworth London Borough Council election =

2022 local election in Wandsworth

2022 Wandsworth Council election
- 5 May 2022

All 58 council seats 30 seats needed for a majority
- Turnout: 41.2%
	First party	Second party	Third party
Leader	Simon Hogg	Ravi Govindia	Malcolm Grimston
Party	Labour	Conservative	Independent
Last election	26 seats, 44.8%	33 seats, 56.9%	1 seat, 1.7%
Seats won	35	22	1
Seat change	▲9	▼11	Steady
Popular vote	112,575	92,566	3,795
Percentage	46.3%	38.0%	1.6%
Swing	▲7.6pp	▼0.3pp	▼0.1pp
- Results of the 2022 Wandsworth London Borough council election.
council control before election
Conservative
Subsequent council control
Labour

The 2022 Wandsworth London Borough Council elections took place on 5 May 2022.

All 58 members of Wandsworth London Borough Council were elected. The elections took place alongside local elections in the other London boroughs and elections to local authorities across the United Kingdom.

In the previous election in 2018, the Conservative Party maintained their longstanding control of the council, winning 33 out of the 60 seats with the Labour Party forming the principal opposition with 26 of the remaining 27 seats. The 2022 election took place under new election boundaries, which reduced the number of councillors to 58. Labour won control for the first time since 1978.

== Background ==
=== History ===
Result of the 2018 borough election

The thirty-two London boroughs were established in 1965 by the London Government Act 1963. They are the principal authorities in Greater London and have responsibilities including education, housing, planning, highways, social services, libraries, recreation, waste, environmental health and revenue collection. Some of the powers are shared with the Greater London Authority, which also manages passenger transport, police, and fire.

Wandsworth was alternately under Labour and Conservative control in the elections after its creation, and subsequently has been under Conservative control since the 1978 election. In the most recent election in 2018, the council was considered a key target for Labour in London. The Conservatives held the council, winning 33 seats with 38.3% of the vote, while Labour won 26 seats with 38.7% of the vote. The independent candidate Malcolm Grimston was also elected.

=== Council term ===
Candida Jones, a Labour councillor for Furzedown, resigned in 2019 due to taking a politically restricted job. Graham Loveland held the seat for Labour in the subsequent by-election, with the Liberal Democrats increasing their share of the vote to come in second place. A Labour councillor for Bedford ward, Fleur Anderson, resigned in April 2021 having been elected as MP for Putney in the 2019 general election. A by-election to fill the seat was held on 6 May 2021 alongside the 2021 London mayoral election and London Assembly election, which was won by the Labour candidate Hannah Stanislaus. In August 2021, Stanislaus resigned from the Labour Party to sit as independent, saying that she had "been bullied out" and that the party whip had made a personal attack against her in a report. She later resigned as a councillor, with a by-election held on 25 November. The Labour candidate Sheila Boswell held it for the party with a majority of a single vote over the Conservative candidate.

Along with most London boroughs, Wandsworth was electing councillors under new ward boundaries in 2022. Following local consultation, the Local Government Boundary Commission for England produced new boundaries reducing the number of councillors from 60 to 58 across fourteen three-councillor wards and eight two-seat wards.

== Campaign ==
The Conservative peer Robert Hayward said that his party was "almost certain" to lose control of the borough in the wake of the partygate scandal. At the 2019 general election, all the constituencies that cover the borough were represented by Labour MPs. Nick Bowes, the chief executive of the Centre for London, highlighted that the mayor of London Sadiq Khan had won a majority of wards in the borough in the 2021 London mayoral election.

Extinction Rebellion campaigners disrupted the launch of the Conservative campaign at a luxury car dealership. The Labour Party promised to build a thousand "new council homes on council land" if they won. The Labour councillor Peter Carpenter was suspended and blocked from standing for re-election by his party in March 2022 for posting on Twitter that the Conservative chancellor of the Exchequer Rishi Sunak should "go back to India".

== Electoral process ==
Wandsworth, as with all other London borough councils, elects all of its councillors at once every four years, with the previous election having taken place in 2018. The election took place by multi-member first-past-the-post voting, with each ward being represented by two or three councillors. Electors had as many votes as there were councillors to be elected in their ward, with the top two or three being elected.

All registered electors (British, Irish, Commonwealth and European Union citizens) living in London aged 18 or over were entitled to vote in the election. People who lived at two addresses in different councils, such as university students with different term-time and holiday addresses, were entitled to be registered for and vote in elections in both local authorities. Voting in-person at polling stations took place from 7:00 to 22:00 on election day, and voters were able to apply for postal votes or proxy votes in advance of the election.

== Council composition ==
Councillors after the 2018 election

Councillors ahead of the 2022 election

After 2018 election		Before 2022 election		After 2022 election	
Party	Seats	Party	Seats	Party	Seats
Conservative	33	Conservative	33	Labour	35
Labour	26	Labour	26	Conservative	22
Independent	1	Independent	1	Independent	1

== Results summary ==
2022 Wandsworth London Borough Council election
Party	Seats	Gains	Losses	Net gain/loss	Seats %	Votes %	Votes	+/−
Labour	35	10	1	▲9	60.3	46.3	112,575	+7.6
Conservative	22	1	12	▼11	37.9	38.0	92,566	-0.3
Independent	1	0	0	Steady	1.7	1.6	3,795	-2.1
Green	0	0	0	Steady	0.0	7.6	18,546	-0.3
Liberal Democrats	0	0	0	Steady	0.0	6.4	15,599	-2.1
TUSC	0	0	0	Steady	0.0	0.1	218	New

== Ward results ==
=== Balham ===
Balham (3)
Party	Candidate	Votes	%
Conservative	Lynsey Hedges	2,284	43.5
Conservative	Daniel Hamilton	2,250	42.8
Labour	Jo Rigby	2,214	42.1
Conservative	Azhar Chaudhry	2,188	41.6
Labour	Douglas Oddy	1,963	37.4
Labour	Richard Taylor	1,913	36.4
Green	Alexa Crow	659	12.5
Green	Ben Burt	528	10.0
Green	John Low	514	9.8
Liberal Democrats	Provence Maydew	405	7.7
Liberal Democrats	Shanaz Casoojee	353	6.7
Liberal Democrats	Raaid Casoojee	294	5.6
Turnout		5,254	42.2
Conservative hold			
Conservative hold			
Labour gain from Conservative			

=== Battersea Park ===
Battersea Park (3)
Party	Candidate	Votes	%
Labour	Juliana Annan	1,991	47.7
Labour	Tony Belton	1,975	47.3
Labour	Maurice McLeod	1,760	42.2
Conservative	Rory Manley	1,404	33.6
Conservative	Sami Abouzahra	1,355	32.5
Conservative	Mariette Miemietz	1,280	30.7
Green	Isabel Losada	689	16.5
Green	Emma Buckley	557	13.3
Liberal Democrats	Teresa Norman	396	9.5
Liberal Democrats	Petri Vitiello	240	5.8
Independent	Shaun O'Mara	106	2.5
Turnout		4,173	32.6
Labour win (new seat)			
Labour win (new seat)			
Labour win (new seat)			

=== East Putney ===
East Putney (3)
Party	Candidate	Votes	%
Conservative	Ravi Govindia	2,179	43.1
Labour	Fianna Ayres	2,147	42.4
Conservative	George Crivelli	2,144	42.4
Conservative	Michael Stephens	2,047	40.5
Labour	Eileen Flanagan	1,907	37.7
Labour	Susan Olech	1,727	34.1
Green	Graham Cooper	702	13.9
Liberal Democrats	Eleanor Doody	672	13.3
Green	Clive Price	440	8.7
Liberal Democrats	John Williams	396	7.8
Liberal Democrats	Mark Lejman	391	7.7
Turnout		5,059	41.3
Conservative hold			
Labour gain from Conservative			
Conservative hold			

=== Falconbrook ===
Falconbrook (2)
Party	Candidate	Votes	%
Labour	Kate Stock	1,607	68.9
Labour	Simon Hogg	1,603	68.8
Conservative	Andrew Mitchell	607	26.0
Conservative	Jasmine Rahman	557	23.9
TUSC	Kim Hendry	120	5.1
Turnout		2,331	30.5
Labour win (new seat)			
Labour win (new seat)			

=== Furzedown ===
Furzedown (3)
Party	Candidate	Votes	%
Labour	Leonie Cooper	3,232	68.8
Labour	Katrina Ffrench	2,939	62.5
Labour	Judi Gasser	2,893	61.6
Conservative	Robert Broadhurst	973	20.7
Green	Shaun Collins	936	19.9
Conservative	Jonathan Iliff	936	19.9
Conservative	Thomas Mathers	935	19.9
Liberal Democrats	Andrew Bracken	322	6.9
Liberal Democrats	Clare Murray	288	6.1
Liberal Democrats	Sudi Piggot	177	3.8
Turnout		4,699	38.9
Labour hold			
Labour hold			
Labour hold			

=== Lavender ===
Lavender (2)
Party	Candidate	Votes	%
Conservative	Jonathan Cook	1,495	45.8
Conservative	Tom Pridham	1,391	42.6
Labour	Martin Linton	1,298	39.8
Labour	Rebecca Tate	1,206	36.9
Green	Cyril Richert	445	13.6
Liberal Democrats	Jenny Voyce	294	9.0
Liberal Democrats	Mike Radcliffe	268	8.2
Turnout		3,265	38.0
Conservative win (new seat)			
Conservative win (new seat)			

=== Nine Elms ===
Nine Elms (2)
Party	Candidate	Votes	%
Conservative	Matthew Corner	352	39.9
Conservative	Mark Justin	328	37.2
Labour	Alexander Christian	261	29.6
Labour	Maha Younes	250	28.3
Liberal Democrats	Mark Gitsham	239	27.1
Liberal Democrats	Sue Wixley	212	24.0
Green	Joanna Zeenny	41	4.6
Green	Andrew Macmillan	34	3.9
Turnout		882	31.1
Conservative win (new seat)			
Conservative win (new seat)			

=== Northcote ===
Northcote (2)
Party	Candidate	Votes	%
Conservative	Emmeline Owens	2,244	53.5
Conservative	Aled Richards-Jones	2,168	51.7
Labour	Emily Wintle	1,377	32.8
Labour	James Toone	1,094	26.1
Green	Joe Taylor	754	18.0
Liberal Democrats	Ben Morris	544	13.0
Turnout		4,197	48.4
Conservative hold			
Conservative hold			

=== Roehampton ===
Roehampton (3)
Party	Candidate	Votes	%
Labour	Jenny Yates	1,909	51.2
Labour	Matthew Tiller	1,865	50.0
Labour	Graeme Henderson	1,855	49.8
Conservative	Jane Cooper	1,247	33.4
Conservative	Ray Chapman	1,183	31.7
Conservative	Deen Ossman	1,154	31.0
Green	Terence Brown	357	9.6
Liberal Democrats	Henry Compson	351	9.4
Liberal Democrats	Ben Speedy	312	8.4
Green	Matthew Palmer	307	8.2
TUSC	Deji Olayinka	98	2.6
Turnout		3,728	33.6
Labour win (new seat)			
Labour win (new seat)			
Labour win (new seat)			

=== Shaftesbury & Queenstown ===
Shaftesbury & Queenstown (3)
Party	Candidate	Votes	%
Labour	Sara Linton	1,966	57.7
Labour	Aydin Dikerdem	1,879	55.1
Labour	Stephen Worrall	1,563	45.9
Conservative	Marie Hanson	1,090	32.0
Conservative	Jonathan Clamp	1,077	31.6
Conservative	Keith Kelsall	982	28.8
Green	Max Ellis	668	19.6
Liberal Democrats	James Munro	421	12.4
Turnout		3,408	31.4
Labour win (new seat)			
Labour win (new seat)			
Labour win (new seat)			

=== South Balham ===
South Balham (2)
Party	Candidate	Votes	%
Labour	Clare Fraser	1,850	52.3
Labour	Norman Marshall	1,518	42.9
Conservative	Tom Mytton	1,425	40.3
Conservative	Nabi Toktas	1,271	36.0
Green	Roy Vickery	451	12.8
Liberal Democrats	Arminel Fennelly	230	6.5
Liberal Democrats	David Lane	175	5.0
Turnout		3,535	46.4
Labour win (new seat)			
Labour win (new seat)			

=== Southfields ===
Southfields (2)
Party	Candidate	Votes	%
Conservative	Kim Caddy	1,853	44.2
Conservative	Guy Humphries	1,763	42.0
Labour	Lee Fennell	1,702	40.6
Labour	Pablo John	1,607	38.3
Green	Ingrid Redcliffe	385	9.2
Liberal Democrats	Pat Durai-Bates	375	8.9
Green	Fergal McEntee	323	7.7
Liberal Democrats	Fabio Quaradeghini	261	6.2
Turnout		4,197	47.4
Conservative hold			
Conservative hold			

=== St Mary's ===
St Mary's (3)
Party	Candidate	Votes	%
Labour	Jessica Lee	1,914	47.0
Labour	Jamie Colclough	1,880	46.2
Conservative	Caroline de la Soujeole	1,700	41.7
Conservative	Zachary Evans	1,693	41.6
Labour	Michael Stone	1,690	41.5
Conservative	Rhodri Morgan	1,659	40.7
Green	Byron Brown	465	11.4
Green	Lu Curtis	438	10.8
Liberal Democrats	Tudor Nicholls	348	8.5
Turnout		4,072	39.5
Labour win (new seat)			
Labour win (new seat)			
Conservative win (new seat)			

=== Thamesfield ===
Thamesfield (3)
Party	Candidate	Votes	%
Conservative	Ethan Brooks	2,292	43.0
Conservative	James Jeffreys	2,221	41.7
Conservative	John Locker	2,212	41.5
Labour	Chris Locke	1,768	33.2
Labour	Diana Robinson	1,763	33.1
Labour	Stephen Gibbons	1,762	33.1
Liberal Democrats	Paul Benton	744	14.0
Liberal Democrats	Becky Grubb	733	13.8
Liberal Democrats	Gabriel Barton-Singer	701	13.2
Green	Emma Killick	556	10.4
Green	Diana McCann	526	9.9
Green	Penny Staniaszek	377	7.1
Turnout		5,325	44.5
Conservative hold			
Conservative hold			
Conservative hold			

=== Tooting Bec ===
Tooting Bec (3)
Party	Candidate	Votes	%
Labour	Sheila Boswell	2,787	62.1
Labour	Annamarie Critchard	2,759	61.4
Labour	Paul White	2,258	50.3
Conservative	Jonathan Styles	1,073	23.9
Conservative	Mike Pautsch	1,061	23.6
Conservative	Mozes Megyesi	1,041	23.2
Green	Lisa Osborne	695	15.5
Green	Steve Jones	536	11.9
Liberal Democrats	Lara Fiorani	400	8.9
Liberal Democrats	David Elliott	268	6.0
Liberal Democrats	Maltby Pindar	189	4.2
Turnout		4,491	37.0
Labour win (new seat)			
Labour win (new seat)			
Labour win (new seat)			

=== Tooting Broadway ===
Tooting Broadway (3)
Party	Candidate	Votes	%
Labour	Kate Forbes	2,773	67.9
Labour	Kemi Akinola	2,762	67.6
Labour	Andy Gibbons	2,339	57.3
Conservative	Gerald Brent	849	20.8
Conservative	Neil Caddy	768	18.8
Conservative	James McLoughlin	754	18.5
Green	Tom Fitzhardinge	680	16.7
Liberal Democrats	Catie Tuttle	277	6.8
Liberal Democrats	Stephen Bieniek	272	6.7
Liberal Democrats	Simon Sharich	195	4.8
Turnout		4,083	34.3
Labour win (new seat)			
Labour win (new seat)			
Labour win (new seat)			

=== Trinity ===
Trinity (2)
Party	Candidate	Votes	%
Labour	Lizzy Dobres	2,074	48.5
Labour	Jack Mayorcas	1,827	42.7
Conservative	Kirsten Botting	1,680	39.3
Conservative	Crawford Anderson	1,672	39.1
Green	Ann Pasola	407	9.5
Liberal Democrats	Jon Irwin	387	9.1
Liberal Democrats	Paul Tibbles	369	8.6
Turnout		4,276	52.3
Labour win (new seat)			
Labour win (new seat)			

=== Wandle ===
Wandle (2)
Party	Candidate	Votes	%
Labour	Denise Paul	1,750	49.0
Labour	Sarmila Varatharaj	1,668	46.7
Conservative	Siôn Davies	1,456	40.7
Conservative	Adrian Flook	1,435	40.2
Green	Márcia Goodwin	311	8.7
Liberal Democrats	Duncan Lyons	215	6.0
Green	Stephen Midlane	172	4.8
Turnout		3,574	47.5
Labour win (new seat)			
Labour win (new seat)			

=== Wandsworth Common ===
Wandsworth Common (3)
Party	Candidate	Votes	%
Conservative	Angela Graham	2,699	51.5
Conservative	Peter Graham	2,560	48.8
Conservative	Rosemary Birchall	2,448	46.7
Labour	Rebecca Wilson	1,766	33.7
Labour	Daniel Hogan	1,664	31.7
Labour	Thomas Pollard	1,580	30.1
Green	Glyn Goodwin	740	14.1
Green	Daniel Strathearn	543	10.4
Green	Pat Sharpe	503	9.6
Liberal Democrats	Eileen Arms	323	6.2
Liberal Democrats	Caroline Ogden	277	5.3
Liberal Democrats	Haren Thillainathan	174	3.3
Turnout		5,242	44.8
Conservative hold			
Conservative hold			
Conservative hold			

=== Wandsworth Town ===
Wandsworth Town (3)
Party	Candidate	Votes	%
Labour	Sarah Davies	2,835	48.8
Labour	Sana Jafri	2,618	45.1
Conservative	William Sweet	2,472	42.5
Conservative	Rishi Goenka	2,445	42.1
Labour	Sam Nicholas	2,439	42.0
Conservative	Piers McCausland	2,415	41.6
Green	James Couper	623	10.7
Green	Joyce Moreau	543	9.3
Liberal Democrats	Patrick Warren	476	8.2
Turnout		5,811	44.8
Labour win (new seat)			
Labour win (new seat)			
Conservative win (new seat)			

=== West Hill ===
West Hill (3)
Party	Candidate	Votes	%
Independent	Malcolm Grimston	3,689	66.4
Labour	Angela Ireland	2,221	40.0
Conservative	Daniel Ghossain	1,621	29.2
Conservative	Salvatore Murtas	1,620	29.1
Labour	Daniel Shearer	1,557	28.0
Labour	Flavio Ravara	1,529	27.5
Conservative	Terry Walsh	1,096	19.7
Green	Jason Whiffin	644	11.6
Liberal Democrats	Hugh Brown	305	5.5
Liberal Democrats	Douglas Downie	296	5.3
Liberal Democrats	Andrew Hinton	177	3.2
Turnout		5,558	48.9
Independent hold			
Labour hold			
Conservative gain from Labour			

=== West Putney ===
West Putney (3)
Party	Candidate	Votes	%
Labour	Jeremy Ambache	2,676	46.5
Labour	Claire Gilbert	2,605	45.2
Conservative	Steffi Sutters	2,534	44.0
Conservative	Paddy Reid	2,519	43.7
Conservative	Ian Lewer	2,409	41.8
Labour	Graham Loveland	2,239	38.9
Green	Tahira Amini	524	9.1
Liberal Democrats	Joanna Chidgey	515	8.9
Green	Julie Estelle	473	8.2
Liberal Democrats	Cait Hart Dyke	342	5.9
Turnout		5,758	48.0
Labour gain from Conservative			
Labour gain from Conservative			
Conservative hold			

== Party changes ==
On 8 August 2025, Cllr Mark Justin (Nine Elms) resigned from the Conservatives and joined Reform UK.

== By-elections ==
=== Tooting Broadway 2022 ===
A by-election was called following the death of Labour Cllr Andy Gibbons.

Tooting Broadway: 14 July 2022
Party	Candidate	Votes	%	±%
Labour	Rex Osborn	1,429	62.2	−5.7
Conservative	Jonathan Iliff	491	21.4	+0.6
Green	Lisa Osborne	285	12.4	–4.3
Liberal Democrats	Haren Thillainathan	94	4.1	–2.7
Turnout		2,303		
Rejected ballots		4		
Labour hold		Swing		

=== Tooting Broadway 2024 ===
A by-election was called following the resignation of Cllr Kate Forbes for work reasons.

Tooting Broadway: 18 January 2024
Party	Candidate	Votes	%	±%
Labour	Sean Lawless	1,888	67.3	+5.1
Conservative	Otto Jacobsson	542	19.3	−2.1
Green	Nick Humberstone	261	9.3	–3.1
Liberal Democrats	Haren Thillainathan	113	4.0	–0.1
Majority		1,346	48.0	
Turnout		2,804		
Labour hold		Swing	▲3.0	

=== West Putney ===
A by-election was called following the resignation of Labour councillor Claire Gilbert.

West Putney: 2 May 2024
Party	Candidate	Votes	%	±%
Conservative	Nick Austin	2,839	45.3	+1.3
Labour	Jane Briginshaw	2,350	37.5	−7.7
Liberal Democrats	Mark Lejman	635	10.1	+1.2
Green	Joseph McEntee	438	7.0	−2.1
Majority		489	7.8	N/A
Turnout		6262	52	
Conservative gain from Labour				
