= Lavender (Wandsworth ward) =

Electoral ward in the London Borough of Wandsworth

- Electoral ward for the Wandsworth London Borough Council
- Borough: London Borough of Wandsworth
- County: Greater London
- Population: 13,452 (2021)
- Major settlements: Lavender Hill
- Area: 0.9535 km²

Current electoral ward
- Created: 2022
- Seats: 2

Lavender is an electoral ward in the London Borough of Wandsworth. The ward was first used in the 2022 elections and elects two councillors to Wandsworth London Borough Council.

== Geography ==
The ward is based on the suburb of Lavender Hill.

== Councillors ==
| Election | Councillors | |
|---|---|---|
| 2022 | Jonathan Cook (Conservative) | Tom Pridham (Conservative) |

== Elections ==
=== 2022 ===
Lavender (2)
| Party | Candidate | Votes | % |
|---|---|---|---|
| Conservative | Jonathan Cook | 1,495 | 45.8 |
| Conservative | Tom Pridham | 1,391 | 42.6 |
| Labour | Martin Linton | 1,298 | 39.8 |
| Labour | Rebecca Tate | 1,206 | 36.9 |
| Green | Cyril Richert | 445 | 13.6 |
| Liberal Democrats | Jenny Voyce | 294 | 9.0 |
| Liberal Democrats | Mike Radcliffe | 268 | 8.2 |
| Turnout | | 3,265 | 38.0 |
| Conservative win (new seat) | | | |
| Conservative win (new seat) | | | |

== See also ==
- List of electoral wards in Greater London
