= John Bowis =

British politician (born 1945)

John Bowis OBE
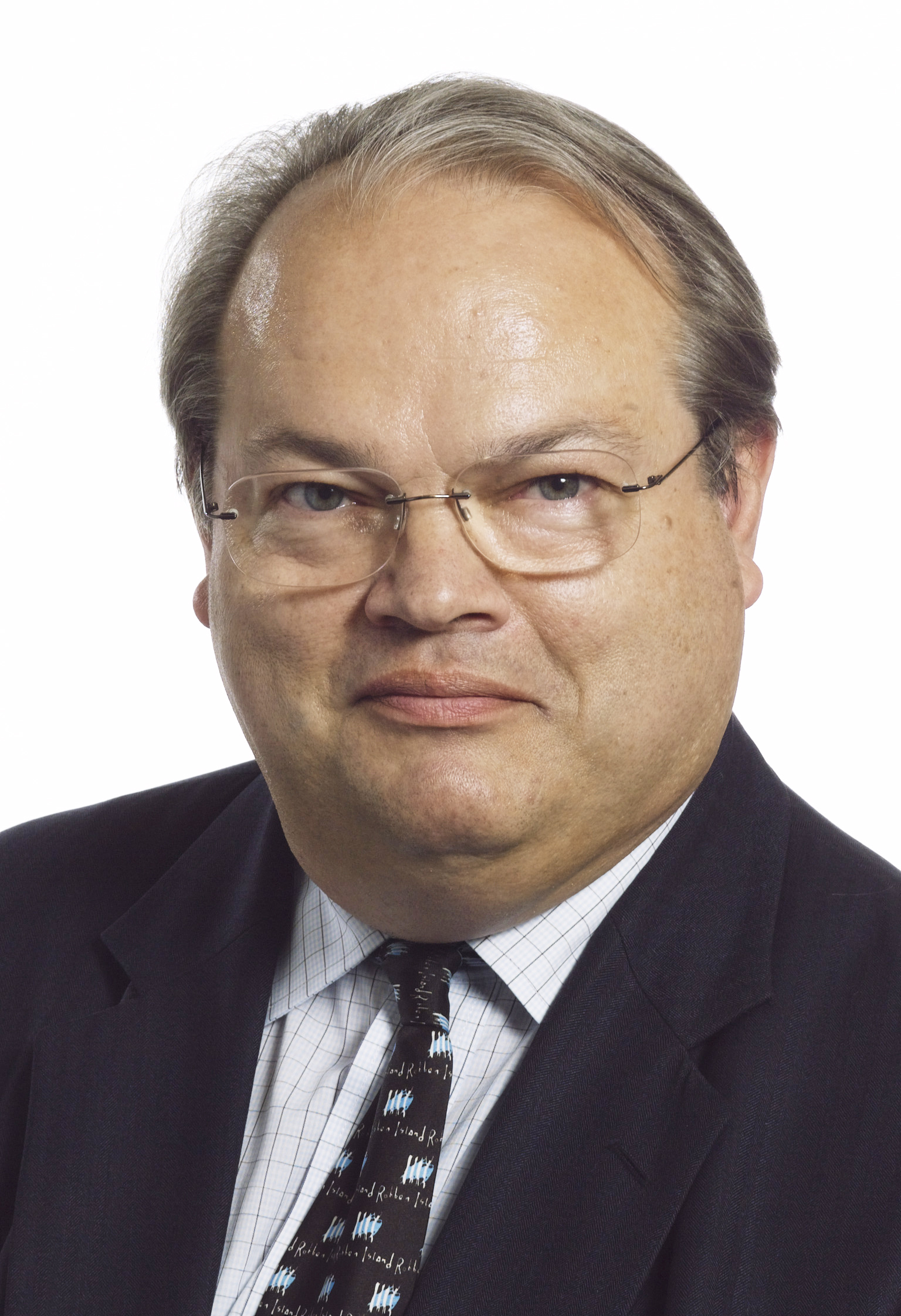

Parliamentary Under-Secretary of State for Transport
- In office 23 July 1996 – 2 May 1997
- Prime Minister: John Major
- Preceded by: Steven Norris
- Succeeded by: Glenda Jackson

Parliamentary Under-Secretary of State for Health and Social Security
- In office 27 May 1993 – 23 July 1996
- Prime Minister: John Major
- Preceded by: Tim Yeo
- Succeeded by: Simon Burns

Member of the European Parliament for London
- In office 15 July 1999 – 1 July 2009
- Preceded by: Constituency established
- Succeeded by: Marina Yannakoudakis

Member of Parliament for Battersea
- In office 11 June 1987 – 8 April 1997
- Preceded by: Alf Dubs
- Succeeded by: Martin Linton

Personal details
- Born: John Crocket Bowis; 2 August 1945 (age 81) Brighton, East Sussex, England
- Party: Conservative
- Education: Brasenose College, Oxford

John Crocket Bowis OBE (born 2 August 1945 in Brighton, East Sussex) is a former Conservative MP and MEP.

== Education ==
John Bowis was educated at Tonbridge School and Brasenose College, Oxford, where he studied Philosophy, Politics and Economics.

== Political life ==
He was first elected at the 1987 general election as Member of Parliament for Battersea. From 1993 to 1996 he was a health minister and from 1996 to 1997 he was a Under-Secretary of State for Transport, before losing his parliamentary seat at the 1997 general election.

At the 1999 European Parliament election Bowis was elected to represent the London region. He was re-elected in 2004, and stood down at the 2009 election.

He has been National Secretary of the Federation of Conservative Students and worked at the Institute of Psychiatry.

He is an active member of the ACP-EU Joint Parliamentary Assembly.

He has served as president of Gay Conservatives, an LGBT group within the Conservative Party.

He is the incumbent vice president of the Conservative Group for Europe (CGE).

In the 2026 Kingston upon Thames London Borough Council election he was a candidate in New Malden Village.

== Notes ==
Parliament of the United Kingdom
Preceded by Alf Dubs	Member of Parliament for Battersea; 1987–1997	Succeeded by Martin Linton
