= Octavius Vaughan Morgan =

Welsh-born Liberal Party politician

Octavius Vaughan Morgan (1837 – 26 February 1896) was a Welsh-born Liberal Party politician who sat in the House of Commons from 1885 to 1892.

The eighth son of Thomas Morgan of Pipton, near Glasbury, Breconshire (1796–1847), he was educated at Priory School, Abergavenny.

With his five brothers, Morgan founded the mercantile firm of Morgan Bros. of Cannon Street, the Patent Plumbago Crucible Company at Battersea (later known as the Morgan Crucible Company), and trade journals such as the European Mail, the Ironmonger and the Chemist and Druggist. He served as a captain in the 7th Surrey Rifle Volunteers and was a justice of the peace for Surrey.

At the 1885 general election Morgan was elected as a Member of Parliament (MP) for Battersea. However, his right to sit was questioned in 1886, as Morgan Crucible Co. held government contracts; from which, however, he had disassociated himself before his nomination. Morgan took the Manor of Northstead to resign from Parliament until the question was settled, but was returned unopposed at the ensuing by-election in February 1886. He held the seat at the general election in July 1886, and sat for Battersea until 1892. At the 1892 general election he instead contested the seat of Ashton-under-Lyne, but failed to be elected.

Morgan married Katharine Anne Simkin, daughter of Henry Simkin of Highbury in 1867. They lived at The Boltons. Their daughter Lucy Marianne married J.F.L. Brunner. His great-nephew was the Conservative politician John Vaughan-Morgan.

Parliament of the United Kingdom
New constituency	Member of Parliament for Battersea; 1885–1892	Succeeded by John Burns
