= Larkhall (Lambeth ward) =

Electoral ward in the London borough of Lambeth

Coordinates: 51.469°N 0.131°W

- Former electoral ward for the Lambeth London Borough Council
- Larkhall ward boundaries from 2002 to 2022
- Borough: Lambeth
- County: Greater London
- Electorate: 12,957 (2018)

Former electoral ward
- Created: 1965
- Abolished: 2022
- Member: 3
- Replaced by: Brixton North, Clapham East, Clapham Town, Stockwell East, Stockwell West and Larkhall
- GSS code: E05000425

Larkhall was an electoral ward in the London Borough of Lambeth, from 1965 to 2022. It was first used for the 1964 elections and last used for the 2018 elections. The boundaries of the ward were adjusted in 1978 and 2002. It returned three members to Lambeth London Borough Council. The ward was replaced by Brixton North, Clapham East, Clapham Town, Stockwell East and Stockwell West and Larkhall in 2022.

== List of councillors ==
Term	Councillor	Party
1964–1968	A. Crouch	Labour
1964–1968	G. Gold	Labour
1964–1968	W. King	Labour
1968–1971	D. Stephens	Conservative
1968–1971	Aurelia Young	Conservative
1968–1971	G. Pisani	Conservative
1971–1978	C. Blau	Labour
1971–1978	M. Kidd	Labour
1971–1978	EIsie Horstead	Labour
1978–1982	Sylvia Dimmick	Labour
1978–1982	Andrew Sawdon	Labour
1978–1985	Michael Bright	Labour
1982–1986	Kevin Moore	Labour
1982–1984	Andrew Keogh	Labour
1984–1986	Christine McGrory	Labour
1986–1990	Alison Higgs	Labour
1985–1990	Linda Bellos	Labour
1986–1994	Gregory Tucker	Labour
1990–1998	Elizabeth Tapsell	Labour
1990–1994	Joan Twelves	Labour
1994–1997	Margaret Jones	Labour
1994–1998	Maurice Cronly	Liberal Democrats
1997–2006	Kevin Craig	Labour
1998–2002	Rupert Bawden	Labour
1998–2002	Esther McCauley	Labour
2002–2006	Joanna Clason	Labour
2002–2006	Gary Follis	Labour
2006–2014	Peter Robbins	Labour
2006–2022	Tina Valcarcel	Labour
2006–2014	Neeraj Patil	Labour
2014–2022	Andy Wilson	Labour
2014–2018	Marsha de Cordova	Labour
2018–2022	Tim Windle	Labour

== Summary ==
Councillors elected by party at each general borough election.

- Labour
- Conservative
- Liberal Democrats

== 2002–2022 Lambeth council elections ==
There was a revision of ward boundaries in Lambeth in 2002.

=== 2018 election ===
The election took place on 3 May 2018.

2018 Lambeth London Borough Council election: Larkhall
Party	Candidate	Votes	%	±%
Labour	Tina Valcarcel	2,063	59.5	▲9.4
Labour	Andy Wilson	1,893		
Labour	Tim Windle	1,751		
Green	Colleen Campbell	513	13.6	▼1.4
Conservative	Thomas Mytton	501	14.2	▼2.2
Liberal Democrats	Malcolm Baines	492	12.6	▲4.6
Liberal Democrats	Vivienne Baines	458		
Conservative	Abiola Kingsley-Osaiga	455		
Green	Jo Parkes	415		
Conservative	Leila Abdi-Yaasen	411		
Green	Nick Hattersley	386		
Liberal Democrats	John Medway	354		
Total votes				
Labour hold		Swing		
Labour hold		Swing		
Labour hold		Swing		

=== 2014 election ===
The election took place on 22 May 2014.

2014 Lambeth London Borough Council election: Larkhall
Party	Candidate	Votes	%	±%
Labour	Marsha de Cordova	1,809		
Labour	Tina Valcarcel	1,651		
Labour	Andy Wilson	1,503		
Conservative	Victoria Lowe	651		
Conservative	Matthew Jupp	650		
Green	Lisa Perry	546		
Conservative	Alison Trelawny	517		
Green	Joe Dalton	492		
Green	Ciaran Osborne	431		
Liberal Democrats	Claire Church	329		
Liberal Democrats	Alistair Mills	271		
UKIP	Sean Marriott	265		
Liberal Democrats	Alistair MacDonald	216		
TUSC	Alexander Betteridge	100		
Socialist (GB)	Adam Buick	49		
Total votes				
Labour hold		Swing		
Labour hold		Swing		
Labour hold		Swing		

=== 2010 election ===
The election on 6 May 2010 took place on the same day as the United Kingdom general election.

2010 Lambeth London Borough Council election: Larkhall
Party	Candidate	Votes	%	±%
Labour	Peter Robbins	2,674		
Labour	Neeraj Patil	2,464		
Labour	Tina Valcarcel	2,344		
Liberal Democrats	Jessica David	1,538		
Liberal Democrats	Alistair Mills	1,330		
Conservative	Robert Harris	1,294		
Conservative	Sebastian Lowe	1,292		
Conservative	Alison Trelawny	1,206		
Liberal Democrats	Clive Parry	1,158		
Green	Jeffrey Dalton	674		
Green	William Webb	673		
Green	Sam Trice	409		
Socialist (GB)	Oliver Bond	48		
Socialist (GB)	Stanley Parker	46		
Socialist (GB)	Adam Buick	45		
Total votes		17,195		
Labour hold		Swing		
Labour hold		Swing		
Labour hold		Swing		

=== 2006 election ===
The election took place on 4 May 2006.

2006 Lambeth London Borough Council election: Larkhall
Party	Candidate	Votes	%	±%
Labour	Peter Robbins	1,341	49.0	
Labour	Tina Valcarcel	1,279		
Labour	Neeraj Patil	1,263		
Liberal Democrats	Roy Jenkins	476	17.4	
Conservative	Nicholas Maud	463	16.9	
Liberal Democrats	Laura Morland	459		
Liberal Democrats	Christopher Whitehouse	459		
Green	Helen Fensterheim	458	16.7	
Conservative	Charles Pender	440		
Conservative	William Trelawny	415		
Green	Noah Rutter	346		
Total votes		7,399		
Labour hold		Swing		
Labour hold		Swing		
Labour hold		Swing		

=== 2002 election ===
The election took place on 2 May 2002.

2002 Lambeth London Borough Council election: Larkhall
Party	Candidate	Votes	%	±%
Labour	Kevin Craig	1,307	19.7	
Labour	Joanna Clason	1,256	18.9	
Labour	Gary Follis	1,190	17.9	
Liberal Democrats	Monique Blythe	664	10.0	
Liberal Democrats	Rosario Munday	631	9.5	
Liberal Democrats	Scott McAusland	610	9.2	
Green	Sally Zlotowitz	260	3.9	
Conservative	Charles Crawford	203	3.1	
Conservative	Charles Pender	200	3.0	
Conservative	William Trelawny	196	3.0	
Socialist Alliance	Tina Humphries	127	1.9	
Turnout		6,644	22.2	
Labour win (new boundaries)				
Labour win (new boundaries)				
Labour win (new boundaries)				

== 1978–2002 Lambeth council elections ==
Larkhall ward boundaries from 1978 to 2002

There was a revision of ward boundaries in Lambeth in 1978.

=== 1998 election ===
The election took place on 7 May 1998.

1998 Lambeth London Borough Council election: Larkhall
Party	Candidate	Votes	%	±%
Turnout				
	Labour hold	Swing		
	Labour hold	Swing		
	Labour gain from Liberal Democrats	Swing		

=== 1997 by-election ===
The by-election took place on 1 May 1997, following the resignation of Margaret Jones.

1997 Larkhall by-election
Party	Candidate	Votes	%	±%
Labour	Kevin Craig	2,552	55.3	+8.2
Liberal Democrats	Jonathan Simpson	1,338	29.0	−12.4
Conservative	Caroline King	524	11.4	+1.8
Green	Roger Baker	200	4.3	+4.3
Majority		1,214	26.3	
Turnout		4,614	56.9	
Labour hold		Swing		

=== 1994 election ===
The election took place on 5 May 1994.

1994 Lambeth London Borough Council election: Larkhall
Party	Candidate	Votes	%	±%
Turnout				
	Labour hold	Swing		
	Labour hold	Swing		
	Liberal Democrats gain from Labour	Swing		

=== 1990 election ===
The election took place on 3 May 1990.

1990 Lambeth London Borough Council election: Larkhall
Party	Candidate	Votes	%	±%
Turnout				
	Labour hold	Swing		
	Labour hold	Swing		
	Labour hold	Swing		

=== 1986 election ===
The election took place on 8 May 1986.

1986 Lambeth London Borough Council election: Larkhall
Party	Candidate	Votes	%	±%
Turnout				
	Labour hold	Swing		
	Labour hold	Swing		
	Labour hold	Swing		

=== 1985 by-election ===
The by-election took place on 1 August 1985, following the resignation of Michael Bright.

1985 Larkhall by-election
Party	Candidate	Votes	%	±%
Labour	Linda Bellos	1,708		
Alliance	Paul Wilce	909		
Conservative	Simon Hooberman	298		
Turnout				
Labour hold		Swing		

=== 1984 by-election ===
The by-election took place on 22 November 1984, following the resignation of Andrew Keogh.

1984 Larkhall by-election
Party	Candidate	Votes	%	±%
Labour	Christine McGrory	980		
Conservative	Neil Cameron	347		
Alliance	Inigo Bing	230		
Turnout				
Labour hold		Swing		

=== 1982 election ===
The election took place on 6 May 1982.

1982 Lambeth London Borough Council election: Larkhall
Party	Candidate	Votes	%	±%
Turnout				
	Labour hold	Swing		
	Labour hold	Swing		
	Labour hold	Swing		

=== 1978 election ===
The election took place on 4 May 1978.

1978 Lambeth London Borough Council election: Larkhall
Party	Candidate	Votes	%	±%
Turnout				
	Labour win (new boundaries)			
	Labour win (new boundaries)			
	Labour win (new boundaries)			

== 1964–1978 Lambeth council elections ==
=== 1974 election ===
The election took place on 2 May 1974.

1974 Lambeth London Borough Council election: Larkhall
Party	Candidate	Votes	%	±%
Labour	C. Blau	1,392		
Labour	M. Kidd	1,336		
Labour	Elsie Horstead	1,334		
Conservative	J. Stocker	578		
Conservative	J. Waghorn	544		
Conservative	G. Lyes	540		
Liberal	W. Bennett	334		
Liberal	C. Kerrighen	324		
Liberal	J. Wingrave	309		
Total votes				
Labour hold		Swing		
Labour hold		Swing		
Labour hold		Swing		

=== 1971 election ===
The election took place on 13 May 1971.

1971 Lambeth London Borough Council election: Larkhall
Party	Candidate	Votes	%	±%
Labour	C. Blau	2,549	24.9%	
Labour	M. Kidd	2,481	24.2%	
Labour	EIsie Horstead	2,450	23.9%	
Conservative	R. Hickman	836	8.2%	
Conservative	D. Powell	815	8.0%	
Conservative	D. Stephens	800	7.8%	
Communist	S. Hope	101	1.0%	
Liberal	W. Bennett	79	0.8%	
Liberal	D. Sandford	73	0.7%	
Liberal	W. Woodward	67	0.7%	
Turnout		10,251		
Labour gain from Conservative				
Labour gain from Conservative				
Labour gain from Conservative				

=== 1968 election ===
The election took place on 9 May 1968.

1968 Lambeth London Borough Council election: Larkhall
Party	Candidate	Votes	%	±%
Conservative	D. Stephens	1,506		
Conservative	Aurelia Young	1,500		
Conservative	G. Pisani	1,489		
Labour	D. Speakman	1,489		
Labour	W. King	1,177		
Labour	S. Parry	1,154		
Communist	S. Hope	198		
Turnout				
Conservative gain from Labour		Swing		
Conservative gain from Labour		Swing		
Conservative gain from Labour		Swing		

=== 1964 election ===
The election took place on 7 May 1964.

1964 Lambeth London Borough Council election: Larkhall
Party	Candidate	Votes	%	±%
Labour	A. Crouch	1,901	69.0	
Labour	G. Gold	1,875	68.1	
Labour	W. King	1,861	67.5	
Conservative	J. Chambers	774	28.1	
Conservative	John Major	752	27.3	
Conservative	E. Brady	740	26.9	
Communist	S. Hope	107	3.9	
Independent	P. Winchester	77	2.8	
Turnout		2,755	24.5	
Labour win (new seat)				
Labour win (new seat)				
Labour win (new seat)				
