= List of Liberal Democrat MPs in London =

The Liberal Democrats currently have six MPs representing a United Kingdom constituency in London, as of the 2024 United Kingdom general election.

== Members of Parliament since 2024 election ==
MP	Constituency	Borough parties	Majority	Majority (%)
Paul Kohler	Wimbledon	Merton Liberal Democrats	12,610	22.9%
Bobby Dean	Carshalton and Wallington	Sutton Liberal Democrats	7,905	16.9%
Luke Taylor	Sutton and Cheam	Sutton Liberal Democrats	3,801	8.0%
Sarah Olney	Richmond Park	Richmond Liberal Democrats	17,155	33.3%
Munira Wilson	Twickenham	Richmond Liberal Democrats	21,457	40.0%
Ed Davey	Kingston and Surbiton	Kingston upon Thames Liberal Democrats	17,235	34.1%

== Members of Parliament (2019–2024) ==
MP	Constituency	Borough parties	Majority	Majority (%)
Sarah Olney	Richmond Park	Richmond Liberal Democrats	7,766	11.9%
Munira Wilson	Twickenham	Richmond Liberal Democrats	14,121	21.9%
Ed Davey	Kingston and Surbiton	Kingston upon Thames Liberal Democrats	10,489	17.2%

== Members of Parliament (2017–2019) ==
MP	Constituency	Borough Parties	Majority	Majority (%)
Tom Brake	Carshalton and Wallington	Sutton Liberal Democrats	1,369	2.7%
Vince Cable	Twickenham	Richmond Liberal Democrats	9,762	14.7%%
Ed Davey	Kingston and Surbiton	Kingston upon Thames Liberal Democrats	4,124	6.6%
Chuka Umunna (elected Labour)	Streatham	Streatham Liberal Democrats	26,285	68.5%

== Members of Parliament (2015–2017) ==
MP	Constituency	Borough Parties
Tom Brake	Carshalton and Wallington	Sutton Liberal Democrats

== Members of Parliament (2010–2015) ==
MP	Constituency	Borough Parties
Paul Burstow	Sutton and Cheam	Sutton Liberal Democrats
Tom Brake	Carshalton and Wallington	Sutton Liberal Democrats
Vincent Cable	Twickenham	Richmond Liberal Democrats
Edward Davey	Kingston and Surbiton	Kingston upon Thames Liberal Democrats
Lynne Featherstone	Hornsey and Wood Green	Haringey Liberal Democrats
Simon Hughes	Bermondsey and Old Southwark	Southwark Liberal Democrats
Sarah Teather	Brent Central	Brent Liberal Democrats

== Members of Parliament (2005–2010) ==
MP	Constituency	Borough Parties
Paul Burstow	Sutton and Cheam	Sutton Liberal Democrats
Tom Brake	Carshalton and Wallington	Sutton Liberal Democrats
Vincent Cable	Twickenham	Richmond Liberal Democrats
Edward Davey	Kingston and Surbiton	Kingston upon Thames Liberal Democrats
Lynne Featherstone	Hornsey and Wood Green	Haringey Liberal Democrats
Simon Hughes	Bermondsey and Old Southwark	Southwark Liberal Democrats
Susan Kramer	Richmond Park	Richmond Liberal Democrats
Sarah Teather	Brent South	Brent Liberal Democrats

== Members of Parliament (2001–2005) ==
MP	Constituency	Borough Parties
Paul Burstow	Sutton and Cheam	Sutton Liberal Democrats
Tom Brake	Carshalton and Wallington	Sutton Liberal Democrats
Vincent Cable	Twickenham	Richmond Liberal Democrats
Edward Davey	Kingston and Surbiton	Kingston upon Thames Liberal Democrats
Simon Hughes	Bermondsey and Old Southwark	Southwark Liberal Democrats
Jenny Tonge	Richmond Park	Richmond Liberal Democrats

== Members of Parliament (1997–2001) ==
MP	Constituency	Borough Parties
Paul Burstow	Sutton and Cheam	Sutton Liberal Democrats
Tom Brake	Carshalton and Wallington	Sutton Liberal Democrats
Vincent Cable	Twickenham	Richmond Liberal Democrats
Edward Davey	Kingston and Surbiton	Kingston upon Thames Liberal Democrats
Simon Hughes	Bermondsey and Old Southwark	Southwark Liberal Democrats
Jenny Tonge	Richmond Park	Richmond Liberal Democrats

== See also ==
- List of parliamentary constituencies in London
- List of Conservative Party MPs in London
- List of Labour Party MPs in London
