= Tom Cox (British politician) =

British politician (1930–2018)

Member of Parliament for Tooting (Wandsworth Central 1970–1974)
- In office 18 June 1970 – 11 April 2005
- Preceded by: David Kerr
- Succeeded by: Sadiq Khan

Personal details
- Born: 19 January 1930 London, England
- Died: 2 August 2018 (aged 88)
- Party: Labour
- Education: London School of Economics

Thomas Michael Cox (19 January 1930 – 2 August 2018) was a British politician who was the Member of Parliament (MP) for Wandsworth Central from 1970 to 1974 and then for Tooting until 2005. He was a member of the Labour Party.

== Early life ==
Cox was educated at a state school and the London School of Economics after which, according to his entry in Who's Who, he became an "electrical worker".

== Political career ==
He served as an alderman of Fulham Borough Council from 1960 to 1965, and as a Councillor for Halford Ward on the London Borough of Hammersmith and Fulham from 1964 to 1967, as well as serving on the Inner London Education Authority.

Before being elected for Wandsworth Central in 1970, he had stood unsuccessfully for Stroud in 1966. He served as a whip in the Wilson and Callaghan Governments. He lived in Southfields in the London Borough of Wandsworth.

Parliament of the United Kingdom
Preceded by David Kerr	Member of Parliament for Wandsworth Central; 1970–1974	Succeeded by Constituency Abolished
Preceded by Constituency Created	Member of Parliament for Tooting; 1974–2005	Succeeded by Sadiq Khan
