= Tooting Bec =

Coordinates: 51.4286°N 0.1666°W

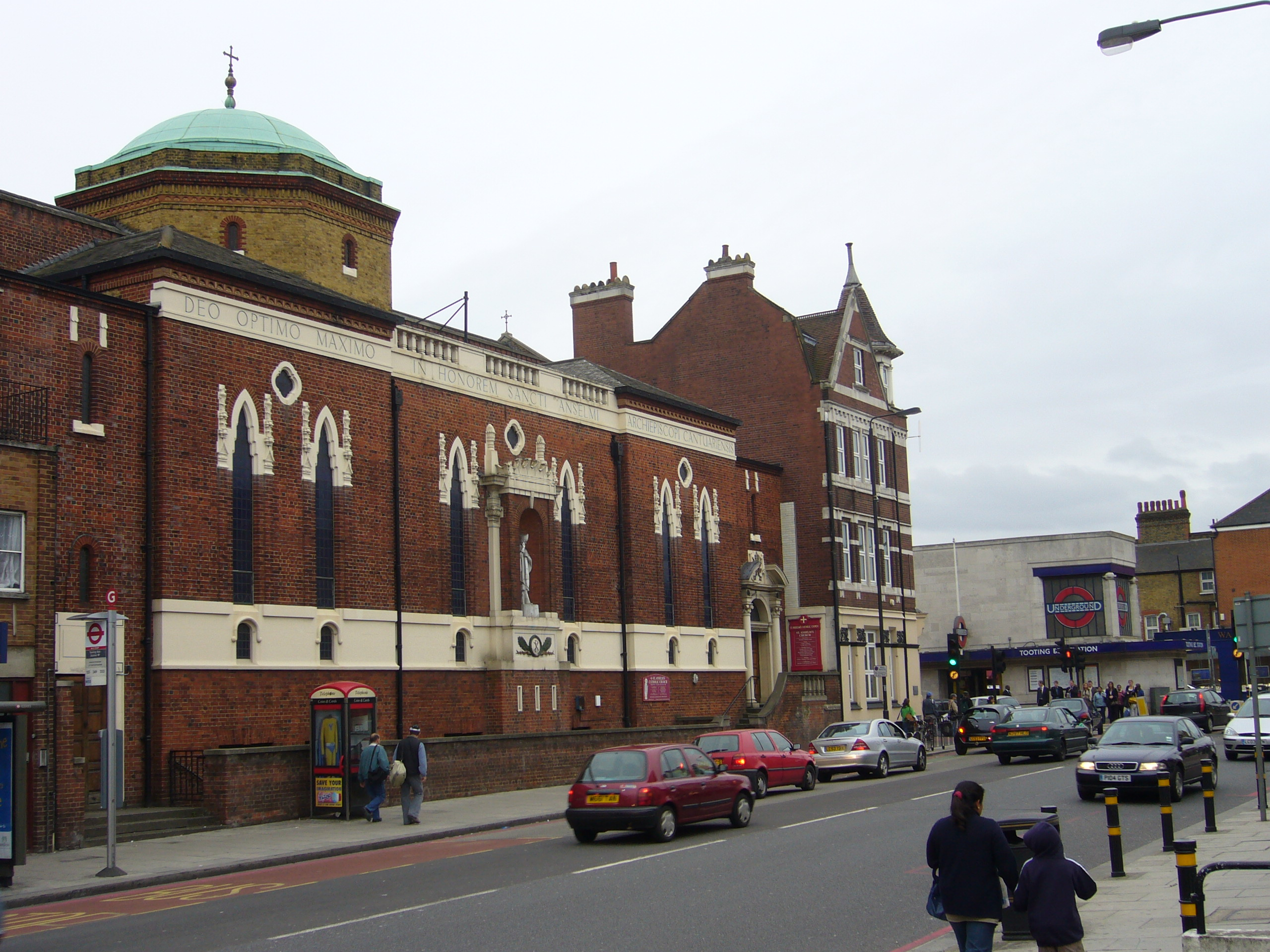
- St Anselm's Church and the tube station

- Location within Greater London
- OS grid reference: TQ275715
- London borough: Wandsworth
- Ceremonial county: Greater London
- Region: London
- Country: England
- Sovereign state: United Kingdom
- Post town: LONDON
- Postcode district: SW17
- Dialling code: 020
- Police: Metropolitan
- Fire: London
- Ambulance: London
- UK Parliament: Tooting
- London Assembly: Merton and Wandsworth

Tooting Bec is in the London Borough of Wandsworth, south London, England.

== History ==
Tooting Bec appears in Domesday Book of 1086 as "Totinges". It was held partly by St Mary de Bec-Hellouin Abbey and partly by Westminster Abbey. Its domesday assets were: 5 hides. It had 5½ ploughs, 13 acres (5.3 ha). It rendered £7.

'Bec' (beck, meaning 'stream' in English) was added after Bec Abbey in Normandy ('Bec' being the name of the river there). They were given land in the area by the Normans. Saint Anselm, the second Abbot of Bec, is reputed to have been a visitor to Tooting Bec before he succeeded Lanfranc as Archbishop of Canterbury. Saint Anselm also gives his name to the Roman Catholic church at the corner of Balham High Road and Tooting Bec Road. A relief sculpture of Saint Anselm visiting the Totinges tribe (from which Tooting gets its name) is on the exterior of Wandsworth Town Hall.

Tooting Bec is on Stane Street, a Roman Road which linked London with Chichester to the southwest.

The area includes Tooting Commons, and Tooting Bec Lido, one of the oldest open-air fresh water swimming pools in Britain, first opened to the public in 1906, and also the largest freshwater swimming pool by surface area in the United Kingdom, being 100 yards (91.44 m) long and 33 yards (30.18 m) wide.

Tooting Bec Golf Club was founded in 1888. The club disappeared in the late 1920s.

The Finnish band Hanoi Rocks wrote the song "Tooting Bec Wreck" about their experiences living there in the early 1980s.

== Governance ==
Tooting Bec is part of the Tooting constituency for elections to the House of Commons of the United Kingdom.

Tooting Bec is covered by the Tooting Bec ward for elections to Wandsworth London Borough Council.

== Nearest places ==
- Tooting
- Balham
- Streatham
- Wimbledon
- Earlsfield
- Mitcham
- Colliers Wood
- Furzedown

== Nearest tube station ==
- Tooting Bec tube station

== Football Club ==
- Tooting Bec F.C.
