= 1886 Battersea by-election =

UK parliamentary by-election

The 1886 Battersea by-election was held on 1 March 1886 after the incumbent Liberal MP, Octavius Vaughan Morgan resigned to seek re-election to pre-empt disqualification. He was returned unopposed.

At the 1885 general election Morgan was elected as a Member of Parliament (MP) for Battersea. His right to sit was questioned in 1886, as his family company Morgan Crucible held government contracts, from which he had disassociated himself before his nomination. Morgan took the Manor of Northstead to resign from Parliament until the question was settled, and was returned unopposed at the ensuing by-election in March 1886. He held the seat at the general election in July 1886, and sat for Battersea until 1892.

1886 Battersea by-election
Party	Candidate	Votes	%	±%
Liberal	Octavius Morgan	Unopposed		
Registered electors		10,019		
Liberal hold				
