= Adrian Flook =

British politician

Member of Parliament for Taunton
- In office 7 June 2001 – 11 April 2005
- Preceded by: Jackie Ballard
- Succeeded by: Jeremy Browne

Personal details
- Born: 9 July 1963 (age 62)
- Party: Conservative
- Spouse: Frangelica O'Shea

Adrian John Flook (born 9 July 1963) is a British Conservative politician, and a former Member of Parliament (MP).

== Early life ==
Flook was educated at King Edward School, Bath and Mansfield College, Oxford where he studied (BA) Modern History. He was a stockbroker from 1985 to 1998, working first for UBS Warburg and then for Société Générale. From 1998 to 2002 he worked as a consultant for Financial Dynamics.

== Parliamentary career ==
At the 1997 general election, he stood unsuccessfully in the safe Labour Party constituency of Pontefract and Castleford.

At the 2001 general election, he was elected as MP for Taunton, taking the traditionally Conservative seat that had been captured by the Liberal Democrat Jackie Ballard at the 1997 election. Flook's victory in Taunton was one of just nine total gains made by the Conservative Party at the 2001 General Election where, under William Hague's leadership, the Party made a net gain of just one seat in the House of Commons. The seat of Taunton was high on the Conservative Party's target list, receiving a visit from Hague himself on the first day of the campaign. Flook served only one term, losing his seat at the 2005 election to the Liberal Democrat Jeremy Browne. While in Parliament he served on the Select committee on Culture, Media and Sport.

== After Parliament ==
Flook worked for the public relations firm M: Communications, where he has performed pro bono work on behalf of the so-called NatWest Three. Currently, he works as a Consultant for C|T|F Partners. He is a national patron of domestic violence charity ManKind Initiative. He was then elected to Wandsworth Council for the ward of Wandsworth Common in the 2018 local election. Flook subsequently stood and lost in Wandle ward in the 2022 elections.

== Personal life ==
He married Frangelica O'Shea in 2003. Their daughter, Clementine Alexia, was born in 2005.

Parliament of the United Kingdom
Preceded by Jackie Ballard	Member of Parliament for Taunton; 2001–2005	Succeeded by Jeremy Browne
