= Tooting Broadway (ward) =

Electoral ward in the London Borough of Wandsworth

- Electoral ward for the Wandsworth London Borough Council
- Tooting Broadway ward boundaries since 2022
- Borough: Wandsworth
- County: Greater London
- Population: 17,217 (2021) (Note: 2021 Census data reported for 2022 ward boundaries)
- Electorate: 11,923 (2022)
- Area: 1.626 square kilometres (0.628 sq mi)

Current electoral ward
- Created: 2022
- Councillors: 3
- GSS code: E05014024

Tooting Broadway is an electoral ward in the London Borough of Wandsworth. The ward was first used in the 2022 elections. It returns three councillors to Wandsworth London Borough Council.

== List of councillors ==
Term	Councillor	Party
2022–2024	Kate Forbes	Labour
2022	Andy Gibbons	Labour
2022–present	Kemi Akinola	Labour
2022–present	Rex Osborn	Labour
2024–present	Sean Lawless	Labour

== Wandsworth council elections ==
=== 2024 by-election ===
The by-election took place on 18 January 2024, following the resignation of Kate Forbes.

2024 Tooting Broadway by-election
Party	Candidate	Votes	%	±%
Labour	Sean Lawless	1,888	67.3	+6.7
Conservative	Otto Jacobsson	542	19.3	+0.8
Green	Nick Humberstone	261	9.3	–5.6
Liberal Democrats	Thillainathan Haren	113	4.0	–2.0
Majority		1,346	48.0	
Turnout		1,804		
Labour hold		Swing	▲3.0	

=== 2022 by-election ===
The by-election took place on 14 July 2022, following the death of Andy Gibbons.

2022 Tooting Broadway by-election
Party	Candidate	Votes	%	±%
Labour	Rex Osborn	1,429	62	
Conservative	Jonathon Iliff	491	21	
Green	Lisa Osborne	289	12	
Liberal Democrats	Thillainathan Haren	94	4	
Majority		938		
Turnout		2,299		
Labour hold		Swing		

=== 2022 election ===
The election took place on 5 May 2022.

2022 Wandsworth London Borough Council election: Tooting Broadway
Party	Candidate	Votes	%	±%
Labour	Kate Forbes	2,773	67.9	
Labour	Kemi Akinola	2,762	67.6	
Labour	Andy Gibbons	2,339	57.3	
Conservative	Gerald Brent	849	20.8	
Conservative	Neil Caddy	768	18.8	
Conservative	James McLoughlin	754	18.5	
Green	Tom Fitzhardinge	680	16.7	
Liberal Democrats	Catie Tuttle	277	6.8	
Liberal Democrats	Stephen Bieniek	272	6.7	
Liberal Democrats	Simon Sharich	195	4.8	
Turnout		4,083		
Labour win (new seat)				
Labour win (new seat)				
Labour win (new seat)				
