= Jane Ellison =

British Conservative Party politician (born 1964)

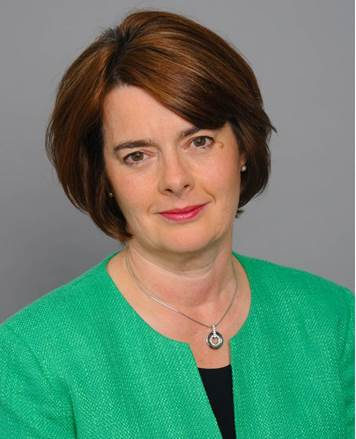
- Ellison in 2015

Financial Secretary to the Treasury
- In office 15 July 2016 – 8 June 2017
- Prime Minister: Theresa May
- Preceded by: David Gauke
- Succeeded by: Mel Stride

Parliamentary Under-Secretary of State for Public Health
- In office 7 October 2013 – 15 July 2016
- Prime Minister: David Cameron
- Preceded by: Anna Soubry
- Succeeded by: David Mowat

Member of Parliament for Battersea
- In office 7 May 2010 – 3 May 2017
- Preceded by: Martin Linton
- Succeeded by: Marsha de Cordova

Personal details
- Born: 15 August 1964 (age 62) Bradford, England
- Party: Conservative
- Education: St Hilda's College, Oxford
- Website: Official website

Jane Elizabeth Ellison (born 15 August 1964) is a British United Nations official and former politician. A member of the Conservative Party, she was first elected at the 2010 general election as the Member of Parliament for Battersea. On 7 May 2015, she was re-elected with an increased margin of 3.4%. She lost the seat to Marsha de Cordova of the Labour Party at the 2017 snap general election. In November 2017 she joined the senior leadership team of the World Health Organization serving until November 2022.

== Early life and career ==
Ellison was born in Bradford, attending St. Joseph's Catholic College, Bradford, then a girls' grammar school. She studied Philosophy, Politics and Economics at St Hilda's College, Oxford. After university, she worked at the John Lewis Partnership, where she held many positions up until her election to the House of Commons some 23 years later.

A former Barnet London Borough Councillor, she contested the 1996 Barnsley East by-election and the 2000 Tottenham by-election, in both cases finishing in third place, and contested Barnsley East and Mexborough in 1997 and Pendle in the 2005 general election. Labour retained the seat, although she almost halved the majority of sitting MP Gordon Prentice from 4,275 to 2,180.

She was selected as the prospective parliamentary candidate for Battersea in September 2006, following an open primary held at the Battersea Arts Centre.

== Parliamentary career ==
Ellison was elected at the 2010 general election, with a majority of 5,977. In Parliament, she served on the Backbench Business Committee and Work and Pensions Committee. In 2011 she founded the first All Party Parliamentary Group on Female Genital Mutilation (FGM), speaking regularly on the issue in Parliament.

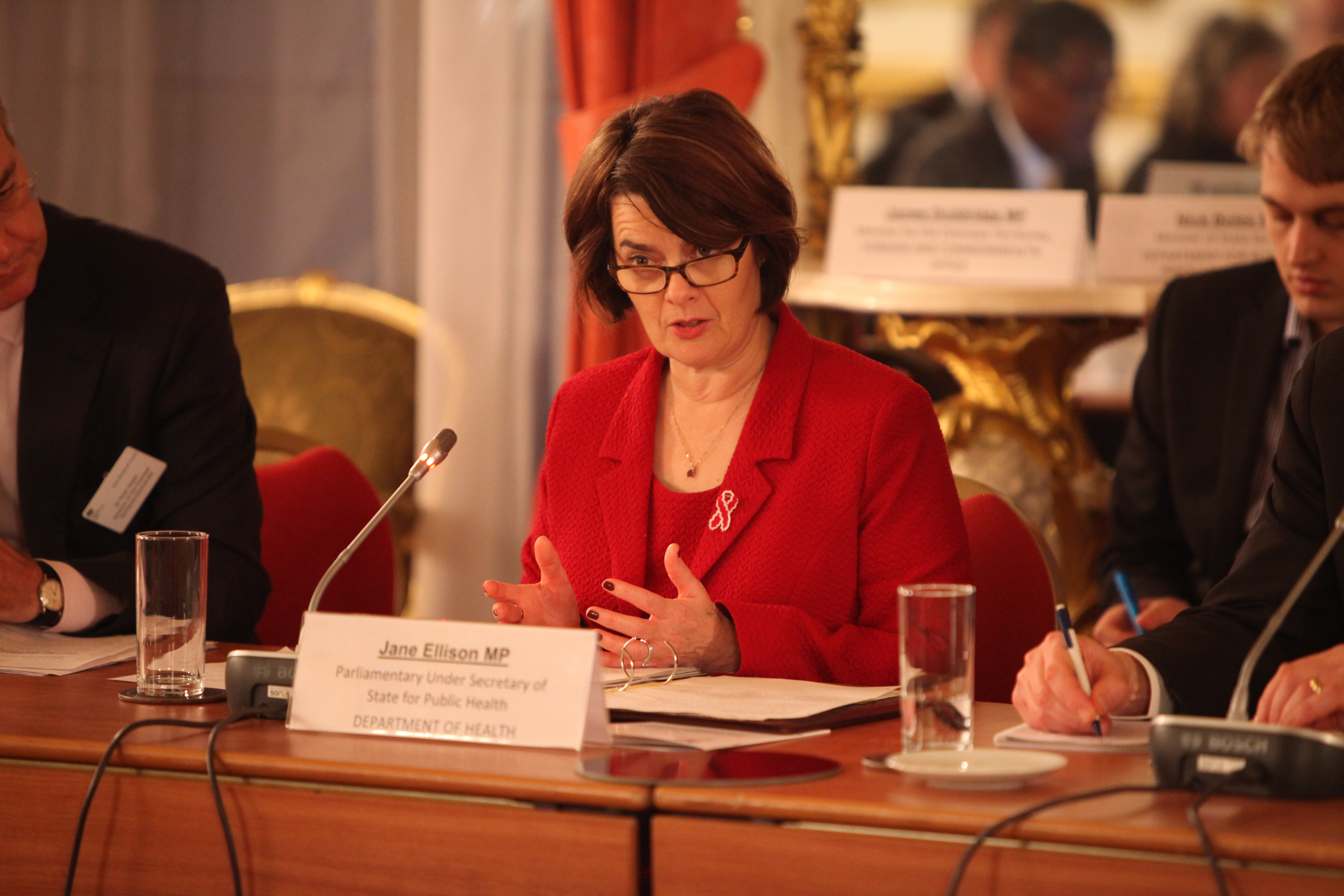
Ellison speaks at the Overseas Territories Joint Ministerial Council meeting in London on 1 December 2015.

Ellison was appointed Parliamentary Under-Secretary of State for Public Health in October 2013. She continued her interest in FGM, bringing forward a number of measures aimed at ending the practise during her time as a Minister. She described providing political direction to the National Health Service (NHS) as "a bit like being on a high wire without a net at times, it can be quite exciting" in a meeting with the Tory Reform Group in 2014.

According to The Observer, she also said: "I don't know how much any of you realise that with the Lansley act we pretty much gave away control of the NHS… we have some important strategic mechanisms but we don't really have day-to-day control", which was seized upon by critics as evidence that the government's NHS reforms had not succeeded.

In January 2015, Ellison announced the government was proposing introducing a ban on advertising on cigarette packaging before the next election, and the standardised packaging of cigarettes legislation passed the House of Commons in March 2015. After a Parliamentary debate in February 2015, Ellison signed the Mitochondrial Donation Regulations on 4 March making the UK the first country in the world to legislate for the procedure.

Following the EU Referendum in which she campaigned for Remain Ellison was appointed Financial Secretary to the Treasury in July 2016 and in August 2016 she announced that the Government would be proceeding with the Soft Drinks Industry Levy, also known as the sugar tax.

== After politics ==
In October 2017, Ellison was appointed as Deputy Director-General for Corporate Operations at the World Health Organization under the leadership of Director General Tedros Adhanom Ghebreyesus. On 6 March 2019 as part of a wider programme of reorganization she became the Executive Director for External Relations and Governance at WHO. She left the WHO in November 2022 when there were a number of changes in the senior leadership team.

== Other activities ==
- World Health Summit (WHS), Member of the 2022 Steering Committee

== Personal life ==
Ellison lives in Balham with her partner John, and enjoys music and walking.

Parliament of the United Kingdom
Preceded by Martin Linton	Member of Parliament for Battersea; 2010–2017	Succeeded by Marsha de Cordova
