= Tooting Bec (ward) =

Electoral ward in London, England

- Electoral ward for the Wandsworth London Borough Council
- Borough: London Borough of Wandsworth
- County: Greater London
- Population: 17,028 (2021)
- Major settlements: Tooting Bec
- Area: 1.478 km²

Current electoral ward
- Created: 2022
- Seats: 3

Tooting Bec is an electoral ward in the London Borough of Wandsworth. The ward was first used in the 2022 elections and elects three councillors to Wandsworth London Borough Council.

== Geography ==
The ward is based on the suburb of Tooting Bec.

== Councillors ==
| Election | Councillors | | |
|---|---|---|---|
| 2022 | Sheila Boswell (Labour) | Annamarie Critchard (Labour) | Paul White (Labour) |

== Elections ==
=== 2022 ===
Tooting Bec (3)
| Party | Candidate | Votes | % |
|---|---|---|---|
| Labour | Sheila Boswell | 2,787 | 62.1 |
| Labour | Annamarie Critchard | 2,759 | 61.4 |
| Labour | Paul White | 2,258 | 50.3 |
| Conservative | Jonathan Styles | 1,073 | 23.9 |
| Conservative | Mike Pautsch | 1,061 | 23.6 |
| Conservative | Mozes Megyesi | 1,041 | 23.2 |
| Green | Lisa Osborne | 695 | 15.5 |
| Green | Steve Jones | 536 | 11.9 |
| Liberal Democrats | Lara Fiorani | 400 | 8.9 |
| Liberal Democrats | David Elliott | 268 | 6.0 |
| Liberal Democrats | Maltby Pindar | 189 | 4.2 |
| Turnout | | 4,491 | 37.0 |
| Labour win (new seat) | | | |
| Labour win (new seat) | | | |
| Labour win (new seat) | | | |

== See also ==
- List of electoral wards in Greater London
