= Falconbrook (ward) =

Electoral ward in the London Borough of Wandsworth

- Electoral ward for the Wandsworth London Borough Council
- Borough: London Borough of Wandsworth
- County: Greater London
- Population: 11,982 (2021)
- Major settlements: Falconbrook
- Area: 0.7361 km²

Current electoral ward
- Created: 2022
- Seats: 2

Falconbrook is an electoral ward in the London Borough of Wandsworth. The ward was first used in the 2022 elections and elects two councillors to Wandsworth London Borough Council.

== Geography ==
The ward is named after the Falconbrook.

== Councillors ==
Election	Councillors	
2022	Kate Stock (Labour)	Simon Hogg (Labour)

== Elections ==
=== 2022 ===
Falconbrook (2)
Party	Candidate	Votes	%
Labour	Kate Stock	1,607	68.9
Labour	Simon Hogg	1,603	68.8
Conservative	Andrew Mitchell	607	26.0
Conservative	Jasmine Rahman	557	23.9
TUSC	Kim Hendry	120	5.1
Turnout		2,331	30.5
Labour win (new seat)			
Labour win (new seat)			

== See also ==
- List of electoral wards in Greater London
