= Marsha de Cordova =

British politician (born 1976)

Marsha de Cordova MP
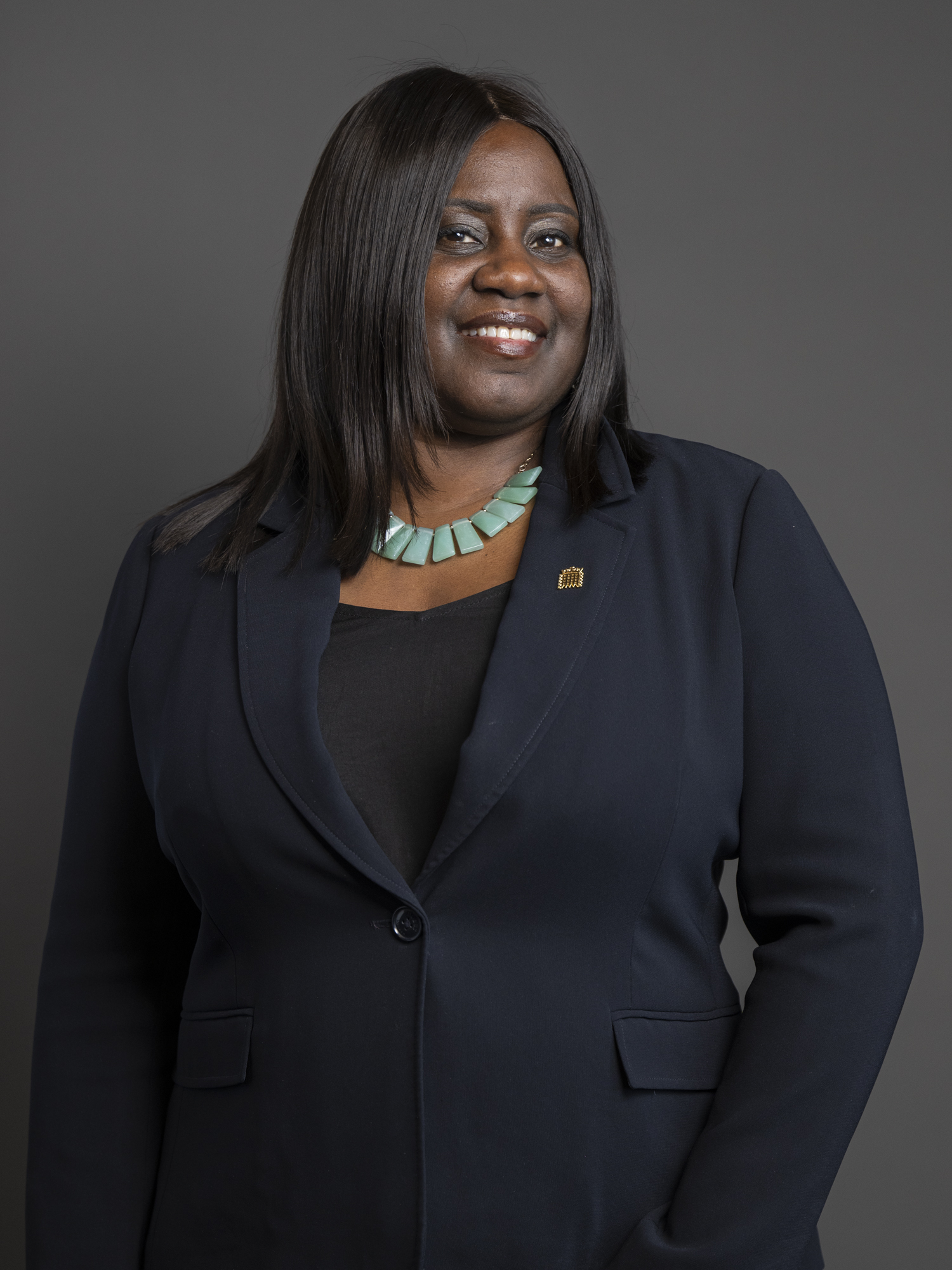
- Official portrait, 2024

Second Church Estates Commissioner
- Incumbent
- Assumed office 7 October 2024
- Prime Minister: Keir Starmer; Andy Burnham
- Preceded by: Andrew Selous

Member of Parliament for Battersea
- Incumbent
- Assumed office 8 June 2017
- Preceded by: Jane Ellison
- Majority: 12,039 (25.6%)
Shadow portfolios
Shadow Secretary of State
2020–2021	Women and Equalities
Shadow Minister
2017–2020	Disabled People

Member of Lambeth Council for Larkhall
- In office 22 May 2014 – 3 May 2018

Personal details
- Born: Marsha Chantal de Cordova; 23 January 1976 (age 50) Bristol, England
- Party: Labour
- Other political affiliations: Socialist Campaign Group
- Relations: Bobby De Cordova-Reid (brother)
- Education: London South Bank University (LLB)
- Website: marshadecordova.co.uk

Marsha Chantal de Cordova (born 23 January 1976) is a British politician and former charity worker serving as Member of Parliament (MP) for Battersea since 2017. A member of the Labour Party, she was a Member of Lambeth London Borough Council from 2014 to 2018. Since 2024, De Cordova has served as Second Church Estates Commissioner. On the political left, she is a member of the Socialist Campaign Group.

De Cordova served in the Shadow Cabinet of Keir Starmer as Shadow Secretary of State for Women and Equalities from 2020 to 2021.

== Early life and education ==
Marsha Chantal de Cordova was born on 23 January 1976 in Bristol, England. She has five siblings, one of whom is professional footballer Bobby De Cordova-Reid. She was born with nystagmus and is registered blind. De Cordova attended Hanham High School (now Hanham Woods Academy).

De Cordova studied Law and European Policy Studies at London South Bank University. After graduating she worked at a number of charities including Action for Blind People before founding the charity South East London Vision in 2014.

Prior to becoming an MP, de Cordova was the engagement and advocacy director at the charity, Thomas Pocklington Trust.

== Political career ==
De Cordova was elected as a Labour Party councillor for the Larkhall ward on Lambeth Council in 2014.

She was elected as MP for Battersea in the 2017 general election. It was previously held by Conservative politician Jane Ellison since 2010.

De Cordova was appointed as the Shadow Minister for Disabled People on 9 October 2017, replacing Marie Rimmer. She was promoted to Shadow Secretary of State for Women and Equalities by new Labour leader, Keir Starmer, replacing Dawn Butler.

As an MP, she has been involved in campaigning to make the Parliamentary Estate more accessible for disabled people.

In May 2021, alongside celebrities and other public figures, de Cordova was a signatory to an open letter from the magazine Stylist, which called on the government to address what it described as an "epidemic of male violence" by funding an "ongoing, high-profile, expert-informed awareness campaign on men's violence against women and girls".

In August 2021, de Cordova was criticised for not attending an annual Stonewall event about the Labour Party and LGBT+ rights due to "diary clashes". She was the first shadow equalities secretary to not attend the event since it was created.

De Cordova resigned from her post as shadow equalities secretary in September 2021 in order to focus on her marginal constituency of Battersea.

She was appointed Second Church Estates Commissioner, responsible for representing the Church Commissioners in Parliament and in the General Synod of the Church of England, on 7 October 2024.

Parliament of the United Kingdom
Preceded by Jane Ellison	Member of Parliament for Battersea; 2017–present	Incumbent
