= Wandle (Wandsworth ward) =

Electoral ward in the London Borough of Wandsworth

- Electoral ward for the Wandsworth London Borough Council
- Borough: London Borough of Wandsworth
- County: Greater London
- Population: 10,585 (2021)
- Area: 0.8393 km²

Current electoral ward
- Created: 2022
- Seats: 2

Wandle is an electoral ward in the London Borough of Wandsworth. The ward was first used in the 2022 elections and elects two councillors to Wandsworth London Borough Council.

== Geography ==
The ward is named after the Wandle Trail.

== Councillors ==
Election	Councillors	
2022	Denise Paul (Labour)	Sarmila Varatharaj (Labour)
2026	Chris Baron (conservative)	Denise Paul (Labour)

== Elections ==
=== 2022 ===
Wandle (2)
Party	Candidate	Votes	%
Labour	Denise Paul	1,750	49.0
Labour	Sarmila Varatharaj	1,668	46.7
Conservative	Siôn Davies	1,456	40.7
Conservative	Adrian Flook	1,435	40.2
Green	Márcia Goodwin	311	8.7
Liberal Democrats	Duncan Lyons	215	6.0
Green	Stephen Midlane	172	4.8
Turnout		3,574	47.5
Labour win (new seat)			
Labour win (new seat)			

== See also ==
- List of electoral wards in Greater London
