= Battersea Park (ward) =

Electoral ward in the London Borough of Wandsworth

- Electoral ward for the Wandsworth London Borough Council
- Borough: London Borough of Wandsworth
- County: Greater London
- Population: 19,176 (2021)
- Major settlements: Battersea Park
- Area: 1.878 km²

Current electoral ward
- Created: 2022
- Seats: 3

Battersea Park is an electoral ward in the London Borough of Wandsworth. The ward was first used in the 2022 elections and elects three councillors to Wandsworth London Borough Council.

== Geography ==
The ward is named after Battersea Park.

== Councillors ==
Election	Councillors		
2022	Juliana Annan (Labour)	Tony Belton (Labour)	Maurice McLeod (Labour)

== Elections ==
=== 2022 ===
Battersea Park (3)
Party	Candidate	Votes	%
Labour	Juliana Annan	1,991	47.7
Labour	Tony Belton	1,975	47.3
Labour	Maurice McLeod	1,760	42.2
Conservative	Rory Manley	1,404	33.6
Conservative	Sami Abouzahra	1,355	32.5
Conservative	Mariette Miemietz	1,280	30.7
Green	Isabel Losada	689	16.5
Green	Emma Buckley	557	13.3
Liberal Democrats	Teresa Norman	396	9.5
Liberal Democrats	Petri Vitiello	240	5.8
Independent	Shaun O'Mara	106	2.5
Turnout		4,173	32.6
Labour win (new seat)			
Labour win (new seat)			
Labour win (new seat)			

== See also ==
- List of electoral wards in Greater London
