= Martin Linton =

British politician

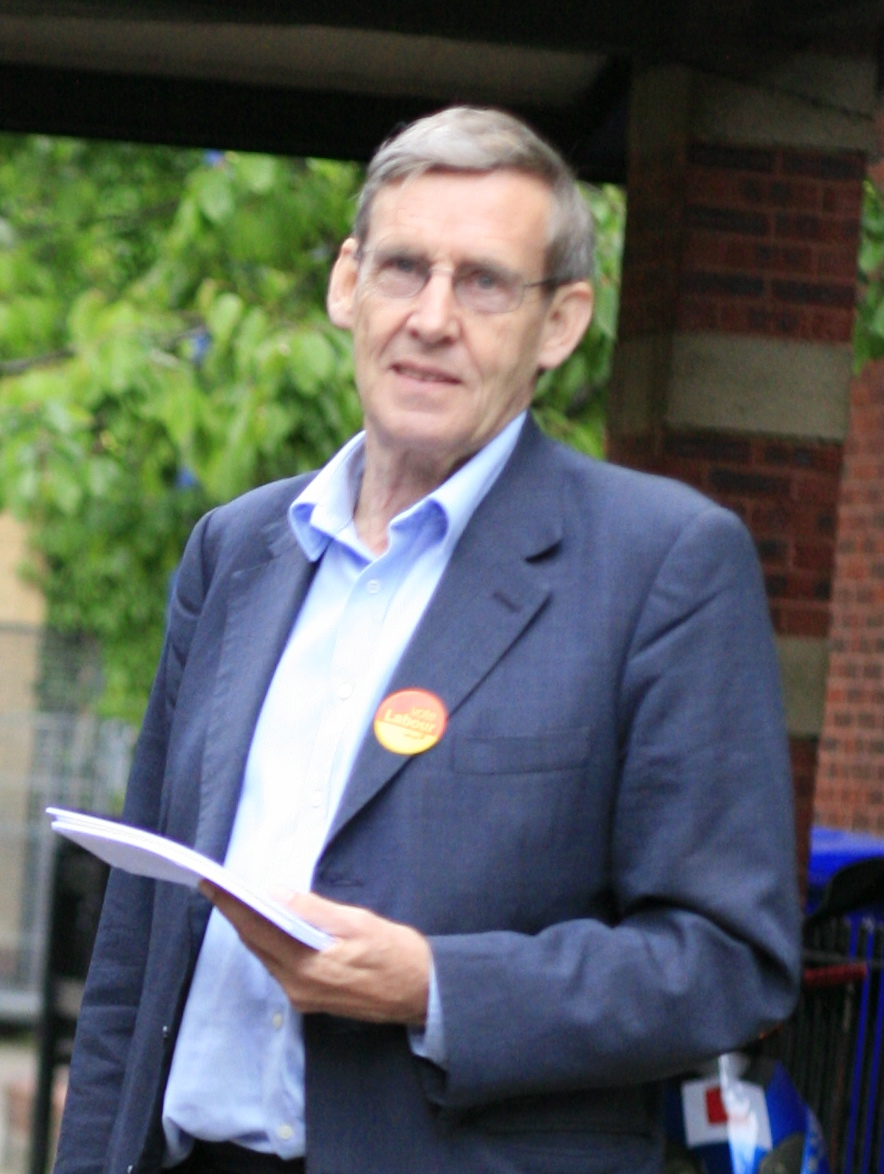
- Linton in June 2013

Member of Parliament for Battersea
- In office 1 May 1997 – 12 April 2010
- Preceded by: John Bowis
- Succeeded by: Jane Ellison

Personal details
- Born: 11 August 1944 (age 82) Stockholm, Sweden
- Party: Labour
- Education: Pembroke College, Oxford

John Martin Linton (born 11 August 1944) is a British Labour Party politician, who was the Member of Parliament for Battersea from 1997 to 2010.

== Early life ==
Linton attended Limpsfield Primary School in Limpsfield, Surrey; Christ's Hospital school in Horsham, Sussex; and Pembroke College, Oxford gaining an MA in PPE; and Université de Lyon. Prior to becoming an MP, Linton was a journalist for the Guardian from 1981 to 1997, and was a councillor in Wandsworth from 1971 to 1982.

During his career in journalism, he worked for Daily Mail (1966–71), The Financial Times, Labour Weekly (1971–79) and the Daily Star (1980–81).

== Parliamentary career ==
He served as a Parliamentary Private Secretary (PPS) to Baroness Blackstone in the Department of Culture, Media and Sport (DCMS) from 2001 to 2003, and to Peter Hain as Leader of the House of Commons from 2003 to 2005. After the 2005 General Election he was made a PPS again, this time in the Department for Constitutional Affairs (DCA).

He is Treasurer of British-Swedish Parliamentary Association and Vice-Chairman of All-Party British-Swedish Group, reflecting his Swedish roots.

After the 2005 general election, his majority stood at 163, one of the Commons' smallest in that parliament.

He visited the West Bank and Gaza in September 2007 with the Britain-Palestine All Party Parliamentary Group. Following that visit, Linton founded and currently chairs Labour Friends of Palestine & the Middle East. The organisation is committed to a two-state solution with secure Palestinian and Israeli states. He has visited Israel and Gaza three times to campaign for peace talks.

Active on a number of environmental issues, he successfully lobbied the government to target a cut of 80% in Carbon emissions by 2050 rather than a cut of 60%. Linton opposed plans to build a third runway at Heathrow He signed a number of Early Day Motions supporting tougher action on environmental issues and has promised to reduce his personal carbon emissions by 10% as part of the 10:10 campaign.

Linton has campaigned for electoral reform for a number of years and wrote Labour's Road to Electoral Reform: What's Wrong with First-Past-the-Post? (with Mary Georghiou, 1993) and Making Votes Count: The Case for Electoral Reform (1998). The government backed one of Martin's amendments in February 2010 which puts the Labour party's commitment to a referendum on the alternative vote system into legislation. Linton does not believe that tax exiles should be able to donate to political parties, and has lobbied for an enquiry into whether Lord Ashcroft breached the House of Lords code of conduct.

He voted for MPs' expenses to be made more transparent since 2007, and was ranked the 13th lowest spending MP by an independent think tank

In March 2010, Linton drew criticism for remarks he made to a meeting at the House of Commons held by the Palestine Solidarity Campaign and Friends of al-Aqsa, in which he stated that:

“There are long tentacles of Israel in this country who are funding election campaigns and putting money into the British political system for their own ends...when you make decisions about how you vote and how you advise constituents to vote, you must make them aware of the attempt by Israelis and by pro-Israelis to influence the election.”

At the 2010 General Election, he lost his seat to Jane Ellison of the Conservative Party.

== Personal life ==
He lives in Battersea with his wife Sara (married July 2008) and his two stepdaughters. His first wife Kathy, with whom he had two children, died in 1995. His great-grandfather, Sydney Linton, was the inaugural Bishop of Riverina, New South Wales, Australia.

Parliament of the United Kingdom
Preceded by John Bowis	Member of Parliament for Battersea; 1997 – 2010	Succeeded by Jane Ellison
