= Balham (ward) =

Electoral ward in the London Borough of Wandsworth

- Electoral ward for the Wandsworth London Borough Council
- Borough: London Borough of Wandsworth
- County: Greater London
- Population: 17,707 (2021)
- Major settlements: Balham
- Area: 1.478 km²

Current electoral ward
- Created: 1965
- Seats: 3

Balham is an electoral ward in the London Borough of Wandsworth. The ward was first used in the 1964 elections and elects three councillors to Wandsworth London Borough Council.

== Geography ==
The ward is based on the suburb of Balham.

== Councillors ==
Election	Councillors		
2022	Daniel Hamilton (Conservative)	Lynsey Hedges (Conservative)	Jo Rigby (Labour)

== Elections ==
=== 2022 ===
Balham (3)
Party	Candidate	Votes	%
Conservative	Lynsey Hedges	2,284	43.5
Conservative	Daniel Hamilton	2,250	42.8
Labour	Jo Rigby	2,214	42.1
Conservative	Azhar Chaudhry	2,188	41.6
Labour	Douglas Oddy	1,963	37.4
Labour	Richard Taylor	1,913	36.4
Green	Alexa Crow	659	12.5
Green	Ben Burt	528	10.0
Green	John Low	514	9.8
Liberal Democrats	Provence Maydew	405	7.7
Liberal Democrats	Shanaz Casoojee	353	6.7
Liberal Democrats	Raaid Casoojee	294	5.6
Turnout		5,254	42.2
Conservative hold			
Conservative hold			
Labour gain from Conservative			

== See also ==
- List of electoral wards in Greater London
