= Wandsworth Town (ward) =

Electoral ward in the London Borough of Wandsworth

- Electoral ward for the Wandsworth London Borough Council
- Borough: London Borough of Wandsworth
- County: Greater London
- Population: 18,211 (2021)
- Major settlements: Wandsworth
- Area: 1.663 km²

Current electoral ward
- Created: 2022
- Seats: 3

Wandsworth Town is an electoral ward in the London Borough of Wandsworth. The ward was first used in the 2022 elections and elects three councillors to Wandsworth London Borough Council.

== Geography ==
The ward is named after Wandsworth Town.

== Councillors ==
Election	Councillors		
2026	Noel Dube (Conservative)	Sarah Davies (Labour)	Michelle Susan Cook (Labour)
2022	Will Sweet (Conservative)	Sarah Davies (Labour)	Sana Jafri (Labour)

== Elections ==
=== 2022 ===
Wandsworth Town (3)
Party	Candidate	Votes	%
Labour	Sarah Davies	2,835	48.8
Labour	Sana Jafri	2,618	45.1
Conservative	William Sweet	2,472	42.5
Conservative	Rishi Goenka	2,445	42.1
Labour	Sam Nicholas	2,439	42.0
Conservative	Piers McCausland	2,415	41.6
Green	James Couper	623	10.7
Green	Joyce Moreau	543	9.3
Liberal Democrats	Patrick Warren	476	8.2
Turnout		5,811	44.8
Labour win (new seat)			
Labour win (new seat)			
Conservative win (new seat)			

== See also ==
- List of electoral wards in Greater London
