= Parks and open spaces in the London Borough of Wandsworth =

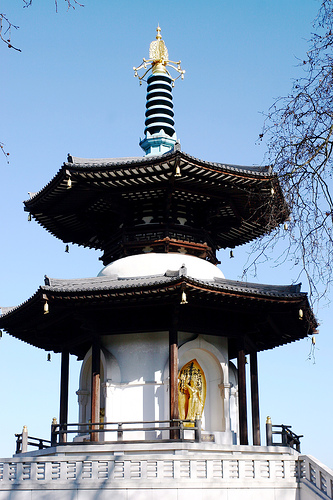
Peace pagoda in Battersea Park

The inner London borough of Wandsworth contains some 670 hectares (1,700 acres) of green space in the form of parks, commons, allotments and cemeteries, which is the largest amount for an Inner London borough. Central London borders some of the borough's boundary with the Thames the closest park to which is Battersea Park.

At 92 hectares (230 acres), Tooting Commons in the south of the borough, between Balham and Streatham are Wandsworth's largest public open space (not shared with any other borough). It is followed by 83-hectare (210-acre) Battersea Park. This has Battersea Park Nature Areas, the borough's only local nature reserve. Wandsworth Common, to the south of Clapham Junction bisected by a railway line is the third largest park, at 73 hectares (180 acres).

Wimbledon and Putney Commons are very large open spaces, 479 hectares (1,180 acres) in total, partly within the borough, to the south of Putney and Roehampton, and are managed by a board of Conservators rather than any individual borough.

King George's Park is a 23-hectare (57-acre) stretch of green space along the western side of the River Wandle, just south of Wandsworth town centre. It is one of a string of green spaces along the Wandle Valley, along with Garratt Park in Earlsfield and Lambeth Cemetery in Tooting.

Remaining green spaces in the borough include Falcon Park in Battersea (a green space enclosed within a railway junction), Wandsworth Park (a Grade II listed park on the River Thames between Wandsworth and Putney), Roehampton Golf Course, Central London Golf Centre, the western half of Clapham Common, Wandsworth Cemetery, Streatham Cemetery and York Gardens, along with a whole host of smaller spaces.

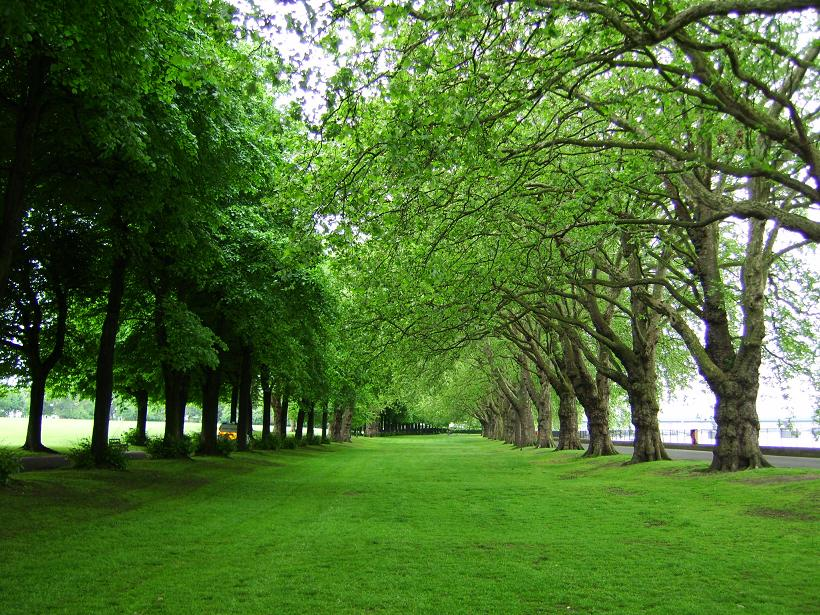
Trees in Wandsworth Park
