= Earlsfield =

Coordinates: 51.4439°N 0.1854°W

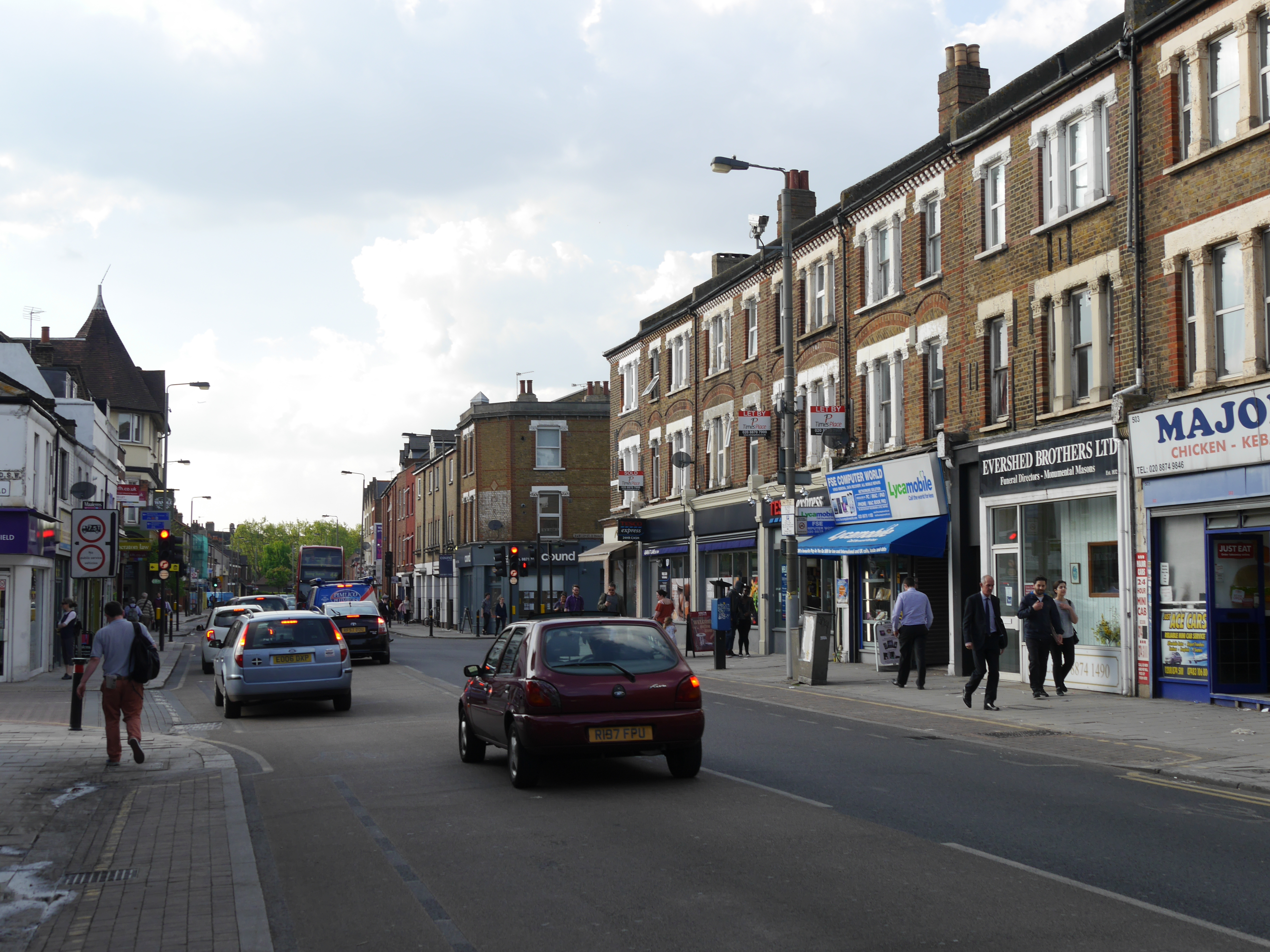
- Garratt Lane, Earlsfield

- Location within Greater London
- Population: 15,448 (Earlsfield ward 2011)
- OS grid reference: TQ265735
- London borough: Wandsworth
- Ceremonial county: Greater London
- Region: London
- Country: England
- Sovereign state: United Kingdom
- Post town: LONDON
- Postcode district: SW18
- Dialling code: 020
- Police: Metropolitan
- Fire: London
- Ambulance: London
- UK Parliament: Tooting
- London Assembly: Merton and Wandsworth

Earlsfield is an area within the London Borough of Wandsworth, London, England. It is a typical south London suburb and comprises mostly residential Victorian terraced houses with a high street of shops, bars, and restaurants between Garratt Lane, Allfarthing Lane, and Burntwood Lane. The population of Earlsfield at the 2011 Census was 15,500, increasing to 18,500 in 2022.

== History ==
In medieval times, the area now known as Earlsfield was the northern part of the manor and hamlet of Garrat (also spelt Garratt, Garrett or Garret) in the parish of Wandsworth and notorious in the 18th century for the Garrat mock elections. By then the area was already industrialised with numerous mills along the River Wandle and in the early 19th century London's first railway, the horse-drawn Surrey Iron Railway, ran along Garratt Lane. This was followed in 1838 by the opening of the London and South Western Railway which originally passed through without stopping. Later in the century, suburban development began to creep across from Wandsworth Common.

In April 1884, the London and South Western Railway opened Earlsfield station on Garratt Lane, prompting further development. The station was named after a nearby residence, Earlsfield, now demolished. This was owned by the Davis family, who also owned the land required for the station, and one of the conditions of sale was that the station would be named after their house.

The area was once a working-class suburb of Wandsworth and as such much of the property is medium-sized terraced housing, though several new developments have been or are being developed, notably the Olympian Homes development between the station and library. The area now houses young families attracted by the affordability of the area in comparison to its northern, western and eastern neighbours, Clapham, Wandsworth, Battersea and Putney, contributing to the wider area's nickname of Nappy Valley.

Earlsfield Library has on display a range of historic photographs of the area.

Between 1853 and 1864, the area in the south of Earlsfield, Summerstown, was the site of the Copenhagen Running Grounds, a major venue for pedestrianism.

Haldane Place, near the Wandle, was the site of the main manufacturing base for Airfix between 1939 and 1981.

== Schools ==
Earlsfield is home to many schools that cater to children from early years through to secondary education. Primary schools in the area include Allfarthing, Beatrix Potter, Earlsfield, Floreat Wandsworth and Swaffield. Secondary schools include Burntwood, Southfields Academy and St. Cecilia's.

== Transport ==
Earlsfield railway station provides access to central London (three stops to London Waterloo (Clapham Junction, Vauxhall, Waterloo) in 12 minutes) and other areas in South London (Victoria - changing at Clapham Junction, Wimbledon one stop).

Near to Earlsfield are the London Underground stations of Tooting Bec on the Northern Line, and Southfields on the District Line. Earlsfield also has several bus links, with routes to and from central London including Tooting to Victoria Station (route 44), Tooting to Waterloo Station (route 77) and Mitcham to Putney Bridge (route 270).

== Geography ==
Earlsfield is bordered by Wandsworth to the north, Tooting to the south, Clapham to the north east, and Wimbledon to the south west. The area is largely residential, with green spaces such as King George’s Park, Garratt Green and Springfield Park providing recreational areas. The River Wandle flows roughly parallel to Garratt Lane through the area.

== High Street ==
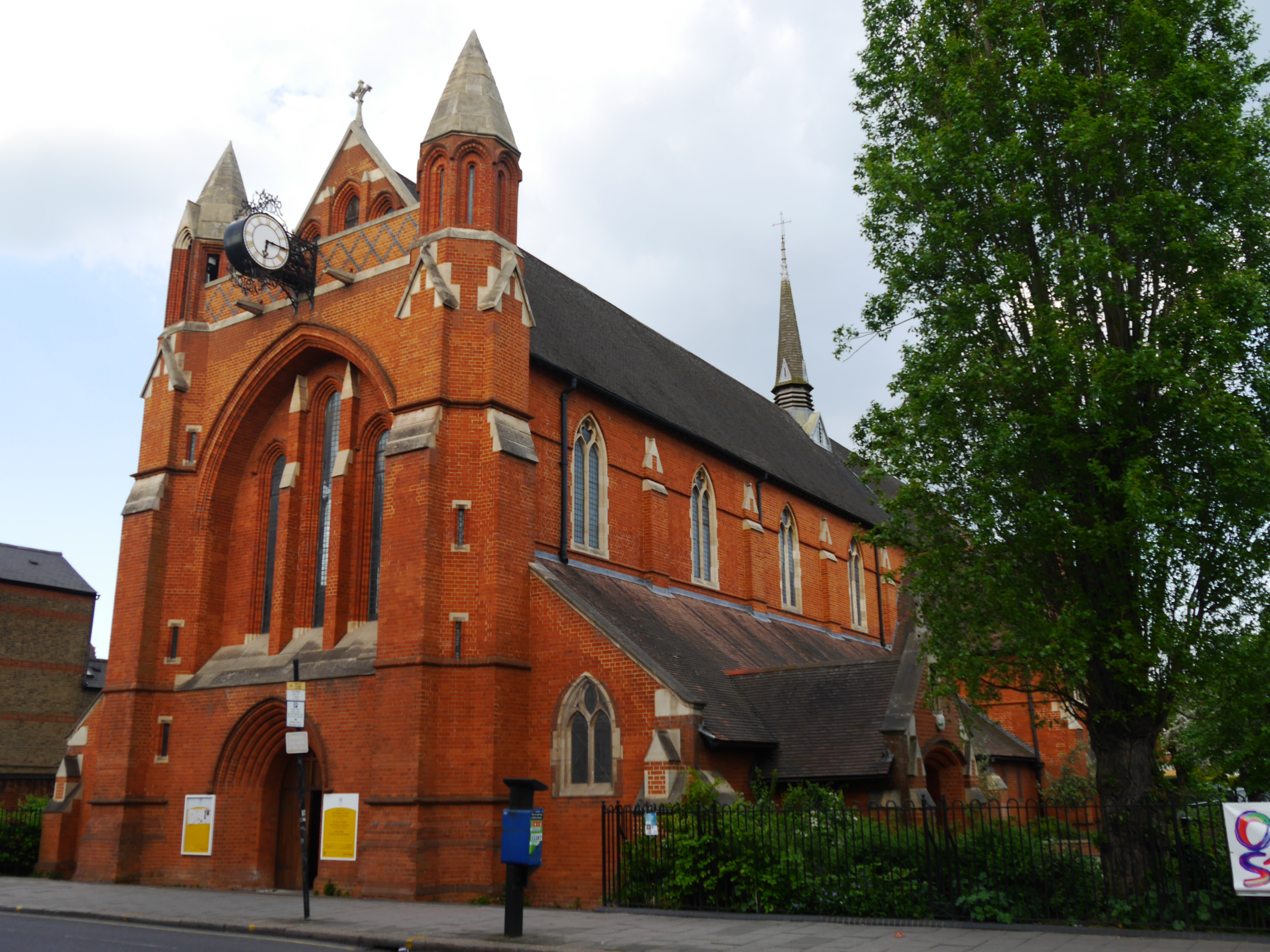
St Andrew's, Earlsfield

The main shopping street – Garratt Lane – includes estate agents, cafes and restaurants, pubs, bars and hairdressers. The stretch of Earlsfield just to the south of the station includes chains and an increasing number of independent cafes, delicatessen, butchers and public houses including The Earlsfield situated in the old railway station house have opened in recent years.

Garratt Lane is home to cross-cultural theatre company Tara Arts and its venue Tara Theatre. Opened in 2007 (and refurbished in 2016), the space hosts local and national companies as well as staging its own productions.

There are two churches in the centre - Earlsfield Baptist church (opened in 1900) on Magdalen Road and St Andrew's, Earlsfield (Church of England, built in two stages between 1888 and 1902) on the corner of Garratt Lane and Waynflete Street, with St Gregory's (Catholic) and St John the Divine (Church of England) further down Garratt Lane towards Wandsworth.

== Notable residents ==
- Louis de Bernières – He lived in Earlsfield while writing Captain Corelli's Mandolin. His book and play Sunday Morning At the Centre of the World "is a homage to the diverse community of Earlsfield."
- Sadiq Khan – Former MP for Tooting (which includes Earlsfield within its constituency boundaries) and Mayor of London since May 2016. He lived as a child in the Henry Prince Estate on Garratt Lane.

== Neighbours ==
- Wandsworth Common SW17
- Clapham SW12
- Battersea SW11
- Wandsworth SW18
- Tooting SW17
- Southfields SW19
- Putney SW15

== Next stop neighbouring travel connections ==
- Inbound: Clapham Junction
- Outbound: Wimbledon
