= Jatinder Verma =

British theatre director and activist (born 1954)

Jatinder Verma, MBE (born 1954), is a British theatre director and activist, who in 1977 co-founded the British Asian theatre company Tara Arts, leading it as artistic director.

== Biography ==
Born in Dar es Salaam, Tanzania, and raised in Nairobi, Kenya, he moved with his family to Britain as a 14-year-old in February 1968. He attended York University and Sussex University. Verma was one of the co-founders of Tara Arts, a British Asian theatre company that was created in response to the racial tensions in Britain in the late 1970s. Verma directed Tara's very first production (an adaptation of a Tagore play) at Battersea Arts Centre in August 1977. Later on, Tara Arts got its own theatre on Garratt Lane, Earlsfield in South London.

Regarded as one of the pioneers of British Asian theatre, Verma has received numerous honours, including an MBE for his services to the arts in the 2017 New Year Honours.

Verma led Tara Arts as Artistic Director since inception before stepping down after 43 years. He had initiated, and managed the project through to its completion in 2016, a total rebuilding of Tara Theatre, its headquarters. It included using the yellow bricks from the original building, now a distinct, warm, welcoming feature of its new auditorium, foyer and exterior.
