= London Borough of Wandsworth =

- London borough
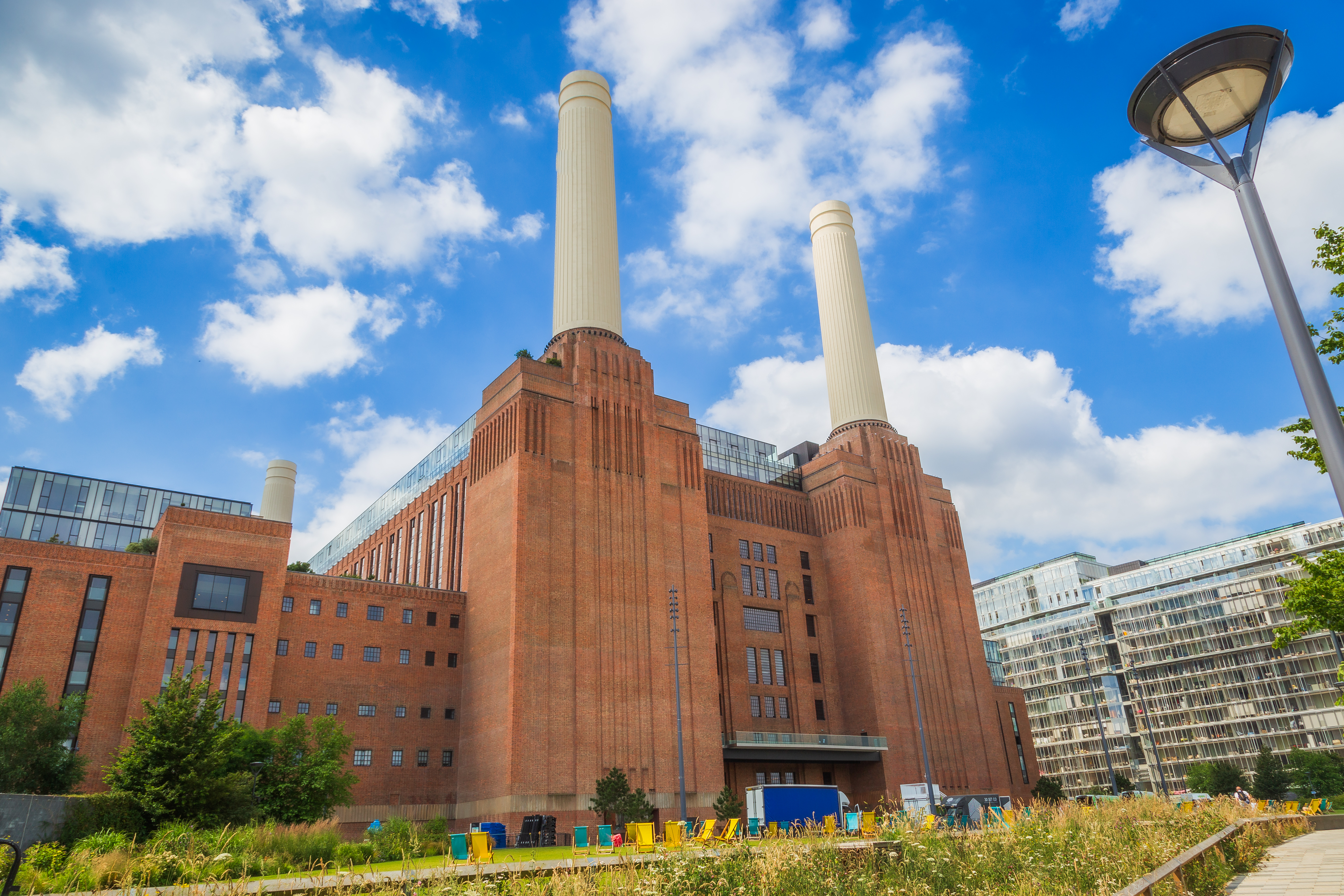
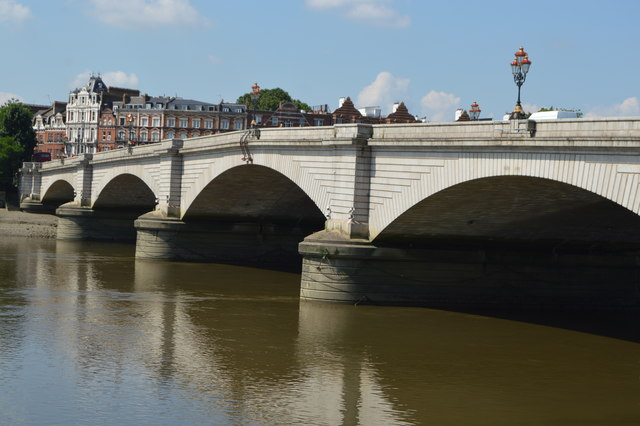
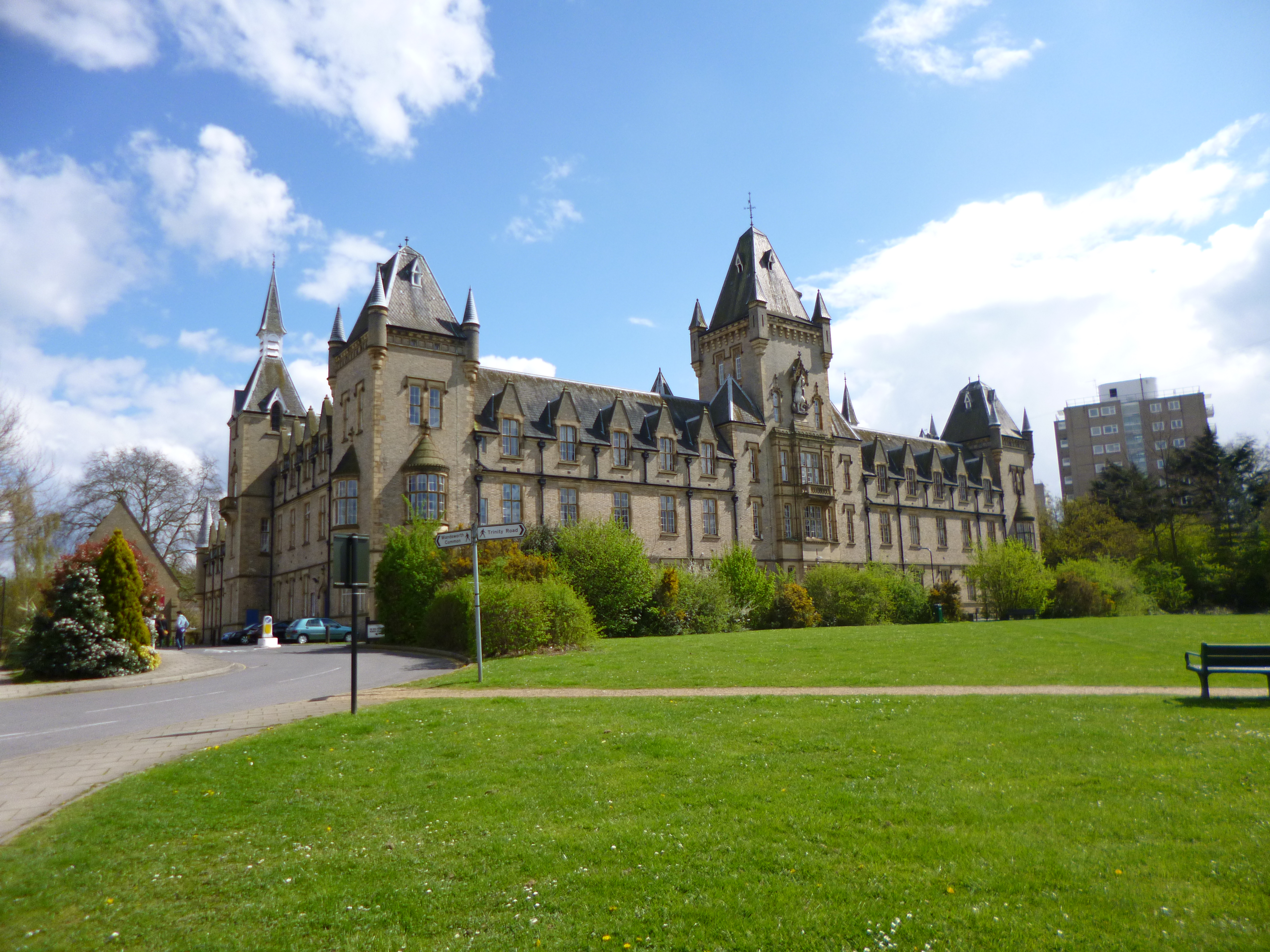
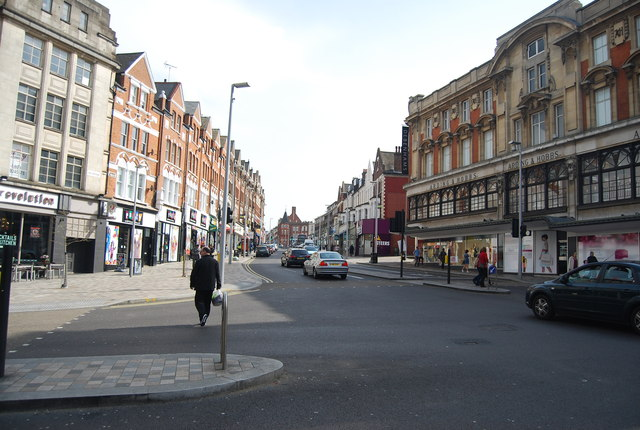
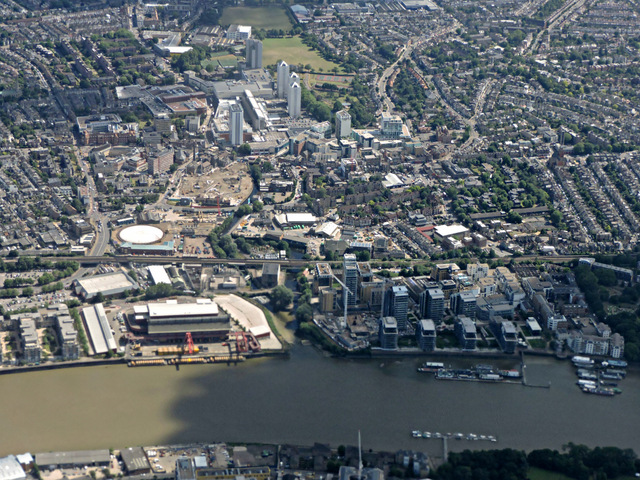
- From the top left; Top: Battersea Power Station; Middle: Putney Bridge; Royal Victoria Patriotic Building; Bottom: Battersea; Wandsworth from the air

- Coat of arms Council logo
- Motto: We Serve
- Wandsworth shown within Greater London
- Coordinates: 51°27′26.3″N 0°11′41.5″W
- Sovereign state: United Kingdom
- Constituent country: England
- Region: London
- Ceremonial county: Greater London
- Created: 1 April 1965
- Admin HQ: Wandsworth

Government
  - Type: London borough council
  - Body: Wandsworth London Borough Council
  - London Assembly: Leonie Cooper (Labour) AM for Merton and Wandsworth
  - MPs: Fleur Anderson (Labour); Rosena Allin-Khan (Labour); Marsha de Cordova (Labour)

Area
  - Total: 13.23 sq mi (34.26 km^{2})
  - Rank: 273rd (of 296)

Population (2025)
  - Total: 339,859
  - Rank: 32nd (of 296)
  - Density: 25,690/sq mi (9,920/km^{2})
- Time zone: UTC (GMT)
  - Summer (DST): UTC+1 (BST)
- Postcodes: SW
- Area code: 020
- ISO 3166 code: GB-WND
- ONS code: 00BJ
- GSS code: E09000032
- Police: Metropolitan Police
- Website: www.wandsworth.gov.uk

Wandsworth (/ˈwɒndzwɜːrθ/) is a London borough in South West London, England. It forms part of Inner London and has an estimated population of 329,677 inhabitants. Its main communities are Battersea, Balham, Putney, Tooting and Wandsworth Town.

The borough borders the London Borough of Lambeth to the east, the London Borough of Merton and the Royal Borough of Kingston upon Thames to the south, the London Borough of Richmond upon Thames to the west, and to the north (across the River Thames) three boroughs, namely the London Borough of Hammersmith and Fulham, the Royal Borough of Kensington and Chelsea and the City of Westminster. The local authority is Wandsworth London Borough Council.

== History ==
The area of the modern borough was historically part of the county of Surrey. From 1856 the area was governed by the Metropolitan Board of Works, which was established to provide services across the metropolis of London. In 1889 the Metropolitan Board of Works' area was made the County of London. From 1856 until 1900 the lower tier of local government within the metropolis comprised various parish vestries and district boards. One such district was the Wandsworth District, containing the six parishes of Battersea, (Note: Excluding the parish's exclave of Penge) Clapham, Putney, Streatham, Tooting Graveney and Wandsworth. In 1888 Battersea was removed from the district to be governed by its own vestry. In 1900 the lower tier was reorganised into metropolitan boroughs. The parish of Battersea became the Metropolitan Borough of Battersea and the Wandsworth District became the Metropolitan Borough of Wandsworth.

The modern borough was created in 1965 under the London Government Act 1963. It covered the former borough of Battersea and the majority of the former borough of Wandsworth, but excluding the Clapham and Streatham areas, which went to Lambeth.

== Geography ==
The borough includes the major Clapham Junction railway station, which despite the name is in Battersea not Clapham. There are many new or refurbished buildings along the borough's prosperous riverside including the large Chelsea Bridge Wharf. The Peace Pagoda, one of many such international pagodas, is in Battersea Park, a sprawling rectangle often hosting circuses beside the Thames. The London Heliport, London's main and busiest heliport, is just beyond Battersea Park, and south of this is New Covent Garden Market. In terms of size, South Thames College, Southside Shopping Centre, Wandsworth and The Exchange Shopping Centre, Putney are among the largest secular structures.

The secular buildings most highly listed for their architecture include: Battersea Power Station, the Battersea Arts Centre (formerly town hall), Royal Hospital for Neuro-disability, Wandsworth Town Hall, as well as particularly the interiors of the large Gala Bingo Club, Tooting, the former Granada Theatre, St John's Hill, Clapham Junction by Theodore Komisarjevsky, and in terms of ornate mansions a cluster of five large stone and brick buildings mostly converted to diverse public uses in and around Queen Mary's Hospital, Roehampton at grade II* or above. In Old Battersea two fine masonry mansions survived The Blitz: Old Battersea House and Downshire House—both hold rare Grade II* status.

== Governance ==
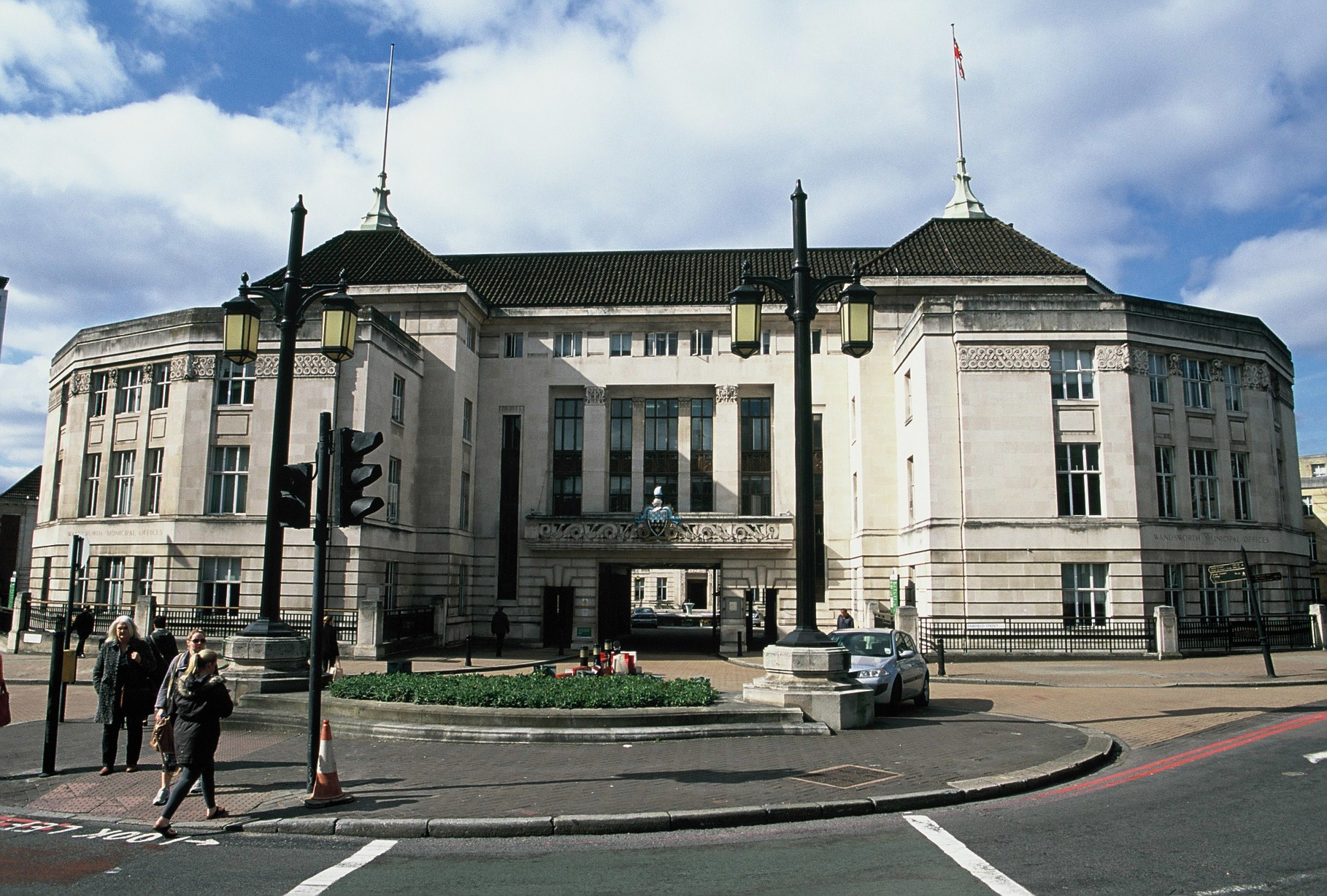
Wandsworth Town Hall

The local authority is Wandsworth Council, based at Wandsworth Town Hall.

=== Greater London representation ===
Since 2000, for elections to the London Assembly, the borough forms part of the Merton and Wandsworth constituency.

=== Westminster Parliament ===
The borough contains three parliamentary constituencies:

- Battersea
- Putney
- Tooting

== Demographics ==
Population pyramid of the Borough of Wandsworth in 2021

=== Population ===
According to the 2021 census, Wandsworth has a population of 327,506. In 2021, 67.8% of the population was white, 10.1% black and 11.6% Asian.

A 2017 study by Trust for London and the New Policy Institute found that Wandsworth has the lowest rate of unemployment of any London borough. It also has the 2nd lowest rate of local employees who are low-paid.

Population census
Year	Pop.	±%
1801	12,087	—
1811	15,303	+26.6%
1821	17,779	+16.2%
1831	19,681	+10.7%
1841	23,959	+21.7%
1851	30,241	+26.2%
1861	74,569	+146.6%
1871	118,896	+59.4%
1881	163,224	+37.3%
1891	243,427	+49.1%
1901	306,090	+25.7%
1911	384,884	+25.7%
1921	394,964	+2.6%
1931	405,317	+2.6%
1941	375,040	−7.5%
1951	347,025	−7.5%
1961	323,064	−6.9%
1971	300,832	−6.9%
1981	252,242	−16.2%
1991	265,058	+5.1%
2001	260,383	−1.8%
2011	306,995	+17.9%
2021	327,506	+6.7%
2024 estimate	337,655	+3.1%
Note: 2024 estimate

=== Ethnicity ===
Ethnic Group	Year													
Ethnic Group	1966 estimations		1971 estimations		1981 estimations		1991 census		2001 census		2011 census		2021 census	
Ethnic Group	Number	%	Number	%	Number	%	Number	%	Number	%	Number	%	Number	%
White: Total	–	93.8%	–	89.1%	200,184	81.2%	201,821	80%	202,978	78.0%	219,216	71.4%	222,090	67.8%
White: British	–	–	–	–	–	–	–	–	168,665	64.8%	163,739	53.3%	157,048	48.0%
White: Irish	–	4.1%	–	–	–	–	–	–	8,151	3.1%	7,664	2.5%	8,061	2.5%
White: Gypsy or Irish Traveller	–	–	–	–	–	–	–	–	–	–	163	0.1%	120	0.0%
White: Roma	–	–	–	–	–	–	–	–	–	–	–	–	1,730	0.5%
White: Other	–	–	–	–	–	–	–	–	26,162	10.0%	47,650	15.5%	55,131	16.8%
Asian or Asian British: Total	–	1.7%	–	–	–	–	19,543	7.7%	20,271	7.8%	33,338	10.9%	38,314	11.6%
Asian or Asian British: Indian	–	–	–	–	–	–	7,700		7,412	2.8%	8,642	2.8%	9,599	2.9%
Asian or Asian British: Pakistani	–	–	–	–	–	–	4,198		5,449	2.1%	9,718	3.2%	12,249	3.7%
Asian or Asian British: Bangladeshi	–	–	–	–	–	–	1,020		1,099	0.4%	1,493	0.5%	1,639	0.5%
Asian or Asian British: Chinese	–	–	–	–	–	–	2,077		2,227	0.9%	3,715	1.2%	4,658	1.4%
Asian or Asian British: Other Asian	–	–	–	–	–	–	4,548		4,084	1.6%	9,770	3.2%	10,169	3.1%
Black or Black British: Total	–	4.5%	–	–	–	–	26,815	10.6%	25,066	9.6%	32,756	10.7%	33,062	10.1%
Black or Black British: African	–	1%	–	–	–	–	7,303		10,013	3.8%	14,818	4.8%	17,330	5.3%
Black or Black British: Caribbean	–	3.5%	–	–	–	–	15,305		12,665	4.9%	12,297	4.0%	11,356	3.5%
Black or Black British: Other Black	–	–	–	–	–	–	4,207		2,388	0.9%	5,641	1.8%	4,376	1.3%
Mixed or British Mixed: Total	–	–	–	–	–	–	–	–	8,728	3.4%	15,241	5.0%	20,598	6.3%
Mixed: White and Black Caribbean	–	–	–	–	–	–	–	–	2,893	1.1%	4,642	1.5%	5,340	1.6%
Mixed: White and Black African	–	–	–	–	–	–	–	–	1,252	0.5%	2,034	0.7%	2,494	0.8%
Mixed: White and Asian	–	–	–	–	–	–	–	–	2,247	0.9%	3,887	1.3%	5,776	1.8%
Mixed: Other Mixed	–	–	–	–	–	–	–	–	2,336	0.9%	4,678	1.5%	6,988	2.1%
Other: Total	–	–	–	–	–	–	4,246	1.7%	3,337	1.3%	6,444	2.1%	13,442	4.1%
Other: Arab	–	–	–	–	–	–	–	–	–	–	2,350	0.8%	3,860	1.2%
Other: Any other ethnic group	–	–	–	–	–	–	4,246	1.7%	3,337	1.3%	4,094	1.3%	9,582	2.9%
Ethnic minority: Total	–	6.2%	–	10.9%	46,490	18.8%	50,604	20%	57,402	22.1%	87,779	28.7%	105,416	32.2%
Total	–	100%	–	100%	246,674	100%	252,425	100%	260,380	100.00%	306,995	100.00%	327,506	100%

=== Immigration ===
This list includes top-15 sources of immigration to Borough of Wandsworth for 2021 census:

#	Country	Number
1	Italy	6,864
2	Pakistan	6,533
3	Poland	5,698
4	Ireland	5,062
5	South Africa	4,860
6	France	4,629
7	United States	4,486
8	India	4,280
9	Australia	4,062
10	Spain	3,858
11	Brazil	3,156
12	Germany	2,976
13	Jamaica	2,944
14	Philippines	2,713
15	Somalia	2,630

== Transport ==
=== Bridges ===
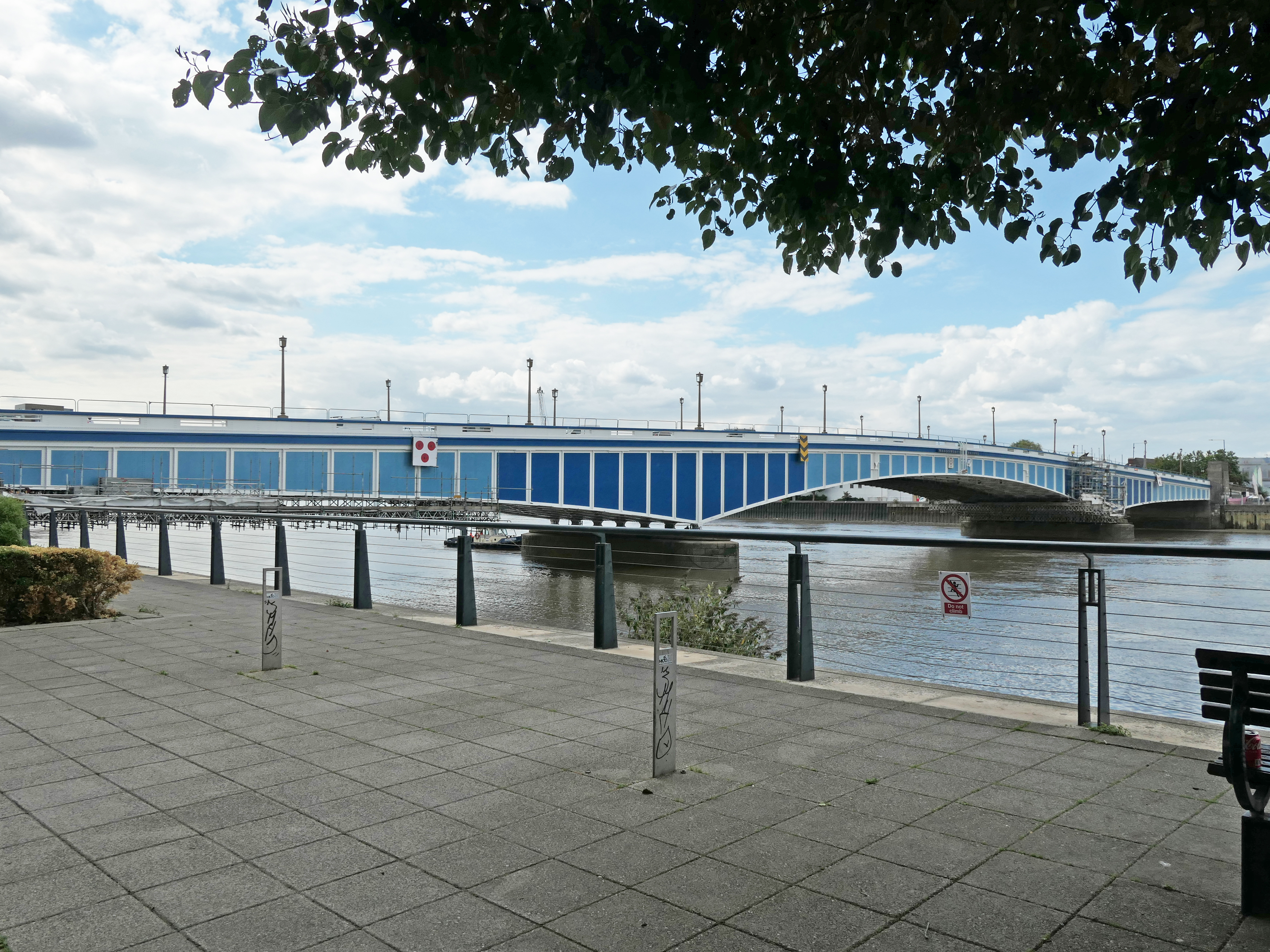
Wandsworth Bridge

Five bridges join Wandsworth to the three London Boroughs on the north side of the Thames (from downstream following the river up):

- Chelsea Bridge
- Albert Bridge
- Battersea Bridge
- Wandsworth Bridge
- Putney Bridge

There are also a number of bridges crossing the River Wandle which runs through the centre of Wandsworth town and divides the borough in two.

=== National rail stations ===
- Clapham Junction
- Earlsfield
- Putney
- Battersea Park
- Balham
- Wandsworth Common
- Tooting (on border with London Borough of Merton)
- Queenstown Road (Battersea)
- Wandsworth Town

=== Underground stations ===
- On the Northern line:
  - Battersea Power Station
  - Clapham South
  - Balham
  - Tooting Bec
  - Tooting Broadway
- On the District line:
  - East Putney
  - Southfields

National Rail services are operated from London Waterloo by South Western Railway to Earlsfield, Putney, Queenstown Road (Battersea), Wandsworth Town and the borough's largest station, Clapham Junction. This last station is also served from London Victoria by Southern as are Balham, Battersea Park and Wandsworth Common.

London Overground services mainly serve Clapham Junction, which is the southern terminus for the West London Line that has services to Stratford via Shepherd's Bush, though some trains terminate at the West London Line's northern terminus at Willesden Junction. The western terminus for the East London Line also is at Clapham Junction that has services to Highbury & Islington via Denmark Hill. There is also a limited one train a day parliamentary train service that terminates at Battersea Park instead of Clapham Junction.

London Underground services are provided on the District line to East Putney and Southfields and on the Northern line to Battersea Power Station, Balham, Clapham South, Tooting Bec and Tooting Broadway.

=== Cycling and walking ===
Wandsworth London Borough Council and Transport for London (TfL) maintain cycling infrastructure in the Borough.

Cycle Superhighway 7 (CS7) is an unbroken, signposted cycle route running through the southeastern portion of the Borough. The route runs along the A24 and A3 roads, through Tooting, Balham, and Clapham. Northbound the route links the Borough directly to the City of London via Kennington, Elephant and Castle, and Southwark. Southbound, the route runs unbroken to Colliers Wood.

Cycle Superhighway 8 (CS8) is an unbroken, signposted cycle route running through the northern edge of Wandsworth, through Battersea. The route runs east–west along the A3205/Battersea Park Road, but the route leaves the Borough to the north over Chelsea Bridge. The route begins in Wandsworth Town and runs to Millbank, City of Westminster, passing Chelsea and the Tate Britain en route.

Although CS8 leaves the Borough to the north, cycling infrastructure is provided along the entire A3205 route between Wandsworth Town and Nine Elms. This means that there is a continuous, signposted cycle route - primarily along designated cycle lanes - from Wandsworth Town and Battersea to Vauxhall, Lambeth, and the South Bank.

Quietway 4 (Q4) runs from Clapham Common to Earlsfield in the Borough, through Wandsworth Common.

The Wandle Trail is a shared-use trail for cyclists and pedestrians between Wandsworth Town and Waddon. The route is signposted and mainly traffic-free. It runs through Earlsfield, Colliers Wood, Morden, Mitcham, and Carshalton along the way.

The Santander Cycles bike-sharing system operates in Putney, Wandsworth Town, and Battersea.

=== Travel to work ===
In March 2011, the main forms of transport that residents used to travel to work were (of all residents aged 16–74):

- underground, metro, light rail, tram, 20.7%;
- train, 10.6%;
- driving a car or van, 10.6%;
- bus, minibus or coach, 9.7%;
- on foot, 5.6%;
- bicycle, 5.4%;
- work mainly at or from home, 4.0%.

== Education ==
Whitelands College was founded Chelsea in 1842 by the Church of England, and heavily under the influence of John Ruskin. In 1930/1931 the college relocated to West Hill (Wandsworth Borough) and occupied an enormous purpose-built site, with buildings designed by Sir Giles Gilbert Scott. These buildings, now listed, were one of the Borough's largest educational sites until 2005 when the college, again moved, this time to a site in Roehampton, where it is now a constituent College of Roehampton University.

The borough's schools include Emanuel School, Graveney School, Putney High School, Southfields Academy, Burntwood School, Ashcroft Technology Academy, Ernest Bevin Academy, Ark Bolingbroke Academy, Ark Putney Academy and Chestnut Grove Academy.

== Religion ==
The dominant religion of the borough is Christianity, although the area is also home to a number of other religious communities. The community is home to a number of Sikhs, Jews, Muslims, Buddhists and Hindus.

According to the 2011 Census, approximately 35% of Wandsworth identified as being non-religious, or chose not to state their faith.

The following shows the religious identity of residents residing in Wandsworth according to the 2001, 2011 and the 2021 censuses.

Religion	2001		2011		2021	
Religion	Number	%	Number	%	Number	%
Holds religious beliefs	185,515	71.2	200,138	65.2	185,457	56.6
Christian	160,946	61.8	162,590	53.0	139,656	42.6
Muslim	13,529	5.2	24,746	8.1	32,519	9.9
Jewish	1,691	0.6	1,617	0.5	1,756	0.5
Hindu	5,929	2.3	6,496	2.1	6,419	2.0
Sikh	651	0.3	832	0.3	967	0.3
Buddhist	1,843	0.7	2,574	0.8	2,275	0.7
Other religion	926	0.4	1,283	0.4	1,871	0.6
No religion	52,042	20.0	82,740	27.0	118,543	36.2
Religion not stated	22,823	8.8	24,117	7.8	23,500	7.2
Total population	260,380	100.0	306,995	100.0	327,500	100.0

== Places ==
=== Parks and open spaces ===
Wandsworth has responsibility for three Metropolitan Open Spaces:

- Battersea Park
- Wandsworth Common
- Tooting Commons – the historically separate, but adjoining, Tooting Bec Common and Tooting Graveney Common

These three large green spaces together with a range of smaller parks and playgrounds (such as Wandsworth Park) are patrolled by Wandsworth Council's own parks police known from 1984 to 2012 as the Wandsworth Parks Police. From April 2012 the Parks Police team of 23 officers was replaced by a smaller Wandsworth Events Police Service (WEPS) working with a team of 12 Metropolitan Police Officers. This system was deemed unsuccessful, and in 2015 the WEPS was rebranded as Wandsworth Parks and Events Police (WPEP) and returned to full staffing levels of 33 police officers and support officers.

Also within the borough's boundaries are Putney Heath and part of Putney Lower Common, which are managed as part of Wimbledon Common, and the west side of Clapham Common, which is managed by the London Borough of Lambeth.

=== Theatres ===
- Battersea Arts Centre
- Theatre503
- Putney Arts Theatre
- Tara Theatre

== Coat of arms ==
The armorial bearings retain many of the features of the arms of the former Metropolitan Borough of Battersea and Metropolitan Borough of Wandsworth.

The fess, or crossing, of the shield is chequered blue and gold representing the arms of William de Warren, created first Earl of Surrey by William Rufus. Each gold square bears a teardrop representing the tears of the French Huguenots, many of whom settled in Wandsworth from 1685.

The ship at the top may refer to the Wendels, a tribe of sea-raiders from the Continent who supposedly gave their name to the district, for Wendelsworth was an early variation of Wandsworth. The four shields and oars on the ship represent the four parishes of Battersea, Putney, Tooting and Wandsworth.

The dove to the left is taken from the former Battersea coat of arms and the black dragon to the right was taken from the former Wandsworth arms and also refers to London, being similar to the City of London coat of arms.

== Twin and partner towns ==
=== Villers-Plouich, France ===
The Borough is informally twinned with the village of Villers-Plouich, in Northern France. This association dates back to World War I, following the role played by the Wandsworth Battalion in the liberation of Villers-Plouich in 1917, and again, following recapture, in 1918. Writing in the 'Wandsworth Borough News' in 1920, Robert H Harker, a Lieutenant in the Battalion, described the cemetery in the village as "an inseparable link between our great Borough and that village of Villers-Plouich, near the Somme".

For his courage and determination during the hostilities, Corporal Edward Foster, of Tooting, was awarded both the Victoria Cross and the Médaille militaire. A green heritage plaque was unveiled at his former home at Tooting in 2017, and in 2018 a memorial in his name was established on the outskirts of Villers-Plouich.

Following the end of the War the village was adopted by the then Metropolitan Borough of Wandsworth under the British 'League of Help' scheme, and funds were donated towards its reconstruction. A deputation from Wandsworth regularly visits to commemorate this connection, most recently in 2018.

=== Schiedam, Netherlands ===
Wandsworth first established a twin town arrangement with Schiedam, in the Netherlands, in 1946. A number of refugees from Schiedam who had lived for a time in Wandsworth during World War II hoped to maintain their connections with the London Borough during peacetime. The twinning was organised within the scope of the Dutch-English Sports Plan. In subsequent years multiple sporting fixtures between teams from the two areas were arranged including football, swimming, gymnastics, korfball (Wandsworth has a korfball club, at Tooting) and cricket (Schiedam is one of the strongholds for cricket in the Netherlands).

For many years the wartime connections were acknowledged during annual Remembrance Day commemorations in the two municipalities, either through an exchange of wreaths or by sending a representative. Within the context of both inter-business exchange and sporting fixtures, visits were also arranged by specific Wandsworth organisations such as Small Electric Motors and the Rediffusion factory, as guests of their counterparts at Schiedam companies such as Wilton Personnel and Pieterman Glass.

In 1970 a large delegation from Wandsworth visited Schiedam for celebrations marking the 25th anniversary of the town's liberation. Further sporting and cultural exchanges continued through to at least 1977. However, in 1997, an article in the Dutch local press observed that the relationship with Wandsworth had lapsed.

== Localities ==
- Balham
- Battersea
- Earlsfield
- Furzedown
- Nine Elms
- Putney
- Putney Heath
- Putney Vale
- Roehampton
- Southfields
- Streatham Park
- Summerstown
- Tooting
- Tooting Bec/Upper Tooting
- Wandsworth
- West Hill

=== Postcode areas ===
SW4 (part), SW8 (part), SW11 (all), SW12 (part), SW15 (part), SW16 (part), SW17 (part), SW18 (part), SW19 (part)

== See also ==
- Wandsworth Radio
- De Morgan Centre
- Borough of Wandsworth Rifle Club
- Wandsworth Museum
