= Wandsworth Parks and Events Police =

Private police service in London

Agency overview
- Formed: 2015
- Preceding agencies: Wandsworth Events Police Service (2012); Wandsworth Parks Police (1984)
- Legal personality: Police service funded by local authority

Jurisdictional structure
- Operations jurisdiction: Wandsworth Borough Council, England, UK
- Area: 34.2 km^{2} (13.2 sq mi)
- Population: 323,300
- Legal jurisdiction: London Borough of Wandsworth
- Governing body: Wandsworth Borough Council
- Constituting instrument: Ministry of Housing and Local Government Provisional Order Confirmation (Greater London Parks and Open Spaces) Act 1967
- General nature: Civilian police

Operational structure
- Headquarters: Parks Police Station, Battersea Park
- Agency executive: Stephen Biggs, Inspector

Facilities
- Stations: 1

Notables
- Awards: Queen Elizabeth II Golden Jubilee Medal; National Vocational Qualification level 5

Website
- Parks Police Website

Wandsworth Parks and Events Police is a Wandsworth Borough Council service responsible for the routine patrolling of the parks, commons, and open spaces within the London Borough of Wandsworth, which has more green spaces than any other inner London borough. It also enforces byelaws, dog control orders, and other park regulations, and provides policing for special events. Its lineage may be traced to a 1984 foundation, although the present body dates from 2012, and was rebranded in 2015 with its current name and responsibilities.

== History ==
Wandsworth Parks Police was the name given to the body of Constables run by Wandsworth Borough Council from 1984 to 2012, which was primarily concerned in patrolling parks and open spaces in the London Borough of Wandsworth to enforce by-laws and other enactments relating to parks and open spaces. Its members were council officers, sworn in as constables referred to by Wandsworth Council as 'Parks Police Constables', or 'Constables'. The constabulary worked closely with the Metropolitan Police Service, with whom there was a history of mutual co-operation, the two forces often assisting each other with arrests, ASBOs, and other operational matters.

In April 2011 Wandsworth Council announced that it was proposing to take advantage of a Metropolitan Police Authority funding scheme that would result in the set up of a Metropolitan Police Safer Parks Team of 16 police officers from the Metropolitan Police (2 sergeants and 14 constables) dedicated to policing the parks and open spaces of the borough. The council believed the move would save £800,000 a year as well as securing a team of officers some with higher levels of training and greater powers. Such a move meant the abolition of the Wandsworth Parks Police. There was opposition to this proposal. However, it went ahead on 1 April 2012, when the force was replaced by a Metropolitan Police Safer Parks Team.

Following the disbanding of the original Wandsworth Parks Police in 2012, the council retained five officers (1 inspector and 4 constables) within the newly formed Wandsworth Events Police Service (WEPS). The officers were still sworn under the same legislation and enjoyed the same powers as their predecessor unit. WEPS proved highly effective, and was at times contracted out to assist with specific local policing issues in other London boroughs.

The cost savings that were anticipated by the council, and used as a justification for disbanding the parks police, took no account of the cost of maintaining the 'new' constabulary. In 2015 the new unit was expanded back up to previous strength, and rebranded as the Wandsworth Parks and Events Police. It is led by an Inspector and a Sergeant.

== Rank structure and numbers ==
As of 2019 the Parks and Events Police has a team of 9 full-time attested constables (across all operational ranks), and half of the reserves contables, of whom half are attested.

The full breakdown of operational personnel is:

- 1 Chief Officer with the rank of Inspector
- 1 Deputy Chief Officer with the rank of Sergeant
- 1 Senior Constable
- 9 Full Time Constables,
- 15 Reserve Constables
- 4 Casual Police Support officers

Chief Officer (Parks Police Inspector)	Uk-police-03
Deputy Chief Officer (Parks Police Sergeant)	PS Epaulette
Parks Constable	PC Epaulette

There are additionally administrative and training staff.

== Training and awards ==
The Queen Elizabeth II Golden Jubilee Medal was awarded in 2002 to all Wandsworth Park Police constables who had completed more than five years service.

On 15 June 2016, eight members of Wandsworth Parks and Events Police, including their senior officer Inspector Stephen Biggs, became the first police officers to be awarded certificates for attaining a Level Five (the highest level) National Vocational Qualification in Event Safety and Policing.

In May 2017 four constables of the Wandsworth Parks and Events Police received bravery awards from the Mayor of Wandsworth, Councillor Richard Field, for their part in apprehending an armed suspect. The officers received the Award for Exemplary Performance in the Mayor's Parlour at the grade II listed Town Hall, opened in 1937 by Queen Mary.

The Parks and Events Police receive initial training and in-service re-training in:

- legal and enforcement processes;
- conflict resolution;
- personal safety;
- first aid, including the operation of defibrillator machines (which are carried in all of their vehicles).

== Operational duties ==
Officers of the Wandsworth Parks and Events Police (WPEP) carry out a range of duties within the Borough. Their primary work, as outlined above, is focused on community policing, and results in low numbers of arrests, and very little violence. A Freedom of Information enquiry in June 2017 revealed that WPEP officers had made a total of just 32 arrests in the preceding three years, and that force had not been used in connection with any of those arrests.

This coincides with a falling number of annual arrests in the predecessor units. The number of arrests made by the Wandsworth Parks Police dropped from 148 in 2000/2001 to 18 in 2010/2011. By 2017 the average number of arrests per year was only just over 10.

Primary duties include:

- Patrolling parks, commons, and open spaces within the Borough.
- Enforcing byelaws, dog control orders, and other park regulations.
- Parking, cycling, and public nuisance offences.
- Policing special events, particularly in Battersea Park.

Additional areas of responsibility for constables, include:

- Key holding and response to building alarms by day and night, including the search of premises with police dogs when alarms are activated.
- On site security and protection of Council staff, particularly in the Town Hall.
- Serving legal documentation on behalf of the Council and the Courts.
- Working together with other Council departments, the Metropolitan Police Service and the other emergency services in emergency management and civil defence.

== Headquarters ==
The headquarters of the Police Service is located in Battersea Park, and includes both the Inspector's office, and the modern operations and control centre. The headquarters is also home to administrative staff and Home Office qualified instructors.

== Uniform ==
According to a Freedom of Information enquiry in June 2017, each Wandsworth Parks and Events constable was at that time issued with operational uniform and equipment to a total value of just over £1,777.

The operational uniform consists of a police polo top, black trousers, black fleece jacket, high-visibility jacket, peaked cap, Magnum boots, gloves, body armour (stab vest), and an equipment-carrying police vest with handcuffs, a video camera, and a Motorola personal radio. Officers also carry a baton. The vests bear rank markings and collar numbers, on black rank slides, as well as an identifying patch with the Parks and Events Police badge and name.

There is also a formal uniform for official occasions consisting of a white shirt, black tie, dark blue or black tunic, and black trousers. Medal ribbons, if awarded, as well as rank markings (if any) are worn on the tunic.

== Equipment and batons ==
Parks and Events constables carry batons and handcuffs, when in uniform. Additionally they carry body worn video cameras, and personal Motorola radios. The powers of parks constables to carry batons was questioned by a local newspaper in 2007, and in that year the trade union UNISON advised its members not to carry them. Batons continued to be issued, and are routinely carried by all officers.

The Constables of Wandsworth Parks Police were trained to Home Office standard to carry Monadnock batons. Wandsworth Council received their own legal opinion in November 2001 stating that carrying such equipment was legal. However, a report for Newham Council and a legal opinion for Barking and Dagenham Council contradicts this. This opinion stated that there was no "lawful authority" for parks constables to carry batons. They also trained with and carried rigid handcuffs.

Queen's Counsel Advice to Newham Council in 2007 stated that Parks Constables have lawful authority to carry batons as they are exercising powers under section 24 of the Police and Criminal Evidence Act 1984 (P.A.C.E.) and are therefore protected to carry such equipment under section 117 of P.A.C.E and Section 3 CLA 1967; the protection to carry such equipment is also afforded to officers in the Border Force and any person carrying out arrest powers such as Water Bailiffs and ports and Harbours Police.

The powers of Parks Constables are complex in that many of the provisions of arrest were updated by Section 26(1) of P.A.C.E 1984 and much of the negative denial of powers of Parks Constables was due to poor research and a poor understanding of the definition of the status of constables at law.

Parks Constables exercise powers under Section 24 of P.A.C.E and are therefore protected under the provisions of Section 117 of P.A.C.E, whilst enforcing byelaws, regulations, and enactments relating to open spaces. Parks Constables have all the powers of a Constable to enforce the above, albeit within a limited jurisdiction. Nevertheless, they are constables for this purpose and therefore have all the protections for constables whilst carrying out these duties. There is no office of "Police Officer" in English law, but only the office of Constable, and although a constable's jurisdiction may be limited they are nevertheless constables as defined by law, with the protection such an office brings.

== Police dog section ==
Police dogs had a vital role in the work of the Wandsworth Parks Police, assisting police officers in routine work. General purpose police dogs were German Shepherds, Bouvier des Flandres and Malinois. Drug search dogs were Border Collie and Labradors.

Wandsworth Parks and Events Police also operate a dog unit, using a Ford Transit Connect police dog van.

== Vehicles ==
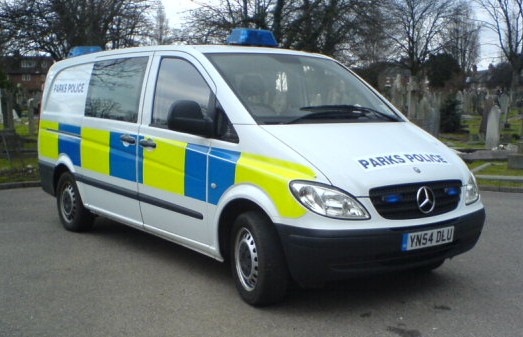
A parks police van.

The Parks and Events Police operate at least three marked police vehicles, carrying the service crest as part of the livery. They are

- one Ford Transit Custom, with blue LED flashing lights and CCTV recording.
- one Mercedes-Benz Vito van, fitted with blue flashing lights.
- one Ford Transit Connect dog unit, fitted with blue flashing lights.

The motor vehicles used by the Wandsworth Parks and Events Police are fitted with blue flashing strobe lights, alternating headlamps, and sirens. Wandsworth Council has stated that their use is in accordance with the Road Vehicles Lighting Regulations 1989, as amended, which permit blue lights to be fitted to emergency vehicles that are used for police purposes.

== Legal status ==
The Constables are sworn in under Article 18 of the Ministry of Housing and Local Government Provisional Order Confirmation (Greater London Parks and Open Spaces) Act 1967. This states that:

A local authority may procure officers appointed by them, for securing the observance of the provisions of all enactments relating to open spaces under their control or management and of bye-laws and regulations made thereunder, to be sworn in as a constable for that purpose but any such officer shall not act as a Constable unless in uniform or provided with a warrant.

This gives the powers of a Constable whilst enforcing open space law, including bye-laws and regulations. This includes the power under the Road Traffic Act 1988 to stop a vehicle driving onto common land. Other powers used by the Constables are set out in Sections 24 and 24A of the Police and Criminal Evidence Act 1984 (PACE) as amended by section 110 of the Serious Organised Crime and Police Act 2005.

When on or off duty and they see an offence being committed that is not in breach of the open spaces laws, they may only arrest using 'other person powers' (commonly known as citizen's arrest) given under Section 24a of PACE.

Wandsworth council's opinions on the stop and search powers of Parks Police constables differed. One report stated that they had no such powers, whereas a later report said they had search powers only upon arrest for breach of bylaws, under Section 1 of PACE. However, the post-arrest power of searching was derived from Section 32 of PACE which allows those that are arrested to be searched:

"Section 32(1): A constable may search an arrested person, in any case where the person to be searched has been arrested at a place other than a police station, if the constable has reasonable grounds for believing that the arrested person may present a danger to himself or others.

"Section 32(2) Subject to subsections (3) to (5) below, a constable shall also have power in any such case-

(a) to search the arrested person for anything:

(i) which he might use to assist him to escape from lawful custody; or

(ii) which might be evidence relating to an offence"

It would seem that these constables did have such a power. However, if they seized evidence in relation to a suspected offence of which they did not have jurisdiction then they still had a power of seizure, although they were required to hand the evidence over to a local police officer for consideration of arrest.

Regardless of their status as Constables, they are also council officers and as such could enforce legislation which only Local Authority Officers are able to enforce for prosecution.

Like other parks police services, Wandsworth Parks and Events Police is not a territorial police service. Their officers, in both plain clothes and uniform, enforce bye-laws and other enactments relating to open spaces, and are categorised as a miscellaneous police service.

== See also ==
- Wandsworth parks and open spaces
