= St Andrew's, Earlsfield =

Church in Earlsfield, London, England

Coordinates: 51.4402°N 0.1865°W

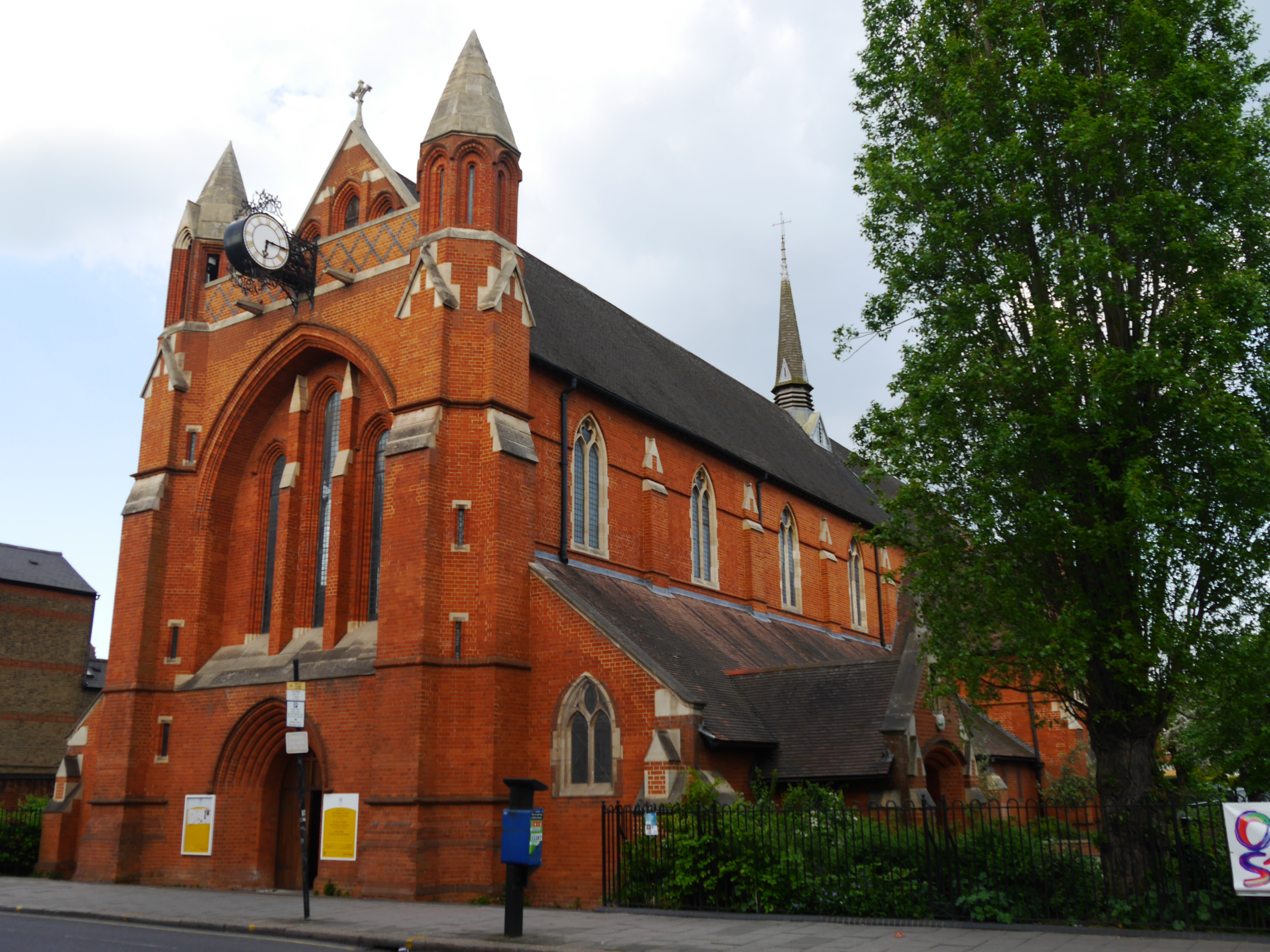
St Andrew's, Earlsfield

St Andrew's, Earlsfield, is an Anglican church at 571 Garratt Lane, Earlsfield, London.

It was built in 1889–90, and the architect was Edward William Mountford. It is a Grade II listed building since 2000.
