= Wandsworth Quaker Meeting House =

Quaker meeting house in London

- Wandsworth Friends Meeting House
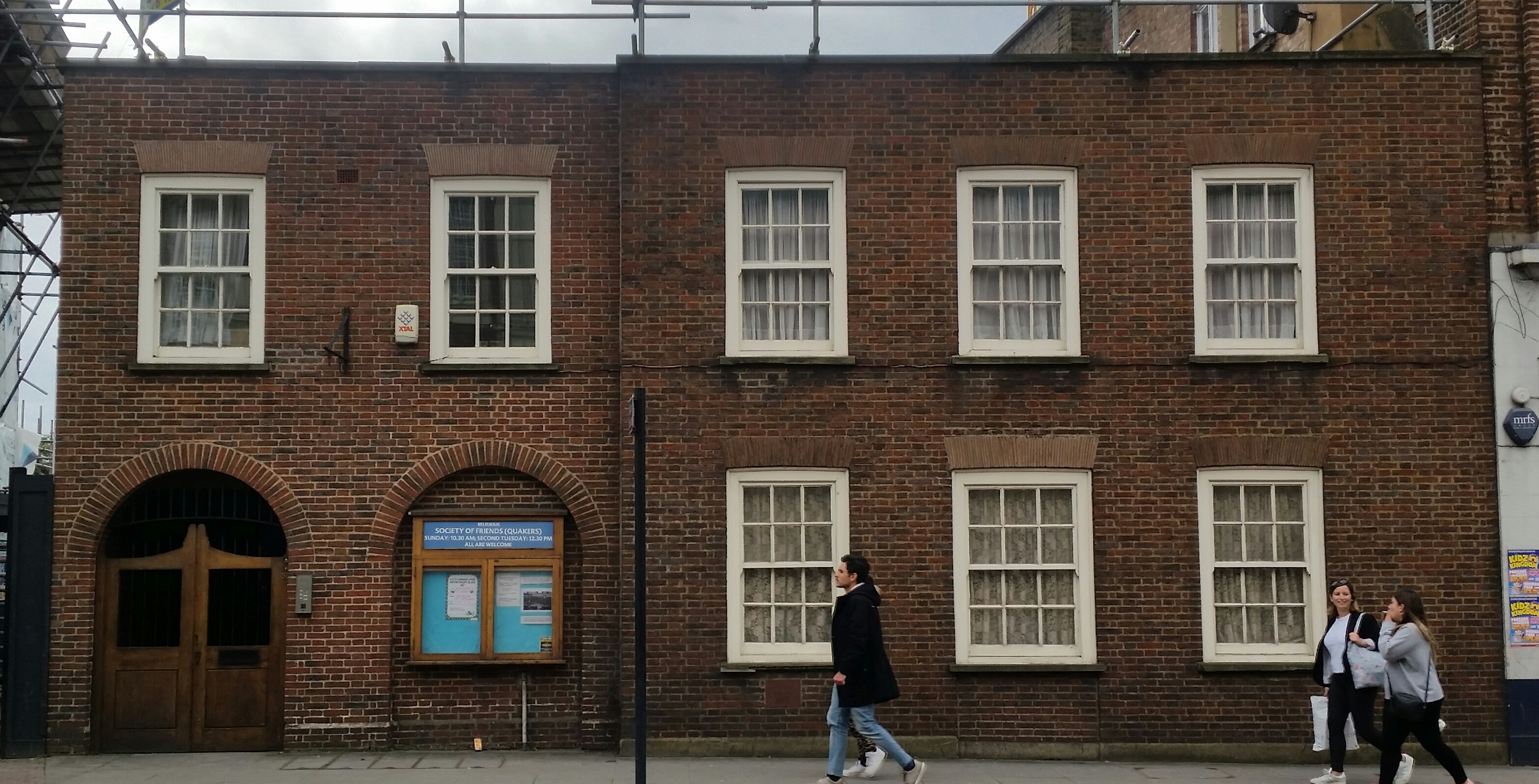
- Wandsworth Quaker Meeting House
- 51°27′23.8″N 0°11′30.2″W
- Location: Wandsworth High Street, Wandsworth, London, United Kingdom
- Address: 59 Wandsworth High Street, London, SW18 2PT
- Denomination: Quaker
- Website: https://wandsworth.quakermeeting.org/

History
- Status: Active

Architecture
- Style: Neo-Georgian
- Completed: 1778
- Construction cost: about £600

Listed Building – Grade II
- Official name: Wandsworth Quaker Meeting House including frontage building and boundary walls
- Designated: 7 April 1983
- Reference no.: 1299826

Wandsworth Quaker Meeting House is a Grade II listed religious building in Wandsworth. It was built in 1778 and is the earliest surviving Quaker meeting house in Greater London.

The building is noted by commentators such as John Summerson as a "building of endearing simplicity".

== History ==
Quakers first met on the site of the Wandsworth meeting house in 1673, subletting a small house, a shop and three sheds on the site from a Joan Stringer and adapting it into a meeting house. Notable members of this early meeting include William Mead, tried for unlawful assembly in 1670, and William Penn, later founder of Pennsylvania. There is a burial ground to the rear of the meeting house, and a memorial stone of 1697 records Joan Stringer as "the giver of the ground".

This first meeting house was demolished and replaced by the current building in 1778, at a cost of about £600. Several alterations have been made since it has been built including a women's meeting room, added in either 1798 or around 1811. It has been in continuous use since its foundation.

== The building today ==
The meeting house continues to be the meeting place for Wandsworth Quaker Meeting, which is itself part of Kingston & Wandsworth Area Meeting.

The meeting house is one of the buildings which opens for the public as part of the Open House London festival. As well as being used for Quaker meetings for worship, it is also used for meetings by other Christian worshiping groups, community support groups, and the Wandsworth Historical Society.

== Gallery ==
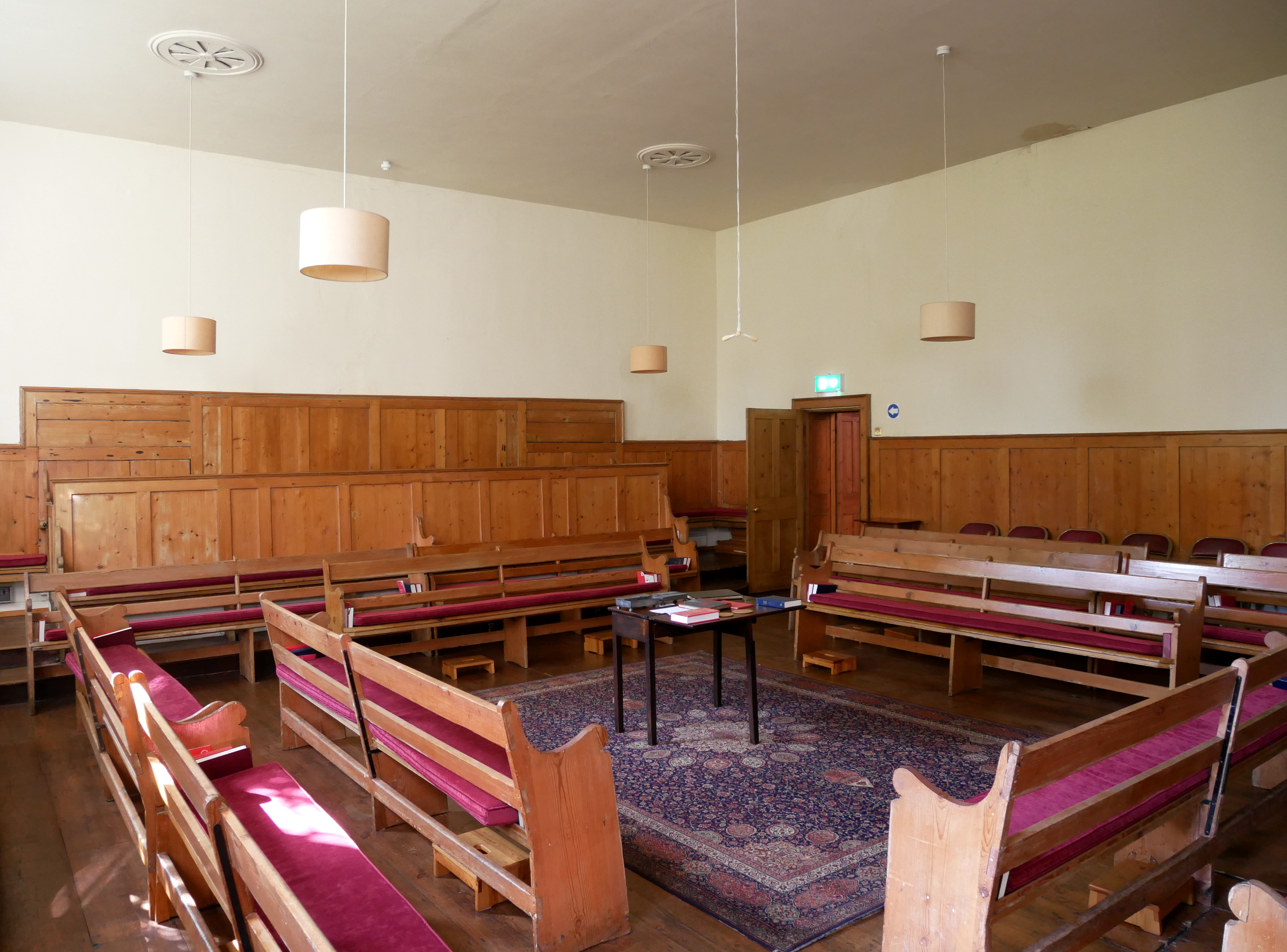
The main room of the meeting house.

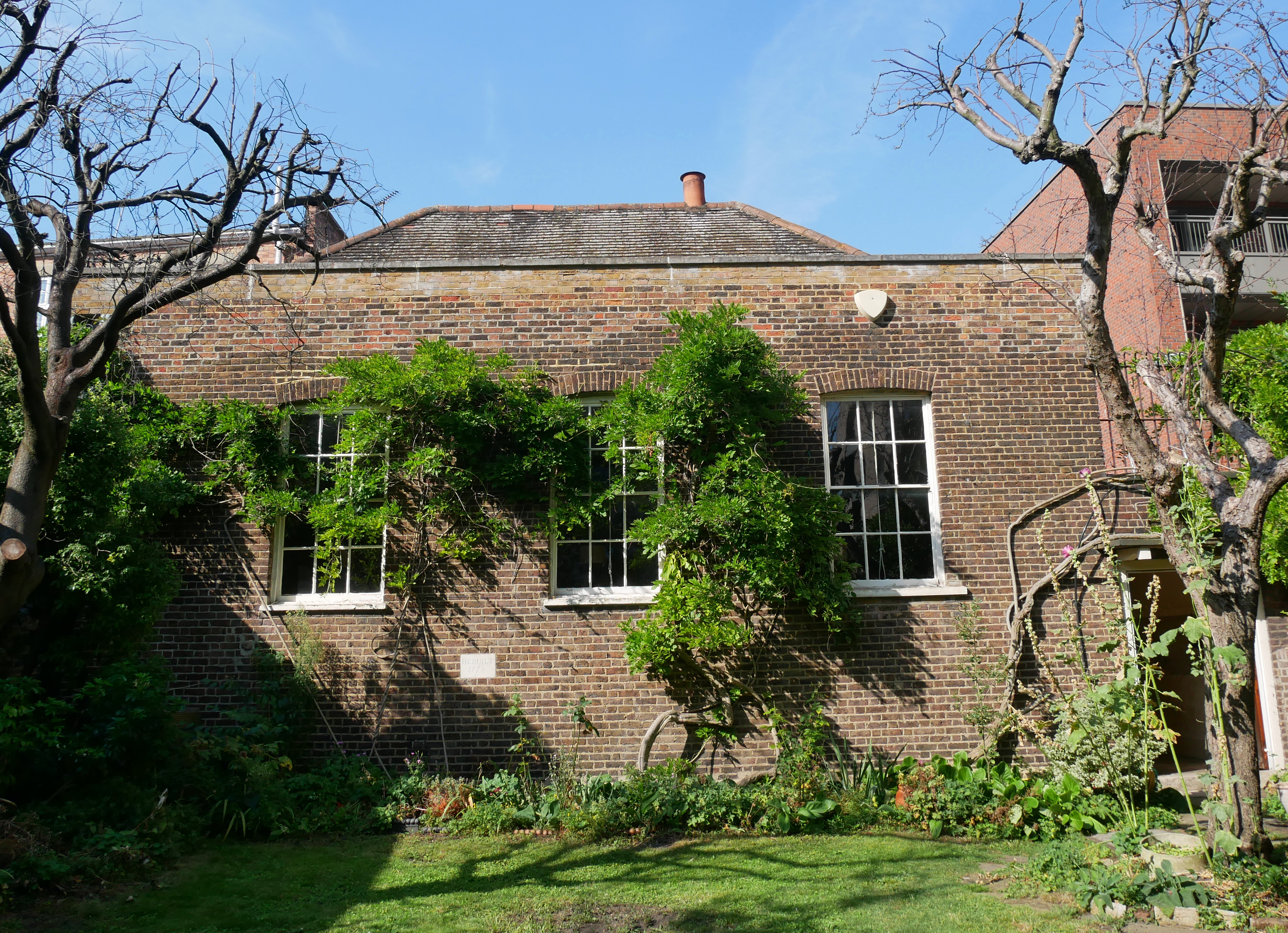
The south face of the meeting house.

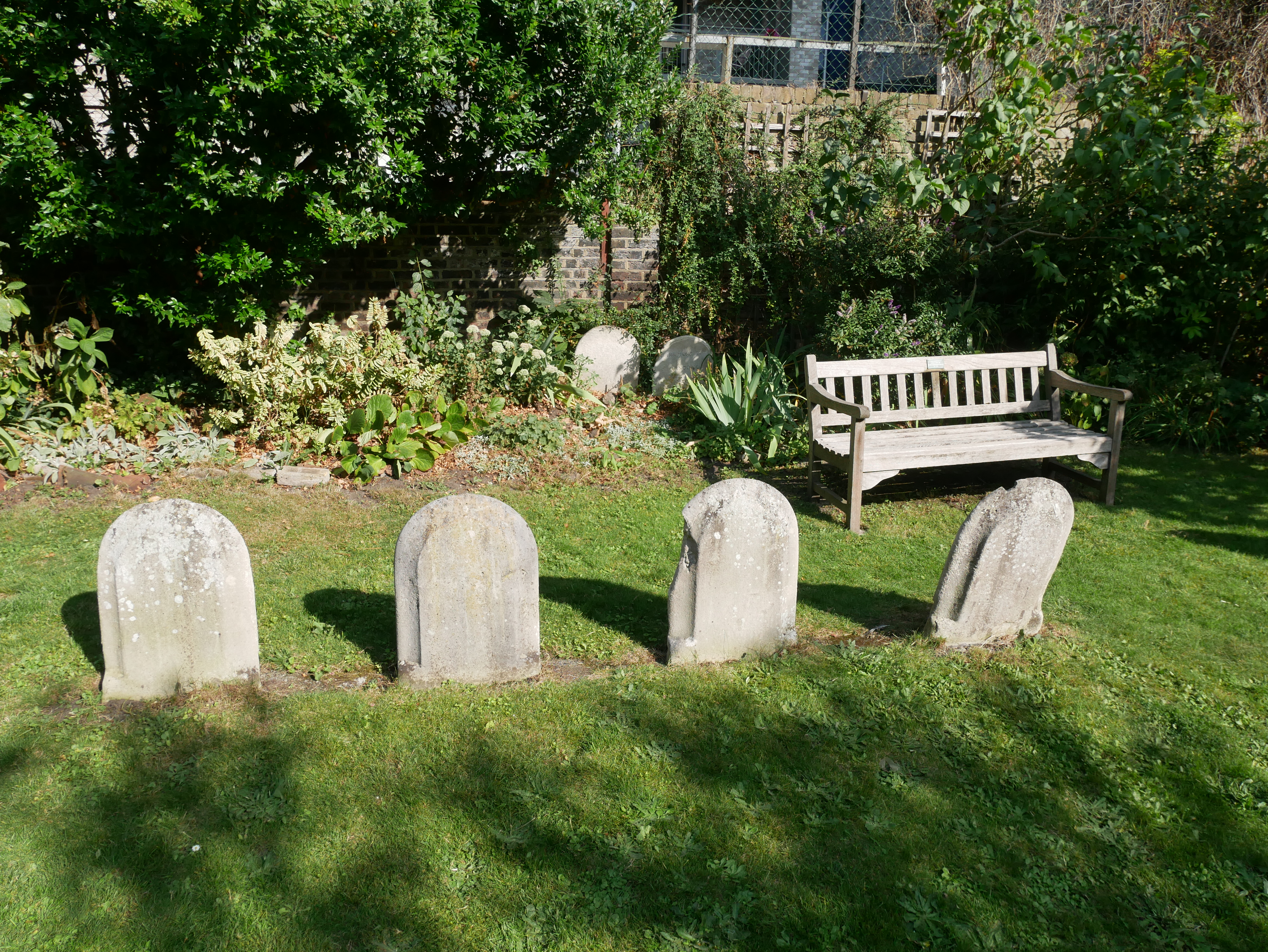
Headstones in the burial ground of the meeting house.
