= Sunday Morning at the Centre of the World (play for voices) =

Radio drama by Louis de Bernieres

First edition (publ. Vintage Books)

Sunday Morning at the Centre of the World is a 1999 play by Louis de Bernières, originally written for radio, and described by de Bernières as a play for voices.

It was broadcast on BBC Radio 3 on 22 March 1999. It was first performed on stage live at Southwark Playhouse in 2011.

It is a popular text for A-level or GCSE courses in drama or performing arts.

Sunday Morning has a diverse cast of people of different ethnic and social backgrounds and dramatises their interactions and, sometimes dramatic, confrontations.

The play was inspired by Dylan Thomas's Under Milk Wood and drew on its author's own experience of living above a shop in the south London community of Earlsfield for several years.
