= Wandsworth Common =

Park in Wandsworth, London

Coordinates: 51.450°N 0.1695°W

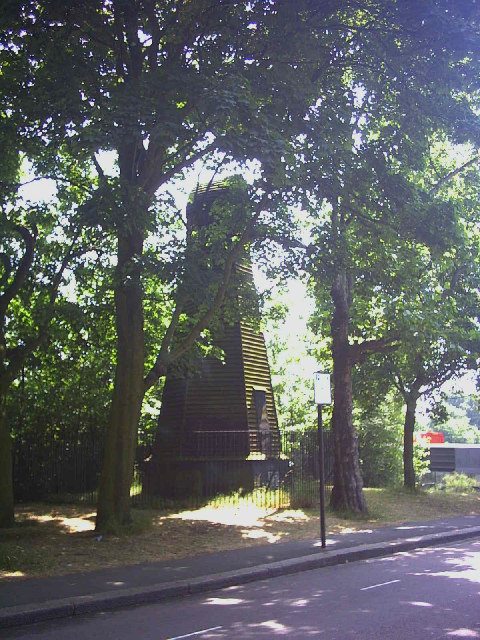
Wandsworth Common Windmill

Wandsworth Common is a public common in Wandsworth, in the London Borough of Wandsworth, south London. It is 69.43 hectares (171.6 acres) and is maintained and regulated by Wandsworth Council. It is also a Ward of the London Borough of Wandsworth. The population of the ward at the 2011 Census was 15,247.

== Amenities ==
There are a number of ponds and a lake, which can be used for fishing (with a permit). The lake is partially fenced off for the benefit of bird life, while other areas feature wooden pedestrian board walks, or open water's edge access. A small brick bridge crosses over the lake's waters at one point, connecting two pedestrian pathways. A railway line running between Clapham Junction and Wandsworth Common railway stations broadly divides the common into two strips, west and east. A footbridge crosses the railway approximately halfway along the length of the open part of the common. To the east of the railway line there is a large area which is mainly used for competitive sports (mostly football, touch rugby and rounders).

Facilities include an educational centre, tennis courts, a bowling green and a cafe bar in the grounds, named 'The Skylark'. A fitness trail has been developed and the Common is popular with local runners, dog walkers and cyclists. Wandsworth Common is also home to The Lady Allen Adventure Playground for children with disabilities and their siblings.

On the other side of Trinity Road is in an area dedicated to wildlife known locally as 'The Scope' (named after the Craig telescope, which was once the largest refracting telescope in the world).

Houses on the main common Wandsworth (SW18) side are in what is known as the 'Toast Rack' and are large Victorian semis and detached homes, some with blue plaques commemorating notable residents who previously lived there, including the British prime minister David Lloyd George.

== Wandsworth Common Tennis & Bowls Centre ==
Wandsworth Common Tennis & Bowls Centre allows Tennis & Bowls on a 'Pay and Play' basis including Tennis Coaching opportunities for all. The tennis centre is run by All Star Coaching Ltd for Wandsworth Council. It is situated behind the Common Ground cafe bar and is LTA affiliated, allowing those who sign up to gain free British Tennis Membership. Membership also allows use of Battersea Park, King George's Park, Tooting Common and Barn Elms Sports Centre.
