= Southfields Academy =

Location
- 333 Merton Road; Wandsworth, London, SW18 5JU; England
- Coordinates: 51.445°N 0.197°W

Information
- Type: Academy
- Motto: Carpe diem
- Department for Education URN: 138682 Tables
- Ofsted: Reports
- Principal: Jacqueline Valin
- Headteacher: Wanda Golinska
- Age: 11 to 18
- Enrolment: c1680
- Colours: Year 7 – Year 9 wear blue and gold ties, Year 10 wear black and gold ties & Year 11 wear gold ties.
- Website: www.southfieldsacademy.com

Southfields Academy (formerly Southfields Community College) is a secondary school and sixth form with academy status in Southfields (Wandsworth), south west London. It has about 1300 students.

Southfields Academy has been rated by Ofsted as either Outstanding or Good since 2001. British Prime Minister Theresa May visited school in 2019 to promote her plan to improve mental health care. Southfields Academy provides the education for AFC Wimbledon’s academy players.

Former Education Secretary and local MP, Justine Greening is a regular visitor and supporter of the school.

== Facilities ==
The academy has a hearing support center for deaf young people.

The International Group at the academy admits students from abroad; some the children of diplomats or economic migrants. Each year the International Group enrols a number of young people who are unaccompanied refugees.

The academy also has a resource base for students who have a Statement of Special Educational Needs or Education Health and Care Plan for:

- Speech, Language Communication Needs
- Autistic Spectrum Disorders

== In popular culture ==
- About a Boy starring Hugh Grant was filmed inside the school (the interior shots).
- Louis de Bernières, author of Captain Corelli's Mandolin, used to teach at the school.

== Notable alumni ==
- Jessica George New York Times bestselling author
- Louis de Bernières Former teacher and author
- Alan Pardew Professional football manager
- Michail Antonio Professional footballer
- Malachi Kirby Actor
- Paul Osew Professional footballer

== Aspire at Southfields ==
Aspire @ Southfields is the umbrella under which it operates all its community services, including Adult Learning, Extended Services and Community Sport and Leisure provision. There are classes and courses for the public during the day, in the evenings and at weekends. Individuals and clubs can also book to use the sports facilities. Membership of the Aspire Centre gives people access to the Fitness Suite and gives them subsidised rates on all courses and classes plus facility hire.

Nursery @ Aspire is based at the academy. It is a nursery for pre-school children.
