= Tara Arts Group =

British Asian theatre company

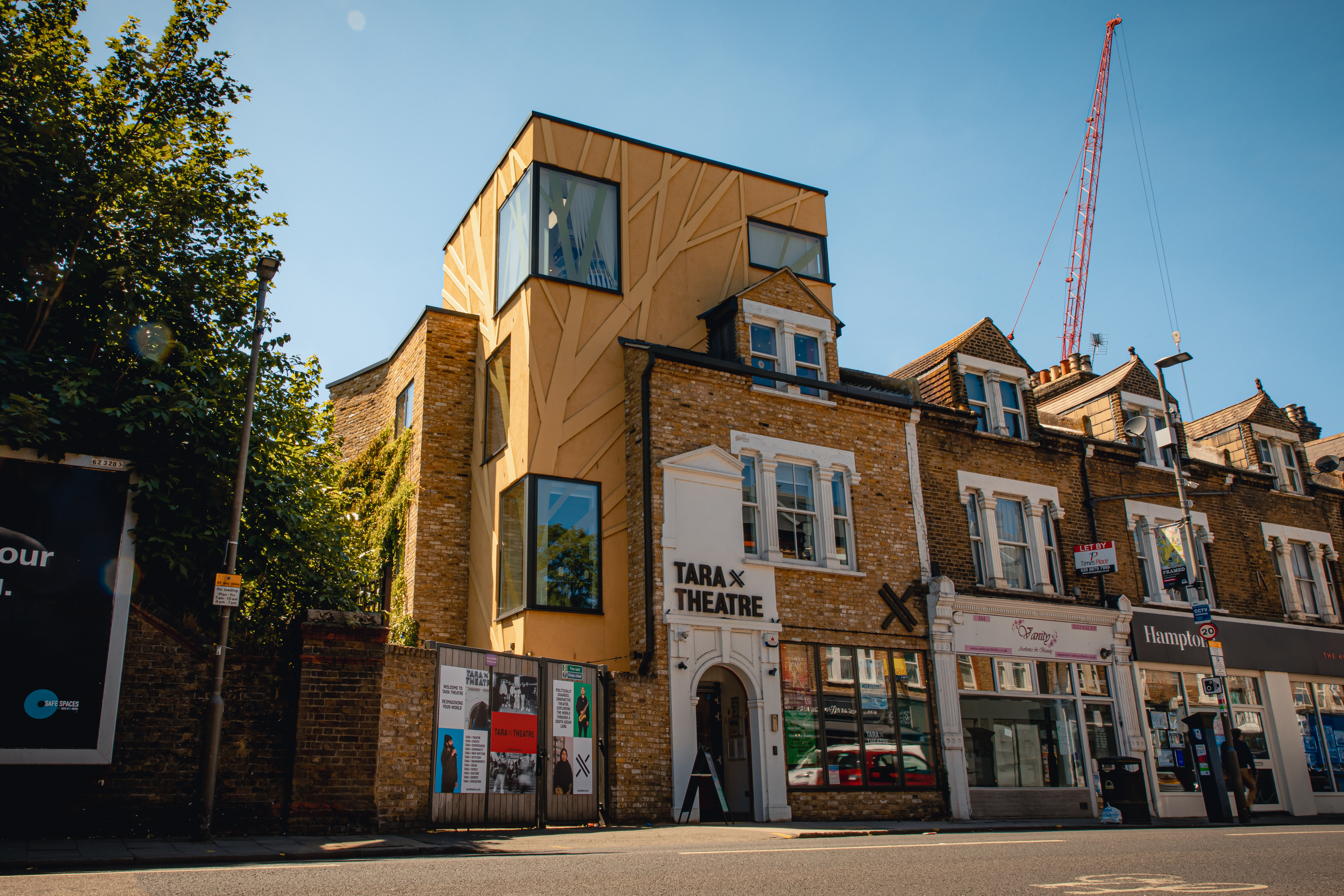
- Tara Arts Group's headquarters in Earlsfield (2022)
- Trade name: Tara Theatre
- Company type: Private
- Industry: Performing arts
- Founded: 1977
- Founder: several, including Jatinder Verma
- Headquarters: Tara Theatre, 356 Garratt Lane, London, United Kingdom
- Number of employees: 9 (2024)
- Subsidiaries: Tara Productions Limited, Tara Enterprises Limited
- Website: https://taratheatre.com/

Tara Arts Group is a British Asian theatre company in London. It is based in the Tara Theatre in Earlsfield, and is one of Britain's oldest Asian theatre groups. The company is known for its "Binglish" theatre form, which aims to "directly challenge or provoke the dominant conventions of the English stage".

== History ==
Tara Arts Group was co-founded by five Asian students, including Jatinder Verma, in 1977, in response to the racist murder of Gurdip Singh Chaggar, a Sikh teenager, in Southall. Its first production, of the play Sacrifice by Rabindranath Tagore, was held at the Battersea Arts Centre in 1977. Other productions include an adaptation of The Merchant of Venice performed in 2005, an adaptation of The Tempest performed in 2008, and an adaptation of Macbeth performed in 2015 which employed hijras in place of the three witches.

Tara Arts Group located to its Garratt Lane building in 1983, which was then known as the Tara Arts Centre. The building reopened in 2007 as a theatre venue. Permission was granted in 2012 to refurbish the building into a 100-seat theatre. Refurbishment works completed in 2016 at a cost of £2.7 million, and the new building was officially opened by the Mayor of London, Sadiq Khan. In 2020, the Mayor of London approved a grant of up to £180,000 to secure the Tara Theatre building, citing Tara Arts being the only BAME-led theatre group in London which has its own building.

== Recognition ==
In 2023, Tara Theatre was awarded the Digital Innovation Award at the UK Theatre Awards. It was also recognised by The Stage on its 2023 The Stage 100 list.
