= Wandsworth =

District of London, England

Coordinates: 51.455°N 0.192°W

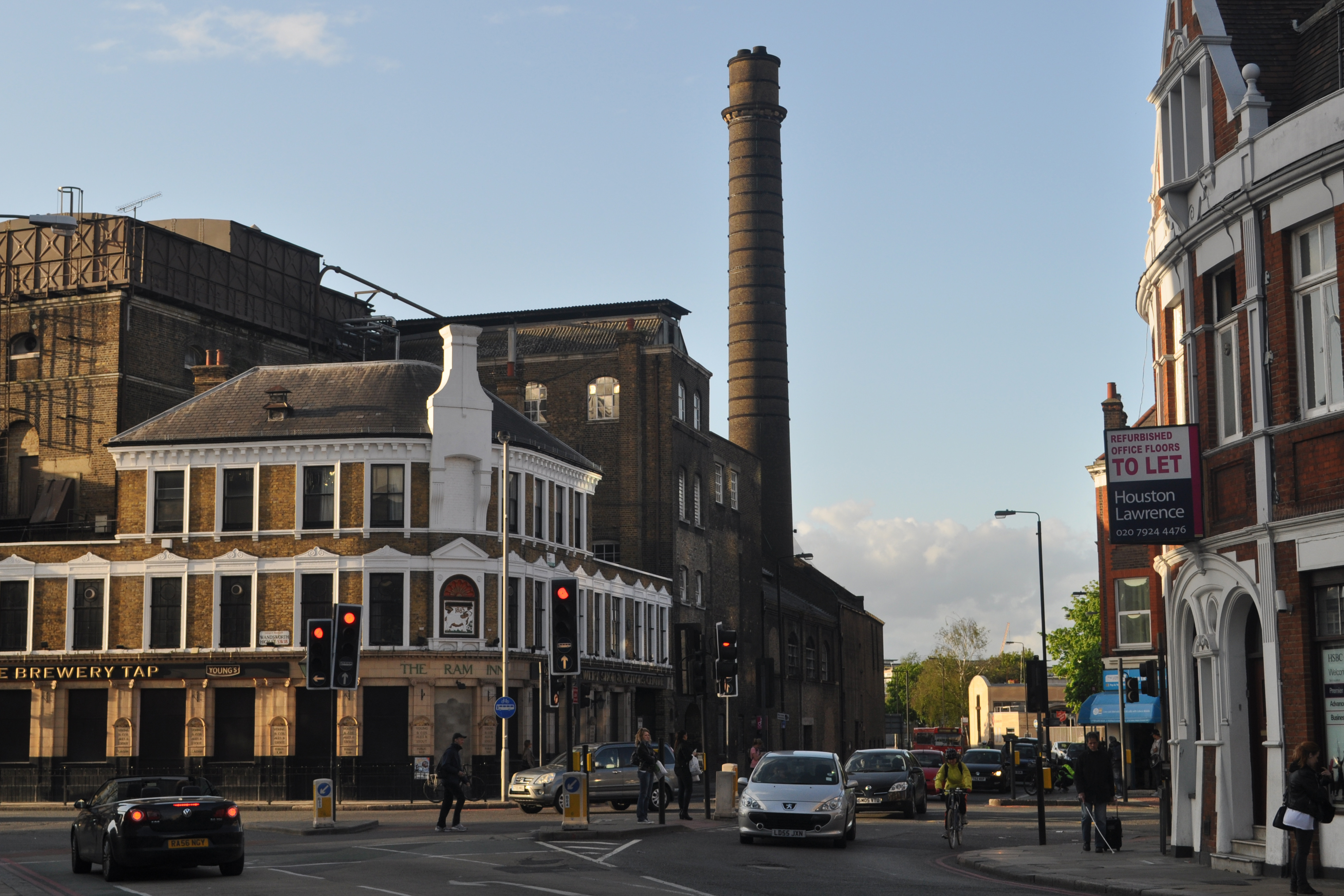
- The former Ram Brewery, a landmark in Wandsworth's town centre

- Location within Greater London
- OS grid reference: TQ255755
  - Charing Cross: 4.2 mi (6.8 km) NE
- London borough: Wandsworth
- Ceremonial county: Greater London
- Region: London
- Country: England
- Sovereign state: United Kingdom
- Post town: London
- Postcode district: SW18
- Dialling code: 020
- Police: Metropolitan
- Fire: London
- Ambulance: London
- UK Parliament: Putney; Tooting; Battersea
- London Assembly: Merton and Wandsworth

Wandsworth (/ˈwɒnzwərθ/) is a district of South London, within the London Borough of Wandsworth 4.2 miles (6.8 km) southwest of Charing Cross. The area is identified in the London Plan as one of 35 major centres in Greater London.

== Toponymy ==
Wandsworth takes its name from the River Wandle, which enters the Thames at Wandsworth. Wandsworth appears in Domesday Book of 1086 as Wandesorde and Wendelesorde. This means 'enclosure of (a man named) Waendel', whose name is also lent to the River Wandle. To distinguish it from the London Borough of Wandsworth, and historically from the Wandsworth District of the Metropolis and the Metropolitan Borough of Wandsworth, which all covered larger areas, it is also known as Wandsworth Town.

== History ==
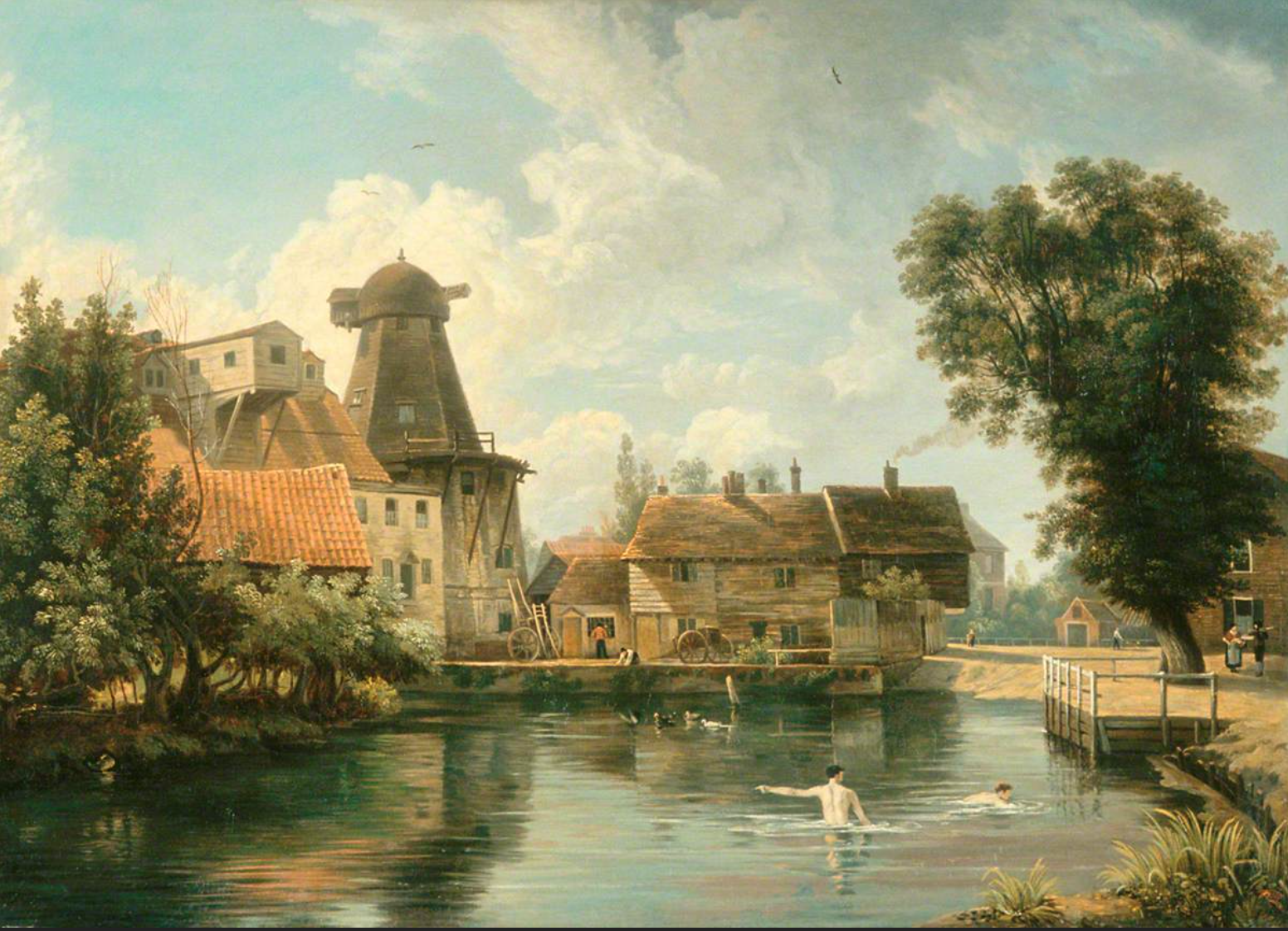
Middle Mill, Wandsworth by George Vincent (1796–1839), Government Art Collection

At the time of the Domesday Book (1086), the manor of Wandsworth was held partly by William, son of Ansculfy, and partly by St Wandrille's Abbey. Its Domesday assets were 12 hides, with 5 1/2 ploughs and 22 acres (89,000 m^{2}) of meadow. It rendered £9. Since at least the early 16th century, Wandsworth has offered accommodation to consecutive waves of immigration, from Protestant Dutch metalworkers fleeing persecution in the 1590s, Huguenots in the 17th century, to recent Eastern European members of the European Union.

A map showing the wards of Wandsworth Metropolitan Borough as they appeared in 1916.

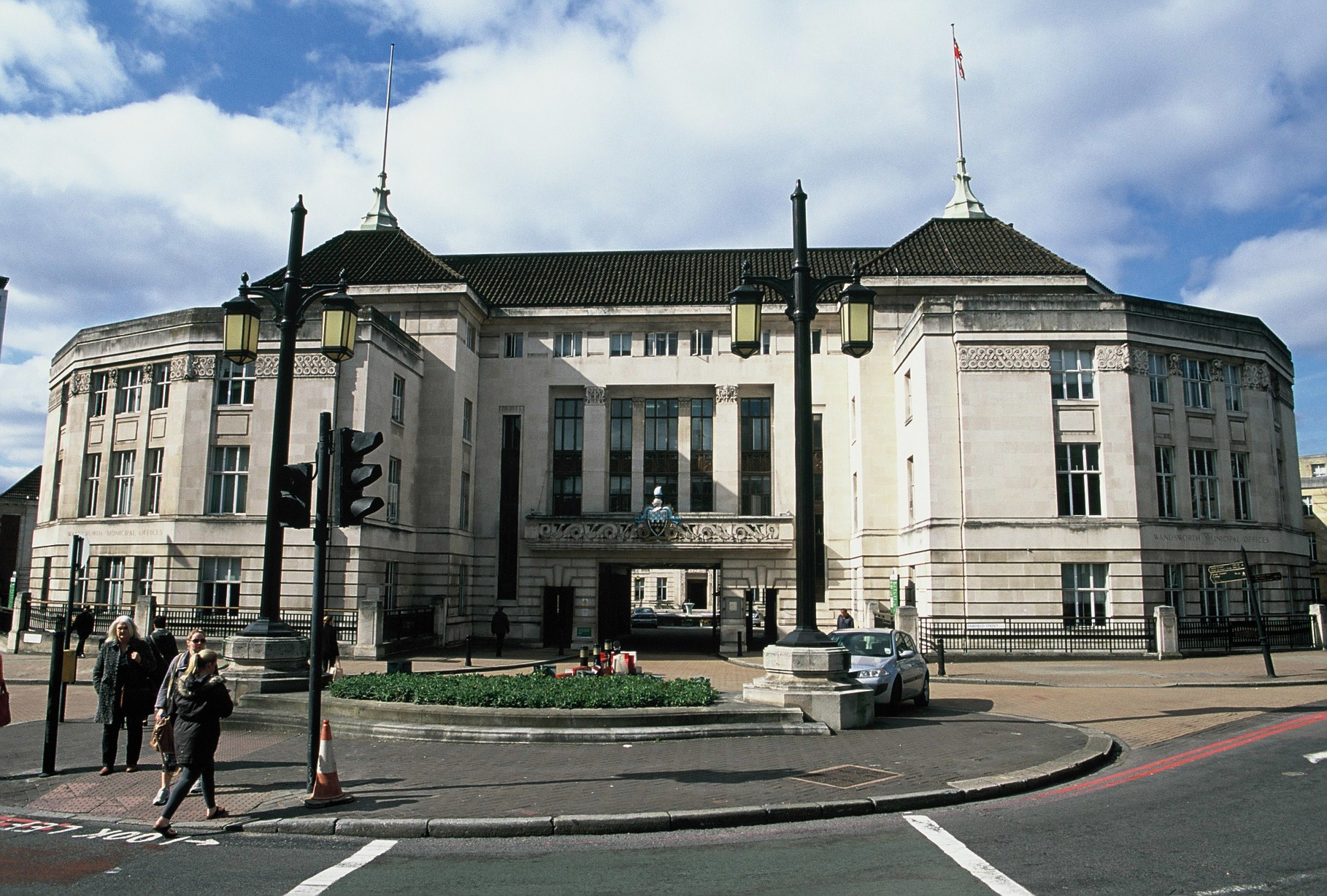
Wandsworth Town Hall

=== Brewing ===
Between Wandsworth town centre and the river is the site of Young & Co's Ram Brewery. Shire horse-drawn brewery drays were still used to deliver beer to local pubs. Whilst brewing by Young's stopped in September 2006 when Young & Co merged its operations with Charles Wells of Bedford, brewing does continue on the site by a master brewer albeit in small amounts. A planning application to redevelop the site for residential and shopping/leisure "mixed use" was submitted in 2012 and approved in 2013. In 2019 it was announced that Sambrook's Brewery will continue to brew beer on the site moving from their brewhouse on York Road in 2020 with John Hatch (former master brewer of Youngs Brewery) taking an active role in tours.

=== Gas and power ===
Wandsworth gas plant was built in 1834 against the River Thames near Wandsworth Bridge. The undertaking became the Wandsworth and Putney Gaslight and Coke Company in 1854 and was incorporated by an act of Parliament, the Wandsworth and Putney Gas Act 1856 (19 & 20 Vict. c. lxii). Coal for making coal gas was brought by sea from North East England and unloaded on the Thames beside the gasworks. The firm grew by a series of mergers and takeovers so that by 1936 it served a considerable area of south-west London. The company's name evolved each time it merged with or took over neighbouring gas companies, but from 1936 it was the Wandsworth and District Gas Company. The company was nationalised in 1949 and became part of the South Eastern Gas Board.

Wandsworth power station was built on The Causeway and supplied electricity to the district of Wandsworth from 1897 to 1964. It was owned and operated by the County of London Electric Supply Company Limited until the nationalisation of the British electricity supply industry in 1948. The power station was decommissioned in 1964. There is an operational 132 kV national grid substation to the east of the River Wandle.

=== World War I: The Wandsworth Battalion ===
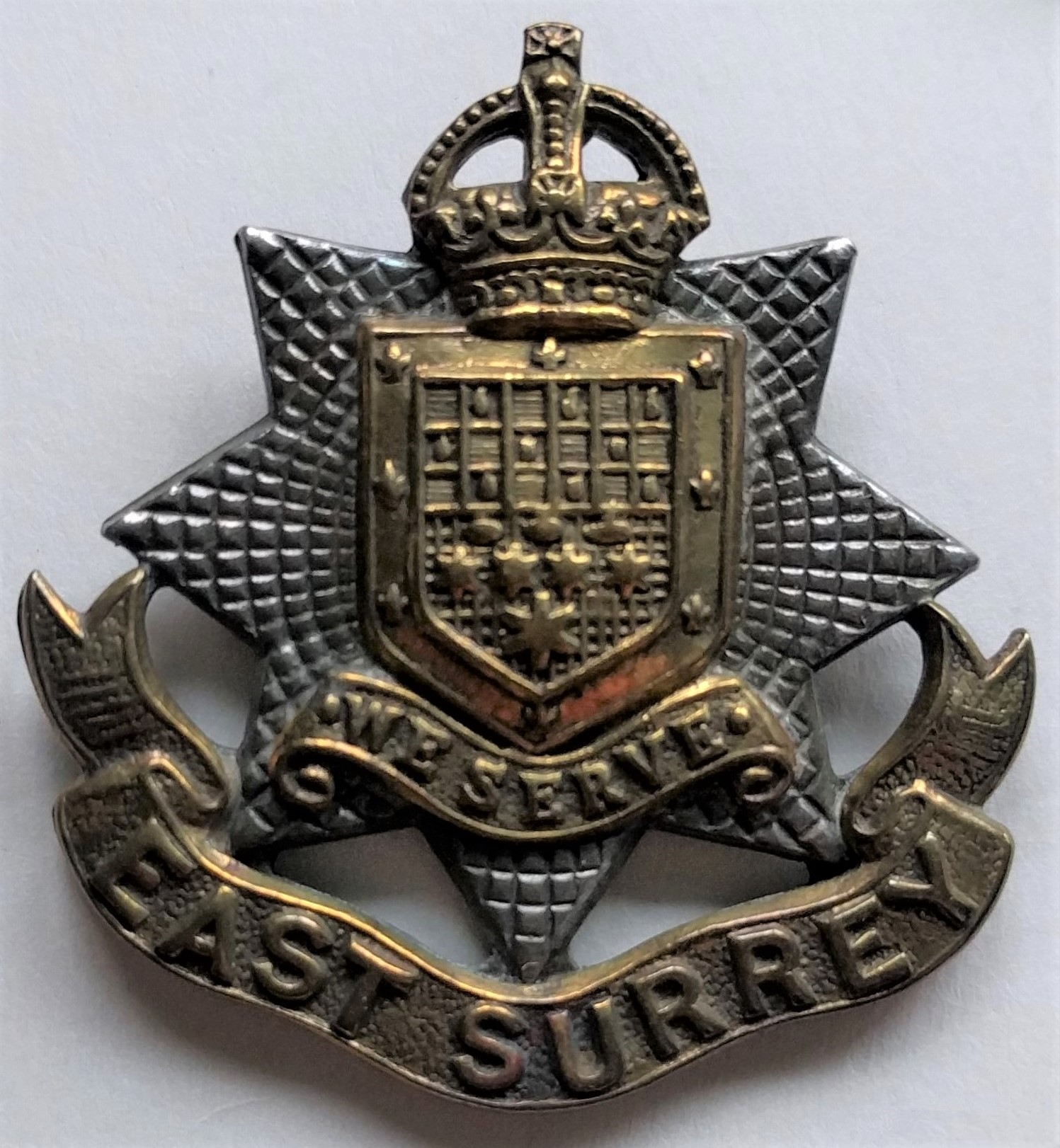
Cap badge of the 13th East Surreys, incorporating the arms of Wandsworth.

On the outbreak of World War I in August 1914 Lord Kitchener issued his famous call to arms: 'Your King and Country Need You'. The flood of volunteers overwhelmed the ability of the Army to absorb them, and units began to be raised by local initiative from men who wished to serve together: these were known as 'pals battalions'. The 'pals' phenomenon quickly spread across the country, and Kitchener approached the mayors of the 28 Metropolitan boroughs of the County of London to raise units of local men.

Alderman Archibald Dawnay, Mayor of Wandsworth, raised a complete infantry battalion, the 13th (Service) Battalion, East Surrey Regiment (Wandsworth), which served on the Western Front. On 24 April 1917 the battalion distinguished itself in an attack on the fortified village of Villers-Plouich, in which Corporal Edward 'Tiny' Foster, a Wandsworth Council dustman in civilian life, won the Victoria Cross. It also fought at the Capture of Bourlon Wood. Most of the battalion was overrun and captured during the German spring offensive of 1918, and the remnant became a training unit.

After the war, Wandsworth raised money for the rebuilding of Villers-Plouich and the unofficial twinning was revived in the 1990s. Among the memorial tablets in the garden of Wandsworth Town Hall are those to the 13th Battalion, 'The Wandsworth Regulars', and to Corporal Foster, after whom a path in King George's Park is named.

== Geography ==
The former wharf area of the river-front is now lined with apartment blocks, with several bars and restaurants including near the Wandsworth Bridge.

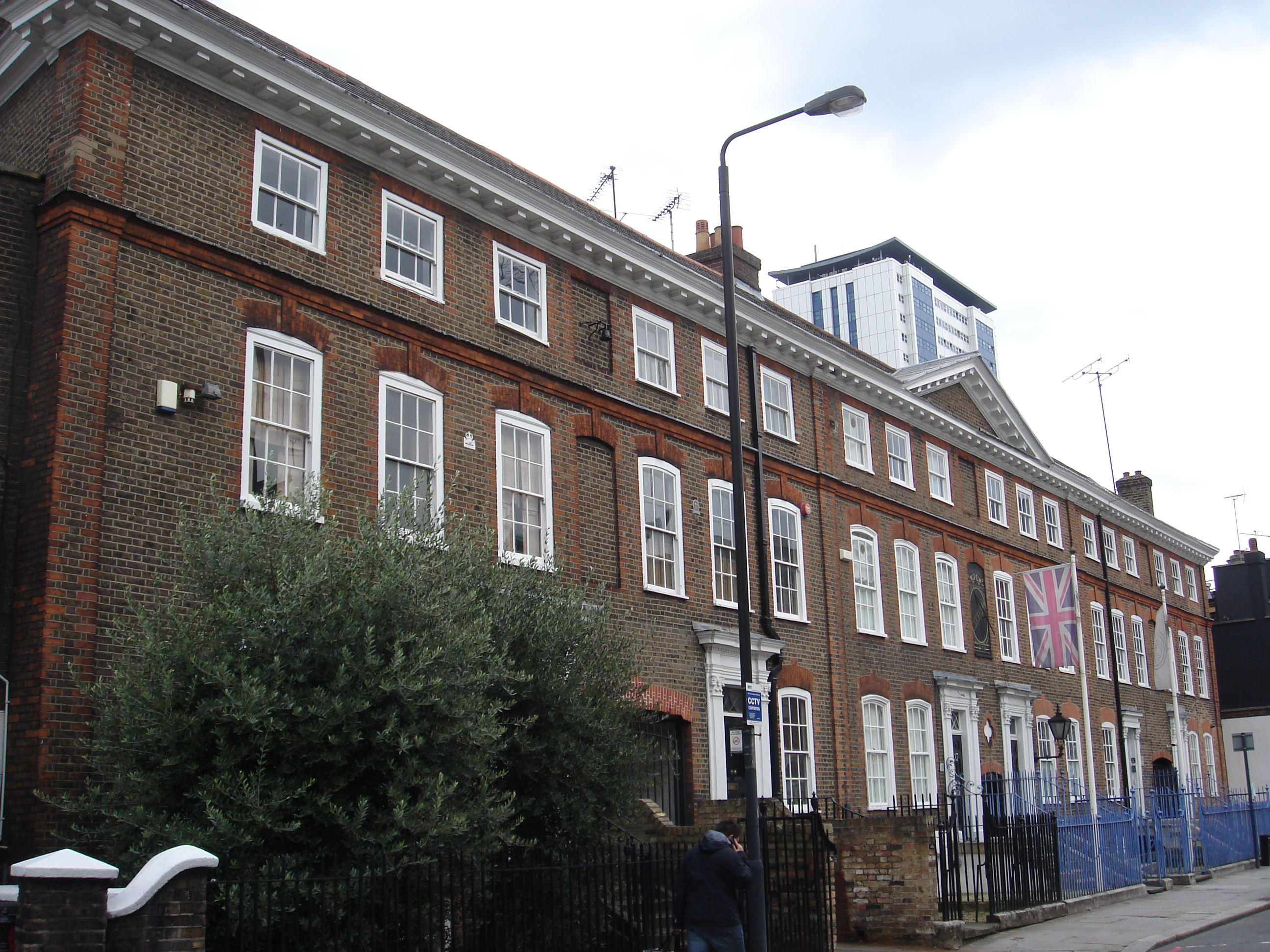
Church Row, 1–6, Wandsworth Plain, London SW18

Wandsworth Common is set back from the river, at the top of East Hill, and is adjoined by an area known locally as "the Toast Rack" that has some of the most expensive townhouses in London, as well as the restaurant Chez Bruce, formerly Harveys, where chef Gordon Ramsay learned his trade, and for which co-owner Bruce Poole gained a Michelin star in 1999. Also in the area is the Royal Victoria Patriotic Building, which now contains flats, a theatre school and a restaurant.

The Tonsleys/Old York Road is a residential area of old Wandsworth close to the river and town centre, so called because many of the street names have the word "Tonsley" included. The area has three notable pubs: the Royal Standard, the East Hill and the Alma. East Hill is an area of large Victorian houses bordered by the west side of Wandsworth Common. From 2007 to 2014 the area was used as the location for the BBC TV series Outnumbered.

Wandsworth High Street is dominated by the Southside shopping centre, cinema and restaurant complex (formerly called the Arndale Centre). Behind the shopping centre, and following the River Wandle upstream towards Earlsfield and further south to Wimbledon, is King George's Park.

Wandsworth Museum previously occupied the former Victorian library in West Hill having been moved there in 2007. The museum closed in March 2015. The De Morgan Centre was previously situated in Wandsworth Museum and housed a collection of Victorian artwork. A green plaque to commemorate aviation pioneer Alliott Verdon Roe was unveiled by Wandsworth Council and members of the Verdon-Roe family beside the A3 close to Wandsworth Fire Station on the site of Roe's first workshop in the stables of his brother's house at 47 West Hill.

The underpass beneath the Wandsworth Bridge roundabout was the location for the scene in Stanley Kubrick's A Clockwork Orange in which a tramp is attacked.

There are several schools in Wandsworth including Shaftesbury Park Primary School.

== Transport ==
The nearest railway stations are Wandsworth Town; Wandsworth Common (one stop from Clapham Junction, and 12 minutes' train ride from London Victoria); and Earlsfield (one stop from Clapham Junction, and 12 minutes' train ride from London Waterloo). Wandsworth Town is also served by Southfields tube station in the Southfields area of the Town.

== Places of worship ==
All Saints' is the original parish church of Wandsworth, dating back to the 13th century, although the present building is mostly of the 18th century. St Anne's and Holy Trinity churches were built in the 19th century to accommodate a growing population.

Wandsworth Quaker Meeting House, built in 1778, is the oldest surviving Quaker meeting house in Greater London.

== Governance ==
Wandsworth lies at the convergence of all three of the borough's constituencies for elections to the House of Commons of the United Kingdom. The majority is currently situated in Putney, a small part of the southern portion is in Tooting and a small part of the eastern portion is in Battersea.

Wandsworth is covered by the Wandsworth Common and Wandsworth Town wards for elections to Wandsworth London Borough Council.

== See also ==
- List of people from Wandsworth
- List of schools in Wandsworth
