= King George's Park =

Park in south London

Coordinates: 51°26′56″N 0°11′39″W

- Southfields Park
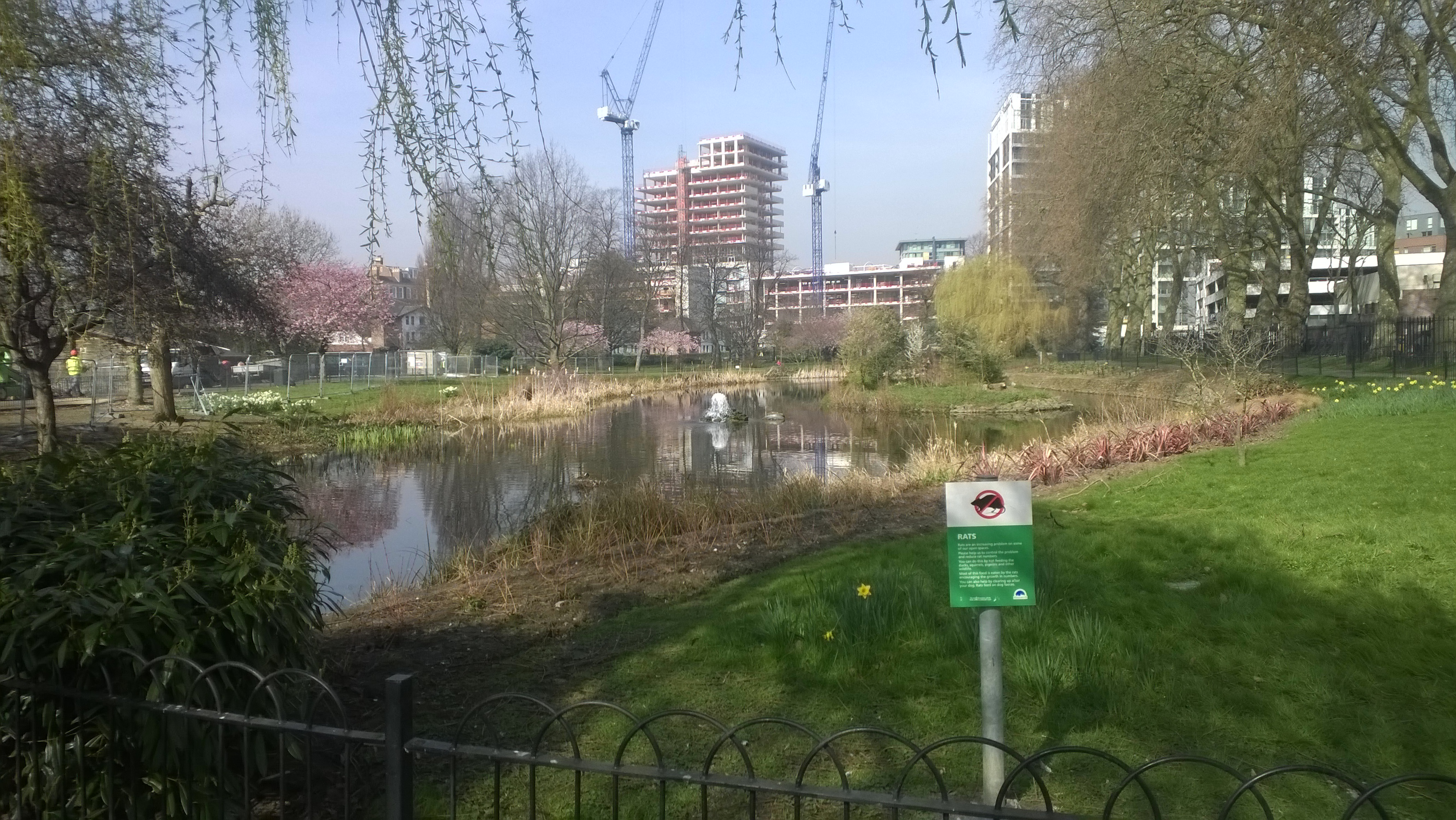
- The park pond in 2014
- Interactive map of King George's Park
- Nearest city: Wandsworth Town
- Operator: Wandsworth Council

King George's Park is a main park spanning Wandsworth and Southfields, South London.

== History ==
The park was originally called Southfields Park and was laid out in 1922. It was officially opened by King George V in 1923 and renamed in his honour.

The park previously contained a 165 feet (50 m) long open-air swimming pool and children's paddling area constructed in 1936 which eventually closed in 1993 and the site redeveloped with an indoor tennis and bowls centre.

In the aftermath of World War II nearly 100 prefabricated houses were constructed in the middle of the park, providing homes to roughly 400 people. The buildings remained for 18 years before their eventual removal, at which point the land was returned to the park.

In June 1952 officers of Special Branch arrested Soviet agent William Martin Marshall in King George's Park.

One of the park's footpaths – Foster's Way – is named in honour of Victoria Cross recipient Edward Foster.

== Details ==
The park is about 770 metres (2,530 ft) long, north–south, with an average width of 120 metres (390 ft). It covers approximately 55 acres (22 ha). The Wandle forms the eastern boundary. It has three areas of approximately equal size. In the north is a leisure area; in the centre is a play area; in the south are sports fields.

The leisure area includes formal gardens, a bowling green, tennis courts, a wild-fowl lake (at one time with row boats), and shaded paths with many seats. As this is less than five minutes' walk from the main shopping area of Wandsworth, it is, in summer, a great place for eating picnic lunches.

The play area has a pavilion where children's play sessions are held (the One O'Clock Club). Also there is an ecological site and an adventure playground. There are paths for walking and for cycling, and a wide open grass field for ball sports, formal and informal.

The Wandle trail passes through the park. Along its path, it is possible to walk nearly 1.5 kilometres (0.93 mi) in a natural area save for crossing one minor road. (Note: Kimber Road)

The park can be entered through gates at the north and south ends, and on the east via a footpath with its own bridge across the Wandle.
