= South Balham =

Electoral ward in the London Borough of Wandsworth

- Electoral ward for the Wandsworth London Borough Council
- Borough: London Borough of Wandsworth
- County: Greater London
- Population: 9,830 (2021)
- Major settlements: Balham
- Area: 1.200 km²

Current electoral ward
- Created: 2022
- Seats: 2

South Balham is an electoral ward in the London Borough of Wandsworth. The ward was first used in the 2022 elections and elects two councillors to Wandsworth London Borough Council.

== Geography ==
The ward is based on the suburb of Balham. It contains the Heaver Estate and Tooting Commons, which includes Tooting Bec Lido.

== Councillors ==
Election	Councillors	
2022	Clare Fraser (Labour)	Norman Marshall (Labour)
2026	Toby Hopkins (Labour)	Elizabeth Simos (Labour)

== Elections ==
=== 2026 ===
South Balham (2)
Party	Candidate	Votes	%	±%
Labour	Toby Hopkins	1,634	20	
Labour	Elizabeth Simos	1,617	20	
Conservative	Robert Hughes	1285	16	
Conservative	Luke Mathers	1249	16	
Green	Nina Kratky	741	9	
Green	Roy Vickery	647	8	
Liberal Democrats	John Pindar	256	3	
Liberal Democrats	Julian Ware	205	3	
Reform	Vanessa Holtham	188	2	
Reform	Charlie Robinson	176	2	
Turnout		7,998		
Labour hold		Swing		
Labour hold		Swing		

=== 2022 ===
South Balham (2)
Party	Candidate	Votes	%
Labour	Clare Fraser	1,850	52.3
Labour	Norman Marshall	1,518	42.9
Conservative	Tom Mytton	1,425	40.3
Conservative	Nabi Toktas	1,271	36.0
Green	Roy Vickery	451	12.8
Liberal Democrats	Arminel Fennelly	230	6.5
Liberal Democrats	David Lane	175	5.0
Turnout		3,535	46.4
Labour win (new seat)			
Labour win (new seat)			

== See also ==
- List of electoral wards in Greater London
