= St Mary's (Wandsworth ward) =

Electoral ward in London, England

- Electoral ward for the Wandsworth London Borough Council
- Borough: London Borough of Wandsworth
- County: Greater London
- Population: 14,183 (2021)
- Major settlements: Balham
- Area: 0.9019 km²

Current electoral ward
- Created: 2022
- Seats: 3
- Created from: St Mary's Park

St Mary's is an electoral ward in the London Borough of Wandsworth. The ward was first used in the 2022 elections and elects three councillors to Wandsworth London Borough Council.

== Geography ==
The ward is based on the area of St Mary's.

== Councillors ==
Election	Councillors		
2026	Charlie Fisher (Conservative)	Caroline de La Soujeole (Conservative)	Zara Wiles (Conservative)
2022	Jessica Lee (Labour)	Caroline de La Soujeole (Conservative)	Jamie Colclough (Labour)
2026	Charlie Fisher (Conservative)	Caroline de La Soujeole (Conservative)	Zarah Wiles (Conservative)

== Elections ==
=== 2026 ===
St Mary's (3)
Party	Candidate	Votes	%	±%
Conservative	Charlie Fisher	1,827	12	
Conservative	Caroline De La Soujeole	1,809	12	
Conservative	Zarah Wiles	1,681	11	
Labour	Simon Grayson	1666	11	
Labour	Sana Jafri	1663	11	
Labour	Josephine Mantey	1589	11	
Green	Lu Curtis	926	6	
Green	Ryan McMullen	852	6	
Green	Michael Stone	779	5	
Reform	Colleen Browne	448	3	
Reform	Robert Lake	422	3	
Reform	Oliver Venn	403	3	
Liberal Democrats	Dimitri Backwell	312	2	
Liberal Democrats	Catja De Haas	272	2	
Liberal Democrats	Tudor Nicholls	257	2	
Independent	Jeanine Canzius	57	0	
Turnout		14,963		
Conservative hold		Swing		
Conservative gain from Labour		Swing		
Conservative gain from Labour		Swing		

=== 2022 ===
St Mary's (3)
Party	Candidate	Votes	%
Labour	Jessica Lee	1,914	47.0
Labour	Jamie Colclough	1,880	46.2
Conservative	Caroline de la Soujeole	1,700	41.7
Conservative	Zachary Evans	1,693	41.6
Labour	Michael Stone	1,690	41.5
Conservative	Rhodri Morgan	1,659	40.7
Green	Byron Brown	465	11.4
Green	Lu Curtis	438	10.8
Liberal Democrats	Tudor Nicholls	348	8.5
Turnout		4,072	39.5
Labour win (new seat)			
Labour win (new seat)			
Conservative win (new seat)			

== See also ==
- List of electoral wards in Greater London
