= 2026 Wandsworth London Borough Council election =

2026 English local government election

- 7 May 2026

All 58 seats to Wandsworth London Borough Council 30 seats needed for a majority
	First party	Second party	Third party
Leader	Aled Richards-Jones	Simon Hogg
Party	Conservative	Labour	Independent
Last election	22 seats, 38.0%	35 seats, 46.3%	1 seat, 1.6%
Seats before	21	34	2
Seats won	29	28	1
Seat change	▲7	▼7	Steady
Popular vote	90,719	97,997	4,501
Percentage	31.1%	33.6%	1.5%
Swing	▼6.9pp	▼12.7pp	▼0.1pp
Leader before election
Simon Hogg
Labour
Leader after election
Aled Richards-Jones
Conservative
No overall control

The 2026 Wandsworth London Borough Council election took place on 7 May 2026. 58 members of Wandsworth London Borough Council were elected. The elections took place alongside local elections in the other London boroughs and elections to local authorities across the United Kingdom.

Prior to the election, the council was under Labour majority control. At the election, the council went under no overall control. The Conservatives overtook Labour to become the largest party by one seat, but fell one seat short of having an overall majority themselves. At the subsequent annual council meeting on 27 May 2026 the Conservative leader, Aled Richards-Jones, was appointed as leader of the council, leading a Conservative minority administration with the support of Malcolm Grimston, the lone independent councillor elected.

== Background ==
In 2022, Conservatives lost control of the council to Labour.

== Previous council composition ==
After 2022 election		Before 2026 election		After 2026 election	
Party	Seats	Party	Seats	Party	Seats
Labour	35	Labour	34	Labour	28
Conservative	22	Conservative	21	Conservative	29
Reform	0	Reform	1	Reform	0
Independent	1	Independent	2	Independent	1

Changes 2022–2026:

- May 2022: Andy Gibbons (Labour) dies – by-election held July 2022
- July 2022: Rex Osborn (Labour) wins by-election
- November 2023: Kate Forbes (Labour) resigns – by-election held January 2024
- January 2024: Sean Lawless (Labour) wins by-election
- March 2024: Claire Gilbert (Labour) resigns – by-election held May 2024
- May 2024: Nick Austin (Conservative) gains by-election from Labour
- July 2025: Nick Austin (Conservative) leaves party to sit as an independent
- August 2025: Mark Justin (Conservative) joins Reform

== Result summary ==
2026 Wandsworth London Borough Council election
Party	Seats	Gains	Losses	Net gain/loss	Seats %	Votes %	Votes	+/−
Conservative	29	7	0	▲7	50.0%	31.1%	90,719	▼6.9pp
Labour	28	0	7	▼7	48.3%	33.6%	97,997	▼12.7pp
Independent	1	0	0	Steady	1.7%	1.5%	4,501	▼0.1pp
Green	0	0	0	Steady	0.0%	17.3%	50,310	▲9.7pp
Liberal Democrats	0	0	0	Steady	0.0%	9.1%	26,472	▲2.7pp
Reform	0	0	0	Steady	0.0%	7.4%	21,443	New
TUSC	0	0	0	Steady	0.0%	0.05%	145	Steady
Total	58						291,587	

== Wards ==
Election results from the Wandsworth Council website.

=== Balham ===
Balham (3)
Party	Candidate	Votes	%	±%
Conservative	Lynsey Hedges	2,678	41.3	
Labour	Jo Rigby	2,543	39.2	
Conservative	Jonathan Iliff	2,458	37.9	
Conservative	Sami Abouzahra	2,422	37.4	
Labour	Tom Armstrong	2,364	36.5	
Labour	Tom Pollard	2,246	34.7	
Green	Nicholas Humberstone	1,027	15.8	
Green	John Low	959	14.8	
Green	Varun Santhosh	833	12.9	
Liberal Democrats	Warwick Danks	373	5.8	
Liberal Democrats	David Elliott	373	5.8	
Liberal Democrats	Toby Tanner	328	5.1	
Reform	Scott Grant	318	4.9	
Reform	Peter Wilkinson	273	4.2	
Reform	Nicholas Lester	250	3.9	
Turnout		19,445	52.54	+10.34
Conservative hold		Swing		
Conservative hold		Swing		
Labour hold		Swing		

=== Battersea Park ===
Battersea Park (3)
Party	Candidate	Votes	%	±%
Labour	Victoria Asante	1,766	36.3	
Labour	Anthony Belton	1,680	34.5	
Conservative	Claire Davies	1,673	34.4	
Conservative	Joanna Hall	1,601	32.3	
Labour	Daria Hass	1,528	31.4	
Conservative	Mozes Megyesi	1,423	29.2	
Green	Isabel Losada	986	20.3	
Green	Ben Koh	930	19.1	
Green	Matt Madden	794	16.3	
Reform	Antony Abell	508	10.4	
Reform	Lucy Jones	456	9.4	
Reform	Jonathan Aldwinckle	433	8.9	
Liberal Democrats	Alexandra Ames	288	5.9	
Liberal Democrats	Elizabeth Watson	279	5.7	
Liberal Democrats	Teresa Norman	255	5.2	
Turnout		14,600	40.35	+7.75
Labour hold		Swing		
Labour hold		Swing		
Conservative gain from Labour		Swing		

=== East Putney ===
East Putney (3)
Party	Candidate	Votes	%	±%
Labour	Jasmin Glynne	2,348	12	
Conservative	George Crivelli	2,299	12	
Conservative	Ravi Govindia	2,257	12	
Conservative	Deen Ossman	2237	12	
Labour	Dermot Neligan	2076	11	
Labour	Joe Smallman	1961	10	
Green	Maisie Jenkinson	1030	5	
Green	Hana Manthorpe	933	5	
Green	Shanaj Begum	927	5	
Reform	Jessica Anderson	565	3	
Liberal Democrats	Rebecca Barton-Singer	529	3	
Liberal Democrats	Nicki Breeze	514	3	
Liberal Democrats	Gabriel Barton-Singer	487	3	
Reform	Susan Muncey	453	2	
Reform	Ali Bath	427	2	
Turnout		19,043		
Labour hold		Swing		
Conservative hold		Swing		
Conservative hold		Swing		

=== Falconbrook ===
Falconbrook (2)
Party	Candidate	Votes	%	±%
Labour	Simon Hogg	1,257	47.2	
Labour	Kate Stock	1,133	42.6	
Green	Jonathan Antonacci	692	26.0	
Green	Timothy Read	536	20.1	
Conservative	Lizzie Hacking	425	16.0	
Conservative	Michael Mitchell	393	14.8	
Reform	Daniel Dalton	276	10.4	
Reform	Dawn James	264	9.9	
Liberal Democrats	Charles Leek	157	5.9	
Liberal Democrats	Brook Palloway	124	4.7	
Independent	Maher Nassour	64	2.4	
Turnout		5,321	37.61	+7.11
Labour hold		Swing		
Labour hold		Swing		

=== Furzedown ===
Furzedown (3)
Party	Candidate	Votes	%	±%
Labour	Leonie Cooper	3,005	17	
Labour	Judi Gasser	2,742	16	
Labour	Samantha Lewis	2,467	14	
Green	Eden Laudat	1628	9	
Green	Adam Kamenetzky	1525	9	
Green	Diane Wilkinson	1431	8	
Conservative	Oliver Clark	891	5	
Conservative	Siôn Davies	723	4	
Conservative	Andrew Wasielewski	706	4	
Reform	John Harmsen	397	2	
Reform	David Trowsdale	389	2	
Reform	James Williams	379	2	
Liberal Democrats	Tim Atkin	371	2	
Liberal Democrats	Phillipa Jeal	278	2	
Liberal Democrats	Romas Foord	242	1	
TUSC	Kat Taylor-Huzzard	61	0	
Turnout		17,237		
Labour hold		Swing		
Labour hold		Swing		
Labour hold		Swing		

=== Lavender ===
Lavender (2)
Party	Candidate	Votes	%	±%
Conservative	Dan Hamilton	1,747	44.8	
Conservative	Tom Pridham	1,720	44.1	
Labour	Edith Adejobi	1,137	29.2	
Labour	Joshua Groves	944	24.2	
Green	James Branigan	738	18.9	
Green	Luwis Gunarathne	553	14.2	
Liberal Democrats	Ed Chidley	302	7.7	
Liberal Democrats	Jenny Voyce	271	7.0	
Reform	Rupert Hunt	192	4.9	
Reform	Madison James	192	4.9	
Turnout		7,796	45.91	+7.91
Conservative hold		Swing		
Conservative hold		Swing		

=== Nine Elms ===
Nine Elms (2)
Party	Candidate	Votes	%	±%
Conservative	Matt Corner	702	44.4	
Conservative	Will Sweet	587	37.1	
Labour	Jane Briginshaw	392	24.8	
Green	Matthew Hitchins	335	21.2	
Green	Michael Di Stefano	325	20.6	
Labour	Douglas Oddy	274	17.3	
Reform	Mark Justin	150	9.5	
Reform	Mitch Durrant	144	9.1	
Liberal Democrats	James Fok	143	9.1	
Liberal Democrats	John Williams	110	7.0	
Turnout		3,162	35.71	+4.61
Conservative hold		Swing		
Conservative hold		Swing		

=== Northcote ===
Northcote (2)
Party	Candidate	Votes	%	±%
Conservative	Aled Richards-Jones	2,583	52.1	
Conservative	James Craig	2,551	51.4	
Labour	Clare Fraser	1,006	20.3	
Labour	Jonathan Heywood	853	17.2	
Liberal Democrats	Lara Fiorani	684	13.8	
Liberal Democrats	Francis Chubb	652	13.1	
Green	Joe Taylor	577	11.6	
Green	Areej Abuali	574	11.6	
Reform	Josh Stanton	235	4.7	
Reform	Alex Therrien	204	4.1	
Turnout		9,919	56.63	+8.23
Conservative hold		Swing		
Conservative hold		Swing		

=== Roehampton ===
Roehampton (3)
Party	Candidate	Votes	%	±%
Labour	Graeme Henderson	1,881	14	
Labour	Jenny Yates	1,838	14	
Labour	Matthew Tiller	1,768	13	
Conservative	Jane Cooper	1064	8	
Conservative	Anjusha Chaughule	1006	7	
Conservative	Helena Kanaan	924	7	
Green	Jay Northrop-Maltby	918	7	
Green	Tommy Tsherit	864	6	
Reform	Ben Francis	716	5	
Reform	Terry Washington	685	5	
Reform	Reema Siddiqui	619	5	
Liberal Democrats	Hugh Brown	411	5	
Liberal Democrats	Thomas Guyatt	364	3	
Liberal Democrats	Samuel McKenna	323	2	
Independent	Ivo Kuka	117	1	
Turnout		13,498		
Labour hold		Swing		
Labour hold		Swing		
Labour hold		Swing		

=== Shaftesbury and Queenstown ===
Shaftesbury & Queenstown (3)
Party	Candidate	Votes	%	±%
Labour	Sara Apps	1,927	52.7	
Labour	Aydin Dikerdem	1,708	46.7	
Labour	Stephen Worrall	1,417	38.7	
Green	Jo Bartholomeou	1,129	30.9	
Conservative	Imogen Bath	913	25.0	
Conservative	John Locker	845	23.1	
Conservative	Alex Mason	799	21.8	
Reform	Stephen Helms	446	12.2	
Reform	John Kincaid	404	11.0	
Reform	Natalie Wheen	395	10.8	
Liberal Democrats	Stephanie Seidman	363	9.9	
Liberal Democrats	Mark Bennett	357	9.8	
Liberal Democrats	David Kelleher	270	7.4	
Turnout		10,973	37.20	+5.8
Labour hold		Swing		
Labour hold		Swing		
Labour hold		Swing		

=== South Balham ===
South Balham (2)
Party	Candidate	Votes	%	±%
Labour	Toby Hopkins	1,634	20	
Labour	Elizabeth Simos	1,617	20	
Conservative	Robert Hughes	1285	16	
Conservative	Luke Mathers	1249	16	
Green	Nina Kratky	741	9	
Green	Roy Vickery	647	8	
Liberal Democrats	John Pindar	256	3	
Liberal Democrats	Julian Ware	205	3	
Reform	Vanessa Holtham	188	2	
Reform	Charlie Robinson	176	2	
Turnout		7,998		
Labour hold		Swing		
Labour hold		Swing		

=== Southfields ===
Southfields (2)
Party	Candidate	Votes	%	±%
Conservative	Guy Humphries	1,933	19	
Conservative	Emmeline Owens	1,763	17	
Liberal Democrats	Sue Wixley	1,435	14	
Liberal Democrats	Fergus Foord	1,372	13	
Labour	Megs Jacobs	1,096	11	
Labour	Peter Watts	932	9	
Green	Ruby Hawkes	628	6	
Green	Kester Leek	567	6	
Reform	Clive Sexton	237	2	
Reform	Iliyan Mladenov	211	2	
Turnout		10,173		
Conservative hold		Swing		
Conservative hold		Swing		

=== St Mary's ===
St Mary's (3)
Party	Candidate	Votes	%	±%
Conservative	Charlie Fisher	1,827	36.6	
Conservative	Caroline De La Soujeole	1,809	36.3	
Conservative	Zarah Wiles	1,681	33.7	
Labour	Simon Grayson	1,666	33.4	
Labour	Sana Jafri	1,663	33.3	
Labour	Josephine Mantey	1,589	31.9	
Green	Lu Curtis	926	18.6	
Green	Ryan McMullen	852	17.1	
Green	Michael Stone	779	15.6	
Reform	Colleen Browne	448	9.0	
Reform	Robert Lake	422	8.5	
Reform	Oliver Venn	403	8.1	
Liberal Democrats	Dimitri Backwell	312	6.3	
Liberal Democrats	Catja De Haas	272	5.5	
Liberal Democrats	Tudor Nicholls	257	5.2	
Independent	Jeanine Canzius	57	1.1	
Turnout		14,963	45.28	+5.78
Conservative hold		Swing		
Conservative gain from Labour		Swing		
Conservative gain from Labour		Swing		

=== Thamesfield ===
Thamesfield (3)
Party	Candidate	Votes	%	±%
Conservative	Ethan Brooks	2,349	12	
Conservative	Robert Morritt	2,185	11	
Conservative	Salvatore Murtas	2,083	11	
Liberal Democrats	Josh Hughes	2,033	10	
Liberal Democrats	James Jones	1,919	10	
Liberal Democrats	James Wilson	1,890	10	
Labour	Jessie Lee	1,260	6	
Labour	Anthony Ashurst	1,202	6	
Labour	Fredrick Emojevbe	1,099	6	
Green	Nicola Elliott	906	5	
Green	Kate Robinson	826	4	
Green	Fraser Pitt	697	4	
Reform	Adam Davison	354	2	
Reform	Tim Harrison	351	2	
Reform	Bruno Carreiro	345	2	
Turnout		19,499		
Conservative hold		Swing		
Conservative hold		Swing		
Conservative hold		Swing		

=== Tooting Bec ===
Tooting Bec (3)
Party	Candidate	Votes	%	±%
Labour	Sheila Boswell	2,495	15	
Labour	Annamarie Critchard	2,342	14	
Labour	Paul White	2,015	12	
Green	Yannina Captain	1773	11	
Green	Lisa Laudat	1549	9	
Green	Shair Khan	1548	9	
Conservative	Kyle Evans	979	6	
Conservative	Sam Merullo	869	5	
Conservative	Tolga Inanc	810	5	
Liberal Democrats	Arminel Fennelly	405	2	
Reform	Mark Derbyshire	399	2	
Reform	Giles Rowe	378	2	
Reform	Stephen Skipper	341	2	
Liberal Democrats	Imran Hussain	282	2	
Liberal Democrats	Pek-San Tan	255	2	
TUSC	Sofia Da Silveira	36	0	
Turnout		16,476		
Labour hold		Swing		
Labour hold		Swing		
Labour hold		Swing		

=== Tooting Broadway ===
Tooting Broadway (3)
Party	Candidate	Votes	%	±%
Labour	Kemi Akinola	2,385	16	
Labour	Sean Lawless	2,121	13	
Labour	Rex Osborn	1,956	13	
Green	Michael Bankole	1905	12	
Green	Rachael Delahunty	1860	12	
Green	Cameron Joshi	1608	10	
Conservative	Gareth Wallace	613	4	
Conservative	Dominic Lowe	607	4	
Conservative	William Mumby	557	4	
Reform	Stewart Foster	332	2	
Reform	Stef Dearden	329	2	
Reform	Claire Kennedy	327	2	
Liberal Democrats	Phillip Cartwright	315	2	
Liberal Democrats	Belinda Keheyan	217	1	
Liberal Democrats	Haren Thillainathan	185	1	
TUSC	Kim Hendry	37	0	
Turnout		15,354		
Labour hold		Swing		
Labour hold		Swing		
Labour hold		Swing		

=== Trinity ===
Trinity (2)
Party	Candidate	Votes	%	±%
Labour	Lizzy Dobres	1,842	21	
Conservative	Kirsten Botting	1,647	19	
Labour	Jack Mayorcas	1583	18	
Conservative	Otto Jacobsson	1518	17	
Green	Georgia Rayner	759	9	
Green	Jed Simister	508	6	
Liberal Democrats	Dylan Henderson	250	3	
Liberal Democrats	Caroline Ogden	221	3	
Reform	Veronica De Homersley	199	2	
Reform	Mark Elliott	198	2	
Independent	Mary Ingham	56	1	
TUSC	Adam Powell-Davies	11	0	
Turnout		8,792		
Labour hold		Swing		
Conservative gain from Labour		Swing		

=== Wandle ===
Wandle (2)
Party	Candidate	Votes	%	±%
Labour	Denise Paul	1,453	19	
Conservative	Chris Baron	1,432	19	
Labour	Sarmila Varatharaj	1310	17	
Conservative	Will Olmi	1307	17	
Green	Glyn Goodwin	696	9	
Green	Sylvain Magne	541	7	
Reform	John Caldecott	232	3	
Liberal Democrats	Pierre Ezard	203	3	
Liberal Democrats	Susan Shocket	189	2	
Reform	Wil Lindalo	183	2	
Wandle Independent Group	Andrew Macmillan	126	2	
Turnout		7,672		
Labour hold		Swing		
Conservative gain from Labour		Swing		

=== Wandsworth Common ===
Wandsworth Common (3)
Party	Candidate	Votes	%	±%
Conservative	Angela Graham	2,655	15	
Conservative	Peter Graham	2,426	14	
Conservative	Tom Mytton	2,313	13	
Labour	Melanie McLaren	1644	9	
Labour	James Foster	1609	9	
Labour	Ellie Pyemont	1581	9	
Green	Eliza Broadbent	1141	7	
Green	Suzanne Ellis	937	5	
Green	Maximilian Ellis	833	5	
Liberal Democrats	Eileen Arms	477	3	
Reform	Amanda Clarke	469	3	
Reform	Paul Dyke	425	2	
Reform	Colin Stickney	350	2	
Liberal Democrats	Gareth Morgan-Jones	300	2	
Liberal Democrats	David Lane	296	2	
Turnout		17,456		
Conservative hold		Swing		
Conservative hold		Swing		
Conservative hold		Swing		

=== Wandsworth Town ===
Wandsworth Town (3)
Party	Candidate	Votes	%	±%
Labour	Michelle Cook	2,455	13	
Labour	Sarah Davies	2,374	13	
Conservative	Noel Dube	2,194	12	
Conservative	Caroline Elsom	2178	12	
Labour	Shirin Georgiani	2095	11	
Conservative	John Pain	2058	11	
Green	James Couper	1013	5	
Green	Sacha Ismail	917	5	
Green	Jane Thomson	862	5	
Liberal Democrats	Susanna Dammann	522	3	
Reform	Eugenia Georgieva	405	2	
Reform	Stephen Lord	423	2	
Reform	David Lawrence	412	2	
Liberal Democrats	Josh Sherer	341	2	
Liberal Democrats	Dion Tanteles	264	1	
Turnout		18,513		
Labour hold		Swing		
Labour hold		Swing		
Conservative hold		Swing		

=== West Hill ===
West Hill (3)
Party	Candidate	Votes	%	±%
Independent	Malcolm Grimston	4,081	26	
Labour	Angela Ireland	1,679	11	
Conservative	Daniel Ghossain	1,314	8	
Labour	Sam Manley	1265	8	
Conservative	Charlie Drakesmith	1238	8	
Green	Sian Wright	1140	7	
Green	Jason Whiffin	1033	7	
Labour	Harry Roth	898	6	
Conservative	Madeline Woolf	835	5	
Liberal Democrats	Eleanor Doody	484	3	
Reform	Emily Evans	434	3	
Reform	AJ Durrant	389	2	
Reform	Daniel Blaszczyk	386	2	
Liberal Democrats	Patrick Gilbert	292		
Liberal Democrats	Duncan Lyons	266	2	
Turnout		15,734		
Independent hold		Swing		
Labour hold		Swing		
Conservative hold		Swing		

=== West Putney ===
West Putney (3)
Party	Candidate	Votes	%	±%
Conservative	Nick Austin	2,745	15	
Conservative	Melanie Hampton	2,397	13	
Conservative	Shakeel Ahmad	2,351	13	
Labour	Ed Tomlinson	1699	10	
Labour	Noureen Khan	1671	9	
Labour	Umer Ghuman	1506	8	
Green	Sarah Thomas	971	5	
Green	Christopher Poole	903	5	
Liberal Democrats	Joanna Chidgey	812	5	
Reform	Robin Haddon	629	4	
Reform	Gloria Martin	571	3	
Liberal Democrats	Timothy Thomas	555	3	
Liberal Democrats	Mark Lejman	542	3	
Reform	Saida Daudova	490	3	
Turnout		17,842		
Conservative gain from Labour		Swing		
Conservative gain from Labour		Swing		
Conservative hold		Swing		

== By-elections ==
=== Trinity ===
Trinity by-election, 27th August 2026
Party	Candidate	Votes	%	±%
Labour Co-op	Shirin Georgiani	1,558	47.5	+8.8
Conservative	Otto Jacobsson	1,431	43.6	+9.0
Green	Sylvain Magne	168	5.1	−10.8
Liberal Democrats	Dylan Henderson	75	2.3	−3.0
Reform	Josh Stanton	51	1.6	−2.6
Majority		127	3.9	N/A
Turnout		3,283	39.6	N/A
Labour Co-op hold		Swing		

The by-election was triggered by the resignation of Labour councillor Lizzy Dobres, who cited taking up a job that is "politically restricted" as the reason for her resignation. The by-election is particularly important, as a Conservative victory would tip the council into Conservative majority control.
