= London Plus =

London Plus may refer to:

- BBC London Plus, a British regional TV programme 1984–1989
- London Plus Credit Union, a British not-for-profit member-owned financial co-operative
