= Hyde Farm Estate =

Residential area in Balham, London

Coordinates: 51.444°N 0.139°W

The Hyde Farm Estate is a residential area situated in Balham, a district of south London, in the United Kingdom. Unlike the rest of Balham, it is wholly within the London Borough of Lambeth. Its boundaries are: to the north: Hydethorpe Road; to the east: Radbourne Road; to the south: Emmanuel Road; and to the west: Cavendish Road.

Historically, the estate was one large medieval field of some sixty acres located at the southern edge of the parish of Clapham. The area was known as the Hyde during the Middle Ages, and later as Hydefield. In 1587 the field was purchased by Richard Martyn who then sold it to Emmanuel College, Cambridge, which had been founded three years earlier. The names of Emmanuel Road and Scholars Road commemorate this history. The Hyde farm was reputedly particularly well known for its pigs.

The Hyde Farm Estate was developed between 1896 and 1916. Prior to development starting, the historic field boundary with Tooting Common was realigned. The narrow strip of the common to the east of Cavendish Road was enclosed and the line of Emmanuel Road (formerly Bleak Hall Lane) was moved north to provide a compensating wider portion of common land to the north of the railway line between Streatham Hill and Balham (now known as Emmanuel Field). The sole developer of the eastern portion of the estate was Edward Hyde Dashwood (1867–1950), a builder then based in Wimbledon. Dashwood took long leases of the land in stages from Emmanuel College either in his own name or in that of a private company which he wholly controlled, the Hyde Estate Building Company Balham. As was then customary, Dashwood financed the development through mortgages, which he carefully paid back over a long period. Among his early mortgagees was his uncle Peyton Dashwood (1836–1908), a successful land agent and surveyor. His portion of the Hyde Farm estate was built to a consistent design in red brick with characteristic bow windows. The low-rise houses were mostly divided into two as so-called cottage flats, which were popular in the Edwardian period.

Dashwood's development was successful, allowing him to rise in the social scale and move to West End addresses. He also bought a farm at Aston Rowant, Oxfordshire, where he spent increasing time. Towards the end of his life, in 1946, he established the E Hayes Dashwood Foundation to provide low-cost housing for infirm or disabled ex-servicemen and their widows. The foundation now owns approximately one hundred and fifty of the properties in the area, most of the remainder having been sold to leaseholders or to other housing associations.

== Hyde Farm Conservation Area ==
On 13 February 1996 the London Borough of Lambeth designated a portion of the estate (between Haverhill Road and Radbourne Road) as a Conservation Area under the Civic Amenities Act 1967. Because of the uniform appearance of the houses and the survival of so many original doors and windows, since 2002 the area of the Conservation Area has also been subject to an Article Four Direction restricting changes without specific consent from Lambeth as the planning authority.

== 2014 Council election: Thornton Ward ==
=== Thornton ===
Thornton (3)
Party	Candidate	Votes	%	±%
Labour	Lib Peck *	2,280	20	+1
Labour	Diana Morris *	2,220	20	+3
Labour	Edward Davie *	2,113	19	−1
UKIP	Bruce Machan	963	8	+8
Conservative	Simon Helmsley	664	6	+0
Conservative	Vernon de Maynard	570	5	+0
Conservative	Savill Young	481	4	−1
Green	Adrian Audsley	360	3	+3
Green	Hannah Kershaw	336	3	+3
Green	Charles Lankaster	272	3	+2
Liberal Democrats	Rebecca MacNair	271	3	−10
Liberal Democrats	Duncan Brack	258	2	−7
Liberal Democrats	John Pindar	227	2	−11
Total votes		10,816		
Labour hold		Swing		
Labour hold		Swing		
Labour hold		Swing		
