= Oak Lodge School =

Location
- 101 Nightingale Lane; Balham, London, SW12 8NA; England; 51°26′55″N 0°09′30″W

Information
- Type: Community special school
- Established: 28 August 1905
- Local authority: Wandsworth
- Department for Education URN: 101094 Tables
- Ofsted: Reports
- Headteacher: Caroline Rowlandson
- Gender: Coeducational
- Age: 10 to 19
- Enrolment: 85
- Houses: Forest, Sky and Sun
- Website: www.oaklodge.wandsworth.sch.uk

Oak Lodge School is a specialist day school with a residential provision for students with hearing, speech, language and communication needs aged 10–19. It is located in the London borough of Wandsworth in England.

Oak Lodge School also hosts other services, such as Life Long Learning (for education of deaf adults) and a Sixth Form (providing support to deaf students who are educated at nearby colleges and on-site).

The school currently has more than 80 pupils from 25 different boroughs and was graded good in February 2019. A residential provision is also available for a small number of children to stay in the school's hostel during the week. Phoenix House was judged to be outstanding by Ofsted in March 2020.

== Ofsted Inspection ==
Ofsted, the UK Government's Office for Standards in Education, most recently inspected the school in 2025. They praised the school as "welcoming and inclusive" and said that "pupils are valued as individuals" and "work hard and behave well". However, they also criticised the consistency of the implementation of the new curriculum, stating that "in a few subjects, the school has not clearly defined what subject knowledge should be taught and when".
