= Trinity (Wandsworth ward) =

Electoral ward in the London Borough of Wandsworth

- Electoral ward for the Wandsworth London Borough Council
- Trinity ward boundaries since 2022
- Borough: Wandsworth
- County: Greater London
- Population: 11,181 (2021) (Note: 2021 Census data reported for 2022 ward boundaries)
- Electorate: 8,198 (2022)
- Major settlements: Tooting
- Area: 1.350 square kilometres (0.521 sq mi)

Current electoral ward
- Created: 2022
- Number of members: 2
- Councillors: Kirsten Botting; Shirin Georgiani
- Created from: Nightingale, Tooting, Wandsworth Common
- GSS code: E05014025

Trinity is an electoral ward in the London Borough of Wandsworth. The ward was first used in the 2022 elections. It returns two councillors to Wandsworth London Borough Council.

== List of councillors ==
Seat	Councillor	Took office	Left office	Party	Election
1	Lizzy Dobres	2022	2026	Labour	2022, 2026
2	Jack Mayorcas	2022	2026	Labour	2022
1	Kirsten Botting	2026	Incumbent	Conservative	2026
2	Shirin Georgiani	2026	Incumbent	Labour	2026

== Wandsworth council elections ==
Trinity ward was created as part of a revision of electoral boundaries in Wandsworth in 2022.

=== 2026 by-election ===
The by-election took place on 27 August 2026, following the resignation of Lizzy Dobres.

2026 Trinity by-election
Party	Candidate	Votes	%	±%
Labour	Shirin Georgiani	1,558		
Conservative	Otto Jacobsson	1,431		
Green	Sylvain Magne	168		
Liberal Democrats	Dylan Henderson	75		
Reform	Josh Stanton	51		
Turnout			39.56	
Labour hold		Swing		

=== 2026 election ===
The election took place on 7 May 2026.

2026 Wandsworth London Borough Council election: Trinity (2)
Party	Candidate	Votes	%	±%
Labour	Lizzy Dobres	1,842	21	
Conservative	Kirsten Botting	1,647	19	
Labour	Jack Mayorcas	1583	18	
Conservative	Otto Jacobsson	1518	17	
Green	Georgia Rayner	759	9	
Green	Jed Simister	508	6	
Liberal Democrats	Dylan Henderson	250	3	
Liberal Democrats	Caroline Ogden	221	3	
Reform	Veronica De Homersley	199	2	
Reform	Mark Elliott	198	2	
Independent	Mary Ingham	56	1	
TUSC	Adam Powell-Davies	11	0	
Turnout		8,792		
Labour hold		Swing		
Conservative gain from Labour		Swing		

=== 2022 election ===
The election took place on 5 May 2022.

2022 Wandsworth London Borough Council election: Trinity (2)
Party	Candidate	Votes	%
Labour	Lizzy Dobres	2,074	48.5
Labour	Jack Mayorcas	1,827	42.7
Conservative	Kirsten Botting	1,680	39.3
Conservative	Crawford Anderson	1,672	39.1
Green	Ann Pasola	407	9.5
Liberal Democrats	Jon Irwin	387	9.1
Liberal Democrats	Paul Tibbles	369	8.6
Turnout		4,276	52.3
Labour win (new seat)			
Labour win (new seat)			
