= Balham =

Area in south London, England

Coordinates: 51.4434°N 0.1525°W

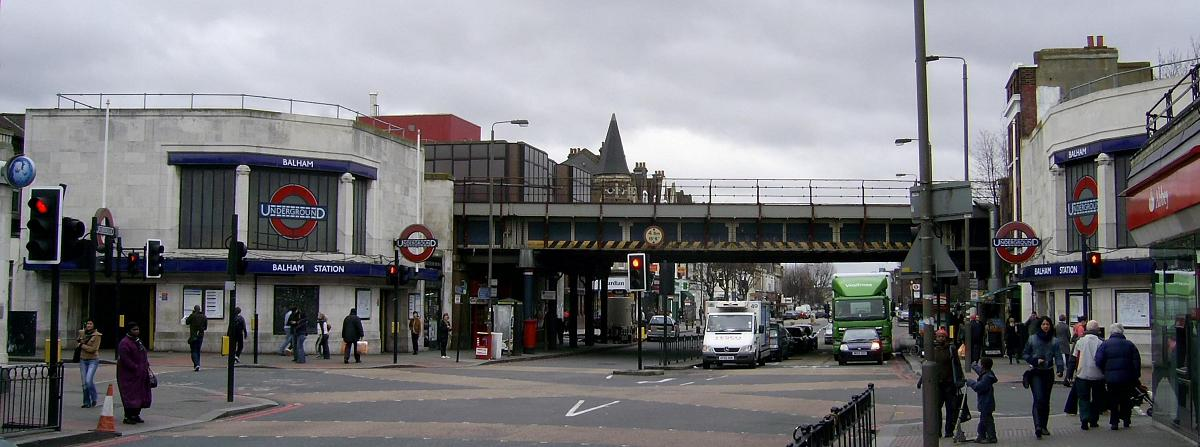
- Balham High Road

- Location within Greater London
- Population: 14,751 (2011 Census.Ward)
- OS grid reference: TQ285735
  - Charing Cross: 4.5 mi (7.2 km) NNE
- London borough: Wandsworth; Lambeth
- Ceremonial county: Greater London
- Region: London
- Country: England
- Sovereign state: United Kingdom
- Post town: LONDON
- Postcode district: SW12, SW4, SW17
- Dialling code: 020
- Police: Metropolitan
- Fire: London
- Ambulance: London
- UK Parliament: Tooting and Battersea; Clapham and Brixton Hill
- London Assembly: Merton and Wandsworth; Lambeth and Southwark

Balham (/ˈbæləm/) is an area in south-west London, England, in the London Borough of Wandsworth, with small parts extending into the neighbouring London Borough of Lambeth. It has been settled since Saxon times and appears in the Domesday Book as Belgeham.

The area saw significant development following the opening of Balham railway station in 1856. During World War II, Balham Underground station suffered heavy damage from air raids, killing around 64 people. In 1974, a bomb planted by the Provisional IRA exploded near government buildings in the area.

Balham is between four south London commons. The town centre features a variety of bars, restaurants, and shops, and the area is economically and culturally diverse. The Polish, Irish, Portuguese, Somali, Pakistani, and Brazilian communities are well-represented in Balham.

Notable landmarks in the area include the Bedford, a pub venue for live music and comedy, the distinctive Art Deco-designed Du Cane Court, and the Oak Lodge School for deaf children. Balham has its own library and leisure centre and was the site of the UK's first pedestrian diagonal X-crossing. Balham station serves as an interchange between National Rail and London Underground services.

== History ==
A map showing the Balham ward of Wandsworth Metropolitan Borough as it appeared in 1916

The settlement appears in the Domesday Book as Belgeham. Bal refers to 'rounded enclosure' and ham to a homestead, village or river enclosure. It was held by Geoffrey Orlateile. Its Domesday Assets were: 1 1/2 ploughs, eight acres (three hectares) of meadow. It rendered (in total): £2. The Balham area has been settled since Saxon times. Balham Hill and Balham High Road follow the line of the Roman road Stane Street to Chichester – (now the A24 road). Balham is recorded in several maps in the 1600s as Ballam or Balham Hill or Balham Manor. The village was within the parish of Streatham. Large country retreats for the affluent classes were built there in the 18th century; however, most development occurred after the opening of Balham railway station on the line to Crystal Palace in 1856.

=== Second World War air raid ===
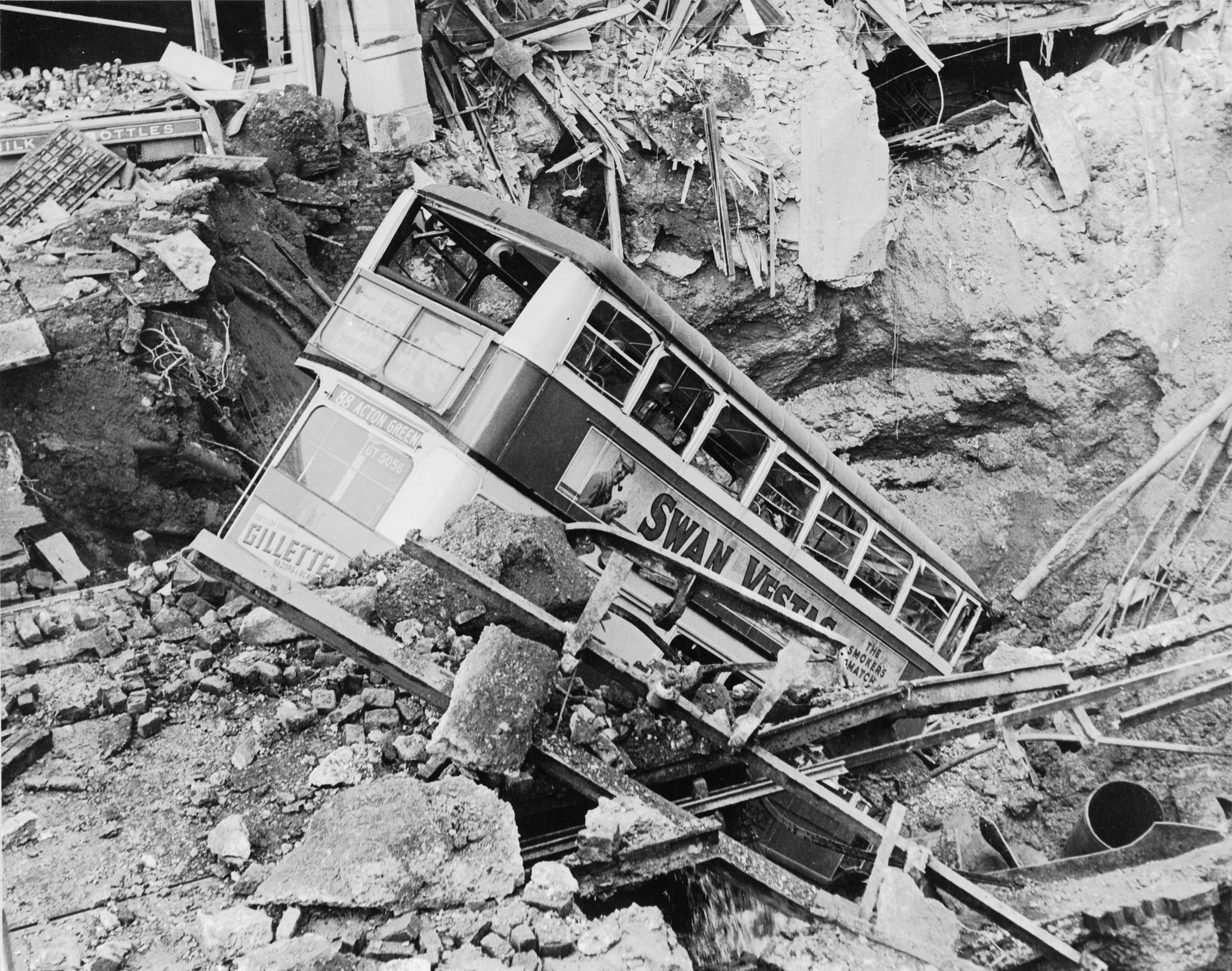
Air raid damage in Balham

On 14 October 1940 Balham Underground station was badly damaged by air raids on London during World War II. People took shelter in the tube station during the raids. A bomb fell in the High Road and through the roof of the Underground station below, bursting water and gas mains and killing around 64 people. This particular incident was featured in Atonement, a 2001 novel by Ian McEwan. An image of the aftermath is of the bus, on route 88, which had fallen into the bomb crater. All passengers, along with the driver and conductor, had escaped from the bus before it fell. The bus was hauled out of the crater after two weeks.

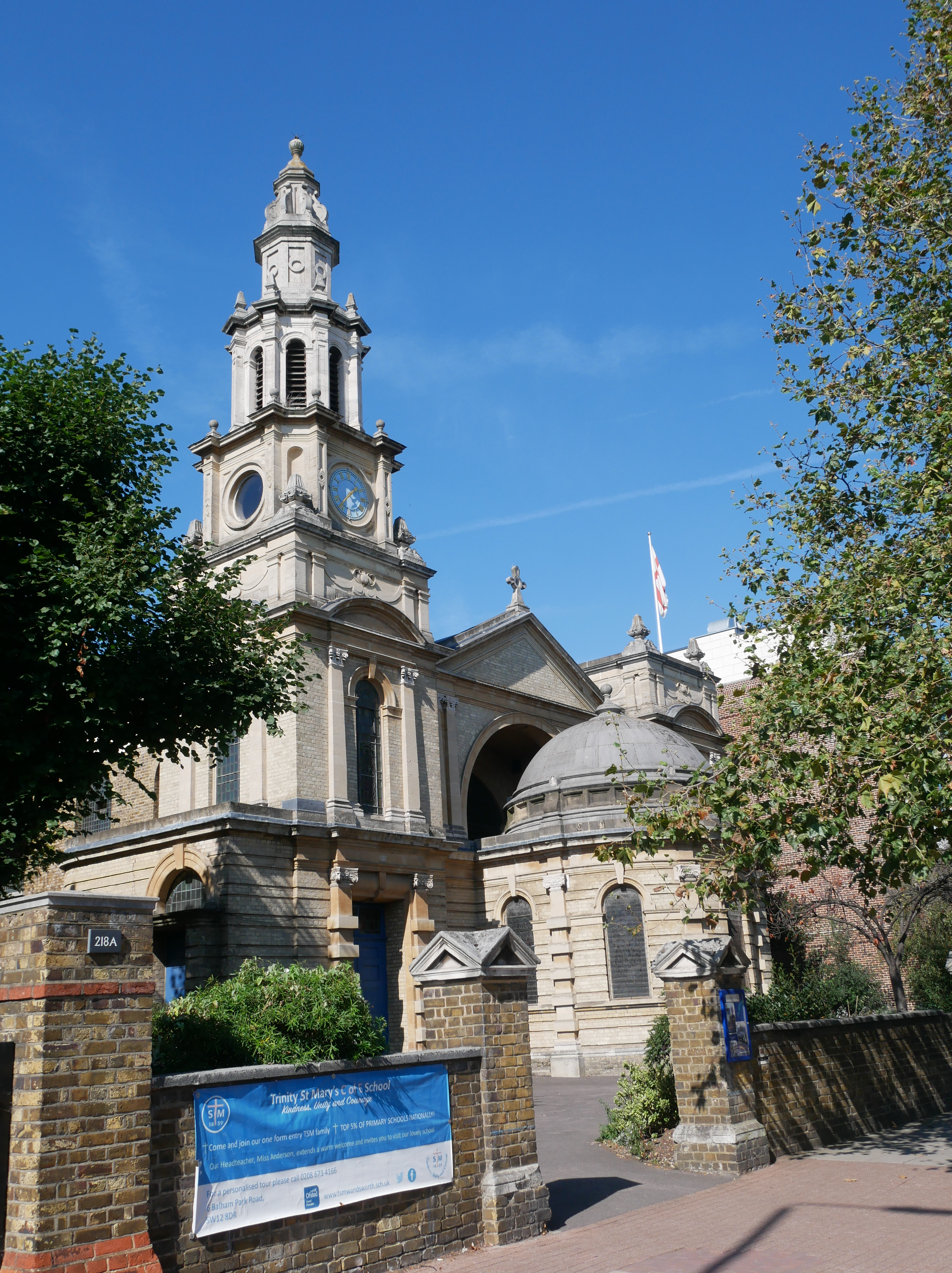
St Mary and St John the Divine church

=== Post-war ===
On the morning of 17 July 1974 a 10-pound bomb planted by the Provisional IRA in a dustbin near Irene House (a Social Security office) and St Mary & St John the Divine Anglican Church exploded, shattering a four-foot wall and 50 windows. No-one was hurt.

== Geography ==
Balham is overwhelmingly in Wandsworth, with only small parts in the neighbouring Borough of Lambeth and encompasses the A24 north of Tooting Bec and the roads radiating off it. The Balham SW12 postcode includes the southern part of Clapham Park otherwise known as Clapham South and the Hyde Farm area, both east of Cavendish Road and within Lambeth (historically Clapham, except for Weir Road) as well as a small detached part of Clapham south of Nightingale Lane, and part of Battersea (the roads north of Nightingale Lane). The southern part of Balham, towards Tooting Bec, near the 1930s block of Art Deco flats called Du Cane Court and the area to the south of Wandsworth Common, comes under the SW17 postcode. The Heaver Estate lies to the south of Balham in Tooting. The Estate mainly comprises substantial houses, was built in the grounds of the old Bedford Hill House and was the work of local Victorian builder, Alfred Heaver.

Balham is situated between four south London commons: Clapham Common to the north, Wandsworth Common to the west, Tooting Graveney Common to the south, and the adjoining Tooting Bec Common to the east – the latter two historically distinct areas are referred to by both Wandsworth Council and some local people as Tooting Common.

Neighbouring areas are: Battersea, Brixton, Clapham Park, Clapham South, Streatham, Tooting and Tooting Bec.

== Economy ==
Balham's town centre has a variety of bars, restaurants and shops including major chains. There are also local services, including independent stores, coffee houses and brasseries. There are two car parks serving the vicinity, one behind the Sainsbury's (181 spaces) and one in front of Waitrose.

== Demography ==
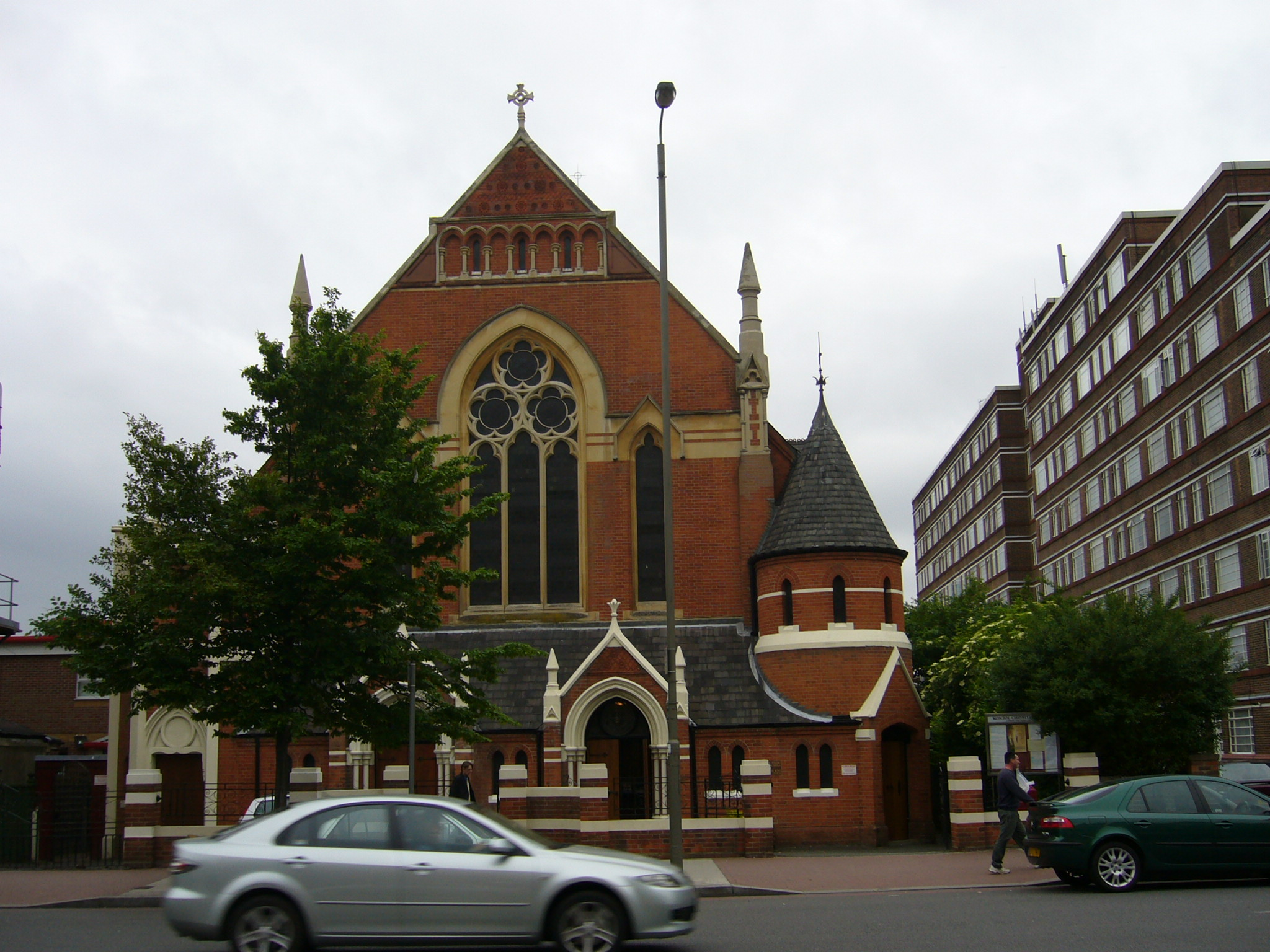
The Polish Roman Catholic Church of Christ the King

Balham is diverse both in terms of economic and cultural demographics with an increasingly professional middle class population.

The Polish population in Balham has hugely increased since 2006, though Balham has been one of the centres of the community in London since World War II. The White Eagle Club is a thriving Polish community centre, and its traditional Saturday night dance draws people from across London. Opposite the White Eagle is The Polish Roman Catholic Church of Christ the King.

The Irish, Portuguese, Somali, Pakistani and Brazilian communities are also well represented.

== Governance ==
Balham is part of the Tooting constituency for elections to the House of Commons of the United Kingdom.

Balham is covered by the Balham and South Balham wards for elections to Wandsworth London Borough Council.

== Landmarks ==
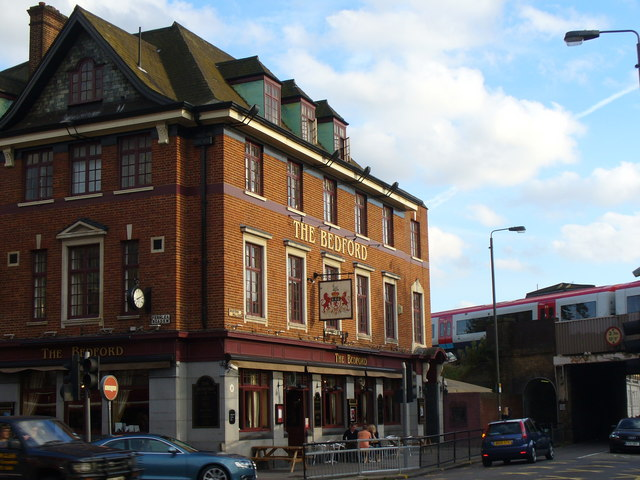
The Bedford

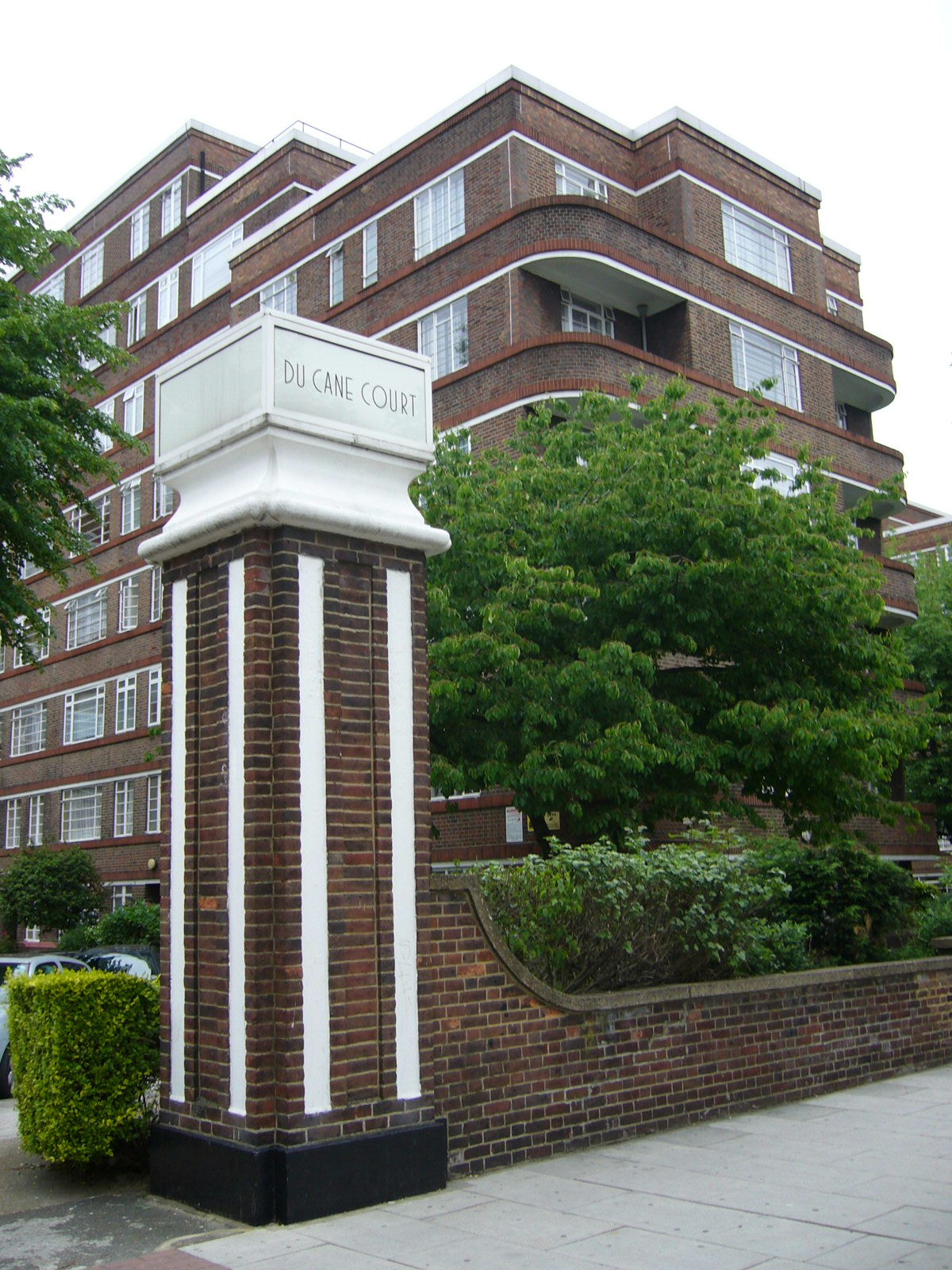
Du Cane Court is a distinctive local landmark with its Art Deco design.

Impressions of Balham - one of four bronze reliefs on Balham Station Road

- The Bedford is a pub venue for live music and comedy on Bedford Hill. Performers at the Banana Cabaret have included Stephen K Amos, Omid Djalili, Harry Hill, Eddie Izzard, Al Murray and Catherine Tate. Musicians who have played include Ed Sheeran and Sam Smith. The pub has won various awards including the Publican Music Pub of the Year 2002; the Morning Advertiser Pub of the Year 2004; and the Evening Standard Pub of the Year 2002. In 1876, the pub building (then named the Bedford Hotel) housed the coroner's inquest into the notorious unsolved murder of Charles Bravo, a resident and lawyer who was poisoned, possibly by his wife. The Priory, where the alleged murder took place, is also a landmark noted for the specific architectural style.
- The Bedford Hill area of Balham was associated with street prostitution throughout the 1970s and '80s. A project was organised for the matter in the late 2000s and since then has no longer been an issue for residents.
- Du Cane Court was the largest block of flats in Europe built for private occupation rather than as social housing at the time. Its 676 flats range from studios up to 4-bedroom penthouses. The block has had a number of notable residents, including comedian Tommy Trinder and actress Dame Margaret Rutherford. Scenes from Agatha Christie's Poirot were filmed in the building.
- Oak Lodge School is a secondary school for deaf children aged 11 to 19. It accepts pupils from all over London.
- Impressions of Balham are four cold cast bronze reliefs mounted on a high brick wall on Balham Station Road. These depict local residents and everyday scenes. They were conceived and constructed by Christine Thomas and Julia Barton and installed in 1991.
- Balham has its own library and leisure centre.
- The UK's first pedestrian diagonal X-crossing was installed at the intersection of Balham High Road, with Balham Station Road and Chestnut Grove in 2005. This was later adopted at Oxford Circus in 2009 which was the second X-crossing in the UK.
- The world's first "intelligent" pedestrian crossings have also been trialled at Balham station (including Tooting Bec).
- The prominent neon sign "Roberts for Ekcovision" installed by a former electrical shop in the 1950s on Bedford Hill was restored in 2022. (Note: The Roberts store rented out the "Ekcovision" brand of television sets manufactured by the British electronics company E. K. Cole Ltd (aka EKCO). The advertisement was proposed for the shop by EKCO and is positioned to be viewed by passengers on mainline trains passing through Balham station.)
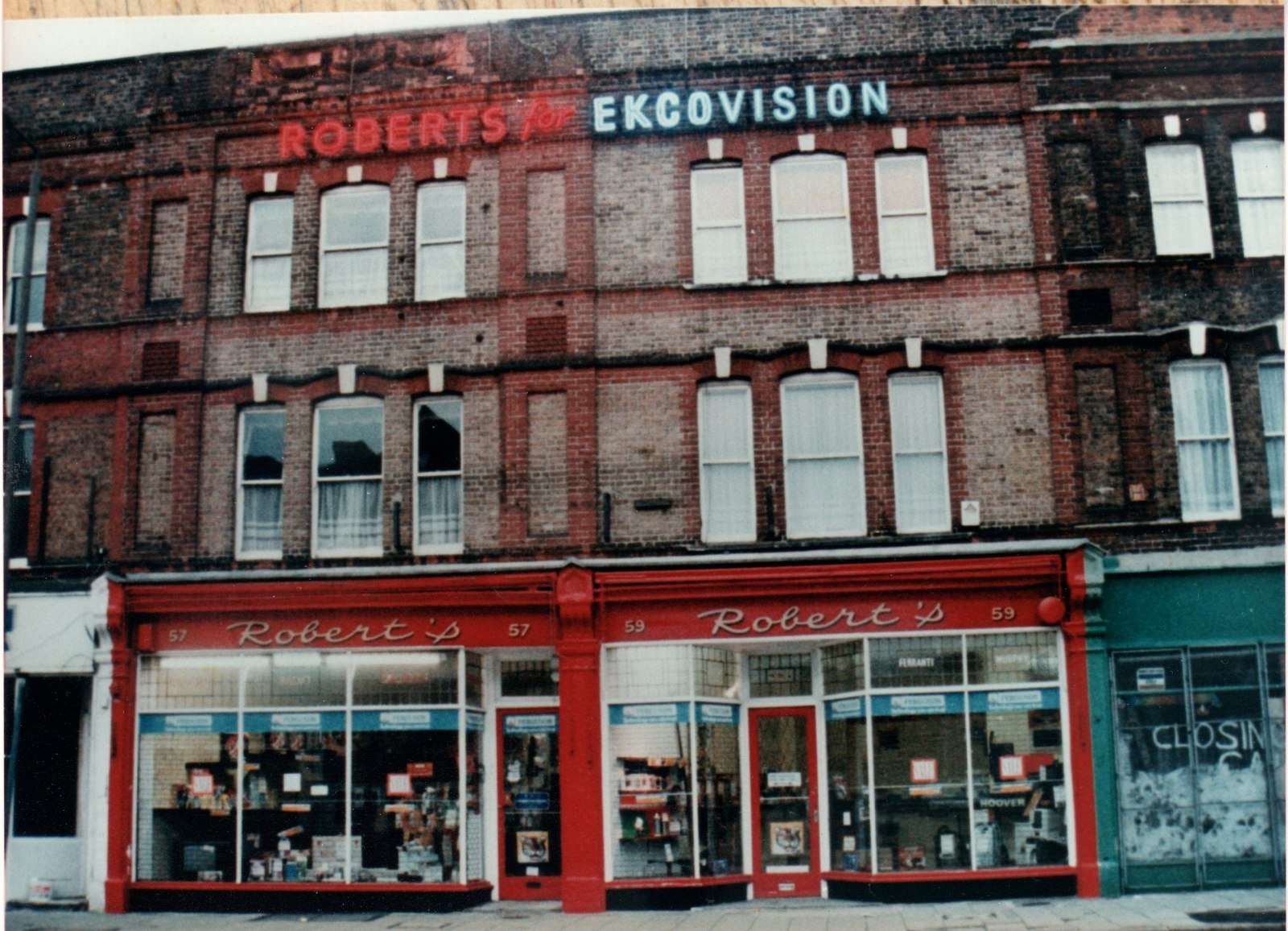
Original "Roberts for Ekcovision" neon sign on Bedford Hill (c. 1985)

== Transport ==
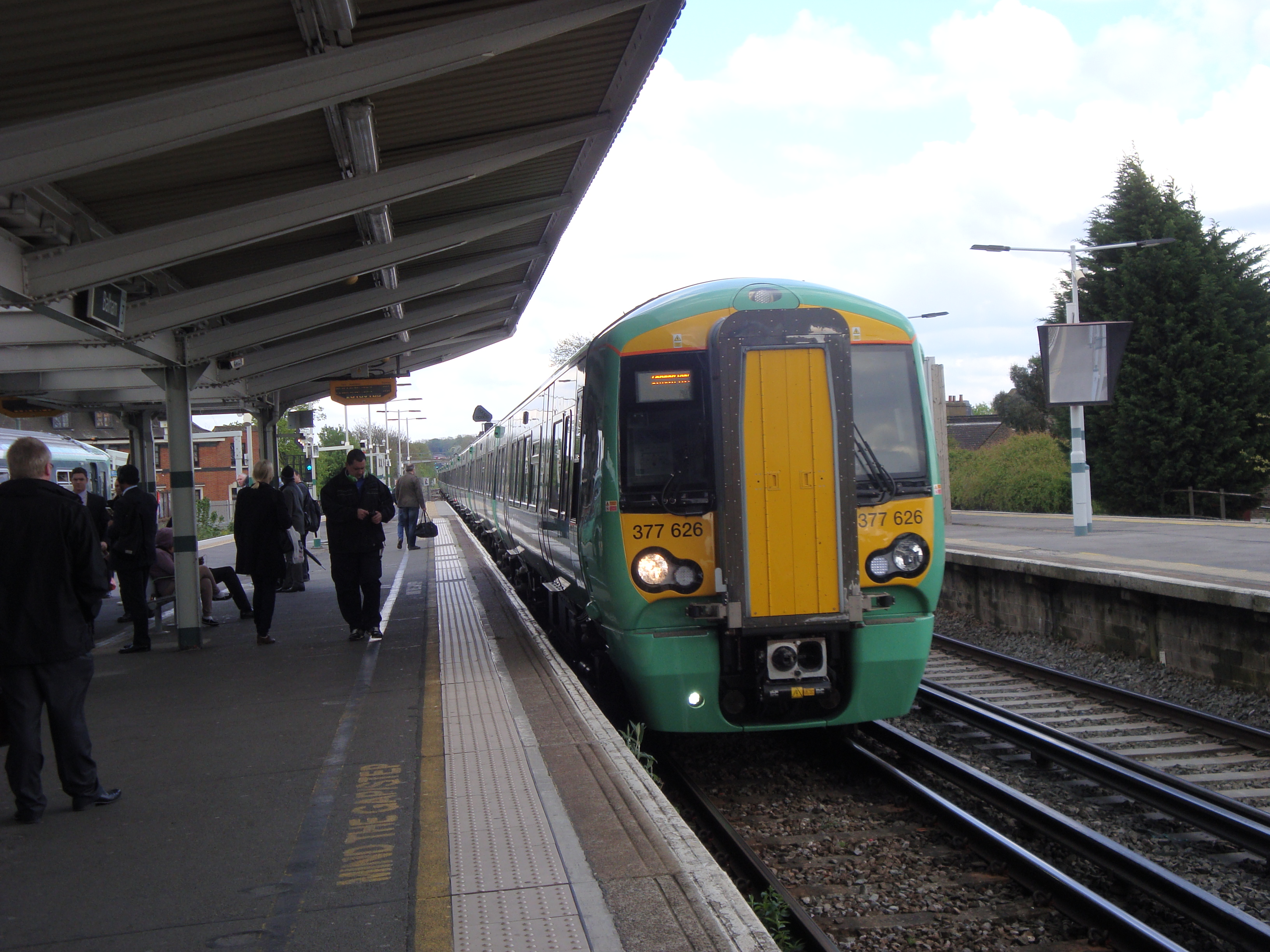
National Rail

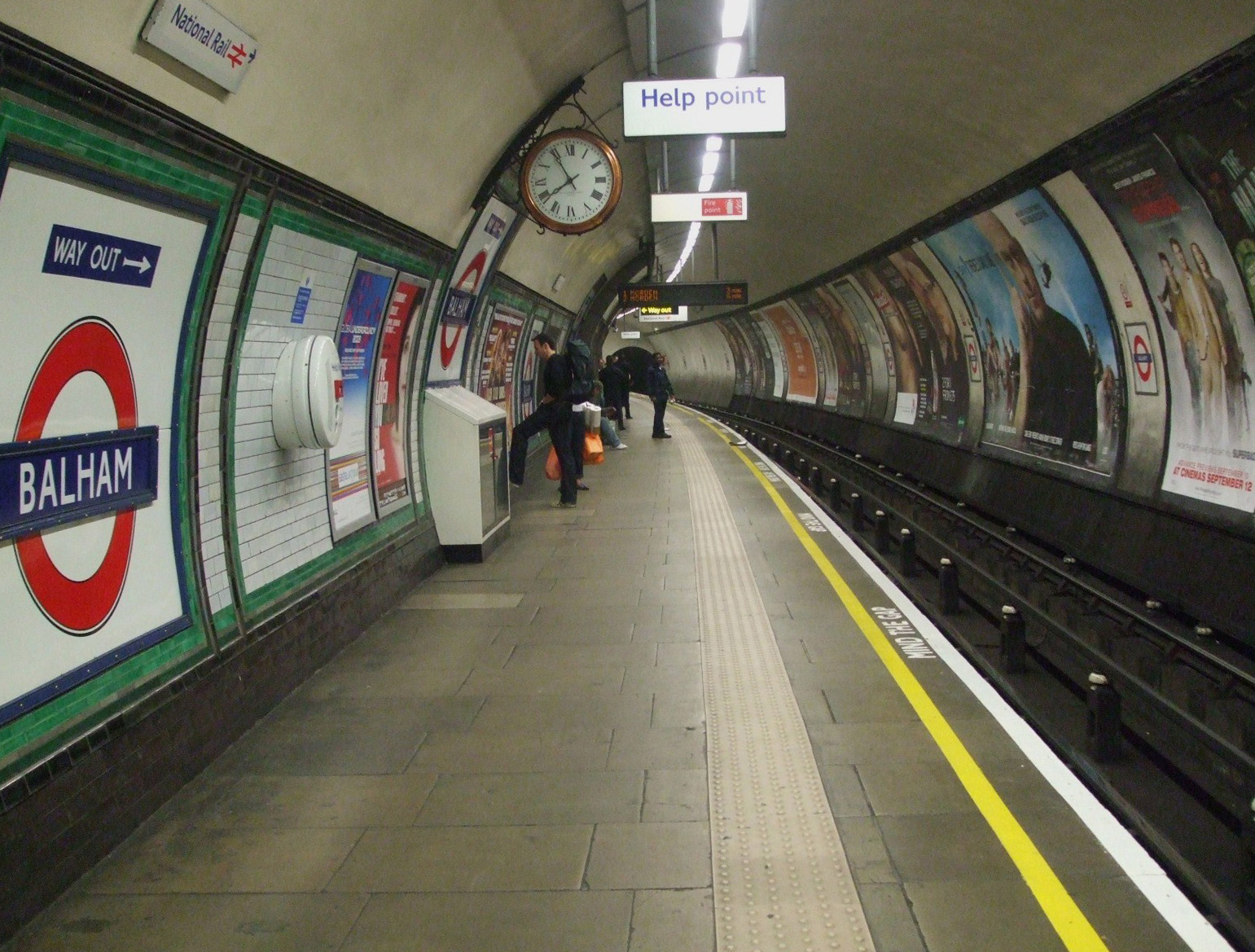
London Underground

Balham station is an interchange between National Rail and London Underground services, in London fare zone 3. The stations connect Balham to both the City of London and the West End. Balham Underground station is on the Northern Line.

Clapham South Underground station is also technically in Balham, lying exactly at the meeting point of Clapham, Battersea and Balham.

Current bus routes serving the area are the 155, 249, 255, 315, 355 and N155.

== Notable people born in Balham ==
- John Marco Allegro, archaeologist.
- Ray Cattouse, former British lightweight boxing champion.
- Gail Elliott, fashion designer and former model.
- Percy Fender (1892) Surrey cricket captain, world record holder and England Test all rounder.
- Fred Again, singer, songwriter, multi-instrumentalist, record producer and remixer.
- Mel Gaynor, musician, drummer of the rock band Simple Minds.
- Jimmy Hill, English footballer, manager and broadcaster.
- Lisa Knapp, folk singer and musician.
- Alan Knight, footballer.
- Jamie Lawrence, footballer.
- Eric Maxon, Shakespearean and early film actor.
- Hannah New, who starred as Eleanor Guthrie in the TV series Black Sails.
- Margaret Rutherford, actress.
- Captain Sensible, singer and musician.
- John Sullivan, writer of Only Fools and Horses.

== Notable people who used to work, study or live in Balham ==
- Adele, singer and songwriter, attended Chestnut Grove School.
- Bob and Margaret, cartoon characters, are former residents.
- Peter Baynham, screenwriter, is a former resident with Richard Herring.
- Sarah Beeny, property developer, businesswoman and broadcaster is a former resident of Balham.
- Marcus Brigstocke, comedian and actor with Rachel Parris.
- Jon Craig, journalist.
- Jack Dee, comedian, actor, writer and producer is a former resident of Balham.
- Gracie Fields, actress, singer and comedian was a former resident.
- Ainsley Harriott, TV chef.
- Richard Herring, comedian and writer, is a former resident with Peter Baynham.
- Stewart Lee, comedian and writer, is a former resident.
- Malcolm McLaren, band manager, musician and entrepreneur, was a former resident with Vivienne Westwood.
- Rachel Parris, comedian, musician and actress with Marcus Brigstocke.
- DBC Pierre, novelist, is a former resident.
- Arthur Smith, comedian.
- Tommy Trinder, comedian and former chairman of Fulham Football Club, was a former resident.
- Vivienne Westwood, fashion designer and businesswoman was a former resident with Malcolm McLaren.

== "Balham, Gateway to the South" ==
For many years Balham was held up to mockery because of the comedy sketch "Balham, Gateway to the South". Written by Frank Muir and Denis Norden, with Peter Sellers as the narrator, it satirised the travelogues of the day, with their faraway exotic locations, by highlighting the supposed tourist attractions of Balham in postwar austerity Britain. The title's origin most probably alludes to a Southern Railway poster "Gateway to the Continent" dating from 1928 by T D Kerr. In 1979 Micky Dolenz of the Monkees directed a short film based on the sketch with Robbie Coltrane playing multiple roles. It was released for broadcast in 1981. The mockery reduced as Balham house prices soared.

== Balham Group ==
In 1932, the Balham Group, the first British Trotskyist group, was expelled from the Communist Party of Great Britain and formed the Communist League.

== See also ==
- Wandsworth Radio
