= Alfred Heaver =

- Born: 10 February 1841; Camberwell or Lambeth, London, England
- Died: 8 August 1901 (aged 60); Dorking, Surrey, England
- Occupation: Property developer
- Known for: Heaver Estate, Balham

Alfred Heaver (10 February 1841 - 8 August 1901) was an English carpenter turned builder and property developer, responsible for the construction of a number of housing estates amounting to thousands of homes in south London, including the Heaver Estate in Balham. He was murdered in 1901 by a relative who nursed a grudge against him.

The Survey of London dubs him "the big-scale yet shadowy South London developer-builder". Bailey specifies that the source of capital for his entrée into large-scale estate development is unclear. Sources provide conflicting information on a number of aspects of his life and work; notably the number of houses developed under his direction; his place of birth; and the value of his estate.

== Biography ==
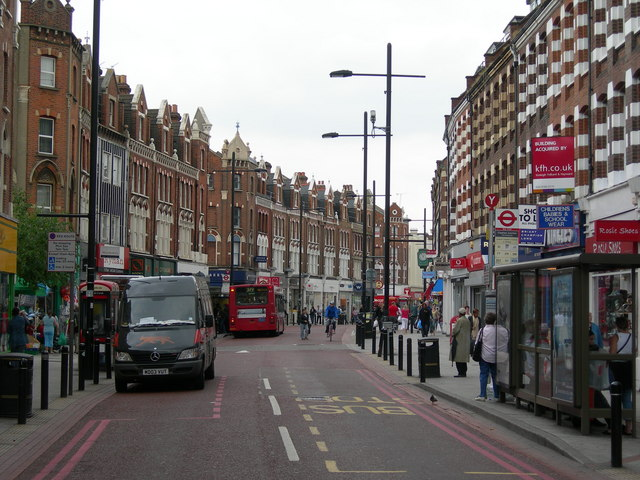
St John's Road in Clapham Junction, developed in the 1880s by Alfred Heaver.

Alfred Heaver was born on 10 February 1841 in Lambeth or Camberwell, the fourth child of George Heaver, a carpenter. At the time of the 6 June 1841 census, the Heaver family is recorded as living at 10 George Street, Camberwell. He followed his father into trade as a carpenter, a fact recorded on the certificate of his marriage to Isabella Luetchford when aged 21.

He started his property development career in 1869 in partnership with Edward Coates, with whom he worked for the remainder of his life. The pair bought five plots on the Conservative Land Society's (CLS) Bolingbroke Park Estate. The CLS, at the time, developed estates in more isolated areas of Battersea where land-prices were low, and offered easy purchase terms of 10% down and monthly or quarterly payments; their main focus was on increasing the number of voters at a time that the franchise depended upon property ownership. Heaver and Coates immediately mortgaged three of the plots, and built properties on the other two, on Bennerley Road (at the time called Beverley Road). The possibility is that they overstretched in this first venture, as they are recorded in March 1871 as living at 2 and 3 Salcott Road - again, properties they had built - in bankruptcy proceedings at the country court of Surrey in Croydon.

Isabella died in June 1874, and in July 1875, Heaver married her sister Patience. Both were daughters of a baker from Tulse Hill and unlikely to have been a source of Heaver's property development capital.

Up to 1878, the Heaver and Coates continued as one of the very many teams of low-volume builders in Battersea, responsible for about 40 constructions in an eight-year period. However a step-change took place in 1878, when Heaver purchased a 4.5 acres (1.8 ha) site to the east of the Bolingbroke Park Estate, on which extensions to Belleville and Wakehurst Roads were constructed, and plots for 70 properties laid out. The site vendor was the CLS, at a price estimated to be around £2,000; it is not known how Heaver managed to finance this purchase, nor the £700-£1,000 cost of laying down the roads and their utilities. Nor is it clear, from the estimated returns from the Belleville venture, how he managed to finance the huge outlay involved in his next venture, the Falcon Estate of more than 500 houses. Bailey speculates, based on road-naming evidence, that Heaver may have been assisted by John Ashdown, Secretary of and surveyor for the CLS, and by Joseph Hiscox, a building contractor.

In the period in which much of south London's terraced housing was laid down, he was the developer of housing estates of varying sizes in Battersea, Wandsworth, Tooting and Balham, as well as Fulham, north of the river Thames. He was, according to a number of contemporary sources, responsible for 4,419 houses constructed in Clapham Junction. However Bailey lists his involvement in a total of 4,023 houses, including those in Balham, Tooting and Fulham; of which 1,157 were in Battersea; albeit Bailey's count includes constructions in the 1878-1898 period only. Heaver's modus operandi appears to have been to purchase the freehold of under-developed properties on the frontier of urban development; in Battersea, often the very large gardens of villas built in a previous era. In conjunction with his surveyor, W. C. Poole, a ground-plan was laid out and architectural specifications drawn up for the houses to be built. Building construction was divided between a number of building contractors working to Heaver's specifications and in some cases constrained to purchase building materials from him. Heaver let building plots on 99-year leases, allowing builders to finance construction on their own account.

Patience died in 1887, and in December 1888, Heaver married Fanny Tutt. He is recorded as living at Brixton Hill until 1889, when he moved into Streatham Elms, a mansion in Balham, with family and eight servants. There he began work on what, in his advertising, he termed the Heaver Estate, in 1890. The estate borders the north-west of Tooting Commons, and comprises Ritherdon Road and 10 streets to the south of it, on which Heaver laid out and contracted with building companies to construct more than 1,000 terraced houses in the Queen Anne style.

Some time around 1896 Heaver and family took possession of a summer property in Westcott near Dorking where on 4 August 1901, whilst walking to church with his wife, he was shot twice, in the back and the head, by his brother-in-law James Young. Young, who had a grievance against Heaver, shot himself and died within the hour. Heaver lingered on for four days before dying on 8 August at Holcombe Cottage, Westcott. The Economist, listing him as late of Oak Lodge, Tooting, reports that he left an estate of £389,833 (equivalent to circa £45 million in 2017 currency). Bailey, citing the Wandsworth Borough News, reports the value to have been above £625,000 (£72m in 2017).

== Heaver developments ==
This list of Heaver developments is incomplete.

Name	Image	Location	Initiated	Completed	Notes	Roads bounding the development () = included in the development	Roads within the estate	Number of houses
Belleville Road; 51.45711°N 0.16446°W		Battersea	1878		Extension of two roads on the Conservative Land Society Bolingbroke Estate; land, road-building and utility provision is estimated to have cost circa £3,000 against ground-rents yielding £420pa	Northcote Road; Webb's Road	Belleville Road (east section); Wakehurst Road (east section)	70
Falcon Park; 51.46920°N 0.17013°W		Battersea	1879	1881	Street names in the estate reflect the then recent Second Anglo-Afghan War (1878–80) and the Anglo-Zulu War (1879)	Battersea Park Road (south); Rowena Crescent - originally called Zulu Crescent (all); Cabul Road (all); Candahar Road (all); Kerrison Road (all); Falcon Road (all)	Afghan Road; Khyber Road; Nepaul Road; Patience Roads; Part of the estate west of Falcon Road is demolished, but previously had roads called Heaver, Kambala, Musjid, Natal and Tugela	587
Fulham Park		Fulham	1880					405
Heaver Park; 51.45794°N 0.16244°W		Battersea	1881		Heaver bought a 12 acres (4.9 ha) site to the east of the CLS Bolingbroke Estate, but sold his interests before development started; the estate was taken forward as Chatto's or the West Side Estate and comprised Leathwaite Road and its side-roads to the west.			0
Dives Estate aka Lavender Sweep; 51.46314°N 0.16645°W		Battersea	1881	1883	Informal name derived from Thomas Dives, last tenant of a villa on a site now occupied by the Welsh Chapel.	Lavender Hill (south); Beauchamp Road (all) - the north-south section was originally called Bleisho Road; St. John's Road (east)	Ilminster Gardens - originally Bullen Road, changed in 1887 to Dives Road and quickly changed to the current name	145
Rose Park		Tooting	1883					192
Trinity Road		Tooting	1884					103
Shrubbery Estate; 51.46285°N 0.16185°W		Battersea	1885	1888	North–south road linking Lavender Hill with Battersea Rise, through what had been the gardens of a villa called The Shrubbery	Lavender Gardens (all)		52
St John's Park; 51.46146°N 0.16881°W		Battersea	1885	1888	Opposite and south of Clapham Junction railway station	St John's Hill; St John's Road; Battersea Rise; Boultflower Road (east side)	Severus Road; Eckstein Road; Comyn Road; Aliwal Road	225
Chestnuts; 51.46431°N 0.16671°W		Battersea	1887	1887	Diagonally opposite the St John's Park estate, the location, adjacent to Battersea's new shopping area, enabled Heaver to command a premium	Lavender Hill; Falcon Road	Mossbury Road	78
Hyde Park		Fulham	1887					388
Heaver Estate; 51.43613°N 0.15353°W		Balham	1888	1910	~1,000 houses between Ritherdon Road and Tooting Common	Ritherdon Road (all); Bedford Hill (east side); Tooting Common; Elmbourne Road (west side); Louisville Road (all); Balham High Road (east side)	Drakefield Road; Streathbourne Road; Huron Road; Manville Road; Bushnell Road; Veronica Road; Terrapin Road; Elmbourne Road; Hillbury Road	1,262
Hoyle Road		Tooting	1895					253
Totterdown		Tooting	1897					263
