= Northcote (Wandsworth ward) =

- Electoral ward for the Wandsworth London Borough Council
- Borough: London Borough of Wandsworth
- County: Greater London
- Population: 12,863 (2021)
- Area: 1.337 km²

Current electoral ward
- Created: 1964
- Seats: 2 (since 2022); 3 (until 2022)
- Party: Conservative Party

Northcote is an electoral ward in the London Borough of Wandsworth. The ward was first used in the 1964 elections, and elected three councillors to Wandsworth London Borough Council until the Local Government Boundary Commission implemented boundary changes in 2022. From 2022, the ward was reduced in size, and subsequently elects two councillors to Wandsworth Borough Council.

== Geography ==
The ward is named after Northcote Road in Wandsworth, and contains most of the residential area between Clapham Common and Wandsworth Common. It is completely within the boundaries of the Battersea Parliamentary Constituency.

== Councillors ==
Election	Councillors	
2022	Aled Richards-Jones (Conservative)	Emmeline Owens (Conservative)
2026	Aled Richards-Jones (Conservative)	James Craig (Conservative)

== Elections ==
=== 2026 ===
Northcote (2)
Party	Candidate	Votes	%
Conservative	Aled Richards-Jones*	2,583	52.1
Conservative	James Craig	2,551	51.4
Labour	Clare Fraser	1,006	20.3
Labour	Jonathan Heywood	853	17.2
Liberal Democrats	Lara Fiorani	684	13.8
Liberal Democrats	Francis Chubb	652	13.1
Green	Joe Taylor	577	11.6
Green	Areej Abuali	574	11.6
Reform	Josh Stanton	235	4.7
Reform	Alex Therrien	204	4.1
Turnout		9,919	56.63
Conservative hold			
Conservative hold			

=== 2022 ===
Northcote (2)
Party	Candidate	Votes	%
Conservative	Emmeline Owens	2,244	53.5
Conservative	Aled Richards-Jones*	2,168	51.7
Labour	Emily Wintle	1,377	32.8
Labour	James Toone	1,094	26.1
Green	Joe Taylor	754	18.0
Liberal Democrats	Ben Morris	544	13.0
Turnout		4,197	48.4
Conservative hold			
Conservative hold			

== See also ==
- List of electoral wards in Greater London
