= Nine Elms (ward) =

Electoral ward in the London Borough of Wandsworth

- Electoral ward for the Wandsworth London Borough Council
- Nine Elms ward boundaries since 2022
- Borough: Wandsworth
- County: Greater London
- Population: 5,396 (2021) (Note: 2021 Census data reported for 2022 ward boundaries)
- Electorate: 2,847 (2022)
- Major settlements: Nine Elms
- Area: 0.7969 square kilometres (0.3077 sq mi)

Current electoral ward
- Created: 2022
- Number of members: 2
- Councillors: Matt Corner; Will Sweet
- Created from: Queenstown
- GSS code: E05014015

Nine Elms is an electoral ward in the London Borough of Wandsworth. The ward was first used in the 2022 elections. It returns two councillors to Wandsworth London Borough Council.

== List of councillors ==
Term	Councillor	Party
2022–present	Matthew Corner	Conservative
2022–2026	Mark Justin (Note: Mark Justin changed parties in 2025.)	Conservative
2022–2026	Mark Justin	Reform
2026–present	Will Sweet	Conservative

== Wandsworth council elections ==
=== 2026 election ===
The election took place on 7 May 2026.

2026 Wandsworth London Borough Council election: Nine Elms (2)
Party	Candidate	Votes	%	±%
Conservative	Matt Corner	702	44.4	
Conservative	Will Sweet	587	37.1	
Labour	Jane Briginshaw	392	24.8	
Green	Matthew Hitchins	335	21.2	
Green	Michael Di Stefano	325	20.6	
Labour	Douglas Oddy	274	17.3	
Reform	Mark Justin	150	9.5	
Reform	Mitch Durrant	144	9.1	
Liberal Democrats	James Fok	143	9.1	
Liberal Democrats	John Williams	110	7.0	
Turnout		3,162	35.71	
Conservative hold		Swing		
Conservative hold		Swing		

=== 2022 election ===
The election took place on 5 May 2022.

2022 Wandsworth London Borough Council election: Nine Elms (2)
Party	Candidate	Votes	%	±%
Conservative	Matt Corner	352	39.9	
Conservative	Mark Justin	328	37.2	
Labour	Alexander Christian	261	29.6	
Labour	Maha Younes	250	28.3	
Liberal Democrats	Mark Gitsham	239	27.1	
Liberal Democrats	Sue Wixley	212	24.0	
Green	Joanna Zeenny	41	4.6	
Green	Andrew Macmillan	34	3.9	
Turnout		882		
Conservative win (new seat)				
Conservative win (new seat)				
