= Shaftesbury and Queenstown =

Electoral ward in the London Borough of Wandsworth

- Electoral ward for the Wandsworth London Borough Council
- Borough: London Borough of Wandsworth
- County: Greater London
- Population: 15,599 (2024)
- Major settlements: Battersea
- Area: 1.314 km²

Current electoral ward
- Created: 2022
- Seats: 3

Shaftesbury and Queenstown is an electoral ward in the London Borough of Wandsworth. The ward was first used in the 2022 elections and elects three councillors to Wandsworth London Borough Council.

== Geography ==
The ward is named after the Shaftesbury Park Estate and Queenstown Road.

== Councillors ==
Election	Councillors		
2022	Sara Apps (Labour)	Aydin Dikerdem (Labour)	Stephen Worrall (Labour)
2026	Sara Apps (Labour)	Aydin Dikerdem (Labour)	Stephen Worrall (Labour)

== Elections ==
=== 2022 ===
Shaftesbury & Queenstown (3)
Party	Candidate	Votes	%
Labour	Sara Apps	1,966	57.7
Labour	Aydin Dikerdem	1,879	55.1
Labour	Stephen Worrall	1,563	45.9
Conservative	Marie Hanson	1,090	32.0
Conservative	Jonathan Clamp	1,077	31.6
Conservative	Keith Kelsall	982	28.8
Green	Max Ellis	668	19.6
Liberal Democrats	James Munro	421	12.4
Turnout		3,408	31.4
Labour win (new seat)			
Labour win (new seat)			
Labour win (new seat)			

=== 2026 ===
Shaftesbury & Queenstown (3)
Party	Candidate	Votes	%
Labour	Sara Louise Beverley Apps	1,927	
Labour	Aydin Dikerdem	1,708	
Labour	Stephen Worrall	1,417	
Green	Jo Bartholomeou	1,129	
Conservative	Imogen Lydia Bath	913	
Conservative	John Locker	845	
Conservative	Alex Mason	799	
Reform	Stephen Edwin Helms	446	
Reform	John Angus Inglis Jones Kincaid	404	
Reform	Natalie Kathleen Wheen	395	
Liberal Democrats	Stephanie Kate Seidman	363	
Liberal Democrats	Mark Graham Bennett	357	
Liberal Democrats	David Kelleher	270	
Turnout			37.2
Labour hold			
Labour hold			
Labour hold			

== See also ==
- List of electoral wards in Greater London
