= Southfields (ward) =

Electoral ward in the London Borough of Wandsworth

- Electoral ward for the Wandsworth London Borough Council
- Borough: London Borough of Wandsworth
- County: Greater London
- Population: 17,707 (2021)
- Major settlements: Southfields
- Area: 1.478 km²

Current electoral ward
- Created: 1965
- Seats: 2 (since 2022); 3 (until 2022)

Southfields is an electoral ward in the London Borough of Wandsworth. The ward was first used in the 1964 elections and elects three councillors to Wandsworth London Borough Council. Southfield was renamed to Southfields in 2002.

== Geography ==
The ward is based on the suburb of Southfields.

== Councillors ==
Election	Councillors	
2022	Kim Caddy (Conservative)	Guy Humphries (Conservative)

== Elections ==
=== 2022 ===
Southfields (2)
Party	Candidate	Votes	%
Conservative	Kim Caddy	1,853	44.2
Conservative	Guy Humphries	1,763	42.0
Labour	Lee Fennell	1,702	40.6
Labour	Pablo John	1,607	38.3
Green	Ingrid Redcliffe	385	9.2
Liberal Democrats	Pat Durai-Bates	375	8.9
Green	Fergal McEntee	323	7.7
Liberal Democrats	Fabio Quaradeghini	261	6.2
Turnout		4,197	47.4
Conservative hold			
Conservative hold			

== See also ==
- List of electoral wards in Greater London
