= London Plus Credit Union =

British not-for-profit member-owned financial co-operative

- Founded: 2012 (2008)
- Type: Industrial and Provident Society
- Location(s): London, SW6; United Kingdom
- Website: londonpluscu.co.uk

London Plus Credit Union Limited is a not-for-profit member-owned financial co-operative, based in Fulham and operating in the City of Westminster and west London boroughs of Hammersmith and Fulham, Kensington and Chelsea, Wandsworth and Hounslow. Wandsworth Plus Credit Union is a trading name of London Plus Credit Union working in partnership with Wandsworth Council in south-west London.

== History ==
Originally established as H&F Credit Union in 2008, the credit union adopted the London Plus name in 2012. It was one of the first wave of 31 credit unions to team up in an initiative managed by the Association of British Credit Unions (ABCUL) in 2013, to force out payday lenders by saving consumers up to £1bn in loan interest repayments. Following the Archbishop of Canterbury's lead, Canon Guy Wilkinson, Dean of Hammersmith and Fulham in the Diocese of London has worked closely with London Plus to promote credit unions over payday lenders, such as Wonga, throughout its operating area.

The credit union was awarded a grant of £100,000 by the Lloyds Banking Group Credit Union Development Fund in 2014, to support its reserves in anticipation of it reaching 10,000 members in 2015.

== Activities ==
Membership of London Plus Credit Union is restricted by common bond to people living or working in the London boroughs of Hammersmith and Fulham, Kensington and Chelsea, Wandsworth, Hounslow and the City of Westminster, employees and residents of various local housing associations, worshippers at parishes in the Hammersmith and Fulham Deanery and Holy Trinity Brompton churches and members of Unite the Union living or working in the capital.

A member of ABCUL (a key supporter and advisor in the process of creating H&F Credit Union), registered under the Industrial and Provident Societies Acts, London Plus Credit Union is authorised by the Prudential Regulation Authority and regulated by the Financial Conduct Authority and PRA. Ultimately, like the banks and building societies, members' savings are protected against business failure by the Financial Services Compensation Scheme.

== See also ==
- Credit unions in the United Kingdom
- British co-operative movement
