= Wandsworth Common (ward) =

Electoral ward in the London Borough of Wandsworth

- Electoral ward for the Wandsworth London Borough Council
- Borough: London Borough of Wandsworth
- County: Greater London
- Population: 16,593 (2021)
- Major settlements: Wandsworth Common
- Area: 2.429 km²

Current electoral ward
- Created: 2002
- Seats: 3

Wandsworth Common is an electoral ward in the London Borough of Wandsworth. The ward was first used in the 2002 elections and elects three councillors to Wandsworth London Borough Council.

== Geography ==
The ward is named after Wandsworth Common.

== Councillors ==
Election	Councillors		
2022	Angela Graham (Conservative)	Peter Graham (Conservative)	Rosemary Birchall (Conservative)
2026	Angela Graham (Conservative)	Peter Graham (Conservative)	Tom Mytton (Conservative)

== Elections ==
=== 2026 ===
Wandsworth Common (3)
Party	Candidate	Votes	%	±%
Conservative	Angela Graham	2,655	15	
Conservative	Peter Graham	2,426	14	
Conservative	Tom Mytton	2,313	13	
Labour	Melanie McLaren	1644	9	
Labour	James Foster	1609	9	
Labour	Ellie Pyemont	1581	9	
Green	Eliza Broadbent	1141	7	
Green	Suzanne Ellis	937	5	
Green	Maximilian Ellis	833	5	
Liberal Democrats	Eileen Arms	477	3	
Reform	Amanda Clarke	469	3	
Reform	Paul Dyke	425	2	
Reform	Colin Stickney	350	2	
Liberal Democrats	Gareth Morgan-Jones	300	2	
Liberal Democrats	David Lane	296	2	
Turnout		17,456		
Conservative hold		Swing		
Conservative hold		Swing		
Conservative hold		Swing		

=== 2022 ===
Wandsworth Common (3)
Party	Candidate	Votes	%
Conservative	Angela Graham	2,699	51.5
Conservative	Peter Graham	2,560	48.8
Conservative	Rosemary Birchall	2,448	46.7
Labour	Rebecca Wilson	1,766	33.7
Labour	Daniel Hogan	1,664	31.7
Labour	Thomas Pollard	1,580	30.1
Green	Glyn Goodwin	740	14.1
Green	Daniel Strathearn	543	10.4
Green	Pat Sharpe	503	9.6
Liberal Democrats	Eileen Arms	323	6.2
Liberal Democrats	Caroline Ogden	277	5.3
Liberal Democrats	Haren Thillainathan	174	3.3
Turnout		5,242	44.8
Conservative hold			
Conservative hold			
Conservative hold			

== See also ==
- List of electoral wards in Greater London
