= Wandsworth London Borough Council =

Local authority for the London Borough of Wandsworth in Greater London, England

- Coat of Arms

- Council logo used since 2025

Type
- Type: London borough council of the London Borough of Wandsworth
- Houses: Unicameral

Leadership
- Mayor: Emmeline Owens, Conservative since 27 May 2026
- Leader: Robert Morritt, Conservative since 22 July 2026
- Chief Executive: Ana Popovici since July 2026

Structure
- Seats: 58 councillors
- Graph of the party split among 58 seats.
- Political groups: Minority administration (29) Conservative (29) Confidence and supply (1) Independent (1) Opposition (28) Labour (28)
- Length of term: Whole council elected every four years

Elections
- Voting system: Plurality at-large (FPTP)
- Last election: 7 May 2026
- Next election: 2 May 2030

Meeting place
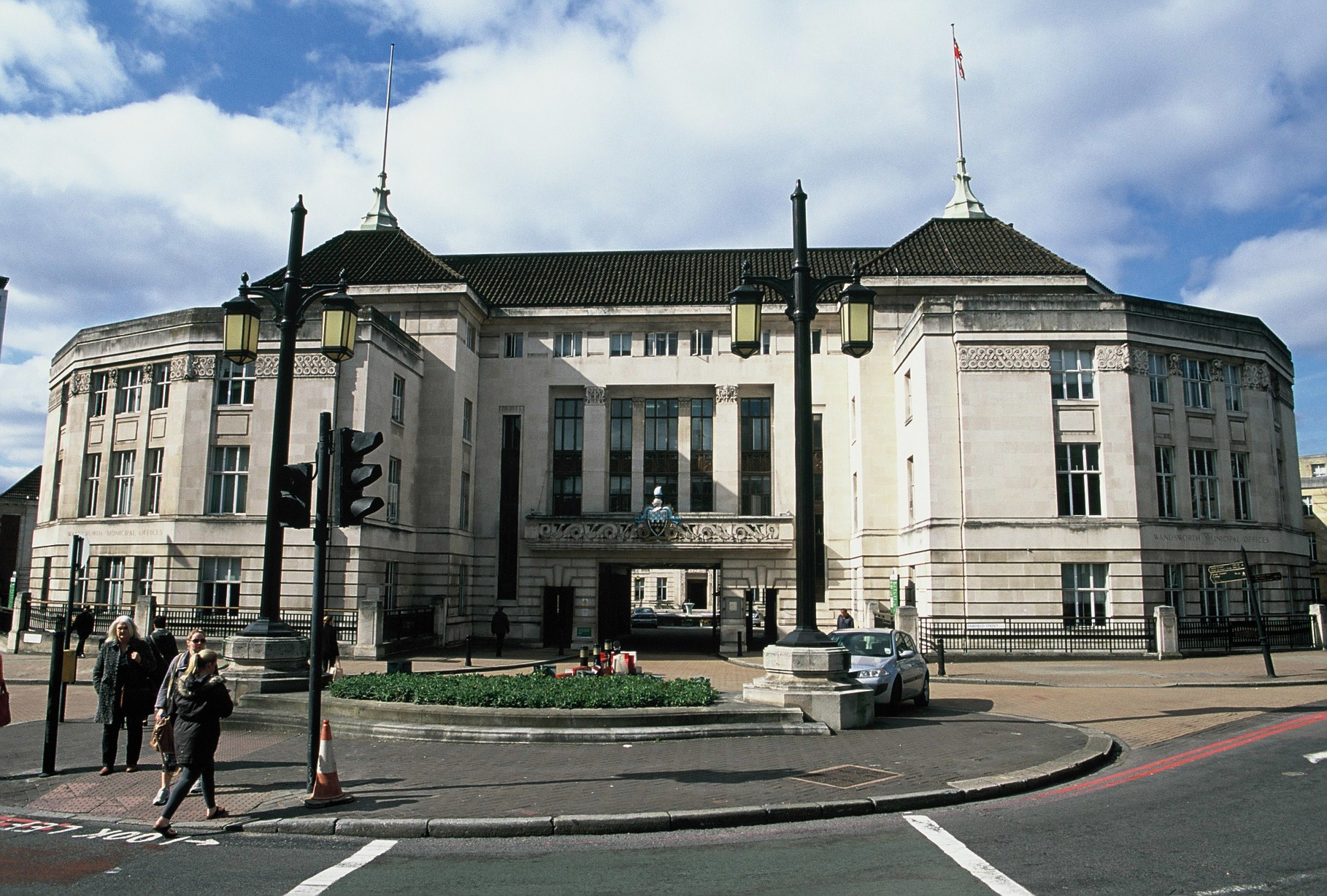
- Town Hall, Wandsworth High Street, London, SW18 2PU

Website
- www.wandsworth.gov.uk

Wandsworth London Borough Council, also known as Wandsworth Council, is the local authority for the London Borough of Wandsworth in Greater London, England. The council is responsible for the provision of certain services in the borough. The council has been under no overall control since the 2026 election, being run by a Conservative minority administration. It is based at Wandsworth Town Hall in the centre of Wandsworth.

== History ==
=== Early history ===
There has been a Wandsworth local authority since 1856 when the Wandsworth District was created, governed by an elected board. It was one of the lower tier authorities within the area of the Metropolitan Board of Works, which was established to provide services across the metropolis of London. In 1889 the Metropolitan Board of Works' area was made the County of London. In 1900 the lower tier was reorganised into metropolitan boroughs, each with a borough council, two of which were called Wandsworth (corresponding to the former Wandsworth District) and Battersea.

=== Creation and 20th century ===
The London Borough of Wandsworth and its council were created under the London Government Act 1963, with the first election held in 1964. For its first year the council acted as a shadow authority alongside the area's outgoing authorities, being the councils of the two metropolitan boroughs of Battersea and Wandsworth. The new council formally came into its powers on 1 April 1965, at which point the old boroughs and their councils were abolished. The council's full legal name is "The Mayor and Burgesses of the London Borough of Wandsworth", but it styles itself Wandsworth Council.

From 1965 until 1986 the council was a lower-tier authority, with upper-tier functions provided by the Greater London Council. The split of powers and functions meant that the Greater London Council was responsible for "wide area" services such as fire, ambulance, flood prevention, and refuse disposal; with the boroughs (including Wandsworth) responsible for "personal" services such as social care, libraries, cemeteries and refuse collection. The Greater London Council was abolished in 1986 and its functions passed to the London Boroughs, with some services provided through joint committees. Wandsworth became a local education authority in 1990 when the Inner London Education Authority was dissolved.

=== 21st century ===
Since 2000 the Greater London Authority has taken some responsibility for highways and planning control from the council, but within the English local government system the council remains a "most purpose" authority in terms of the available range of powers and functions.

From 1992 to 2011, under the leadership of Conservative councillor Edward Lister, Wandsworth was an early adopter of Thatcherite policies of privatisation of street cleaning and refuse collection, and sale of council housing. Between 2007 and 2010 11% of the "affordable" homes built in Wandsworth were for social rent – the lowest in the whole of London. Many ex-council homes became owned by private landlords.

Since 2016 the council has shared a chief executive and other staff with neighbouring Richmond upon Thames Council.

== Powers and functions ==
The local authority derives its powers and functions from the London Government Act 1963 and subsequent legislation, and has the powers and functions of a London borough council. It sets council tax and as a billing authority it also collects precepts for Greater London Authority functions and business rates. It sets planning policies which complement Greater London Authority and national policies, and decides on almost all planning applications accordingly. It is also the local education authority.

== Political control ==
At the 2026 election the council went under no overall control, with the Conservatives being the largest party but falling one seat short of a majority. They subsequently formed a minority administration to run the council with the support of the one independent councillor.

The first election was held in 1964, initially operating as a shadow authority alongside the outgoing authorities until it came into its powers on 1 April 1965. Political control of the council since 1965 has been as follows:

Party in control	Years
Labour	1965–1968
Conservative	1968–1971
Labour	1971–1978
Conservative	1978–2022
Labour	2022–2026
No overall control	2026–present

=== Leadership ===
The role of Mayor of Wandsworth is largely ceremonial. Political leadership is instead provided by the leader of the council. The leaders since 1965 have been:

Councillor	Party	From	To
Sidney Wellbelove	Labour	1964	1966
Sidney Sporle	Labour	1966	1968
Ronald Ash	Conservative	1968	1971
Ian McGarry	Labour	1971	May 1972
Frank Sims	Labour	May 1972	Dec 1972
Ian McGarry	Labour	Dec 1972	1976
John Tilley	Labour	1976	1978
Dennis Mallam	Conservative	1978	1979
Christopher Chope	Conservative	1979	1983
Paul Beresford	Conservative	1983	1992
Edward Lister	Conservative	1992	18 May 2011
Ravi Govindia	Conservative	18 May 2011	25 May 2022
Simon Hogg	Labour	25 May 2022	May 2026
Aled Richards-Jones	Conservative	27 May 2026	22 Jul 2026
Robert Morritt	Conservative	22 Jul 2026	

=== Composition ===
Following the 2026 election, the composition of the council is:

Party	Councillors
Conservative	29
Labour	28
Independent	1
Total	58

The next election is due in 2030.

== Elections ==
Since the last boundary changes in 2022 the council has comprised 58 councillors representing 22 wards, with each ward electing two or three councillors. Elections are held every four years.

== Wards ==
The wards of Wandsworth and number of seats:

1. Balham (3)
2. Battersea Park (3)
3. East Putney (3)
4. Falconbrook (2)
5. Furzedown (3)
6. Lavender (2)
7. Nine Elms (2)
8. Northcote (2)
9. Roehampton (3)
10. Shaftesbury & Queenstown (3)
11. South Balham (2)
12. Southfields (2)
13. St Mary's (3)
14. Thamesfield (3)
15. Tooting Bec (3)
16. Tooting Broadway (3)
17. Trinity (2)
18. Wandle (2)
19. Wandsworth Common (3)
20. Wandsworth Town (3)
21. West Hill (3)
22. West Putney (3)

== Premises ==
The council is based at Wandsworth Town Hall on Wandsworth High Street. The first town hall on the site was completed in 1882 for the old Wandsworth District Board of Works. A red-brick extension to the east was added in 1927, now known as the civic suite. It was followed by a much larger stone-fronted building further again to the east, on the corner with Fairfield Street, which was completed in 1937. The 1882 building was badly damaged during the Blitz and was eventually demolished to make way for a large modern office extension to the Town Hall complex, which was completed in 1975.

== See also ==
- Wandsworth Plus Credit Union
