= Tooting Commons =

Two adjacent areas of common land in south west London, England

Coordinates: 51°26′00″N 0°8′41″W

The south east section of Tooting Bec Common

The Tooting Commons consist of two adjacent areas of common land lying between Balham, Streatham and Tooting, in south west London: Tooting Bec Common and Tooting Graveney Common.

Since 1996, they have been wholly within the London Borough of Wandsworth, which has administered both commons since 1971. Between 1965 and 1995, the eastern part of Tooting Bec Common was within the adjacent London Borough of Lambeth. Wandsworth's Parks Department erroneously described the two historically separate spaces as Tooting Common for many years, but recent signage uses the plural title.

Tooting Bec Common includes Tooting Bec Lido and Tooting Graveney Common includes Tooting Bec Stadium.

== History ==
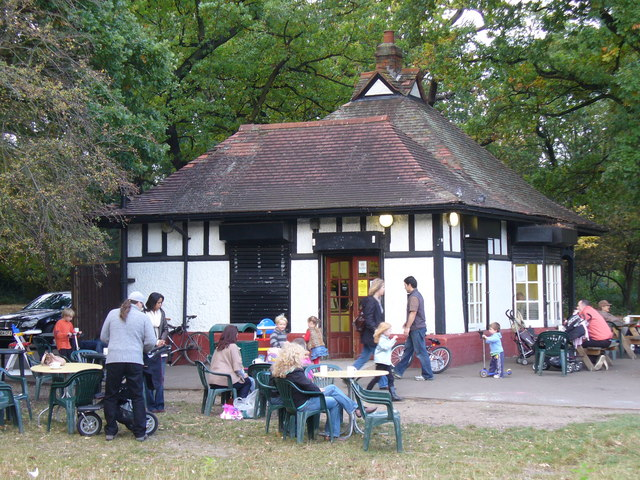
Café on Tooting Bec Common

Tooting Bec Common and Tooting Graveney Common are the remains of common land that once stretched as far as Mitcham.

Tooting Bec Common – the northern and eastern part of the commons – was within the historic parish of Streatham, and takes its name from the area's links to Bec Abbey at Le Bec-Hellouin in Normandy. At various points in history this common has been called Streatham Common, which causes some confusion with the open space a mile to the east of that name. The common is not immediately adjacent to the area now generally known as Tooting Bec.

Tooting Graveney Common – the southern and western part of the commons – was in Tooting parish and a thin line of other common land ran further south down Church Lane towards the River Graveney.

During the 19th century, the commons at Tooting were divided by building of roads and railways – starting with the West End of London and Crystal Palace Railway line in 1855, and the London, Brighton and South Coast Railway line running north – south which opened in 1861 and was further widened in 1901 after this had become the main line to Brighton. The common today continues to be divided into multiple parcels by these busy transport links.

Tooting Bec Common, comprising nearly 152 acres (62 ha), was one of the first commons which the Metropolitan Board of Works (MBW) took action to preserve following the Metropolitan Commons Act 1866 (29 & 30 Vict. c. 122) when in 1873 it acquired the manorial rights for £13,798. In 1875, the MBW acquired Tooting Graveney Common of 66 acres (27 ha) for £3,000.

The road marking the boundary between the two commons (and the historic parish boundary between Streatham and Tooting) is called Doctor Johnson Avenue. This was originally a country path leading from Streatham Place, and Doctor Johnson is reputed to have regularly walked here when visiting Hester Thrale. Until March 1970 it was called simply The Avenue.

Tooting Bec Common includes a number of formal avenues of trees – the first such avenue to be recorded was a line of oaks to commemorate a visit by Elizabeth I in 1600. With the loss of elms along Tooting Bec Road to Dutch Elm Disease, many visitors are now immediately aware of late Victorian era plantings of horse chestnuts on the boundaries, but there are some much older trees – including the oaks parallel to Garrad's Road which are the successors to an avenue first recorded in the 17th century.

In the 1990s the junction of Tooting Bec Road and Church Lane was widened, encroaching on the common. A few metres of grass behind the railings of the former Tooting Bec Hospital (redeveloped as the Heritage Park residential development) are now part of the common in exchange for the lost land.

In 2016, there was a proposal to close Doctor Johnson Avenue and cover the tarmac with grass to make it part of the common. The proposal was overturned after nearly 70% of responses voiced opposition to the idea.

== Wildlife and ecology ==
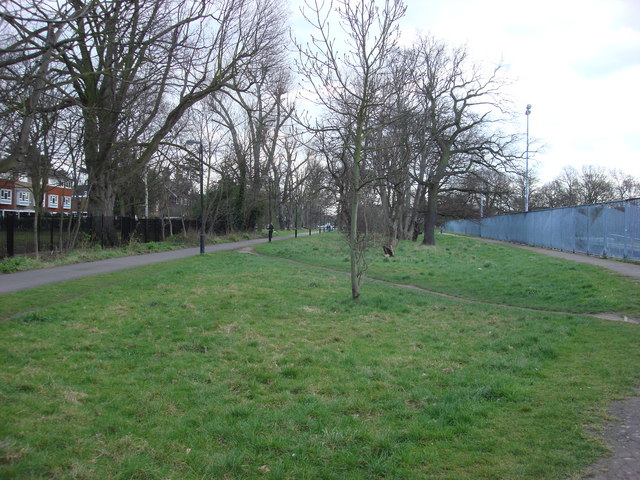
Trees on Tooting Graveney Common

The two commons are recognised as being of Site of Metropolitan importance for Greater London because they include a number of rare wildlife habitats. The common includes areas of acid grassland that are increasingly rare in London, and the site is designated a Site of Metropolitan Importance for Nature conservation partly because of this habitat.

== In popular culture ==
The two commons were the location for an award-winning British Independent Film, Common People (2013), written/directed by and starring Kerry Skinner and Stewart Alexander. The plot concerns a pet Parrot escaping the confines of her cage and flying with parakeets in the south London skies, soaring into the lives of the Common People.
