= Battersea South (London County Council constituency) =

London County Council constituency

- Former constituency for the London County Council

Former constituency
- Created: 1919
- Abolished: 1965
- Member(s): 2 (to 1949); 3 (from 1949)
- Created from: Battersea and Clapham

Battersea South was a constituency used for elections to the London County Council between 1919 and the council's abolition, in 1965. The seat shared boundaries with the UK Parliament constituency of the same name.

== Councillors ==
Year	Name	Party	Name	Party	Name	Party
1919	Edwin Evans	Municipal Reform	William Hammond	Municipal Reform	Two seats until 1949	
1921	Edwin Evans	Municipal Reform	William Hall	Municipal Reform	Two seats until 1949	
1925	Charles James Allpass	Municipal Reform	Harry Selley	Municipal Reform	Two seats until 1949	
1937	Charles James Allpass	Municipal Reform	Edward Curzon	Municipal Reform	Two seats until 1949	
1946	Dorothy Archibald	Labour	David Rapoport	Labour	Two seats until 1949	
1949	Frank Abbott	Conservative	John Morgan	Conservative	Stewart Skingle	Conservative
1952	William S. Hodgson	Labour	Reginald Harold Plant	Labour	Henry Stillman	Labour
1955	Frank Abbott	Conservative	Albert Charles Marshall	Conservative	Douglas Rayment	Conservative
1958	Harbans Lall Gulati	Labour	Peggy Jay	Labour	Marie Jenkins	Labour
1961	Frank Abbott	Conservative	Muriel Bowen	Conservative	Ian Samuel	Conservative

== Election results ==
1919 London County Council election: Battersea South
Party	Candidate	Votes	%	±%
Municipal Reform	Edwin Evans	3,836	26.3	
Municipal Reform	William Hammond	3,683	25.2	
Progressive	William J. West	1,978	13.5	
Progressive	Walter Richard Warren	1,975	13.5	
Labour	Caroline Ganley	1,603	11.0	
Labour	C. Reed	1,523	10.4	
Majority		1,705	11.7	
Municipal Reform gain from Progressive		Swing		
Municipal Reform gain from Progressive		Swing		

Battersea South by-election, 1921
Party	Candidate	Votes	%	±%
Municipal Reform	William Hall	6,358	66.2	
Labour	Caroline Ganley	3,247	33.8	
Majority		3,111		
Municipal Reform hold		Swing		

1922 London County Council election: Battersea South
Party	Candidate	Votes	%	±%
Municipal Reform	Edwin Evans	10,424		
Municipal Reform	William Hall	10,394		
Labour	Caroline Ganley	5,872		
Labour	Alfred George Prichard	5,843		
Municipal Reform hold		Swing		
Municipal Reform hold		Swing		

1925 London County Council election: Battersea South
Party	Candidate	Votes	%	±%
Municipal Reform	Charles James Allpass	7,813		
Municipal Reform	Harry Selley	7,731		
Labour	Edward William Coles	5,530		
Labour	Albert Samuels	5,290		
Municipal Reform hold		Swing		
Municipal Reform hold		Swing		

1928 London County Council election: Battersea South
Party	Candidate	Votes	%	±%
Municipal Reform	Charles James Allpass	7,417		
Municipal Reform	Harry Selley	7,391		
Labour	Charles Henry Young	3,801		
Labour	I. Thomas	3,656		
Liberal	William J. West	2,240		
Liberal	Thomas Patrick Brogan	2,193		
Independent Labour	J. T. Knock	1,250		
Independent Labour	J. F. Lane, Jr	1,241		
Municipal Reform hold		Swing		
Municipal Reform hold		Swing		

1931 London County Council election: Battersea South
Party	Candidate	Votes	%	±%
Municipal Reform	Harry Selley	8,397		
Municipal Reform	Charles James Allpass	8,258		
Labour	Edward William Coles	4,566		
Labour	I. O. Thomas	4,553		
Municipal Reform hold		Swing		
Municipal Reform hold		Swing		

1934 London County Council election: Battersea South
Party	Candidate	Votes	%	±%
Municipal Reform	Harry Selley	8,583		
Municipal Reform	Charles James Allpass	8,350		
Labour	E. R. Smith	7,790		
Labour	Barbara Drake	7,744		
Municipal Reform hold		Swing		
Municipal Reform hold		Swing		

1937 London County Council election: Battersea South
Party	Candidate	Votes	%	±%
Municipal Reform	Edward Curzon	9,800		
Municipal Reform	Charles James Allpass	9,715		
Labour	David Rapoport	9,601		
Labour	Ronald McKinnon Wood	9,542		
Municipal Reform hold		Swing		
Municipal Reform hold		Swing		

1946 London County Council election: Battersea South
Party	Candidate	Votes	%	±%
Labour	David Rapoport	7,982		
Labour	Dorothy Archibald	7,541		
Conservative	E. Partridge	6,057		
Conservative	Edward Curzon	5,622		
Communist	Molly Keith	811		
Communist	J. Evans	774		
Labour gain from Municipal Reform		Swing		
Labour gain from Municipal Reform		Swing		

1949 London County Council election: Battersea South
Party	Candidate	Votes	%	±%
Conservative	John Morgan	11,794		
Conservative	Frank Abbott	11,788		
Conservative	Stewart Skingle	11,406		
Labour	Dorothy Archibald	10,446		
Labour	N. F. Hidden	10,189		
Labour	C. Nairnsey	9,993		
Conservative gain from Labour		Swing		
Conservative gain from Labour		Swing		
Conservative win (new seat)				

1952 London County Council election: Battersea South
Party	Candidate	Votes	%	±%
Labour	William S. Hodgson	11,620		
Labour	Reginald Harold Plant	11,568		
Labour	Henry Stillman	11,561		
Conservative	I. N. Samuel	11,406		
Conservative	Frank Abbott	11,249		
Conservative	Stewart Skingle	11,175		
Labour gain from Conservative		Swing		
Labour gain from Conservative		Swing		
Labour gain from Conservative		Swing		

1955 London County Council election: Battersea South
Party	Candidate	Votes	%	±%
Conservative	Frank Abbott	8,627		
Conservative	Albert Charles Marshall	8,563		
Conservative	Douglas Rayment	8,478		
Labour	Harbans Lall Gulati	8,314		
Labour	Helen Kiely	7,918		
Labour	William S. Hodgson	7,917		
Liberal	N. Goodall	1,148		
Liberal	G. Pedrick	1,049		
Liberal	S. Trustman	839		
Conservative gain from Labour		Swing		
Conservative gain from Labour		Swing		
Conservative gain from Labour		Swing		

1958 London County Council election: Battersea South
Party	Candidate	Votes	%	±%
Labour	Harbans Lall Gulati	8,397		
Labour	Peggy Jay	8,337		
Labour	Marie Jenkins	8,077		
Conservative	Ian Samuel	6,248		
Conservative	Frank Abbott	6,169		
Conservative	F. Horne	6,086		
Liberal	Cecil V. Gittins	2,299		
Liberal	V. J. Howe	2,210		
Liberal	B. Weekley	2,030		
Labour gain from Conservative		Swing		
Labour gain from Conservative		Swing		
Labour gain from Conservative		Swing		

1961 London County Council election: Battersea South
Party	Candidate	Votes	%	±%
Conservative	Ian Samuel	7,899		
Conservative	Muriel Bowen	7,757		
Conservative	Frank Abbott	7,706		
Labour	Harbans Lall Gulati	7,338		
Labour	Marie Jenkins	7,141		
Labour	P. Goldacre	7,070		
Liberal	C. V. Gittins	2,421		
Liberal	C. J. V. Hurley	2,282		
Liberal	B. Weekley	2,032		
Conservative gain from Labour		Swing		
Conservative gain from Labour		Swing		
Conservative gain from Labour		Swing		
