= 1929 Battersea South by-election =

UK Parliamentary by-election

| ← 1924 | 7 February 1929 | 1929 → |
| Candidate | Bennett | Selley | Albu |
| Party | Labour | Unionist | Liberal |
| Popular vote | 11,789 | 11,213 | 2,858 |
| Percentage | 46.13% | 43.87% | 10.00% |
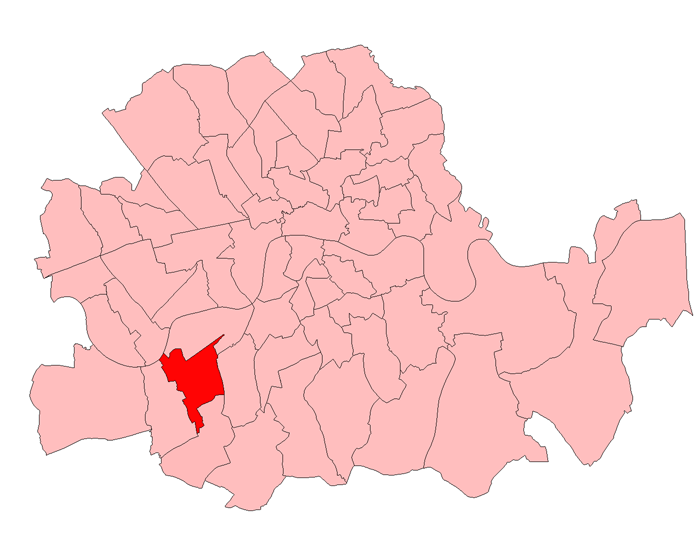
MP before election
Viscount Curzon
Unionist
Subsequent MP
William Bennett
Labour

The 1929 Battersea South by-election was held on 7 February 1929. The by-election was held when the incumbent Conservative MP, Francis Curzon, succeeded to the peerage as Earl Howe. It was won by the Labour candidate William Bennett in a three-way contest.

== Candidates ==
The local Liberal association selected 40 year-old Vivian Claude Albu as their candidate. Albu had stood for the Liberals in the 1922 general election at Battersea North. Labour selected William Bennett, who had been their candidate in Guildford in three general elections between 1918 and 1923. The Conservative Party selected Harry Selley, a builder and member of the London County Council for Battersea South.

== Result ==
Battersea South by-election, 1929
| Party | Candidate | Votes | % | ±% |
|---|---|---|---|---|
| Labour | William Bennett | 11,789 | 46.13 | |
| Conservative | Harry Selley | 11,213 | 43.87 | |
| Liberal | Vivian Claude Albu | 2,858 | 10.00 | New |
| Majority | | 576 | 2.25 | |
| Turnout | | 25,557 | 57.7 | −18.8 |
| Labour gain from Conservative | | Swing | +8.8 | |

== Aftermath ==
A few months later at the next general election Bennett again defeated Selley, this time by 418 votes in a much increased poll. The Liberals were again third, though with a new candidate, the former Mayor of Battersea, Captain William J. West. In 1931 Selley won the seat at the third attempt, defeating Bennett with a majority of over 15,000 votes.
