= Clonea Castle =

Castle in County Waterford, Ireland

Coordinates: 52.1007°N 7.5323°W

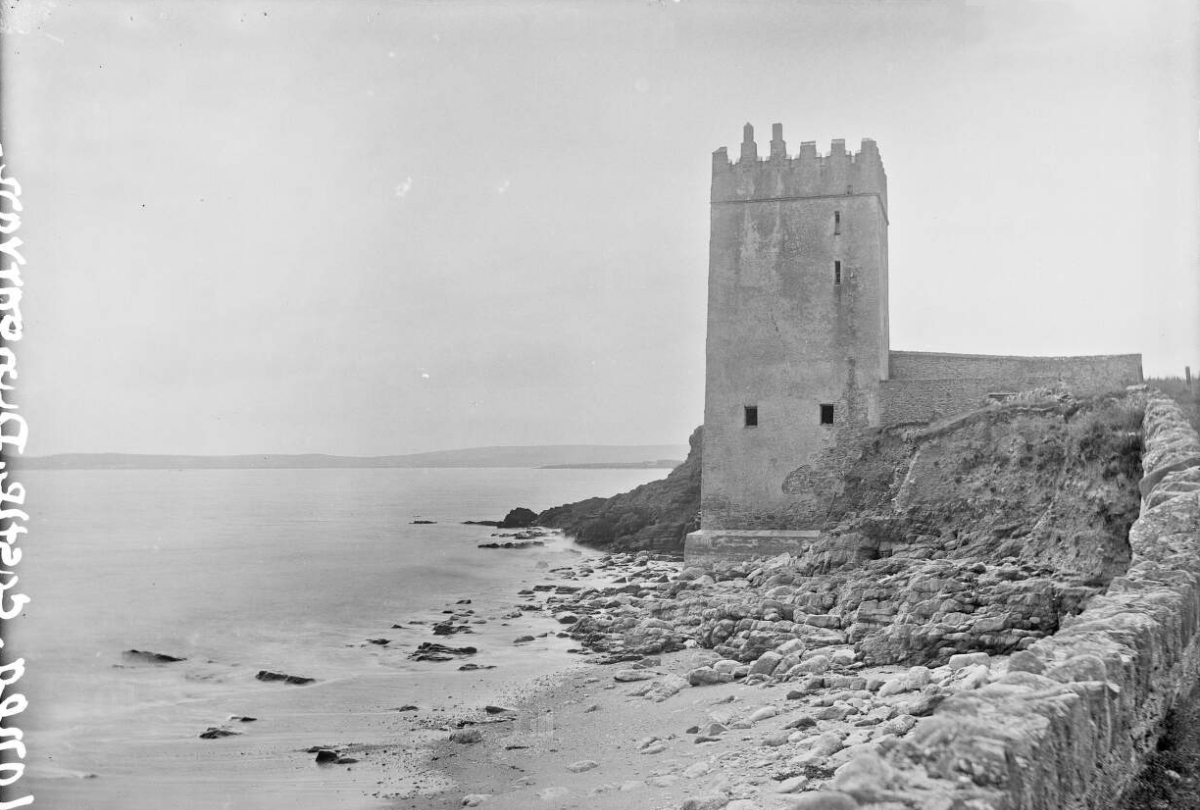
Clonea Castle, photographed by Robert French in the late 19th or early 20th century

Clonea Castle was a castellated tower in County Waterford, Ireland. It was in Clonea parish in the historical barony of Decies-without-Drum in the south of the county. Located in Clonea Lower townland, roughly two and a half miles east of Dungarvan, the castle lay on a rocky outcrop at the edge of the shore by Clonea Beach. It was owned by the Maguire (McGuire) family.

The structure's entry in National Monuments Service records indicate that it was "not an antiquity", but was built in the late 18th or early 19th century, possibly on the site of an earlier Fitzgerald family fortification. While some of the structure remained into the late 20th century, the remaining ruins were largely destroyed by a winter storm in 1990.

Journalist and politician Muriel Bowen (1926–2000) was born on the Clonea Castle estate.
