= Dorothy Archibald =

British politician

The Right Honourable The Lady Archibald

Personal details
- Born: Dorothy Holroyd; January 1895 Liverpool, England
- Died: 22 July 1960 (aged 65)

Dorothy Archibald, Baroness Archibald (January 1895 – 22 July 1960) was a British politician.

Born in Liverpool as Dorothy Holroyd, she studied for a year at the University of Liverpool, then at Girton College, Cambridge. After completing her studies, she became an inspector for a trades board. Immediately after World War I, she travelled to Eastern Europe to undertake relief work for children there.

In 1926, Holroyd married George Archibald, a Labour Party member of Glasgow City Council. The couple had a son, and the family moved to London in 1930, where Archibald devoted her spare time to the London North Western Child Guidance Clinic. This led her to an interest in ophthalmology, and she worked with Ida Mann on a long-term study of possible links between psychological and ophthalmological problems in children. As part of the research, Archibald spent two years at Harvard University, and when it was completed, the University of Oxford awarded her a BSc degree in recognition of her work.

Archibald stood at the Labour candidate in Bath at the 1945 United Kingdom general election, taking a strong second place. She was elected to London County Council in 1946, representing Battersea South, serving a single term. In 1950, she stood for Labour in Wells, increasing the party's vote share. By this time, George had been created Baron Archibald, and she therefore took the title of Lady Archibald.

The family moved to Hitchin in 1951, where Dorothy became a magistrate and was also active in the Family Planning Association.
