= William Bennett (English politician) =

British politician

William Bennett in 1929

William Bennett (7 April 1873 – 4 November 1937) was a British Labour Party politician who served as the Member of Parliament (MP) for Battersea South in London from 1929 to 1931.

He first stood for Parliament at the 1918 general election, when he was unsuccessful in Guildford, a safe seat for the Conservative Party. He contested Guildford again in 1922 and 1923, and did not stand again until the Battersea South by-election in February 1929. The vacancy had arisen when the Conservative MP Francis Curzon succeeded to the peerage as Earl Howe, and in a three-way contest Bennett took the seat for Labour with a majority of 2.1% of the votes. He was re-elected at the general election in May 1929 with a majority of only 1.1%, but at the 1931 general election he was soundly defeated by the Conservative Harry Selley, whose majority was 36.2%.

After his defeat, Bennett stood unsuccessfully at the June 1933 by-election in Hitchin, at a November 1933 by-election in Harborough and in the 1935 general election in Cardiff East.

Bennett was never returned to the House of Commons, but after Labour gained control of the London County Council from the Municipal Reform Party in 1934, he was appointed on 13 March as an alderman of the council.

Parliament of the United Kingdom
Preceded by Viscount Curzon	Member of Parliament for Battersea South; 1929 – 1931	Succeeded by Harry Selley
