= Ernest Partridge =

British politician

Ernest Partridge (10 August 1895 – 20 April 1974) was a Conservative Party politician in the United Kingdom.

At the 1951 general election he was elected member of parliament for the marginal Battersea South constituency, gaining the seat from Labour incumbent Caroline Ganley. Partridge held the seat until the 1964 general election, when it was gained by Labour candidate Ernest Perry.

Parliament of the United Kingdom
Preceded by Caroline Ganley	Member of Parliament for Battersea South; 1951–1964	Succeeded by Ernest Perry
