= Muriel Bowen =

Irish journalist and politician

- Born: 16 January 1926; Dungarvan, County Waterford, Ireland
- Died: 23 August 2000 (aged 74); Dorking, Surrey, England
- Occupation: Journalist

Muriel Bowen (16 January 1926 – 23 August 2000) was an Irish journalist and politician.

Born at Clonea Castle in Dungarvan, County Waterford, Bowen was educated at Mount Anville Secondary School, and Trinty College Dublin. On leaving school, she found work as a journalist with the Irish Independent, writing about horses, and contributing to the society and music columns in the Irish Tatler. She was also a member of Fine Gael, and in 1947 she was appointed to its finance and general purposes committee.

In 1952, Bowen moved to London to work for the Daily Express, then in 1955 at the Evening Standard. She became active in the Conservative Party, and at the 1955 United Kingdom general election stood unsuccessfully in West Ham North. Faced with this disappointing result, she moved to the United States to work for the Washington Post, travelling 40,000 miles around the world in one six-month period.

Returning to London, Bowen was elected in the 1961 London County Council election, in Battersea South, serving until the council's abolition three years later. In the meantime, she was elected to Westminster City Council, one of the 32 new boroughs which came into being as the LCC ceased to exist. Bowen served as a councillor for Baker Street ward from 1964 to 1968.

She began working for The Tatler, but remained active in the Conservatives, and in 1968 wrote "The Fullest Rights", a pamphlet about the history of women in the party. From 1973, she worked at The Sunday Times, and in her spare time she was a leading carriage driver. She also showed horses, and was a member of several hunts.

Bowen died in Dorking, England at the age of 74 due to complications from a blood disorder.
