= Harbans Lall Gulati =

Indian ophthalmologist (1896–1967)

- Born: c. 1896; Punjab, British India
- Died: 13 June 1967 (aged 70)
- Education: Charing Cross Hospital
- Occupations: General practitioner, ophthalmologist, councillor

Harbans Lall Gulati (c. 1896 – 13 June 1967) was an Indian-born physician living in London, who was a councillor for both the Conservative and Labour parties. After the Second World War he took a special interest in the effect of rationing on the health of the population and was an active campaigner for the extension of mobile canteen services to older people who could not queue for rations. He had a special interest in ophthalmology and worked as a general practitioner in Battersea, London for over four decades.

== Early life ==
Gulati, known popularly as "Lall", was born around 1896 in Shaipur, near Lahore, Punjab, India. His exact date of birth is uncertain. He was the tenth son of Dola Ram Gulati and he had one younger sister.

== Career ==
In 1916, Gulati became a medical officer in the Indian Medical Service after completing his medical training in Lahore. In 1919, he was in Amritsar at the time of the Amritsar massacre. In 1920, for reasons unknown, he worked his passage to the United Kingdom where he arrived in Liverpool penniless and walked to London. His qualifications were not recognised in the UK and therefore he repeated his further education and medical training at Charing Cross Hospital. Friendless and without money, he did unskilled work at night to pay for his studies. Eventually qualifying with LRCP and MRCP in 1926, he entered general practice in the largely working-class district of Battersea in London.

Gulati was an active member of the St John and Red Cross organisations. He campaigned to extend mobile canteen services to older people who could not queue for rations in post-war Britain. He was later, in addition, closely connected with the Royal Westminster Ophthalmic Hospital after passing the diploma in ophthalmic medicine and surgery in 1945.

== Politics ==
In 1934, Gulati was elected a councillor for the Conservative Party. However, he resigned from the party in 1947 because of their lack of support for the National Health Service He was a member of the Food Control Committee, where he was concerned about post-war rationing effects on the health of the population and he joined the Socialist Medical Association and the Labour Party, becoming a Labour member of the London County Council for Battersea South and later standing unsuccessfully for parliament. He was a magistrate and a freemason. As an active member of the committee of the Indian YMCA in London, he witnessed its replanning and building.

== Family and personal ==
Gulati married Norah Louisa Knobel on 1 August 1931, at St Michael's Church, Battersea. They had two sons and two daughters, one of whom died at the age of four in 1938. His elder son also became a doctor, specializing in orthopedics. His younger son is a solicitor, and followed his father into local politics, becoming mayor of Reigate & Banstead in 1984. His granddaughter, Anita Gulati, attributed her grandfather's resilience partly to meditation, saying: "my grandfather used to close his consultation room door for 20 minutes to meditate".

== Death and legacy ==
He died suddenly on 13 June 1967 at the age of 70.

Following an interview with his son, Gulati's story was mentioned in Julian M. Simpson's Migrant architects of the NHS; South Asian doctors and the reinvention of British general practice (1940s-1980s), and used to show how imperial legacies and medical migration shaped the UK's healthcare in the first four decades following the founding of the NHS.
