= Ernest Perry (politician) =

British politician

Ernest George Perry (25 April 1910 – 28 December 1998) was a British Labour Party politician.

== Early career ==
Perry was an insurance contractor and served as a councillor (Alderman) on Battersea Borough Council 1934–65 and was Mayor 1955–56, during which time he served as a Justice of the Peace (J.P.), becoming a councillor on the successor London Borough of Wandsworth from 1964. He was President of Battersea Labour Party and Trades Council, and of the Federation of British Cremation Authorities.

== Member of Parliament ==
At the 1964 general election, Perry was elected Member of Parliament for Battersea South. He was a government whip from 1968 to 1970 and again in 1974. He retired as an MP at the 1979 general election, and was succeeded by Alf Dubs.

Parliament of the United Kingdom
| Preceded by Ernest Partridge | Member of Parliament for Battersea South; 1964–1979 | Succeeded by Alf Dubs |
