= Alf Dubs, Baron Dubs =

Anglo-Czech politician and life peer

The Right Honourable The Lord Dubs
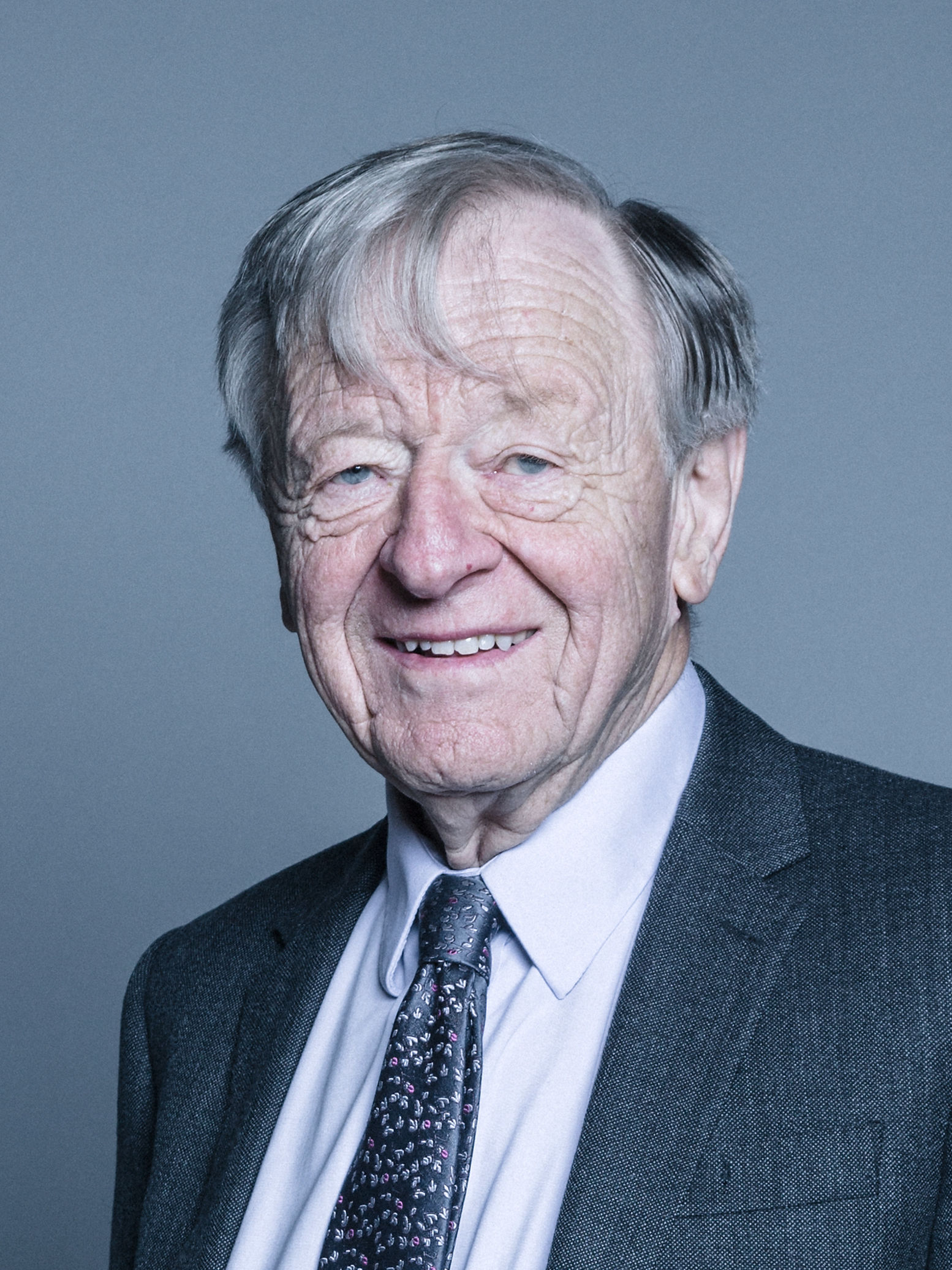
- Official portrait, 2018

Parliamentary Under-Secretary of State for Northern Ireland
- In office 6 May 1997 – 31 December 1999
- Prime Minister: Tony Blair
- Preceded by: The Baroness Denton of Wakefield
- Succeeded by: George Howarth

Member of the House of Lords
- Lord Temporal
- Life peerage 27 September 1994

Member of Parliament: for Battersea South (1979–83) for Battersea (1983–87)
- In office 3 May 1979 – 18 May 1987
- Preceded by: Ernest Perry
- Succeeded by: John Bowis

Personal details
- Born: Alfred Dubs; 5 December 1932 (age 93) Prague, Czechoslovakia
- Party: Labour
- Education: London School of Economics (BSc)

Alfred Dubs, Baron Dubs (born 5 December 1932) is a Labour life peer in the British House of Lords.

Dubs was born in Czechoslovakia to a Jewish father who escaped to Britain when Nazi Germany invaded the country. He then joined his father as a six-year-old refugee, travelling by rail on the Kindertransport. He was educated in the UK and, after a career in local government and advertising, he became the Labour MP for Battersea for eight years. After losing his seat, he was made a baron during the Blair government which he served as a junior minister in the Northern Ireland Office.

== Early life and education ==
Alfred Dubs was born in Prague, Czechoslovakia, to a Jewish father, Hubert, whose family was from Northern Bohemia, and a mother, Bedriska (or Frida) née Ortner, from Austria. Hubert worked in the cotton industry, while Frida was a dietitian.

Dubs lived in Prague as a child. His father left for London when Germany invaded Czechoslovakia in March 1939. His mother applied for permission to leave the country but this was refused at Gestapo Headquarters.

Dubs travelled on the Kindertransport in June 1939 at the age of six. He was one of 669 Czech-resident, mainly Jewish, children saved by British stockbroker Nicholas Winton, and others, from the Nazis on the Kindertransport between March and September 1939. He later said that he clearly remembered leaving Prague station and not touching the food pack given to him by his mother for the next two days. Discussing his experience on a series of special broadcasts organised by Humanists UK for Prison Radio during the COVID-19 pandemic in 2020, Dubs said:

‘I remember the German invasion. I remember how German soldiers were everywhere. We had to tear a picture of the Czech President out of our school books when I was six years old and stick in a picture of Hitler. My Mother put me on a train. There were anxious parents everywhere, not knowing whether they'd ever see their children again. There were German soldiers in the background with swastikas. The older ones knew what was going on. As I said, I was six years old, so I don't think I really understood, except it all seemed rather dramatic. It was a long train journey on hardwood seats but you don't mind if you're a six year old. I didn't know anybody on the train. There were a couple of 100 of us, I think. And so we proceeded on the train to the Dutch border. The older ones cheered because they were out of reach of the Nazis. We reached the Hook of Holland, then Harwich, and then to Liverpool Street, London, where we were met with our dog tags and were allocated to relatives, family or people who would foster us. So that was the story of my journey. If it hadn't been for the Kindertransport, I don't think I'd have survived the Holocaust, because I'm half Jewish myself.’

Hubert had fled to England when the Nazis occupied Czechoslovakia and met young Alf at Liverpool Street station. His mother was initially denied a visa but was able to join him and his father in London on 31 August. The family moved to Cookstown in Northern Ireland but within a year Dubs' father died of a heart attack. His mother found work at a British Restaurant in Cheetham Hill, Manchester, at first scrubbing floors.

From 1943 Dubs attended a boarding school run by the Czechoslovak government-in-exile in Llanwrtyd Wells. Dubs was later educated at Cheadle Hulme School and the London School of Economics. He worked as a local government officer and for Ogilvy and Mather as an account executive before entering politics.

== Career ==
Before being elected for Battersea South, Dubs stood three times. In 1970 he stood for Cities of London and Westminster and was defeated by the Conservative candidate Christopher Tugendhat. In South Hertfordshire in the February and October 1974 general elections, he was beaten by the incumbent Conservative MP Cecil Parkinson.

Dubs was elected in the 1979 general election as a member of parliament for Battersea South and for the next parliament was re-elected – in 1983 for Battersea (a restored seat). He lost the election of 1987 for the same seat. Dubs stood for Battersea again at the 1992 election, only to see the Conservative majority increase, against the national trend. From 1988 to 1995, he was director of the Refugee Council. On 27 September 1994, he was appointed as a Labour life peer with the title of Baron Dubs, of Battersea in the London Borough of Wandsworth. He was Parliamentary Under Secretary of State at the Northern Ireland Office from May 1997 to December 1999.

While Dubs was in the House of Commons, John O'Farrell worked in his office and was a Labour activist in Battersea. In his book, Things Can Only Get Better, O'Farrell described the events leading up to Dubs' surprise defeat by the Conservative John Bowis at the 1987 general election.

Dubs has served on an area health authority and more recently on a mental health trust. He was chair of the Broadcasting Standards Commission until December 2003 and had previously been deputy chair of the Independent Television Commission. He is a trustee of the Open University Foundation.

In the past, he has been a local councillor, chair of the Fabian Society, chair of Liberty, a trustee of Action Aid, a trustee of the Immigration Advisory Service and of a number of other voluntary organisations. He is a vice president of the Fabian Society.

Dubs is a patron of Humanists UK, a patron of Refugee Support Group based in Berkshire, as well as treasurer of the All-Party Parliamentary Humanist Group. In 2025, he spoke on Humanists UK’s podcast, What I Believe, sharing the memories that have shaped his life and career. He said:

‘I was passionately interested in politics when I was younger. When I saw the 1945 General Election, I was living in Manchester. My mum took me to a boarding house near Blackpool. Because the armed forces had to have their vote sent from the Far East, they didn’t start counting until the morning. So the first results come out at midday. And the people in the boarding house said that the BBC were going to broadcast the early election results from the town square as they were coming in – there was no television of course. So I went there and I heard the results and I went back and they said, "Well, what is it?" And I said very proudly something like "Labour, 140, Conservatives, 30". And I heard a voice say, "Oh, my God, it’s the end of England!" And I thought to myself, "Well, if that’s what they think, I don’t agree with them".'

In 2008, Dubs participated in 42 House of Lords debates, well above average for all peers. He has spoken on many varied subjects including the National Probation Service and road safety. Dubs was chair of the Road Safety Foundation.

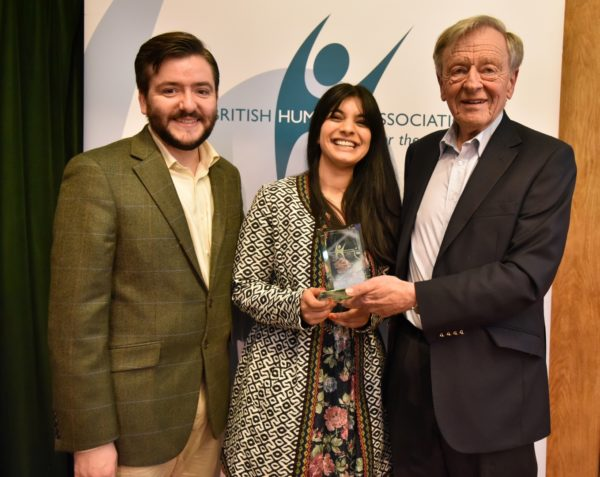
Alf Dubs pictured alongside Andrew Copson and Pavan Dhaliwal as he is awarded Humanist of the Year by Humanists UK in 2016

Dubs lists his main home as a cottage in the Lake District in Cumbria, which enabled him to claim over £26,000 of overnight subsistence expenses in 2007–08, although he has lived in Notting Hill, London, since 1964. In May 2009, he argued in justification that Lords regard the overnight allowance as a payment instead of salary. "We are the only legislators in the world that don't get paid," he said. "The overnight thing is quite generous because it compensates for not having a salary. In practice that's how it works."

Dubs is a vice-president of the Debating Group.

Dubs was awarded Humanist of the Year 2016 by the British Humanist Association at an awards ceremony in London and an Honorary Silver Medal of Jan Masaryk at the Czech Republic Ambassador's residence in London in November 2019.

During the 2020 coronavirus pandemic, Dubs was among a number of Humanists UK patrons to contribute morale-boosting messages of resilience, hope, and inspiration on National Prison Radio.

Lord Dubs is a supporter of the G12++ certificate, a high school-equivalent certificate tailor-made for refugees by Alsama Project, which he has described as "a beacon of hope for a brighter future".

=== Dubs amendment ===
In 2016, Lord Dubs tabled what became section 67 of the Immigration Act 2016, by which UK local authorities admitted unaccompanied minors housed in EU refugee camps who are mainly asylum seekers. It responded to the European migrant crisis. Originally rejected by the House of Commons, the provision was accepted by the government following a second debate and vote in favour by the Lords. In February 2017, the Home Office removed this as a type of permission to enter, in the light of other new provisions targeted at family reunion, after accepting 350 of approximately 3,000 to whom analysts expected it would apply.

A new amendment was proposed by Lord Dubs in January 2020, to require the UK government to negotiate an agreement with the EU to ensure that unaccompanied children in Europe could continue to come to the UK to join a close relative, who was in the process of seeking refugee status, as part of the law effecting the Withdrawal Agreement. The amendment was supported by the House of Lords, but was rejected by the House of Commons due to the Government opposing it. It would expand the laissez-passer system of Restoring Family Links for settled refugees, in line with latest European Union practice. It would also expand the vulnerable person resettlement and vulnerable children resettlement schemes which began in 2016.

Discussing the impact of his early experience fleeing the Nazis on a series of special broadcasts organised by Humanists UK for Prison Radio during the COVID-19 pandemic in 2020, Dubs said:

‘I got involved in politics because I was passionately trying to understand why what had happened to me had happened. So I eventually went into politics and into the Commons, and then got into the House of Lords. One of the issues about which I'm particularly concerned is that of refugees, especially child refugees – understandably, given my own background (although the cause is important, regardless of whether the person advocating it has been a refugee, himself or herself or not). It's not only a humanist cause, but it's one of the causes that I feel very, very close to, and I'm still involved and active in.’

== Personal life ==
Dubs is married to Greta and lives in west London. The couple have two children. He is a keen walker and is very fond of the Lake District.

Dubs was unaware of the role played by Nicholas Winton in his escape to England until the 1988 edition of BBC One's That's Life! show, hosted by Esther Rantzen, which reunited Winton with some of the children, after his wife discovered a Kindertransport-related scrapbook in the attic of their home. Dubs later met Winton in person and campaigned for him to be honoured. Winton was finally knighted in 2003, "for services to humanity, in saving Jewish children from Nazi-occupied Czechoslovakia, 1938–39".

In 2021 Dubs had his Czech citizenship restored, alongside his British one, and thus became the first Czech-British member of the House of Lords.

In June 2025 Dubs was the castaway for BBC Radio 4's Desert Island Discs. His musical choices included pieces by John Coltrane, Mozart, the Beatles and Smetana.

== See also ==
- Road Safety Foundation
- Campaign for Safe Road Design
- Times Guide to the House of Commons

Parliament of the United Kingdom
Preceded by Ernest Perry	Member of Parliament for Battersea South; 1979–1983	constituency abolished
New constituency	Member of Parliament for Battersea; 1983–1987	Succeeded by John Bowis
Non-profit organization positions
Preceded by Martin Barber	Chief Executive of the Refugee Council; 1988–1995	Succeeded by Nick Hardwick
Party political offices
Preceded by Ben Pimlott	Chair of the Fabian Society; 1994–95	Succeeded by Maggie Rice
Orders of precedence in the United Kingdom
Preceded by The Lord Nickson	Gentlemen; Baron Dubs	Followed by The Lord Tope
