= Harry Selley =

British master builder and Conservative Party politician

Sir Harry Ralph Selley (9 December 1871 – 24 February 1960) was a British master builder and Conservative Party politician. He served as the Member of Parliament (MP) for Battersea South in London from 1931 to 1945.

== Career ==
Selley was born in Topsham, Devon, and became a builder's apprentice. He rose to run his own business, and estimated that he had been responsible for the building of more than 25,000 houses in London and its suburbs.

Selley stood unsuccessfully in the 1919 London County Council election in Balham and Tooting. In 1925, he was elected to the council as a member of the majority Municipal Reform Party, representing Battersea South. He was appointed chairman of the council's Housing Committee and of the Hospitals Planning and Development Sub-Committee. He was re-elected to the council in 1928, 1931 and 1934. In the latter year the Municipal Reformers, who were allied to the parliamentary Conservative Party, lost control to the Labour Party. He retired from the council at the 1937 elections.

Selley first stood for Parliament at the Battersea South by-election in February 1929, when he lost by 2.1% of the votes to the Labour Party candidate, William Bennett. He contested the seat again at the general election in May 1929, cutting Bennett's majority to only 1.1%, and at the 1931 general election he defeated Bennett with a majority 36.2%. He was re-elected in 1935, and held the seat until he retired from the House of Commons at the 1945 general election. He was knighted in 1944.

In May 1945, aged 73, he won a bet with housing minister George Hicks by building a four-course wall of 200 bricks in the Commons Courtyard at the Houses of Parliament in less than an hour, whilst wearing a bowler hat. His intention was to demonstrate his belief that the Ministry of Works's target for bricklayers to lay between 200 and 300 bricks per day was inadequate, and after completing the wall he pronounced that 800 was a more reasonable target. An editorial in The Times praised the achievement as "one to warm the heart with admiration". He was national president of Federation of Master Builders from 1945 to at least 1951, when he celebrated his 80th birthday by laying the 80th brick in a wall built in his honour at the Connaught Rooms.

== Family ==
Selley was married in 1896 to Eleanor Kate Westcott, daughter of Thomas Westcott. They had a son and a daughter, and after her death in 1935 he got married again, in 1939, to Margaret Avelyn (Sheila), the widow of Joseph Hendrick. After his death in 1960, at the age of 88, his estate was valued at £63,204.

Parliament of the United Kingdom
Preceded by William Bennett	Member of Parliament for Battersea South; 1931 – 1945	Succeeded by Caroline Ganley
