= Martin Barber =

British politician

Martin Barber, OBE, is the former Director of the United Nations Mine Action Service (UNMAS) at the UN Headquarters in New York from 2000 until his retirement from the UN in 2005. In 2006, he was made an OBE for services to de-mining.

He previously held various senior positions in the UN – including Chief of Policy Development and Advocacy at the Office for Coordination of Humanitarian Affairs, New York; and Deputy Special Representative of the United Nations Secretary-General in Bosnia and Herzegovina, Sarajevo (1996 to 1998).

In 2014 he wrote Blinded by Humanity: Inside the UN’s Humanitarian Operations, which documents his experiences within the UN.

Non-profit organization positions
Preceded by New position	Chief Executive of the Refugee Council; 1982–1988	Succeeded by Alf Dubs
