= Albert Winfield =

Albert Winfield (1868 – 17 February 1932) was a British trade unionist and politician.

Winfield worked for the Battersea Vestry and he became a leading figure in the Vestry Employees' Union, working with John Piper to build the branch up to 200 members. However, they became unhappy with the union leadership, and broke away in 1894, forming the Battersea Vestry Employees' Labour Union.

In 1900, the Battersea Vestry Employees merged into the London-wide Municipal Employees' Association (MEA), and Winfield was appointed as one of the union's first full-time organisers. Two years later, he worked with Richard Davies and Peter Tevenan, touring the country in order to recruit members outside London. He also became the chair of the union's executive committee. In 1907, general secretary Albin Taylor was dismissed by the committee, and it proposed either Tevenan or Winfield as his replacement. Winfield decided to stand aside, and was instead appointed as secretary of the union's London district.

For many years, Winfield was active on Battersea Trades Council, and he served as its president from 1912 until 1917.

In 1909, Winfield was elected to Battersea Council on behalf of the Labour Party. He remained on the council for the rest of his life, pioneering a scheme in which 1,000 poor children from the borough were taken on a day out at the seaside. He unsuccessfully contested Battersea South at the 1922, 1923 and 1924 United Kingdom general elections.

In 1924, the MEA became part of the National Union of General and Municipal Workers, and Winfield continued as an organiser for the union. He began suffering with poor health at the end of 1931, and in February he committed suicide.

Civic offices
Preceded by William James Moore	Mayor of Battersea; 1919–1921	Succeeded by Ruxton Cuthbert Kiloh
