= Battersea South (UK Parliament constituency) =

Parliamentary constituency in the United Kingdom, 1918–1983

- Former borough constituency for the House of Commons
- Boundary of Battersea South in Greater London for the February 1974 general election
- County: County of London, then Greater London

1918–1983
- Seats: One
- Created from: Battersea (abolished and largely succeeded by Battersea North); Clapham (part of)
- Replaced by: Battersea (most), Tooting (part)

Battersea South was a parliamentary constituency, originally in the County of London and later in Greater London. It returned one Member of Parliament (MP) to the House of Commons of the UK Parliament (using first-past-the-post voting).

It was created for the 1918 general election, when the former Battersea constituency was divided in two and the Clapham constituency was reduced in size, losing both of its Battersea wards of the four in total. Battersea South was abolished for the 1983 general election, when the bulk of its territory was reunited with Battersea North to form a new Battersea seat. The south of its area formed a new Tooting seat.

== Boundaries ==
Map of boundaries 1974–1983

Dates	Local authority	Maps	Wards
1918–1950	Metropolitan Borough of Battersea		Bolingbroke, Broomwood, St John, Shaftesbury, and Winstanley
1950–1974	Metropolitan Borough of Battersea (before 1965); London Borough of Wandsworth (after 1965)		Bolingbroke, Broomwood, Lavender, Nightingale, St John, Shaftesbury, Stormont, and Thornton
1974–1983	London Borough of Wandsworth		Balham, Earlsfield, Fairfield, Nightingale, and Northcote

A map showing the wards of Battersea Metropolitan Borough as they appeared in 1916

The seat was created by the Representation of the People Act 1918. When seats were redistributed by the Representation of the People Act 1948 the boundaries of the constituency were altered to contain only four wards, and Winstanley ward was transferred to Battersea North. However the wards of the borough were redrawn in 1949 prior to the next general election in 1950. Accordingly, changes were made under the House of Commons (Redistribution of Seats) Act 1949. Of the 16 new wards, eight were included in each of the Battersea North and South constituencies.

In 1965 Battersea became part of the London Borough of Wandsworth. This, however made no immediate change to the parliamentary constituencies. It was not until the general election of February 1974 that the constituency boundaries were altered. The Shaftesbury and St John's wards were transferred to Battersea North, while the redrawn constituency incorporated areas previously in the Clapham and Putney seats. These boundaries were used until abolition.

In 1966, 11.6% of the constituency was born in the New Commonwealth.

The constituency was abolished in 1983. Most of its area (Balham, Fairfield and Northcote wards) went to the recreated Battersea seat, with part (Earlsfield and Nightingale wards) passing to Tooting.

== Members of Parliament ==
Election	Member	Party	Notes
1918	Viscount Curzon	Conservative	Became ineligible following his succeeding to the peerage as Earl Howe
1929 by-election	William Bennett	Labour	
1931	Sir Harry Selley	Conservative	
1945	Caroline Ganley	Labour Co-operative	
1951	Ernest Partridge	Conservative	
1964	Ernie Perry	Labour	
1979	Alf Dubs	Labour	Contested Battersea following redistribution
1983	constituency abolished: see Battersea		

== Election results ==
=== Elections in the 1970s ===
General election 1979: Battersea South
Party	Candidate	Votes	%	±%
Labour	Alf Dubs	13,984	45.1	–2.7
Conservative	Wellesley Wallace	13,652	44.0	+5.7
Liberal	Jennifer Ware	2,802	9.0	–4.3
National Front	A Perry	561	1.8	New
Majority		332	1.1	–8.4
Turnout		31,000	70.9	+7.0
Registered electors		43,712		
Labour hold		Swing	–4.2	

General election October 1974: Battersea South
Party	Candidate	Votes	%	±%
Labour	Ernest Perry	14,284	47.8	+5.3
Conservative	Wellesley Wallace	11,433	38.3	+0.6
Liberal	Jennifer Ware	3,971	13.3	–4.2
More Prosperous Britain	Thomas Keen	170	0.6	New
Majority		2,851	9.5	+4.7
Turnout		29,856	63.9	–9.1
Registered electors		46,724		
Labour hold		Swing	+2.3	

General election February 1974: Battersea South
Party	Candidate	Votes	%	±%
Labour	Ernest Perry	14,431	42.6	–2.1
Conservative	Anthony Bradbury	12,778	37.7	–10.7
Liberal	Gerard Mulholland	5,919	17.5	+10.5
National Front	John Clifton	787	2.3	New
Majority		1,653	4.9	N/A
Turnout		33,916	73.0	+9.2
Registered electors		46,448		
Labour gain from Conservative (Notional.)		Swing	+4.3	

1970 notional result
Party	Vote	%
Conservative	16,600	48.4
Labour	15,300	44.6
Liberal	2,400	7.0
Turnout	34,300	63.8
Electorate	53,724	

General election 1970: Battersea South
Party	Candidate	Votes	%	±%
Labour	Ernest Perry	10,925	49.5	–3.4
Conservative	Ian Samuel	9,227	41.8	+3.6
Liberal	Raymond Benad	1,183	5.4	–3.5
National Front	Tom Lamb	716	3.2	New
Majority		1,698	7.7	–7.0
Turnout		22,050	63.6	–9.4
Registered electors		34,687		
Labour hold		Swing	–3.5	

=== Elections in the 1960s ===
General election 1966: Battersea South
Party	Candidate	Votes	%	±%
Labour	Ernest Perry	13,651	52.9	+6.1
Conservative	Ian Samuel	9,861	38.2	–2.3
Liberal	Basil Weekley	2,276	8.8	–3.8
Majority		3,790	14.7	+8.4
Turnout		25,788	73.0	+0.7
Registered electors		35,350		
Labour hold		Swing	+4.2	

General election 1964: Battersea South
Party	Candidate	Votes	%	±%
Labour	Ernest Perry	12,253	46.8	+4.5
Conservative	Ernest Partridge	10,615	40.6	–7.7
Liberal	David Layton	3,294	12.6	+3.2
Majority		1,638	6.3	N/A
Turnout		26,162	72.3	–6.6
Registered electors		36,186		
Labour gain from Conservative		Swing	+6.1	

=== Elections in the 1950s ===
General election 1959: Battersea South
Party	Candidate	Votes	%	±%
Conservative	Ernest Partridge	14,203	48.3	+0.7
Labour Co-op	Geoffrey Rhodes	12,451	42.3	–3.1
Liberal	William Mattinson	2,774	9.4	+2.4
Majority		1,752	6.0	+3.8
Turnout		29,428	78.9	–1.8
Registered electors		37,320		
Conservative hold		Swing	+1.9	

General election 1955: Battersea South
Party	Candidate	Votes	%	±%
Conservative	Ernest Partridge	15,044	47.6	–3.1
Labour	Eric Hurst	14,365	45.4	–3.9
Liberal	Alan Cooper-Smith	2,219	7.0	New
Majority		679	2.1	+0.7
Turnout		31,628	80.6	–5.0
Registered electors		39,239		
Conservative hold		Swing	+0.4	

General election 1951: Battersea South
Party	Candidate	Votes	%	±%
Conservative	Ernest Partridge	17,731	50.7	+5.5
Labour Co-op	Caroline Ganley	17,237	49.3	+3.0
Majority		494	1.4	N/A
Turnout		34,968	85.6	–0.0
Registered electors		40,848		
Conservative gain from Labour Co-op		Swing	+1.2	

General election 1950: Battersea South
Party	Candidate	Votes	%	±%
Labour Co-op	Caroline Ganley	16,142	46.3	–15.2
Conservative	Ernest Partridge	15,774	45.2	+6.8
Liberal	Clifford Tyers	2,949	8.5	New
Majority		368	1.1	–22.0
Turnout		34,865	85.6	+12.7
Registered electors		40,722		
Labour Co-op win (new boundaries)				

=== Election in the 1940s ===
General election 1945: Battersea South
Party	Candidate	Votes	%	±%
Labour Co-op	Caroline Ganley	19,275	61.5	+18.9
Conservative	Ernest Partridge	12,050	38.5	–18.9
Majority		7,225	23.1	N/A
Turnout		31,325	72.9	+6.1
Registered electors		42,987		
Labour Co-op gain from Conservative		Swing	+18.9	

=== Election in the 1930s ===
General election 1935: Battersea South
Party	Candidate	Votes	%	±%
Conservative	Harry Selley	21,268	57.3	–9.6
Labour	Herbert Romeril	15,821	42.7	+11.8
Majority		5,447	14.7	–21.5
Turnout		37,089	66.8	–5.9
Registered electors		55,546		
Conservative hold		Swing	–10.7	

General election 1931: Battersea South
Party	Candidate	Votes	%	±%
Conservative	Harry Selley	27,857	67.0	+24.2
Labour	William Bennett	12,822	30.8	–13.0
New Party	Leslie Cuming	909	2.2	New
Majority		15,035	36.2	N/A
Turnout		41,588	72.7	+0.2
Registered electors		57,197		
Conservative gain from Labour		Swing	+18.6	

=== Election in the 1920s ===
General election 1929: Battersea South
Party	Candidate	Votes	%	±%
Labour	William Bennett	18,113	43.8	+1.5
Unionist	Harry Selley	17,695	42.8	–14.9
Liberal	William West	5,516	13.3	N/A
Majority		418	1.1	N/A
Turnout		41,324	72.5	–14.4
Registered electors		57,018		
Labour gain from Unionist		Swing	+8.2	

1929 Battersea South by-election
Party	Candidate	Votes	%	±%
Labour	William Bennett	11,789	45.6	+3.3
Unionist	Harry Selley	11,213	43.4	–14.3
Liberal	Vivian Albu	2,858	11.1	New
Majority		576	2.2	N/A
Turnout		25,557	57.7	–18.8
Registered electors		44,786		
Labour gain from Unionist		Swing	+8.8	

Curzon

General election 1924: Battersea South
Party	Candidate	Votes	%	±%
Unionist	Francis Curzon	19,588	57.7	+5.7
Labour	Albert Winfield	14,371	42.3	–5.7
Majority		5,217	15.4	+11.4
Turnout		33,959	76.5	+13.0
Registered electors		44,369		
Unionist hold		Swing	+5.7	

General election 1923: Battersea South
Party	Candidate	Votes	%	±%
Unionist	Francis Curzon	14,558	52.0	–9.5
Labour	Albert Winfield	13,440	48.0	+9.5
Majority		1,118	4.0	–19.1
Turnout		27,998	63.5	–1.9
Registered electors		44,062		
Unionist hold		Swing	–9.5	

General election 1922: Battersea South
Party	Candidate	Votes	%	±%
Unionist	Francis Curzon	17,685	61.5	–6.6
Labour	Albert Winfield	11,050	38.5	+23.7
Majority		6,635	23.1	–30.4
Turnout		28,735	65.5	+12.1
Registered electors		43,891		
Unionist hold		Swing	–15.2	

=== Election in the 1910s ===
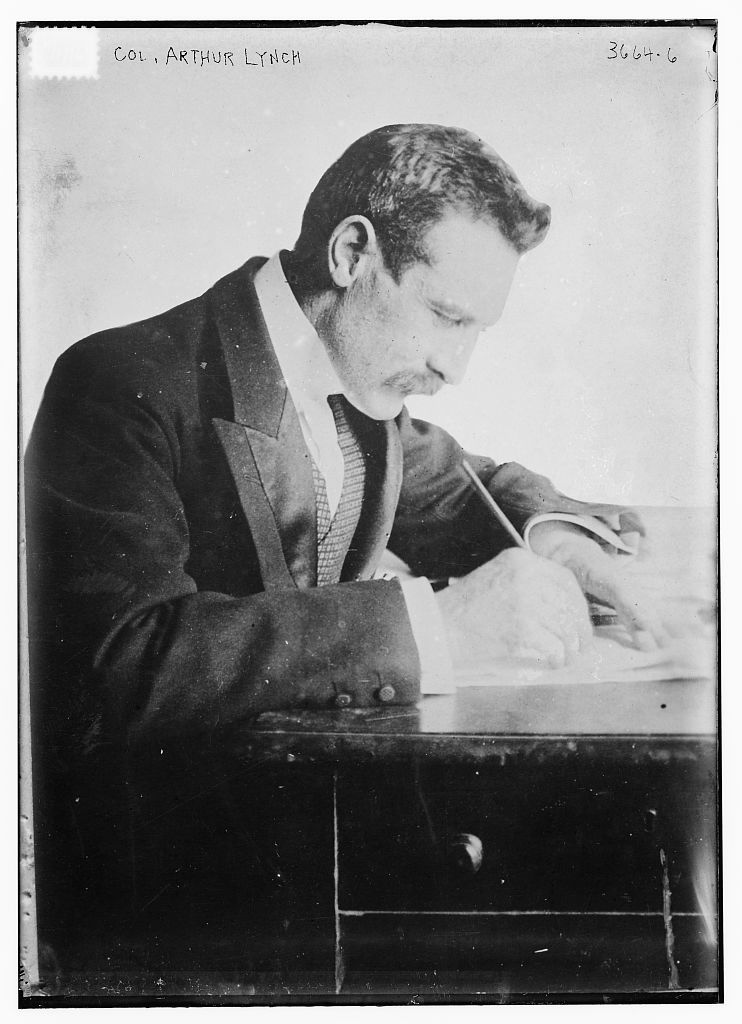
Lynch

General election 1918: Battersea South
Party		Candidate	Votes	%
C	Unionist Party (UK)	Francis Curzon	15,670	68.2
	Labour	Arthur Lynch	3,383	14.7
	Liberal	Joseph Molden	2,273	9.9
	Independent	John Jenkin*	1,657	7.2
Majority			12,287	53.5
Turnout			22,983	53.4
Registered electors			43,036	
	Unionist win (new seat)			
C indicates candidate endorsed by the coalition government.

* Jenkin was supported by and possibly the nominee of the local National Federation of Discharged and Demobilized Sailors and Soldiers branch.
