= Caroline Ganley =

British politician (1879–1966)

Caroline Selina Ganley CBE JP
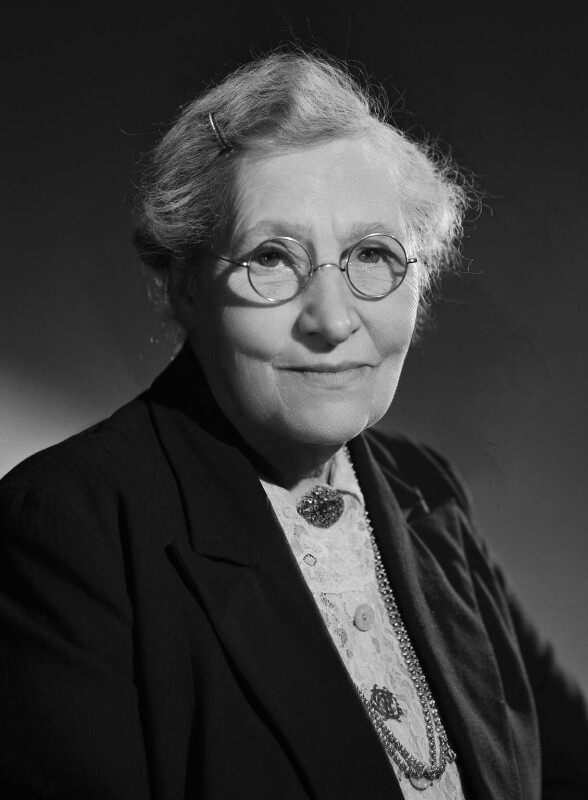
- Ganley in 1947

Member of Parliament for Battersea South
- In office 5 July 1945 – 24 October 1951
- Prime Minister: Clement Attlee
- Preceded by: Sir Harry Selley
- Succeeded by: Ernest Partridge

Personal details
- Born: Caroline Selina Blumfield; 16 September 1879 Plymouth
- Died: 3 August 1966 (aged 86)
- Party: Labour and Co-operative Party

Caroline Selina Ganley, CBE, JP (née Blumfield; 16 September 1879 – 3 August 1966) was an English Labour and Co-operative Party politician.

== Early life ==
Ganley was born on 16 September 1879 in East Stonehouse, Devon, the daughter of a James Blumfield, a bombardier in the Royal Artillery, and Selina Mary Blumfield.

== Political career ==
She became politically active in opposition to the Boer War, declaring herself a pacifist, and joined the Social Democratic Federation that year. She actively supported women's suffrage and helped set up what would become the Women's Labour League branch in Battersea. She became involved in the British Committee of the International Congress for Peace and Freedom in 1914. A letter she wrote to the Sunday Chronicle meant that the wives of servicemen received their allowances through the Post Office.

In 1919, Ganley was one of three women elected to Battersea Council.

Ganley was a school manager and governor, becoming a Justice of the Peace in 1920, one of London's first female magistrates after the Sex Disqualification (Removal) Act 1919 came into force. She joined the Labour and Co-operative Parties and served on Battersea Council from 1919 to 1925, where she chaired the Health and Child Welfare Committee. She later sat on London County Council (from 1925 to 29 and 1934 to 37), and was a member of the London County Education Committee. She unsuccessfully contested the Paddington North seat at the 1935 general election.

At the 1945 general election, Ganley was elected as Member of Parliament for Battersea South. Her maiden speech dealt with national health care, and during her time in Parliament she helped to establish the National Health Service. She narrowly held the seat in 1950 but was defeated by Ernest Partridge in 1951.

Ganley was elected a director of the West London Co-operative Society in 1918 and served on the board of its successor, the London Co-operative Society for many years and as president from 1942 to 1946 as its first woman president. She held national positions in the Women's Co-operative Guild and was one of the speakers at its diamond jubilee celebrations at the Royal Albert Hall in 1943. She was appointed a CBE in 1953. She returned to Battersea Council from 1953 to 1965. A Battersea Society Blue Plaque commemorating her was unveiled in 2018 on the house she and her husband lived at in Battersea.

== Personal life ==
Ganley married tailor's cutter James Ganley in July 1901, with whom she had two sons and one daughter.

Parliament of the United Kingdom
Preceded by Sir Harry Selley	Member of Parliament for Battersea South; 1945–1951	Succeeded by Ernest Partridge
