= Lambeth London Borough Council elections =

A map showing the wards of Lambeth since 2022

Lambeth London Borough Council is elected every four years.

== Summary results of elections ==
Summary of council election results:

Year	Labour	Conservative	Liberal Democrats (Note: Liberal Party, 1964–1978; SDP–Liberal Alliance, 1982–1986.)	Green (Note: Green Party (UK), 1986–1990.)	Council control after election
1964	42	18	0	—	Labour
1968	3	57	0	—	Conservative
1971	51	9	0	—	Labour
1974	46	14	0	—	Labour
1978 (Note: Boundary changes increased the number of seats by four.)	42	22	0	—	Labour
1982	32	27	5	—	No overall control
1986	40	21	3	0	Labour
1990	40	20	4	0	Labour
1994 (Note: Boundary changes took place but the number of seats remained the same. (Note: The Bromley, Croydon, Lambeth, Lewisham and Southwark (London Borough Boundaries) Order 1993) (Note: The Croydon, Lambeth and Southwark (London Borough Boundaries) Order 1993) (Note: The Lambeth, Merton and Wandsworth (London Borough Boundaries) Order 1993))	24	16	24	0	No overall control
1998	41	5	18	0	Labour
2002 (Note: Boundary changes reduced the number of seats by one.)	28	7	28	0	No overall control
2006	39	6	17	1	Labour
2010	44	4	15	0	Labour
2014	59	3	0	1	Labour
2018	57	1	0	5	Labour
2022 (Note: Boundary changes took place but the number of seats remained the same.)	58	0	3	2	Labour
2026	26	0	8	29	No overall control

== Borough result maps ==
2002 results map

2006 results map

2010 results map

2014 results map

2018 results map

2022 results map

2026 results map

== Wards ==
Since the last boundary changes in 2022 the council has comprised 63 councillors representing 25 wards, with each ward electing two or three councillors. Elections are held every four years. The wards are:

- Brixton Acre Lane (3)
- Brixton North (3)
- Brixton Rush Common (3)
- Brixton Windrush (2)
- Clapham Common and Abbeville (2)
- Clapham East (2)
- Clapham Park (3)
- Clapham Town (3)
- Gipsy Hill (2)
- Herne Hill and Loughborough Junction (3)
- Kennington (3)
- Knight's Hill (3)
- Myatt's Fields (2)
- Oval (3)
- St Martin's (2)
- Stockwell East (2)
- Stockwell West and Larkhall (3)
- Streatham Common and Vale (3)
- Streatham Hill East (2)
- Streatham Hill West and Thornton (2)
- Streatham St Leonard's (3)
- Streatham Wells (2)
- Vauxhall (3)
- Waterloo and South Bank (2)
- West Dulwich (2)

=== 2002–2022 ===
The wards between 2002 and 2022 (each electing three councillors) were:

- Bishop's
- Brixton Hill
- Clapham Common
- Clapham Town
- Coldharbour
- Ferndale
- Gipsy Hill
- Herne Hill
- Knight's Hill
- Larkhall
- Oval
- Prince's
- St Leonard's
- Stockwell
- Streatham Hill
- Streatham South
- Streatham Wells
- Thornton
- Thurlow Park
- Tulse Hill
- Vassall

=== 1978–2002 ===
The wards between 1978 and 2002 (each electing three councillors) were:

- Angell
- Bishop's
- Clapham Park
- Clapham Town
- Ferndale
- Gipsy Hill
- Herne Hill
- Knight's Hill
- Larkhall
- Oval
- Prince's
- St Leonard's
- St Martin's
- Stockwell
- Streatham Hill
- Streatham South
- Streatham Wells
- Thornton
- Thurlow Park
- Town Hall
- Tulse Hill
- Vassall

=== 1965–1978 ===
The wards between 1965 and 1978 (each electing three councillors) were:

- Angell
- Bishop's
- Clapham Park
- Clapham Town
- Ferndale
- Herne Hill
- Knight's Hill
- Larkhall
- Leigham
- Oval
- Prince's
- St Leonard's
- Stockwell
- Streatham South
- Streatham Wells
- Thornton
- Thurlow Park
- Town Hall
- Tulse Hill
- Vassall

== By-election results ==
=== 1964–1968 ===
There were no by-elections.

=== 1968–1971 ===
Clapham Park by-election, 27 June 1968
Party	Candidate	Votes	%	±%
Conservative	M. F. Brown	1341		
Labour	M. A. Kelly	470		
Liberal	S. J. Beaven	165		
Turnout			17.6%	

St Leonard's by-election, 27 June 1968
Party	Candidate	Votes	%	±%
Conservative	V. Bogazzi	1837		
Conservative	R. Turtill	1824		
Liberal	D. E. Delaney	172		
Labour	S. Gittins	167		
Liberal	K. L. Phelps	152		
Labour	B. P. Hargreaves	150		
Independent	W. G. Boaks	27		
Turnout			19.0%	

Thurlow Park by-election, 21 November 1968
Party	Candidate	Votes	%	±%
Conservative	D. F. How	1455		
Labour	G. F. Culbard	844		
National Front	D. H. Garrad	318		
Liberal	E. Hawthorne	146		
Turnout			22.6%	

Town Hall by-election, 2 October 1969
Party	Candidate	Votes	%	±%
Conservative	J. S. Steele	1214		
Labour	D. S. Speakman	833		
National Front	W. C. Cheeseman	74		
Turnout			20.1%	

Vassall by-election, 20 November 1969
Party	Candidate	Votes	%	±%
Labour	F. W. QuenauIt	808		
Conservative	D. G. Llewellyn	803		
National Front	J. Archer	34		
Turnout			16.1%	

=== 1971–1974 ===
There were no by-elections.

=== 1974–1978 ===
Clapham Park by-election, 16 October 1975
Party	Candidate	Votes	%	±%
Conservative	S. J. Beaven	1,578		
Labour	J. D. Parine	1,050		
Liberal	Tim Clement-Jones	403		
Turnout			27.6	

Ferndale by-election, 1 April 1976
Party	Candidate	Votes	%	±%
Labour	A. R. Painter	1,026		
Conservative	C. A. Williams	513		
Liberal	C. M. Williams	196		
Turnout			21.6	

Angell by-election, 18 November 1976
Party	Candidate	Votes	%	±%
Labour	C. K. Montaut	701		
Conservative	S. Kane	481		
Housewife	K. Mott	224		
National Party	F. Sandland	165		
Socialist Workers	K. Singh	34		
Anti-National Front	A. Whereat	28		
United Anti-Fascist	E. E. A. Sparks	17		
Turnout			20.8	

Clapham Park by-election, 17 March 1977
Party	Candidate	Votes	%	±%
Conservative	A. Williams	1,580		
Labour	P. Dean	916		
Liberal	Tim Clement-Jones	390		
National Front	C. P. K. Skeats	215		
Turnout			29.3	

Streatham Wells by-election, 17 March 1977
Party	Candidate	Votes	%	±%
Conservative	M. P. R. Malynn	1,936		
Labour	F. Henry	640		
National Front	V. F. Lillington	213		
Turnout			26.3	

=== 1990–1994 ===
Town Hall by-election, 18 July 1991
Party	Candidate	Votes	%	±%
Labour	Christopher N. Cattermole	1,226	37.5	
Conservative	Gianfranco J. Letizia	994	31.4	
Liberal Democrats	Gary Woolton	736	23.3	
Green	Roger C. L. Baker	207	6.5	
Turnout			37.5	
Labour hold		Swing		

The by-election was called following the resignation of Cllr Dick Sorabji.

St Martin's by-election, 12 December 1991
Party	Candidate	Votes	%	±%
Conservative	Anthony R. Green	1,221	61.8	
Labour	Michele S. J. Singh	452	22.9	
Liberal Democrats	Rajnikant R. Patel	229	11.6	
Green	Maureen J. Owens	74	3.7	
Turnout			26.0	
Conservative gain from Labour		Swing		

The by-election was called following the resignation of Cllr Susan Smith.

Streatham Hill by-election, 13 February 1992
Party	Candidate	Votes	%	±%
Lib Dem Focus Team	Euan J. Bayliss	1,475	38.9	
Conservative	Gilbert E. W. S. Evemy	1,416	37.3	
Labour	Daniel J. Hughes	860	22.7	
Green	Susan A. Whall	44	1.2	
Turnout			43.8	
Lib Dem Focus Team gain from Conservative		Swing		

The by-election was called following the resignation of Cllr Colin Mason.

Stockwell by-election, 10 December 1992
Party	Candidate	Votes	%	±%
Labour	Simon H. Adams	797	38.0	
Liberal Democrats	Gary Woolton	690	32.9	
Conservative	Keith L. Best	566	27.0	
Independent	Stephen D. Bradshaw	22	1.0	
Green	Jason H. Evers	21	1.0	
Turnout			29.8	
Labour hold		Swing		

The by-election was called following the resignation of Cllr Ian Mallett.

Streatham Hill by-election, 10 December 1992
Party	Candidate	Votes	%	±%
Lib Dem Focus Team	Jeremy F. Coninx	1,586	52.3	
Conservative	Bernard A. R. Gentry	930	30.7	
Labour	Daniel J. Hughes	402	13.3	
Independent	Roderick J. Pearson	114	3.8	
Turnout			33.8	
Lib Dem Focus Team gain from Conservative		Swing		

The by-election was called following the resignation of Cllr Kenneth Sharvill.

Angell by-election, 4 March 1993
Party	Candidate	Votes	%	±%
Liberal Democrats	Raymond D. Woolford	841	40.3	
Labour	Stephen A. Cooley	778	37.3	
Conservative	Peter A. Cannon	350	16.8	
Green	William S. B. Collins	74	3.5	
Independent	Stephen D. Bradshaw	42	2.0	
Turnout			28.6	
Liberal Democrats gain from Labour		Swing		

The by-election was called following the resignation of Cllr John Tuite.

Bishop's by-election, 25 March 1993
Party	Candidate	Votes	%	±%
Lib Dem Focus Team	Sally Prentice	1,503	52.0	
Labour	Matthew J. Swindells	749	25.9	
Militant Labour	Steven P. Nally	336	11.6	
Conservative	Peter K. Wilde	300	10.4	
Turnout			41.6	
Lib Dem Focus Team gain from Labour		Swing		

The by-election was called following the death of Cllr Graham Nicholas.

Streatham Hill by-election, 10 June 1993
Party	Candidate	Votes	%	±%
Lib Dem Focus Team	John R. Bradescu	1,974	64.2	
Conservative	John B. Bloomfield	645	21.0	
Labour	Daniel J. Hughes	425	13.8	
Green	Roger C. L. Baker	33	1.1	
Turnout			33.7	
Lib Dem Focus Team gain from Conservative		Swing		

The by-election was called following the resignation of Cllr Gloria Hutchens.

Oval by-election, 22 July 1993
Party	Candidate	Votes	%	±%
Liberal Democrats	Marietta Crichton-Stuart	1,506	52.0	
Labour	Peter G. O'Connell	858	29.6	
Militant Labour	Steven P. Nally	246	8.5	
Conservative	Andrew Selous	231	7.9	
Green	Jason H. Evers	56	1.9	
Turnout			37.2	
Liberal Democrats gain from Labour		Swing		

The by-election was called following the resignation of Cllr Joseph Singh.

=== 1994–1998 ===
Ferndale by-election, 2 March 1995
Party	Candidate	Votes	%	±%
Labour	Simon H. Adams	982		
Labour	Mohammed Z. Abu-Bakr	963		
Liberal Democrats	Euan J. Bayliss	846		
Liberal Democrats	Martin Morris	824		
Independent	Catherine Valentine	155		
Conservative	Alison J. Davis	129		
Independent	Raymond D. Woolford	129		
Conservative	Simon N. Nayyar	100		
Turnout				
Labour hold		Swing		
Labour hold		Swing		

The by-election was called following the resignations of Cllrs Denis Cooper-King and John Harrison.

Princes by-election, 1 June 1995
Party	Candidate	Votes	%	±%
Liberal Democrats	Sandra J. Lawman	1,222		
Labour	Michael A. J. Leyland	1,026		
Conservative	Richard J. Patient	131		
Green	Sheila Freeman	55		
Independent	Anne Boyle	21		
SDP	Stephen R. Chamberlain	17		
Turnout				
Liberal Democrats hold		Swing		

The by-election was called following the resignation of Cllr Roger Liddle.

Knight's Hill by-election, 21 March 1996
Party	Candidate	Votes	%	±%
Liberal Democrats	Robert S. McConnell	1,287		
Labour	Ian J. Darby	1,246		
Conservative	Natalie C. Ross-Pears	808		
Green	William S. B. Collins	44		
Turnout				
Liberal Democrats gain from Conservative		Swing		

The by-election was called following the resignation of Cllr Peter Evans.

Clapham Town by-election, 14 November 1996
Party	Candidate	Votes	%	±%
Labour	Eileen M. Hogan	1,247	41.9	
Conservative	John Swannick	906	30.4	
Liberal Democrats	Maria Gardner-Brown	758	25.5	
Green	Tean J. Mitchell	46	1.5	
Socialist (GB)	Christopher I. McColl	20	0.7	
Majority		341	11.5	
Turnout		2,977	34.7	
Labour hold		Swing		

The by-election was called following the resignation of Cllr Joseph Callinan.

Larkhall by-election, 1 May 1997
Party	Candidate	Votes	%	±%
Labour	Kevin D. Craig	2,552	55.3	+8.2
Liberal Democrats	Jonathan A. Simpson	1,338	29.0	−12.4
Conservative	Caroline King	524	11.4	+1.8
Green	Roger C. L. Baker	200	4.3	+4.3
Majority		1,214	26.3	
Turnout		4,614	56.9	
Labour hold		Swing		

The by-election was called following the resignation of Cllr Margaret Jones.

=== 1998–2002 ===
Streatham South by-election, 6 May 1999
Party	Candidate	Votes	%	±%
Labour	David Malley	1,515	45.7	−11.0
Liberal Democrats	Kathleen Ward	996	30.1	+22.3
Conservative	Joanna Barker	753	22.7	−12.8
Independent	Andrew Morris	48	1.5	+1.5
Majority		519	15.6	
Turnout		3,312	38.5	
Labour hold		Swing		

The by-election was called following the resignation of Cllr Alan White.

Vassall by-election, 19 August 1999
Party	Candidate	Votes	%	±%
Labour	Dan Sabbagh	840	48.5	+3.1
Liberal Democrats	Adeline Aina	618	35.7	−0.3
Conservative	Anthony Shakespeare	194	11.2	+4.9
Green	Peter Crush	55	3.2	−6.0
Independent	Keith Langton	25	1.4	−1.8
Majority		222	12.8	
Turnout		1,732	18.0	
Labour hold		Swing		

The by-election was called following the resignation of Cllr Michael Cruickshanks.

Knight's Hill by-election, 7 June 2001
Party	Candidate	Votes	%	±%
Labour	Antony Grayling	2,293	49.2	+5.8
Liberal Democrats	Joel Robinson	1,300	27.9	−6.7
Conservative	Jessica Lee	788	16.9	+0.1
Independent	Romano Barca	278	6.0	+6.0
Majority		993	21.3	
Turnout		4,659	53.6	
Labour hold		Swing		

The by-election was called following the resignation of Cllr Paul Connolly.

Thornton by-election, 7 June 2001
Party	Candidate	Votes	%	±%
Labour	Elizabeth "Lib" Peck	1,497	45.0	−1.2
Liberal Democrats	John Pindar	1,379	41.5	−0.9
Conservative	Peter Younghusband	448	13.5	+6.8
Majority		118	3.5	
Turnout		3,324	53.6	
Labour hold		Swing		

The by-election was called following the resignation of Cllr Anthony Hewitt.

=== 2002–2006 ===
Stockwell by-election, 7 August 2003
Party	Candidate	Votes	%	±%
Labour	Peter Bowyer	1,065	46.4	+13.0
Liberal Democrats	Rosario "Ros" Munday	1,001	43.6	−8.6
Conservative	Alistair Fletcher	133	5.8	+0.2
Green	Graham Jones	95	4.1	−4.7
Majority		64	2.8	
Turnout		2,294	24.4	
Labour gain from Liberal Democrats		Swing		

The by-election was called following the resignation of Cllr Gabriel Fernandes.

Streatham South by-election, 20 October 2005
Party	Candidate	Votes	%	±%
Labour	Mark E. Bennett	1,466	49.2	+9.1
Liberal Democrats	Ahmad Ali	1,211	40.7	+6.0
Conservative	Lisabeth Liell	301	10.1	−8.1
Majority		255	8.5	
Turnout		2,978	31.7	+1.1
Labour hold		Swing		

The by-election was called following the death of Cllr Tim Sargeant.

=== 2006–2010 ===
Vassall by-election, 20 March 2008
Party	Candidate	Votes	%	±%
Liberal Democrats	Steve Bradley	1,209	50.4	+14.9
Labour	Andy Flannagan	859	35.8	−8.4
Conservative	Stuart Barr	206	8.6	−2.8
Green	George Graham	109	4.5	+4.5
English Democrat	Janus Polenceus	8	0.3	+0.3
Independent	Leo Syron	7	0.3	+0.3
Majority		350	14.6	
Turnout		2,398	25.9	
Liberal Democrats gain from Labour		Swing		

The by-election was called following the death of Cllr Liz Atkinson.

Prince's by-election, 4 June 2009
Party	Candidate	Votes	%	±%
Labour	Mark Harrison	1,726	40.7	−9.2
Liberal Democrats	John Roberts	1,396	32.9	7.4
Conservative	Michael C. Poole-Wilson	707	16.7	2.2
Green	Joseph Healy	320	7.5	0.4
English Democrat	Janus Polenceus	93	2.2	2.2
Majority		330	7.8	−16.6
Turnout		4,242		
Labour hold		Swing		

The by-election was called following the resignation of Cllr Sam Townend.

=== 2010–2014 ===
Tulse Hill by-election, 1 July 2010
Party	Candidate	Votes	%	±%
Labour	Ruth Ling	1,235	52.2	−0.3
Liberal Democrats	Terence Curtis	745	31.5	+1.2
Green	George Graham	256	10.8	+4.5
Conservative	Alan Blackburn	94	4.0	−2.6
UKIP	Robin Lambert	36	1.5	N/A
Majority		490		
Turnout		2,366	21.18	
Labour hold		Swing		

The by-election was called following the resignation of Cllr Toren Smith.

Brixton Hill by-election, 17 January 2013
Party	Candidate	Votes	%	±%
Labour	Martin Tiedemann	1,593	62.6	+21.9
Green	Andrew Child	344	13.5	−2.6
Liberal Democrats	Liz Maffei	274	10.8	−29.7
Conservative	Timothy Briggs	165	6.4	−6.0
TUSC	Steve Nally	72	2.8	N/A
UKIP	Elizabeth Jones	63	2.5	N/A
Majority		1,249	49.1	%
Turnout		2,544	22.7	
Labour hold		Swing		

The by-election was called following the resignation of Cllr Steve Reed.

Tulse Hill by-election, 25 July 2013
Party	Candidate	Votes	%	±%
Labour	Mary Atkins	1,575	69.3	
Liberal Democrats	Amna Ahmad	277	12.2	
Green	Bernard Atwell	177	7.8	
TUSC	Steve Nally	76	3.3	
Conservative	Timothy Briggs	74	3.3	
UKIP	Elizabeth Jones	64	3.0	
Independent	Valentine Walker	20	0.9	
Socialist (GB)	Adam Buick	11	0.5	
Majority		1,298	57.1	
Turnout		2,274	20.0	
Labour hold		Swing		

The by-election was called following the death of Cllr Ruth Ling.

Vassall by-election, 28 November 2013
Party	Candidate	Votes	%	±%
Labour	Paul Gadsby	1,119	48.1	
Liberal Democrats	Colette Thomas	468	28.7	
Conservative	Kelly Ben-Maimon	153	10.8	
Green	Rachel Laurence	113	4.8	
UKIP	Elizabeth Jones	87	4.6	
TUSC	Steven Nally	44	1.8	
Socialist (GB)	Danny Lambert	22	0.9	
Turnout		2,326	28.4	
Labour hold		Swing		

The by-election was called following the resignation of Cllr Kingsley Abrams.

=== 2014–2018 ===
Knight's Hill by-election, 14 August 2014
Party	Candidate	Votes	%	±%
Labour	Sonia Winifred	1,265	63.7	−7.3
Conservative	Heidi Nicholson	248	12.5	+0.4
Green	Christopher Hocknell	230	11.6	+7.1
UKIP	Robin Lambert	99	5.0	+1.9
Liberal Democrats	Robert Hardware	94	4.7	−2.4
Independent	Nelly Amos	51	2.6	N/A
Majority		1,017	51.2	
Turnout		1,987		
Labour hold		Swing		

The by-election was called following the disqualification of Cllr Sonia Winifred.

Prince's by-election, 7 May 2015
Party	Candidate	Votes	%	±%
Labour	Valia McClure	3,452	44.5	
Liberal Democrats	Adrian Hyyrylainen-Trett	1,748	22.5	
Conservative	Gareth Wallace	1,518	16.6	
Green	Marie James	901	11.6	
TUSC	Kingsley Abrahams	99	0.1	
Socialist (GB)	Danny Lambert	42	0.1	
Majority		1,704		
Turnout		7,760		
Labour hold		Swing		

The by-election was called following the resignation of Cllr. Chris Marsh.

Gipsy Hill by-election, 9 June 2016
Party	Candidate	Votes	%	±%
Labour	Luke Murphy	1,220	43.4	
Green	Peter Elliott	1,184	42.1	+
Conservative	Leslie Maruziva	210	7.5	
Liberal Democrats	Rosa Jesse	84	3.0	
UKIP	Elizabeth Jones	73	2.6	
Independent	Robin Lambert	24	0.9	N/A
TUSC	Steven Nally	19	0.7	N/A
Majority		36	1.3	
Turnout				
Labour hold		Swing		

The by-election was called following the death of Cllr Niranjan Francis.

=== 2018-2022 ===
Coldharbour by-election, 13 September 2018
Party	Candidate	Votes	%	±%
Labour	Scarlett O'Hara	1,739	58.2	▼7.8
Green	Michael Groce	912	30.5	▲15.0
Liberal Democrats	Doug Buist	148	5.0	▼0.4
Conservative	Yvonne Stewart-Williams	119	4.0	▼2.4
Women's Equality	Sian Fogden	47	1.6	N/A
UKIP	Robert Stephenson	21	0.7	N/A
Majority		827	27.7	▼22.8
Turnout		2,994	24.8	
Labour hold		Swing		

The by-election was caused by the death of Matthew Parr.

Thornton by-election, 7 February 2019
Party	Candidate	Votes	%	±%
Labour	Stephen Donnelly	1,154	44.7	▼18.2
Liberal Democrats	Rebecca MacNair	845	32.8	▲23.1
Green	Adrian Audsley	251	9.7	▼1.7
Conservative	Martin Reid	247	9.6	▼6.4
Women's Equality	Leila Fazal	46	1.8	N/A
UKIP	John Plume	36	1.4	N/A
Majority		309	11.9	▼52.0
Turnout			27.5	
Labour hold		Swing		

The by-election was caused by the resignation of Jane Edbrooke.

Thornton by-election, 11 April 2019
Party	Candidate	Votes	%	±%
Labour	Nanda Manley-Browne	998	41.5	▼21.4
Liberal Democrats	Matthew Bryant	979	40.7	▲30.1
Green	Adrian Audsley	171	7.1	▼4.3
Conservative	Martin Reid	166	6.9	▼9.1
Women's Equality	Leila Fazal	53	2.2	N/A
UKIP	John Plume	39	1.6	N/A
Majority		19	0.7	▼63.2
Turnout			25.5	
Labour hold		Swing		

The by-election was caused by Lib Peck who resigned as Leader of Lambeth Council and as a councillor in order to take the role as the Director of the Mayor of London's newly established Violence Reduction Unit.

=== 2022-2026 ===
Vauxhall by-election, 5 October 2023
Party	Candidate	Votes	%	±%
Labour	Tom Swaine-Jameson	595	42.0	▼11.1
Liberal Democrats	Fareed Alderechi	395	27.9	▲16.8
Green	Jacqueline Bond	256	18.1	▼2.1
Conservative	Lee Rotherham	160	11.3	▼4.3
Socialist (GB)	Daniel Lambert	9	0.6	N/A
Majority		200	14.1	
Turnout		1,415	22.5	▼4.1
Labour hold		Swing		

The by-election was caused by the death of Cllr Liam Jarnecki.

Knight's Hill by-election, 2 May 2024
Party	Candidate	Votes	%	±%
Labour	Emma Nye	2,677	55.5	▼6.8
Green	Victoria Evans	983	20.4	▲0.7
Conservative	Leila Yassen	530	11.0	▲1.5
Liberal Democrats	Nicholas Sanders	378	7.8	▲1.7
Independent	Janet Gayle	210	4.4	N/A
Majority		1,694		
Turnout		4,826	40.8	▲9.2
Labour hold		Swing		

This by-election was caused by the resignation of Cllr Sonia Winifred.

Streatham Common and Vale by-election, 2 May 2024
Party	Candidate	Votes	%	±%
Labour	Sarah Cole	2,269	49.3	▼9.1
Conservative	Promise Phillips	884	19.2	▲3.3
Green	Duncan Eastoe	784	17.1	▲3.9
Liberal Democrats	Nicholas Davidson	596	13.0	▲1.4
Majority		1,793		
Turnout		4,594	39.0	▲10.4
Labour hold		Swing		

This by-election was caused by the resignation of Cllr Tom Rutland, Labour's prospective parliamentary candidate for East Worthing and Shoreham at the 2024 general election.

Streatham Common and Vale by-election, 4 July 2024
Party	Candidate	Votes	%	±%
Labour	Dominic Armstrong	2,796	46.8	
Green	Duncan Eastoe	1,354	22.7	
Conservative	Lachlan Rurlander	918	15.4	
Liberal Democrats	Nicholas Davidson	906	15.2	
Majority		1,442	24.1	
Turnout		5,974		
Labour hold		Swing		

This by-election was caused by the resignation of Cllr Henna Shah.

Herne Hill and Loughborough Junction by-election, 1 May 2025
Party	Candidate	Votes	%	±%
Green	Paul Valentine	1,774	47.7	+9.8
Labour	Stephen Clark	1,459	39.2	−10.8
Conservative	Jago Brockway	183	4.9	−0.3
Reform	Lydia Aitcheson	135	3.6	+3.6
Liberal Democrats	Charley Hasted	121	3.3	−2.1
TUSC	Marco Tesei	30	0.8	−0.7
Socialist (GB)	Adam Buick	16	0.4	+0.4
Majority		315	8.5	
Turnout		3,718		
Green gain from Labour		Swing		

This by-election was caused by the resignation of Cllr Jim Dickson.

=== 2026-2030 ===
Clapham Park By-Election 9 July 2026
Party	Candidate	Votes	%	±%
Green	Michael Ball	842	43.8	
Labour	Louie Somerville-Sutherland	799	41.5	
Liberal Democrats	Ben Amos	108	5.6	
Conservative	Joshua Forrester	85	4.4	
Reform	Martin Read	71	3.7	
CPA	Susanna Jehwo	12	0.6	
Socialist (GB)	Anya Krycek	6	0.3	
Majority		43	2.2	
Turnout		1,923		
Green hold		Swing		

This by-election was caused by the resignation of Cllr Joanna Eaves.

Streatham St Leonard's By-Election 9 July 2026
Party	Candidate	Votes	%	±%
Liberal Democrats	Alex Davies	1,161	41.7	
Green	Dario Goodwin	972	35.0	
Labour	Jade Albas	421	15.1	
Conservative	Chris Cousins	119	4.3	
Reform	Mark McKee	71	2.6	
CPA	Yemi Awolola	37	1.3	
Majority		189	6.8	
Turnout		2,781		
Liberal Democrats gain from Green		Swing		

This by-election was caused by the resignation of Cllr Saiqa Ali.

Myatt's Fields By-Election 8 October 2026
Party	Candidate	Votes	%	±%
Labour	Molly Hartill	1,026	46.7	
Green	Sonia Winifred	815	37.1	
Liberal Democrats	Christopher French	189	8.6	
Conservative	John Hindson	74	3.4	
Reform	Mark McKee	58	2.6	
CPA	Yemi Awolola	26	1.2	
Socialist (GB)	Anya Krycek	9	0.4	
Majority		211	9.6	
Turnout		2,197		
Labour hold		Swing		

This by-election was caused by the death of Cllr Annie Gallop.

== Lambeth's recent political history ==
In 1979, the administration of Edward "Red Ted" Knight organised the borough's first public demonstration against the Thatcher government.

In 1985, the left-wing Labour administration of Knight was subjected to 'rate-capping', with its budget restricted by the Government. Knight and most of the Labour councillors protested by refusing to set any budget. This protest resulted in 32 councillors being ordered to repay to the council the interest the council had lost as a result of budgeting delays, and also being disqualified from office.

In 1991, Joan Twelves's administration both failed to collect the poll tax and openly opposed the war in the Persian Gulf. Twelves, and 12 other councillors were subsequently suspended from the labour party's local group by regional officials for advocating non-payment of the poll tax and other radical policies in 1992.

Twelves's equally militant deputy leader in this era was John Harrison.
