= Dulwich and West Norwood =

UK Parliament constituency (since 1997)

Coordinates: 51.447°N 0.084°W

- Borough constituency for the House of Commons
- Interactive map of boundaries from 2024
- Location within Greater London
- County: Greater London
- Electorate: 74,314 (March 2020)
- Major settlements: Herne Hill, Dulwich, Brixton, Gipsy Hill, West Norwood

Current constituency
- Created: 1997
- Member of Parliament: Helen Hayes (Labour)
- Seats: One
- Created from: Dulwich and Norwood

Dulwich and West Norwood (/ˈdʌlɪtʃ ... ˈnɔːwʊd/) is a constituency in South London created in 1997. It has been represented by Helen Hayes of Labour since her election in 2015.

In the 2016 EU referendum, Dulwich and West Norwood voted to remain in the European Union by an estimated 78%. This was the third highest proportion in the UK, behind Gibraltar and the neighbouring constituency of Vauxhall.

== Constituency profile ==
Dulwich and West Norwood is an urban and suburban constituency located in South London. It covers the neighbourhoods of Dulwich, West Norwood, Herne Hill and parts of Brixton. Like much of suburban London, the area grew rapidly in population during the late 19th century due to the arrival of rail transport. The constituency has average levels of deprivation, with more deprived areas around Brixton and wealthier areas in Dulwich. House prices are higher than the rest of London and more than double the national average.

In general, residents of the constituency are young, well-educated and less likely to own cars or homes. They have high levels of income and are more likely to work in professional occupations. The constituency is ethnically diverse; 2021 census data showed that White people made up 55% of the population, Black people were 25% and mixed race people were 9%. Brixton is particularly known for its Afro-Caribbean community; Black people make up nearly half the population in the area around Loughborough Junction. At the local council level, all wards covered by the constituency are represented by Labour Party councillors. In the 2016 Brexit referendum, voters in the constituency overwhelmingly supported remaining in the European Union; an estimated 79% voted to remain, the seventh-highest rate out of 650 constituencies nationwide according to Electoral Calculus.

Dulwich and West Norwood
- Interactive map of Dulwich and West Norwood

Racial makeup (2021)
  - White: 57.4%
  - Black: 23.3%
  - Mixed: 8.6%
  - Asian: 6.1%
  - Other: 4.6%

== Political history ==
The Labour Party has safe majorities of more than a 15% share of the vote since the seat was created in 1997. The runner-up party in four of the seven general elections to date has been the Conservative Party, the Liberal Democrats twice, and the Green Party twice.

When the constituency was created for the 1997 election, it was estimated that had the seat existed in 1992, Labour would have won it with a majority of less than 2,000 votes over the second placed Conservatives, making it a marginal seat. The 1997 result therefore suggested that the Conservative vote had halved since the previous election. This performance was poorer than the average fall of the Conservative vote in London and led the Almanac of British Politics to note that there was "now no question of this constituency being marginal."

== Boundaries ==
=== Historic ===
1997–2010: The London Borough of Southwark wards of Alleyn, Bellenden, College, Lyndhurst, Ruskin, and Rye, and the London Borough of Lambeth wards of Gipsy Hill, Herne Hill, Knight's Hill, and Thurlow Park.

2010–2024: The London Borough of Southwark wards of College, East Dulwich, and Village, and the London Borough of Lambeth wards of Coldharbour; Gipsy Hill; Herne Hill; Knight’s Hill; Thurlow Park.

Map of boundaries 2010–2024

=== Current ===
Further to the completion of the 2023 review of Westminster constituencies, which came into effect for the 2024 general election, the seat was subject to boundary changes which reflected revised ward names and boundaries in the borough of Southwark, with Dulwich Hill and Goose Green being included in the new constituency of Lewisham West and East Dulwich. In part compensation, the Champion Hill ward was transferred in from Camberwell and Peckham. No changes were made to the boundaries within the Borough of Lambeth.

Following these changes, as well as reflecting the 2022 local government review in Lambeth, the constituency now comprises the following:

- The London Borough of Southwark wards of Champion Hill, Dulwich Village, and Dulwich Wood; and
- The London Borough of Lambeth wards of Brixton North (part), Brixton Rush Common (small part), Brixton Windrush, Gipsy Hill, Herne Hill & Loughborough Junction, Knight's Hill, St Martin's (part), and West Dulwich (nearly all).

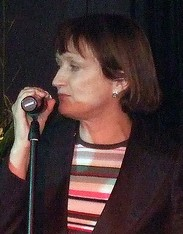
Tessa Jowell represented the constituency since its creation in 1997 up until she stepped down from office in 2015

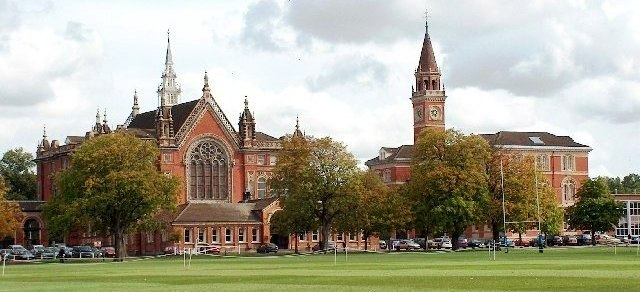
Dulwich College is a local landmark

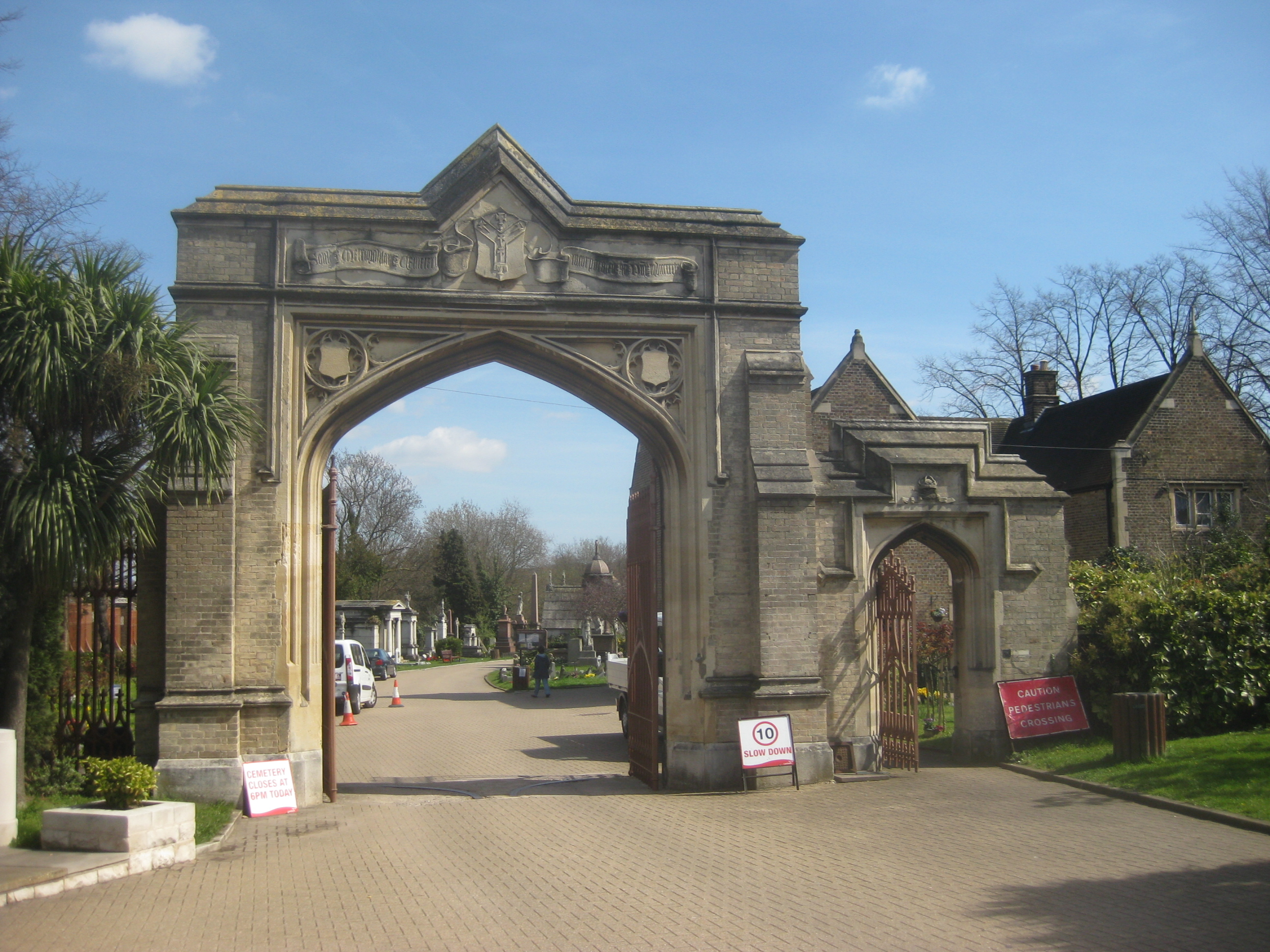
West Norwood Cemetery

== Members of Parliament ==
The constituency was created in 1997 from parts of the former seats of Dulwich and Norwood. It was represented from its creation until 2015 by the former Secretary of State for Culture (2001–2007), Tessa Jowell.

Election	Member	Party
1997	Tessa Jowell	Labour
2015	Helen Hayes	Labour

== Election results ==
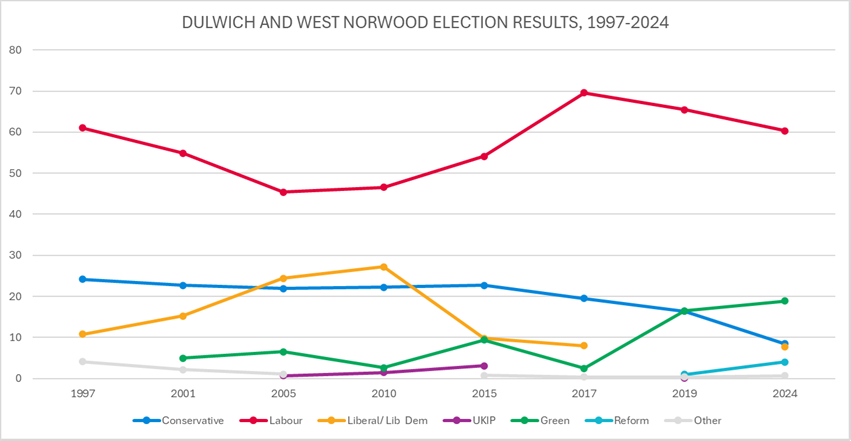
Election results 1997-2024

=== Elections in the 2020s ===
General election 2024: Dulwich and West Norwood
Party	Candidate	Votes	%	±%
Labour	Helen Hayes	27,356	60.3	▼4.2
Green	Pete Elliott	8,567	18.9	▲2.7
Conservative	Leon Cook	3,873	8.5	▼8.1
Liberal Democrats	Donna Harris	3,485	7.7	▲6.7
Reform	Gary Stevens	1,801	4.0	▲2.9
Independent	Mike Spenser	296	0.7	N/A
Majority		18,789	41.4	–6.4
Turnout		45,378	61.1	–9.1
Registered electors		74,265		
Labour hold		Swing	–3.5	

=== Elections in the 2010s ===
2019 notional result
Party	Vote	%
Labour	33,649	64.5
Conservative	8,686	16.6
Green	8,475	16.2
Brexit Party	566	1.1
Liberal Democrats	503	1.0
Others	315	0.6
Turnout	52,194	70.2
Electorate	74,314	

With a 14% increase in their vote share, this was the largest increase for any Green candidate at the 2019 General Election.

General election 2019: Dulwich and West Norwood
Party	Candidate	Votes	%	±%
Labour	Helen Hayes	36,521	65.5	−4.1
Green	Jonathan Bartley	9,211	16.5	+14.0
Conservative	Jane Lyons	9,160	16.4	−3.1
Brexit Party	Julia Stephenson	571	1.0	N/A
CPA	Anthony Hodgson	242	0.4	N/A
UKIP	John Plume	73	0.1	N/A
Majority		27,310	49.0	−1.1
Turnout		55,778	65.2	−6.7
Registered electors		84,663		
Labour hold		Swing	−9.1	

General election 2017: Dulwich and West Norwood
Party	Candidate	Votes	%	±%
Labour	Helen Hayes	39,096	69.6	+15.5
Conservative	Rachel Wolf	10,940	19.5	−3.2
Liberal Democrats	Gail Kent	4,475	8.0	−1.8
Green	Rashid Nix	1,408	2.5	−6.9
Independent	Robin Lambert	121	0.2	0.0
Independent	Yen Lin Chong	103	0.2	N/A
Majority		28,156	50.1	+18.7
Turnout		56,143	71.9	+4.8
Registered electors		78,037		
Labour hold		Swing	+9.4	

General election 2015: Dulwich and West Norwood
Party	Candidate	Votes	%	±%
Labour	Helen Hayes	27,772	54.1	+7.5
Conservative	Resham Kotecha	11,650	22.7	+0.5
Liberal Democrats	James Barber	5,055	9.8	−17.4
Green	Rashid Nix	4,844	9.4	+6.8
UKIP	Rathy Alagaratnam	1,606	3.1	+1.6
TUSC	Steve Nally	248	0.5	N/A
Independent	Robin Lambert	125	0.2	N/A
All People's Party	Amadu Kanumansa	62	0.1	N/A
Majority		16,122	31.4	+12.0
Turnout		51,362	67.1	+0.9
Registered electors		76,575		
Labour hold		Swing	+3.5	

General election 2010: Dulwich and West Norwood
Party	Candidate	Votes	%	±%
Labour	Tessa Jowell	22,461	46.6	+1.3
Liberal Democrats	Jonathan Mitchell	13,096	27.2	+4.3
Conservative	Kemi Adegoke	10,684	22.2	–2.1
Green	Shane Collins	1,266	2.6	−2.2
UKIP	Elizabeth Jones	707	1.5	+0.7
Majority		9,365	19.4	–1.6
Turnout		48,214	66.2	+9.9
Registered electors		72,817		
Labour hold		Swing	–1.5	

=== Elections of the 2000s ===
2005 notional result
Party	Vote	%
Labour	17,879	45.3
Conservative	9,588	24.3
Liberal Democrats	9,005	22.8
Green	1,901	4.8
Others	1,088	2.8
Turnout	39,461	56.3
Electorate	70,047	

General election 2005: Dulwich and West Norwood
Party	Candidate	Votes	%	±%
Labour	Tessa Jowell	19,059	45.4	−9.5
Liberal Democrats	Jonathan Mitchell	10,252	24.4	+9.2
Conservative	Kim Humphreys	9,200	21.9	−0.8
Green	Jenny Jones	2,741	6.5	+1.5
UKIP	Ralph Atkinson	290	0.7	N/A
Veritas	David Heather	241	0.6	N/A
Socialist Labour	Amanda Rose	149	0.4	N/A
For Integrity And Trust In Government	Judy Weleminsky	57	0.1	N/A
Majority		8,807	21.0	−11.2
Turnout		41,989	58.1	+4.7
Registered electors		73,710		
Labour hold		Swing	-9.4	

General election 2001: Dulwich and West Norwood
Party	Candidate	Votes	%	±%
Labour	Tessa Jowell	20,999	54.9	−6.1
Conservative	Nicholas Vineall	8,689	22.7	−1.5
Liberal Democrats	Caroline Pidgeon	5,805	15.2	+4.4
Green	Jenny Jones	1,914	5.0	N/A
Socialist Alliance	Brian Kelly	839	2.2	N/A
Majority		12,310	32.2	−4.6
Turnout		38,246	53.4	−12.1
Registered electors		71,261		
Labour hold		Swing	–2.3	

=== Elections of the 1990s ===
General election 1997: Dulwich and West Norwood
Party	Candidate	Votes	%	±%
Labour	Tessa Jowell	27,807	61.0	+14.6
Conservative	Roger Gough	11,038	24.2	–18.6
Liberal Democrats	Susan Kramer	4,916	10.8	+1.0
Referendum	Bruce Coles	897	2.0	N/A
Liberal	Alex Goldie	587	1.3	N/A
Rainbow Dream Ticket	David Goodman	173	0.4	N/A
UKIP	Eddie Pike	159	0.3	N/A
Rizz Party	Captain Rizz	38	0.1	N/A
Majority		16,769	36.8	+33.2
Turnout		45,615	65.5	–2.7
Registered electors		70,203		
Labour win (new seat)				

1992 notional result
Party	Vote	%
Labour	23,582	46.3
Conservative	21,779	42.8
Liberal Democrats	4,998	9.8
Others	531	1.0
Turnout	50,890	67.7
Electorate	75,179	

== See also ==
- List of parliamentary constituencies in London
- Lambeth local elections
- Southwark local elections
