= Gipsy Hill (ward) =

Coordinates: 51.427°N 0.092°W

- Electoral ward for the Lambeth London Borough Council
- Gipsy Hill ward boundaries since 2022
- Borough: Lambeth
- County: Greater London
- Population: 10,730 (2021) (Note: 2021 Census data reported for 2022 ward boundaries)
- Electorate: 7,830 (2022)
- Area: 0.9654 square kilometres (0.3727 sq mi)

Current electoral ward
- Created: 1978
- Members: 2 (2022-present); 3 (1978–2022)
- GSS code: E05014103 (2022–present)

Gipsy Hill is an electoral ward in the London Borough of Lambeth, England. The ward has existed since 1978 and was first used in the 1978 elections. Since 2022 it has returned two councillors to Lambeth London Borough Council and from 1978 to 2022 returned three councillors.

== List of councillors ==
Term	Councillor	Party
1978–1982	Leonard Hammond	Labour
1978–1982	Michael Jeram	Labour
1978–1982	Yvonne Phipp	Labour
1982–1990	Anthony Green	Conservative
1982–1986	Stewart Cowell	Conservative
1982–1986	Richard Timmis	Conservative
1986–1994	Stewart Hunter	Labour
1986–1994	George Huish	Labour
1990–1994	Rachael Webb	Labour
1994–2006	Janet Grigg	Conservative
1994–1998	David Green	Conservative
1994–1998	Charlie Elphicke	Conservative
1998–2006	Russell A'Court	Conservative
1998–2006	Gareth Compton	Conservative
2006–2010	Suzanne Poole	Conservative
2006–2010	Andrew Gibson	Conservative
2006–2010	Graham Pycock	Conservative
2010–2016	Niranjan Francis	Labour
2010–2022	Matthew Bennett	Labour
2010–2022	Jennifer Brathwaite	Labour
2016–2018	Luke Murphy	Labour
2018–2022	Pete Elliott	Green
2022–present	Christine Banton	Labour
2022–present	Rebecca Spencer	Labour

== Lambeth council elections since 2022 ==
There was a revision of ward boundaries in Lambeth in 2022.

=== 2022 election ===
The election took place on 5 May 2022.

2022 Lambeth London Borough Council election: Gipsy Hill (2)
Party	Candidate	Votes	%	±%
Labour	Christine Banton	1,457	51.0	
Labour	Rebecca Spencer	1,326	46.4	
Green	Pete Elliott	1,271	44.5	
Green	Shamin Nakalembe	1,170	40.9	
Conservative	James Davis	198	6.9	
Conservative	Adrian Stones	144	5.0	
Liberal Democrats	Sarah Dobson	101	3.5	
Liberal Democrats	Michael Tuffrey	50	1.7	
Turnout		2,919	37.3	
Labour win (new boundaries)				
Labour win (new boundaries)				

== 2002–2022 Lambeth council elections ==
Gipsy Hill ward boundaries from 2002 to 2022

There was a revision of ward boundaries in Lambeth in 2002.

=== 2018 election ===
The election took place on 3 May 2018.

2018 Lambeth London Borough Council election: Gipsy Hill (3)
Party	Candidate	Votes	%	±%
Labour	Jennifer Braithwaite	2,063	16.5	
Labour	Matthew Bennett	2,054	16.4	
Green	Pete Elliott	1,922	15.3	
Green	Becki Newell	1,903	15.2	
Labour	Luke Murphy	1,778	14.2	
Green	Paul Rocks	1,647	13.1	
Conservative	James Davis	271	2.2	
Conservative	Irene Kimm	229	1.8	
Conservative	Simon Hooberman	208	1.7	
Liberal Democrats	Alexander Davies	132	1.1	
Liberal Democrats	Samar Riaz	124	1.0	
Liberal Democrats	Alexander Haylett	101	0.8	
UKIP	John Dodds	42	0.3	
UKIP	David Kennett	36	0.3	
UKIP	Dafydd Morris	31	0.2	
Turnout				
Labour hold		Swing		
Labour hold		Swing		
Green gain from Labour		Swing		

=== 2016 by-election ===
A by-election took place on 9 June 2016.

2016 Gipsy Hill by-election
Party	Candidate	Votes	%	±%
Labour	Luke Murphy	1,220		
Green	Peter Elliott	1,184		
Conservative	Leslie Maruziva	210		
Liberal Democrats	Rosa Jesse	84		
UKIP	Elizabeth Jones	73		
Independent	Robin Lambert	24		
TUSC	Steven Nally	19		
Majority		36	1.3	
Turnout				
Labour hold		Swing		

=== 2014 election ===
The election took place on 22 May 2014.

2014 Lambeth London Borough Council election: Gipsy Hill (3)
Party	Candidate	Votes	%	±%
Labour	Matthew Bennett	2,242		
Labour	Niranjan Francis	2,202		
Labour	Jennifer Braithwaite	2,183		
Conservative	Tom Martin	436		
Conservative	Ali Kayikkiran	434		
Conservative	Said Gutin	423		
Green	Ben McKeown	364		
Green	Cath Potter	317		
Green	Paul Wynter	257		
Liberal Democrats	David Hare	164		
Liberal Democrats	Marietta Crichton Stuart	161		
UKIP	Eddie Otoyo	142		
Liberal Democrats	Marcus van Breugel	133		
Total votes		9,458		
Labour hold		Swing		
Labour hold		Swing		
Labour hold		Swing		

=== 2010 election ===
The election on 6 May 2010 took place on the same day as the United Kingdom general election.

2010 Lambeth London Borough Council election: Gipsy Hill (3)
Party	Candidate	Votes	%	±%
Labour	Matthew Bennett	2,670		
Labour	Niranjan Francis	2,597		
Labour	Jennifer Brathwaite	2,588		
Conservative	Andrew Gibson	1,954		
Conservative	Suzanne Poole	1,611		
Conservative	Carl Belgrove	1,585		
Liberal Democrats	Yvonne aan de Wiel	1,055		
Liberal Democrats	Wendy Horler	1,016		
Liberal Democrats	Danielle Lowson	852		
Green	David Sinclair	462		
Green	Geoff Dennis	347		
Green	Anthony Shuster	332		
Total votes		16,769		
Labour gain from Conservative		Swing		
Labour gain from Conservative		Swing		
Labour gain from Conservative		Swing		

=== 2006 election ===
The election took place on 4 May 2006.

2006 Lambeth London Borough Council election: Gipsy Hill (3)
Party	Candidate	Votes	%	±%
Conservative	Suzanne Poole	1,402		
Conservative	Andrew Gibson	1,352		
Conservative	Graham Pycock	1,283		
Labour	Carol Boucher	915		
Labour	Daniel Lawuyi	838		
Labour	Bill Watling	790		
Green	Graham Jones	631		
Liberal Democrats	Vivienne Baines	521		
Liberal Democrats	Philip Shoesmith	408		
Liberal Democrats	Clive Parry	368		
Total votes		8,508		
Conservative hold		Swing		
Conservative hold		Swing		
Conservative hold		Swing		

=== 2002 election ===
The election took place on 2 May 2002.

2002 Lambeth London Borough Council election: Gipsy Hill (3)
Party	Candidate	Votes	%	±%
Conservative	Janet Grigg	1,579		
Conservative	Russell A'Court	1,571		
Conservative	Gareth Compton	1,509		
Labour	David Green	1,034		
Labour	Marcia Cameron	1,001		
Labour	John Muir	899		
Green	Jessica Cahill	251		
Liberal Democrats	David Boyle	237		
Green	David Goodman	182		
Liberal Democrats	Peta Cubberley	180		
Green	Kathleen Manuell	178		
Liberal Democrats	Joel Robinson	165		
Turnout		8,786	32.3	
Conservative win (new boundaries)				
Conservative win (new boundaries)				
Conservative win (new boundaries)				

== 1978–2002 Lambeth council elections ==
Gipsy Hill ward boundaries from 1978 to 2002

=== 1998 election ===
The election took place on 7 May 1998.

=== 1994 election ===
The election took place on 5 May 1994.

=== 1990 election ===
The election took place on 3 May 1990.

=== 1986 election ===
The election took place on 8 May 1986.

=== 1982 election ===
The election took place on 6 May 1982.

=== 1978 election ===
The election took place on 4 May 1978.
