= Bishop's (ward) =

Coordinates: 51.500°N 0.114°W

- Former electoral ward for the Lambeth London Borough Council
- Bishop's ward boundaries from 2002 to 2022
- Borough: Lambeth
- County: Greater London

Former electoral ward
- Created: 1965
- Abolished: 2022
- Member(s): 3
- Replaced by: Kennington; Waterloo and South Bank
- GSS code: E05000416

Bishop's ward was an administrative division of the London Borough of Lambeth, United Kingdom, from 1965 to 2022

It was located in the north of the borough, bounded by the river Thames, and contained many well known London sites including the Southbank Centre, the London Eye, the Old and New Vic theatres, County Hall and Lambeth Palace. It also contained Waterloo station and St Thomas Hospital.

Bishop's ward was located in the Vauxhall parliamentary constituency and is one of four wards in the borough's north Lambeth division.

The Lambeth Council State of the Borough 2014 report found that Bishop's was the least residential ward of the borough. It had the lowest ward population (10,600), with a low proportion of children – over 80% of residents are working age, with many born outside UK. It has the highest number of jobs and the highest employment per head of resident working age population. Health outcomes, such as life expectancy and childhood obesity are typical of the borough. It had the highest proportion of Asian residents in the borough.

Although the riverside areas are affluent, household income in most of the rest of the ward was comparable with the borough as a whole. Housing tenure was similar to the borough as a whole – 21% home owners, 42% Social rented, 34% private rented. It had the highest proportion of flats, and house prices are high - 30% of dwellings are in the higher council tax (property tax) bands F, G or H. Bishop͛s had the highest ward crime rate figures as of 2013, especially violence against the person and theft and handling – this is associated with large numbers of people in the ward at Waterloo station and the South Bank.

== 2002–2022 Lambeth council elections ==
There was a revision of ward boundaries in Lambeth in 2002.

=== 2018 election ===
2018 Lambeth London Borough Council election: Bishop's (3)
Party	Candidate	Votes	%	±%
Labour	Jen Moseley	1,126	15.8	+9.2
Labour	Kevin Craig	1,094	15.4	
Labour	Ibrahim Dogus	1,090	15.3	
Liberal Democrats	Audrey Eager	713	10.0	−3.8
Liberal Democrats	Adrian Hyyrylainen-Trett	691	9.7	
Liberal Democrats	Charley Hasted	606	8.5	
Conservative	James Bellis	311	4.4	+1.9
Green	Michael Armstrong	292	4.1	+0.1
Conservative	Glyn Chambers	286	4.0	
Green	James Wallace	253	3.6	
Conservative	Peter Wilde	243	3.4	
Green	Gay Lee	189	2.7	
UKIP	Elizabeth Jones	86	1.2	−5.2
UKIP	Gavin Gibbs	72	1.0	
UKIP	David Poulden	69	1.0	
Labour hold		Swing		
Labour hold		Swing		
Labour hold		Swing		

=== 2014 election ===
2014 Lambeth London Borough Council election: Bishop's (3)
Party	Candidate	Votes	%	±%
Labour	Jennifer Moseley	1,106	37.3	
Labour	Kevin Craig	1,061		
Labour	Ben Kind	975		
Liberal Democrats	Diana Braithwaite	949	32.0	
Liberal Democrats	Peter Truesdale	939		
Liberal Democrats	Mathew Hanney	777		
Green	Sam Brightbart	304	10.3	
Green	Clive Croft	295		
Conservative	David Frost	292	9.9	
Conservative	Edward Harrison	291		
Conservative	Lee Rotherham	284		
Green	Bart Gorissen	272		
UKIP	Andrew Hayes	248	8.4	
TUSC	El Morris	63	2.1	
Total votes		7,857	72.1	
Labour gain from Liberal Democrats		Swing		
Labour gain from Liberal Democrats		Swing		
Labour gain from Liberal Democrats		Swing		

=== 2010 election ===
2010 Lambeth London Borough Council election: Bishop's (3)
Party	Candidate	Votes	%	±%
Liberal Democrats	Diana Braithwaite	1,676		
Liberal Democrats	Peter Truesdale	1,641		
Liberal Democrats	Gavin Dodsworth	1,483		
Labour	Jennifer Moseley	1,307		
Labour	Kevin Craig	1,256		
Labour	Rodney Reid	1,067		
Conservative	Edward Blain	751		
Conservative	Edward Jones	667		
Conservative	Rickard Jonsson	649		
Green	Colin Kavanagh	339		
Green	James Wallace	288		
Green	Jonathan Stone-Fewings	197		
Total votes		11,321		
Liberal Democrats hold		Swing		
Liberal Democrats hold		Swing		
Liberal Democrats hold		Swing		

=== 2006 election ===
2006 Lambeth London Borough Council election: Bishop's (3)
Party	Candidate	Votes	%	±%
Liberal Democrats	Peter Truesdale	1,090		
Liberal Democrats	Diana Braithwaite	1,020		
Liberal Democrats	Gavin Dodsworth	869		
Labour	Richard Bridge	485		
Labour	Rodney Reid	427		
Labour	Kevin Craig	399		
Green	James Wallace	381		
Conservative	Carl Gibson	289		
Conservative	Jeremy Fox	285		
Local Education Action by Parents	Christine Holt	249		
Conservative	Gareth Streeter	236		
Total votes		5,730		
Liberal Democrats hold		Swing		
Liberal Democrats hold		Swing		
Liberal Democrats hold		Swing		

=== 2002 election ===
2002 Lambeth London Borough Council election: Bishop's (3)
Party	Candidate	Votes	%	±%
Liberal Democrats	Peter Truesdale	1,123		
Liberal Democrats	Charlotte Parry	1,039		
Liberal Democrats	Clive Parry	994		
Labour	Lorna Campbell	622		
Labour	Madge McGhie	506		
Labour	Lee Seaman	488		
Green	Simon Williams	166		
Conservative	Audrey Blaine	125		
Conservative	Caroline King	121		
Conservative	Judith Pattman	106		
Socialist Alliance	Veronica Planton	80		
Turnout		5,370	27.3	
Liberal Democrats hold		Swing		
Liberal Democrats gain from Labour		Swing		
Liberal Democrats gain from Labour		Swing		

== 1978–2002 Lambeth council elections ==
There was a revision of ward boundaries in Lambeth in 1978.

== 1964–1978 Lambeth council elections ==
=== 1964 election ===
1964 Lambeth London Borough Council election: Bishop's
Party	Candidate	Votes	%	±%
Labour	G. Light	1,393	74.6	
Labour	A. Dennis	1,391		
Labour	G. Jacques	1,391		
Conservative	D. Brocklebank	474	25.4	
Conservative	D. Stephens	472		
Conservative	D. Bonass	451		
Turnout		1,872	18.5	
Registered electors		10,141		
Labour win (new seat)				
Labour win (new seat)				
Labour win (new seat)				
