= Neeraj Patil =

British politician

Neeraj Patil ಡಾ. ನೀರಜ್ ಪಾಟೀಲ್

Mayor of the London Borough of Lambeth
- In office 26 May 2010 – 30 March 2011
- Preceded by: Christopher Wellbelove
- Succeeded by: Christina Valcarcel

Personal details
- Born: Gulbarga, Karnataka, India
- Children: 2
- Education: M. R. Medical College; FRCS, Royal College of Surgeons of Edinburgh
- Occupation: Doctor
- Awards: Karnataka Rajyotsava Award; Aryabhata Award

Neeraj Patil (Kannada: ಡಾ. ನೀರಜ್ ಪಾಟೀಲ್) is a British doctor and Labour Party politician who served as Mayor of the London Borough of Lambeth from 2010 to 2011. He was the borough's first mayor of Asian origin.

== Career ==
Patil is from the Indian state of Karnataka. In 2008, he was awarded the "Rajyotsava Award" by the Government of Karnataka for promoting Accountable Democracy in India.

Patil completed his fellowship at the Royal College of Surgeons of Edinburgh. He served as a Consultant in Emergency Medicine at Worthing Hospital and was part of the KWASH campaign to save its Emergency service. He was first elected as a Councillor for the Larkhall ward in 2006.

During his term as Mayor of Lambeth, he received Pope Benedict XVI during his official visit to London on 18 September 2010, and oversaw the erection of a statue of the 12th century Indian philosopher Lord Basavanna at the Albert Embankment Gardens.

In 2017, Patil campaigned to become MP for the constituency of Putney, becoming the first Kannadiga individual to run for the House of Commons. He lost to Education Secretary Justine Greening by 1,554 votes, achieving a swing of 10.2% in favour of the Labour Party.

In 2018 Patil complained to the House of Commons authorities about improper use of parliamentary facilities by Labour MP Virendra Sharma. His complaint was upheld although the House authorities did not consider it necessary to impose any penalty on Sharma.

In August 2022, he unsuccessfully applied to contest Bassetlaw in Nottinghamshire as the Labour Party candidate at the 2024 United Kingdom general election.

== Political functions ==
- Mayor of the London Borough of Lambeth (2010–2011)
- Lambeth Councillor for Larkhall (2006, 2010)
- Governor of Kings College Hospital (2006–2007)
- Governor of St Thomas Hospital (2008–2010)
- Member of the National Policy Forum, Labour Party (2013–2015)
- Member of National Executive BAME Labour (2009–2013)
- Member of NRI Forum Karnataka (2007–2010).
