= 2006 Lambeth London Borough Council election =

2006 Lambeth Council election
← 2002	4 May 2006	2010 →

All 63 council seats
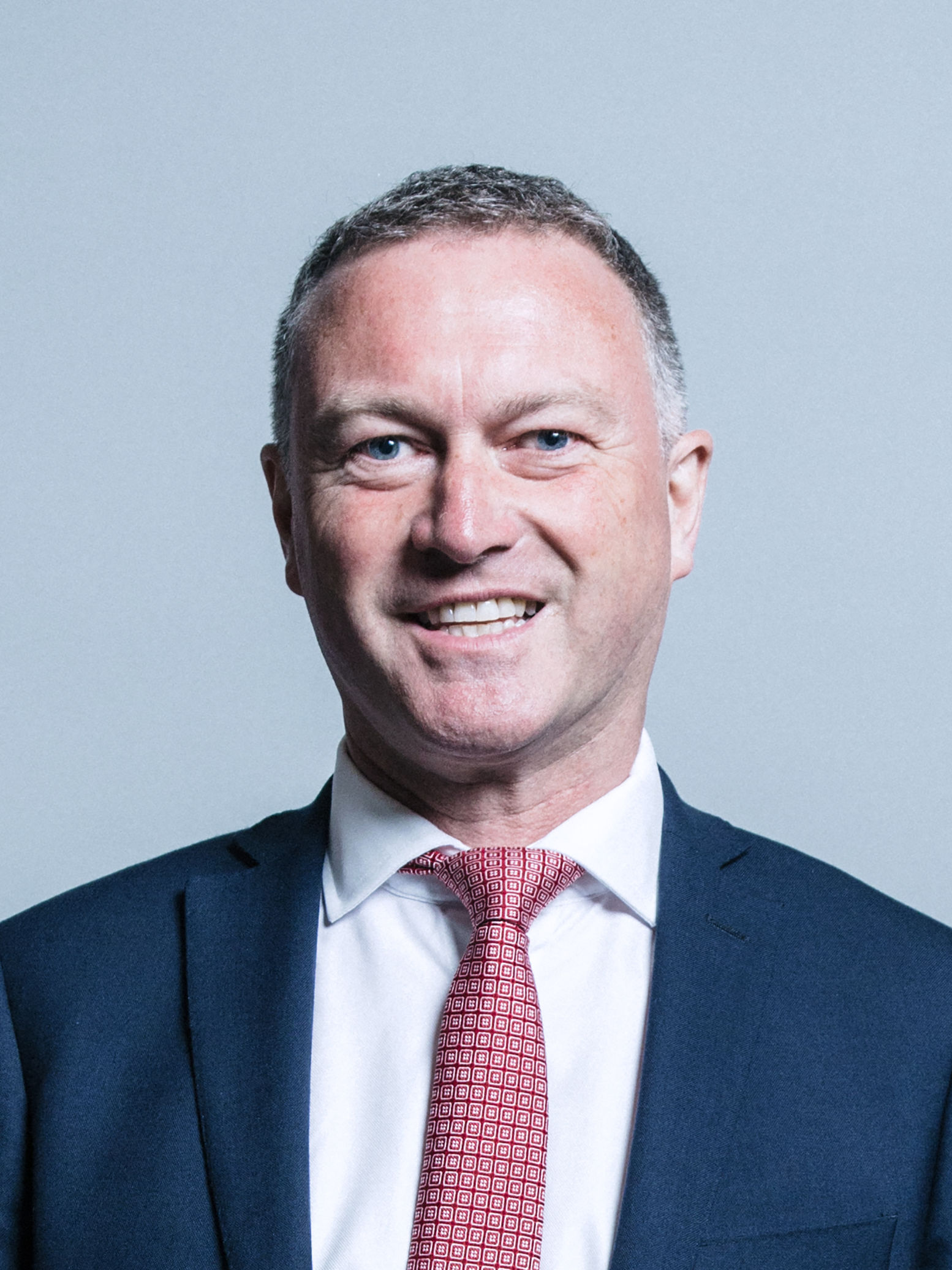

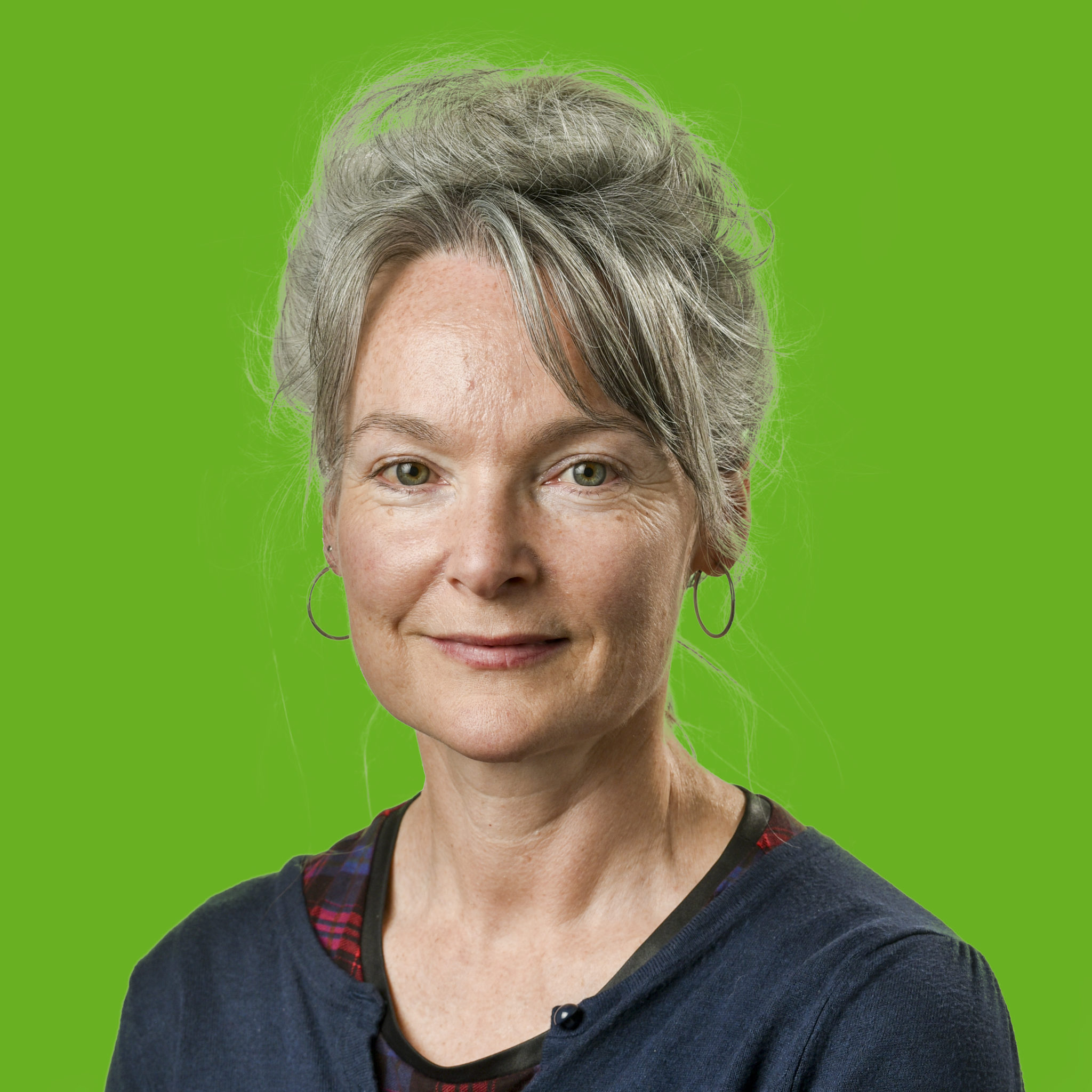
	First party	Second party
		Lib
Leader	Steve Reed	Peter Truesdale
Party	Labour	Liberal Democrats
Leader since	September 2002	1998
Leader's seat	Brixton Hill	Bishop's
Last election	28 seats, 36.6%	28 seats, 33.3%
Seats won	39	17
Seat change	▲11	▼11
Popular vote	25,068	19,207
Percentage	35.4%	27.1%
Swing	▼1.2%	▼6.2%
	Third party	Fourth party
	Con
Leader	John Whelan	Becca Thackray
Party	Conservative	Green
Leader since	1998	4 May 2006
Leader's seat	Thurlow Park	Herne Hill
Last election	7 seats, 16.2%	0 seats, 11.5%
Seats won	6	1
Seat change	▼1	▲1
Popular vote	12,271	11,311
Percentage	17.3%	16.0%
Swing	▲1.1%	▲4.5%
- Map of the results of the 2006 Lambeth council election. Conservatives in blue, Greens in green, Labour in red and Liberal Democrats in yellow.
Leader of Largest Party before election
Peter Truesdale
Liberal Democrats
Subsequent Leader of Largest Party
Steve Reed
Labour

Elections to Lambeth London Borough Council were held on 4 May 2006. The whole council was up for election with no boundary changes since the last election in 2002. The Labour Party gained control of the council, replacing the Liberal Democrat and Conservative coalition that had run the council since the previous election.

The election was notable for the Labour Party managing to win control of the borough despite a marginal fall in its overall percentage share of the vote. Labour taking Lambeth was also against the trend of the 2006 local election body elections which saw Labour lose control of 18 councils with a loss of 319 councillors.

Also significant was the election of Lambeth's first Green Party councillor, one of many gains for the Party across London. The Green Party took 16% of the vote across the borough.

== Election result ==
Lambeth Local Election Result 2006
Party	Seats	Gains	Losses	Net gain/loss	Seats %	Votes %	Votes	+/−
Labour	39	12	1	+11	61.9	35.4	25,068	-1.2
Liberal Democrats	17	0	11	-11	27.0	27.1	19,207	-6.2
Conservative	6	0	1	-1	9.5	17.3	12,271	+1.1
Green	1	1	0	+1	1.6	16.0	11,311	+4.5
Local Education Action by Parents	0	0	0	0	0.0	2.7	1,908	New
Independent	0	0	0	0	0.0	0.8	1,055	+0.7
Respect	0	0	0	0	0.0	0.4	287	New
UKIP	0	0	0	0	0.0	0.2	112	+0.1
English Democrat	0	0	0	0	0.0	0.2	108	New
Socialist (GB)	0	0	0	0	0.0	0.1	62	New

== Ward results ==
* – Existing Councillor seeking re-election.

=== Bishop's ===
Bishop's (3)
Party	Candidate	Votes	%	±%
Liberal Democrats	Peter Truesdale *	1,090	43.7	
Liberal Democrats	Diana Braithwaite	1,020		
Liberal Democrats	Gavin Dodsworth	869		
Labour	Richard Bridge	485	19.4	
Labour	Rodney Reid	427		
Labour	Kevin Craig	399		
Green	James Wallace	381	15.3	
Conservative	Carl Gibson	289	11.6	
Conservative	Jeremy Fox	285		
Local Education Action by Parents	Christine Holt	249	10.0	
Conservative	Gareth Streeter	236		
Total votes		5,730		
Liberal Democrats hold		Swing		
Liberal Democrats hold		Swing		
Liberal Democrats hold		Swing		

=== Brixton Hill ===
Brixton Hill (3)
Party	Candidate	Votes	%	±%
Labour	Steve Reed *	1,354	45.3	
Labour	Betty Evans-Jacas	1,213		
Labour	Florence Nosegbe	1,206		
Green	Roger Baker	714	23.9	
Green	Thomas Law	596		
Green	Amrit Chanion	559		
Liberal Democrats	Elsie Binder	534	17.9	
Liberal Democrats	Duncan Brack	469		
Liberal Democrats	Alexander Davies	406		
Conservative	Penelope Sinclair	389	13.0	
Conservative	John Taylor	351		
Conservative	Barbara Windbourne	329		
Total votes		8,120		
Labour hold		Swing		
Labour hold		Swing		
Labour hold		Swing		

=== Clapham Common ===
Clapham Common (3)
Party	Candidate	Votes	%	±%
Labour	Ruth Ling *	990	30.3	
Liberal Democrats	Darren Sanders *	964	29.5	
Liberal Democrats	Angela Meander *	914		
Liberal Democrats	Heather Sherratt	880		
Conservative	Steven Jones	872	26.7	
Conservative	Lloyd Milton	846		
Conservative	Alistair Hamilton	840		
Labour	David Walker	826		
Labour	Brian Witington	800		
Green	Timothy Beaumont	438	13.4	
Green	Zana Dean	370		
Total votes		8,740		
Labour hold		Swing		
Liberal Democrats hold		Swing		
Liberal Democrats hold		Swing		

=== Clapham Town ===
Clapham Town (3)
Party	Candidate	Votes	%	±%
Labour	Helen O'Malley *	1,535	39.9	
Labour	Nigel Haselden	1,417		
Labour	Christopher Wellbelove	1,293		
Conservative	Bernard Gentry *	1,230	32.0	
Conservative	Glyn Chambers	1,121		
Conservative	Kelly Maimon	1,121		
Green	Albere Hanna	534	13.9	
Liberal Democrats	Gloria Gomez	484	12.6	
Liberal Democrats	Roger Stewart	379		
Liberal Democrats	Thomas Snagge	308		
Socialist (GB)	Daniel Lambert	62	1.6	
Socialist (GB)	James Martin	39		
Socialist (GB)	John Lee	38		
Total votes		9,561		
Labour hold		Swing		
Labour hold		Swing		
Labour gain from Conservative		Swing		

=== Coldharbour ===
Coldharbour (3)
Party	Candidate	Votes	%	±%
Labour	Donatus Anyanwu *	1,299	55.5	
Labour	Rachel Heywood	1,272		
Labour	Sharon Malley	1,187		
Green	Elkin Atwell	486	20.8	
Green	Rachel Braverman	471		
Green	Timothy Summers	400		
Liberal Democrats	Robert Blackie	304	13.0	
Liberal Democrats	Sandra Lawman	279		
Conservative	Simon Barrie	250	10.7	
Conservative	Smarajit Roy	242		
Conservative	Marcus Booth	222		
Liberal Democrats	Geoffrey Bowring	216		
Total votes		6,628		
Labour hold		Swing		
Labour hold		Swing		
Labour hold		Swing		

=== Ferndale ===
Ferndale (3)
Party	Candidate	Votes	%	±%
Labour	Paul McGlone *	1,332	47.9	
Labour	Sally Prentice *	1,282		
Labour	Neil Sabharwal	1,205		
Liberal Democrats	Lena Smith	572	20.6	
Liberal Democrats	Mirza Basic	559		
Liberal Democrats	Marcus Mayers	535		
Green	Philip Georgiou	507	18.2	
Conservative	Helen Gentry	371	13.3	
Conservative	David Farley	343		
Conservative	Rosemary Morales	331		
Total votes		7,037		
Labour hold		Swing		
Labour hold		Swing		
Labour hold		Swing		

=== Gipsy Hill ===
Gipsy Hill (3)
Party	Candidate	Votes	%	±%
Conservative	Suzanne Poole	1,402	40.4	
Conservative	Andrew Gibson	1,352		
Conservative	Graham Pycock	1,283		
Labour	Carol Boucher	915	26.4	
Labour	Daniel Lawuyi	838		
Labour	Bill Watling	790		
Green	Graham Jones	631	18.2	
Liberal Democrats	Vivienne Baines	521	15.0	
Liberal Democrats	Philip Shoesmith	408		
Liberal Democrats	Clive Parry	368		
Total votes		8,508		
Conservative hold		Swing		
Conservative hold		Swing		
Conservative hold		Swing		

=== Herne Hill ===
Herne Hill (3)
Party	Candidate	Votes	%	±%
Green	Becca Thackray	1,359	37.3	
Labour	Kirsty McHugh *	1,343	36.9	
Labour	Jim Dickson *	1,314		
Green	Shane Collins	1,298		
Labour	Peter O'Connell *	1,205		
Green	George Graham	1,151		
Conservative	Timothy Ayres	571	15.7	
Conservative	Charles Holroyd	562		
Conservative	Jessica Lee	497		
Liberal Democrats	Malgorzata Baker	371	10.2	
Liberal Democrats	Malcolm Baines	353		
Liberal Democrats	Charlotte Parry	341		
Total votes		10,365		
Green gain from Labour		Swing		
Labour hold		Swing		
Labour hold		Swing		

=== Knight's Hill ===
Knight's Hill (3)
Party	Candidate	Votes	%	±%
Labour	Jackie Meldrum	1,358	37.9	
Labour	David Malone	1,352		
Labour	Daniel Fitzpatrick	1,349		
Liberal Democrats	Geraldine Evans *	1,273	35.6	
Liberal Democrats	Jeremy Baker *	1,218		
Liberal Democrats	Saleha Jaffer	1,116		
Green	Joseph Healy	514	14.4	
Conservative	Nicholas van der Borgh	435	12.2	
Conservative	Sheila Calder	426		
Conservative	Jane Hill	417		
Total votes		9,458		
Labour gain from Liberal Democrats		Swing		
Labour gain from Liberal Democrats		Swing		
Labour gain from Liberal Democrats		Swing		

=== Larkhall ===
Larkhall (3)
Party	Candidate	Votes	%	±%
Labour	Peter Robbins	1,341	49.0	
Labour	Christiana Valcarcel	1,279		
Labour	Neeraj Patil	1,263		
Liberal Democrats	Roy Jenkins	476	17.4	
Conservative	Nicholas Maud	463	16.9	
Liberal Democrats	Laura Morland	459		
Liberal Democrats	Christopher Whitehouse	459		
Green	Helen Fensterheim	458	16.7	
Conservative	Charles Pender	440		
Conservative	William Trelawny	415		
Green	Noah Rutter	346		
Total votes		7,399		
Labour hold		Swing		
Labour hold		Swing		
Labour hold		Swing		

=== Oval ===
Oval (3)
Party	Candidate	Votes	%	±%
Liberal Democrats	Robert Banks	1,193	37.1	
Liberal Democrats	Faye Gray	1,044		
Liberal Democrats	Andrew Sawdon *	1,027		
Labour	Andy Harrop	841	26.1	
Labour	Luke Herbert	792		
Labour	David Pritchard-Jones	697		
Green	Carlos Coke	471	14.6	
Conservative	Magnus Goodland	423	13.1	
Conservative	David Haigh	364		
Conservative	Sunil Tailor	340		
Green	Peter Krakowiak	323		
Local Education Action by Parents	Ruby Millington	183	5.7	
English Democrat	Janus Polenceus	108	3.4	
Total votes		7,806		
Liberal Democrats hold		Swing		
Liberal Democrats hold		Swing		
Liberal Democrats hold		Swing		

=== Prince's ===
Prince's (3)
Party	Candidate	Votes	%	±%
Labour	Lorna Campbell	1,586	43.0	
Labour	Samuel Townend	1,575		
Labour	Stephen Morgan	1,546		
Liberal Democrats	Rita Fitzgerald	901	24.4	
Liberal Democrats	Keith Fitchett *	827		
Liberal Democrats	Charles Anglin *	676		
Conservative	Liam Campbell	556	15.1	
Conservative	Richard Hyslop	505		
Green	Paul Steedman	495	13.4	
Conservative	Nicholas Gibbon	476		
Local Education Action by Parents	Eugenia Rattigan	153	4.1	
Local Education Action by Parents	Andrew Amos	137		
Total votes		9,433		
Labour gain from Liberal Democrats		Swing		
Labour gain from Liberal Democrats		Swing		
Labour gain from Liberal Democrats		Swing		

=== St Leonard's ===
St Leonard's (3)
Party	Candidate	Votes	%	±%
Liberal Democrats	Clive Bennett *	1,454	41.8	
Liberal Democrats	Brian Palmer *	1,373		
Liberal Democrats	Roger Giess *	1,187		
Labour	Robert Hill	615	17.7	
Labour	Catherine Harvey	604		
Green	Rebecca Findlay	564	16.2	
Labour	Richard Payne	502		
Conservative	Wendy Newall	435	12.5	
Conservative	John Bellak	420		
Local Education Action by Parents	Michelle Singleton	409	11.8	
Conservative	Stephen McMenamin	398		
Total votes		7,961		
Liberal Democrats hold		Swing		
Liberal Democrats hold		Swing		
Liberal Democrats hold		Swing		

=== Stockwell ===
Stockwell (3)
Party	Candidate	Votes	%	±%
Labour	Peter Bowyer *	1,565	39.3	
Labour	Pav Akhtar	1,552		
Labour	Imogen Walker	1,513		
Liberal Democrats	Anthony Bottrall *	1,321	33.1	
Liberal Democrats	Polly Mackenzie	1,012		
Liberal Democrats	David Hayes	1,010		
Green	Thomas Tibbits	443	11.1	
Conservative	Sarah Barr	416	10.4	
Conservative	Elizabeth Gibson	365		
Conservative	Robert McMillan	331		
Local Education Action by Parents	Tracey Fevrier	241	6.0	
Total votes		9,769		
Labour gain from Liberal Democrats		Swing		
Labour gain from Liberal Democrats		Swing		
Labour gain from Liberal Democrats		Swing		

=== Streatham Hill ===
Streatham Hill (3)
Party	Candidate	Votes	%	±%
Liberal Democrats	June Fewtrell *	1,367	34.2	
Liberal Democrats	Jeremy Clyne *	1,248		
Liberal Democrats	Ashley Lumsden *	1,183		
Labour	Brian Cowie	781	19.5	
Labour	Alex Ekumah	739		
Labour	Nancy Platts	717		
Green	David Ince	573	14.3	
Independent	Nazim Ali	540	13.5	
Independent	Christopher Baron	515		
Conservative	Peter Younghusband	411	10.3	
Conservative	Susan Smith	389		
Conservative	Titus Lucas	355		
Local Education Action by Parents	Dorcas Rogers	323	8.1	
Total votes		9,141		
Liberal Democrats hold		Swing		
Liberal Democrats hold		Swing		
Liberal Democrats hold		Swing		

=== Streatham South ===
Streatham South (3)
Party	Candidate	Votes	%	±%
Labour	Mark Bennett *	1,725	43.1	
Labour	Dave Malley *	1,688		
Labour	John Kazantzis *	1,632		
Liberal Democrats	Ahmad Ali	1,483	37.0	
Liberal Democrats	Karen Davies	1,358		
Liberal Democrats	Matthew Bryant	1,244		
Conservative	Stuart Goodey	453	11.3	
Conservative	Carolena Ludwig	376		
Conservative	Christopher Sinclair	369		
Green	Anne Kenner	343	8.6	
Total votes		10,671		
Labour hold		Swing		
Labour hold		Swing		
Labour hold		Swing		

=== Streatham Wells ===
Streatham Wells (3)
Party	Candidate	Votes	%	±%
Liberal Democrats	Julian Heather *	1,484	48.0	
Liberal Democrats	Sheila Clarke *	1,449		
Liberal Democrats	Daphne Marchant	1,360		
Labour	Andrew Fisher	732	23.7	
Labour	Maxine James	725		
Labour	Clair Wilcox	666		
Green	Hannah Rowlands	513	16.6	
Conservative	Lisabeth Liell	365	11.8	
Conservative	Richard Liell	342		
Conservative	Margaret Molloy	332		
Total votes		7,968		
Liberal Democrats hold		Swing		
Liberal Democrats hold		Swing		
Liberal Democrats hold		Swing		

=== Thornton ===
Thornton (3)
Party	Candidate	Votes	%	±%
Labour	Lib Peck *	1,494	42.2	
Labour	Diana Morris	1,445		
Labour	Michael Hipwell	1,354		
Liberal Democrats	John Pindar *	1,094	30.9	
Liberal Democrats	James Sparling	946		
Liberal Democrats	Suzanne Whitehead	925		
Conservative	Joy Jackson	480	13.6	
Green	Adrian Audsley	470	13.3	
Conservative	Vernon de Maynard	462		
Conservative	Philippa Stone	457		
Green	Charles Evans	372		
Green	Louise Wakefield	363		
Total votes		9,862		
Labour hold		Swing		
Labour gain from Liberal Democrats		Swing		
Labour gain from Liberal Democrats		Swing		

=== Thurlow Park ===
Thurlow Park (3)
Party	Candidate	Votes	%	±%
Conservative	Clare Whelan *	1,738	40.9	
Conservative	John Whelan *	1,680		
Conservative	Irene Kimm *	1,460		
Labour	Sharon Erdman	762	17.9	
Green	Sheila Freeman	699	16.4	
Labour	Matthew Parr	667		
Liberal Democrats	Alan Beadnall	593	13.9	
Labour	Paul Teverson	558		
Liberal Democrats	Anton Baker	486		
Liberal Democrats	Andrew Thurburn	420		
Local Education Action by Parents	Stela Gildea	350	8.2	
UKIP	Robin Lambert	112	2.6	
Total votes		9,525		
Conservative hold		Swing		
Conservative hold		Swing		
Conservative hold		Swing		

=== Tulse Hill ===
Tulse Hill (3)
Party	Candidate	Votes	%	±%
Labour	Marcia Cameron	1,589	49.0	
Labour	Toren Smith *	1,528		
Labour	Adedamola Aminu	1,514		
Green	Bernard Atwell	718	22.1	
Liberal Democrats	James Lucas	582	18.0	
Liberal Democrats	Robert McConnell	432		
Liberal Democrats	Nick Perry	374		
Conservative	Josephine Lomax	353	10.9	
Conservative	Edna Richards	309		
Conservative	Roger Lomax	306		
Total votes		7,705		
Labour hold		Swing		
Labour hold		Swing		
Labour hold		Swing		

=== Vassall ===
Vassall (3)
Party	Candidate	Votes	%	±%
Labour	Kingsley Abrams	1,426	44.2	
Labour	Liz Atkinson *	1,421		
Labour	Alex McKenna *	1,305		
Liberal Democrats	Adeline Aina	1,146	35.5	
Liberal Democrats	Steve Bradley	1,092		
Liberal Democrats	Ernest Baidoo-Mitchell	1,044		
Conservative	Stuart Barr	369	11.4	
Conservative	Deborah Thomas	360		
Conservative	Judith Collier	341		
Respect	Stephen Hack	287	8.9	
Respect	Abdul Chowdhury	257		
Respect	Aboubakar Sako	234		
Total votes		9,282		
Labour hold		Swing		
Labour hold		Swing		
Labour hold		Swing		
