= Thurlow Park (ward) =

Coordinates: 51.441°N 0.099°W

- Former electoral ward for the Lambeth London Borough Council
- Borough: Lambeth
- County: Greater London

Former electoral ward
- Created: 1965
- Abolished: 2022
- Member(s): 3

Thurlow Park ward was an administrative division of the London Borough of Lambeth, England from 1965 to 2022.

It was located in the constituency of Dulwich and West Norwood.

It was located towards the south of the borough containing parts of Herne Hill, Tulse Hill (including the Tulse Hill railway station), and West Norwood. It was bordered in the north by Brockwell Park. The population of the ward at the 2011 Census was 13,641.

== Ward demographics ==
Below are the demographics for Thurlow Park

Gender (2018)
	Nbr	Percent
Males	6,966	49%
Females	7,262	51%

Age Groups (2018)
	Nbr	Percent
0–17 years	3,401	23.9%
18–64 years	9,407	66.1%
65+ years	1,420	10%

Ethnic Group (2011)
	Nbr	Percent
White	8,687	63.7%
Black	2,773	20.3%
Asian	804	5.9%
Mixed/multiple	1,117	8.2%
Other	260	1.7%

== Nearby attractions ==
- The historic River Effra
- South London Botanical Institute

== Gallery ==
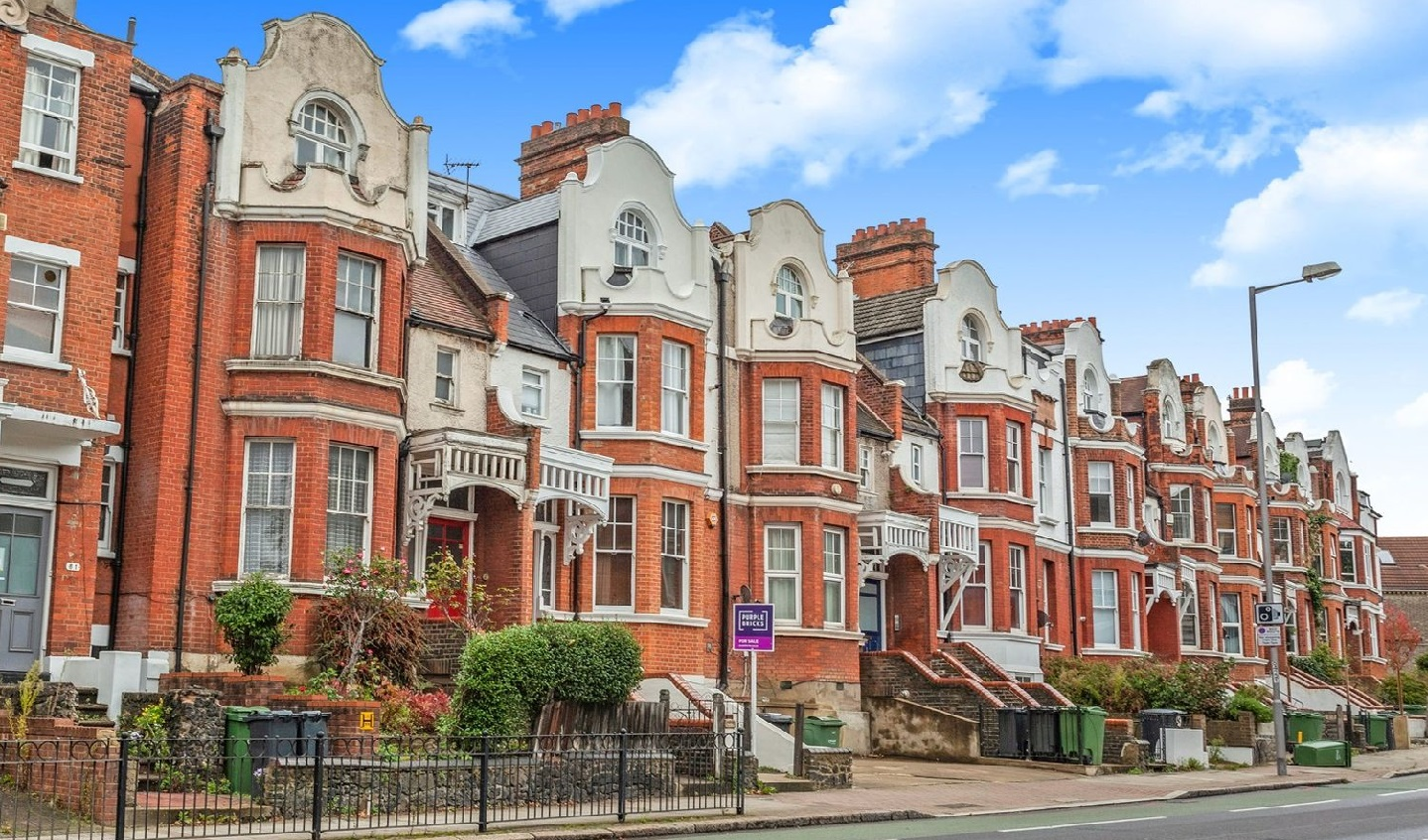
Edwardian Terrace Houses - Thurlow Park Rd (South Circular)

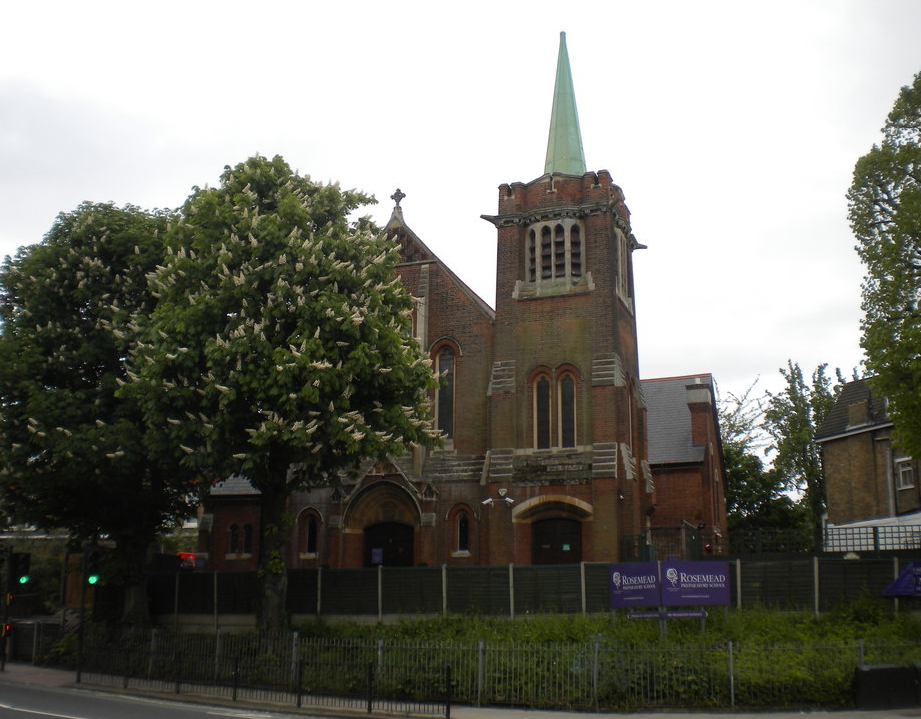
Rosemead Pre-Preparatory School, Formerly St. Cuthbert's Church

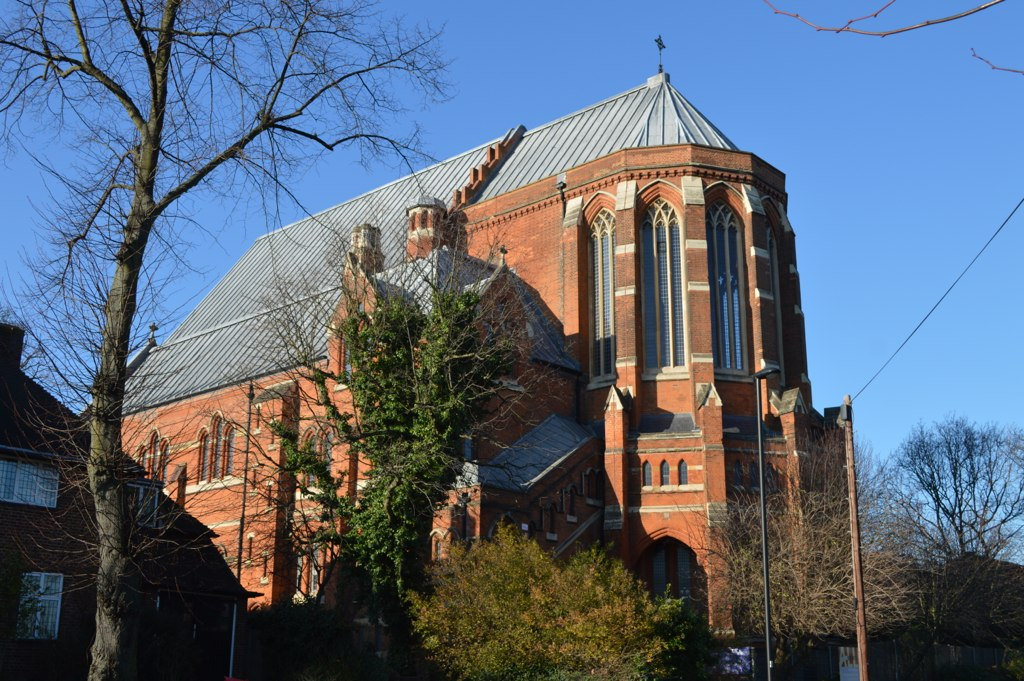
All Saints Church, Rosendale Rd

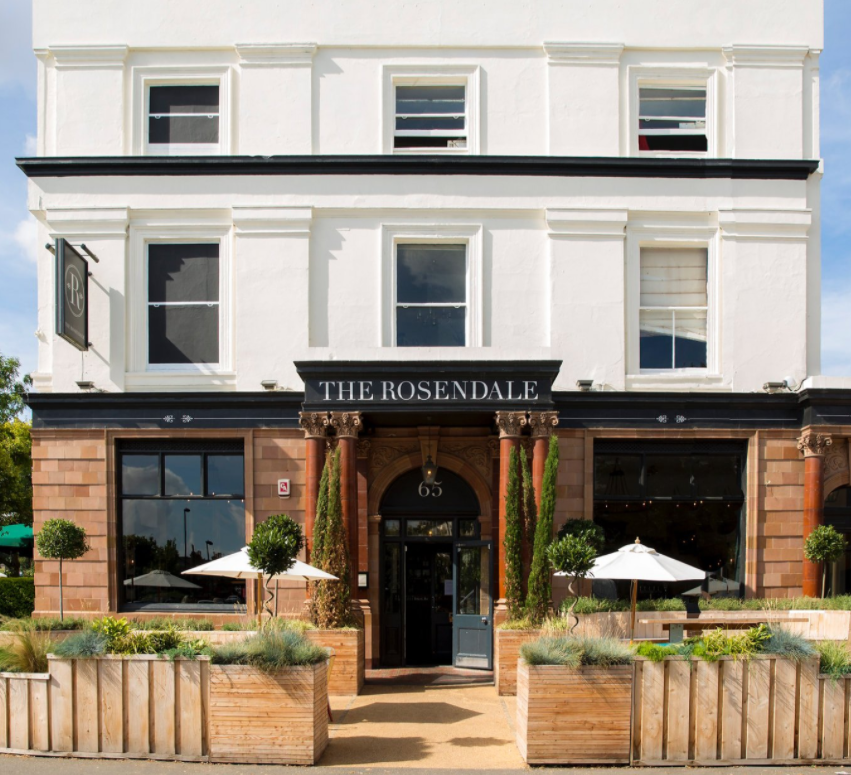
Rosendale Pubs, Former Victorian Coaching Inn

== Lambeth Council elections ==
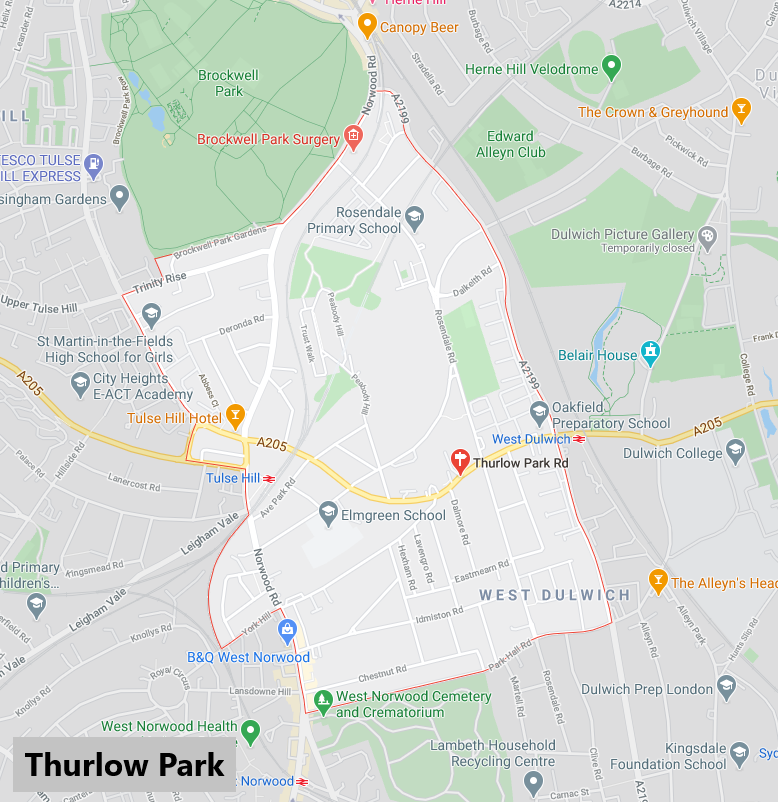
Thurlow Park ward boundaries from 2002 to 2022

=== 2018 election ===
2018 Lambeth London Borough Council election: Thurlow Park (3)
Party	Candidate	Votes	%	±%
Labour Co-op	Anna Birley*	2,377		
Labour Co-op	Fred Cowell*	2,308		
Labour Co-op	Peter Ely	2,076		
Conservative	Kelly Ben-Maimon	820		
Conservative	Elia Carvalho	820		
Conservative	Jack Kelly	761		
Liberal Democrats	Kathy Erasmus	691		
Liberal Democrats	Doug Buist	649		
Liberal Democrats	Bryan Mahon	576		
Green	Alice Playle	512		
Green	Danielle Montrose-Francis	461		
Green	Dale Mathers	458		
Independent	Robin Lambert	89		
Labour hold		Swing		
Labour hold		Swing		
Labour hold		Swing		

=== 2014 election ===
2014 Lambeth London Borough Council election: (3)
Party	Candidate	Votes	%	±%
Labour	Anna Birley	2,212		
Labour	Fred Cowell	2,122		
Labour	Max Deckers Dowber	2,031		
Conservative	Irene Kimm	1,117		
Conservative	Luke Tryl	1,097		
Conservative	Graham Pycock	1,020		
Green	Matt Farrow	673		
Green	Pat Price-Tomes	544		
Green	Jo Stone-Fewings	540		
Liberal Democrats	Andrew Thurburn	279		
UKIP	Robin Lambert	277		
Liberal Democrats	Malgorzata Baker	259		
Liberal Democrats	Jeremy Baker	254		
Total votes		14,825		
Labour gain from Conservative		Swing		
Labour hold		Swing		
Labour gain from Conservative		Swing		

=== 2010 election ===
2010 Lambeth London Borough Council election: Thurlow Park (3)
Party	Candidate	Votes	%	±%
Conservative	John Whelan *	2,452		
Labour	Ann Kingsbury	2,035		
Conservative	Clare Whelan *	2,023		
Labour	Robert Holden	1,945		
Conservative	Irene Kimm *	1,906		
Labour	Brian Cowie	1,888		
Liberal Democrats	Richard Bramwell	1,516		
Liberal Democrats	Dominic Carman	1,447		
Liberal Democrats	Andrew Thurburn	1,447		
Green	William Collins	781		
Green	Samarajit Roy	609		
Green	Dale Mathers	595		
UKIP	Robin Lambert	178		
Total votes		18,656		
Conservative hold		Swing		
Labour gain from Conservative		Swing		
Conservative hold		Swing		

=== 2006 election ===
2006 Lambeth London Borough Council election: Thurlow Park (3)
Party	Candidate	Votes	%	±%
Conservative	Clare Whelan *	1,738		
Conservative	John Whelan *	1,680		
Conservative	Irene Kimm *	1,460		
Labour	Sharon Erdman	762		
Green	Sheila Freeman	699		
Labour	Matthew Parr	667		
Liberal Democrats	Alan Beadnall	593		
Labour	Paul Teverson	558		
Liberal Democrats	Anton Baker	486		
Liberal Democrats	Andrew Thurburn	420		
Local Education Action by Parents	Stela Gildea	350		
UKIP	Robin Lambert	112		
Total votes		9,525		
Conservative hold		Swing		
Conservative hold		Swing		
Conservative hold		Swing		

=== 2002 election ===
2002 Lambeth London Borough Council election: Thurlow Park (3)
Party	Candidate	Votes	%	±%
Conservative	Clare Whelan *	1,484		
Conservative	John Whelan *	1,437		
Conservative	Irene Kimm *	1,308		
Labour	Judith Brodie	684		
Labour	David Rodgers	583		
Labour	Alan Wilmot	551		
Liberal Democrats	Alan Beadnall	466		
Liberal Democrats	Andrew Thurburn	336		
Green	Jeremy Hicks	329		
Liberal Democrats	Duncan Brack	319		
UKIP	Robin Lambert	53		
Turnout		7,550	29.6	
Conservative hold		Swing		
Conservative hold		Swing		
Conservative hold		Swing		
