= 2002 Lambeth London Borough Council election =

2002 Lambeth Council election
- 2 May 2002

All 63 council seats
	First party	Second party	Third party
	Lib	Lab	Con
Leader	Peter Truesdale	Tom Franklin	John Whelan
Party	Liberal Democrats	Labour	Conservative
Leader since	1998	May 2000	1998
Leader's seat	Bishop's	Tulse Hill	Thurlow Park
Seats won	28	28	7
Seat change	▲10	▼13	▲2
Popular vote	18,647	20,503	9,080
Percentage	33.3%	36.6%	16.2%
- Map of the results of the 2002 Lambeth council election. Conservatives in blue, Labour in red and Liberal Democrats in yellow.
Leader of Largest Party before election
Tom Franklin
Labour
Subsequent Leader of Largest Party
Peter Truesdale
Liberal Democrats

Elections to Lambeth London Borough Council were held on 2 May 2002. The whole council was up for election with boundary changes reducing the number of councillors by one since the last election in 1998. Labour despite having the largest number of votes with 36.6% of the vote, it still lost 13 seats, while the Liberal Democrats and the Conservative Party gained seats, resulting in Labour losing control of the council and no party having a majority.

Following the election, the Liberal Democrats and Conservatives formed a coalition to run the council with Cllr Peter Truesdale, Liberal Democrat, as Leader and Cllr John Whelan, Conservative, as Deputy Leader.

== Election result ==
Lambeth local election result 2002
Party	Seats	Gains	Losses	Net gain/loss	Seats %	Votes %	Votes	+/−
Labour	28			-13	44.4	36.6	20,503	
Liberal Democrats	28			+10	44.4	33.3	18,647	
Conservative	7			+2	11.1	16.2	9,080	
Green	0			±0	0.0	11.5	6,426	
Socialist Alliance	0			±0	0.0	2.1	1,178	
Independent	0			±0	0.0	0.1	60	
UKIP	0			±0	0.0	0.1	53	

== Ward results ==
=== Bishop's ===
Bishop's (3)
Party	Candidate	Votes	%	±%
Liberal Democrats	Peter Truesdale	1,123	20.9	
Liberal Democrats	Charlotte Parry	1,039	19.3	
Liberal Democrats	Clive Parry	994	18.5	
Labour	Lorna Campbell	622	11.6	
Labour	Madge McGhie	506	9.4	
Labour	Lee Seaman	488	9.1	
Green	Simon Williams	166	3.1	
Conservative	Audrey Blaine	125	2.3	
Conservative	Caroline King	121	2.3	
Conservative	Judith Pattman	106	2.0	
Socialist Alliance	Veronica Planton	80	1.5	
Turnout		5,370	27.3	
Liberal Democrats win (new boundaries)				
Liberal Democrats win (new boundaries)				
Liberal Democrats win (new boundaries)				

=== Brixton Hill ===
Brixton Hill (3)
Party	Candidate	Votes	%	±%
Labour	Nick Cattermole	1,067	17.7	
Labour	Steve Reed	1,017	16.9	
Labour	Lydia Serwaa	1,015	16.9	
Green	Debbie Dixon	459	7.6	
Green	Wayne Greening	393	6.5	
Liberal Democrats	Elsie Binder	377	6.3	
Liberal Democrats	Alexandra Colling	312	5.2	
Liberal Democrats	Martin Morris	312	5.2	
Socialist Alliance	Julie Hall	292	4.9	
Conservative	Patrick Butler	272	4.5	
Conservative	Matthew Bartlett	251	4.2	
Conservative	Roland Gilbert	249	4.1	
Turnout		6,106	21.8	
Labour win (new boundaries)				
Labour win (new boundaries)				
Labour win (new boundaries)				

=== Clapham Common ===
Clapham Common (3)
Party	Candidate	Votes	%	±%
Labour	Ruth Ling	972	12.3	
Liberal Democrats	Angela Meander	964	12.2	
Liberal Democrats	Darren Sanders	917	11.6	
Labour	Andy Harrop	863	10.9	
Labour	Roland Doven	856	10.8	
Liberal Democrats	Matthew Bryant	839	10.6	
Conservative	Joanna Barker	748	9.4	
Conservative	Anthony Bays	744	9.4	
Conservative	Gareth Williams	739	9.3	
Green	Timothy Beaumont	274	3.5	
Turnout		7,916	30.1	
Labour win (new boundaries)				
Liberal Democrats win (new boundaries)				
Liberal Democrats win (new boundaries)				

=== Clapham Town ===
Clapham Town (3)
Party	Candidate	Votes	%	±%
Labour	Helen O'Malley	1,179	15.3	
Labour	Jonathan Myerson	1,160	15.1	
Conservative	Bernard Gentry	1,074	13.9	
Conservative	Andrew Hollingsworth	983	12.8	
Labour	Koysor Syed	968	12.6	
Conservative	Edward Heckels	958	12.4	
Liberal Democrats	Helen Belcher	397	5.2	
Green	Albere Hanna	382	5.0	
Liberal Democrats	Robert Banks	332	4.3	
Liberal Democrats	Robert Blackie	259	3.4	
Independent	James Martin	13	0.2	
Turnout		7,705	27.5	
Labour win (new boundaries)				
Labour win (new boundaries)				
Conservative win (new boundaries)				

=== Coldharbour ===
Coldharbour (3)
Party	Candidate	Votes	%	±%
Labour	Donatus Anyanwu	989	21.1	
Labour	Sharon Erdman	949	20.3	
Labour	Sharon Ward	899	19.2	
Green	William Collins	241	5.1	
Green	Paul Martin	219	4.7	
Green	Mohammed Sajid	217	4.6	
Liberal Democrats	Lindsay Avebury	215	4.6	
Liberal Democrats	Vivienne Baines	203	4.3	
Liberal Democrats	Malcolm Baines	181	3.9	
Socialist Alliance	Theresa Bennett	152	3.2	
Conservative	Nicholas Brown	122	2.4	
Conservative	Glyn Chambers	108	1.9	
Conservative	John Lamont	105	1.8	
Independent	Robin Gibson	47	1.0	
Independent	Gary Bruton	43	0.9	
Independent	Darren Iliffe	40	0.9	
Turnout		4,680	17.1	
Labour win (new boundaries)				
Labour win (new boundaries)				
Labour win (new boundaries)				

=== Ferndale ===
Ferndale (3)
Party	Candidate	Votes	%	±%
Labour	Imran Hussain	1,031	21.5	
Labour	Paul McGlone	1,021	21.3	
Labour	Sally Prentice	977	20.4	
Liberal Democrats	Catherine Cumberbatch-Barnett	340	7.1	
Liberal Democrats	Patrick Mitchell	314	6.6	
Green	Jeffrey Dalton	300	6.3	
Liberal Democrats	Steven Rhodes	300	6.3	
Conservative	Helen Gentry	171	3.6	
Conservative	Richard Forsdyke	170	3.5	
Conservative	Verity Forsdyke	167	3.5	
Turnout		4,791	17.6	
Labour win (new boundaries)				
Labour win (new boundaries)				
Labour win (new boundaries)				

=== Gipsy Hill ===
Gipsy Hill (3)
Party	Candidate	Votes	%	±%
Conservative	Janet Grigg	1,579	18.0	
Conservative	Russell A'Court	1,571	17.9	
Conservative	Gareth Compton	1,509	17.2	
Labour	David Green	1,034	11.8	
Labour	Marcia Cameron	1,001	11.4	
Labour	John Muir	899	10.2	
Green	Jessica Cahill	251	2.9	
Liberal Democrats	David Boyle	237	2.7	
Green	David Goodman	182	2.1	
Liberal Democrats	Peta Cubberley	180	2.0	
Green	Kathleen Manuell	178	2.0	
Liberal Democrats	Joel Robinson	165	1.9	
Turnout		8,786	32.3	
Conservative win (new boundaries)				
Conservative win (new boundaries)				
Conservative win (new boundaries)				

=== Herne Hill ===
Herne Hill (3)
Party	Candidate	Votes	%	±%
Labour	Jim Dickson	1,164	18.1	
Labour	Kirsty McHugh	1,160	18.0	
Labour	Peter O'Connell	898	14.0	
Green	Timothy Summers	609	9.5	
Liberal Democrats	Monica Armitage-Smith	511	7.9	
Liberal Democrats	Julia Goldsworthy	486	7.6	
Conservative	Anthony Jones	415	6.4	
Conservative	James Ford	407	6.3	
Conservative	Edna Richards	397	6.2	
Liberal Democrats	James Lundie	389	6.0	
Turnout		6,436	21.5	
Labour win (new boundaries)				
Labour win (new boundaries)				
Labour win (new boundaries)				

=== Knight's Hill ===
Knight's Hill (3)
Party	Candidate	Votes	%	±%
Liberal Democrats	Geraldine Evans	1,331	17.2	
Liberal Democrats	Robert McConnell	1,263	16.3	
Liberal Democrats	Jeremy Baker	1,260	16.2	
Labour	Tony Grayling	949	12.2	
Labour	Bill Watling	926	11.9	
Labour	Robert Hill	908	11.7	
Conservative	Martin Ball	258	3.3	
Green	Graham Jones	251	3.2	
Conservative	Jessica Lee	250	3.2	
Conservative	Christine Hemmise	245	3.2	
Socialist Alliance	Leslie Watson	113	1.5	
Turnout		7,754	27.4	
Liberal Democrats win (new boundaries)				
Liberal Democrats win (new boundaries)				
Liberal Democrats win (new boundaries)				

=== Larkhall ===
Larkhall (3)
Party	Candidate	Votes	%	±%
Labour	Kevin Craig	1,307	19.7	
Labour	Joanna Clason	1,256	18.9	
Labour	Gary Follis	1,190	17.9	
Liberal Democrats	Monique Blythe	664	10.0	
Liberal Democrats	Rosario Munday	631	9.5	
Liberal Democrats	Scott McAusland	610	9.2	
Green	Sally Zlotowitz	260	3.9	
Conservative	Charles Crawford	203	3.1	
Conservative	Charles Pender	200	3.0	
Conservative	William Trelawny	196	3.0	
Socialist Alliance	Tina Humphries	127	1.9	
Turnout		6,644	22.2	
Labour win (new boundaries)				
Labour win (new boundaries)				
Labour win (new boundaries)				

=== Oval ===
Oval (3)
Party	Candidate	Votes	%	±%
Liberal Democrats	Marietta Crichton-Stuart	1,297	20.3	
Liberal Democrats	Geoffrey Bowring	1,178	18.4	
Liberal Democrats	Andrew Sawdon	1,151	18.0	
Labour	Giacomo Benedetto	645	10.1	
Labour	Patrick Diamond	590	9.2	
Labour	Neil Goulbourne	576	9.0	
Green	Brian Heatley	255	4.0	
Conservative	Christopher Sinclair	201	3.1	
Conservative	Arthur Hardman	197	3.1	
Conservative	Penelope Sinclair	184	2.9	
Socialist Alliance	Andrew Jackson	116	1.8	
Turnout		6,390	24.2	
Liberal Democrats win (new boundaries)				
Liberal Democrats win (new boundaries)				
Liberal Democrats win (new boundaries)				

=== Prince's ===
Princes's (3)
Party	Candidate	Votes	%	±%
Liberal Democrats	Keith Fitchett	1,444	16.3	
Liberal Democrats	Charles Anglin	1,404	15.8	
Liberal Democrats	Dinti Wakefield	1,402	15.8	
Labour	Stephen Morgan	1,236	13.9	
Labour	Peter Bowyer	1,185	13.4	
Labour	Samuel Townend	1,183	13.3	
Conservative	Andrew Hayes	264	3.0	
Green	James Wallace	260	2.9	
Conservative	Simon Allison	250	2.8	
Conservative	Kiloran Heckels	242	2.7	
Turnout		8,870	34.0	
Liberal Democrats win (new boundaries)				
Liberal Democrats win (new boundaries)				
Liberal Democrats win (new boundaries)				

=== St Leonard's ===
St Leonard's (3)
Party	Candidate	Votes	%	±%
Liberal Democrats	Clive Bennett *	1,517	19.4	
Liberal Democrats	Roger Giess *	1,422	18.2	
Liberal Democrats	Brian Palmer *	1,419	18.1	
Labour	Denese Clarke	841	10.8	
Labour	Matthew Salter	813	10.4	
Labour	Brian Whitington	706	9.0	
Green	Anne Kenner	290	3.7	
Conservative	Alastair Hamilton	284	3.6	
Conservative	Nicholas Wailes	280	3.6	
Conservative	Philip Murley	250	3.6	
Turnout		7,822	27.0	
Liberal Democrats win (new boundaries)				
Liberal Democrats win (new boundaries)				
Liberal Democrats win (new boundaries)				

=== Stockwell ===
Stockwell (3)
Party	Candidate	Votes	%	±%
Liberal Democrats	Anthony Bottrall	1,549	20.6	
Liberal Democrats	Marcus Mayers	1,280	17.0	
Liberal Democrats	Gabriel Fernandes	1,219	16.2	
Labour	Michael English	991	13.2	
Labour	Esther Green	931	12.4	
Labour	Toaha Qureshi	882	11.7	
Green	Peter Crush	260	3.5	
Conservative	Judith Collier	167	2.2	
Conservative	John Midgley	125	1.7	
Conservative	Laura Midgley	124	1.6	
Turnout		7,528	29.3	
Liberal Democrats win (new boundaries)				
Liberal Democrats win (new boundaries)				
Liberal Democrats win (new boundaries)				

=== Streatham Hill ===
Streatham Hill (3)
Party	Candidate	Votes	%	±%
Liberal Democrats	June Fewtrell	1,272	19.3	
Liberal Democrats	Jeremy Clyne	1,158	17.6	
Liberal Democrats	Ashley Lumsden	1,120	17.0	
Labour	Alex Ekumah	632	9.6	
Labour	Mohammed Abu-Bakr	631	9.6	
Labour	Daniel Lawuyi	561	8.5	
Green	Martin Wright	378	5.7	
Conservative	Stanley Davies	287	4.4	
Conservative	Susan Ellis	284	4.3	
Conservative	Peter Younghusband	264	4.0	
Turnout		6,587	24.0	
Liberal Democrats win (new boundaries)				
Liberal Democrats win (new boundaries)				
Liberal Democrats win (new boundaries)				

=== Streatham South ===
Streatham South (3)
Party	Candidate	Votes	%	±%
Labour	Dave Malley	1,188	14.7	
Labour	John Kazantzis	1,123	13.9	
Labour	Tim Sargeant	1,093	13.5	
Liberal Democrats	Wendy Golding	1,027	12.7	
Liberal Democrats	Robert Williams	943	11.7	
Liberal Democrats	Graham Lee	931	11.5	
Conservative	Habib Choudhury	538	6.7	
Conservative	Stephen McMenamin	517	6.4	
Conservative	Michael Winch	507	6.3	
Green	Michael O'Gara	208	2.6	
Turnout		8,075	30.6	
Labour win (new boundaries)				
Labour win (new boundaries)				
Labour win (new boundaries)				

=== Streatham Wells ===
Streatham Wells (3)
Party	Candidate	Votes	%	±%
Liberal Democrats	Julian Heather	1,440	21.4	
Liberal Democrats	Sheila Clarke	1,418	21.1	
Liberal Democrats	Daphne Hayes-Mojon	1,383	20.6	
Labour	Pius Badejo	555	8.3	
Labour	David Walker	528	7.9	
Labour	Mikis Euripides	501	7.5	
Green	Sheila Freeman	279	4.2	
Conservative	Amanda Hodgkinson	217	3.2	
Conservative	Lisabeth Liell	211	3.1	
Conservative	Neil Salt	186	2.8	
Turnout		6,718	24.9	
Liberal Democrats win (new boundaries)				
Liberal Democrats win (new boundaries)				
Liberal Democrats win (new boundaries)				

=== Thornton ===
Thornton (3)
Party	Candidate	Votes	%	±%
Liberal Democrats	John Pindar	1,291	16.3	
Liberal Democrats	Stephen Dering	1,191	15.1	
Labour	Lib Peck	1,142	14.5	
Liberal Democrats	Veronica Ijeoma	1,137	14.4	
Labour	Yemi Adisa-Adesina	1,080	13.7	
Labour	Joe Moll	1,057	13.4	
Green	David Ince	277	3.5	
Conservative	Joy Jackson	268	3.4	
Conservative	Roger Bennett	257	3.3	
Conservative	Barbara Winbourne	197	2.5	
Turnout		7,897	31.8	
Liberal Democrats win (new boundaries)				
Liberal Democrats win (new boundaries)				
Labour win (new boundaries)				

=== Thurlow Park ===
Thurlow Park (3)
Party	Candidate	Votes	%	±%
Conservative	Clare Whelan	1,484	19.7	
Conservative	John Whelan	1,437	19.0	
Conservative	Irene Kimm	1,308	17.3	
Labour	Judith Brodie	684	9.1	
Labour	David Rodgers	583	7.7	
Labour	Alan Wilmot	551	7.3	
Liberal Democrats	Alan Beadnall	466	6.2	
Liberal Democrats	Andrew Thurburn	336	4.5	
Green	Jeremy Hicks	329	4.4	
Liberal Democrats	Duncan Brack	319	4.2	
UKIP	Robin Lambert	53	0.7	
Turnout		7,550	29.6	
Conservative win (new boundaries)				
Conservative win (new boundaries)				
Conservative win (new boundaries)				

=== Tulse Hill ===
Tulse Hill (3)
Party	Candidate	Votes	%	±%
Labour	Jackie Meldrum	1,219	21.0	
Labour	Tom Franklin	1,078	18.6	
Labour	Toren Smith	1,017	17.6	
Green	John Yates	440	7.6	
Liberal Democrats	Ann Savage	334	5.8	
Green	Keith Hatch	333	5.8	
Liberal Democrats	Roger O'Brien	290	5.0	
Liberal Democrats	Karl Davies	285	4.9	
Conservative	Claire Baker	225	3.9	
Conservative	David Owens	215	3.7	
Conservative	Dan Tweyman	184	3.2	
Socialist Alliance	Gregory Tucker	171	3.0	
Turnout		5,791	21.2	
Labour win (new boundaries)				
Labour win (new boundaries)				
Labour win (new boundaries)				

=== Vassall ===
Vassall (3)
Party	Candidate	Votes	%	±%
Labour	Liz Atkinson	1,056	16.9	
Labour	Alex McKenna	943	15.1	
Labour	Daniel Sabbagh	895	14.3	
Liberal Democrats	Tom Cornwall	851	13.6	
Liberal Democrats	Antonia Ewetuga	846	13.5	
Liberal Democrats	Rene Kinzett	744	11.9	
Green	Keith Sperry	257	4.1	
Conservative	Nicholas Gibbon	188	3.0	
Conservative	Antony Shakespeare	181	2.9	
Conservative	Laurence King	165	2.6	
Socialist Alliance	Brenda Downes	127	2.0	
Turnout		6,253	23.3	
Labour win (new boundaries)				
Labour win (new boundaries)				
Labour win (new boundaries)				
