= 2010 Lambeth London Borough Council election =

2010 Lambeth Council election
- 6 May 2010

All council seats
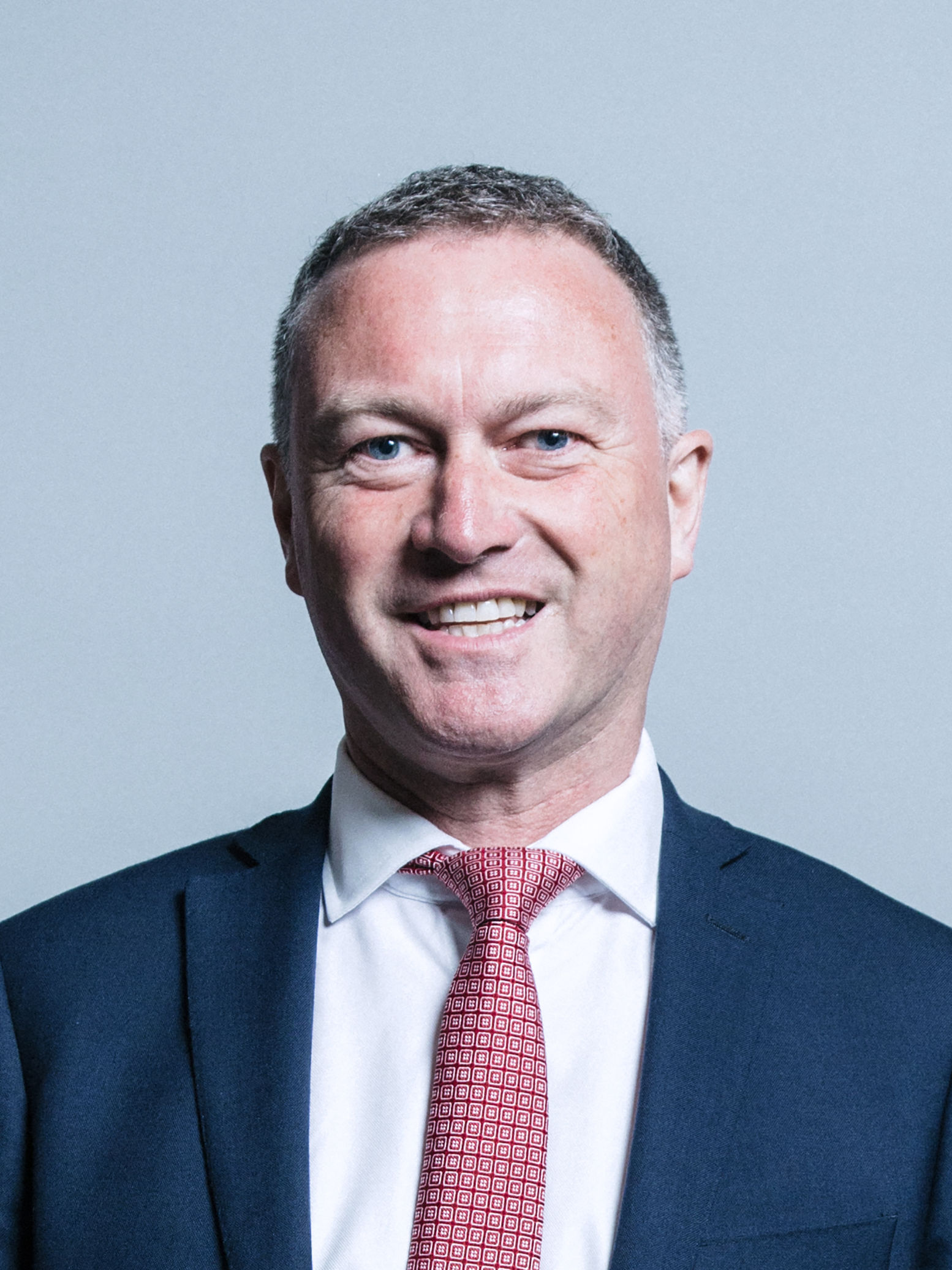

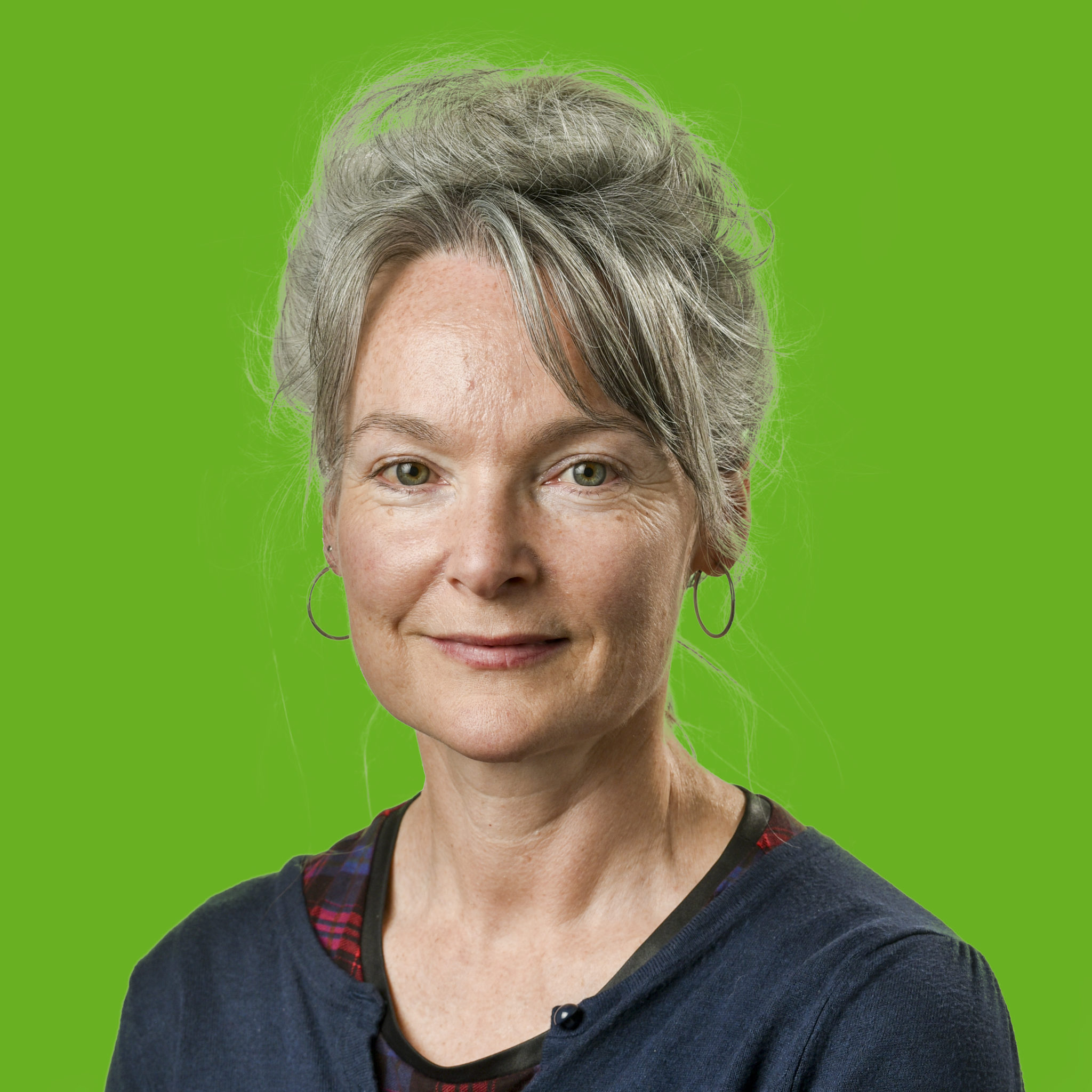
	First party	Second party
		Lib
Leader	Steve Reed	Ashley Lumsden
Party	Labour	Liberal Democrats
Leader since	September 2002	May 2006
Leader's seat	Brixton Hill	Streatham Hill
Last election	39 seats, 39.7%	17 seats, 29.1%
Seats won	44	15
Seat change	▲5	▼2
Popular vote	53,925	36,458
Percentage	41.8%	28.3%
Swing	▲2.1%	▼0.8%
	Third party	Fourth party
	Con
Leader	John Whelan	Becca Thackray
Party	Conservative	Green
Leader since	1998	4 May 2006
Leader's seat	Thurlow Park	Herne Hill (retiring)
Last election	6 seats, 19.2%	1 seats, 9.7%
Seats won	4	0
Seat change	▼2	▼1
Popular vote	24,487	17,560
Percentage	19.0%	10.1%
Swing	▼0.2%	▲0.4%
- Map of the results of the 2010 Lambeth council election. Conservatives in blue, Labour in red and Liberal Democrats in yellow.
Leader of largest party before election
Steve Reed
Labour
Subsequent leader of largest party
Steve Reed
Labour

Elections to Lambeth London Borough Council were held on 6 May 2010. All 63 seats were up for election. Turnout was 58%. The Labour Party retained control of the council, increasing its majority. The elections took place on the same day as other local elections and the United Kingdom general election.

== Results ==
Lambeth Council election result 2010
Party	Seats	Gains	Losses	Net gain/loss	Seats %	Votes %	Votes	+/−
Labour	44	6	1	+5	69.8	41.8	53,925	+6.4
Liberal Democrats	15	0	2	−2	23.8	28.3	36,458	+1.2
Conservative	4	2	4	−2	6.3	19.0	24,487	+1.7
Green	0	0	1	−1	0.0	10.1	13,036	-5.9
Independent	0	0	0	0	0.0	0.3	393	−0.5
English Democrat	0	0	0	0	0.0	0.2	272	±0.0
UKIP	0	0	0	0	0.0	0.1	178	-0.1
CPA	0	0	0	0	0.0	0.1	169	New
Socialist (GB)	0	0	0	0	0.0	0.1	130	±0.0

== Ward results ==
* - Existing Councillor seeking re-election.

=== Bishop's ===
Bishop's (3 councillors)
Party	Candidate	Votes	%	±%
Liberal Democrats	Diana Braithwaite *	1,676	41.6	
Liberal Democrats	Peter Truesdale *	1,641	40.7	
Liberal Democrats	Gavin Dodsworth *	1,483	36.8	
Labour	Jennifer Moseley	1,307	32.4	
Labour	Kevin Craig	1,256	31.2	
Labour	Jack Sutcliffe	1,067	26.5	
Conservative	Edward Blain	751	18.6	
Conservative	Edward Jones	667	16.6	
Conservative	Rickard Jonsson	649	16.1	
Green	Colin Kavanagh	339	8.4	
Green	James Wallace	288	7.1	
Green	Jonathan Stone-Fewings	197	4.9	
Total votes		4,029	52.8	
Liberal Democrats hold		Swing		
Liberal Democrats hold		Swing		
Liberal Democrats hold		Swing		

=== Brixton Hill ===
Brixton Hill (3 councillors)
Party	Candidate	Votes	%	±%
Labour	Alexander Holland	2,805	42.0	
Labour	Steve Reed *	2,699	40.4	
Labour	Florence Nosegbe *	2,648	39.6	
Liberal Democrats	Kate Horstead	2,100	31.4	
Liberal Democrats	Krystal Johnson	1,873	28.0	
Liberal Democrats	John Mead	1,560	23.3	
Green	Thomas Law	1,108	16.6	
Green	Elkin Atwell	1,023	15.3	
Conservative	Timothy Briggs	873	13.1	
Green	Phillipa Marlowe-Hunt	850	12.7	
Conservative	Victoria Edwards *	768	11.5	
Conservative	Diana Thompson	688	10.3	
Total votes		6,684	59.0	
Labour hold		Swing		
Labour hold		Swing		
Labour hold		Swing		

=== Clapham Common ===
Clapham Common (3 councillors)
Party	Candidate	Votes	%	±%
Liberal Democrats	Christine Barratt	2,176	35.8	
Conservative	Shirley Cosgrave	2,084	34.3	
Conservative	Julia Memery	1,940	31.9	
Conservative	Lloyd Milton	1,849	30.4	
Labour	Ruth Ling *	1,715	28.2	
Labour	Linda Bray	1,637	26.9	
Liberal Democrats	Simon Cordon	1,606	26.4	
Liberal Democrats	Julian Heather	1,579	26.0	
Labour	Iain Simpson	1,408	23.2	
Green	Anne Base	502	8.3	
Green	Jamie Hamilton	445	7.3	
Green	Anne Kenner	270	4.4	
Total votes		6,078	61.1	
Liberal Democrats hold		Swing		
Conservative gain from Labour		Swing		
Conservative gain from Liberal Democrats		Swing		

=== Clapham Town ===
Clapham Town (3 councillors)
Party	Candidate	Votes	%	±%
Labour	Helen O'Malley *	2,670	42.3	
Labour	Nigel Haselden *	2,654	42.0	
Labour	Christopher Wellbelove *	2,405	38.1	
Conservative	Bernard Gentry	2,028	32.1	
Conservative	Matthew Jupp	1,972	31.2	
Conservative	Nicholas Maund	1,803	28.5	
Liberal Democrats	Vivienne Baines	1,092	17.3	
Liberal Democrats	Charlotte Parry	1,052	16.7	
Liberal Democrats	Malcolm Baines	974	15.4	
Green	Marion Prideaux	497	7.9	
Green	Roger Baker	406	6.4	
Green	Darren Raven	225	3.6	
Total votes		6,317	59.2	
Labour hold		Swing		
Labour hold		Swing		
Labour hold		Swing		

=== Coldharbour ===
Coldharbour (3 councillors)
Party	Candidate	Votes	%	±%
Labour	Rachel Heywood *	3,983	64.4	
Labour	Donatus Anyanwu *	3,819	61.7	
Labour	Matthew Parr	3,681	59.5	
Liberal Democrats	Rachel Lester	1,091	17.6	
Liberal Democrats	Hilary Lavender	1,081	17.5	
Liberal Democrats	Angela Meader	808	13.1	
Green	Geoffrey Burgess	611	9.9	
Conservative	Thomas Baker	581	9.4	
Green	Olivier Bertin	573	9.3	
Green	Alexander James	511	8.3	
Conservative	Yvonne Stewart-Williams	458	7.4	
Conservative	Graham Pycock	430	7.0	
CPA	David Williams	169	2.7	
Total votes		6,185	53.3	
Labour hold		Swing		
Labour hold		Swing		
Labour hold		Swing		

=== Ferndale ===
Ferndale (3 councillors)
Party	Candidate	Votes	%	±%
Labour	Paul McGlone *	2,761	46.2	
Labour	Sally Prentice *	2,703	45.2	
Labour	Neil Sabharwal *	2,377	39.8	
Liberal Democrats	Ernest Baidoo-Mitchell	1,383	23.1	
Liberal Democrats	Roy Jenkins	1,367	22.9	
Liberal Democrats	Geoffrey Bowring	1,313	22.0	
Conservative	Isabella Ginnett	1,199	20.1	
Conservative	Lee Roberts	1,053	17.6	
Conservative	Richard Moore	1,052	17.6	
Green	Tamsyn East	632	10.6	
Green	Daniel Bracken	613	10.3	
Green	James Montgomery	525	8.8	
Socialist (GB)	Daniel Lambert	82	1.4	
Socialist (GB)	John Lee	48	0.8	
Socialist (GB)	Jacqueline Shodeke	45	0.8	
Total votes		5,976	51.8	
Labour hold		Swing		
Labour hold		Swing		
Labour hold		Swing		

=== Gipsy Hill ===
Gipsy Hill (3 councillors)
Party	Candidate	Votes	%	±%
Labour	Matthew Bennett	2,670	45.3	
Labour	Niranjan Francis	2,597	44.1	
Labour	Jennifer Brathwaite	2,588	43.9	
Conservative	Andrew Gibson *	1,654	28.1	
Conservative	Suzanne Poole *	1,611	27.3	
Conservative	Carl Belgrove	1,585	26.9	
Liberal Democrats	Yvonne aan de Wiel	1,055	17.9	
Liberal Democrats	Wendy Horler	1,016	17.2	
Liberal Democrats	Danielle Lowson	852	14.5	
Green	David Sinclair	462	7.8	
Green	Geoff Dennis	347	5.9	
Green	Anthony Shuster	332	5.6	
Total votes		5,891	60.4	
Labour gain from Conservative		Swing		
Labour gain from Conservative		Swing		
Labour gain from Conservative		Swing		

=== Herne Hill ===
Herne Hill (3 councillors)
Party	Candidate	Votes	%	±%
Labour	Jim Dickson *	3,170	46.0	
Labour	Carol Boucher	3,057	44.3	
Labour	Leanne Targett-Parker	2,685	38.9	
Green	Louise Jordan	1,651	23.9	
Green	George Graham	1,599	23.2	
Green	William Hare	1,478	21.4	
Liberal Democrats	Martin Hoenle	1,147	16.6	
Liberal Democrats	Gail Price	1,127	16.3	
Conservative	Hamish Badenoch	1,047	15.2	
Conservative	Anna Box	1,021	14.8	
Liberal Democrats	Jonathan Price	904	13.1	
Conservative	Bettie Morton	862	12.5	
Total votes		6,895	63.5	
Labour hold		Swing		
Labour gain from Green		Swing		
Labour hold		Swing		

=== Knight's Hill ===
Knight's Hill (3 councillors)
Party	Candidate	Votes	%	±%
Labour	Jackie Meldrum *	3,039	52.2	
Labour	Jane Pickard	2,900	49.8	
Labour	Michael Smith	2,768	47.6	
Liberal Democrats	Timothy Barnsley	1,480	25.4	
Liberal Democrats	Malgorzata Baker	1,430	24.6	
Liberal Democrats	James Fitzgerald	1,415	24.3	
Conservative	Betty Evans-Jacas	942	16.2	
Conservative	Nicholas Rogers	926	15.9	
Conservative	Luke Tryl	809	13.9	
Green	Kirsty Neal	420	7.2	
Green	Alexis Fidgett	378	6.5	
Green	Nicholas Giannissis	357	6.1	
Total votes		5,821	58.7	
Labour hold		Swing		
Labour hold		Swing		
Labour hold		Swing		

=== Larkhall ===
Larkhall (3 councillors)
Party	Candidate	Votes	%	±%
Labour	Peter Robbins *	2,674	44.7	
Labour	Neeraj Patil *	2,464	41.2	
Labour	Christiana Valcarcel *	2,344	39.2	
Liberal Democrats	Jessica David	1,538	25.7	
Liberal Democrats	Alistair Mills	1,330	22.2	
Conservative	Robert Harris	1,294	21.6	
Conservative	Sebastian Lowe	1,292	21.6	
Conservative	Alison Trelawny	1,206	20.1	
Liberal Democrats	Clive Parry	1,158	19.3	
Green	Jeffrey Dalton	674	11.3	
Green	William Webb	673	11.2	
Green	Sam Trice	409	6.8	
Socialist (GB)	Oliver Bond	48	0.8	
Socialist (GB)	Stanley Parker	46	0.8	
Socialist (GB)	Adam Buick	45	0.8	
Total votes		5,987	50.5	
Labour hold		Swing		
Labour hold		Swing		
Labour hold		Swing		

=== Oval ===
Oval (3 councillors)
Party	Candidate	Votes	%	±%
Labour	Angela Edbrooke	2,274	37.3	
Labour	Jack Hopkins	2,246	36.8	
Liberal Democrats	Ishbel Brown	2,175	35.7	
Liberal Democrats	Claudette Hewitt	2,068	33.9	
Liberal Democrats	Andrew Sawdon *	2,020	33.1	
Labour	Karim Palant	1,987	32.6	
Conservative	Oliver Campbell	1,080	17.7	
Conservative	Nick Timothy	951	15.6	
Conservative	Michele Imperi	857	14.1	
Green	Charles Boxer	668	11.0	
Green	Samuel Low	422	6.9	
Green	James Staunton	332	5.4	
English Democrat	Michael Perry	77	1.3	
English Democrat	Jose Navarro	64	1.0	
English Democrat	Issam Ebarek-Rmiki	56	0.9	
Total votes		6,097	55.9	
Labour gain from Liberal Democrats		Swing		
Labour gain from Liberal Democrats		Swing		
Liberal Democrats hold		Swing		

=== Prince's ===
Prince's (3 councillors)
Party	Candidate	Votes	%	±%
Labour	Mark Harrison	2,847	45.7	
Labour	Lorna Campbell *	2,804	45.0	
Labour	Stephen Morgan *	2,653	42.6	
Liberal Democrats	Gloria Gomez Canal	1,371	22.0	
Liberal Democrats	Sandra Lawman	1,343	21.6	
Liberal Democrats	John Munro	1,246	20.0	
Conservative	James Bellis	1,161	18.6	
Conservative	Michael Poole-Wilson	1,083	17.4	
Conservative	Richard Rajgopaul-Hicklin	1,051	16.9	
Green	Emily Butterworth	644	10.3	
Green	Joseph Healy	381	6.1	
Green	Marcus Letts	337	5.4	
English Democrat	John Dodds	135	2.2	
English Democrat	Alfredo Cordal	106	1.7	
Total votes		6,231	57.8	
Labour hold		Swing		
Labour hold		Swing		
Labour hold		Swing		

=== St Leonard's ===
St Leonard's (3 councillors)
Party	Candidate	Votes	%	±%
Liberal Democrats	Clive Bennett *	2,582	44.2	
Liberal Democrats	Brian Palmer *	2,197	37.6	
Liberal Democrats	Roger Giess *	2,031	34.8	
Labour	Catherine Harvey	1,948	33.4	
Labour	Henry Fergusson	1,904	32.6	
Labour	Richard Payne	1,689	28.9	
Conservative	Benjamin Everitt	1,099	18.8	
Conservative	Wendy Newall	977	16.7	
Conservative	Alastair Hamilton	948	16.2	
Green	Rebecca Findlay	603	10.3	
Green	Ahmed Ibrahim	328	5.6	
Green	Michael Mullins	288	4.9	
Total votes		5,840	55.8	
Liberal Democrats hold		Swing		
Liberal Democrats hold		Swing		
Liberal Democrats hold		Swing		

=== Stockwell ===
Stockwell (3 councillors)
Party	Candidate	Votes	%	±%
Labour	Peter Bowyer *	2,701	48.3	
Labour	Alex Bigham	2,551	45.6	
Labour	Imogen Walker *	2,470	44.2	
Liberal Democrats	Fernanda Correia-Sefzick	1,768	31.6	
Liberal Democrats	Anthony Bottrall	1,765	31.6	
Liberal Democrats	Felix Greaves	1,407	25.2	
Conservative	Sarah Barr	944	16.9	
Conservative	Larissa Dudley	755	13.5	
Conservative	Robert McMillan	712	12.7	
Green	Teresa Delaney	432	7.7	
Green	Rebecca Gibbs	358	6.4	
Green	Robert Foxcroft	313	5.6	
English Democrat	Janus Polenceus	60	1.1	
Total votes		5,593	54.7	
Labour hold		Swing		
Labour hold		Swing		
Labour hold		Swing		

=== Streatham Hill ===
Streatham Hill (3 councillors)
Party	Candidate	Votes	%	±%
Liberal Democrats	Jeremy Clyne *	2,448	39.5	
Liberal Democrats	Ashley Lumsden *	2,426	39.1	
Liberal Democrats	Carita Ogden	2,198	35.5	
Labour	Anne Marie Waters	2,001	32.3	
Labour	Clarence Thompson	1,957	31.6	
Labour	Jack Holborn	1,948	31.4	
Conservative	Elaine Bailey	1,001	16.2	
Conservative	Phillip Henwood	857	13.8	
Conservative	Peter Younghusband	796	12.8	
Green	Catherine Potter	566	9.1	
Green	Martin Wright	535	8.6	
Green	Shelagh Webb	458	7.4	
Independent	June Fewtrell *	393	6.3	
Total votes		6,197	58.3	
Liberal Democrats hold		Swing		
Liberal Democrats hold		Swing		
Liberal Democrats hold		Swing		

=== Streatham South ===
Streatham South (3 councillors)
Party	Candidate	Votes	%	±%
Labour	Mark Bennett *	2,882	48.9	
Labour	Dave Malley *	2,882	48.9	
Labour	John Kazantzis *	2,733	46.4	
Liberal Democrats	Ahmad Ali	1,720	29.2	
Liberal Democrats	Karen Davies-Morfey	1,696	28.8	
Liberal Democrats	Michael Morfey	1,569	26.6	
Conservative	Helen Smith	942	16.0	
Conservative	David McInnes	849	14.4	
Conservative	Andrew Williams	817	13.9	
Green	Elizabeth Davidson	256	4.4	
Green	Yolanda Dolling	251	4.3	
Green	Emma Hinkson	245	4.2	
Total votes		5,889	59.2	
Labour hold		Swing		
Labour hold		Swing		
Labour hold		Swing		

=== Streatham Wells ===
Streatham Wells (3 councillors)
Party	Candidate	Votes	%	±%
Liberal Democrats	Judith Best	2,478	42.4	
Liberal Democrats	Alexander Davies	2,412	41.3	
Liberal Democrats	Daphne Marchant *	2,316	39.6	
Labour	Malcolm Clark	2,064	35.3	
Labour	Laura Webster	2,054	35.2	
Labour	Clair Wilcox	1,874	32.1	
Conservative	Stanley Davies	853	14.6	
Conservative	Lisabeth Liell	766	13.1	
Conservative	Teresa Tunstall	764	13.1	
Green	Matthew Carter	385	6.6	
Green	Rachel Braverman	371	6.4	
Green	Magda Devas	344	5.9	
Total votes		5,842	56.1	
Liberal Democrats hold		Swing		
Liberal Democrats hold		Swing		
Liberal Democrats hold		Swing		

=== Thornton ===
Thornton (3 councillors)
Party	Candidate	Votes	%	±%
Labour	Diana Morris *	2,614	43.9	
Labour	Lib Peck *	2,609	43.8	
Labour	Edward Davie	2,399	40.3	
Liberal Democrats	John Pindar	1,705	28.6	
Liberal Democrats	Christopher Keating	1,670	28.1	
Liberal Democrats	Andrew Waterman	1,383	23.2	
Conservative	Melanie Ball	1,188	20.0	
Conservative	Simon Hemsley	1,104	18.5	
Conservative	Vernon de Maynard	1,004	16.9	
Green	Adrian Audsley	504	8.5	
Green	Charles Gay	373	6.3	
Green	Helen Kersley	311	5.2	
Total votes		5,953	62.7	
Labour hold		Swing		
Labour hold		Swing		
Labour hold		Swing		

=== Thurlow Park ===
Thurlow Park (3 councillors)
Party	Candidate	Votes	%	±%
Conservative	John Whelan *	2,452	38.4	
Labour	Ann Kingsbury	2,035	31.9	
Conservative	Clare Whelan *	2,023	31.7	
Labour	Robert Holden	1,945	30.5	
Conservative	Irene Kimm *	1,906	29.9	
Labour	Brian Cowie	1,888	29.6	
Liberal Democrats	Richard Bramwell	1,516	23.7	
Liberal Democrats	Dominic Carman	1,447	22.7	
Liberal Democrats	Andrew Thurburn	1,447	22.7	
Green	William Collins	781	12.2	
Green	Samarajit Roy	609	9.5	
Green	Dale Mathers	595	9.3	
UKIP	Robin Lambert	178	2.8	
Total votes		6,385	65.1	
Conservative hold		Swing		
Labour gain from Conservative		Swing		
Conservative hold		Swing		

=== Tulse Hill ===
Tulse Hill (3 councillors)
Party	Candidate	Votes	%	±%
Labour	Marcia Cameron *	3,232	49.5	
Labour	Adedamola Aminu *	3,186	48.8	
Labour	Toren Smith *	3,160	48.4	
Liberal Democrats	Oliver Clifford-Mobley	1,764	27.0	
Liberal Democrats	Nicholas Wright	1,748	26.8	
Liberal Democrats	Lule Tekeste	1,668	25.5	
Green	Bernard Atwell	759	11.6	
Green	Kate Whitehead	698	10.7	
Green	Jane Hersey	656	10.0	
Conservative	Hugh Bennett	608	9.3	
Conservative	Joanna Hindley	556	8.5	
Conservative	Gail Thompson	503	7.7	
Total votes		6,532	58.6	
Labour hold		Swing		
Labour hold		Swing		
Labour hold		Swing		

=== Vassall ===
Vassall (3 councillors)
Party	Candidate	Votes	%	±%
Labour	Kingsley Abrams *	2,533	44.5	
Labour	Adrian Garden	2,308	40.6	
Liberal Democrats	Steve Bradley *	2,193	38.6	
Labour	Tracy Ritson	2,146	37.7	
Liberal Democrats	Faye Gray	1,793	31.5	
Liberal Democrats	Matthew Hanney	1,617	28.4	
Conservative	Stuart Barr	706	12.4	
Conservative	Andrew Hayes	593	10.4	
Green	Alexandra Olive	542	9.5	
Conservative	Carolena Ludwig	525	9.2	
Green	Stephen Hall	477	8.4	
Green	Peter Cutler	476	8.4	
Total votes		5,686	55.7	
Labour hold		Swing		
Labour hold		Swing		
Liberal Democrats hold		Swing		
