= Clapham and Brixton Hill =

UK Parliament constituency (since 2024)

- Borough constituency for the House of Commons
- Interactive map of boundaries from 2024
- Boundary of Clapham and Brixton Hill in Greater London
- County: Greater London
- Electorate: 75,460 (March 2020)

Current constituency
- Created: 2024
- Member of Parliament: Bell Ribeiro-Addy (Labour)
- Seats: One
- Created from: Streatham & Vauxhall

Clapham and Brixton Hill is a constituency in Greater London represented in the House of Commons of the UK Parliament. Further to the completion of the 2023 review of Westminster constituencies, it was first contested at the 2024 general election. Its Member of Parliament (MP) is Bell Ribeiro-Addy of the Labour Party, who first won the now-former seat of Streatham in 2019.

== Boundaries ==
The constituency is defined as comprising the following wards of the London Borough of Lambeth, as they existed on 1 December 2020:

- Brixton Hill, Clapham Common, Thornton, and Tulse Hill, transferred from the abolished constituency of Streatham
- Clapham Town, Ferndale and Larkhall, transferred from the abolished constituency of Vauxhall

Following a local government boundary review in the Borough of Lambeth which came into effect in May 2022, the constituency now comprises the following from the 2024 general election:

- The London Borough of Lambeth wards of: Brixton Acre Lane; Brixton North (majority); Brixton Rush Common (nearly all); Clapham Common and Abbeville; Clapham East; Clapham Park (nearly all); Clapham Town; St Martin's (part); Stockwell East (part); Stockwell West and Larkhall (part); Streatham Hill West and Thornton (majority); and a very small part of West Dulwich.

== Constituency profile ==
It was reported in 2023 that, based on 2021 census data, approximately 10% of the over-16 population of the predecessor constituency of Vauxhall identified as "lesbian, gay, bisexual or another sexual orientation" (other than heterosexual), the third-highest percentage of any constituency in the UK. In comparison, Clapham and Brixton Hill is reported (based on the same census data) to have a percentage of 8.4% of people over 16 identifying as having a non-heterosexual sexual orientation, consisting of 5.5% identifying as gay or lesbian, 2.3% identifying as bisexual and 0.6% identifying as having another sexual orientation.

The area has a rich ethnic diversity, with a significant proportion of Black Caribbean and Black African residents. In Brixton Hill, 6% identify as Black Caribbean and 4% as Black African.

The constituency has a relatively young population, with a significant number of residents in their 20s and 30s.

The constituency encompasses several wards within the London Borough of Lambeth. These wards are represented by a total of 18 elected councillors. 16 of which are from the Labour Party and the other two from the Liberal Democrats.

== Elections ==
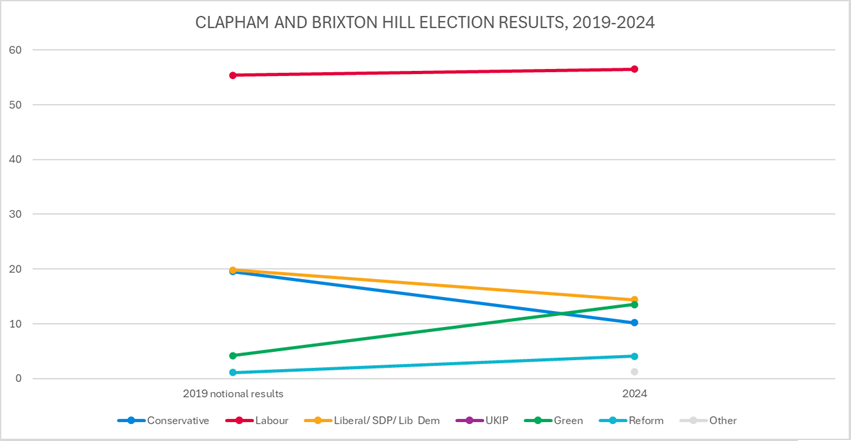
Election results 2019–2024

=== Elections in the 2020s ===
General election 2024: Clapham and Brixton Hill
Party	Candidate	Votes	%	±%
Labour	Bell Ribeiro-Addy	24,166	56.5	▲1.1
Liberal Democrats	Ben Curtis	6,161	14.4	▼5.4
Green	Shâo-Lan Yuen	5,768	13.5	▲9.3
Conservative	Asha Saroy	4,360	10.2	▼9.3
Reform	Mark Matlock	1,758	4.1	▲3.0
Independent	Jon Key	406	0.9	N/A
Socialist (GB)	Bill Martin	122	0.3	N/A
Majority		18,005	42.1	▲6.5
Turnout		42,741	57.4	▼7.0
Registered electors		74,435		
Labour hold		Swing	▲3.2	

=== 2019 notional result ===
2019 notional result
Party	Vote	%
Labour	26,924	55.4
Liberal Democrats	9,633	19.8
Conservative	9,481	19.5
Green	2,045	4.2
Brexit Party	549	1.1
Turnout	48,632	64.4
Electorate	75,460	
