= 2022 Lambeth London Borough Council election =

2022 English local government election

- 5 May 2022

All 63 seats to Lambeth London Borough Council 32 seats needed for a majority
- Registered: 226,899
- Turnout: 71,925; 31.7% (▼2.6%)
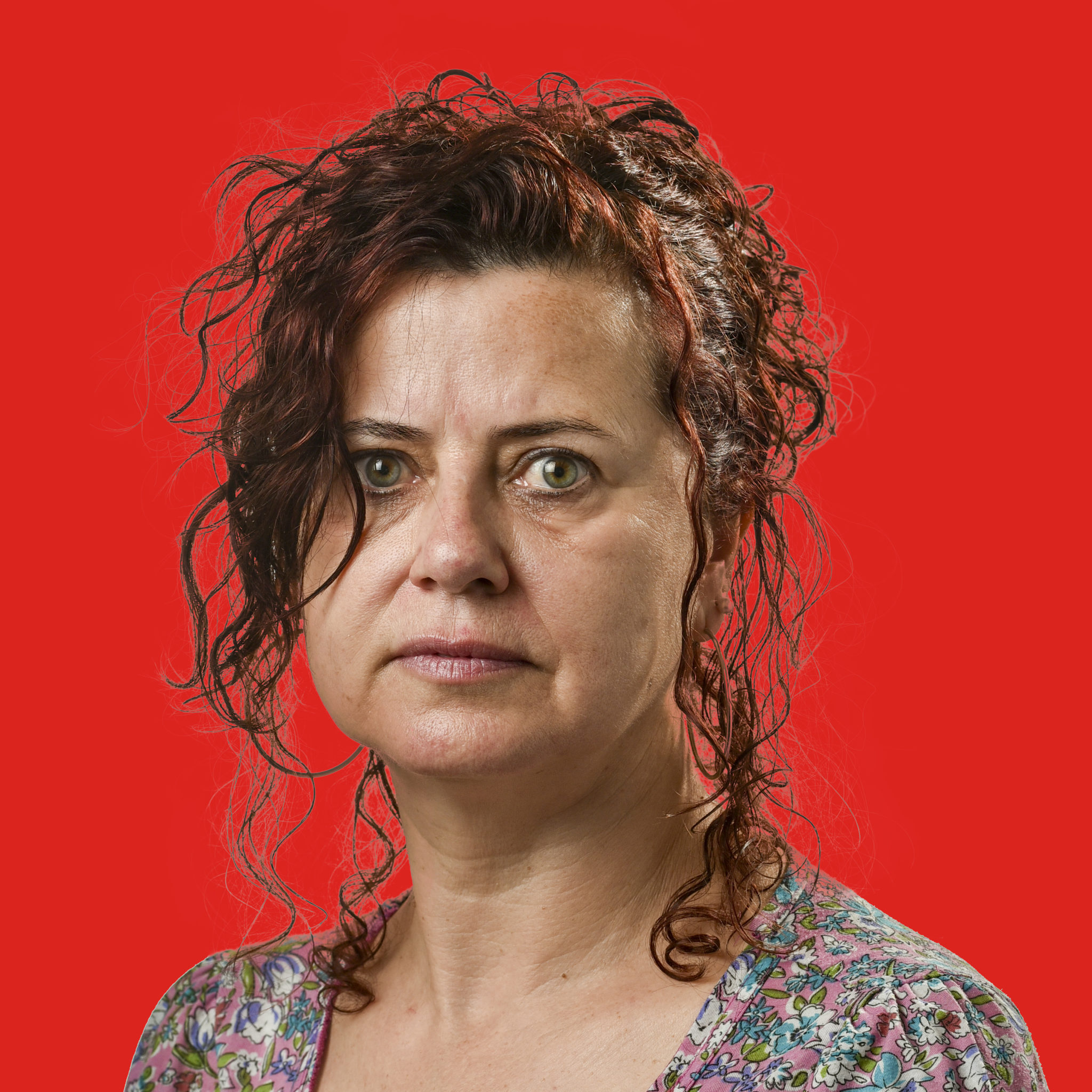

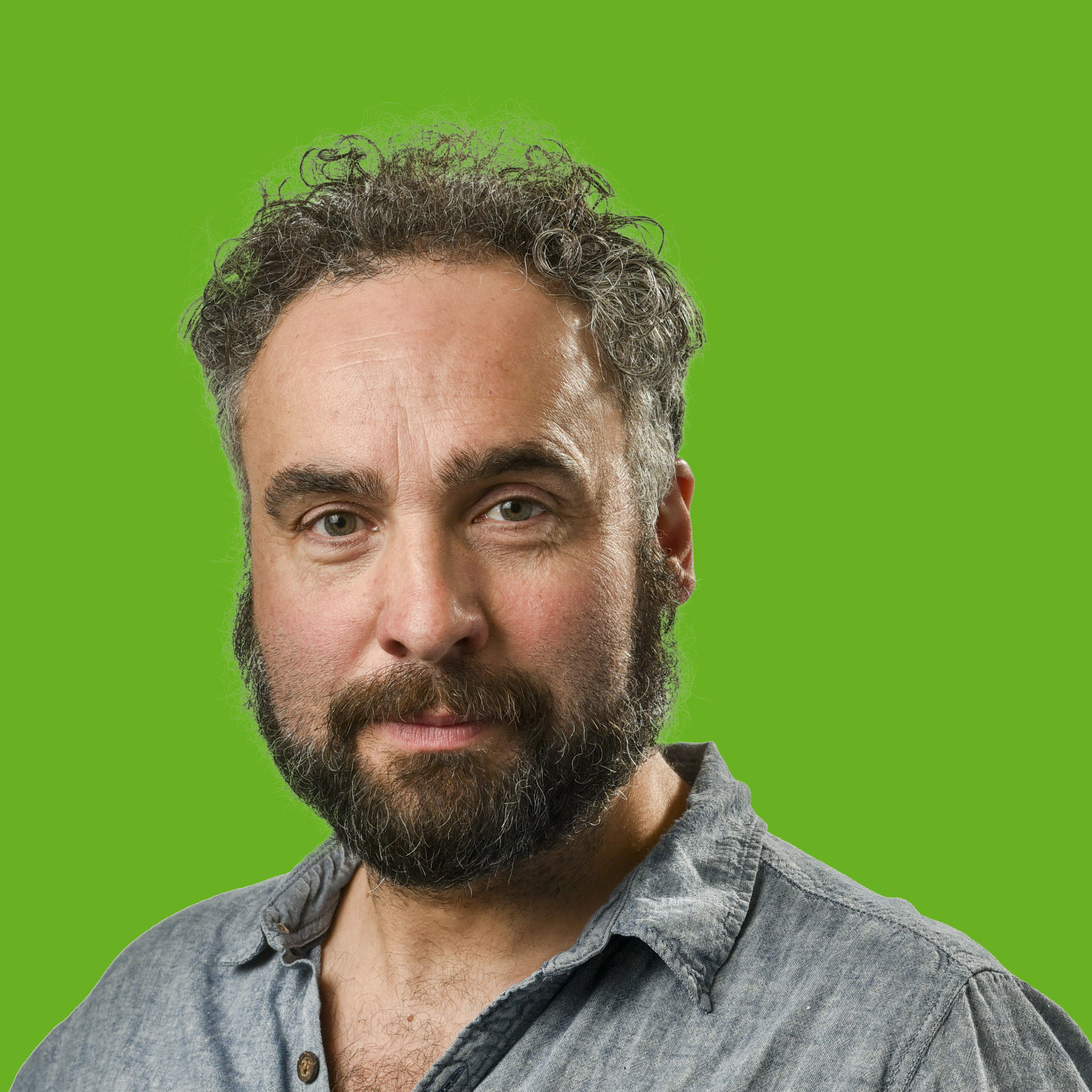

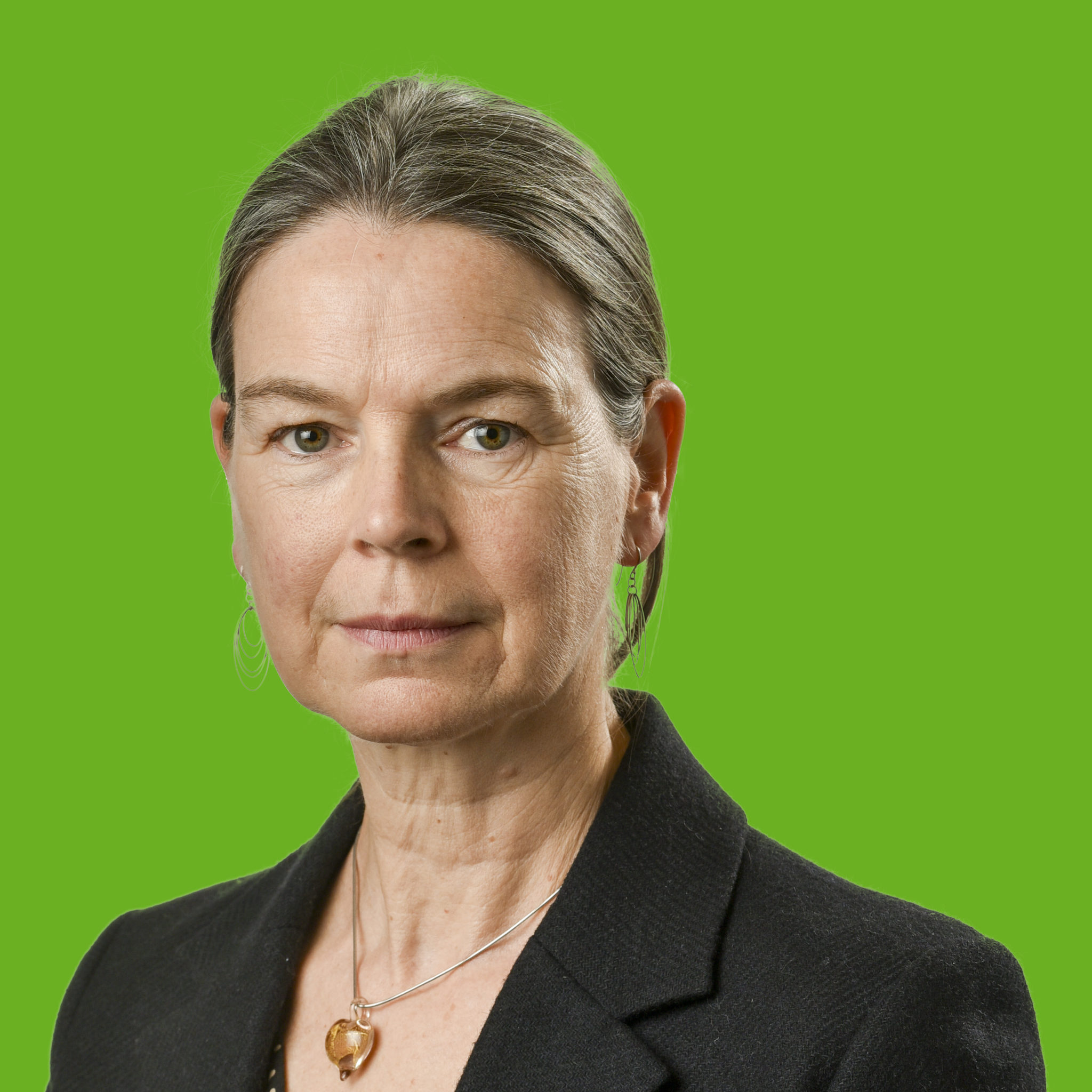
	First party	Second party
		Lib
Leader	Claire Holland	Donna Harris
Party	Labour	Liberal Democrats
Leader's seat	Oval	Streatham Hill West and Thornton
Last election	57 seats, 51.7%	0 seats, 12.8%
Seats won	58	3
Seat change	▲1	▲3
Popular vote	97,727	20,584
Percentage	54.2%	11.4%
Swing	▼0.2pp	▼0.6pp
	Third party	Fourth party
		Con
Leader	Scott Ainslie and Nicole Griffiths	Tim Briggs
Party	Green	Conservative
Leader's seat	Streatham St Leonard's	Clapham Common and Abbeville (defeated)
Last election	5 seats, 19.3%	1 seat, 12.6%
Seats won	2	0
Seat change	▼3	▼1
Popular vote	39,955	21,406
Percentage	22.1%	11.9%
Swing	▲3.2pp	▼1.0pp
- Map of the results of the 2022 Lambeth council election. Greens in green, Labour in red and Liberal Democrats in orange.
Leader before election
Claire Holland
Labour
Leader after election
Claire Holland
Labour

The 2022 Lambeth London Borough Council election took place on 5 May 2022. All 63 members of Lambeth London Borough Council were elected. The elections took place alongside local elections in the other London boroughs and elections to local authorities across the United Kingdom.

In the previous election in 2018, the Labour Party maintained its control of the council, winning 57 out of the 63 seats with the Green Party forming the principal opposition with five of the remaining six seats. The 2022 election took take place under new election boundaries, with the number of councillors remaining the same.

Labour held control of the council, winning 58 seats. The Liberal Democrats overtook the Greens as the second-largest group, winning three seats, becoming the official opposition. It also marked the first time that Liberal Democrat councillors had been elected to the council since 2010. The Conservatives lost its lone seat meaning that for the first time since the Council's founding in 1964, it had no Conservative councillors.

== Background ==
=== History ===
The thirty-two London boroughs were established in 1965 by the London Government Act 1963. They are the principal authorities in Greater London and have responsibilities including education, housing, planning, highways, social services, libraries, recreation, waste, environmental health and revenue collection. Some of the powers are shared with the Greater London Authority, which also manages passenger transport, police and fire.

Since its formation, Lambeth has generally been under Labour control apart from one period from 1968 to 1971 of Conservative control and several periods of no overall control. The council was controlled by a Liberal Democrat-Conservative coalition from 2002 to 2006, and since 2006 has continuously had a Labour majority. The Green Party won their first seat in the 2006 election, which they lost in the 2010 election. The Green Party regained their seat in the 2014 election, while the Liberal Democrats lost all their representation. In the most recent election in 2018, Labour won 57 seats with 51.7% of the vote across the borough, the Greens won five seats with 19.3% of the vote, and the Conservatives won a single seat with 12.6% of the vote. The Liberal Democrats received 12.3% of the vote but didn't win any seats.

=== Council term ===
A Labour councillor for Coldharbour, Matt Parr, died in July 2018. A by-election to fill his seat was held on 13 September 2018, which was won by the Labour candidate Scarlett O'Hara. A Labour councillor for Thornton, Jane Edbrooke, resigned in early 2019 to take up a politically restricted job. The by-election was won by the Labour candidate Stephen Donnelly while the Liberal Democrats gained vote share to come in a strong second place. Another councillor for Thornton, Lib Peck, resigned shortly after to take up a role working for the Mayor of London, Sadiq Khan. Labour held the resulting by-election in April 2019 with candidate Nanda Manley-Browne, with the Liberal Democrats making further gains, reducing the Labour majority to nineteen votes. Labour councillor for Oval, Philip Normal, resigned in January 2022 after historic racist and sexist tweets were uncovered on his Twitter account. In February 2022, Labour councillor for Clapham Town, Christopher Wellbelove resigned due to his new job as Deputy-Lieutenant for Greater London.

As with most London boroughs, Lambeth was electing its councillors under new boundaries decided by the Local Government Boundary Commission for England, which it produced after a period of consultation. The number of councillors remained at 63, under new boundaries with thirteen three-councillor wards and twelve two-councillor wards.

== Electoral process ==
Lambeth, like other London borough councils, elects all of its councillors at once every four years. The previous election took place in 2018. The election took place by multi-member first-past-the-post voting, with each ward being represented by two or three councillors (depending on the number of electors). Electors had as many votes as there are councillors to be elected in their ward, with the top two or three being elected.

All registered electors (British, Irish, Commonwealth and European Union citizens) living in London aged 18 or over were entitled to vote in the election. People who lived at two addresses in different councils, such as university students with different term-time and holiday addresses, were entitled to be registered for and vote in elections in both local authorities. Voting in-person at polling stations took place from 7:00 to 22:00 on election day, and voters were able to apply for postal votes or proxy votes in advance of the election.

== Council composition ==
Council composition after the 2018 election

Council composition ahead of the 2022 election

Council composition after the 2022 election

After 2018 election		Before 2022 election		After 2022 election	
Party	Seats	Party	Seats	Party	Seats
Labour	57	Labour	55	Labour	58
Liberal Democrats	0	Liberal Democrats	0	Liberal Democrats	3
Green	5	Green	5	Green	2
Conservative	1	Conservative	1	Conservative	0

== Election result ==
2022 Lambeth London Borough Council election
Party	Candidates	Seats	Gains	Losses	Net gain/loss	Seats %	Votes %	Votes	+/−
Labour	63	58	N/A	N/A	▲1	92.1	54.2	97,727	–0.2
Liberal Democrats	60	3	N/A	N/A	▲3	4.8	11.4	20,584	–0.6
Green	62	2	N/A	N/A	▼3	3.2	22.1	39,955	+3.2
Conservative	63	0	N/A	N/A	▼1	0.0	11.9	21,406	–1.0
Women's Equality	1	0	N/A	N/A	Steady	0.0	0.2	365	–0.5
TUSC	5	0	N/A	N/A	Steady	0.0	0.2	319	+0.2
Socialist (GB)	1	0	N/A	N/A	Steady	0.0	<0.1	31	N/A
Reform	1	0	N/A	N/A	Steady	0.0	<0.1	23	N/A

Council composition following the election in May 2022:

↓
58	3	2
Labour	Lib Dems	Green

== Ward results ==
Candidates shown below are confirmed candidates. Incumbent councillors standing for re-election are marked with an asterisk (*).

=== Brixton Acre Lane ===
Maria Kay was a sitting councillor for Brixton Hill ward.

Brixton Acre Lane (3 seats)
Party	Candidate	Votes	%
Labour Co-op	Maria Kay*	1,812	57.5
Labour Co-op	David Bridson	1,751	55.6
Labour Co-op	Sarbaz Barznji	1,747	55.4
Green	Katy Martin	805	25.5
Green	William Eaves	568	18.0
Green	Dan Red	510	16.2
Women's Equality	Janet Baker	365	11.6
Conservative	Shirley Cosgrave	346	11.0
Conservative	Abidemi Babalola	339	10.8
Liberal Democrats	Heather Glass	327	10.4
Conservative	Vernon de Maynard	322	10.2
Liberal Democrats	Joanna Pycroft	251	8.0
Liberal Democrats	Charles Jenkins	234	7.4
TUSC	Theo Sharieff	78	2.5
Turnout		3,271	29.4
Registered electors		11,136	
Labour Co-op win (new seat)			
Labour Co-op win (new seat)			
Labour Co-op win (new seat)			

=== Brixton North ===
Nanda Manley-Browne was a sitting councillor for Thornton ward.

Brixton North (3 seats)
Party	Candidate	Votes	%
Labour Co-op	Nanda Manley-Browne*	1,855	67.4
Labour Co-op	James Bryan	1,813	65.9
Labour Co-op	John-Paul Ennis	1,709	62.1
Green	Nadine Brown	695	25.3
Green	Charlie Button	531	19.3
Green	Neil Sheppeck	469	17.1
Conservative	Frederick Ellery	220	8.0
Liberal Democrats	Poppy Hasted	213	7.7
Conservative	Katherine Sloggett	212	7.7
Conservative	Lewis Leach	203	7.4
Liberal Democrats	Jing Tang	196	7.1
Liberal Democrats	Ian Tedder	136	4.9
Turnout		2,869	25.8
Registered electors		11,113	
Labour Co-op win (new seat)			
Labour Co-op win (new seat)			
Labour Co-op win (new seat)			

=== Brixton Rush Common ===
Marcia Cameron and Ben Kind were sitting councillors for Tulse Hill ward. Adrian Garden was a sitting councillor for Brixton Hill ward.

Brixton Rush Common (3 seats)
Party	Candidate	Votes	%
Labour	Marcia Cameron*	2,070	65.4
Labour	Ben Kind*	1,902	60.1
Labour	Adrian Garden*	1,779	56.2
Green	Zana Dean	928	29.3
Green	Laura Vroomen	769	24.3
Green	Janell English	654	20.7
Liberal Democrats	Abbi Alsalmi	285	9.0
Liberal Democrats	Ben Austin	278	8.8
Liberal Democrats	Paul Medlicott	215	6.8
Conservative	Lisabeth Liell	212	6.7
Conservative	Valerio Ficcadenti	210	6.6
Conservative	Colin Watkins	198	6.3
Turnout		3,306	30.9
Registered electors		10,697	
Labour win (new seat)			
Labour win (new seat)			
Labour win (new seat)			

=== Brixton Windrush ===
Donatus Anyanwu and Scarlett O'Hara were sitting councillors for Coldharbour ward. Becca Thackray was a sitting councillor for Herne Hill ward.

Brixton Windrush (2 seats)
Party	Candidate	Votes	%
Labour Co-op	Scarlett O'Hara*	1,143	63.1
Labour Co-op	Donatus Anyanwu*	1,114	61.5
Green	Becca Thackray*	572	31.6
Green	Tom Wood	384	21.2
Liberal Democrats	Alex Haylett	112	6.2
Liberal Democrats	Florence Cyrot	101	5.6
Conservative	Sarah Roberts	100	5.5
Conservative	Kelly Ben-Maimon	94	5.2
Turnout		1,858	27.0
Registered electors		6,885	
Labour Co-op win (new seat)			
Labour Co-op win (new seat)			

=== Clapham Common & Abbeville ===
Tim Briggs and Joanna Reynolds were sitting councillors for Clapham Common ward.

Clapham Common & Abbeville (2 seats)
Party	Candidate	Votes	%
Liberal Democrats	Ben Curtis	1,006	35.3
Labour	Alison Inglis-Jones	926	32.5
Labour	Joanna Reynolds*	916	32.1
Liberal Democrats	Fereed Alderechi	885	31.0
Conservative	Tim Briggs*	782	27.4
Conservative	David Frost	686	24.1
Green	Fran Cavanagh	256	9.0
Green	Karen Hautz	221	7.8
Reform	Edward Cole	23	0.8
Turnout		2,908	39.2
Registered electors		7,419	
Liberal Democrats win (new seat)			
Labour win (new seat)			

=== Clapham East ===
Jess Leigh was a sitting councillor for Ferndale ward.

Clapham East (2 seats)
Party	Candidate	Votes	%
Labour Co-op	Jess Leigh*	1,127	68.1
Labour Co-op	Andrew Collins	1,073	64.8
Green	Nick Hattersley	411	24.8
Liberal Democrats	Iestyn Williams	224	13.5
Conservative	Jake Freeman	215	13.0
Conservative	John Hindson	193	11.7
TUSC	Bobbie Cranney	38	2.3
Socialist (GB)	Daniel Lambert	31	1.9
Turnout		1,744	23.3
Registered electors		7,477	
Labour Co-op win (new seat)			
Labour Co-op win (new seat)			

=== Clapham Park ===
Irfan Mohammed was a sitting councillor for Ferndale ward. Martin Tiedemann was a sitting councillor for Brixton Hill ward.

Clapham Park (3 seats)
Party	Candidate	Votes	%
Labour Co-op	Verity McGivern	1,545	64.6
Labour Co-op	Irfan Mohammed*	1,416	59.2
Labour Co-op	Martin Tiedemann*	1,361	56.9
Green	Joanna Eaves	574	24.0
Green	Cath Potter	424	17.7
Green	Myka-Neil Cooper-Levitan	405	16.9
Conservative	Edward Brushwood	303	12.7
Conservative	Lavinia Cartwright	286	12.0
Liberal Democrats	Anthony Gilmour	239	10.0
Conservative	Martin Read	231	9.7
Liberal Democrats	Thomas Newitt	207	8.7
Liberal Democrats	Henry McMorrow	186	7.8
Turnout		2,497	25.6
Registered electors		9,744	
Labour Co-op win (new seat)			
Labour Co-op win (new seat)			
Labour Co-op win (new seat)			

=== Clapham Town ===
Tim Windle was a sitting councillor for Larkhall ward.

Clapham Town (3 seats)
Party	Candidate	Votes	%	±%
Labour	Linda Bray*	1,779	51.5	−1.6
Labour	David Robson	1,603	46.4	−5.0
Labour	Tim Windle*	1,441	41.7	−9.0
Conservative	Tim Bennett	1,029	29.8	+2.5
Conservative	Lee Roberts	980	28.4	+3.0
Conservative	Marcia de Costa	960	27.8	+3.5
Green	Marion Prideaux	729	21.1	+7.9
Green	John James	540	15.6	+4.6
Liberal Democrats	Julie Fox	485	14.0	+2.9
Green	Kerstin Selander	474	13.7	+6.3
Liberal Democrats	Rodney Ovenden	341	9.9	−1.0
Turnout		3,562	30.7	–2.0
Registered electors		11,604		
Labour hold				
Labour hold				
Labour hold				

=== Gipsy Hill ===
Gipsy Hill (2 seats)
Party	Candidate	Votes	%	±%
Labour	Christine Banton	1,457	51.0	+10.3
Labour	Rebecca Spencer	1,326	46.4	+5.8
Green	Pete Elliott*	1,271	44.5	+6.6
Green	Shamin Nakalembe	1,170	40.9	+3.3
Conservative	James Davis	198	6.9	+1.5
Conservative	Adrian Stones	144	5.0	+0.5
Liberal Democrats	Sarah Dobson	101	3.5	+0.9
Liberal Democrats	Michael Tuffrey	50	1.7	−0.7
Turnout		2,919	37.3	–11.4
Registered electors		7,824		
Labour hold				
Labour hold				

=== Herne Hill & Loughborough Junction ===
Jim Dickson and Pauline George were sitting councillors for Herne Hill ward.

Herne Hill & Loughborough Junction (3 seats)
Party	Candidate	Votes	%
Labour	Jim Dickson*	2,429	52.9
Labour	Pauline George*	2,393	52.1
Labour	Deepak Sardiwal	2,342	51.0
Green	Celeste Hicks	1,838	40.0
Green	Nick Christian	1,818	39.6
Green	Paul Valentine	1,556	33.9
Liberal Democrats	Rob Blackie	264	5.7
Conservative	John White	253	5.5
Conservative	Dick Tooze	251	5.5
Conservative	Andrew Whitten	243	5.3
Liberal Democrats	Charlet Hasted	175	3.8
Liberal Democrats	Jonathan Price	148	3.2
TUSC	Berkay Kartav	71	1.5
Turnout		4,670	41.3
Registered electors		11,301	
Labour win (new seat)			
Labour win (new seat)			
Labour win (new seat)			

=== Kennington ===
David Amos was a sitting councillor for Prince's ward. Jacqueline Dyer was a sitting councillor for Vassall ward.

Kennington (3 seats)
Party	Candidate	Votes	%
Labour	David Amos*	2,241	58.7
Labour	Jacqueline Dyer*	2,195	57.5
Labour	Liam Daley	1,992	52.1
Green	Fawzia Muradali-Kane	884	23.1
Green	Rebecca Pashley	883	23.1
Green	Michael Ball	862	22.6
Liberal Democrats	Vivienne Baines	466	12.2
Conservative	Claire Barker	433	11.3
Liberal Democrats	Malcolm Baines	402	10.5
Conservative	Guy Roberts	375	9.8
Conservative	Robbie Caprari-Sharpe	368	9.6
Liberal Democrats	Timothy Garner	359	9.4
Turnout		3,967	34.2
Registered electors		11,587	
Labour win (new seat)			
Labour win (new seat)			
Labour win (new seat)			

=== Knight's Hill ===
Knight's Hill (3 seats)
Party	Candidate	Votes	%	±%
Labour	Ibtisam Adem	2,317	64.4	−2.0
Labour	Jackie Meldrum*	2,314	64.3	−0.6
Labour	Sonia Winifred*	2,171	60.4	+3.6
Green	Toria Evans	977	27.2	+9.4
Green	Lewis Heather	701	19.5	+5.4
Green	Paul Rocks	538	15.0	+2.7
Conservative	Joyce Chieke	358	10.0	−1.9
Conservative	Luke Hutson	348	9.7	−1.9
Conservative	Anthony Kimm	329	9.1	−0.3
Liberal Democrats	Ishbel Brown	286	8.0	−1.6
Liberal Democrats	Claire Mathys	251	7.0	+0.1
Liberal Democrats	Oliver Moule	201	5.6	−0.8
Turnout		3,707	31.6	–3.0
Registered electors		11,722		
Labour hold				
Labour hold				
Labour hold				

=== Myatt's Fields ===
Paul Gadsby and Anne-Marie Gallop were sitting councillors for Vassall ward.

Myatt's Fields (2 seats)
Party	Candidate	Votes	%
Labour Co-op	Anne-Marie Gallop*	1,421	63.2
Labour Co-op	Paul Gadsby*	1,399	62.2
Green	Dzaier Neil	486	21.6
Green	Sean Walsh	400	17.8
Liberal Democrats	Kate Noble	232	10.3
Conservative	Harvey Chandler	200	8.9
Conservative	James Hallett	182	8.1
Liberal Democrats	Nicolas Gibbon	180	8.0
Turnout		2,342	28.7
Registered electors		8,174	
Labour Co-op win (new seat)			
Labour Co-op win (new seat)			

=== Oval ===
Claire Holland is a sitting councillor for Oval ward since 2014 and Council Leader since May 2021.

Oval (3 seats)
Party	Candidate	Votes	%	±%
Labour	Claire Holland*	1,601	59.8	+10.5
Labour	Diogo Costa	1,545	57.7	+12.0
Labour	Issa Issa	1,447	54.0	+11.2
Green	Pauline McAlpine	576	21.5	+6.7
Green	Denzil Everett	444	16.6	+5.2
Green	Linda Mills	411	15.3	+7.6
Liberal Democrats	Marietta Crichton-Stuart	397	14.8	−15.9
Liberal Democrats	Sarah Lewis	380	14.2	−15.9
Conservative	Keith Best	334	12.5	+1.0
Conservative	Elizabeth Gibson	323	12.1	+0.8
Conservative	Paul Mawdsley	291	10.9	+0.8
Liberal Democrats	John Siraut	286	10.7	−16.1
Turnout		2,783	30.6	–4.0
Registered electors		9,086		
Labour hold				
Labour hold				
Labour hold				

=== St Martin's ===
Saleha Jaffer was previously a councillor for St Leonards ward between 2014 and 2018.

St Martin's (2 seats)
Party	Candidate	Votes	%
Labour Co-op	Olga FitzRoy	1,261	59.9
Labour Co-op	Saleha Jaffer	1,217	57.9
Green	Cato Sandford	462	22.0
Green	Shâo-Lan Yuen	405	19.3
Conservative	Lee Rotherham	230	10.9
Conservative	Arthur Virgo	226	10.7
Liberal Democrats	Terry Curtis	221	10.5
Liberal Democrats	Jackie Harper-Wray	185	8.8
Turnout		2,161	29.9
Registered electors		7,235	
Labour Co-op win (new seat)			
Labour Co-op win (new seat)			

=== Stockwell East ===
Mahamed Hashi was a sitting councillor for Stockwell ward. Tina Valcarcel was a sitting councillor for Larkhall ward.

Stockwell East (2 seats)
Party	Candidate	Votes	%
Labour	Tina Calcarcel*	1,114	53.5
Labour	Mahamed Hashi*	1,087	52.2
Green	Abhishek Agarwal	495	23.8
Green	Vincent Manning	379	18.2
Liberal Democrats	Rachel Lester	311	14.9
Liberal Democrats	Sally Mitton	266	12.8
Conservative	Henrietta Royle	257	12.3
Conservative	Stuart Barr	253	12.2
Turnout		2,162	29.8
Registered electors		7,267	
Labour win (new seat)			
Labour win (new seat)			

=== Stockwell West & Larkhall ===
Joanne Simpson was a sitting councillor for Prince's ward.

Stockwell West & Larkhall (3 seats)
Party	Candidate	Votes	%
Labour	Joe Dharampal-Hornby	1,929	63.1
Labour	Joanne Simpson*	1,895	62.0
Labour	David Oxley	1,749	57.2
Green	Kevin Brown	554	18.1
Conservative	James Bellis	551	18.0
Green	Becki Newell	510	16.7
Green	Alice Playle	354	11.6
Liberal Democrats	Gareth Davison	322	10.5
Conservative	Joshua Forrester	321	10.5
Liberal Democrats	Anna Grundill	321	10.5
Conservative	James Strawson	310	10.1
Liberal Democrats	Celia Thomas	266	8.7
TUSC	Steve Nally	87	2.8
Turnout		3,173	26.9
Registered electors		11,776	
Labour win (new seat)			
Labour win (new seat)			
Labour win (new seat)			

=== Streatham Common & Vale ===
Danny Adilypour was a sitting councillor for Streatham South ward.

Streatham Common & Vale (3 seats)
Party	Candidate	Votes	%
Labour Co-op	Danny Adilypour*	2,071	63.2
Labour Co-op	Henna Shah	1,827	55.7
Labour Co-op	Tom Rutland	1,757	53.6
Green	Dunc Eastoe	575	17.5
Conservative	Charlie Jarrett	561	17.1
Conservative	Christopher Paling	520	15.9
Conservative	Promise Phillips	502	15.3
Green	Florence Pollock	483	14.7
Liberal Democrats	Simon Banfield	466	14.2
Green	Geoffrey Frontier de la Messeliere	418	12.7
Liberal Democrats	Hywel Davies	371	11.3
Liberal Democrats	Duncan Brack	286	8.7
Turnout		3,402	28.6
Registered electors		11,912	
Labour Co-op win (new seat)			
Labour Co-op win (new seat)			
Labour Co-op win (new seat)			

=== Streatham Hill East ===
Liz Atkins and Rezina Chowdhury were sitting councillors for Streatham Hill ward.

Streatham Hill East (2 seats)
Party	Candidate	Votes	%
Labour	Liz Atkins*	1,249	57.9
Labour	Rezina Chowdhury*	1,198	55.5
Green	Rachel Alexander	522	24.2
Green	Leon Maurice-Jones	353	16.4
Conservative	Thomas Gray	315	14.6
Conservative	Neil Salt	285	13.2
Liberal Democrats	Judy Best	227	10.5
Liberal Democrats	Donal Kane	165	7.6
Turnout		2,213	30.8
Registered electors		7,191	
Labour win (new seat)			
Labour win (new seat)			

=== Streatham Hill West & Thornton ===
Ed Davie was a sitting councillor for Thornton ward.

Streatham Hill West & Thornton (2 seats)
Party	Candidate	Votes	%
Liberal Democrats	Matthew Bryant	1,416	43.6
Liberal Democrats	Donna Harris	1,370	42.2
Labour	Ed Davie*	1,349	41.6
Labour	Beverley Randall	1,275	39.3
Green	Adrian Audsley	409	12.6
Green	Peter Johnson	250	7.7
Conservative	Russell Henman	231	7.1
Conservative	Kushal Patel	190	5.9
Turnout		3,323	41.6
Registered electors		7,997	
Liberal Democrats win (new seat)			
Liberal Democrats win (new seat)			

=== Streatham St Leonard's ===
Scott Ainslie and Nicole Griffiths were sitting councillors for St Leonards ward.

Streatham St Leonard's (3 seats)
Party	Candidate	Votes	%
Green	Scott Ainslie*	1,727	48.6
Green	Nicole Griffiths*	1,683	47.4
Labour	Martin Abrams	1,525	42.9
Green	Jonny Dobbs-Grove	1,428	40.2
Labour	Denean Rowe	1,353	38.1
Labour	Umar Qureshi	1,336	37.6
Conservative	Elaine Bailey	337	9.5
Conservative	Claire Collins	312	8.8
Conservative	Russell Newall	290	8.2
Liberal Democrats	Nicholas Davidsom	237	6.7
Liberal Democrats	Gillian Lunnon	227	6.4
Liberal Democrats	Simon Drage	198	5.6
Turnout		3,655	33.8
Registered electors		10,804	
Green win (new seat)			
Green win (new seat)			
Labour win (new seat)			

=== Streatham Wells ===
Streatham Wells (2 seats)
Party	Candidate	Votes	%	±%
Labour Co-op	Malcolm Clark*	1,102	49.1	−1.5
Labour Co-op	Marianna Masters*	1,101	49.0	+0.4
Liberal Democrats	Julian Heather	639	28.5	−1.6
Liberal Democrats	Eloka Ikegbunam	502	22.4	−7.3
Green	Clavia Chambers	365	16.3	+3.5
Green	Rachel Miller	309	13.8	+1.3
Conservative	Frazer Dennison	224	10.0	+1.8
Conservative	Wendy Newall	203	9.0	+1.0
TUSC	Candido Rocca	45	2.0	N/A
Turnout		2,323	32.4	–5.5
Registered electors		7,169		
Labour Co-op hold				
Labour Co-op hold				

=== Vauxhall ===
Vauxhall (3 seats)
Party	Candidate	Votes	%
Labour	Martin Bailey	1,025	62.0
Labour	Isla Wrathmell	948	57.4
Labour	Liam Jarnecki	896	54.2
Green	Sheila Freeman	390	23.6
Conservative	Sarah Barr	301	18.2
Conservative	Hugh Bellamy	275	16.6
Conservative	Rolf Merchant	240	14.5
Green	Courtney Kennedy-Sanigar	240	14.5
Green	Keith Hayes	237	14.3
Liberal Democrats	Alexander Davies	214	13.0
Liberal Democrats	Kita Ogden	190	11.5
Turnout		1,729	26.5
Registered electors		6,518	
Labour win (new seat)			
Labour win (new seat)			
Labour win (new seat)			

=== Waterloo & South Bank ===
Ibrahim Dogus was a sitting councillor for Bishop's ward.

Waterloo & South Bank (2 seats)
Party	Candidate	Votes	%
Labour	Sarina da Silva	842	43.3
Labour	Ibrahim Dogus*	781	40.2
Liberal Democrats	Doug Buist	714	36.7
Liberal Democrats	Chris French	713	36.7
Green	Gay Lee	214	11.0
Conservative	Martin Peel	213	11.0
Green	Nicola Smedley	208	10.7
Conservative	Katherine Tack	205	10.5
Turnout		2,003	32.3
Registered electors		6,200	
Labour win (new seat)			
Labour win (new seat)			

=== West Dulwich ===
Fred Cowell was a sitting councillor for Thurlow Park ward.

West Dulwich (2 seats)
Party	Candidate	Votes	%
Labour Co-op	Judith Cavanagh	1,729	52.5
Labour Co-op	Fred Cowell*	1,639	49.8
Conservative	Irene Kimm	689	20.9
Green	Kim Thornton	686	20.8
Conservative	Sharon Turner	616	18.7
Green	Su Opie	565	17.2
Liberal Democrats	Jeremy Baker	332	10.1
Liberal Democrats	Christine Hinton	326	9.9
Turnout		3,378	40.3
Registered electors		8,385	
Labour Co-op win (new seat)			
Labour Co-op win (new seat)			

== Affiliation changes ==
On July 16 2025, Cllr Irfan Mohammed (Clapham Park) was suspended from Labour after being charged with a criminal offences relating to exposure, controlling behaviour and sexual assault. He sits as an independent.

On 28 August 2025, Cllr Martin Abrams (Streatham St Leonard’s) resigned from the Labour Party, sitting temporarily as an independent. On 11 September 2025, he joined the Green Party, making him a Green councillor and making the party the Official Opposition on Lambeth Council.

On 9 November 2025, Cllr Christiana (Tina) Valcarcel (Stockwell East), having been a Labour councillor since 2006, defected to the Liberal Democrats.

== 2022-2026 by-elections ==
=== Vauxhall ===
The by-election took place on 5 October 2023, following the death of Liam Jarnecki.

Vauxhall by-election, 5 October 2023
Party	Candidate	Votes	%	±%
Labour	Tom Swaine-Jameson	595	42.0	▼11.1
Liberal Democrats	Fareed Alderechi	395	27.9	▲16.8
Green	Jacqueline Bond	256	18.1	▼2.1
Conservative	Lee Rotherham	160	11.3	▼4.3
Socialist (GB)	Daniel Lambert	9	0.6	N/A
Majority		200	14.1	
Turnout		1,415	22.5	▼4.1
Labour hold		Swing		

=== Knight’s Hill ===
The by-election was held on 2 May 2024, following the resignation of Sonia Winifred. It took place on the same day as the 2024 London mayoral election, the 2024 London Assembly election and 14 other borough council by-elections across London.

Emma Nye was previously a councillor for Coldharbour ward between 2018 and 2022.

Knight's Hill by-election, 2 May 2024
Party	Candidate	Votes	%	±%
Labour	Emma Nye	2,677	55.5	▼6.8
Green	Victoria Evans	983	20.4	▲0.7
Conservative	Leila Yassen	530	11.0	▲1.5
Liberal Democrats	Nicholas Sanders	378	7.8	▲1.7
Independent	Janet Gayle	210	4.4	N/A
Majority		1,694	35.1	
Turnout		4,826	40.8	▲9.2
Labour hold		Swing		

=== Streatham Common and Vale ===
Streatham Common and Vale by-election, 2 May 2024
Party	Candidate	Votes	%	±%
Labour	Sarah Cole	2,269	49.3	▼9.1
Conservative	Promise Phillips	884	19.2	▲3.3
Green	Duncan Eastoe	784	17.1	▲3.9
Liberal Democrats	Nicholas Davidson	596	13.0	▲1.4
Majority		1,793	30.1	
Turnout		4,594	39.0	▲10.4
Labour hold		Swing		

Streatham Common and Vale by-election, 4 July 2024
Party	Candidate	Votes	%	±%
Labour	Dominic Armstrong	2,796	46.8	▼2.8
Green	Duncan Eastoe	1,354	22.6	▲5.5
Conservative	Lachlan Rurlander	918	15.3	▼3.9
Liberal Democrats	Nicholas Davidson	906	15.1	▲2.1
Majority		1,442	24.2	
Turnout		6,032	50.3	▲21.7
Labour hold		Swing		

=== Herne Hill and Loughborough Junction ===
A by-election took place on 1 May 2025, following the resignation of Jim Dickson.

Herne Hill and Loughborough Junction by-election, 1 May 2025
Party	Candidate	Votes	%	±%
Green	Paul Valentine	1,774	48.3	▲10.5
Labour	Stephen Clark	1,459	39.7	▼10.7
Conservative	Jago Brockway	183	5.0	▼0.2
Reform	Lydia Aitcheson	135	3.7	N/A
Liberal Democrats	Charley Hasted	121	3.3	▼2.1
TUSC	Marco Tessi	30	0.5	▼0.8
Socialist (GB)	Adam Buick	16	0.4	N/A
Majority		315		
Turnout				
Green gain from Labour		Swing		
