= Vauxhall (Lambeth ward) =

Electoral ward in London, England

- Electoral ward for the Lambeth London Borough Council
- Vauxhall ward boundaries since 2022
- Borough: Lambeth
- County: Greater London
- Major settlements: Vauxhall

Current electoral ward
- Created: 2022
- Number of members: 3
- Councillors: Martin Bailey; Isla Wrathmell; Tom Swaine-Jameson
- Created from: Oval and Prince's

Vauxhall is an electoral ward in the London Borough of Lambeth which was first used in the 2022 elections. It returns three councillors to Lambeth London Borough Council.

== List of councillors ==
Term	Councillor	Party
2022–present	Martin Bailey	Labour
2022–present	Isla Wrathmell	Labour
2022–2023	Liam Jarnecki	Labour
2023–present	Tom Swaine-Jameson	Labour

== Lambeth council elections ==
Liam Daley was a councillor for Kennington ward, elected in 2022. Tina Valcarcel was a councillor for Stockwell East ward, elected in 2022.

Vauxhall (3)
Party	Candidate	Votes	%	±%
Green	Jacqueline Bond	653		
Labour	David Ford	580		
Labour	Liam Daley*	572		
Green	Nick Christian	536		
Labour	Denean Rowe	530		
Green	Bernard O'Sullivan	516		
Liberal Democrats	Alistair Leigh	445		
Liberal Democrats	Tina Valcarcel	434		
Liberal Democrats	Joe Wright	382		
Reform	Tony Glover	316		
Conservative	Jamie Tucker	200		
Conservative	Thomas Buckland	195		
Conservative	Simon Hooberman	166		
Turnout		1,915	31.1	
Registered electors		6,156		
Green gain from Labour		Swing		
Labour hold		Swing		
Labour hold		Swing		

=== 2023 by-election ===
The by-election took place on 5 October 2023, following the death of Liam Jarnecki.

2023 Vauxhall by-election
Party	Candidate	Votes	%	±%
Labour	Tom Swaine-Jameson	595	42.0	▼11.1
Liberal Democrats	Fareed Alderechi	395	27.9	▲16.8
Green	Jacqueline Bond	256	18.1	▼2.1
Conservative	Lee Rotherham	160	11.3	▼4.3
Socialist (GB)	Daniel Lambert	9	0.6	N/A
Majority		200	14.1	
Turnout		1,415	22.5	▼4.1
Labour hold		Swing		

=== 2022 election ===
The election took place on 5 May 2022.

2022 Lambeth London Borough Council election: Vauxhall (3)
Party	Candidate	Votes	%	±%
Labour	Martin Bailey	1,025	59.3	
Labour	Isla Wrathmell	948	54.8	
Labour	Liam Jarnecki	896	51.8	
Green	Sheila Freeman	390	22.5	
Conservative	Sarah Barr	301	17.4	
Conservative	Hugh Bellamy	275	15.9	
Conservative	Rolf Merchant	240	13.8	
Green	Courtney Kennedy-Sanigar	240	13.8	
Green	Keith Hayes	237	13.7	
Liberal Democrats	Alexander Davies	214	12.4	
Liberal Democrats	Kita Ogden	190	11.0	
Turnout		1,729	26.5	
Labour win (new boundaries)				
Labour win (new boundaries)				
Labour win (new boundaries)				
