= Michael Chessum =

British politician

Councillor Michael Chessum

Member of Lambeth London Borough Council for Brixton Acre Lane
- Incumbent
- Assumed office 11 May 2026
- Preceded by: Sarbaz Barznji (Labour)

Personal details
- Born: 1989 (age 36–37)
- Party: Green Party of England and Wales (2025–present)
- Other political affiliations: Labour (2012–2025)
- Occupation: Politician; journalist

Michael Chessum (born 1989) is a British politician and journalist who has served as councillor for Brixton Acre Lane ward in Lambeth London Borough Council for the Green Party since May 2026.

== Political career ==
Chessum was a student activist in the 2010 United Kingdom student protests, and co-founded the National Campaign Against Fees and Cuts.

=== Labour Party ===
He joined the Labour Party in 2012, and was the treasurer of Momentum from 2016 to 2017. He opposed Momentum's decision to require its members to join the Labour Party in 2017. Chessum was a speechwriter for Jeremy Corbyn. He was a leading member of the pro-EU campaign group Another Europe Is Possible, which sought to pressure the leadership of the Labour party to oppose Brexit in 2018. In 2019, Momentum was fined £900 by the Electoral Commission due to Chessum failing to report a donation by the legal deadline for doing so. Chessum wrote that he "stopped attending my local Labour left group because the atmosphere had become so toxic, and my position on Brexit made me a figure of genuine hate".

=== Green Party of England and Wales ===
On 16 June 2025, Chessum left the Labour Party and joined the Green Party of England and Wales, in response to Zack Polanski's leadership bid in the 2025 Green Party leadership election. He was elected as a councillor for Brixton Acre Lane ward in the 2026 Lambeth London Borough Council election.

== Journalism career ==
Chessum has written articles for The Guardian.

== Publications ==
- This is Only the Beginning: The Making of a New Left, From Anti-Austerity to the Fall of Corbyn. Bloomsbury Publishing. 2025. ISBN 978-1350464841.
