= Kennington (ward) =

Electoral ward in the London Borough of Lambeth, England

- Electoral ward for the Lambeth London Borough Council
- Kennington ward boundaries since 2022
- Borough: Lambeth
- County: Greater London
- Population: 14,603 (2021) (Note: 2021 Census data reported for 2022 ward boundaries)
- Electorate: 11,572 (2022)
- Major settlements: Kennington
- Area: 1.002 square kilometres (0.387 sq mi)

Current electoral ward
- Created: 2022
- Councillors: 3
- Created from: Bishop's, Oval and Prince's
- GSS code: E05014105

Kennington is an electoral ward in the London Borough of Lambeth. The ward was first used in the 2022 elections. It returns three councillors to Lambeth London Borough Council.

== List of councillors ==
Term	Councillor	Party
2022–present	David Amos	Labour
2022–present	Jacqueline Dyer	Labour
2022–present	Liam Daley	Labour

== Lambeth council elections ==
=== 2022 election ===
The election took place on 5 May 2022.

2022 Lambeth London Borough Council election: Kennington (3)
Party	Candidate	Votes	%	±%
Labour	David Amos	2,241	58.7	
Labour	Jacqueline Dyer	2,195	57.5	
Labour	Liam Daley	1,992	52.1	
Green	Fawzia Muradali-Kane	884	23.1	
Green	Rebecca Pashley	883	23.1	
Green	Michael Ball	862	22.6	
Liberal Democrats	Vivienne Baines	466	12.2	
Conservative	Claire Barker	433	11.3	
Liberal Democrats	Malcolm Baines	402	10.5	
Conservative	Guy Roberts	375	9.8	
Conservative	Robbie Caprari-Sharpe	368	9.6	
Liberal Democrats	Timothy Garner	359	9.4	
Turnout		3,967	34.2	
Labour win (new boundaries)				
Labour win (new boundaries)				
Labour win (new boundaries)				
