= Bell Ribeiro-Addy =

British Labour politician (born 1985)

Bell Ribeiro-Addy MP
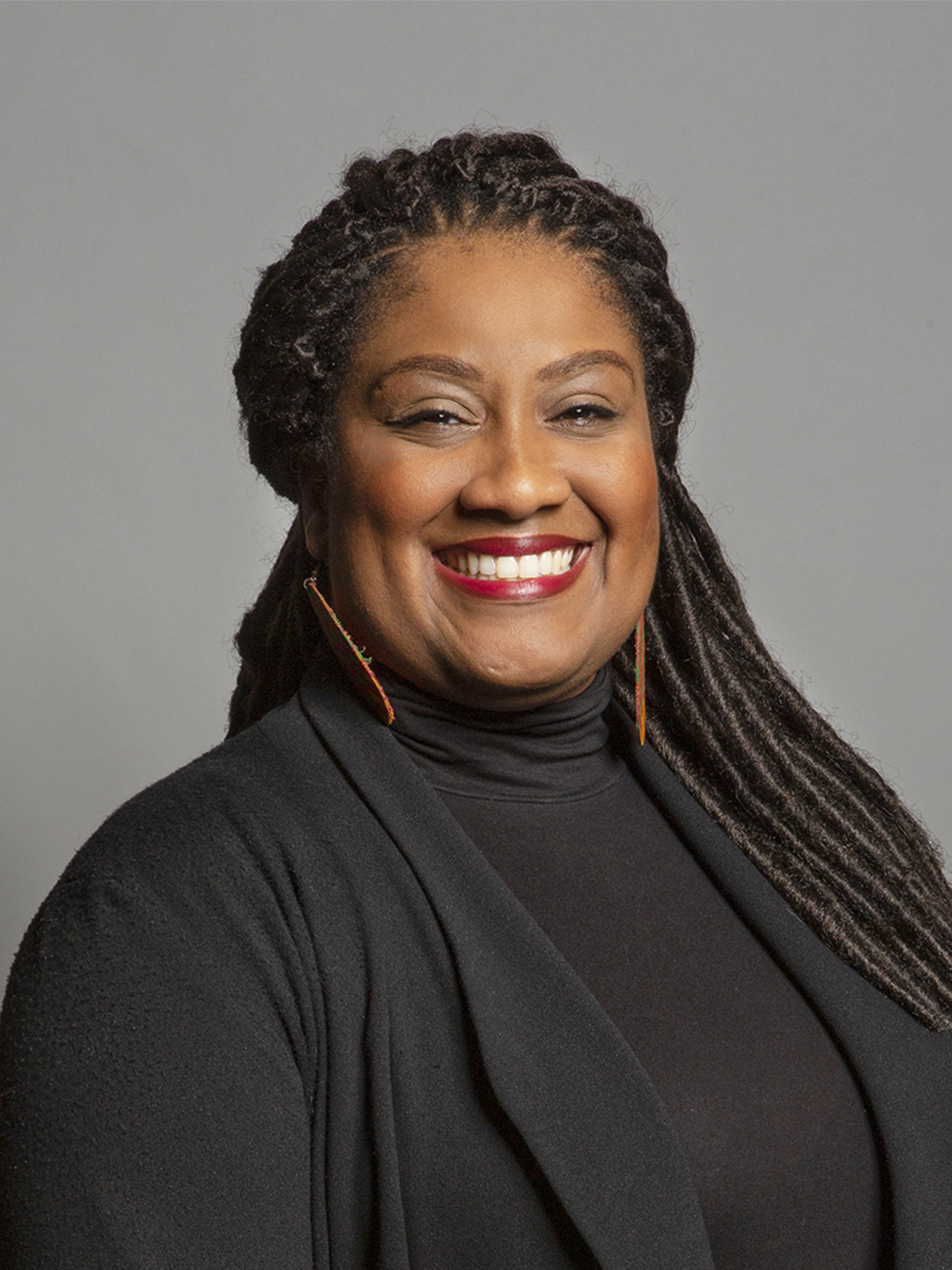
- Official portrait, 2019

Shadow Minister for Immigration
- In office 24 January 2020 – 9 April 2020
- Leader: Jeremy Corbyn
- Preceded by: Afzal Khan
- Succeeded by: Holly Lynch

Member of Parliament for Clapham and Brixton Hill Streatham (2019–2024)
- Incumbent
- Assumed office 12 December 2019
- Preceded by: Chuka Umunna
- Majority: 18,005 (42.1%)

Personal details
- Born: Bellavia Janet Ribeiro-Addy; 1 March 1985 (age 41) Streatham, London, England
- Party: Labour
- Other political affiliations: Socialist Campaign Group (2019–present)
- Education: University of Bradford (BSc); Queen Mary University of London (MA); BPP Law School (GDL)
- Website: Official website

Bellavia Janet Ribeiro-Addy (born 1 March 1985) is a British Labour Party politician who has served as the Member of Parliament (MP) for Clapham and Brixton Hill, previously Streatham, since 2019. In 2020, she was briefly Shadow Minister for Immigration. She chairs the All-Party Parliamentary Group for Afrikan Reparations. On the political left, she is a member of the Socialist Campaign Group.

== Early life and education ==
Bellavia Ribeiro-Addy was born on 1 March 1985 in Streatham, south London, growing up on a council estate on Brixton Hill. She is of Ghanaian descent.

She attended the private Streatham and Clapham High School. Ribeiro-Addy then graduated with a Bachelor of Science degree in Biomedical Science with Ethics & Philosophy of Science from the University of Bradford in 2006. She then completed a Master of Arts degree in Medical Law & Ethics at Queen Mary University of London, awarded in 2007, and a Graduate Diploma in Law at BPP Law School, awarded in 2015.

She was the National Black Students' Officer for the National Union of Students (NUS) from 2008 to 2010, national co-ordinator of the Student Assembly Against Racism, and the national convenor of the NUS' Anti-Racism/Anti-Fascism campaign. In 2010, she and LGBT+ officer Daf Adley pushed the Durham Union Society to cancel a debate on multiculturalism, threatening to bus coaches of students to Durham for a "colossal demonstration" if British National Party MEP Andrew Brons were to speak on campus.

She has described herself as a "Black working-class woman, Christian and lifelong Socialist". Ribeiro-Addy was chief of staff to former Labour frontbencher Diane Abbott from 2016 to 2019.

== Parliamentary career ==
At the 2019 general election, Ribeiro-Addy was elected to Parliament as MP for Streatham with 54.8% of the vote and a majority of 17,690 votes. Ribeiro-Addy in her maiden speech called for some form of reparations to former colonial subjects, and spoke of the injustices faced by black people in Britain. In one of her first news interviews as an MP, she called for the decriminalisation of homosexuality in Ghana, stating that it is her duty to make sure all people are free, and not discriminated against.

In January 2020, Ribeiro-Addy was appointed as Shadow Minister for Immigration, just weeks after her election as a member of parliament. She was not retained in the role following the election of Sir Keir Starmer as Labour leader.

In February 2020, she challenged the role of the media in devaluing black female MPs, particularly regarding errors by BBC Parliament and other outlets involving the mislabelling of photos of black female Labour MPs Marsha de Cordova and Dawn Butler.

During the COVID-19 pandemic, in March 2020, Ribeiro-Addy called on the government to release people held in immigration detention centres.

Ribeiro-Addy supported adopting a zero-COVID strategy to combat the COVID-19 pandemic and wrote an article in June 2021 in support of delaying the lifting of lockdown, criticised a "vaccine only" approach and called for the continuation of restrictions until case numbers reach zero. In December 2021, she voted against the introduction of vaccine passports and mandatory vaccination of NHS staff.

Ribeiro-Addy – whose first UK-born black relative was Thomas Birch Freeman, born in Twyford, Hampshire, in 1809 – has called for better black history education in schools, saying in October 2021: "Our civil rights struggle here in the UK is not one that we learn about as much."

On 24 February 2022, following the 2022 Russian invasion of Ukraine, Ribeiro-Addy was one of 11 Labour MPs threatened with losing the party whip after they signed a statement by the Stop the War Coalition, which questioned the legitimacy of NATO and accused the military alliance of "eastward expansion". All 11 MPs subsequently removed their signatures.

In the 2019–2024 Parliament, she chaired the all-party parliamentary group for Afrikan Reparations. In August 2023, Ribeiro-Addy argued for revision of the British Museum Act 1963, which currently prevents exhibits such as the Benin Bronzes and the Elgin Marbles from being returned to their countries of origin.

Due to the 2023 review of Westminster constituencies, Ribeiro-Addy's constituency of Streatham was abolished, and replaced with Clapham and Brixton Hill. At the 2024 general election, Ribeiro-Addy was elected to Parliament as MP for Clapham and Brixton Hill with 56.5% of the vote and a majority of 18,005.

On 12 December 2024, the Conduct Committee of the House of Lords recommended suspending Baroness Meyer for three weeks for harassment "related to race". This followed a complaint by Ribeiro-Addy (in conjunction with a separate complaint by Lord Dholakia) that she had touched her hair without asking her permission.

On 8 September 2025, she announced her intention to stand in the 2025 Labour Party deputy leadership election, the first MP to do so. However, she obtained 24 nominations, failing to meet the minimum 80 nominations required.

== Personal life ==
Ribeiro-Addy served as a school governor at Saint Gabriel's College, Camberwell, from 2018 to 2022.

She is a Christian.

Parliament of the United Kingdom
| Preceded by Chuka Umunna | Member of Parliament for Streatham; 2019–present | Incumbent |
