= Tulse Hill (ward) =

Coordinates: 51.450°N 0.116°W

- Former electoral ward for the Lambeth London Borough Council
- Tulse Hill ward boundaries from 2002 to 2022
- Borough: Lambeth
- County: Greater London

Former electoral ward
- Created: 1965
- Abolished: 2022
- Member: 3
- Replaced by: Brixton Rush Common; St Martin's
- GSS code: E05000435

Tulse Hill ward was an administrative division of the London Borough of Lambeth, England from 1965 to 2022.

It stretched from Brixton town centre to the South Circular road. The area contains several large housing estates around Tulse Hill, the road, but does not contain Tulse Hill railway station. At the 2011 Census the population of the Ward was 15,771.

== 2002–2022 Lambeth council elections ==
There was a revision of ward boundaries in Lambeth in 2002.

=== 2018 election ===
The election took place on 3 May 2018.

2018 Lambeth London Borough Council election: Tulse Hill
Party	Candidate	Votes	%	±%
Labour	Mary Atkins	2,289		
Labour	Marcia Cameron	2,271		
Labour	Ben Kind	2,102		
Green	Gerlinde Gniewosz	947		
Green	Kate Whitehead	838		
Green	Andy Plant	795		
Liberal Democrats	Matthew Coldrick	318		
Liberal Democrats	Terry Curtis	289		
Conservative	Claire Gardener	280		
Conservative	Ed Gormley	255		
Conservative	Roger Green	235		
Liberal Democrats	Scott Liddle	213		
Turnout				
Labour hold		Swing		
Labour hold		Swing		
Labour hold		Swing		

=== 2014 election ===
The election took place on 22 May 2014.

2014 Lambeth London Borough Council election: Tulse Hill
Party	Candidate	Votes	%	±%
Labour	Mary Atkins	2,276	61.6	
Labour	Adedamola Aminu	2,073		
Labour	Marcia Cameron	2,044		
Green	Elkin Atwell	742	20.1	
Green	Jonathan Chuter	713		
Green	Will Wynter	615		
Conservative	Lavinia Cartwright	305	8.3	
Liberal Democrats	Matthew Coldrick	266	7.2	
Conservative	John White	256		
Conservative	Martin Read	250		
Liberal Democrats	Terry Curtis	242		
Liberal Democrats	John Foster	185		
TUSC	Kieran O'Mant	105	2.8	
TUSC	Marcel Richards	78		
Total votes				
Labour hold		Swing		
Labour hold		Swing		
Labour hold		Swing		

=== 2010 election ===
The election on 6 May 2010 took place on the same day as the United Kingdom general election.

2010 Lambeth London Borough Council election: Tulse Hill
Party	Candidate	Votes	%	±%
Labour	Marcia Cameron	3,232		
Labour	Adedamola Aminu	3,186		
Labour	Toren Smith	3,160		
Liberal Democrats	Oliver Clifford-Mobley	1,764		
Liberal Democrats	Nicholas Wright	1,748		
Liberal Democrats	Lule Tekeste	1,668		
Green	Bernard Atwell	759		
Green	Kate Whitehead	698		
Green	Jane Hersey	656		
Conservative	Hugh Bennett	608		
Conservative	Joanna Hindley	556		
Conservative	Gail Thompson	503		
Total votes		18,538		
Labour hold		Swing		
Labour hold		Swing		
Labour hold		Swing		

=== 2006 election ===
The election took place on 4 May 2006.

2006 Lambeth London Borough Council election: Tulse Hill
Party	Candidate	Votes	%	±%
Labour	Marcia Cameron	1,589	49.0	
Labour	Toren Smith	1,528		
Labour	Adedamola Aminu	1,514		
Green	Bernard Atwell	718	22.1	
Liberal Democrats	James Lucas	582	18.0	
Liberal Democrats	Robert McConnell	432		
Liberal Democrats	Nick Perry	374		
Conservative	Josephine Lomax	353	10.9	
Conservative	Edna Richards	309		
Conservative	Roger Lomax	306		
Total votes		7,705		
Labour hold		Swing		
Labour hold		Swing		
Labour hold		Swing		

=== 2002 election ===
The election took place on 2 May 2002.

2002 Lambeth London Borough Council election: Tulse Hill
Party	Candidate	Votes	%	±%
Labour	Jackie Meldrum	1,219	21.0	
Labour	Tom Franklin	1,078	18.6	
Labour	Toren Smith	1,017	17.6	
Green	John Yates	440	7.6	
Liberal Democrats	Ann Savage	334	5.8	
Green	Keith Hatch	333	5.8	
Liberal Democrats	Roger O'Brien	290	5.0	
Liberal Democrats	Karl Davies	285	4.9	
Conservative	Claire Baker	225	3.9	
Conservative	David Owens	215	3.7	
Conservative	Dan Tweyman	184	3.2	
Socialist Alliance	Gregory Tucker	171	3.0	
Turnout		5,791	21.2	
Labour win (new boundaries)				
Labour win (new boundaries)				
Labour win (new boundaries)				

== 1978–2002 Lambeth council elections ==
There was a revision of ward boundaries in Lambeth in 1978.

== External information ==
- Lambeth Borough Council ward profile
- Tulse Hill ward election results on Lambeth website
- Tulse Labour Councillors website
