= Saint Gabriel's College (school in Camberwell) =

Saint Gabriel's College, Camberwell

Location
- Langton road Lambeth, London; England; 51.4826°N 0.1160°W

Information
- Type: Voluntary aided school
- Religious affiliation: Church of England
- Established: 2012; 14 years ago
- Local authority: Lambeth
- Department for Education URN: 100627 Tables
- Ofsted: Reports
- Chair of Governors: Jane Bevis
- Principal: Nick Butler
- Gender: Co-educational
- Age: 11 to 16
- Colours: Yellow and Black
- Website: http://www.saintgabrielscollege.org/

Saint Gabriel's College is a Church of England co-educational secondary school located in the London Borough of Lambeth.

== History ==
Saint Gabriel's, which developed out of Charles Edward Brooke School, opened as a Specialist Arts and Music College in September 2012. The college moved to its present site in October 2018. The college maintains strong links with the Church. In 2019 the vicar of the Church is serving on the college governing body as the Vice-Chair of Governors.

== Admissions ==
Saint Gabriel's College is an 11-16 voluntary aided, co-educational comprehensive school, part of the educational provision of the Anglican Diocese of Southwark and the London Borough of Lambeth.
