= Streatham Common and Vale =

Electoral ward in London, England

- Electoral ward for the Lambeth London Borough Council
- Streatham Common and Vale ward boundaries since 2022
- Borough: Lambeth
- County: Greater London
- Major settlements: Streatham

Current electoral ward
- Created: 2022
- Number of members: 3
- Councillors: Danny Adilypour; Sarah Cole; Dominic Armstrong

Streatham Common and Vale is an electoral ward in the London Borough of Lambeth. The ward was first used in the 2022 elections. It returns three councillors to Lambeth London Borough Council.

== List of councillors ==
Term	Councillor	Party
2022–present	Danny Adilypour	Labour Co-op
2022–2024	Henna Shah	Labour Co-op
2022–2024	Tom Rutland	Labour Co-op
2024-present	Sarah Cole	Labour
2024-present	Dominic Armstrong	Labour

== Lambeth council elections ==
=== July 2024 by-election ===
The by-election took place on 4 July 2024, on the same day as the 2024 United Kingdom general election. It followed the resignation of Henna Shah.

July 2024 Streatham Common and Vale by-election
Party	Candidate	Votes	%	±%
Labour	Dominic Armstrong	2,796		
Green	Duncan Eastoe	1354		
Conservative	Lachlan Rurlander	918		
Liberal Democrats	Nicholas Davidson	906		
Majority		1,793		
Turnout				
Labour hold		Swing		

=== May 2024 by-election ===
The by-election took place on 2 May 2024, on the same day as the 2024 London mayoral election, the 2024 London Assembly election and 14 other borough council by-elections across London. It followed the resignation of Tom Rutland.

May 2024 Streatham Common and Vale by-election
Party	Candidate	Votes	%	±%
Labour	Sarah Cole	2,269	49.3	▼9.1
Conservative	Promise Phillips	884	19.2	▲3.3
Green	Duncan Eastoe	784	17.1	▲3.9
Liberal Democrats	Nicholas Davidson	596	13.0	▲1.4
Majority		1,793		
Turnout		4,594	39.0	▲10.4
Labour hold		Swing		

=== 2022 election ===
The election took place on 5 May 2022.

2022 Lambeth London Borough Council election: Streatham Common and Vale (3)
Party	Candidate	Votes	%	±%
Labour Co-op	Danny Adilypour *	2,071	63.2	
Labour Co-op	Henna Shah	1,827	55.7	
Labour Co-op	Tom Rutland	1,757	53.6	
Green	Dunc Eastoe	575	17.5	
Conservative	Charley Jarrett	561	17.1	
Conservative	Christopher Paling	520	15.9	
Conservative	Promise Phillips	502	15.3	
Green	Florence Pollock	483	14.7	
Liberal Democrats	Simon Banfield	466	14.2	
Green	Geoffrey Frontier de la Messeliere	418	12.7	
Liberal Democrats	Hywel Davies	371	11.3	
Liberal Democrats	Duncan Brack	286	8.7	
Turnout		3,402	28.6	
Labour Co-op win (new seat)				
Labour Co-op win (new seat)				
Labour Co-op win (new seat)				

*Danny Adilypour was a sitting councillor for Streatham South ward.
