= Brixton Hill (ward) =

Electoral ward in the London borough of Lambeth

Coordinates: 51.453°N 0.126°W

- Former electoral ward for the Lambeth London Borough Council
- Brixton Hill ward boundaries
- Borough: Lambeth
- County: Greater London
- Population: 15,842 (2011)
- Electorate: 11,611 (2018)

Former electoral ward
- Created: 2002
- Abolished: 2022
- Member: 3
- Replaced by: Brixton Acre Lane; Brixton Rush Common; Clapham Park; St Martin's
- GSS code: E05000417
- ONS code: 00AYGA

Brixton Hill was an electoral ward in the London Borough of Lambeth, United Kingdom. The ward existed from 2002 to 2022. It was first used in the 2002 elections and last used for the 2018 elections. It returned three councillors to Lambeth London Borough Council.

== List of councillors ==
Term	Councillor	Party
2002–2006	Nick Cattermole	Labour
2002–2013	Steve Reed	Labour
2002–2006	Lydia Serwaa	Labour
2006–2010	Betty Evans-Jacas	Labour
2006–2018	Florence Eshalomi	Labour
2010–2014	Alexander Holland	Labour
2013–2022	Martin Tiedemann	Labour
2014–2022	Adrian Garden	Labour
2018–2022	Maria Kay	Labour

== Lambeth council elections ==
=== 2018 election ===
The election took place on 3 May 2018.

2018 Lambeth London Borough Council election: Brixton Hill
Party	Candidate	Votes	%	±%
Labour Co-op	Maria Kay	2,142		
Labour Co-op	Adrian Garden	2,015		
Labour Co-op	Martin Tiedemann	1,796		
Green	Gwen Buck	856		
Women's Equality	Janet Baker	842		
Green	Richard Bultitude	517		
Green	Will Eaves	478		
Liberal Democrats	Sarah Lewis	420		
Conservative	Tamara Bailey	389		
Conservative	Lavinia Cartwright	349		
Liberal Democrats	Peter Portelli	322		
Conservative	Savill Young	319		
Liberal Democrats	Jonathan Price	192		
Turnout				
Labour hold		Swing		
Labour hold		Swing		
Labour hold		Swing		

=== 2014 election ===
The election took place on 22 May 2014.

2014 Lambeth London Borough Council election: Brixton Hill
Party	Candidate	Votes	%	±%
Labour	Adrian Garden	1,849		
Labour	Florence Eshalomi	1,791		
Labour	Martin Tiedemann	1,560		
Green	Roger Baker	818		
Green	Andrew Child	768		
Green	Betty Mehari	719		
Conservative	James Calder	415		
Conservative	Charles Tankard	381		
Conservative	Michael Woolley	310		
UKIP	Paul Gregory	254		
Liberal Democrats	Chris Keating	244		
Liberal Democrats	Liz Maffei	231		
Liberal Democrats	Adam Pritchard	228		
TUSC	Lisa Bainbridge	132		
TUSC	Alex Richardson	83		
TUSC	Jessica Walters	74		
Total votes		9,857		
Labour hold		Swing		
Labour hold		Swing		
Labour hold		Swing		

=== 2013 by-election ===
The by-election took place on 17 January 2013, following the resignation of Steve Reed.

2013 Brixton Hill by-election
Party	Candidate	Votes	%	±%
Labour	Martin Tiedemann	1,593	62.6	+21.9
Green	Andrew Child	344	13.5	−2.6
Liberal Democrats	Liz Maffei	274	10.8	−29.7
Conservative	Timothy Briggs	165	6.4	−6.0
TUSC	Steve Nally	72	2.8	N/A
UKIP	Elizabeth Jones	63	2.5	N/A
Majority		1,249	49.1	%
Turnout		2,544	22.7	
Labour hold		Swing		

=== 2010 election ===
The election on 6 May 2010 took place on the same day as the United Kingdom general election.

2010 Lambeth London Borough Council election: Brixton Hill
Party	Candidate	Votes	%	±%
Labour	Alexander Holland	2,805		
Labour	Steve Reed	2,699		
Labour	Florence Nosegbe	2,648		
Liberal Democrats	Kate Horstead	2,100		
Liberal Democrats	Krystal Johnson	1,873		
Liberal Democrats	John Mead	1,560		
Green	Thomas Law	1,108		
Green	Elkin Atwell	1,023		
Conservative	Timothy Briggs	873		
Green	Phillipa Marlowe-Hunt	850		
Conservative	Victoria Edwards	768		
Conservative	Diana Thompson	688		
Total votes		18,995		
Labour hold		Swing		
Labour hold		Swing		
Labour hold		Swing		

=== 2006 election ===
The election took place on 4 May 2006.

2006 Lambeth London Borough Council election: Brixton Hill
Party	Candidate	Votes	%	±%
Labour	Steve Reed	1,354	45.3	
Labour	Betty Evans-Jacas	1,213		
Labour	Florence Nosegbe	1,206		
Green	Roger Baker	714	23.9	
Green	Thomas Law	596		
Green	Amrit Chanion	559		
Liberal Democrats	Elsie Binder	534	17.9	
Liberal Democrats	Duncan Brack	469		
Liberal Democrats	Alexander Davies	406		
Conservative	Penelope Sinclair	389	13.0	
Conservative	John Taylor	351		
Conservative	Barbara Windbourne	329		
Total votes		8,120		
Labour hold		Swing		
Labour hold		Swing		
Labour hold		Swing		

=== 2002 election ===
The election took place on 2 May 2002.

2002 Lambeth London Borough Council election: Brixton Hill
Party	Candidate	Votes	%	±%
Labour	Nick Cattermole	1,067	17.7	
Labour	Steve Reed	1,017	16.9	
Labour	Lydia Serwaa	1,015	16.9	
Green	Debbie Dixon	459	7.6	
Green	Wayne Greening	393	6.5	
Liberal Democrats	Elsie Binder	377	6.3	
Liberal Democrats	Alexandra Colling	312	5.2	
Liberal Democrats	Martin Morris	312	5.2	
Socialist Alliance	Julie Hall	292	4.9	
Conservative	Patrick Butler	272	4.5	
Conservative	Matthew Bartlett	251	4.2	
Conservative	Roland Gilbert	249	4.1	
Turnout		6,106	21.8	
Labour win (new seat)				
Labour win (new seat)				
Labour win (new seat)				
