= Olga FitzRoy =

British sound engineer and campaigner

- Born: February 1982 (age 44); Berlin, Germany
- Education: Madras College
- Alma mater: University of Surrey
- Occupations: Tonmeister; Audio engineer Record producer Politician
- Employer(s): Associated Independent Recording; Music Producers Guild
- Known for: Activism
- Awards: Recording Engineer of the Year (2016)
- Website: www.olgafitzroy.com

Olga Fitzroy (born February 1982) is a German-born sound engineer at Associated Independent Recording (AIR) studios and a campaigner for shared parental leave and fair pay.

== Early life ==
Fitzroy was born in Berlin, Germany. and educated at Madras College in St Andrews, Scotland. She initially wanted to be a drummer in a punk rock band, but completed a Tonmeister degree at the University of Surrey which included a placement as a runner at AIR studios.

== Professional career ==
Fitzroy works for Associated Independent Recording (AIR) studios in Hampstead, London. She has worked with George Michael, Paul McCartney on the Love album, Chris Martin from Coldplay, Dave Grohl from the Foo Fighters, Matt Bellamy from Muse, and Hans Zimmer. She has mixed music for the London 2012 Olympics. As of 2023 her recent projects include The Crown season 5, Live In Buenos Aires by Coldplay, and Doctor Who season 13. She formerly served as a member of the Music Producers Guild (MPG) board of directors

== Campaigning and politics ==
Fitzroy unsuccessfully stood as parliamentary candidate for the Labour Party in Croydon South in the 2019 General Election against the winning Conservative incumbent Chris Philp. She is the founder of Parental Pay Equality and worked closely with Tracy Brabin on the Selfieleave Bill to give shared parental leave to the self-employed in 2018.

During Covid she worked pro-bono for the charity Pregnant Then Screwed, leading their work on a judicial review against the chancellor for discrimination in the SEISS scheme.

She was elected as a councillor for St Martin's ward in Lambeth in the May 2022 local elections.

She stood to be the Labour prospective parliamentary candidate for the new constituency of Croydon East at the 2024 general election. She lost the nomination to Natasha Irons.

== Awards and honours ==
Fitzroy was named recording engineer of the year at the Music Producers Guild (MPG) awards in 2016. She was recognised by BBC Radio 4 on Woman's Hour power list in 2018 for her successful campaign for shared parental leave and maternity allowance for self-employed and freelance staff. In 2019 she was awarded the Ivors Academy Gold Badge Award and also the 2019 campaigner of the year award at Music Week's women in music awards., which was presented by Tom Watson.
