= Stockwell West and Larkhall =

Electoral ward in London, England

- Electoral ward for the Lambeth London Borough Council
- Borough: Lambeth
- County: Greater London
- Major settlements: Stockwell

Current electoral ward
- Created: 2022
- Councillors: 3
- Created from: Stockwell (ward) and Larkhall (ward)

Stockwell West and Larkhall is an electoral ward in the London Borough of Lambeth. The ward was first used in the 2022 elections. It returns three councillors to Lambeth London Borough Council.

== List of councillors ==
Term	Councillor	Party
2022–present	Joe Dharampal-Hornby	Labour Co-op
2022–present	Joanne Simpson	Labour Co-op
2022–present	David Oxley	Labour Co-op

== Lambeth council elections ==
=== 2022 election ===
The election took place on 5 May 2022.

2022 Lambeth London Borough Council election: Stockwell West and Larkhall (3)
Party	Candidate	Votes	%	±%
Labour	Joe Dharampal-Hornby	1,929	63.1	
Labour	Joanne Simpson *	1,895	62.0	
Labour	David Oxley	1,749	57.2	
Green	Kevin Brown	554	18.1	
Conservative	James Bellis	551	18.0	
Green	Becki Newell	510	16.7	
Green	Alice Playle	354	11.6	
Liberal Democrats	Gareth Davison	322	10.5	
Conservative	Joshua Forrester	321	10.5	
Liberal Democrats	Anna Grundill	321	10.5	
Conservative	James Strawson	310	10.1	
Liberal Democrats	Celia Thomas	266	8.7	
TUSC	Steve Nally	87	2.8	
Turnout		3,173	27.0	
Labour win (new boundaries)				
Labour win (new boundaries)				
Labour win (new boundaries)				

*Joanne Simpson was a sitting councillor for Prince's ward.
