= Clapham Common (ward) =

Electoral ward in the London borough of Lambeth

Coordinates: 51.457°N 0.138°W

- Former electoral ward for the Lambeth London Borough Council
- Borough: Lambeth
- County: Greater London
- Population: 12,852 (2011)

Former electoral ward
- Created: 2002
- Abolished: 2022
- Member: 3
- Replaced by: Clapham East; Clapham Common and Abbeville; Clapham Park

Clapham Common was an administrative division of the London Borough of Lambeth, United Kingdom from 2002 to 2022.

== Demography ==
The ward stretched south from Clapham Park Road to the boundary with Wandsworth at Balham Hill. It contained roads such as the A24 Clapham Common Southside and Abbeville Road, along with Lambeth College and Lambeth Academy. Approximately one quarter of the area of ward was taken up with Clapham Common. At the 2011 Census the population of the ward was 12,852.

The ward was located in the Streatham parliamentary constituency.

== Lambeth Council elections ==
=== 2018 election ===
The election took place on 3 May 2018.

2018 Lambeth London Borough Council election: Clapham Common (3)
Party	Candidate	Votes	%	±%
Labour	Joe Corry-Roake	1,455		
Labour	Joanna Reynolds	1,432		
Conservative	Timothy Briggs *	1,325		
Labour	Tim Goodwin	1,293		
Conservative	David Frost	1,189		
Conservative	Leslie Maruziva	1,164		
Green	Joanna Eaves	441		
Liberal Democrats	Charles Jenkins	439		
Liberal Democrats	Carita Ogden	320		
Liberal Democrats	Mark Newby	317		
Green	Kerstin Elaine Selander	269		
Green	Nick Humberstone	252		
Labour gain from Conservative		Swing		
Labour gain from Conservative		Swing		
Conservative hold		Swing		

=== 2014 election ===
2014 Lambeth London Borough Council election: Clapham Common (3)
Party	Candidate	Votes	%	±%
Conservative	Timothy Briggs	1,205		
Conservative	Louise Nathanson	1,154		
Conservative	Bernard Gentry	1,102		
Labour	Tim Goodwin	1,028		
Labour	Nichola Hartwell	955		
Labour	Jack Pascoe	870		
Green	Hannah Cutler	433		
Green	Peter Kelly	372		
Liberal Democrats	Matthew Bryant	328		
Green	Shash Selander	268		
Liberal Democrats	Simon Drage	247		
Liberal Democrats	Ruhi Hayat-Khan	229		
UKIP	Anne Marie Waters	219		
Total votes		9,896		
Conservative gain from Liberal Democrats		Swing		
Conservative hold		Swing		
Conservative hold		Swing		

=== 2010 election ===
The election took place on 6 May 2010.

2010 Lambeth London Borough Council election: Clapham Common (3)
Party	Candidate	Votes	%	±%
Liberal Democrats	Christine Barratt	2,176		
Conservative	Shirley Cosgrave	2,084		
Conservative	Julia Memery	2,040		
Conservative	Lloyd Milton	2,009		
Labour	Ruth Ling *	1,715		
Labour	Linda Bray	1,637		
Liberal Democrats	Simon Cordon	1,606		
Liberal Democrats	Julian Heather	1,579		
Labour	Iain Simpson	1,408		
Green	Anne Base	502		
Green	Jamie Hamilton	445		
Green	Anne Kenner	270		
Total votes		17,211		
Liberal Democrats hold		Swing		
Conservative gain from Labour		Swing		
Conservative gain from Liberal Democrats		Swing		

=== 2006 election ===
The election took place on 4 May 2006.

2006 Lambeth London Borough Council election: Clapham Common (3)
Party	Candidate	Votes	%	±%
Labour	Ruth Ling *	990		
Liberal Democrats	Darren Sanders *	964		
Liberal Democrats	Angela Meander *	914		
Liberal Democrats	Heather Sherratt	900		
Conservative	Steven Jones	886		
Conservative	Lloyd Milton	866		
Conservative	Alistair Hamilton	830		
Labour	David Walker	826		
Labour	Brian Witington	800		
Green	Timothy Beaumont	438		
Green	Zana Dean	370		
Total votes		8,740		
Labour hold		Swing		
Liberal Democrats hold		Swing		
Liberal Democrats hold		Swing		

=== 2002 election ===
The election took place on 2 May 2002.

2002 Lambeth London Borough Council election: Clapham Common (3)
Party	Candidate	Votes	%	±%
Labour	Ruth Ling	972		
Liberal Democrats	Angela Meander	964		
Liberal Democrats	Darren Sanders	917		
Labour	Andy Harrop	863		
Labour	Roland Doven	856		
Liberal Democrats	Matthew Bryant	839		
Conservative	Joanna Barker	748		
Conservative	Anthony Bays	744		
Conservative	Gareth Williams	739		
Green	Timothy Beaumont	274		
Turnout		7,916	30.1	
Labour win (new seat)				
Liberal Democrats win (new seat)				
Liberal Democrats win (new seat)				
