= Myatt's Fields (ward) =

Electoral ward in London, England

- Electoral ward for the Lambeth London Borough Council
- Myatt's Fields ward boundaries since 2022
- Borough: Lambeth
- County: Greater London
- Population: 10,932 (2021) (Note: 2021 Census data reported for 2022 ward boundaries)
- Major settlements: Myatt's Fields South Estate and Myatt's Fields Park
- Area: 0.8034 square kilometres (0.3102 sq mi)

Current electoral ward
- Created: 2022
- Number of members: 2
- Councillors: Patience Clague; Molly Hartill
- Created from: Vassall
- GSS code: E05014107

Myatt's Fields is an electoral ward in the London Borough of Lambeth. The ward was first used in the 2022 elections. It returns two councillors to Lambeth London Borough Council.

== List of councillors ==
| Term | Councillor | Party |
|---|---|---|
| 2022–2026 | Paul Gadsby | Labour Co-op |
| 2022–2026 | Annie Gallop | Labour Co-op |
| 2026–present | Patience Clague | Green |
| 2026–present | Molly Hartill | Labour Co-op |

== Lambeth council elections ==
=== 2026 by-election ===
The by-election took place on 8 October 2026, following the death of Annie Gallop.

2026 Myatt's Fields by-election
| Party | Candidate | Votes | % | ±% |
|---|---|---|---|---|
| Labour | Molly Hartill | 1,026 | 47 | +10.3 |
| Green | Sonia Winifred | 815 | 37 | −2 |
| Liberal Democrats | Christopher French | 189 | 9 | +1.5 |
| Conservative | John Hindson | 74 | 3 | −1.8 |
| Reform | Mark Mckee | 58 | 3 | −2.7 |
| CPA | Yemi Awolola | 26 | 1 | N/A |
| Socialist (GB) | Anya Krycek | 9 | 0 | N/A |
| Turnout | | 2,197 | | |
| Labour Co-op hold | | Swing | | |

=== 2026 election ===
The election took place on 7 May 2026.

2026 Lambeth London Borough Council election: Myatt's Fields
| Party | Candidate | Votes | % | ±% |
|---|---|---|---|---|
| Green | Patience Clague | 1,267 | 41.4 | +19.8 |
| Labour Co-op | Annie Gallop | 1,179 | 38.5 | −24.7 |
| Green | John Lubbock | 1,162 | 37.9 | +20.1 |
| Labour Co-op | Molly Hartill | 1,108 | 36.2 | −26.0 |
| Liberal Democrats | Chris Lomax | 230 | 7.5 | −2.8 |
| Liberal Democrats | Annette Minott | 220 | 7.2 | −0.8 |
| Independent | Tara Amfo | 198 | 6.5 | N/A |
| Reform | Tom Beardsworth | 173 | 5.6 | N/A |
| Conservative | Charles Pender | 169 | 5.5 | −3.4 |
| Conservative | Tesfah Guwazah | 132 | 4.3 | −3.8 |
| TUSC | Marco Tesei | 27 | 0.9 | N/A |
| Turnout | | 3,062 | 37.1 | +8.4 |
| Registered electors | | 8,255 | | |
| Green gain from Labour Co-op | | Swing | | |
| Labour Co-op hold | | Swing | | |

=== 2022 election ===
The election took place on 5 May 2022.

2022 Lambeth London Borough Council election: Myatt's Fields
| Party | Candidate | Votes | % | ±% |
|---|---|---|---|---|
| Labour Co-op | Annie Gallop | 1,421 | 63.2 | |
| Labour Co-op | Paul Gadsby | 1,399 | 62.2 | |
| Green | Dzaier Neil | 486 | 21.6 | |
| Green | Sean Walsh | 400 | 17.8 | |
| Liberal Democrats | Kate Noble | 232 | 10.3 | |
| Conservative | Harvey Chandler | 200 | 8.9 | |
| Conservative | James Hallett | 182 | 8.1 | |
| Liberal Democrats | Nicolas Gibbon | 180 | 8.0 | |
| Turnout | | 2,342 | 28.7 | |
| Labour Co-op win (new seat) | | | | |
| Labour Co-op win (new seat) | | | | |
