= Brixton North =

- Electoral ward for the Lambeth London Borough Council
- Brixton North ward boundaries since 2022
- Borough: Lambeth
- County: Greater London
- Population: 16,324 (2021) (Note: 2021 Census data reported for 2022 ward boundaries)
- Electorate: 11,113 (2022)
- Major settlements: Brixton
- Area: 0.9090 square kilometres (0.3510 sq mi)

Current electoral ward
- Created: 2022
- Number of members: 3
- Councillors: Nanda Manley-Browne; Samantha Dorney-Smith; John-Paul Ennis
- GSS code: E05014096

Brixton North is an electoral ward in the London Borough of Lambeth. The ward was first used in the 2022 elections. It returns three councillors to Lambeth London Borough Council.

== List of councillors ==
Term	Councillor	Party
2022–present	Nanda Manley-Browne	Labour Co-op
2022–2026	James Bryan	Labour Co-op
2022–present	John-Paul Ennis	Labour Co-op
2026–present	Samantha Dorney-Smith	Green

== Lambeth council elections ==
=== 2026 election ===
Brixton North (3 seats)
Party	Candidate	Votes	%	±%
Labour Co-op	Nanda Manley-Browne*	1,415		
Green	Samantha Dorney-Smith	1,388		
Labour Co-op	John-Paul Ennis*	1,365		
Green	Rolf Britten	1,304		
Labour Co-op	James Seabridge	1,189		
Green	Tim Gingell	1,169		
Independent	Eduardo Salgado	372		
Conservative	Claire Collins	261		
Conservative	Marcia Da Costa	252		
Liberal Democrats	Monica Whyte	215		
Liberal Democrats	John Siraut	200		
Reform	Adam De Bell	189		
Liberal Democrats	Ian Tedder	186		
Conservative	Kathryn Uhde	167		
Socialist (GB)	Anya Krycek	77		
TUSC	Theo Sharieff	53		
Turnout		3,456	31.3	+5.5
Registered electors		11,046		
Labour Co-op hold				
Green gain from Labour Co-op				
Labour Co-op hold				

=== 2022 election ===
The election took place on 5 May 2022.

2022 Lambeth London Borough Council election: Brixton North (3)
Party	Candidate	Votes	%	±%
Labour Co-op	Nanda Manley-Browne	1,855		
Labour Co-op	James Bryan	1,813		
Labour Co-op	John-Paul Ennis	1,709		
Green	Nadine Brown	695		
Green	Charlie Button	531		
Green	Neil Sheppeck	469		
Conservative	Frederick Ellery	220		
Liberal Democrats	Poppy Hasted	213		
Conservative	Katherine Sloggett	212		
Conservative	Lewis Leach	203		
Liberal Democrats	Jing Tang	196		
Liberal Democrats	Ian Tedder	136		
Turnout		2,869		
Labour Co-op win (new seat)				
Labour Co-op win (new seat)				
Labour Co-op win (new seat)				
