= Streatham Hill West and Thornton =

Electoral ward in London, England

- Electoral ward for the Lambeth London Borough Council
- Borough: Lambeth
- County: Greater London
- Major settlements: Streatham

Current electoral ward
- Created: 2022
- Councillors: 2
- Created from: Streatham Hill (ward)

Streatham Hill West and Thornton is an electoral ward in the London Borough of Lambeth. The ward was first used in the 2022 elections. It returns two councillors to Lambeth London Borough Council.

== List of councillors ==
Term	Councillor	Party
2022–present	Matthew Bryant	Liberal Democrats
2022–present	Donna Harris	Liberal Democrats

== Lambeth council elections ==
=== 2022 election ===
The election took place on 5 May 2022.

2022 Lambeth London Borough Council election: Streatham Hill West and Thornton (2)
Party	Candidate	Votes	%	±%
Liberal Democrats	Matthew Bryant	1,416	43.6	
Liberal Democrats	Donna Harris	1,370	42.2	
Labour	Ed Davie *	1,349	41.6	
Labour	Beverley Randall	1,275	39.3	
Green	Adrian Audsley	409	12.6	
Green	Peter Johnson	250	7.7	
Conservative	Russell Henman	231	7.1	
Conservative	Kushal Patel	190	5.9	
Turnout		3,323	41.6	
Liberal Democrats win (new boundaries)				
Liberal Democrats win (new boundaries)				

*Ed Davie was a sitting councillor for Thornton ward.
