= Brixton Rush Common =

- Electoral ward for the Lambeth London Borough Council
- Brixton Rush Common ward boundaries since 2022
- Borough: Lambeth
- County: Greater London
- Population: 14,930 (2021) (Note: 2021 Census data reported for 2022 ward boundaries)
- Electorate: 10,645 (2026)
- Major settlements: Brixton
- Area: 1.003 square kilometres (0.387 sq mi)

Current electoral ward
- Created: 2022
- Number of members: 3
- Councillors: Zvikomborero Chihoro; Sacha Takyi-Berko; Viktor Westerdahl
- Created from: Brixton Hill, Coldharbour, Tulse Hill
- GSS code: E05014097

Brixton Rush Common is an electoral ward in the London Borough of Lambeth. The ward was first used in the 2022 elections. It returns three councillors to Lambeth London Borough Council.

== List of councillors ==
Term	Councillor	Party
2022–2026	Marcia Cameron	Labour
2022–2026	Ben Kind	Labour
2022–2026	Adrian Garden	Labour
2026–present	Zvikomborero Chihoro	Green
2026–present	Sacha Takyi-Berko	Green
2026–present	Viktor Westerdahl	Green

== Lambeth council elections ==
=== 2026 election ===
The election took place on 7 May 2026.

2026 Lambeth London Borough Council election: Brixton Rush Common
Party	Candidate	Votes	%	±%
Green	Zvikomborero Chihoro	2,132	16	
Green	Sacha Takyi-Berko	2,106	16	
Green	Viktor Westerdahl	1,982	15	
Labour	Marcia Cameron	1,810	14	
Labour	Ben Kind	1,676	13	
Labour	Adrian Garden	1,572	12	
Liberal Democrats	Ben Austin	359	3	
Liberal Democrats	Abbi Alsalmi	317	2	
Liberal Democrats	Paul Medlicott	239	2	
Conservative	Elaine Tamara Bailey	216	2	
Conservative	Ella Ruth Mulford	207	2	
Reform	David Palmer	207	2	
Conservative	Lavinia Arden Cartwright	197	2	
CPA	Yemi Awolola	100	1	
Turnout				
Registered electors		10,645		
Green gain from Labour		Swing		
Green gain from Labour		Swing		
Green gain from Labour		Swing		

=== 2022 election ===
The election took place on 5 May 2022.

2022 Lambeth London Borough Council election: Brixton Rush Common
Party	Candidate	Votes	%	±%
Labour	Marcia Cameron	2,070	65.4	
Labour	Ben Kind	1,902	60.1	
Labour	Adrian Garden	1,779	56.2	
Green	Zana Dean	928	29.3	
Green	Laura Vroomen	769	24.3	
Green	Janell English	654	20.7	
Liberal Democrats	Abbi Alsalmi	285	9.0	
Liberal Democrats	Ben Austin	278	8.8	
Liberal Democrats	Paul Medlicott	215	6.8	
Conservative	Lisabeth Liell	212	6.7	
Conservative	Valerio Ficcadenti	210	6.6	
Conservative	Colin Watkins	198	6.3	
Turnout		3,306	30.9	
Labour win (new seat)				
Labour win (new seat)				
Labour win (new seat)				
