= West Dulwich (ward) =

Electoral ward in England

- Electoral ward for the Lambeth London Borough Council
- West Dulwich ward boundaries since 2022
- Borough: Lambeth
- County: Greater London
- Major settlements: West Dulwich

Current electoral ward
- Created: 2022
- Councillors: 2

West Dulwich is an electoral ward in the London Borough of Lambeth. The ward was first used in the 2022 elections. It returns two councillors to Lambeth London Borough Council.

== List of councillors ==
Term	Councillor	Party
2022–present	Judith Cavanagh	Labour Co-op
2022–present	Fred Cowell	Labour Co-op

== Lambeth council elections ==
=== 2022 election ===
The election took place on 5 May 2022.

2022 Lambeth London Borough Council election: West Dulwich (2)
Party	Candidate	Votes	%	±%
Labour Co-op	Judith Cavanagh	1,729	52.5	
Labour Co-op	Fred Cowell *	1,639	49.8	
Conservative	Irene Kimm	689	20.9	
Green	Kim Thornton	686	20.8	
Conservative	Sharon Turner	616	18.7	
Green	Su Opie	565	17.2	
Liberal Democrats	Jeremy Baker	332	10.1	
Liberal Democrats	Christine Hinton	326	9.9	
Turnout		3,378	40.3	
Labour Co-op win (new seat)				
Labour Co-op win (new seat)				

Fred Cowell was a sitting councillor for Thurlow Park ward.
