= Clapham East =

Electoral ward in London, England

- Electoral ward for the Lambeth London Borough Council
- Clapham East ward boundaries since 2022
- Borough: Lambeth
- County: Greater London
- Population: 9,845 (2021) (Note: 2021 Census data reported for 2022 ward boundaries)
- Electorate: 7,477 (2022)
- Major settlements: Clapham
- Area: 0.6308 square kilometres (0.2436 sq mi)

Current electoral ward
- Created: 2022
- Number of members: 2
- Councillors: Jess Leigh; Andrew Collins
- Created from: Clapham Common; Clapham Town; Ferndale; Larkhall
- GSS code: E05014100

Clapham East is an electoral ward in the London Borough of Lambeth. The ward was first used in the 2022 elections. It returns two councillors to Lambeth London Borough Council.

== List of councillors ==
Term	Councillor	Party
2022–present	Jess Leigh	Labour Co-op
2022–present	Andrew Collins	Labour Co-op

== Lambeth council elections ==
=== 2022 election ===
The election took place on 5 May 2022.

2022 Lambeth London Borough Council election: Clapham East (2)
Party	Candidate	Votes	%	±%
Labour Co-op	Jess Leigh	1,127	68.1	
Labour Co-op	Andrew Collins	1,073	64.8	
Green	Nick Hattersley	411	24.8	
Liberal Democrats	Iestyn Williams	224	13.5	
Conservative	Jake Freeman	215	13.0	
Conservative	John Hindson	193	11.7	
TUSC	Bobbie Cranney	38	2.3	
Socialist (GB)	Daniel Lambert	31	1.9	
Turnout		1,744	23.2	
Labour Co-op win (new seat)				
Labour Co-op win (new seat)				

Jess Leigh was elected to the predecessor Ferndale ward in 2018.
