= Clapham Common and Abbeville =

Electoral ward in South London, England

- Electoral ward for the Lambeth London Borough Council
- Clapham Common and Abbeville ward boundaries since 2022
- Borough: Lambeth
- County: Greater London
- Population: 10,015 (2021) (Note: 2021 Census data reported for 2022 ward boundaries)
- Electorate: 7,405 (2022)
- Major settlements: Clapham Park
- Area: 1.078 square kilometres (0.416 sq mi)

Current electoral ward
- Created: 2022
- Number of members: 2
- Councillors: Ben Curtis; Alison Inglis-Jones
- GSS code: E05014099

Clapham Common and Abbeville is an electoral ward in the London Borough of Lambeth. The ward was first used in the 2022 elections, and it returns two councillors to Lambeth London Borough Council.

== List of councillors ==
| Term | Councillor | Party |
|---|---|---|
| 2022–present | Ben Curtis | Liberal Democrats |
| 2022–present | Alison Inglis-Jones | Labour |

== Lambeth council elections ==
=== 2022 election ===
The election took place on 5 May 2022.

2022 Lambeth London Borough Council election: Clapham Common and Abbeville (2)
| Party | Candidate | Votes | % | ±% |
|---|---|---|---|---|
| Liberal Democrats | Ben Curtis | 1,006 | 35.3 | |
| Labour | Alison Inglis-Jones | 926 | 32.5 | |
| Labour | Joanna Reynolds | 916 | 32.1 | |
| Liberal Democrats | Fareed Alderechi | 885 | 31.0 | |
| Conservative | Tim Briggs | 782 | 27.4 | |
| Conservative | David Frost | 686 | 24.1 | |
| Green | Fran Cavanagh | 256 | 9.0 | |
| Green | Karen Hautz | 221 | 7.8 | |
| Reform | Edward Cole | 23 | 0.8 | |
| Turnout | | 2,908 | 39.2 | |
| Liberal Democrats win (new seat) | | | | |
| Labour win (new seat) | | | | |
