= Stockwell East =

Electoral ward in London, England

- Electoral ward for the Lambeth London Borough Council
- Borough: Lambeth
- County: Greater London
- Major settlements: Stockwell

Current electoral ward
- Created: 2022
- Councillors: 2
- Replaced by: Stockwell (ward)

Stockwell East is an electoral ward in the London Borough of Lambeth. The ward was first used in the 2022 elections. It returns two councillors to Lambeth London Borough Council.

== List of councillors ==
Term	Councillor	Party
2026–present	Tam Langley	Liberal Democrat
2026–present	Kevin Brown	Green Party
2022–2026	Tina Valcarcel	Liberal Democrat
2022–2026	Mahamed Hashi	Labour Co-op

== Lambeth council elections ==
=== 2026 election ===
Stockwell East (2)
Party	Candidate	Votes	%	±%
Green	Kevin Brown	875	33.4	+9.6
Liberal Democrats	Tam Langley	850	32.5	+17.6
Labour	Mohammed Hashi *	832	31.82	−20.38
Liberal Democrats	David Whitaker	779	29.79	+16.99
Green	Qaisar Rana	724	27.72	+9.52
Labour	Rebecca Spencer *	712	27.15	−26.35
Reform	Nicholas Maund	156	5.89	+5.89
Conservative	Alicia Hollings	144	5.54	−6.66
Conservative	Henrietta Royle	140	5.39	−6.91
TUSC	Berkay Kartav	19	0.73	+0.73
Turnout		5,231	36.8%	
Registered electors		7,101		
Green gain from Labour		Swing	15%	
Liberal Democrats gain from Labour		Swing	22%	

- Rebecca Spencer was a councillor for Gipsy Hill ward, elected in 2022

=== 2022 election ===
The election took place on 5 May 2022. Cllr Valcarcel defected to the Liberal Democrats on 9 November 2025, she had been a Labour councillor since 2006.

2022 Lambeth London Borough Council election: Stockwell East (2)
Party	Candidate	Votes	%	±%
Labour	Tina Valcarcel *	1,114	53.5	
Labour	Mahamed Hashi *	1,087	52.2	
Green	Abhishek Agarwal	495	23.8	
Green	Vincent Manning	379	18.2	
Liberal Democrats	Rachel Lester	311	14.9	
Liberal Democrats	Sally Mitton	266	12.8	
Conservative	Henrietta Royle	257	12.3	
Conservative	Stuart Barr	253	12.2	
Turnout		2,162	29.8	
Labour win (new boundaries)				
Labour win (new boundaries)				

- Mahamed Hashi was a sitting councillor for Stockwell ward.
- Tina Valcarcel was a sitting councillor for Larkhall ward.
