= Prince's (ward) =

Coordinates: 51.492°N 0.115°W

- Former electoral ward for the Lambeth London Borough Council
- Prince's ward boundaries from 2002 to 2022
- Borough: Lambeth
- County: Greater London

Former electoral ward
- Created: 1965
- Abolished: 2022
- Member: 3

Prince's ward was an administrative division of the London Borough of Lambeth, England from 1965 to 2022. It was located in the north of the borough, bounded by the River Thames on the west and Kennington Park Road on the east. It was made up of much of Kennington and Vauxhall.

Prince's ward was located in the Vauxhall parliamentary constituency and was one of four wards in the borough's north Lambeth division.

Prince's contained two schools: Archbishop Sumner Primary School, and Vauxhall Primary School. Prince's along with its neighbouring Oval ward, is home to the buzzing night-time economy of Vauxhall, including the renowned Grade II listed, LGBT venue Royal Vauxhall Tavern.

Prince's was also the home of Vauxhall Gardens Estate Residents and Tenants Association (VGERTA) that represents 2,500 residents in Vauxhall Gardens Estate which is the biggest Residents and Tenants Association in Lambeth.

== Local landmarks ==
- Vauxhall City Farm, located in the Vauxhall Pleasure Gardens.
- British Secret Intelligence Service, MI6 Headquarters, on Albert Embankment
- Newport Street Gallery, home to Damien Hirst's art collection
- The City and Guilds of London Art School, one of the longest-established art colleges in the country, has been at Kennington Park Road since 1879
- The Cinema Museum on Dugard Way.

== 2002–2022 Lambeth council elections ==
=== 2018 election ===
2018 Lambeth London Borough Council election: Prince's (3)
Party	Candidate	Votes	%	±%
Labour	David Amos*	2,395	57.8	
Labour	Jon Davies	2,325		
Labour	Jo Simpson*	2,256		
Liberal Democrats	Richard Hardman	644	13.6	
Green	Helen Gardiner	591	11.0	
Conservative	Claire Barker	590	12.6	
Liberal Democrats	Colette Thomas	542		
Conservative	Michael Jefferson	482		
Conservative	Jon Harrison	481		
Liberal Democrats	Christopher Keating	461		
Green	Fern Lindsay	422		
Women's Equality	Eleanor Hemmens	326	2.7	
Green	Nick Hemus	318		
UKIP	Alan Bowles	101	2.1	
UKIP	Robert Stephenson	75		
UKIP	Mattias Tornstrand	67		
Federalist Party	Stuart Clark	26	0.2	
Labour hold		Swing		
Labour hold		Swing		
Labour hold		Swing		

=== 2015 by-election ===
Prince's by-election, 7 May 2015
Party	Candidate	Votes	%	±%
Labour	Valia McClure	3,452		
Liberal Democrats	Adrian Hyyrylainen-Trett	1,748		
Conservative	Gareth Wallace	1,618		
Green	Marie James	901		
TUSC	Kingsley Abrahams	99		
Socialist (GB)	Danny Lambert	42		
Majority		1,704		
Turnout		7,760		
Labour hold		Swing		

=== 2014 election ===
2014 Lambeth London Borough Council election: Prince's (3)
Party	Candidate	Votes	%	±%
Labour	David Amos*	2,342	49.9	
Labour	Chris Marsh	2,160		
Labour	Joanne Simpson	2,058		
Conservative	Claire Barker	761	16.2	
Conservative	James Bellis	705		
Conservative	Michael Poole-Wilson	606		
Green	Eleanor Halsall	548	11.7	
Green	Joe Taylor	479		
Liberal Democrats	Vivienne Baines	441	9.4	
Green	Fern Lindsay	428		
Liberal Democrats	Malcolm Baines	401		
Liberal Democrats	Daisy Christodoulou	360		
UKIP	John Dodds	334	7.1	
Independent	John Howard	170	3.6	
TUSC	Laurence Hutchinson	95	2.0	
Total votes		11,888		
Labour hold		Swing		
Labour hold		Swing		
Labour hold		Swing		

=== 2010 election ===
2010 Lambeth London Borough Council election: Prince's (3)
Party	Candidate	Votes	%	±%
Labour	Mark Harrison	2,847		
Labour	Lorna Campbell *	2,804		
Labour	Stephen Morgan *	2,653		
Liberal Democrats	Gloria Gomez Canal	1,371		
Liberal Democrats	Sandra Lawman	1,343		
Liberal Democrats	John Munro	1,246		
Conservative	James Bellis	1,161		
Conservative	Michael Poole-Wilson	1,083		
Conservative	Richard Rajgopaul-Hicklin	1,051		
Green	Emily Butterworth	644		
Green	Joseph Healy	381		
Green	Marcus Letts	337		
English Democrat	John Dodds	135		
English Democrat	Alfredo Cordal	106		
Total votes		17,162		
Labour hold		Swing		
Labour hold		Swing		
Labour hold		Swing		

=== 2006 election ===
2006 Lambeth London Borough Council election: Prince's (3)
Party	Candidate	Votes	%	±%
Labour	Lorna Campbell	1,486		
Labour	Samuel Townend	1,075		
Labour	James Morgan	1,046		
Liberal Democrats	Rita Fitzgerald	991		
Liberal Democrats	Keite Fitchett *	867		
Liberal Democrats	Charles Anglin *	876		
Conservative	Liam Campbell	856		
Conservative	Richard Hyslop	505		
Green	Paul Steedman	495		
Conservative	Nicholas Gibbon	476		
LEABP	Eugenia Rattigan	153		
LEABP	Andrew Amos	137		
Total votes		9,433		
Labour gain from Liberal Democrats		Swing		
Labour gain from Liberal Democrats		Swing		
Labour gain from Liberal Democrats		Swing		

=== 2002 election ===
2002 Lambeth London Borough Council election: Prince's (3)
Party	Candidate	Votes	%	±%
Liberal Democrats	Keith Fitchett*	1,444		
Liberal Democrats	Charles Anglin*	1,404		
Liberal Democrats	Dinti Wakefield	1,402		
Labour	Stephen Morgan	1,236		
Labour	Peter Bowyer	1,185		
Labour	Samuel Townend	1,183		
Conservative	Andrew Hayes	464		
Green	James Wallace	260		
Conservative	Simon Allison	250		
Conservative	Kiloran Heckels	242		
Turnout		8,870	34.0	
Liberal Democrats gain from Labour		Swing		

== 1964–1978 Lambeth council elections ==
External image
- Prince's ward boundaries from 1965 to 1978
