= St Martin's (Lambeth ward) =

Electoral ward in London, England

- Electoral ward for the Lambeth London Borough Council
- St Martin's ward boundaries since 2022
- Borough: Lambeth
- County: Greater London
- Population: 10,844 (2021) (Note: 2021 Census data reported for 2022 ward boundaries)
- Electorate: 7,234 (2022))
- Area: 0.9073 square kilometres (0.3503 sq mi)

Current electoral ward
- Created: 1978–2002 (first creation); 2022 (second creation)
- Councillors: 1978–2002: 3; 2022–present: 2
- Created from: Brixton Hill, Streatham Hill, Thurlow Park and Tulse Hill in 2022
- GSS code: E05014109 (2022–present)

St Martin's is an electoral ward in the London Borough of Lambeth. The ward was originally created in 1978 and abolished in 2002. It was created again for the 2022 elections. It returned three councillors to Lambeth London Borough Council from 1978 to 2002 and two councillors since 2022.

== List of councillors ==
Term	Councillor	Party
2022–present	Olga FitzRoy	Labour Co-op
2022–present	Saleha Jaffer	Labour Co-op

== Lambeth council elections since 2022 ==
=== 2022 election ===
The election took place on 5 May 2022.

2022 Lambeth London Borough Council election: St Martin's (2)
Party	Candidate	Votes	%	±%
Labour Co-op	Olga FitzRoy	1,261	59.9	
Labour Co-op	Saleha Jaffer	1,217	57.9	
Green	Cato Sandford	462	22.0	
Green	Shâo-Lan Yuen	405	19.3	
Conservative	Lee Rotherham	230	10.9	
Conservative	Arthur Virgo	226	10.7	
Liberal Democrats	Terry Curtis	221	10.5	
Liberal Democrats	Jackie Harper-Wray	185	8.8	
Turnout		2,161	29.9	
Labour Co-op win (new boundaries)				
Labour Co-op win (new boundaries)				

*Saleha Jaffer was previously a councillor for St Leonards ward between 2014 and 2018.

== 1978–2002 Lambeth council elections ==
=== 1998 election ===
The election took place on 7 May 1998.

=== 1994 election ===
The election took place on 5 May 1994.

=== 1990 election ===
The election took place on 3 May 1990.

=== 1986 election ===
The election took place on 8 May 1986.

=== 1982 election ===
The election took place on 6 May 1982.

=== 1978 election ===
The election took place on 4 May 1978.
