= Oval (ward) =

Electoral ward in London, England

- Electoral ward for the Lambeth London Borough Council
- Oval ward boundaries since 2022
- Borough: Lambeth
- County: Greater London
- Population: 12,563 (2021) (Note: 2021 Census data reported for 2022 ward boundaries)
- Electorate: 9,086 (2022)
- Major settlements: Kennington, Oval, Vauxhall, Stockwell
- Area: 0.8403 square kilometres (0.3244 sq mi)

Current electoral ward
- Created: 1965
- Number of members: 3
- Councillors: Diogo Costa; Claire Holland; Bryn Scott
- Local council: Lambeth
- GSS code: E05014108 (2022–present)

Oval is an electoral ward in the London Borough of Lambeth, United Kingdom. The ward has existed since the creation of the borough on 1 April 1965 and was first used in the 1964 elections. It returns three councillors to Lambeth London Borough Council.

== List of councillors ==
Term	Councillor	Party
1964–1968	W. Brownett	Labour
1964–1968	G. Brownless	Labour
1964–1968	W. Burrett	Labour
1968–1971	M. Becker	Conservative
1968–1971	L. Burton	Conservative
1968–1971	J. Smith	Conservative
1971–1978	E. Carr	Labour
1971–1978	W. Juniper	Labour
1971–1978	T. Sparrow	Labour
1978–1982	David Stimpson	Labour
1978–1986	Elsie Horstead	Labour
1978–1986	John Quinn	Labour
1982–1986	Janet Boateng	Labour
1986–1990	Robert Colenutt	Labour
1986–1990	Marilyn Evers	Labour
1986–1994	Janet Crook	Labour
1990–1993	Joseph Singh	Labour
1990–1994	Alison Higgs	Labour
1993–2006	Marietta Crichton-Stuart	Liberal Democrats
1994–1998	Adrian Mayer	Liberal Democrats
1994–2010	Andrew Sawdon	Liberal Democrats
2006–2010	Robert Banks	Liberal Democrats
2006–2010	Faye Gray	Liberal Democrats
2010–2014	Ishbel Brown	Liberal Democrats
2010–2018	Angela Edbrooke	Labour
2010–2022	Jack Hopkins	Labour
2014–present	Claire Holland	Labour Co-op
2018–2022	Phillip Normal	Labour
2022–present	Diogo Costa	Labour Co-op
2022–2026	Issa Issa	Labour
2026–present	Bryn Scott	Labour Co-op

== Summary ==
Councillors elected by party at each general borough election.

- Labour / Labour Co-op
- Conservative
- Liberal Democrats

== Lambeth council elections since 2022 ==
Oval ward boundaries since 2022

There was a revision of ward boundaries in Lambeth in 2022.

=== 2026 election ===
The election took place on 7 May 2026.

2026 Lambeth London Borough Council election: Oval
Party	Candidate	Votes	%	±%
Labour Co-op	Claire Holland	1,424	13	
Labour Co-op	Diogo Costa	1,413	13	
Labour Co-op	Bryn Scott	1,220	12	
Green	Ola Aralepo	1,120	11	
Green	Callum Bennett	1,083	10	
Green	Dez Germon	1,002	9	
Liberal Democrats	Chris French	709	7	
Liberal Democrats	Blaise Baquiche	656	6	
Liberal Democrats	Pedro Xavier	648	6	
Conservative	Keith Best	290	3	
Conservative	Elizabeth Gibson	272	3	
Conservative	Lottie Moore	248	2	
Reform	Matthew Mclean	232	2	
Reform	Darren Higgins	229	2	
TUSC	Steven Nally	32	0	
Turnout				
Registered electors		9,151		
Labour Co-op hold		Swing		
Labour Co-op hold		Swing		
Labour Co-op hold		Swing		

=== 2022 election ===
The election took place on 5 May 2022.

2022 Lambeth London Borough Council election: Oval
Party	Candidate	Votes	%	±%
Labour	Claire Holland	1,601	59.8	
Labour	Diogo Costa	1,545	57.7	
Labour	Issa Issa	1,447	54.0	
Green	Pauline McAlpine	576	21.5	
Green	Denzil Everett	444	16.6	
Green	Linda Mills	411	15.3	
Liberal Democrats	Marietta Crichton-Stuart	397	14.8	
Liberal Democrats	Sarah Lewis	380	14.2	
Conservative	Keith Best	334	12.5	
Conservative	Elizabeth Gibson	323	12.1	
Conservative	Paul Mawdsley	291	10.9	
Liberal Democrats	John Siraut	286	10.7	
Turnout		2,783	30.6	
Labour win (new boundaries)				
Labour win (new boundaries)				
Labour win (new boundaries)				

== 2002–2022 Lambeth council elections ==
Oval ward boundaries from 2002 to 2022

There was a revision of ward boundaries in Lambeth in 2002.

=== 2018 election ===
The election took place on 3 May 2018.

2018 Lambeth London Borough Council election: Oval
Party	Candidate	Votes	%	±%
Labour	Claire Holland	1,983	47.1	▼4.9
Labour	Jack Hopkins	1,836		
Labour	Phillip Normal	1,719		
Liberal Democrats	Kathryn Grant	1,236	30.0	▲10.0
Liberal Democrats	Stéphane Croce	1,210		
Liberal Democrats	Mike Hillier	1,076		
Green	Michael Keane	596	11.6	▲1.0
Conservative	Joshua Gething	461	11.3	▼2.6
Green	Cath Potter	458		
Conservative	Peter Goves	455		
Conservative	James Hallett	408		
Green	Pat Price-Tomes	311		
Turnout				
Labour hold		Swing		
Labour hold		Swing		
Labour hold		Swing		

=== 2014 election ===
The election took place on 22 May 2014.

2014 Lambeth London Borough Council election: Oval
Party	Candidate	Votes	%	±%
Labour	Claire Holland	2,105	46.4	
Labour	Jack Hopkins	2,081		
Labour	Angela Edbrooke	2,013		
Liberal Democrats	Ishbel Brown	903	20.0	
Liberal Democrats	Helen Monger	769		
Liberal Democrats	George Turner	579		
Green	Anna Geffert	570	12.6	
Conservative	Stephen Humphreys	538	11.9	
Conservative	Glencora Senior	512		
Green	Sandra Young	478		
Conservative	Pawan Sharma	444		
Green	Bernard O'Sullivan	432		
UKIP	Lucia Otoyo	322	7.1	
TUSC	Steve Nally	102	2.2	
Total votes				
Labour hold		Swing		
Labour hold		Swing		
Labour gain from Liberal Democrats		Swing		

=== 2010 election ===
The election on 6 May 2010 took place on the same day as the United Kingdom general election.

2010 Lambeth London Borough Council election: Oval
Party	Candidate	Votes	%	±%
Labour	Angela Edbrooke	2,274		
Labour	Jack Hopkins	2,246		
Liberal Democrats	Ishbel Brown	2,175		
Liberal Democrats	Claudette Hewitt	2,068		
Liberal Democrats	Andrew Sawdon	2,020		
Labour	Karim Palant	1,987		
Conservative	Oliver Campbell	1,080		
Conservative	Nick Timothy	951		
Conservative	Michele Imperi	857		
Green	Charles Boxer	668		
Green	Samuel Low	422		
Green	James Staunton	332		
English Democrat	Michael Perry	77		
English Democrat	Jose Navarro	64		
English Democrat	Issam Ebarek-Rmiki	56		
Turnout				
Labour gain from Liberal Democrats		Swing		
Labour gain from Liberal Democrats		Swing		
Liberal Democrats hold		Swing		

=== 2006 election ===
The election took place on 4 May 2006.

2006 Lambeth London Borough Council election: Oval
Party	Candidate	Votes	%	±%
Liberal Democrats	Robert Banks	1,193	37.1	
Liberal Democrats	Faye Gray	1,044		
Liberal Democrats	Andrew Sawdon	1,027		
Labour	Andy Harrop	841	26.1	
Labour	Luke Herbert	792		
Labour	David Pritchard-Jones	697		
Green	Carlos Coke	471	14.6	
Conservative	Magnus Goodland	423	13.1	
Conservative	David Haigh	364		
Conservative	Sunil Tailor	340		
Green	Peter Krakowiak	323		
Local Education Action by Parents	Ruby Millington	183	5.7	
English Democrat	Janus Polenceus	108	3.4	
Turnout				
Liberal Democrats hold		Swing		
Liberal Democrats hold		Swing		
Liberal Democrats hold		Swing		

=== 2002 election ===
The election took place on 2 May 2002.

2002 Lambeth London Borough Council election: Oval
Party	Candidate	Votes	%	±%
Liberal Democrats	Marietta Crichton-Stuart	1,297	20.3	
Liberal Democrats	Geoffrey Bowring	1,178	18.4	
Liberal Democrats	Andrew Sawdon	1,151	18.0	
Labour	Giacomo Benedetto	645	10.1	
Labour	Patrick Diamond	590	9.2	
Labour	Neil Goulbourne	576	9.0	
Green	Brian Heatley	255	4.0	
Conservative	Christopher Sinclair	201	3.1	
Conservative	Arthur Hardman	197	3.1	
Conservative	Penelope Sinclair	184	2.9	
Socialist Alliance	Andrew Jackson	116	1.8	
Turnout		6,390	24.2	
Liberal Democrats win (new boundaries)				
Liberal Democrats win (new boundaries)				
Liberal Democrats win (new boundaries)				

== 1978–2002 Lambeth council elections ==
Oval ward boundaries from 1978 to 2002

There was a revision of ward boundaries in Lambeth in 1978.

=== 1998 election ===
The election on 7 May 1998 took place on the same day as the 1998 Greater London Authority referendum.

1998 Lambeth London Borough Council election: Oval
Party	Candidate	Votes	%	±%
Liberal Democrats	Marietta Crichton-Stuart	1,412		
Liberal Democrats	John Feenan	1,267		
Liberal Democrats	Andrew Sawdon	1,261		
Labour	Elizabeth Atkinson	1,053		
Labour	Stephen Beer	925		
Labour	John Hayes	404		
Conservative	John Taylor	404		
Conservative	Christopher Sinclair	230		
Conservative	Robert Halfon	190		
Socialist (GB)	Anne Hollifield	166		
Turnout				
Liberal Democrats hold		Swing		
Liberal Democrats hold		Swing		
Liberal Democrats hold		Swing		

=== 1994 election ===
The election took place on 5 May 1994.

1994 Lambeth London Borough Council election: Oval
Party	Candidate	Votes	%	±%
Liberal Democrats	Marietta Crichton-Stuart	1,896		
Liberal Democrats	Adrian Mayer	1,693		
Liberal Democrats	Andrew Sawdon	1,590		
Labour	Colin Adkins	1,064		
Labour	Rupert Bawden	1,054		
Labour	Ambrose Hogan	967		
Militant Labour	Steven Nally	310		
Conservative	Andrew Selous	279		
Conservative	Harriet Selous	260		
Conservative	Andrew Dunnett	254		
Green	Martin Wilks	236		
Independent	Ray Close	50		
Turnout				
Liberal Democrats gain from Labour		Swing		
Liberal Democrats gain from Labour		Swing		
Liberal Democrats gain from Labour		Swing		

=== 1993 by-election ===
A by-election took place on 22 July 1993, following the resignation of Joseph Singh.

1993 Oval by-election
Party	Candidate	Votes	%	±%
Liberal Democrats	Marietta Crichton-Stuart	1,506		
Labour	Peter O'Connell	858		
Militant Labour	Steven Nally	246		
Conservative	Andrew Selous	229		
Green	Jason Evers	56		
Turnout				
Liberal Democrats gain from Labour		Swing		

=== 1990 election ===
The election took place on 3 May 1990.

1990 Lambeth London Borough Council election: Oval
Party	Candidate	Votes	%	±%
Labour	Janet Crook	1,790		
Labour	Alison Higgs	1,718		
Labour	Joseph Singh	1,564		
Conservative	John Pattman	873		
Conservative	Clifford Grantham	870		
Conservative	Renee Straker	807		
Green	Henry Bewley	420		
SDP	David Chamberlain	358		
SDP	Raymond Woolford	351		
Liberal Democrats	Susan Bussell	304		
Liberal Democrats	Richard Hardman	270		
Liberal Democrats	Suresh Patel	231		
Turnout				
Labour hold		Swing		
Labour hold		Swing		
Labour hold		Swing		

=== 1986 election ===
The election took place on 8 May 1986.

1986 Lambeth London Borough Council election: Oval
Party	Candidate	Votes	%	±%
Labour	Janet Crook	1,725		
Labour	Robert Colenutt	1,632		
Labour	Marilyn Evers	1,618		
Alliance	Mike Tuffrey	1,492		
Alliance	Bruce Darrington	1,357		
Alliance	Suresh Patel	1,261		
Conservative	Richard Oses	568		
Conservative	Martin Taylor	562		
Conservative	Mary Starling	545		
National Front	Barry Freestone	69		
National Front	William Young	60		
Turnout				
Labour hold		Swing		
Labour hold		Swing		
Labour hold		Swing		

=== 1982 election ===
The election took place on 6 May 1982.

1982 Lambeth London Borough Council election: Oval
Party	Candidate	Votes	%	±%
Labour	Janet Boateng	1,126		
Labour	John Quinn	1,085		
Labour	Elsie Horstead	1,026		
Alliance	Charles Burch	970		
Alliance	Wilfred Juniper	950		
Alliance	David Stimpson	929		
Conservative	Joseph Egerton	849		
Conservative	Edward Bickham	849		
Conservative	Lavender Taylor	818		
Turnout				
Labour hold		Swing		
Labour hold		Swing		
Labour hold		Swing		

=== 1978 election ===
The election took place on 4 May 1978.

1978 Lambeth London Borough Council election: Oval
Party	Candidate	Votes	%	±%
Labour	Elsie Horstead	1,367		
Labour	John Quinn	1,363		
Labour	David Stimpson	1,348		
Conservative	Thomas Ashmore	986		
Conservative	Francis Vallis	975		
Conservative	David Price	965		
National Front	Mark Austin	258		
National Front	Richard O'Sullivan	212		
National Front	Vera Lillington	211		
Turnout				
Labour win (new boundaries)				
Labour win (new boundaries)				
Labour win (new boundaries)				

== 1964–1978 Lambeth council elections ==
=== 1974 election ===
The election took place on 2 May 1974.

1974 Lambeth London Borough Council election: Oval
Party	Candidate	Votes	%	±%
Labour	E. Carr	1,572		
Labour	W. Juniper	1,560		
Labour	T. Sparrow	1,534		
Conservative	M. Bedford	602		
Conservative	F. Vallis	597		
Conservative	H. Flight	577		
Turnout				
Labour hold		Swing		
Labour hold		Swing		
Labour hold		Swing		

=== 1971 election ===
The election took place on 13 May 1971.

1971 Lambeth London Borough Council election: Oval
Party	Candidate	Votes	%	±%
Labour	E. Carr	2,409		
Labour	W. Juniper	2,405		
Labour	T. Sparrow	2,381		
Conservative	J. Inglis	825		
Conservative	J. Smith	799		
Conservative	F. Vallis	764		
Turnout				
Labour gain from Conservative		Swing		
Labour gain from Conservative		Swing		
Labour gain from Conservative		Swing		

=== 1968 election ===
The election took place on 9 May 1968.

1968 Lambeth London Borough Council election: Oval
Party	Candidate	Votes	%	±%
Conservative	M. Becker	1,308	54.6	+32.0
Conservative	L. Burton	1,270		
Conservative	J. Smith	1,240		
Labour	J. Boyle	1,089	45.4	−32.0
Labour	W. Brownett	1,076		
Labour	F. Chesher	1,061		
Turnout		2,427	22.4	+4.5
Registered electors		10,835		−9.5
Conservative gain from Labour		Swing	+32.0	
Conservative gain from Labour		Swing	+32.0	
Conservative gain from Labour		Swing	+32.0	

=== 1964 election ===
The election took place on 7 May 1964.

1964 Lambeth London Borough Council election: Oval
Party	Candidate	Votes	%	±%
Labour	W. Brownett	1,645	77.4	
Labour	G. Brownless	1,641		
Labour	W. Burrett	1,640		
Conservative	E. Hart	479	22.6	
Conservative	T. Taylor	473		
Conservative	M. Straw	470		
Turnout		2,137	17.9	
Registered electors		11,966		
Labour win (new seat)				
Labour win (new seat)				
Labour win (new seat)				
