= Brixton Acre Lane =

- Electoral ward for the Lambeth London Borough Council
- Brixton Acre Lane ward boundaries since 2022
- Borough: Lambeth
- County: Greater London
- Population: 15,252 (2021) (Note: 2021 Census data reported for 2022 ward boundaries)
- Electorate: 11,108 (2022)
- Major settlements: Brixton
- Area: 1.052 square kilometres (0.406 sq mi)

Current electoral ward
- Created: 2022
- Number of members: 3
- Councillors: Maria Kay; David Bridson; Sarbaz Barznji
- GSS code: E05014095

Brixton Acre Lane is an electoral ward in the London Borough of Lambeth. The ward was first used in the 2022 elections. It returns three councillors to Lambeth London Borough Council.

== List of councillors ==
Term	Councillor	Party
2022–present	Maria Kay	Labour Co-op
2022–present	David Bridson	Labour Co-op
2022–present	Sarbaz Barznji	Labour Co-op

== Lambeth council elections ==
=== 2022 election ===
The election took place on 5 May 2022.

2022 Lambeth London Borough Council election: Brixton Acre Lane (3)
Party	Candidate	Votes	%	±%
Labour Co-op	Maria Kay	1,812	57.5	
Labour Co-op	David Bridson	1,751	55.6	
Labour Co-op	Sarbaz Barznji	1,747	55.4	
Green	Katy Martin	805	25.5	
Green	William Eaves	568	18.0	
Green	Dan Rad	510	16.2	
Women's Equality	Janet Baker	365	11.6	
Conservative	Shirley Cosgrave	346	11.0	
Conservative	Abidemi Babalola	339	10.8	
Liberal Democrats	Heather Glass	327	10.4	
Conservative	Vernon De Maynard	322	10.2	
Liberal Democrats	Joanna Pycroft	251	8.0	
Liberal Democrats	Charles Jenkins	234	7.4	
TUSC	Theo Sharieff	78	2.5	
Turnout		3,271	29.4	
Labour win (new seat)				
Labour win (new seat)				
Labour win (new seat)				
