= Lambeth London Borough Council =

Local authority in Greater London, England

- Coat of arms

- Council logo

Type
- Type: London borough council of the London Borough of Lambeth
- Houses: Unicameral

Leadership
- Mayor: Paul Valentine, Green since 27 May 2026
- Leader: Martin Abrams, Green since 1 June 2026
- Chief Executive: Ian Davis since 24 March 2025

Structure
- Seats: 63 councillors
- Political groups: Administration (28) Green (28) Other parties (35) Labour (26) Liberal Democrats (9)
- Length of term: Whole council elected every four years

Elections
- Voting system: Plurality at-large (FPTP)
- Last election: 7 May 2026
- Next election: 2 May 2030

Meeting place
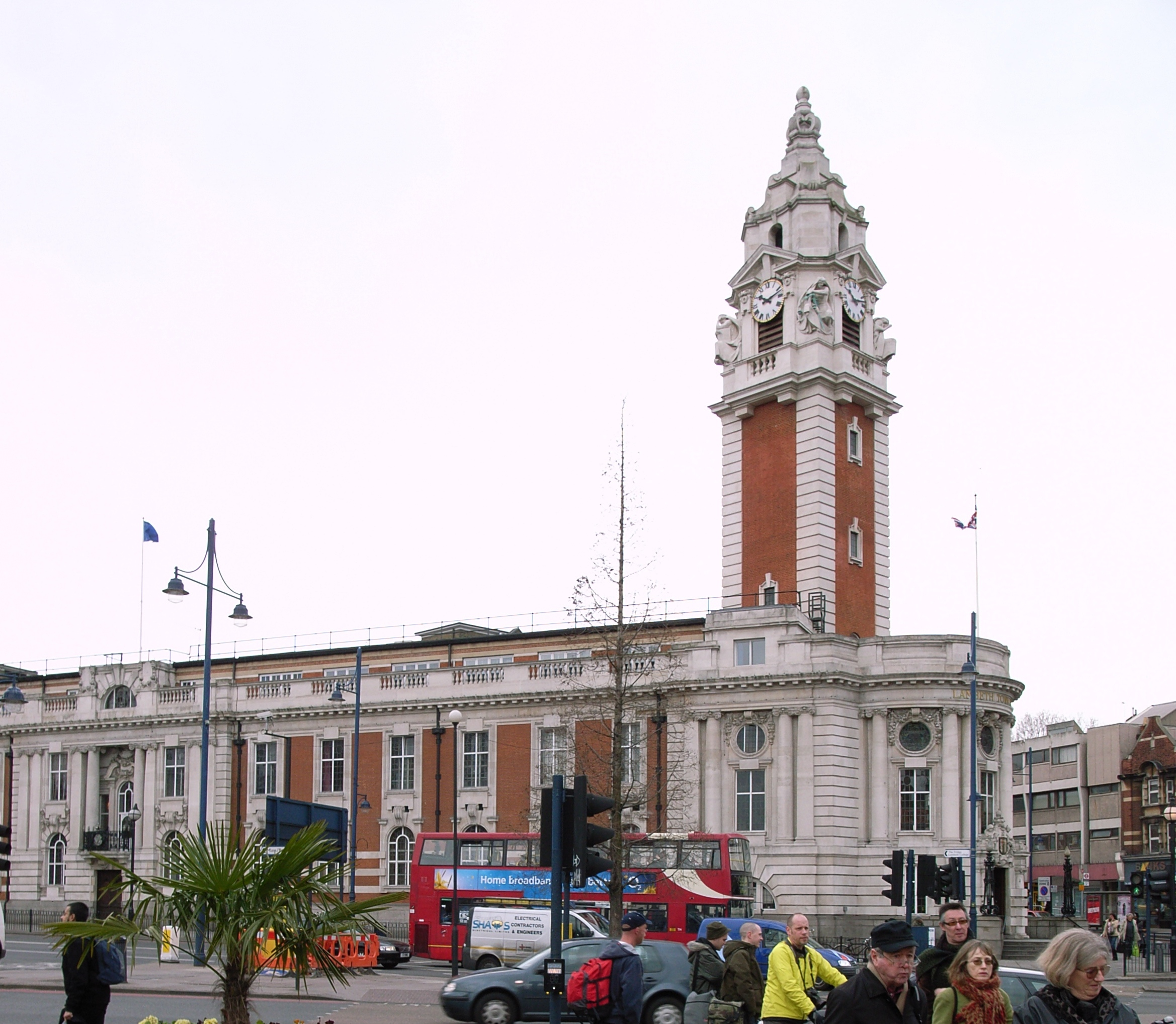
- Lambeth Town Hall, Brixton Hill, London, SW2 1RW

Website
- www.lambeth.gov.uk

Lambeth London Borough Council, which styles itself as Lambeth Council, is the local authority for the London Borough of Lambeth in Greater London, England. The council is responsible for providing specified services within the borough.

In May 2026, after 20 years under Labour majority control, no party has overall control of the council and the Green Party has the most seats. The Green Party now form a minority, single party administration. The council meets at Lambeth Town Hall in Brixton and has its main offices at the nearby Civic Centre.

== History ==
There has been an elected Lambeth local authority since 1856 when the vestry of the ancient parish of Lambeth was incorporated under the Metropolis Management Act 1855. The vestry served as one of the lower tier authorities within the area of the Metropolitan Board of Works, which was established to provide services across the metropolis of London. In 1889 the Metropolitan Board of Works' area was made the County of London. In 1900 the lower tier was reorganised into metropolitan boroughs, each with a borough council, which saw the parish of Lambeth become the Metropolitan Borough of Lambeth.

The larger London Borough of Lambeth and its council were created under the London Government Act 1963, with the first election held in 1964. For its first year the council acted as a shadow authority alongside the area's two outgoing authorities, being the councils of the two metropolitan boroughs of Lambeth and Wandsworth (the latter only in respect of the Clapham and Streatham areas that were to be transferred to the new Lambeth borough). The new council formally came into its powers on 1 April 1965, at which point the old boroughs and their councils were abolished.

The council's full legal name is the "Mayor and Burgesses of the London Borough of Lambeth".

From 1965 until 1986 the council was a lower-tier authority, with upper-tier functions provided by the Greater London Council. The split of powers and functions meant that the Greater London Council was responsible for "wide area" services such as fire, ambulance, flood prevention, and refuse disposal; with the boroughs (including Lambeth) responsible for "personal" services such as social care, libraries, cemeteries and refuse collection. The Greater London Council was abolished in 1986 and its functions passed to the London Boroughs, with some services provided through joint committees. Lambeth became a local education authority in 1990 when the Inner London Education Authority was dissolved.

In 1979, the administration of Edward ("Red Ted") Knight organised the borough's first public demonstration against the Thatcher government.

In 1985, the council joined other left-wing councils in a rate-capping rebellion, although only Liverpool and Lambeth refused to set a legal budget. All 34 Labour councillors present voted on 7 March 1985 not to set a rate. On 9 September 1985 the district auditor for Lambeth gave notice that the delay in fixing the rates was wilful misconduct and so the councillors were required to repay the £126,947 costs as a surcharge. The amount per councillor was over £2,000 and therefore they were also disqualified from office. The surcharged councillors from Lambeth appealed against the surcharges. The High Court delivered its judgment on 6 March 1986, finding heavily against the councils; Lord Justice Glidewell described the stance of the councillors as "mere political posturing"; Mr Justice Caulfield described the evidence of wilful misconduct as "crushing" and the councillors' stance as having "reached a pinnacle of political perversity". The councillors were disqualified on 30 March.

In 1991, Joan Twelves' administration failed to collect the poll tax and opposed the Gulf War. The following year, Twelves and 12 other councillors were suspended from the local Labour Party by regional officials for advocating non-payment of the poll tax and other ideas. During this period, Lambeth became known the archetype of what critics described as a "loony left" council.

Since 2000 the Greater London Authority has taken some responsibility for highways and planning control from the council, but within the English local government system the council remains a "most purpose" authority in terms of the available range of powers and functions.

In July 2021 the Independent Inquiry into Child Sexual Abuse published a report that was highly critical of the council and which said serious abuse had been allowed to occur in five of Lambeth's children's homes, including Cumberlow Lodge, between the 1960s and 1990s; over 700 children had suffered cruelty and sexual abuse, although the Inquiry believed that the figure was likely to be significantly higher. The Inquiry found that a "culture of cover-up" had led to the abuse continuing over decades; the Council made an "unreserved apology to the victims".

Lambeth Council has faced significant criticism over their failure to deliver affordable housing and to properly administer housing they own and manage. Like a number of local authorities, in 2017, it set up a wholly owned company—Homes for Lambeth—to build new housing in the borough. An independent report commissioned by the council by Bob Kerslake, former head of the Civil Service, reported in 2022 that the delivery of new homes in the borough had been "very poor" and recommended closing the company, which Lambeth accepted.

In 2023, the Housing Ombudsman opened an investigation into the council's housing provision following numerous incidents judged by the ombudsmen to be "severe maladministration" and stated they needed to "radically improve". Michael Gove, then minister for the Department for Levelling Up, Housing and Communities, stated that Lambeth Council's behaviour towards residents was "completely unacceptable" and fell below "the most basic level of decency" owed to tenants. Following further investigations, the Housing Ombudsman accepted that Lambeth had made improvements, but "too many residents" still get "an unacceptable service" from the council. Lambeth Council was also the first local authority housing provider to become the subject of an in-person inspection from the Housing Ombudsman over repeated failures to properly handle complaints from tenants and residents.

In 2024, Lambeth Council was criticised for trying to force residents into non-disclosure agreements when settling complaints from leaseholders overcharged for repairs, building works and service charges.

In June 2024 the CEO of Lambeth Council, Bayo Dosunmu, was charged by the police with possession of a Class A drug, failing to stop after a road accident, driving above the proscribed alcohol limit and using a motor vehicle in a public place without third party insurance. He subsequently resigned from his £190,000 a year job. Subsequently, in July 2024, the Director for Adult Social Care at the Council, Fiona Connolly became the Acting Chief Executive.

In December 2024, Lambeth Council’s Appointments Committee recommended that Ian Davis, formerly the Chief Executive of Enfield Council, be appointed as the council’s new Chief Executive.

== Governance ==
The local authority derives its powers and functions from the London Government Act 1963 and subsequent legislation, and has the powers and functions of a London borough council. It sets council tax and as a billing authority it also collects precepts for Greater London Authority functions and business rates. It sets planning policies which complement Greater London Authority and national policies, and decides on almost all planning applications accordingly. It is also the local education authority.

=== Political control ===
The first election was held in 1964, initially operating as a shadow authority alongside the outgoing authorities until it came into its powers on 1 April 1965. Political control of the council since 1965 has been as follows:

Party in control	Years
Labour	1965–1968
Conservative	1968–1971
Labour	1971–1982
No overall control	1982–1986
Labour	1986–1994
No overall control	1994–1998
Labour	1998–2002
No overall control	2002–2006
Labour	2006–2026
No overall control	2026–present

=== Leadership ===
The role of Mayor of Lambeth is largely ceremonial. Political leadership is instead provided by the leader of the council. The leaders since 1965 have been:

Councillor	Party	From	To
Archie Cotton	Labour	1965	1968
Bernard Perkins	Conservative	1968	1971
Charles Dryland	Labour	1971	1973
David Stimpson	Labour	1973	1978
Ted Knight	Labour	1978	26 May 1982
Robin Pitt	Conservative	26 May 1982	Nov 1982
Ted Knight	Labour	Nov 1982	1986
Linda Bellos	Labour	1986	1988
Dick Sorabji	Labour	1988	1989
Joan Twelves	Labour	1989	1993
Steve Whaley	Labour	1993	1994
No leader		1994	1998
Jim Dickson	Labour	1998	2000
Tom Franklin	Labour	2000	May 2002
Peter Truesdale	Liberal Democrats	23 May 2002	May 2006
Steve Reed	Labour	24 May 2006	3 Dec 2012
Lib Peck	Labour	30 Jan 2013	13 Feb 2019
Jack Hopkins	Labour	13 Feb 2019	2 Jun 2021
Claire Holland	Labour	2 Jun 2021	May 2026
Martin Abrams	Green	1 Jun 2026	Incumbent

In 1986, Linda Bellos was the second Black woman to become leader of a British local authority, after Merle Amory in the London Borough of Brent.

=== Composition ===
Following the 2026 election, and two subsequent resignations as of May 2026, the composition of the council is:

Party	Councillors
Green	28
Labour	26
Liberal Democrats	9
Total	63

The next full council election is due in May 2030.

== Elections ==
Since the last boundary changes in 2022 the council has comprised 63 councillors representing 25 wards, with each ward electing two or three councillors. Elections are held every four years. The wards are:

- Brixton Acre Lane (3)
- Brixton North (3)
- Brixton Rush Common (3)
- Brixton Windrush (2)
- Clapham Common and Abbeville (2)
- Clapham East (2)
- Clapham Park (3)
- Clapham Town (3)
- Gipsy Hill (2)
- Herne Hill and Loughborough Junction (3)
- Kennington (3)
- Knight's Hill (3)
- Myatt's Fields (2)
- Oval (3)
- St Martin's (2)
- Stockwell East (2)
- Stockwell West and Larkhall (3)
- Streatham Common and Vale (3)
- Streatham Hill East (2)
- Streatham Hill West and Thornton (2)
- Streatham St Leonard's (3)
- Streatham Wells (2)
- Vauxhall (3)
- Waterloo and South Bank (2)
- West Dulwich (2)

== Premises ==
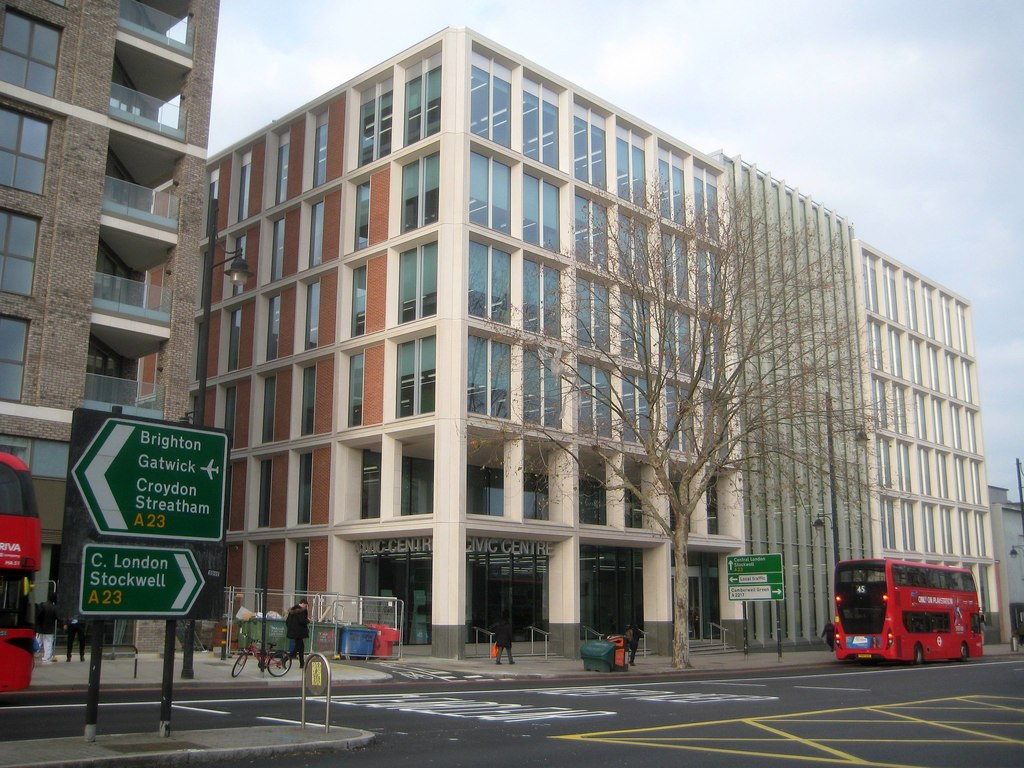
Lambeth Civic Centre, 6 Brixton Hill, London, SW2 1EG: Council's main offices since 2018

The council meets at Lambeth Town Hall on Brixton Hill in Brixton, which was completed in 1908 for the old Lambeth Borough Council. The council's main offices are at Lambeth Civic Centre at 6 Brixton Hill, a short distance south of the Town Hall. The civic centre was purpose-built for the council and opened in 2018.

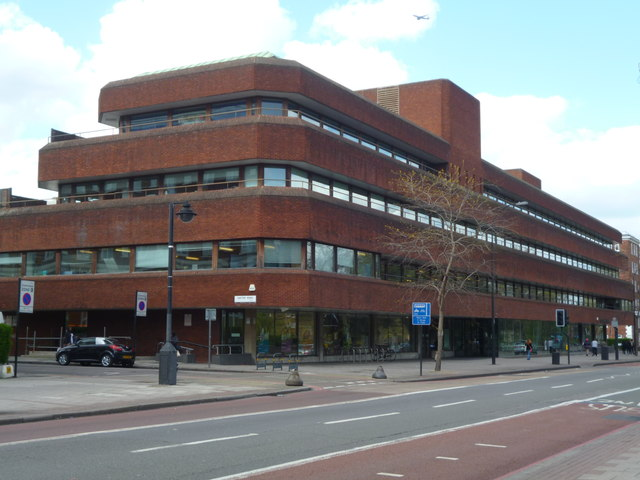
Olive Morris House, 18 Brixton Hill: Council's offices 1978–2018, since demolished

The civic centre replaced the council's previous main offices at 18 Brixton Hill, which had been built in 1978 and was named 'Olive Morris House' in 1986 after Olive Morris (1952–1979), a local community leader and activist.

== Notable councillors ==
=== Green Party ===
- Jonathan Bartley, councillor for St Leonard's ward between 2018 and 2022, former Co-Leader of the Green Party.
- Scott Ainslie, councillor for St Leonard's ward since 2014 and MEP for London from 2019 to 2020.

=== Liberal Democrats ===
- Anthony Bottrall, former British diplomat and councillor for Stockwell ward from 1994 to 2006.
- Roger Liddle, British political adviser and member of House of Lords, and councillor for Prince's ward from 1982 to 1986 and 1994 to 1995.
- Mike Tuffrey, former member of the GLC and London Assembly, and councillor for Prince's ward from 1990 to 2002.

=== Conservative Party ===
- John Bercow, former councillor for St Leonard's ward (1986–1990) and Speaker of the House of Commons from 2009 to 2019.
- Charlie Elphicke, former councillor for Gipsy Hill (1994–1998) and Member of Parliament for Dover from 2010 to 2019.
- John Major, former councillor for Ferndale ward (1968–1971) and Prime Minister of the United Kingdom from 1990 to 1997.

=== Labour Party ===
- Ibrahim Dogus, councillor for Bishop's ward since 2018 and entrepreneur and restaurateur.
- Jim Dickson, councillor for Herne Hill and former Leader of Lambeth Council and Member of Parliament for Dartford since 2024.
- Steve Reed, former councillor for Brixton Hill (2006–2012) and Member of Parliament for Croydon North since 2012.
- Florence Eshalomi, former councillor for Brixton Hill (2010–2018), Member of the London Assembly (2016–2021) and Member of Parliament for Vauxhall since 2019.
- Marsha de Cordova, former councillor for Larkhall ward (2014–2018) and Member of Parliament for Battersea since 2017.
- Dan Sabbagh, former councillor for Vassall ward (1999-2004) and associate editor of The Guardian newspaper.
- Kitty Ussher, former councillor for Vassall ward (1998–2002) and former Member of Parliament for Burnley (2005–2010).
- Jonathan Myerson, former councillor for Clapham Town (2002–2006).
- Tom Rutland, former councillor for Streatham Common and Vale from 2022 to 2024.
