= 1986 Lambeth London Borough Council election =

1986 local election in England

The 1986 Lambeth London Borough Council election took place on 8 May 1986. All 64 members of Lambeth London Borough Council were elected. The elections took place alongside local elections in the other London boroughs and elections to local authorities across the United Kingdom.

In the 1986 elections, the Labour Party won 40 seats (up 8 from 1982), the Conservative Party won 21 (down 6), and the SDP–Liberal Alliance won 3 (down 2). Turnout was 43.0%.

Before the 1986 election, the district auditor had identified losses due to the late setting of council rates as part of the rate-capping rebellion, and surcharged the relevant councillors (half of the total), disqualifying them from office and barring them from standing again for five years. This reduced the Labour Group on the council from the 32 elected in 1982 to 3 going into the election.

== Election result ==
Lambeth local election result 1986
Party	Seats	Gains	Losses	Net gain/loss	Seats %	Votes %	Votes	+/−
Labour	40			+8	62.5	43.6		
Conservative	21			-6	32.8	32.9		
Alliance	3			-2	4.7	20.2		

== Ward results ==
=== Angell ===
Angell (3)
Party	Candidate	Votes	%	±%
Labour	Lesley Hammond	2,049		
Labour	Stephen French	2,013		
Labour	David Morgan	1,886		
Conservative	Constance HoImes	499		
Conservative	Frederick HoImes	488		
Conservative	Paul Williamson	446		
Alliance	Maureen Green	317		
Alliance	Christopher Berry	311		
Alliance	David Warner	278		
Turnout				
Labour hold		Swing		
Labour hold		Swing		
Labour hold		Swing		

=== Bishop's ===
Bishop's (3)
Party	Candidate	Votes	%	±%

=== Clapham Park ===
Clapham Park (3)
Party	Candidate	Votes	%	±%

=== Clapham Town ===
Clapham Town (3)
Party	Candidate	Votes	%	±%

=== Ferndale ===
Ferndale (3)
Party	Candidate	Votes	%	±%

=== Gipsy Hill ===
Gipsy Hill (3)
Party	Candidate	Votes	%	±%

=== Herne Hill ===
Herne Hill (3)
Party	Candidate	Votes	%	±%

=== Knight's Hill ===
Knight's Hill (3)
Party	Candidate	Votes	%	±%

=== Larkhall ===
Larkhall (3)
Party	Candidate	Votes	%	±%

=== Oval ===
Oval (3)
Party	Candidate	Votes	%	±%
Labour	Janet Crook	1,725		
Labour	Robert Colenutt	1,632		
Labour	Marilyn Evers	1,618		
Alliance	Mike Tuffrey	1,492		
Alliance	Bruce Darrington	1,357		
Alliance	Suresh Patel	1,261		
Conservative	Richard Oses	568		
Conservative	Martin Taylor	562		
Conservative	Mary Starling	545		
National Front	Barry Freestone	69		
National Front	William Young	60		
Turnout				
Labour hold		Swing		
Labour hold		Swing		
Labour hold		Swing		

=== Prince's ===
Prince's (3)
Party	Candidate	Votes	%	±%

=== St Leonard's ===
St Leonard's (3)
Party	Candidate	Votes	%	±%
Conservative	Mary Leigh	1,803		
Conservative	John Bercow	1,753		
Conservative	Hugh Jones	1,714		
Labour	Amanda Caulfield	995		
Labour	Raymond Chant	948		
Labour	Elizabeth White	924		
Liberal	Helen Bailey	886		
Liberal	Sheila Clarke	843		
Liberal	Alan Leaman	824		
Majority		719		
Turnout			47.7	
Conservative hold		Swing		
Conservative hold		Swing		
Conservative hold		Swing		

=== St Martin's ===
St Martin's (3)
Party	Candidate	Votes	%	±%

=== Stockwell ===
Stockwell (3)
Party	Candidate	Votes	%	±%
Labour	Henry Bottomley	1,515		
Labour	Janet Boston	1,433		
Labour	Brian Hodge	1,371		
Alliance	P. Mitchell	1,059		
Alliance	A. Davis	1,048		
Alliance	G. Watson	931		
Conservative	A. Cooper	603		
Conservative	V. Taylor	550		
Conservative	L. Peachey	524		
Turnout				
Labour hold		Swing		

=== Streatham Hill ===
Streatham Hill (3)
Party	Candidate	Votes	%	±%

=== Streatham South ===
Streatham South (3)
Party	Candidate	Votes	%	±%

=== Streatham Wells ===
Streatham Wells (3)
Party	Candidate	Votes	%	±%

=== Thornton ===
Thornton (2)
Party	Candidate	Votes	%	±%

=== Thurlow Park ===
Thurlow Park (2)
Party	Candidate	Votes	%	±%

=== Town Hall ===
Town Hall (3)
Party	Candidate	Votes	%	±%

=== Tulse Hill ===
Tulse Hill (3)
Party	Candidate	Votes	%	±%

=== Vassall ===
Vassall (3)
Party	Candidate	Votes	%	±%
