= 1994 Lambeth London Borough Council election =

- 5 May 1994

All 64 council seats up for election to Lambeth London Borough Council 33 seats needed for a majority
- Registered: 174,828
- Turnout: 75,189, 43.01% (▼2.88)

	First party	Second party
Leader	Stephen P. Whaley	Unknown
Party	Labour	Liberal Democrats
Leader since	1993	Unknown
Leader's seat	Herne Hill (lost) (Note: swapped to contest the Gipsy Hill ward but lost that election)	Unknown
Last election	40 seats, 48.30%	4 seats, 11.36%
Seats before	36 (Note: 9 members had the whip withdrawn but still vote with the group)	9
Seats won	24	24
Seat change	▼12	▲15
Popular vote	72,736	67,009
Percentage	36.37%	33.51%
Swing	▼11.93	▲22.15
	Third party	Fourth party
Leader	Unknown	N/A
Party	Conservative	Independent
Leader since	Unknown	N/A
Leader's seat	Unknown	N/A
Last election	20 seats, 35.72%	0 seats, 0.05%
Seats before	17 (Note: in February 1994, there were 18 Conservative councillors at the election but the conservative candidate that held the seat stood as an independent at the election)	1
Seats won	16	0
Seat change	▼1	▼1
Popular vote	52,689	430
Percentage	26.35%	0.21%
Swing	▼9.37	▲0.16
Council control before election
No Overall Control
Council control after election
No Overall Control

Elections to Lambeth London Borough Council were held in May 1994. Turnout was 43.01%.

== Election result ==
Lambeth local election result 1994
Party	Seats	Gains	Losses	Net gain/loss	Seats %	Votes %	Votes	+/−
Labour	24	4	16	▼12	37.50	36.37	72,736	▼11.93
Liberal Democrats	24	15	0	▲15	37.50	33.51	67,009	▲22.15
Conservative	16	4	5	▼1	25.00	26.35	52,689	▼9.37
Green	0	0	0	Steady	0.00	1.62	3,243	▼2.52
Independent Democrat	0	0	1	▼1	0.00	1.44	2,882	New
Militant Labour	0	0	0	Steady	0.00	0.48	957	New
Independent	0	0	1	▼1	0.00	0.21	430	▲0.16
Communist	0	0	0	Steady	0.00	0.02	47	▼0.09
Total	64						199,993	

== Ward results ==
(*) - Indicates an incumbent candidate

(†) - Indicates an incumbent candidate standing in a different ward

=== Angell ===
Angell (3)
Party	Candidate	Votes	%	±%
Labour	Catherine Ashley^{†} (Note: Ashley was a sitting councillor representing the Bishop's ward)	1,188	44.79	▼11.88
Labour	Charles Fairbank	1,079		
Labour	Stephen Cooley	1,075		
Independent Democrat	Raymond Woolford* (Note: Woodford was originally elected as a Liberal Democrat to replace Cllr Tuite after his resignation in 1993. However he had the lib dem whip removed prior to the election)	673	22.88	New
Independent Democrat	Angela Butler	528		
Independent Democrat	Thomas Butler	506		
Liberal Democrats	Sandra Lawman	506	18.98	New
Liberal Democrats	Smarajit Roy	461		
Liberal Democrats	Marcus Czarnecki	449		
Green	Susan Black	192	7.72	▼7.60
Conservative	Sheila Angel	165	5.63	▼12.38
Conservative	Hector Helden	136		
Conservative	Barbara Winbourne	118		
Registered electors		7,381		▼274
Turnout		2,666	36.12	▲1.07
Rejected ballots		6	0.23	▲0.04
Labour hold				
Labour hold				
Labour gain from Independent Democrat				

=== Bishop's ===
Bishop's (3)
Party	Candidate	Votes	%	±%
Liberal Democrats	Sally Prentice* (Note: Prentice replaced Cllr Nicholas after his death in 1993)	1,787	56.94	▲44.57
Liberal Democrats	Peter Truesdale	1,599		
Liberal Democrats	Gilbert Williams	1,573		
Labour	Pauline Anderson	1,027	33.79	▼22.34
Labour	Marilyn Evers*	961		
Labour	Amelia Brett	956		
Conservative	Charles Holt	144	4.76	▼17.83
Conservative	William Kendall	144		
Conservative	Peter Wilde	127		
Independent Democrat	Linda Stacey	84	2.89	New
Communist	Martin Marriott	47	1.62	New
Registered electors		7,189		▼351
Turnout		3,097	43.08	▲2.18
Rejected ballots		2	0.06	▼0.07
Liberal Democrats gain from Labour				
Liberal Democrats gain from Labour				
Liberal Democrats hold				

=== Clapham Park ===
Clapham Park (3)
Party	Candidate	Votes	%	±%
Labour	Ruth Ling	1,435	38.54	▲2.94
Labour	Jonathan Roberts	1,394		
Labour	Shelagh Webb	1,357		
Conservative	Rodney Parker*	1,351	37.24	▼6.24
Conservative	Amrita Parker*	1,348		
Conservative	Rodney Shakespeare*	1,346		
Liberal Democrats	Yvonne-Michelle James	938	24.23	▲16.45
Liberal Democrats	Joyce Young	860		
Liberal Democrats	Colin Kolb	834		
Registered electors		8,920		▲112
Turnout		3,972	44.53	▼3.19
Rejected ballots		2	0.05	▼0.16
Labour gain from Conservative				
Labour gain from Conservative				
Labour gain from Conservative				

=== Clapham Town ===
Clapham Town (3)
Party	Candidate	Votes	%	±%
Labour	Joseph Callinan*	1,327	36.87	▼8.44
Conservative	Bernard Gentry	1,314	36.06	▼0.40
Labour	Michael English*	1,251		
Labour	Desmond Hall*	1,240		
Conservative	Andrew Hayes	1,222		
Conservative	John Swannick	1,198		
Liberal Democrats	Jason Canty	967	27.08	▲19.66
Liberal Democrats	Maria Gardner-Brown	938		
Liberal Democrats	James Manning	900		
Registered electors		8,185		▲361
Turnout		3,763	45.97	▼3.17
Rejected ballots		5	0.13	▼0.05
Labour hold				
Conservative gain from Labour				
Labour hold				

=== Ferndale ===
Ferndale (3)
Party	Candidate	Votes	%	±%
Labour	Denis Cooper-King*	1,453	51.29	▼8.66
Labour	John Harrison^{†} (Note: Harrison was a sitting councillor representing the St Martin's ward)	1,432		
Labour	Timothy Murnaghan	1,407		
Liberal Democrats	Lindsay Avebury	743	23.66	▼13.49
Liberal Democrats	Pavel Pinkava	625		
Liberal Democrats	John Siraut	612		
Conservative	Alison Davis	353	10.97	▼6.76
Green	Penelope Shepherd	300	10.75	▼1.41
Conservative	Marc Longe	288		
Conservative	James Pollard	277		
Independent Democrat	Mary Clark	134	3.33	New
Independent Democrat	Lesley Peters	83		
Independent Democrat	Phyllis Nono	61		
Registered electors		8,633		▼153
Turnout		2,858	33.11	▼5.45
Rejected ballots		6	0.21	▼0.06
Labour hold				
Labour hold				
Labour hold				

=== Gipsy Hill ===
Gipsy Hill (3)
Party	Candidate	Votes	%	±%
Conservative	Janet Grigg	1,551	41.48	▲3.04
Conservative	David Green	1,540		
Conservative	Charles Elphicke	1,510		
Labour	Stephen Whaley^{†} (Note: Whaley was a sitting councillor representing the Herne Hill ward)	1,287	34.45	▼8.03
Labour	Marion Schumann^{†} (Note: Schumann was a sitting councillor representing the Tulse Hill ward)	1,268		
Labour	Peter Mountford-Smith^{†} (Note: Mountford-Smith was a sitting Councillor representing the Vassall ward)	1,266		
Liberal Democrats	Margaret Pickstone	666	17.55	▲8.27
Liberal Democrats	John Medway	648		
Liberal Democrats	Andrew McClorry	632		
Green	John Parham	241	6.52	▼3.28
Registered electors		8,696		▼203
Turnout		3,857	44.35	▼6.67
Rejected ballots		1	0.03	▼0.15
Conservative gain from Labour				
Conservative gain from Labour				
Conservative gain from Labour				

=== Herne Hill ===
Herne Hill (3)
Party	Candidate	Votes	%	±%
Labour	James Dickinson*	1,649	43.73	▼1.77
Labour	Andrew Roe	1,534		
Labour	Peter O'Connell	1,500		
Conservative	Russel A'Court	1,227	33.00	▲0.93
Conservative	Laurence Smith	1,156		
Conservative	Graham Pycock	1,150		
Liberal Democrats	Andrew Gifford	466	12.24	▲3.70
Liberal Democrats	Emma Hewett	465		
Liberal Democrats	Andrew Truslove	381		
Green	Simon Grant	333	9.33	▼4.56
Independent Democrat	Thomas Lackey	61	1.71	New
Registered electors		7,692		▼222
Turnout		3,573	46.45	▼1.84
Rejected ballots		7	0.20	▼0.10
Labour hold				
Labour hold				
Labour hold				

=== Knight's Hill ===
Knight's Hill (3)
Party	Candidate	Votes	%	±%
Conservative	Peter Evans*	1,554	44.73	▲3.53
Conservative	Hugh Chambers^{†} (Note: Chambers was a sitting councillor representing the Streatham Wells ward)	1,547		
Conservative	Jonathan Driver	1,516		
Labour	William Hynes	1,222	33.28	▼4.08
Labour	Lloyd Leon	1,136		
Labour	John Ohen	1,078		
Liberal Democrats	Helen Kemp	800	22.00	▲12.76
Liberal Democrats	Malcolm Baines	783		
Liberal Democrats	Manjula Roy	687		
Registered electors		9,157		▲46
Turnout		3,865	42.21	▼7.15
Rejected ballots		6	0.16	▲0.05
Conservative hold				
Conservative hold				
Conservative hold				

=== Larkhall ===
Larkhall (3)
Party	Candidate	Votes	%	±%
Labour	Margaret Jones	1,277	45.88	▼11.88
Labour	Elizabeth Tapsell*	1,136		
Liberal Democrats	Maurice Cronly	1,121	42.68	▲34.31
Labour	Joan Twelves*	1,115		
Liberal Democrats	Patrick Mitchell	1,088		
Liberal Democrats	Roger Stewart	1.074		
Conservative	Innes Fleming	261	9.52	▼12.53
Conservative	Tanya Galbraith	236		
Conservative	John Pattman	234		
Independent Democrat	Jean Slatter	52	1.91	New
Independent Democrat	Helen Thompson	48		
Independent Democrat	Mae Roxburgh	46		
Registered electors		8,198		▲830
Turnout		2,880	35.13	▼4.38
Rejected ballots		7	0.24	▼0.04
Labour hold				
Labour hold				
Liberal Democrats gain from Labour				

=== Oval ===
Oval (3)
Party	Candidate	Votes	%	±%
Liberal Democrats	Marietta Crichton Stuart* (Note: Chrichton Stuart replaced Cllr Singh after his resignation in 1993)	1,896	47.76	▲40.28
Liberal Democrats	Adrian Mayer	1,693		
Liberal Democrats	Andrew Sawdon	1,590		
Labour	Colin Adkins	1,064	28.44	▼18.74
Labour	Rupert Bawden	1,054		
Labour	Ambrose Hogan	967		
Militant Labour	Steven Nally	310	8.58	New
Conservative	Andrew Selous	279	7.30	▼16.42
Conservative	Harriet Selous	260		
Conservative	Andrew Dunnett	254		
Green	Martin Wilks	236	6.53	▼5.19
Independent Democrat	Ray Close	50	1.38	New
Registered electors		7,979		▼224
Turnout		3,596	45.07	▲3.99
Rejected ballots		4	0.11	▼0.04
Liberal Democrats hold				
Liberal Democrats gain from Labour				
Liberal Democrats gain from Labour				

=== Prince's ===
Prince's (3)
Party	Candidate	Votes	%	±%
Liberal Democrats	Michael Tuffrey*	1,782	62.23	▲17.33
Liberal Democrats	Roger Liddle*	1,736		
Liberal Democrats	Keith Fitchett	1,663		
Labour	Peter Garvey	835	28.83	▼3.73
Labour	Michael Leyland	794		
Labour	Raymond Chant	770		
Conservative	Paul Giles	204	7.10	▼6.47
Conservative	Jeremy Galbraith	193		
Conservative	Elizabeth Gibson	193		
Independent Democrat	Anita Coleman	51	1.83	New
Registered electors		6,139		▼130
Turnout		2,952	48.09	▼3.99
Rejected ballots		4	0.14	▼0.01
Liberal Democrats hold				
Liberal Democrats hold				
Liberal Democrats hold				

=== St Leonard's ===
St Leonard's (3)
Party	Candidate	Votes	%	±%
Conservative	David Griffiths*	1,448	43.79	▼5.17
Conservative	Hugh Jones*	1,378		
Conservative	Nicholas McKay	1,339		
Liberal Democrats	Robert Doyle	1,142	34.10	▲25.86
Liberal Democrats	Jeremy Halley	1,079		
Liberal Democrats	Rajnikant Patel	1,022		
Labour	Nicoal Billington	741	22.11	▼11.00
Labour	Peter Simpson	700		
Labour	Mohammed Abu-Bakr	663		
Registered electors		7,934		▲54
Turnout		3,502	44.13	▼0.98
Rejected ballots		10	0.29	▲0.09
Conservative hold				
Conservative hold				
Conservative hold				

=== St Martin's ===
St Martin's (3)
Party	Candidate	Votes	%	±%
Labour	Thomas Franklin	1,221	37.96	▼5.34
Conservative	Anthony Green* (Note: Green replaced Cllr Smith after her resignation in 1991)	1,179	37.05	▼0.55
Labour	Toren Smith	1,168		
Conservative	Richard Coombs	1,143		
Labour	Donatus Anyanwu	1,133		
Conservative	Peter Cannon	1,117		
Liberal Democrats	Vivienne Baines	545	16.62	▲7.04
Liberal Democrats	John Waite	504		
Liberal Democrats	Henry Ward	494		
Independent	David Gardiner	162	5.23	New
Independent	Irene Hawkins	97	3.14	New
Registered electors		7,459		▼587
Turnout		3,232	43.33	▼2.01
Rejected ballots		2	0.06	▼0.14
Labour hold				
Conservative hold				
Labour hold				

=== Stockwell ===
Stockwell (3)
Party	Candidate	Votes	%	±%
Liberal Democrats	Christopher Barker	1,560	48.24	▲40.25
Liberal Democrats	Alan Bevan	1,495		
Liberal Democrats	Anthony Bottrall	1,457		
Labour	Simon Adams* (Note: Adams replaced Cllr Mallett after his resignation in 1992)	1,041	32.23	▼20.55
Labour	Janet Crook^{†} (Note: Crook was a sitting councillor representing the Oval ward)	1,008		
Labour	John McCay*	967		
Conservative	Keith Best	492	14.05	▼13.92
Conservative	Syed Kamall	424		
Conservative	Richard Patient	399		
Green	Peter Crush	123	3.94	▼8.02
Independent Democrat	Mercy Afari	48	1.54	New
Registered electors		7,249		▲45
Turnout		3,287	45.34	▲1.52
Rejected ballots		4	0.12	▼0.01
Liberal Democrats gain from Labour				
Liberal Democrats gain from Labour				
Liberal Democrats gain from Labour				

=== Streatham Hill ===
Streatham Hill (3)
Party	Candidate	Votes	%	±%
Liberal Democrats	John Badescu* (Note: Badescu replaced Cllr Hutchens after her resignation in 1993)	2,087	54.44	▲41.55
Liberal Democrats	Jeremy Coninx* (Note: Coninx replaced Cllr Sharvill after his resignation in 1992)	2,079		
Liberal Democrats	David Trott	1,964		
Labour	Patrick Byrne	792	20.30	▼12.97
Labour	Clare Moore	790		
Conservative	John Bloomfield	763	19.61	▼23.22
Conservative	Kenneth Graham	726		
Conservative	Steven Stanbury	718		
Labour	Amanda Waring	703		
Green	Andrew Keen	212	5.65	▼5.36
Registered electors		8,968		▼79
Turnout		3,973	44.30	▼5.78
Rejected ballots		5	0.13	▼0.05
Liberal Democrats hold				
Liberal Democrats hold				
Liberal Democrats hold				

=== Streatham South ===
Streatham South (3)
Party	Candidate	Votes	%	±%
Conservative	Simon Hooberman*	1,834	48.83	▲0.52
Conservative	Edward Castle*	1,822		
Conservative	Anthony Bays*	1,810		
Labour	Andrew Hill	1,330	34.17	▼1.45
Labour	Amanda Morgan	1,251		
Labour	Michael Correa	1,244		
Liberal Democrats	Valerie Collins	687	16.99	▲8.42
Liberal Democrats	Paul James	608		
Liberal Democrats	Irene Yarwood	608		
Registered electors		8,127		▼53
Turnout		4,039	49.70	▼1.59
Rejected ballots		5	0.12	▼0.09
Conservative hold				
Conservative hold				
Conservative hold				

=== Streatham Wells ===
Streatham Wells (3)
Party	Candidate	Votes	%	±%
Liberal Democrats	Julian Heather*	1,972	46.05	▲14.69
Liberal Democrats	Daphne Hayes-Mojon	1,877		
Liberal Democrats	Michael Young	1,842		
Conservative	Robert Greenwood*	1,214	28.60	▼3.45
Conservative	Richard Hope	1,171		
Conservative	Gianfranco Letizia	1,149		
Labour	Robert Hill	836	19.54	▼8.96
Labour	Shirley Hill	826		
Labour	Esme Hilliard	752		
Green	Richard Coles	239	5.80	▼2.29
Registered electors		9,619		▲28
Turnout		4,319	44.90	▼4.94
Rejected ballots		10	0.23	▲0.17
Liberal Democrats gain from Conservative				
Liberal Democrats hold				
Liberal Democrats gain from Conservative				

=== Thornton ===
Thornton (2)
Party	Candidate	Votes	%	±%
Liberal Democrats	Maltby Pindar	1,244	39.26	▲33.40
Liberal Democrats	David Warner	1,204		
Labour	Rudolph Daley*	1,065	33.26	▼9.14
Labour	Ty Goddard	1,009		
Conservative	Roger Bennett	718	22.00	▼21.62
Conservative	Oliver Lodge	653		
Independent	Ronald Bird*	171	5.48	New
Registered electors		5,886		▲140
Turnout		3,202	54.40	▼0.93
Rejected ballots		8	0.25	▲0.09
Liberal Democrats gain from Independent				
Liberal Democrats gain from Labour				

=== Thurlow ===
Thurlow Park (2)
Party	Candidate	Votes	%	±%
Conservative	Clare Whelan*	1,402	55.72	▲2.44
Conservative	John Whelan*	1,364		
Liberal Democrats	Maureen Mele	593	23.73	▲13.30
Liberal Democrats	Andrew Thurburn	585		
Labour	Ian Darby	524	20.55	▼7.07
Labour	Noshirwan Patel	496		
Registered electors		5,375		▼98
Turnout		2,662	49.53	▼4.35
Rejected ballots		5	0.19	▲0.09
Conservative hold				
Conservative hold				

=== Town Hall ===
Town Hall (3)
Party	Candidate	Votes	%	±%
Labour	Geraldine Curtis	1,647	47.45	▼2.49
Labour	Geoffrey Wilkinson*	1,637		
Labour	Christopher Cattermole* (Note: Cattermole replaced Cllr Sorabji after his resignation in 1991)	1,623		
Conservative	Egbert Christie	736	21.03	▼7.29
Conservative	John Baron	735		
Liberal Democrats	Elsie Binder	706	18.18	▲11.60
Conservative	Roger Barnes	705		
Liberal Democrats	Duncan Brack	596		
Liberal Democrats	Henry Young	580		
Green	Rogert Baker	460	13.34	▼1.82
Registered electors		9,053		▲60
Turnout		3,531	39.00	▼6.19
Rejected ballots		3	0.08	▼0.17
Labour hold				
Labour hold				
Labour hold				

=== Tulse Hill ===
Tulse Hill (3)
Party	Candidate	Votes	%	±%
Labour	Daniel Hughes	1,651	45.02	▼8.27
Labour	David Salisbury-Jones	1,525		
Labour	Pauline Watson^{†} (Note: Watson was a sitting councillor representing the Vassall ward)	1,486		
Militant Labour	Anne Hollifield	647	18.74	New
Liberal Democrats	Lucy Gilbert	513	14.28	▲5.42
Liberal Democrats	Laura Morland	485		
Liberal Democrats	Timothy Evans	481		
Green	Paulka Watson	393	9.59	▼6.62
Conservative	Anthony Jones	390	10.14	▼5.16
Conservative	Deborah Green	347		
Conservative	Charles Lidell-Grainger	313		
Green	William Collins	268		
Independent Democrat	Catherine Valentine	77	2.23	New
Registered electors		8,091		▲290
Turnout		3,140	38.81	▼3.68
Rejected ballots		10	0.32	▲0.14
Labour hold				
Labour hold				
Labour hold				

=== Vassall ===
Vassall (3)
Party	Candidate	Votes	%	±%
Liberal Democrats	John Denny	1,375	43.27	▲37.64
Liberal Democrats	Geoffrey Bowring	1,359		
Liberal Democrats	Brian Jennings	1,303		
Labour	Benn Eshun	1,195	36.13	▼21.00
Labour	Stephen Glazier	1,113		
Labour	Alexander McKenna	1,065		
Conservative	Judith Pattman	274	8.61	▼16.27
Conservative	Anthony Shakespeare	271		
Conservative	Henrietta Royle	259		
Green	Tean Mitchell	246	7.91	▼4.45
Independent Democrat	Stephen Chamberlain	144	4.08	New
Independent Democrat	James Diaper	124		
Independent Democrat	George Anagnos	112		
Registered electors		8,898		▼313
Turnout		3,223	36.22	▼2.60
Rejected ballots		2	0.06	Steady
Liberal Democrats gain from Labour				
Liberal Democrats gain from Labour				
Liberal Democrats gain from Labour				
