= 1978 Lambeth London Borough Council election =

The 1978 Lambeth London Borough Council election to the Lambeth London Borough Council was held in May 1978. The whole council was up for election. Turnout was 33.4%.

== Election result ==
Lambeth local election result 1978
| Party | Seats | Gains | Losses | Net gain/loss | Seats % | Votes % | Votes | +/− |
|---|---|---|---|---|---|---|---|---|
| Labour | 42 | | | -14 | 65.6 | 48.5 | | |
| Conservative | 22 | | | +8 | 34.4 | 46.5 | | |
| Liberal | 0 | 0 | 0 | 0 | 0.0 | 2.7 | | |

== Ward results ==
=== Angell ===
Angell (3)
| Party | Candidate | Votes | % | ±% |
|---|---|---|---|---|
| Labour | Hugh Griffiths | 1,178 | | |
| Labour | Lesley Hammond | 1,171 | | |
| Labour | Paul Moore | 1,155 | | |
| Conservative | Maureen Clarke | 534 | | |
| Conservative | David Palmer | 479 | | |
| Conservative | Richard Walsh | 450 | | |
| National Front | Clifford Holland | 105 | | |
| National Front | Philip Turner | 101 | | |
| National Front | Catherine Williams | 93 | | |
| West Indian Block | Cynthia Tyrell | 48 | | |
| West Indian Block | Kenneth Dixon | 45 | | |
| West Indian Block | Andrew Bloomfield | 34 | | |
| Turnout | | | | |
| Labour hold | | Swing | | |
| Labour hold | | Swing | | |
| Labour hold | | Swing | | |

=== Bishop's ===
Bishop's (3)
| Party | Candidate | Votes | % | ±% |

=== Clapham Park ===
Clapham Park (3)
| Party | Candidate | Votes | % | ±% |

=== Clapham Town ===
Clapham Town (3)
| Party | Candidate | Votes | % | ±% |

=== Ferndale ===
Ferndale (3)
| Party | Candidate | Votes | % | ±% |

=== Gipsy Hill ===
Gipsy Hill (3)
| Party | Candidate | Votes | % | ±% |

=== Herne Hill ===
Herne Hill (3)
| Party | Candidate | Votes | % | ±% |

=== Knight's Hill ===
Knight's Hill (3)
| Party | Candidate | Votes | % | ±% |

=== Larkhall ===
Larkhall (3)
| Party | Candidate | Votes | % | ±% |

=== Oval ===
Oval (3)
| Party | Candidate | Votes | % | ±% |
|---|---|---|---|---|
| Labour | Elsie Horstead | 1,367 | | |
| Labour | John Quinn | 1,363 | | |
| Labour | David Stimpson | 1,348 | | |
| Conservative | Thomas Ashmore | 986 | | |
| Conservative | Francis Vallis | 975 | | |
| Conservative | David Price | 965 | | |
| National Front | Mark Austin | 258 | | |
| National Front | Richard O'Sullivan | 212 | | |
| National Front | Vera Lillington | 211 | | |
| Turnout | | | | |
| Labour win (new boundaries) | | | | |
| Labour win (new boundaries) | | | | |
| Labour win (new boundaries) | | | | |

=== Prince's ===
Prince's (3)
| Party | Candidate | Votes | % | ±% |

=== St Leonard's ===
St Leonard's (3)
| Party | Candidate | Votes | % | ±% |
|---|---|---|---|---|
| Conservative | Andrew Beadle | 2,106 | | |
| Conservative | Peter Cary | 2,058 | | |
| Conservative | Valerio Bogazzi | 2,039 | | |
| Labour | Daniel Black | 874 | | |
| Labour | Andrew Morton | 735 | | |
| Labour | Bernard Lynn | 717 | | |
| Liberal | Sheila Clarke | 202 | | |
| Liberal | Ian D Mason | 169 | | |
| Liberal | Jeffrey Taylor | 144 | | |
| Save London Alliance | Martin Gower | 40 | | |
| Majority | | 1,165 | | |
| Turnout | | | 36.4 | |
| Conservative hold | | Swing | | |
| Conservative hold | | Swing | | |
| Conservative hold | | Swing | | |

=== St Martin's ===
St Martin's (3)
| Party | Candidate | Votes | % | ±% |

=== Stockwell ===
Stockwell (3)
| Party | Candidate | Votes | % | ±% |

=== Streatham Hill ===
Streatham Hill (3)
| Party | Candidate | Votes | % | ±% |

=== Streatham South ===
Streatham South (3)
| Party | Candidate | Votes | % | ±% |

=== Streatham Wells ===
Streatham Wells (3)
| Party | Candidate | Votes | % | ±% |

=== Thornton ===
Thornton (2)
| Party | Candidate | Votes | % | ±% |

=== Thurlow Park ===
Thurlow Park (2)
| Party | Candidate | Votes | % | ±% |

=== Town Hall ===
Town Hall (3)
| Party | Candidate | Votes | % | ±% |

=== Tulse Hill ===
Tulse Hill (3)
| Party | Candidate | Votes | % | ±% |

=== Vassall ===
Vassall (3)
| Party | Candidate | Votes | % | ±% |
