= Clapham Park (ward) =

Electoral ward in London, England

- Electoral ward for the Lambeth London Borough Council
- Clapham Park ward boundaries since 2022
- Borough: Lambeth
- County: Greater London
- Population: 11,056 (2021) (Note: 2021 Census data reported for 2022 ward boundaries)
- Electorate: 9,740 (2022))
- Major settlements: Clapham Park
- Area: 0.9195 square kilometres (0.3550 sq mi)

Current electoral ward
- Created: 1965–2002 (first creation); 2022 (second creation)
- Number of members: 3
- Councillors: Verity McGivern; Martin Tiedemann; Michael Ball
- Created from: Brixton Hill, Clapham Common, Streatham Hill and Thornton in 2022
- GSS code: E05014101 (2022–present)

Clapham Park is an electoral ward in the London Borough of Lambeth. The ward was originally created in 1965 and abolished in 2002. It was created again for the 2022 elections. It returns three councillors to Lambeth London Borough Council.

== List of councillors ==
Term	Councillor	Party
1964–1968	Thomas Rowlands	Conservative
1964–1968; 1974–1977	George Hickmore	Conservative
1964–1971	Enzio Righelato	Conservative
1968–1971	Jack Ebling	Conservative
1968–1971	M. Brown	Conservative
1971–1974	C. Clegg	Labour
1971–1974	G. Smith	Labour
1971–1974	P. Biddlecombe	Labour
1974–1975	John Blackwell	Conservative
1974–1978	M. Duffy	Labour
1975–1978	Stephen Beaven	Conservative
1977–1986	Charles Williams	Conservative
1978–1982	George Whyte	Conservative
1978–1982	Peter Dean	Labour
1982–1986	Marisa Momn	Conservative
1982–1994	Rodney Parker	Conservative
1986–1990	Cecilia Motley	Conservative
1986–1990	Rodney Motley	Conservative
1990–1994	Rodney Shakespeare	Conservative
1994–2002	Ruth Ling	Labour
1994–1998	Jonathan Roberts	Labour
1994–1998	Shelagh Webb	Labour
1998–2002	Roland Doven	Labour
1998–2002	Martin McEwan	Labour
2022–present	Verity McGivern	Labour Co-op
2022–2026	Irfan Mohammed (Note: Irfan Mohammed was a councillor for Ferndale ward from 2013 to 2022.)	Labour Co-op
2022–2026	Irfan Mohammed	Independent
2022–present	Martin Tiedemann (Note: Martin Tiedemann was a councillor for Brixton Hill ward from 2013 to 2022.)	Labour Co-op
2026–present	Michael Ball	Green

== Lambeth council elections since 2022 ==
=== 2026 by-election ===
The by-election took place on 9 July 2026, following the resignation of Joanna Eaves.

2026 Clapham Park by-election
Party	Candidate	Votes	%	±%
Green	Michael Ball	842		
Labour Co-op	Louie Somerville-Sutherland	799		
Liberal Democrats	Ben Amos	108		
Conservative	Joshua Forrester	85		
Reform	Martin Read	71		
CPA	Jehwo Kehinde	12		
Socialist (GB)	Anya Krycek	6		
Turnout				
Green hold		Swing		

=== 2026 election ===
The election took place on 7 May 2026.

2026 Lambeth London Borough Council election: Clapham Park
Party	Candidate	Votes	%	±%
Labour Co-op	Verity Mcgivern	1,285	14	
Labour Co-op	Martin Tiedemann	1,158	13	
Green	Joanna Eaves	1,154	13	
Labour Co-op	Louie Somerville-Sutherland	1,117	13	
Green	Yannis Baur	1,033	12	
Green	David James	938	11	
Liberal Democrats	Ben Amos	364	4	
Liberal Democrats	Karen Hautz	312	4	
Conservative	Shirley Grace Cosgrave	308	3	
Liberal Democrats	Donal Kane	262	3	
Conservative	Lee Stuart Rotherham	259	3	
Reform	Martin Read	235	3	
Conservative	Leila Yasin Abdi Yaasen	205	2	
Independent	Harry O'Donoghue	202	2	
SDP	Sandy Mcdougall	38	0	
Turnout				
Registered electors		9,436		
Labour Co-op hold		Swing		
Labour Co-op hold		Swing		
Green gain from Labour Co-op		Swing		

=== 2022 election ===
The election took place on 5 May 2022.

2022 Lambeth London Borough Council election: Clapham Park
Party	Candidate	Votes	%	±%
Labour Co-op	Verity McGivern	1,545	64.6	
Labour Co-op	Irfan Mohammed	1,416	59.2	
Labour Co-op	Martin Tiedemann	1,361	56.9	
Green	Joanna Eaves	574	24.0	
Green	Cath Potter	424	17.7	
Green	Myka-Neil Cooper-Levitan	405	16.9	
Conservative	Edward Brushwood	303	12.7	
Conservative	Lavinia Cartwright	286	12.0	
Liberal Democrats	Anthony Gilmour	239	10.0	
Conservative	Martin Read	231	9.7	
Liberal Democrats	Thomas Newitt	207	8.7	
Liberal Democrats	Henry McMorrow	186	7.8	
Turnout		2,497	25.6	
Labour Co-op win (new seat)				
Labour Co-op win (new seat)				
Labour Co-op win (new seat)				

== 1978–2002 Lambeth council elections ==
Clapham Park ward boundaries from 1978 to 2002

There was a revision of ward boundaries in Lambeth in 1978.

=== 1998 election ===
The election on 7 May 1998 took place on the same day as the 1998 Greater London Authority referendum.

1998 Lambeth London Borough Council election: Clapham Park
Party	Candidate	Votes	%	±%
Labour	Ruth Ling	1,527	44.55	▲6.01
Labour	Roland Doven	1,392		
Labour	Martin McEwan	1,378		
Liberal Democrats	Darren Sanders	1,154	34.00	▲9.77
Liberal Democrats	Matthew Bryant	1,120		
Liberal Democrats	Clive Gross	1,005		
Conservative	Richard Bassett	698	21.45	▼15.79
Conservative	Gianfranco Letizia	691		
Conservative	Richard Forsdyke	680		
Registered electors		9,585		▲665
Turnout		3,506	36.58	▼7.95
Rejected ballots		38	1.08	▲1.03
Labour hold		Swing		
Labour hold		Swing		
Labour hold		Swing		

=== 1994 election ===
The election took place on 5 May 1994.

1994 Lambeth London Borough Council election: Clapham Park
Party	Candidate	Votes	%	±%
Labour	Ruth Ling	1,435	38.54	▲2.94
Labour	Jonathan Roberts	1,394		
Labour	Shelagh Webb	1,357		
Conservative	Rodney Parker	1,351	37.24	▼6.24
Conservative	Amrita Parker	1,348		
Conservative	Rodney Shakespeare	1,346		
Liberal Democrats	Yvonne-Michelle James	938	24.23	▲16.45
Liberal Democrats	Joyce Young	860		
Liberal Democrats	Colin Kolb	834		
Registered electors		8,920		▲112
Turnout		3,972	44.53	▼3.19
Rejected ballots		2	0.05	▼0.16
Labour gain from Conservative		Swing		
Labour gain from Conservative		Swing		
Labour gain from Conservative		Swing		

=== 1990 election ===
The election took place on 3 May 1990.

1990 Lambeth London Borough Council election: Clapham Park
Party	Candidate	Votes	%	±%
Conservative	Rodney Shakespeare	1,888	43.48	
Conservative	Rodney Parker	1,837		
Conservative	Amrita Parker	1,791		
Labour	Colin Bryant	1,573	35.60	
Labour	Christopher Cattermole	1,517		
Labour	Suhail Aziz	1,429		
Green	David Kemball-Cook	556	13.14	
Liberal Democrats	Ann Watson	358	7.78	
Liberal Democrats	Simon Wales	327		
Liberal Democrats	Andrew Loader	303		
Registered electors		8,808		
Turnout		4,208	47.77	
Rejected ballots		9	0.21	
Conservative hold		Swing		
Conservative hold		Swing		
Conservative hold		Swing		

=== 1986 election ===
The election took place on 8 May 1986.

1986 Lambeth London Borough Council election: Clapham Park
Party	Candidate	Votes	%	±%
Conservative	Cecilia Motley	1,898		
Conservative	Rodney Motley	1,832		
Conservative	Rodney Parker	1,794		
Labour	Philip Mason	1,753		
Labour	Michael Burton	1,719		
Labour	Mark Stone	1,641		
Alliance	Arthur Capel	738		
Alliance	Ernest Randall	706		
Alliance	Cella Thomas	683		
Turnout				
Conservative hold		Swing		
Conservative hold		Swing		
Conservative hold		Swing		

=== 1982 election ===
The election took place on 6 May 1982.

1982 Lambeth London Borough Council election: Clapham Park
Party	Candidate	Votes	%	±%
Conservative	Charles Williams	1,914		
Conservative	Marisa Momn	1,838		
Conservative	Rodney Parker	1,833		
Labour	Peter Dean	1,343		
Labour	Nicholas Butler	1,223		
Labour	Joan Parine	1,209		
Alliance	John Stephen	1,201		
Alliance	Polly Toynbee	1,173		
Alliance	Christine Headley	1,162		
Turnout				
Conservative hold		Swing		
Conservative hold		Swing		
Conservative gain from Labour		Swing		

=== 1978 election ===
The election took place on 4 May 1978.

1978 Lambeth London Borough Council election: Clapham Park
Party	Candidate	Votes	%	±%
Conservative	Charles Williams	2,020		
Conservative	George Whyte	1,970		
Labour	Peter Dean	1,911		
Conservative	Stephen Beaven	1,887		
Labour	Hugh Walker	1,856		
Labour	Peter O'Connell	1,810		
Liberal	Tim Clement-Jones	368		
Liberal	Christine Jones	302		
Liberal	Dorothy Venables	278		
Turnout				
Conservative win (new boundaries)				
Conservative win (new boundaries)				
Labour win (new boundaries)				

== 1964–1978 Lambeth council elections ==
External images
- Clapham Park ward boundaries from 1965 to 1978 (west)
- Clapham Park ward boundaries from 1965 to 1978 (east)

=== 1977 by-election ===
The by-election took place on 17 March 1977, following the death of George Hickmore.

1977 Clapham Park by-election
Party	Candidate	Votes	%	±%
Conservative	Charles Williams	1,580		
Labour	Peter Dean	916		
Liberal	Tim Clement-Jones	390		
National Front	Colin Skeats	215		
Turnout			29.3	
Conservative hold		Swing		

=== 1975 by-election ===
The by-election took place on 16 October 1975, caused by the resignation of John Blackwell.

1975 Clapham Park by-election
Party	Candidate	Votes	%	±%
Conservative	Stephen Beaven	1,578		
Labour	Joan Parine	1,050		
Liberal	Tim Clement-Jones	403		
Turnout			27.6	
Conservative hold		Swing		

=== 1974 election ===
The election took place on 2 May 1974.

1974 Lambeth London Borough Council election: Clapham Park
Party	Candidate	Votes	%	±%
Conservative	George Hickmore	1,803		
Conservative	John Blackwell	1,800		
Labour	M. Duffy	1,798		
Labour	H. Walker	1,777		
Conservative	C. Jones	1,751		
Labour	Joan Parine	1,732		
Liberal	Tim Clement-Jones	452		
Liberal	H. Venables	356		
Liberal	J. Marrin	343		
Communist	B. Bunting	172		
Turnout				
Conservative gain from Labour		Swing		
Conservative gain from Labour		Swing		
Labour hold		Swing		

=== 1971 election ===
The election took place on 13 May 1971.

1971 Lambeth London Borough Council election: Clapham Park
Party	Candidate	Votes	%	±%
Labour	C. Clegg	2,267		
Labour	G. Smith	2,207		
Labour	P. Biddlecombe	2,158		
Conservative	A. Blair	2,071		
Conservative	Enzio Righelato	2,007		
Conservative	M. Yuill	1,970		
Independent	M. Kelly	235		
Turnout		12,915		
Labour gain from Conservative		Swing		
Labour gain from Conservative		Swing		
Labour gain from Conservative		Swing		

=== 1968 by-election ===
The by-election took place on 27 June 1968. The by-election followed George Hickmore becoming an alderman on the council.

1968 Clapham Park by-election
Party	Candidate	Votes	%	±%
Conservative	M. Brown	1,341		
Labour	M. Kelly	470		
Liberal	S. Beaven	165		
Turnout			17.6	
Conservative hold		Swing		

=== 1968 election ===
The election took place on 9 May 1968.

1968 Lambeth London Borough Council election: Clapham Park
Party	Candidate	Votes	%	±%
Conservative	George Hickmore	2,509		
Conservative	Enzio Righelato	2,486		
Conservative	Jack Ebling	2,437		
Labour	M. Kelly	1051		
Labour	R. O'Carroll	1006		
Labour	R. Ansell	1004		
Liberal	T. Douglas	235		
Liberal	S. Beaven	231		
Liberal	M. Jouvenat	204		
Union Movement	W. Cheeseman	167		
Turnout				
Conservative hold		Swing		
Conservative hold		Swing		
Conservative hold		Swing		

=== 1964 election ===
The election took place on 7 May 1964.

1964 Lambeth London Borough Council election: Clapham Park
Party	Candidate	Votes	%	±%
Conservative	Thomas Rowlands	1,984	50.5	
Conservative	George Hickmore	1,934		
Conservative	Enzio Righelato	1,885		
Labour	A. Wayman	1,679	42.7	
Labour	G. Hunt	1,666		
Labour	V. Bradley	1,659		
Liberal	P. Hurley	138	3.5	
Independent	T. Barnes	130	3.3	
Liberal	P. Evison	114		
Liberal	F. Monte	108		
Turnout		3,828	32.8	
Registered electors		11,687		
Conservative win (new seat)				
Conservative win (new seat)				
Conservative win (new seat)				
