= St Leonard's (ward) =

Electoral ward in London, England

Coordinates: 51.429°N 0.131°W

- Former electoral ward for the Lambeth London Borough Council
- St Leonard's ward from 2002 to 2022
- Borough: Lambeth
- County: Greater London
- Population: 14,550 (2011)
- Electorate: 11,250 (2018)

Former electoral ward
- Created: 1965
- Abolished: 2022
- Number of members: 3
- Replaced by: Streatham St Leonard's
- GSS code: E05000428

St Leonard's was an electoral ward in the London Borough of Lambeth, United Kingdom. The ward existed from the creation of the borough on 1 April 1965 to May 2022. It was first used in the 1964 elections and last used for the 2018 elections. It returned three councillors to Lambeth London Borough Council. It was replaced by Streatham St Leonard's ward in 2022. Future Speaker of the House of Commons John Bercow served as a councillor here from 1986 to 1990.

== List of councillors ==
Term	Councillor	Party
1964–1968	L. Knowles	Conservative
1964–1968	F. Steere	Conservative
1964–1968	Jack Westbury	Conservative
1968–1974	R. Turtill	Conservative
1968–1974	H. Jellie	Conservative
1968–1982	Valerio Bogazzi	Conservative
1974–1982	Peter Cary	Conservative
1974–1982	Andrew Beadle	Conservative
1982–1986	Iain Picton	Conservative
1986–1990	John Bercow	Conservative
1982–1994	Mary Leigh	Conservative
1982–1998	Hugh Jones	Conservative
1990–1998	David Griffiths	Conservative
1994–1998	Nicholas McKay	Conservative
1998–2014	Roger Giess	Liberal Democrat
1998–2014	Brian Palmer	Liberal Democrat
1998–2014	Clive Bennett	Liberal Democrat
2014–2018	Saleha-Begum Jaffer	Labour
2014–2018	Robert Hill	Labour
2018–2022	Jonathan Bartley	Green
2014–2022	Scott Ainslie	Green
2018–2022	Nicole Griffiths	Green

== Summary ==
Councillors elected by party at each general borough election.

- Conservative
- Liberal Democrats
- Labour
- Green

== 2002–2022 Lambeth council elections ==
St Leonard's ward boundaries from 2002 to 2022

There was a revision of ward boundaries in Lambeth in 2002.

=== 2018 election ===
The election took place on 3 May 2018.

2018 Lambeth London Borough Council election: St Leonard's
Party	Candidate	Votes	%	±%
Green	Scott Ainslie	2,141	48.2	▲18.8
Green	Jonathan Bartley	2,080	–	–
Green	Nicole Griffiths	2,006	–	–
Labour	Saleha Jaffer	1,677	37.7	▲7.6
Labour	Rob Hill	1,676	–	–
Labour	Stephen Donnelly	1,673	–	–
Conservative	Wendy Newall	439	9.9	▼0.8
Conservative	Scott Simmonds	383	–	–
Conservative	Neil Salt	337	–	–
Liberal Democrats	Jennifer Keen	188	4.2	▼18.3
Liberal Democrats	Fiona MacKenzie	159	–	–
Liberal Democrats	Richard Malins	108	–	–
Majority		464	10.5	N/A
Registered electors		11,250		
Turnout		4,461	39.7	▲5.6
Rejected ballots		8	0.2	▼0.7
Green hold		Swing	▲6.1	
Green gain from Labour		Swing	–	
Green gain from Labour		Swing	–	

=== 2014 election ===
The election took place on 22 May 2014.

2014 Lambeth London Borough Council election: St Leonard's
Party	Candidate	Votes	%	±%
Labour	Robert Hill	1,218	30.1	▼1.2
Green	Scott Ainslie	1,191	29.4	▲19.7
Labour	Saleha-Begum Jaffer	1,158	–	–
Labour	Michael Burke	1,125	–	–
Green	Jonathan Bartley	1,124	–	–
Green	Rachel Laurence	921	–	–
Liberal Democrats	Brian Palmer	913	22.5	▼18.9
Liberal Democrats	Roger Giess	738	–	–
Liberal Democrats	Phillip Stanmer	695	–	–
Conservative	Felicity Newall	432	10.7	▼6.9
Conservative	Charley Jarrett	415	–	–
Conservative	Wendy Newall	395	–	–
UKIP	Mark Trasenster	296	7.3	New
Majority		27	0.7	N/A
Registered electors		10,733		
Turnout		3,754	35.0	
Rejected ballots		32	0.9	
Labour gain from Liberal Democrats		Swing	▲5.4	
Green gain from Liberal Democrats		Swing	–	
Labour gain from Liberal Democrats		Swing	–	

=== 2010 election ===
The election took place on 6 May 2010.

2014 Lambeth London Borough Council election: St Leonard's
Party	Candidate	Votes	%	±%
Liberal Democrats	Clive Bennett	2,582		
Liberal Democrats	Brian Palmer	2,197		
Liberal Democrats	Roger Giess	2,031		
Labour	Catherine Harvey	1,948		
Labour	Henry Fergusson	1,904		
Labour	Richard Payne	1,689		
Conservative	Ben Everitt	1,099		
Conservative	Wendy Newall	977		
Conservative	Alastair Hamilton	948		
Green	Rebecca Findlay	603		
Green	Ahmed Ibrahim	328		
Green	Michael Mullins	288		
Majority		83		
Turnout			55.8	
Liberal Democrats hold		Swing		
Liberal Democrats hold		Swing		
Liberal Democrats hold		Swing		

=== 2006 election ===
The election took place on 4 May 2006.

2006 Lambeth London Borough Council election: St Leonard's
Party	Candidate	Votes	%	±%
Liberal Democrats	Clive Bennett	1,454		
Liberal Democrats	Brian Palmer	1,373		
Liberal Democrats	Roger Giess	1,187		
Labour	Robert Hill	615		
Labour	Catherine Harvey	604		
Green	Rebecca Findlay	564		
Labour	Richard Payne	502		
Conservative	Wendy Newall	435		
Conservative	John Bellak	420		
LEAP	Michelle Singleton	409		
Conservative	Stephen McMenamin	398		
Majority		572		
Turnout			28.6	
Liberal Democrats hold		Swing		
Liberal Democrats hold		Swing		
Liberal Democrats hold		Swing		

=== 2002 election ===
The election took place on 2 May 2002.

2002 Lambeth London Borough Council election: St Leonard's
Party	Candidate	Votes	%	±%
Liberal Democrats	Clive Bennett	1,517		
Liberal Democrats	Roger Giess	1,422		
Liberal Democrats	Brian Palmer	1,419		
Labour	Denese Clarke	841		
Labour	Matthew Salter	813		
Labour	Brian Whitington	706		
Green	Anne C Kenner	290		
Conservative	Alastair S Hamilton	284		
Conservative	Nicholas W Walles	280		
Conservative	Philip Murley	250		
Majority		578		
Turnout			28	
Liberal Democrats win (new boundaries)				
Liberal Democrats win (new boundaries)				
Liberal Democrats win (new boundaries)				

== 1978–2002 Lambeth council elections ==
St Leonard's ward boundaries from 1978 to 2002

There was a revision of ward boundaries in Lambeth in 1978.

=== 1998 election ===
The election took place on 7 May 1998.

1998 Lambeth London Borough Council election: St Leonard's
Party	Candidate	Votes	%	±%
Liberal Democrats	Clive Bennett	1,162		
Liberal Democrats	Brian Palmer	1,103		
Liberal Democrats	Roger Giess	1,092		
Labour	Sally Bowdery	727		
Labour	Roger Bowdery	703		
Labour	Brycchan Carey	630		
Conservative	Joanna Barker	618		
Conservative	Andrew Burkinshaw	580		
Conservative	Glyn Kyle	580		
Green	Hugh Fraser	213		
Majority		365		
Turnout			32.1	
Liberal Democrats gain from Conservative		Swing		
Liberal Democrats gain from Conservative		Swing		
Liberal Democrats gain from Conservative		Swing		

=== 1994 election ===
The election took place on 5 May 1994.

1994 Lambeth London Borough Council election: St Leonard's
Party	Candidate	Votes	%	±%
Conservative	David Griffiths	1,448		
Conservative	Hugh Jones	1,378		
Conservative	Nicholas McKay	1,339		
Liberal Democrats	Robert Doyle	1,142		
Liberal Democrats	Jeremy Halley	1,079		
Liberal Democrats	Rajnikant Patel	1,022		
Labour	Nicola Billington	741		
Labour	Peter Simpson	741		
Labour	Mohammed Abu-Bakr	663		
Majority		197		
Turnout			44.1	
Conservative hold		Swing		
Conservative hold		Swing		
Conservative hold		Swing		

=== 1990 election ===
The election took place on 3 May 1990.

1990 Lambeth London Borough Council election: St Leonard's
Party	Candidate	Votes	%	±%
Conservative	David Griffiths	1,740		
Conservative	Mary Leigh	1,726		
Conservative	Hugh Jones	1,670		
Labour	Robert Ballard	1,208		
Labour	Barbara Cawdron	1,163		
Labour	Roger Marshall	1,103		
Green	Thomas Bewley	339		
Liberal Democrats	Sheila Clarke	318		
Liberal Democrats	Pearl Balachandran	277		
Liberal Democrats	Duncan Brack	269		
Majority		462		
Turnout			45.1	
Conservative hold		Swing		
Conservative hold		Swing		
Conservative hold		Swing		

=== 1986 election ===
The election took place on 8 May 1986.

1986 Lambeth London Borough Council election: St Leonard's
Party	Candidate	Votes	%	±%
Conservative	Mary Leigh	1,803		
Conservative	John Bercow	1,753		
Conservative	Hugh Jones	1,714		
Labour	Amanda Caulfield	995		
Labour	Raymond Chant	948		
Labour	Elizabeth White	924		
Liberal	Helen Bailey	886		
Liberal	Sheila Clarke	843		
Liberal	Alan Leaman	824		
Majority		719		
Turnout			47.7	
Conservative hold		Swing		
Conservative hold		Swing		
Conservative hold		Swing		

=== 1982 election ===
The election took place on 6 May 1982.

1982 Lambeth London Borough Council election: St Leonard's
Party	Candidate	Votes	%	±%
Conservative	Mary Leigh	2,066		
Conservative	Hugh Jones	2,014		
Conservative	Iain Picton	2,009		
SDP	Lee Hughes	804		
Liberal	Keren Lewin	797		
Liberal	Michael Watson	770		
Labour	Roger Bowdery	521		
Labour	Winston Taylor	517		
Labour	Sally Bowdery	513		
Providers Who Care	Alf Hollender	22		
Majority		1,205		
Turnout			44.6	
Conservative hold		Swing		
Conservative hold		Swing		
Conservative hold		Swing		

=== 1978 election ===
The election took place on 4 May 1978.

1978 Lambeth London Borough Council election: St Leonard's
Party	Candidate	Votes	%	±%
Conservative	Andrew Beadle	2,106		
Conservative	Peter Cary	2,058		
Conservative	Valerio Bogazzi	2,039		
Labour	Daniel Black	874		
Labour	Andrew Morton	735		
Labour	Bernard Lynn	717		
Liberal	Sheila Clarke	202		
Liberal	Ian D Mason	169		
Liberal	Jeffrey Taylor	144		
Save London Alliance	Martin Gower	40		
Majority		1,165		
Turnout			36.4	
Conservative win (new boundaries)				
Conservative win (new boundaries)				
Conservative win (new boundaries)				

== 1964–1978 Lambeth council elections ==
External images
- St Leonard's ward boundaries from 1965 to 1978 (west)
- St Leonard's ward boundaries from 1965 to 1978 (east)

=== 1974 election ===
The election took place on 2 May 1974.

1974 Lambeth London Borough Council election: St Leonard's
Party	Candidate	Votes	%	±%
Conservative	Peter Cary	2,293		
Conservative	Andrew Beadle	2,279		
Conservative	Valerio Bogazzi	2,274		
Labour	P. Daley	1,031		
Labour	S. Dimmick	980		
Labour	S. Parry	933		
Liberal	A. Miller	282		
Liberal	E. Kininmonth	267		
Liberal	A. Mitchell	251		
Majority		1,243		
Turnout			31.7	
Conservative hold		Swing		
Conservative hold		Swing		
Conservative hold		Swing		

=== 1971 election ===
The election took place on 13 May 1971.

1971 Lambeth London Borough Council election: St Leonard's
Party	Candidate	Votes	%	±%
Conservative	H. Jellie	2,563		
Conservative	R. Turtill	2,517		
Conservative	Valerio Bogazzi	2,515		
Labour	M. Justice	1,316		
Labour	D. Easto	1,298		
Labour	N. Patel	1,215		
Majority		1,199		
Turnout			32.8	
Conservative hold		Swing		
Conservative hold		Swing		
Conservative hold		Swing		

=== 1968 by-election ===
A by-election took place on 27 June 1968.

1968 St Leonard's by-election
Party	Candidate	Votes	%	±%
Conservative	Valerio Bogazzi	1,837		
Conservative	R. Turtill	1,824		
Liberal	D. Delaney	172		
Labour	S. Gittins	167		
Liberal	K. Phelps	152		
Labour	B. Hargreaves	150		
Independent	Bill Boaks	27		
Turnout			19.0%	
Conservative hold		Swing		
Conservative hold		Swing		

=== 1968 election ===
The election took place on 9 May 1968.

1968 Lambeth London Borough Council election: St Leonard's
Party	Candidate	Votes	%	±%
Conservative	Jack Westbury	3,258		
Conservative	H. Jellie	3,254		
Conservative	M. Steere	3,226		
Labour	B. Hargreaves	619		
Labour	G. Gold	600		
Labour	R. Eadie	597		
Majority		2,607		
Turnout			34.6	
Conservative hold		Swing		
Conservative hold		Swing		
Conservative hold		Swing		

=== 1964 election ===
The election took place on 7 May 1964.

1964 Lambeth London Borough Council election: St Leonard's
Party	Candidate	Votes	%	±%
Conservative	M. Steere	2,330		
Conservative	L. Knowles	2,319		
Conservative	Jack Westbury	2,301		
Labour	J. Roberts	943		
Labour	W. O’Shaughnessy	922		
Labour	S. Gittins	912		
Liberal	D. Mann	297		
Liberal	W. Charles	270		
Liberal	E. Punchard	267		
Majority				
Turnout				
Turnout				
Conservative win (new seat)				
Conservative win (new seat)				
Conservative win (new seat)				
