= Stockwell (ward) =

Coordinates: 51.475°N 0.124°W

- Former electoral ward for the Lambeth London Borough Council
- Stockwell ward boundaries from 2002 to 2022
- Borough: Lambeth
- County: Greater London
- Population: 14,777 (2011)
- Electorate: 11,109 (2018)
- Major settlements: Stockwell
- Area: 0.9 square kilometres (0.35 sq mi) (2002–2022)

Former electoral ward
- Created: 1965
- Abolished: 2022
- Councillors: 3
- Replaced by: Oval, Stockwell East and Stockwell West and Larkhall
- ONS code: 00AYGN (2002–2022)
- GSS code: E05000429 (2002–2022)

Stockwell was an electoral ward in the London Borough of Lambeth from 1965 to 2022. The ward was first used in the 1964 elections and last used for the 2018 elections. It returned three councillors to Lambeth London Borough Council. The boundaries were redrawn in 1978 and 2002. Notable councillors have been Peter Mandelson and Anthony Bottrall.

== List of councillors ==
Seat	Councillor	Took office	Left office	Party	Election
1	Ewan Carr	1964	1968	Labour	1964
2	F. Chesher	1964	1968	Labour	1964
3	Sidney Gurney	1964	1968	Labour	1964
1	D. Gibbons	1968	1971	Conservative	1968
2	M. Tyler	1968	1971	Conservative	1968
3	D. Smith	1968	1971	Conservative	1968
1	Sidney Gurney	1971	1978	Labour	1971, 1974
2	William Hall	1971	1979	Labour	1971, 1974, 1978
3	W. Johnson	1971	1974	Labour	1971
3	Patrick Mitchell	1974	1982	Labour	1974, 1978
1	Paul Ormerod	1978	1986	Labour	1978, 1982
2	Peter Mandelson	1979	1982	Labour	1979
2	Stuart Cakebread	1982	1986	Labour	1982
3	Ian Grant	1982	1986	Labour	1982
1	Henry Bottomley	1986	1990	Labour	1986
2	Janet Boston	1986	1990	Labour	1986
3	Brian Hodge	1986	1990	Labour	1986
1	Joshua Arnold-Forster	1990	1994	Labour	1990
2	John McCay	1990	1994	Labour	1990
3	Ian Mallett	1990	1992	Labour	1990
3	Simon Adams	1992	1994	Labour	1992
1	Christopher Barker	1994	1998	Liberal Democrats	1994
2	Alan Bevan	1994	1998	Liberal Democrats	1994
3	Anthony Bottrall	1994	2006	Liberal Democrats	1994, 1998, 2002
1	Hugh David	1998	2002	Labour	1998
2	Abigail Melville	1998	2002	Labour	1998
1	Marcus Mayers	2002	2006	Liberal Democrats	2002
2	Gabriel Fernandes	2002	2006	Liberal Democrats	2002
1	Peter Bowyer	2006	2014	Labour	2006, 2010
2	Pav Akhtar	2006	2010	Labour	2006
3	Imogen Walker	2006	2018	Labour	2006, 2010, 2014
2	Alex Bigham	2010	2018	Labour	2010, 2014
1	Guilherme Rosa	2014	2018	Labour	2014
1	Lucy Caldicott	2018	2022	Labour	2018
2	Mahamed Hashi	2018	2022	Labour	2018
3	Mohammed Jaser	2018	2022	Labour	2018

== 2002–2022 Lambeth council elections ==
There was a revision of ward boundaries in Lambeth in 2002.

=== 2018 election ===
The election took place on 3 May 2018.

2018 Lambeth London Borough Council election: Stockwell
Party	Candidate	Votes	%	±%
Labour	Lucy Caldicott	2,107		
Labour	Mahamed Hashi	1,828		
Labour	Mohammed Jaser	1,778		
Liberal Democrats	Susanna Flood	598		
Green	Catherine Dawkins	592		
Conservative	Keith Best	521		
Conservative	Sarah Barr	505		
Conservative	Paul Mawdsley	499		
Green	Tom Wood	433		
Liberal Democrats	Andrew Horsler	405		
Liberal Democrats	Andrew Thurburn	373		
Green	Martin Dore	352		
TUSC	Lisa Bainbridge	72		
TUSC	Steven Nally	40		
Duma Polska	Tadeusz Slaski	37		
Labour hold		Swing		
Labour hold		Swing		
Labour hold		Swing		

=== 2014 election ===
The election took place on 22 May 2014.

2014 Lambeth London Borough Council election: Stockwell
Party	Candidate	Votes	%	±%
Labour	Alex Bigham	2,026		
Labour	Imogen Walker	1,778		
Labour	Guilherme Rosa	1,769		
Conservative	Sarah Barr	608		
Liberal Democrats	Anthony Bottrall	552		
Conservative	Craig Barrett	507		
Green	Sam Low	502		
Green	Maritza Tschepp	431		
Conservative	Robert McMillan	430		
Liberal Democrats	Matthew McConnell	416		
Liberal Democrats	Fernanda Correia-Sefzick	380		
Green	David Ville	366		
TUSC	Joana Santos	136		
Total votes		9,901		
Labour hold		Swing		
Labour hold		Swing		
Labour hold		Swing		

=== 2010 election ===
The election on 6 May 2010 took place on the same day as the United Kingdom general election.

2010 Lambeth London Borough Council election: Stockwell
Party	Candidate	Votes	%	±%
Labour	Peter Bowyer	2,701		
Labour	Alex Bigham	2,551		
Labour	Imogen Walker	2,470		
Liberal Democrats	Fernanda Correia-Sefzick	1,768		
Liberal Democrats	Anthony Bottrall	1,765		
Liberal Democrats	Felix Greaves	1,407		
Conservative	Sarah Barr	944		
Conservative	Larissa Dudley	755		
Conservative	Robert McMillan	712		
Green	Teresa Delaney	432		
Green	Rebecca Gibbs	358		
Green	Robert Foxcroft	313		
English Democrat	Janus Polenceus	60		
Total votes		16,236		
Labour hold		Swing		
Labour hold		Swing		
Labour hold		Swing		

=== 2006 election ===
The election took place on 4 May 2006.

2006 Lambeth London Borough Council election: Stockwell
Party	Candidate	Votes	%	±%
Labour	Peter Bowyer	1,565	39.3	
Labour	Pav Akhtar	1,552		
Labour	Imogen Walker	1,513		
Liberal Democrats	Anthony Bottrall	1,321	33.1	
Liberal Democrats	Polly Mackenzie	1,012		
Liberal Democrats	David Hayes	1,010		
Green	Thomas Tibbits	443	11.1	
Conservative	Sarah Barr	416	10.4	
Conservative	Elizabeth Gibson	365		
Conservative	Robert McMillan	331		
Local Education Action by Parents	Tracey Fevrier	241	6.0	
Total votes		9,769		
Labour gain from Liberal Democrats		Swing		
Labour gain from Liberal Democrats		Swing		
Labour gain from Liberal Democrats		Swing		

=== 2002 election ===
The election took place on 2 May 2002.

2002 Lambeth London Borough Council election: Stockwell
Party	Candidate	Votes	%	±%
Liberal Democrats	Anthony Bottrall	1,549	20.6	
Liberal Democrats	Marcus Mayers	1,280	17.0	
Liberal Democrats	Gabriel Fernandes	1,219	16.2	
Labour	Michael English	991	13.2	
Labour	Esther Green	931	12.4	
Labour	Toaha Qureshi	882	11.7	
Green	Peter Crush	260	3.5	
Conservative	Judith Collier	167	2.2	
Conservative	John Midgley	125	1.7	
Conservative	Laura Midgley	124	1.6	
Turnout		7,528	29.3	
Liberal Democrats win (new boundaries)				
Liberal Democrats win (new boundaries)				
Liberal Democrats win (new boundaries)				

== 1978–2002 Lambeth council elections ==
Stockwell ward boundaries from 1978 to 2002

There was a revision of ward boundaries in Lambeth in 1978.

=== 1998 election ===
The election took place on 7 May 1998.

1998 Lambeth London Borough Council election: Stockwell
Party	Candidate	Votes	%	±%
Liberal Democrats	Anthony Bottrall	1,043	41.54	▼6.70
Labour	Hugh David	1,020	41.51	▲9.28
Labour	Abigail Melville	917		
Liberal Democrats	Catherine Cumberbatch-Barnett	884		
Liberal Democrats	Emma Must	844		
Labour	Kamal Paul	832		
Green	James Fraser	207	9.31	▲5.37
Conservative	Keith Best	202	7.63	▼6.42
Conservative	Virginia Taylor	167		
Conservative	Elizabeth Gibson	140		
Registered electors		7,842		▲593
Turnout		2,357	30.06	▼15.28
Rejected ballots		27	1.15	▲1.03
Liberal Democrats hold		Swing		
Labour gain from Liberal Democrats		Swing		
Labour gain from Liberal Democrats		Swing		

=== 1994 election ===
The election took place on 5 May 1994.

1994 Lambeth London Borough Council election: Stockwell
Party	Candidate	Votes	%	±%
Liberal Democrats	Christopher Barker	1,560	48.24	▲40.25
Liberal Democrats	Alan Bevan	1,495		
Liberal Democrats	Anthony Bottrall	1,457		
Labour	Simon Adams	1,041	32.23	▼20.55
Labour	Janet Crook	1,008		
Labour	John McCay	967		
Conservative	Keith Best	492	14.05	▼13.92
Conservative	Syed Kamall	424		
Conservative	Richard Patient	399		
Green	Peter Crush	123	3.94	▼8.02
Independent Democrat	Mercy Afari	48	1.54	New
Registered electors		7,249		▲45
Turnout		3,287	45.34	▲1.52
Rejected ballots		4	0.12	▼0.01
Liberal Democrats gain from Labour				
Liberal Democrats gain from Labour				
Liberal Democrats gain from Labour				

=== 1992 by-election ===
The by-election took place on 10 December 1992, following the resignation of Ian Mallett.

1992 Stockwell by-election
Party	Candidate	Votes	%	±%
Labour	Simon Adams	797		
Liberal Democrats	Gary Woolton	690		
Conservative	Keith Best	566		
Independent	Stephen Bradshaw	22		
Green	Jason Evers	21		
Turnout				
Labour hold		Swing		

=== 1990 election ===
The election took place on 3 May 1990.

1990 Lambeth London Borough Council election: Stockwell
Party	Candidate	Votes	%	±%
Labour	Joshua Arnold-Forster	1,708	52.78	
Labour	John McCay	1,664		
Labour	Ian Mallett	1,606		
Conservative	Ann Bozman	918	27.97	
Conservative	Andrew Elliott	874		
Conservative	Henrietta Royle	846		
Green	Giles Collins	354	11.26	
Liberal Democrats	Christopher Jeffrey	311	7.99	
Liberal Democrats	Clive Pritchard	240		
Liberal Democrats	Peter Truesdale	202		
Registered electors		7,204		
Turnout		3,157	43.82	
Rejected ballots		4	0.13	
Labour hold		Swing		
Labour hold		Swing		
Labour hold		Swing		

=== 1986 election ===
The election took place on 8 May 1986.

1986 Lambeth London Borough Council election: Stockwell
Party	Candidate	Votes	%	±%
Labour	Henry Bottomley	1,515		
Labour	Janet Boston	1,433		
Labour	Brian Hodge	1,371		
Alliance	Patrick Mitchell	1,059		
Alliance	Andrew Davis	1,048		
Alliance	Graham Watson	931		
Conservative	Averil Cooper	603		
Conservative	Virginia Taylor	550		
Conservative	Louise Peachey	524		
Turnout				
Labour hold		Swing		
Labour hold		Swing		
Labour hold		Swing		

=== 1982 election ===
The election took place on 6 May 1982.

1982 Lambeth London Borough Council election: Stockwell
Party	Candidate	Votes	%	±%
Labour	Stuart Cakebread	1,065		
Labour	Ian Grant	1,024		
Labour	Paul Ormerod	1,019		
Alliance	Patrick Mitchell	896		
Alliance	Jennifer Ireland	862		
Alliance	Katharine Philbrick	860		
Conservative	Averil Cooper	660		
Conservative	Peter McDonald	605		
Conservative	Christopher Francis	595		
Turnout				
Labour hold		Swing		
Labour hold		Swing		
Labour hold		Swing		

=== 1979 by-election ===
The by-election took place on 6 December 1979, following the resignation of William Hall.

1979 Stockwell by-election
Party	Candidate	Votes	%	±%
Labour	Peter Mandelson	1,074		
Conservative	Richard Sullivan	423		
Turnout				
Labour hold		Swing		

=== 1978 election ===
The election took place on 4 May 1978.

1978 Lambeth London Borough Council election: Stockwell
Party	Candidate	Votes	%	±%
Labour	William Hall	1,569		
Labour	Patrick Mitchell	1,569		
Labour	Paul Ormerod	1,491		
Conservative	David Rose	791		
Conservative	Peter Whitelaw	772		
Conservative	Selma Shakespear	754		
Turnout				
Labour win (new boundaries)				
Labour win (new boundaries)				
Labour win (new boundaries)				

== 1964–1978 Lambeth council elections ==
External images
- Stockwell ward boundaries from 1965 to 1978 (east)
- Stockwell ward boundaries from 1965 to 1978 (west)

=== 1974 election ===
The election took place on 2 May 1974.

1974 Lambeth London Borough Council election: Stockwell
Party	Candidate	Votes	%	±%
Labour	William Hall	1,983		
Labour	Sidney Gurney	1,960		
Labour	Patrick Mitchell	1,936		
Conservative	N. Lyell	729		
Conservative	Bill Newton Dunn	622		
Conservative	G. Vines	599		
Turnout				
Labour hold		Swing		
Labour hold		Swing		
Labour hold		Swing		

=== 1971 election ===
The election took place on 13 May 1971.

1971 Lambeth London Borough Council election: Stockwell
Party	Candidate	Votes	%	±%
Labour	Sidney Gurney	3,494		
Labour	William Hall	3,485		
Labour	W. Johnson	3,401		
Conservative	S. Arnold	894		
Conservative	A. Shakespear	842		
Conservative	M. Tyler	824		
Turnout				
Labour gain from Conservative		Swing		
Labour gain from Conservative		Swing		
Labour gain from Conservative		Swing		

=== 1968 election ===
The election took place on 9 May 1968.

1968 Lambeth London Borough Council election: Stockwell
Party	Candidate	Votes	%	±%
Conservative	D. Gibbons	1,356		
Conservative	M. Tyler	1,336		
Conservative	D. Smith	1,329		
Labour	W. Johnson	1,146		
Labour	Sidney Gurney	1,126		
Labour	Ewan Carr	1,121		
Turnout				
Conservative gain from Labour		Swing		
Conservative gain from Labour		Swing		
Conservative gain from Labour		Swing		

=== 1964 election ===
The election took place on 7 May 1964.

1964 Lambeth London Borough Council election: Stockwell
Party	Candidate	Votes	%	±%
Labour	Ewan Carr	1,645	72.9	
Labour	F. Chesher	1,617		
Labour	Sidney Gurney	1,611		
Conservative	D. Gibbons	533	23.6	
Conservative	A. Black	518		
Conservative	M. Wallace	493		
Communist	T. Gorringe	78	3.5	
Turnout		2,197	19.5	
Registered electors		11,275		
Labour win (new seat)				
Labour win (new seat)				
Labour win (new seat)				
