= 1990 Lambeth London Borough Council election =

1990 local election in England

- May 3, 1990

All 64 seats up for election to Lambeth London Borough Council 33 seats needed for a majority
- Registered: 176,913|
- Turnout: 81,180, 45.89%

	First party	Second party	Third party
Leader	Joan K. Twelves	Unknown	Unknown
Party	Labour	Conservative	Liberal Democrats
Leader since	1989	Unknown	Unknown
Leader's seat	Larkhall	Unknown	Unknown
Seats before	40	21	3
Seats won	40	20	4 (Note: includes results from candidates that ran under the name 'Liberal Democratic Focus Team')
Seat change	Steady	▼1	▲1
Popular vote	105,258	77,854	24,758
Percentage	48.30%	35.72%	11.36%
Council Control before election
Labour
Council Control after election
Labour

Elections to Lambeth London Borough Council were held in May 1990. The whole council was up for election. Turnout was 42.3%.

== Election result ==
Lambeth local election result 1990
Party	Seats	Gains	Losses	Net gain/loss	Seats %	Votes %	Votes	+/−
Labour	40	2	2	Steady	62.50	48.30	105,258	
Conservative	20	2	3	▼1	31.25	35.72	77,854	
Liberal Democrats	4	2	1	▲1	6.25	11.36	24,758	
Green	0	0	0	Steady	0.00	4.14	9,020	
SDP	0	0	0	Steady	0.00	0.32	709	
Communist	0	0	0	Steady	0.00	0.11	232	
Independent	0	0	0	Steady	0.00	0.05	107	
Total	64						217,938	

== Ward results ==
(*) - Indicates an incumbent candidate

(†) - Indicates an incumbent candidate standing in different ward

=== Angell ===
Angell (3)
Party	Candidate	Votes	%
Labour	Stephen French*	1,857	66.67
Labour	Lesley Hammond*	1,752	
Labour	John Tuite	1,664	
Conservative	Stewart Cowell	490	18.01
Conservative	Tracy Fawthrop	488	
Conservative	Mark Pugh	446	
Green	David Lovatt	404	15.32
Registered electors		7,655	
Turnout		2,683	35.05
Rejected ballots		5	0.19
Labour hold			
Labour hold			
Labour hold			

=== Bishop's ===
Bishop's (3)
Party	Candidate	Votes	%
Labour	Catherine Ashley	1,764	56.13
Labour	Marilyn Evers^{†} (Note: Evers was a sitting councillor representing the Oval ward)	1,672	
Labour	Graham Nicholas*	1,671	
Conservative	Paul Giles	702	22.59
Conservative	Amanda Hodgkinson	680	
Conservative	William Kendall	674	
Liberal Democrats	William Calder-Hamilton	399	12.37
Liberal Democrats	Lindsay Avebury	386	
Liberal Democrats	Andrew Sawdon	341	
Green	Alan Daly	270	8.91
Registered electors		7,540	
Turnout		3,084	40.90
Rejected ballots		4	0.13
Labour hold			
Labour hold			
Labour hold			

=== Clapham Park ===
Clapham Park (3)
Party	Candidate	Votes	%
Conservative	Rodney Shakespeare*	1,888	43.48
Conservative	Rodney Parker*	1,837	
Conservative	Amrita Parker	1,791	
Labour	Colin Bryant	1,573	35.60
Labour	Christopher Cattermole	1,517	
Labour	Suhail Aziz	1,429	
Green	David Kemball-Cook	556	13.14
Liberal Democrats	Ann Watson	358	7.78
Liberal Democrats	Simon Wales	327	
Liberal Democrats	Andrew Loader	303	
Registered electors		8,808	
Turnout		4,208	47.77
Rejected ballots		9	0.21
Conservative hold			
Conservative hold			
Conservative hold			

=== Clapham Town ===
Clapham Town (3)
Party	Candidate	Votes	%
Labour	Patrick Callinan	1,853	45.31
Labour	Michael English	1,718	
Labour	Desmond Hall	1,708	
Conservative	Simon Baynes	1,445	36.46
Conservative	Caroline Chambers	1,438	
Conservative	Bernard Gentry	1,366	
Green	Clare Smith	420	10.81
Liberal Democrats	Marietta Crichton Stuart	312	7.42
Liberal Democrats	Andraea Dawson-Shepherd	279	
Liberal Democrats	Anthony McIsaac	274	
Registered electors		7,824	
Turnout		3,845	49.14
Rejected ballots		7	0.18
Labour hold			
Labour hold			
Labour hold			

=== Ferndale ===
Ferndale (3)
Party	Candidate	Votes	%
Labour	Denis Cooper-King	2,045	59.95
Labour	Julian Lewis*	2,025	
Labour	Abayomi Buraimoh-Igbo	1,996	
Conservative	Peter Griffiths	606	17.73
Conservative	Michael Dawson	595	
Conservative	Andrew Hayes	592	
Green	Jane Jenkins	410	12.16
Liberal Democrats	Geoffrey Bowring	358	10.17
Liberal Democrats	Henry Ward	351	
Liberal Democrats	John Medway	321	
Registered electors		8,480	
Turnout		3,270	38.56
Rejected ballots		5	0.15
Labour hold			
Labour hold			
Labour hold			

=== Gipsy Hill ===
Gipsy Hill (3)
Party	Candidate	Votes	%
Labour	George Huish*	2,014	42.48
Labour	Stewart Hunter*	2,014	
Labour	Rachael Webb^{†} (Note: Webb was a sitting councillor representing Ferndale ward)	1,849	
Conservative	Anthony Green	1,797	38.44
Conservative	James Collins	1,787	
Conservative	David Green	1,734	
Green	Iain McNaughton	452	9.80
Liberal Democrats	Malcolm Noble	448	9.28
Liberal Democrats	Gregory Drozdz	408	
Registered electors		8,899	
Turnout		4,540	51.02
Rejected ballots		8	0.18
Labour gain from Conservative			
Labour hold			
Labour hold			

=== Herne Hill ===
Herne Hill (3)
Party	Candidate	Votes	%
Labour	Amanda Waring	1,940	45.50
Labour	Stephen Whaley*	1,849	
Labour	James Dickson	1,822	
Conservative	Anthony Jones	1,332	32.07
Conservative	Simon Williams	1,319	
Conservative	Anthony Mathews	1,302	
Green	David Brett	571	13.89
Liberal Democrats	Philip Heath	351	8.54
Registered electors		7,914	
Turnout		3,822	48.29
Rejected ballots		4	0.10
Labour hold			
Labour hold			
Labour hold			

=== Knight's Hill ===
Knight's Hill (3)
Party	Candidate	Votes	%
Conservative	Simon Fawthrop*	1,944	41.20
Conservative	Peter Evans* (Note: Evans replaced Cllr Pugh after his resignation in 1988)	1,936	
Conservative	John Pinniger*	1,847	
Labour	Barry Gray	1,745	37.36
Labour	Margaret Nicol	1,728	
Labour	Harold Frawley	1,720	
Green	William Collins	565	12.20
Liberal Democrats	Roderick Murrey	462	9.24
Liberal Democrats	Andrew Thurburn	393	
Registered electors		9,111	
Turnout		4,497	49.36
Rejected ballots		5	0.11
Conservative hold			
Conservative hold			
Conservative hold			

=== Larkhall ===
Larkhall (3)
Party	Candidate	Votes	%
Labour	Elizabeth Tapsell	2,086	57.76
Labour	Gregory Tucker*	1,975	
Labour	Joan Twelves^{†} (Note: Twelves was a sitting council representing the Bishop's ward)	1,966	
Conservative	Hikmet Bayram	792	22.05
Conservative	Robert Chambers	785	
Conservative	John Swannick	723	
Green	Patrick Stern	411	11.82
Liberal Democrats	Frances Crichton Stuart	303	8.37
Liberal Democrats	Patrick Mitchell	288	
Liberal Democrats	Timothy Pitt-Payne	281	
Registered electors		9,028	
Turnout		3,567	39.51
Rejected ballots		10	0.28
Labour hold			
Labour hold			
Labour hold			

=== Oval ===
Oval (3)
Party	Candidate	Votes	%
Labour	Janet Crook*	1,790	47.18
Labour	Alison Higgs^{†} (Note: Higgs was a sitting councillor representing Larkhall ward)	1,718	
Labour	Joseph Singh	1,564	
Conservative	John Pattman	873	23.72
Conservative	Clifford Grantham	870	
Conservative	Renee Straker	807	
Green	Henry Bewley	420	11.72
SDP	David Chamberlain	358	9.90
SDP	Raymond Woolford	351	
Liberal Democrats	Susan Bussell	304	7.48
Liberal Democrats	Richard Hardman	270	
Liberal Democrats	Suresh Patel	231	
Registered electors		8,203	
Turnout		3,444	41.98
Rejected ballots		5	0.15
Labour hold			
Labour hold			
Labour hold			

=== Prince's ===
Prince's (3)
Party	Candidate	Votes	%
Lib Dem Focus Team	Michael Tuffrey	1,552	44.90
Lib Dem Focus Team	Keith Fitchett	1,434	
Lib Dem Focus Team	Sandra Lawman	1,413	
Labour	Alan Hennessey	1,125	32.56
Labour	David Jarvis	1,067	
Labour	Madge McGhie	997	
Conservative	Mary Becker	455	13.57
Conservative	Nicholas Edwards	453	
Conservative	Anne Taute	420	
Green	Jason Evers	186	5.70
Independent	John Howard	107	3.28
Registered electors		6,269	
Turnout		3,265	52.08
Rejected ballots		5	0.15
Lib Dem Focus Team hold			
Lib Dem Focus Team gain from Labour			
Lib Dem Focus Team hold			

=== St Leonard's ===
St Leonard's (3)
Party	Candidate	Votes	%
Conservative	David Griffiths	1,740	48.96
Conservative	Mary Leigh*	1,726	
Conservative	Hugh Jones*	1,670	
Labour	Robert Ballard	1,208	33.11
Labour	Barbara Cawdron	1,163	
Labour	Roger Marshall	1,103	
Green	Thomas Bewley	339	9.69
Liberal Democrats	Sheila Clarke	318	8.24
Liberal Democrats	Pearl Balachandran	277	
Liberal Democrats	Duncan Brack	269	
Registered electors		7,880	
Turnout		3,555	45.11
Rejected ballots		7	0.20
Conservative hold			
Conservative hold			
Conservative hold			

=== St Martin's ===
St Martin's (3)
Party	Candidate	Votes	%
Labour	John Harrison*	1,662	43.30
Labour	Dennis Houghting*	1,519	
Labour	Susan Smith	1,473	
Conservative	Michael Lawson	1,377	37.60
Conservative	Derek Laud	1,346	
Conservative	Charles Liddell-Grainger	1,317	
Liberal Democrats	David Stimpson	376	9.58
Green	Catherine Thorogood	341	9.52
Liberal Democrats	Colin Kolb	334	
Liberal Democrats	Rajnikant Patel	320	
Registered electors		8,046	
Turnout		3,648	45.34
Rejected ballots		7	0.20
Labour hold			
Labour hold			
Labour hold			

=== Stockwell ===
Stockwell (3)
Party	Candidate	Votes	%
Labour	Joshua Arnold-Forster	1,708	52.78
Labour	John McCay	1,664	
Labour	Ian Mallett	1,606	
Conservative	Ann Bozman	918	27.97
Conservative	Andrew Elliott	874	
Conservative	Henrietta Royle	846	
Green	Giles Collins	354	11.26
Liberal Democrats	Christopher Jeffrey	311	7.99
Liberal Democrats	Clive Pritchard	240	
Liberal Democrats	Peter Truesdale	202	
Registered electors		7,204	
Turnout		3,157	43.82
Rejected ballots		4	0.13
Labour hold			
Labour hold			
Labour hold			

=== Streatham Hill ===
Streatham Hill (3)
Party	Candidate	Votes	%
Conservative	Gloria Hutchens*	1,964	42.83
Conservative	Colin Mason	1,958	
Conservative	Kenneth Sharvill	1,868	
Labour	David Parkin	1,580	33.27
Labour	Greta Akepeneye	1,498	
Labour	Joshua Anim	1,420	
Liberal Democrats	Ewan Cameron	602	12.89
Liberal Democrats	Clive Gross	579	
Liberal Democrats	Martin Horwood	561	
Green	Penelope Shepherd	496	11.01
Registered electors		9,047	
Turnout		4,531	50.08
Rejected ballots		8	0.18
Conservative gain from Liberal Democrats			
Conservative hold			
Conservative hold			

=== Streatham South ===
Streatham South (3)
Party	Candidate	Votes	%
Conservative	Edward Castle	2,015	48.31
Conservative	Anthony Bays*	1,988	
Conservative	Simon Hooberman*	1,950	
Labour	Michael Fisher	1,506	35.62
Labour	David Salisbury Jones	1,451	
Labour	Trevor Hill	1,432	
Liberal Democrats	Michael Flindall	381	8.57
Liberal Democrats	Joyce Young	357	
Liberal Democrats	Andrew McClorry	318	
Green	Colin McInnes	308	7.50
Registered electors		8,190	
Rejected ballots		4,201	51.29
Turnout		9	0.21
Conservative hold			
Conservative hold			
Conservative hold			

=== Streatham Wells ===
Streatham Wells (3)
Party	Candidate	Votes	%
Conservative	Hugh Chambers*	1,587	32.05
Lib Dem Focus Team	Julian Heather	1,557	31.36
Conservative	Robert Greenwood*	1,547	
Lib Dem Focus Team	Robert Doyle	1,501	
Conservative	William Westover	1,466	
Lib Dem Focus Team	Maltby Pindar	1,441	
Labour	Robert Hill	1,417	28.50
Labour	Stephen Glazier	1,358	
Labour	Alexander McKenna	1,315	
Green	Belinda Walker	387	8.09
Registered electors		9,591	
Turnout		4,780	49.84
Rejected ballots		3	0.06
Conservative hold			
Lib Dem Focus Team gain from Conservative			
Conservative hold			

=== Thornton ===
Thornton (2)
Party	Candidate	Votes	%
Conservative	Ronald Bird*	1,385	43.62
Labour	Rudolp Daley*	1,360	42.40
Conservative	Roger Bennett	1,341	
Labour	David Davis	1,290	
Green	Susan Bradley	254	8.13
Liberal Democrats	Celia Thomas	194	5.86
Liberal Democrats	Arthur Capel	171	
Registered electors		5,746	
Turnout		3,179	55.33
Rejected ballots		5	0.16
Conservative hold			
Labour hold			

=== Thurlow Park ===
Thurlow Park (2)
Party	Candidate	Votes	%
Conservative	Clare Whelan	1,587	53.28
Conservative	John Whelan	1,548	
Labour	Lesley Day	863	27.62
Labour	John Leary	762	
Liberal Democrats	Jeremy Baker	340	10.43
Liberal Democrats	Brian Seymour	273	
Green	Katherine Frigerio	255	8.67
Registered electors		5,473	
Turnout		2,949	53.88
Rejected ballots		3	0.10
Conservative hold			
Conservative hold			

=== Town Hall ===
Town Hall (3)
Party	Candidate	Votes	%
Labour	Roger Roach	2,064	49.94
Labour	Geoffrey Wilkinson	1,967	
Labour	Dick Sorabji*	1,957	
Conservative	Egbert Christie	1,148	28.32
Conservative	Stephen Green	1,133	
Conservative	Peter Turvey	1,114	
Green	Roger Baker	606	15.16
Liberal Democrats	Elsie Binder	300	6.58
Liberal Democrats	Irene Yarwood	264	
Liberal Democrats	Henry Young	224	
Registered electors		8,993	
Turnout		4,064	45.19
Rejected ballots		10	0.25
Labour hold			
Labour hold			
Labour hold			

=== Tulse Hill ===
Tulse Hill (3)
Party	Candidate	Votes	%
Labour	Suzanne Roxby	1,986	53.29
Labour	Anne Hollifield	1,981	
Labour	Marion Schumann	1,883	
Conservative	Lesley Bone	596	15.30
Green	Susan Whall	593	16.21
Conservative	Christopher Ogg	558	
Conservative	Graham Pycock	526	
Liberal Democrats	Laura Morland	324	8.86
Communist	Teresa McNeil	232	6.34
Registered electors		7,801	
Turnout		3,315	42.49
Rejected ballots		6	0.18
Labour hold			
Labour hold			
Labour hold			

=== Vassall ===
Vassall (3)
Party	Candidate	Votes	%
Labour	Jacqueline Lake	2,072	57.13
Labour	Peter Mountford-Smith^{†} (Note: Mountford and Watson were sitting councillors representing the Clapham Town ward)	1,897	
Labour	Pauline Watson^{†}	1,880	
Conservative	John Blevins	872	24.88
Conservative	Judith Pattman	848	
Conservative	Peter Wilde	827	
Green	Tean Mitchell	422	12.36
Liberal Democrats	Monica Armitage-Smith	226	5.63
Liberal Democrats	Elizabeth Scarlett	179	
Liberal Democrats	Hilary Hunt	172	
Registered electors		9,211	
Turnout		3,576	38.82
Rejected ballots		2	0.06
Labour hold			
Labour hold			
Labour hold			
