= 1968 Lambeth London Borough Council election =

Elections to Lambeth London Borough Council were held in May 1968. The whole council was up for election. Turnout was 29.9%. Labour lost control of the Council which was under the control of the Conservatives until the next election.

== Electoral arrangements ==
The election was originally scheduled for 1967, but the term of members due to go out in 1967 was extended for one year to prevent the London borough council elections taking place in the same year as the Greater London Council election. (Note: Borough councillor and alderman terms due to end in 1967 were extended by the London Government Act 1967.) The election used the twenty wards from the previous election for a second time. Councillors were elected for three years with the next election scheduled for 1971.

Polling took place on 9 May 1968.

== Results ==
=== General election of councillors ===
Lambeth local election result 1968
Party	Seats	Gains	Losses	Net gain/loss	Seats %	Votes %	Votes	+/−
Conservative	62			+43	88.6	63.7		
Labour	8			-43	11.4	31.0		
Liberal	0	0	0	0	0.0	2.6		

=== Aldermanic election ===
This election had aldermen as well as councillors. Labour and the Conservatives both got 5 aldermen.

== Ward results ==
Candidates shown below are confirmed candidates.

=== Angell ===
Angell (3)
Party	Candidate	Votes	%	±%
Labour	C. Dryland	1,154		
Labour	G. Carey (Note: Incumbent candidate)	1,132		
Labour	S. Fitchett	1,065		
Conservative	R. Clinch	1,053		
Conservative	D. Hodgson	1,045		
Conservative	P. Whitelaw	989		
Communist	J. Skipp	180		
Turnout				
Labour hold		Swing		
Labour hold		Swing		
Labour hold		Swing		

=== Bishop's ===
Bishop's (3)
Party	Candidate	Votes	%	±%
Conservative				
Conservative				
Conservative				
Labour				
Labour				
Labour				
Turnout				
Conservative gain from Labour		Swing		
Conservative gain from Labour		Swing		
Conservative gain from Labour		Swing		

=== Clapham Park ===
Clapham Park (3)
Party	Candidate	Votes	%	±%
Conservative	George Hickmore	2,509		
Conservative	Enzio Righelato	2,486		
Conservative	Jack Ebling	2,437		
Labour	M. Kelly	1,051		
Labour	R. O'Carroll	1,006		
Labour	R. Ansell	1,004		
Liberal	T. Douglas	235		
Liberal	S. Beaven	231		
Liberal	M. Jouvenat	204		
Union Movement	W. Cheeseman	167		
Turnout				
Conservative hold		Swing		
Conservative hold		Swing		
Conservative hold		Swing		

=== Clapham Town ===
Clapham Town (3)
Party	Candidate	Votes	%	±%
Conservative				
Conservative				
Conservative				
Labour				
Labour				
Labour				
Turnout				
Conservative gain from Labour		Swing		
Conservative gain from Labour		Swing		
Conservative gain from Labour		Swing		

=== Ferndale ===
Ferndale (3)
Party	Candidate	Votes	%	±%
Conservative	J. Langley	1,025	18.0%	
Conservative	G. Allnut	1,002	17.6%	
Conservative	John Major	991	17.4%	
Labour	L. Davis	921	16.2%	
Labour	J. Dodson	892	15.7%	
Labour	D. Packer	863	15.2%	
Turnout		5,694		
Conservative gain from Labour		Swing		
Conservative gain from Labour		Swing		
Conservative gain from Labour		Swing		

=== Knight's Hill ===
Knight's Hill (3)
Party	Candidate	Votes	%	±%
Conservative	R. Pickard	2,724		
Conservative	W. Vinnell	2,676		
Conservative	F. Clark	2,650		
Labour	H. Lockwood	1,519		
Labour	G. Manning	1,443		
Labour	J. Wheeler	1,396		
Liberal	E. Hawthorne	450		
Liberal	A. Wagman	436		
Liberal	R. Rawcliffe	406		
Communist	C. Hoyle	128		
Turnout				
Conservative gain from Labour		Swing		
Conservative gain from Labour		Swing		
Conservative gain from Labour		Swing		

=== Larkhall ===
Larkhall (3)
Party	Candidate	Votes	%	±%
Conservative	D. Stephens	1,506		
Conservative	A. Young	1,500		
Conservative	G. Pisani	1,489		
Labour	D. Speakman	1,489		
Labour	W. King	1,177		
Labour	S. Parry	1,154		
Communist	S. Hope	198		
Turnout				
Conservative gain from Labour		Swing		
Conservative gain from Labour		Swing		
Conservative gain from Labour		Swing		

=== Leigham ===
Leigham (3)
Party	Candidate	Votes	%	±%
Conservative				
Conservative				
Conservative				
Labour				
Labour				
Labour				
Liberal				
Liberal				
Liberal				
Turnout				
Conservative hold		Swing		
Conservative hold		Swing		
Conservative hold		Swing		

=== Oval ===
Oval (3)
Party	Candidate	Votes	%	±%
Conservative	M. Becker	1,308	54.6	+32.0
Conservative	L. Burton	1,270		
Conservative	J. Smith	1,240		
Labour	J. Boyle	1,089	45.4	−32.0
Labour	W. Brownett	1,076		
Labour	F. Chesher	1,061		
Turnout		2,427	22.4	+4.5
Registered electors		10,835		−9.5
Conservative gain from Labour		Swing	+32.0	
Conservative gain from Labour		Swing	+32.0	
Conservative gain from Labour		Swing	+32.0	

=== Prince's ===
Prince's (3)
Party	Candidate	Votes	%	±%
Conservative				
Conservative				
Conservative				
Labour				
Labour				
Labour				
Communist				
Turnout				
Conservative gain from Labour		Swing		
Conservative gain from Labour		Swing		
Conservative gain from Labour		Swing		

=== St Leonard's ===
St Leonard's (3)
Party	Candidate	Votes	%	±%
Conservative	Jack Westbury	3,258		
Conservative	H. Jellie	3,254		
Conservative	M. Steere	3,226		
Labour	B. Hargreaves	619		
Labour	G. Gold	600		
Labour	R. Eadie	597		
Majority		2,607		
Turnout			34.6	
Conservative hold		Swing		
Conservative hold		Swing		
Conservative hold		Swing		

=== Stockwell ===
Stockwell (3)
Party	Candidate	Votes	%	±%
Conservative	D. Gibbons	1,356		
Conservative	M. Tyler	1,336		
Conservative	D. Smith	1,329		
Labour	W. Johnson	1,146		
Labour	Sidney Gurney	1,126		
Labour	Ewan Carr	1,121		
Turnout				
Conservative gain from Labour		Swing		
Conservative gain from Labour		Swing		
Conservative gain from Labour		Swing		

=== Streatham South ===
Streatham South (3)
Party	Candidate	Votes	%	±%
Conservative				
Conservative				
Conservative				
Labour				
Labour				
Labour				
Liberal				
Liberal				
Liberal				
Turnout				
Conservative hold		Swing		
Conservative hold		Swing		
Conservative hold		Swing		

=== Streatham Wells ===
Streatham Wells (3)
Party	Candidate	Votes	%	±%
Conservative				
Conservative				
Conservative				
Labour				
Labour				
Labour				
Liberal				
Liberal				
Liberal				
Independent				
Turnout				
Conservative hold		Swing		
Conservative hold		Swing		
Conservative hold		Swing		

=== Thornton ===
Thornton (3)
Party	Candidate	Votes	%	±%
Conservative	C. Brown	2,892		
Conservative	W. Fuller	2,874		
Conservative	G. Murray	1,214		
Labour	L. Drake	1,172		
Labour	M. Noble	1,159		
Labour	W. Seeley	1,159		
Communist	J. Styles	143		
Turnout				
Conservative gain from Labour		Swing		
Conservative gain from Labour		Swing		
Conservative gain from Labour		Swing		

=== Thurlow Park ===
Thurlow Park (3)
Party	Candidate	Votes	%	±%
Conservative				
Conservative				
Conservative				
Labour				
Labour				
Labour				
Liberal				
Liberal				
Liberal				
Turnout				
Conservative hold		Swing		
Conservative hold		Swing		
Conservative hold		Swing		

=== Town Hall ===
Town Hall (3)
Party	Candidate	Votes	%	±%
Conservative	J. McDonnell	2,136		
Conservative	I. Pepper	2,134		
Conservative	G. Barclay	2,124		
Labour	C. Draper	1,144		
Labour	B. Lawrence	1,137		
Labour	H. Rees	1,127		
Union Movement	D. Archer	180		
Turnout				
Conservative gain from Labour		Swing		
Conservative gain from Labour		Swing		
Conservative gain from Labour		Swing		

=== Tulse Hill ===
Tulse Hill (3)
Party	Candidate	Votes	%	±%
Conservative				
Conservative				
Conservative				
Labour				
Labour				
Labour				
Lambethan				
Lambethan				
Communist				
Turnout				
Conservative gain from Labour		Swing		
Conservative gain from Labour		Swing		
Conservative gain from Labour		Swing		

=== Vassall ===
Vassall (3)
Party	Candidate	Votes	%	±%
Conservative	J. Boyle	1,215		
Conservative	L. Roux	1,194		
Conservative	B. Manley	1,188		
Labour	I. England	1,092		
Labour	F. Rigger	1,035		
Labour	Frank Quenault	1,026		
Communist	J. Harman	236		
Turnout				
Conservative gain from Labour		Swing		
Conservative gain from Labour		Swing		
Conservative gain from Labour		Swing		
