= 1964 Lambeth London Borough Council election =

The 1964 Lambeth Council election took place on 7 May 1964 to elect members of Lambeth London Borough Council in London, England. The whole council was up for election and the Labour party gained control of the council. The election is notable for being the first one ever fought by John Major.

== Background ==
These elections were the first to the newly formed borough. Previously elections had taken place in the Metropolitan Borough of Lambeth and Metropolitan Borough of Wandsworth. These boroughs were joined to form the new London Borough of Lambeth by the London Government Act 1963.

According to the Act, Councillors and Aldermen are elected in each Borough. The number of Aldermen can be up to 1/6 of the total councillor seats, and they are elected from the pool of elected councillors or individuals eligible to be councillors. In the case of Lambeth, 60 councillor seats are contested across 20 three-member wards. Therefore, in addition to the 60 councillors, 10 Aldermen were elected, with nine representing Labour and one representing the Conservative party.

The council was elected in 1964 as a "shadow authority" but did not start operations until 1 April 1965.

== Election result ==
The results saw Labour gain the new council with a majority of 24 after winning 42 of the 60 seats. Overall turnout in the election was 26.1%. This turnout included 832 postal votes.

Lambeth local election result 1964
Party	Seats	Gains	Losses	Net gain/loss	Seats %	Votes %	Votes	+/−
Labour	51	-	-	-	72.8	51.8		
Conservative	19	-	-	-	27.1	41.9		
Liberal	0	-	-	-	0.0	1.3		

== Ward results ==
=== Angell ===
Angell (3)
Party	Candidate	Votes	%	±%
Labour	F. Kings	1,574	71.7	
Labour	V. Kings	1,547		
Labour	G. Carey	1,531		
Conservative	D. Brocklebank	414	18.9	
Conservative	D. Stephens	412		
Conservative	D. Bonass	397		
Liberal	R. Hay	115	5.2	
Liberal	C. Etherington	108		
Liberal	N. Terry	94		
Communist	A. Kay	92	4.2	
Turnout		2,170	19.0	
Registered electors		11,405		
Labour win (new seat)				
Labour win (new seat)				
Labour win (new seat)				

=== Bishop's ===
Bishop's (3)
Party	Candidate	Votes	%	±%
Labour	G. Light	1,393	74.6	
Labour	A. Dennis	1,391		
Labour	G. Jacques	1,391		
Conservative	D. Brocklebank	474	25.4	
Conservative	D. Stephens	472		
Conservative	D. Bonass	451		
Turnout		1,872	18.5	
Registered electors		10,141		
Labour win (new seat)				
Labour win (new seat)				
Labour win (new seat)				

=== Clapham Park ===
Clapham Park (3)
Party	Candidate	Votes	%	±%
Conservative	T. Rowlands	1,984	50.5	
Conservative	G. Hickmore	1,934		
Conservative	E. Righelato	1,885		
Labour	A. Wayman	1,679	42.7	
Labour	G. Hunt	1,666		
Labour	V. Bradley	1,659		
Liberal	P. Hurley	138	3.5	
Independent	T. Barnes	130	3.3	
Liberal	P. Evison	114		
Liberal	F. Monte	108		
Turnout		3,828	32.8	
Registered electors		11,687		
Conservative win (new seat)				
Conservative win (new seat)				
Conservative win (new seat)				

=== Clapham Town ===
Clapham Town (3)
Party	Candidate	Votes	%	±%
Labour	C. Blau	1,996	62.5	
Labour	J. Baker	1,990		
Labour	A. Moreton	1,979		
Conservative	A. Pfaff	1,073	33.6	
Conservative	A. Bradbury	1,071		
Conservative	W. Cole	1,064		
Liberal	S. Beaven	127	4.0	
Liberal	J. Chapman	109		
Liberal	S. Turrell	71		
Turnout		3,210	26.1	
Registered electors		12,321		
Labour win (new seat)				
Labour win (new seat)				
Labour win (new seat)				

=== Ferndale ===
Ferndale (3)
Party	Candidate	Votes	%	±%
Labour	D. Packer	1,219	66.2	
Labour	D. Colls	1,202		
Labour	W. Privett	1,195		
Conservative	D. Hodgson	532	28.9	
Conservative	M. Bartholomew	524		
Conservative	A. Baker	518		
Communist	R. Dearing	91	4.9	
Turnout		1,793	19.0	
Registered electors		9,432		
Labour win (new seat)				
Labour win (new seat)				
Labour win (new seat)				

=== Herne Hill ===
Herne Hill (3)
Party	Candidate	Votes	%	±%
Labour	H. De'Ath	1,493	44.2	
Labour	J. Cloves	1,492		
Labour	G. Culbard	1,462		
Conservative	S. Davey	1,441	42.6	
Conservative	C. Jones	1,418		
Conservative	T. Prestage	1,395		
Liberal	Dennis Chapman	447	13.2	
Liberal	K. Daniells	410		
Liberal	T. Barker	384		
Turnout		3,367	30.8	
Registered electors		10,946		
Labour win (new seat)				
Labour win (new seat)				
Labour win (new seat)				

=== Knight's Hill ===
Knight's Hill (3)
Party	Candidate	Votes	%	±%
Labour	H. Lockwood	2,070	56.1	
Labour	J. Fraser	2,055		
Labour	S. Fagan	2,036		
Conservative	B. High	1,621	43.9	
Conservative	P. Cory	1,617		
Conservative	W. Vinnell	1,603		
Turnout		3,729	31.1	
Registered electors		11,974		
Labour win (new seat)				
Labour win (new seat)				
Labour win (new seat)				

=== Larkhall ===
Larkhall (3)
Party	Candidate	Votes	%	±%
Labour	A. Crouch	1,901	66.5	
Labour	G. Gold	1,875		
Labour	W. King	1,861		
Conservative	J. Chambers	774	27.1	
Conservative	John Major	752		
Conservative	E. Brady	740		
Communist	S. Hope	107	3.7	
Independent	P. Winchester	77	2.7	
Turnout		2,755	24.5	
Registered electors		11,243		
Labour win (new seat)				
Labour win (new seat)				
Labour win (new seat)				

=== Leigham ===
Leigham (3)
Party	Candidate	Votes	%	±%
Conservative	K. Scott-Simpson	1,883	49.4	
Conservative	W.C. Dennis	1,874		
Conservative	B.J. Perkins	1,835		
Labour	G.D. Manning	1,456	38.2	
Labour	J. Williams	1,425		
Labour	G.F. May	1,422		
Liberal	D.J. Leedham	469	12.3	
Liberal	R.J. Rust	468		
Liberal	F.R. Mott	454		
Turnout		3,794	32.4	
Registered electors		11,719		
Conservative win (new seat)				
Conservative win (new seat)				
Conservative win (new seat)				

=== Oval ===
Oval (3)
Party	Candidate	Votes	%	±%
Labour	W. Brownett	1,645	77.4	
Labour	G. Brownless	1,641		
Labour	W. Burrett	1,640		
Conservative	E. Hart	479	22.6	
Conservative	T. Taylor	473		
Conservative	M. Straw	470		
Turnout		2,137	17.9	
Registered electors		11,966		
Labour win (new seat)				
Labour win (new seat)				
Labour win (new seat)				

=== Prince's ===
Prince's (3)
Party	Candidate	Votes	%	±%
Labour	W.W. Begley	1,292	67.6	
Labour	T. Cleasby	1,279		
Labour	G.G. Anderson	1,277		
Conservative	J.E. Burgess	619	32.4	
Conservative	G.E. Goddard	570		
Conservative	H. McLean	565		
Turnout		1,889	19.1	
Registered electors		9,906		
Labour win (new seat)				
Labour win (new seat)				
Labour win (new seat)				

=== St Leonard's ===
St Leonard's (3)
Party	Candidate	Votes	%	±%
Conservative	M.F. Steere	2,330	65.3	
Conservative	L. Knowles	2,319		
Conservative	J. Westbury	2,301		
Labour	J. Roberts	943	26.4	
Labour	W.J. O'Shaughnessy	922		
Labour	S. Gittins	912		
Liberal	D.P. Mann	297	8.3	
Liberal	W.J. Charles	270		
Liberal	E.M. Punchard	267		
Turnout		3,564	31.5	
Registered electors		11,315		
Conservative win (new seat)				
Conservative win (new seat)				
Conservative win (new seat)				

=== Stockwell ===
Stockwell (3)
Party	Candidate	Votes	%	±%
Labour	E.G. Carr	1,645	72.9	
Labour	F.J. Chesher	1,617		
Labour	S.H. Gurney	1,611		
Conservative	D.A. Gibbons	533	23.6	
Conservative	A.G. Black	518		
Conservative	M. Wallace	493		
Communist	T. Gorringe	78	3.5	
Turnout		2,197	19.5	
Registered electors		11,275		
Labour win (new seat)				
Labour win (new seat)				
Labour win (new seat)				

=== Streatham South ===
Streatham South (3)
Party	Candidate	Votes	%	±%
Conservative	P.C.H. Cary	2,323	57.0	
Conservative	C.de H. Parkinson	2,321		
Conservative	F.W. Weyer	2,296		
Labour	E.W. Tarver	1,162	28.5	
Labour	M.J. Verden	1,142		
Labour	J.Q. McMaster	1,133		
Liberal	K.J. Cherrill	592	14.5	
Liberal	M.E. Mattinson	590		
Liberal	D.J.G. Bassi	558		
Turnout		4,094	33.4	
Registered electors		12,253		
Conservative win (new seat)				
Conservative win (new seat)				
Conservative win (new seat)				

=== Streatham Wells ===
Streatham Wells (3)
Party	Candidate	Votes	%	±%
Conservative	H.D.E. Chambers	2,094	61.1	
Conservative	C.E. Brackstone	2,076		
Conservative	R.E.G. Greenwood	2,075		
Labour	N.G. Russell	917	26.8	
Labour	E.H. Horstead	906		
Labour	R. Verden	882		
Liberal	T.J. Robinson	359	10.5	
Liberal	C.W.E. Dudley	355		
Liberal	S.F. Bayles	322		
Independent	W.G. Boaks	56	1.6	
Turnout		3,377	31.3	
Registered electors		10,783		
Conservative win (new seat)				
Conservative win (new seat)				
Conservative win (new seat)				

=== Thornton ===
Thornton (3)
Party	Candidate	Votes	%	±%
Labour	L. Drake	2,135	49.6	
Labour	D.S. Speakman	2,124		
Labour	D.C. Stimpson	2,097		
Conservative	M.I. Tennant	1,870	43.5	
Conservative	J.St.J. Brown	1,854		
Conservative	J.R. Ebling	1,854		
Liberal	G.C. Gower	206	4.8	
Liberal	A.C. Monteath	200		
Liberal	J.M. Nicholson	200		
Communist	J.E. Styles	91	2.1	
Turnout		4,324	35.6	
Registered electors		12,159		
Labour win (new seat)				
Labour win (new seat)				
Labour win (new seat)				

=== Thurlow Park ===
Thurlow Park (3)
Party	Candidate	Votes	%	±%
Conservative	D.T. Campbell	1,871	55.5	
Conservative	D. Ayres	1,849		
Conservative	D.F. How	1,849		
Labour	I.D. Brown	1,498	44.5	
Labour	P.Y. Massie	1,455		
Labour	R.A. Part	1,451		
Turnout		3,358	28.4	
Registered electors		11,826		
Conservative win (new seat)				
Conservative win (new seat)				
Conservative win (new seat)				

=== Town Hall ===
Town Hall (3)
Party	Candidate	Votes	%	±%
Labour	P.W. Huggett	1,808	60.6	
Labour	B.M. Lawrence	1,795		
Labour	W. Seeley	1,795		
Conservative	J.E. Langley	984	33.0	
Conservative	J.W. Taylor	969		
Conservative	W.F. Fiander	954		
Liberal	K.L. Phelps	192	4.8	
Liberal	A.L. Banks	184		
Liberal	A.P. Hilton	180		
Turnout		2,997	24.8	
Registered electors		12,065		
Labour win (new seat)				
Labour win (new seat)				
Labour win (new seat)				

=== Tulse Hill ===
Tulse Hill (3)
Party	Candidate	Votes	%	±%
Labour	C.F. Hart	1,604	56.6	
Labour	L.E.G. Francis	1,603		
Labour	W.H. Adams	1,595		
Conservative	J.T. Metcalfe	1,163	41.1	
Conservative	J.M. Meyer	1,155		
Conservative	W.J. Strange	1,152		
Communist	A.F. Von Sertima	65	2.3	
Turnout		2,824	23.3	
Registered electors		12,123		
Labour win (new seat)				
Labour win (new seat)				
Labour win (new seat)				

=== Vassall ===
Vassall (3)
Party	Candidate	Votes	%	±%
Labour	I.C. England	1,729	69.9	
Labour	F.W. Quenault	1,715		
Labour	F.S.G. Rigger	1,697		
Conservative	B. Manley	746	30.1	
Conservative	W.A. Randle	734		
Conservative	N.G. Wallace	734		
Turnout		2,492	20.3	
Registered electors		12,287		
Labour win (new seat)				
Labour win (new seat)				
Labour win (new seat)				
