= 1982 Lambeth London Borough Council election =

1982 local election in England

Elections to Lambeth London Borough Council were held in May 1982. The whole council was up for election. Turnout was 40.1%.

== Election result ==
Lambeth local election result 1982
Party	Seats	Gains	Losses	Net gain/loss	Seats %	Votes %	Votes	+/−
Labour	32			-10	50.0	33.2		
Conservative	27			+5	42.2	39.0		
Alliance	5	5	0	+5	7.8	26.7		

== Ward results ==
=== Angell ===
Angell (3)
Party	Candidate	Votes	%	±%
Labour	Helen Crossfield	1,173		
Labour	Graham Norwood	1,126		
Labour	William Bowring	1,125		
Alliance	Edmund Gray	890		
Alliance	Paul Wilce	840		
Alliance	Mary Wilkinson	827		
Conservative	Anna Hunter	402		
Conservative	Eileen Thorne	370		
Conservative	Gillian Turner	367		
Turnout				
Labour hold		Swing		
Labour hold		Swing		
Labour hold		Swing		

=== Bishop's ===
Bishop's (3)
Party	Candidate	Votes	%	±%

=== Clapham Park ===
Clapham Park (3)
Party	Candidate	Votes	%	±%

=== Clapham Town ===
Clapham Town (3)
Party	Candidate	Votes	%	±%

=== Ferndale ===
Ferndale (3)
Party	Candidate	Votes	%	±%
Labour	Ted Knight	1,504		
Labour	Peter Lansley	1,391		
Labour	Josephine Sinclair	1,366		
Alliance	Gabriel Solomon	978		
Alliance	Nicholas Couldroey	961		
Alliance	David Warner	933		
Conservative	Margaret Chambers	528		
Conservative	Dilip Vadgama	488		
Conservative	Irene Bird	461		
Communist	Jean Styles	132		
Total votes				
Labour hold		Swing		
Labour hold		Swing		
Labour hold		Swing		

=== Gipsy Hill ===
Gipsy Hill (3)
Party	Candidate	Votes	%	±%

=== Herne Hill ===
Herne Hill (3)
Party	Candidate	Votes	%	±%
Conservative	Patricia Jenkyns	1,569		
Labour	Lloyd Leon	1,554		
Labour	Joan Walley	1,530		
Conservative	William Newton	1,528		
Labour	John Sharland	1,514		
Conservative	Gerald Hartup	1,513		
Alliance	Alexander Grey	868		
Alliance	Margaret Watkinson	862		
Alliance	John Moore	859		
Turnout				
Conservative hold		Swing		
Labour hold		Swing		
Labour hold		Swing		

=== Knight's Hill ===
Knight's Hill (3)
Party	Candidate	Votes	%	±%

=== Larkhal ===
Larkhall (3)
Party	Candidate	Votes	%	±%

=== Oval ===
Oval (3)
Party	Candidate	Votes	%	±%
Labour	Janet Boateng	1,126		
Labour	John Quinn	1,085		
Labour	Elsie Horstead	1,026		
Alliance	Charles Burch	970		
Alliance	Wilfred Juniper	950		
Alliance	David Stimpson	929		
Conservative	Joseph Egerton	849		
Conservative	Edward Bickham	849		
Conservative	Lavender Taylor	818		
Turnout				
Labour hold		Swing		
Labour hold		Swing		
Labour hold		Swing		

=== Prince's ===
Prince's (3)
Party	Candidate	Votes	%	±%

=== St Leonard's ===
St Leonard's (3)
Party	Candidate	Votes	%	±%
Conservative	Mary Leigh	2,066		
Conservative	Hugh Jones	2,014		
Conservative	Iain Picton	2,009		
SDP	Lee Hughes	804		
Liberal	Keren Lewin	797		
Liberal	Michael Watson	770		
Labour	Roger Bowdery	521		
Labour	Winston Taylor	517		
Labour	Sally Bowdery	513		
Providers Who Care	Alf Hollender	22		
Majority		1,205		
Turnout			44.6	
Conservative hold		Swing		
Conservative hold		Swing		
Conservative hold		Swing		

=== St Martin's ===
St Martin's (3)
Party	Candidate	Votes	%	±%

=== Stockwell ===
Stockwell (3)
Party	Candidate	Votes	%	±%

=== Streatham Hill ===
Streatham Hill (3)
Party	Candidate	Votes	%	±%

=== Streatham South ===
Streatham South (3)
Party	Candidate	Votes	%	±%

=== Streatham Wells ===
Streatham Wells (3)
Party	Candidate	Votes	%	±%

=== Thornton ===
Thornton (2)
Party	Candidate	Votes	%	±%

=== Thurlow Park ===
Thurlow Park (2)
Party	Candidate	Votes	%	±%

=== Town Hall ===
Town Hall (3)
Party	Candidate	Votes	%	±%

=== Tulse Hill ===
Tulse Hill (3)
Party	Candidate	Votes	%	±%

=== Vassall ===
Vassall (3)
Party	Candidate	Votes	%	±%
