= Anthony Bottrall =

British diplomat

Lambeth Council Executive for Education
- In office 2 May 2002 – 4 May 2006

Lambeth Borough Councillor for Stockwell
- In office 5 May 1994 – 4 May 2006
- Preceded by: I Mallett
- Succeeded by: Pav Akhtar

Personal details
- Born: 15 May 1938
- Died: 16 December 2014 (aged 76)
- Party: Liberal Democrat
- Spouse: Ingeborg Oesch
- Education: Magdalen College, Oxford

Anthony Bottrall (15 May 1938 – 16 December 2014) was a British diplomat, expert in developmental agriculture and a Liberal Democrat, Lambeth London Borough Council, Stockwell ward politician.

He stood against incumbent Labour MP Kate Hoey at the 2001 United Kingdom general election in the seat of Vauxhall, finishing second.

He was the son of the poet Ronald Bottrall.
