= Vassall (ward) =

Electoral ward in the London Borough of Lambeth, United Kingdom (1965-2022)

Coordinates: 51.475°N 0.109°W

- Former electoral ward for the Lambeth London Borough Council
- Vassal ward boundaries from 2002 to 2022
- Borough: Lambeth
- County: Greater London
- Population: 14,143 (2011)
- Electorate: 11,995 (2018)

Former electoral ward
- Created: 1965
- Abolished: 2022
- Member: 3
- Replaced by: Myatt's Fields and Stockwell East
- GSS code: E05000436

Vassall was an electoral ward in the London Borough of Lambeth, United Kingdom, from 1965 to 2022. The ward was named after Henry Vassall-Fox, 3rd Baron Holland who was responsible for the first building development in the area in the 1820s. It was first used for the 1964 elections and last used for the 2018 elections. The boundaries of the ward were adjusted in 1978 and 2002. It returned three members to Lambeth London Borough Council. The ward was replaced by Myatt's Fields and Stockwell East in 2022.

== 2002–2022 Lambeth council elections ==
There was a revision of ward boundaries in Lambeth in 2002.

=== 2018 election ===
The election took place on 3 May 2018.

2018 Lambeth London Borough Council election: Vassall
Party	Candidate	Votes	%	±%
Labour	Jacqui Dyer	2,296	62.1	▲12.1
Labour	Annie Gallop	2,165		
Labour	Paul Gadsby	2,120		
Green	Sarah Mynott	594	15.0	▲2.1
Green	Florence Pollock	505		
Liberal Democrats	Kate Noble	476	13.1	▲0.4
Liberal Democrats	Juliet Hodges	474		
Green	Bruno Combelles	471		
Liberal Democrats	John Lubbock	433		
Conservative	Glen Promnitz	338	8.6	▼4.6
Conservative	Gareth Wallace	318		
Conservative	Stuart Barr	257		
Pirate	Mark Chapman	127	1.2	▲0.1
Total votes				
Labour hold		Swing		
Labour hold		Swing		
Labour hold		Swing		

=== 2014 election ===
The election took place on 22 May 2014.

2014 Lambeth London Borough Council election: Vassall
Party	Candidate	Votes	%	±%
Labour	Jacqui Dyer	1,751	50.0	
Labour	Paul Gadsby	1,723		
Labour	Annie Gallop	1,671		
Green	Celia Cole	598	17.1	
Conservative	Paul Abbott	463	13.2	
Conservative	Stuart Barr	451		
Green	Owen Everett	451		
Liberal Democrats	Lindsay Avebury	445	12.7	
Green	John Walton	419		
Liberal Democrats	Collette Thomas	388		
Conservative	Joshua Gething	382		
Liberal Democrats	Dominic Wyard	254		
Pirate	Mark Chapman	129	3.7	
TUSC	Dalton Montague	113	3.2	
Total votes				
Labour hold		Swing		
Labour gain from Liberal Democrats		Swing		
Labour hold		Swing		

=== 2010 election ===
The election on 6 May 2010 took place on the same day as the United Kingdom general election.

2010 Lambeth London Borough Council election: Vassall
Party	Candidate	Votes	%	±%
Labour	Kingsley Abrams	2,533		
Labour	Adrian Garden	2,308		
Liberal Democrats	Steve Bradley	2,193		
Labour	Tracy Ritson	2,146		
Liberal Democrats	Faye Gray	1,793		
Liberal Democrats	Matthew Hanney	1,617		
Conservative	Stuart Barr	706		
Conservative	Andrew Hayes	593		
Green	Alexandra Olive	542		
Conservative	Carolena Ludwig	525		
Green	Stephen Hall	477		
Green	Peter Cutler	476		
Total votes		15,909		
Labour hold		Swing		
Labour hold		Swing		
Liberal Democrats hold		Swing		

=== 2006 election ===
The election took place on 4 May 2006.

2006 Lambeth London Borough Council election: Vassall
Party	Candidate	Votes	%	±%
Labour	Kingsley Abrams	1,426	44.2	
Labour	Liz Atkinson	1,421		
Labour	Alex McKenna	1,305		
Liberal Democrats	Adeline Aina	1,146	35.5	
Liberal Democrats	Steve Bradley	1,092		
Liberal Democrats	Ernest Baidoo-Mitchell	1,044		
Conservative	Stuart Barr	369	11.4	
Conservative	Deborah Thomas	360		
Conservative	Judith Collier	341		
Respect	Stephen Hack	287	8.9	
Respect	Abdul Chowdhury	257		
Respect	Aboubakar Sako	234		
Total votes		9,282		
Labour hold		Swing		
Labour hold		Swing		
Labour hold		Swing		

=== 2002 election ===
The election took place on 2 May 2002.

2002 Lambeth London Borough Council election: Vassall
Party	Candidate	Votes	%	±%
Labour	Liz Atkinson	1,056	16.9	
Labour	Alex McKenna	943	15.1	
Labour	Daniel Sabbagh	895	14.3	
Liberal Democrats	Tom Cornwall	851	13.6	
Liberal Democrats	Antonia Ewetuga	846	13.5	
Liberal Democrats	Rene Kinzett	744	11.9	
Green	Keith Sperry	257	4.1	
Conservative	Nicholas Gibbon	188	3.0	
Conservative	Antony Shakespeare	181	2.9	
Conservative	Laurence King	165	2.6	
Socialist Alliance	Brenda Downes	127	2.0	
Turnout		6,253	23.3	
Labour win (new boundaries)				
Labour win (new boundaries)				
Labour win (new boundaries)				

== 1978–2002 Lambeth council elections ==
Vassal ward boundaries from 1978 to 2002

There was a revision of ward boundaries in Lambeth in 1978.

== 1964–1978 Lambeth council elections ==
External image
- Map showing Vassal ward boundaries from 1965 to 1978

=== 1974 election ===
The election took place on 2 May 1974.

1974 Lambeth London Borough Council election: Vassall
Party	Candidate	Votes	%	±%
Labour	Frank Quenault	1,050		
Labour	J. Quinn	1,037		
Labour	A. Thompson	998		
Conservative	S. De Laszlo	550		
Conservative	A. Swing	546		
Conservative	D. De Laszlo	543		
Communist	R. Mace	138		
Turnout				
Labour hold		Swing		
Labour hold		Swing		
Labour hold		Swing		

=== 1971 election ===
The election took place on 13 May 1971.

1971 Lambeth London Borough Council election: Vassall
Party	Candidate	Votes	%	±%
Labour	I. England	2,055	24.8%	
Labour	N. Mudie	1,989	24.0%	
Labour	Frank Quenault	1,959	23.6%	
Conservative	B. Manley	791	9.5%	
Conservative	R. Silver	751	9.1%	
Conservative	J. Boyle	747	9.0%	
Turnout		8,292		
Labour gain from Conservative		Swing		
Labour gain from Conservative		Swing		
Labour gain from Conservative		Swing		

=== 1968 election ===
The election took place on 9 May 1968.

1968 Lambeth London Borough Council election: Vassall
Party	Candidate	Votes	%	±%
Conservative	J. Boyle	1,215		
Conservative	L. Roux	1,194		
Conservative	B. Manley	1,188		
Labour	I. England	1,092		
Labour	F. Rigger	1,035		
Labour	Frank Quenault	1,026		
Communist	J. Harman	236		
Turnout				
Conservative gain from Labour		Swing		
Conservative gain from Labour		Swing		
Conservative gain from Labour		Swing		

=== 1964 election ===
The election took place on 7 May 1964.

1964 Lambeth London Borough Council election: Vassall
Party	Candidate	Votes	%	±%
Labour	I. England	1,729	69.9	
Labour	Frank Quenault	1,715		
Labour	F. Rigger	1,697		
Conservative	B. Manley	746	30.1	
Conservative	W. Randle	734		
Conservative	N. Wallace	734		
Turnout		2,492	20.3	
Registered electors		12,287		
Labour win (new seat)				
Labour win (new seat)				
Labour win (new seat)				
