= 1974 Lambeth London Borough Council election =

Elections to Lambeth London Borough Council were held in May 1974. The whole council was up for election. Turnout was 28.3%. This election was the last one that had aldermen as well as councillors. Labour got all 10 aldermen.

== Election result ==
Lambeth local election result 1974
Party	Seats	Gains	Losses	Net gain/loss	Seats %	Votes %	Votes	+/−
Labour	56				80.0	51.3		
Conservative	14				20.0	37.8		
Liberal	0				0.0	8.2		

== Ward results ==
Angell (3)
Party	Candidate	Votes	%	±%

Bishop's (3)
Party	Candidate	Votes	%	±%

Clapham Park (3)
Party	Candidate	Votes	%	±%

Clapham Town (3)
Party	Candidate	Votes	%	±%

Ferndale (3)
Party	Candidate	Votes	%	±%

Herne Hill (3)
Party	Candidate	Votes	%	±%

Knight's Hill (3)
Party	Candidate	Votes	%	±%

Larkhall (3)
Party	Candidate	Votes	%	±%

Leigham (3)
Party	Candidate	Votes	%	±%

Oval (3)
Party	Candidate	Votes	%	±%

Prince's (3)
Party	Candidate	Votes	%	±%

St Leonard's (3)
Party	Candidate	Votes	%	±%

Stockwell (3)
Party	Candidate	Votes	%	±%

Streatham South (3)
Party	Candidate	Votes	%	±%

Streatham Wells (3)
Party	Candidate	Votes	%	±%

Thornton (3)
Party	Candidate	Votes	%	±%

Thurlow Park (3)
Party	Candidate	Votes	%	±%

Town Hall (3)
Party	Candidate	Votes	%	±%

Tulse Hill (3)
Party	Candidate	Votes	%	±%

Vassall (3)
Party	Candidate	Votes	%	±%
