= 1971 Lambeth London Borough Council election =

Elections to Lambeth London Borough Council were held in May 1971. The whole council was up for election. Turnout was 35.4%. This election had aldermen as well as councillors. Labour and the Conservatives both got 5 aldermen.

== Election result ==
Lambeth local election result 1971
Party	Seats	Gains	Losses	Net gain/loss	Seats %	Votes %	Votes	+/−
Labour	56	48	0	+48	80.0	59.1	133,553	
Conservative	14	0	48	-48	20.0	38.8	87,731	
Liberal	0	0	0	0	0.0	1.3	2,976	
Independent	0	0	0	0	0.0	0.3	745	
Communist	0	0	0	0	0.0	0.3	600	
National Front	0	0	0	0	0.0	0.1	303	

== Ward results ==
=== Angell ===
Angell (3)
Party	Candidate	Votes	%
Labour	C. Dryland	1,154	17.4%
Labour	G. F. Carey	1,132	17.1%
Labour	S. J. Fitchett	1,065	16.1%
Conservative	R. S. Clinch	1,053	15.9%
Conservative	Mrs J. M. Hodgson	1,045	15.8%
Conservative	P. V. J. Whitelaw	989	14.9%
Communist	Mrs J. M. Skipp	180	2.7%
Turnout		6,618	
Labour hold			
Labour hold			
Labour hold			

=== Bishop's ===
Bishop's (3)
Party	Candidate	Votes	%
Labour	P. W. Lane	2,574	27.2%
Labour	R. P. Gregory	2,556	27.0%
Labour	Mrs R. Verden	2,440	25.8%
Conservative	Miss A. Gains	718	7.6%
Conservative	R. S. Ratman	628	6.6%
Conservative	M. A. V. Brocklebank	558	5.9%
Turnout		9,474	
Labour gain from Conservative			
Labour gain from Conservative			
Labour gain from Conservative			

=== Clapham Park ===
Clapham Park (3)
Party	Candidate	Votes	%
Labour	C. C. Clegg	2,267	17.6%
Labour	G. H. Smith	2,207	17.1%
Labour	P. E Biddlecombe	2,158	16.7%
Conservative	Mrs A. M. Blair	2,071	16.0%
Conservative	E. Righelato	2,007	15.5%
Conservative	Miss M. Yuill	1,970	15.3%
Independent	Mrs M. A. Kelly	235	1.8%
Turnout		12,915	
Labour gain from Conservative			
Labour gain from Conservative			
Labour gain from Conservative			

=== Clapham Town ===
Clapham Town (3)
Party	Candidate	Votes	%
Labour	I. G. Bing	2,916	21.8%
Labour	L. Drake	2,906	21.7%
Labour	A. C. Muller	2,868	21.4%
Conservative	Mrs M. Mackiewicz	1,588	11.9%
Conservative	George Young	1,576	11.8%
Conservative	A. Pfaff	1,544	11.5%
Turnout		13,398	
Labour gain from Conservative			
Labour gain from Conservative			
Labour gain from Conservative			

=== Ferndale ===
Ferndale (3)
Party	Candidate	Votes	%
Labour	L. G. M. Davis	1,574	25.6%
Labour	D. J. Packer	1,498	24.4%
Labour	M. Kempadoo	1,468	23.9%
Conservative	G. R. J. Allnutt	498	8.1%
Conservative	J. S. Tosh	497	8.1%
Conservative	R. Wheelhouse	480	7.8%
Communist	Mrs J. Harman	122	2.0%
Turnout		6,137	
Labour gain from Conservative			
Labour gain from Conservative			
Labour gain from Conservative			

=== Herne Hill ===
Herne Hill (3)
Party	Candidate	Votes	%
Labour	L. D. Hammond	2,111	18.8%
Labour	P. A. Butler	2,069	18.5%
Labour	T. N. Flynn	2,058	18.4%
Conservative	C. W. Jones	1,662	14.8%
Conservative	L. D. Kennedy	1,657	14.8%
Conservative	F. W. Salter	1,648	14.7%
Turnout		11,205	
Labour gain from Conservative			
Labour gain from Conservative			
Labour gain from Conservative			

=== Knight's Hill ===
Knight's Hill (3)
Party	Candidate	Votes	%
Labour	Ken Livingstone	2,905	19.2%
Labour	G. D. Manning	2,881	19.1%
Labour	D. D. Prentice	2,813	18.6%
Conservative	J. Johnstone	1,967	13.0%
Conservative	Mrs L. M. Burton	1,937	12.8%
Conservative	W. G. C. Vinnell	1,922	12.7%
Liberal	M. F. Drake	236	1.6%
Liberal	Mrs A. P. Wagman	226	1.5%
Liberal	T. J. Barker	220	1.5%
Turnout		15,107	
Labour gain from Conservative			
Labour gain from Conservative			
Labour gain from Conservative			

=== Larkhall ===
Larkhall (3)
Party	Candidate	Votes	%
Labour	C. J. Blau	2,549	24.9%
Labour	Mrs M. V. Kidd	2,481	24.2%
Labour	Miss E. H. Horstead	2,450	23.9%
Conservative	R. A. Hickman	836	8.2%
Conservative	D. A. Powell	815	8.0%
Conservative	D. M. D. Stephens	800	7.8%
Communist	S. G. Hope	101	1.0%
Liberal	W. A. J. Bennett	79	0.8%
Liberal	D. B. Sandford	73	0.7%
Liberal	W. Woodward	67	0.7%
Turnout		10,251	
Labour gain from Conservative			
Labour gain from Conservative			
Labour gain from Conservative			

=== Leigham ===
Leigham (3)
Party	Candidate	Votes	%
Labour	Miss M. V. Bedford	2,533	16.9%
Labour	B. C. Porter	2,503	16.7%
Labour	S. L. H. Shah	2,388	15.9%
Conservative	K. Scott-Simpson	2,377	15.8%
Conservative	B. J. Perkins	2,376	15.8%
Conservative	B. A. Udell	2,355	15.7%
Liberal	G. A. Chattoe	178	1.2%
Liberal	D. P. Mann	160	1.1%
Liberal	Mrs M. L. Baker-Caton	154	1.0%
Turnout		15,024	
Labour gain from Conservative			
Labour gain from Conservative			
Labour gain from Conservative			

=== Oval ===
Oval (3)
Party	Candidate	Votes	%
Labour	E. G. Carr	2,409	25.1%
Labour	W. J. Juniper	2,405	25.1%
Labour	T. Sparrow	2,381	24.8%
Conservative	J. R. Inglis	825	8.6%
Conservative	Mrs J. Smith	799	8.3%
Conservative	F. J. Vallis	764	8.0%
Turnout		9,583	
Labour gain from Conservative			
Labour gain from Conservative			
Labour gain from Conservative			

=== Prince's ===
Prince's (3)
Party	Candidate	Votes	%
Labour	J. R. Medway	2,279	22.8%
Labour	Mrs P. J. Moberly	2,210	22.1%
Labour	D. S. Speakman	2,198	22.0%
Conservative	B. E. J. Shiner	961	9.6%
Conservative	Mrs J. Brittain	919	9.2%
Conservative	Miss B. L. Wallis	882	8.8%
Independent	S. N. D. Brown	412	4.1%
Communist	J. A. Henry	117	1.2%
Turnout		9,978	
Labour gain from Conservative			
Labour gain from Conservative			
Labour gain from Conservative			

=== St Leonard's ===
St Leonard's (3)
Party	Candidate	Votes	%
Conservative	Miss H. Jellie	2,563	22.4%
Conservative	R. Turtill	2,517	22.0%
Conservative	V. Bogazzi	2,515	22.0%
Labour	M. Justice	1,316	11.5%
Labour	D. F. Easto	1,298	11.4%
Labour	N. D. Patel	1,215	10.6%
Turnout		11,424	
Conservative hold			
Conservative hold			
Conservative hold			

=== Stockwell ===
Stockwell (3)
Party	Candidate	Votes	%
Labour	S. H. Gurney	3,494	27.0%
Labour	W. A. Hall	3,485	26.9%
Labour	W. A. Johnson	3,401	26.3%
Conservative	Mrs S. L. Arnold	894	6.9%
Conservative	A. A. Shakespear	842	6.5%
Conservative	Miss M. G. Tyler	824	6.4%
Turnout		12,940	
Labour gain from Conservative			
Labour gain from Conservative			
Labour gain from Conservative			

=== Streatham South ===
Streatham South (3)
Party	Candidate	Votes	%
Conservative	P. C. H. Cary	2,105	17.6%
Conservative	I. L. Aarons	2,082	17.4%
Conservative	H. V. Chamarette	2,064	17.3%
Labour	D. E. Beeke	1,574	13.2%
Labour	E. W. Tarver	1,557	13.0%
Labour	Mrs M. T. I. Martin	1,554	13.0%
Liberal	D. E. Delaney	356	3.0%
Liberal	Mrs E. M. Kininmonth	334	1.9%
Liberal	Mrs G. F. Wright	328	1.8%
Turnout		11,954	
Conservative hold			
Conservative hold			
Conservative hold			

=== Streatham Wells ===
Streatham Wells (3)
Party	Candidate	Votes	%
Conservative	H. D. B. Chambers	2,205	19.7%
Conservative	R. E. G. Greenwood	2,176	19.4%
Conservative	S. A. Davey	2,167	19.4%
Labour	G. F. Culbard	1,551	13.9%
Labour	V. S. Mathews	1,551	13.9%
Labour	D. J. Dahl	1,541	13.8%
Turnout		11,191	
Conservative hold			
Conservative hold			
Conservative hold			

=== Thornton ===
Thornton (3)
Party	Candidate	Votes	%
Labour	D. W. Wendon	2,205	15.3%
Labour	W. P. Weston	2,176	15.1%
Labour	H. A. Bavin	2,167	15.1%
Conservative	A. E. S. Meyer	2,065	14.4%
Conservative	John Major	2,061	14.3%
Conservative	J. S. Steele	2,055	14.3%
Liberal	J. P. Taylor	205	1.4%
Liberal	A. G. Blackmore	182	1.3%
Liberal	Mrs M. A. Granger	178	1.2%
Communist	Mrs J. E. Styles	80	0.6%
Turnout		14,376	
Labour gain from Conservative			
Labour gain from Conservative			
Labour gain from Conservative			

=== Thurlow Park ===
Thurlow Park (3)
Party	Candidate	Votes	%
Labour	Mrs I. D. Brown	3,213	19.9%
Labour	M. B. Hopkins	3,163	19.6%
Labour	M. D. Petrou	3,111	19.3%
Conservative	J. F. E. Cartwright	2,136	13.2%
Conservative	D. J. Cutmore	2,107	13.1%
Conservative	D. F. How	2,103	13.0%
National Front	C. G. G. Knight	117	0.7%
National Front	P. McMenemie	94	0.6%
National Front	P. J. L. Addis	92	0.6%
Turnout		16,136	
Labour gain from Conservative			
Labour gain from Conservative			
Labour gain from Conservative			

=== Town Hall ===
Town Hall (3)
Party	Candidate	Votes	%
Labour	M. M. Noble	2,224	20.8%
Labour	F. S. G. Rigger	2,218	20.8%
Labour	W. Seeley	2,188	20.5%
Conservative	M. J. Lingwood	1,345	12.6%
Conservative	Mrs M. Becker	1,308	12.2%
Conservative	D. G. Llewellyn	1,305	12.2%
Independent	Bill Boaks	98	0.9%
Turnout		10,686	
Labour gain from Conservative			
Labour gain from Conservative			
Labour gain from Conservative			

=== Tulse Hill ===
Tulse Hill (3)
Party	Candidate	Votes	%
Labour	D. A. N. Jones	2,355	22.7%
Labour	Mrs F. Walker	2,298	22.1%
Labour	K. L. Enwright	2,289	22.0%
Conservative	A. S. Beadle	1,109	10.7%
Conservative	A. C. Ballantine	1,090	10.5%
Conservative	N. F. Epps	1,080	10.4%
Communist	F. J. Williams	173	1.7%
Turnout		10,394	
Labour gain from Conservative			
Labour gain from Conservative			
Labour gain from Conservative			

=== Vassall ===
Vassall (3)
Party	Candidate	Votes	%
Labour	Mrs I. C. England	2,055	24.8%
Labour	N. W. Mudie	1,989	24.0%
Labour	F. W. Quenault	1,959	23.6%
Conservative	Miss B. Manley	791	9.5%
Conservative	R. G. Silver	751	9.1%
Conservative	Mrs J. M. Boyle	747	9.0%
Turnout		8,292	
Labour gain from Conservative			
Labour gain from Conservative			
Labour gain from Conservative			
