= Clapham Town =

Electoral division in the London Borough of Lambeth

Coordinates: 51.466°N 0.143°W

- Electoral ward for the Lambeth London Borough Council
- Clapham Town ward boundaries since 2022
- Borough: Lambeth
- County: Greater London
- Population: 15,522 (2021) (Note: 2021 Census data reported for 2022 ward boundaries)

Current electoral ward
- Created: 1965
- Member: 3

Clapham Town is an electoral division of the London Borough of Lambeth, England.

The ward contains much of Clapham including part of Clapham Common and Clapham Common Underground station. At the 2011 census the population was 13,795.

The ward was located in the Vauxhall parliamentary constituency until July 2024, when it became a part of Vauxhall and Camberwell Green.

== Lambeth Council elections since 2022 ==
There was a revision of ward boundaries in Lambeth in 2022.

=== 2022 election ===
The election took place on 5 May 2022.

2022 Lambeth London Borough Council election: Clapham Town (3)
Party	Candidate	Votes	%	±%
Labour	Linda Bray *	1,779	51.5	
Labour	David Robson	1,603	46.4	
Labour	Tim Windle *	1,441	41.7	
Conservative	Tim Bennett	1,029	29.8	
Conservative	Lee Roberts	980	28.4	
Conservative	Marcia Irma De Costa	960	27.8	
Green	Marion Prideaux	729	21.1	
Green	John James	540	15.6	
Liberal Democrats	Julie Fox	485	14.0	
Green	Kerstin Selander	474	13.7	
Liberal Democrats	Rodney Ovenden	341	9.9	
Turnout		3,562	30.7	
Labour win (new boundaries)				
Labour win (new boundaries)				
Labour win (new boundaries)				

== 2002–2022 Lambeth council elections ==
Clapham Town ward boundaries from 2002 to 2022

There was a revision of ward boundaries in Lambeth in 2002.

=== 2018 election ===
The election took place on 3 May 2018.

2018 Lambeth London Borough Council election: Clapham Town (3)
Party	Candidate	Votes	%	±%
Labour	Linda Bray *	1,901		
Labour	Nigel Haselden *	1,840		
Labour	Christopher Wellbelove *	1,813		
Conservative	Tim Bennett	978		
Conservative	John Sunderland	968		
Conservative	Charley Jarrett	871		
Green	Kat Beach	474		
Liberal Democrats	Julie Fox	398		
Liberal Democrats	Marietta Stuart	389		
Green	Marion Prideaux	395		
Liberal Democrats	Rodney Ovenden	276		
Green	Shahzada Saeed	266		
Labour hold		Swing		
Labour hold		Swing		
Labour hold		Swing		

=== 2014 election ===
The election took place on 22 May 2014.

2014 Lambeth London Borough Council election: Clapham Town (3)
Party	Candidate	Votes	%	±%
Labour	Linda Bray	1,930		
Labour	Christopher Wellbelove *	1,853		
Labour	Nigel Haselden *	1,842		
Conservative	Hannah Ginnett	973		
Conservative	Seb Lowe	944		
Conservative	Gareth Wallace	848		
Green	Marion Prideaux	427		
Green	Julian Hall	423		
Green	Gerard Keenan	355		
Liberal Democrats	Baroness Rosalind Grender	253		
UKIP	Cameron Murdoch	191		
Liberal Democrats	Colin Penning	142		
Liberal Democrats	Jack Williams	122		
Socialist (GB)	Oliver Bond	46		
Total votes				
Labour hold		Swing		
Labour hold		Swing		
Labour hold		Swing		

=== 2010 election ===
The election on 6 May 2010 took place on the same day as the United Kingdom general election.

2010 Lambeth London Borough Council election: Clapham Town (3)
Party	Candidate	Votes	%	±%
Labour	Helen O'Malley *	2,670		
Labour	Nigel Haselden *	2,654		
Labour	Christopher Wellbelove *	2,405		
Conservative	Bernard Gentry	2,028		
Conservative	Matthew Jupp	1,972		
Conservative	Nicholas Maund	1,803		
Liberal Democrats	Vivienne Baines	1,092		
Liberal Democrats	Charlotte Parry	1,052		
Liberal Democrats	Malcolm Baines	974		
Green	Marion Prideaux	497		
Green	Roger Baker	406		
Green	Darren Raven	225		
Total votes		17,778		
Labour hold		Swing		
Labour hold		Swing		
Labour hold		Swing		

=== 2006 election ===
The election took place on 4 May 2006.

2006 Lambeth London Borough Council election: Clapham Town (3)
Party	Candidate	Votes	%	±%
Labour	Helen O'Malley *	1,535		
Labour	Nigel Haselden	1,417		
Labour	Christopher Wellbelove	1,293		
Conservative	Bernard Gentry	1,230		
Conservative	Glyn Chambers	1,121		
Conservative	Kelly Ben-Maimon	1,121		
Green	Albere Hanna	534		
Liberal Democrats	Gloria Gomez	484		
Liberal Democrats	Roger Stewart	379		
Liberal Democrats	Thomas Snagge	308		
Socialist (GB)	Daniel Lambert	62		
Socialist (GB)	James Martin	39		
Socialist (GB)	John Lee	38		
Total votes		9,561		
Labour hold		Swing		
Labour hold		Swing		
Labour gain from Conservative		Swing		

=== 2002 election ===
The election took place on 2 May 2002.

2002 Lambeth London Borough Council election: Clapham Town (3)
Party	Candidate	Votes	%	±%
Labour	Helen O'Malley	1,179		
Labour	Jonathan Myerson	1,160		
Conservative	Bernard Gentry	1,074		
Conservative	Andrew Hollingsworth	983		
Labour	Koysor Syed	968		
Conservative	Edward Heckels	958		
Liberal Democrats	Helen Belcher	397		
Green	Albere Hanna	382		
Liberal Democrats	Robert Banks	332		
Liberal Democrats	Robert Blackie	259		
Independent	James Martin	13		
Turnout				
Labour hold		Swing		
Labour hold		Swing		
Conservative gain from Labour		Swing		

== 1978–2002 Lambeth council elections ==
There was a revision of ward boundaries in Lambeth in 1978.
