= Angell (Lambeth ward) =

- Former electoral ward for the Lambeth London Borough Council
- Angell ward boundaries from 1978 to 2002
- Borough: Lambeth
- County: Greater London
- Electorate: 7,553 (1998)
- Major settlements: Angell Town and Loughborough Junction

Former electoral ward
- Created: 1965
- Abolished: 2002
- Member: 3
- Replaced by: Coldharbour and Herne Hill
- ONS code: 01AHFA

Angell was an electoral ward in the London Borough of Lambeth from 1965 to 2002. The ward was first used in the 1964 elections and last used for the 1998 elections. It returned three councillors to Lambeth London Borough Council. It was replaced by Coldharbour and Herne Hill wards.

== 1978–2002 Lambeth council elections ==
There was a revision of ward boundaries in Lambeth in 1978.

=== 1998 election ===
The election took place on 7 May 1998.

1998 Lambeth London Borough Council election: Angell
Party	Candidate	Votes	%	±%
Labour	Ambrose Hogan	946		
Labour	Donatus Anyanwu	906		
Labour	Simon Stevens	887		
Independent	Thomas Butler	315		
Independent	David Woolford	301		
Independent	Andrew Morris	274		
Liberal Democrats	Alan Beven	229		
Green	Albere Hanna	197		
Liberal Democrats	Manjula Roy	194		
Liberal Democrats	Richard Laming	178		
Conservative	Michael Angel	134		
Conservative	Sheila Angel	134		
Conservative	Robert Angel	104		
Movement for Justice	Alexander Owolade	95		
Communist League	Peter Clifford	59		
Turnout				
Labour hold		Swing		
Labour hold		Swing		
Labour hold		Swing		

=== 1994 election ===
The election took place on 5 May 1994.

1994 Lambeth London Borough Council election: Angell
Party	Candidate	Votes	%	±%
Labour	Catherine Ashley	1,188		
Labour	Charles Fairbank	1,079		
Labour	Stephen Cooley	1,075		
Independent	Ray Woolford	673		
Independent	Angela Butler	528		
Liberal Democrats	Sandra Lawman	506		
Independent	Thomas Butler	506		
Liberal Democrats	Smarajit Roy	461		
Liberal Democrats	Marcus Czarnecki	449		
Green	Susan Black	192		
Conservative	Sheila Angel	165		
Conservative	Hector Helden	136		
Conservative	Barbara Wimbourne	118		
Turnout				
Labour hold		Swing		
Labour hold		Swing		
Labour gain from Independent		Swing		

=== 1993 by-election ===
The by-election took place on 4 March 1993, following the resignation of John Tuite.

1993 Angell by-election
Party	Candidate	Votes	%	±%
Liberal Democrats	Ray Woolford	841		
Labour	Stephen Cooley	778		
Conservative	Peter Cannon	350		
Green	William Collins	74		
Independent	Stephen Bradshaw	42		
Turnout			28.6	
Liberal Democrats gain from Labour		Swing		

=== 1990 election ===
The election took place on 3 May 1990.

1990 Lambeth London Borough Council election: Angell
Party	Candidate	Votes	%	±%
Labour	Stephen French	1,857	66.67	
Labour	Lesley Hammond	1,752		
Labour	John Tuite	1,664		
Conservative	Stewart Cowell	490	18.01	
Conservative	Tracy Fawthrop	488		
Conservative	Mark Pugh	446		
Green	David Lovatt	404	15.32	
Registered electors		7,655		
Turnout		2,683	35.05	
Rejected ballots		5	0.19	
Labour hold		Swing		
Labour hold		Swing		
Labour hold		Swing		

=== 1986 election ===
The election took place on 8 May 1986.

1986 Lambeth London Borough Council election: Angell
Party	Candidate	Votes	%	±%
Labour	Lesley Hammond	2,049		
Labour	Stephen French	2,013		
Labour	David Morgan	1,886		
Conservative	Constance HoImes	499		
Conservative	Frederick HoImes	488		
Conservative	Paul Williamson	446		
Alliance	Maureen Green	317		
Alliance	Christopher Berry	311		
Alliance	David Warner	278		
Turnout				
Labour hold		Swing		
Labour hold		Swing		
Labour hold		Swing		

=== 1982 election ===
The election took place on 6 May 1982.

1982 Lambeth London Borough Council election: Angell
Party	Candidate	Votes	%	±%
Labour	Helen Crossfield	1,173		
Labour	Graham Norwood	1,126		
Labour	William Bowring	1,125		
Alliance	Edmund Gray	890		
Alliance	Paul Wilce	840		
Alliance	Mary Wilkinson	827		
Conservative	Anna Hunter	402		
Conservative	Eileen Thorne	370		
Conservative	Gillian Turner	367		
Turnout				
Labour hold		Swing		
Labour hold		Swing		
Labour hold		Swing		

=== 1978 election ===
The election took place on 4 May 1978.

1978 Lambeth London Borough Council election: Angell
Party	Candidate	Votes	%	±%
Labour	Hugh Griffiths	1,178		
Labour	Lesley Hammond	1,171		
Labour	Paul Moore	1,155		
Conservative	Maureen Clarke	534		
Conservative	David Palmer	479		
Conservative	Richard Walsh	450		
National Front	Clifford Holland	105		
National Front	Philip Turner	101		
National Front	Catherine Williams	93		
West Indian Block	Cynthia Tyrell	48		
West Indian Block	Kenneth Dixon	45		
West Indian Block	Andrew Bloomfield	34		
Turnout				
Labour hold		Swing		
Labour hold		Swing		
Labour hold		Swing		

== 1964–1978 Lambeth council elections ==
External image
- Angell ward boundaries from 1965 to 1978

=== 1976 by-election ===
The by-election took place on 18 November 1976.

1976 Angell by-election
Party	Candidate	Votes	%	±%
Labour	Marie Montaut	701		
Conservative	Gerald Hartup	481		
Housewife	Kathleen Mott	224		
National Party	Joan Sandland	165		
Socialist Workers	Europe Singh	34		
Anti-National Front	Alan Whereat	28		
United Anti-Fascist	Evan Sparks	17		
Turnout			20.8	
Labour hold		Swing		

=== 1974 election ===
The election took place on 2 May 1974.

1974 Lambeth London Borough Council election: Angell
Party	Candidate	Votes	%	±%
Labour	C. Dryland	1,121		
Labour	S. Fitchett	1,045		
Labour	R. Shiner	992		
Conservative	P. Golds	383		
Turnout				
Labour hold		Swing		
Labour hold		Swing		
Labour hold		Swing		

=== 1971 election ===
The election took place on 13 May 1971.

1971 Lambeth London Borough Council election: Angell
Party	Candidate	Votes	%	±%
Labour	C. Dryland	1,154		
Labour	G. Carey	1,132		
Labour	S. Fitchett	1,065		
Conservative	R. Clinch	1,053		
Conservative	J. Hodgson	1,045		
Conservative	P. Whitelaw	989		
Communist	J. Skipp	180		
Turnout		6,618		
Labour hold		Swing		
Labour hold		Swing		
Labour hold		Swing		

=== 1968 election ===
The election took place on 9 May 1968.

1968 Lambeth London Borough Council election: Angell
Party	Candidate	Votes	%	±%
Labour	C. Dryland	1,154		
Labour	G. Carey	1,132		
Labour	S. Fitchett	1,065		
Conservative	R. Clinch	1,053		
Conservative	D. Hodgson	1,045		
Conservative	P. Whitelaw	989		
Communist	J. Skipp	180		
Turnout				
Labour hold		Swing		
Labour hold		Swing		
Labour hold		Swing		

=== 1964 election ===
The election took place on 7 May 1964.

1964 Lambeth London Borough Council election: Angell
Party	Candidate	Votes	%	±%
Labour	F. Kings	1,574	71.7	
Labour	V. Kings	1,547		
Labour	G. Carey	1,531		
Conservative	D. Brocklebank	414	18.9	
Conservative	D. Stephens	412		
Conservative	D. Bonass	397		
Liberal	R. Hay	115	5.2	
Liberal	C. Etherington	108		
Liberal	N. Terry	94		
Communist	A. Kay	92	4.2	
Turnout		2,170	19.0	
Registered electors		11,405		
Labour win (new seat)				
Labour win (new seat)				
Labour win (new seat)				
