= 2018 Lambeth London Borough Council election =

- 3 May 2018

All 63 seats to Lambeth London Borough Council 32 seats needed for a majority
- Registered: 231,772
- Turnout: 34.3%
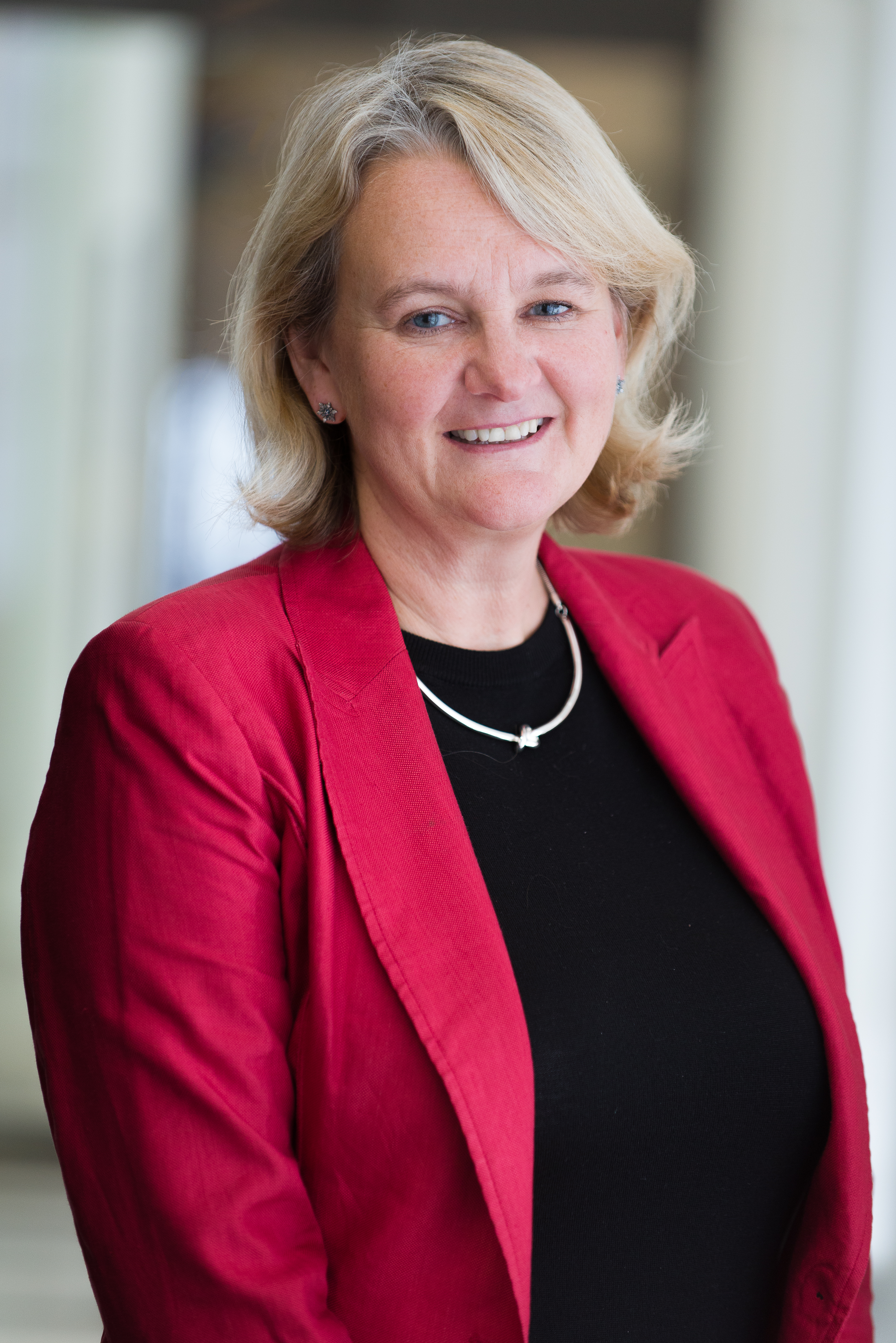

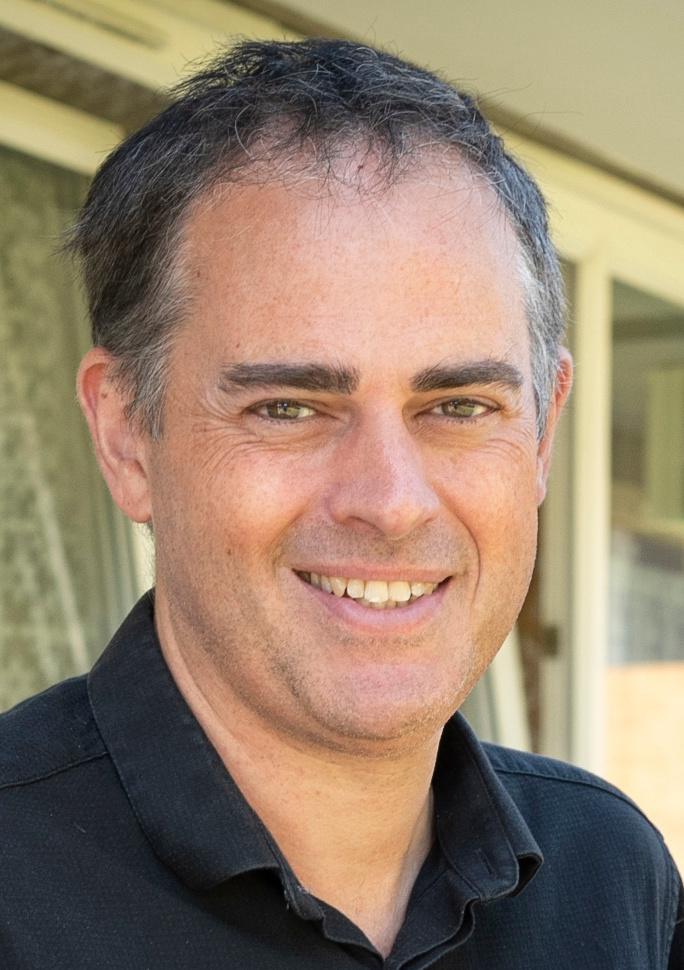
	First party	Second party	Third party
			Con
Leader	Lib Peck	Jonathan Bartley	Tim Briggs
Party	Labour	Green	Conservative
Leader since	29 November 2012	15 May 2018	May 2014
Leader's seat	Thornton	St Leonard's	Clapham Common
Last election	59 seats, 49.7%	1 seat, 15.5%	3 seats, 14.5%
Seats won	57	5	1
Seat change	▼2	▲4	▼2
Popular vote	124,249	43,261	29,483
Percentage	54.4%	18.9%	12.9%
Swing	▲4.7%	▲3.4%	▼1.6%
- Map of the results of the 2018 Lambeth council election. Conservatives in blue, Greens in green and Labour in red.
Leader before election
Lib Peck
Labour
Leader after election
Lib Peck
Labour

The 2018 Lambeth London Borough Council election took place on 3 May 2018 alongside other local elections in London, to elect members of Lambeth London Borough Council in England. The election saw Labour remain in control of Lambeth Council with a slightly reduced majority, winning over 90% of the seats. The Green Party achieved its best-ever result in the borough, winning five seats and becoming the official opposition and the largest Green group in London.

The Green Party finished the runner up in nine of the wards, the Conservatives and Liberal Democrats in five wards and Labour in two.

== Election result ==
2018 Lambeth Borough Council election
Party	Candidates	Seats	Gains	Losses	Net gain/loss	Seats %	Votes %	Votes	+/−
Labour	63	57	2	4	▼2	90.5	54.4	124,249	+4.7
Green	61	5	4	0	▲4	7.3	18.9	43,261	+3.4
Conservative	63	1	0	2	▼2	1.6	12.9	29,483	–1.6
Liberal Democrats	63	0	0	0	Steady	0.0	12.0	27,292	–0.8
Women's Equality	3	0	0	0	Steady	0.0	0.7	1,534	N/A
UKIP	12	0	0	0	Steady	0.0	0.3	765	–5.1
Independent	2	0	0	0	Steady	0.0	0.3	749	–0.1
Herne Hill Community & Library Campaign	1	0	0	0	Steady	0.0	0.3	705	N/A
Pirate	1	0	0	0	Steady	0.0	0.1	127	–0.1
TUSC	2	0	0	0	Steady	0.0	<0.1	112	–1.3
Duma Polska	1	0	0	0	Steady	0.0	<0.1	37	N/A
Federalist Party of the United Kingdom	1	0	0	0	Steady	0.0	<0.1	26	N/A

== Council composition ==
The election saw Labour remain in control of Lambeth Council with a majority reduced by two seats. The party were wiped out in the St Leonard's ward, and they also lost a councillor in both Gipsy Hill and Herne Hill wards.

For the first time since the creation of the council, the Greens became the official opposition with five councillors, including Jonathan Bartley, who is the co-leader of the Green Party.

The Conservatives were reduced down to a single seat in Clapham Common, after Labour gained two of the seats they had previously held, despite the Conservative vote share in the ward increasing. The Conservatives failed to gain their target wards of Thurlow Park, Clapham Town and Larkhall.

The Liberal Democrats failed to make any gains at the election. However, they did comes second to Labour in their target wards.

Rachel Heywood, a former Labour councillor in Coldharbour sought re-election as an independent candidate. Heywood failed to win the seat and finished in 6th place, behind both Green Party candidates but ahead of the Conservatives and Liberal Democrats.

The Women's Equality Party received 8% of the vote in the Brixton Hill ward, finishing in 5th place, ahead of two of the Green Party candidates, the Conservatives and Liberal Democrats. The party also stood candidates in the wards of Prince's and Ferndale.

UKIP saw their vote share largely decrease in the wards they stood in.

The Federalist Party polled 0.2% of the vote in the Prince's ward with the Pirate Party polling 0.2% in the ward of Vassall.

Council composition following the election in May 2018:

57	5	1
Labour	Green	C

=== Proportionality ===
The disproportionality of the 2018 election was 31.00 using the Gallagher Index.

Political Party	Vote Share	Seat Share	Difference	Difference²
Labour	51.7	90.5	38.8	1505.4
Green	19.0	7.9	11.1	123.2
Conservative	12.6	1.59	11.0	121.2
Liberal Democrat	12.3	0.00	12.3	151.3
Other	4.1	0.00	4.1	16.8
			TOTAL	1917.8
			TOTAL /2	958.9
			√TOTAL /2	31.0

== Results by ward ==
Candidates shown below are confirmed candidates. An asterisk * indicates an incumbent Councillor seeking re-election.

=== Bishop's ===
Bishop's (3 seats)
Party	Candidate	Votes	%	±%
Labour	Jen Moseley*	1,126	46.1	+6.6
Labour	Kevin Craig*	1,094	44.8	+6.9
Labour	Ibrahim Dogus	1,090	44.7	+9.9
Liberal Democrats	Audrey Eager	713	29.2	−4.7
Liberal Democrats	Adrian Hyyrylainen-Trett	691	28.3	−5.2
Liberal Democrats	Charley Hasted	606	24.8	−3.0
Conservative	James Bellis	311	12.7	+2.3
Green	Michael Armstrong	292	12.0	+1.1
Conservative	Glyn Chambers	286	11.7	+1.3
Green	James Wallace	253	10.4	−0.1
Conservative	Peter Wilde	243	10.0	−0.1
Green	Gay Lee	189	7.7	−2.0
UKIP	Elizabeth Jones	86	3.5	−5.4
UKIP	Gavin Gibbs	72	3.0	N/A
UKIP	David Poulden	69	2.8	N/A
Turnout		2,444	33.4	–3.5
Registered electors		7,328		
Labour hold				
Labour hold				
Labour hold				

=== Brixton Hill ===
Brixton Hill (3 seats)
Party	Candidate	Votes	%	±%
Labour Co-op	Maria Kay	2,142	59.3	+9.2
Labour Co-op	Adrian Garden*	2,015	55.8	+4.1
Labour Co-op	Martin Tiedemann*	1,796	49.8	+6.2
Green	Gwen Buck	856	23.7	+0.8
Women's Equality	Janet Baker	842	23.3	N/A
Green	Richard Bultitude	517	14.3	−7.2
Green	Will Eaves	478	13.2	−6.9
Liberal Democrats	Sarah Lewis	420	11.6	+4.8
Conservative	Tamara Bailey	389	10.8	−0.8
Conservative	Lavinia Cartwright	349	9.7	−1.0
Conservative	Savill Young	319	8.8	+0.1
Liberal Democrats	Peter Portelli	222	6.1	−0.4
Liberal Democrats	Jonathan Price	192	5.3	−1.1
Turnout		3,619	31.2	–0.2
Registered electors		11,611		
Labour Co-op hold				
Labour Co-op hold				
Labour Co-op hold				

=== Clapham Common ===
Clapham Common (3 seats)
Party	Candidate	Votes	%	±%
Labour	Joe Corry-Roake	1,455	43.3	+10.7
Labour	Joanna Reynolds	1,432	42.6	+10.4
Conservative	Tim Briggs*	1,325	39.4	−7.9
Labour	Tim Goodwin	1,293	38.5	+3.7
Conservative	David Frost	1,289	38.3	−1.0
Conservative	Leslie Maruziva	1,164	34.6	−4.5
Green	Joanna Eaves	441	13.1	−1.7
Liberal Democrats	Charles Jenkins	439	13.1	+4.0
Liberal Democrats	Carita Ogden	320	9.5	+1.1
Liberal Democrats	Richard Newby	317	9.4	+1.6
Green	Nick Humberstone	292	8.7	−4.0
Green	Kerstin Selander	269	8.0	−1.1
Turnout		3,372	33.1	+3.3
Registered electors		10,195		
Labour gain from Conservative				
Labour gain from Conservative				
Conservative hold				

=== Clapham Town ===
Clapham Town (3 seats)
Party	Candidate	Votes	%	±%
Labour	Linda Bray*	1,901	53.1	−0.1
Labour	Nigel Haselden *	1,840	51.4	+0.7
Labour	Christopher Wellbelove*	1,813	50.7	−0.3
Conservative	Tim Bennett	978	27.3	+0.5
Conservative	John Sunderland	908	25.4	−0.6
Conservative	Charley Jarrett	871	24.3	+0.9
Green	Kat Beach	474	13.2	+1.6
Liberal Democrats	Julie Fox	398	11.1	+4.1
Green	Marion Prideaux	395	11.0	−0.8
Liberal Democrats	Marietta Stuart	389	10.9	+7.0
Liberal Democrats	Rodney Ovenden	276	7.7	+4.3
Green	Shahzada Saeed	266	7.4	−2.4
Turnout		3,589	32.7	–1.0
Registered electors		10,994		
Labour hold				
Labour hold				
Labour hold				

=== Coldharbour ===
Coldharbour (3 seats)
Party	Candidate	Votes	%	±%
Labour Co-op	Emma Nye	2,325	66.8	+3.3
Labour Co-op	Donatus Anyanwu *	2,257	64.8	+7.5
Labour Co-op	Matthew Parr *	1,975	56.7	−1.3
Green	Michael Groce	761	21.9	+0.8
Green	Rashid Nix	683	19.6	+1.4
Independent	Rachel Heywood *	660	19.0	N/A
Conservative	Michael Johnson	228	6.5	+0.1
Conservative	Amy Hennessy	217	6.2	−0.1
Conservative	Yvonne Stewart-Williams	189	5.4	−5.9
Liberal Democrats	Olivier Bertin	182	5.2	−1.2
Liberal Democrats	Henry M^{c}Morrow	180	5.2	+1.6
Liberal Democrats	Clive Lewis	173	5.0	+1.4
Turnout		3,487	28.7	–2.0
Registered electors		12,165		
Labour Co-op gain from Independent				
Labour Co-op hold				
Labour Co-op gain from Independent				

On 29 July 2018, Cllr Parr died; this subsequently triggered a by-election on 13 September 2018.

=== Ferndale ===
Ferndale (3 seats)
Party	Candidate	Votes	%	±%
Labour Co-op	Jess Leigh	1,853	59.9	+3.5
Labour Co-op	Joshua Lindsey	1,685	54.4	+0.1
Labour Co-op	Irfan Mohammed	1,649	53.3	+5.3
Green	Rachel Alexander	715	23.1	+3.1
Green	Indar Picton-Howell	459	14.8	−5.0
Liberal Democrats	Benjammin Austin	455	14.7	+6.5
Conservative	Katy Slack	384	12.4	3.4
Conservative	Craig Barrett	373	12.1	−2.1
Women's Equality	Leila Fazal	366	11.8	N/A
Conservative	David Macbeth-Richardson	359	11.6	−2.2
Liberal Democrats	Aedan Pope	328	10.6	+3.5
Liberal Democrats	John Siraut	263	8.5	+1.7
Turnout		3,113	25.7	–1.8
Registered electors		12,100		
Labour Co-op hold				
Labour Co-op hold				
Labour Co-op hold				

=== Gipsy Hill ===
Gipsy Hill (3 seats)
Party	Candidate	Votes	%	±%
Labour	Jennifer Braithwaite*	2,063	40.7	−16.7
Labour	Matthew Bennett*	2,054	40.6	−18.4
Green	Pete Elliott	1,922	37.9	+28.3
Green	Becki Newell	1,903	37.6	+29.3
Labour	Luke Murphy*	1,778	35.1	−22.8
Green	Paul Rocks	1,647	32.5	+25.7
Conservative	James Davis	271	5.4	−6.1
Conservative	Irene Kimm	229	4.5	−6.9
Conservative	Simon Hooberman	208	4.1	−7.0
Liberal Democrats	Alexander Davies	132	2.6	−1.7
Liberal Democrats	Samar Riaz	124	2.4	−1.8
Liberal Democrats	Alexander Haylett	101	2.0	−1.5
UKIP	John Dodds	42	0.8	−2.9
UKIP	David Kennett	36	0.7	N/A
UKIP	Dafydd Morris	31	0.6	N/A
Turnout		5,076	48.6	+11.0
Registered electors		10,456		
Labour hold				
Labour hold				
Green gain from Labour				

=== Herne Hill ===
Herne Hill (3 seats)
Party	Candidate	Votes	%	±%
Green	Becca Thackray	2,365	45.2	+15.5
Labour	Jim Dickson*	2,335	44.7	−7.3
Labour	Pauline George	2,246	43.0	−10.0
Labour	Jack Holborn*	2,114	40.4	−7.7
Green	Nick Christian	2,060	39.4	+11.6
Green	Matt Reynolds	2,049	39.2	+15.0
Herne Hill Community & Libraries Campaign	Nick Edwards	705	13.5	N/A
Conservative	Claire Baker	308	5.9	−4.4
Liberal Democrats	Poppy Hasted	274	5.2	−2.5
Liberal Democrats	Rachel Lester	266	5.1	−0.2
Conservative	Dick Tooze	263	5.0	−3.5
Conservative	Anton Richards	228	4.4	−3.9
Liberal Democrats	Luke Sandford	171	3.3	−0.8
Turnout		5,236	44.6	+4.0
Registered electors		11,754		
Green gain from Labour				
Labour hold				
Labour hold				

=== Knight's Hill ===
Knight's Hill (3 seats)
Party	Candidate	Votes	%	±%
Labour	Jane Pickard*	2,378	66.4	+2.8
Labour	Jackie Meldrum*	2,326	64.9	+0.9
Labour	Sonia Winifred*	2,033	56.8	+0.8
Green	Torla Evans	637	17.8	+4.4
Green	Robert Threadgold	504	14.1	+2.7
Green	Duncan Eastoe	441	12.3	+1.6
Conservative	Shirley Cosgrave	425	11.9	−1.8
Conservative	Raymond Walker	414	11.6	−1.4
Conservative	Edward Watkins	362	9.4	−1.8
Liberal Democrats	Jeremy Baker	345	9.6	+2.1
Liberal Democrats	Shiraz Engineer	247	6.9	−0.1
Liberal Democrats	Liz Maffei	230	6.4	+0.5
Turnout		3,589	34.6	+0.8
Registered electors		10,372		
Labour hold				
Labour hold				
Labour hold				

=== Larkhall ===
Larkhall (3 seats)
Party	Candidate	Votes	%	±%
Labour	Tina Valcarcel*	2,063	62.0	+12.4
Labour	Andy Wilson *	1,893	56.9	+11.8
Labour	Tim Windle	1,751	52.6	−1.7
Green	Colleen Campbell	513	15.4	−1.0
Conservative	Thomas Mytton	501	15.1	−4.4
Liberal Democrats	Vivienne Baines	458	13.8	+3.9
Conservative	Abiola Kingsley-Osaiga	455	13.7	−3.4
Green	Jo Parkes	415	12.5	−2.3
Conservative	Leila Abdi-Yaasen	411	12.3	−3.2
Liberal Democrats	Malcolm Baines	392	11.8	+3.7
Green	Nick Hattersley	386	11.6	−1.3
Liberal Democrats	John Medway	354	10.6	+4.1
Turnout		3,343	25.8	–1.2
Registered electors		12,957		
Labour hold				
Labour hold				
Labour hold				

=== Oval ===
Oval (3 seats)
Party	Candidate	Votes	%	±%
Labour	Claire Holland*	1,983	49.3	−1.7
Labour	Jack Hopkins*	1,836	45.7	−4.7
Labour	Phillip Normal	1,719	42.8	−5.9
Liberal Democrats	Kathryn Grant	1,236	30.7	+8.8
Liberal Democrats	Stéphane Croce	1,210	30.1	+11.5
Liberal Democrats	Mike Hillier	1,076	26.8	+12.8
Green	Michael Keane	596	14.8	+1.0
Conservative	Joshua Gething	461	11.5	−1.5
Green	Cath Potter	458	11.4	−0.2
Conservative	Peter Goves	455	11.3	−1.1
Conservative	James Hallett	408	10.1	−0.6
Green	Pat Price-Tomes	311	7.7	−2.8
Turnout		4,042	34.6	–3.6
Registered electors		11,698		
Labour hold				
Labour hold				
Labour hold				

=== Prince's ===
Prince's (3 seats)
Party	Candidate	Votes	%	±%
Labour	David Amos*	2,395	58.3	+2.7
Labour	Jon Davies	2,325	56.6	+5.3
Labour	Joanne Simpson*	2,256	55.0	+6.1
Liberal Democrats	Richard Hardman	644	15.7	+5.2
Green	Helen Gardiner	591	14.4	+1.4
Conservative	Claire Barker	570	13.9	−4.2
Liberal Democrats	Colette Thomas	542	13.2	+3.7
Conservative	Michael Jefferson	482	11.7	−5.0
Conservative	Jon Harrison	471	11.5	−2.9
Liberal Democrats	Christopher Keating	461	11.2	+2.6
Green	Fern Lindsay	422	10.3	−1.1
Women's Equality	Eleanor Hemmens	326	7.9	N/A
Green	Nick Hemus	318	7.7	−2.5
UKIP	Alan Bowles	101	2.5	−5.4
UKIP	Robert Stephenson	75	1.8	N/A
UKIP	Mattias Tornstrand	67	1.6	N/A
Federalist Party	Stuart Clark	26	0.6	N/A
Turnout		4,128	35.0	–2.7
Registered electors		11,799		
Labour hold				
Labour hold				
Labour hold				

=== St Leonard's ===
St Leonard's (3 seats)
Party	Candidate	Votes	%	±%
Green	Scott Ainslie*	2,141	48.2	+16.7
Green	Jonathan Bartley	2,080	46.8	+16.9
Green	Nicole Griffiths	2,006	45.1	+20.1
Labour	Saleha Jaffer *	1,677	37.7	+6.3
Labour	Rob Hill *	1,676	37.7	+4.7
Labour	Stephen Donnelly	1,673	37.6	+7.1
Conservative	Wendy Newall	439	9.9	−1.8
Conservative	Scott Simmonds	383	8.6	−2.6
Conservative	Neil Salt	337	7.6	−3.1
Liberal Democrats	Jennifer Keen	188	4.2	−20.5
Liberal Democrats	Fiona MacKenzie	159	3.6	−16.4
Liberal Democrats	Richard Malins	108	2.4	−16.4
Turnout		4,453	39.6	+4.9
Registered electors		11,250		
Green hold				
Green gain from Labour				
Green gain from Labour				

=== Stockwell ===
Stockwell (3 seats)
Party	Candidate	Votes	%	±%
Labour	Lucy Caldicott	2,107	59.8	+2.4
Labour	Dr Mahamed Hashi	1,828	51.9	+1.5
Labour	Mohammed Jaser	1,778	50.5	+0.4
Liberal Democrats	Susanna Flood	598	17.0	+1.4
Green	Catherine Dawkins	592	16.8	+2.6
Conservative	Keith Best	521	14.8	+0.4
Conservative	Sarah Barr	505	14.3	−2.9
Conservative	Paul Mawdsley	469	13.3	+1.1
Green	Tom Wood	433	12.3	+0.1
Liberal Democrats	Andrew Horsler	405	11.5	−0.3
Liberal Democrats	Andrew Thurburn	373	10.6	−0.2
Green	Martin Dore	352	10.0	−0.4
TUSC	Lisa Bainbridge	72	2.0	−1.9
TUSC	Steven Nally	40	1.1	N/A
Duma Polska	Tadeusz Slaski	37	1.1	N/A
Turnout		3,537	31.8	–0.8
Registered electors		11,109		
Labour hold				
Labour hold				
Labour hold				

=== Streatham Hill ===
Streatham Hill (3 seats)
Party	Candidate	Votes	%	±%
Labour	Liz Atkins*	2,253	60.3	+15.5
Labour	Rezina Chowdhury*	2,121	56.8	+16.0
Labour	Iain Simpson*	1,912	51.2	+13.9
Green	Will Aspinall	656	17.6	+4.3
Green	Chris Holt	608	16.3	+5.7
Conservative	Alexa Bailey	558	14.9	+4.0
Green	Leon Maurice-Jones	517	13.8	+3.1
Conservative	Simon Hemsley	505	13.5	+4.6
Conservative	Kushal Patel	469	12.6	+4.4
Liberal Democrats	Ashley Lumsden	404	10.8	−21.0
Liberal Democrats	Ishbel Brown	379	10.1	−22.7
Liberal Democrats	Roger Giess	360	9.6	−18.8
Turnout		3,751	33.7	–2.7
Registered electors		11,133		
Labour hold				
Labour hold				
Labour hold				

=== Streatham South ===
Streatham South (3 seats)
Party	Candidate	Votes	%	±%
Labour	Danial Adilypour*	2,217	64.5	+6.1
Labour	Clair Wilcox*	2,207	64.3	+6.1
Labour	John Kazantzis*	2,187	63.7	+3.6
Conservative	Russell Newall	570	16.6	+0.8
Conservative	Helen Smith	539	15.7	−1.8
Conservative	Chris Paling	440	12.8	−1.7
Green	David Robinson	365	10.6	−1.4
Green	Pete Johnson	312	9.1	+0.6
Liberal Democrats	Simon Drage	277	8.1	−0.7
Green	Charmian Kenner	269	7.8	+0.1
Liberal Democrats	Matthew Bryant	241	7.0	−1.1
Liberal Democrats	David Hare	215	6.3	−1.7
UKIP	John Plume	76	2.2	N/A
UKIP	Simon Harman	66	1.9	N/A
UKIP	Johan Ward	44	1.3	N/A
Turnout		3,446	34.0	–0.1
Registered electors		10,149		
Labour hold				
Labour hold				
Labour hold				

=== Streatham Wells ===
Streatham Wells (3 seats)
Party	Candidate	Votes	%	±%
Labour	Malcolm Clark*	2,151	50.6	+5.2
Labour	Marianna Masters	2,065	48.6	+9.3
Labour	Mohammed Seedat*	1,975	46.5	+6.8
Liberal Democrats	Dominic Leigh	1,281	30.1	−4.4
Liberal Democrats	Helen Thompson	1,261	29.7	−2.4
Liberal Democrats	Eloka Ikegbunam	1,216	28.6	+6.4
Green	Sheila Freeman	544	12.8	+2.6
Green	Becca Deegan	532	12.5	+1.4
Green	Clifford Fleming	351	8.3	−0.5
Conservative	Lisabeth Liell	350	8.2	+1.6
Conservative	Russell Henman	340	8.0	+0.6
Conservative	Teresa Tunstall	325	7.6	+1.7
Turnout		4,263	37.9	–1.5
Registered electors		11,247		
Labour hold				
Labour hold				
Labour hold				

=== Thornton ===
Thornton (3 seats)
Party	Candidate	Votes	%	±%
Labour	Lib Peck *	2,140	64.6	+11.7
Labour	Jane Edbrooke*	1,999	60.3	+8.8
Labour	Ed Davie *	1,990	60.0	+11.0
Conservative	Martin Reid	545	16.4	+1.0
Conservative	Michael Spencer	511	15.4	+4.2
Conservative	Vernon de Maynard	489	14.8	+1.6
Green	Katherine Curran	388	11.7	+3.9
Green	Adrian Audsley	364	11.0	+2.6
Liberal Democrats	Duncan Brack	329	9.9	+3.9
Liberal Democrats	Rebecca MacNair	328	9.9	+3.6
Green	Anja Thies	292	8.8	+2.5
Liberal Democrats	Conor Doherty	235	7.1	+1.8
Turnout		3,320	34.7	–8.6
Registered electors		9,582		
Labour hold				
Labour hold				
Labour hold				

Jane Edbrooke was previously an Oval ward councillor (2010–2018).

=== Thurlow Park ===
Thurlow Park (3)
Party	Candidate	Votes	%	±%
Labour Co-op	Anna Birley*	2,377	55.9	+2.2
Labour Co-op	Fred Cowell*	2,308	54.3	+5.1
Labour Co-op	Peter Ely	2,076	48.8	+4.0
Conservative	Kelly Ben-Maimon	820	19.3	−8.2
Conservative	Elia Carvalho	820	19.3	−6.2
Conservative	Jack Kelly	761	17.9	−5.7
Liberal Democrats	Kathy Erasmus	691	16.3	+9.8
Liberal Democrats	Doug Buist	649	15.3	+9.3
Liberal Democrats	Bryan Mahon-Ball	576	13.6	+7.7
Green	Alice Playle	512	12.0	−3.6
Green	Danielle Montrose-Francis	461	10.8	−1.8
Green	Dale Mathers	458	10.8	−1.7
Independent	Robin Lambert	89	2.1	−4.3
Turnout		4,258	41.0	+2.0
Registered electors		10,375		
Labour Co-op hold				
Labour Co-op hold				
Labour Co-op hold				

=== Tulse Hill ===
Tulse Hill (3 seats)
Party	Candidate	Votes	%	±%
Labour	Mary Atkins *	2,289	61.3	−1.2
Labour	Marcia Cameron *	2,271	60.8	+4.6
Labour	Ben Kind * (Note: Incumbent councillor for Bishop's ward.)	2,102	56.3	−0.7
Green	Gerlinde Gniewosz	947	25.3	+4.9
Green	Kate Whitehead	838	22.4	+2.8
Green	Andy Plant	795	21.3	+4.4
Liberal Democrats	Matthew Coldrick	318	8.5	+1.2
Liberal Democrats	Terry Curtis	289	7.7	+1.0
Conservative	Claire Gardener	280	7.5	−0.9
Conservative	Ed Gormley	255	6.8	−0.2
Conservative	Roger Green	235	6.3	−0.6
Liberal Democrats	Scott Liddle	213	5.7	+0.6
Turnout		3,750	32.6	+0.3
Registered electors		11,503		
Labour hold				
Labour hold				
Labour hold				

=== Vassall ===
Vassall (3 seats)
Party	Candidate	Votes	%	±%
Labour	Jacqui Dyer*	2,296	62.3	+9.1
Labour	Annie Gallop*	2,165	58.7	+8.0
Labour	Paul Gadsby*	2,120	57.5	+5.2
Green	Sarah Mynott	594	16.1	−2.1
Green	Florence Pollock	505	13.7	±0.0
Liberal Democrats	Kate Noble	476	12.9	−0.6
Liberal Democrats	Juliet Hodges	474	12.9	+1.1
Green	Bruno Combelles	471	12.8	+0.1
Liberal Democrats	John Lubbock	433	11.7	+4.0
Conservative	Glen Promnitz	338	9.2	−4.9
Conservative	Gareth Wallace	318	8.6	−3.0
Conservative	Stuart Barr	257	7.0	−6.7
Pirate	Mark Chapman	127	3.4	−0.5
Turnout		3,702	30.9	–0.2
Registered electors		11,995		
Labour hold				
Labour hold				
Labour hold				

== By-elections ==
=== Coldharbour ===
The by-election was caused by the death of Matthew Parr.

Coldharbour by-election, 13 September 2018
Party	Candidate	Votes	%	±%
Labour	Scarlett O'Hara	1,739	58.2	▼7.8
Green	Michael Groce	912	30.5	▲15.0
Liberal Democrats	Doug Buist	148	5.0	▼0.4
Conservative	Yvonne Stewart-Williams	119	4.0	▼2.4
Women's Equality	Sian Fogden	47	1.6	N/A
UKIP	Robert Stephenson	21	0.7	N/A
Majority		827	27.7	▼22.8
Turnout		2,994	24.8	
Labour hold		Swing		

=== Thornton (February 2019) ===
The by-election was caused by the resignation of Jane Edbrooke.

Thornton by-election, 7 February 2019
Party	Candidate	Votes	%	±%
Labour	Stephen Donnelly	1,154	44.7	▼18.2
Liberal Democrats	Rebecca MacNair	845	32.8	▲23.1
Green	Adrian Audsley	251	9.7	▼1.7
Conservative	Martin Reid	247	9.6	▼6.4
Women's Equality	Leila Fazal	46	1.8	N/A
UKIP	John Plume	36	1.4	N/A
Majority		309	11.9	▼52.0
Turnout			27.5	
Labour hold		Swing		

=== Thornton (April 2019) ===
The by-election was caused by Lib Peck who resigned as Leader of Lambeth Council and as a councillor in order to take the role as the Director of the Mayor of London’s newly established Violence Reduction Unit.

Thornton by-election, 11 April 2019
Party	Candidate	Votes	%	±%
Labour	Nanda Manley-Browne	998	41.5	▼21.4
Liberal Democrats	Matthew Bryant	979	40.7	▲30.1
Green	Adrian Audsley	171	7.1	▼4.3
Conservative	Martin Reid	166	6.9	▼9.1
Women's Equality	Leila Fazal	53	2.2	N/A
UKIP	John Plume	39	1.6	N/A
Majority		19	0.7	▼63.2
Turnout			25.5	
Labour hold		Swing		
