= Coldharbour Lane =

Road in south London

Coordinates: 51.4659°N 0.1024°W

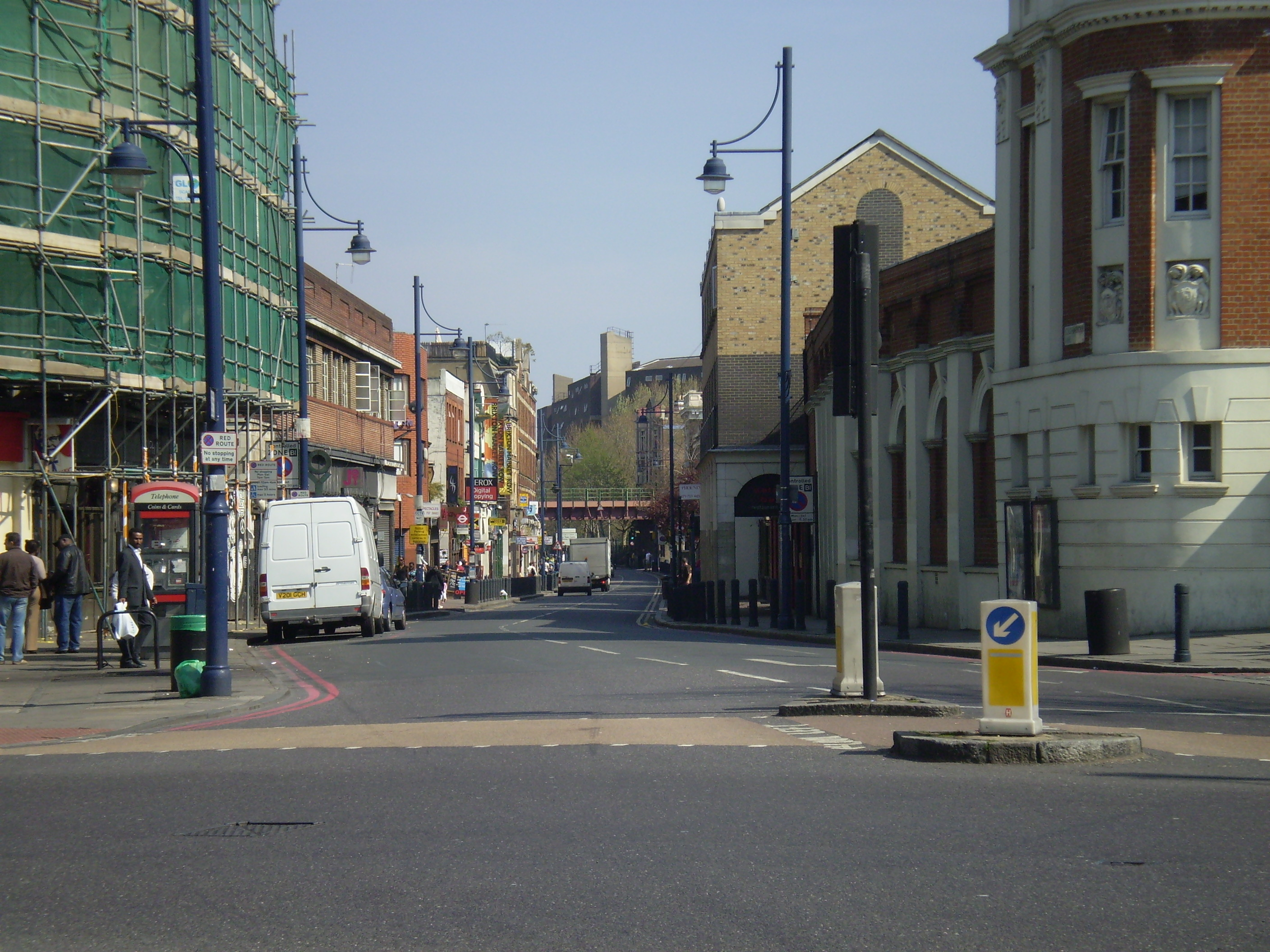
Coldharbour Lane seen from Acre Lane.

Coldharbour Lane is a road in south London, England, that leads south-westwards from Camberwell to Brixton. The road is over 1 mile (1.6 km) long with a mixture of residential, business and retail buildings – the stretch of Coldharbour Lane near Brixton Market contains shops, bars and restaurants. Between the junctions of Coldharbour Lane and Denmark Hill in Camberwell SE5 and Coldharbour Lane and Denmark Road lies part of the boundary between Lambeth and Southwark boroughs. The other end of Coldharbour Lane meets Acre Lane in central Brixton to form the A2217.

The Loughborough Junction area, surrounding the railway station, marks the approximate centre point of Coldharbour Lane and the change in postcode from SE5 to SW9.

== History ==
Former British Prime Minister John Major lived in a flat at 144 Coldharbour Lane when a child from 1955 to 1959.

The lane close by Brixton Market became derelict by the mid-1960s, when many drug houses flourished dealing mainly in cannabis.

In 1981 the Brixton riots occurred in roads near Coldharbour Lane and some windows were broken on the street itself. With the support of community leaders and shop owners, plans were put in place to set up a mini-police station on Coldharbour Lane in the former premises of a drug dealer. Police Safer Neighbourhoods Teams worked from number 411 with another base near Loughborough Junction at number 236. Both closed in 2019.

=== Origins of the name ===
A possible derivation of the name is Cool Arbour Lane, dating from the time Camberwell was in the country. This is cited in 'The Streets' by Anthony Quinn (2012) as the place the Camberwell beauty was first sighted.

A "cold harbour" was an uninhabited shelter for travellers, often along a well-known route, somewhat similar to a modern bothy. Unlike an inn, there were no staff, food or drink to be had. There would be a roof, door and possibly a simple hearth, although it was the traveller's responsibility to gather fuel. They were generally little more than open-faced barns or animal shelters.

J. C. Hahn, in Notes and Queries Series 3, 7, 253–254 (1 April 1865) and later in Series 3, 8, 71–72 (22 July 1865) wrote an article entitled "Remarks on the Origin of 'Cold Harbour'". In this, the author remarks upon relatively early equivalent place names in Germany and traces back the origins of Coldharbour/Cold Harbour to the German kalte Herberge. There is a village in Germany and another in Austria called Kaltherberg. This etymology was accepted by the authors of the Merriam-Webster dictionary. Hahn concludes that "our Cold Harbour was a name given to any cold abode, cold retreat, brought over to England by our Saxon ancestors—Cold Harbour = Cold Station, Cold House, Cold Lodge," and thus has a wider meaning than that attributed by the supporters of a basic type of lodgings.

"Coldharbour" also survives as the name of a village in Surrey, and Bristol has both a "Coldharbour Road" and a "Cold Harbour Lane".

Coldharbour Lane also gives its name to Coldharbour ward for elections to Lambeth Council from 2002 to 2022.

== Crime ==
=== April 1997 shooting ===
In April 1997, Devon Dawson, a 29-year-old Jamaican in the UK with a six-month visa, was shot dead with a sub-machine gun outside the Green Man pub on Coldharbour Lane.

=== June 1997 shooting ===
On 3 June 1997, Anthony Baker was shot in the head during a raid at the Control Tower takeaway in Coldharbour Lane, Brixton, where he worked. The shooting happened just a few hundred yards from Lambeth Town Hall where, at the same time, Chief Inspector Alan O'Gorman was telling a packed meeting that gun crime in the area was becoming out of control.

=== 2003 most dangerous street claim ===
In a 2003 article in the London Evening Standard, David Cohen described Coldharbour Lane as the most dangerous street in the most dangerous borough in London. The headline asked whether the street is 'the most dangerous in Britain'.

=== 2018 graffiti artists hit by train ===
On 18 June 2018, three graffiti artists, aged between 19 and 23, died when they were hit by a train at Loughborough Junction station on Coldharbour Lane.

== Pubs and bars ==
There are several pubs and bars on Coldharbour Lane: the Prince of Wales in Brixton which has been on the same site since 1800; the Prince Albert which has occasional live music and quiz nights; the Dogstar, a "three-floor DJ bar"; Living; Club 414, and the Plough. The Green Man, the Angel, the Enterprise and the Hero (latterly the Junction) all ceased trading between 2000 and 2007 .

== In popular culture ==
Brixton-based band Alabama 3 named their debut album Exile on Coldharbour Lane after the road.

"Coldharbour Lane" is a single from The Quireboys's 2001 This Is Rock'n'Roll release.

Markus Schulz named his own recording label "Coldharbour Recordings" in honour of the time when he lived in a flat in Coldharbour Lane.

The area features in the 2008 novel The Room Of Lost Things by Stella Duffy, set in a dry cleaners on Coldharbour Lane.

Oladipo Agboluaje set a play referencing the street in 2007 "The Christ of Coldharbour Lane", about the sudden reappearance of Jesus Christ in Brixton.

Parts of Honeytrap, a 2015 film directed by Rebecca Johnson and starring Jessica Sula, were filmed on the street.

== The Camberwell beauty ==
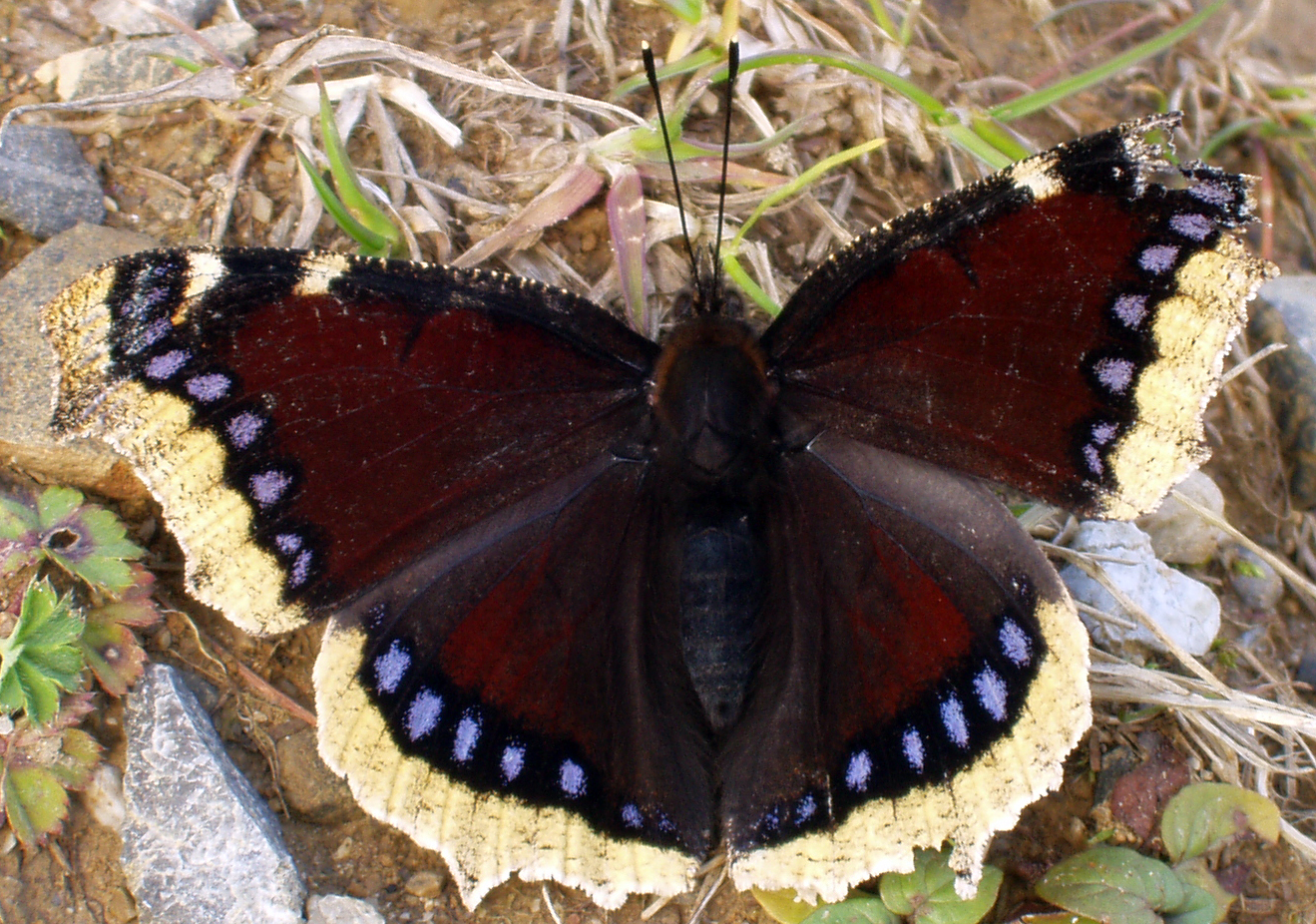
Camberwell beauty butterfly

The rare migrant butterfly, the Camberwell beauty (Nymphalis antiopa) was so named after the discovery of two specimens in Coldharbour Lane in 1748. The butterflies had probably arrived as stowaways on ships delivering timber from Scandinavia to the Surrey Docks two miles to the north.
