= Herne Hill (disambiguation) =

Herne Hill is a district in South London, England.

Herne Hill may also refer to:

- Herne Hill (ward), an electoral ward of Lambeth Borough Council, London
- Part of the A215 road leading down south to the neighbourhood of the same name in London
- Herne Hill railway station in South London
- Herne Hill, Victoria, Australia, a suburb of Geelong
- Herne Hill, Western Australia, a suburb of Perth

== See also ==
- Hernhill, a village in Kent, England
