= Herne Hill and Loughborough Junction =

Electoral ward in London, England

- Electoral ward for the Lambeth London Borough Council
- Herne Hill and Loughborough Junction ward boundaries since 2022
- Borough: Lambeth
- County: Greater London
- Population: 16,156 (2021) (Note: 2021 Census data reported for 2022 ward boundaries)
- Electorate: 11,294 (2022)
- Major settlements: Herne Hill and Loughborough Junction
- Area: 2.080 square kilometres (0.803 sq mi)

Current electoral ward
- Created: 2022
- Number of members: 3
- Councillors: Pauline George; Deepak Sardiwal; Paul Valentine
- Created from: Coldharbour and Herne Hill
- GSS code: E05014104

Herne Hill and Loughborough Junction is an electoral ward in the London Borough of Lambeth. The ward was first used in the 2022 elections. It returns three councillors to Lambeth London Borough Council.

== List of councillors ==
Term	Councillor	Party
2022–2025	Jim Dickson (Note: Jim Dickson and Pauline George were sitting councillors for the Herne Hill ward.)	Labour Co-op
2022–present	Pauline George	Labour Co-op
2022–present	Deepak Sardiwal	Labour Co-op
2025–present	Paul Valentine	Green

== Lambeth council elections ==
=== 2025 by-election ===
The by-election took place on 1 May 2025, following the resignation of Jim Dickson.

2025 Herne Hill and Loughborough Junction by-election
Party	Candidate	Votes	%	±%
Green	Paul Valentine	1,774	48.3	
Labour	Stephen Clark	1,459	38.7	
Conservative	Jago Brockway	183	5.0	
Reform	Lydia Aitcheson	135	3.7	
Liberal Democrats	Charley Hasted	121	3.3	
TUSC	Marco Tesei	30		
Socialist (GB)	Adam Buick	16		
Turnout				
Green gain from Labour		Swing		

=== 2022 election ===
The election took place on 5 May 2022.

2022 Lambeth London Borough Council election: Herne Hill and Loughborough Junction (3)
Party	Candidate	Votes	%	±%
Labour	Jim Dickson	2,429	52.9	
Labour	Pauline George	2,393	52.1	
Labour	Deepak Sardiwal	2,342	51.0	
Green	Celeste Hicks	1,838	40.0	
Green	Nick Christian	1,818	39.6	
Green	Paul Valentine	1,556	33.9	
Liberal Democrats	Rob Blackie	264	5.7	
Conservative	John White	253	5.5	
Conservative	Dick Tooze	251	5.5	
Conservative	Andrew Whitten	243	5.3	
Liberal Democrats	Charley Hasted	175	3.8	
Liberal Democrats	Jonathan Price	148	3.2	
TUSC	Berkay Kartav	71	1.5	
Turnout		4,670	41.3	
Labour win (new seat)				
Labour win (new seat)				
Labour win (new seat)				
