= Streatham Wells =

Electoral ward in the London Borough of Lambeth

Coordinates: 51.430°N 0.120°W

- Electoral ward for the Lambeth London Borough Council
- Borough: Lambeth
- County: Greater London
- Population: 9,879 (2021) (Note: 2021 Census data reported for 2022 ward boundaries)

Current electoral ward
- Created: 1965
- Members: 2 (2022-present); 3 (1965–2022)

Streatham Wells ward is an administrative division of the London Borough of Lambeth, United Kingdom. It contains part of Streatham town centre to the east of the A23 Streatham High Road. The population of the ward at the 2011 Census was 14,906.

Since the 2024 general election Streatham Wells ward has been within the Streatham and Croydon North Parliamentary constituency.

From the formation of the London Borough of Lambeth in 1965 to 1990, Streatham Wells elected Conservative councillors.

A single Liberal Democrat councillor was elected in 1990 alongside two Conservatives. From 1994 to 2010, the ward elected three Liberal Democrat councillors.

== Lambeth Council elections ==
=== 2022 election ===
The election took place on 5 May 2022.

2022 Lambeth London Borough Council election: Streatham Wells (2)
Party	Candidate	Votes	%	±%
Labour Co-op	Malcolm Clark *	1,102	49.1	
Labour Co-op	Marianna Masters *	1,101	49.0	
Liberal Democrats	Julian Heather	639	28.5	
Liberal Democrats	Eloka Ikegbunam	502	22.4	
Green	Clavia Chambers	365	16.3	
Green	Rachel Miller	309	13.8	
Conservative	Frazer Dennison	224	10.0	
Conservative	Wendy Newall	203	9.0	
TUSC	Candido Della Rocca	45	2.0	
Turnout		2,323	32.4	
Labour Co-op win (new boundaries)				
Labour Co-op win (new boundaries)				

=== 2018 election ===
The 2018 Lambeth council elections took place on Thursday May 3, 2018 with Labour retaining all 3 seats it gained in 2014.

2018 Lambeth London Borough Council election: Streatham Wells (3)
Party	Candidate	Votes	%	±%
Labour	Malcolm Clark*	2,151	49.8	▲6.1
Labour	Marianna Masters	2,065		
Labour	Mohammed Seedat*	1,975		
Liberal Democrats	Dominic Leigh	1,281	30.2	▼3.0
Liberal Democrats	Helen Thompson	1,261		
Liberal Democrats	Eloka Ikegbunam	1,216		
Green	Sheila Freeman	544	11.3	▲0.6
Green	Becca Deegan	532		
Green	Clifford Fleming	351		
Conservative	Lisabeth Liell	350	8.1	▲1.1
Conservative	Russell Henman	340		
Conservative	Teresa Tunstall	325		
Labour hold		Swing		
Labour hold		Swing		
Labour hold		Swing		

=== 2014 election ===
At the 2014 elections, residents of Streatham Wells elected three Labour Party Councillors, the first time that Labour had won the ward.

=== 2010 election ===
At the 2010 Lambeth Council elections, residents of Streatham Wells elected three Liberal Democrat councillors.
