= Thornton (ward) =

Electoral ward in the London borough of Lambeth

Coordinates: 51.445°N 0.136°W

- Former electoral ward for the Lambeth London Borough Council
- Borough: Lambeth
- County: Greater London

Former electoral ward
- Created: 1965
- Abolished: 2022
- Member: 3

Thornton ward was an administrative division of the London Borough of Lambeth, United Kingdom from 1965 to 2022.

The ward comprised the communities of Clapham Park and the Hyde Farm Estate. The ward shared the borough's western boundary with Wandsworth along Cavendish Road and Emmanuel Road alongside Tooting Bec Common. The south eastern boundary then continued along Emmanuel Road and New Park Road to the A205 South Circular Road. The boundaries of northern part of the ward followed the boundaries of the Clapham Park estate east of Kings Avenue and then cross to run down Clarence Avenue and Poynders Road.

The ward was located in the Streatham parliamentary constituency.

== 2002–2022 Lambeth council elections ==
=== April 2019 by-election ===
The by-election took place on 11 April 2019.

April 2019 Thornton by-election
Party	Candidate	Votes	%	±%
Labour	Nanda Manley-Browne	998	41	
Liberal Democrats	Mathew Bryant	979	41	
Green	Adrian John Audsley	171	7	
Conservative	Martin Lester Read	166	7	
Women's Equality	Leila Fazal	53	2	
UKIP	John Kenneth Plume	39	2	
Labour hold		Swing		

=== February 2019 by-election ===
The by-election took place on 7 February 2019, following the resignation of Lib Peck.

February 2019 Thornton by-election
Party	Candidate	Votes	%	±%
Labour	Stephen Donnelly	1,154	44.7	▼18.2
Liberal Democrats	Rebecca MacNair	845	32.8	▲23.1
Green	Adrian Audsley	251	9.7	▼1.7
Conservative	Martin Reid	247	9.6	▼6.4
Women's Equality	Leila Fazal	46	1.8	N/A
UKIP	John Plume	36	1.4	N/A
Majority		309	11.9	▼52.0
Turnout			27.5	
Labour hold		Swing		

=== 2018 election ===
The election took place on 3 May 2018.

2018 Lambeth London Borough Council election: Thornton (3)
Party	Candidate	Votes	%	±%
Labour	Lib Peck	2,140		
Labour	Jane Edbrooke	1,999		
Labour	Ed Davie	1,990		
Conservative	Martin Reid	645		
Conservative	Michael Spencer	511		
Conservative	Vernon de Maynard	489		
Green	Katherine Curran	388		
Green	Adrian Audsley	364		
Liberal Democrats	Duncan Brack	329		
Liberal Democrats	Rebecca MacNair	328		
Green	Anja Thies	292		
Liberal Democrats	Conor Doherty	235		
Labour hold		Swing		
Labour hold		Swing		
Labour hold		Swing		

Jane Edbrooke was previously an Oval ward councillor (2010–2018).

=== 2014 election ===
The election took place on 22 May 2014.

2014 Lambeth London Borough Council election: Thornton 2014 (3)
Party	Candidate	Votes	%	±%
Labour	Lib Peck	2,280		
Labour	Diana Morris	2,220		
Labour	Ed Davie	2,113		
UKIP	Bruce Machan	764		
Conservative	Simon Hemsley	664		
Conservative	Vernon de Maynard	570		
Conservative	Savill Young	481		
Green	Adrian Audsley	360		
Green	Hannah Kershaw	336		
Green	Charles Lankaster	272		
Liberal Democrats	Rebecca MacNair	271		
Liberal Democrats	Duncan Brack	258		
Liberal Democrats	John Pindar	227		
Total votes		10,816		
Labour hold		Swing		
Labour hold		Swing		
Labour hold		Swing		

=== 2010 election ===
The election on 6 May 2010 took place on the same day as the United Kingdom general election.

2010 Lambeth London Borough Council election: Thornton 2010 (3)
Party	Candidate	Votes	%	±%
Labour	Diana Morris	2,614		
Labour	Lib Peck	2,609		
Labour	Edward Davie	2,399		
Liberal Democrats	John Pindar	1,705		
Liberal Democrats	Christopher Keating	1,670		
Liberal Democrats	Andrew Waterman	1,383		
Conservative	Melanie Ball	1,188		
Conservative	Simon Hemsley	1,104		
Conservative	Vernon de Maynard	1,004		
Green	Adrian Audsley	504		
Green	Charles Gay	373		
Green	Helen Kersley	311		
Total votes		16,861		
Labour hold		Swing		
Labour hold		Swing		
Labour hold		Swing		

=== 2006 election ===
The election took place on 4 May 2006.

2006 Lambeth London Borough Council election: Thornton (3)
Party	Candidate	Votes	%	±%
Labour	Lib Peck	1,494		
Labour	Diana Morris	1,445		
Labour	Michael Hipwell	1,354		
Liberal Democrats	John Pindar	1,094		
Liberal Democrats	James Sparling	946		
Liberal Democrats	Suzanne Whitehead	925		
Conservative	Joy Jackson	480		
Green	Adrian Audsley	470		
Conservative	Vernon de Maynard	462		
Conservative	Philippa Stone	457		
Green	Charles Evans	372		
Green	Louise Wakefield	363		
Total votes		9,862		
Labour hold		Swing		
Labour gain from Liberal Democrats		Swing		
Labour gain from Liberal Democrats		Swing		

=== 2002 election ===
The election took place on 2 May 2002.

== 1978–2002 Lambeth council elections ==
=== 2001 by-election ===
The by-election took place on 7 June 2001.

=== 1998 election ===
The election took place on 7 May 1998.

1998 Lambeth London Borough Council election: Thornton (2)
Party	Candidate	Votes	%	±%
Labour	Anthony Hewitt	1,178		
Labour	Julie Minns	1,129		
Liberal Democrats	John Pindar	1,080		
Liberal Democrats	Robert Doyle	1,040		
Conservative	Claude Randall	170		
Conservative	Mark Kotecha	151		
Green	Lee Allane	122		
Turnout				
Labour gain from Liberal Democrats				
Labour gain from Liberal Democrats				

=== 1994 election ===
The election took place on 5 May 1994.

1994 Lambeth London Borough Council election: Thornton (2)
Party	Candidate	Votes	%	±%
Liberal Democrats	Maltby J. Pindar	1,244	39.26	▲33.40
Liberal Democrats	David C. Warner	1,204		
Labour	Rudolph A. Daley	1,065	33.26	▼9.14
Labour	Ty Goddard	1,009		
Conservative	Roger M. Bennett	718	22.00	▼21.62
Conservative	Oliver A.W. Lodge	653		
Independent	Ronald C. Bird	171	5.48	New
Registered electors		5,886		▲140
Turnout		3,202	54.40	▼0.93
Rejected ballots		8	0.25	▲0.09
Liberal Democrats gain from Independent				
Liberal Democrats gain from Labour				

=== 1990 election ===
The election took place on 3 May 1990.

1990 Lambeth London Borough Council election: Thornton (2)
Party	Candidate	Votes	%
Conservative	Ronald C. Bird	1,385	43.62
Labour	Rudolp A. Daley	1,360	42.40
Conservative	Roger M. Bennett	1,341	
Labour	David G. Davis	1,290	
Green	Susan P. Bradley	254	8.13
Liberal Democrats	Celia M. Thomas	194	5.86
Liberal Democrats	Arthur W.R. Capel	171	
Registered electors		5,746	
Turnout		3,179	55.33
Rejected ballots		5	0.16
Conservative hold			
Labour hold			

=== 1986 election ===
The election took place on 8 May 1986.

=== 1982 election ===
The election took place on 6 May 1982.

=== 1978 election ===
The election took place on 4 May 1978.

== 1964–1978 Lambeth council elections ==
=== 1974 election ===
The election took place on 2 May 1974.

=== 1971 election ===
The election took place on 13 May 1971.

=== 1968 election ===
The election took place on 9 May 1968.

1968 Lambeth London Borough Council election: Thornton
Party	Candidate	Votes	%	±%
Conservative	C. Brown	2,892		
Conservative	W. Fuller	2,874		
Conservative	G. Murray	1,214		
Labour	L. Drake	1172		
Labour	M. Noble	1159		
Labour	W. Seeley	1159		
Communist	J. Styles	143		
Turnout				
Conservative gain from Labour		Swing		
Conservative gain from Labour		Swing		
Conservative gain from Labour		Swing		

=== 1964 election ===
The election took place on 7 May 1964.

1964 Lambeth London Borough Council election: Thornton (3)
Party	Candidate	Votes	%	±%
Labour	L. Drake	2,135	49.6	
Labour	D. Speakman	2,124		
Labour	D. Stimpson	2,097		
Conservative	M. Tennant	1,870	43.5	
Conservative	J. Brown	1,854		
Conservative	J. Ebling	1,854		
Liberal	G. Gower	206	4.8	
Liberal	A. Monteath	200		
Liberal	J. Nicholson	200		
Communist	J. Styles	91	2.1	
Turnout		4,324	35.6	
Registered electors		12,159		
Labour win (new seat)				
Labour win (new seat)				
Labour win (new seat)				
