= Coldharbour (Lambeth ward) =

Coordinates: 51.463°N 0.109°W

- Former electoral ward for the Lambeth London Borough Council
- Coldharbour ward boundaries
- Borough: Lambeth
- County: Greater London
- Population: 16,784 (2011)
- Electorate: 12,165 (2018)
- Major settlements: Brixton
- Area: 1.2081 square kilometres (0.4665 sq mi)

Former electoral ward
- Created: 2002
- Abolished: 2022
- Member(s): 3
- Replaced by: Brixton Acre Lane; Brixton North; Brixton Rush Common; Brixton Windrush; Herne Hill and Loughborough Junction
- ONS code: 00AYGD
- GSS code: E05000420

Coldharbour was an electoral ward in the London Borough of Lambeth from 2002 to 2022. It covered parts of Brixton and Loughborough Junction. The ward was first used in the 2002 elections and last used at the 2018 elections. It returned three councillors to Lambeth London Borough Council. The ward was replaced in 2022 by Brixton Acre Lane, Brixton North, Brixton Rush Common, Brixton Windrush and Herne Hill and Loughborough Junction.

== List of councillors ==
Term	Councillor	Party
2002–2022	Donatus Anyanwu	Labour
2002–2006	Sharon Erdman	Labour
2002–2006	Sharon Ward	Labour
2006–2018	Rachel Heywood (Note: Rachel Heywood changed parties in 2016.)	Labour
2006–2018	Rachel Heywood	Independent
2006–2010	Sharon Malley	Labour
2010–2018	Matt Parr	Labour
2018–2022	Emma Nye (Note: Emma Nye has been a councillor for Knight's Hill ward since 2024.)	Labour
2018–2022	Scarlett O'Hara	Labour

== Lambeth council elections ==
=== 2018 by-election ===
The by-election took place on 13 September 2018, following the death of Matthew Parr.

2018 Coldharbour by-election
Party	Candidate	Votes	%	±%
Labour	Scarlett O'Hara	1,739	58.2	
Green	Michael Groce	912	30.5	
Liberal Democrats	Doug Buist	148	5.0	
Conservative	Yvonne Stewart-Williams	119	4.0	
Women's Equality	Sian Fogden	47	1.6	
UKIP	Robert Stephenson	21	0.7	
Majority		827		
Turnout		2,994	24.8	
Labour hold		Swing		

=== 2018 election ===
The election took place on 3 May 2018.

2018 Lambeth London Borough Council election: Coldharbour
Party	Candidate	Votes	%	±%
Labour Co-op	Emma Nye	2,325	66.0	
Labour Co-op	Donatus Anyanwu	2,257		
Labour Co-op	Matt Parr	1,975		
Green	Michael Groce	761	15.5	
Green	Rashid Nix	683		
Independent	Rachel Heywood	660	6.6	
Conservative	Michael Johnson	228	6.4	
Conservative	Amy Hennessy	217		
Conservative	Yvonne Stewart-Williams	189		
Liberal Democrats	Olivier Bertin	182	5.4	
Liberal Democrats	Henry McMorrow	180		
Liberal Democrats	Clive Lewis	173		
Turnout				
Labour hold		Swing		
Labour hold		Swing		
Labour hold		Swing		

=== 2014 election ===
The election took place on 22 May 2014.

2014 Lambeth London Borough Council election: Coldharbour
Party	Candidate	Votes	%	±%
Labour	Rachel Heywood	2,232	63.5	
Labour	Matt Parr	2,037		
Labour	Donatus Anyanwu	2,014		
Green	Solomon Smith	742	20.8	
Green	Thomas Wood	680		
Green	Rashid Nix	638		
Conservative	Yvonne Stewart-Williams	231	6.8	
Liberal Democrats	Rachel Lester	225	4.8	
Conservative	Carl Belgrove	224		
Conservative	Edward Watkins	221		
UKIP	Johan Ward	127	1.3	
Liberal Democrats	Michael Morfey	126		
Liberal Democrats	Simon Waddington	126		
Independent	David Warner	100	1.0	
Independent	Boniface Awogta	76	0.8	
Total votes				
Labour hold		Swing		
Labour hold		Swing		
Labour hold		Swing		

=== 2010 election ===
The election took place on 6 May 2010.

2010 Lambeth London Borough Council election: Coldharbour
Party	Candidate	Votes	%	±%
Labour	Rachel Heywood	3,983	64.5	
Labour	Donatus Anyanwu	3,819		
Labour	Matt Parr	3,681		
Liberal Democrats	Rachel Lester	1,091	16.8	
Liberal Democrats	Hilary Lavender	1,081		
Liberal Democrats	Angela Meader	808		
Green	Geoffrey Burgess	611	9.5	
Conservative	Thomas Baker	581	8.3	
Green	Olivier Bertin	573		
Green	Alexander James	511		
Conservative	Yvonne Stewart-Williams	458		
Conservative	Graham Pycock	430		
CPA	David Williams	169		
Total votes				
Labour hold		Swing		
Labour hold		Swing		
Labour hold		Swing		

=== 2006 election ===
The election took place on 4 May 2006.

2006 Lambeth London Borough Council election: Coldharbour
Party	Candidate	Votes	%	±%
Labour	Donatus Anyanwu	1,299	54.2	
Labour	Rachel Heywood	1,272		
Labour	Sharon Malley	1,187		
Green	Elkin Atwell	742	24.0	
Green	Rachel Braverman	471		
Green	Timothy Summers	450		
Liberal Democrats	Robert Blackie	304	11.5	
Liberal Democrats	Sandra Lawman	279		
Conservative	Simon Barrie	250	10.4	
Conservative	Smarajit Roy	242		
Conservative	Marcus Booth	227		
Liberal Democrats	Geoffrey Bowring	216		
Total votes		6,628		
Labour hold		Swing		
Labour hold		Swing		
Labour hold		Swing		

=== 2002 election ===
The election took place on 2 May 2002.

2002 Lambeth London Borough Council election: Coldharbour
Party	Candidate	Votes	%	±%
Labour	Donatus Anyanwu	989		
Labour	Sharon Erdman	949		
Labour	Sharon Ward	899		
Socialist Alliance	Theresa Bennett	252		
Green	William Collins	241		
Green	Paul Martin	219		
Green	Mohammed Sajid	217		
Liberal Democrats	Lindsay Avebury	215		
Liberal Democrats	Vivienne Baines	203		
Liberal Democrats	Malcolm Baines	181		
Conservative	Nicholas Brown	122		
Conservative	Glyn Chambers	108		
Conservative	John Lamont	105		
Independent	Robin Gibson	47		
Independent	Gary Bruton	43		
Independent	Darren Iliffe	40		
Turnout		4,680	17.1	
Labour win (new seat)				
Labour win (new seat)				
Labour win (new seat)				
