= Herne Hill (ward) =

Electoral ward in the London borough of Lambeth

Coordinates: 51.457°N 0.101°W

- Former electoral ward for the Lambeth London Borough Council
- Herne Hill ward boundaries from 2002 to 2022
- Borough: Lambeth
- County: Greater London
- Population: 15,107 (2011)
- Electorate: 11,754 (2018)
- Major settlements: Herne Hill
- Area: 203.04 square kilometres (78.39 sq mi)

Former electoral ward
- Created: 1965
- Abolished: 2022
- Member: 3
- Replaced by: Brixton Windrush; Herne Hill and Loughborough Junction
- GSS code: E05000423

Herne Hill was an electoral ward in the London Borough of Lambeth from 1965 to 2022. The ward was first used in the 1964 elections and last used for the 2018 elections. It returned three councillors to Lambeth London Borough Council. The boundaries were redrawn in 1978 and 2002. The ward was replaced in 2022 by Herne Hill and Loughborough Junction, with some streets going to Brixton Windrush.

== List of councillors ==
Term	Councillor	Party
1964–1968	H. De'Ath	Labour
1964–1968	J. Cloves	Labour
1964–1968	G. Culbard	Labour
1968–1971	L. Kennedy	Conservative
1968–1971	S. Davey	Conservative
1968–1971	C. Jones	Conservative
1971–1978	Lesley Hammond	Labour
1971–1974	P. Butler	Labour
1971–1974	T. Flynn	Labour
1974–1978	H. Griffiths	Labour
1974–1978	J. Boyle	Labour
1978–1986	Patricia Jenkyns	Conservative
1978–1982	William Bowring	Labour
1978–1982	Dennis Houghting	Labour
1982–1986	Lloyd Leon	Labour
1982–1986	Joan Walley	Labour
1986–1990	Andrew Carnegie	Labour
1986–1990	Frederick Taggart	Labour
1986–1990	Stephen Whaley	Labour
1990–2022	Jim Dickson	Labour
1990–1994	Amanda Waring	Labour
1990–1994	Stephen Whaley	Labour
1994–1998	Andrew Roe	Labour
1994–2006	Peter O'Connell	Labour
1998–2010	Kirsty McHugh	Labour
2006–2010; 2018–2022	Becca Thackray	Green
2010–2014	Carol Boucher	Labour
2010–2014	Leanne Targett-Parker	Labour
2014–2018	Michelle Agdomar	Labour
2014–2018	Jack Holborn	Labour
2018–2022	Pauline George	Labour

== Summary ==
Councillors elected by party at each general borough election.

- Labour
- Conservative
- Green

== 2002–2022 Lambeth council elections ==
There was a revision of ward boundaries in Lambeth in 2002. In the south of the ward the boundary moved from Effra Parade to Morval Road and Barnwell Road. In the north the ward was extended beyond the Brixton–Peckham railway line to take in King's College Hospital and the eastern part of the Loughborough Junction neighbourhood.

=== 2018 election ===
The election took place on 3 May 2018.

2018 Lambeth London Borough Council election: Herne Hill
Party	Candidate	Votes	%	±%
Green	Becca Thackray	2,365		
Labour	Jim Dickson	2,335		
Labour	Pauline George	2,246		
Labour	Jack Holborn	2,114		
Green	Nick Christian	2,060		
Green	Matt Reynolds	2,059		
Herne Hill CLC	Nicholas Edwards	705		
Conservative	Claire Baker	308		
Liberal Democrats	Poppy Hasted	274		
Liberal Democrats	Rachel Lester	266		
Conservative	Dick Tooze	263		
Conservative	Anton Richards	228		
Liberal Democrats	Luke Sandford	171		
Total votes				
Green gain from Labour		Swing		
Labour hold		Swing		
Labour hold		Swing		

=== 2014 election ===
The election took place on 22 May 2014.

2014 Lambeth London Borough Council election: Herne Hill
Party	Candidate	Votes	%	±%
Labour	Michelle Agdomar	2,420		
Labour	Jim Dickson	2,373		
Labour	Jack Holborn	2,198		
Green	Amelia Womack	1,357		
Green	Nicholas Edwards	1,269		
Green	Luke Hildyard	1,103		
Conservative	Claire Baker	470		
Conservative	Simon Hooberman	387		
Conservative	Heidi Nicholson	381		
Liberal Democrats	Jennifer Keen	351		
Liberal Democrats	Jonathan Price	241		
Liberal Democrats	Lawrence Price	187		
UKIP	Steven Stanbury	168		
TUSC	Louise Scott	121		
Total votes				
Labour hold		Swing		
Labour hold		Swing		
Labour hold		Swing		

=== 2010 election ===
The election on 6 May 2010 took place on the same day as the United Kingdom general election.

2010 Lambeth London Borough Council election: Herne Hill
Party	Candidate	Votes	%	±%
Labour	Jim Dickson	3,170		
Labour	Carol Boucher	3,057		
Labour	Leanne Targett-Parker	2,685		
Green	Louise Jordan	1,651		
Green	George Graham	1,599		
Green	William Hare	1,478		
Liberal Democrats	Martin Hoenle	1,147		
Liberal Democrats	Gail Price	1,127		
Conservative	Hamish Badenoch	1,047		
Conservative	Anna Box	1,021		
Liberal Democrats	Jonathan Price	904		
Conservative	Wendy Morton	862		
Total votes		19,748		
Labour hold		Swing		
Labour gain from Green		Swing		
Labour hold		Swing		

=== 2006 election ===
The election took place on 4 May 2006.

2006 Lambeth London Borough Council election: Herne Hill
Party	Candidate	Votes	%	±%
Green	Becca Thackray	1,359		
Labour	Kirsty McHugh	1,343		
Labour	Jim Dickson	1,314		
Green	Shane Collins	1,298		
Labour	Peter O'Connell	1,205		
Green	George Graham	1,151		
Conservative	Timothy Ayres	571		
Conservative	Charles Holroyd	562		
Conservative	Jessica Lee	497		
Liberal Democrats	Malgorzata Baker	371		
Liberal Democrats	Malcolm Baines	353		
Liberal Democrats	Charlotte Parry	341		
Total votes		10,365		
Green gain from Labour		Swing		
Labour hold		Swing		
Labour hold		Swing		

=== 2002 election ===
The election took place on 2 May 2002.

2002 Lambeth London Borough Council election: Herne Hill
Party	Candidate	Votes	%	±%
Labour	Jim Dickson	1,164		
Labour	Kirsty McHugh	1,160		
Labour	Peter O'Connell	898		
Green	Timothy Summers	709		
Liberal Democrats	Monica Armitage-Smith	511		
Liberal Democrats	Julia Goldsworthy	486		
Conservative	Anthony Jones	415		
Conservative	James Ford	407		
Conservative	Edna Richards	397		
Liberal Democrats	James Lundie	389		
Turnout		6,536	21.5	
Labour win (new boundaries)				
Labour win (new boundaries)				
Labour win (new boundaries)				

== 1978–2002 Lambeth council elections ==
Herne Hill ward boundaries from 1978 to 2002

There was a revision of ward boundaries in Lambeth in 1978. The boundary between the Tulse Hill and Herne Hill wards was realigned to bring all of Brixton Water Lane into Tulse Hill. The boundary was moved from Shakespeare Road to Effra Parade, bringing more streets in the Poet's Corner area into Herne Hill ward.

=== 1998 election ===
The election took place on 7 May 1998.

1998 Lambeth London Borough Council election: Herne Hill
Party	Candidate	Votes	%	±%
Labour	Jim Dickson	1,415		
Labour	Kirsty McHugh	1,359		
Labour	Peter Connell	1,170		
Conservative	Evan Davies	564		
Conservative	Lewis Robinson	500		
Liberal Democrats	Andrew Bennett	464		
Conservative	Shah Isfahan	459		
Green	Timothy Mather	387		
Liberal Democrats	Diane Grigsby	344		
Liberal Democrats	Dave Raval	276		
London Socialist	William Hynes	141		
Turnout				
Labour hold		Swing		
Labour hold		Swing		
Labour hold		Swing		

=== 1994 election ===
The election took place on 5 May 1994.

1994 Lambeth London Borough Council election: Herne Hill
Party	Candidate	Votes	%	±%
Labour	Jim Dickson	1,649		
Labour	Andrew Roe	1,534		
Labour	Peter O'Connell	1,500		
Conservative	Russell A'Court	1,227		
Conservative	Laurence Smith	1,156		
Conservative	Graham Pycock	1,150		
Liberal Democrats	Andrew Gifford	466		
Liberal Democrats	Emma Hewett	465		
Liberal Democrats	Andrew Truslove	381		
Green	Simon Grant	333		
Independent Democrat	Thomas Lackey	61		
Turnout				
Labour hold		Swing		
Labour hold		Swing		
Labour hold		Swing		

=== 1990 election ===
The election took place on 3 May 1990.

1990 Lambeth London Borough Council election: Herne Hill
Party	Candidate	Votes	%	±%
Labour	Amanda Waring	1,940		
Labour	Stephen Whaley	1,849		
Labour	Jim Dickson	1,822		
Conservative	Anthony Jones	1,332		
Conservative	Simon Williams	1,319		
Conservative	Anlhony Mathews	1,302		
Green	David Brett	571		
Liberal Democrats	Philip Heath	351		
Turnout				
Labour hold		Swing		
Labour hold		Swing		
Labour hold		Swing		

=== 1986 election ===
The election took place on 8 May 1986.

1986 Lambeth London Borough Council election: Herne Hill
Party	Candidate	Votes	%	±%
Labour	Andrew Carnegie	2,085		
Labour	Frederick Taggart	1,975		
Labour	Stephen Whaley	1,918		
Conservative	Patricia Jenkyns	1,493		
Conservative	Giles Bootheway	1,366		
Conservative	Sarah Norman	1,332		
Alliance	Derrick Accra	561		
Alliance	Christopher Roberson	552		
Alliance	Mohammed Memon	515		
Green	Catherine Mullan	181		
Turnout				
Labour gain from Conservative		Swing		
Labour hold		Swing		
Labour hold		Swing		

=== 1982 election ===
The election took place on 6 May 1982.

1982 Lambeth London Borough Council election: Herne Hill
Party	Candidate	Votes	%	±%
Conservative	Patricia Jenkyns	1,569		
Labour	Lloyd Leon	1,554		
Labour	Joan Walley	1,530		
Conservative	William Newton	1,528		
Labour	John Sharland	1,514		
Conservative	Gerald Hartup	1,513		
Alliance	Alexander Grey	868		
Alliance	Margaret Watkinson	862		
Alliance	John Moore	859		
Turnout				
Conservative hold		Swing		
Labour hold		Swing		
Labour hold		Swing		

=== 1978 election ===
The election took place on 4 May 1978.

1978 Lambeth London Borough Council election: Herne Hill
Party	Candidate	Votes	%	±%
Conservative	Patricia Jenkyns	1,793		
Labour	William Bowring	1,788		
Labour	Dennis Houghting	1,716		
Conservative	Clive Jones	1,700		
Labour	John Sharland	1,692		
Conservative	Teresa Snow	1,624		
Turnout				
Conservative win (new boundaries)				
Labour win (new boundaries)				
Labour win (new boundaries)				

== 1964–1978 Lambeth council elections ==
External image
- Herne Hill ward boundaries from 1965 to 1978

Herne Hill ward existed since the creation of the London Borough of Lambeth on 1 April 1965. For elections to the Greater London Council, the ward was part of the Lambeth electoral division from 1965 and then the Norwood division from 1973.

=== 1974 election ===
The election took place on 2 May 1974.

1974 Lambeth London Borough Council election: Herne Hill
Party	Candidate	Votes	%	±%
Labour	Lesley Hammond	1,418		
Labour	H. Griffiths	1,415		
Labour	J. Boyle	1,394		
Conservative	M. Malynn	1,226		
Conservative	B. Wallis	1,193		
Conservative	H. Shead	1,188		
Liberal	G. Culley	234		
Liberal	T. Hardy	204		
Turnout				
Labour hold		Swing		
Labour hold		Swing		
Labour hold		Swing		

=== 1971 election ===
The election took place on 13 May 1971.

1971 Lambeth London Borough Council election: Herne Hill
Party	Candidate	Votes	%	±%
Labour	Lesley Hammond	2,111		
Labour	P. Butler	2,069		
Labour	T. Flynn	2,058		
Conservative	C. Jones	1,662		
Conservative	L. Kennedy	1,657		
Conservative	F. Salter	1,648		
Turnout				
Labour gain from Conservative		Swing		
Labour gain from Conservative		Swing		
Labour gain from Conservative		Swing		

=== 1968 election ===
The election took place on 9 May 1968.

1968 Lambeth London Borough Council election: Herne Hill
Party	Candidate	Votes	%	±%
Conservative	L. Kennedy	2,390		
Conservative	S. Davey	2,369		
Conservative	C. Jones	2,358		
Labour	Lesley Hammond	871		
Labour	A. Wawman	849		
Labour	G. Culbard	836		
Turnout				
Conservative gain from Labour		Swing		
Conservative gain from Labour		Swing		
Conservative gain from Labour		Swing		

=== 1964 election ===
The election took place on 7 May 1964.

1964 Lambeth London Borough Council election: Herne Hill
Party	Candidate	Votes	%	±%
Labour	H. De'Ath	1,493	44.2	
Labour	J. Cloves	1,492		
Labour	G. Culbard	1,462		
Conservative	S. Davey	1,441	42.6	
Conservative	C. Jones	1,418		
Conservative	T. Prestage	1,395		
Liberal	Dennis Chapman	447	13.2	
Liberal	K. Daniells	410		
Liberal	T. Barker	384		
Turnout		3,367	30.8	
Registered electors		10,946		
Labour win (new seat)				
Labour win (new seat)				
Labour win (new seat)				
