= 2014 Lambeth London Borough Council election =

2014 Lambeth Council election
- 22 May 2014

All 63 council seats to Lambeth Council
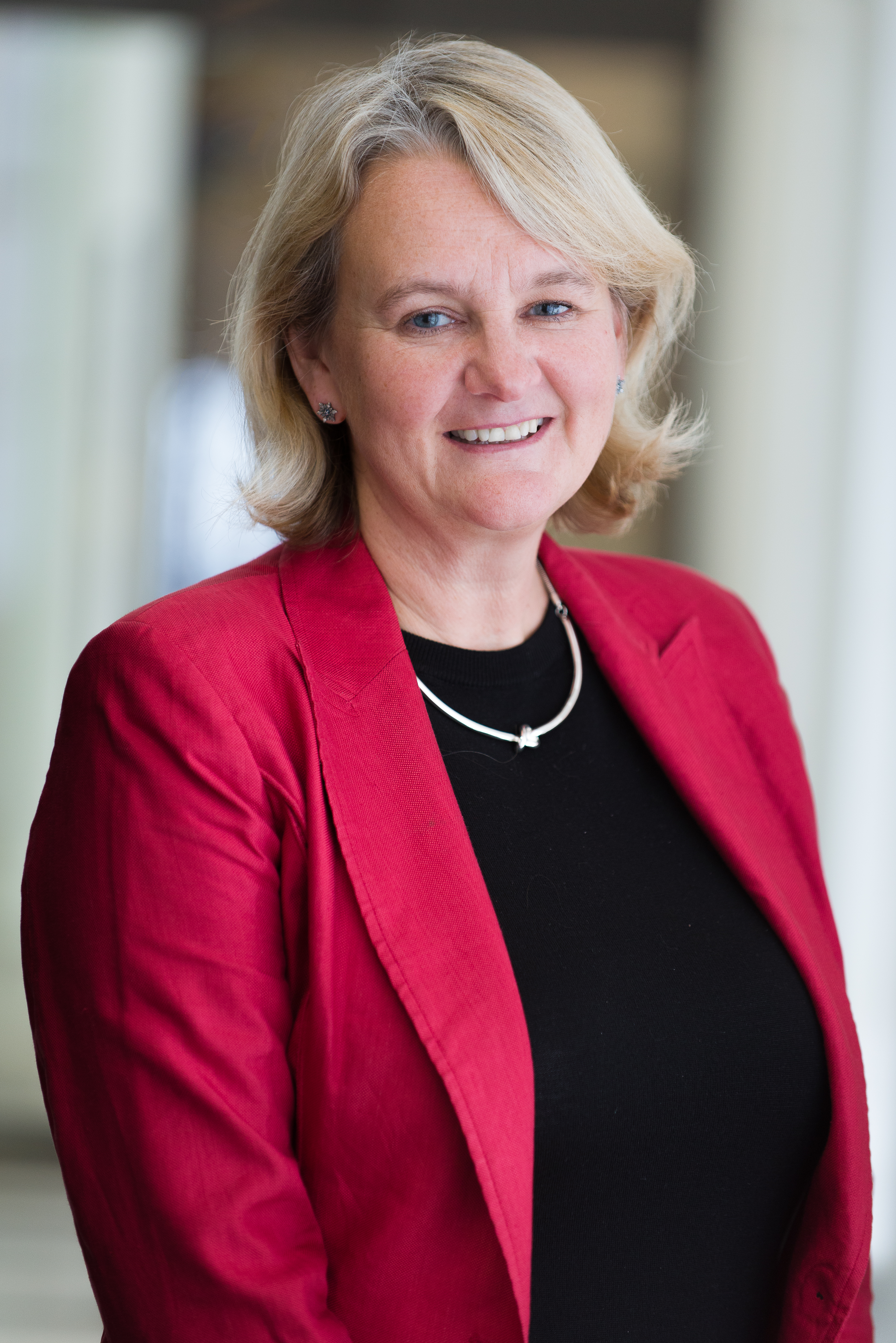

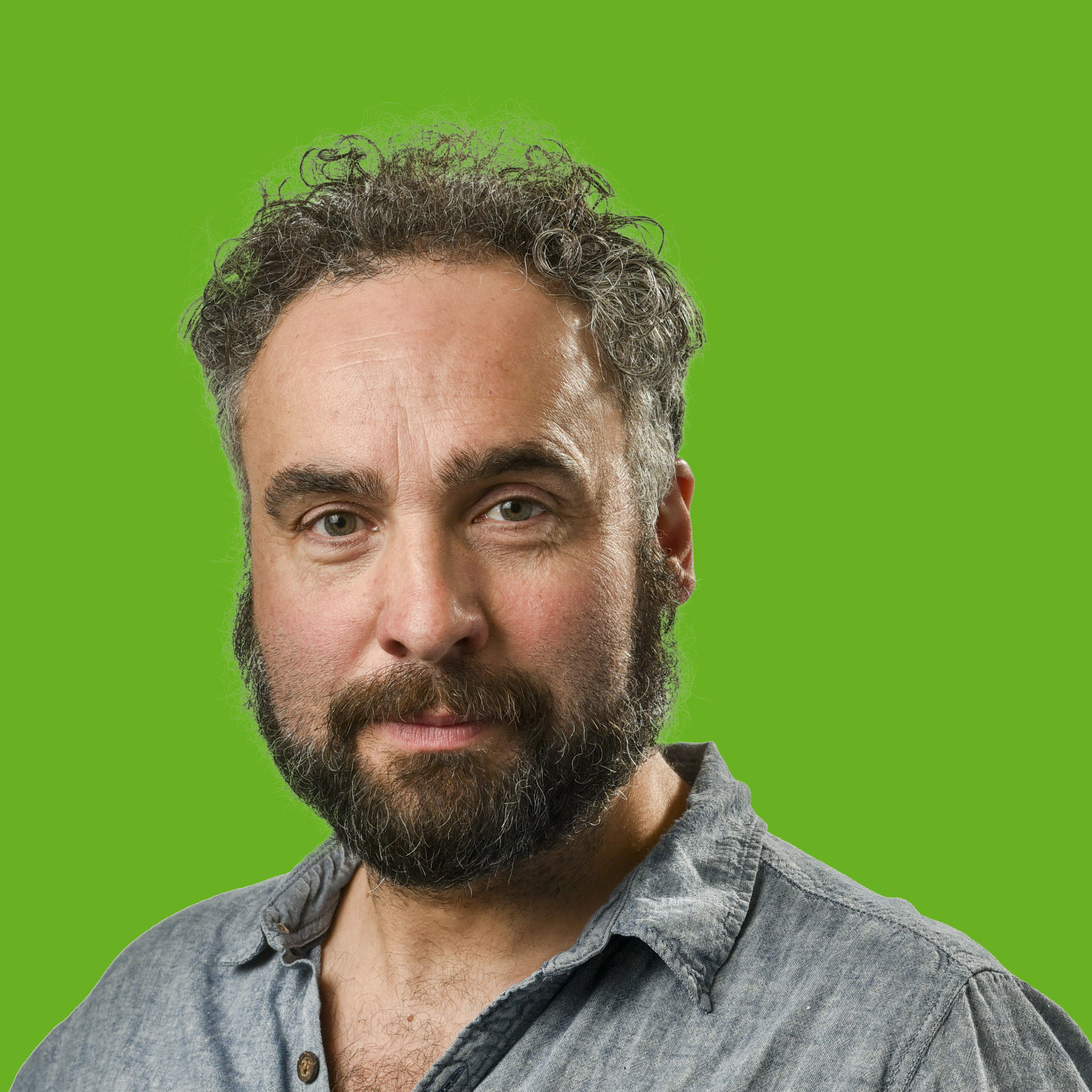
	First party	Second party
Leader	Lib Peck	Tim Briggs
Party	Labour	Conservative
Leader since	29 November 2012	2014
Leader's seat	Thornton	Clapham Common
Last election	44 seats, 41.8%	4 seats, 19.0%
Seats won	59	3
Seat change	▲15	▼1
Popular vote	40,572	11,871
Percentage	49.7%	14.5%
Swing	▲7.9%	▼4.5%
	Third party	Fourth party
Leader	Scott Ainslie	Alexander Davies
Party	Green	Liberal Democrats
Leader since	22 May 2014	5 March 2014
Leader's seat	St Leonard's	Streatham Wells (defeated)
Last election	0 seats, 10.1%	15 seats, 28.3%
Seats won	1	0
Seat change	▲1	▼15
Popular vote	12,620	10,456
Percentage	15.5%	12.8%
Swing	▲5.4%	▼15.5%
- Map of the results of the 2014 Lambeth council election. Conservatives in blue, Greens in green and Labour in red.
Leader of Largest Party before election
Lib Peck
Labour
Subsequent Leader of Largest Party
Lib Peck
Labour

The 2014 Lambeth Council election was held on 22 May 2014 to elect members of Lambeth Borough Council in Greater London, England. This was on the same day as other local elections. The election saw the Labour Party further increase its majority on the council, winning all but four of the 63 council seats.

Notably, the Liberal Democrats lost all 15 of their seats, but one of their seats in Bishop's ward was lost by under 35 votes.

The Liberal Democrats finished as the runners up in 4 wards, the Conservatives in 8, the Greens in 6, Labour in 2 and UKIP in 1.

== Results ==
Lambeth Council election result 2014
Party	Seats	Gains	Losses	Net gain/loss	Seats %	Votes %	Votes	+/−
Labour	59			+15	93.7	49.7	40,572	+7.9
Green	1			+1	1.6	15.5	12,620	+5.4
Conservative	3			−1	4.8	14.5	11,871	-4.5
Liberal Democrats	0			−15	0.0	12.8	10,456	-15.5
UKIP	0			±0	0.0	5.4	4,385	+5.3
TUSC	0			±0	0.0	1.3	1,080	New
Independent	0			±0	0.0	0.4	315	+0.1
Socialist (GB)	0			±0	0.0	0.2	176	+0.1
Pirate	0			±0	0.0	0.2	129	New

59	3	1
Labour	Con

== Results by ward ==
* - Existing Councillor seeking re-election.

=== Bishop's ===
Bishop's (3)
Party	Candidate	Votes	%	±%
Labour	Jennifer Moseley	1,106	39.5	+7.1
Labour	Kevin Craig	1,061	37.9	+6.7
Labour	Ben Kind	975	34.8	+8.3
Liberal Democrats	Diana Braithwaite*	949	33.9	−7.7
Liberal Democrats	Peter Truesdale*	939	33.5	−7.2
Liberal Democrats	Mathew Hanney	777	27.8	−9.0
Green	Sam Brightbart	304	10.9	+2.5
Green	Clive Croft	295	10.5	+3.4
Conservative	David Frost	292	10.4	−8.2
Conservative	Edward Harrison	291	10.4	−6.2
Conservative	Lee Rotherham	284	10.1	−6.0
Green	Bart Gorissen	272	9.7	+4.8
UKIP	Andrew Hayes	248	8.9	N/A
TUSC	El Morris	63	2.3	N/A
Turnout		2,800	36.9	
Labour gain from Liberal Democrats		Swing		
Labour gain from Liberal Democrats		Swing		
Labour gain from Liberal Democrats		Swing		

=== Brixton Hill ===
Brixton Hill (3)
Party	Candidate	Votes	%	±%
Labour	Adrian Garden	1,849	51.7	+9.7
Labour	Florence Eshalomi *	1,791	50.1	+10.5
Labour	Martin Tiedemann	1,560	43.6	+3.2
Green	Roger Baker	818	22.9	+6.3
Green	Andrew Child	768	21.5	+6.2
Green	Betty Mehari	719	20.1	+7.4
Conservative	James Calder	415	11.6	−1.5
Conservative	Charles Tankard	381	10.7	−0.8
Conservative	Michael Woolley	310	8.7	−1.6
UKIP	Paul Gregory	254	7.1	N/A
Liberal Democrats	Chris Keating	244	6.8	−24.6
Liberal Democrats	Liz Maffei	231	6.5	−21.5
Liberal Democrats	Adam Pritchard	228	6.4	−16.9
TUSC	Lisa Bainbridge	132	3.7	N/A
TUSC	Alex Richardson	83	2.3	N/A
TUSC	Jessica Walters	74	2.1	N/A
Turnout		3,577	31.4	
Labour hold		Swing		
Labour hold		Swing		
Labour hold		Swing		

=== Clapham Common ===
Clapham Common (3)
Party	Candidate	Votes	%	±%
Conservative	Timothy Briggs	1,386	47.3	+13.0
Conservative	Louise Nathanson	1,154	39.3	+7.4
Conservative	Bernard Gentry	1,148	39.1	+8.7
Labour	Tim Goodwin	1,020	34.8	+6.6
Labour	Nichola Hartwell	955	32.6	+5.7
Labour	Jack Pascoe	943	32.2	+9.0
Green	Hannah Cutler	433	14.8	+6.5
Green	Peter Kelly	372	12.7	+5.4
Liberal Democrats	Matthew Bryant	268	9.1	−26.7
Green	Shash Selander	268	9.1	+4.7
Liberal Democrats	Simon Drage	247	8.4	−18.0
Liberal Democrats	Ruhi Hayat-Khan	229	7.8	−18.2
UKIP	Anne Marie Waters	216	7.4	N/A
Turnout		2,933	29.8	
Conservative gain from Liberal Democrats		Swing		
Conservative hold		Swing		
Conservative hold		Swing		

=== Clapham Town ===
Clapham Town (3)
Party	Candidate	Votes	%	±%
Labour	Linda Bray	1,930	53.2	+10.9
Labour	Christopher Wellbelove *	1,853	51.0	+12.9
Labour	Nigel Haselden *	1,842	50.7	+8.0
Conservative	Hannah Ginnett	973	26.8	−5.3
Conservative	Sebastian Lowe	944	26.0	−5.2
Conservative	Gareth Wallace	848	23.4	−5.1
Green	Marion Prideaux	427	11.8	+3.9
Green	Julian Hall	423	11.6	+5.2
Green	Gerard Keenan	355	9.8	+6.2
Liberal Democrats	Olly Grender	253	7.0	−10.3
UKIP	Cameron Murdoch	191	5.3	N/A
Liberal Democrats	Colin Penning	142	3.9	−12.8
Liberal Democrats	Jack Williams	122	3.4	−12.0
Socialist (GB)	Oliver Bond	46	1.3	N/A
Turnout		3,631	33.7	
Labour hold		Swing		
Labour hold		Swing		
Labour hold		Swing		

=== Coldharbour ===
Coldharbour (3)
Party	Candidate	Votes	%	±%
Labour	Rachel Heywood *	2,232	63.5	−0.9
Labour	Matt Parr *	2,037	58.0	−1.5
Labour	Donatus Anyanwu *	2,014	57.3	−4.4
Green	Solomon Smith	742	21.1	+11.2
Green	Thomas Wood	680	19.4	+10.1
Green	Rashid Nix	638	18.2	+9.9
Conservative	Yvonne Stewart-Williams	398	11.3	+3.9
Liberal Democrats	Rachel Lester	225	6.4	−11.2
Conservative	Carl Belgrove	224	6.4	−3.0
Conservative	Edward Watkins	221	6.3	−0.7
UKIP	Johan Ward	127	3.6	N/A
Liberal Democrats	Michael Morfey	126	3.6	−13.9
Liberal Democrats	Simon Waddington	126	3.6	−9.5
Independent	David Warner	100	2.8	N/A
Independent	Boniface Awogta	76	2.2	N/A
Turnout		3,514	30.7	
Labour hold		Swing		
Labour hold		Swing		
Labour hold		Swing		

- Rachel Heywood was elected as a Labour Councillor. Heywood resigned the party whip in April 2016 and now sits as an independent councillor.

=== Ferndale ===
Ferndale (3)
Party	Candidate	Votes	%	±%
Labour	Sally Prentice *	1,762	56.4	+11.2
Labour	Paul McGlone *	1,696	54.3	+8.1
Labour	Neil Sabharwal *	1,499	48.0	+8.2
Green	Edward Gillespie	625	20.0	+9.4
Green	Philip Woolley	619	19.8	+9.5
Conservative	Thomas Hatton	493	15.8	−4.3
Conservative	Paul Mawdsley	444	14.2	−3.4
Conservative	Michael Timmins	431	13.8	−3.8
Liberal Democrats	Jane Vaus	256	8.2	−14.9
Liberal Democrats	Michael Tuffrey	221	7.1	−15.8
Liberal Democrats	John Medway	211	6.8	−15.3
UKIP	Elizabeth Erwin Jones	196	6.3	N/A
TUSC	James Ivens	113	3.6	N/A
Socialist (GB)	Daniel Lambert	81	2.6	+1.2
Turnout		3,125	27.5	
Labour hold		Swing		
Labour hold		Swing		
Labour hold		Swing		

=== Gipsy Hill ===
Gipsy Hill (3)
Party	Candidate	Votes	%	±%
Labour	Matthew Bennett *	2,242	59.0	+13.7
Labour	Niranjan Francis *	2,202	57.9	+13.8
Labour	Jennifer Braithwaite *	2,183	57.4	+13.5
Conservative	Tom Martin	436	11.5	−16.6
Conservative	Ali Kayikkiran	434	11.4	−15.9
Conservative	Said Gutin	423	11.1	−15.8
Green	Ben McKeown	364	9.6	+1.8
Green	Cath Potter	317	8.3	+2.4
Green	Paul Wynter	257	6.8	+1.2
Liberal Democrats	David Hare	164	4.3	−13.6
Liberal Democrats	Marietta Crichton-Stuart	161	4.2	−13.0
UKIP	Eddie Otoyo	142	3.7	N/A
Liberal Democrats	Marcus van Breugel	133	3.5	−11.0
Turnout		3,801	37.6	
Labour hold		Swing		
Labour hold		Swing		
Labour hold		Swing		

=== Herne Hill ===
Herne Hill (3)
Party	Candidate	Votes	%	±%
Labour	Michelle Agdomar	2,420	53.0	+8.7
Labour	Jim Dickson *	2,373	52.0	+6.0
Labour	Jack Holborn	2,198	48.1	+9.2
Green	Amelia Womack	1,357	29.7	+5.8
Green	Nicholas Edwards	1,269	27.8	+4.6
Green	Luke Hildyard	1,103	24.2	+2.8
Conservative	Claire Baker	470	10.3	−4.9
Conservative	Simon Hooberman	387	8.5	−6.3
Conservative	Heidi Nicholson	381	8.3	−4.2
Liberal Democrats	Jennifer Keen	351	7.7	−8.9
Liberal Democrats	Jonathan Price	241	5.3	−7.8
Liberal Democrats	Lawrence Price	187	4.1	−12.2
UKIP	Steven Stanbury	168	3.7	N/A
TUSC	Louise Scott	121	2.6	N/A
Turnout		4,567	40.6	
Labour hold		Swing		
Labour hold		Swing		
Labour hold		Swing		

=== Knight's Hill ===
Knight's Hill (3)
Party	Candidate	Votes	%	±%
Labour	Jackie Meldrum *	2,182	64.0	+11.8
Labour	Jane Pickard *	2,169	63.6	+13.8
Labour	Sonia Winifred	1,911	56.0	+8.4
Conservative	Julia Belgrove	468	13.7	−2.5
Green	Nicholas Giannissis	457	13.4	+7.3
Conservative	Tim Collins	442	13.0	−2.9
Green	Lianna Etkind	388	11.4	+4.2
Conservative	Tony Kimm	382	11.2	−2.7
Green	Hugo Estevez	365	10.7	+4.2
Liberal Democrats	Robert Hardware	256	7.5	−17.9
UKIP	Helena Kowalska	249	7.3	N/A
Liberal Democrats	Libby Calton	238	7.0	−17.6
Liberal Democrats	Julian Heather	202	5.9	−18.4
Turnout		3,410	33.8	
Labour hold		Swing		
Labour hold		Swing		
Labour hold		Swing		

=== Larkhall ===
Larkhall (3)
Party	Candidate	Votes	%	±%
Labour	Marsha de Cordova	1,809	54.3	+9.6
Labour	Christiana Valcarcel *	1,651	49.6	+10.4
Labour	Andy Wilson	1,503	45.1	+3.9
Conservative	Victoria Lowe	651	19.5	−2.1
Conservative	Matthew Jupp	570	17.1	−4.5
Green	Lisa Perry	546	16.4	+5.2
Conservative	Alison Trelawny	517	15.5	−4.6
Green	Joe Dalton	492	14.8	+3.5
Green	Ciaran Osborne	431	12.9	+6.1
Liberal Democrats	Claire Church	329	9.9	−15.8
Liberal Democrats	Alistair Mills	271	8.1	−14.1
Liberal Democrats	Alistair MacDonald	216	6.5	−12.8
UKIP	Sean Marriott	210	6.3	N/A
TUSC	Alexander Betteridge	100	3.0	N/A
Socialist (GB)	Adam Buick	49	1.5	+0.7
Turnout		3,331	27.0	
Labour hold		Swing		
Labour hold		Swing		
Labour hold		Swing		

=== Oval ===
Oval (3)
Party	Candidate	Votes	%	±%
Labour	Claire Holland	2,105	51.0	+13.7
Labour	Jack Hopkins *	2,081	50.4	+13.6
Labour	Jane Edbrooke	2,013	48.7	+16.1
Liberal Democrats	Ishbel Brown *	903	21.9	−13.8
Liberal Democrats	Helen Monger	769	18.6	−15.3
Liberal Democrats	George Turner	579	14.0	−19.1
Green	Anna Geffert	570	13.8	+2.8
Conservative	Stephen Humphreys	538	13.0	−4.7
Conservative	Glencora Senior	512	12.4	−3.2
Green	Sandra Young	478	11.6	+4.7
Conservative	Pawan Sharma	444	10.7	−3.4
Green	Bernard O'Sullivan	432	10.5	+5.1
UKIP	Lucia Otoyo	322	7.8	N/A
TUSC	Steve Nally	102	2.5	N/A
Turnout		4,131	38.2	
Labour hold		Swing		
Labour hold		Swing		
Labour gain from Liberal Democrats		Swing		

=== Prince's ===
Prince's (3)
Party	Candidate	Votes	%	±%
Labour	David Amos*	2,342	55.6	+9.9
Labour	Chris Marsh	2,160	51.3	+6.3
Labour	Joanne Simpson	2,058	48.9	+6.3
Conservative	Claire Barker	761	18.1	+1.2
Conservative	James Bellis	705	16.7	−1.9
Conservative	Michael Poole-Wilson	606	14.4	−3.0
Green	Eleanor Halsall	548	13.0	+2.7
Green	Joe Taylor	479	11.4	+5.3
Liberal Democrats	Vivienne Baines	441	10.5	−11.5
Green	Fern Lindsay	428	10.2	+4.8
Liberal Democrats	Malcolm Baines	401	9.5	−12.1
Liberal Democrats	Daisy Christodoulou	360	8.6	−11.4
UKIP	John Dodds	334	7.9	+5.7
Independent	John Howard	170	4.0	N/A
TUSC	Laurence Hutchinson	95	2.3	N/A
Turnout		4,209	37.7	
Labour hold		Swing		
Labour hold		Swing		
Labour hold		Swing		

=== St Leonard's ===
St Leonard's (3)
Party	Candidate	Votes	%	±%
Labour	Robert Hill	1,218	33.0	−0.4
Green	Scott Ainslie	1,161	31.5	+21.2
Labour	Saleha Jaffer	1,158	31.4	−1.2
Labour	Michael Burke	1,125	30.5	+1.6
Green	Jonathan Bartley	1,102	29.9	+24.3
Green	Rachel Laurence	921	25.0	+20.1
Liberal Democrats	Brian Palmer *	913	24.7	−13.1
Liberal Democrats	Roger Geiss *	738	20.0	−14.8
Liberal Democrats	Phillip Stanmer	695	18.8	−25.4
Conservative	Felicity Newall	432	11.7	−7.1
Conservative	Charles Jarrett	415	11.2	−5.0
Conservative	Wendy Newall	395	10.7	−6.0
UKIP	Mark Trasenster	236	6.4	N/A
Turnout		3,690	34.7	
Labour gain from Liberal Democrats		Swing		
Green gain from Liberal Democrats		Swing		
Labour gain from Liberal Democrats		Swing		

=== Stockwell ===
Stockwell (3)
Party	Candidate	Votes	%	±%
Labour	Alex Bigham	2,026	57.4	+11.8
Labour	Imogen Walker *	1,778	50.4	+6.2
Labour	Guilherme Rosa	1,769	50.1	+1.8
Conservative	Sarah Barr	608	17.2	+0.3
Liberal Democrats	Anthony Bottrall	552	15.6	−16.0
Conservative	Craig Barrett	507	14.4	+0.9
Green	Sam Low	502	14.2	+6.5
Green	Maritza Tschepp	431	12.2	+5.8
Conservative	Robert McMillan	430	12.2	−0.5
Liberal Democrats	Matthew McConnell	416	11.8	−13.4
Liberal Democrats	Fernanda Correia-Sefzick	380	10.8	−20.8
Green	David Ville	366	10.4	+4.8
TUSC	Joana Santos	136	3.9	N/A
Turnout		3,530	32.6	
Labour hold		Swing		
Labour hold		Swing		
Labour hold		Swing		

=== Streatham Hill ===
Streatham Hill (3)
Party	Candidate	Votes	%	±%
Labour	Liz Atkins	1,736	44.8	+12.5
Labour	Rezina Chowdhury	1,582	40.8	+9.2
Labour	Iain Simpson	1,448	37.3	+5.9
Liberal Democrats	Jeremy Clyne *	1,272	32.8	−6.7
Liberal Democrats	Ashley Lumsden *	1,234	31.8	−7.3
Liberal Democrats	Kita Ogden *	1,100	28.4	−7.1
Green	David Bryant	515	13.3	+4.2
Conservative	Elaine Bailey	422	10.9	−5.3
Green	Leon Maurice-Jones	414	10.7	+2.1
Green	James Caspell	411	10.6	+3.2
Conservative	Mark Wallace	347	8.9	−3.9
Conservative	Philip Henwood	317	8.2	−5.6
UKIP	Peter Younghusband	222	5.7	−7.1
Independent	Kriss Harris	45	1.2	N/A
Turnout		3,878	36.4	
Labour gain from Liberal Democrats		Swing		
Labour gain from Liberal Democrats		Swing		
Labour gain from Liberal Democrats		Swing		

=== Streatham South ===
Streatham South (3)
Party	Candidate	Votes	%	±%
Labour	John Kazantzis *	2,050	60.1	+13.7
Labour	Danial Adilypour	1,992	58.4	+9.5
Labour	Clair Wilcox	1,986	58.2	+9.3
Conservative	Helen Smith	597	17.5	+1.5
Conservative	Jonathan Guinness	540	15.8	+1.4
Conservative	Jack Wharton	495	14.5	+0.6
Green	Emma Hinkson	408	12.0	+7.8
Liberal Democrats	Karen Morfey	301	8.8	−20.0
Green	Benjamin Spencer	291	8.5	+4.1
Liberal Democrats	Nazir Ahmed	275	8.1	−18.5
Liberal Democrats	Ahmad Ali	274	8.0	−21.2
Green	Nigel Melia	262	7.7	+3.4
Turnout		3,411	34.1	
Labour hold		Swing		
Labour hold		Swing		
Labour hold		Swing		

=== Streatham Wells ===
Streatham Wells (3)
Party	Candidate	Votes	%	±%
Labour	Malcolm Clark	1,916	45.4	+10.1
Labour	Mohammed Seedat	1,676	39.7	+4.5
Labour	Amelie Treppass	1,658	39.3	+7.2
Liberal Democrats	Judith Best *	1,458	34.5	−7.9
Liberal Democrats	Alexander Davies *	1,354	32.1	−9.2
Liberal Democrats	Daphne Marchant *	936	22.2	−17.4
Green	Rachel Braverman	470	11.1	+4.7
Green	Sheila Freeman	429	10.2	+3.6
Green	Magda Devas	373	8.8	+2.9
Conservative	Stanley Davies	314	7.4	−7.2
Conservative	Lisabeth Liell	279	6.6	−6.5
Conservative	Teresa Tunstall	250	5.9	−7.2
UKIP	Simon Harman	231	5.5	N/A
Turnout		4,220	39.4	
Labour gain from Liberal Democrats		Swing		
Labour gain from Liberal Democrats		Swing		
Labour gain from Liberal Democrats		Swing		

=== Thornton ===
Thornton (3)
Party	Candidate	Votes	%	±%
Labour	Lib Peck *	2,280	52.9	+9.1
Labour	Diana Morris *	2,220	51.5	+7.6
Labour	Edward Davie *	2,113	49.0	+8.7
UKIP	Bruce Machan	764	17.7	N/A
Conservative	Simon Helmsley	664	15.4	−3.1
Conservative	Vernon de Maynard	570	13.2	−3.7
Conservative	Savill Young	481	11.2	−8.8
Green	Adrian Audsley	360	8.4	−0.1
Green	Hannah Kershaw	336	7.8	+1.5
Green	Charles Lankaster	272	6.3	+1.1
Liberal Democrats	Rebecca MacNair	271	6.3	−21.8
Liberal Democrats	Duncan Brack	258	6.0	−17.2
Liberal Democrats	John Pindar	227	5.3	−23.3
Turnout		4,309	43.3	
Labour hold		Swing		
Labour hold		Swing		
Labour hold		Swing		

=== Thurlow Park ===
Thurlow Park (3)
Party	Candidate	Votes	%	±%
Labour	Anna Birley	2,312	53.7	+21.8
Labour	Fred Cowell	2,122	49.2	+18.7
Labour	Max Dowber	1,931	44.8	+15.2
Conservative	Irene Kimm	1,187	27.5	−2.4
Conservative	Luke Tryl	1,097	25.5	−12.9
Conservative	Graham Pycock	1,020	23.6	−8.1
Green	Matt Farrow	673	15.6	+3.4
Green	Pat Price-Tomes	544	12.6	+3.1
Green	Jo Stone-Fewings	540	12.5	+3.2
Liberal Democrats	Andrew Thurburn	279	6.5	−16.2
UKIP	Robin Lambert	277	6.4	+3.6
Liberal Democrats	Malgorzata Baker	259	6.0	−17.7
Liberal Democrats	Jeremy Baker	254	5.9	−16.8
Turnout		4,309	39.0	
Labour gain from Conservative		Swing		
Labour hold		Swing		
Labour gain from Conservative		Swing		

=== Tulse Hill ===
Tulse Hill (3)
Party	Candidate	Votes	%	±%
Labour	Mary Atkins	2,276	62.5	+13.0
Labour	Adedamola Aminu *	2,073	57.0	+8.2
Labour	Mayor Cameron	2,044	56.2	+7.8
Green	Elkin Atwell	742	20.4	+8.8
Green	Jonathan Chuter	713	19.6	+8.9
Green	Will Wynter	615	16.9	+6.9
Conservative	Lavinia Cartwright	305	8.4	−0.9
Liberal Democrats	Matthew Coldrick	266	7.3	−19.7
Conservative	John White	256	7.0	−1.5
Conservative	Martin Read	250	6.9	−0.8
Liberal Democrats	Terry Curtis	242	6.7	−20.1
Liberal Democrats	John Foster	185	5.1	−20.4
TUSC	Kieran O'Mant	105	2.9	N/A
TUSC	Marcel Richards	78	2.1	N/A
Turnout		3,639	32.3	
Labour hold		Swing		
Labour hold		Swing		
Labour hold		Swing		

=== Vassall ===
Vassall (3)
Party	Candidate	Votes	%	±%
Labour	Jacqui Dyer	1,751	53.2	+8.7
Labour	Paul Gadsby *	1,723	52.3	+11.7
Labour	Annie Gallop	1,671	50.7	+13.0
Green	Celia Cole	598	18.2	+8.7
Conservative	Paul Abbott	463	14.1	+3.7
Conservative	Stuart Barr	451	13.7	+1.3
Green	Owen Everett	451	13.7	+5.3
Liberal Democrats	Lindsay Avebury	445	13.5	−25.1
Green	John Walton	419	12.7	+4.3
Liberal Democrats	Collette Thomas	388	11.8	−19.7
Conservative	Joshua Gething	382	11.6	+2.4
Liberal Democrats	Dominic Wyard	254	7.7	−20.7
Pirate	Mark Chapman	129	3.9	N/A
TUSC	Dalton Montague	113	3.4	N/A
Turnout		3,293	31.1	
Labour hold		Swing		
Labour gain from Liberal Democrats		Swing		
Labour hold		Swing		

== By-elections: 2014–2018 ==
=== Knight's Hill ===
Knight's Hill by-election, 14 August 2014
Party	Candidate	Votes	%	±%
Labour	Sonia Winifred	1,265	63.7	▼2.3
Conservative	Heidi Nicholson	248	12.5	▲0.4
Green	Christopher Hocknell	230	11.6	▲1.1
UKIP	Robin Lambert	99	5.0	▲1.9
Liberal Democrats	Robert Hardware	94	4.7	▼2.4
Independent	Nelly Amos	51	2.6	N/A
Majority		1,017	51.2	
Turnout		1,987		
Labour hold		Swing		

The by-election was triggered when the incumbent Councillor, Sonia Winifred, was disqualified as she was still employed by the council at the time of the previous election. Winifred was re-elected.

Prince's by-election, 7 May 2015
Party	Candidate	Votes	%	±%
Labour	Valia McClure	3,452	44.5	
Liberal Democrats	Adrian Hyyrylainen-Trett	1,748	22.5	
Conservative	Gareth Wallace	1,518	16.6	
Green	Marie James	901	11.6	
TUSC	Kingsley Abrahams	99	0.1	
Socialist (GB)	Danny Lambert	42	0.1	N/A
Majority		1,704		
Turnout		7,760		
Labour hold		Swing		

Gipsy Hill by-election, 9 June 2016
Party	Candidate	Votes	%	±%
Labour	Luke Murphy	1,220	43.4	▼26.9
Green	Pete Elliott	1,184	42.1	▲31.2
Conservative	Leslie Maruziva	210	7.5	▼7.0
Liberal Democrats	Rosa Jesse	84	3.0	▼2.8
UKIP	Elizabeth Jones	73	2.6	▼0.7
Independent	Robin Lambert	24	0.9	▲0.9
TUSC	Steven Nally	19	0.7	▲0.7
Majority		36	1.3	▼29.2
Turnout				
Labour hold		Swing		

The by-election was held following death of the incumbent Councillor. It was subsequently retained by Labour with a significantly reduced majority.

== EU referendum 2016 ==
During the 2016 United Kingdom European Union membership referendum Lambeth voted 78% to remain in the EU and 22% to leave. Two of the three Labour MPs backed Remain, Chuka Umunna and Helen Hayes, whereas Vauxhall MP Kate Hoey backed Leave.
