= Loughborough Junction =

Area of Herne Hill, London, England

Coordinates: 51.4661°N 0.102°W

- Location within Greater London
- London borough: Lambeth
- Ceremonial county: Greater London
- Region: London
- Country: England
- Sovereign state: United Kingdom
- Post town: LONDON
- Postcode district: SW9
- Postcode district: SE5
- Dialling code: 020
- Police: Metropolitan
- Fire: London
- Ambulance: London
- UK Parliament: Dulwich and West Norwood
- London Assembly: Lambeth and Southwark

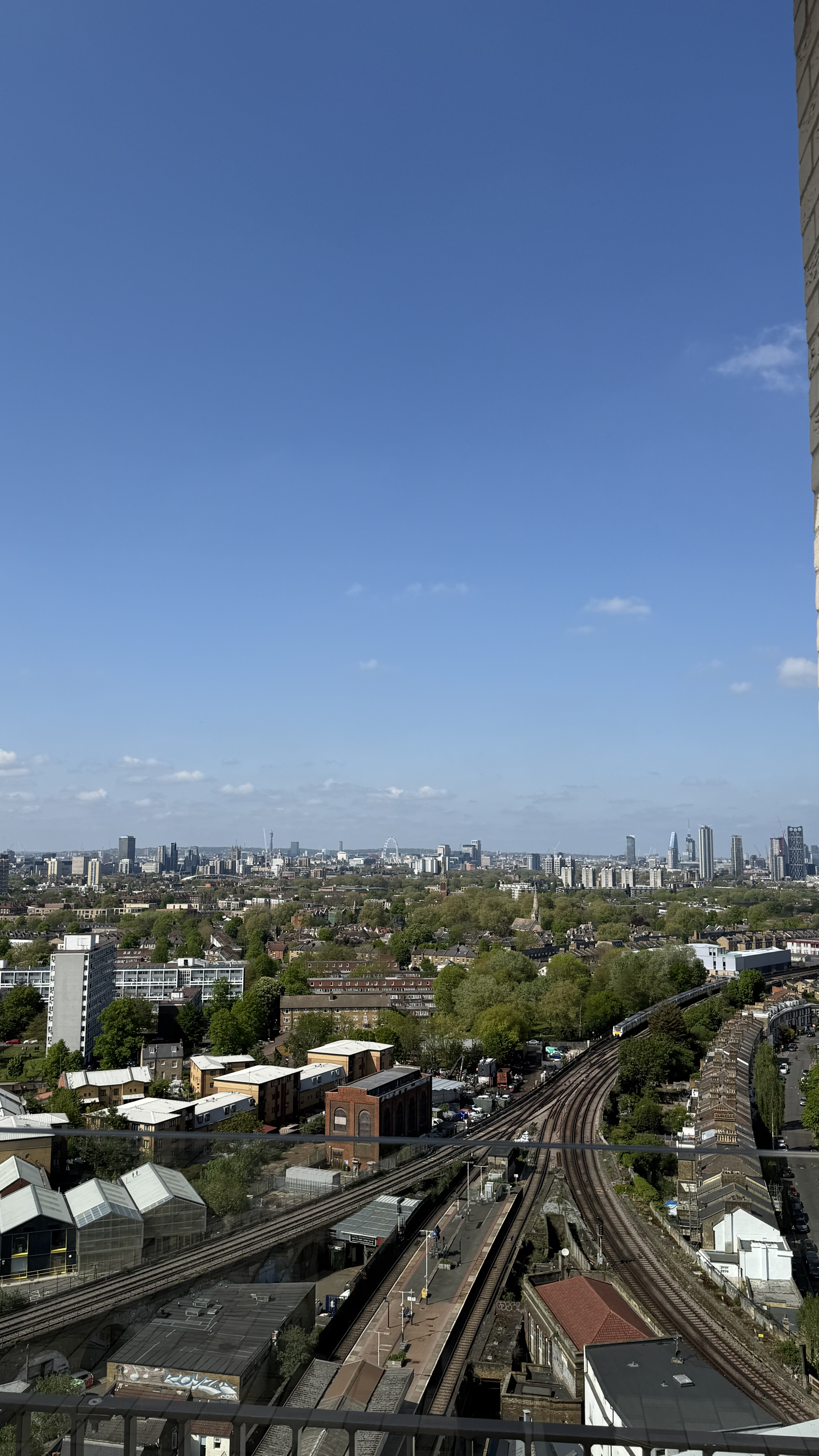
Loughborough Junction railway station in 2025 and Central London skyline viewed from Higgs Yard in nearby Herne Hill

Loughborough Junction is an area in Herne Hill, South London, in the London Borough of Lambeth. It is located equidistant between Herne Hill, Brixton and Camberwell providing excellent transport connections to Central London. While it is not a formal neighbourhood, it straddles postcodes SE24 (Herne Hill), SW9 (Brixton) and SE5 (Camberwell).

Loughborough Junction is centred on a rail junction consisting of four railway lines and seven railway bridges, six of which can be seen at once from the centre of the junction and date from 19th Century.

The source of this area's name is Loughborough Junction railway station; 'Loughborough' because the area was once the location of Loughborough House, the residence of Henry Hastings, 1st Baron Loughborough, which was previously the Manor House of Lambeth Wick.

== History ==
The source of this area's name is 'Loughborough' because the area was once the location of Loughborough House, the residence of Henry Hastings, 1st Baron Loughborough, which was previously the Manor House of Lambeth Wick.

In 1660 Lord Loughborough acquired the old manor house of Lambeth Wick, which had extensive grounds occupying an area then known as Cold Harbour. The house later became a boys' school and was demolished in 1854, when the Loughborough Park estate was being laid out. The Victorian Loughborough Hotel (now converted to flats) occupies the site of the manor house, on the bend of what is now Loughborough Road. (As of September 2020 Loughborough Hotel has re-opened as an art gallery and an artisan Annapurna Café)

Loughborough Junction station opened in 1863 (one year after Herne Hill Station and three years earlier than Denmark Hill Station). The arrival of the railways transformed the area from a wealthy suburb with large residential estates into a densely populated urban area. John Ruskin left the area in 1872 complaining that railways have spoilt the view. Today, the railway arches are considered to provide the Victorian charm of 19th century in an otherwise urban area.

By the end of the 19th century, many of the area's larger villas were being subdivided into flats. A number of these houses survive to present date but much of the area's housing stock was lost in a post-war demolition programme around Coldharbour Lane to clear the way for an inner London ring road that was never built. The council flats of the Loughborough estate subsequently filled the breach, notably the eleven-storey blocks around Barrington Road.

In this aspect, Loughborough Junction is similar to Pimlico in Westminster with a grid of Victorian houses neighbouring council estate blocks of Lupus Street.

=== Transport ===
Loughborough Junction Railway station is on the Thameslink route between Luton and Sutton. This provides Loughborough Junction with a direct link southbound to Herne Hill, Streatham, Tooting, Wimbledon, Mitcham, and Sutton, amongst other destinations in South London. Northbound services run through the City of London (Blackfriars, Farringdon) and St Pancras. Destinations north of St Pancras include Kentish Town, West Hampstead and St Albans.

Also, Southeastern service between Blackfriars and Kent runs through Loughborough Junction. This section of the South London Line that passes through Loughborough Junction is one of the major cross-London rail freight routes, carrying traffic from the Channel Tunnel and the ports of the Thames Estuary to destinations west and north of London.

Several bus routes pass via Loughborough Junction (35, 45, 345, P4) providing convenient connections between Central London and South East.

== Governance ==
From 2002 to 2022, Loughborough Junction was situated in two wards, Coldharbour and Herne Hill. The 2018 council elections saw the Labour Party win five out of the six seats up for election with The Green Party winning one of them. Its MP constituency is Dulwich and West Norwood held since 2015 by Labour MP Helen Hayes.

The Loughborough Junction Action Group (LJAG) was formed by volunteer residents in 2008 with a view to regenerate the area. LJAG worked with the council to form a masterplan for the area, with consultation events held with local residents to ascertain how they would like the area to be improved. These plans were developed during 2013.

== Geography ==
Loughborough Junction can be found within the postal codes of SE5 and SW9, which shows its southern central position. It is between Herne Hill, Brixton and Camberwell and it is officially part of the Herne Hill ward within the London Borough of Lambeth. The main road passing through it is Coldharbour Lane, which runs from central Brixton all the way to Camberwell and intersects with the leafy Herne Hill Road.

The area follows a typical cycle of deterioration and subsequent gentrification. The deterioration was due partly to planning blight related to transport schemes that were never realised and to the neglect of its housing stock by both private and council landlords. The Green Man is now a 'skills hub' run by Lambeth council. The Warrior was for a short time used for occasional pop-up cultural events—particularly the "7 Bridges" project, a locally-based initiative to improve the area—but has now been redeveloped as a Tesco Metro supermarket.

Loughborough Junction is home to Whirled Arts, which runs a cinema in the railway arches on Hardess Street, showing mainly arthouse and foreign-language films, and also hosting literary and musical events. There are also several art galleries and artists' studios in the immediate area.

The property in the area is a mixture of Victorian and Georgian mansion blocks and town houses, and local authority housing estates. The main estates are the Loughborough Estate, by modernist architect Sir Leslie Martin (designer of the Royal Festival Hall), the Angell Town Estate and the Moorlands Estate.

To the south of the area is Ruskin Park, situated on a hill with views over central London, where there are tennis courts, enclosed courts for ball games, a children's playground and a large area used for football matches on the weekends. There is also a large dog-free area and a flower garden.

The neighbouring areas of London are Brixton, Camberwell, Denmark Hill, North Dulwich and Stockwell.

== In fiction ==
The area features in the novel by Stella Duffy The Room Of Lost Things, set in a dry cleaners on Coldharbour Lane.

== Crime ==
In a 2003 article in the London Evening Standard, journalist David Cohen described Coldharbour Lane, on which Loughborough Junction is situated, as the most dangerous street in the most dangerous borough in London. The headline asked whether the street is 'the most dangerous in Britain'. Loughborough Junction was for a time territory of GAS Gang, considered by the police to be one of the most dangerous gangs in South London in 2012.

In June 2018, three graffiti artists, aged between 19 and 23, died when they were hit by a train at Loughborough Junction station. British Transport Police later warned of the "massive risk" graffiti artists make by trespassing on train tracks. A former Transport for London (TfL) board member, Brian Cooke, was criticised by social media users after he tweeted that the three men who died were "common scum who cost the railway millions and keep fares high".

== Notable people ==
- Charlie Chaplin and Stan Laurel studied and rehearsed at Fred Karno's 'Fun Factory' on Southwell Road.
- Writer Stella Duffy is a local resident.
- David Greig was the founder of the David Greig supermarket (initially grocery shop) chain rivaling Sainsbury's with its headquarters at Atlantic Road, Loughborough Junction.
- Former British prime minister John Major lived at 144 Coldharbour Lane from 1955 to 1959. Major Close is named after him.
- William Minet a British landowner and philanthropist who in 1890 donated the 14 acres that became London's Myatt's Fields Park and paid for construction of Minet Library which now houses Lambeth Archives.
- John Ruskin a renowned 19th Century art critic was a local resident.
- Vincent van Gogh took lodgings nearby in 87 Hackford Road (Stockwell) and probably passed through Loughborough Junction on his brisk walks to Dulwich Picture Gallery.
