= Brixton Windrush =

- Electoral ward for the Lambeth London Borough Council
- Brixton Windrush ward boundaries since 2022
- Borough: Lambeth
- County: Greater London
- Population: 9,482 (2021) (Note: 2021 Census data reported for 2022 ward boundaries)
- Electorate: 6,974 (2026)
- Major settlements: Brixton
- Area: 0.6033 square kilometres (0.2329 sq mi)

Current electoral ward
- Created: 2022
- Number of members: 2
- Councillors: Carlotta Allum; Serafina Spicer
- GSS code: E05014098

Brixton Windrush is an electoral ward in the London Borough of Lambeth. The ward was first used in the 2022 elections. It returns two councillors to Lambeth London Borough Council.

== List of councillors ==
Term	Councillor	Party
2022–2026	Scarlett O'Hara	Labour Co-op
2022–2026	Donatus Anyanwu	Labour Co-op
2026–present	Carlotta Allum	Green
2026–present	Serafina Spicer	Green

== Lambeth council elections ==
=== 2026 election ===
The election took place on 7 May 2026.

2026 Lambeth London Borough Council election: Brixton Windrush (2)
Party	Candidate	Votes	%	±%
Green	Carlotta Allum	1,297	47.4	+15.8
Green	Serafina Spicer	1,217	44.4	+23.2
Labour Co-op	Scarlett O'Hara*	975	35.6	−27.5
Labour Co-op	Donatus Anyanwu*	965	35.2	−26.3
Independent	Joanne Scott	321	11.7	N/A
Liberal Democrats	Florence Cyrot	139	5.1	−0.6
Liberal Democrats	Gianluca Carli	138	5.0	−1.2
Conservative	Joel Langford	98	3.6	−1.9
Reform	Oliver Khan	83	3.0	N/A
Conservative	Arthur Virgo	78	2.8	−2.4
Turnout		2,739	39.3	+12.3
Registered electors		6,974		
Green gain from Labour Co-op				
Green gain from Labour Co-op				

=== 2022 election ===
The election took place on 5 May 2022.

2022 Lambeth London Borough Council election: Brixton Windrush (2)
Party	Candidate	Votes	%	±%
Labour Co-op	Scarlett O'Hara	1,143	63.1	
Labour Co-op	Donatus Anyanwu	1,114	61.5	
Green	Becca Thackray	572	31.6	
Green	Tom Wood	384	21.2	
Liberal Democrats	Alex Haylett	112	6.2	
Liberal Democrats	Florence Cyrot	101	5.6	
Conservative	Sarah Roberts	100	5.5	
Conservative	Kelly Ben-Maimon	94	5.2	
Turnout		1,858	27.0	
Labour Co-op win (new seat)				
Labour Co-op win (new seat)				
