= Jim Dickson (politician) =

British politician

Jim Dickson MP
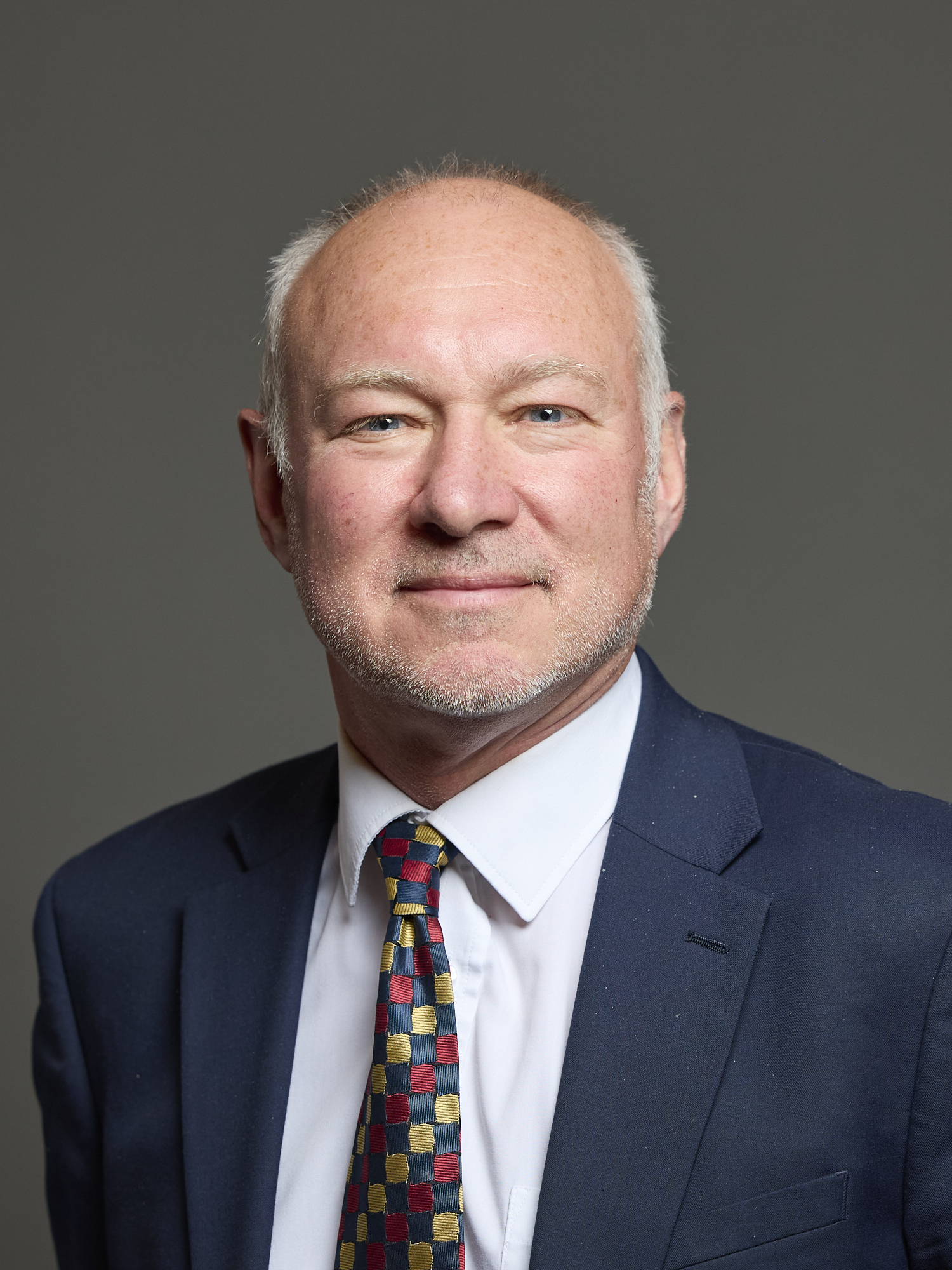
- Official portrait, 2024

Member of Parliament for Dartford
- Incumbent
- Assumed office 4 July 2024
- Preceded by: Gareth Johnson

Leader of Lambeth Council
- In office September 1994 – March 2000
- Preceded by: Steve Whaley
- Succeeded by: Tom Franklin

Personal details
- Born: James Rowan Chatterton Dickson; 16 January 1964 (age 62)
- Party: Labour
- Domestic partner: Nicola
- Education: Jesus College, Cambridge

Jim Dickson is a British Labour Party politician who has served as the Member of Parliament (MP) for Dartford since 2024. He served as the local councillor for Herne Hill & Loughborough Junction ward in the London Borough of Lambeth for over 30 years. He was also Leader of Lambeth Council between 1994 and 2000.

At the 2024 general election, Dickson defeated Gareth Johnson of the Conservative Party in the longest standing bellwether seat, having previously led Lambeth Council, served as Politics Director at consultancy firm Four Communications, and been a Director at Canning Town-based charity the Thames Festival Trust. Jim Dickson is one of two Lambeth Councillors to have gone on to become Labour MP for Dartford, the first being his predecessor Jennie Adamson in 1938 - Dartford's wartime MP who also served in the Attlee government - who had previously served on the London County Council for Lambeth North.

== Early life and career ==
Dickson was educated at Wellington College, Berkshire, and Jesus College, Cambridge, where he read Social and Political Sciences. Whilst at Cambridge he was elected as Chair of the Cambridge University Labour Club. From 1989, Dickson worked for the London Housing Unit as a Senior Policy Officer for ten years. In 1998 he was a Visiting Lecturer at the University of Westminster until 2000. Between 2000 and 2003 he worked as an Associate for Weber Shandwick. He previously worked for the consultancy firm Four Communications as Politics Director. He is a member of the Association of Professional Political Consultants.

== Political career ==
=== Lambeth council ===
Dickson was first elected as a Councillor for Herne Hill in the 1990 Lambeth London Borough Council election, and he became the Leader of Lambeth Council in 1994.

Dickson has held various cabinet positions on the Lambeth Borough Council. He was leading Lambeth's Labour Group when it was praised as being "more New Labour than New Labour" by former Prime Minister Sir Tony Blair. He is a member of Progressive Britain.

=== Member of Parliament ===
At the 2001 General Election he was Labour's candidate in Old Bexley and Sidcup.

At the 2024 General Election, Dickson was elected as the MP for Dartford. His key election policy was 'Taking Pride in Dartford', an initiative to revitalise Dartford's high streets and cultural scene. Since being elected to parliament, Dickson has attracted local attention to his campaign to get the A226 Galley Hill Road rebuilt and reopened. In 2024, he called for additional government funding towards dementia, citing challenges with the disease in his own family. In November 2024, Dickson was among 34 MPs who signed a letter demanding that the management agency FirstPort face scrutiny in parliament. He voted in favour of legalising assisted dying. In 2025, in the wake of videos circulating on TikTok of animals being harmed by catapults, Jim Dickson called for increased powers for the police to be able to confiscate catapults from under 18s. In October 2025, he was elected on to the Treasury Select Committee.

Parliament of the United Kingdom
Preceded by Gareth Johnson	Member of Parliament for Dartford; 2024–present	Incumbent
