= Streatham and Croydon North =

UK Parliament constituency (since 2024)

- Borough constituency for the House of Commons
- Interactive map of boundaries since 2024
- Location within Greater London
- County: Greater London
- Electorate: 76,050 (March 2020)
- Major settlements: Crystal Palace, Norbury, Streatham, Thornton Heath, Upper Norwood

Current constituency
- Created: 2024
- Member of Parliament: Steve Reed (Labour Co-op)
- Seats: One
- Created from: Croydon North and Streatham

Streatham and Croydon North is a constituency in Greater London represented in the House of Commons of the Parliament of the United Kingdom. It is currently represented by Steve Reed of the Labour and Co-operative Party, who was the Secretary of State for Housing, Communities and Local Government under the government of Keir Starmer. Reed was MP for Croydon North from 2012 to 2024.

The constituency was created in the 2023 Periodic Review of Westminster constituencies, and first contested at the 2024 general election.

== Constituency profile ==
Amesbury Avenue, Streatham

Streatham and Croydon North is a constituency in Greater London in England, covering parts of the boroughs of Lambeth and Croydon. It includes the areas of Streatham and Norbury and parts of Upper Norwood and Thornton Heath.

This is a mostly suburban constituency located around 6 miles (9.7 km) south of the centre of London. It was largely rural until the late 19th and early 20th centuries when the arrival of rail transport encouraged suburban development, although the area is not served by the London Underground. There are a variety of housing types here; most residents of Streatham live in flats or shared houses whilst terraced properties are more common in Norbury and Thornton Heath. The constituency has average levels of wealth, however there is some deprivation in Thornton Heath. House prices across the constituency are generally lower than the London average.

Streatham and Croydon North has a large population of young and middle-aged adults and a low proportion of retirees. Like much of London, residents have high rates of income but low levels of homeownership compared to the rest of the UK. The child poverty rate is in line with the London and UK-wide figures. Residents are generally well-educated and a high proportion work in the retail, health and education sectors. The percentage claiming unemployment benefits is high.

Streatham and Croydon North is ethnically diverse. White people made up 49% of the population at the 2021 census, around one-third of whom were of non-British origin, including large Spanish and Polish communities. Black people were the largest ethnic minority group at 23%, around half of whom were of Caribbean origin. Asians were 14% of residents and Mixed-race people were 8%.

Most of this constituency is represented by the Labour Party at the local borough council level, with some Green Party councillors elected in Streatham and Upper Norwood and Liberal Democrats elected in Streatham Wells. Voters in Streatham and Croydon North strongly supported remaining in the European Union in the 2016 referendum; an estimated 68% voted to remain compared to the UK-wide figure of 48%.

== Boundaries ==
The constituency is defined as comprising the following wards as they existed on 1 December 2020:

- The London Borough of Croydon wards of Crystal Palace and Upper Norwood, Norbury and Pollards Hill, Norbury Park and Thornton Heath, transferred from the abolished Croydon North constituency.
- The London Borough of Lambeth wards of St Leonard's, Streatham Hill, Streatham South and Streatham Wells, transferred from the abolished Streatham constituency.

Following a local government boundary review in the Borough of Lambeth which came into effect in May 2022, the constituency now comprises the following from the 2024 general election:

- The London Borough of Croydon wards of: Crystal Palace & Upper Norwood, Norbury & Pollards Hill, Norbury Park; Thornton Heath.
- The London Borough of Lambeth wards of: Clapham Park (small part); St Martin's (small part); Streatham Common & Vale; Streatham Hill East; Streatham Hill West & Thornton (part); Streatham St Leonard's; Streatham Wells.

It is the first time these areas have shared a constituency since the creation of the Wandsworth and Croydon constituencies in 1885.

== Incumbent MPs ==
The Labour Party decided Bell Ribeiro-Addy, MP for Streatham since 2019, would run in the new Clapham and Brixton Hill constituency, and Steve Reed, MP for Croydon North since 2012 would run in this new Streatham and Croydon North constituency.

== Members of Parliament ==
Croydon North and Streatham prior to 2024

Election	Member	Party
2024	Steve Reed	Labour Co-op

== Elections ==
=== Elections in the 2020s ===
General election 2024: Streatham and Croydon North
Party	Candidate	Votes	%	±%
Labour Co-op	Steve Reed	23,232	52.1	−5.8
Green	Scott Ainslie	7,629	17.1	+12.7
Conservative	Anthony Boutall	5,328	12.0	−6.8
Liberal Democrats	Claire Bonham	5,031	11.3	−6.2
Reform	Philip Watson	1,994	4.5	+3.2
Workers Party	Waseem Sherwani	910	2.0	N/A
CPA	Magdaline Nzekwue	290	0.7	N/A
SDP	Myles Owen	139	0.3	N/A
Majority		15,603	35.0	−4.1
Turnout		44,553	57.9	−9.6
Registered electors		76,966		
Labour hold		Swing	−9.3	

=== Elections in the 2010s ===
2019 notional result
Party	Vote	%
Labour	29,704	57.9
Conservative	9,666	18.8
Liberal Democrats	9,002	17.5
Green	2,278	4.4
Brexit Party	658	1.3
Turnout	51,308	67.5
Electorate	76,050	
