= 2026 Lambeth London Borough Council election =

2026 English local government election

- 7 May 2026

All 63 seats to Lambeth London Borough Council 32 seats needed for a majority
- Registered: 226,006
- Turnout: 89,065; 39.4% (▲7.7%)
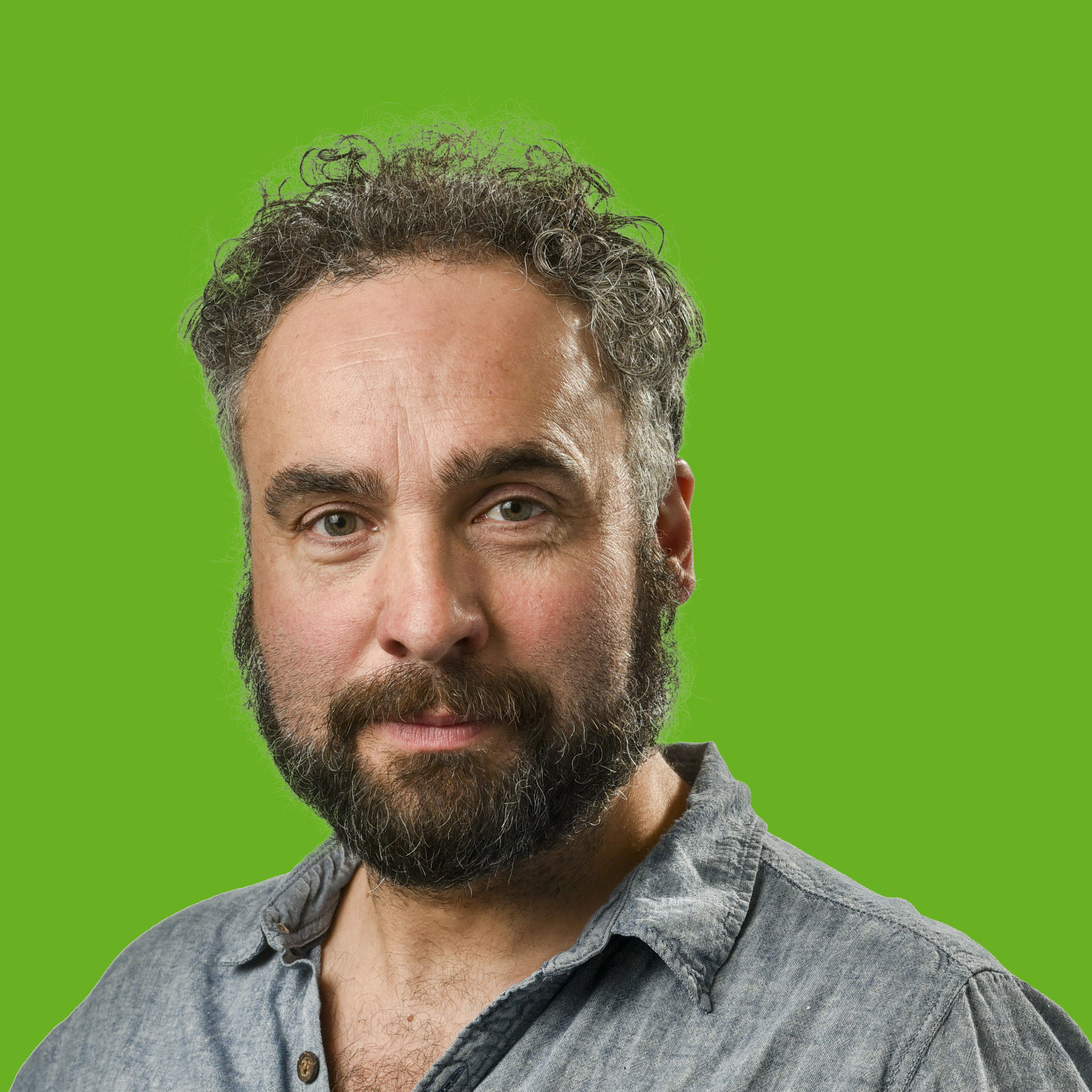

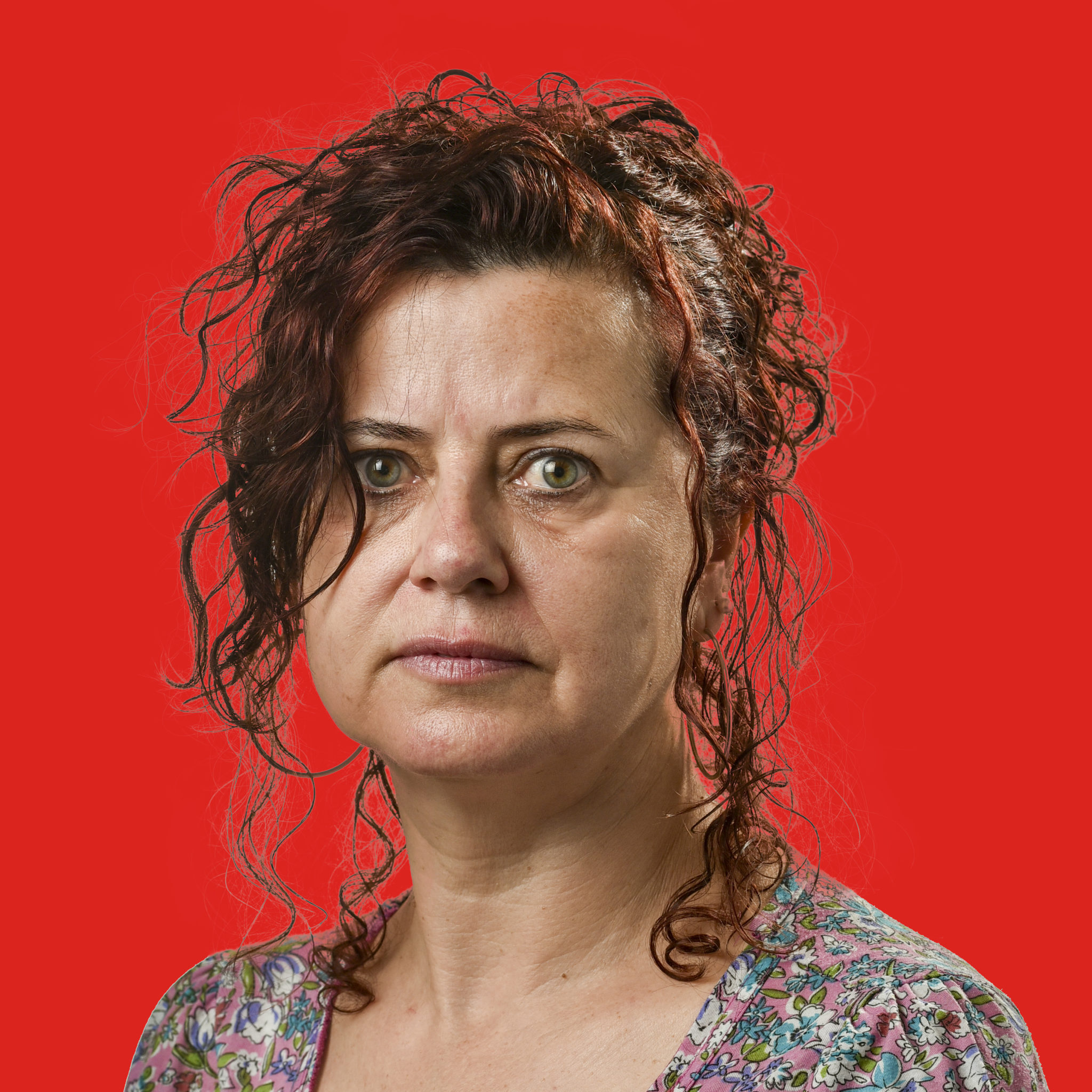
	First party	Second party	Third party
Leader	Scott Ainslie (Note: Group leader prior to election; Martin Abrams was selected as leader of the Green group following the election)	Claire Holland	Donna Harris (retiring) (Note: Matthew Bryant was selected as the new leader of the Liberal Democrat group following the election.)
Party	Green	Labour	Liberal Democrats
Last election	2 seats, 22.2%	58 seats, 54.1%	3 seats, 11.4%
Seats before	4	54	4
Seats won	29 (Note: Including Saiqa Ali, who was on the ballot as a Green but suspended by the party)	26	8
Seat change	▲27	▼32	▲5
Popular vote	82,141	77,136	33,641
Percentage	36.9%	34.7%	15.1%
Swing	▲14.7pp	▼19.4pp	▲3.7pp
- Map of the results of the 2026 Lambeth council election. Greens in green, Labour in red and Liberal Democrats in orange.
Leader before election
Claire Holland
Labour Co-op
Leader after election
Martin Abrams
Green

The 2026 Lambeth London Borough Council election took place on 7 May 2026, as part of the 2026 United Kingdom local elections. All 63 members of Lambeth London Borough Council were elected. The election took place alongside local elections in the other London boroughs.

Prior to the election, the council was under Labour majority control. At the election, the council went under no overall control. The Green Party overtook Labour to become the largest party, but fell three seats short of a majority. They chose Martin Abrams to be the new leader of the Green group on 13 May. He was subsequently formally appointed as the new leader of the council on 1 June 2026.

== Background ==
=== History ===
Result of the 2022 election

The thirty-two London boroughs were established in 1965 by the London Government Act 1963. They are the principal authorities in Greater London and have responsibilities including education, housing, planning, highways, social services, libraries, recreation, waste, environmental health and revenue collection. Some of the powers are shared with the Greater London Authority, which also manages passenger transport, police and fire.

Since its formation, Lambeth has generally been under Labour control apart from one period from 1968 to 1971 of Conservative control and several periods of no overall control. The council was controlled by a Liberal Democrat-Conservative coalition from 2002 to 2006, and from 2006 until this election continuously had a Labour majority.

== Changes since 2022 ==
=== By-elections ===
Following the 2022 elections, the Labour Party secured a majority on Lambeth Council with 58 seats. The Liberal Democrats formed the official opposition with three seats, while the Green Party won two.

A by-election in the Vauxhall ward was held in October 2023, following the death of Labour councillor Liam Jarnecki. Labour retained the seat, with Tom Swaine-Jameson.

Two by-elections took place in May 2024. In Knight’s Hill, Labour councillor Sonia Winifred resigned after having the party whip suspended for defying it in a Gaza ceasefire vote. Labour held the seat, with Emma Nye elected. On the same day, a by-election was held in Streatham Common and Vale following the resignation of Tom Rutland, who stepped down to focus on contesting East Worthing and Shoreham. Labour retained the seat, electing Sarah Cole.

A further by-election in Streatham Common and Vale took place in July 2024 after the resignation of Hena Shah. The seat was again held by Labour, with Dominic Armstrong elected.

In May 2025, a by-election was held in Herne Hill and Loughborough Junction following the election of Jim Dickson as MP for Dartford. The seat was gained by the Green Party, with Paul Valentine elected, making the Greens the joint opposition party on the council.

=== Affiliation changes ===
Cllr Martin Abrams resigned from the Labour Party in August 2025, highlighting a culture of alleged bullying and factionalism. He was suspended by Lambeth Labour in early 2024 after voting for a ceasefire motion in Gaza. He joined the Greens in September 2025, making them the official opposition group on Lambeth Council.

In July 2025, Cllr Irfan Mohammed was suspended from Labour after being charged with a criminal offences relating to exposure, controlling behaviour and sexual assault. He sat as an independent.

In November 2025, Cllr Christiana (Tina) Valcarcel, defected to the Liberal Democrats, making them the joint opposition party on the council.

== Council composition ==
After 2022 election		Before 2026 election		After 2026 election	
Party	Seats	Party	Seats	Party	Seats
Labour	58	Labour	54	Green	28
Liberal Democrats	3	Liberal Democrats	4	Labour	26
Green	2	Green	4	Liberal Democrats	8
Independent	0	Independent	1	Independent	1

Of the 63 seats, the Green Party won 29 seats, making it the largest party on the council for the first time but without an overall majority. Labour won 26 seats, the Liberal Democrats eight. Saiqa Ali, who was elected in Streatham St Leonard's under the Green Party banner was suspended by the party during the campaign over alleged antisemitic social media posts. Despite her suspension, electoral law required her name to remain on the ballot. A Green Party spokesman confirmed she would sit on the council as an independent, though she received a third fewer votes than the ward's top-ranked Green candidate.

== Result summary ==
Council composition after the 2022 election

Council composition after the 2026 election

2026 Lambeth London Borough Council election
Party	Seats	Gains	Losses	Net gain/loss	Seats %	Votes %	Votes	+/−
Green	29*	27	0	▲27	46.1%	36.9%	82,141	+14.7
Labour	26	0	32	▼32	41.2%	34.7%	77,136	-19.4
Liberal Democrats	8	5	0	▲5	12.7%	15.1%	33,641	+3.7
Conservative	0	0	0	Steady	0.0%	8.0%	17,697	-3.9
Reform	0	0	0	Steady	0.0%	4.0%	8,791	+4.0
Independent	0	0	0	Steady	0.0%	1.0%	2,261	New
TUSC	0	0	0	Steady	0.0%	0.2%	401	±0.0
Socialist (GB)	0	0	0	Steady	0.0%	0.1%	159	+0.1
CPA	0	0	0	Steady	0.0%	0.0%	100	New
SDP	0	0	0	Steady	0.0%	0.0%	38	New
Total	63						222,371	

Council composition following the election in May 2026 and the suspension of a Green councillor:

↓
28	26	8	1
Green	Labour	Lib Dems	Ind

== Electoral process ==
Lambeth, as is the case all other London borough councils, elects all of its councillors at once every four years, with the previous election having taken place in 2022. The election takes place by multi-member first-past-the-post voting, with each ward being represented by two or three councillors. Electors will have as many votes as there are councillors to be elected in their ward, with the top two or three being elected.

All registered electors (British, Irish, Commonwealth and European Union citizens) living in London aged 18 or over are entitled to vote in the election. People who live at two addresses in different councils, such as university students with different term-time and holiday addresses, are entitled to be registered for and vote in elections in both local authorities. Voting in-person at polling stations takes place from 7:00 to 22:00 on election day, and voters are able to apply for postal votes or proxy votes in advance of the election.

== Campaign ==
At the beginning of March 2026, The Guardian reported on MRP modelling from data company Bombe which forecast that Lambeth would be one of the London boroughs Labour loses to the Green Party.

=== Labour ===
In September 2025, Labour's candidate selections in Lambeth for the 2026 council elections were suspended after local member Mark Sheiham launched a High Court challenge against being blocked from standing.

=== Greens ===
During the campaign, the Green Party faced controversy over its candidate in Streatham St Leonard's ward on Lambeth Council — the party's strongest ward in the borough, where all three sitting councillors are Green. Saiqa Ali came under scrutiny after The Spectator reported on social media posts attributed to her Instagram account. The posts included an image of a masked, armed fighter described as wearing a Hamas headband, captioned "Long live the Resistance"; a depiction of the Earth being crushed by a serpent bearing the Star of David; and a repost of a mural widely condemned as antisemitic, which had previously drawn criticism when Jeremy Corbyn was found to have engaged with it in 2018. Following contact from The Spectator, Ali's Instagram account was set to private. Questions were also raised about whether Ali met the residency or workplace requirements to stand in Lambeth, as her nomination papers listed a home address in the neighbouring borough of Croydon.

Separately, Sabine Mairey, the party's candidate in Clapham Town ward, was reported to have shared a Facebook post describing an attack on a synagogue as "not antisemitism" but "revenge," referencing a vehicle-ramming incident at a synagogue in Michigan earlier in the year. Mark Bittlestone, a comedian and history teacher also standing in Clapham Town, was found by the Daily Mail to have reposted material suggesting the October 7 attacks were a covert "false flag," and to have shared posts from other users describing Israel as a "colony of inbreds, rapists and thieves" and claiming it had no right to exist. Bittlestone deleted all his social media profiles following the exposé. Both Ali and Mairey were subsequently arrested by the Metropolitan Police on suspicion of stirring up racial hatred online, an offence under section 19 of the Public Order Act 1986. Neither candidate appeared on the Lambeth Green Party's website thereafter, and the party said the posts did not reflect its views.

== Results by ward ==
An asterisk * at the end of a candidates name highlights an existing councillor seeking re-election

=== Brixton Acre Lane ===
Brixton Acre Lane (3 seats)
Party	Candidate	Votes	%	±%
Green	Natalie Kane	1,835	40.7	+15.2
Green	Michael Chessum	1,792	39.7	+21.7
Labour	David Bridson*	1,684	37.3	−18.3
Labour	Sarbaz Barznji*	1,669	37.0	−18.4
Green	Dario Goodwin	1,667	37.0	+20.8
Labour	Bev Randall	1,587	35.2	−22.3
Liberal Democrats	Heather Glass	410	9.1	−1.3
Liberal Democrats	Sarah Lewis	387	8.6	+1.2
Conservative	Charlotte Black	361	8.0	−3.0
Independent	Ruby Bukhari	347	7.7	N/A
Liberal Democrats	Joanna Pycroft	290	6.4	−1.6
Conservative	Alexander Buszard	269	6.0	−4.8
Conservative	Lee Roberts	267	5.9	−4.3
Reform	John Duffy	261	5.8	N/A
Reform	Louis Middleton	243	5.4	N/A
Turnout		4,510	41.2	+11.8
Registered electors		10,948		
Green gain from Labour				
Green gain from Labour				
Labour hold				

=== Brixton North ===
Brixton North (3 seats)
Party	Candidate	Votes	%	±%
Labour Co-op	Nanda Manley-Browne*	1,415	40.9	−26.5
Green	Samantha Dorney-Smith	1,388	40.2	+14.9
Labour Co-op	John-Paul Ennis*	1,365	39.5	−22.6
Green	Rolf Britten	1,304	37.7	+18.4
Labour Co-op	James Seabridge	1,189	34.4	−31.5
Green	Tim Gingell	1,169	33.8	+15.7
Independent	Eduardo Salgado	372	10.8	N/A
Conservative	Claire Collins	261	7.6	−0.4
Conservative	Marcia Da Costa	252	7.3	−0.4
Liberal Democrats	Monica Whyte	215	6.2	−1.5
Liberal Democrats	John Siraut	200	5.8	−1.3
Reform	Adam De Bell	189	5.5	N/A
Liberal Democrats	Ian Tedder	186	5.4	+0.5
Conservative	Kathryn Uhde	167	4.8	−2.6
Socialist (GB)	Anya Krycek	77	2.2	N/A
TUSC	Theo Sharieff	53	1.5	N/A
Turnout		3,456	31.3	+5.5
Registered electors		11,046		
Labour Co-op hold				
Green gain from Labour Co-op				
Labour Co-op hold				

=== Brixton Rush Common ===
Brixton Rush Common (3 seats)
Party	Candidate	Votes	%	±%
Green	Zvikomborero Chihoro	2,132	47.0	+17.7
Green	Sacha Takyi-Berko	2,106	46.4	+22.1
Green	Viktor Westerdahl	1,982	43.7	+23.0
Labour	Marcia Cameron*	1,810	39.9	−25.5
Labour	Ben Kind*	1,676	36.9	−23.2
Labour	Adrian Garden*	1,572	34.6	−21.6
Liberal Democrats	Ben Austin	359	7.9	−0.9
Liberal Democrats	Abbi Alsalmi	317	7.0	−2.0
Liberal Democrats	Paul Medlicott	239	5.3	−1.5
Conservative	Elaine Tamara Bailey	216	4.8	−1.9
Conservative	Ella Ruth Mulford	207	4.6	−2.0
Reform	David Palmer	207	4.6	N/A
Conservative	Lavinia Arden Cartwright	197	4.3	−2.0
CPA	Yemi Awolola	100	2.2	N/A
Turnout		4,537	42.6	+11.7
Registered electors		10,645		
Green gain from Labour				
Green gain from Labour				
Green gain from Labour				

=== Brixton Windrush ===
Brixton Windrush (2 seats)
Party	Candidate	Votes	%	±%
Green	Carlotta Allum	1,297	47.4	+15.8
Green	Serafina Spicer	1,217	44.4	+23.2
Labour Co-op	Scarlett O'Hara*	975	35.6	−27.5
Labour Co-op	Donatus Anyanwu*	965	35.2	−26.3
Independent	Joanne Scott	321	11.7	N/A
Liberal Democrats	Florence Cyrot	139	5.1	−0.6
Liberal Democrats	Gianluca Carli	138	5.0	−1.2
Conservative	Joel Langford	98	3.6	−1.9
Reform	Oliver Khan	83	3.0	N/A
Conservative	Arthur Virgo	78	2.8	−2.4
Turnout		2,739	39.3	+12.3
Registered electors		6,974		
Green gain from Labour Co-op				
Green gain from Labour Co-op				

=== Clapham Common & Abbeville ===
Clapham Common & Abbeville (2 seats)
Party	Candidate	Votes	%	±%
Liberal Democrats	Chris Nicholson	1,331	41.2	+5.9
Liberal Democrats	Simon Cordon	1,195	37.0	+6.0
Labour	Alison Inglis-Jones*	1,116	34.6	+2.1
Labour	Joe Briel	789	24.4	−7.7
Green	Andrew Mclellan	441	13.7	+4.7
Green	Shâo-Lan Yuen	423	13.1	+5.3
Conservative	Joe Tetlow	347	10.8	−16.6
Conservative	Guy Roberts	331	10.3	−13.8
Reform	Andrew Bell	194	6.0	+5.2
Reform	James Graham	173	5.4	N/A
Socialist (GB)	Jacqueline Shodeke	14	0.4	N/A
Turnout		3,227	43.6	+4.4
Registered electors		7,393		
Liberal Democrats hold				
Liberal Democrats gain from Labour				

=== Clapham East ===
Clapham East (2 seats)
Party	Candidate	Votes	%	±%
Labour Co-op	Erica Abu	928	41.7	−26.4
Green	Cat Thomson	803	36.1	+11.3
Labour Co-op	Christopher Wongsosaputro	706	31.8	−33.0
Green	Andre Schmidt	697	31.4	N/A
Liberal Democrats	Duncan Brack	240	10.8	−2.7
Liberal Democrats	Alex Haylett	217	9.8	N/A
Conservative	Vernon De Maynard	213	9.6	−3.4
Conservative	John Hindson	204	9.2	−2.5
Reform	Alexander Anderson	190	8.5	N/A
Reform	Mark McKee	160	7.2	N/A
Turnout		2,223	30.9	+7.6
Registered electors		7,187		
Labour Co-op hold				
Green gain from Labour Co-op				

=== Clapham Park ===
Clapham Park (3 seats)
Party	Candidate	Votes	%	±%
Labour Co-op	Verity McGivern*	1,285	41.2	−23.4
Labour Co-op	Martin Tiedemann*	1,158	37.1	−19.8
Green	Joanna Eaves	1,154	37.0	+13.0
Labour Co-op	Louie Somerville-Sutherland	1,117	35.8	−23.4
Green	Yannis Baur	1,033	33.1	+15.4
Green	David James	938	30.1	+13.2
Liberal Democrats	Ben Amos	364	11.7	+1.7
Liberal Democrats	Karen Hautz	312	10.0	+1.3
Conservative	Shirley Cosgrave	308	9.9	−2.8
Liberal Democrats	Donal Kane	262	8.4	+0.6
Conservative	Lee Rotherham	259	8.3	−3.7
Reform	Martin Read	235	7.5	N/A
Conservative	Leila Yaasen	205	6.6	−3.1
Independent	Harry O'Donoghue	202	6.5	N/A
SDP	Sandy McDougall	38	1.2	N/A
Turnout		3,120	33.1	+7.5
Registered electors		9,436		
Labour Co-op hold				
Labour Co-op hold				
Green gain from Labour Co-op				

=== Clapham Town ===
Clapham Town (3 seats)
Party	Candidate	Votes	%	±%
Labour	Linda Bray*	1,631	37.2	−14.3
Labour	Patrick O'Donnell	1,523	34.7	−7.0
Green	Jonathan Bartley	1,451	33.1	+12.0
Labour	David Robson*	1,430	32.6	−13.8
Green	Mark Bittlestone	1,313	29.9	+14.3
Green	Sabine Mairey	1,159	26.4	+12.7
Conservative	Joshua Forrester	833	19.0	−10.8
Conservative	Neil Salt	785	17.9	−10.5
Conservative	Promise Phillips	784	17.9	−9.9
Liberal Democrats	Marietta Crichton Stuart	420	9.6	−4.4
Liberal Democrats	Julian Heather	355	8.1	−1.8
Reform	Anna Marles	323	7.4	N/A
Liberal Democrats	Colin Penning	304	6.9	N/A
Reform	Christine Nikolaizig	299	6.8	N/A
Reform	Alexander Pollock	298	6.8	N/A
Turnout		4,388	38.3	+7.6
Registered electors		11,465		
Labour hold				
Labour hold				
Green gain from Labour				

=== Gipsy Hill ===
Gipsy Hill (2 seats)
Party	Candidate	Votes	%	±%
Green	Pete Elliott	1,666	50.5	+6.0
Green	Chloe Hawryluk	1,593	48.3	+7.4
Labour	Christine Banton*	1,243	37.7	−13.3
Labour	Robert Shorrock	964	29.2	−17.2
Reform	Felix Hardinge	238	7.2	N/A
Conservative	Michael Jefferson	233	7.1	+0.2
Liberal Democrats	Vivienne Baines	167	5.1	+1.6
Liberal Democrats	Malcolm Baines	148	4.5	+2.8
Conservative	Andrei Lucaci	126	3.8	−1.2
TUSC	Bobbie-Jay Cranney	40	1.2	N/A
Turnout		3,301	42.2	+4.9
Registered electors		7,825		
Green gain from Labour				
Green gain from Labour				

=== Herne Hill & Loughborough Junction ===
Herne Hill & Loughborough Junction (3 seats)
Party	Candidate	Votes	%	±%
Green	Ciara Alleyne	2,931	54.4	+14.4
Green	Paul Valentine*	2,705	50.2	+10.6
Green	Alan Andrews	2,681	49.7	+15.8
Labour Co-op	Deepak Sardiwal*	1,873	34.7	−16.3
Labour Co-op	Stephen Clark	1,694	31.4	−21.5
Labour Co-op	Marianna Masters	1,649	30.6	−21.5
Liberal Democrats	Rob Blackie	403	7.5	+1.8
Conservative	Alex Deane	329	6.1	+0.6
Conservative	Ray Chapman	309	5.7	+0.2
Liberal Democrats	Jonathan Price	294	5.5	+1.7
Liberal Democrats	Charley Hasted	279	5.2	+2.0
Conservative	Andrew Whitten	277	5.1	−0.2
Reform	Dick Tristram-Tooze	230	4.3	N/A
Turnout		5,390	47.1	+5.8
Registered electors		11,455		
Green gain from Labour Co-op				
Green gain from Labour Co-op				
Green gain from Labour Co-op				

=== Kennington ===
Joanne Simpson was a councillor for Stockwell West and Larkhall ward, elected in 2022.

Kennington (3)
Party	Candidate	Votes	%	±%
Labour	David Amos *	1,891	42.8	−15.9
Labour	Dominic Lynch	1,678	37.9	−19.6
Labour	Joanne Simpson *	1,667	37.7	−14.4
Green	Michael Ball	1,471	33.3	+10.2
Green	KJ Eastwood	1,298	29.3	+6.2
Green	James O'Nions	1,267	28.6	+6.0
Liberal Democrats	Stevan Cirkovic	919	20.8	+8.6
Liberal Democrats	Adrian Hyyrylainen-Trett	803	18.2	+7.7
Liberal Democrats	Wes Powell	771	17.4	+8.0
Conservative	Anne-Sophie Faivre	367	8.3	−3.0
Conservative	Elizabeth Jones	366	8.3	−1.5
Reform	William Jephcote	340	7.7	N/A
Conservative	Zachary Spiro	327	7.4	−2.2
TUSC	Peter Evans	62	1.4	N/A
TUSC	Johnny Reynolds	42	0.9	N/A
Turnout		4,624	40.6	+6.4
Registered electors		11,381		
Labour hold				
Labour hold				
Labour hold				

=== Knight's Hill ===
Knight's Hill (3)
Party	Candidate	Votes	%	±%
Green	Elizabeth Frazer	2,181	45.5	+18.3
Green	Lisa Schulkind	2,118	44.2	+24.7
Green	Matt Wilcock	2,020	42.1	+27.1
Labour	Ibtisam Adem *	1,923	40.1	−24.3
Labour	Jackie Meldrum *	1,882	39.3	−25.0
Labour	Emma Nye *	1,779	37.1	−23.3
Liberal Democrats	Karen Sainsbury	349	7.3	−0.7
Conservative	Gregory Ellis	342	7.1	−2.9
Reform	Charles Holt	320	6.7	N/A
Liberal Democrats	Fareed Alderechi	314	6.5	−0.5
Conservative	Sarah Roberts	311	6.5	−3.2
Reform	Tacita McCoy-Parkhill	287	6.0	N/A
Liberal Democrats	Nicholas Sanders	283	5.9	+0.3
Conservative	Michael Llewelyn-Jones	275	5.7	−3.4
Turnout		4,948	41.8	+10.2
Registered electors		11,835		
Green gain from Labour				
Green gain from Labour				
Green gain from Labour				

=== Myatt's Fields ===
Myatt's Fields (2)
Party	Candidate	Votes	%	±%
Green	Patience Clague	1,267	41.4	+19.8
Labour Co-op	Annie Gallop *	1,179	38.5	−24.7
Green	John Lubbock	1,162	37.9	+20.1
Labour Co-op	Molly Hartill	1,108	36.2	−26.0
Liberal Democrats	Chris Lomax	230	7.5	−2.8
Liberal Democrats	Annette Minott	220	7.2	−0.8
Independent	Tara Amfo	198	6.5	N/A
Reform	Tom Beardsworth	173	5.6	N/A
Conservative	Charles Pender	169	5.5	−3.4
Conservative	Tesfah Guwazah	132	4.3	−3.8
TUSC	Marco Tesei	27	0.9	N/A
Turnout		3,062	37.1	+8.4
Registered electors		8,255		
Green gain from Labour Co-op		Swing		
Labour Co-op hold		Swing		

=== Oval ===
Oval (3)
Party	Candidate	Votes	%	±%
Labour Co-op	Claire Holland*	1,424	38.6	−21.2
Labour Co-op	Diogo Costa*	1,413	38.3	−19.4
Labour Co-op	Bryn Scott	1,220	33.1	−20.9
Green	Ola Aralepo	1,120	30.4	+8.9
Green	Callum Bennett	1,083	29.4	+12.8
Green	Dez Germon	1,002	27.2	+11.9
Liberal Democrats	Chris French	709	19.2	+4.4
Liberal Democrats	Blaise Baquiche	656	17.8	+3.6
Liberal Democrats	Pedro Xavier	648	17.6	+6.9
Conservative	Keith Best	290	7.9	−4.6
Conservative	Elizabeth Gibson	272	7.4	−4.7
Conservative	Lottie Moore	248	6.7	−4.2
Reform	Matthew McLean	232	6.3	N/A
Reform	Darren Higgins	229	6.2	N/A
TUSC	Steven Nally	32	0.9	N/A
Turnout		3,689	40.3	+9.7
Registered electors		9,151		
Labour Co-op hold		Swing		
Labour Co-op hold		Swing		
Labour Co-op hold		Swing		

=== St Martin's ===
St Martin's (2)
Party	Candidate	Votes	%	±%
Green	Jeremy Isaacs	1,268	45.3	+25.3
Labour	Georgina Berriman	1,213	43.4	−16.5
Labour	Kitty Ussher	987	35.3	−22.6
Independent	Laura Graham	470	16.8	N/A
Liberal Democrats	Terry Curtis	269	9.6	−0.9
Liberal Democrats	Jackie Harper-Wray	264	9.4	+0.6
Reform	Mark Cunningham	205	7.3	N/A
Conservative	Mark Gilmore	190	6.8	−4.1
Conservative	Andrew West	169	6.0	−4.7
Reform	Goranka Gudelj	141	5.0	N/A
Turnout		2,798	37.9	+8.0
Registered electors		7,384		
Green gain from Labour		Swing		
Labour hold		Swing		

=== Stockwell East ===
Rebecca Spencer was a councillor for Gipsy Hill ward, elected in 2022.

Stockwell East (2)
Party	Candidate	Votes	%	±%
Green	Kevin Brown	875	31.6	+7.8
Liberal Democrats	Tam Langley	850	30.7	+15.8
Labour	Mohammed Hashi *	832	30.1	−22.1
Liberal Democrats	David Whitaker	779	28.2	+15.4
Green	Qaisar Rana	724	26.2	+8.0
Labour	Rebecca Spencer *	712	25.7	−27.8
Reform	Nicholas Maund	156	5.6	N/A
Conservative	Alicia Hollings	144	5.2	−7.0
Conservative	Henrietta Royle	140	5.1	−7.3
TUSC	Berkay Kartav	19	0.7	N/A
Turnout		2,767	39.0	+9.2
Registered electors		7,101		
Green gain from Labour		Swing		
Liberal Democrats gain from Labour		Swing		

=== Stockwell West and Larkhall ===
Stockwell West and Larkhall (3)
Party	Candidate	Votes	%	±%
Labour	Nadia Burrell	1,438	38.7	−23.3
Labour	David Oxley *	1,301	35.0	−22.2
Labour	Joseph Dharampal-Hornby *	1,244	33.5	−29.6
Green	Nicholas Hattersley	1,234	33.2	+15.1
Green	Fawzia Kane	1,211	32.6	+15.9
Green	Neil Sheppeck	1,098	29.6	+18.0
Conservative	James Bellis	420	11.3	−6.7
Liberal Democrats	Ishbel Brown	377	10.2	−0.3
Reform	Lydia Aitcheson	374	10.1	N/A
Conservative	James Hallett	358	9.6	−0.9
Independent	Neila Baiguzhanova	351	9.5	N/A
Liberal Democrats	Sally Mitton	348	9.4	−1.1
Liberal Democrats	Marcia Van-Loo	273	7.4	−1.3
Conservative	Alasdair Johnstone	265	7.1	−3.0
TUSC	Nadia El Yacoubi	72	1.9	−0.9
Socialist (GB)	César Soitillo	68	1.8	N/A
Turnout		3,713	32.2	+5.3
Registered electors		11,516		
Labour hold		Swing		
Labour hold		Swing		
Labour hold		Swing		

=== Streatham Common and Vale ===
Streatham Common and Vale (3)
Party	Candidate	Votes	%	±%
Labour Co-op	Danial Adilypour *	1,469	32.7	−30.5
Labour Co-op	Sarah Cole *	1,362	30.3	25.4
Labour Co-op	Domonic Armstrong *	1,319	29.3	−24.3
Liberal Democrats	Nick Davidson	1,311	29.1	+14.9
Liberal Democrats	Claire Mathys	1,266	28.1	+16.8
Green	Pete Johnson	1,245	27.7	+10.2
Green	Nikki Twallin	1,191	26.5	+11.8
Liberal Democrats	Simon Drage	1,183	26.3	+17.6
Green	Moses Mugenyi	1,161	25.8	+13.1
Conservative	Christopher Henri Cousins	376	8.4	−8.7
Reform	Neil James Bridges	333	7.4	N/A
Conservative	Patrick Liam Fahy	303	6.7	−9.2
Reform	Ruth Moore	290	6.4	N/A
Conservative	Richard Steven Liell	278	6.2	−9.1
TUSC	Candido Della Rocco	60	1.3	N/A
Turnout		4,499	38.9	+10.3
Registered electors		11,570		
Labour Co-op hold		Swing		
Labour Co-op hold		Swing		
Labour Co-op hold		Swing		

=== Streatham Hill East ===
Martin Abrams was a councillor for Streatham St Leonard's ward, elected in 2022.

Streatham Hill East (2)
Party	Candidate	Votes	%	±%
Green	Martin Abrams *	1,333	42.3	+18.1
Green	Amelia Shoebridge	1,270	40.3	+23.9
Labour Co-op	Liz Atkins*	855	27.1	−30.8
Liberal Democrats	Alex Davies	760	24.1	+13.6
Labour Co-op	Rezina Chowdhury*	759	24.1	−31.4
Liberal Democrats	Tobias Ikegbunam	687	21.8	+14.2
Reform	Goran Gligoric	172	5.5	N/A
Conservative	Colin Watkins	144	4.6	−10.0
Conservative	Kwadwo Twum	125	4.0	−9.2
Turnout		3,155	43.7	+12.9
Registered electors		7,215		
Green hold		Swing		
Green gain from Labour		Swing		

=== Streatham Hill West and Thornton ===
Streatham Hill West and Thornton (2)
Party	Candidate	Votes	%	±%
Liberal Democrats	Matthew Bryant *	1,661	47.4	+3.8
Liberal Democrats	Kita Ogden	1,404	40.1	−2.1
Labour	Jane Edbrooke	828	23.6	−18.0
Green	Hugh Johnson	747	21.3	+8.7
Green	Alex Mohabir	715	20.4	+12.7
Labour	Sean McKee	648	18.5	−20.8
Conservative	Paul Mawdsley	287	8.2	+1.1
Conservative	Russell Newall	248	7.1	+1.2
Reform	John Dagger	234	6.7	
Turnout		3,505	44.6	+3.0
Registered electors		7,850		
Liberal Democrats hold		Swing		
Liberal Democrats hold		Swing		

=== Streatham St Leonard's ===
During the campaign, Green Party candidate, Saiqa Ali was suspended from the party following her arrest for alleged antisemitic social media posts.

Streatham St Leonard's (3)
Party	Candidate	Votes	%	±%
Green	Scott Ainslie *	2,242	53.3	+5.7
Green	Alice Weavers	2,037	48.4	+1.0
Green	Saiqa Ali	1,437	34.1	−6.1
Labour	Jade Albás	1,084	25.7	−17.2
Labour	Joe Gibbons	953	22.6	−15.5
Labour	Edwin Sheppard	833	19.8	−17.8
Liberal Democrats	Robert Doyle	726	17.2	+10.5
Liberal Democrats	Alex Frankl	492	11.7	+5.3
Liberal Democrats	Phil Stanier	458	10.9	+5.3
Conservative	Wendy Newall	349	8.3	+0.1
Conservative	Russell Henman	338	8.0	−1.5
Reform	Philip Marshall	320	7.6	N/A
Conservative	Bryan Wilsher	295	7.0	−1.8
Reform	Jonathan Rea	287	6.8	N/A
Reform	Harpreet Singh	263	6.2	N/A
Turnout		4,210	39.2	+5.4
Registered electors		10,736		
Green hold		Swing		
Green hold		Swing		
Green gain from Labour		Swing		

=== Streatham Wells ===
Streatham Wells (2)
Party	Candidate	Votes	%	±%
Liberal Democrats	Judy Best	1,091	35.8	+7.3
Liberal Democrats	Simon Bucknall	1,081	35.5	+13.1
Green	Pauline Mary Robson	898	29.5	+13.2
Green	Des Caldwell	852	28.0	+14.2
Labour	Holly Smith	780	25.6	−23.5
Labour	Ridhwan Omar	735	24.1	−24.9
Reform	Gareth Hughes	167	5.5	+N/A
Conservative	Charles Neville Barton	152	5.0	−5.0
Conservative	Nicholas Martin Robinson	136	4.5	−.5
Turnout		3,047	43.2	+10.8
Registered electors		7,052		
Liberal Democrats gain from Labour Co-op		Swing		
Liberal Democrats gain from Labour Co-op		Swing		

=== Vauxhall ===
Liam Daley was a councillor for Kennington ward, elected in 2022. Tina Valcarcel was a councillor for Stockwell East ward, elected in 2022.

Vauxhall (3)
Party	Candidate	Votes	%	±%
Green	Jacqueline Bond	653	34.1	+10.5
Labour	David Ford	580	30.3	−31.7
Labour	Liam Daley *	572	29.9	−27.5
Green	Nick Christian	536	28.0	+13.5
Labour	Denean Rowe	530	27.7	−26.5
Green	Bernard O'Sullivan	516	26.9	+12.6
Liberal Democrats	Alistair Leigh	445	23.2	+10.2
Liberal Democrats	Tina Valcarcel *	434	22.7	+11.2
Liberal Democrats	Joe Wright	382	19.9	N/A
Reform	Tony Glover	216	11.3	N/A
Conservative	Jamie Tucker	200	10.4	−7.8
Conservative	Thomas Buckland	195	10.2	−6.4
Conservative	Simon Hooberman	166	8.7	−5.8
Turnout		1,915	31.1	
Registered electors		6,156		
Green gain from Labour		Swing		
Labour hold		Swing		
Labour hold		Swing		

=== Waterloo and South Bank ===
Waterloo and South Bank (2)
Party	Candidate	Votes	%	±%
Labour	Ibrahim Dogus *	678	31.7	−8.5
Liberal Democrats	Doug Buist	626	29.3	−7.4
Labour	Oliviero Veneri-Thomas	596	27.9	−15.4
Liberal Democrats	Elin Kingston	594	27.8	−8.9
Green	Celeste Hicks	538	25.1	+14.4
Green	Gay Lee	507	23.7	+12.7
Reform	Adam Anderson	207	9.7	N/A
Reform	Simon Cassey	195	9.1	N/A
Conservative	Oliver Pateman	128	6.0	−5.0
Conservative	Katherine Tack	122	5.7	−4.8
Turnout		2,140	34.7	+2.4
Registered electors		6,160		
Labour hold		Swing		
Liberal Democrats gain from Labour		Swing		

=== West Dulwich ===
West Dulwich (2)
Party	Candidate	Votes	%	±%
Green	Tom Palmer	1,565	38.2	+17.4
Labour Co-op	Judith Cavanagh *	1,474	35.9	−16.6
Green	Stacey Young	1,422	34.7	+17.5
Labour Co-op	Aidan Stimson	1,177	28.7	−21.1
Conservative	Chris Martin	589	14.4	−6.5
Conservative	Jago Brockway	565	13.8	−4.9
Liberal Democrats	Stuart Beadnall	447	10.9	+0.8
Liberal Democrats	Charley Jarrett	360	8.8	−1.1
Reform	Gareth Mitchell	327	8.0	N/A
Turnout		4,102	49.6	+9.3
Registered electors		8,270		
Green gain from Labour Co-op		Swing		
Labour Co-op hold		Swing		

== By-elections ==
=== Clapham Park ===
Clapham Park by-election: 9 July 2026 Resignation of Joanna Eaves (Green)
Party	Candidate	Votes	%	±%
Green	Michael Ball	842	43.8	▲11.6
Labour Co-op	Louie Somerville-Sutherland	799	41.5	▲5.7
Liberal Democrats	Ben Amos	108	5.6	▼4.6
Conservative	Joshua Forrester	85	4.4	▼4.2
Reform	Martin Read	71	3.7	▼2.9
CPA	Jehwo Kehinde	12	0.6	N/A
Socialist (GB)	Anya Krycek	6	0.3	N/A
Majority		43	2.3	N/A
Turnout		1,923	20.1	▼13.0
Registered electors		9,559		
Green hold		Swing	▲3.0	

=== Streatham St Leonard's ===
Streatham St Leonard's by-election: 9 July 2026 Resignation of Saiqa Ali (Independent, elected as Green)
Party	Candidate	Votes	%	±%
Liberal Democrats	Alex Davies	1,161	41.7	▲26.3
Green	Dario Goodwin	972	35.0	▼12.5
Labour	Jade Albas	421	15.1	▼7.9
Conservative	Chris Cousins	119	4.3	▼3.1
Reform	Mark McKee	71	2.6	▼4.2
CPA	Yemi Awolola	37	1.3	N/A
Majority		189	6.7	N/A
Turnout		2,781	25.8	▼13.4
Registered electors		10,791		
Liberal Democrats gain from Green		Swing	▲19.4	

=== Myatt's Fields ===
Myatt's Fields by-election: 8 October 2026 Death of Annie Gallop (Labour Co-op)
Party	Candidate	Votes	%	±%
Labour Co-op	Molly Hartill	1,026	46.7	▲10.3
Green	Sonia Winifred	815	37.1	▼2.0
Liberal Democrats	Chris French	189	8.6	▲1.5
Conservative	John Hinsdon	74	3.4	▼1.8
Reform	Mark McKee	58	2.6	▼2.7
CPA	Yemi Awolola	26	1.2	N/A
Socialist (GB)	Anya Krycek	9	0.4	N/A
Majority		211	9.6	N/A
Turnout		2204	26.3	−10.8
Labour Co-op hold		Swing		
