= Knight's Hill (ward) =

London electoral ward

Coordinates: 51.430°N 0.110°W

- Electoral ward for the Lambeth London Borough Council
- Knight's Hill ward boundaries since 2022
- Borough: Lambeth
- County: Greater London
- Population: 16,535 (2021) (Note: 2021 Census data reported for 2022 ward boundaries)
- Electorate: 11,717 (2022)
- Major settlements: Knight's Hill (West Norwood)
- Area: 1.901 square kilometres (0.734 sq mi)

Current electoral ward
- Created: 1965
- Number of members: 3
- Councillors: Elizabeth Frazer; Lisa Schulkind; Matt Wilcock
- GSS code: E05000424 (2002–2022; E05014106 (2022–present)

Knight's Hill is an electoral ward in the London Borough of Lambeth. The ward has existed since the creation of the borough on 1 April 1965 and was first used in the 1964 elections. It returns three councillors to Lambeth London Borough Council. The boundaries were redrawn in 1978, 2002 and 2022. It covers parts of West Norwood. Notable councillors to represent the ward are Ken Livingstone who became Mayor of London and Ted Knight who was leader of Lambeth Council during the 1985 rate-capping rebellion.

== List of councillors ==
Term	Councillor	Party
1964–1968	H. Lockwood	Labour
1964–1968	J. Fraser	Labour
1964–1968	S. Fagan	Labour
1968–1971	R. Pickard	Conservative
1968–1971	W. Vinnell	Conservative
1968–1971	F. Clark	Conservative
1971–1978	Ken Livingstone	Labour
1971–1974	G. Manning	Labour
1971–1978	D. Prentice	Labour
1974–1978	Ted Knight (Note: Ted Knight was a councillor for Ferndale ward from 1978 to 1986.)	Labour
1978–1982	Kennard Scott-Simpson	Conservative
1978–1982	Margaret Keel	Conservative
1978–1982	Graham Pycock	Conservative
1982–1986	David Bick	Conservative
1982–1990	Ronald Pugh	Conservative
1982–1986	Valerio Bogazzi	Conservative
1986–1994	Simon Fawthrop	Conservative
1986–1994	John Pinniger	Conservative
1990–1996	Peter Evans	Conservative
1994–1998	Hugh Chambers	Conservative
1994–1998	Jonathan Driver	Conservative
1996–2006	Robert McConnell	Liberal Democrats
1998–2002	Paul Connolly	Labour
1998–2002	Colin Crooks	Labour
2002–2006	Geraldine Evans	Liberal Democrats
2002–2006	Jeremy Baker	Liberal Democrats
2006–2026	Jackie Meldrum	Labour
2006–2010	David Malone	Labour
2006–2010	Daniel Fitzpatrick	Labour
2010–2022	Jane Pickard	Labour
2010–2014	Michael Smith	Labour
2014–2024	Sonia Winifred	Labour
2022–2026	Ibtisam Adem	Labour
2024–2026	Emma Nye (Note: Emma Nye was a councillor for Coldharbour ward from 2018 to 2022.)	Labour
2026–present	Elizabeth Frazer	Green
2026–present	Lisa Schulkind	Green
2026–present	Matt Wilcock	Green

== Summary ==
Councillors elected by party at each general borough election.

- Labour
- Conservative
- Liberal Democrats
- Green

== Lambeth council elections since 2022 ==
There was a revision of ward boundaries in Lambeth in 2022. Some territory was transferred to Streatham Hill East and some was gained from Gipsy Hill.

=== 2026 election ===
The election took place on 7 May 2026.

2026 Lambeth London Borough Council election: Knight's Hill
Party	Candidate	Votes	%	±%
Green	Elizabeth Frazer	2,181	45.5	+18.3
Green	Lisa Schulkind	2,118	44.2	+24.7
Green	Matt Wilcock	2,020	42.1	+27.1
Labour	Ibtisam Adem	1,923	40.1	−24.3
Labour	Jackie Meldrum	1,882	39.3	−25.0
Labour	Emma Nye	1,779	37.1	−23.3
Liberal Democrats	Karen Sainsbury	349	7.3	−0.7
Conservative	Gregory Ellis	342	7.1	−2.9
Reform	Charles Holt	320	6.7	N/A
Liberal Democrats	Fareed Alderechi	314	6.5	−0.5
Conservative	Sarah Roberts	311	6.5	−3.2
Reform	Tacita McCoy-Parkhill	287	6.0	N/A
Liberal Democrats	Nicholas Sanders	283	5.9	+0.3
Conservative	Michael Llewelyn-Jones	275	5.7	−3.4
Turnout		4,948	41.8	+10.2
Registered electors		11,835		
Green gain from Labour				
Green gain from Labour				
Green gain from Labour				

=== 2024 by-election ===
The by-election was held on 2 May 2024, following the resignation of Sonia Winifred. It took place on the same day as the 2024 London mayoral election, the 2024 London Assembly election and 14 other borough council by-elections across London.

2024 Knight's Hill by-election
Party	Candidate	Votes	%	±%
Labour	Emma Nye	2,677	55.5	▼6.8
Green	Victoria Evans	983	20.4	▲0.7
Conservative	Leila Yassen	530	11.0	▲1.5
Liberal Democrats	Nicholas Sanders	378	7.8	▲1.7
Independent	Janet Gayle	210	4.4	N/A
Majority		1,694		
Turnout		4,826	40.8	▲9.2
Labour hold		Swing		

=== 2022 election ===
The election took place on 5 May 2022.

2022 Lambeth London Borough Council election: Knight's Hill
Party	Candidate	Votes	%	±%
Labour	Ibtisam Adem	2,317	64.4	
Labour	Jackie Meldrum	2,314	64.3	
Labour	Sonia Winifred	2,171	60.4	
Green	Torla Evans	977	27.2	
Green	Lewis Heather	701	19.5	
Green	Paul Rocks	538	15.0	
Conservative	Joyce Chieke	358	10.0	
Conservative	Luke Hutson	348	9.7	
Conservative	Anthony Kimm	329	9.1	
Liberal Democrats	Ishbel Brown	286	8.0	
Liberal Democrats	Claire Mathys	251	7.0	
Liberal Democrats	Oliver Moule	201	5.6	
Turnout		3,707	31.6	
Labour win (new boundaries)				
Labour win (new boundaries)				
Labour win (new boundaries)				

== 2002–2022 Lambeth council elections ==
Knight's Hill ward boundaries from 2002 to 2022

There was a revision of ward boundaries in Lambeth in 2002.

=== 2018 election ===
The election took place on 3 May 2018.

2018 Lambeth London Borough Council election: Knight's Hill
Party	Candidate	Votes	%	±%
Labour	Jane Pickard	2,378	66.4	
Labour	Jackie Meldrum	2,326	64.9	
Labour	Sonia Winifred	2,033	56.8	
Green	Torla Evans	637	17.8	
Green	Robert Threadgold	504	14.1	
Green	Duncan Eastoe	441	12.3	
Conservative	Shirley Cosgrave	425	11.9	
Conservative	Raymond Walker	414	11.6	
Conservative	Edward Watkins	362	9.4	
Liberal Democrats	Jeremy Baker	345	9.6	
Liberal Democrats	Shiraz Engineer	247	6.9	
Liberal Democrats	Liz Maffei	230	6.4	
Turnout		3,589	34.6	
Labour hold		Swing		
Labour hold		Swing		
Labour hold		Swing		

=== 2014 election ===
The election took place on 22 May 2014.

2014 Lambeth London Borough Council election: Knight's Hill
Party	Candidate	Votes	%	±%
Labour	Jackie Meldrum	2,182	60.4	
Labour	Jane Pickard	2,169		
Labour	Sonia Winifred	1,911		
Conservative	Julia Belgrove	468	13.0	
Green	Nicholas Giannissis	457	12.7	
Conservative	Tim Collins	442		
Green	Lianna Etkind	388		
Conservative	Tony Kimm	382		
Green	Hugo Estevez	365		
Liberal Democrats	Robert Hardware	256	7.1	
UKIP	Helena Kowalska	249	6.9	
Liberal Democrats	Libby Calton	238		
Liberal Democrats	Julian Heather	202		
Total votes		9,709		
Labour hold		Swing		
Labour hold		Swing		
Labour hold		Swing		

=== 2010 election ===
The election on 6 May 2010 took place on the same day as the United Kingdom general election.

2010 Lambeth London Borough Council election: Knight's Hill
Party	Candidate	Votes	%	±%
Labour	Jackie Meldrum	3,039		
Labour	Jane Pickard	2,900		
Labour	Michael Smith	2,768		
Liberal Democrats	Timothy Barnsley	1,480		
Liberal Democrats	Malgorzata Baker	1,430		
Liberal Democrats	James Fitzgerald	1,415		
Conservative	Betty Evans-Jacas	942		
Conservative	Nicholas Rogers	926		
Conservative	Luke Tryl	809		
Green	Kirsty Neal	420		
Green	Alexis Fidgett	378		
Green	Nicholas Giannissis	357		
Total votes		16,864		
Labour hold		Swing		
Labour hold		Swing		
Labour hold		Swing		

=== 2006 election ===
The election took place on 4 May 2006.

2006 Lambeth London Borough Council election: Knight's Hill
Party	Candidate	Votes	%	±%
Labour	Jackie Meldrum	1,358	37.9	
Labour	David Malone	1,352		
Labour	Daniel Fitzpatrick	1,349		
Liberal Democrats	Geraldine Evans	1,273	35.6	
Liberal Democrats	Jeremy Baker	1,218		
Liberal Democrats	Saleha Jaffer	1,116		
Green	Joseph Healy	514	14.4	
Conservative	Nicholas van der Borgh	435	12.2	
Conservative	Sheila Calder	426		
Conservative	Jane Hill	417		
Total votes		9,458		
Labour gain from Liberal Democrats		Swing		
Labour gain from Liberal Democrats		Swing		
Labour gain from Liberal Democrats		Swing		

=== 2002 election ===
The election took place on 2 May 2002.

2002 Lambeth London Borough Council election: Knight's Hill
Party	Candidate	Votes	%	±%
Liberal Democrats	Geraldine Evans	1,331	17.2	
Liberal Democrats	Robert McConnell	1,263	16.3	
Liberal Democrats	Jeremy Baker	1,260	16.2	
Labour	Tony Grayling	949	12.2	
Labour	Bill Watling	926	11.9	
Labour	Robert Hill	908	11.7	
Conservative	Martin Ball	258	3.3	
Green	Graham Jones	251	3.2	
Conservative	Jessica Lee	250	3.2	
Conservative	Christine Hemmise	245	3.2	
Socialist Alliance	Leslie Watson	113	1.5	
Turnout		7,754	27.4	
Liberal Democrats win (new boundaries)				
Liberal Democrats win (new boundaries)				
Liberal Democrats win (new boundaries)				

== 1978–2002 Lambeth council elections ==
Knight's Hill ward boundaries from 1978 to 2002

There was a revision of ward boundaries in Lambeth in 1978.

=== 1998 election ===
The election took place on 7 May 1998.

1998 Lambeth London Borough Council election: Knight's Hill
Party	Candidate	Votes	%	±%
Turnout				
	Labour gain from Conservative	Swing		
	Labour gain from Conservative	Swing		
	Liberal Democrats gain from Conservative	Swing		

=== 1996 by-election ===
The by-election took place on 27 March 1996, following the resignation of Peter Evans.

=== 1994 election ===
The election took place on 5 May 1994.

1994 Lambeth London Borough Council election: Knight's Hill
Party	Candidate	Votes	%	±%
Turnout				
	Conservative hold	Swing		
	Conservative hold	Swing		
	Conservative hold	Swing		

=== 1990 election ===
The election took place on 3 May 1990.

1990 Lambeth London Borough Council election: Knight's Hill
Party	Candidate	Votes	%	±%
Turnout				
	Conservative hold	Swing		
	Conservative hold	Swing		
	Conservative hold	Swing		

=== 1986 election ===
The election took place on 8 May 1986.

1986 Lambeth London Borough Council election: Knight's Hill
Party	Candidate	Votes	%	±%
Turnout				
	Conservative hold	Swing		
	Conservative hold	Swing		
	Conservative hold	Swing		

=== 1982 election ===
The election took place on 6 May 1982.

1982 Lambeth London Borough Council election: Knight's Hill
Party	Candidate	Votes	%	±%
Turnout				
	Conservative hold	Swing		
	Conservative hold	Swing		
	Conservative hold	Swing		

=== 1978 election ===
The election took place on 4 May 1978.

1978 Lambeth London Borough Council election: Knight's Hill
Party	Candidate	Votes	%	±%
Turnout				
	Conservative win (new boundaries)			
	Conservative win (new boundaries)			
	Conservative win (new boundaries)			

== 1964–1978 Lambeth council elections ==
External image
- Knight's Hill ward boundaries from 1965 to 1978

Knight's Hill ward has existed since the creation of the London Borough of Lambeth on 1 April 1965. For elections to the Greater London Council, the ward was part of the Lambeth electoral division from 1965 and then the Norwood division from 1973.

=== 1974 election ===
The election took place on 2 May 1974.

1974 Lambeth London Borough Council election: Knight's Hill
Party	Candidate	Votes	%	±%
Labour	Ken Livingstone	2,115		
Labour	Ted Knight	1,998		
Labour	D. Prentice	1,909		
Conservative	J. Farrall	1,506		
Conservative	J. Foreman-Peck	1,465		
Conservative	L. Foreman-Peck	1,461		
Liberal	S. Mellor	382		
Liberal	G. Chattoe	327		
Liberal	J. Noyes	313		
Turnout				
Labour hold		Swing		
Labour hold		Swing		
Labour hold		Swing		

=== 1971 election ===
The election took place on 13 May 1971.

1971 Lambeth London Borough Council election: Knight's Hill
Party	Candidate	Votes	%	±%
Labour	Ken Livingstone	2,905		
Labour	G. Manning	2,881		
Labour	D. Prentice	2,813		
Conservative	J. Johnstone	1,967		
Conservative	L. Burton	1,937		
Conservative	W. Vinnell	1,922		
Liberal	M. Drake	236		
Liberal	A. Wagman	226		
Liberal	T. Barker	220		
Turnout				
Labour gain from Conservative		Swing		
Labour gain from Conservative		Swing		
Labour gain from Conservative		Swing		

=== 1968 election ===
The election took place on 9 May 1968.

1968 Lambeth London Borough Council election: Knight's Hill
Party	Candidate	Votes	%	±%
Conservative	R. Pickard	2,724		
Conservative	W. Vinnell	2,676		
Conservative	F. Clark	2,650		
Labour	H. Lockwood	1,519		
Labour	G. Manning	1,443		
Labour	J. Wheeler	1,396		
Liberal	E. Hawthorne	450		
Liberal	A. Wagman	436		
Liberal	R. Rawcliffe	406		
Communist	C. Hoyle	128		
Turnout				
Conservative gain from Labour		Swing		
Conservative gain from Labour		Swing		
Conservative gain from Labour		Swing		

=== 1964 election ===
The election took place on 7 May 1964.

1964 Lambeth London Borough Council election: Knight's Hill
Party	Candidate	Votes	%	±%
Labour	H. Lockwood	2,070	56.1	
Labour	J. Fraser	2,055		
Labour	S. Fagan	2,036		
Conservative	B. High	1,621	43.9	
Conservative	P. Cory	1,617		
Conservative	W. Vinnell	1,603		
Turnout		3,729	31.1	
Labour win (new seat)				
Labour win (new seat)				
Labour win (new seat)				
