= Steve Reed (politician) =

British politician (born 1963)

The Right Honourable Steve Reed OBE MP
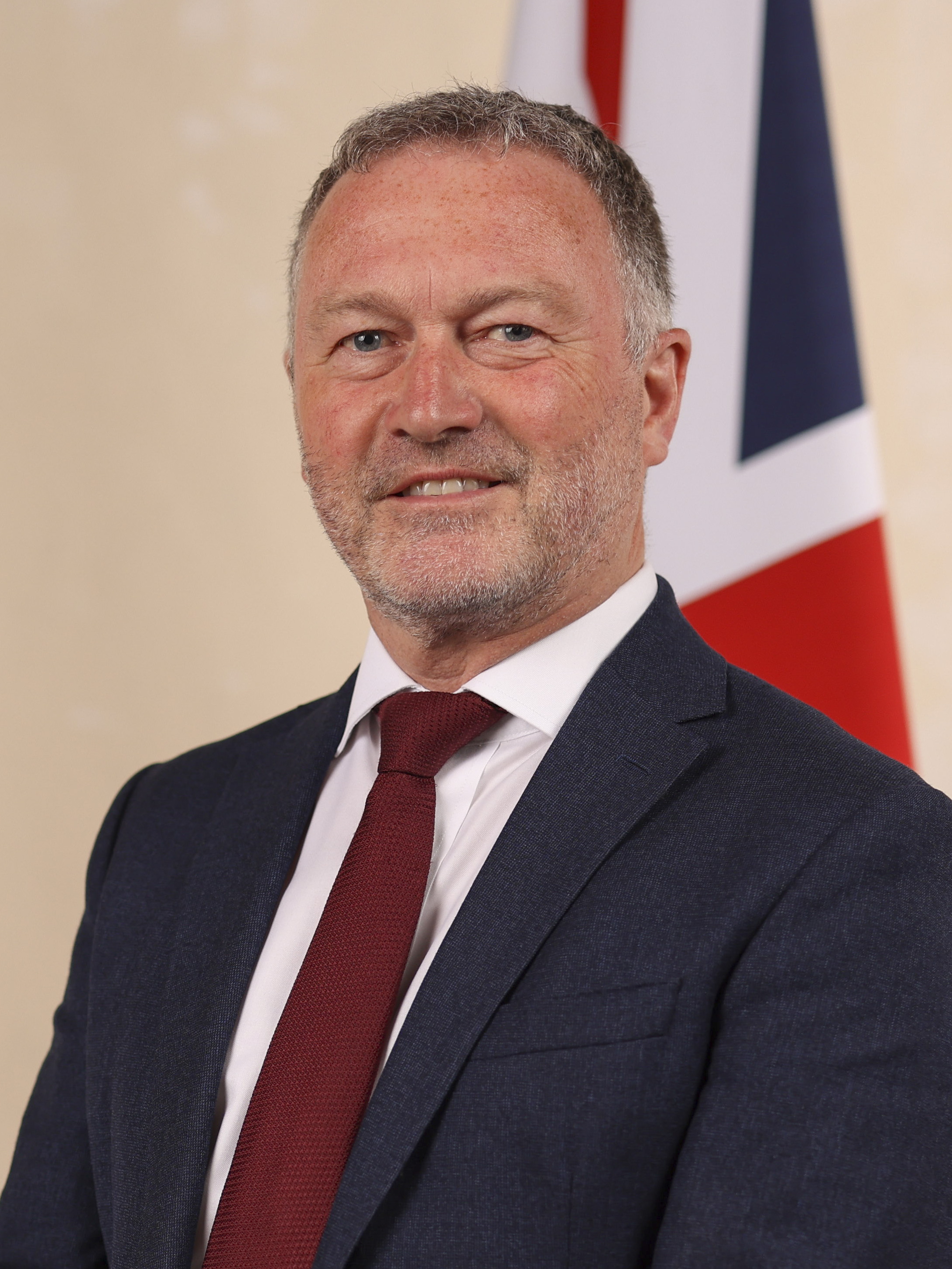
- Official portrait, 2024

Secretary of State for Housing, Communities and Local Government
- In office 5 September 2025 – 20 July 2026
- Prime Minister: Keir Starmer
- Preceded by: Angela Rayner
- Succeeded by: Angela Rayner

Secretary of State for Environment, Food and Rural Affairs
- In office 5 July 2024 – 5 September 2025
- Prime Minister: Keir Starmer
- Preceded by: Steve Barclay
- Succeeded by: Emma Reynolds

Member of Parliament for Streatham and Croydon North Croydon North (2012–2024)
- Incumbent
- Assumed office 29 November 2012
- Preceded by: Malcolm Wicks
- Majority: 15,603 (35.0%)
Shadow portfolios
Shadow Secretary of State
2023–2024	Environment, Food and Rural Affairs
2021–2023	Justice
2020–2021	Communities and Local Government
Shadow Minister
2019–2020	Children and Families
2016–2019	Civil Society
2015–2016	Local Government
2013–2015	Crime Prevention

Leader of Lambeth Council
- In office 24 May 2006 – 29 November 2012
- Preceded by: Peter Truesdale
- Succeeded by: Lib Peck

Member of Lambeth Council for Brixton Hill Town Hall (1998–2002)
- In office 7 May 1998 – 29 November 2012

Personal details
- Born: Steven Mark Ward Reed; 12 November 1963 (age 62) St Albans, Hertfordshire, England
- Party: Labour Co-op
- Education: University of Sheffield (BA, MA)
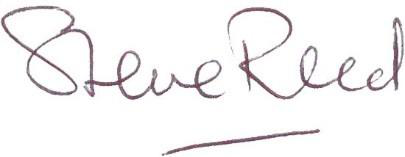
- Signature
- Website: Official website

Steven Mark Ward Reed (born 12 November 1963) is a British politician who served as Secretary of State for Environment, Food and Rural Affairs from 2024 to 2025 and as Secretary of State for Housing, Communities and Local Government from September 2025 to July 2026. A member of the Labour and Co-operative Party, he has been the Member of Parliament (MP) for Streatham and Croydon North, formerly Croydon North, since 2012.

Born in St Albans, Reed was educated at Verulam School and then studied English at Sheffield University. In 1990, he began his career in the educational publishing industry, and worked for Routledge, Thomson Corporation, the Law Society and Sweet & Maxwell. Having joined the Labour party aged 16, he was elected for his party to the London Borough of Lambeth council in the 1998 election. After Labour lost control of the council in the 2002 election, Reed became the leader of the opposition. Following the 2006 election in which Labour regained control, he was appointed the leader of the council, serving until 2012. Reed unsuccessfully sought the Labour nomination for the Streatham constituency seat in 2008. He was appointed an Officer of the Order of the British Empire (OBE) in the 2013 Birthday Honours for services to local government.

Reed was elected to Parliament for Croydon North in the 2012 by-election. The following year, he was appointed shadow minister for crime reduction under Ed Miliband. Reed continued to serve in the frontbench under Jeremy Corbyn before resigning in 2016 in protest against Corbyn's leadership. He supported Owen Smith in a failed attempt to replace Corbyn before returning to serve under him in October 2016. Reed was the shadow minister for civil society from 2016 to 2019 and then the shadow minister for children and families from 2019 to 2020. After the election of Keir Starmer as leader, he was promoted to the shadow cabinet as shadow communities and local government secretary. He became shadow justice secretary in 2021 before he was appointed shadow environment secretary in a 2023 reshuffle.

Following Labour's victory in the 2024 general election, Reed joined the government and was appointed Secretary of State for Environment, Food and Rural Affairs in the Starmer cabinet. In the 2025 cabinet reshuffle, he was appointed Secretary of State for Housing, Communities and Local Government. Reed left the government following the appointment of Andy Burnham as prime minister in 2026.

== Early life and career ==
Reed was born on 12 November 1963, and raised in St Albans, Hertfordshire, and attended Verulam School. At 16 he joined the Labour Party. His family worked at Odhams printing factory in Watford until it closed down in 1983. He studied English at Sheffield University. He started work in the educational publishing industry in 1990, and worked for Routledge, Thomson Corporation, the Law Society and Sweet & Maxwell.

== Local government career (1998–2012) ==
=== Elections and tenure ===
Reed first stood for the London Borough of Lambeth in the 1998 election and won the Town Hall ward (now Brixton Acre Lane ward). In 2002, Labour lost control of Lambeth Council to a Liberal Democrat/Conservative coalition, and Reed was elected leader of the opposition.

After Labour won back control of Lambeth Council in 2006, Reed was appointed the council's leader. At the beginning of his tenure, after Labour took political control of the council, Lambeth was rated as London's worst-run borough, with a one-star rating in the Audit Commission's annual inspection in 2006. By 2009 the council had improved to a three-star rating. At the 2010 election, Labour gained seats from the Liberal Democrats and Conservatives, making it the first time that Labour had been re-elected to lead in Lambeth for twenty years.

=== Positions ===
Reed held a number of significant positions in local government. He was:

- Deputy Leader of Local Government Labour, an association representing Labour councillors nationally;
- Deputy Chairman of the Local Government Association;
- London Councils board member for Children's Services and Employment;
- Chairman of Central London Forward, a lobbying group representing five inner-London boroughs;
- A board member representing London's boroughs on the London Enterprise Partnership;
- Co-chair of the Vauxhall-Nine Elms-Battersea regeneration board;
- Chairman of the London Young People's Education and Skills Board;
- A member of the London Board of the Homes and Communities Agency between 2009 and 2011

=== Policies and recognition ===
While a member of Lambeth Council, Steve Reed introduced a scheme to "Name and Shame" users of recreational drugs. In an interview with the Daily Mirror recounting this, he stated, "We wanted to send out the signal that, if you think it's acceptable to come and buy drugs here, and leave behind you the trail of destruction the drugs trade causes on our streets, we will do everything we can to stop you and we will let your friends, family and employers know what you've done." He also indicated that a Labour government would be willing to look at implementing this policy nationwide.

In May 2010, Reed launched a consultation on plans to turn Lambeth into the country's first co-operative council intending to deliver better services more cost-effectively by giving more control to communities and service users, reported in The Guardian newspaper as a possible new model for Labour in local government. The final report of Lambeth Council's Cooperative Council Commission laid out the plans for achieving this objective and Lambeth Council put a transformation plan into effect.

Reed was reported to the Standards Board by a Conservative councillor after he disclosed that she was barred from voting on financial matters because of her refusal to pay council tax on one of her properties for several years. This information was legally disclosable and no sanction was imposed.

Reed was named one of the three most influential council leaders in the country by the Local Government Chronicle in 2011 and was the highest-ranked Labour politician in the 2010 Pink List compiled by The Independent on Sunday.

== Parliamentary career ==
=== Selection ===
Reed's first attempt to enter Parliament was in Lambeth, contesting the Labour nomination for the Streatham constituency in 2008, on the retirement of Keith Hill. In March of that year, Reed was beaten to the nomination by Chuka Umunna.

On 3 November 2012, Reed defeated former Croydon Council leader Val Shawcross by three votes to become the Labour candidate for Croydon North. The by-election followed the death of the former Labour MP for Croydon North Malcolm Wicks, and was won by Reed on 29 November 2012.

=== In opposition ===
==== Miliband frontbench (2013–2015) ====
In October 2013, Reed was appointed a Shadow Home Office Minister by the Labour leader Ed Miliband.

In the 2015 general election, Reed was re-elected with 33,513 votes (a 62.5% share, up 6.6% from the previous general election in 2010) and a majority of 21,364 (39.9%) with a 62.3% turnout.

==== Under Corbyn (2015–2020) ====
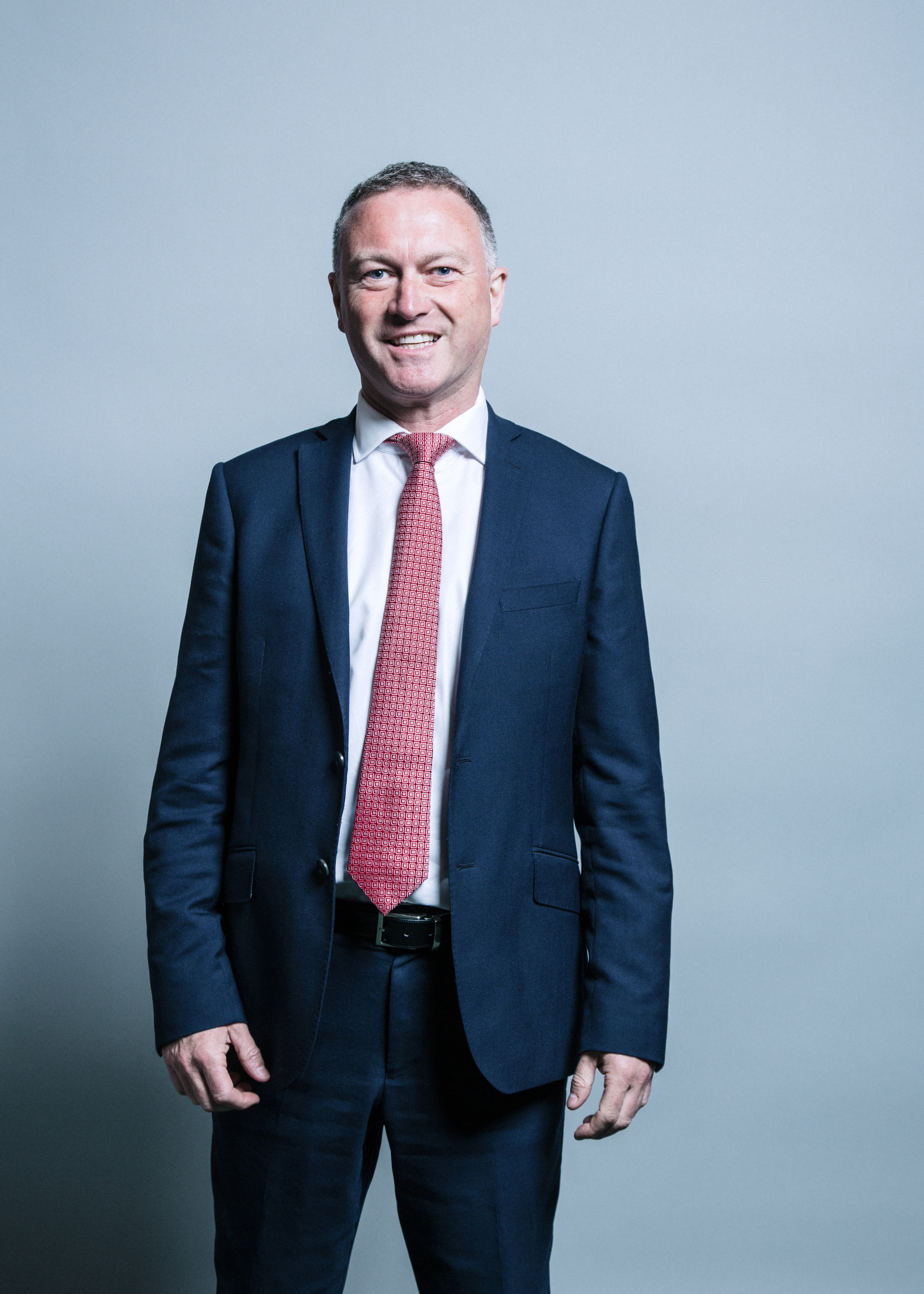
Official portrait, 2017

Under Jeremy Corbyn, Reed became Shadow Minister for Local Government.

On 27 June 2016, Reed resigned as Shadow Minister for Local Government as part of the mass resignation of the Labour Shadow Cabinet against Jeremy Corbyn's leadership of the Labour party. He supported Owen Smith in the 2016 Labour leadership election.

In June 2018, Reed attempted to get a bill through Parliament to make hospitals reveal details about how and when they use physical force against patients and provide hospital staff with training about unconscious bias against minority groups such as young black men with mental health problems. Reed referred to the death of his constituent, Olaseni Lewis, aged 23 during use of restraint at Bethlem hospital. A filibuster by Conservative MP Philip Davies prevented the bill succeeding. Reed's bill was passed on 6 July 2018; it requires that police attending mental hospitals to apply restraints must wear body cameras.

==== Shadow cabinet (2020–2024) ====
In April 2020, Keir Starmer appointed him shadow Secretary of State for Communities and Local Government.

In July 2020, Reed published a tweet labelling the businessman Richard Desmond a "puppet-master", said to be an antisemitic trope. He apologised and deleted the tweet after he found out Desmond was Jewish. Jewish Conservative MP Andrew Percy said "Alluding to Jews as puppet-masters is an age old antisemitic trope and for a Shadow Cabinet member to use this trope is totally unacceptable." Reed, who has described himself as a Zionist, subsequently spoke of his longstanding commitment to Labour Friends of Israel.

In the November 2021 shadow cabinet reshuffle, he was appointed Shadow Secretary of State for Justice and Shadow Lord Chancellor.

On 4 September 2023, Keir Starmer appointed Reed as Shadow Secretary of State for Environment, Food and Rural Affairs.

He was elected as MP for the new constituency of Streatham and Croydon North in the 2024 general election, and was appointed as Secretary of State for Environment, Food and Rural Affairs.

=== In government ===
==== Environment secretary (2024–2025) ====
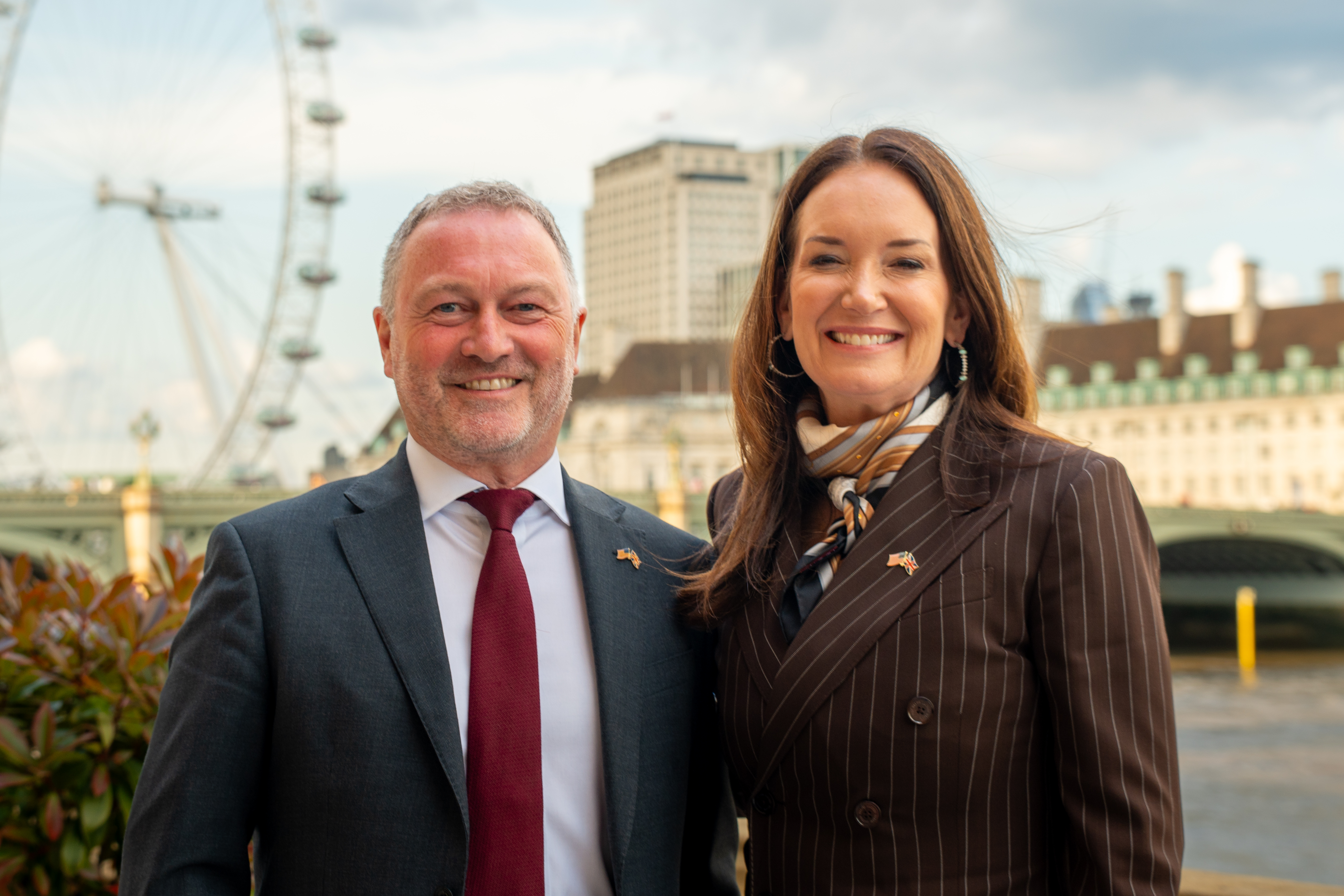
Reed with United States Agriculture secretary Brooke Rollins in May 2025

During the 2024 general election, Reed stated that a Labour government would oversee "the biggest boost in animal welfare in a generation", including a ban on trail hunting, puppy farming, and snare traps, an end to animal testing and the badger cull, and a prohibition on importing food items that violate UK production standards, like foie gras. During Common Veterinary Area negotiations in February 2025, a Department for Environment, Food and Rural Affairs spokesperson refused to say whether the government remained committed to banning foie gras imports. In July 2025, Reed and Labour were criticised by UK animal campaigners for failing to advance their promised animal welfare policies, as well as removing protections against chickens being carried by their legs.

In December 2025, Reed's successor Emma Reynolds announced the government's updated animal welfare strategy, which included a ban on trail hunting, snare traps, and puppy farming, a phaseout of farrowing crates for pigs and colony cages for egg-laying hens, and new humane slaughter standards for pigs and fish.

When the government's controversial changes to farmers' inheritance tax exemption rules were first announced, he claimed that they "would not impact the vast majority of farm businesses". However, a few months later, he acknowledged that even if "no farms were going bust today because of the budget, that could change once the policy takes effect next year."

==== Housing secretary (2025–2026) ====
Reed was appointed Housing Secretary on 5 September 2025, by telephone call from the Prime Minister, while Reed was at home.

As Secretary of State for Housing, Communities and Local Government, Reed stated the Government's opposition to the adoption of a four day working week by South Cambridgeshire District Council and local councils in general, saying that the four day week may be seen as an indicator of potential council failure.

Reed announced on 11 January 2026 that as Secretary of State he and the Government, could take action against local Councils that adopt foreign policy positions above local community needs, including the adoption of Boycott, Divestment and Sanctions. Council leaders would be required to adhere to this policy.

In January 2026, Reed gave permission for 30 English councils to postpone elections in May 2026, arguing it was due to a forthcoming local government reorganisation causing some councils to doubt their capacity to run the polls. All the major opposition political parties criticised this decision as denying electors a vote, in which Labour was likely to do poorly in. Reform UK leader Nigel Farage commenced a legal action in the High Court against the postponement. Three days before the court case, the government withdrew the original decision saying it was "following legal advice", requiring the elections to take place. The government will pay Reform UK's legal costs.

After the appointment of Andy Burnham as prime minister on 20 July 2026, Reed left government in anticipation of the formation of the Burnham ministry and subsequently returned to the backbenches.

== Personal life ==
Reed is gay and married his partner in July 2022. He is a Christian.

== Honours ==
Reed was appointed Officer of the Order of the British Empire (OBE) in the 2013 Birthday Honours for services to local government.

Reed was sworn as a member of the Privy Council on 10 July 2024, entitling him to be styled "The Right Honourable" for life.

Parliament of the United Kingdom
Preceded by Malcolm Wicks	Member of Parliament for Croydon North; 2012–2024	Constituency abolished
New constituency	Member of Parliament for Streatham and Croydon North; 2024–present	Incumbent
Political offices
Preceded by Steve Barclay	Secretary of State for Environment, Food and Rural Affairs; 2024–2025	Succeeded by Emma Reynolds
Preceded by Angela Rayner	Secretary of State for Housing, Communities and Local Government; 2025–2026	Succeeded by Angela Rayner
