= 1998 Lambeth London Borough Council election =

- 7 May 1998

All 64 seats up for election to Lambeth London Borough Council 33 seats needed for a majority
- Registered: 183,447
- Turnout: 58,937, 32.13% (▼10.88)

	First party	Second party
Party	Labour	Liberal Democrats
Last election	'24 seats, 36.37%	24 seats, 11.36%
Seats before	23	25
Seats won	41	18
Seat change	▲18	▼7
Popular vote	71,112	48,857
Percentage	45.35%	31.16%
Swing	▲8.98	▼2.35
	Third party	Fourth party
Party	Conservative	Independent
Last election	16 seats, 26.35%	0 seats, 0.21%
Seats before	15	1
Seats won	5	0
Seat change	▼10	▼1
Popular vote	28,855	821
Percentage	18.40%	0.52
Swing	▼7.95	▲0.31
Council control before election
Labour
Council control after election
Labour

Elections to Lambeth London Borough Council were held on 7 May 1998. The whole council was up for election and the Labour Party took overall control of the council.

== Election result ==
Lambeth local election result 1998
Party	Seats	Gains	Losses	Net gain/loss	Seats %	Votes %	Votes	+/−
Labour	41	18	0	▲18	64.06	45.35	71,112	▲8.98
Liberal Democrats	18	3	10	▼7	28.13	31.16	48,857	▼2.35
Conservative	5	0	10	▼10	7.81	18.40	28,855	▼7.95
Green	0	0	0	Steady	0.00	3.42	5,357	▲1.80
Independent Democrat	0	0	0	Steady	0.00	0.67	1,058	▼0.77
Independent	0	0	1	▼1	0.00	0.52	821	▲0.31
Socialist Alliance	0	0	0	Steady	0.00	0.24	373	New
Socialist (GB)	0	0	0	Steady	0.00	0.11	166	New
Tenants and Residents	0	0	0	Steady	0.00	0.09	144	New
Communist	0	0	0	Steady	0.00	0.04	59	▲0.02
Total	64						156,802	

== Ward results ==
(*) - Indicates an incumbent candidate

(†) - Indicates an incumbent candidate standing in a different ward

=== Angell ===
Angell (3)
Party	Candidate	Votes	%	±%
Labour	Ambrose Hogan	946	48.43	▲3.64
Labour	Donatus Anyanwu	906		
Labour	Simon Stevens	887		
Independent Democrat	Thomas Butler	315	15.74	▼7.14
Independent Democrat	Raymond Woolford	301		
Independent Democrat	Andrew Morris	274		
Liberal Democrats	Alan Bevan^{†} (Note: Bevan was a sitting councillor representing the Stockwell ward)	229	10.63	▼8.35
Green	Albere Hanna	197	10.45	▲2.73
Liberal Democrats	Manjula Roy	194		
Liberal Democrats	Richard Laming	178		
Conservative	Michael Angel	134		
Conservative	Sheila Angel	134	6.58	▲0.95
Conservative	Robert Angel	104		
Independent	Alexander Owolade	95	5.04	New
Communist	Peter Clifford	59	3.13	New
Registered electors		7,553		▲172
Turnout		1,869	24.75	▼11.37
Rejected ballots		18	0.96	▲0.73
Labour hold				
Labour hold				
Labour hold				

=== Bishop's ===
Bishop's (3)
Party	Candidate	Votes	%	±%
Liberal Democrats	Peter Truesdale*	1,033	38.81	▼18.13
Labour	Leslie Boodram	1,011	38.93	▲5.14
Labour	Stephen Terence	1,011		
Liberal Democrats	Catriona Moore	977		
Liberal Democrats	Gilbert Williams*	941		
Labour	David Smith	938		
Green	Vahe Bastajian	175	6.90	New
Conservative	Barbara Winbourne	151	5.58	▲0.82
Tenants and Residents	John Howard	144	5.68	New
Conservative	Kenneth Graham	140		
Conservative	Avril Firman	133		
Independent	Nigelle de Bar	58	2.29	New
Independent	Simeon Fuller	46	1.81	New
Registered electors		7,889		▲700
Turnout		2,462	31.21	▼11.87
Rejected ballots		13	0.53	▲0.47
Liberal Democrats hold				
Labour gain from Liberal Democrats				
Labour gain from Liberal Democrats				

=== Clapham Park ===
Clapham Park (3)
Party	Candidate	Votes	%	±%
Labour	Ruth Ling*	1,527	44.55	▲6.01
Labour	Roland Doven	1,392		
Labour	Martin McEwan	1,378		
Liberal Democrats	Darren Sanders	1,154	34.00	▲9.77
Liberal Democrats	Matthew Bryant	1,120		
Liberal Democrats	Clive Gross	1,005		
Conservative	Richard Bassett	698	21.45	▼15.79
Conservative	Gianfranco Letizia	691		
Conservative	Richard Forsdyke	680		
Registered electors		9,585		▲665
Turnout		3,506	36.58	▼7.95
Rejected ballots		38	1.08	▲1.03
Labour hold				
Labour hold				
Labour hold				

=== Clapham Town ===
Clapham Town (3)
Party	Candidate	Votes	%	±%
Labour	Christopher Henley	1,382	41.33	▲4.46
Labour	Michael English*	1,268		
Labour	Claudette Hewitt	1,240		
Conservative	Bernard Gentry*	1,194	34.47	▼1.59
Conservative	John Swannick	1,026		
Conservative	David Green	1,025		
Green	Ben Hardy	430	13.70	New
Liberal Democrats	Maria Gardner-Brown	395	10.50	▼16.58
Liberal Democrats	Malcolm Baines	310		
Liberal Democrats	Maureen Mele	283		
Registered electors		8,863		▲678
Turnout		3,076	34.71	▼11.26
Rejected ballots		8	0.26	▲0.13
Labour hold				
Labour gain from Conservative				
Labour hold				

=== Ferndale ===
Ferndale (3)
Party	Candidate	Votes	%	±%
Labour	Richard Jarman	1,176	53.83	▲2.54
Labour	Mohammed Abu-Bakr* (Note: Abu-Bakr was elected in a by-election triggered by the resignations of Cllrs Cooper-King and Harrison in 1995. He was elected alongside Simon Adams who did not stand for re-election.)	1,153		
Labour	Paul McGlone	1,115		
Liberal Democrats	Patrick Mitchell	357	14.66	▼9.00
Green	Penelope Shepherd	302	14.16	▲3.41
Liberal Democrats	John Medway	294		
Liberal Democrats	Pavel Pinkava	287		
Conservative	Alison Davis	244	9.47	▼1.50
Conservative	Andrew Calder	181		
Conservative	Sheila Calder	181		
Independent Democrat	Earl Simms	168	7.88	▲4.55
Registered electors		9,451		▲818
Turnout		2,084	22.05	▼11.06
Rejected ballots		43	2.06	▲1.85
Labour hold				
Labour hold				
Labour hold				

=== Gipsy Hill ===
Gipsy Hill (3)
Party	Candidate	Votes	%	±%
Conservative	Janet Grigg*	1,525	46.04	▲4.56
Conservative	Russell A'Court	1,338		
Conservative	Gareth Compton	1,330		
Labour	John Fraser	1,311	38.23	▲3.78
Labour	Neil Semple	1,110		
Labour	Philip Smith	1,061		
Green	David Goodman	265	8.73	▲2.21
Liberal Democrats	Timothy Evans	234	7.00	▼11.02
Liberal Democrats	Andrew Thurburn	212		
Liberal Democrats	Roger Stewart	191		
Registered electors		8,760		▲64
Turnout		3,133	35.76	▼8.59
Rejected ballots		15	0.48	▲0.45
Conservative hold				
Conservative hold				
Conservative hold				

=== Herne Hill ===
Herne Hill (3)
Party	Candidate	Votes	%	±%
Labour	James Dickson*	1,415	48.48	▲4.75
Labour	Kirsty McHugh	1,359		
Labour	Peter O'Connell*	1,170		
Conservative	Evan Davies	564	18.72	▼14.28
Conservative	Lewis Robinson	500		
Liberal Democrats	Andrew Bennett	464	13.33	▲1.09
Conservative	Shah Isfahan	459		
Green	Timothy Mather	387	14.27	▲4.94
Liberal Democrats	Diane Grigsby	344		
Liberal Democrats	Dave Raval	276		
Socialist Alliance	William Hynes	141	5.20	New
Registered electors		8,376		▲684
Turnout		2,546	30.40	▲16.05
Rejected ballots		19	0.75	▲0.55
Labour hold				
Labour hold				
Labour hold				

=== Knight's Hill ===
Knight's Hill (3)
Party	Candidate	Votes	%	±%
Labour	Paul Connolly	1,554	41.09	▲7.81
Labour	Colin Crooks	1,275		
Liberal Democrats	Robert McConnell* (Note: McConnell was elected in a by-election triggered by the resignation of Cllr Evans in 1996)	1,238	35.24	▲13.24
Labour	Netti Williams	1,180		
Liberal Democrats	Morris Martin	1,128		
Liberal Democrats	Joel Robinson	1,072		
Conservative	Nathalie Ray	602	17.95	▼26.78
Conservative	Thomas Shaw	581		
Conservative	Graeme Tennyson	568		
Green	John Parham	186	5.72	New
Registered electors		9,278		▲121
Turnout		3,447	37.15	▼5.06
Rejected ballots		15	0.44	▲0.28
Labour gain from Conservative				
Labour gain from Conservative				
Liberal Democrats hold				

=== Larkhall ===
Larkhall (3)
Party	Candidate	Votes	%	±%
Labour	Kevin Craig* (Note: Craig was elected in a by-election triggered by the resignation of Cllr Jones in 1997)	1,357	41.75	▼4.13
Labour	Rupert Bawden	1,252		
Labour	Esther Green	1,112		
Liberal Democrats	Clive Parry	970	29.44	▼13.24
Liberal Democrats	Shane Redfearn-Sinclair	872		
Liberal Democrats	George Watson	782		
Independent	Elizabeth Tapsell* (Note: Tapsell was originally elected as a Labour Councillor but she decided to run as an independent)	413	13.90	New
Green	Henry Bewley	207	6.97	New
Conservative	Penelope Sinclair	206	5.18	▼4.34
Conservative	Helen Gentry	135		
Conservative	William Trelawney	121		
Independent	Joseph Desouza	82	2.76	New
Registered electors		8,670		▲472
Turnout		2,767	31.91	▼3.22
Rejected ballots		10	0.36	▲0.12
Labour hold				
Labour gain from Independent				
Labour gain from Liberal Democrats				

=== Oval ===
Oval (3)
Party	Candidate	Votes	%	±%
Liberal Democrats	Marietta Crichton-Stuart*	1,412	48.82	▲1.06
Liberal Democrats	John Feenan	1,267		
Liberal Democrats	Andrew Sawdon*	1,261		
Labour	Elizabeth Atkinson	1,053	34.80	▼6.36
Labour	Stephen Beer	925		
Labour	John Hayes	831		
Conservative	John Taylor	404	10.21	▲2.91
Conservative	Christopher Sinclair	230		
Conservative	Robert Halfon	190		
Socialist (GB)	Anne Hollifield	166	6.17	New
Registered electors		8,733		▲754
Turnout		2,769	31.71	▼13.36
Rejected ballots		5	0.18	▲0.07
Liberal Democrats hold				
Liberal Democrats hold				
Liberal Democrats hold				

=== Prince's ===
Prince's (3)
Party	Candidate	Votes	%	±%
Liberal Democrats	Michael Tuffrey*	1,204	54.05	▼8.18
Liberal Democrats	Keith Fitchett*	1,134		
Liberal Democrats	Sandra Lawman* (Note: Lawman was elected in a by-election triggered by the resignation of Cllr Liddle in 1995)	1,095		
Labour	Matthew Clifton	757	33.93	▲5.10
Labour	Alistair Fletcher	725		
Labour	David Salisbury-Jones^{†} (Note: Salisbury-Jones was a sitting councillor representing the Tulse Hill ward)	673		
Conservative	Stephen Collier	235	10.42	▲3.32
Conservative	Andrew Hayes	218		
Conservative	Jane Wright	209		
Independent	James Wood	34	1.60	New
Registered electors		6,282		▲143
Turnout		2,295	36.53	▼11.56
Rejected ballots		7	0.31	▲0.17
Liberal Democrats hold				
Liberal Democrats hold				
Liberal Democrats hold				

=== St Leonard's ===
St Leonard's (3)
Party	Candidate	Votes	%	±%
Liberal Democrats	Clive Bennett	1,162	42.85	▲8.75
Liberal Democrats	Brian Palmer	1,103		
Liberal Democrats	Roger Giess	1,092		
Labour	Sally Bowdery	727	26.29	▲4.18
Labour	Roger Bowdery	703		
Labour	Brycchan Carey	630		
Conservative	Joanna Barker	618	22.70	▼21.09
Conservative	Andrew Burkinshaw	580		
Conservative	Glyn Kyle	580		
Green	Hugh Fraser	213	8.16	New
Registered electors		8,296		▲362
Turnout		2,660	32.06	▼12.07
Rejected ballots		7	0.26	▼0.03
Liberal Democrats gain from Conservative				
Liberal Democrats gain from Conservative				
Liberal Democrats gain from Conservative				

=== St Martin's ===
St Martin's (3)
Party	Candidate	Votes	%	±%
Labour	Judith Brodie	1,189	55.29	▲17.33
Labour	Thomas Franklin*	1,138		
Labour	Toren Smith*	1,049		
Conservative	Claire Baker	451	18.74	▲18.31
Conservative	Michael Lawson	363		
Conservative	Carolyn Young	330		
Liberal Democrats	Peter Alman	296	13.54	▼3.08
Liberal Democrats	Philip Marshall	284		
Green	Maureen Owens	253	12.43	New
Liberal Democrats	Robert Russell	247		
Registered electors		7,798		▲339
Turnout		2,083	26.71	▼16.62
Rejected ballots		6	0.29	▲0.23
Labour hold				
Labour gain from Conservative				
Labour hold				

=== Stockwell ===
Stockwell (3)
Party	Candidate	Votes	%	±%
Liberal Democrats	Anthony Bottrall*	1,043	41.54	▼6.70
Labour	Hugh David	1,020	41.51	▲9.28
Labour	Abigail Melville	917		
Liberal Democrats	Catherine Cumberbatch-Barnett	884		
Liberal Democrats	Emma Must	844		
Labour	Kamal Paul	832		
Green	James Fraser	207	9.31	▲5.37
Conservative	Keith Best	202	7.63	▼6.42
Conservative	Virginia Taylor	167		
Conservative	Elizabeth Gibson	140		
Registered electors		7,842		▲593
Turnout		2,357	30.06	▼15.28
Rejected ballots		27	1.15	▲1.03
Liberal Democrats hold				
Labour gain from Liberal Democrats				
Labour gain from Liberal Democrats				

=== Streatham Hill ===
Streatham Hill (3)
Party	Candidate	Votes	%	±%
Liberal Democrats	June Fewtrell	1,513	50.33	▼4.11
Liberal Democrats	Roger O'Brien	1,483		
Liberal Democrats	Ashley Lumsden	1,413		
Labour	John Ohen	865	27.79	▲7.49
Labour	Syed Islam	832		
Labour	Daniel Sabbagh	737		
Conservative	Roger Bennett	302	9.73	▼9.88
Conservative	Anna Hunter	276		
Green	Sheila Freeman	275	9.42	▲3.77
Conservative	David Stephens	274		
Socialist Alliance	Sally Coombs	80	2.74	New
Registered electors		9,213		▲245
Turnout		2,933	31.84	▼12.46
Rejected ballots		5	0.17	▲0.04
Liberal Democrats hold				
Liberal Democrats hold				
Liberal Democrats hold				

=== Streatham South ===
Streatham South (3)
Party	Candidate	Votes	%	±%
Labour	Alan White	1,804	56.69	▲22.52
Labour	John Kazantzis	1,738		
Labour	Timothy Sargeant	1,674		
Conservative	Fiona Bulmer	1,130	35.81	▼13.02
Conservative	Anthony Bays*	1,104		
Conservative	Caroline King	1,061		
Liberal Democrats	Lesley Trott	249	7.50	▼9.49
Liberal Democrats	David Trott	236		
Liberal Democrats	Allen Pitt	205		
Registered electors		8,442		▲315
Turnout		3,459	40.97	▼8.73
Rejected ballots		20	0.58	▲0.46
Labour gain from Conservative				
Labour gain from Conservative				
Labour gain from Conservative				

=== Streatham Wells ===
Streatham Wells (3)
Party	Candidate	Votes	%	±%
Liberal Democrats	Julian Heather*	1,556	51.45	▲5.40
Liberal Democrats	Sheila Clarke	1,467		
Liberal Democrats	Daphne Hayes-Mojon*	1,419		
Labour	Robert Hill	964	30.24	▲10.70
Labour	Janet Poole	850		
Labour	Gordon Poole	797		
Conservative	Anthony Liell	311	9.49	▼19.11
Conservative	Lisabeth Liell	261		
Green	Michael O'Gara	254	8.82	▲3.02
Conservative	Richard Patient	247		
Registered electors		9,842		▲223
Turnout		2,966	30.14	▼14.76
Rejected ballots		22	0.74	▲0.51
Liberal Democrats hold				
Liberal Democrats hold				
Liberal Democrats hold				

=== Thornton ===
Thornton (2)
Party	Candidate	Votes	%	±%
Labour	Anthony Hewitt	1,178	46.21	▲12.95
Labour	Julie Minns	1,129		
Liberal Democrats	John Pindar* (Note: The incumbents middle name was john, but he decided to only use his middle name this election)	1,080	42.47	▲3.21
Liberal Democrats	Robert Doyle	1,040		
Conservative	Claude Randall	170	6.43	▼15.57
Conservative	Mark Kotecha	151		
Green	Lee Allane	122	4.89	New
Registered electors		6,131		▲245
Turnout		2,610	42.57	▼11.83
Rejected ballots		31	1.19	▲0.94
Labour gain from Liberal Democrats				
Labour gain from Liberal Democrats				

=== Thurlow Park ===
Thurlow Park (2)
Party	Candidate	Votes	%	±%
Conservative	Clare Whelan*	1,146	50.20	▼5.52
Conservative	John Whelan*	1,138		
Liberal Democrats	Charlotte Barraclough	669	28.24	▲4.51
Liberal Democrats	Tom Cornwall	616		
Labour	Ann Fraser	415	16.59	▼3.96
Labour	Paul Wilson	340		
Green	Matthew Rhys-Roberts	113	4.97	New
Registered electors		5,560		▲185
Turnout		2,322	41.76	▲7.77
Rejected ballots		10	0.43	▲0.24
Conservative hold				
Conservative hold				

=== Town Hall ===
Town Hall (3)
Party	Candidate	Votes	%	±%
Labour	Geraldine Curtis*	1,432	50.67	▲3.22
Labour	Steven Reed	1,311		
Labour	Christopher Cattermole*	1,294		
Green	Roger Baker	535	20.14	▲6.80
Liberal Democrats	Elsie Binder	441	14.39	▼3.79
Liberal Democrats	Rosaleen Mansfield	361		
Liberal Democrats	Duncan Brack	345		
Conservative	Alexander Mackenzie-Smith	254	9.07	▼11.96
Conservative	Amanda Hodgkinson	249		
Conservative	Katherine Tack	220		
Socialist Alliance	Lawrence Coombs	152	5.72	New
Registered electors		9,065		▲12
Turnout		2,447	26.99	▼12.01
Rejected ballots		37	1.51	▲1.43
Labour hold				
Labour hold				
Labour hold				

=== Tulse Hill ===
Tulse Hill (3)
Party	Candidate	Votes	%	±%
Labour	Teifion Goddard	1,663	64.38	▲19.36
Labour	Jacqueline Meldrum	1,326		
Labour	Johanna Sherrington	1,245		
Green	William Collins	360	14.92	▲5.33
Green	Catherine Mukhopadhyay	338		
Liberal Democrats	Winifred Hayes	319	13.29	▼0.99
Liberal Democrats	Laura Morland	313		
Green	Sam WIld	276		
Liberal Democrats	Charles Manfield	236		
Conservative	Michael Adkin	172	7.41	▼2.73
Conservative	John Prior	172		
Conservative	Graham Pycock	140		
Registered electors		8,335		▲244
Turnout		2,266	27.19	▼11.62
Rejected ballots		17	0.75	▲0.43
Labour hold				
Labour hold				
Labour hold				

=== Vassall ===
Vassall (3)
Party	Candidate	Votes	%	±%
Labour	Kitty Ussher	1,299	45.60	▲9.47
Labour	Michael Cruickshanks	1,298		
Labour	Alexander McKenna	1,266		
Liberal Democrats	Adeline Aina	1,030	35.75	▼7.52
Liberal Democrats	Geoffrey Bowring*	1,017		
Liberal Democrats	John Denny*	981		
Green	Peter Crush	262	9.28	▲1.37
Conservative	Nicholas Gibbon	179	6.08	▼2.53
Conservative	Anthony Shakespeare	168		
Conservative	Martin Taylor	168		
Independent	Michael Garry	93	3.29	New
Registered electors		9,513		▲615
Turnout		2,880	30.27	▼5.95
Rejected ballots		49	1.70	▲1.64
Labour gain from Liberal Democrats				
Labour gain from Liberal Democrats				
Labour gain from Liberal Democrats				
