= Mark Bittlestone =

English stand-up comedian

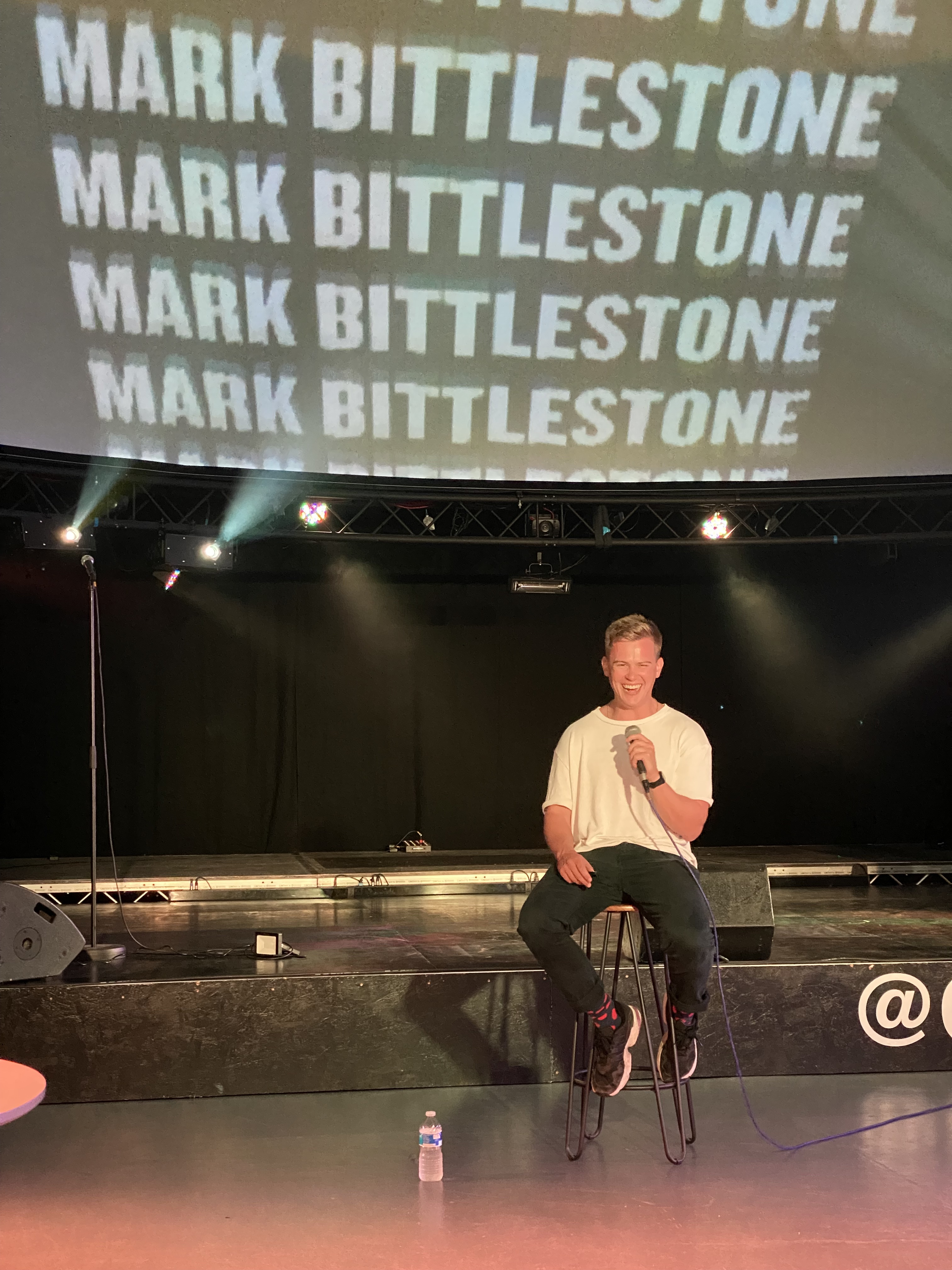
- Bittlestone performing in Cardiff, Wales in August 2021
- Born: Mark Christopher Bittlestone; 13 June 1993 (age 33); Hammersmith, London, England
- Education: University of Cambridge
- Occupation: Stand-up comedian
- Years active: 2012–present
- Website: markbittlestone.com

Mark Christopher Bittlestone (born 13 June 1993) is an English stand-up comedian. He has performed various shows at the Edinburgh Fringe and is known for his sketch videos on TikTok.

== Early life ==
Bittlestone was born on 13 June 1993 in the district of Hammersmith and was privately educated at King's College School in Wimbledon, London. He studied history at the University of Cambridge, attaining a Double First.

Bittlestone is both openly gay and an adult orphan which inspired some of his earliest stand up material exploring the topics of homosexuality, death and grief. His mother Jean was diagnosed with stage four glioblastoma in February 2010 and died in April 2011 and his father Robert, author of Odysseus Unbound, died by suicide in May 2015.

== Career ==
Bittlestone was a member of the Cambridge Footlights, writing for and performing in a variety of shows during his time at university. One of these shows, 'Babushka', transferred to the Edinburgh Fringe in 2016, marking his first appearance as a performer at the performing arts festival.

Bittlestone's debut solo show, 'Pity Laughs', was first performed in Cambridge in January 2017. Later that year he collaborated with Will Dalrymple and performed at the Edinburgh Fringe in a split bill show named 'Pity Laughs: A Tale of Two Gays'. A reworked version of the show returned in 2018.

In 2019, Bittlestone and fellow Footlight Haydn Jenkins devised and performed in a comedy sketch show called 'Llaugh'. The duo appeared in the Leicester Square Theatre Sketch Off final in 2019 and 2020.

Bittlestone returned to the Edinburgh Fringe in 2022 with a split bill show named 'Two Sour Gays' alongside Chris Hall.

In 2023, Bittlestone appeared at the Edinburgh Fringe in a solo show named 'Poofs "R" Us'. During that year he supported Eshaan Akbar on his tour.

Bittlestone performed his debut solo hour, 'I Need a Straight Guy' at the 2024 Edinburgh Fringe. He was shortlisted for Best Newcomer at the ISH Edinburgh Comedy Awards. The show was named because he needed a heterosexual male in the audience for the through line to work. It went on tour at various venues across the United Kingdom in May and June 2025.

== Podcast appearances ==
Bittlestone is a joint host of the Dirty Laundry podcast, along with Jamie D'Souza. The show went on hiatus in October 2024.

Bittlestone has also been invited onto several independent podcasts to talk about his life and share his experiences:

Year	Podcast name	Episode
2020	Guy and a Gal	Series 2, episode 2
2021	Celebrity Prelash	Series 1, episode 7
2022	Chatting with Cherubs	Episode 15
2023	My Mum Made Me	Series 2, episode 4
2023	Didn't Ask for Agony	Episode 21
2023	Our Dads Died	Series 2, episode 8
2024	There Will Be Film	Episode 22
2024	The Bold Shout Podcast	Episode 6
2025	My Mate Bought A Toaster	Series 9, episode 18
2025	My Bad	Episode 4

== Politics ==
Bittlestone was selected as a Green Party candidate for Clapham Town for the 2026 Lambeth London Borough Council election. In May 2026, Bittlestone was one of several Green Party candidates reported to have made controversial social media posts relating to the Israel-Hamas conflict, with Chortle reporting that Bittlestone had deleted all of his social media profiles in the wake of being "exposed for promoting antisemitic messages online". The reports emerged amid wider scrutiny of alleged antisemitism within the Green Party during the 2026 United Kingdom local elections. Bittlestone failed to win election to the council after finishing fifth.
