= Knight's Hill, West Norwood =

Coordinates: 51.426989°N 0.104907°W

Knight's Hill
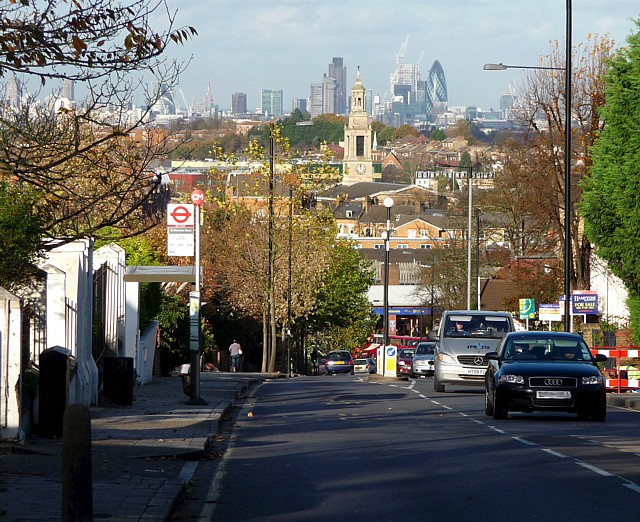
- View of the City of London from Knight's Hill

- Location within Greater London
- London borough: Lambeth
- Ceremonial county: Greater London
- Region: London
- Country: England
- Sovereign state: United Kingdom
- Post town: LONDON
- Postcode district: SE27
- Dialling code: 020
- Police: Metropolitan
- Fire: London
- Ambulance: London
- London Assembly: Lambeth and Southwark

Knights Hill is part of the A215 in West Norwood, London and an area of the London Borough of Lambeth.

== History ==
Former Lord Chancellor Lord Thurlow lived in the area in the 1780s.

== Governance ==
The area has been part of the Knight's Hill ward of Lambeth since 1965.

== Geography ==
The road itself starts in the north at West Norwood in the Norwood Triangle. It ends in the south at a junction with the A214 at Crown Lane and Crown Dale. Knights Hill Road becomes Beulah Hill at this point. The area around Crown Point or Crown Hill was known as Knights Common as the Knight family owned land in the area, the dropping of the word road has led to the confusion with the original Knights Hill in Tulse Hill. In the north, Knights Hill is home to a large parade of shops. See A215 road for more information.
