= Streatham St Leonard's =

Electoral ward in London, England

Coordinates: 51.429°N 0.131°W

- Electoral ward for the Lambeth London Borough Council
- Streatham St Leonard's ward boundaries since 2022
- Borough: Lambeth
- County: Greater London
- Population: 15,814 (2021) (Note: 2021 Census data reported for 2022 ward boundaries)
- Electorate: 10,805 (2022)
- Area: 1.449 square kilometres (0.559 sq mi)

Current electoral ward
- Created: 2022
- Number of members: 3
- Members: Scott Ainslie; Alice Weavers; Alex Davies
- Created from: St Leonard's and Streatham South
- GSS code: E05014115

Streatham St Leonard's is an electoral ward in the London Borough of Lambeth, United Kingdom. The ward was created in 2022 from the St Leonard's ward and part of Streatham South. It was first used in the 2022 elections. It returns three councillors to Lambeth London Borough Council. Since the 2024 general election, Streatham St Leonard's ward has been within the Streatham and Croydon North parliamentary constituency, represented in Parliament by Steve Reed of the Labour Party.

== List of councillors ==
Seat	Councillor	Took office	Left office	Party	Election
1	Scott Ainslie	2022	Incumbent	Green	2022, 2026
2	Nicole Griffiths	2022	2026	Green	2022
3	Martin Abrams (Note: Martin Abrams was elected for the Labour Party and changed parties in 2025.)	2022	2026	Green	2022
2	Alice Weavers	2026	Incumbent	Green	2026
3	Saiqa Ali (Note: Saiqa Ali was elected for the Green Party and was suspended in 2026.)	2026	2026	Independent	2026
3	Alex Davies	2026	Incumbent	Liberal Democrats	2026

== Summary ==
Councillors elected by party at each general borough election.

- Labour
- Green

== Lambeth council elections ==
=== 2026 by-election ===
The by-election took place on 9 July 2026, following the resignation of Saiqa Ali.

2026 Streatham St Leonard's by-election
Party	Candidate	Votes	%	±%
Liberal Democrats	Alex Davies	1,161		
Green	Dario Goodwin	972		
Labour	Jade Albas	421		
Conservative	Chris Cousins	119		
Reform	Mark McKee	71		
CPA	Yemi Awolola	37		
Turnout				
Liberal Democrats gain from Green		Swing		

=== 2026 election ===
The election took place on 7 May 2026.

2026 Lambeth London Borough Council election: Streatham St Leonard's
Party	Candidate	Votes	%	±%
Green	Scott Ainslie	2,242		
Green	Alice Weavers	2,037		
Green	Saiqa Ali	1,437		
Labour	Jade Albás	1,084		
Labour	Joe Gibbons	953		
Labour	Edwin Sheppard	833		
Liberal Democrats	Robert Doyle	726		
Liberal Democrats	Alex Frankl	492		
Liberal Democrats	Phil Stanier	458		
Conservative	Wendy Newall	349		
Conservative	Russell Henman	338		
Reform	Philip Marshall	320		
Conservative	Bryan Wilsher	295		
Reform	Jonathan Rea	287		
Reform	Harpreet Singh	263		
Turnout				
Registered electors		10,736		
Green hold		Swing		
Green hold		Swing		
Green hold		Swing		

=== 2022 election ===
The election took place on 5 May 2022.

2022 Lambeth London Borough Council election: Streatham St Leonard's
Party	Candidate	Votes	%	±%
Green	Scott Ainslie (Note: Councillor for St Leonard's since 2014.)	1,727		
Green	Nicole Griffiths (Note: Councillor for St Leonard's since 2018.)	1,683		
Labour	Martin Abrams	1,525		
Green	Jonny Dobbs-Grove	1,428		
Labour	Denean Rowe	1,353		
Labour	Umar Qureshi	1,336		
Conservative	Elaine Bailey	337		
Conservative	Claire Collins	312		
Conservative	Russell Newall	290		
Liberal Democrats	Nicholas Davidson	237		
Liberal Democrats	Gillian Lunnon	227		
Liberal Democrats	Simon Drage	198		
Majority		299	17.3	
Registered electors		10,804		
Turnout		3,551	32.9	
Rejected ballots		28	0.26	
Green win (new seat)				
Green win (new seat)				
Labour win (new seat)				
