= Streatham South (ward) =

Former electoral ward in the London Borough of Lambeth

Coordinates: 51.415°N 0.131°W

- Former electoral ward for the Lambeth London Borough Council
- Streatham South ward boundaries from 2002 to 2022
- Borough: Lambeth
- County: Greater London
- Population: 14,336 (2011)
- Electorate: 10,149 (2018)

Former electoral ward
- Created: 1965
- Abolished: 2022
- Member: 3
- Replaced by: Streatham Common and Vale and Streatham St Leonard's
- GSS code: E05000431

Streatham South was an electoral ward in the London Borough of Lambeth from 1965 to 2022. The ward was first used in the 1964 elections and last used for the 2018 elections. It returned three councillors to Lambeth London Borough Council. The boundary of the ward was revised in 1978 and 2002, with a minor adjustment in 1994.

== 2002–2022 Lambeth council elections ==
There was a revision of ward boundaries in Lambeth in 2002.

=== 2018 election ===
The election took place on 3 May 2018.

2018 Lambeth London Borough Council election: Streatham South (3)
Party	Candidate	Votes	%	±%
Labour	Danial Adilypour	2,217	64.5	
Labour	Clair Wilcox	2,207	64.3	
Labour	John Kazantzis	2,187	63.7	
Conservative	Russell Newall	570	16.6	
Conservative	Helen Smith	539	15.7	
Conservative	Chris Paling	440	12.8	
Green	David Robinson	365	10.6	
Green	Pete Johnson	312	9.1	
Liberal Democrats	Simon Drage	277	8.1	
Green	Charmian Kenner	269	7.8	
Liberal Democrats	Matthew Bryant	241	7.0	
Liberal Democrats	David Hare	215	6.3	
UKIP	John Plume	76	2.2	
UKIP	Simon Harman	66	1.9	
UKIP	Johan Ward	44	1.3	
Labour hold		Swing		
Labour hold		Swing		
Labour hold		Swing		

=== 2014 election ===
The election took place on 22 May 2014.

2014 Lambeth London Borough Council election: Streatham South (3)
Party	Candidate	Votes	%	±%
Labour	John Kazantzis	2,050	60.1	+13.7
Labour	Danial Adilypour	1,992	58.4	+9.5
Labour	Clair Wilcox	1,986	58.2	+9.3
Conservative	Helen Smith	597	17.5	+1.5
Conservative	Jonathan Guinness	540	15.8	+1.4
Conservative	Jack Wharton	495	14.5	+0.6
Green	Emma Hinkson	408	12.0	+7.8
Liberal Democrats	Karen Morfey	301	8.8	−20.0
Green	Benjamin Spencer	291	8.5	+4.1
Liberal Democrats	Nazir Ahmed	275	8.1	−18.5
Liberal Democrats	Ahmad Ali	274	8.0	−21.2
Green	Nigel Melia	262	7.7	+3.4
Turnout		3,411	34.1	
Labour hold		Swing		
Labour hold		Swing		
Labour hold		Swing		

=== 2010 election ===
The election on 6 May 2010 took place on the same day as the United Kingdom general election.

2010 Lambeth London Borough Council election: Streatham South (3)
Party	Candidate	Votes	%	±%
Labour	Mark Bennett	2,882	48.9	
Labour	Dave Malley	2,882	48.9	
Labour	John Kazantzis	2,733	46.4	
Liberal Democrats	Ahmad Ali	1,720	29.2	
Liberal Democrats	Karen Davies-Morfey	1,696	28.8	
Liberal Democrats	Michael Morfey	1,569	26.6	
Conservative	Helen Smith	942	16.0	
Conservative	David McInnes	849	14.4	
Conservative	Andrew Williams	817	13.9	
Green	Elizabeth Davidson	256	4.4	
Green	Yolanda Dolling	251	4.3	
Green	Emma Hinkson	245	4.2	
Total votes		5,889	59.2	
Labour hold		Swing		
Labour hold		Swing		
Labour hold		Swing		

=== 2006 election ===
The election took place on 4 May 2006.

2006 Lambeth London Borough Council election: Streatham South (3)
Party	Candidate	Votes	%	±%
Labour	Mark Bennett	1,725	43.1	
Labour	Dave Malley	1,688		
Labour	John Kazantzis	1,632		
Liberal Democrats	Ahmad Ali	1,483	37.0	
Liberal Democrats	Karen Davies	1,358		
Liberal Democrats	Matthew Bryant	1,244		
Conservative	Stuart Goodey	453	11.3	
Conservative	Carolena Ludwig	376		
Conservative	Christopher Sinclair	369		
Green	Anne Kenner	343	8.6	
Total votes		10,671		
Labour hold		Swing		
Labour hold		Swing		
Labour hold		Swing		

=== 2005 by-election ===
The by-election took place on 20 October 2005, following the death of Tim Sargeant.

2005 Streatham South by-election
Party	Candidate	Votes	%	±%
Labour	Mark Bennett	1,466	49.2	+9.1
Liberal Democrats	Ahmad Ali	1,211	40.7	+6.0
Conservative	Lisabeth Liell	301	10.1	−8.1
Majority		255	8.5	
Turnout		2,978	31.7	+1.1
Labour hold		Swing		

=== 2002 election ===
The election took place on 2 May 2002.

2002 Lambeth London Borough Council election: Streatham South (3)
Party	Candidate	Votes	%	±%
Labour	Dave Malley	1,188	14.7	
Labour	John Kazantzis	1,123	13.9	
Labour	Tim Sargeant	1,093	13.5	
Liberal Democrats	Wendy Golding	1,027	12.7	
Liberal Democrats	Robert Williams	943	11.7	
Liberal Democrats	Graham Lee	931	11.5	
Conservative	Habib Choudhury	538	6.7	
Conservative	Stephen McMenamin	517	6.4	
Conservative	Michael Winch	507	6.3	
Green	Michael O'Gara	208	2.6	
Turnout		8,075	30.6	
Labour win (new boundaries)				
Labour win (new boundaries)				
Labour win (new boundaries)				

== 1978–2002 Lambeth council elections ==
Streatham South ward boundaries from 1978 to 1994

There was a revision of ward boundaries in Lambeth in 1978. There were some minor adjustments to the ward boundary on 1 April 1994, with some territory and population exchanged with the Croydon wards of Norbury and Upper Norwood.

=== 1999 by-election ===
The by-election took place on 6 May 1999, following the resignation of Alan White.

1999 Streatham South by-election
Party	Candidate	Votes	%	±%
Labour	David Malley	1,515	45.7	−11.0
Liberal Democrats	Kathleen Ward	996	30.1	+22.3
Conservative	Joanna Barker	753	22.7	−12.8
Independent	Andrew Morris	48	1.5	+1.5
Majority		519	15.6	
Turnout		3,312	38.5	
Labour hold		Swing		

=== 1998 election ===
The election on 7 May 1998 took place on the same day as the 1998 Greater London Authority referendum.

1998 Lambeth London Borough Council election: Streatham South (3)
Party	Candidate	Votes	%	±%
Labour	Alan White	1,804	56.69	▲22.52
Labour	John Kazantzis	1,738		
Labour	Timothy Sargeant	1,674		
Conservative	Fiona Bulmer	1,130	35.81	▼13.02
Conservative	Anthony Bays	1,104		
Conservative	Caroline King	1,061		
Liberal Democrats	Lesley Trott	249	7.50	▼9.49
Liberal Democrats	David Trott	236		
Liberal Democrats	Allen Pitt	205		
Registered electors		8,442		▲315
Turnout		3,459	40.97	▼8.73
Rejected ballots		20	0.58	▲0.46
Labour gain from Conservative				
Labour gain from Conservative				
Labour gain from Conservative				

=== 1994 election ===
The election took place on 5 May 1994.

1994 Lambeth London Borough Council election: Streatham South (3)
Party	Candidate	Votes	%	±%
Conservative	Simon Hooberman	1,834	48.83	▲0.52
Conservative	Edward Castle	1,822		
Conservative	Anthony Bays	1,810		
Labour	Andrew Hill	1,330	34.17	▼1.45
Labour	Amanda Morgan	1,251		
Labour	Michael Correa	1,244		
Liberal Democrats	Valerie Collins	687	16.99	▲8.42
Liberal Democrats	Paul James	608		
Liberal Democrats	Irene Yarwood	608		
Registered electors		8,127		▼53
Turnout		4,039	49.70	▼1.59
Rejected ballots		5	0.12	▼0.09
Conservative hold				
Conservative hold				
Conservative hold				

=== 1990 election ===
The election took place on 3 May 1990.

=== 1986 election ===
The election took place on 8 May 1986.

=== 1982 election ===
The election took place on 6 May 1982.

=== 1978 election ===
The election took place on 4 May 1978.

== 1964–1978 Lambeth council elections ==
=== 1974 election ===
The election took place on 2 May 1974.

=== 1971 election ===
The election took place on 13 May 1971.

=== 1968 election ===
The election took place on 9 May 1968.

=== 1964 election ===
The election took place on 7 May 1964.

1964 Lambeth London Borough Council election: Streatham South (3)
Party	Candidate	Votes	%	±%
Conservative	P. Cary	2,323	57.0	
Conservative	C. Parkinson	2,321		
Conservative	F. Weyer	2,296		
Labour	E. Tarver	1,162	28.5	
Labour	M. Verden	1,142		
Labour	J. McMaster	1,133		
Liberal	K. Cherrill	592	14.5	
Liberal	M. Mattinson	590		
Liberal	D. Bassi	558		
Turnout		4,094	33.4	
Registered electors		12,253		
Conservative win (new seat)				
Conservative win (new seat)				
Conservative win (new seat)				
