= Scott Ainslie =

Green Party of England and Wales politician and actor

Councillor Scott Ainslie
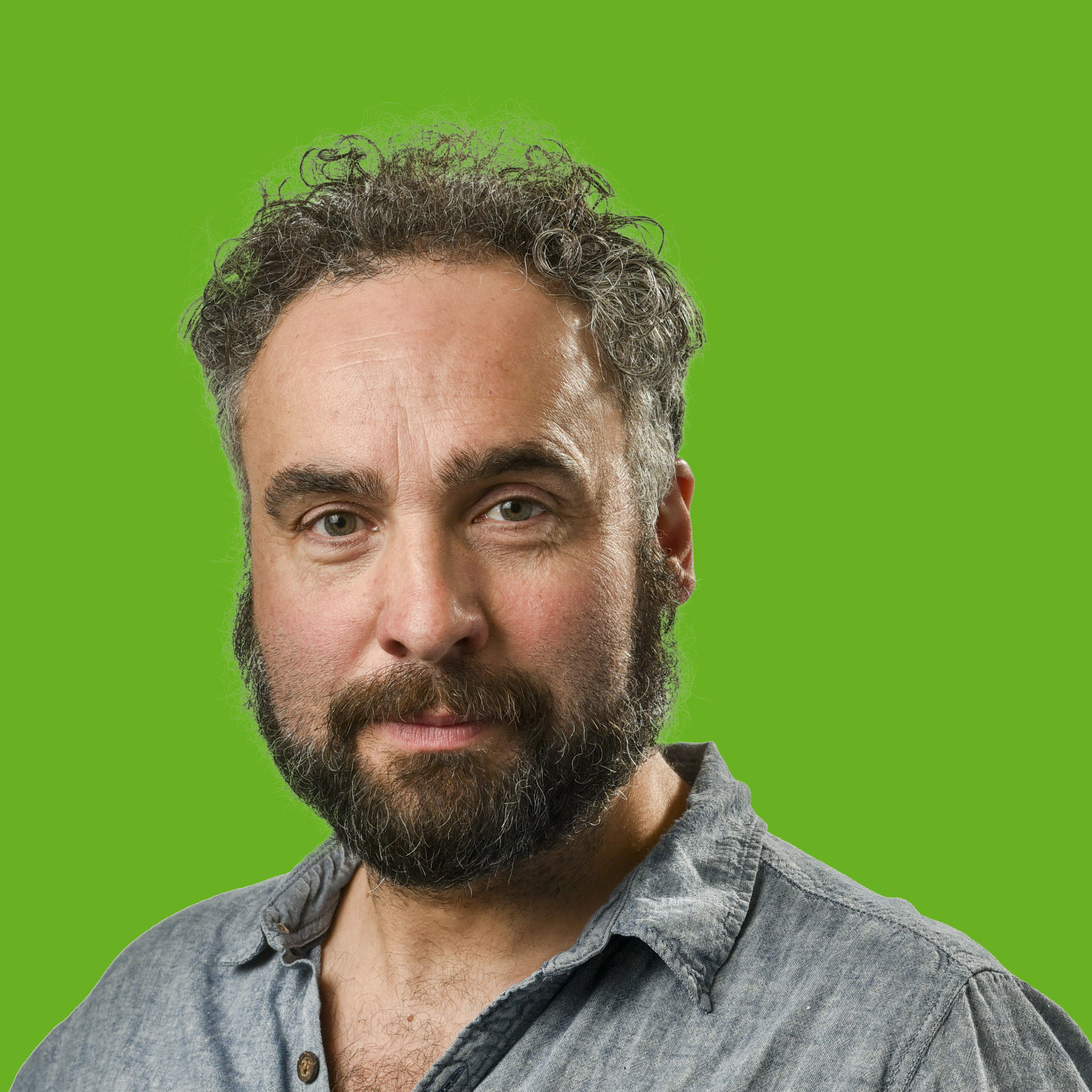
- Ainslie in 2020

Member of the European Parliament for London
- In office 2 July 2019 – 31 January 2020
- Preceded by: Jean Lambert
- Succeeded by: Constituency abolished

Lambeth London Borough Councillor for Streatham St Leonard's
- Incumbent
- Assumed office 22 May 2014
- Preceded by: Brian Palmer
- Majority: 1,158

Personal details
- Born: Scott John Ainslie; 27 December 1968 (age 57) Edinburgh, Scotland
- Party: Green Party of England and Wales
- Education: Edinburgh Napier University (BA); Mountview Academy of Theatre Arts (PGDip)
- Occupation: Politician; actor

Scott John Ainslie (born 27 December 1968) is a British politician and actor.

He was elected as a Green Party Member of the European Parliament (MEP) for London in the 2019 European parliamentary election. He held this role until the United Kingdom's withdrawal from the EU. Ainslie has also been a councillor on the Lambeth Council in London since 2014, representing Streatham St Leonard's ward, where he served as Leader of the Opposition from September 2025 to May 2026.

Ainslie was the Green candidate for the new constituency of Streatham and Croydon North in the 2024 United Kingdom general election, coming in second place with 17.1% of the vote.

== Early life and education ==
Scott John Ainslie was born on 27 December 1968 in Edinburgh. He grew up in a council flat, and has one younger sister. Ainslie graduated from Edinburgh Napier University with an economics degree. After graduating he studied at the drama school Mountview Academy of Theatre Arts on a scholarship. He moved to Streatham in London in 1997.

== Acting career ==
Ainslie is also an actor. His acting roles include appearances in independent horror film The Zombie Diaries (2006), anthology horror film Little Deaths (2011), and musical adaptation Local Hero (2019).

== Political career ==
Ainslie has been a Green Party Councillor in the London Borough of Lambeth since 2014, representing the Streatham St Leonard's Ward. From 2018 to 2022, he was the Opposition Lead on Standards and Monitoring.

From 2022 to 2026, Ainslie was leader of the Green Group on Lambeth Council.

Ainslie stood as a candidate for the Green Party in the 2019 European parliamentary election. He was first on his party's list and was elected as its only MEP in the London constituency. In the European Parliament, Ainslie was a member of the Committee on Transport and Tourism, and was part of the delegation to the ACP–EU Joint Parliamentary Assembly. In the 2019 general election, Ainslie was the Green Party candidate for the South London-based seat of Streatham, where he finished in fourth with 4.5% of the vote. Ainslie stood in one of the successors of the Streatham seat, Streatham and Croydon North in the 2024 general election, coming in second place with 17.1% of the vote.
