= Streatham Hill East =

Electoral ward in London, England

- Electoral ward for the Lambeth London Borough Council
- Beam Park ward boundaries since 2022
- Borough: Lambeth
- County: Greater London
- Population: 9,877 (2021) (Note: 2021 Census data reported for 2022 ward boundaries)
- Electorate: 7,183 (2022)
- Major settlements: Streatham
- Area: 0.7833 square kilometres (0.3024 sq mi)

Current electoral ward
- Created: 2022
- Number of members: 2
- Councillors: Martin Abrams; Amelia Shoebridge
- Created from: Streatham Hill
- GSS code: E05014113

Streatham Hill East is an electoral ward in the London Borough of Lambeth. The ward was first used in the 2022 elections. It returns two councillors to Lambeth London Borough Council.

== List of councillors ==
Seat	Councillor	Took office	Left office	Party	Election
1	Liz Atkins	2022	2026	Labour	2022
2	Rezina Chowdhury	2022	2026	Labour	2022
1	Martin Abrams	2026	Incumbent	Green	2026
2	Amelia Shoebridge	2026	Incumbent	Green	2026

== Lambeth council elections ==
The ward was created in 2022.

=== 2026 election ===
The election took place on 7 May 2026.

2026 Lambeth London Borough Council election : Streatham Hill East (2)
Party	Candidate	Votes	%	±%
Green	Martin Abrams (Note: Martin Abrams was a councillor for Streatham St Leonard's ward.)	1,333	22	
Green	Amelia Shoebridge	1,270	21	
Labour Co-op	Liz Atkins	855	14	
Liberal Democrats	Alex Davies	760	12	
Labour Co-op	Rezina Chowdhury	759	12	
Liberal Democrats	Tobias Ikegbunam	687	11	
Reform	Goran Gligoric	172	3	
Conservative	Colin Anthony Watkins	144	2	
Conservative	Franklin Kwadwo Twum	125	2	
Turnout				
Registered electors		7,215		
Green gain from Labour		Swing		
Green gain from Labour		Swing		

=== 2022 election ===
The election took place on 5 May 2022.

2022 Lambeth London Borough Council election : Streatham Hill East (2)
Party	Candidate	Votes	%	±%
Labour	Liz Atkins (Note: Liz Atkins was a councillor for Streatham Hill ward.)	1,249	57.9	
Labour	Rezina Chowdhury (Note: Rezina Chowdhury was a councillor for Streatham Hill ward.)	1,198	55.5	
Green	Rachel Alexander	522	24.2	
Green	Leon Maurice-Jones	353	16.4	
Conservative	Thomas Gray	315	14.6	
Conservative	Neil Salt	285	13.2	
Liberal Democrats	Judy Best	227	10.5	
Liberal Democrats	Donal Kane	165	7.6	
Turnout		2,213	30.8	
Labour win (new boundaries)				
Labour win (new boundaries)				
