= Streatham Hill (ward) =

Former electoral ward of the London Borough of Lambeth, England

Coordinates: 51.441°N 0.123°W

- Former electoral ward for the Lambeth London Borough Council
- Borough: Lambeth
- County: Greater London

Former electoral ward
- Created: 1978
- Abolished: 2022
- Member: 3
- Replaced by: Streatham Hill East (ward); Streatham Hill West and Thornton (ward)

Streatham Hill ward was an administrative division of the London Borough of Lambeth, United Kingdom from 1978 to 2022. It included the neighbourhoods in the northern part of Streatham either side of the road of the same name.

== Ward Profile ==
The ward boundaries were:

- north: the A205 South Circular Road along Streatham Place and Christchurch Road;
- east: Norwood Road;
- south: the boundary between the SW2 and SW16 postcodes - to the west this follows the railway from Streatham Hill station;
- west: boundary with the London Borough of Wandsworth at Tooting Bec Common and Emmanuel Road/New Park Road.

Streatham Hill ward was located in the Streatham Parliamentary constituency.

== Lambeth Council elections ==
=== 2018 election ===
Streatham Hill 2018 (3)
| Party | Candidate | Votes | % | ±% |
|---|---|---|---|---|
| Labour | Liz Atkins* | 2,253 | | |
| Labour | Rezina Chowdhury* | 2,121 | | |
| Labour | Iain Simpson* | 1,912 | | |
| Green | Will Aspinall | 656 | | |
| Green | Chris Holt | 608 | | |
| Conservative | Alexa Bailey | 558 | | |
| Green | Leon Maurice-Jones | 517 | | |
| Conservative | Simon Hemsley | 505 | | |
| Conservative | Kushal Patel | 499 | | |
| Liberal Democrats | Ashley Lumsden | 404 | | |
| Liberal Democrats | Ishbel Brown | 379 | | |
| Liberal Democrats | Roger Giess | 360 | | |
| Labour hold | | Swing | | |
| Labour hold | | Swing | | |
| Labour hold | | Swing | | |

=== 2014 election ===
Streatham Hill 2014 (3)
| Party | Candidate | Votes | % | ±% |
|---|---|---|---|---|
| Labour | Liz Atkins | 1,736 | | |
| Labour | Rezina Chowdhury | 1,582 | | |
| Labour | Iain Simpson | 1,448 | | |
| Liberal Democrats | Jeremy Clyne* | 1,272 | | |
| Liberal Democrats | Ashley Lumsden* | 1,234 | | |
| Liberal Democrats | Kita Ogden* | 1,100 | | |
| Green | David Bryant | 515 | | |
| Conservative | Elaine Bailey | 482 | | |
| Green | Leon Maurice-Jones | 414 | | |
| Green | James Caspell | 411 | | |
| Conservative | Mark Wallace | 397 | | |
| Conservative | Philip Henwood | 367 | | |
| UKIP | Peter Younghusband | 222 | | |
| Total votes | | 11,065 | | |
| Labour gain from Liberal Democrats | | Swing | | |
| Labour gain from Liberal Democrats | | Swing | | |
| Labour gain from Liberal Democrats | | Swing | | |

=== 2010 election ===
Streatham Hill 2010 (3)
| Party | Candidate | Votes | % | ±% |
|---|---|---|---|---|
| Liberal Democrats | Jeremy Clyne * | 2,448 | | |
| Liberal Democrats | Ashley Lumsden * | 2,426 | | |
| Liberal Democrats | Carita Ogden | 2,198 | | |
| Labour | Anne Marie Waters | 2,001 | | |
| Labour | Clarence Thompson | 1,957 | | |
| Labour | Jack Holborn | 1,948 | | |
| Conservative | Elaine Bailey | 1,091 | | |
| Conservative | Phillip Henwood | 857 | | |
| Conservative | Peter Younghusband | 796 | | |
| Green | Catherine Potter | 566 | | |
| Green | Martin Wright | 535 | | |
| Green | Shelagh Webb | 458 | | |
| Independent | June Fewtrell * | 393 | | |
| Total votes | | 17,584 | | |
| Liberal Democrats hold | | Swing | | |
| Liberal Democrats hold | | Swing | | |
| Liberal Democrats hold | | Swing | | |

=== 2006 election ===
Streatham Hill 2006 (3)
| Party | Candidate | Votes | % | ±% |
|---|---|---|---|---|
| Liberal Democrats | June Fewtrell * | 1,567 | | |
| Liberal Democrats | Jeremy Clyne * | 1,248 | | |
| Liberal Democrats | Ashley Lumsden * | 1,183 | | |
| Labour | Brian Cowie | 781 | | |
| Labour | Alex Ekumah | 739 | | |
| Labour | Nancy Platts | 717 | | |
| Green | David Ince | 573 | | |
| Independent | Nazim Ali | 540 | | |
| Independent | Christopher Baron | 515 | | |
| Conservative | Peter Younghusband | 411 | | |
| Conservative | Susan Smith | 389 | | |
| Conservative | Titus Lucas | 355 | | |
| Local Education Action by Parents | Dorcas Rogers | 323 | | |
| Total votes | | 9,141 | | |
| Liberal Democrats hold | | Swing | | |
| Liberal Democrats hold | | Swing | | |
| Liberal Democrats hold | | Swing | | |

=== 2002 election ===
Streatham Hill (3)
| Party | Candidate | Votes | % | ±% |
|---|---|---|---|---|
| Liberal Democrats | June Fewtrell | 1,272 | | |
| Liberal Democrats | Jeremy Clyne | 1,158 | | |
| Liberal Democrats | Ashley Lumsden | 1,120 | | |
| Labour | Alex Ekumah | 632 | | |
| Labour | Mohammed Abu-Bakr | 631 | | |
| Labour | Daniel Lawuyi | 561 | | |
| Green | Martin Wright | 378 | | |
| Conservative | Stanley Davies | 287 | | |
| Conservative | Susan Ellis | 284 | | |
| Conservative | Peter Younghusband | 264 | | |
| Turnout | | 6,587 | 24.0 | |
