= Town Hall (Lambeth ward) =

Electoral Ward in London, 1965–2002

- Former electoral ward for the Lambeth London Borough Council
- Town Hall ward boundaries from 1978 to 2002
- Borough: Lambeth
- County: Greater London
- Electorate: 9,065 (1998)
- Major settlements: Brixton

Former electoral ward
- Created: 1965
- Abolished: 2002
- Councillors: 3

Town Hall was an electoral ward in the London Borough of Lambeth from 1965 to 2002. The ward was first used in the 1964 elections and last used for the 1998 elections. It returned three councillors to Lambeth London Borough Council.

== 1978–2002 Lambeth council elections ==
There was a revision of ward boundaries in Lambeth in 1978.

=== 1998 election ===
The election took place on 7 May 1998.

=== 1994 election ===
The election took place on 5 May 1994.

=== 1990 election ===
The election took place on 3 May 1990.

1990 Lambeth London Borough Council election: Town Hall
| Party | Candidate | Votes | % | ±% |
|---|---|---|---|---|
| Labour | Roger Roach | 2,064 | | |
| Labour | Geoffrey Wilkinson | 1,967 | | |
| Labour | Dick Sorabji | 1,957 | | |
| Conservative | Egbert Christie | 1,148 | | |
| Conservative | Stephen Green | 1,133 | | |
| Conservative | Peter Turvey | 1,114 | | |
| Green | Roger Baker | 606 | | |
| Liberal Democrats | Elsie Binder | 300 | | |
| Liberal Democrats | Irene Yarwood | 264 | | |
| Liberal Democrats | Henry Young | 224 | | |
| Registered electors | | 8,993 | | |
| Turnout | | 4,064 | | |
| Rejected ballots | | 10 | 0.2 | |
| Labour hold | | | | |
| Labour hold | | | | |
| Labour hold | | | | |

=== 1986 election ===
The election took place on 8 May 1986.

=== 1982 election ===
The election took place on 6 May 1982.

=== 1978 election ===
The election took place on 4 May 1978.

== 1964–1978 Lambeth council elections ==
=== 1974 election ===
The election took place on 2 May 1974.

=== 1971 election ===
The election took place on 13 May 1971.

1971 Lambeth London Borough Council election: Town Hall
| Party | Candidate | Votes | % | ±% |
|---|---|---|---|---|
| Labour | M. Noble | 2,224 | 20.8% | |
| Labour | F. Rigger | 2,218 | 20.8% | |
| Labour | W. Seeley | 2,188 | 20.5% | |
| Conservative | M. Lingwood | 1,345 | 12.6% | |
| Conservative | M. Becker | 1,308 | 12.2% | |
| Conservative | D. Llewellyn | 1,305 | 12.2% | |
| Independent | Bill Boaks | 98 | 0.9% | |
| Turnout | | 10,686 | | |
| Labour gain from Conservative | | | | |
| Labour gain from Conservative | | | | |
| Labour gain from Conservative | | | | |

=== 1968 election ===
The election took place on 9 May 1968.

1968 Lambeth London Borough Council election: Town Hall
| Party | Candidate | Votes | % | ±% |
|---|---|---|---|---|
| Conservative | J. McDonnell | 2,136 | | |
| Conservative | I. Pepper | 2,134 | | |
| Conservative | G. Barclay | 2,124 | | |
| Labour | C. Draper | 1,144 | | |
| Labour | B. Lawrence | 1,137 | | |
| Labour | H. Rees | 1,127 | | |
| Union Movement | D. Archer | 180 | | |
| Turnout | | | | |
| Conservative gain from Labour | | Swing | | |
| Conservative gain from Labour | | Swing | | |
| Conservative gain from Labour | | Swing | | |

=== 1964 election ===
The election took place on 7 May 1964.

1964 Lambeth London Borough Council election: Town Hall
| Party | Candidate | Votes | % | ±% |
|---|---|---|---|---|
| Labour | P. Huggett | 1,808 | 60.6 | |
| Labour | B. Lawrence | 1,795 | | |
| Labour | W. Seeley | 1,795 | | |
| Conservative | J. Langley | 984 | 33.0 | |
| Conservative | J. Taylor | 969 | | |
| Conservative | W. Fiander | 954 | | |
| Liberal | K. Phelps | 192 | 4.8 | |
| Liberal | A. Banks | 184 | | |
| Liberal | A. Hilton | 180 | | |
| Turnout | | 2,997 | 24.8 | |
| Registered electors | | 12,065 | | |
| Labour win (new seat) | | | | |
| Labour win (new seat) | | | | |
| Labour win (new seat) | | | | |
