= Tritton =

TRITTON
- Pronunciation: /ˈtrɪtən/
- Gender: Male
- Language: English

Origin
- Origin: Old Norse; or Old Norse and Old English
- Meaning: "The farm of Trit"
- Region of origin: Duchy of Normandy (Falaise and Bayeux); and Kingdom of England (Kent and Essex)

Other names
- Alternative spelling: Trittun (11th and Pre-11th Century); or Trytton (17th and Pre-17th Century); or Tritten (17th and Pre-17th Century)
- Variant forms: تريتن (Arabic); トリトン (Japonese); Триттон (Russian); Trıtton (Turkish)
- Related names: Tritten

Tritton is an English surname of Anglo-Norman origin.

== Etymology ==
The name originates from an Anglo-Scandinavian combination of the personal name Trit and of the second element ton. The family name translates as "The farm of Trit". The first element Trit originates either from the Old East Norse dialect þryzker itself from Old Norse þrjózkr ("defiant"); compare with modern Swedish noun trots ("defiance"); meaning "the defiant one" or from the Old Norse þróttr ("force", "power"); compare with modern Icelandic noun þróttur ("vigor", "force"); meaning "the strong one". The second element ton originates from either Old English tūn or Old Norse tún, both sharing the same meaning ("enclosure", "settlement", "farm").

== Region of origin ==
The name occurs in Stapylton's Rolls of the Norman Exchequer and in the ''Mémoires des Antiquaires de Normandie'' as holding lands in the neighborhood of Falaise and Bayeux in Normandy (France) as well as in the counties of Kent and Essex in England during the period covering the end of the 11th Century to the beginning of the 13th Century. The surname also appears in the Lancashire Pipe rolls in the year 1203 with a certain Walter de Tritton, the latter being mentioned as owing half a mark "to be acquitted from an appeal, probably of murder". According to these same literary sources, the name disappears from the coasts of Normandy after the year 1204 coinciding therefore with the French invasion of Normandy (1202–1204).

The Scandinavian and later Norman origins of the name are also reinforced by several hypotheses among which we can cite the etymology of the Norwegian parish of Tretten, the existence of the German village of Trittenheim taking its roots from a Norsemen settlement on the edge of the river Moselle during the Viking raids in the Rhineland or also the italian surname Trittoni of Italo-Norman origin taking its roots from the Norman conquest of southern Italy.

== People ==
Notable people with the name include:

- Arthur Stanley Tritton (1881–1973), British historian and scholar of Islam
- David Tritton (1935–1998), British fluid dynamicist
- Duke Tritton (1886–1965), Australian poet and folk singer
- Sir Ernest Tritton, 1st Baronet (1845–1918), English banker and politician
  - first of the Tritton baronets
- Sir Geoffrey Ernest Tritton, 3rd Baronet (1900–1976), British businessman, soldier and politician
  - third of the Tritton baronets
- Joseph Herbert Tritton (a.k.a. J. Herbert Tritton) (1844–1923), English banker
- Lydia Ellen Tritton (1899–1946), Australian journalist, poet and public elocutionist
- Nicholas Tritton (born 1984), Canadian judoka
- Thomas R. Tritton, American academic administrator
- Sir William Tritton (1875–1946), English expert on agricultural machinery

== See also ==
- Anglo-Norman families
- 157P/Tritton periodic comet
- 46442 Keithtritton asteroid
- Purcell Miller Tritton English architects, designers and historic building consultants
