= Lyons Hall =

Lyons Hall may refer to:

- Lyons Hall, Essex, a historic manor in Essex
- Lyons Hall (University of Notre Dame), a residence hall at the University of Notre Dame

== See also ==
- Lyonshall
- Lyon Hall (disambiguation)
