= Joseph Henry Tritton =

- Born: 30 April 1894; Woolloongabba, City of Brisbane, Queensland
- Died: 29 April 1958 (aged 63) "Willyama", Richmond, Queensland
- Spouse: Edith Clara Matilda Conn
- Children: 3
- Military career
- Allegiance: British Empire, Commonwealth of Australia
- Branch: Australian Imperial Force
- Service years: 1915–20
- Rank: Lieutenant
- Unit: 49th Battalion
- Conflicts: First World War: Western Front; Battle of the Somme

Joseph Henry Tritton, (30 April 1894 – 29 April 1958) was a Lieutenant of the Australian Imperial Force and Second Lieutenant of the 49th Battalion during the First World War.

== Early life ==
Born in the Brisbane suburb of Woolloongabba, Joseph Henry Tritton was educated as a Wool classer in Brisbane. From Brisbane he travelled to Richmond in North Queensland to commence work on a sheep station called "Tarbrax". While working there the Government put blocks of land up for ballot.

== First World War ==
Joseph Henry volunteered to fight for his country, and on 17 September 1915 he headed back to Brisbane and joined the Australian Army at the Enoggera Base. He left by boat and travelled to Egypt where he trained until he was sent to Marseille, France, in 1916 to fight alongside the British and French against the Germans at the Battle of the Somme. He was a member of the 49th Battalion within the 4th Division. Joseph Henry became a Corporal on 3 April 1916 and promoted to Sergeant on 24 August 1916. He then became Second Lieutenant on 16 September 1916. He spent some time returning to England to rehabilitate after contracting illnesses, returning on the front line only to be shot and severely wounded in the right hip by a bullet and was hospitalised on 16 June 1917. After these interruptions Joseph Henry was sent back to France to rejoin his Battalion.

== Later life ==
Joseph Henry returned to Australia on 6 February 1919 and was promoted Lieutenant on 1 October 1920. He then married Edith Clara Matilda Conn on 7 March 1921 in Townsville, Queensland. Joseph Henry died on 29 April 1958 and was buried at the "Meadow Lands" Cemetery, Silver Hills, Richmond, Queensland.

== See also ==
- Tritton family
- 49th Battalion (Australia)
- Western Front (World War I)
- Queensland, Australia
