= John Fraser (British politician) =

John Denis Fraser

Member of Parliament for Norwood
- In office 31 March 1966 – 8 April 1997
- Preceded by: John George Smyth
- Succeeded by: Constituency abolished

Member of Lambeth Metropolitan Borough Council
- In office 1962–1965

Member of Lambeth London Borough Council
- In office 1964–?

Personal details
- Born: 30 June 1934 London, England, UK
- Died: 6 April 2017 (aged 82)
- Party: Labour

John Denis Fraser (30 June 1934 – 6 April 2017) was a Labour Member of Parliament for Norwood in London from 1966 to 1997 and a solicitor.

== Early life and education ==
Fraser was born on 30 June 1934 in Wandsworth, London, to Frances Benedict and Archibald Fraser. He was of Scottish and Irish descent.

He was educated at Sloane Grammar School, Chelsea and the Law Society College of Law, becoming a solicitor. He was a senior partner at the law firm Lewis Silkin LLP.

== Political career ==
Fraser was a councillor on Lambeth Borough Council from 1962 to 1965 and the London Borough of Lambeth from 1964. He was a founding member of the Co-operative (Housing) Development Society.

He served as Under Secretary at the Department of Trade and Industry in 1966, Under Secretary of State for Employment from 1974 to 1976, and Minister of State at the Department of Prices & Consumer Protection from 1976 to 1979. He also has been described by his former law firm as largely contributing to the Unfair Contract Terms Act of 1977 through Parliament.

After leaving government in 1979, Fraser served as an opposition spokesman on trade, housing, construction and legal affairs during the following years.

Norwood was abolished as a constituency in 1997. Fraser lost the selection contest for Dulwich and West Norwood to Tessa Jowell, then MP for Dulwich.

== Personal life ==
Fraser was a devout Catholic, and he often gave readings at church. He married Ann Hathaway in 1960. Together they had three children: two sons and a daughter.

Parliament of the United Kingdom
Preceded by John George Smyth	Member of Parliament for Norwood; 1966 – 1997	Constituency abolished
