= John Syer Bristowe =

British physician (1827–1895)

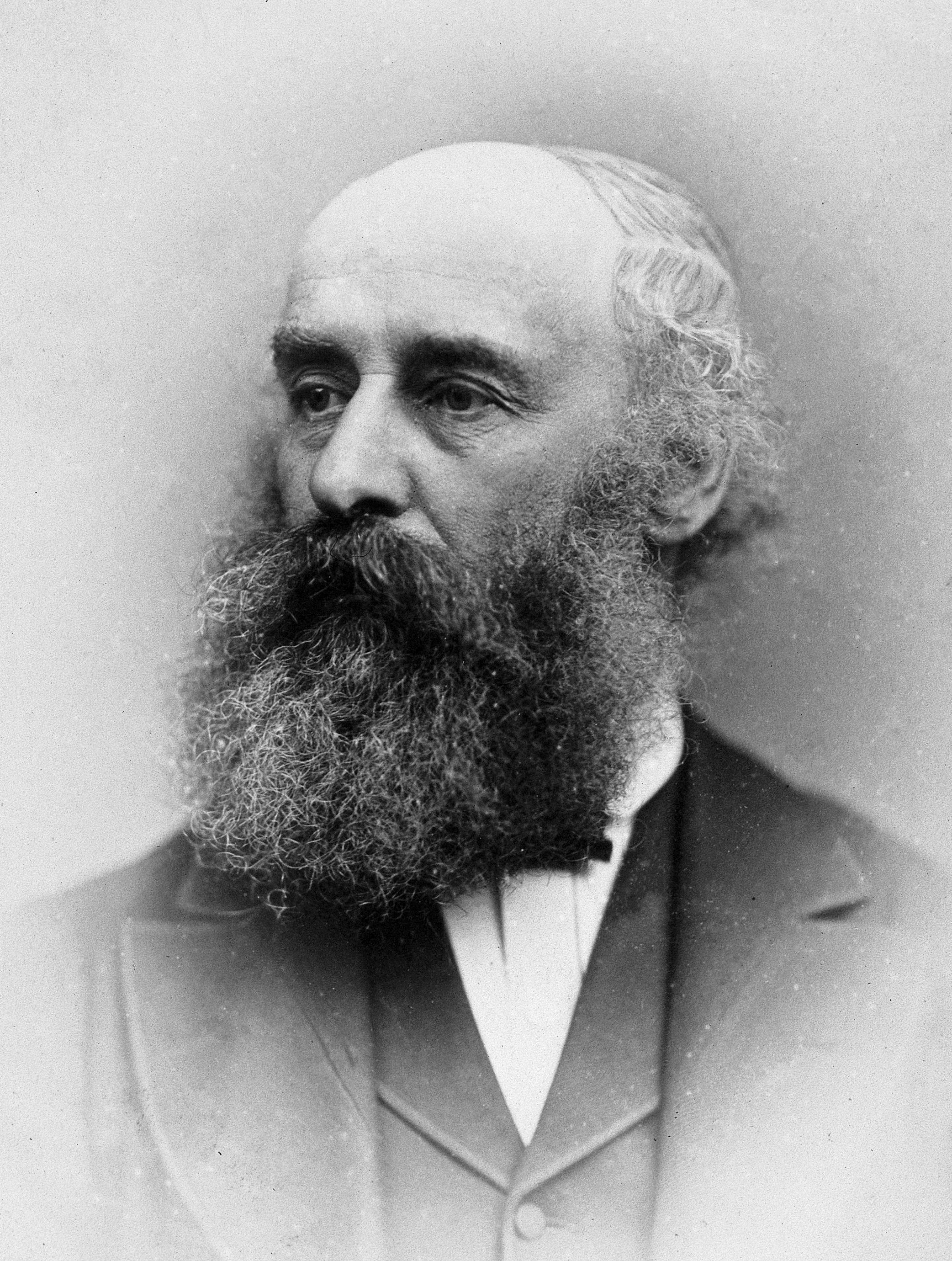
- John Syer Bristowe, 1881 photograph.
- Born: 19 January 1827; Camberwell
- Died: 20 August 1895 (aged 68); Monmouth
- Occupation: Physician
- Known for: treatment of diseases of the nervous system

John Syer Bristowe (1827–1895) was an English physician.

== Life ==
Born in Camberwell on 19 January 1827, he was the eldest son of Mary Chesshyre and her husband, John Syer Bristowe, a medical practitioner in Camberwell. He was educated at Enfield School and King's College School, and entered St Thomas' Hospital as a medical student in 1846. There he won prizes, with the treasurer's gold medal in 1848, and in the same year obtained the gold medal of the Apothecaries' Society for botany. In 1849 he was admitted a member of the Royal College of Surgeons of England, and on 2 August 1849 he received the licence of the Society of Apothecaries. In 1850 he took the degree of MB of the University of London, gaining the scholarship and medal in surgery and the medals in anatomy and materia medica; in 1852 he was admitted MD of London University.

In 1849 he was house surgeon at St Thomas' Hospital, and in the following year he was appointed curator of the museum and pathologist to the hospital. He was elected assistant physician in 1854, and during the next few years he held several teaching posts, being appointed lecturer on botany in 1859, on materia medica in 1860, on general anatomy and physiology in 1865, on pathology in 1870. In 1860 he was elected full physician, and in 1876 he became lecturer on medicine, a post which he held until his retirement in 1892, when he became consulting physician to the hospital.

He served in many posts at the Royal College of Physicians. Elected a fellow in 1858, he was an examiner in medicine in 1869 and 1870. In 1872 he was Croonian lecturer, choosing for his subject Disease and its Medical Treatment; in 1879 he was Lumleian lecturer on The Pathological Relations of Voice and Speech. He was censor in 1876, 1886, 1887, 1888, and senior censor in 1889. He was examiner in medicine at the universities of Oxford and London, at the Royal College of Surgeons, and at the war office. He was also medical officer of health for Camberwell (1856–95), physician to the Commercial Union Assurance Company, and to Westminster School.

In 1881 he was elected Fellow of the Royal Society, and the honorary degree of LLD was conferred upon him at the tercentenary of the University of Edinburgh in 1884. He was president of the Pathological Society of London in 1885, of the Neurological Society in 1891, and of the Medical Society of London in 1893. In that year he delivered the Lettsomian lectures on Syphilitic Affections of the Nervous System. He was also president of the Society of Medical Officers of Health, of the Hospitals Association, and of the metropolitan counties' branch of the British Medical Association. In 1887 his term of office as physician to St Thomas' Hospital having expired, he was appointed for a further term of five years at the request of his colleagues.

Bristowe died on 20 August 1895 at Monmouth, and is buried at Norwood cemetery.

== Legacy ==
A three-quarter-length portrait by his daughter Beatrice M. Bristowe hung in the committee room at St Thomas' Hospital. The bulk of the subscriptions collected on his retirement from St Thomas' Hospital in 1892 was used to found a medal to be awarded for proficiency in the science of pathology.

== Works ==
Bristowe's reputation was as an outstanding teacher of students at the bedside. As a physician he was noted in the diagnosis and treatment of diseases of the nervous system. He communicated to the public health department of the privy council a series of reports:

- On Phosphorus Poisoning in Match Manufacture (1862), first describing phossy jaw;
- On Infection by Rags and Paper Works (1865);
- On the Cattle Plague (1866) with John Burdon Sanderson; and
- On the Hospitals of the United Kingdom with Timothy Holmes. This was an extensive work of 281 pages, Appendix 15 to the Privy Council Medical Officer's Report, London, HMSO, 1863.

Many of the microscopical drawings to be found in his books were his own. In particular his figures of trichina spiralis, a parasitic worm in the muscles of humans, were copied in many textbooks.

Bristowe published also:

- Poems, London, 1850; towards the end of his life he issued another volume of poems for private circulation.
- A Treatise on the Theory and Practice of Medicine, London, 1876; the 7th edition was issued in 1890. This work immediately became one of the main textbooks of medicine for students and practitioners in English-speaking countries.
- Clinical Lectures and Essays on Diseases of the Nervous System, 1888.
- Annual Reports of the Medical Officer of Health to the Vestry of St. Giles, Camberwell, Surrey, London, 1857–82.

Bristowe edited the St. Thomas's Hospital Reports, 1870–76.

== Family ==
Bristowe married, on 9 October 1856, Miriam Isabelle, eldest surviving daughter of Joseph P. Stearns of Dulwich. Together they had five daughters and five sons. The politician Thomas Lynn Bristowe was his brother.

Bristowe is buried at West Norwood Cemetery.
