= Ronald Chamberlain =

British lecturer and politician (1901–1987)

- Ronald Chamberlain in 1947

Member of Parliament for Norwood
- In office 5 July 1945 – 3 February 1950
- Preceded by: Duncan Sandys
- Succeeded by: Sir John Smyth

Personal details
- Born: Ronald Arthur Chamberlain; 19 April 1901
- Died: 12 May 1987 (aged 86)
- Party: Labour
- Spouse(s): Joan Smith McNeill (m. 1924; died 1950) Florence Illingworth (m. 1951)
- Education: Gonville and Caius College, Cambridge

Ronald Arthur Chamberlain (19 April 1901 – 12 May 1987) was a British music lecturer, housing consultant and Labour politician.

== Education and early career ==
Chamberlain was educated at Owen's School, Islington, and Gonville and Caius College, Cambridge, where he gained a lower second in Part I of the Historical Tripos in 1922 and received both Bachelor of Arts and Bachelor of Music (MusB) degrees the following year. Having been awarded a John Stewart of Rannoch Scholarship, he went on to become an Associate of the Royal Academy of Music (ARAM) in 1925. Accomplished on the organ, he was a Fellow of the Royal College of Organists (FRCO) from 1920 and a resident organist at St Clement Danes, London.

Upon coming down from Cambridge, Chamberlain was appointed a lecturer at Chester Training College, and he was also an overseas examiner on behalf of Trinity College of Music in both music and elocution, working in countries such as Canada, New Zealand and Australia. Throughout the 1920s and early 1930s he gave frequent public recitals on piano and organ, including a performance at the Anglican Pro-Cathedral in Buenos Aires that was reportedly the first organ recital in the city for twelve years. In a review of a performance he gave at the Aeolian Hall, The Times described Chamberlain as a "competent pianist" who "would be something more than that if he would develop a more personal style."

In the 1930s, Chamberlain underwent a change of career, emerging first as the secretary of the National Federation of Housing Societies and then, later, as the chief executive officer to the Miners' Welfare Commission.

== Political career ==
=== In parliament ===
Chamberlain joined the Labour Party soon after the First World War. At the 1945 general election, he was the party's candidate for the south London suburban constituency of Norwood. The constituency had been held comfortably by the Conservatives since its creation in 1885, but a landslide in favour of Labour saw Chamberlain elected Member of Parliament, overturning a Conservative majority of 12,456 to win the seat by 2,023 votes. He was appointed parliamentary private secretary to the Minister of Town and Country Planning, Lewis Silkin. Chamberlain was regarded as a "maverick" member on the left wing fringe of the Parliamentary Labour Party. He was disciplined after voting against the signing of the North Atlantic Treaty in 1949. He also controversially accepted an invitation to visit Francoist Spain, returning with favourable reports on the régime. He narrowly avoided de-selection prior to the 1950 general election. When the election was held he was unseated, with the Conservatives regaining the seat.

=== Later years ===
In April 1947 Chamberlain was elected to Middlesex County Council to fill a casual vacancy in the representation of Hendon West. He held the seat until 1952, when he stepped down.

In 1951, he stood for election to the party's National Executive Committee as a Bevanite candidate, without success – although, in a letter to The Times written earlier that year, he claimed he was not a Bevanite nor a sectarian supporter of the Attlee administration, but representative of a "third way" approach that sought, above else, an independent British foreign policy that would "provide a bridge between the ideologies of the United States and the U.S.S.R."

In 1971 he resigned from the Labour Party over its support for trade unions, whose only purpose he claimed was the "continual forcing up of wage rates, regardless of their less fortunate brothers and sisters and equally regardless of the public interest."

Parliament of the United Kingdom
| Preceded by Duncan Sandys | Member of Parliament for Norwood; 1945 – 1950 | Succeeded by John Smyth |
