= Thomas Bristowe =

Thomas Bristow

Member of Parliament for Norwood
- In office 1885 – 6 June 1892
- Preceded by: New creation
- Succeeded by: Ernest Tritton

Personal details
- Born: 31 March 1833
- Died: 6 June 1892 (aged 59) Brockwell Hall, Lambeth, London
- Resting place: West Norwood Cemetery
- Party: Conservative
- Spouse: Frances Ellen Mason

Thomas Lynn Bristowe (31 March 1833 – 6 June 1892) was an English stockbroker and Conservative Party politician.

== Biography ==
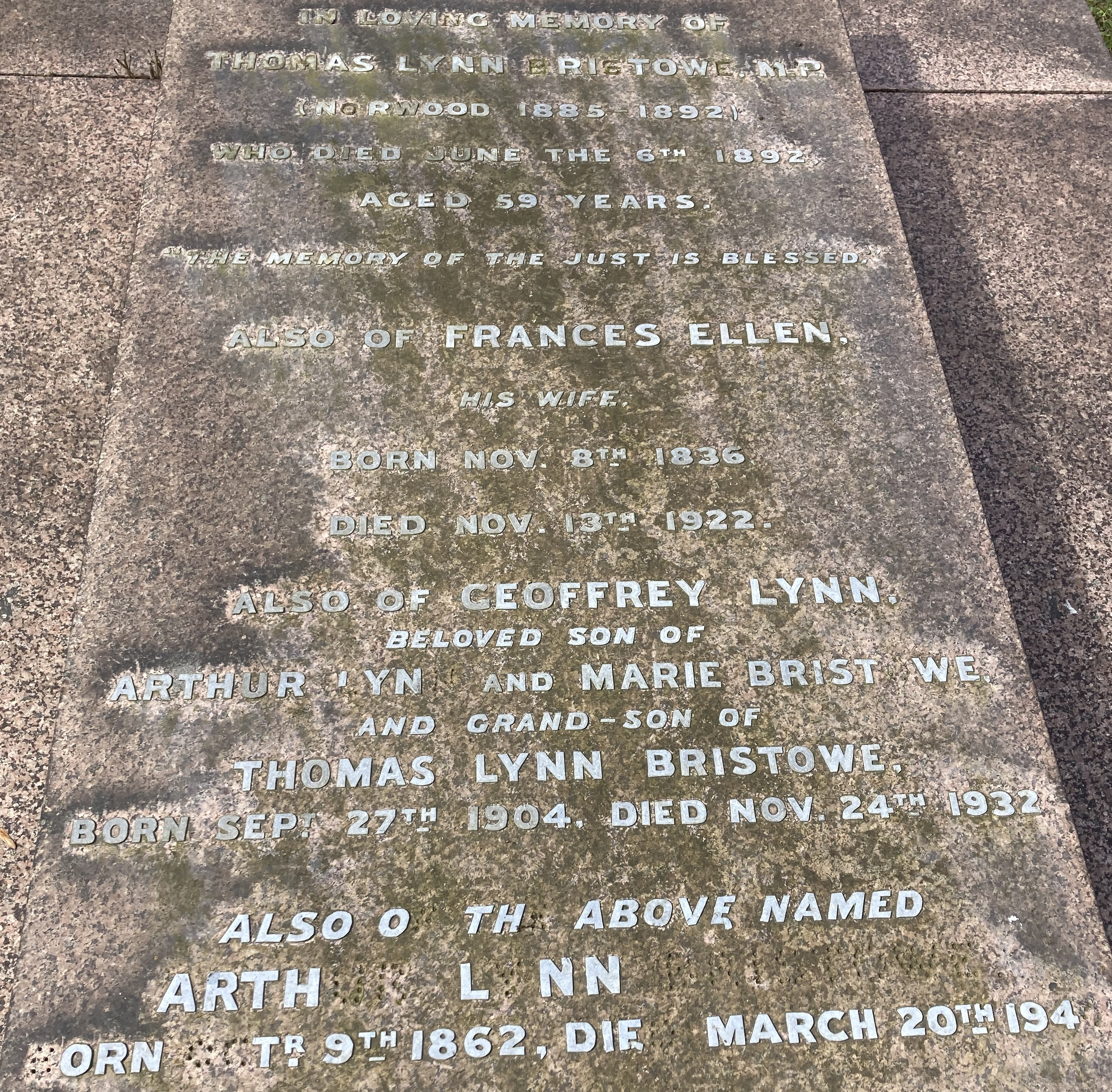
Family grave of Thomas Lynn Bristowe in West Norwood Cemetery

Bristowe was the third son of John Syer Bristowe, a doctor of Camberwell, and his wife Mary Chesshyre of Rock Savage, Cheshire. He was educated privately and became a stockbroker. He was a partner in the firm of Bristowe Brothers of the London Stock Exchange.

In 1885, Bristowe was elected Member of Parliament for Norwood. Bristowe was very active in a campaign to raise funds to restore Brockwell Hall, a part of Brockwell Park which had come into the ownership of Lambeth Council. However, he died of a heart attack on the steps of Brockwell Hall during the grand opening ceremony in June 1892, aged 59.

Bristowe married Frances Ellen Mason in 1857. They lived at Dulwich Hill House, Denmark Hill, Surrey. Bristowe was buried at the West Norwood Cemetery.

Parliament of the United Kingdom
New constituency	Member of Parliament for Norwood; 1885 – 1892	Succeeded by Ernest Tritton
