= George Bowles (Conservative politician) =

British lawyer and politician (1877–1955)

George Frederic Stewart Bowles (17 November 1877 – 1 January 1955) was a British Conservative Party politician and barrister.

Bowles was born on 17 November 1877, the son of Thomas Gibson Bowles of London, an MP and the founder of the magazines The Lady and Vanity Fair. He was educated at Farnborough School, Hampshire, before entering the Royal Navy in 1891. He resigned his Commission in 1897 and went to Trinity College, Cambridge, where he graduated BA in 1901 and MA in 1905. While at Cambridge he was President of the Cambridge Union.

He was admitted to the Inner Temple in 1898, and called to the Bar in 1901 whereupon he practised in the Admiralty Court for a few years. He was the Member of Parliament (MP) for Norwood from 1906 to 1910.

Bowles married Madeline Mary Tobin (born in 1893 at Hanover Square, Westminster) in 1922; they had two children. He died in Malta on 1 January 1955.

Parliament of the United Kingdom
Preceded by Sir Ernest Tritton	Member of Parliament for Norwood; 1906–Jan 1910	Succeeded by Harry Samuel
