= Joseph Tritton =

- Born: 1819
- Died: 1887 (aged 67–68)
- Occupation: Banker
- Spouse: Amelia Hanson
- Children: Joseph Herbert Tritton; Sir Ernest Tritton, 1st Baronet; 3 daughters
- Parent(s): Henry Tritton and Amelia Benwell

Joseph Tritton (1819–1887) was a British Quaker banker.

== Early life ==
Joseph Tritton was born in 1819. He was the son of Henry Tritton and Amelia Benwell.

== Career ==
Tritton was a partner in Barclay, Bevan, Tritton & Co (now Barclays Bank) for forty years.

== Philanthropy ==
He was Treasurer of the Baptist Foreign Missionary Society and wrote hymns and poems.

== Personal life ==
On 8 November 1843, he married Amelia Hanson, daughter of Joseph Hanson, and they had five children:

- Joseph Herbert Tritton (1844-1923)
- Sir Ernest Tritton, 1st Baronet (1845-1918)
- Annette Amelia Tritton (1847-1873), married William Leatham Barclay, the son of Joseph Gurney Barclay.
- Jessie Margaret Tritton (1857-1943), never married
- Ethel Harriett Tritton (1859-1885), never married

== Death ==
He died in 1887.
