= Herbert Leslie Melville Tritton =

British banker (1870–1940)

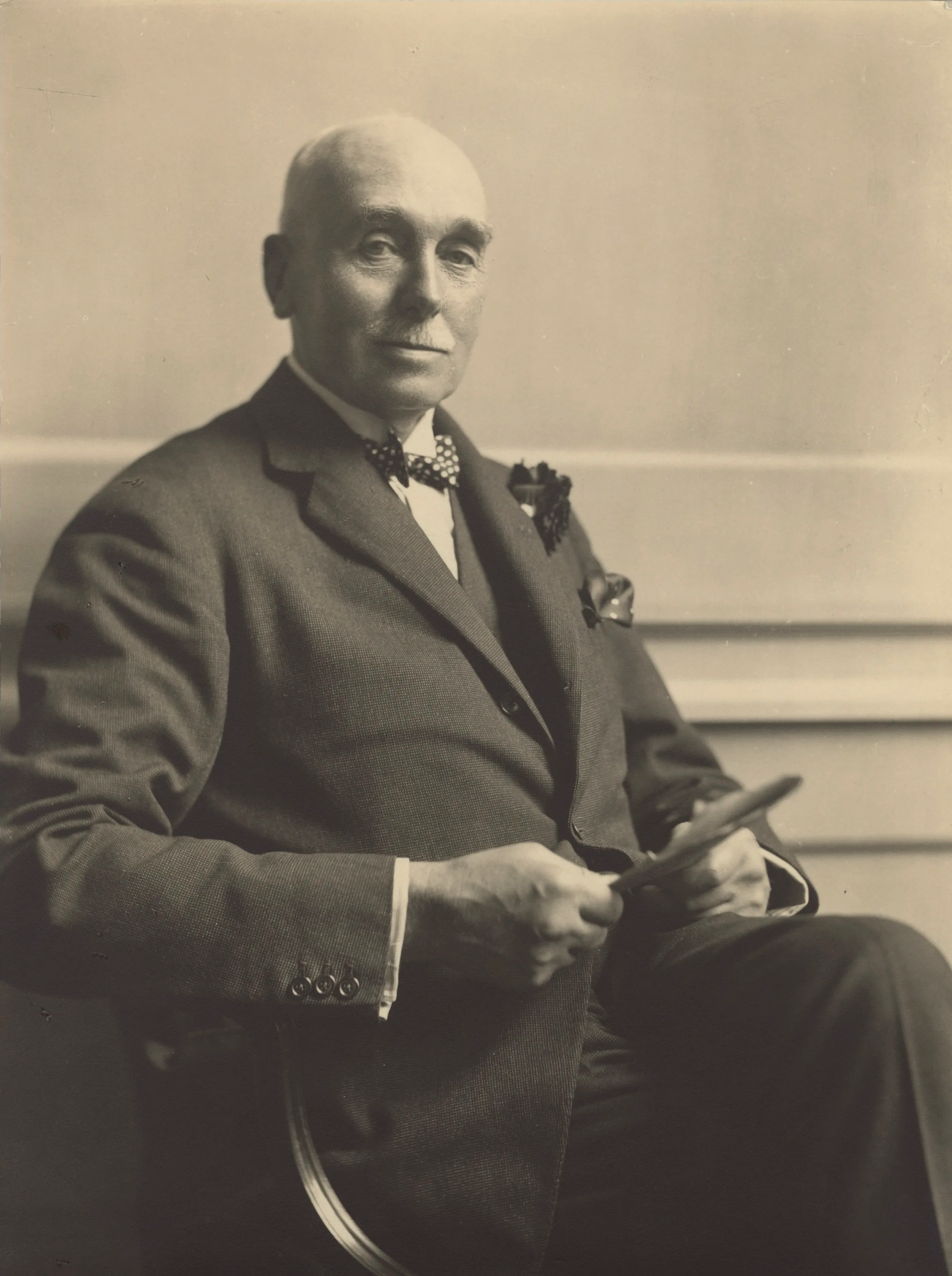
Portrait by Olive Edis, c. 1925

Major Herbert Leslie Melville Tritton (1870-1940), was a British banker.

== Early life ==
Herbert Leslie Melville Tritton was born 20 December 1870. He was the son of the banker Joseph Herbert Tritton.

== Career ==
Tritton was the president of The Equitable Life Assurance Society from 1930 to 1940. He was also a director of Barclays Bank and chairman of Barclays Bank International from 1934 to 1937.

He was High Sheriff of Essex from 1933 to 1934.

== Personal life ==
He married Gertrude Susan Gosset. They had four children:

- Lucy Constance Tritton (1895-?)
- Marjorie Gertrude Tritton (1897-?)
- Ralph Leslie Tritton (1900-1929)
- George Henton Tritton (1905-1934)

== Death ==
He died on 21 November 1940.
