= Tritton baronets =

Baronetcy in the Baronetage of the United Kingdom

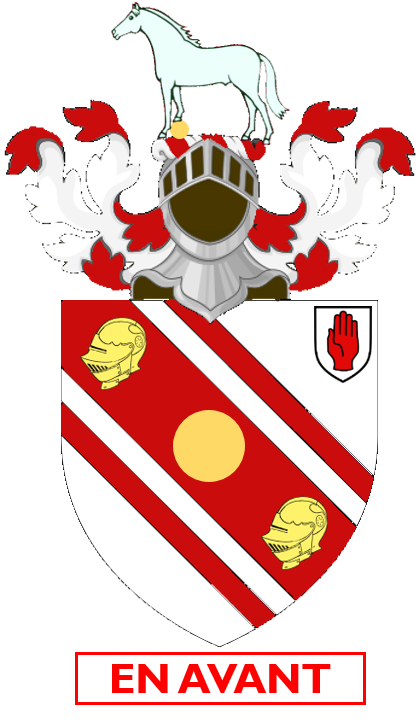
The arms of the Tritton baronets

The Tritton baronetcy, of Bloomfield in the Metropolitan Borough of Lambeth in the County of London, is a title in the Baronetage of the United Kingdom. It was created on 1 August 1905 for Ernest Tritton, Conservative Member of Parliament for Norwood from 1892 to 1906.

== Tritton baronets, of Bloomfield (1905) ==
- Sir (Charles) Ernest Tritton, 1st Baronet (1845–1918)
- Sir Alfred Ernest Tritton, 2nd Baronet (1873–1939)
- Sir Geoffrey Ernest Tritton, 3rd Baronet (1900–1976)
- Sir Anthony John Ernest Tritton, 4th Baronet (1927–2012)
- Sir Jeremy Ernest Tritton, 5th Baronet (born 1961)

As of 2026, there is no heir to the title.

== Notes ==
Baronetage of the United Kingdom
Preceded by Stern baronets	Tritton baronets of Bloomfield; 1 August 1905	Succeeded by Wernher baronets
