= Saratov electoral district =

Constituency of the Russian Republic

Saratov
- Former Civilian constituency for the All-Russian Constituent Assembly
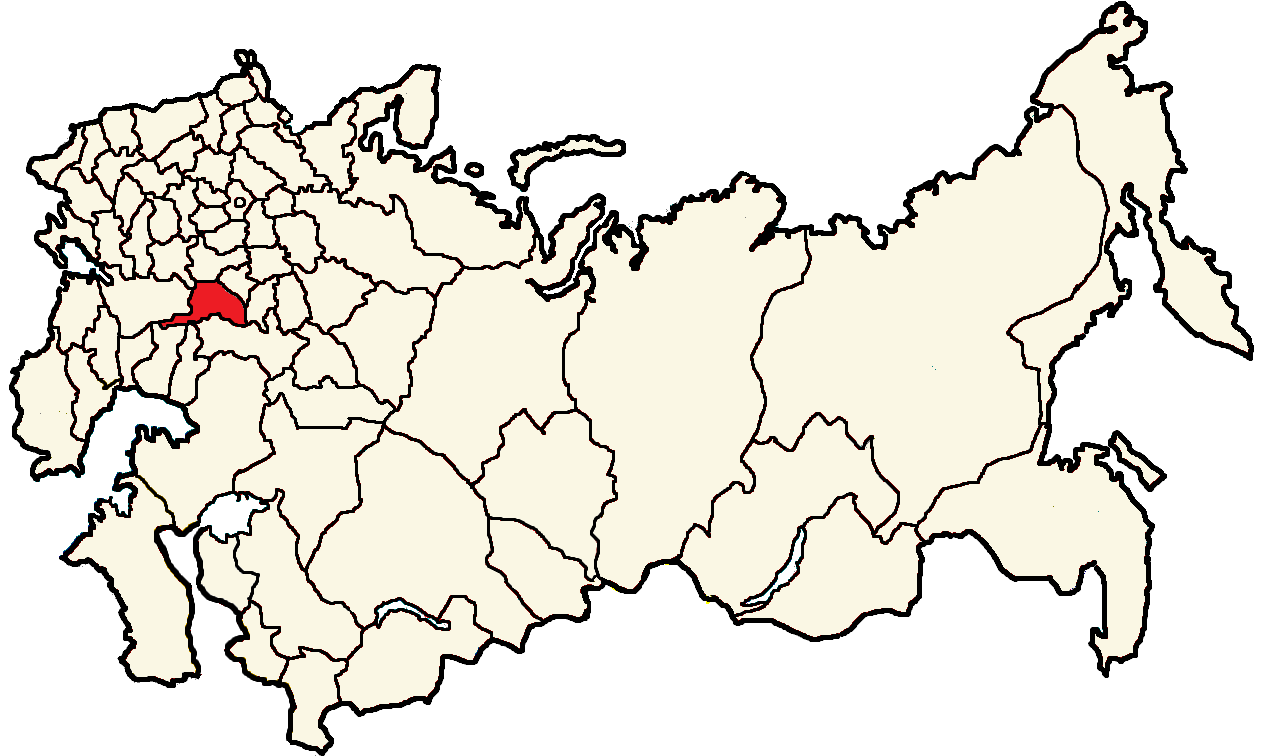

Former constituency
- Created: 1917
- Abolished: 1918
- Number of members: 15
- Number of Uyezd Electoral Commissions: 10
- Number of Urban Electoral Commissions: 2
- Number of Parishes: 291

The Saratov electoral district (Russian: Саратовский избирательный округ) was a constituency created for the 1917 Russian Constituent Assembly election.

The electoral district covered the Saratov Governorate. Saratov had been one of the early strongholds of the SRs Kerensky was one of the SR candidates, but many voters scratched his name from the list (and thus made their votes invalid). was politically turbulent, also during the election. In Saratov Bolshevik campaigners were frequently attacked by rich farmers. Whilst the SR won in the largely agrarian district, the Bolsheviks had a strong showing with strong support from soldiers and from the industrial city of Tsaritsyn. Khvalynsk uezd was an Old Believer stronghold, with presence of Khlysty and Skoptsky sects.

The German socialists didn't field a list in Saratov, whilst the German Central Committee contested on the Volga German List 7.

In Saratov town the Bolsheviks finished in first place with 22,712 votes (37.7%), followed by the SRs with 8,698 votes (14.5%), the Kadets 11,971 votes (19.9%), the Mensheviks 4,100 votes (6.8%), Popular Socialists 2,920 votes (4.9%), the Society for Faith and Order 2,589 votes (4.3%), the Orthodox list 1,924 votes (3.2%), Landowners 1,764 votes (2.9%), Germans 1,280 votes (2.1%), the Ukrainian-Tatar SR list 1,097 votes (1.8%), Old Believers 1,003 votes (1.7%) and 116 votes (0.2%) for the Peasants of Petrovsk uezd and Mordva.

In Tsaritsyn 32,984 votes were cast; 16,613 for the Bolsheviks, 4,468 for the SRs, 2,889 for the Kadets and 2,669 for the Mensheviks.

== Results ==
Saratov
Party	Vote	%	Seats
List 12 - Socialist-Revolutionaries and the Soviet of Peasants Deputies	612,094	56.28	11
List 10 - Bolsheviks	261,308	24.03	4
List 3 - Union of Ukrainian Peasants, Ukrainian Refugees and the Organization of Tatar Socialist Revolutionaries	53,445	4.91	
List 7 - Volga Germans	50,025	4.60	
List 1 - Kadets	27,226	2.50	
List 5 - Orthodox People's Party	17,414	1.60	
List 2 - Mensheviks	15,152	1.39	
List 4 - Russian People's Party of Christians-Old Believers	13,956	1.28	
List 6 - Union of Landowners	13,804	1.27	
List 8 - Popular Socialists	10,243	0.94	
List 9 - Society for Faith and Order	6,600	0.61	
List 11 - Peasants of Petrovsk uezd and Mordva Population	6,379	0.59	
Total:	1,087,646		15

Deputies Elected
Antonov	Bolshevik
Milutin	Bolshevik
Minin	Bolshevik
Vasiliev	Bolshevik
Bykhovsky	SR
Chernavin	SR
Chernenkov	SR
Kerensky	SR
Kotov	SR
Minin	SR
Panchurin	SR
Rakitnikov	SR
Ulyanov	SR
Ustinov	SR
Zatonsky	SR
