= Sir John Smyth, 1st Baronet =

English officer and politician (1893–1983)

Brigadier The Right Honourable Sir John Smyth Bt VC MC
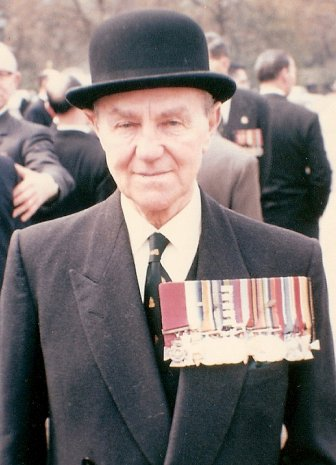
- Smyth c. 1973

Member of Parliament for Norwood
- In office 23 February 1950 – 10 March 1966
- Preceded by: Ronald Arthur Chamberlain
- Succeeded by: John Fraser

Personal details
- Born: John George Smyth; 24 October 1893 Teignmouth, Devon, England
- Died: 26 April 1983 (aged 89) Marylebone, London, England
- Resting place: Golders Green Cemetery
- Party: Conservative
- Education: Royal Military College, Sandhurst
- Nickname: "Jackie"
- Military career
- Allegiance: United Kingdom; British India
- Branch: British Army; British Indian Army
- Service years: 1912–1942
- Rank: Brigadier
- Service number: 49726
- Units: 15th Ludhiana Sikhs; 11th Sikh Regiment
- Commands: 17th Indian Infantry Division; 19th Indian Infantry Division; 36th Indian Infantry Brigade; 127th Infantry Brigade
- Conflicts: First World War; Third Anglo-Afghan War; North-West Frontier; First Waziristan Campaign; Second Mohmand Campaign; Second World War
- Awards: Victoria Cross; Military Cross; Mentioned in Despatches (6); Order of St. George 4th class (Russia)
- Other work: Privy counsellor Member of Parliament

Brigadier Sir John George Smyth, 1st Baronet, VC, MC, PC (24 October 1893 – 26 April 1983), often known as Jackie Smyth, was a British Indian Army officer and a Conservative Member of Parliament. During WWII, he led a unit in France and during the evacuation of Dunkirk, and in the Burma campaign. Although a recipient of the Victoria Cross, his military career ended in controversy.

== Early life and education ==
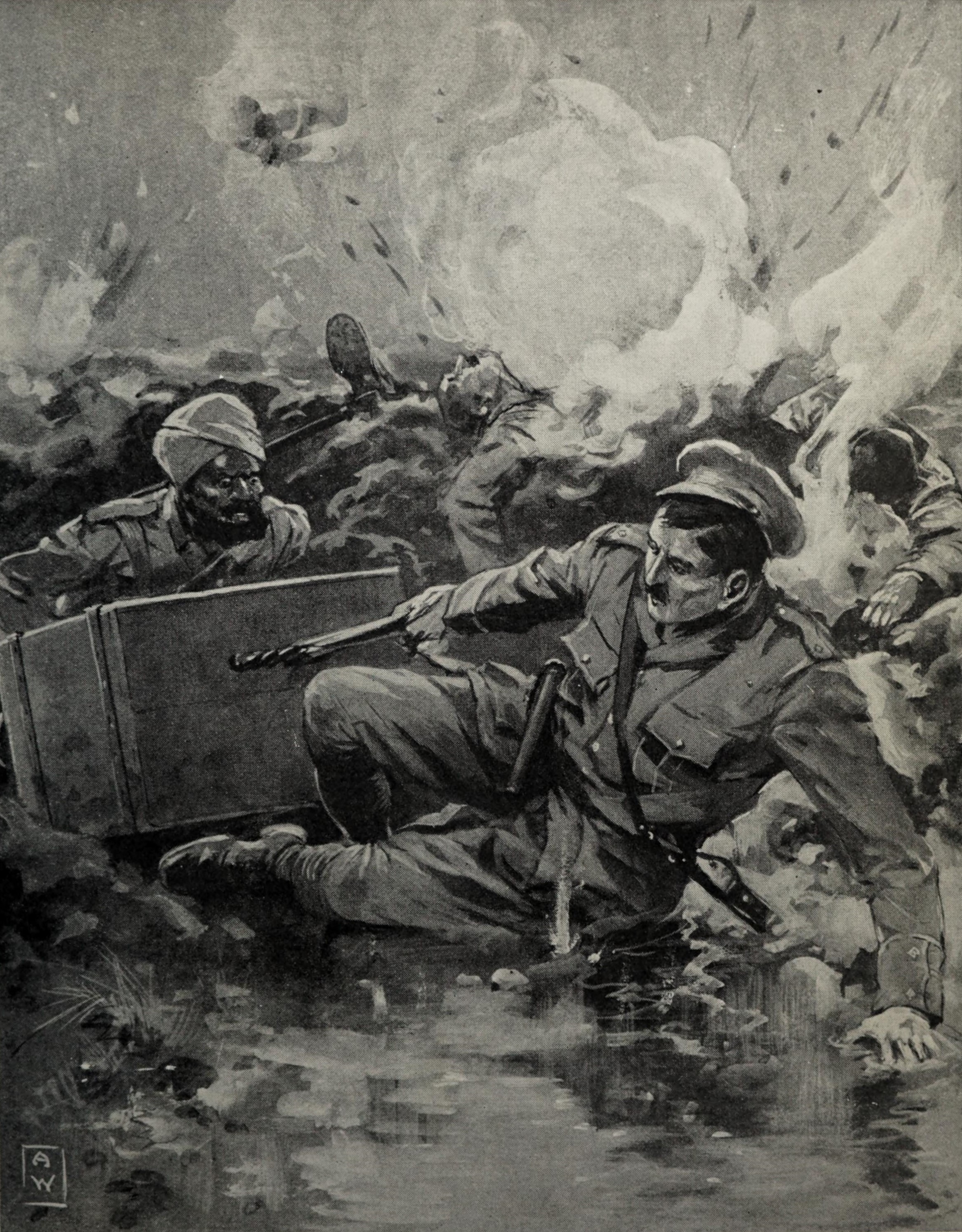
Drawing of Lieutenant Smyth's VC action, from The War Illustrated, August 1915

Smyth was born in 1893 in Teignmouth, Devon, the son of William John Smyth (1869–1893), a member of the Indian Civil Service, and Lilian May Clifford. His grandfather was Army officer Henry Smyth, who was the second son of John Henry Smyth (1780–1822), of Heath Hall, Wakefield, Yorkshire, a Whig MP for Cambridge University (1812–1822) and Lady Elizabeth Anne FitzRoy, daughter of George FitzRoy, 4th Duke of Grafton. His great-uncle John George Smyth was an MP for the City of York.

Smyth was educated at Dragon School, Repton, and the Royal Military College, Sandhurst.

== Military career ==
After passing out from Sandhurst, Smyth was commissioned as a second lieutenant on the unattached list for the British Indian Army on 24 August 1912, and was commissioned into the 15th Ludhiana Sikhs on 5 November 1913. He was promoted to lieutenant on 24 November 1914, three months after the outbreak of the First World War.

He was 21 years old, and a lieutenant in the 15th Ludhiana Sikhs, 3rd (Lahore) Division, Indian Army during the First World War, when his actions earned him the Victoria Cross (VC). In June 1915, Smyth was awarded the VC, the United Kingdom's highest award for bravery in combat. The citation for this award, published in the London Gazette read:

For most conspicuous bravery near Richebourg L'Avoue on 18 May 1915. With a bombing party of 10 men, who voluntarily undertook this duty, he conveyed a supply of 96 bombs to within 20 yards of the enemy's position over exceptionally dangerous ground, after the attempts of two other parties had failed. Lieutenant Smyth succeeded in taking the bombs to the desired position with the aid of two of his men (the other eight having been killed or wounded), and to effect his purpose he had to swim a stream, being exposed the whole time to howitzer, shrapnel, machine-gun and rifle fire.

As well as Smyth's VC, the Indian Distinguished Service Medal was posthumously awarded to the men killed during this incident. Smyth was also awarded the Russian Order of St. George, Fourth Class, in 1915, and was promoted to captain on 24 August 1916.

Smyth continued his war service in Egypt and on the North-West Frontier.

== Between the wars ==
In September 1920, when brigade major of the 43rd Indian Brigade, Smyth was awarded the Military Cross (MC) for distinguished service in the field in Waziristan. The citation for this award, published in the London Gazette, read:

For gallantry and initiative at Khajuri, Tochi Valley, on the 22nd October, 1919, when, having been sent forward from Idak to clear up the situation, his quick appreciation, dispositions and leadership averted a serious disaster and contributed largely towards the saving of a valuable convoy attacked by the enemy. He showed great gallantry under heavy fire, inspired his command, and brought the convoy safely to Idak.

In 1923, while serving in India, Smyth played two first-class cricket matches for the Europeans team.

Returning to England, he attended the Staff College, Camberley from 1923 to 1924, and his fellow students included numerous men who would later achieve high command, including Arthur Percival, Dudley Johnson (a fellow VC recipient), Arthur Wakely, Colville Wemyss, Montagu Stopford, John Halsted, Frederick Pile, Gordon Macready, Roderic Petre, Alastair MacDougall, Edmond Schreiber, Michael Gambier-Parry, Richard Dewing, Leslie Hill, Kenneth Loch, Douglas Pratt, Balfour Hutchison, Robert Pargiter, Robert Stone and Henry Verschoyle-Campbell along with Horace Robertson of the Australian Army and Harry Crerar and Georges Vanier of the Canadian Army. Smyth received a brevet promotion to major on 1 January 1928, receiving the substantive promotion to major on 24 August 1929. By this time, he was a General Staff Officer Grade 3 (GSO3) with the 3rd Battalion, 11th Sikh Regiment, an appointment he vacated on 22 November 1929. An early appointment as the Indian Army instructor at the Staff College, Camberley in 1930 further indicated that Smyth's career was on the fast track, borne out by his appointment as a GSO2 at the Staff College on 16 January 1931, with the local rank of lieutenant colonel. He received a brevet promotion to lieutenant colonel on 1 July 1933, and relinquished his appointment at the Staff College on 16 January 1934.

On 16 July 1936, Smyth was promoted to the substantive rank of lieutenant colonel, an illustration of how rapidly his career had thus far progressed. He managed to persuade General Lord Gort, then the Chief of the Imperial General Staff (CIGS) and a former instructor at the Staff College in the mid-1920s, as well as being another fellow VC recipient, to give him an undertaking that he would be given a brigade to command in the United Kingdom should hostilities break out.

== Second World War ==
Having managed to engineer leave from India to the United Kingdom in the summer of 1939, shortly before the outbreak of the Second World War, he called in his debt but was disappointed to be seconded to a United Kingdom-based staff job, as GSO1 of the 2nd London Division, a second-line Territorial Army (TA) formation, then commanded by Major General Harry Willans, which had only recently been formed.

In February 1940, after further lobbying, Smyth was appointed to command the 127th Infantry Brigade. His brigade major was Charles Phibbs Jones, later to become a full general. The brigade was one of three which formed part of the 42nd (East Lancashire) Infantry Division, another TA formation, then commanded by Major General William Holmes, which from April he led in France as part of the British Expeditionary Force (BEF). After the evacuation from Dunkirk in late May, he continued to command the brigade in Britain until he was summoned to return to India in March 1941. He was promoted to colonel on 23 December 1940.

After briefly commanding 36th Indian Infantry Brigade in Quetta and a period of sick leave, Smyth took command of 19th Indian Infantry Division as an acting major general in October, but was reassigned to command 17th Indian Infantry Division in December. Controversy surrounds his handling of the 17th Indian Division in February 1942, during its retreat across the Sittang River in Burma. It was said that he failed to expedite a strong bridgehead on the enemy's side of the river and was forced, when it came under threat from the Japanese, to order the blowing of the bridge while two-thirds of his division were still on the far side with no other means of crossing the river and therefore dooming them. Seventeen Division were the only formation standing between the Japanese and Rangoon, and this loss, therefore, led directly to the loss of Rangoon and Lower Burma. The Commander-in-Chief, India, General Sir Archibald Wavell, was furious and sacked Smyth on the spot.

There is also a degree of controversy about Smyth's behaviour as regards his health in this period. He had not recovered from surgery for an anal fistula, which must have caused him significant, and possibly distracting, discomfort, yet managed to be recommended as fit to stay in command by a medical board presided over by the senior doctor in his own division.

Smyth received no further posts and returned to the United Kingdom to retire with the substantive rank of colonel and the honorary rank of brigadier. It took 16 years and revision of the official history before his version of the affair versus that of General Hutton, his corps commander, was published. Smyth's book, Milestones, 1979, gives his version in which he claims that he had made representations to General Hutton 10 days previously recommending a withdrawal to the west bank of the Sittang River, thus permitting a strong defence line to be established. His recommendation was allegedly refused.

== Postwar career ==
Smyth went into politics and stood unsuccessfully against Ernest Bevin in Wandsworth Central at the 1945 general election. At the 1950 election, he defeated the sitting Labour MP for Norwood, Ronald Chamberlain. He was made a baronet on 23 January 1956 with the style Sir John George Smyth, VC, MC, 1st Baronet Smyth of Teignmouth in the County of Devon and a privy counsellor in 1962. He retired from Parliament at the 1966 general election; as of 2015, he was the last VC recipient to sit in the Commons.

Smyth was also an author, a playwright, a journalist and a broadcaster. His two brothers were distinguished soldiers, one of whom also became a brigadier. He married twice: firstly Margaret Dundas on 22 July 1920, later dissolved, with whom he had three sons and a daughter; and then Frances Chambers on 12 April 1940. One of his sons, Captain John Lawrence Smyth of the 1st Battalion, Queen's Royal Regiment (West Surrey), was killed on 7 May 1944, during the first attack on Jail Hill at the Battle of Kohima.

Smyth was cremated at Golders Green Crematorium. His Victoria Cross is displayed at the Imperial War Museum.

One of Brigadier Smyth's uniforms is on display at the armoury of the Artillery Company of Newport in Newport, Rhode Island, USA.

Smyth was a cat lover and wrote three books on cats, Beloved Cats (Frederick Muller, 1963), Blue Magnolia (Frederick Muller, 1964) and Ming: The Story of a Cat Family (Frederick Muller, 1966).

== Bibliography ==
- Defence is Our Business (Hutchinson, nd)
- The Western Defences (Allan Wingate, 1951)
- Lawn Tennis (Batsford, 1953)
- The Game's the Same: Lawn Tennis in the World of Sport (Cassell, 1956)
- Before the Dawn: A Story of Two Historic Retreats (Cassell, 1957) Dunkirk & Burma
- Paradise Island (Max Parrish, 1958)
- Trouble in Paradise (Max Parrish, 1959)
- The Only Enemy: An Autobiography (Hutchinson, 1959)
- Ann Goes Hunting (Max Parrish, 1960)
- Sandhurst (Weidenfeld & Nicolson, 1961)
- The Victoria Cross 1856–1964 (Frederick Muller, 1963; reprinted 1965)
- Beloved Cats (Frederick Muller, 1963)
- Blue Magnolia (Frederick Muller, 1964)
- Behind the Scenes at Wimbledon (Collins, 1965) as told by Colonel Duncan Macaulay
- The Rebellious Rani (Frederick Muller, 1966)
- Ming: The Story of a Cat Family (Frederick Muller, 1966)
- Bolo Whistler: The Life of General Sir Lashmer Whistler; A Study in Leadership (Frederick Muller, 1967)
- The Story of the George Cross (Arthur Barker, 1968)
- In This Sign Conquer: The Story of the Army Chaplains (Mowbray & Co., 1968)
- The Valiant (Mowbray & Co., 1970)
- The Will to Live: The Story of Dame Margot Turner D.B.E., R.R.C. (Cassell, 1970)
- Jean Borotra: The Bounding Basque (Stanley Paul, 1974)
- Leadership in War, 1939–45: Generals in Victory and Defeat (David & Charles, 1974)
- Leadership in Battle 1914–1918: Commanders in Action (David & Charles, 1975)
- Great Stories of the Victoria Cross (Arthur Barker, 1977)
- Milestones: A Memoir (Sidgwick & Jackson, 1979)

== Footnotes ==
Military offices
New title	GOC 19th Indian Infantry Division; October−December 1941	Succeeded by Geoffry Scoones
Preceded by Harold Lewis	GOC 17th Indian Infantry Division; 1941−1942	Succeeded by David Cowan
Parliament of the United Kingdom
Preceded by Ronald Arthur Chamberlain	Member of Parliament for Norwood; 1950–1966	Succeeded by John Fraser
Baronetage of the United Kingdom
New creation	Baronet (of Teignmouth); 1956–1983	Succeeded by Timothy John Smyth
