= Anglo-Normans =

Medieval ruling class in England

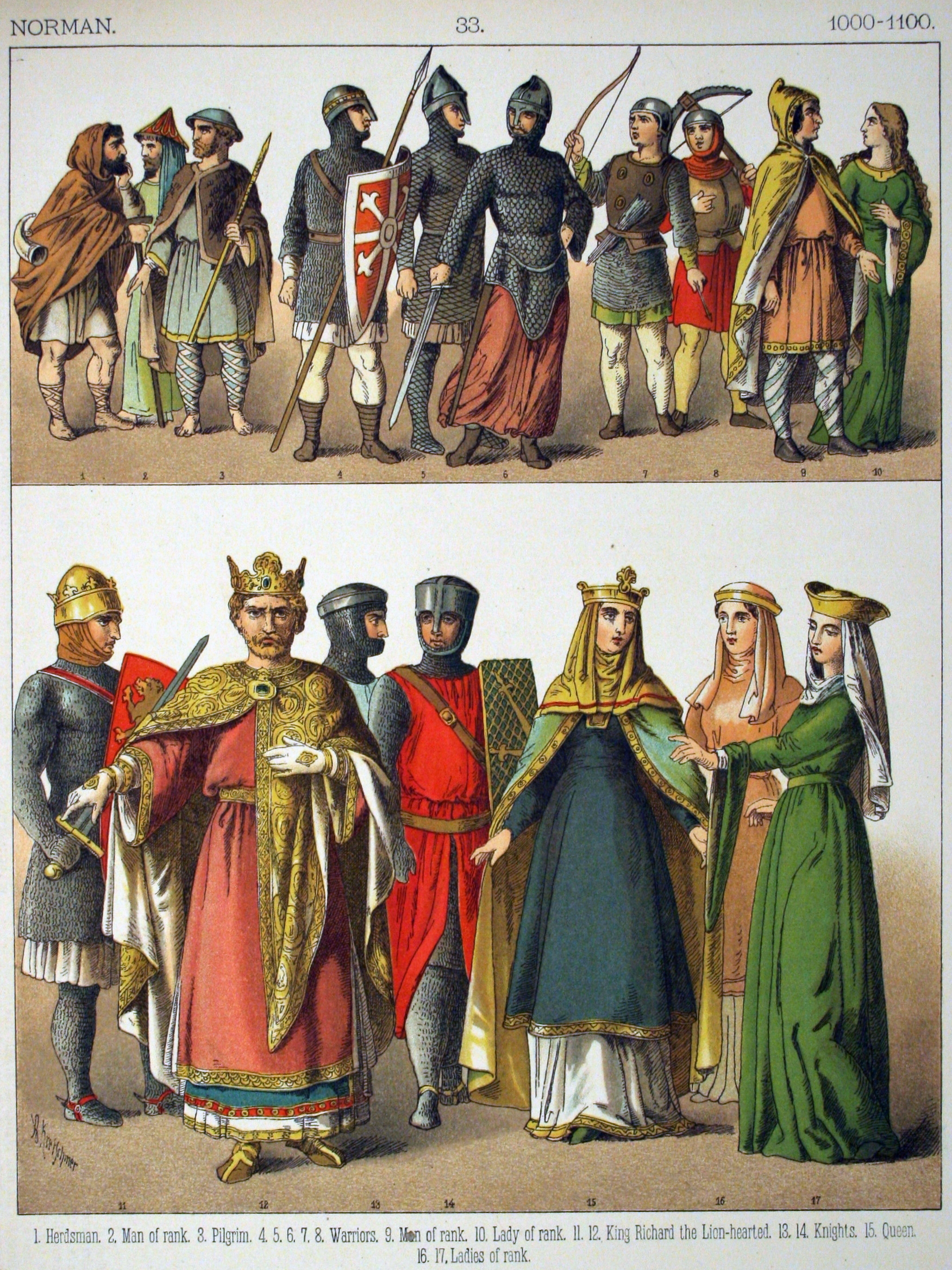
- Examples of Anglo-Norman elite

Languages
- Old Norman; Old French; Old/Middle Breton; Old/Middle English; Anglo-Norman

Religion
- Christianity

Related ethnic groups
- Anglo-Saxons; British people; Celtic Britons; Irish-Scotsmen; Normans; French; Bretons; Norse; Norse-Gaels; Gaels; Gallo-Romans; Franks; Danes; Norwegians; Swedes; Jèrriais; Guernésiais; Anglo-Irish; Irish; Scots-Irish; Scotsmen; English; Welsh; Irish-Normans; Scots-Normans; Welsh-Normans

The Anglo-Normans (Norman: Anglo-Normaunds, Old English: Engel-Norðmandisca) were the medieval ruling class in the Kingdom of England following the Norman Conquest. They were primarily a multiethnic combination of Normans, Bretons, Frenchmen, Flemings, Anglo-Saxons and Celtic Britons.

After the conquest the victorious Normans formed a ruling class in England, distinct from (although intermarrying with) the native Anglo-Saxon and Celtic populations. Over time, their language evolved from the continental Old Norman to the distinct Anglo-Norman language. Anglo-Normans quickly established control over all of England, as well as parts of Wales (the Welsh-Normans). After 1130, parts of southern and eastern Scotland came under Anglo-Norman rule (the Scots-Normans), in return for their support of David I's conquest. The Anglo-Norman invasion of Ireland from 1169 saw Anglo-Normans and Cambro-Normans conquer swaths of Ireland, becoming the Irish-Normans.

The composite expression regno Norman-Anglorum for the Anglo-Norman kingdom that comprises Normandy and England appears contemporaneously only in the Hyde Chronicle.

== Norman conquest ==
A small number of Normans had earlier befriended future Anglo-Saxon king of England, Edward the Confessor, during his exile in his mother's homeland of Normandy in northern France. When he returned to England, some of them went with him; as such, there were Normans already settled in England before the conquest. Edward's successor, Harold Godwinson, was defeated by Duke William the Conqueror of Normandy at the Battle of Hastings, leading to William's accession to the English throne.

After the Norman Conquest of 1066, many of the Anglo-Saxon nobles lost lands and titles; the lesser thegns and others found themselves dispossessed of lands and titles. A number of free geburs had their rights and court access much decreased, becoming unfree villeins, despite the fact that this status did not exist in Normandy itself (compared to other "French" regions). At the same time, many of the new Norman and Northern-France magnates were distributed lands by the King that had been taken from the English nobles. Some of these magnates used their original French-derived names, with the prefix 'de,' meaning they were lords of the old fiefs in France, and some instead dropped their original names and took their names from new English holdings.

The Norman conquest of England brought Britain and Ireland into the orbit of the European continent, especially what remained of Roman-influenced language and culture. The England emerging from the Conquest owed a debt to the Romance languages and the culture of ancient Rome. It transmitted itself in the emerging feudal world that took its place. That heritage can be discerned in language, incorporating the French language and the Roman past, and in the emerging Romanesque (Norman) architecture.

== Military influence ==
The Norman conquest of England also signalled a revolution in military styles and methods. A lot of the old Anglo-Saxon military elite began to emigrate, especially the generation next younger to that defeated at Hastings, who had no particular future in a country controlled by the conquerors. William (and his son, William Rufus), encouraged them to leave, as a security measure. The first to leave went mostly to Denmark and many of these moved on to join the Varangian Guard in Constantinople. The Anglo-Saxons as a whole, for practical reason, however were not demilitarised. Instead, William arranged for the Saxon infantry to be trained up by Norman cavalry in anti-cavalry tactics. This led quickly to the establishment of an Anglo-Norman army made up of Norman horsemen of noble blood, Saxon infantrymen often of equally noble blood, assimilated English freemen as rank-and-file, and foreign mercenaries and adventurers from other parts of the Continent. The younger Norman aristocracy showed a tendency towards Anglicisation, adopting such Saxon styles as long hair and moustaches, upsetting the older generation. (The Anglo-Saxon cniht did not take the sense of the French chevalier before the latest period of Middle English. John Wycliffe (1380s) uses the term knyytis generically for men-at-arms, and only in the 15th century did the word acquire the overtones of a noble cavalryman corresponding to the meaning of chevalier). The Anglo-Norman conquest in the 12th century brought Norman customs and culture to Ireland.

== Norman-Saxon conflict ==
The degree of subsequent Norman-Saxon conflict (as a matter of conflicting social identities) is a question disputed by historians. The 19th-century view was of intense mutual resentment, reflected in the popular legends of Robin Hood and the novel Ivanhoe by Sir Walter Scott. Some residual ill-feeling is suggested by contemporary historian Orderic Vitalis, who in Ecclesiastical Historii (1125) wrote in praise of native English resistance to "William the Bastard" (William I of England). In addition, a fine called the "murdrum", originally introduced to English law by the Danes under Canute, was revived, imposing on villages a high (46 mark/~£31) fine for the secret killing of a Norman (or an unknown person who was, under the murdrum laws, presumed to be Norman unless proven otherwise).

In order to secure Norman loyalty during his conquest, William I rewarded his loyal followers by taking English land and redistributing it to his knights, officials, and the Norman aristocracy. In turn, the English hated him, but the king retaliated ruthlessly with his military force to subdue the rebellions and discontentment. Mike Ashley writes on this subject; "he [William I] may have conquered them [the English], but he never ruled them". Not all of the Anglo-Saxons immediately accepted him as their legitimate king.

As noble families increasingly divided their landholdings between England and Normandy, cross-Channel ties weakened. By the 1170s and 1180s, nobles living in England, regardless of origin, identified themselves as English and set themselves apart from foreign-born royal ministers such as William de Longchamp, Philip Mark, and Engelard de Cigogné, who were seen as aliens. King John and King Henry III's frequent appointment of Poitevin and Savoyard nobles became a focal point for the polarisation between English-born and foreign-born.

Whatever the level of dispute, over time, the two populations intermarried and merged. This began soon after the conquest. Tenants-in-chief following the conquest who married English women included Geofrey de la Guerche, Walter of Dounai and Robert d'Oilly. Other Norman aristocrats with English wives following the conquest include William Pece, Richard Juvenis and Odo, a Norman knight. Norman and English distinction appears to disappear towards the end of the 12th century and after the first barons' rebellion and the signing of the Magna Carta, English identity once again triumphed over England.

== Wales ==
The Normans also led excursions into Wales from England and built multiple fortifications as it was one of William's ambitions to subdue the Welsh as well as the English, however, he was not entirely successful. Afterward, however, the border area known as the Marches was set up and Norman influence increased steadily. Encouraged by the invasion, monks (usually from France or Normandy) such as the Cistercian Order also set up monasteries throughout Wales. By the 15th century a large number of Welsh gentry, including Owain Glyndŵr, had some Norman ancestry. The majority of knights who invaded Ireland were also from or based in Wales (see below).

== Ireland ==
Anglo-Norman barons also settled in Ireland from the 12th century, initially to support Irish regional kings such as Diarmuid Mac Murchadha whose name has arrived in modern English as Dermot MacMurrough. Richard de Clare, 2nd Earl of Pembroke, known as "Strongbow", was the leader of the Anglo-Norman Knights whom MacMurrough had requested of Henry II of England to help him to re-establish himself as King of Leinster. Strongbow died a very short time after invading Ireland but the men he brought with him remained to support Henry II of England and his son John as Lord of Ireland. Chief among the early Anglo-Norman settlers was Theobald Walter (surname Butler) appointed hereditary chief Butler of Ireland in 1177 by King Henry II and founder of one of the oldest remaining British dignities. Most of these Normans came from Wales, not England, and thus the epithet 'Cambro-Normans' is used to describe them by leading late medievalists such as Seán Duffy. They increasingly integrated with the local Celtic nobility through intermarriage and some accepted aspects of Celtic culture, especially outside the Pale around Dublin. They are known as Old English, but this term came into use to describe them only in 1580, i.e., over four centuries after the first Normans arrived in Ireland.

The Carol was a popular Norman dance in which the leader sang and was surrounded by a circle of dancers who replied with the same song. This Norman dance was performed in conquered Irish towns.

== Scotland ==
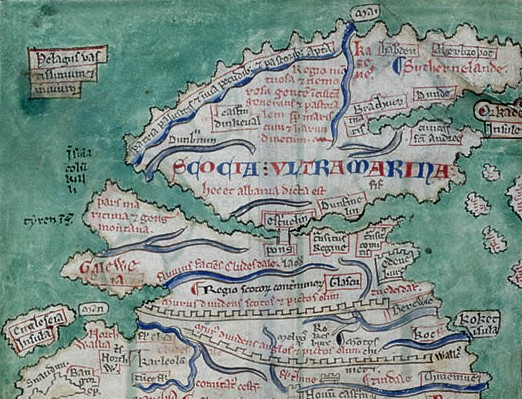
Scotland from the Matthew Paris map, c. 1250.

David I, who had spent most of his life as an English baron, became king of Scotland in 1124. His reign saw what has been characterised as a "Davidian Revolution", by which native institutions and personnel were replaced by English and French ones. Members of the Anglo-Norman nobility took up places in the Scottish aristocracy and he introduced a system of feudal land tenure, which produced knight service, castles and an available body of heavily armed cavalry. He created an Anglo-Norman style of court, introduced the office of justiciar to oversee justice, and local offices of sheriffs to administer localities. He established the first royal burghs in Scotland, granting rights to particular settlements, which led to the development of the first true Scottish towns and helped facilitate economic development as did the introduction of the first recorded Scottish coinage. He continued a process begun by his mother and brothers, of helping to establish foundations that brought the reformed monasticism based on that at Cluny. He also played a part in the organisation of diocese on lines closer to those in the rest of Western Europe. These reforms were pursued under his successors and grandchildren Malcolm IV of Scotland and William I, with the crown now passing down the main line of descent through primogeniture, leading to the first of a series of minorities.

== Anglo-Norman families ==
- House of Arcy
- House of Amondville/Amond
- House of Anvers
- House of Aubigny (or Albini)
- House of Bailleul (or Balliol)
- House of Baskerville
- House of Beaugency (or de La Flèche)
- House of Beauchamp
- House of Beaumont
- House of Bellême
- House of Bigod
- House of Bohun
- House of Bowes Lyon (or Bowley)
- House of Braose (or Brewes)
- House of Bruce
- House of Burgh
- House of Carteret
- House of Chandos
- House of Clare
- House of Colville (or Colvin)
- House of Corbet
- House of Courcy (or Courci)
- House of Crépon
- House of Curzon
- House of Dene
- House of Dévereux
- House of Melun/Carpenter
- House of Marisco/Morris
- House of Ferrières
- House of Fagan
- House of FitzGibbon
- House of FitzGerald
- House of FitzHugh
- House of FitzJoly
- House of FitzOsbern
- House of FitzWilliam/Hall
- House of FitzAlan
- House of FitzUrse
- House of Giffard
- House of Giroie
- House of Glanville
- House of Gorges
- House of Goz
- House of Grandmesnil
- House of Graham
- House of Grosvenor
- House of Harcourt
- House of Harris
- House of Hunter
- House of Hyde
- House of Ivry
- House of Lacy
- House of Limesy (or Limesi)
- House of Longe
- House of Longvillers
- House of Lucy (or Luci)
- House of Levett
- House of Longchamp
- House of de la Mare
- House of Malet
- House of Mandeville
- House of Marren
- House of Martin
- House of Mauger/Mayor
- House of Mayeux
- House of Melville
- House of Meschin
- House of Molyneux
- House of Mondaye
- House of Montfort
- House of De Montcitchet
- House of Montaigu
- House of Mortimer
- House of Montbray
- House of Montgomery
- House of Neville
- House of Normandy
- House of Osmondville/Osment
- House of Paganel
- House of Pennington
- House of Percy
- House of Peverel
- House of Piggot (or Piggott)
- House of Pople (Pepall or Populus, People)
- House of Reviers
- House of Roper
- House of Seymour
- House of Saint-Clair
- House of Spring
- House of Standish
- House of Strode
- House of Stuart
- House of Talbot
- House of Tosny
- House of Tritton
- House of Umfraville
- House of Verney
- House of Vincent
- House of Wake
- House of Warren
- House of Washington
- House of Whitworth

== See also ==
- Companions of William the Conqueror
