= Joseph Herbert Tritton =

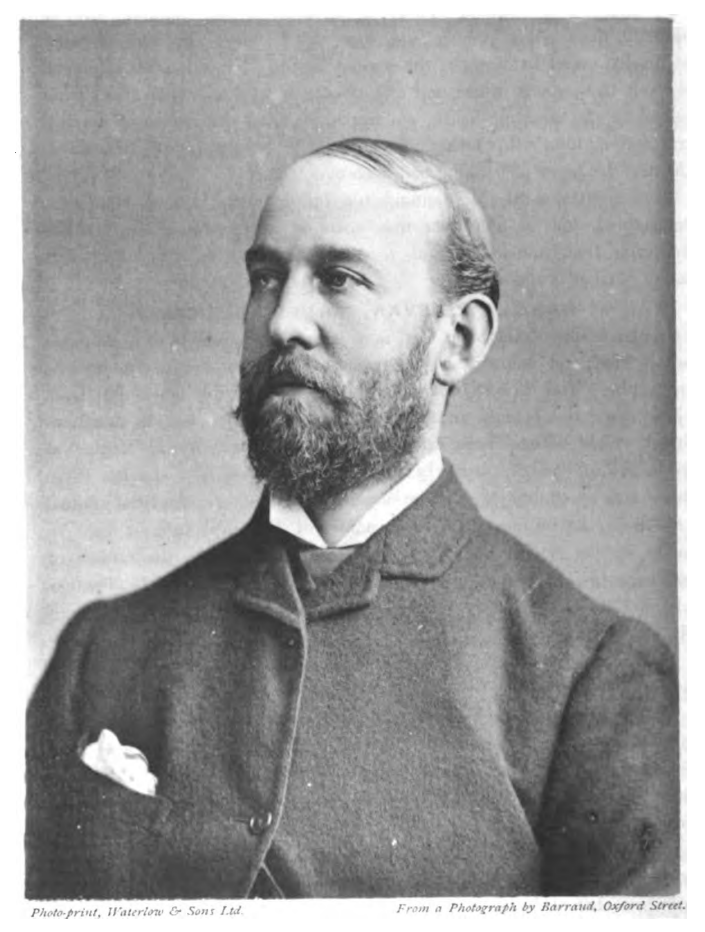
- Joseph Herbert Tritton
- Born: 5 September 1844; Battersea, Surrey (now London), England
- Died: 11 September 1923; Great Leighs, Essex, England
- Education: Rugby School
- Occupation: Banker
- Spouse: Lucy Jane Smith
- Children: 5 sons, 4 daughters
- Parent(s): Joseph Tritton; Amelia Hanson

Joseph Herbert Tritton (a.k.a. J. Herbert Tritton) (1844–1923) was an English banker.

== Early life ==
Joseph Herbert Tritton was born on 5 September 1844 at Olney Lodge, in Battersea, then in Surrey (now London). His father, Joseph Tritton (1819–1887), was a Quaker banker. His mother was Amelia Hanson, the daughter of Joseph Hanson of Brixton.

He was educated at Windlesham House School and Rugby School. He then went to work for the bank Barclay, Bevan, Tritton & Co., where his father was a partner. After some time he chose to make a trip abroad instead of going to university.

== Career ==
After working for five years, Tritton became a partner in Barclay, Bevan, Tritton & Co. When it became known as Barclays Bank, he served on its board of directors, retiring as a director in 1918.

Tritton was a co-founder of the Institute of Bankers and served as its President twice. The institute worked in educating bankers and standardizing their way of working. Tritton also served on the Council of Foreign Bondholders and was the honorary secretary of the London Clearing Bankers.

Tritton was involved in founding the London Chamber of Commerce in 1882. He also became its president.

Tritton served as the Chairman of the Indo-European Telegraph Company (now Siemens Communications).

Triton was also chairman of the General Steam Navigation Company (GSN). He was elected at age 30 in 1874, with little experience of the shipping business. He began his chairmanship with bold moves to double the company's capital, and to modernize its fleet. His chairmanship ended with his forced resignation after the company had come close to financial collapse in 1892. His successor Richard White was a successful entrepreneur. In Tritton's obituary, his chairmanship of GSN was not mentioned.

== Honours ==
Tritton was elected as a Fellow of the Royal Society of Arts in 1890. He was a recipient of the Order of the Lion and the Sun.

== Personal life ==
On 17 June 1867, he married Lucy Jane Smith, the daughter of Henry Abel Smith (1826–1890) of Wilford, Nottingham, a banker with interests in Lincoln and Nottingham. They had five sons, including the banker Herbert Leslie Melville Tritton, and four daughters.

== Family history ==
J. Herbert Tritton's family history Tritton: the Place and the Family (with an elaborate pedigree) was published in 1907.

== Death ==
Tritton died at his home, Lyons Hall, in Great Leighs, Essex on 11 September 1923.
