= Ernest Tritton =

British politician

Sir (Charles) Ernest Triton
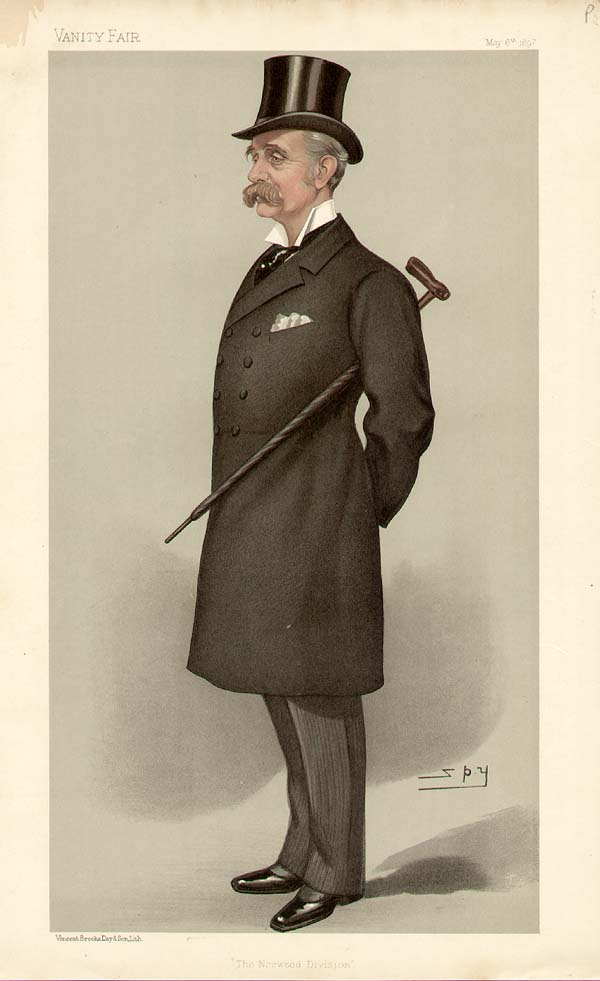
- The Norwood Division, Tritton as caricatured by Spy (Leslie Ward) in Vanity Fair, May 1897

Member of Parliament for Norwood
- In office 1892–1906
- Preceded by: Thomas Bristowe
- Succeeded by: George Bowles

Personal details
- Born: 4 September 1845
- Died: 28 December 1918 (aged 73)
- Resting place: West Norwood Cemetery
- Party: Conservative
- Spouse: Edith Green
- Children: 3
- Education: Trinity Hall, Cambridge

Sir Charles Ernest Tritton, 1st Baronet (4 September 1845 – 28 December 1918) was an English banker and politician.

== Early life ==
Charles Ernest Tritton was born on 4 September 1845. He was the son of Joseph Tritton, of Lombard Street. He was educated at the Rugby School. He graduated from Trinity Hall, Cambridge, where he received a BA in 1868.

== Career ==
Tritton was a member of the banking firm of Barclay, Bevan and Tritton in Lombard Street, a senior partner in the firm of Brightwen and Co., bill-brokers and banking agents, London, and a director of the UK Temperance and General Provident Institution, 1897.

From 1892 to 1906 he was Conservative MP for Norwood Division of Lambeth. In 1905 he was created Baronet of Bloomfield in the Metropolitan Borough of Lambeth and County of London.

== Philanthropy ==
He was involved in several philanthropic and religious institutions. He was vice-chairman of the Hospital Sunday Fund and Chairman of its Finance Committee, Vice-chairman of the London City Mission, Chairman of the Princess Christian's Hospital for British Wounded in South Norwood, and President of Norwood Cottage Hospital. He was also a Member of the Board of Management of the British Home for Incurables (latterly The British Home) and vice-president of both the British and Foreign Bible Society and the Church Missionary Society.

== Personal life ==
In 1872 he married Edith, the second daughter of Frederick Green. The couple had one son and two daughters.

== Death and legacy ==
He died on 28 December 1918, aged 73, and was buried at West Norwood Cemetery. He was succeeded as baronet by his son Alfred Ernest Tritton (8 June 1873 – 2 September 1939), who married Agneta Elspeth, daughter of W. M. Campbell, in 1898; they had one son and three daughters.

== See also ==
- Tritton baronets

Coat of arms of Ernest Tritton
Crest A Horse statant Argent resting the dexter forefoot upon a Bezant Escutcheon Argent on a Bend cotised Gules a Bezant between two Helmets Or Motto En Avant (Forward)

Parliament of the United Kingdom
Preceded by Thomas Bristowe	Member of Parliament for Norwood; 1892 – 1906	Succeeded by George Bowles
Baronetage of the United Kingdom
New creation	Baronet (of Bloomfield); 1905–1918	Succeeded by Alfred Tritton
