= Lyons Hall, Essex =

Grade II listed house in Great Leighs, Essex, UK

Coordinates: 51°48′44″N 0°31′09″E

Lyons Hall is a Grade II listed house in Great Leighs, Essex. The house dates to the 15th century. The house has been home to the Tritton banking family for many years, and Joseph Herbert Tritton died there in 1923.
