= Sir Geoffrey Ernest Tritton, 3rd Baronet =

British businessman, soldier and politician

Major Sir Geoffrey Ernest Tritton CBE DL (3 November 1900 – 15 November 1976), was a British businessman, soldier and Liberal Party politician, who later joined the Conservative party.

== Background ==
Tritton was born the son of Sir Alfred Tritton. He was educated at Eton and Trinity College, Cambridge. In 1925 he married Mary Patience Winifred Foster. They had one son and one daughter. He succeeded his father as Baronet in 1939. He was appointed a CBE in 1958.

== Professional career ==
Tritton was a partner in a firm of discount brokers and achieved the rank of Major as an officer in the Territorial Army Rifle Brigade. He was appointed as a Deputy Lieutenant for Wiltshire.

== Political career ==
Tritton was Liberal candidate for the Henley division of Oxfordshire at the 1929 General Election. Henley was a Unionist seat. The Liberals had come within 1,000 votes of winning Henley at the 1923 General Election. At the 1924 General election, the majority was more than 6,000. Tritton's prospects of winning were set back when the Labour Party, who had not run a candidate in either 1923 or 1924, decided to intervene. He retained second place but was unable to reduce the Unionist majority. After this experience he did not contest another general election for 21 years and by then he had changed his party. He was Conservative candidate for the Swindon division of Wiltshire at the 1950 General Election. Swindon was a Labour seat and he managed to retain second place out of four candidates. He contested Swindon again at the 1951 General Election, this time in a two-candidate contest with Labour, but still lost. He did not stand for parliament again, but during the 1950s served as a member of Wiltshire County Council.

=== Electoral record ===
General Election 1929: Henley
Party	Candidate	Votes	%	±%
Unionist	Robert Ronald Henderson	16,943	51.9	−12.9
Liberal	Geoffrey Ernest Tritton	9,786	29.9	+5.3
Labour	Bernard Benjamin Gillis	5,962	18.2	n/a
Majority		7,157	22.0	−18.2
Turnout		32,631	73.3	+3.1
Unionist hold		Swing	-9.1	

General Election 1950: Swindon
Party	Candidate	Votes	%	±%
Labour	Thomas Reid	21,976	51.47	
Conservative	Sir Geoffrey Ernest Tritton	13,697	32.08	
Liberal	Doreen Marjorie Gorsky	6,726	15.75	
Communist	Irving Gradwell	295	0.69	
Majority		8,279	19.39	
Turnout			87.19	
Labour hold		Swing		

General Election 1951: Swindon
Party	Candidate	Votes	%	±%
Labour	Thomas Reid	23,980	57.02	
Conservative	Sir Geoffrey Ernest Tritton	18,072	42.98	
Majority		5,908	14.05	
Turnout			89.00	
Labour hold		Swing		

== See also ==
- Tritton baronets

Baronetage of the United Kingdom
Preceded by Alfred Tritton	Baronet (of Bloomfield); 1939–1976	Succeeded by Anthony Tritton
