= Lyon Hall =

Lyon Hall may refer to:

- Lyon Hall (Demopolis, Alabama), a historic house in Demopolis, Alabama.
- Lyon Hall on the Cornell West Campus in Ithaca, New York.
