= Norwood (UK Parliament constituency) =

Parliamentary constituency in the United Kingdom, 1885–1997

- Former borough constituency for the House of Commons
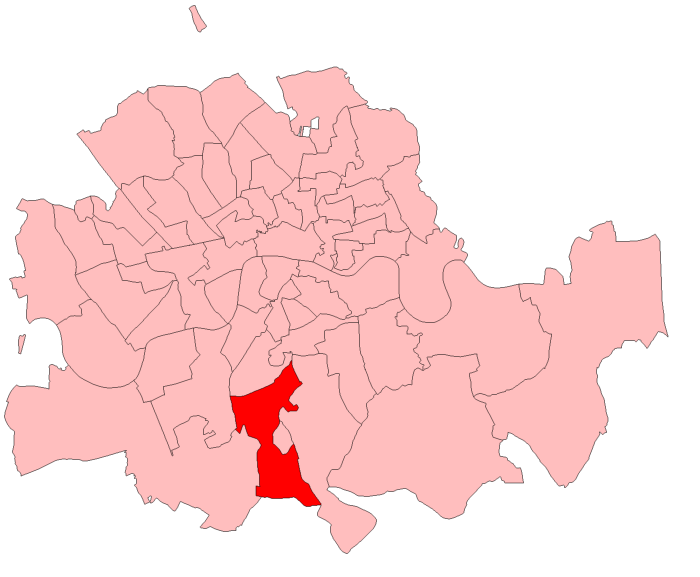
- Norwood in London, 1885–1918

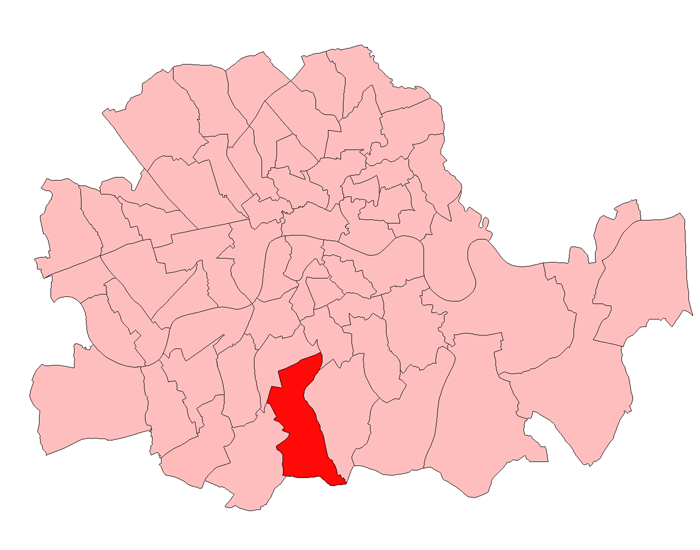
- Norwood in London, 1918–74
- County: Greater London

1885–1997
- Seats: One
- Created from: Lambeth
- Replaced by: Dulwich & West Norwood, Streatham and Vauxhall

Norwood was a parliamentary constituency in south London which returned one Member of Parliament (MP) to the House of Commons of the Parliament of the United Kingdom by the first past the post system.

== History ==
The constituency existed from 1885 until it was abolished for the 1997 general election. It was held by the Conservative Party for the first 60 years of its existence. It then oscillated between the Conservatives and Labour until 1966, from which point it was held by Labour until its abolition.

In 1966, 10.8% were born in the New Commonwealth.

== Boundaries ==
1885–1918: Parliamentary borough of Lambeth division no 4: the ward of Norwood and those parts of the wards of Brixton and Stockwell lying south of Coldharbour and Acre Lanes.

1918–1950: The Metropolitan Borough of Lambeth ward of Norwood, and parts of the wards of Herne Hill and Tulse Hill.

1950–1974: The Metropolitan Borough of Lambeth wards of Herne Hill, Knight's Hill, and Tulse Hill.

1974–1983: The London Borough of Lambeth wards of Herne Hill, Knight's Hill, Leigham, Thurlow Park, and Tulse Hill.

1983–1997: The London Borough of Lambeth wards of Angell, Gipsy Hill, Herne Hill, Knight's Hill, St Martin's, Thurlow Park, and Tulse Hill.

=== Abolition ===
In 1997 areas were split between the newly created seats Dulwich and West Norwood towards the east, Streatham to the west and Vauxhall to the north. The first of these is cross-borough, spanning elements of firmly Labour-leaning Lambeth and Southwark London Boroughs.

== Members of Parliament ==
Year	Member	Party
1885	Thomas Bristowe	Conservative
1892	Sir Ernest Tritton	Conservative
1906	George Bowles	Conservative
1910	Harry Samuel	Unionist
1922	Walter Greaves-Lord	Unionist
1935 by-election	Duncan Sandys	Conservative
1945	Ronald Chamberlain	Labour
1950	John Smyth	Conservative
1966	John Fraser	Labour
1997	constituency abolished	

== Election results ==
=== Elections in the 1880s ===
General election 1885: Norwood
Party	Candidate	Votes	%	±%
Conservative	Thomas Bristowe	3,496	57.7	
Liberal	Peter Clayden	2,563	42.3	
Majority		933	15.4	
Turnout		6,059	80.8	
Registered electors		7,501		
Conservative win (new seat)				

General election 1886: Norwood
Party	Candidate	Votes	%	±%
Conservative	Thomas Bristowe	3,334	67.5	+9.8
Liberal	Oscar Browning	1,606	32.5	−9.8
Majority		1,728	35.0	+19.6
Turnout		4,940	65.9	−14.9
Registered electors		7,501		
Conservative hold		Swing	+9.8	

=== Elections in the 1890s ===
General election 1892: Norwood
Party	Candidate	Votes	%	±%
Conservative	Ernest Tritton	4,147	61.6	−5.9
Liberal	Harry Walter Verdon	2,584	38.4	+5.9
Majority		1,563	23.2	−11.8
Turnout		6,731	75.8	+9.9
Registered electors		8,884		
Conservative hold		Swing	−5.9	

General election 1895: Norwood
Party	Candidate	Votes	%	±%
Conservative	Charles Tritton	Unopposed		
Conservative hold				

=== Elections in the 1900s ===
General election 1900: Norwood
Party	Candidate	Votes	%	±%
Conservative	Charles Tritton	Unopposed		
Conservative hold				

Hubbard

General election 1906: Norwood
Party	Candidate	Votes	%	±%
Conservative	George Bowles	5,567	54.0	N/A
Liberal	Nathaniel William Hubbard	4,748	46.0	New
Majority		819	8.0	N/A
Turnout		10,315	80.2	N/A
Registered electors		12,867		
Conservative hold		Swing	N/A	

=== Elections in the 1910s ===
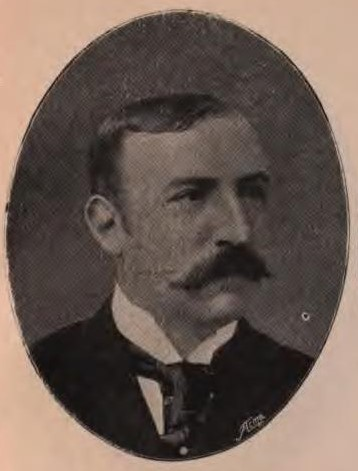
Samuel

General election January 1910: Norwood
Party	Candidate	Votes	%	±%
Conservative	Harry Samuel	6,958	57.3	+3.3
Liberal	Alexander Waldemar Lawrence	5,180	42.7	−3.3
Majority		1,778	14.6	+6.6
Turnout		12,138		
Conservative hold		Swing	+3.3	

Shrubsall

General election December 1910: Norwood
Party	Candidate	Votes	%	±%
Conservative	Harry Samuel	6,291	59.6	+2.3
Liberal	George Shrubsall	4,265	40.4	−2.3
Majority		2,026	19.2	+4.6
Turnout		10,556		
Conservative hold		Swing	+2.3	

General Election 1914–15:

Another General Election was required to take place before the end of 1915. The political parties had been making preparations for an election to take place and by July 1914, the following candidates had been selected;

- Unionist: Harry Samuel
- Liberal: William Llewellyn Williams

General election 1918: Norwood
Party		Candidate	Votes	%	±%
C	Unionist	Harry Samuel	12,848	65.8	+6.2
	NFDDSS	Harold Bignold	6,665	34.2	New
Majority			6,183	31.6	+12.4
Turnout			19,513	48.5	
	Unionist hold		Swing		
C indicates candidate endorsed by the coalition government.

=== Elections in the 1920s ===
General election 1922: Norwood
Party	Candidate	Votes	%	±%
Unionist	Walter Greaves-Lord	16,121	60.8	−5.0
Liberal	Richard Evan Williams Kirby	6,253	23.5	New
Labour	William Archer Hodgson	4,180	15.7	New
Majority		9,868	37.3	+5.7
Turnout		26,554	61.7	+13.2
Unionist hold		Swing		

General election 1923: Norwood
Party	Candidate	Votes	%	±%
Unionist	Walter Greaves-Lord	12,725	49.3	−11.5
Liberal	Frank Dawson Lapthorn	8,127	31.4	+7.9
Labour	William Archer Hodgson	5,002	19.3	+3.6
Majority		4,598	17.9	−19.4
Turnout		25,854	59.4	−2.3
Unionist hold		Swing	-9.7	

General election 1924: Norwood
Party	Candidate	Votes	%	±%
Unionist	Walter Greaves-Lord	22,178	71.3	+22.0
Labour	George James Anstey	8,927	28.7	+9.4
Majority		13,251	42.6	+24.7
Turnout		31,105	70.2	+10.8
Unionist hold		Swing	+6.3	

General election 1929: Norwood
Party	Candidate	Votes	%	±%
Unionist	Walter Greaves-Lord	19,281	50.6	−20.7
Labour	William Obrien Reeves	11,042	28.9	+0.2
Liberal	Edward Stacey Layton	7,823	20.5	New
Majority		8,239	21.7	−20.9
Turnout		38,146	65.6	−4.6
Unionist hold		Swing	-10.4	

=== Elections in the 1930s ===
General election 1931: Norwood
Party	Candidate	Votes	%	±%
Conservative	Walter Greaves-Lord	30,851	81.0	+30.4
Labour	Ann Jane Anstey	7,217	19.0	−9.9
Majority		23,634	62.0	+40.3
Turnout		38,068	63.9	−1.7
Conservative hold		Swing	+20.2	

1935 Norwood by-election
Party	Candidate	Votes	%	±%
Conservative	Duncan Sandys	16,147	51.1	−29.9
Labour	Barbara Ayrton-Gould	12,799	40.4	+21.4
Ind. Conservative	Richard Findlay	2,698	8.5	New
Majority		3,348	10.7	−51.3
Turnout		31,644	53.4	−10.5
Conservative hold		Swing	-25.7	

General election 1935: Norwood
Party	Candidate	Votes	%	±%
Conservative	Duncan Sandys	24,651	66.9	−14.1
Labour	Charles Gibson	12,195	33.1	+14.1
Majority		12,456	33.8	−28.2
Turnout		36,846	62.2	−1.7
Conservative hold		Swing	+11.6	

=== Elections in the 1940s ===
General election 1939–40

Another general election was required to take place before the end of 1940. The political parties had been making preparations for an election to take place and by the Autumn of 1939, the following candidates had been selected;

- Conservative: Duncan Sandys
- Labour:
- Liberal:

General election 1945: Norwood
Party	Candidate	Votes	%	±%
Labour	Ronald Chamberlain	16,667	47.3	+14.2
Conservative	Duncan Sandys	14,644	41.5	−25.4
Liberal	Alfred Wintle	3,944	11.2	New
Majority		2,023	5.8	N/A
Turnout		35,255	71.3	+9.1
Labour gain from Conservative		Swing	+19.8	

=== Elections in the 1950s ===
General election 1950: Norwood
Party	Candidate	Votes	%	±%
Conservative	John Smyth	24,811	48.4	+6.9
Labour	Ronald Chamberlain	22,736	44.3	−3.0
Liberal	Robin Bruce Fredericke	3,770	7.3	−3.9
Majority		2,075	4.1	N/A
Turnout		51,317	84.2	+12.9
Conservative gain from Labour		Swing	+5.0	

General election 1951: Norwood
Party	Candidate	Votes	%	±%
Conservative	John Smyth	27,200	52.9	+4.5
Labour	Ronald Chamberlain	24,251	47.1	+2.8
Majority		2,949	5.8	+1.7
Turnout		51,451	82.7	−1.5
Conservative hold		Swing	+0.9	

General election 1955: Norwood
Party	Candidate	Votes	%	±%
Conservative	John Smyth	24,831	55.6	+2.7
Labour	James Avery Joyce	19,799	44.4	−2.7
Majority		5,032	11.2	+5.4
Turnout		44,630	75.2	−7.5
Conservative hold		Swing	+2.7	

General election 1959: Norwood
Party	Candidate	Votes	%	±%
Conservative	John Smyth	22,958	52.6	−3.0
Labour	Leslie Leonard Reeves	15,975	36.6	−7.8
Liberal	Dennis Raymond Chapman	4,744	10.8	New
Majority		6,983	16.0	+4.8
Turnout		43,677	75.6	+0.4
Conservative hold		Swing	+2.4	

=== Elections in the 1960s ===
General election 1964: Norwood
Party	Candidate	Votes	%	±%
Conservative	John Smyth	17,624	45.5	−7.1
Labour	John Fraser	17,173	44.3	+8.7
Liberal	Dennis Raymond Chapman	3,929	10.2	−0.6
Majority		451	1.2	−14.8
Turnout		38,726	67.8	−7.8
Conservative hold		Swing	-7.4	

General election 1966: Norwood
Party	Candidate	Votes	%	±%
Labour	John Fraser	19,103	48.8	+4.5
Conservative	W. Douglas Wilson	16,830	42.9	−2.6
Liberal	Michael A. Green	3,256	8.3	−1.9
Majority		2,273	5.9	N/A
Turnout		39,189	71.8	+4.0
Labour gain from Conservative		Swing	+3.6	

=== Elections in the 1970s ===
General election 1970: Norwood
Party	Candidate	Votes	%	±%
Labour	John Fraser	16,634	47.4	−1.4
Conservative	Peter Temple-Morris	16,003	45.6	+2.7
Liberal	Eric Hawthorne	2,436	7.0	−1.3
Majority		631	1.8	−4.1
Turnout		35,073	64.4	−7.4
Labour hold		Swing	-2.1	

General election February 1974: Lambeth, Norwood
Party	Candidate	Votes	%	±%
Labour	John Fraser	17,320	46.2	−1.2
Conservative	B. Hancock	13,298	35.4	−10.2
Liberal	M. Drake	6,885	18.4	+11.4
Majority		4,022	10.8	+9.0
Turnout		37,503	71.3	+6.9
Labour hold		Swing	+4.5	

General election October 1974: Lambeth, Norwood
Party	Candidate	Votes	%	±%
Labour	John Fraser	16,449	50.2	+4.0
Conservative	B. Hancock	11,678	35.7	+0.3
Liberal	Eric Hawthorne	4,377	13.4	−5.0
Gay Liberal	M.J. Greatbanks	223	0.7	New
Majority		4,771	14.5	+3.7
Turnout		32,727	61.9	−9.4
Labour hold		Swing	+1.9	

General election 1979: Lambeth, Norwood
Party	Candidate	Votes	%	±%
Labour	John Fraser	16,282	47.3	−2.9
Conservative	John Pritchard	14,342	41.7	+6.0
Liberal	David Charlesworth	3,051	8.9	−4.5
National Front	Catherine Williams	707	2.1	New
Majority		1,940	5.6	−8.9
Turnout		34,382	70.4	+8.5
Labour hold		Swing	-4.5	

=== Elections in the 1980s ===
General election 1983: Norwood
Party	Candidate	Votes	%	±%
Labour	John Fraser	16,280	44.6	−2.7
Conservative	John Parfitt	13,397	36.7	−5.0
SDP	Malcolm Noble	6,371	17.5	+8.6
National Front	C.M. Williams	343	0.9	−1.2
Independent	J.C. Sanderson	123	0.3	New
Majority		2,883	7.9	+2.3
Turnout		36,514	65.6	−4.8
Labour hold		Swing	+1.2	

General election 1987: Norwood
Party	Candidate	Votes	%	±%
Labour	John Fraser	18,359	48.4	+3.8
Conservative	Dominic Grieve	13,636	36.0	−0.7
SDP	Malcolm Noble	5,579	14.7	−2.8
Rainbow	Francis Jackson	171	0.5	New
Independent Christian Democrat	Roger Hammond	151	0.4	New
Majority		4,723	12.4	+4.5
Turnout		37,896	67.0	+1.4
Labour hold		Swing	+2.3	

=== Elections in the 1990s ===
General election 1992: Norwood
Party	Candidate	Votes	%	±%
Labour	John Fraser	18,391	53.2	+4.8
Conservative	J. P. E. Samways	11,175	32.3	−3.7
Liberal Democrats	Sandra Lawman	4,087	11.8	−2.9
Green	W. S. B. Collins	790	2.3	New
Natural Law	M. C. Leighton	138	0.4	New
Majority		7,216	20.9	+8.5
Turnout		34,581	66.1	−0.9
Labour hold		Swing	+4.2	
