= Lydia Ellen Tritton =

Australian journalist (1899–1946)

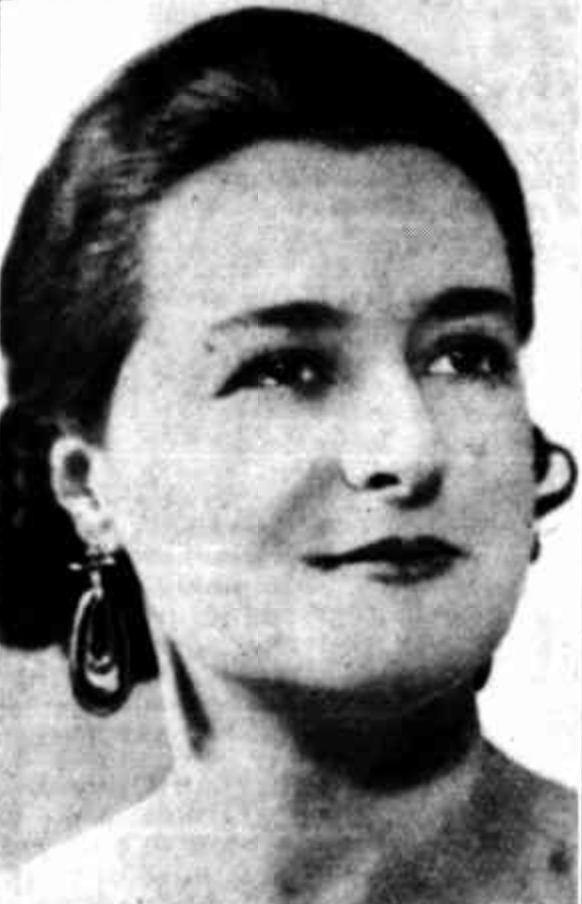
Tritton, c. 1929

Lydia "Nellé" Tritton (Russian: Лидия Тереза ("Нелль") Керенская (Триттон), 19 September 1899 – 10 April 1946) was an Australian journalist, poet, and self-declared "public elocutionist".

== Early life and education ==
Tritton was born in Brisbane on 19 September 1899. Her parents, Fred Tritton, was a prominent Brisbane furniture warehouseman. In her mid-20s, she sailed to London and toured Europe, gaining a reputation for knowledge of international affairs, which brought her into contact with the Russian expatriates then living in Paris.

== Personal life ==
In 1928, Tritton married a former officer of Russia's White Army, Nicholas Alexander Nadejine, then 43-years-old, at the marriage registry office in Kensington, England. Nadejine was a professional singer, but was unsuccessful in joining the Covent Garden Opera Company and reportedly had affairs with various wealthy Englishwomen. The couple divorced after eight years of marriage in 1936.

Three years later, in 1939, Tritton married exiled Russian prime minister Alexander Kerensky in Martins Creek, Pennsylvania, and they lived in exile in Pennsylvania and then in Paris and New York City.

== Death and legacy ==
In February 1946, while visiting her parents in Brisbane, Tritton had a stroke and died of chronic nephritis on 10 April.

In 2016, the story of Tritton's life was adapted into a play, Motherland, by playwright Katherine Lyall-Watson.
