= Streatham =

District of south London, England

Coordinates: 51.4279°N 0.1235°W

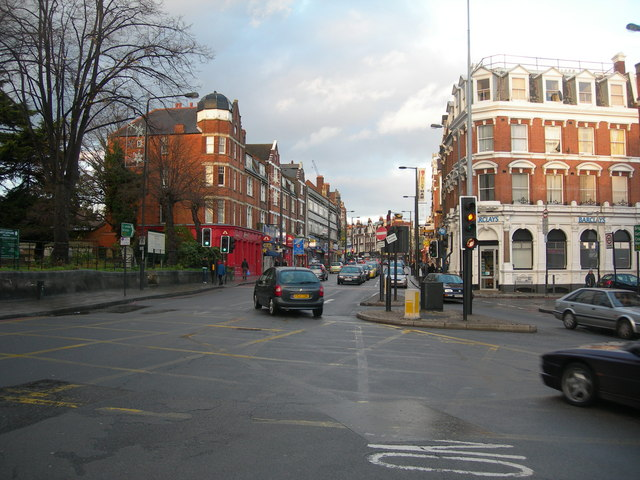
- Streatham High Road, looking north from the junction with Mitcham Lane

- Location within Greater London
- Population: 58,055 (2011)
- OS grid reference: TQ305715
- London borough: Lambeth; Wandsworth
- Ceremonial county: Greater London
- Region: London
- Country: England
- Sovereign state: United Kingdom
- Post town: LONDON
- Postcode district: SW2, SW16
- Dialling code: 020
- Police: Metropolitan
- Fire: London
- Ambulance: London
- UK Parliament: Streatham and Croydon North
- London Assembly: Lambeth and Southwark; Merton and Wandsworth

Streatham (/ˈstrɛt.əm/ STRET-əm) is a district in south London in England that lies five miles (eight kilometres) south of Charing Cross. It falls mostly within the London Borough of Lambeth, with some parts extending westward into the neighbouring London Borough of Wandsworth.

Streatham formed part of Surrey before becoming part of the County of London in 1889, and then of Greater London in 1965.

The London Plan identifies the area as one of 35 major centres in Greater London.

== History ==
A map showing the Streatham ward of Wandsworth Metropolitan Borough as it appeared in 1916

Streatham means "the hamlet on the street". The street in question, the London to Brighton Way, was the Roman road from the capital Londinium to the south coast near Portslade, today within Brighton and Hove. It is likely that the destination was a Roman port now lost to coastal erosion, which has been tentatively identified with 'Novus Portus' mentioned in Ptolemy's Geographia. The road is confusingly referred to as Stane Street (Stone Street) in some sources and diverges from the main London-Chichester road at Kennington.

Streatham's first parish church, St Leonard's, was founded in Saxon times but an early Tudor tower is the only remaining structure pre-dating 1831 when the body of the church was rebuilt. The medieval parish covered a wider area including Balham and Tooting Bec. The southern portion of what is now Streatham formed part of Tooting Graveney ancient parish.

A charter states that in the late seventh century, land in Streatham and Tooting Graveney was granted by Erkenwald and Frithwald to Chertsey Abbey, a grant which was later confirmed in the time of Athelstan in 933.

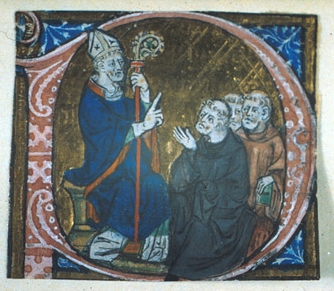
St Erkenwald is recorded as granting land in the area to Chertsey Abbey.

Streatham appears in the Domesday Book of 1086 as Estreham. It was held by Bec-Hellouin Abbey (in Normandy) from Richard de Tonbrige. Its Domesday assets were: 2 hides, 1 virgate and 6 1/2 ploughlands of cultivated land and 4 acres (1.6 ha) of meadow and herbage (mixed grass and bracken). Annually it was assessed to render £4 5s 0d to its overlords.

After the departure of the Romans, the main road through Streatham remained an important trackway. From the 17th century it was adopted as the main coach road to Croydon and East Grinstead, and then on to Newhaven and Lewes. In 1780 it then became the route of the turnpike road from London to Brighton, and subsequently became the basis for the modern A23. This road (and its traffic) have shaped Streatham's development.

=== Streatham Village and Streatham Wells ===
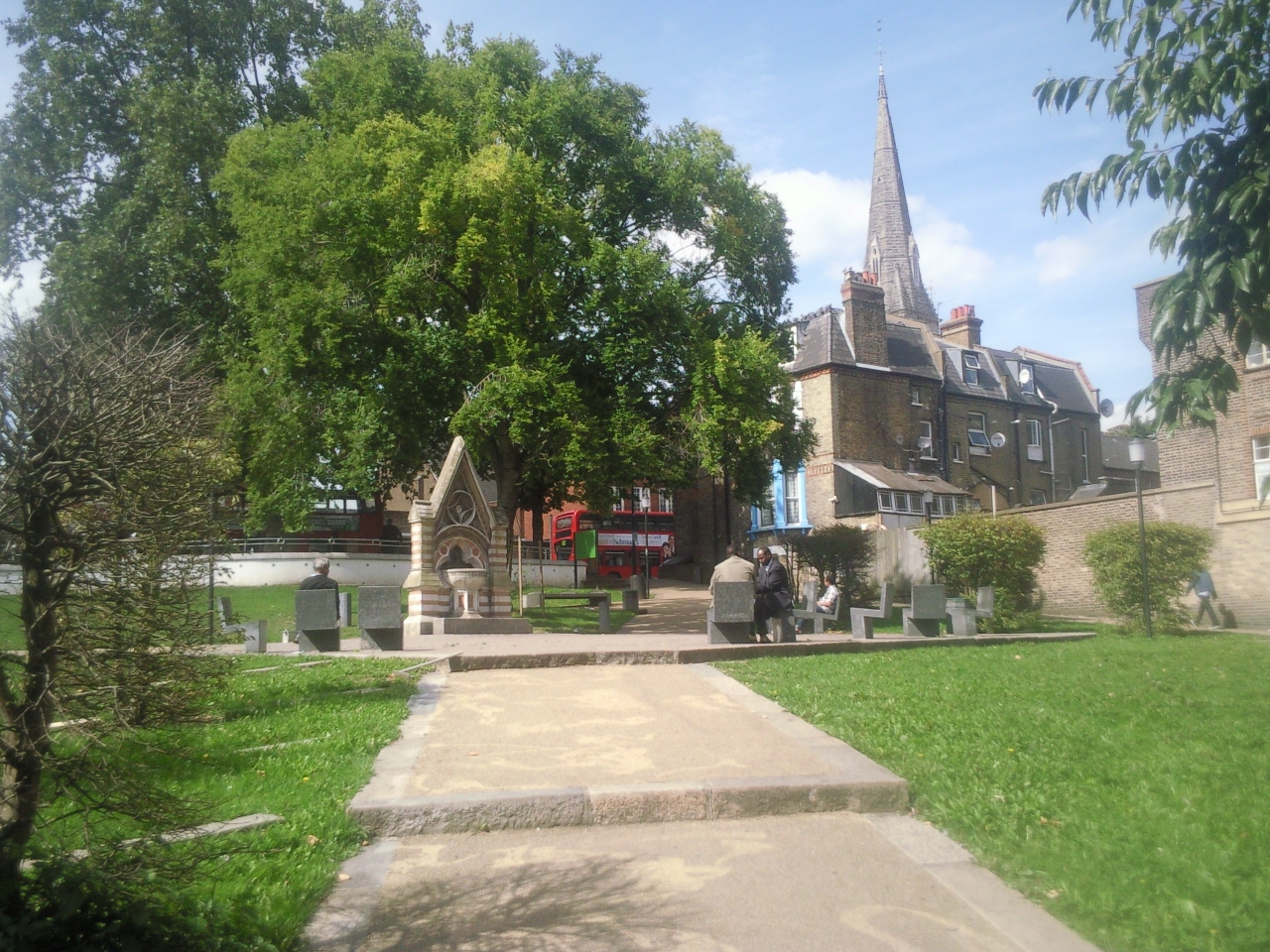
Streatham Green with the spire of the Catholic English Martyrs’ Church beyond

The village remained largely unchanged until the 18th century, when its natural springs, known as Streatham Wells, were first celebrated for their health-giving properties. The reputation of the spa, and improved turnpike roads, attracted wealthy City of London merchants and others to build their country residences in Streatham.

In spite of London's expansion, a limited number of developments took place in the village in the second half of the nineteenth century, Streatham Vale sprung up to the South later still and the small parade of shops by Streatham Common Station has become known colloquially as Streatham Village.

Wellfield Road, which had previously been known as Leigham Lane, was renamed to reflect its role as the main route from the centre of Streatham to one of the well locations. Another mineral well was located on the south side of Streatham Common, in an area that now forms part of The Rookery, where it can still be seen and visited within the formal gardens.

=== Streatham Park or Streatham Place ===
In the 1730s, Streatham Park, a Georgian country mansion, was built by the brewer Ralph Thrale on land he bought from the Lord of the manor – the fourth Duke of Bedford. Streatham Park later passed to Ralph's son Henry Thrale, who with his wife Hester Thrale entertained many of the leading literary and artistic characters of the day, most notably the lexicographer Samuel Johnson. The dining room contained 12 portraits of Henry's guests painted by his friend Joshua Reynolds. These pictures were wittily labelled by Fanny Burney as the Streatham Worthies.

Streatham Park was later leased to Prime Minister Lord Shelburne, and was the venue for early negotiations with France that led to the Peace Treaty of 1783. Streatham Park was demolished in 1863.

=== Park Hill ===
One large house that survives is Park Hill, on the north side of Streatham Common, rebuilt in the early 19th century for the silk merchant, William Leaf. His architect was John Buonarotti Papworth. It was later the home of Sir Henry Tate, sugar refiner, benefactor of local libraries across south London, including Streatham Library, and founder of the Tate Gallery at Millbank. Tate engaged Robert Marnock to re-model the grounds, which were listed at Grade II on the Register of Historic Parks and Gardens of Special Historic Interest in England in 1987. The house later became a convent, St Michael's.

=== Urbanisation ===
Development accelerated after the opening of Streatham Hill railway station on the West End of London and Crystal Palace Railway in 1856. The other two railway stations followed within fifteen years. Some estates, such as Telford Park to the west of Streatham Hill, were spaciously planned with facilities like tennis clubs. Despite the local connections to the Dukes of Bedford, there is no link to the contemporary Bedford Park in west London. Another generously sized development was Roupell Park, the area near Christchurch Road promoted by the Roupell family. Other streets adopted more conventional suburban layouts. Three more parish churches were built to serve the growing area, including Immanuel and St Andrew's (1854), St Peter's (1870) and St Margaret the Queen's (1889).

==== Frederick Wheeler's Terraces ====
At the end of the 19th Century the heart of the old heart of the village of Streatham was sweepingly remodelled to the architectural designs of the young local architect Frederick Wheeler FRIBA, creating the streetscape which remains to this day.

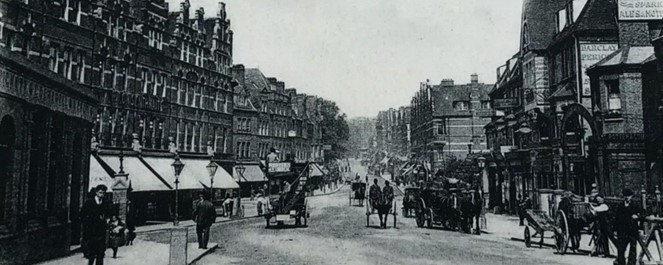
Frederick Wheeler's terraces, Streatham High Road, 1910

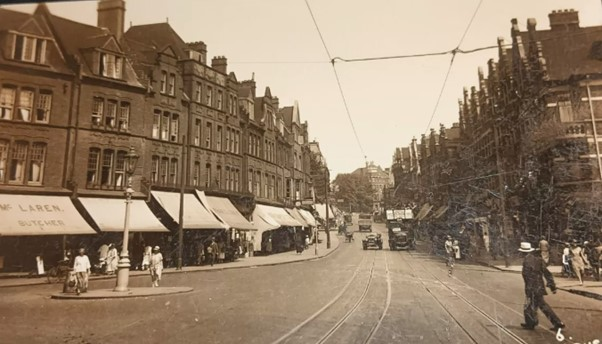
'The Dip' flanked by Wheeler's terraces, 1930s.

Between 1884 and 1891 a comprehensive scheme of four-storey, Queen Anne Revival style shop houses was designed by Wheeler and built by the local firm Hill Brothers. Running down from the High Road as it diverges south from Mitcham Lane and past Streatham Green the parade continues, almost unbroken, to the entrance of Streatham Station. The scheme meets, visually, at the bottom of the steep hill and cross-roads known locally as 'The Dip' in a pair of matched developments named The Broadway and The Triangle on what is now Gleneagle Road. South of this junction the development continues with Wheeler's Queens Parade terrace of 1885 rising up towards the railway bridge and Streatham Station.

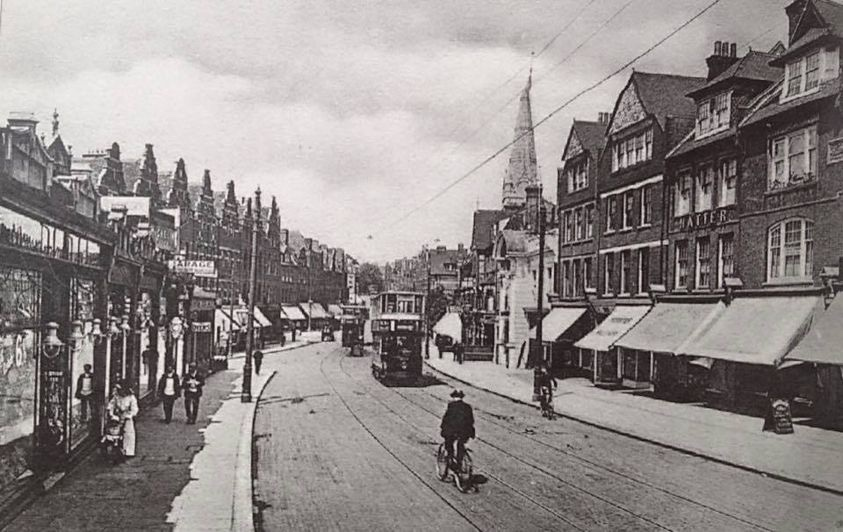
The Queens Parade by Frederick Wheeler, 1920.

This long run of matching red-brick parades, topped with high red-brick 'Dutch gables' and decorative chimney stacks all enlivened by decorative plasterwork, banded brickwork and multiform timber sash and tripartite dormer windows, was noted by Pevsner. Wheeler's comprehensive development also included Streatham Hall, which served for some time as the local town hall in the early 1900s, standing at 344 Streatham High Road between 1888 and its demolition in 1980. A surviving parade of shops fronting Streatham Green on Mitcham Lane has also been ascribed to Wheeler, who contributed a large number of other buildings to the local area including the (listed) Methodist church on Riggindale Road, Sussex House on the corner of Tooting Bec Gardens and the large houses built on the Manor Park (Wheeler lived at No. 7 Rydal Road) and Woodlands estates as well and the discreet electricity substation in a "15th century Gothic style" beside the English Martyrs Church on Mitcham Lane.

Wheeler later went on to find fame with his Arts & Crafts influenced St Pauls Studios residences for bachelor artists, on Talgarth Road, Hammersmith.

There is now a mixture of buildings from all architectural eras of the past 200 years in the Streatham conservation area.

=== The inter-war period ===
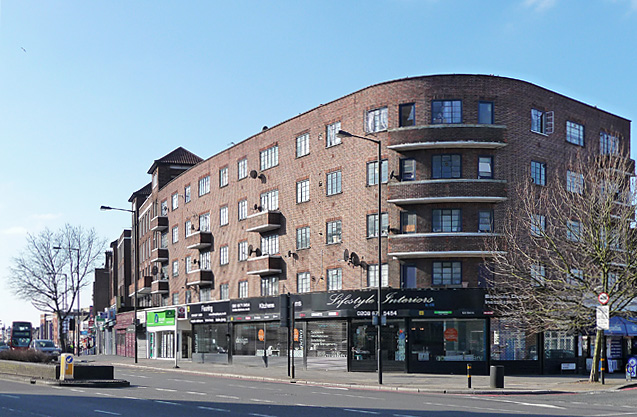
Telford Parade Mansions, Streatham Hill

After the First World War Streatham developed as a location for entertainment, with the Streatham Hill Theatre, three cinemas, the Locarno ballroom and Streatham Ice Rink all adding to its reputation as "the West End of South London". With the advent of electric tram services, it also grew as a shopping centre serving a wide area to the south. In the 1930s large numbers of blocks of flats were constructed along the High Road. These speculative developments were not initially successful. They were only filled when émigré communities began to arrive in London after leaving countries under the domination of Hitler's Germany. In 1932 the parish church of the Holy Redeemer was built in Streatham Vale to commemorate the work of William Wilberforce.

=== Retail decline and recovery ===
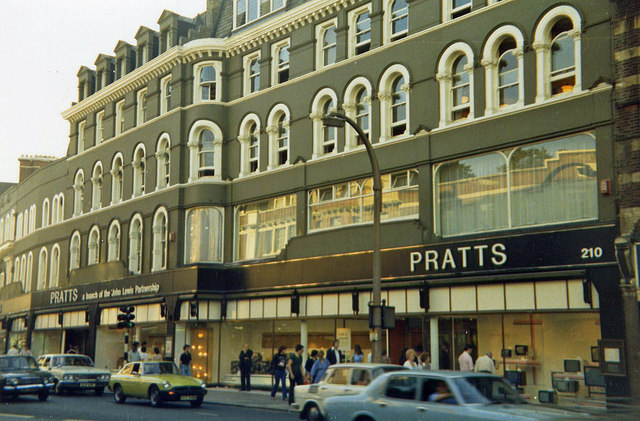
Pratt's department store in summer 1978. The store closed down in 1990 and the building was demolished in 1996.

In the 1950s Streatham had the longest and busiest shopping street in south London. Streatham became the site of the UK's first supermarket, when Express Dairies Premier Supermarkets opened its first 2,500-square-foot (230 m^{2}) store in 1951; Waitrose subsequently opened its first supermarket in Streatham in 1955, but it closed down in 1963.

However, a combination of factors led to a gradual decline through the 1970s and a more rapid decline in the 1980s. These included long term population movements out to Croydon, Kingston and Sutton; the growth of heavy traffic on the A23 (main road from central London to Gatwick Airport and Brighton); and a lack of redevelopment sites in the town centre. This culminated in 1990 when the closure of Pratts, which had grown from a Victorian draper's shop to a department store operated since the 1940s by the John Lewis Partnership, coincided with the opening of a large Sainsbury's supermarket half a mile south of the town centre, replacing an existing, smaller Sainbury's store opposite Streatham Hill railway station.

Several recent additions, such as Argos, Lidl and Peacocks, are located in new retail spaces on the site of Pratt's but, in common with other high streets, retail recovery has been slow, and a substantial proportion of vacant space has been taken by a growing number of restaurants, bars and coffee shops.

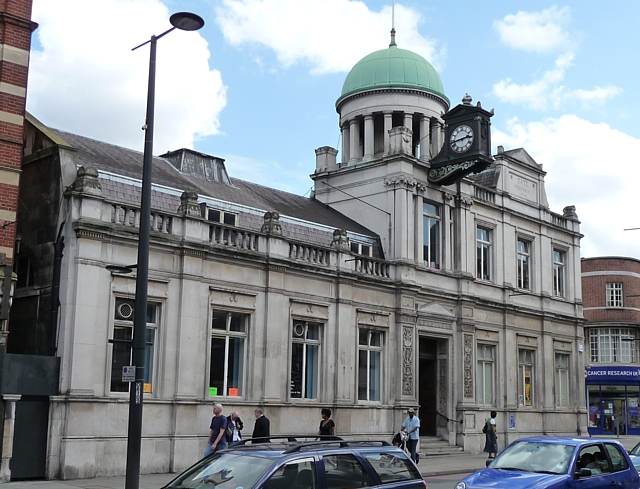
Tate Free Library, Streatham

In August 2011, Streatham was selected as one of the areas to benefit from Round 1 of the Mayor of London's Outer London Fund, gaining £300,000. Later, Streatham was awarded a further £1.6 million, matched by another £1 million by Lambeth. The money from this fund was spent on improving streets and public spaces in Streatham. This includes the smartening up of shop fronts through painting and cleaning, replacing shutters and signage as well as helping to reveal facilities behind the high street such as The Stables Community Centre. Streatham Library has also undergone a £1.2 million refurbishment. The Tudor Hall behind the library was brought back into public use as The Mark Bennett Centre providing a meeting and performance space. Streatham Skyline introduced new lighting to highlight some of Streatham's more attractive buildings and monuments with the aim of improving safety and the overall attractiveness of the area.

=== Contemporary Streatham ===
In September 2002, Streatham High Road was voted the "Worst Street in Britain" in a poll organised by the BBC Today programme and CABE. This largely reflected the dominance of through traffic along High Road.

Plans for investment and regeneration had begun before the poll, with local amenity group the Streatham Society leading a successful partnership bid for funding from central government for environmental improvements. Work started in winter 2003–04 with the refurbishment of Streatham Green and repaving and relighting of the High Road between St Leonard's Church and the Odeon Cinema. In 2005 Streatham Green won the Metropolitan Public Gardens Association 'London Spade' award for best public open space scheme in the capital.

The poll was a catalyst for Lambeth London Borough Council and Transport for London's Street Management to co-operate on a joint funding arrangement for further streetscape improvements, which benefited the section of the High Road between St Leonard's and Streatham station, and the stretch north of the Odeon as far as Woodbourne Avenue. The section between Woodbourne Avenue and Streatham Hill station was not completed until 2015.

Streatham Festival was established in 2002. It has grown to a festival with over 50 events held in an array of locations, from bars to churches and parks to youth centres, attracting over 3,000 people.

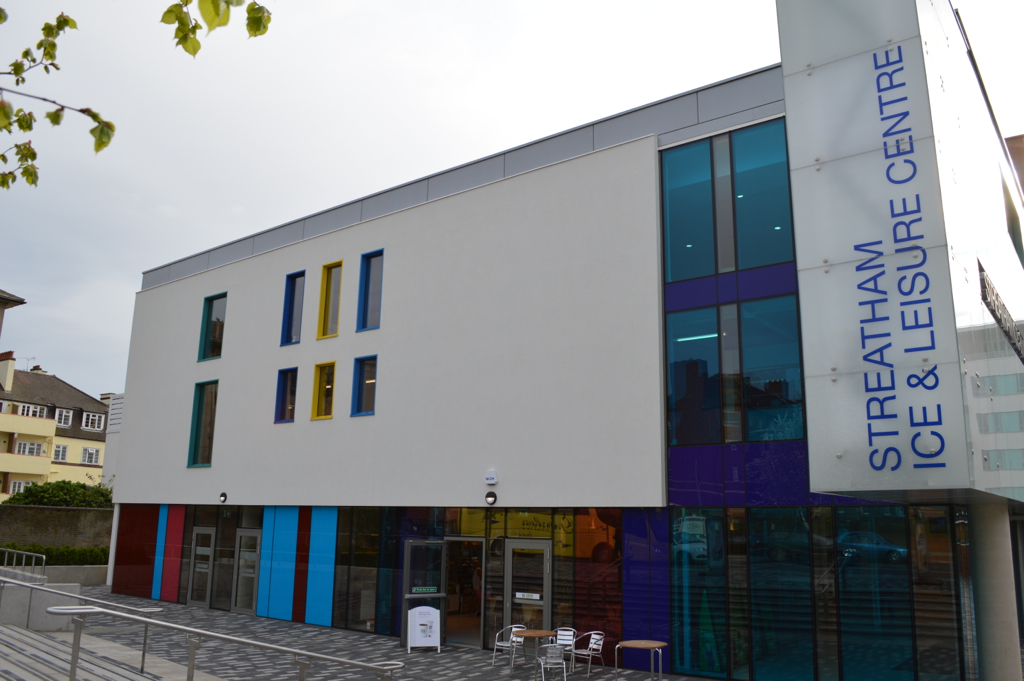
Streatham ice and leisure centre

After several years of delay and controversy over phasing, construction started in the autumn of 2011 on the Streatham Hub – a major redevelopment next to Streatham railway station. The project was a joint development by Lambeth Council and Tesco. The project involved the demolition of Streatham Ice Arena, Streatham Leisure Centre and the former Streatham Bus Garage, and their replacement with a new leisure centre and a Tesco store with 250 flats above it. Streatham Leisure Centre closed in November 2009 due to health and safety concerns when part of the pool hall ceiling collapsed. Streatham Ice Arena closed on 18 December 2011, having celebrated eighty years of operation in February 2011. For two years a temporary ice rink was provided at Popes Road, Brixton.

In November 2013, the new Streatham Ice and Leisure Centre opened to the public. The leisure centre houses a 60 m x 30 m indoor ice rink with 1,000 rink-side seats on the upper floors, a six-lane 25 m swimming pool, 13 m teaching pool, four-court sports hall and a gym with 100 stations.

The jazz venue Hideaway continues Streatham's long entertainment tradition. It features live performances of jazz, funk, swing and soul music as well as stand-up comedy nights. It won the Jazz Venue/Promoter of the Year category in the 2011 Parliamentary Jazz Awards. The venue closed indefinitely in March 2021 as a result of the COVID-19 pandemic

On 2 February 2020 at around 14:00 GMT, Sudesh Mamoor Faraz Amman attacked and injured two people using a machete on Streatham High Street in what police declared a terrorist incident. Alongside the machete, Amman was also wearing a vest with components made to look like improvised explosive devices. He was pursued by armed police and was shot dead outside a Boots pharmacy.

Streatham High Road also was host to Cat's Whiskers which later became Caesar's nightclub in the early 1990s through to 2005, which closed to become the site of the newly developed block of flats with a Marks & Spencer store and a Starbucks outlet.

== Streatham Common ==
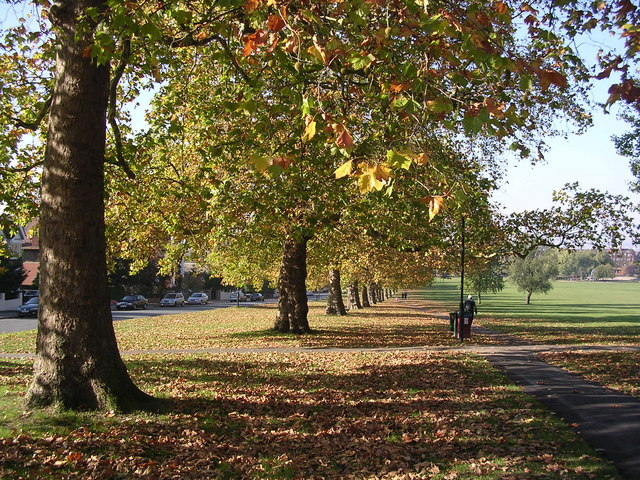
Streatham Common. Avenue of autumn trees looking down Streatham Common towards Streatham High Road

Streatham Common is a large open space on the southern edge of Streatham. The shallow sloping lower (western) half of the common is mostly mowed grass, and the upper (eastern) half is mostly woodland with some small areas of gorse scrub and acid grassland. The eastern half has been designated a Local Nature Reserve.

Adjacent to the historic common, there is a formal garden, The Rookery, formerly the grounds of a large house that housed visitors to one of Streatham's historic mineral wells.

Vincent Van Gogh drew a picture of Streatham Common in 1875. He included the picture alongside a letter to his brother Theo which read 'It’s a view of Streatham Common, a large, grass-covered area with oak trees and broom. It had rained in the night, and the ground was soggy here and there and the young spring grass fresh and green'.

== Administration ==
Streatham is covered by Lambeth London Borough Council. Until 2024, it was part of the parliamentary constituency of Streatham. However, since the 2024 general election, it has been part of the constituency of Streatham and Croydon North, currently represented by environment secretary Steve Reed of the Labour Party.

A map showing the Streatham ward of Wandsworth Metropolitan Borough as it appeared in 1916

On 1 April 1904 the civil parish was abolished to form Wandsworth Borough. At the 1901 census (the last before the abolition of the parish), Streatham had a population of 71,658.

== Demography ==
In the 2011 census, Streatham, comprising the wards of Streatham Hill, Streatham South and Streatham Wells, was White or White British (55.3%), Black or Black British (24.1%), Asian or Asian British (10%), Mixed/multiple ethnic groups (7.5%), and Other ethnic group (2.2%). The largest single ethnicity is White British (35.5%).

== Education ==
- Bishop Thomas Grant School
- Dunraven School
- Woodmansterne School
- Streatham & Clapham High School
- London Steiner School
- Sunnyhill Primary School
- Hitherfield Primary School
- Streatham Wells Primary School
- St Andrews RC Primary School
- Goldfinch Primary School
- Penwortham Primary School (Wandsworth)
- St Leonard's Primary School
- Broomwood Hall Lower School
- Henry Cavendish Primary School (Streatham campus)

== Sport ==
=== Cricket ===
On 9 July 1736, London Cricket Club played against Streatham Cricket Club on White Lion Fields in Streatham, but the result is unknown. This is the only reference to a Streatham cricket team in surviving sources.

=== Other sports ===
- Streatham RedHawks (ice hockey)
- Streatham-Croydon RFC
- Streatham Rovers FC
- Streatham United FC

== Places of worship ==
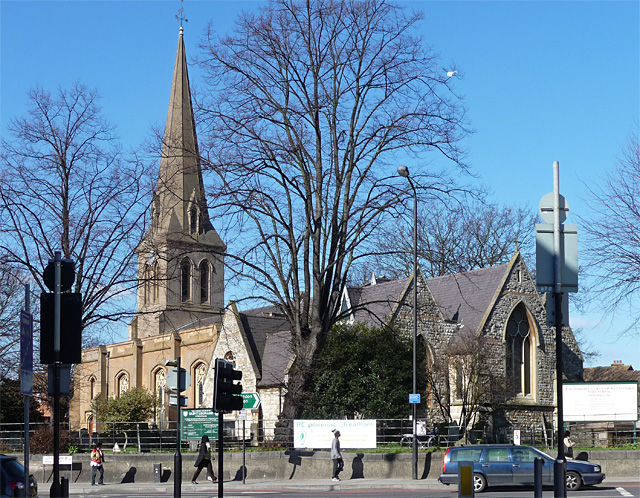
- St Leonard's Parish Church, Streatham
  St Leonard's Church (Church of England) - the historic parish church
- English Martyrs' Church (Roman Catholic) - located opposite St Leonard's - it is the second of Streatham's "twin spires"
- Christ Church, Streatham Hill (Church of England)
- Holy Redeemer Church, Streatham Vale (Church of England)
- Immanuel and St Andrew Church, Streatham (Church of England)
- St Margaret the Queen, Cricklade Avenue, Streatham Hill (Church of England)
- St Peter's Church, Streatham (Church of England)
- St Simon and St Jude, Hillside Road, Streatham Hill (Roman Catholic)
- Streatham Baptist Church, Lewin Road
- Hambro Road Baptist Church
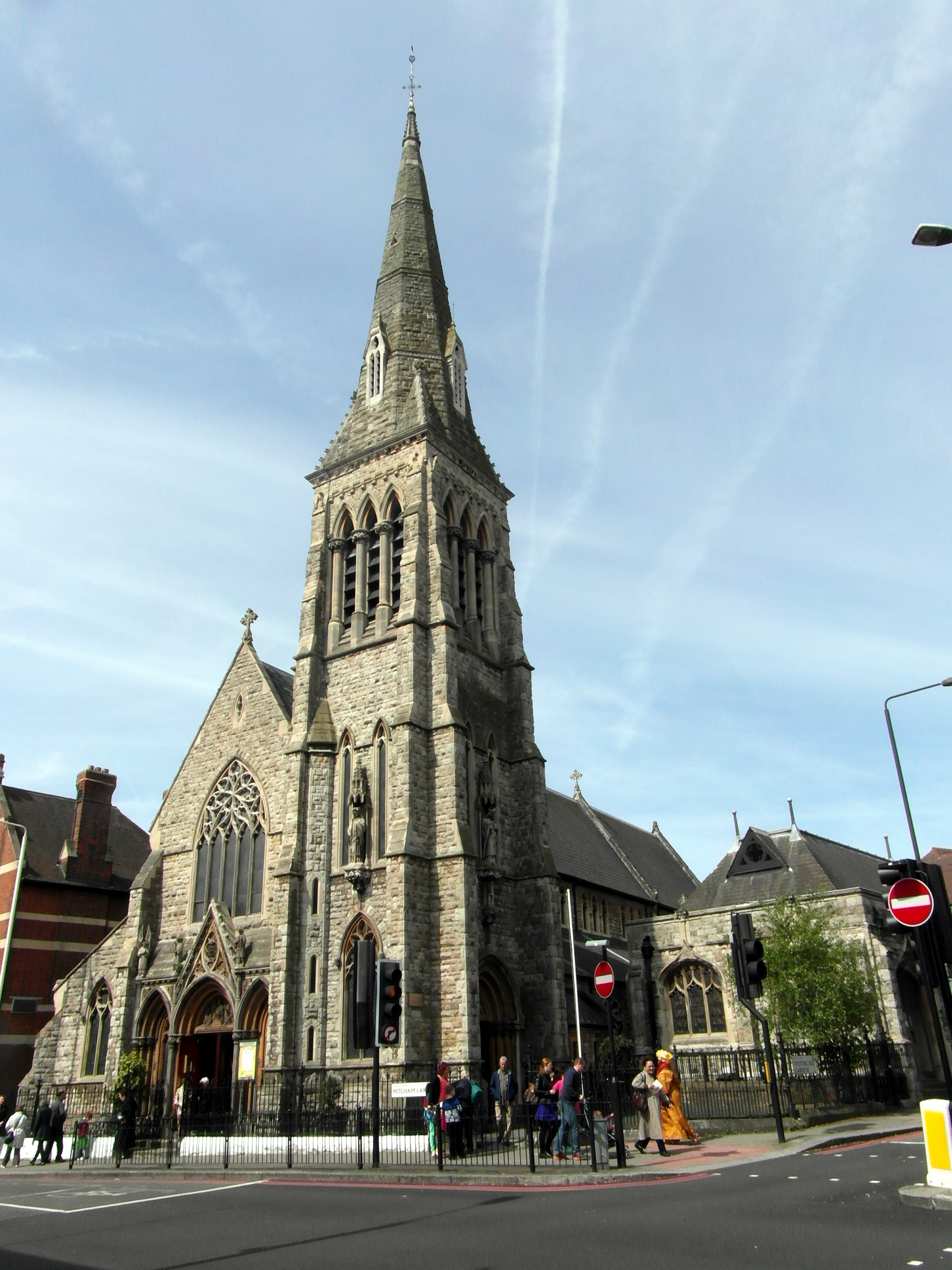
- RC Church of the English Martyrs, Streatham
  Streatham Methodist Church, Riggindale Road
- New Covenant Church, Pendennis Road
- Islamic Centre, Estreham Road (Shi’a)
- Streatham Friends Meeting House, Roupell Park Estate (Religious Society of Friends (Quakers))
- Streatham Mosque, Mitcham Lane (Sunni)
- Streatham Hill Mosque, Norfolk House Road (Sunni)
- South London Synagogue, Leigham Court Road (United Synagogue)
- South London Liberal Synagogue, Prentis Road (Liberal Judaism)
- Hitherfield Road Baptist Church Streatham {SW16 2LN}
- St James' Streatham, Mitcham Lane (SW16 6NT)
- Mitcham Lane Baptist Church, Mitcham Lane (SW16 6NT)
- St Albans - Evangelical, Pretoria Road (SW16 6RR)
- Streatham Central Church, Wellfield Road (SW16 2BP)

== Notable residents ==
Among the people who were born, lived or worked in Streatham, or are otherwise associated with the area are:

- Arthur Anderson, P&O founder, and Liberal Radical MP
- Jay Aston, Eurovision winner and Bucks Fizz/The Fizz member
- Lynda Baron, actor
- Jonathan Bartley, former co-leader of the Green Party
- Giuseppe Baretti, linguist
- Arnold Bax, composer
- Sarah Beeny, television presenter
- Floella Benjamin, actress and TV presenter
- Hywel Bennett, actor
- Ian Bostridge, Tenor
- Mark Bostridge, Writer
- Bernard Braden, Actor and TV personality
- Druce Brandt, cricketer
- Paul Briscoe, teacher and writer
- Henry Robertson Bowers, explorer
- Alexander Petersson, artist
- Edmund Burke, philosopher
- Charles Burney, composer and music historian
- Frances Burney, novelist and playwright
- Simon Callow, actor
- Naomi Campbell, model
- Geoffrey Cather, Victoria Cross-winning soldier
- Christopher Chessun, Anglican Bishop of Southwark - official residence in Streatham
- Nicholas Clay, actor
- Vera Conlon, archaeological photographer
- Lionel Crabb, George Medal recipient
- Aleister Crowley
- Dave, rapper
- Carl Davis, composer
- Peter Davison, actor
- Kevin Day, comedian
- Henry Doulton, founder Royal Doulton
- Siobhan Dowd, author
- William Dring, Portrait Artist, RA
- William Dyce, artist, professor
- Hester Maria Elphinstone, Viscountess Keith, literary correspondent
- Paul England, actor, director, and author, born in Streatham
- Edward Foster, Victoria Cross
- John Galliano, fashion designer
- David Garrick, actor
- Edward Stanley Gibbons, philatelist
- Oliver Goldsmith, novelist, playwright and poet
- Grooverider, DJ
- Isidore Gunsberg, Chess master
- David Gurr, author
- Derek Guyler, actor
- Will Hay, comedy actor and (as W I Hay) Fellow of the Royal Astronomical Society, writer and astronomer
- Jeremy Hardy, comedian
- David Harewood, actor
- Sir Norman Hartnell, royal dressmaker
- Patricia Hayes, actor
- Hy Hazell, actress
- Sir Arthur Helps, writer
- Benjamin Hoadley, Bishop
- Glyn Hodges, professional footballer and manager
- Roy Hudd, comedian and TV personality
- Rachel Hurd-Wood, actor
- Eddie Izzard, comedian and actor
- David Jacobs, TV and radio presenter
- Alan Johnson, MP
- Frederick Henry Johnson, Victoria Cross
- Dr Samuel Johnson, author and lexicographer
- Sadiq Khan, Mayor of London
- Zardad Khan, Afghan warlord
- Mark King, musician
- Winifred Knights, artist
- Arthur Moore Lascelles, Victoria Cross recipient
- Benny Lee, entertainer
- Ken Livingstone, former MP and former Mayor of London
- Laurence Llewelyn-Bowen, interior designer
- John Major, Prime Minister 1990–97, lived at Primrose Court 1969-74
- Horace Brooks Marshall, Lord Mayor of London
- Ken Mackintosh, dance band leader
- Cathy McGowan, television presenter
- Paul Merton, comedian
- Roger Moore, actor
- Naga Munchetty, TV presenter
- VS Naipaul, nobel prizewinner literature
- Rudy Narayan, barrister and civil rights activist
- Nanette Newman, British actress
- Belgrave Ninnis, Explorer, Doctor
- Belgrave Edward Sutton Ninnis, explorer, Royal Fusiliers
- David Nixon, TV magician
- Steven Norris, former MP and London Mayoral Candidate
- Daphne Park, Baroness and British Spy
- Cynthia Payne, celebrity madame
- Horatio Frederick Phillips, aviation pioneer
- Alistair Pirrie, TV presenter
- Patricia Plunkett, actor
- Steve Reed, MP
- Sir Joshua Reynolds, artist
- Geoffrey Rimbault, first-class cricketer and British Army officer
- Catherine Russell, actor
- Arthur Sanders, WW2 RAF commander, Air Chief Marshal
- Duncan Sandys, Life Peer, MP
- Leslie Scarman, Baron Scarman, Law Lord
- Lord Shelburne, prime minister
- Alan Simpson, Comedy script writer
- Arnold Spencer-Smith, explorer
- Michaela Strachan, TV presenter and actress
- Graham Sutherland, artist
- Henry Tate, sugar merchant and philanthropist
- Shaw Taylor, actor and TV presenter
- Hester Thrale, author and patron of the arts
- Henry Thrale, MP and brewer
- Nina Toussaint-White, actress
- John Torode, chef and TV presenter
- Stan Tracey, jazz musician
- Tommy Trinder, comedian
- Leonora Tyson, suffragist
- Chuka Umunna, former Labour and Liberal Democrat MP
- Dennis Wheatley, author
- June Whitfield, actress
- W. P. D. Wightman FRSE (1899–1983), scientific author
- John Lewis Wolfe (1798–1881), architect, artist and stockbroker
- Bill Wyman, musician
- Raman Subba Row, English cricketer
- Andy Zaltzman, comedian

== Nearest places ==
- Balham
- Brixton
- Colliers Wood
- Clapham Park
- Crystal Palace
- Furzedown
- Herne Hill
- Mitcham
- Norbury
- Pollards Hill
- Thornton Heath
- Tooting
- Tooting Bec
- Tulse Hill
- Upper Norwood
- West Norwood
- Wimbledon

== Transport ==
=== Railway stations ===
Streatham has three railway stations: Streatham, Streatham Common, and Streatham Hill. There are also stations at nearby Balham and Norbury.

=== Tube stations ===
The nearest tube stations are at Brixton, on the Victoria line, and Tooting Bec, on the Northern line.

== Bibliography ==
- Buckley, G. B. (1935). Fresh Light on 18th Century Cricket. Birmingham: Cotterell & Co. OCLC 23450280.
