= Richard Bathurst =

British essayist and physician (died 1762)

Richard Bathurst (died 1762) was a British essayist and physician, born in Jamaica and sent to England to study medicine.

His father, Colonel Bathurst, brought to England in 1750 Francis Barber, who became famous as Samuel Johnson's black servant. "My dear friend, Dr. Bathurst", said Dr. Johnson, "declared he was glad that his father, who was a West India planter, had left his affairs in total ruin, because, having no estate, he was not under the temptation of having slaves". In 1745, Bathurst took the degree of M.B. at Peterhouse, Cambridge, and afterwards studied medicine in London, where he made the acquaintance of Dr. Johnson, and was a member of the club at the King's Head. "Dear Bathurst", Johnson used to say (Piozzi's Anecdotes) "was a man to my heart's content; he hated a fool and he hated a rogue, and he hated a whig: he was a very good hater." Bathurst was a contributor to The Adventurer, the newspaper conducted by Hawkesworth, with the assistance of Johnson and Joseph Warton.

In September 1754, Bathurst was elected physician to the Middlesex Hospital, but went to Barbados, whence he wrote two letters to Johnson in 1757 (published by Croker), and became an army physician in the expedition against Havannah, where he died of fever in 1762. "The Havannah is taken; a conquest too dearly obtained" exclaimed Johnson, "for Bathurst died before it. Vix Priamus tanti totaque Troja fuit. Boswell says, on Mrs. Williams's authority, that Dr. Johnson dictated the essays in The Adventurer signed "T." to Bathurst, who wrote them down and sold them for two guineas each to his own benefit. Johnson would not acknowledge them, but smiled when he said he did not write them. It is a curious fact that Dr. Johnson often named Bathurst in his prayers after the death of the latter.
