= Thrale =

Thrale is a surname. Notable people with the surname include:

- Henry Thrale (1724/1730?–1781), British politician
- Hester Thrale (1741–1821), Welsh-born diarist, author, and patron of the arts
