= Streatham Worthies =

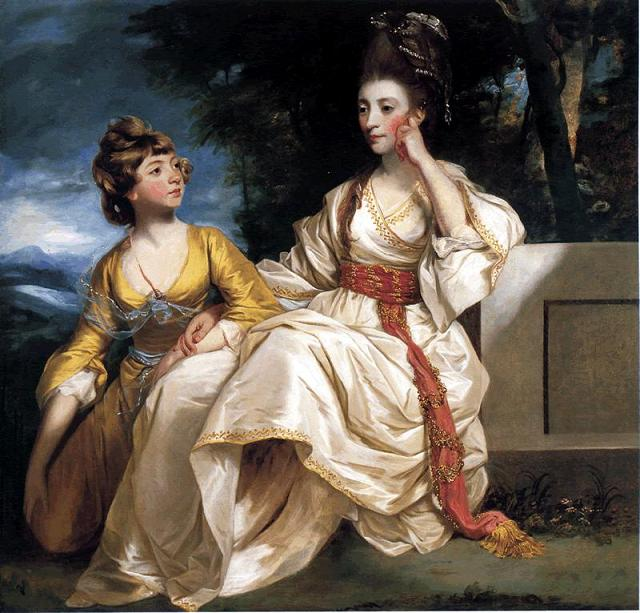
Double portrait of Hester Thrale and eldest daughter Hester Maria Thrale, 1777-78.

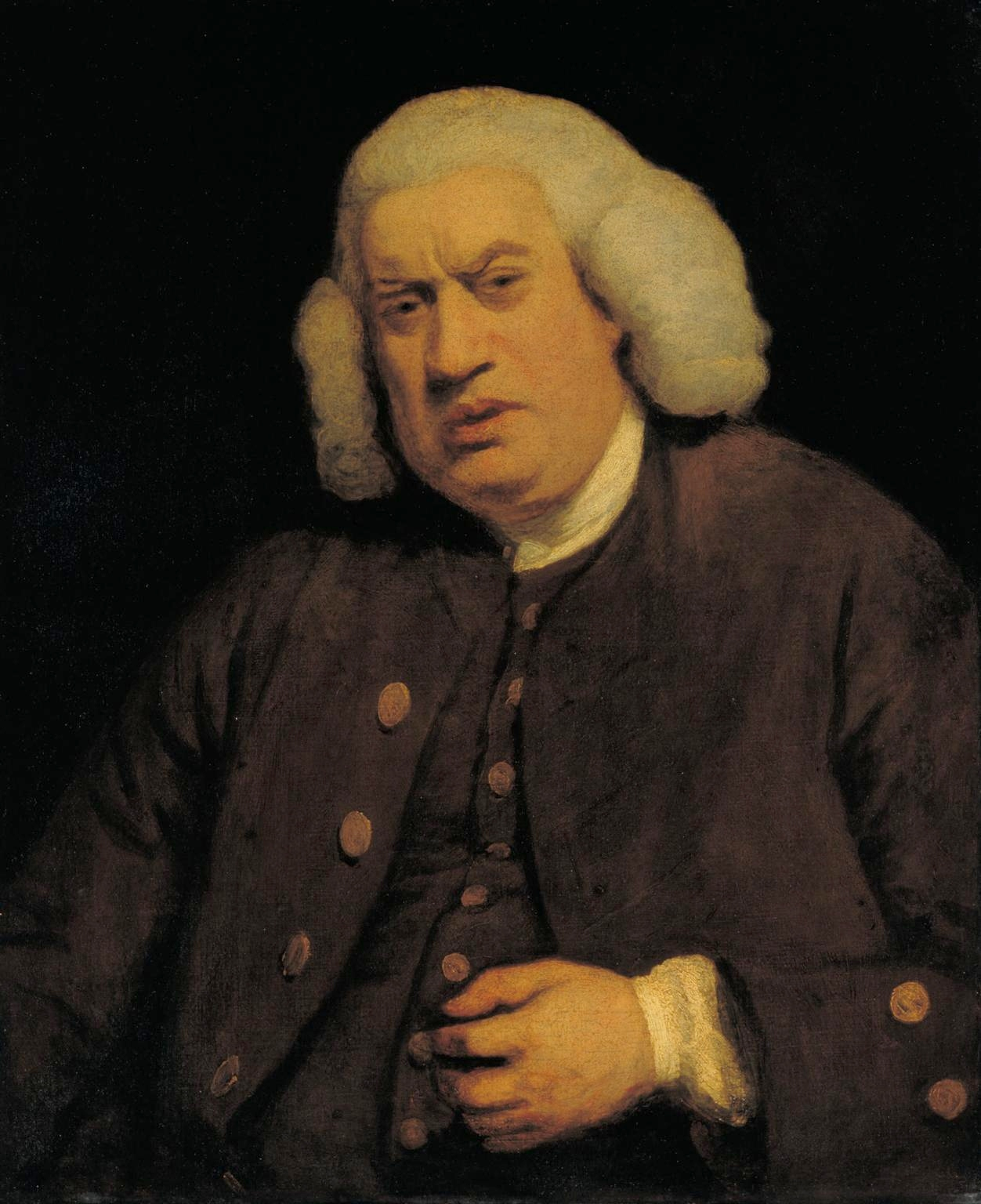
Samuel Johnson by Joshua Reynolds, 1772?

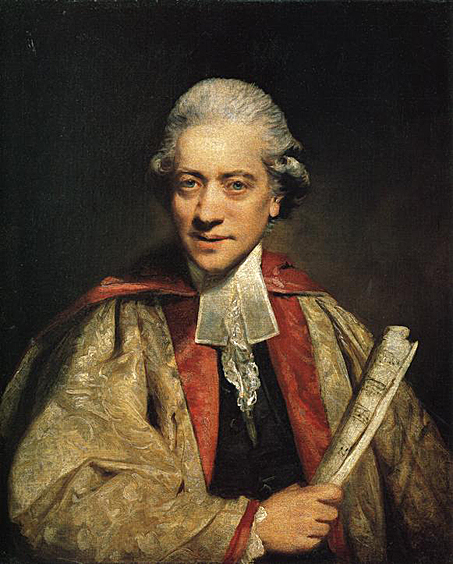
Charles Burney, 1781

The Streatham Worthies is the collective description for the circle of literary and cultural figures around the wealthy brewer Henry Thrale and his wife Hester Thrale who assembled at his country retreat Streatham Park and were commemorated by a series of portraits by Joshua Reynolds.

Reynolds painted these portraits over the course of about ten years. As well as the twelve bust-length male portraits, Reynolds also painted a double portrait of Thrale's wife Hester, and their daughter Hester Maria, nicknamed 'Queeney'. The usage the 'Streatham Worthies' was first coined by the novelist Fanny Burney to describe the portraits. It is generally believed to be a playful reference to the celebrated 'Temple of British Worthies' at Stowe House. The portraits were hung above the bookshelves in the library at Streatham Park. Burney noted that Thrale wanted: "the persons he most loved to contemplate... to preside over the literature that stood highest in his estimation".

== Members ==
The members of the Worthies were:

- Oliver Goldsmith – Irish novelist and playwright (this c.1772 portrait is now in the National Gallery of Ireland, Dublin)
- Giuseppe Marc'Antonio Baretti literary critic and translator (this 1773 portrait is now in a private collection)
- Edmund Burke – philosopher (this 1774 portrait is now in the Scottish National Portrait Gallery, Edinburgh)
- Joshua Reynolds – painter (Reynold's 1775 self portrait is now in at Tate Britain)
- Samuel Johnson – author and lexicographer (this portrait, perhaps of 1772 – before 1778 in any case – is also now at Tate Britain)
- Charles Burney – composer and music historian (this 1781 portrait is in the National Portrait Gallery, London)
- David Garrick – actor (this 1775 portrait is now in the Hyde Collection at Houghton Library, Harvard University)
- Arthur Murphy
- Edwin Sandys
- William Henry Lyttelton
- Sir Robert Chambers – jurist and judge
- Henry Thrale himself (this 1777 portrait is now in the Hyde Collection at Houghton Library, Harvard University)

The double portrait of Hester Thrale and eldest daughter Hester Maria Thrale is also normally regarded as part of the set. This 1777-8 portrait is in the Beaverbrook Art Gallery, New Brunswick.

Mrs Thrale wrote that Sir Philip Jennings-Clerke had pressed her to include him in the list of Worthies. Commentators have sometimes used the term for the wider intellectual circle around the Thrales and Johnson, in particular to include Fanny Burney and Elizabeth Montagu.

== Dispersal ==
The portraits were dispersed on the sale of the contents of Streatham Park in 1816.

In 2005 the first six portraits of the worthies as listed above were reunited in a single room with Reynold's portrait of Mrs Thrale and Hester Maria for the Tate Britain exhibition Joshua Reynolds – The Creation of Celebrity.
