= Hester Maria Elphinstone, Viscountess Keith =

British literary correspondent (1764–1857)

The Right Honourable The Viscountess Keith
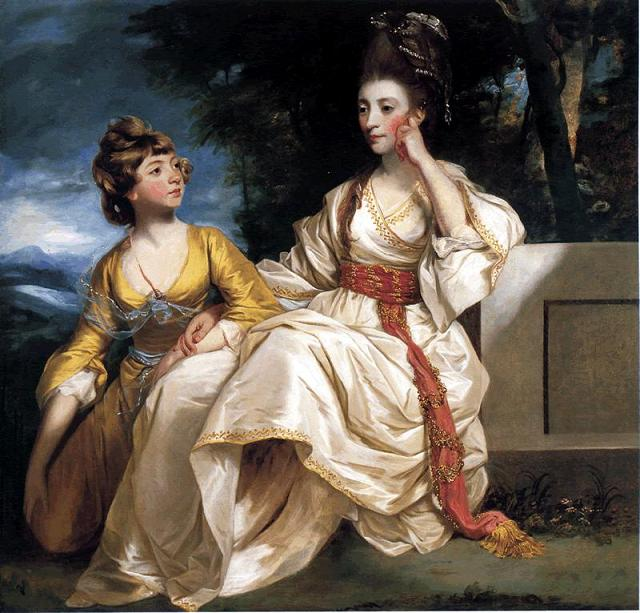
- Hester Maria "Queeney" Thrale (left) aged 15, with her mother Hester; Painted by Sir Joshua Reynolds (1781)
- Born: 17 September 1764; Southwark, England
- Died: 31 March 1857 (aged 92); London, England
- Spouse: George Elphinstone, 1st Viscount Keith
- Children: 1

Hester Maria Elphinstone, Viscountess Keith, born Hester Maria Thrale (17 September 1764 – 31 March 1857), was a British literary correspondent and intellectual. She was the eldest child of Hester Thrale, diarist, author and confidante of Samuel Johnson, and Henry Thrale, a wealthy brewer and patron of the arts. She became the second wife of George Elphinstone, 1st Viscount Keith.

== Childhood and education ==
Johnson gave Hester Maria her lifelong nickname "Queeney" (after Queen Esther) early in her childhood, and was a regular correspondent of the little girl as well as of her mother. Queeney Thrale was born in Southwark, where her father's brewery was situated, and grew up mainly at the family home, Streatham Park in South London, which was the focus of an important coterie of political, artistic and literary figures known as the Streatham Worthies. She showed early signs of a good memory and sharp intellect, and by age six she was regarded as a greater prodigy than her intelligent and accomplished mother. She studied Latin with Dr Johnson, working alongside the novelist Frances Burney, another family protégée, and also Italian, with Joseph Baretti, and Hebrew. She was painted by Zoffany at 20 months, and she and her mother were the joint subjects of a portrait by Sir Joshua Reynolds in 1781, as were other members of the Streatham park circle.

Queeney's early life and accomplishments were recorded in The Family Book and Thraliana, which Hester Thrale began on her eldest daughter's second birthday. The Family Book records Queeney's childhood and education, her grasp of languages, astronomy, geography and other subjects. Thraliana details her liking for the notorious Mad Jack Fuller, whose proposal of marriage was later rejected by her sister Susannah. Queeney's father died in 1781, and in 1784 her mother married the children's Italian music teacher, Gabriele Mario Piozzi, a Roman Catholic, causing public scandal and leading to a rift with them. The newlyweds went abroad for more than two years and between July 1787 and March 1793 there was no communication between her and her daughter Queeney who went on to make an independent London life for herself, with a respectable widowed friend as chaperone.

== Marriage and children ==
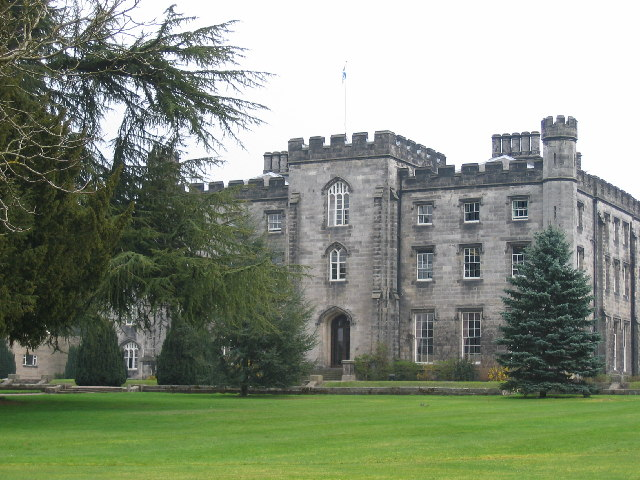
Tulliallan Castle

On 10 January 1808, aged 44, Queeney Thrale married the widowed Admiral Lord Keith, a distinguished and celebrated senior naval officer 19 years her senior who had amassed a considerable fortune from prize-money during the Napoleonic Wars. They had met in 1791, four years after the death of Lord Keith's first wife, and corresponded for 16 years before their marriage. Lord and Lady Keith were a prominent and well-connected society couple: they had one daughter, the Hon Georgina Augusta, born in December 1809, and the baby's sponsors were the Prince of Wales and the Duke of Clarence, both future kings of the United Kingdom.

== Later life and death ==
After Napoleon's final defeat in 1815, Lord Keith retired from the Royal Navy and the family lived mainly on their large estate at Tulliallan, where they had a magnificent castle constructed which is now the Scottish Police College. Left a wealthy widow when their daughter was 13, Lady Keith lived another 34 years, dying in Piccadilly, London on 31 March 1857, aged 92.

She is buried in Kensal Green Cemetery, and her grave is marked by a monument which is Listed Grade II for its striking, proto-Arts and Crafts Gothic style.

== Literature ==
The "Queeney letters", a large collection of letters addressed to Queeney by Johnson, Fanny Burney and her mother Hester was published in 1934.

== In fiction ==
- Beryl Bainbridge's Booker-longlisted novel According to Queeney (2001), a fictionalised account of the last days of Dr Johnson, features Hester Maria Thrale as one of its main characters.
- She also features in Patrick O'Brian's Aubrey-Maturin series of novels as the childhood friend and mathematics tutor of Captain Jack Aubrey; her husband being his mentor in his naval career. The first Aubrey-Maturin novel, Master and Commander, begins in April 1800 and describes Queeney as "newly married" to Lord Keith only a few months later; in fact the marriage did not take place until 1808.
