= Katherine Balderston =

American scholar

Professor Katherine Canby Balderston
- Born: January 2, 1895; Boise, Idaho
- Died: November 21, 1979 (aged 84); South Natick, Massachusetts
- Awards: Rose Mary Crawshay Prize (1941)

Academic background
- Education: Yale University

Academic work
- Discipline: English literature
- Sub-discipline: 18th-century
- Institutions: Wellesley College
- Notable works: The Collected Letters of Oliver Goldsmith (1928)

Katherine Canby Balderston (January 2, 1895, Boise, Idaho – November 21, 1979, South Natick, Massachusetts) was an American scholar of 18th century English literature. She was the first female faculty member at Southern Methodist University and later a professor emerita at Wellesley College. She was a winner of the Rose Mary Crawshay Prize in 1941.

== Life ==
Katherine Canby Balderston was born in Boise, Idaho, one of four children. Her father, William Balderston, was an editor of the Boise Statesman, while her mother Stella would become the Idaho State Librarian. She graduated from Wellesley College in 1916 with a bachelor's degree, Radcliffe College with a master's, and obtained her doctorate from Yale University. She was a member of the Wellesley basketball team at the time of her graduation.

After graduating, Balderston was hired as an instructor at Southern Methodist University. She was the first female member of the faculty.

Balderston researched Oliver Goldsmith's life and letters, uncovering previously unknown details about his relations with his family, as well as the creation of his play She Stoops To Conquer in The Collected Letters of Oliver Goldsmith, which she edited and published in 1928. She established that the character of the father in The Vicar of Wakefield, which was hitherto thought to be based on Goldsmith's own, was rather an idealised parent that he wished to have had; similarly, the idealised village of Sweet Auburn, thought to have been his village in Ireland, was rather an English town that Goldsmith preferred to have grown up in.

Balderston edited and published the Thraliana, the diaries of Hester Thrale. One of her contentions (challenged by later scholars) was that Thrale had some sort of sadomasochistic hold over Samuel Johnson. This book won the Rose Mary Crawshay Prize in 1941.

In 1942, she was made Martha Hale Shackford professor of English literature at Wellesley, which she held till retirement. She died in a nursing home in South Natick, Massachusetts in 1979.

== Selected works ==
- The History and Sources of Percy's Memoir of Goldsmith. Cambridge University. 1926.
- The Collected Letters of Oliver Goldsmith. Cambridge University. 1928.
- Balderston, Katherine, ed. (1951). Thraliana: The Diary of Mrs Hester Lynch Thrale (Later Mrs. Piozzi) 1776-1809. Clarendon.
