= SW postcode area =

Postcode area within the United Kingdom

London SW
- Postcode area
- Location within the United Kingdom
- Coordinates: 51.462°N 0.169°W
- Sovereign state: United Kingdom
- Postcode area: SW
- Postcode area name: London SW
- Post towns: 1
- Postcode districts: 29
- Postcode sectors: 139
- Postcodes (live): 19,890
- Postcodes (total): 36,392
- Statistics as at May 2020

The SW (South Western) postcode area, also known as the London SW postcode area, is a group of 20 postcode districts within the London post town in England. The area comprises the South Western operational district (covering the subdivisions of postcode district SW1, plus SW2–SW10) and the Battersea operational district (covering SW11–SW20), and is the only area within the London post town to lie on both sides of the River Thames.

Mail for the area is sorted at the Jubilee Mail Centre in Hounslow, along with mail for the TW, KT and GU postcode areas.

== Postal administration ==
The postcode area originated in 1857 as the SW district. In 1868 it gained some of the area of the very short-lived S district, with the rest going to SE. It was divided into numbered districts in 1917. The South Western district consists of the postcode districts SW1–SW10 and the once Battersea-headquartered component consists of the postcode districts SW11–SW20.

The South Western head district was designated as SW1 and the rest of the numbering followed, alphabetically, by their most important parish, chapelry, topological or built environment feature names, up to 10. Similarly as to the Battersea SW11 once "head district".

=== List of postcode districts ===
The approximate coverage of the postcode districts, with the historic postal district names shown in italics:

Postcode district	Post town	Coverage	Local authority area(s)
SW1A	London	Whitehall, Downing Street, Buckingham Palace, the Houses of Parliament and west of St James's	Westminster
SW1E	London	Northern "Victoria" around Buckingham Gate (a street) to include both sides of part of Victoria Street	Westminster
SW1H	London	Surrounds of St James's Park tube station centred on Broadway, Queen Anne's Gate and Old Queen Street to include both sides of part of Victoria Street – derivation: Horse Guards Parade	Westminster
SW1P	London	A projection around Parliament Square. Nearby Westminster School to Westminster Cathedral to CCAL, University of the Arts, London (omitting all backstreets nearest to Vauxhall Bridge Road) – derivation: Parliament Square	Westminster
SW1V	London	between Vauxhall Bridge, Grosvenor (or Victoria Railway) Bridge and Victoria Station, taking in both sides of Vauxhall Bridge Road; includes Pimlico	Westminster
SW1W	London	South or lower Belgravia and Chelsea (a corner), from Sloane Square to Victoria Station to Grosvenor Waterside basin	Westminster, Kensington and Chelsea
SW1X	London	Rest of Belgravia (north of Eaton Square), Knightsbridge (eastern half) and Chelsea (a corner)	Westminster, Kensington and Chelsea
SW1Y	London	All but the west of St James's	Westminster
SW2	London	Brixton district: Brixton Hill, Tulse Hill (part), Brixton (part), Streatham Hill, Clapham Park (part), Lambeth	Lambeth
SW3	London	Chelsea district: Chelsea, Brompton, Knightsbridge (part)	Kensington and Chelsea
SW4	London	Clapham district: Clapham, Balham (part), Stockwell (part)	Lambeth, Wandsworth
SW5	London	Earls Court district: Earl's Court	Kensington and Chelsea
SW6	London	Fulham district: Fulham, Parsons Green	Hammersmith and Fulham
SW7	London	South Kensington district: South Kensington, Knightsbridge (part)	Kensington and Chelsea, Westminster
SW8	London	South Lambeth district: South Lambeth, Vauxhall, Nine Elms (east), Clapham (north), Stockwell (northwest), Oval (west)	Lambeth, Wandsworth
SW9	London	Stockwell district: Brixton, Stockwell, Clapham (part), Oval (part)	Lambeth
SW10	London	Brompton district: West Brompton, Chelsea (part)	Kensington and Chelsea, Hammersmith and Fulham
SW11	London	Battersea head district: Battersea, Nine Elms (west) Balham (part)	Wandsworth
SW12	London	Balham district: Balham, Clapham Park (part), Wandsworth Common (part)	Wandsworth, Lambeth
SW13	London	Barnes district: Barnes	Richmond upon Thames
SW14	London	Mortlake district: Mortlake, East Sheen	Richmond upon Thames
SW15	London	Putney district: Putney, Roehampton, Kingston Vale, Putney Heath, Putney Vale, Richmond Park, Roehampton Vale	Wandsworth, Kingston upon Thames, Richmond upon Thames
SW16	London	Streatham district: Streatham, Streatham Common, Norbury, Streatham Park, Furzedown, Streatham Vale, Mitcham Common, Pollards Hill, Eastfields, West Norwood (part)	Lambeth, Croydon, Wandsworth, Merton
SW17	London	Tooting district: Tooting, Summerstown, Mitcham (part), Furzedown, small part of Wimbledon around Plough Lane	Wandsworth, Merton
SW18	London	Wandsworth district: Wandsworth Town, Southfields, Earlsfield	Wandsworth
SW19	London	Wimbledon district: Wimbledon, Colliers Wood, Merton Park, Merton Abbey, Southfields, Morden (part)	Merton, Wandsworth
SW20	London	West Wimbledon district: Raynes Park, Lower Morden, Merton Park, Wimbledon Chase, very small part of the east of New Malden	Merton, Kingston upon Thames

=== SW1 ===
SW1 is the South Western head district. Since about the 1890s it has had a surplus of addresses and buildings for practical division into one set of inwards codes so is divided into smaller postcode districts since 1917 used for mail purposes. SW1 is used in geographic reference, street signs and colloquial use across most communities. Its eight subdivisions continue to be classed as one 'district'. Within SW1A are keynote inward codes including:

- SW1A 0AA – House of Commons
- SW1A 0PW – House of Lords, Palace of Westminster
- SW1A 1AA – Buckingham Palace
- SW1A 1BA – Clarence House, Residence of King Charles III during restoration of Buckingham Palace
- SW1A 2AA – 10 Downing Street, Prime Minister and First Lord of the Treasury
- SW1A 2AB – 11 Downing Street, Chancellor of the Exchequer
- SW1A 2AH – Foreign and Commonwealth Office, King Charles Street
- SW1A 2HQ – HM Treasury headquarters

=== SW19 ===
SW19 is the postcode that covers Wimbledon and is used as a metonym for the Wimbledon Championships tennis tournament.

== Boundaries ==
The SW postcode area covers parts of nine London Boroughs. North of the River Thames, it covers the southern parts of the City of Westminster, the Royal Borough of Kensington and Chelsea and the London Borough of Hammersmith and Fulham. South of the river, it covers all of the London Borough of Wandsworth, the western part of the London Borough of Lambeth, the northern parts of the London Boroughs of Merton and Croydon and the northeastern parts of the London Boroughs of Richmond upon Thames and Kingston upon Thames.

== Map ==
SW postcode area map, showing postcode districts in red and post towns in grey text, with links to nearby CR, EC, KT, SE, SM, TW, W and WC postcode areas.

== See also ==
- Postcode Address File
- List of postcode areas in the United Kingdom
- London postal district
