= Francis Barber =

Jamaican manservant and assistant of Samuel Johnson (c. 1742/3 –1801)

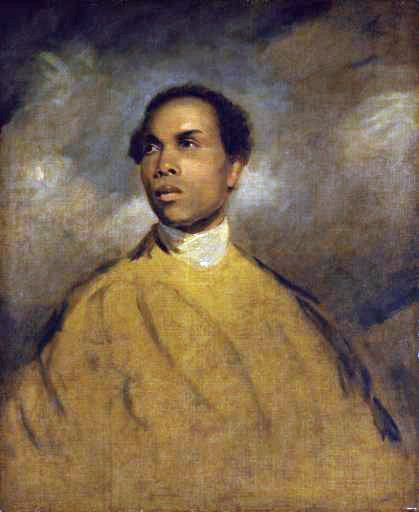
Portrait possibly of Barber, attributed either to James Northcote or Sir Joshua Reynolds (see below), 1770s

Francis Barber (c. 1742/3 – 13 January 1801), born Quashey, was the Jamaican manservant of Samuel Johnson in London from 1752 until Johnson's death in 1784. Johnson made him his residual heir, with £70 (equivalent to £9,000 in 2025) a year to be given him by trustees, expressing the wish that he moves from London to Lichfield, Staffordshire, Johnson's native city. After Johnson's death, Barber did this, opening a draper's shop and marrying a local woman. Barber was also bequeathed Johnson's books and papers, and a gold watch. In later years he had acted as Johnson's assistant in revising his famous Dictionary of the English Language and other works. Barber was also an important source for James Boswell concerning Johnson's life in the years before Boswell himself knew Johnson.

== Biography ==
Barber was born a slave in Jamaica on a sugarcane plantation belonging to the Bathurst family. His original name was Quashey, which is a common name for men of Coromantee origin.

At the age of about 10, he was brought to England by his owner, Colonel Richard Bathurst, whose son, also called Richard, was a close friend of Johnson. Barber was sent to school in Yorkshire. Johnson's wife Elizabeth died in 1752, plunging Johnson into a depression that Barber later vividly described to James Boswell. The Bathursts sent Barber to Johnson as a valet, arriving two weeks after her death. Although the legal validity of slavery in England was ambiguous at this time (and the Somersett's Case of 1772 did not clarify it, only ruling that it was illegal to transport a slave out of England against his will), when the elder Bathurst died two years later he gave Barber his freedom in his will, with a small legacy of £12 (equivalent to £2,000 in 2025). Johnson himself was an outspoken opponent of slavery, not just in England but in the American colonies as well.

=== Royal Navy ===
Barber then went to work for an apothecary in Cheapside but kept in touch with Johnson. He later signed up as a sailor for the Navy. He served as a "landsman" aboard various ships, received regular pay and good reports, saw the coast of Britain from Leith to Torbay, and acquired a taste for tobacco. He was discharged "three days before George II died", in other words on 22 October 1760, and returned to London and to Johnson to be his servant. Barber's brief maritime career is known from James Boswell's Life of Johnson:

His negro servant, Francis Barber, having left him, and been some time at sea, not pressed as has been supposed, but with his own consent, it appears from a letter to John Wilkes, Esq., from Dr. Smollet, that his master kindly interested himself in procuring his release from a state of life of which Johnson always expressed the utmost abhorrence. He said, 'No man will be a sailor who has contrivance enough to get himself into a jail; for being in a ship is being in a jail, with the chance of being drowned.' And at another time, 'A man in a jail has more room, better food, and commonly better company.' The letter was as follows:--

Chelsea, March 16, 1759.

DEAR SIR,

I am again your petitioner, in behalf of that great CHAM of literature, Samuel Johnson. His black servant, whose name is Francis Barber, has been pressed on board the Stag Frigate, Captain Angel, and our lexicographer is in great distress. He says the boy is a sickly lad, of a delicate frame, and particularly subject to a malady in his throat, which renders him very unfit for his Majesty's service. You know what manner of animosity the said Johnson has against you; and I dare say you desire no other opportunity of resenting it than that of laying him under an obligation. He was humble enough to desire my assistance on this occasion, though he and I were never cater-cousins; and I gave him to understand that I would make application to my friend Mr. Wilkes, who, perhaps, by his interest with Dr. Hay and Mr. Elliot, might be able to procure the discharge of his lacquey. It would be superfluous to say more on the subject, which I leave to your own consideration; but I cannot let slip this opportunity of declaring that I am, with the most inviolable esteem and attachment, dear Sir,

Your affectionate, obliged, humble servant,

T. SMOLLET.'

Mr. Wilkes, who upon all occasions has acted, as a private gentleman, with most polite liberality, applied to his friend Sir George Hay, then one of the Lords Commissioners of the Admiralty; and Francis Barber was discharged, as he has told me, without any wish of his own. He found his old master in Chambers in the Inner Temple[1047], and returned to his service.

== Further education ==
Later Johnson sent Barber, by then probably aged 22 (1767), to Bishop's Stortford Grammar School, presumably so that he could act as Johnson's assistant. From Boswell's Life:

His sincere regard for Francis Barber, his faithful negro servant, made him so desirous of his further improvement, that he now placed him at a school at Bishop Stortford, in Hertfordshire. This humane attention does Johnson's heart much honour. Out of many letters which Mr. Barber received from his master, he has preserved three, which he kindly gave me, and which I shall insert according to their dates.

To MR. FRANCIS BARBER.

DEAR FRANCIS,

I have been very much out of order. I am glad to hear that you are well, and design to come soon to see you. I would have you stay at Mrs. Clapp's for the present, till I can determine what we shall do. Be a good boy[185].

My compliments to Mrs. Clapp and to Mr. Fowler. I am, Your's affectionately, SAM. JOHNSON'.

May 28, 1768.

=== Later years ===
Barber is mentioned frequently in James Boswell's Life of Johnson and other contemporary sources, and there are at least two versions of a portrait, one now in Dr Johnson's House, which may be of him. Most recent art historians thought it was probably painted by James Northcote, or perhaps by Northcote's master Sir Joshua Reynolds, who was one of Barber's trustees under the will. An alternative view, recently expressed on a BBC programme, is that it is by Reynolds himself, but of his own black servant, not Barber.

When making his will, Johnson asked Sir John Hawkins, later his first biographer, what provision he should make for Barber. Sir John said that a nobleman would give 50 pounds a year (equivalent to £6,000 in 2025). Then I shall be "nobilissimus" replied Johnson, and give him 70 (equivalent to £9,000 in 2025). Hawkins disapproved, and after Johnson's death criticised his "ostentatious bounty [and] favour to negroes". The bequest was indeed widely covered in the press. Johnson, in fact, left £750 (equivalent to £96,000 in 2025) in the trust of his friend Bennet Langton from which he was expected to pay an annuity.

Barber moved with his family to a rented terrace house in Lichfield, Johnson's birthplace, where – as a Gentleman's Magazine correspondent reported – he spent his time "in fishing, cultivating a few potatoes, and a little reading". Later he opened up a small village school in nearby Burntwood. The money from his inheritance did not last and Barber sold off his store of Johnson memorabilia to defray his debts. Johnson's biographers, Hawkins and Hester Piozzi, were critical of Barber's marriage to a white woman. He died in Stafford on 13 January 1801, due to an unsuccessful operation at Staffordshire Royal Infirmary. He was survived by his son, Samuel Barber, his daughter, Ann, and his wife, Elizabeth. Samuel became a Methodist lay preacher, while Elizabeth and Ann set up a small school. Both Samuel and Ann married white partners. Barber's descendants still farm near Lichfield.

== Legacy ==
Barber appears as a character in the 2015 play Mr Foote's Other Leg, by Ian Kelly.

John Thieme's novel, The Book of Francis Barber: A Legatee's Journal (2018) is a loose fictional autobiography, centred on the period after Johnson's death and Barber's move to Lichfield.

A plaque in Barber's honour on the railings of his and Johnson's former London home at 17 Gough Square (now Dr Johnson's House) was unveiled in 2016, by his great-great-great-great-grandson, Cedric Barber.

== See also ==
- Edward Thaddeus Barleycorn Barber
- Black British
- Historical immigration to Great Britain
