= Furzedown =

Coordinates: 51.427°N 0.153°W

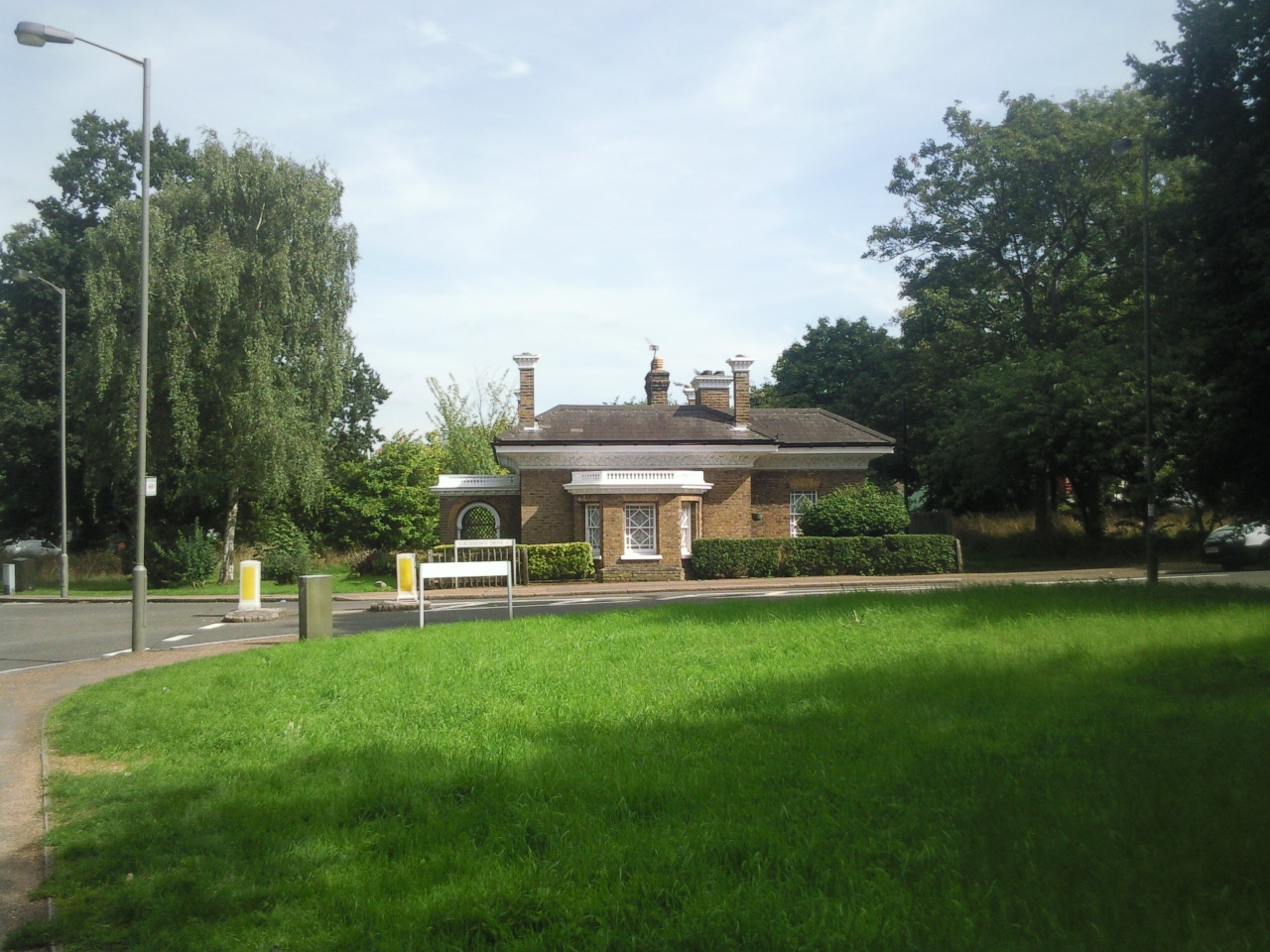
- Furzedown Lodge on Tooting Graveney Common

- Location within Greater London
- Population: 15,504 (2011 Census. Ward)
- London borough: Wandsworth
- Ceremonial county: Greater London
- Region: London
- Country: England
- Sovereign state: United Kingdom
- Post town: LONDON
- Postcode district: SW16 and SW17
- Dialling code: 020
- Police: Metropolitan
- Fire: London
- Ambulance: London
- UK Parliament: Tooting; Streatham and Croydon North
- London Assembly: Merton and Wandsworth

Furzedown is a suburb, in both the districts of Streatham (Streatham West and part of Streatham Park) and Tooting within the London Borough of Wandsworth in south west London. It is a mainly residential area close to Tooting Commons, which provide a large open space including Tooting Bec Lido.

== Education ==
Besides containing Furzedown halls of Residence, a part of the University of the Arts London, it contains Graveney Secondary School, and Goldfinch formerly Eardley School, Furzedown and Penwortham Primary Schools.

== History ==
Much of the current Furzedown ward was in the parish of Streatham and included the Streatham Park estate.

Some on the western part was in the parish of Tooting, (St Nicholas) and part of the Seely estate, comprising 80 acres (32 ha) and 100 acres (40 ha). Part of the estate adjacent to Tooting Junction Railway Station became available in 1892 and was developed as the Furzedown golf course, designed by Tom Dunn. The Seely estate was sold at the beginning of the twentieth century and the golf club moved to South Lodge, Mitcham Common in 1906. The roads in this part of Furzedown were mainly laid out between 1900 and 1930, covering the former golf course after sale of the estate. Furzedown House, dating from 1794 and enlarged with conservatory and single-storey entrance lodge in the early 1860s, was saved and converted to a teacher training college by London County Council in 1915.

In November 2017, Arthur Tingle, who was then nine years old, began a project at Penwortham School. Using Furzedown's online community network, he contacted the businesses on Moyser Road and local residents to ask about what the shops had been in the past, and people's memories of shopping in them. During 2019, local photographer Alan Weller and Martin Beaver contacted the people that Arthur had contacted – and more. Their intention is to create an updateable record of the present and enable people in the future – residents, schoolchildren, local historians, anyone – to have something to refer back to from this one year. In April 2020 they published a book of pictures and stories of Moyser Road and its shops in 2019, see www.moyserroad.furzedown.net

== Politics ==
Rosena Allin-Khan is now the MP for the area having won the by-election in June 2016 - 2016 Tooting by-election.

Sadiq Khan (who lives in Furzedown) was previously the MP for the area, from 2005 to 2016. He is now the Mayor of London.

Furzedown is covered by the Furzedown ward for elections to Wandsworth London Borough Council. From May 2016, the London Assembly member for Merton & Wandsworth is Leonie Cooper who also lives locally in Furzedown. In 2018 she was also one of the three Furzedown Councillors on Wandsworth Borough Council, together with Graham Loveland and Judi Gasser, all members of the Labour Party. In the 2022 Wandsworth election, Cooper was joined by Katrina Ffrench and Judi Gasser.

== Furzedown Community Network ==
The Furzedown Community Network (FCN), is made up of local people, who are keen to promote a sense of community and help make Furzedown a good place to live, work and play.

FCN works to improve the neighbourhood, organising the annual Furzedown Summer Festival, the highlight of which is the Big Day Out, which takes place in the Furzedown Recreation Ground, attracting a large attendance. FCN also organises a busy Winter Market in Moyser Road, plus smaller events such as quiz nights. The activities undertaken reflect the interests and energy of the group members who organise them.

== Other local organisations ==
FACE - Furzedown Annual Charity Events - organises charity fundraising events for a range of local charities.

Furzedown Low Carbon Zone - The Furzedown Low Carbon Zone is a community initiative working to reduce its dependence on fossil fuel energy, while developing local understanding of issues around sustainability and the environment.

Sprout Arts - a self funding community arts space, bringing art and crafts to life, in Furzedown.

Furzedown Foodbank - part of Wandsworth Foodbank, The Trussell Trust

Furzedown Youth Centre (FYC) - a safe place for young people in Furzedown.

Furzedown Community Theatre - see Facebook - a group of local people, of all ages, which produces an annual show, usually a pantomime, performed locally
