= London Steiner School =

Location
- 9 Weir Road; London, SW12 0LT; England; 51°26′45″N 0°08′36″W

Information
- Type: Private school
- Established: 1983
- Closed: 2023
- Department for Education URN: 101073 Tables
- Gender: Coeducational
- Age: 3 to 14
- Website: http://www.londonsteinerschool.org

London Steiner School (formerly Waldorf School of South West London) was a Steiner Education-based independent school located at 9 Weir Road in Balham, the London Borough of Lambeth, England.

== History ==
The Waldorf School of South West London opened in September 1983, with one student and one teacher. For nearly 40 years, the school provided Steiner Waldorf education in South London.

The school was situated on Tooting Common, on public land rented from Wandsworth Council until 2010. The original wooden buildings burned to the ground in 2004 (suspected arson) and the school relocated temporarily to a church hall in Streatham while a new building was erected on the original site. Four years after the school moved into the new building, the council decided not to renew the lease, and the school looked for new permanent premises.

The school moved temporarily back into the Church Hall in Streatham for a further two years, before the present site of 9 Weir Road in Balham was found.

The school then changed its name to London Steiner School.

The London Steiner School provided Waldorf Steiner education for children aged 3 to 14 (early years/kindergarten to Class 8). When grade 8 was completed, students moved on to their next school, which could be any secondary school in the country, Steiner or otherwise. The school also provided indoor and outdoor Parent and Child Groups (0–3 years old).

The school was rated as 'Inadequate' by Ofsted in November 2018. A further inspection in November 2021 rated the school as 'Requires Improvement'. The school then closed in April 2023.

== See also ==
- Curriculum of the Waldorf schools
