= Thraliana =

Book by Hester Thrale

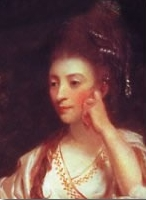
Hester Lynch Thrale, author of the Thraliana

The Thraliana was a diary kept by Hester Thrale and is part of the genre known as table talk. Although the work began as Thrale's diary focused on her experience with her family, it slowly changed focus to emphasise various anecdotes and stories about the life of Samuel Johnson. The work was used as a basis for Thrale's Anecdotes of the Late Samuel Johnson, but the Thraliana remained unpublished until 1942. The anecdotes contained within the work were popular with Thrale's contemporaries but seen as vulgar. Among 20th-century readers, the work was popular, and many literary critics believe that the work is a valuable contribution to the genre and for providing information about Johnson's and her own life.

== Background ==
Hester Thrale, when still Hester Lynch Salusbury, spent her youth writing letters and keeping journals. Her talents at writing won her the respect of her uncles, Sir Robert Cotton and Sir Thomas Salusbury, who later appointed her their heir. When Thrale was older, she became close to Johnson. It was natural to her to keep a detailed collection of anecdotes and stories of their time together, as of everything she experienced. The two initially bonded after Thrale gave birth to her first child, Queeney, in 1766.

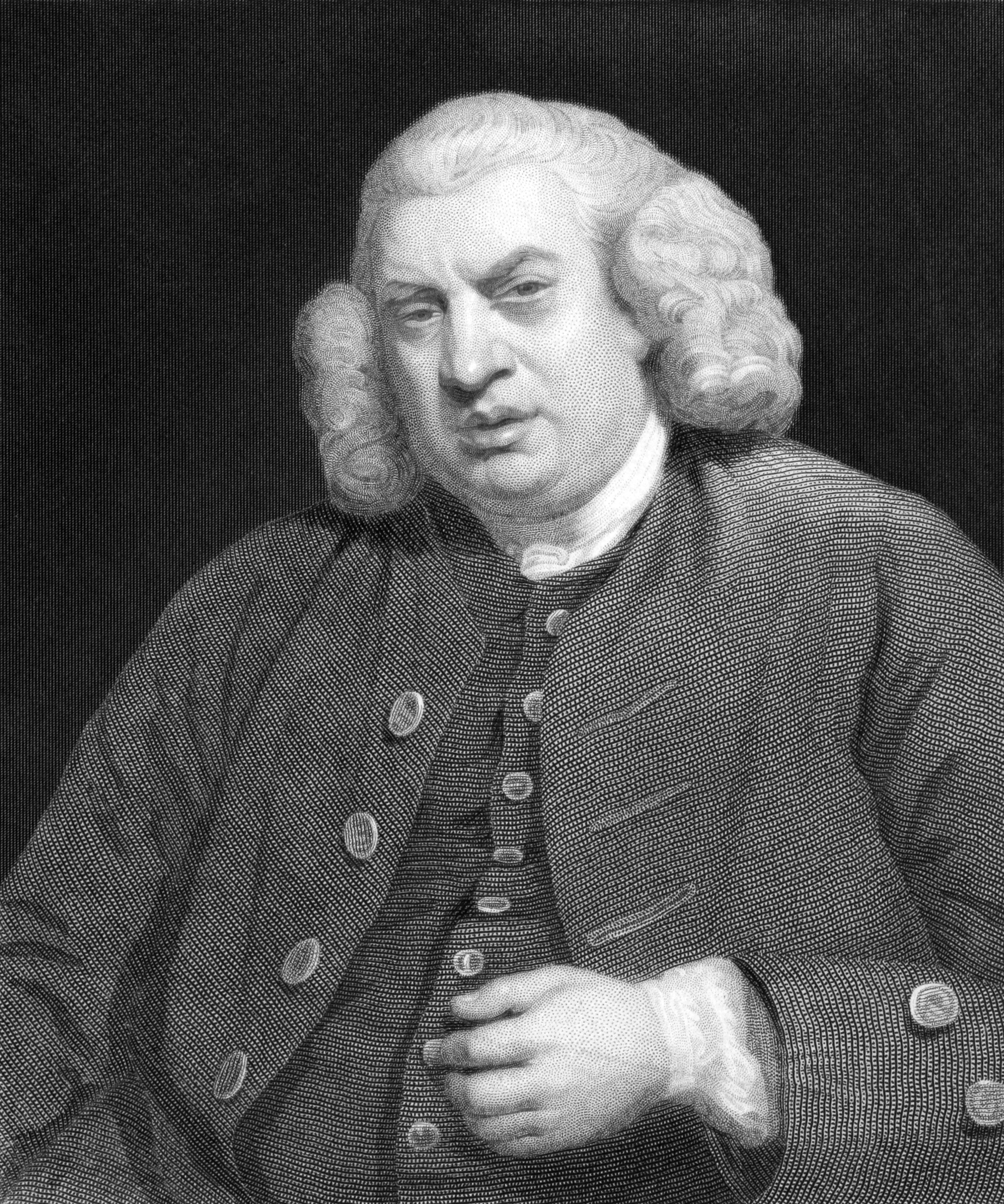
Samuel Johnson

However, there were problems between Thrale and Johnson, along with "his defenders" during his life and in criticism since then, over their "gradual estrangement" from each other after the death of her husband. These problems were then heightened by her marriage to Gabriel Piozzi. After Johnson's death, Thrale felt isolated because she believed that Johnson's previous friends along with the public as a whole did not accept her, and some went so far as to claim she abandoned Johnson in his final moments. In particular, James Boswell, who resented Thrale and felt himself as her literary competitor, began to exploit the falling out between Thrale and Johnson's friends in order to promote his Life of Samuel Johnson.

After the birth of Queeney, Thrale began to document the various moments in her daughter's life in a "baby book" called The Children's Book. The work eventually expanded to include documentation of the whole family and was retitled the Family Book. To encourage his wife's writing her husband Henry Thrale gave her six blank diary books, with the title Thraliana on the cover, in 1776. The work was intended as an Ana, which she admits her fascination with in the Thraliana: "I am grown quite mad after these French Anas; Anecdote is in itself so seducing". After searching for English models for writing her Ana, she settled on used John Selden's Table Talk, William Camden's Remains, and Joseph Spence's Anecdotes as her guides. In May 1778, she was given by Johnson a manuscript of Spence's Anecdotes, but her first years of the Ana were written without an exact model.

Before the Thraliana, Thrale kept two sets of anecdotes: the first was devoted to Samuel Johnson and the other for miscellaneous events. She relied on these, along with her memory, to write the early portions of her work. Boswell, when trying to find information for his own work, wrote: "Mr. Thrale told me, I am not sure what day, that there is a Book of Johnsoniana kept in their Family, in which all Mr. Johnson's sayings and all that they can collect about him is put down ... I must try to get this Thralian Miscellany, to assist me in writing Mr. Johnson's Life, if Mrs. Thrale does not intend to do it herself." After Johnson's death, Thrale used the Thraliana to create the Anecdotes of the Late Samuel Johnson (1786). The manuscript passed through many hands and was owned by A. Edward Newton until his death in autumn 1940. The Thraliana was eventually published in 1942, and it was produced by the Clarendon Press in England while its editor, Katharine Balderston, was prohibited from travelling across the ocean from Wellesley College because of World War II.

== Ana ==
Thrale explains that her book is not for "diary-keeping in the strict sense" when she writes on the first page: "It is many Years since Doctor Samuel Johnson advised me to get a little Book, and write in it all the little Anecdotes which might come to my Knowledge, all the Observations I might make or hear; all the Verses never likely to be published, and in fine ev'ry thing which struck me at the Time. Mr Thrale has now treated me with a Repository, - and provided it with the pompous Title of Thraliana; I must endeavour to fill it with Nonsense new and old." These encouraging remarks from Johnson set the theme of the work as it became a new "Johnsoniana" collection. In particular, she transferred her previous notes and documentations about Johnson's life into the collection.

In a 6 September 1777 letter, Johnson told Thrale to be "punctual in annexing the dates. Chronology you know is the eye of history". However, the system of Ana allowed Thrale to group items by theme instead of by topics, like "Odd medical Stories", to organize anecdotes, quotations, and stories. When Henry Thrale died while Thrale was writing Volume Three, the work became a diary for Thrale to discuss her thoughts and feelings after her loss. This volume soon began to describe Thrale's feelings for Gabriel Piozzi. Throughout the Thraliana, Thrale examines how others view her, which reveals her anxieties that she had about how she was perceived. This is especially true when she writes: "Life has been to me nothing but a perpetual Canvass carried on in all parts of the World - not to make Friends neither - for I have certainly found very few - but to keep off Enemies". Thrale initially did not want to write in the sixth volume of the Thraliana, but did so because "Johnson said that Pleasure might one day be made from such Nonsense, so I'll e'en finish this last Volume of Anecdote & store up no more Stuff". However she did not stop journal writing after she finished but continued to write for the remainder of her life.

== Critical response ==
Thrale's anecdotes were popular when they were first published in various works, but many readers initially thought that her "relaxed and natural style" was vulgar. However, Martine Brownley points out that this style helped win over 20th century readers even though the work suffered from "unevenness". Katherine Balderston regards the work as "what was almost, if not quite, the first English ana". James Clifford declared that "there is much valuable evidence about the great man," Samuel Johnson, within the Thraliana. He also stated that the work, along with her Anecdotes of the Late Samuel Johnson, "established her reputation as a bluestocking writer of the late eighteenth century. Edward Bloom et al. claim that the Thraliana, as with her letters, lays "bare a woman's psychology".
