= Streatham Park =

Coordinates: 51.428°N 0.142°W

- Location within Greater London
- London borough: Wandsworth
- Ceremonial county: Greater London
- Region: London
- Country: England
- Sovereign state: United Kingdom
- Post town: LONDON
- Postcode district: SW16
- Dialling code: 020
- Police: Metropolitan
- Fire: London
- Ambulance: London
- UK Parliament: Tooting
- London Assembly: Merton and Wandsworth

Streatham Park is an area of suburban South London that comprises the eastern part of Furzedown ward in the London Borough of Wandsworth, formerly in the historic parish of Streatham. It is bounded by Tooting Bec Common to the north, Thrale Road and West Road to the west and the London to Brighton railway to the east.

The area takes its name from a Georgian country mansion built by the brewer Ralph Thrale. Streatham Park later passed to Ralph's son Henry Thrale, who with his wife, Hester Thrale, entertained many of the leading literary and artistic characters of the day, most notably the lexicographer Samuel Johnson, who was fond of a summer house in the grounds.

== Residents ==
Former residents and guests of Streatham Park, or "Streathamites", include many notable 18th-century people: Samuel Johnson, David Garrick, Arthur Murphy, Joshua Reynolds, William Seward, James Boswell, Oliver Goldsmith, Giuseppe Marc'Antonio Baretti, Edmund Burke, Edwin Sandys, William Henry Lyttelton, Sir Robert Chambers, Charles Burney and Frances Burney, along with James and Hester Thrale. The dining room contained 12 portraits of Henry's guests painted by Reynolds. These pictures were wittily labelled by Frances Burney as the Streatham Worthies.

Streatham Park was later leased to the prime minister Lord Shelburne, and was the venue of the negotiated peace with France in 1783. The Streatham Park mansion was demolished in 1863 and the estate and adjacent fields were laid out for suburban development.

Although much of the area was destroyed by bombing in World War II and redeveloped by the Metropolitan Borough of Wandsworth as council housing in the 1950s, both the avenues of trees of the Georgian estate and much of the Victorian era tree planting survive, and the area is now a conservation area.

The remaining pre-war buildings include Dixcote (8 North Drive), a rare urban example of a house by the Arts and Crafts architect Charles Voysey. A plaque erected by the Streatham Society on one of the small modern houses marks the site of the Streatham Park mansion.
