= Henry Thrale =

18th-century English politician

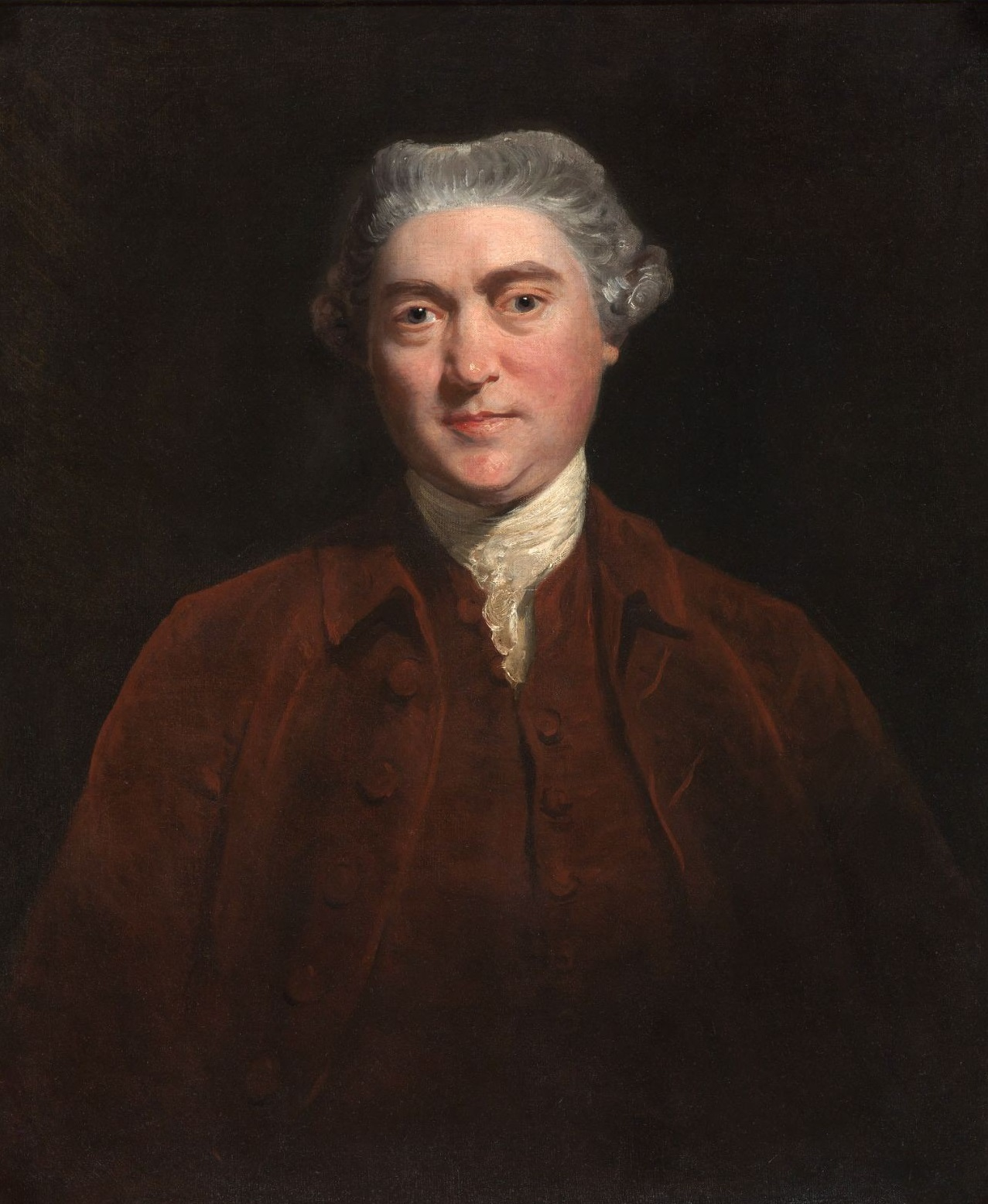
- Henry Thrale by Sir Joshua Reynolds, *2003JM-3, Houghton Library, Harvard University
- Born: 1724; Harrow Corner, Southwark
- Died: 4 April 1781 (aged 56–57); London
- Occupation: English politician

Henry Thrale (1724/1730?–4 April 1781) was a British politician who sat in the House of Commons from 1765 to 1780. He was a close friend of Samuel Johnson. Like his father, he was the proprietor of the large London brewery H. Thrale & Co.

Born at the Alehouse in Harrow Corner, Southwark, he was the son of the rich brewer Ralph Thrale (1698–1758) and Mary Thrale. He married Hester Lynch Salusbury on 11 October 1763; they had 12 children, and she outlived him. He was MP for Southwark 23 December 1765 – September 1780, an Alderman, and Sheriff of the City of London: a respected, religious man who was a good hunter and sportsman with a taste for gambling.

== Education ==
Thrale was educated at Eton College and University College, Oxford, where he matriculated on 4 June 1744. He travelled in Europe with Lord William Henry Lyttleton Westcote (1724–1808).

== Friendship with Samuel Johnson ==
Johnson first met the Thrales on the 9 or 10 January 1765, and immediately became almost a part of their family. There was much good literary company. When Fanny Burney was admitted to the circle, Samuel Crisp wrote "Where will you find such another set? Oh, Fanny, set this down as the happiest period of your life." Johnson mostly lived with the Thrales at his country house Streatham Park or brewery home for the next 15 years until Henry's death in 1781.

== Parliamentary and business career ==
On 23 December 1765, Henry Thrale was elected to Parliament. He continued to represent Southwark until his election defeat in 1780.

Thrale inherited the Anchor Brewery, Southwark from his father. In 1772 a scheme for brewing beer without malt or hops put the brewery in debt by £130,000 (£13 million today). This almost bankrupted Henry Thrale. Hester Thrale raised money from her mother and other friends and he cleared the debt in nine years.

== Travels ==
In 1774 Samuel Johnson went with the Thrales on a tour of Wales, during which time they visited Hester's cousin, Sir Robert Cotton at Lleweni Hall in Denbighshire.

In September 1775 Hester, Henry and their eldest child Queeney, together with Samuel Johnson and Giuseppe Baretti, went to Paris.

On 19 October 1775 the party was admitted to the Court of King Louis XVI and Queen Marie Antoinette at Fontainebleau, and enjoyed dinner and an evening at the theatre with them.

== Family life ==
Henry and Hester Thrale had twelve children of whom only four daughters survived to adulthood:

- Hester Maria (Queeney) (17 September 1764 – 31 March 1857)
- Frances (27 September 1765 – 6 October 1765)
- Henry Salusbury (15 February 1766 – 23 March 1776)
- Anna Maria (1 April 1768 – 21 March 1770)
- Lucy Elizabeth (22 June 1769 – 22 November 1773)
- Susannah Arabella (23 May 1770 – 5 November 1858)
- Sophia (23 July 1771 – 8 November 1824)
- Penelope (15 September 1772 – 15 September 1772)
- Ralph (8 November 1773 – 13 July 1775)
- Frances Anna (4 May 1775 – 9 December 1775)
- Cecelia Margaretta (8 February 1777 – 1 May 1857)
- Henrietta Sophia (21 June 1778 – 25 April 1783)

Henry and Hester's marriage has misleadingly been described as loveless. While there was no great passion, they loved and respected each other. On their wedding anniversary in 1787 Hester wrote:

Why do the people say I never loved my first husband? -tis a very unjust conjecture. This day on which 24 years ago I was married to him never returns without bringing with it many a tender Remembrance: though 'twas on that Evening when we retired together that I was first alone with Mr. Thrale for five minutes in my whole life. Ours was a match of mere Prudence; and common good Liking, without the smallest Pretensions to passion on either Side: I knew no more of him than any other Gentleman who came to the House, nor did he ever profess other Attachment to me, than such as Esteem of my Character, & Convenience from my Fortune produced. I really had never past five whole Minutes Tête a Tête with him in my life till the Evening of our Wedding Day, -& he himself has said so a Thousand Times. yet God who gave us to each other, knows I did love him dearly; & what honour I can ever do to his Memory shall be done, for he was very generous to me.

— Hester Thrale, Thraliana 1787

The speculation that Hester did not love her husband may have originated from the fact that she was of significantly higher social status than Thrale, and often eclipsed him at social events due to her family's pedigree. This, according to all reports, infuriated Thrale at certain times and may have led to an awkward relationship between the two during the public events. Fanny Burney records that Hester's mind was 'cruelly disordered' with grief at Henry's death.

== Personality ==
In June 1777 his wife wrote in Thraliana ...

Mr Thrale's Person is manly, his Countenance agreeable, his Eyes steady and of the deepest Blue: his Look neither soft nor severe, neither sprightly nor gloomy, but thoughtful and Intelligent: his Address is neither caressive nor repulsive, but unaffectedly civil and decorous; and his Manner more completely free from every kind of Trick or Particularity than I ever saw any person's – he is a Man wholly as I think out of the Power of Mimickry. He loves Money & is diligent to obtain it; but he loves Liberality too, & is willing enough both to give generously & spend fashionably. His Passions either are not strong, or else he keeps them under such Command that they seldom disturb his Tranquillity or his Friends, & it must I think be something more than common which can affect him strongly either with Hope, Fear Anger Love or Joy. His regard for his Father's Memory is remarkably great, and he has been a most exemplary Brother; though when the house of his favourite Sister was on Fire, & we were alarmed with the Account of it in the Night, I well remember that he never rose, but bidding the Servant who called us, go to her Assistance; quietly turned about & slept to his usual hour. I must give another Trait of his Tranquillity on a different Occasion; he had built great Casks holding 1000 Hogsheads each, & was much pleased with their Profit & Appearance – One Day however he came down to Streatham as usual to dinner & after hearing & talking of a hundred trifles-but I forgot says he to tell you how one of my great Casks is burst & all the Beer run out. Mr Thrale's Sobriety, & the Decency of his Conversation being wholly free from all Oaths Ribaldry and Profaneness make him a Man exceedingly comfortable to live with, while the easiness of his Temper and slowness to take Offence add greatly to his Value as a domestic Man: Yet I think his Servants do not much love him, and I am not sure that his Children feel much Affection for him: low People almost all indeed agree to abhorr him, as he has none of that officious & cordial Manner which is universally required by them – nor any Skill to dissemble his dislike of their Coarseness – with Regard to his Wife, tho' little tender of her Person, he is very partial to her Understanding, – but he is obliging to nobody; & confers a Favour less pleasingly than many a Man refuses to confer one. This appears to me to be as just a Character as can be given of the Man with whom I have now lived thirteen Years, and tho' he is extremely reserved and uncommunicative, yet one must know something of him after so long Acquaintance. Johnson has a very great Degree of Kindness & Esteem for him, & says if he would talk more, his Manner would be very completely that of a perfect Gentleman.

== Illness and death ==
On 1 April 1777 Henry's death was falsely reported in the newspapers, and threw James Boswell into "a state of very uneasy uncertainty".

On 8 or 11 June 1779, Thrale went to the house of his sister – Mrs Susannah Nesbitt – to read the will of her husband Arnold Nesbitt, MP for Cricklade. During the meal, Henry had his first stroke. Read more >> The second stroke came on 19 or 21 February 1780; on 10 September he had a third, while canvassing constituents during the 1780 general election campaign.

The strokes were largely caused by Henry's voracious appetite for large indulgent meals, accompanied by large quantities of ale.

Henry Thrale died in London at 5 a.m. 4 April 1781, with his wife and Johnson by his side. He was buried in the crypt of St. Leonards Church, Streatham. Henry's epitaph was written by Samuel Johnson.

== Obituaries ==
On Wednesday 11, was buried my dear Friend Thrale who died on Wednesday 4, and with him were buried many of my hopes and pleasures. I felt almost the flutter of his pulse, and looked for the last time upon a face that for fifteen years had never been turned upon me but with respect and benignity.

— Samuel Johnson

He also wrote of Thrale:

I am not without my part of the calamity. No death since that of my wife has ever oppressed me like this. My part of the loss hangs upon me. I have lost a friend of boundless kindness at an age when it is very unlikely that I should find another. One great abatement of all miseries was the attention of Mr. Thrale, which from our first acquaintance was never intermitted. I know no man who is more master of his wife and family than Thrale. If he but holds up a finger, he is obeyed.

— Samuel Johnson

A more ingenuous frame of mind no man possessed. His education at Oxford gave him the habits of a gentleman; his amiable temper recommended his conversation, and the goodness of his heart made him a sincere friend.

— Arthur Murphy

He was a most respectable character; intelligent, modest, communicative and friendly.

— James Beattie

In his Life of Johnson, James Boswell mentions Henry's worthy principles, sound scholarship, business acumen, general intelligence and polished manners. He also added his impressive looks, dignified bearing and generosity towards his wife in his allowance to her for entertaining those guests of her own choosing.

== Will ==
The executors of Henry Thrale's will were Samuel Johnson, Henry Smith, Joseph Crutchley, John Cator and Hester Thrale. The Anchor Brewhouse was quickly sold to David Barclay, who took Thrale's old manager, John Perkins (1730–1812), into partnership. They became Barclay, Perkins and Company. The sale figure was £135,000 (£13,500,000 or $22,500,000 today).

This was all left in trust for Thrale's five daughters who are said to have been left £20,000 each (£2,000,000 today). From other assets his wife was left the interest from £50,000 for life and the contents of Streatham Park (including all Sir Joshua Reynolds paintings) for life.

Samuel Johnson famously said, "We are not here to sell a parcel of boilers and vats, but the potentiality of growing rich beyond the dreams of avarice."

Parliament of Great Britain
Preceded by Alexander Hume; Joseph Maybey	Member of Parliament for Southwark; 1765 – 1780; With: Sir Joseph Mawbey, Bt to 1774; Nathaniel Polhill from 1774	Succeeded by Sir Richard Hotham; Nathaniel Polhill
