= Giuseppe Marc'Antonio Baretti =

Italian-born English literary critic and author

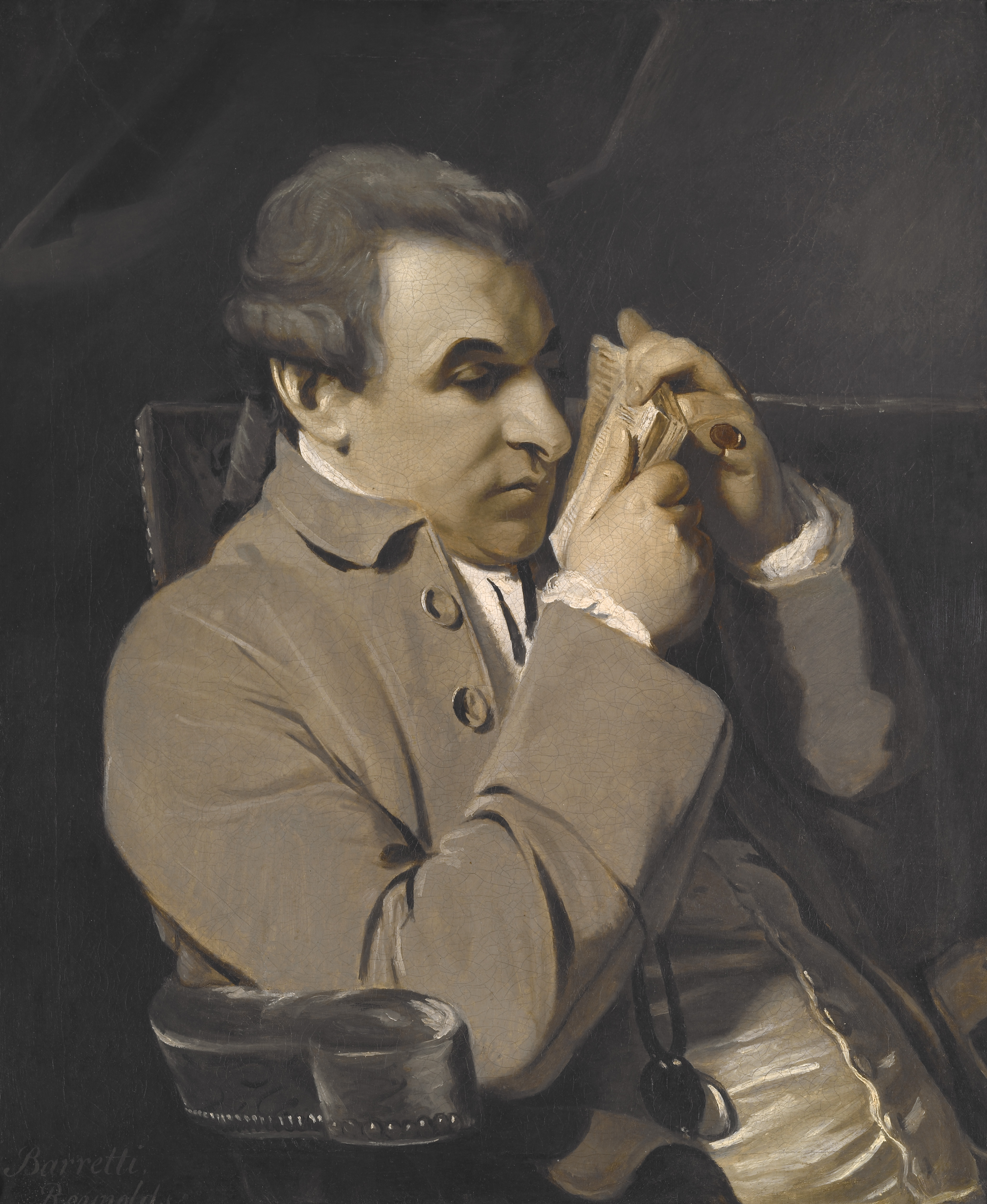
- Joshua Reynolds, Portrait of Joseph Baretti, Indianapolis Museum of Art
- Born: 24 April 1719; Turin, Duchy of Savoy
- Died: 5 May 1789; London, Great Britain
- Occupations: Lexicographer, poet, playwright, translator, literary critic, writer

Giuseppe Marc'Antonio Baretti (24 April 1719, Turin, Piedmont – 5 May 1789, London) was an Italian literary critic, poet, writer, translator, linguist and author of two influential language-translation dictionaries. During his years in England he was often known as Joseph Baretti. Baretti's life was marked by controversies, to the point that he had to leave Italy, for England, where he remained for the rest of his life.

== Biography ==
Baretti was intended by his father for the profession of law, but at the age of sixteen fled from Turin and went to Guastalla, where he was for some time employed in a mercantile house. He devoted himself to the study of literature and criticism, in which he became an expert, though his writings were so controversial that he had to leave Italy. For many years he led a wandering life, supporting himself chiefly by his writings.

In 1737, he enrolled the University of Turin, where he attended the lectures given at by Girolamo Tagliazucchi. The following year, Baretti moved to Venice, where he made the acquaintance of the young Gasparo Gozzi. In 1740 he moved to Milan. Here he became a member of the prominent Accademia dei Trasformati and made the acquaintance of Pietro Verri and Giuseppe Parini. While in Milan he studied Latin and translated into Italian Ovid's Remedia Amoris and Amores, which he published more than ten years later, in 1752 and 1754.

in January 1751, Baretti left Italy for a nine-year stay in London, during which he taught Italian. One of his pupils was Charlotte Lennox, who introduced him to British intellectual circles. In this period Baretti made friends with several prominent English intellectuals, including Henry Fielding, Sir Joshua Reynolds (who later painted Baretti's portrait), David Garrick, and Samuel Johnson, whom Baretti very much admired. Among works connected with his teaching, a successful Dictionary of the English and Italian languages (1760) enabled him to return to Italy, through Portugal, Spain, and France. The first two volumes of his lively, outspoken account of the journey appeared as Lettere familiari ai suoi tre fratelli in 1762 and 1763, but publication of the last two volumes was forbidden by Venetian censorship. In 1763–4 he published in Venice the literary journal La Frusta letteraria, through which he aimed to modernize Italian literature with stinging criticism of current frivolous or antiquated books.

When La Frusta too was suppressed in January 1765, Baretti returned to England, where he was welcomed back by his old friends, especially Samuel Johnson, with whom he had kept up a correspondence during his stay in Italy. Johnson introduced him to Oliver Goldsmith, James Boswell, and Edmund Burke. In 1773, Baretti became the Italian language tutor of Hetty, one of the daughters of Hester Thrale. For his pupil he wrote in 1775 a delightful Easy Phraseology for the Use of Young Ladies, who Intend to Learn … Italian. He became a frequent visitor at the home of Hester Thrale, and his name occurs repeatedly in Boswell's Life.

To answer Samuel Sharp's slanderous Letters from Italy, he published An Account of the Manners and Customs of Italy, with Observations on the Mistakes of Some Travellers, with Regard to That Country (1768). The book was so popular that a second edition was published in 1769. In this and other works Baretti stimulated interest in and understanding of Italian literature and culture.

In 1769 Baretti was tried for murder after inflicting a mortal wound with his fruit knife on a man who had assaulted him on the street. Many of his British friends gave evidence in his favour at the trial and testified to Baretti's good character and quiet lifestyle. Hon. Mr. Beauclerck described him as a gentleman of letters and a studious man. Sir Joshua Reynolds said he was a man with great humanity and "very active in endeavouring his friends", he outlined his sober disposition, saying that he never drank more than three glasses with him and he added: "I never heard of his being in passions or quarrelling". Doctor Johnson described him as very diligent and peaceable. Edmund Burke claimed he was an ingenious man, "a man of remarkable humanity; a thorough good-natured man", whereas David Garrick said of him he was a man of great probity and morals.

The trial eventually resulted in Baretti's acquittal on the grounds of self-defence. Baretti was extremely satisfied with the outcome of the trial, in particular with the kind demonstration of affection he received from his friends, so much that he felt himself even more connected with England than before, a country which had given him justice and real friendship. He later revealed to his friend Lord Charlemont that "those I had about me did their part so well that they have made me an Englishman forever".

That same year he was appointed Secretary to the Royal Academy of Arts. He published a translation of the entire Lettere familiari as A Journey from London to Genoa, through England, Portugal, Spain, and France (1770), and an edition of Niccolò Machiavelli's works, with an important Preface (1772). His most mature works were Discours sur Shakespeare et sur Monsieur de Voltaire (1777), in which, following Johnson's ideas, he brilliantly defended the free inventions and powerful genius of Shakespeare against Voltaire's narrow-minded criticism, and Scelta di lettere familiari fatta per uso degli studiosi di lingua italiana (1779) – letters attributed to fictitious authors, which beyond any didactic purpose are a kind of intellectual autobiography, showing the conversion of an Italian conservative to more liberal, modern English ideas.

Baretti's Strictures on Signora Piozzi's Publication of Doctor Johnson's Letters (1788) make him the most probable author of The Sentimental Mother, an anonymous comedy satirizing Thrale Piozzi, published just after his death.

Baretti died in London in May, 1789. He was buried in Marylebone Chapel with a monument by Thomas Banks.

== Works ==
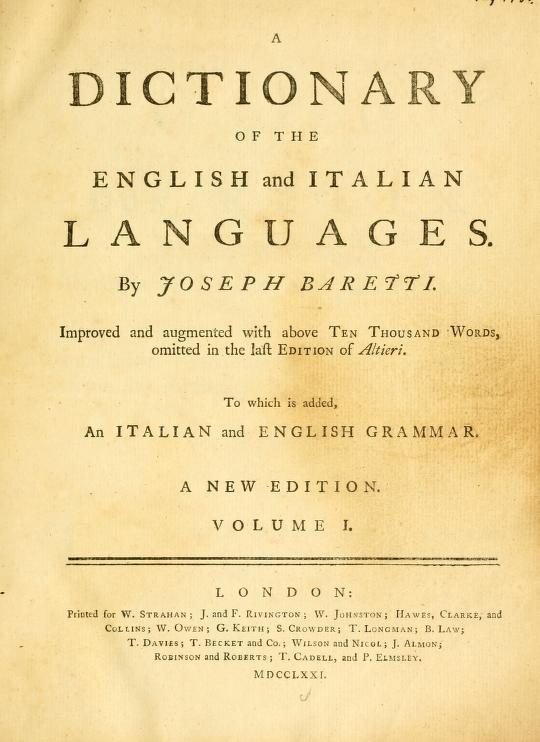
Title page of Baretti's Dictionary of the English and Italian languages

Baretti's first notable work was the Italian Library (1757), a useful catalogue of the lives and works of several Italian authors. The Lettere famigliari, giving an account of his travels through England, Portugal, Spain, and France during the years 1761–1765, were well received, and when afterwards published in English (4 vols., 1770), were highly commended by Johnson.

Baretti was an enemy of the English Hispanist John Bowle, and published a scathing and personal attack on him: Tolondron. Speeches to John Bowle about his edition of Don Quixote, together with some account of Spanish literature.

While in Italy on his travels Baretti started a journal of literary criticism, titled Frusta letteraria (Literary Scourge). The publication met with considerable difficulties and was soon discontinued. His many other works include a Dictionary and Grammar of the Italian Language, a similar Dictionary of the Spanish Language, and dissertations on Shakespeare and Voltaire. His collected works were published at Milan in 1838.

Baretti's Dictionary of Italian Language was immensely successful and became the standard reference work of its kind. it went through numerous reprints and revisions. His works helped to promote a renewed interest in Italian language and literature in Britain and encouraged the study of English authors in his native country.

The words of the recantation attributed to Galileo, "eppur si muove" (meaning "nevertheless it moves"), were first set down by Baretti in his Italian Library. This record was published some 125 years after Galileo is purported to have made the statement sotto voce (under his breath).
