= Hester Thrale =

Welsh writer and socialite (1740/1741–1821)

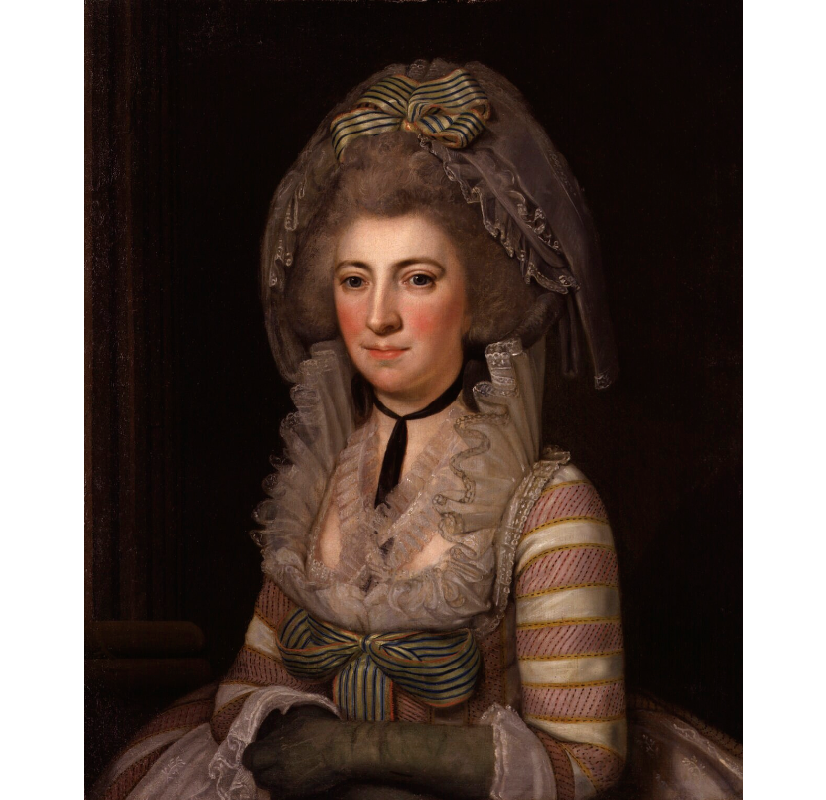
- Thrale in 1786
- Born: Hester Lynch Salusbury; 27 January 1741; Caernarvonshire, Wales
- Died: 2 May 1821 (aged 80); Clifton, Bristol
- Other names: Hester Salusbury; Hester Piozzi
- Spouses: Henry Thrale (m. 1763; died 1781) Gabriel Mario Piozzi (m. 1784; died 1809)

Hester Lynch Thrale Piozzi (née Salusbury; 27 January 1741 or 16 January 1740 – 2 May 1821) (Note: Contemporary records, which used the Julian calendar and the Annunciation Style of enumerating years, recorded her birth as 16 January 1740. The provisions of the British Calendar (New Style) Act 1750, implemented in 1752, altered the official British dating method to the Gregorian calendar with the start of the year on 1 January (it had been 25 March). These changes resulted in dates being moved forward 11 days, and for those between 1 January and 25 March, an advance of one year. For further explanation, see: Old Style and New Style dates.) was a Welsh writer and socialite whose diaries, letters and other works made her an important source of information on Samuel Johnson and 18th-century British life. A member of the prominent Salusbury family of Anglo-Welsh landowners, she first married a wealthy English brewer, Henry Thrale, with whom she had 12 children, and then a musician, Gabriel Mario Piozzi. Her Anecdotes of the Late Samuel Johnson (1786) and her diary Thraliana, published posthumously in 1942, are the main works for which she is remembered. She also wrote a popular history book, a travel book, and a dictionary, and she was an innovator in the art of annotation. She has been seen as a protofeminist.

== Early years ==
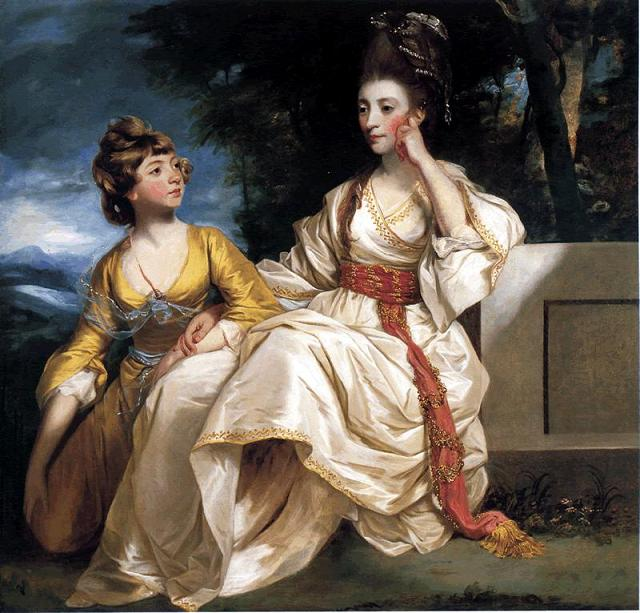
Sir Joshua Reynolds, Portrait of Hester Thrale and her daughter Hester (c. 1777), Beaverbrook Art Gallery, New Brunswick, Canada

Hester Lynch Salusbury was born at Bodvel Hall, Caernarvonshire, Wales, the only daughter of Hester Lynch Cotton and Sir John Salusbury. As a member of the powerful Salusbury family, she belonged to one of the most illustrious Welsh land-owning dynasties of the Georgian era. Through her father's line, she was a direct descendant of Katheryn of Berain. Hester enjoyed the devoted attention of her uncles and was educated to a high level for a young woman. She would later write that "they had taught me to read and speak and think and translate from the French, till I was half a prodigy."

== Career ==
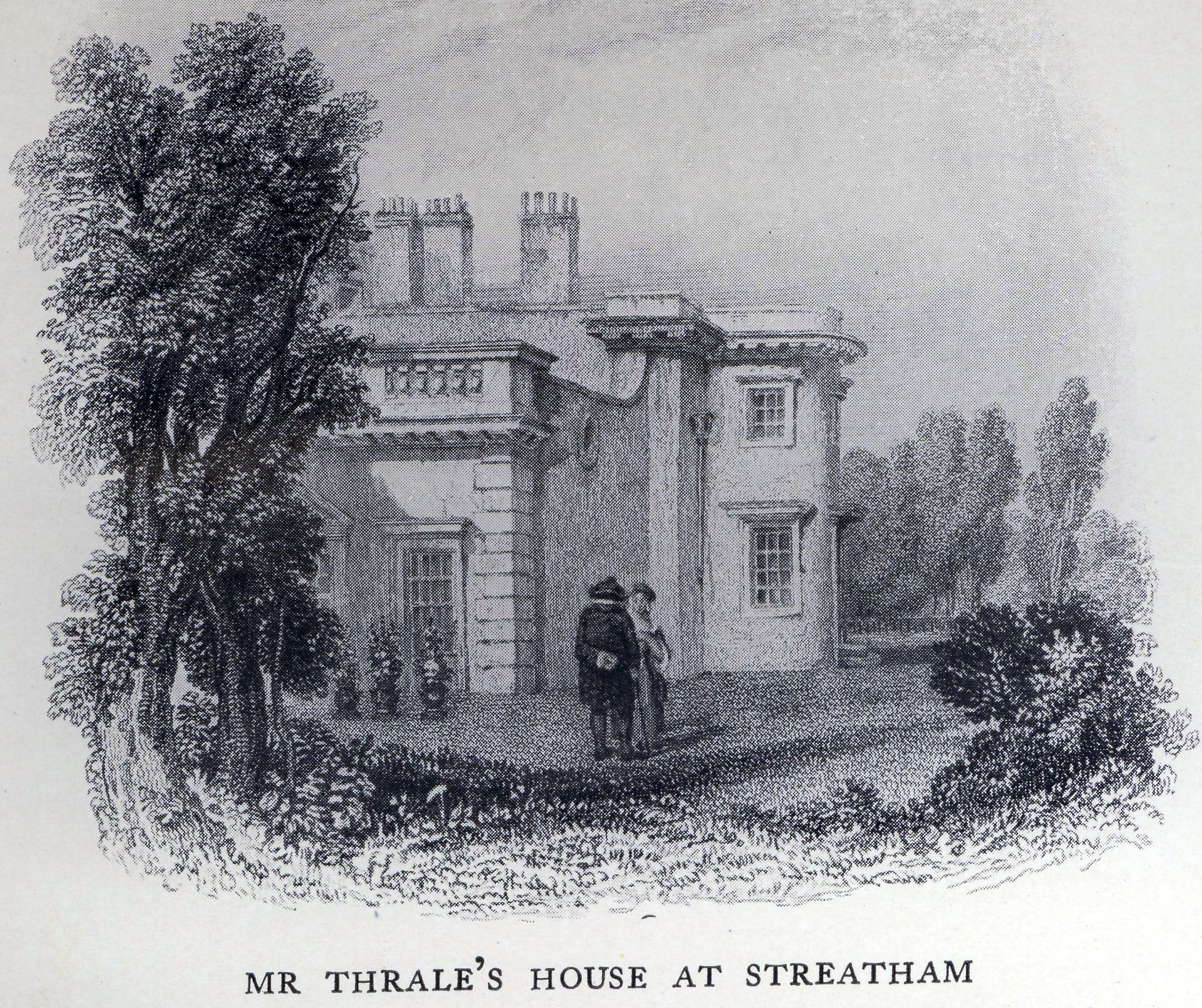
Streatham Park

=== First marriage ===
After her father had gone bankrupt in an attempt to invest in Halifax, Nova Scotia, Hester married the rich brewer Henry Thrale on 11 October 1763, at St Anne's Chapel, Soho, London. They had twelve children, of whom only four survived to adulthood, and lived at Streatham Park. However, the marriage was often strained: her husband frequently felt slighted by members of the court and may well have married to improve his social status. The Thrales' eldest daughter, Hester, became a viscountess as the wife of George Elphinstone, 1st Viscount Keith.

After her marriage, Thrale was free to associate with whom she pleased. Due to her husband's financial status, she was able to enter London society, as a result of which she met Samuel Johnson, James Boswell, Bishop Thomas Percy, Oliver Goldsmith, and other literary figures, including the young Frances Burney, whom she took with her to Gay Street, Bath.

In July 1774 Johnson visited Wales in Thrale's company, during which time they visited Hester's uncle Sir Lynch Cotton at Combermere in Denbighshire. Frances, the wife of Sir Lynch's son Robert, "found Johnson, despite his rudeness, at times delightful, having a manner peculiar to himself in relating anecdotes that could not fail to attract old and young. Her impression was that Thrale was very vexatious in wishing to engross all his attention, which annoyed him much."

Johnson wrote two verses for Thrale in 1775, the first to celebrate her 35th birthday, and another in Latin to honour her.

Frances Burney, in her diary, describes the conversations at several of Thrale's soirées, including one in 1779 about a young woman named Sophy Streatfeild (1755–1835), a daughter of Henry Streatfeild, who was a favourite of Johnson and Mr Thrale, rather to the chagrin of Hester, who commented that Sophy "had a power of captivation that was irresistible ... her beauty joined to her softness, her caressing manners, her tearful eyes, and alluring looks, would insinuate her into the heart of any man she thought worth attacking." The touch of jealousy here is further revealed in Thrale's remarking (after another of her male guests had professed devotion to Miss Streatfeild and the desire to "soothe" her): "I would ensure her power of crying herself into any of your hearts she pleased. I made her cry to Miss Burney, to show how beautiful she looked in tears" and (on being rebuked about this) "Oh but she liked it ... Miss Burney would have run away but she came forward on purpose to show herself. Sophy Streatfeild is never happier than when tears trickle down from her fine eyes in company."

The Thrales were in Bath in 1780 at the time of the Gordon Riots, when a Roman Catholic chapel was set on fire, although the greater worry for them was whether Thrale's brewery in Southwark would escape being ransacked, which it narrowly did.

Burney records Thrale's distress on losing her husband (4 April 1781), referring to her as "sweet Mrs. Thrale" and sympathising with the "agitation" she was under in having to sell the brewery and wind up his affairs. Burney was there to congratulate and cheer Thrale when the business was concluded.

At this time, 1781, Thrale was socialising with Whig members of parliament such as William Smith, the abolitionist, Benjamin Vaughan and writers, including Helen Maria Williams and Anna Laetitia Barbauld at Southampton Row in Bloomsbury, London.

=== Second marriage ===
During the ensuing years, Thrale fell in love with Gabriel Mario Piozzi, an Italian music teacher who had taught the Thrales' children, and married him on 25 July 1784. She complained: "I see the English newspapers are full of gross Insolence towards me", with one commenting how Thrale could not have imagined "his wife's disgrace, by eventually raising an obscure and penniless Fiddler into sudden Wealth." This caused a rift with Johnson, which was only perfunctorily mended shortly before his death. The levelling marriage also earned her the disapproval of Burney (who would herself marry in 1793 the impoverished, Catholic émigré Alexandre D'Arblay) and her cousins the Cottons. Thrale and Piozzi subsequently left England to travel in Europe for three years, especially in Italy and often following traditional routes of the Grand Tour.

Thrale retired to Brynbella, a newly built country house on her Bach y Graig estate in the Vale of Clwyd, near Tremeirchion in north Wales in 1795. She and her husband eventually adopted his nephew, John Salusbury Piozzi Salusbury, who arrived in Britain in 1798, moved to Brynbella after his marriage in 1814, which she gifted to him, and eventually became heir to the Salusbury family properties and name.

=== Written works ===
After Johnson's death, she published Anecdotes of the Late Samuel Johnson (1786) and their letters to each other (1788).

Frances Burney, who considered both Johnson and Thrale to be among her dearest friends, read the unpublished manuscript with much interest, but disapproved of the decision to publish, noting, "She has given all – every word – and thinks that, perhaps, a justice to Dr Johnson, which, in fact, is the greatest injury to his memory."

Together with Thrale's diaries, which were known as Thraliana and not published until 1942, these sources help to fill out the picture of Johnson often presented in Boswell's Life of Samuel Johnson. Johnson often stayed with the Thrale household and had his own room above the library at Streatham, in which he worked. The friendship between Johnson and Thrale was emotionally intimate, and after her husband died in 1781 "Johnson's circle took it for granted that he would marry Hester."

Based upon two letters Johnson wrote to Thrale in French and a passage in Thrale's Anecdotes of the Late Samuel Johnson, Thrale's biographer Ian McIntyre and Johnson's biographers Peter Martin and Jeffrey Meyers have suggested that Thrale and Johnson had a sadomasochistic relationship in which Thrale whipped Johnson.

Thrale also wrote Observations and Reflections made in the Course of a Journey through France, Italy, and Germany (1789), which describes her travels during her honeymoon with Piozzi. The book mostly focuses on their travel in Italy. Notably, it was one of the first travelogues written by a British woman that was written in prose rather than in letters. Although there was only one edition, it was famous enough that Queen Charlotte read it. She was also the author of two plays, both unproduced.

Her Retrospection... (1801) was an attempt at a popular history of that period, but was not received well by critics, some of whom patently resented female intrusion into what was then the male preserve of history. Reviewers also coupled sexism with ageism in dismissing her work. One reviewer called it "a series of dreams by an old lady."

According to the Oxford Dictionary of National Biography, "it has since been seen as a feminist history, concerned to show changes in manners and mores in so far as they affected women; it has also been judged to anticipate Marxian history in its keen apprehension of reification: 'machines imitated mortals to unhoped perfection, and men found out they were themselves machines.'"

A lexicographer in her own right, Mrs Piozzi's British synonymy, or, An attempt at regulating the choice of words in familiar conversation was published in 1794 by G. G. & J. Robinson of London, ten years after Dr Johnson's death.

== Death and legacy ==
Hester Piozzi died at No. 10 (now 20) Sion Row, Clifton, Bristol, of complications after a fall, and was buried on 16 May 1821 near Brynbella in the churchyard of Corpus Christi Church, Tremeirchion, next to Piozzi. A marble plaque inside the church, erected in 1909, reads:

Near this place are interred the remains of

Hester Lynch Piozzi.
"Doctor Johnson's Mrs Thrale"
Born 1741. Died 1821.
Witty. Vivacious and Charming. In an Age of Genius
She Ever Held a Foremost Place
This Tablet is Erected by Orlando Butler Fellowes
Grand-Son of Sir James Fellowes. The Intimate Friend of
Mrs. Piozzi and her Executor.
Assisted by Subscriptions

28th April 1909.

Frances Burney eulogised her, comparing her to Germaine de Staël. From the time of her death, she was referred to by scholars as Johnson had done, as Mrs Thrale or Hester Thrale, though in recent decades she has often been referred to as Hester Lynch Piozzi or Mrs Piozzi.

Samuel Beckett drew on Thrale's diaries and Anecdotes of the Late Samuel Johnson to dramatize her and Johnson's relationship in one of his earliest plays, Human Wishes. However, he abandoned the play after completing the first act. Lillian de la Torre featured Thrale in the story "The Stolen Christmas Box", part of a series featuring Johnson as a detective.

A three-act opera, Johnson Preserv'd, is by the English composer Richard Stoker with a libretto by Jill Watt. The characters are Johnson, James Boswell, Hester Thrale, Gabriel Piozzi, and Mrs Thrale's maid Polly (the only fictitious character). The opera was performed by Opera Piccola at St Pancras Town Hall, London, in July 1967, with the tenor Philip Langridge performing the role of Piozzi. It was conducted by Vilem Tausky and directed by Anthony Sharp. The vocal score was published by Peters Edition in 1971. Mrs Thrale, also referred to as Signora Piozzi, is a major character in the play Fanny Burney, based on scenes from Burney's life, in Elizabeth Goudge's Three Plays (Duckworth, London, 1939), along with Burney's father Charles Burney, her sister Susan, Johnson, Boswell, Alexandre D'Arblay (Burney's French emigré husband), and William Thackeray.

== See also ==
- Lleweni Hall
