= John Wallace (English politician) =

Member of Parliament for Tower Hamlets Limehouse
- In office 4 July 1892 – 13 July 1895
- Preceded by: Edward Samuel Norris
- Succeeded by: Harry Samuel

Personal details
- Born: 1840
- Died: 1910 (aged 70)

John Stewart Wallace (1840-1910) was a British Liberal Party politician who represented Limehouse in the East End of London in the House of Commons from 1892 to 1895.
