= Anne Gibson =

Anne Gibson may refer to:

- Anne Gibson, Baroness Gibson of Market Rasen (1940–2018), British trade unionist and peer
- Anne Gibson (badminton) (born 1968), Scottish badminton player
