= Charles Guy Parsloe =

British historian, writer and politician

Charles Guy Parsloe (5 November 1900 – 8 March 1985) was a British historian, writer and Liberal Party politician.

== Background ==
Parsloe was born the son of Henry Edward Parsloe. He was educated at Stationers' Company's School and University College, London. In 1929 he married Mary Zirphie Munro Faiers. They had two sons and one daughter.

== Professional career ==
Parsloe was Assistant in History at University College, 1925–1927; then Secretary and Librarian at the Institute of Historical Research, 1927–1943. He was Secretary of the Institute of Welding, 1943–1967 (Hon. Fellow, 1968), and Vice-President of the International Institute of Welding, 1966–1969 (Secretary-General, 1948–1966).

== Political career ==
Parsloe was Liberal candidate for the Streatham division at the 1923 General Election. He did not stand for Parliament again.

=== Electoral record ===
General Election 1923: Streatham
Party	Candidate	Votes	%	±%
Unionist	Sir William Lane-Mitchell	10,598	60.0	−9.1
Liberal	Charles Guy Parsloe	7,075	40.0	+9.1
Majority		3,523	20.0	−18.2
Turnout			61.3	−1.7
Unionist hold		Swing	-9.1	

General Election 1924: Streatham
Party	Candidate	Votes	%	±%
Unionist	Sir William Lane-Mitchell	15,936	68.5	
Liberal	Charles Guy Parsloe	4,111	17.7	
Communist	Alfred M. Wall	3,204	13.8	
Majority		11,825	50.8	
Turnout		23,251	77.75	
Unionist hold		Swing		
