= Percy Lionel Edwin Rawlins =

British judge and Liberal Party politician

His Honour Percy Lionel Edwin Rawlins (14 April 1902 – 27 April 1977) was a British judge and Liberal Party politician.

== Background ==
Rawlins was born the son of F.P.F.M. Rawlins, a solicitor, and F. Rawlins. He was educated at Highgate School and Selwyn College, Cambridge. In 1930 he married Katharine M.E. Fearnley-Sander. They had one son and one daughter.

== Professional career ==
Rawlins received a Call to Bar by Gray's Inn in 1926. He was President of the Gray's Inn Debating Society. He was a County Court Judge from 1947–67. He was Circuit judge for No 36 (Berkshire, Gloucestershire & Oxfordshire) from 1962–67.

== Political career ==
Rawlins was Liberal candidate for the Streatham division at the 1929 General Election. Streatham was a safe Unionist seat where the Liberals had come second at the previous election in 1924. He increased the Liberal vote and reduced the Unionist majority. He did not stand for parliament again.

=== Electoral record ===
General Election 1929: Streatham
| Party | Candidate | Votes | % | ±% |
|---|---|---|---|---|
| Unionist | Sir William Lane-Mitchell | 19,024 | 57.0 | −11.5 |
| Liberal | Percy Lionel Edwin Rawlins | 8,191 | 24.6 | +6.9 |
| Labour | Fred Hughes | 6,134 | 18.4 | n/a |
| Majority | | 10,833 | 32.4 | −18.4 |
| Turnout | | | | |
| Unionist hold | | Swing | -9.2 | |
