= Burke Trend =

British civil servant

Burke Frederick St John Trend, Baron Trend, GCB, CVO, PC (2 January 1914 – 21 July 1987) was a British civil servant and later Rector of Lincoln College, Oxford.

== Biography ==
Trend was educated at Whitgift School and Merton College, Oxford, where he took first class honours in Classics. He then joined the Civil Service, spending most of his career in the Treasury. He became Cabinet Secretary under Alec Douglas-Home, Harold Wilson and Ted Heath between 1963 and 1973.

Trend was appointed a Commander of the Royal Victorian Order (CVO) in the 1953 Coronation Honours. He was appointed a Companion of the Order of the Bath (CB) in the 1955 New Year Honours, promoted to Knight Commander (KCB) in the 1962 Birthday Honours and a Knight Grand Cross in the 1968 New Year Honours. On 7 March 1974 he was created a life peer as Baron Trend, of Greenwich in Greater London.

He led an investigation in the 1970s into allegations of penetration of the British Secret Services from before World War II until the 1960s. His conclusion was that there was insufficient evidence to support the allegations. Peter Wright in his memoirs, Spycatcher, discusses Trend and his report.

Trend married Patricia Charlotte Shaw in 1949; they had three children. One son, Michael Trend, was a Member of Parliament (Conservative) from 1992 to 2005.

Coat of arms of Burke Trend
Crest Upon a wreath Azure and Vert two martlets respectant supporting between their beaks Or a torch Sable inflamed Proper. Escutcheon Tierced per pale Azure Argent and Vert three piles one issuing from the dexter and two from the sinister Or each charged with an estoile Azure. Supporters Two cats Ermine each gorged with a collar Or charged with six estoiles (three manifest) Azure. Motto Ardi Contento Etaoi

Government offices
Preceded by Sir Norman Brook	Cabinet Secretary; 1963–1973	Succeeded by Sir John Hunt
Academic offices
Preceded by Sir Walter Fraser Oakeshott	Rector of Lincoln College, Oxford; 1973–1983	Succeeded by Vivian H. H. Green
