= Conservative Science & Technology Forum =

United Kingdom think tank and policy advisory body

- Headquarters: United Kingdom
- Key people: Adam Afriyie MP (Chairman)
- Affiliations: Conservative Party; Technologism; Science
- Website: www.conscitech.com

The Conservative Science & Technology Forum is a United Kingdom think tank and policy advisory body that consults industry, academia and other key figures on important (often emerging) technological and societal issues and puts these into mainstream political context.

Originally called just the Conservative Technology Forum, it grew out of the Conservative Computer Forum (founded in 1978), was relaunched in May 2011 and is affiliated to the Conservative Party. As the Conservative Technology Forum, its mandate was to research key technology subjects, how these impact society and to inform Conservative Party policy in UK and European contexts.

In October 2017, the forum expanded its remit to cover science and changed its name to the current title.

== Governance ==
The Conservative Science & Technology Forum describes itself as existing to "identify and discuss the industrial, economic and social benefits of recent technological advances in the UK" and to "contribute to shaping the Party's science & technology policies, and provide information and research support to Conservative Ministers or Spokesmen for Technology."

Its predecessor, the Conservative Computer Forum, formed from a merger of the party contact list with senior members of the computer and communications industries and a Bow Group team looking at policy towards the computer industry, was active from 1978 to 1986. During this time it was the source of policies such as Telecoms Liberalisation and Privatisation, the Micros in Schools Programme and IT Year. The publications authored by its members, usually published via CPC or the Bow Group included "Cashing in on the Chips" (CPC), "The Big Steal (Bow Group), "Learning for Change" (Bow Group), "No End of Jobs" (CPC) and "Training for jobs not just jobs for Trainers".

After it was relaunched as the Conservative Technology Forum, with a remit to cover advanced technologies in general, a centre-right, policy "think tank", 'Aediles', chaired by Malcolm Harbour MEP and directed by Simon Moores, was also formed, in 2002. Its main publication to date is "Computerising the Chinese Army" (on the state of computing in the NHS), using expertise from both ICT and Health Care industries.

The Forum has also produced a public "manifesto" in advance of each general election, alongside private submissions to those working on the main party manifesto.

The Forum was restructured after the 2010 election and the formation of a coalition, in the light of lessons learned after the 1979 General Election, when policy work within the party atrophied because those involved were elected or became special advisors and the consequent focus was on influencing or defend short-term "government policy", as opposed to longer-term "party policy". The current focus is on generating ideas and material for the Conservative Manifesto for 2015, on helping the Forum's parliamentary members to get re-elected and on providing expert speakers, bloggers and other inputs to advance and inform political debate. That entails putting technology issues, such as broadband, successful systems delivery, professionalism and skills, smart metering, smart grid, privacy and surveillance, into mainstream political context, including industry and economic policy.

As at April 2018 the leadership consists of:

- President: Adam Afriyie
- Deputy Presidents: Vicky Ford, Ashley Fox
- Vice Presidents: Kit Malthouse, John Stevenson, Ralph Palmer, Jeremy Quin, Chris Holmes, Matt Warman, Nick Wood-Dow, Malcolm Harbour, Philip Virgo, Peter Farmer, Simon Moores
- Chairman: Andrew Henderson
- Deputy Chairman: Chris Francis
- Vice Chairman: Jack Matthews
- Honorary Treasurer: Dominic Connor
- Honorary Auditor: Michael Stern
- Secretary: Will Archdeacon
- Membership: Neil Stinchcombe
