= European Communities Act 1972 (Repeal) Bills =

UK Parliament bills, c. 2012

European Communities Act 1972 (Repeal) Bill 2012-13

Parliament of the United Kingdom
- Long title: A Bill to Repeal the European Communities Act 1972 and related legislation; and for connected purposes.
- Citation: Bill 27
- Considered by: Parliament of the United Kingdom

Legislative history
- Introduced by: Douglas Carswell
- First reading: 20 June 2012
- Second reading: 26 October 2012

Related legislation
- European Communities Act 1972
- Status: Not passed

European Communities Act 1972 (Repeal) Bill 2013-14

Parliament of the United Kingdom
- Long title: A Bill to repeal the European Communities Act 1972 and related legislation; and for connected purposes.
- Citation: Bill 33
- Considered by: Parliament of the United Kingdom

Legislative history
- Introduced by: Philip Hollobone
- First reading: 24 June 2013

Related legislation
- European Communities Act 1972
- Status: Not passed

The European Communities Act 1972 (Repeal) Bills were a series of private member's bills of the Parliament of the United Kingdom to make provision for the repeal of the European Communities Act 1972 and end the United Kingdom’s membership of the European Union which at the time of the first bill being presented to Parliament for its first reading on 20 June 2012 by the then prominent Eurosceptic Conservative MP for Clacton Douglas Carswell was approaching its 40th anniversary of being on the statute book. On 26 October 2012 the first bill received its second reading with a half hour debate in the Commons however at the time it did not carry the wider support of the Conservative Party and failed to progress any further before the then current session of Parliament ended. The first bill is also notable for being the first ever private members bill ever to be crowd funded.

== Criticism ==
The first Bill was widely criticised at the time for not including any commitment to the holding of any referendum before the repeal of the European Communities Act 1972 should take place.

== Second Bill ==
The second bill of the same name was presented to Parliament for its first reading by the prominent Conservative Eurosceptic MP for Kettering Philip Hollobone almost exactly a year after the first bill was presented on 20 June 2013, some five months after the Bloomberg speech although unlike the previous bill it never received a second reading and the bill failed to progress any further partly due to the fact at exactly the same time the European Union (Referendum) Bill 2013–14 was going through the House of Commons and had the wider support of the Conservative Party including the support of the then Prime Minister David Cameron.

== Outcome ==
Although there was no direct consequences, the Bills were a direct indication of increasing political pressure from eurosceptic Conservative MP’s which would lead to the then Prime Minister David Cameron to make a major party political speech on Europe in January 2013 in what would become known as the Bloomberg speech in which the Conservative Party would support the holding of a in-out referendum on continued EU membership by the end of 2017. This referendum would be duly held in June 2016 and saw the United Kingdom vote by a narrow majority to leave the European Union. The UK left the European Union on 31 January 2020 with the European Communities Act 1972 being repealed by the European Union (Withdrawal) Act 2018 on the same day.

== See also ==
- European Union (Referendum) Bill 2013–14
- Withdrawal from the European Union
- Brexit
- European Union Act 2011
