= David Robertson (British politician) =

British politician and accountant, 1890–1970

Sir David Robertson (19 January 1890 – 3 June 1970) was a British accountant, company director and politician. From a Scottish family, he represented first a constituency in London and then the Scottish highlands constituency of Caithness and Sutherland. He was an expert on the fishing industry.

== Family and early career ==
Robertson's father John was from Caithness but became Chief Inspector of the General Post Office in Glasgow, and Robertson was brought up in the city. He went to Woodside School and Allan Glen's School. In 1907 he was apprenticed to Mitchell and Smith, Chartered Accountants, before going to the University of Glasgow.

=== Wartime civil service ===
On leaving university in 1912 Robertson joined the staff of Cole, Dickin and Hills in London. In 1915, having been a member of Glasgow University Officers' Training Corps, he was commissioned into the Argyll and Sutherland Highlanders and served during the First World War with the British Expeditionary Force in France. He was wounded in action and returned to Britain to join the civil service. He was Sectional Accountant for the Fish, Game, Poultry and Eggs Section of the Ministry of Food for a time before being promoted to Assistant Director of Finance.

=== Frozen fish industry ===
After the end of the war, Robertson was Chief Accountant to the Ministry of Food at the Peace Conference in Paris. Shortly after the end of the conference he left the civil service to go into business. He was involved in companies working in the fishing and cold storage industries, pioneering the sale of frozen fish, and became Managing Director of several businesses. In 1939, Robertson used his knowledge of the industry to propose a scheme whereby the United Kingdom could maintain a supply of frozen fish from safe fishing grounds in the event of war.

== Member of Parliament ==
In July 1938, Robertson was chosen as Conservative Party candidate for Streatham, a predominantly middle-class area of London where the sitting Member of Parliament (MP) Sir William Lane-Mitchell was retiring. In the event, the postponement of the general election due to the outbreak of war led Lane-Mitchell to resign by being appointed Steward of the Manor of Northstead in November 1939. Robertson was returned unopposed at the ensuing by-election on 7 December 1939.

Robertson's maiden speech, on his frozen fish plan, was well received. On 26 June, Robertson used a debate in the House of Commons to raise the issue of facilities for troops at London's mainline train stations. He complained that most had no facilities at all for troops to wash and sleep, and the facility at Liverpool Street station run by the YMCA was like the "Black Hole of Calcutta". Robertson's debate produced an immediate move to improve conditions.

=== Dual constituency role ===
In 1941, Robertson volunteered to take an additional role looking after the interests of the constituency of Peebles and Southern Midlothian, whose Member of Parliament Archibald Maule Ramsay had been detained under Defence Regulation 18B. However, Robertson found that the expense of representing two constituencies was too much because he was unable to charge his expenses in respect of Peebles against income tax, and he gave up the role in October 1942.

=== Housing campaign ===
Later in the war, Robertson pressed for faster repair of bomb-damaged housing in London, and called for the appointment of a "restless dynamic driver" such as Lord Beaverbrook, rather than the lawyer (Sir Malcolm Eve) who had been appointed.

He returned to the subject after the war, complaining in July 1946 that not one house in Streatham had been repaired. However, during the Parliament his main contributions to debate were on the subject of food and especially fishing. Robertson was awarded a knighthood in 1945.

=== Caithness and Sutherland ===
At the 1950 general election, Robertson moved constituencies from Streatham to fight Caithness and Sutherland, the northernmost part of mainland Scotland. The constituency had a long Liberal tradition but the Conservatives had won the seat from Liberal leader Sir Archibald Sinclair in 1945 on a pledge by the candidate Eric Gandar Dower to seek re-election after the capitulation of Japan; as a result of breaking that promise (among other things), Gandar Dower had fallen out with his Unionist Association.

Robertson faced a rematch against Sir Archibald Sinclair, who was Lord Lieutenant of Caithness. He objected that Sinclair was bringing the Lieutenancy into politics, although Sinclair pointed out that he had held the office since 1919 and had first been elected in 1922. Sinclair described Robertson's objections as "exceptionally silly pre-election stuff". Robertson won his seat, but only by 269 votes; Sinclair accepted a Viscountcy rather than try to win the seat again, and Robertson had easy re-elections thereafter.

=== Highlands industries ===
Robertson campaigned for economic development of the Scottish Highlands, arguing that Caithness made cement which came from the Medway in Kent. In 1953 he attempted to amend the budget to exempt from income tax the profits of trades by local communities, motivated by the people of Thurso who had banded together to do work which was normally reserved to local government. He failed to persuade the Treasury.

When the site of Dounreay was chosen for a nuclear power establishment, Robertson welcomed the choice and hoped it would lead to repopulation of the highlands. He also attempted to stop the increase in charges for freight on rail, claiming that sheep could be brought from New Zealand cheaper than from his constituency. Following the Suez Crisis, Robertson went on a tour of the United States defending the British policy.

In 1957 he introduced a Private member's bill, the North of Scotland Development Corporation Bill, which was aimed at setting up a group to attract new industries to his constituency and around. The Government talked the Bill out.

=== Dissatisfaction with party ===
Robertson was increasingly more interested in his own constituency than in party politics. In July 1957, while debating Highlands roads in the Scottish Grand Committee, he declared that unless the problem was dealt with, "I can assure this Committee that I will have the greatest difficulty remaining in this party"; he also described the Minister John Maclay as "a Treasury lackey and a mouthpiece for officialdom". In January 1959, he seconded an amendment moved by Labour MP Tom Fraser to continue marginal agricultural production grants, but again found Maclay unwilling to help.

This was the last straw and a week later Robertson resigned the whip in protest at the Government's handling of Scottish affairs, declaring he would sit as an independent Member of Parliament. He stated he continued to support the Conservative position on foreign affairs.

=== Police brutality ===
In his first month as an independent MP, Robertson obtained the signatures of 150 other MPs in support of a motion for an inquiry into the case of a 15-year-old boy who had been assaulted by police in Thurso; the Cabinet debated the issue and decided to set up their own inquiry. Robertson faced some local disquiet over the cost.

=== Independent member ===
At the 1959 general election, Robertson fought Caithness and Sutherland as an independent Unionist. Knowing of his local popularity, he was not opposed by an official candidate, and won his biggest majority at the election. He began the new Parliament by turning 70, and decided that it would be his last. In March 1962 he protested to the Prime Minister Harold Macmillan that as an independent MP he had not been nominated to serve on any Select Committees, because the selection was done according to the party proportion of the House. He was particularly anxious to serve on the Sea Fish Industry Bill, on which he had immense experience, and other MPs of all parties campaigned for him to be put on the committee. The Government conceded the point in relation to future committees.

== Retirement ==
In May 1963, Robertson was given the Freedom of Thurso. Although he did not fight the 1964 general election, his supporters did nominate another Independent candidate, John Young, and Robertson gave Young his support. The official Unionist, Hon. Patrick Maitland, accused Robertson's supporters of spreading defamatory rumours about him. Young had been one of four members of the Thurso Unionist Party who resigned in December 1963. Their letter of resignation was read at a meeting which unanimously endorsed the candidacy of Maitland, and their departure was described as a "welcome relief" by the chairman of the Thurso Unionists. The division in Unionist ranks led to a Liberal gain.

Parliament of the United Kingdom
Preceded by Sir William Lane-Mitchell	Member of Parliament for Streatham; 1939–1950	Succeeded by Duncan Sandys
Preceded by Eric Gandar Dower	Member of Parliament for Caithness and Sutherland; 1950–1964	Succeeded by George Mackie
