= Adam Afriyie =

British politician

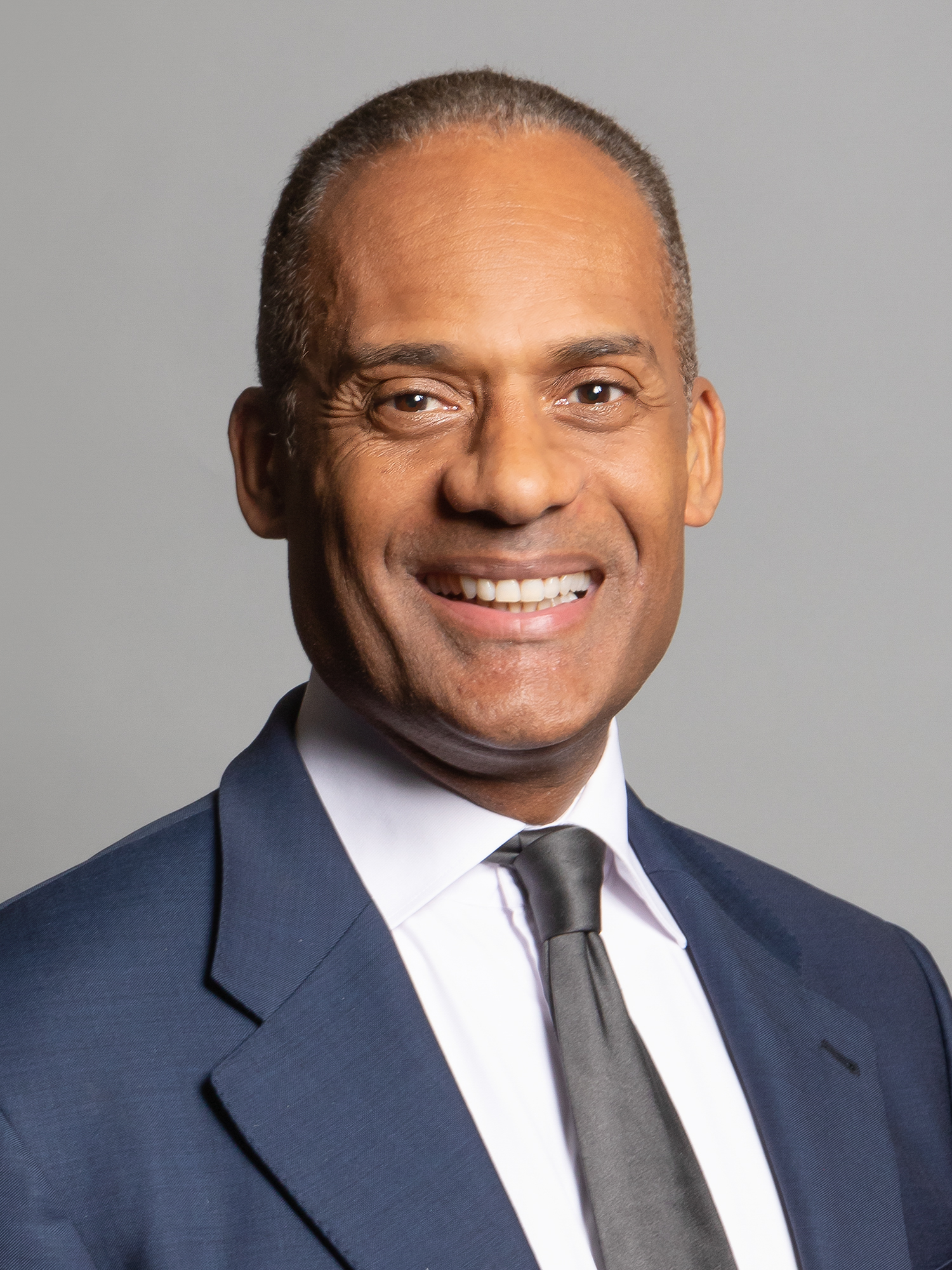
- Official portrait, 2020

Chairman of the Parliamentary Office of Science and Technology
- In office 16 November 2010 – 3 May 2017
- Prime Minister: David Cameron; Theresa May

Shadow Minister for Science and Innovation
- In office 3 July 2007 – 6 May 2010
- Leader: David Cameron

Member of Parliament for Windsor
- In office 5 May 2005 – 30 May 2024
- Preceded by: Michael Trend
- Succeeded by: Jack Rankin

Personal details
- Born: Adam Mensah Osei Afriyie; 4 August 1965 (age 60) Wimbledon, London, England
- Party: Conservative
- Spouse(s): Romi Afriyie (div. 2005) Tracy-Jane Newall (m. 2005)
- Education: Addey and Stanhope School
- Alma mater: Wye College
- Occupation: Politician; businessman
- Website: Official website Profile

Adam Mensah Osei Afriyie (born 4 August 1965) is a British politician who served as the member of parliament (MP) for Windsor from 2005 to 2024. He is a member of the Conservative Party.

== Early life and education ==
Adam Afriyie was born on 4 August 1965 in Wimbledon, London, the son of a Ghanaian father and English mother. He grew up on a council estate in Peckham, attending the local Oliver Goldsmith Primary School. He was educated at Addey and Stanhope School in New Cross, before earning a bachelor's degree in agricultural economics from Wye College in 1987.

Afriyie has seven half-siblings and one brother. He said of his upbringing: "I never knew my father until I was much older and my mother, Gwen, brought us up alone. She was my rock, the gel at the centre of my life, although her tumultuous relationships with different men made for a constant state of flux at the boundaries of our family."

== Business career ==
Afriyie was chairman of Connect Support Services, an IT support company he set up in 1993. The company went into liquidation in 2017 and was sold by administrators. The company owed £1.8 million in taxes to HMRC. He owned two thirds of DeHavilland, a political monitoring company, which was sold to publishers Emap in 2005 for £18 million. He was also a regional finalist in the 2003 Ernst and Young Entrepreneur of the Year Awards.

A member of the Conservative Party since 1990, Afriyie in 1999 worked for Jeffrey Archer on his unsuccessful campaign to be the first directly elected mayor of London.

He was a governor of the Museum of London, appointed by Tony Blair, a trustee of the Museum in Docklands (part of the Museum of London) and, from 2003 to 2005, a director of Policy Exchange, a centre right think tank.

Afriyie was a stakeholder of Axonn Media (originally called Adfero, an asset remaining from the sale of DeHavilland), a content marketing business which produces content for clients. The company incorporated brands such as Content Plus, NewsReach, DirectNews and ReelContent. Axonn turned over £9.4m in 2011, and made a pre tax profit of £1.3m. Afriyie was the largest shareholder of the firm, and he and his fellow directors split dividends of £2.2m in 2010 and 2011. The company went into liquidation in 2019, owing HMRC taxes of £492,000. Axonn was sold for £39,000, its annual turnover having fallen by over £7 million since 2013.

Afriyie became board chairman of Elite Growth, a medical cannabis firm, in 2021.

== Parliamentary career ==
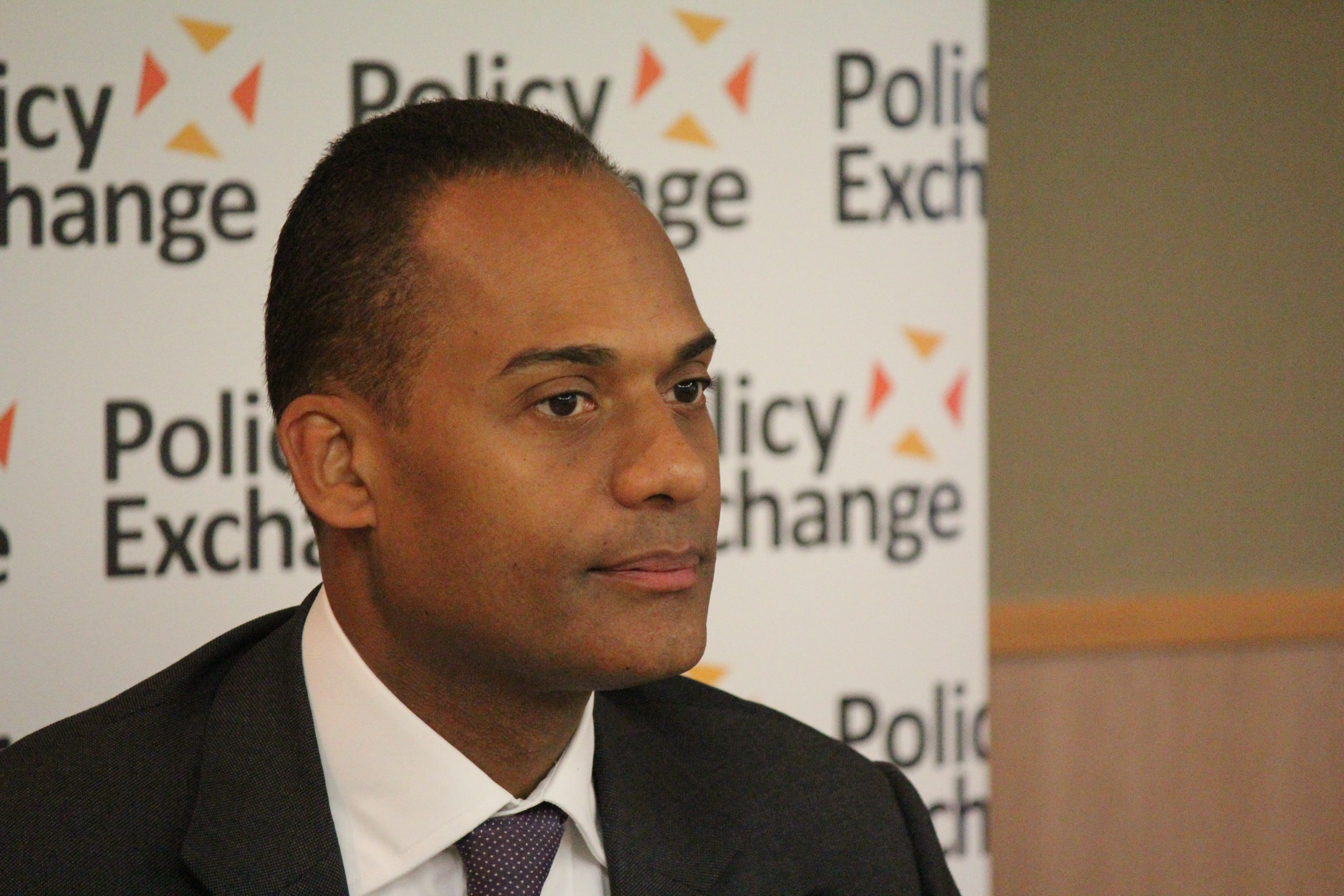
Afriyie at a Policy Exchange meeting, October 2013

At the 2005 general election, Afriyie was elected to Parliament as MP for Windsor with 49.5% of the vote and a majority of 10,292.

He is the Conservative Party's first black MP, although he said in an interview with the Evening Standard that he considers himself not as black but "post-racial". He made his maiden speech on 23 May 2005.

In Parliament, he was a member of the Science and Technology Select Committee from 2005, until its abolition in July 2007, and has since been a member of the Children, Schools and Families select committee. Since 2010, he has been the president of the Conservative Technology Forum. He was the chair of the Parliamentary Office of Science and Technology between 2010 and 2017.

Afriyie was re-elected as MP for Windsor at the 2010 general election with an increased vote share of 60.8% and an increased majority of 19,054.

In February 2013, Afriyie voted against the Marriage (Same Sex Couples) Bill, citing his fear for religious freedom, and also that he thought that straight civil partnerships should be allowed, but the bill did not include this.

In November 2013, Afriyie proposed an amendment to the European Union (Referendum) Bill 2013–14, to force an early vote for an early referendum on membership of the European Union, against the express wishes of his party. He continued to advocate an early referendum after his rebel amendment was easily defeated in the House of Commons with just 6% of the vote, citing public support for such a move.

In December 2014, Afriyie with six other Conservative MPs voted against the Equal Pay (Transparency) Bill, which would require all companies with more than 250 employees to declare the gap in pay between the average male and average female salaries.

He was mooted in early 2015 as a possible candidate for a challenge to David Cameron for leadership of the Conservative Party, but there was little support within the party for a leadership challenge or Afriyie as a potential candidate.

At the 2015 general election, Afriyie was again re-elected with an increased vote share of 63.4% and an increased majority of 25,083.

Afriyie supported Leave in the 2016 referendum, saying that "Brexit would make the UK 'safer as a nation' and 'economically more prosperous'." He continued to advocate on behalf of Brexit in Parliament in subsequent years.

At the snap 2017 general election, Afriyie was again re-elected, with an increased vote share of 64.4% and a decreased majority of 22,384. He was again re-elected at the 2019 general election, with a decreased vote share of 58.6% and a decreased majority of 20,079.

He is a steering committee member of the COVID Recovery Group, a group of Conservative MPs who opposed the UK government's December 2020 lockdown. According to The Telegraph's Christopher Hope the anti-lockdown group would be seen in Westminster as an "echo" of the Brexiteer European Research Group (ERG) of MPs, and a response by backbench Conservatives to Nigel Farage's anti-lockdown Reform UK party.

In November 2021, HMRC filed a petition for bankruptcy against Afriyie. In the past a declaration of bankruptcy would have led to his disqualification as an MP, but that now only happens if a Bankruptcy Restriction Order, imposed in cases of malfeasance or culpability, is issued. During May 2022 the Insolvency and Companies Court adjourned the petition for three months to give him time to realise funds. The MP intended to defend himself in court over the petition. He was declared bankrupt in December 2022, owing around £1 million in taxes to HMRC and £700,000 to Barclays bank.

In May 2022, the House of Commons standards body reprimanded Afriyie for failing to register his role as board chairman of Elite Growth, a cannabis distribution company. Afriyie had tried to get the Commons registry staff to retrospectively alter the records to make it to appear as if he had registered his role at the firm. Three years before, in 2019, the Commons standards commissioner reprimanded the MP for failing to declare income from letting his Windsor house through Airbnb for £2,000 a night.

In July 2022, Afriyie announced that he would not seek re-election at the 2024 general election.

== Personal life ==
In May 2004, Adam and Romi Afriyie won a libel case against The Mail on Sunday over a published article, "What IDS's Mr Perfect didn't tell Tory bosses". The article was called a "hatchet job" by Darcus Howe in the New Statesman. In August 2005 he married his second and current wife Tracy-Jane (née Newell), a barrister and former wife of Kit Malthouse, then deputy leader of Westminster City Council.

In February 2013, prior to his bankruptcy case in 2019, Afriyie's wealth was estimated at £13 million to £100 million. As of 2013, Afriyie owned a house in Westminster, as well as "The Priory" in Old Windsor.

Parliament of the United Kingdom
Preceded by Michael Trend	Member of Parliament for Windsor; 2005–2024	Succeeded by Jack Rankin
