= Windsor and Maidenhead (constituency) =

UK Parliament constituency (1974–1997)

- Former county constituency for the House of Commons
- Boundary of Windsor and Maidenhead in Berkshire for the 1992 general election

- Location of Berkshire within England
- County: Berkshire
- Major settlements: Windsor and Maidenhead

1974–1997
- Seats: One
- Created from: Windsor
- Replaced by: Windsor and Maidenhead

Windsor and Maidenhead was a county constituency in the Royal Borough of Windsor and Maidenhead in Berkshire. It returned one Member of Parliament (MP) to the House of Commons of the Parliament of the United Kingdom.

The constituency was created at the February 1974 general election and abolished at the 1997 general election, when it was replaced by the new separate constituencies of Windsor and Maidenhead.

It was a safe Conservative seat throughout its existence.

== History ==
The constituency was formed in 1983 to replace the existing seat of Windsor, with no changes to its composition.

For the 1983 general election, the boundaries were adjusted to reflect the changes to local authorities under the Local Government Act 1972.

In order to effect an increase in Berkshire's representation from 7 to 8 MPs in accordance with the Fourth periodic review of Westminster constituencies, the Windsor and Maidenhead constituency was abolished in 1997 and the two separate constituencies of Maidenhead and Windsor were created.

== Boundaries and boundary changes ==
=== 1974–1983 ===
- The Royal Borough of New Windsor;
- The Municipal Borough of Maidenhead; and
- The Rural Districts of Cookham and Windsor.

=== 1983–1997 ===
- The Royal Borough of Windsor and Maidenhead wards of Belmont, Bisham and Cookham, Boyn Hill, Bray, Castle, Clewer North, Clewer South, Cox Green, Eton North and South, Eton West, Furze Platt, Hurley, Oldfield, Park, Pinkneys Green, St Mary's, and Trinity.

The constituency gained the small town comprising the former Urban District of Eton which had been transferred from Buckinghamshire to the Royal Borough of Windsor and Maidenhead in Berkshire by the Local Government Act and was previously part of the abolished Borough Constituency of Eton and Slough. The area comprising the former Rural District of Windsor, including Old Windsor and Sunninghill, was transferred to the new constituency of East Berkshire.

On abolition, the majority of the electorate, including Maidenhead, Bisham and Cookham was transferred to the new Maidenhead constituency, with Windsor, Eton and Bray added to the re-established Windsor constituency.

== Members of Parliament ==
| Election | Member | Party |
|---|---|---|
| Feb 1974 | Sir Alan Glyn | Conservative |
| 1992 | Michael Trend | Conservative |
| 1997 | constituency abolished: see Windsor & Maidenhead | |

== Elections ==
=== Elections in the 1990s ===
General election 1992: Windsor and Maidenhead
| Party | Candidate | Votes | % | ±% |
|---|---|---|---|---|
| Conservative | Michael Trend | 35,075 | 55.5 | −1.3 |
| Liberal Democrats | Jeremy R.G. Hyde | 22,147 | 35.1 | +8.1 |
| Labour | Catherine Attlee | 4,975 | 7.9 | −3.3 |
| Green | Robert N. Williams | 510 | 0.8 | −0.4 |
| Monster Raving Loony | D.N. Askwith | 236 | 0.4 | New |
| Independent | Edith Bigg | 110 | 0.2 | New |
| Natural Law | Mike R.S. Grenville | 108 | 0.2 | New |
| Majority | | 12,928 | 20.4 | −9.4 |
| Turnout | | 63,161 | 81.6 | +6.2 |
| Conservative hold | | Swing | −4.7 | |

=== Elections in the 1980s ===
General election 1987: Windsor and Maidenhead
| Party | Candidate | Votes | % | ±% |
|---|---|---|---|---|
| Conservative | Alan Glyn | 33,980 | 56.84 | |
| Liberal | Stanley Jackson | 16,144 | 27.01 | |
| Labour | Hilary de Lyon | 6,678 | 11.17 | |
| Ind. Conservative | William Board | 1,938 | 3.24 | |
| Green | Peter Gordon | 711 | 1.19 | New |
| Blancmange Throwers | Pamela Stephenson | 328 | 0.55 | New |
| Majority | | 17,836 | 29.83 | |
| Turnout | | 59,779 | 75.37 | |
| Conservative hold | | Swing | | |

General election 1983: Windsor and Maidenhead
| Party | Candidate | Votes | % | ±% |
|---|---|---|---|---|
| Conservative | Alan Glyn | 32,191 | 58.23 | |
| Liberal | Paul Winner | 13,988 | 25.30 | |
| Labour | Valerie Price | 6,383 | 11.55 | |
| Ind. Conservative | WO Board | 1,842 | 3.33 | New |
| National Front | GFC Gillmore | 511 | 0.92 | |
| Independent | PB Illesley | 300 | 0.54 | New |
| Wessex Regionalists | Colin Bex | 68 | 0.12 | |
| Majority | | 18,203 | 32.93 | |
| Turnout | | 55,283 | 70.32 | |
| Conservative hold | | Swing | | |

=== Elections in the 1970s ===
General election 1979: Windsor and Maidenhead
| Party | Candidate | Votes | % | ±% |
|---|---|---|---|---|
| Conservative | Alan Glyn | 38,451 | 59.66 | |
| Labour | VI Price | 13,321 | 20.67 | |
| Liberal | J Farrand | 11,496 | 17.84 | |
| National Front | P Crowley | 930 | 1.44 | |
| Wessex Regionalists | Colin Bex | 251 | 0.39 | New |
| Majority | | 25,130 | 38.99 | |
| Turnout | | 64,449 | 75.43 | |
| Conservative hold | | Swing | | |

General election October 1974: Windsor and Maidenhead
| Party | Candidate | Votes | % | ±% |
|---|---|---|---|---|
| Conservative | Alan Glyn | 28,013 | 48.97 | |
| Labour | Michael Golder | 15,172 | 26.52 | |
| Liberal | GH Kahan | 14,022 | 24.51 | |
| Majority | | 12,841 | 22.45 | |
| Turnout | | 57,207 | 71.78 | |
| Conservative hold | | Swing | | |

General election February 1974: Windsor and Maidenhead
| Party | Candidate | Votes | % | ±% |
|---|---|---|---|---|
| Conservative | Alan Glyn | 31,022 | 48.85 | −10.00 |
| Liberal | GH Kahan | 16,027 | 25.24 | +13.67 |
| Labour | Michael Golder | 15,413 | 24.27 | −5.31 |
| Ind. Conservative | DP Funnell | 1,041 | 1.64 | New |
| Majority | | 14,995 | 23.61 | −5.67 |
| Turnout | | 63,503 | 80.43 | |
| Conservative win (new seat) | | | | |
