= Keith Hill (politician) =

British politician (born 1943)

The Right Honourable Keith Hill
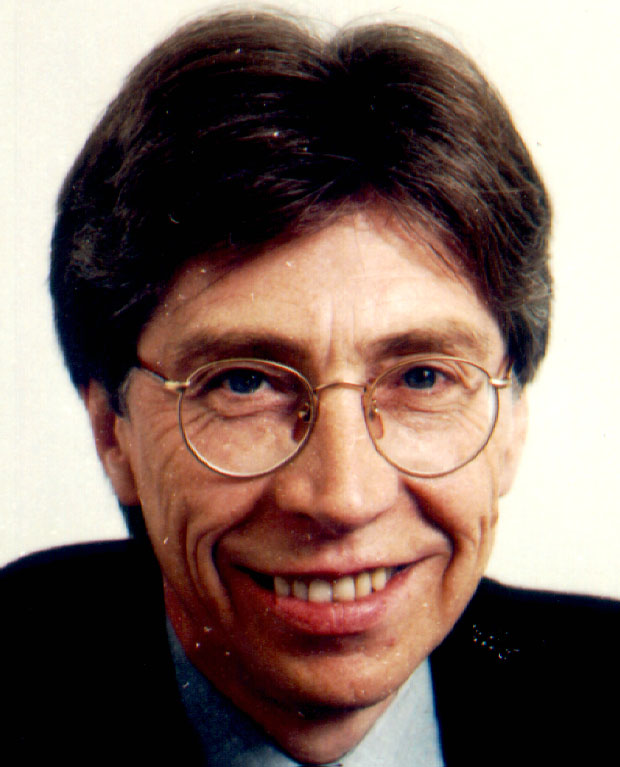
- Official portrait, 1999

Parliamentary Private Secretary to the Prime Minister
- In office 6 May 2005 – 27 June 2007
- Prime Minister: Tony Blair
- Preceded by: David Hanson
- Succeeded by: Ian Austin; Angela Smith

Minister for London
- In office 13 June 2003 – 6 May 2005
- Prime Minister: Tony Blair
- Preceded by: Tony McNulty
- Succeeded by: Jim Fitzpatrick
- In office 29 July 1999 – 8 June 2001
- Prime Minister: Tony Blair
- Preceded by: Nick Raynsford
- Succeeded by: Nick Raynsford

Minister of State for Housing and Planning
- In office 13 June 2003 – 6 May 2005
- Prime Minister: Tony Blair
- Preceded by: The Lord Rooker
- Succeeded by: Yvette Cooper

Deputy Chief Whip Treasurer of the Household
- In office 8 June 2001 – 13 June 2003
- Prime Minister: Tony Blair
- Preceded by: Keith Bradley
- Succeeded by: Bob Ainsworth

Parliamentary Under-Secretary of State for Transport
- In office 29 July 1999 – 8 June 2001
- Prime Minister: Tony Blair
- Preceded by: Glenda Jackson
- Succeeded by: David Jamieson

Member of Parliament for Streatham
- In office 9 April 1992 – 12 April 2010
- Preceded by: William Shelton
- Succeeded by: Chuka Umunna

Personal details
- Born: Trevor Keith Hill; 28 July 1943 (age 83) Leicester, Leicestershire, England
- Party: Labour
- Education: Corpus Christi College, Oxford; University of Wales, Aberystwyth

Trevor Keith Hill (born 28 July 1943) is an English Labour Party politician who served as Member of Parliament for Streatham from 1992 until 2010, as well as in a variety of Government roles as a Whip and a junior minister.

== Early life and career ==
Hill was born in Leicester and educated at City Boys' Grammar School, from where he won a scholarship to Corpus Christi College, Oxford. He completed a Diploma in Education at University College of Wales, Aberystwyth.

He was then a politics lecturer, firstly in the University of Leicester and at the University of Strathclyde from 1969 to 1973. He worked as a research officer for the Labour Party's International Department from 1974 to 1976 before becoming a political officer for the National Union of Railwaymen, subsequently amalgamated into the National Union of Rail, Maritime and Transport Workers (RMT). In the 1979 general election he stood unsuccessfully as Labour candidate in Blaby.

== Political career ==
In the 1992 election, Hill outperformed Labour's national performance by being the first Labour MP elected for the Streatham constituency. He defeated the incumbent Conservative MP Sir William Shelton by a convincing margin. This partly reflected changing demographics in the constituency, which includes a large swathe of Brixton.

Following his election as an MP, he served on the Select Committee for Transport from 1992 to 1997. His first Government appointment was as Parliamentary Private Secretary to Hilary Armstrong in 1997. He became an Assistant Government Whip from 1998 to 1999.

Hill's ministerial career started when he was appointed as Parliamentary Under Secretary for Transport (as well as Minister for London) at the then Department of Environment, Transport and the Regions (DETR) in 1999. During his time at DETR, he was responsible for local transport and transport in London.

As Minister for London, Hill was closely involved in preparing the way for London mayoral elections. This was a task that he took to with clear relish – regional television viewers saw Hill doing a rap in the middle of Trafalgar Square with a baseball hat on back to front to try to encourage young Londoners to vote in the elections.

In the ministerial appointments following the 2001 election, Hill moved to the position of Deputy Chief Whip. In a 13 June 2003 reshuffle, he was promoted to Minister of State rank and joined the Privy Council. He served as Minister for Housing and Planning at the Office of the Deputy Prime Minister until the 2005 General Election. During this period he had lead responsibility for housing, planning, the Thames Gateway, urban policy and liveability issues, and was Minister for London and the Dome. In the reshuffle following the 2005 general election, he was appointed Parliamentary private secretary to the Prime Minister, Tony Blair. He returned to the backbenches on Gordon Brown's becoming prime minister in June 2007.

Hill stood down at the 2010 general election. He was offered a knighthood in the 2010 Dissolution Honours, but declined the honour, saying he would find the "whole idea a little embarrassing and too much for me".

After leaving parliament, Hill become the chair of Lambeth Living, an ALMO (arm's length management organisation) which administers most of Lambeth Council's social housing stock.

In 2012 Hill was appointed as the independent regulator for the Association of Residential Managing Agents (ARMA) new self-regulatory regime. ARMA is a trade association for firms that manage private residential leasehold blocks of flats in England & Wales and Hill's appointment marked the first time that managing agents had been subject to independent regulation.

Hill was confirmed by Hammersmith & Fulham Council in February 2015 as chair of the Residents' Commission on Council Housing.

== Personal life ==
Now married, Hill once shared a flat with actor/comedian Eddie Izzard.

== Other ==
Hill was described by Routledge's 2002 Almanac of British Politics as "One of the government's insufficiently sung heroes".

Parliament of the United Kingdom
Preceded by Sir William Shelton	Member of Parliament for Streatham; 1992–2010	Succeeded by Chuka Umunna
Political offices
Preceded by Keith Bradley	Treasurer of the Household; 2001–2003	Succeeded by Bob Ainsworth
Preceded by Jeff Rooker	Minister of State for Housing and Planning; 2003–2005	Succeeded by Yvette Cooper
Party political offices
Preceded by Keith Bradley	Labour Deputy Chief Whip in the House of Commons; 2001–2003	Succeeded by Bob Ainsworth
