= Alan Glyn =

British politician

Sir Alan Jack Glyn ERD

Member of Parliament for Clapham
- In office 8 October 1959 – 25 September 1964
- Preceded by: Charles Gibson
- Succeeded by: Margaret McKay

Member of Parliament for Windsor
- In office 18 June 1970 – 8 February 1974
- Preceded by: Charles Mott-Radclyffe
- Succeeded by: Constituency abolished

Member of Parliament for Windsor and Maidenhead
- In office 28 February 1974 – 16 March 1992
- Preceded by: Constituency created
- Succeeded by: Michael Trend

Personal details
- Born: 26 September 1918 London, England
- Died: 5 May 1998 (aged 79) London, England
- Party: Conservative
- Spouse: Lady Rosula Windsor Clive (m. 1962)
- Children: 2
- Education: Westminster School; Caius College, Cambridge
- Profession: Medical practitioner

Sir Alan Jack Glyn ERD (26 September 1918 – 5 May 1998) was a Conservative Party Member of Parliament.

== Life and career ==
He was educated at Westminster School and Gonville and Caius College, Cambridge, where he read medicine. He proceeded to St. Bartholomew's Hospital Medical School, qualifying as a medical practitioner. He served in the army until 1967.

He married, in 1962, Lady Rosula Windsor Clive, daughter of the 2nd Earl of Plymouth. The couple had two daughters.

He represented Clapham from 1959 to 1964, Windsor from 1970 to 1974, and Windsor and Maidenhead from 1974, to his retirement in 1992, where he was succeeded by Michael Trend.

Parliament of the United Kingdom
Preceded by Charles Gibson	Member of Parliament for Clapham; 1959 – 1964	Succeeded by Margaret McKay
Preceded by Charles Mott-Radclyffe	Member of Parliament for Windsor; 1970 – Feb. 1974	Constituency abolished
New constituency	Member of Parliament for Windsor and Maidenhead; Feb. 1974 – 1992	Succeeded by Michael Trend
