= European Union (Referendum) Bill 2013–14 =

United Kingdom parliament legislation

European Union (Referendum) Bill 2013-14

Parliament of the United Kingdom
- Long title: A Bill to make provision for the holding of a referendum in the United Kingdom on the United Kingdom’s membership of the European Union.
- Citation: HL Bill 63
- Considered by: Parliament of the United Kingdom

Legislative history
- Introduced by: James Wharton
- First reading: 19 June 2013
- Second reading: 5 July 2013
- Third reading: 29 November 2013

Related legislation
- Political Parties, Elections and Referendums Act 2000; European Communities Act 1972
- Status: Blocked

The European Union (Referendum) Bill 2013–14 was a private member's bill of the Parliament of the United Kingdom designed to make provision for a referendum on membership of the European Union to be held in 2017 following renegotiation of terms between the European Union and the United Kingdom government. The bill ceased to be considered by Parliament after January 2014 and did not become law. However, a subsequent bill with the same objective, the European Union Referendum Act 2015, was later introduced to the House of Commons by the newly elected Conservative government in May 2015 was passed and received royal assent on 17 December 2015.

== Origins ==
The issue of the United Kingdom withdrawal from the European Union had been ongoing for many years before the 2010 general election, arguably since the 1975 United Kingdom European Communities membership referendum. In 2013 David Cameron pledged to renegotiate the United Kingdom's terms of membership with the European Union. In May 2013, the Conservative Party published a draft EU referendum bill and outlined their plans for renegotiation and then an in-out vote if returned to office in 2015. The draft bill stated that the referendum must be held no later than 31 December 2017. The draft was taken forward as a private member's bill in the House of Commons by the Conservative member James Wharton who had come top of a ballot of backbench MPs, entitling him to introduce a bill during the 2013–14 parliamentary session. His bill attempted to enshrine the Conservative Party Position into law before the 2015 general election. A spokesman for prime minister and Leader of the Conservative Party, David Cameron, said he was "very pleased" and would ensure the bill was given "the full support of the Conservative Party".

== Details of the Bill ==
The Bill set out the foundations for the timetable and question (Section 1), the electorate (Section 2), and the cost (Section 5).

== Referendum question ==
Originally the bill gave the question to appear on ballot papers:

Do you think that the United Kingdom should be a member of the European Union?

and in Welsh:

Ydych chi'n credu y dylai'r Deyrnas Unedig fod yn aelod o'r Undeb Ewropeaidd?

permitting a simple YES/NO answer (to be marked with a single (X)).

== Revised question recommendations ==
In the autumn of 2013 the Electoral Commission published a report which studied and tested the wording of the proposed question contained within the bill and presented two possible revised options.

=== Recommendation One ===
The first recommendation was an amended question which kept the yes/no response options:

Do you think that the United Kingdom should remain a member of the European Union?

and in Welsh:

A ddylai'r Deyrnas Unedig aros yn aelod o'r Undeb Ewropeaidd?

permitting a simple YES/NO answer (to be marked with a single (X)).

This option was presented as the original proposed question within the European Union Referendum Act 2015.

=== Recommendation Two ===
The second recommendation was an amended question which changed the responses from the yes/no options:

Should the United Kingdom remain a member of the European Union or leave the European Union?

with the responses to the question (to be marked with a single (X)):

Remain a member of the European Union
Leave the European Union

and in Welsh:

A ddylai'r Deyrnas Unedig aros yn aelod o'r Undeb Ewropeaidd neu adael yr Undeb Ewropeaidd?

with the responses (to be marked with a single (X)):

Aros yn aelod o'r Undeb Ewropeaidd
Gadael yr Undeb Ewropeaidd

The Electoral Commission tested this option but were unable to fully able to explore its full viability in the time available however it would be this exact wording and responses that would later be used and appeared on ballot papers for the 2016 EU Referendum under the European Union Referendum Act 2015.

== Concerns regarding the possibility of a Hung Parliament ==
Regarding the ability of the bill to force the next parliament into holding a referendum, a parliamentary research paper noted that:

"The Bill simply provides for a referendum on continued EU membership by the end of December 2017 and does not otherwise specify the timing, other than requiring the Secretary of State to bring forward orders by the end of 2016. These orders would need both Houses to agree to the detailed rules for the poll and the date. If no party obtained a majority at the next general election due in 2015, there might be some uncertainty about the passage of the orders in the next Parliament. Unless the orders are passed, it would not appear possible to hold the referendum, since the day and the conduct of the poll would not have received parliamentary assent."

== Progress through Parliament ==
The bill's first reading in the House of Commons was made on 19 June 2013. It received its second reading on 5 July 2013 by 304 votes to none after almost all Labour MPs and all Liberal Democrat MPs abstained. It then progressed through its Committee and Report Stages between July and November 2013 and finally cleared the Commons in November 2013.

In late 2013, Conservative MP Adam Afriyie tabled an amendment to the bill bring forward the date of the referendum to 2014 but his amendment was defeated in the House of Commons.

The bill was introduced to the House of Lords in December 2013 and had its Second Reading there on 10 January 2014. At the time it was suggested that the Bill would not 'make it through the Lords alive'. The last consideration of the bill was its examination by committee on 31 January 2014 and the debate ended at that committee stage. Peers voted by 180 to 130 not to allow more time for a debate in the Lords and no further days were scheduled. The rejection by the House of Lords effectively blocked the bill and killed off the proposed legislation.

After the bill failed to pass the House of Lords, James Wharton blamed Labour and Liberal Democrat obstructionism; however the Liberal Democrats argued that the Conservatives themselves had not assigned the bill enough time whilst Labour responded by stating that the bill was in the Conservative Party's interest rather than the national one. Wharton has since argued that his Private Member's Bill was designed to put the issue to rest.

== Criticism ==
The Bill received numerous opposition particularly from the House of Lords where the bill was blocked as well as from Labour Party and the Liberal Democrats.

Former EU commissioner Peter Mandelson criticised the bill at the time by describing it as government "grandstanding to the UKIP gathering" and also said "We need to concentrate on using all of our influence and energy in building up Britain's influence in Europe, not driving Britain out of Europe."

Liberal Democrats peer Baroness Falkner of Margravine told peers that the legislation was too "important to rush through" and although she trusted the public to make the right decision accused the government of picking the proposed 2017 date as "arbitrarily plucked out of the air".

Labour peer Baroness Quinn also criticised the bill by describing the proposed commitment as "alarming" and was "highly irregular in singling out a date".

The Bill was also described as "economically devastating", and "biased and vague".

== Outcome ==
In May 2015 the Conservative Party led by then Prime Minister David Cameron won a small but unexpected overall majority in the 2015 general election which contained a manifesto promise to hold a renegotiation of the UK's membership of the EU to be followed by a in-out referendum. It was fulfilled when a Referendum Bill was contained in the Queens speech three weeks after the election with both Labour and the Liberal Democrats dropping their previous opposition. The renegotiation was completed in February 2016 and the referendum was held on 23 June of the same year in which 51.9% of voters chose to Leave the European Union compared with 48.1% of voters who chose to Remain a member of the European Union.

== See also ==
- European Communities Act 1972
- European Union Act 2011
- European Communities Act 1972 (Repeal) Bills
