= Bill Shelton (politician) =

British politician (1929–2003)

Sir Bill Shelton

Member of Parliament for Clapham
- In office 18 June 1970 – 8 February 1974
- Preceded by: Margaret McKay
- Succeeded by: Constituency abolished

Member of Parliament for Streatham
- In office 28 February 1974 – 16 March 1992
- Preceded by: Duncan Sandys
- Succeeded by: Keith Hill

Personal details
- Born: William Jeremy Masefield Shelton; 30 October 1929 Plymouth, Devon, England
- Died: 2 January 2003 (aged 73)
- Party: Conservative

Sir William Jeremy Masefield Shelton (30 October 1929 – 2 January 2003) was a Conservative Party politician in the United Kingdom. He was member of parliament for Clapham from 1970 to February 1974, then for Streatham from February 1974 until he lost the seat to Labour Party candidate Keith Hill in 1992.

== Business and personal life ==
Shelton was born in Plymouth, the son of Lt Col Richard Shelton of Guernsey, and attended Radley College in Radley, Berkshire. He was evacuated in 1940, studying at Tabor Academy in Marion, Massachusetts, on an English-Speaking Union scholarship, and then Worcester College, Oxford, where he read Philosophy, Politics and Economics. Then he lectured on economics for a year at the University of Texas at Austin, before moving into business and advertising, which included work in South America.

Shelton married Anne Warder in 1960, and was knighted in 1989.

Shelton developed Alzheimer's disease in the 1990s, and it eventually caused his death. He also lost heavily in the financial crisis at Lloyd's of London and the 1990s property slump. Furthermore, accusations of financial irregularity led to the closure in 1995 of Access to Justice, a company that he had set up to provide free legal advice to people on low incomes. Consequently, he was given a five-year ban from serving as a company director.

== Political career ==
Shelton entered politics upon his return to London in 1964, becoming that year the president of the Wandsworth Young Conservatives. He was elected to the Greater London Council to represent Wandsworth in 1967, and in 1968 he became the Chief Whip of the Conservative majority on the Inner London Education Authority.

Shelton's association with Margaret Thatcher began when she became Shadow Secretary of State for Education and Science in 1967. He soon showed his independence of mind, refusing to participate in the opposition directed towards his Labour opponent in the 1970 election, and becoming an early monetarist, a supporter of the European Economic Community as a trade bloc, and an advocate of parental choice in schooling. He was also a traditionalist on moral issues, a Zionist, and concerned with Greek and Polish interests. He served as Parliamentary Private Secretary to Sir John Eden, Minister of State for Posts and Telecommunications from 1972 to 1974.

Shelton was one of the first people to advocate for Thatcher to succeed Edward Heath as Conservative leader, becoming second-in-command to campaign manager Airey Neave. Shelton is reputed to have organised the successful "stealth" campaign to convince backbench Conservatives on the party's right wing that by backing Thatcher in the leadership ballot they could oust Heath. After Thatcher's victory in the leadership election, Shelton became her Parliamentary Private Secretary, but resigned the following year, preferring the freedom of the backbenches. He continued his interest in education, repeatedly being elected vice-chairman of the backbench Conservative Education Committee, and serving as a junior minister in the Department of Education and Science from 1981 to 1983, in which role he increased computer provision in primary schools and proposed a new vocational qualification of secondary education.

Shelton became an increasingly vocal critic of local government. He clashed with the left-wing leadership of his local Lambeth Council and promoted a bill in 1981 to restrain local-government spending. However, he opposed Thatcher's flagship Community Charge ('poll tax') because it was designed to give local authorities more independence.

Shelton was known as a Thatcherite, serving on Thatcher's campaign team in the leadership election of 1989 and opposing her resignation in 1990. He was confident of retaining his seat in 1992, but, having been defeated, he received 5000 letters of thanks, mostly from people who had voted Labour.

Parliament of the United Kingdom
Preceded by Margaret McKay	Member of Parliament for Clapham; 1970–February 1974	Constituency abolished
Preceded by Duncan Sandys	Member of Parliament for Streatham; February 1974–1992	Succeeded by Keith Hill
