= Ethel Chipchase =

British trade unionist

Ethel Eleanor Beatrice Chipchase (February 1916 – 1 February 1986) was a British trade unionist.

Born in Poplar, London, Chipchase grew up in poverty, during the Great Depression. She later stated that during the whole period, her father never had a full week's work, and her mother helped raise money by working as a dressmaker. She attended Sir John Cass Technical Institute and Morley College.

Chipchase found work as a railway clerk, and joined the Transport Salaried Staffs Association (TSSA). She also became active in the Labour Party, standing for the party in Esher at the 1950 United Kingdom general election, taking second place with 28.6% of the vote.

In 1962, Chipchase moved to work for the Trades Union Congress (TUC), initially as Woman Officer in its Organisation Department. She later became Secretary of its Women's Advisory Committee. She was also appointed to the Equal Opportunities Commission and the Women's National Commission, which at one point she jointly chaired with Margaret Thatcher. When she retired in 1980, the TUC described as having helped to pioneer the Equal Pay Act 1970 and Sex Discrimination Act 1975.

Chipchase also had significant impact on the TUC's policy at the International Labour Organization, and served as the vice-chair of its committee which developed the Declaration and Resolution Concerning a Plan of Action, which was passed at the World Conference on Women, 1975, and fed into the United Nations General Assembly Resolution 3520.

Chipchase was made a Member of the Order of the British Empire in 1972.

Trade union offices
Preceded by Margaret McKay	Women's Officer of the Trades Union Congress; 1962–1980	Succeeded by Anne Gibson
