= DeHavilland =

British media company

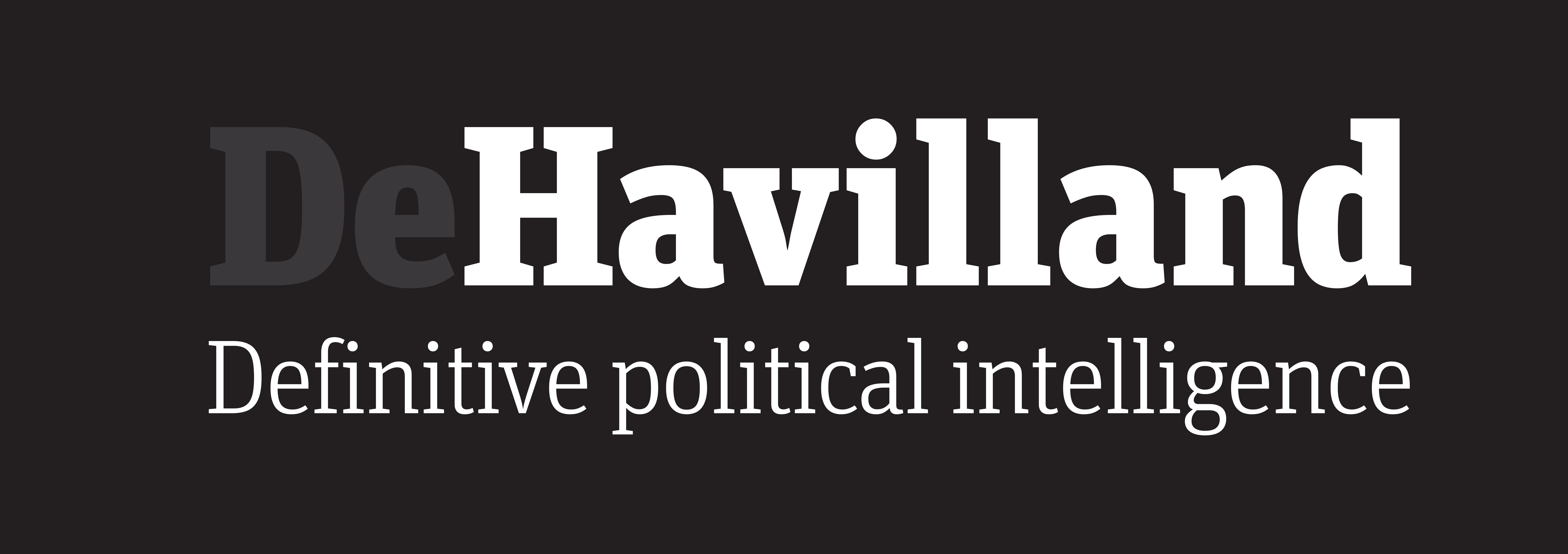
- Industry: Publishing, public affairs
- Founded: 1998
- Headquarters: London, United Kingdom
- Key people: Andrew Himsley (CEO)
- Website: dehavilland.co.uk

DeHavilland Information Services Ltd is a British media company that provides political monitoring services for public affairs professionals. The company was founded in 1998 by Conservative MP Adam Afriyie.

== History ==
DeHavilland Global Knowledge Distribution PLC was set up in 1998 by Adam Afriyie and William Bracken. The business was initially funded using profits from Afriyie's previous successful business venture, IT solutions firm Connect Support Services Ltd.

Based in a small office in Victoria, London, the service was set up to offer a tailored stream of information and analysis covering the latest developments in UK politics, designed to assist public affairs professionals in achieving their campaigning objectives.

Later moving to Canary Wharf in December 1998, the company initially provided both a news service entitled DirectNews and a core monitoring product entitled Public Affairs Briefing.

Afriyie sold his 72 per cent stake in DeHavilland to publishing, information and events business EMAP in July 2005 for a reported £13m, two months after he became Conservative MP for Windsor.

Immediately prior to the sale the news division was separated out to become a standalone company, Adfero Ltd. Adfero was later rebranded as content marketing agency Axonn Media.

Having previously been listed on the FTSE 100 Index, EMAP was bought by Apax and Guardian Media Group in 2008.

In 2010, a London-and-Brussels-based sister service, DeHavilland EU, was created.

EMAP was rebranded to Top Right Group in 2012, and DeHavilland became part of the company's 4C information services division.

In 2012, it was widely reported that DeHavilland would be sold to rival political monitoring provider Dods (Group) PLC. However, the planned deal was dropped after being referred to the Competition Commission by the Office of Fair Trading, which ruled that if combined, the two companies would command a market share of more than 25 per cent.

The OFT concluded: "The evidence suggests that the parties are by far, the largest suppliers in the market. The OFT has found that the parties are also close competitors, indeed each other’s closest competitor, the estimated diversion ratios between them are high. Internal documents suggest that this acquisition could aid Dods to maintain and increase its yields rather have them reduced by competition".

DeHavilland therefore remained a subsidiary of Top Right Group, which was again renamed in late 2015, becoming known as Ascential Group. Following rumours of a sale, the company floated on the stock exchange at £800m in early 2016.

On 12 February 2021 it was announced that DeHavilland and had been sold for £13 million to international alternative asset fund management group Bridgepoint. On 4 August 2023, Bowmark Capital, a mid-market private equity firm, has invested in DeHavilland too.

== People ==
A successful businessman at the time he created the company, founder Adam Afriyie stepped back from day-to-day operations in his latter years of financial involvement in DeHavilland, ultimately selling his two-thirds stake in 2005, the same year he entered Parliament as the Conservative MP for Windsor.

Former employees of DeHavilland include Conservative MP Conor Burns and Liberal Democrat MP Edward Morello.
