= William Pearce (Liberal politician) =

English chemical manufacturer and politician

Sir William Pearce in 1929

Sir William Pearce (18 March 1853 – 24 August 1932) was an English chemical manufacturer and Liberal Party politician in the East End of London, in England. He was Member of Parliament (MP) for Limehouse constituency from 1906 to 1922. He played cricket as an amateur for Kent County Cricket Club and Essex County Cricket Club in his 20s, making three first-class appearances, all of them for Kent.

== Family and education ==
Pearce was born in Poplar, London, the son of William Pearce, a chemical manufacturer based in East London. He was educated at the Royal College of Chemistry and School of Mines and at the Royal College of Science in South Kensington. In 1885, he married Ethel Alexandra, the daughter of Edwin Neame from Selling, a member of the Faversham based Shepherd Neame brewing family. They had four daughters and a son who died in December 1914 whilst serving in the Artists Rifles during World War One.

== Career ==
Pearce followed his father into the chemical trade. He became a director of Spencer, Chapman & Messel, Ltd which was located in Silvertown. He later became a vice-president of the Federation of British Industries and was a Fellow of the Chemical Society. He also served as the first Treasurer of the Association of British Chemical Manufacturers which was established in October 1916 to encourage co-operation in the industry in the face of effective co-ordination of the sector by wartime Germany. He was later elected a member of the Council of the London Chamber of Commerce.

== Politics ==
=== Local politics ===
Pearce entered politics through local service. He was first elected as a member of the London School Board representing the Tower Hamlets Division at the elections of 1876 and served on the School Board for many years. In 1892 he was adopted as Progressive candidate for the London County Council (LCC) elections in the Tower Hamlets (Limehouse) division. He won his seat, topping the poll, gaining more votes than the sitting Progressive Party member, Arthur Leon. He represented Limehouse until 1901 during which time he sat on the Technical Education Board (1895–99). He was also a chairman of the Main Drainage Committee.

=== Parliament ===
Pearce first stood for Parliament at the 1900 general election for Limehouse the same division as he represented at LCC level. While he gained 41% of the votes, he was unable to unseat the sitting Unionist MP, Harry Samuel, losing by 538 votes.

He stood again in Limehouse at the 1906 general election. This was the year of the Liberal landslide and Pearce gained the seat from Samuel in another straight fight by a majority of 974 votes. In the general elections of January and December 1910 Pearce retained his seat, each time by the same majority, 431 votes.

At the next general election in 1918, Pearce was in receipt of the Coalition Coupon and was therefore not opposed by the Unionists who were supporters of the Coalition government of David Lloyd George. He did face Labour Party and National Party opposition but won comfortably by a majority of 3,390 and 60% of the poll.

In 1922 Pearce fought as a National Liberal, i.e. a continuing supporter of the Lloyd George wing of the Liberal Party. However he tried to keep the vexed question of Liberal Party internal politics out of the campaign. In the East End he said, it was less a matter of party politics than but how to recover commercial and industrial prosperity. He did however concede he was against 'Soviet style experiments'. At this election he was opposed in Limehouse by the Labour Party whose candidate was future Prime Minister Clement Attlee. Attlee insisted the real issue was Capital against Labour, a system based on exploitation or cooperative Commonwealth. In a straight fight Attlee gained the seat with a majority of 1,899 votes. Attlee held the seat until 1950 when it was abolished in boundary changes.

Pearce, who was by now almost 70 years old, did not stand at any further parliamentary elections.

== Other appointments and honours ==
Pearce was made a Knight Bachelor in the King's birthday honours list of 1915. During the Great War he was appointed to sit on the Committee for After-War Trade chaired by Lord Balfour of Burleigh. At the time of Pearce's appointment the committee was charged with investigating the possibility of substituting the metric and decimal systems for the existing systems of weights and coinage and currency. He also served on a committee advising the Minister of Reconstruction Dr Addison on the procedure which should be adopted for dealing with the chemical trades after the war.

== War Profits committee ==
In 1919 Pearce was appointed to chair the Select Committee of the House of Commons on War Profits. Its remit was to inquire into the practicability of a tax on wartime increases in wealth and it heard evidence into 1920. Despite Pearce's chairmanship being praised for its tact and ability, the committee was deadlocked and could not agree what the level of taxation should be – if any. It continued to meet but its members only seemed able to agree that any worthwhile levy on war profits was not practical politics. Eventually a compromise position was reached which was endorsed by all the members of the committee and a report, drafted by Pearce, was adopted unanimously. The committee did not recommend a war profits levy, merely advising that a levy could be imposed with the support of the government and Parliament but it did recommend that if the tax were levied it should be at the most modest level put before the committee by the Board of Inland Revenue affecting no more than 75,000 taxpayers. This scheme was reckoned to bring in about £500 million pounds for the government. However, there was strong opposition in the business community and this was reflected in Cabinet discussions. Eventually it was decided not to introduce the scheme but simply to stick to the existing excess profits duties.

== Other parliamentary work ==
In addition to his war profits responsibility, Pearce was asked to chair committees dealing with housing, the funding of hospitals and the relief of unemployment. He also served on a committee appointed under the Gas Regulation Act 1920 (10 & 11 Geo. 5. c. 28) to decide the appropriate level of carbon monoxide for use in domestic gas supply.

== Cricket ==
Pearce played in three first-class cricket matches in 1878 for Kent County Cricket Club. A right-handed batsman, he scored a total of 50 runs and took six wickets, including a hat-trick in his first over in his final first-class match, a fixture against Derbyshire at . As well as playing for Kent, he played for Essex County Cricket Club between 1877 and 1881 before the club had first-class status, as well as for the Gentlemen of Essex, Surrey Colts and Brentwood Cricket Club.

== Death ==
Pearce died aged 79 on 24 August 1932 at Walmer in Kent.

== Bibliography ==
- Carlaw, Derek (2020). Kent County Cricketers, A to Z: Part One (1806–1914) (PDF). Cardiff: ACS.

Parliament of the United Kingdom
Preceded by Sir Harry Samuel	Member of Parliament for Limehouse; 1906–1922	Succeeded by Clement Attlee
