= Walter Greaves-Lord =

British Member of Parliament and judge

Portrait by Walter Stoneman, 1922

Sir Walter Greaves Greaves-Lord (born Walter Greaves Lord; 21 September 1878 – 18 June 1942) was a British Member of Parliament and judge.

Born in Ince, Lord was educated at Wigan Grammar School, Southport College and University College, Liverpool. He became a barrister with Gray's Inn, a King's counsel in 1919, a bencher in 1920, and treasurer of the inn in 1933.

Lord changed his surname to "Greaves-Lord" in 1910. That year, he stood for the Conservative Party in Ince, but was not elected. He remained involved with the party, and was elected for Norwood at the 1922 general election, serving until February 1935, when he was appointed as a High Court Judge. He also served as chancellor of the Primrose League in 1926/27. In 1927, he was knighted.

Greaves-Lord served as a judge until 1940, when he retired.

Parliament of the United Kingdom
Preceded by Harry Samuel	Member of Parliament for Norwood; 1922–1935	Succeeded by Duncan Sandys
