= Limehouse (UK Parliament constituency) =

Parliamentary constituency in the United Kingdom, 1885–1950

- Former borough constituency for the House of Commons
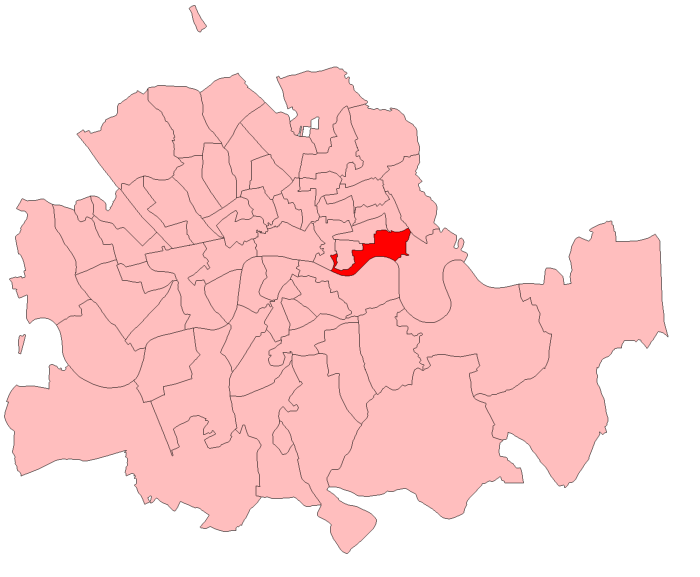
- Limehouse in London 1885-1918

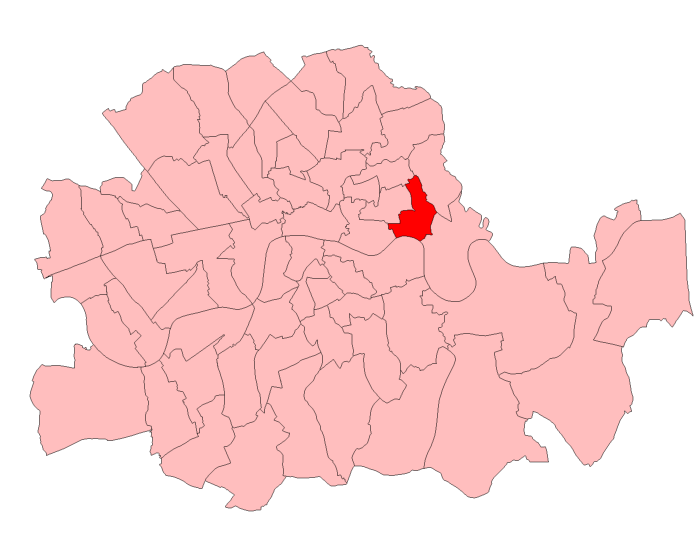
- Limehouse in London 1918-50

1885–1950
- Seats: one
- Created from: Tower Hamlets
- Replaced by: Stepney

Limehouse was a borough constituency centred on the Limehouse district of the East End of London. It returned one Member of Parliament (MP) to the House of Commons of the Parliament of the United Kingdom.

== History ==
The constituency was created by the Redistribution of Seats Act 1885 for the 1885 general election, and abolished for the 1950 general election.

Its most prominent MP was Labour's Clement Attlee, party leader from 1935 to 1955, and Prime Minister from 1945 to 1951.

== Boundaries ==

In 1885 the area was administered as part of the county of Middlesex. It was located in the Tower division, in the east of the historic county. The neighbourhood of Limehouse formed a division of the parliamentary borough of Tower Hamlets. The parliamentary division was part of the East End of London.

In 1889 the Tower division of Middlesex was severed from the county, for administrative purposes. It became part of the County of London. In 1900 the lower tier of local government in London was re-modelled. Limehouse became part of the Metropolitan Borough of Stepney.

When a re-distribution of parliamentary seats took place in 1918, the constituency became a division of Stepney. It comprised the wards of Limehouse North, Limehouse South, Mile End Old Town North East, Mile End Old Town South East, and Ratcliffe.

== Members of Parliament ==
Election	Member	Party	Notes
1885	Edward Samuel Norris	Conservative	
1892	John Wallace	Liberal	
1895	Harry Samuel	Conservative	
1906	William Pearce	Liberal	
1916	William Pearce	Coalition Liberal	
Jan 1922	William Pearce	National Liberal	
1922	Clement Attlee	Labour	Deputy Prime Minister of the United Kingdom (1942–1945); Prime Minister of the United Kingdom (1945–1951); Contested Walthamstow West following redistribution
1950	Constituency abolished		

== Election results ==
=== Election results 1885–1918 ===
==== Elections in the 1880s ====
General election 1885: Tower Hamlets, Limehouse
Party	Candidate	Votes	%
Conservative	Edward Samuel Norris	2,566	60.5
Liberal	James George Cotton Minchin	1,676	39.5
Majority		890	21.0
Turnout		4,242	71.2
Registered electors		5,954	
Conservative win (new seat)			

General election 1886: Tower Hamlets, Limehouse
Party	Candidate	Votes	%	±%
Conservative	Edward Samuel Norris	2,230	61.0	+0.5
Liberal	Thomas Edward Scrutton	1,428	39.0	−0.5
Majority		802	22.0	+1.0
Turnout		3,658	61.4	−9.8
Registered electors		5,954		
Conservative hold		Swing	+0.5	

==== Elections in the 1890s ====
General election 1892: Tower Hamlets, Limehouse
Party	Candidate	Votes	%	±%
Liberal	John Stewart Wallace	2,475	51.8	+12.8
Conservative	Harry Samuel	2,305	48.2	−12.8
Majority		170	3.6	N/A
Turnout		4,780	74.0	+12.6
Registered electors		6,456		
Liberal gain from Conservative		Swing	+12.8	

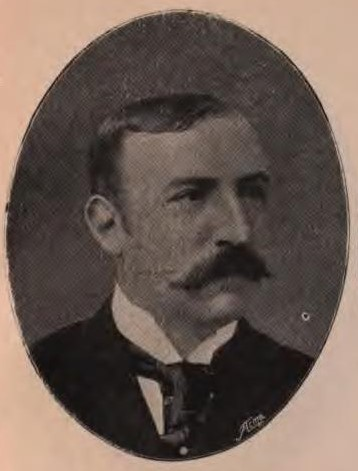
Harry Samuel

General election 1895: Tower Hamlets, Limehouse
Party	Candidate	Votes	%	±%
Conservative	Harry Samuel	2,661	56.2	+8.0
Lib-Lab	William Marcus Thompson	2,071	43.8	−8.0
Majority		590	12.4	N/A
Turnout		4,732	75.0	+1.0
Registered electors		6,309		
Conservative gain from Liberal		Swing	+8.0	

==== Elections in the 1900s ====
General election 1900: Tower Hamlets, Limehouse
Party	Candidate	Votes	%	±%
Conservative	Harry Samuel	2,608	55.8	−0.4
Liberal	William Pearce	2,070	44.2	+0.4
Majority		538	11.6	−0.8
Turnout		4,678	68.4	−6.6
Registered electors		6,835		
Conservative hold		Swing	−0.4	

Pearce

General election 1906: Tower Hamlets, Limehouse
Party	Candidate	Votes	%	±%
Liberal	William Pearce	2,981	59.8	+15.6
Conservative	Harry Samuel	2,007	40.2	−15.6
Majority		974	19.6	N/A
Turnout		4,988	80.0	+11.6
Registered electors		6,234		
Liberal gain from Conservative		Swing	+15.6	

==== Elections in the 1910s ====
General election January 1910: Tower Hamlets, Limehouse
Party	Candidate	Votes	%	±%
Liberal	William Pearce	2,826	54.1	−5.7
Conservative	George Borwick	2,395	45.9	+5.7
Majority		431	8.2	−11.4
Turnout		5,221	81.5	+1.5
Registered electors		6,405		
Liberal hold		Swing	-5.7	

General election December 1910: Tower Hamlets, Limehouse
Party	Candidate	Votes	%	±%
Liberal	William Pearce	2,557	54.6	+0.5
Conservative	Patrick Rose-Innes	2,126	45.4	−0.5
Majority		431	9.2	+1.0
Turnout		4,683	73.1	−8.4
Registered electors		6,405		
Liberal hold		Swing	+0.5	

=== Election results 1918–1950 ===
==== Elections in the 1910s ====
General election 1918: Stepney, Limehouse
Party		Candidate	Votes	%
C	Coalition Liberal	William Pearce	5,860	59.9
	Labour	D. D. Sheehan	2,470	25.2
	National	Charles Herbert Roswell	1,455	14.9
Majority			3,390	34.7
Turnout			9,785	33.4
Registered electors			29.275	
	National Liberal win (new boundaries)			
C indicates candidate endorsed by the coalition government.

==== Elections in the 1920s ====
General election 1922: Limehouse
Party	Candidate	Votes	%	±%
Labour	Clement Attlee	9,688	55.4	+30.2
National Liberal	William Pearce	7,789	44.6	−15.3
Majority		1,899	10.8	N/A
Turnout		17,477	57.8	+24.4
Registered electors		30,261		
Labour gain from National Liberal		Swing	+22.7	

General election 1923: Limehouse
Party	Candidate	Votes	%	±%
Labour	Clement Attlee	11,473	68.5	+13.1
Unionist	Thomas Miller-Jones	5,288	31.5	New
Majority		6,185	37.0	+26.2
Turnout		16,761	55.0	−2.8
Registered electors		30,452		
Labour hold		Swing		

General election 1924: Stepney, Limehouse
Party	Candidate	Votes	%	±%
Labour	Clement Attlee	11,713	57.7	−8.8
Unionist	Thomas Miller-Jones	5,692	28.1	−3.4
Liberal	Henry Bryant Marks	2,869	14.2	New
Majority		6,021	29.6	−7.4
Turnout		20,274	65.6	+10.6
Registered electors		30,927		
Labour hold		Swing	-3.7	

General election 1929: Limehouse
Party	Candidate	Votes	%	±%
Labour	Clement Attlee	13,872	55.9	−1.8
Unionist	Evan Morgan	6,584	26.5	−1.6
Liberal	Jasper Addis	4,116	16.6	+2.4
Communist	Wally Tapsell	245	1.0	New
Majority		7,288	29.4	−0.2
Turnout		24,817	64.6	−1.0
Registered electors		38,440		
Labour hold		Swing	-0.1	

==== Elections in the 1930s ====
General election 1931: Stepney, Limehouse
Party	Candidate	Votes	%	±%
Labour	Clement Attlee	11,354	50.5	−5.4
Conservative	Richard Girouard	10,803	48.1	+21.6
New Party	Herbert Hodge	307	1.4	New
Majority		551	2.4	−27.0
Turnout		22,464	58.1	−6.5
Registered electors		38,682		
Labour hold		Swing	-13.5	

General election 1935: Stepney, Limehouse
Party	Candidate	Votes	%	±%
Labour	Clement Attlee	14,600	66.5	+16.0
Conservative	Charles Busby	7,355	33.5	−14.6
Majority		7,245	33.0	+30.6
Turnout		21,955	59.3	+1.2
Registered electors		37,020		
Labour hold		Swing	+15.3	

==== Elections in the 1940s ====
General election 1945: Stepney, Limehouse
Party	Candidate	Votes	%	±%
Labour	Clement Attlee	8,398	83.8	+17.3
Conservative	Alfred Woodard	1,618	16.2	−17.3
Majority		6,780	67.6	+34.6
Turnout		10,016	61.2	+1.9
Registered electors		16,367		
Labour hold		Swing	+17.3	

Parliament of the United Kingdom
Preceded by Bow and Bromley	Constituency represented by the leader of the opposition 1935–1940	Succeeded by Keighley
Preceded by Wakefield	Constituency represented by the leader of the opposition 1945	Succeeded by Woodford
Preceded by Woodford	Constituency represented by the prime minister 1945–1950	Succeeded by Walthamstow West
