= 1935 Norwood by-election =

UK Parliamentary by-election

The 1935 Norwood by-election was a by-election held in the United Kingdom on 14 March 1935 to elect a new Member of Parliament (MP) for the UK House of Commons constituency of Norwood. Demographically at the time the seat was almost equally split between housing with gardens (including some flats) and generally depressed, subdivided Victorian property such as in Herne Hill and Tulse Hill elements of the seat where wages were low on the back of a continuing high unemployment rate.

The by-election was held due to the resignation of the incumbent Conservative MP, Walter Greaves-Lord to serve as a High Court judge.

An Independent Conservative candidate was fielded at the by-election by Randolph Churchill, who sponsored Richard Findlay, a member of the British Union of Fascists to stand. This got no support from the press or from any Members of Parliament, despite Randolph being the son of Winston Churchill. and it was won by the official Conservative candidate Duncan Sandys. In September that year, Duncan Sandys became son-in-law of Winston and brother-in-law of Randolph by marrying Diana Churchill.

Norwood by-election, 1935
Party	Candidate	Votes	%	±%
Conservative	Duncan Sandys	16,147	51.1	−29.9
Labour	Barbara Gould	12,799	40.4	+21.4
Ind. Conservative	Richard Findlay	2,698	8.6	New
Majority		3,348	10.7	−51.3
Turnout		31,644	53.4	−10.5
Conservative hold		Swing	-25.7	
