= Michael Trend =

British politician (born 1952)

The Honourable Michael Trend CBE

Member of Parliament for Windsor Windsor and Maidenhead (1992–97)
- In office 9 April 1992 – 11 April 2005
- Preceded by: Alan Glyn
- Succeeded by: Adam Afriyie

Personal details
- Born: 19 April 1952 (age 74) Greenwich, England
- Party: Conservative
- Spouse: Jill Kershaw (m. 1987)
- Parent: Burke Trend (father)
- Education: Oriel College, Oxford
- Profession: Journalist

Michael St John Trend, CBE (born 19 April 1952) is a British former Conservative politician and journalist who was a member of parliament from 1992 to 2005, when he stood down after an expenses scandal.

== Early life ==
He is the son of Lord Trend, the former Cabinet Secretary. He attended the independent Westminster School, then went to Oriel College, Oxford where he gained an MA in Modern History. He became a journalist for The Times Literary Supplement, History Today and The Spectator. He was chief leader writer for The Daily Telegraph from 1990 to 1992.

== Parliamentary career ==
He was elected at the 1992 General Election as the Member of Parliament (MP) for Windsor and Maidenhead in Berkshire. When that constituency was abolished for the 1997 Election, he was returned for the new constituency of Windsor. Trend was a frontbench spokesman and Deputy Chairman and Chief Executive of the Conservative Party until 2000.

He was Chairman of the party's International Office until September 2005, and has done extensive democracy building work in much of the former Soviet Union, and also in Africa.

== Fraudulent expenses claim ==
In December 2002, Trend agreed to repay £90,000 to the House of Commons, after accepting that he wrongly claimed the money as an allowance. In February 2003, Trend was found guilty of abusing the allowances system, and ordered to repay £90,277.

He was briefly suspended from Parliament, and did not stand again at the following election. Trend claimed he "believed that I could properly continue to designate London as 'home' for the purposes of ACA, even though, in domestic terms, Windsor had become my 'main residence'." It was not accepted.

There was no doubt in the Standard's Committee's minds that there was no "real scope for doubt that the words 'main residence' were intended to have other than their natural meaning." The Committee ruled that: "Mr Trend should have recognised that, by claiming Additional Costs Allowance in relation to his Windsor home, the taxpayer was meeting some of the core running costs of what was in reality his main residence. He should have realised that this was wrong".

"Accordingly, we agree with the Commissioner that Mr Trend was negligent, and has breached the Code of Conduct by making improper use of the Additional Costs Allowance, and by failing strictly to observe the administrative rules relating to the Allowance."

== Personal life ==
He has written extensively about music. He married Jill Kershaw in February 1987, in Westminster. They have a son and two daughters. For many years, he was the organist of his local church.

Parliament of the United Kingdom
Preceded by Alan Glyn	Member of Parliament for Windsor and Maidenhead; 1992 – 1997	Constituency abolished
New constituency	Member of Parliament for Windsor; 1997 – 2005	Succeeded by Adam Afriyie
