= Duncan Sandys =

British politician (1908–1987)

The Right Honourable The Lord Duncan-Sandys CH PC
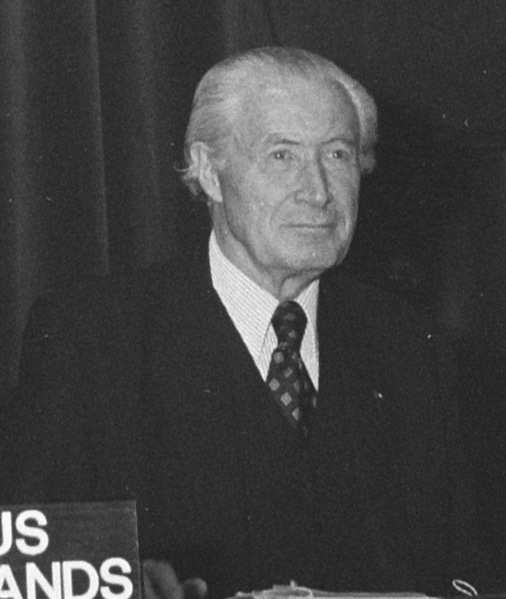
- Sandys in 1975

Secretary of State for the Colonies
- In office 13 July 1962 – 16 October 1964
- Prime Minister: Harold Macmillan; Alec Douglas-Home
- Preceded by: Reginald Maudling
- Succeeded by: Anthony Greenwood

Secretary of State for Commonwealth Relations
- In office 27 July 1960 – 16 October 1964
- Prime Minister: Harold Macmillan; Alec Douglas-Home
- Preceded by: Alec Douglas-Home
- Succeeded by: Arthur Bottomley

Minister of Aviation
- In office 14 October 1959 – 27 July 1960
- Prime Minister: Harold Macmillan
- Preceded by: Office Created
- Succeeded by: Peter Thorneycroft

Minister of Defence
- In office 14 January 1957 – 14 October 1959
- Prime Minister: Harold Macmillan
- Preceded by: Antony Head
- Succeeded by: Harold Watkinson

Minister of Housing and Local Government
- In office 19 October 1954 – 4 January 1957
- Prime Minister: Winston Churchill; Sir Anthony Eden
- Preceded by: Harold Macmillan
- Succeeded by: Henry Brooke

Minister of Supply
- In office 31 October 1951 – 19 October 1954
- Prime Minister: Winston Churchill
- Preceded by: George Strauss
- Succeeded by: Selwyn Lloyd
Shadow Cabinet positions
Shadow Secretary of State for the Colonies
In office 16 October 1964 – 13 April 1966
Leader	Alec Douglas-Home; Edward Heath
Shadowing	Anthony Greenwood; The Earl of Longford; Frederick Lee

Member of Parliament for Streatham
- In office 23 February 1950 – 8 February 1974
- Preceded by: Sir David Robertson
- Succeeded by: William Shelton

Member of Parliament for Norwood
- In office 14 March 1935 – 15 June 1945
- Preceded by: Sir Walter Greaves-Lord
- Succeeded by: Ronald Chamberlain

Personal details
- Born: Edwin Duncan Sandys; 24 January 1908 Sandford Orcas, Dorset, England
- Died: 26 November 1987 (aged 79) London, England
- Party: Conservative
- Spouses: Diana Churchill (m. 1935; div. 1960) Marie-Claire Schmitt (m. 1962)
- Relations: Winston Churchill (father-in-law); Frederick Hamilton Lister (step-father)
- Children: 4, including Edwina and Laura
- Parent: George John Sandys (father)
- Education: Eton College; Magdalen College, Oxford
- Profession: Diplomat

Military service
- Allegiance: United Kingdom
- Branch/service: British Army
- Years of service: 1937–1946
- Rank: Lieutenant-Colonel
- Unit: Royal Artillery
- Battles/wars: Norwegian campaign

Duncan Edwin Duncan-Sandys, Baron Duncan-Sandys CH, PC (/sændz/; 24 January 1908 – 26 November 1987), was a British politician and minister in successive Conservative governments in the 1950s and 1960s. He was a son-in-law of Winston Churchill and played a key role in promoting European unity after World War II.

== Early life ==
Sandys, born on 24 January 1908 at the Manor House, Sandford Orcas, Dorset, was the son of George John Sandys, a Conservative Member of Parliament (1910–1918), and Mildred Helen Cameron. Sandys's parents divorced in January 1921 when he was 12 years old. His mother married Frederick Hamilton Lister in October that year, becoming Mildred Helen Lister. He was educated at Eton College and Magdalen College, Oxford.

== Early career ==
Sandys entered the diplomatic service in 1930, serving at the Foreign Office in London as well as at the embassy in Berlin.

He became Conservative Party Member of Parliament (MP) for Norwood in south London in a by-election in March 1935, at which he was opposed by an Independent Conservative candidate sponsored by Randolph Churchill.

In May 1935, he was in effect saying that Germany should have a predominant place in central Europe, so that Britain could be free to pursue her colonial interests without a rival. He was a prewar member of the Anglo-German Fellowship.

In November 1936, Sandys put forward to the "1912 Club" a "fanciful vision" of England in 1950 (including peace in Europe).

=== The Duncan Sandys case ===
In 1937, Sandys was commissioned into the 51st (London) Anti-Aircraft Brigade, Royal Artillery, of the Territorial Army (TA). In 1938, he asked questions in the House of Commons on matters of national security that reflected his TA experience. He was subsequently approached by two unidentified men, presumably representing the secret services, and threatened with prosecution under section 6 of the Official Secrets Act 1920. Sandys reported the matter to the Committee of Privileges, which held that the disclosures of Parliament were not subject to the legislation, though an MP could be disciplined by the House. The Official Secrets Act 1939 was enacted in reaction to this incident.

== Wartime career ==
During the Second World War, Sandys fought with 51st (London) HAA Regiment in the Norwegian campaign. In April 1941, he suffered injuries to his feet in a motoring accident; this left him with a permanent limp.

His father-in-law gave him his first ministerial post as Financial Secretary to the War Office from 1941 to 1944 during the wartime coalition government. Sandys had been wartime Parliamentary Secretary to the Minister of Supply. (Note: W. A. Robotham, who had been given a position in the Ministry as "Chief Engineer of Tank Design" following his success at head of development of the Meteor tank engine, was surprised and pleased when in 1963 Sandys said, "I regard the adoption of the Meteor tank engine as the absolute turning-point in the history of British tank development", at the opening of a Rolls-Royce aero engine factory at East Kilbride (aero engines being Rolls-Royce's main business).)

From 1944 to 1945, he served as Minister of Works for the remainder of the coalition and in the Churchill caretaker ministry. While a minister, he was chairman of a War Cabinet Committee for defence against German flying bombs and rockets, on which he frequently clashed with the scientist and intelligence expert R. V. Jones. However, he lost his seat in the 1945 general election. He resigned his TA commission as a lieutenant-colonel the following year.

== Co-founder of the European Movement ==
Sandys played a key role in the creation of the European Movement. He established the United Europe Movement in Britain in 1947 following a speech of his father-in-law, Winston Churchill, in Zurich on 19 September 1946 when Churchill had called for the "European family" to be recreated and provided with "a structure under which it can dwell in peace, in safety and in freedom".

In 1947, Joseph Retinger, who had been instrumental in setting up the European League for Economic Cooperation in 1946, approached Sandys, then Honorary Secretary of the UEM, to discuss ways the League and the United Europe Movement might cooperate on questions relating to European integration. They decided to call a small conference of existing organisations working for European unity – the European League for Economic Cooperation, the United Europe Movement, the Nouvelles Equipes Internationales, the European Parliamentary Union, and the European Union of Federalists. This took place in Paris on 20 July 1947 where ELEC, the UEM, the EPU and the EUF agreed to establish the Committee for the Co-ordination of the International Movements for European Unity. The EPU did not however subsequently ratify its participation in the committee but the Nouvelles Equipes Internationales agreed to join. In December 1947, the committee was renamed the International Committee of the Movements for European Unity and Sandys was elected its chairman and Retinger its Honorary Secretary.

The Committee organised the Congress of Europe, held in The Hague from 7–11 May 1948 with 750 delegates from across Europe. Following the Congress, the International Committee was transformed into the European Movement.

Sandys served as a member of the Consultative Assembly of the Council of Europe from 1950 until 1951.

== Post-war parliamentary career ==
Sandys was elected to parliament once again at the 1950 general election for Streatham and, when the Conservatives regained power in 1951, he was appointed Minister of Supply. For most of his time in that role, his private secretary was Jack Charles. As Minister of Housing from 1954, he introduced the Clean Air Act and in 1955 introduced the green belts.

He was appointed Minister of Defence in 1957 and quickly produced the 1957 Defence White Paper that proposed a radical shift in the Royal Air Force by ending the use of fighter aircraft in favour of missile technology. Though later ministers reversed the policy, the lost orders and cuts in research were responsible for several British aircraft manufacturers going out of business. As Minister of Defence, he saw the rationalisation (merger) of much of the British military aircraft and engine industry.

Sandys continued as a minister at the Commonwealth Relations Office, later combining it with the Colonies Office, until the Conservative government lost power in 1964. In this role he was responsible for granting several colonies their independence and was involved in managing the British response to several conflicts involving the armed forces of the newly independent countries of East Africa.

He remained in the shadow cabinet until 1966, when he was sacked by Edward Heath. He had strongly supported Ian Smith in the dispute over Rhodesia's Unilateral Declaration of Independence. He was not offered a post when the Conservatives won the 1970 general election, but instead served as leader of the United Kingdom delegation to the Council of Europe and Western European Union until 1972 when he announced his retirement. The next year he was made a member of the Order of the Companions of Honour.

In 1974, he retired from parliament and was awarded a life peerage on 2 May. As the title of Baron Sandys was already held by another family, he followed the example of George Brown and incorporated his first name in his title, changing his surname to Duncan-Sandys. He was created Baron Duncan-Sandys, of the City of Westminster, on 2 May 1974.

He was an active early member of the Conservative Monday Club.

== Personal life ==
In 1935, Sandys married Diana Churchill, daughter of the future prime minister Winston Churchill. They divorced in 1960.

In 1962, he married Marie-Claire (née Schmitt), who had been previously married to Robert Hudson, 2nd Viscount Hudson. The marriage lasted until Sandys's death.

It has long been speculated that he may have been the "headless man" whose identity was concealed during the scandalous divorce trial of Margaret Campbell, Duchess of Argyll, in 1963.

Sandys died on 26 November 1987 at his home in London. He is buried in the churchyard of St Nicholas in Child Okeford, Dorset. His grave is marked by a horizontal white slab.

== Children ==
From Sandys's first marriage, with Diana Churchill:

- The Hon. Julian Sandys (19 September 1936 – 15 August 1997)
- The Hon. Edwina Sandys (born 22 December 1938)
- The Hon. Celia Sandys (born 18 May 1943). She married firstly Michael Kennedy and secondly Dennis Walters (divorced 1979).

From his second marriage, with Marie-Claire Schmitt:

- The Hon. Laura Sandys (born 5 June 1964). She was a Conservative Member of Parliament for South Thanet.

== Interests ==
Among Sandys's other interests was historic architecture. He formed the Civic Trust in 1957 and was its president; the Royal Institution of British Architects made him an honorary Fellow in 1968, and the Royal Town Planning Institute made him an honorary member. He was also a trustee of the World Security Trust.

Between 1969 and 1984, he was president of Europa Nostra and acted for the preservation of the European cultural and architectural heritage.

His business activities included a directorship of the Ashanti Goldfields Corporation, which was later part of Lonrho of which he became chairman. He was, therefore, caught up in the scandal in which Lonrho was revealed to have bribed several African countries and broken international sanctions against Rhodesia, as well as the "unpleasant and unacceptable face of capitalism" episode involving eight directors being sacked by Tiny Rowland.

== Career summary ==
- Coalition Government
  - 20 July 1941 – 7 February 1943, Financial Secretary to the War Office
  - 7 February 1943 – 21 November 1944, Parliamentary Secretary, Ministry of Supply
  - 21 November 1944 – 25 May 1945, Minister of Works
- Caretaker Government
  - 25 May 1945 – 26 July 1945, Minister of Works
- Conservative Government
  - 31 October 1951 – 18 October 1954, Minister of Supply
  - 18 October 1954 – 13 January 1957, Minister of Housing and Local Government
  - 13 January 1957 – 14 October 1959, Minister of Defence
  - 14 October 1959 – 27 July 1960, Minister of Aviation
  - 27 July 1960 – 13 July 1962, Secretary of State for Commonwealth Relations
  - 13 July 1962 – 16 October 1964, Secretary of State for the Colonies and Commonwealth Relations

== Notes ==
Parliament of the United Kingdom
Preceded by Sir Walter Greaves-Lord	Member of Parliament for Norwood; 1935–1945	Succeeded by Ronald Chamberlain
Preceded by Sir David Robertson	Member of Parliament for Streatham; 1950 – Feb 1974	Succeeded by William Shelton
Political offices
Preceded by Antony Head	Minister of Defence; 1957–1959	Succeeded by Harold Watkinson
New office	Minister of Aviation; 1959–1960	Succeeded by Peter Thorneycroft
Preceded by Alec Douglas-Home	Secretary of State for Commonwealth Relations; 1960–1964	Succeeded by Arthur Bottomley
Preceded by Reginald Maudling	Secretary of State for the Colonies; 1962–1964	Succeeded by Anthony Greenwood
