= Margaret McKay =

British trade unionist and politician

- McKay in 1951

Member of Parliament for Clapham
- In office 15 October 1964 – 29 May 1970
- Prime Minister: Harold Wilson
- Preceded by: Alan Glyn
- Succeeded by: William Shelton

Personal details
- Born: Margaret McCarthy; 22 January 1907 Oswaldtwistle, Lancashire, England
- Died: 1 March 1996 (aged 89) Abu Dhabi, United Arab Emirates
- Party: Labour

Margaret McKay (née McCarthy; 22 January 1907 – 1 March 1996) was a British Labour Party Member of Parliament for Clapham from 1964 to 1970.

== Early life ==
Despite later assertions that McKay was born in 1911, she was in fact born on 22 January 1907 at Oswaldtwistle, Lancashire, a daughter of Joseph and Betsy Ann (Catlow) McCarthy.

== Career ==
McKay's family moved to New Bedford, Massachusetts in her youth, but then returned to England. McKay joined the Independent Labour Party's Guild of Youth, then the Young Communist League, graduating to the Communist Party of Great Britain. She left the party in 1932, joining the Labour Party, and became active in the Socialist League, a left-wing pressure group within the party, serving as its general secretary from 1936 until it was dissolved the following year. She also became general secretary of the National Union of Domestic Workers, a national organiser for the Transport and General Workers' Union, and Trades Union Congress Women's Officer (1951–1962).

After holding various trade union posts, McKay stood unsuccessfully for Labour in Walthamstow East at the 1959 general election. At the 1964 general election, she defeated the sitting Conservative MP Alan Glyn for Clapham, taking the seat with a majority of only 556. At the 1966 election she increased her majority to over 4,000 against the Conservative Ian Gow, but she stood down at the 1970 general election, when the seat was won by the Conservative William Shelton.

Following the 1967 Arab-Israeli War McKay was the first MP to raise the issue of the Palestinian refugees. She established the Anglo-Jordanian Alliance (AJA) in Parliament. In 1970 she approached Sheikh Zayed of the United Arab Republic for funds to launch a PR campaign to improve British perception of the Arab World. Zayed agreed to make a donation of £40,000 with plans to buy property in central London. This ended in a failed attempt to buy a former finishing school for debutants, The Monkey Club, Pont Street. She was not liked by the press which represented her as politically naive with the setting up of a Palestinian refugee camp in Parliament Square and appearing in Parliament wearing a traditional Palestinian women's thowb. There were accusations of mismanagement of the money.

Her views led to criticism from with the Labour Party leadership. She received a warning from the Chief Whip and the leader of the Parliamentary Labour Party over her remarking that 62 Jewish MPs made it impossible for the Government to be anything but pro Israel. In 1969 the AJA published a four page advertisement in The Times. It was head-lined "The Tragic Arab Israeli War, 5 June 1967. Second Anniversary". It was signed by McKay and four other MPs. Her local Clapham Labour Party Branch disassociated themselves from the advert. Ultimately she was deselected.

McKay retired to Abu Dhabi where she received a pension from Sheikh Yazid. At one stage her Parliamentary pension was withheld. She died there on 1 March 1996. She is buried at Sas Al Nakhl cemetery.

Jordan issued a postage stamp in her honour.

Parliament of the United Kingdom
Preceded by Alan Glyn	Member of Parliament for Clapham; 1964–1970	Succeeded by William Shelton
Party political offices
Preceded by J. T. Murphy	General Secretary of the Socialist League; 1936–1937	Succeeded by Position abolished
Trade union offices
Preceded by Nancy Adam	Woman Officer of the Trades Union Congress; 1951–1962	Succeeded by Ethel Chipchase
