= 1939 Streatham by-election =

UK Parliamentary by-election

The 1939 Streatham by-election was held on 7 December 1939. The by-election was held due to the resignation of the incumbent Conservative MP, William Lane-Mitchell. It was won by the Conservative candidate David Robertson.

1939 Streatham by-election
Party	Candidate	Votes	%	±%
Conservative	David Robertson	Unopposed		
Registered electors				
Conservative hold				
