= Edward Samuel Norris =

Edward Samuel Norris (17 October 1832 – 22 February 1908) was an English manufacturer and Conservative Party politician.

Norris was the son of Samuel Edward Norris of Upper Clapton, Middlesex. He was educated at Leatherhead Grammar School. He became a merchant and a manufacturer of leather products for use in machinery and was a Director and Deputy Chairman of Southampton Dock Company. His work for public charities included acting as treasurer of the Merchant Seamen's Orphan Asylum, and of the East London Hospital for Children, and as a trustee for various charities. He was Captain commanding the 2nd Sussex Artillery Volunteers. His writings included A Short History of the Curriers' Co. and various political pamphlets.

In 1885 Norris was elected Member of Parliament for Limehouse. He lost the seat in 1892.

Norris died at the age of 75.

Norris married firstly in 1861, Mary Cole, who died in 1867. He married secondly in 1869 to Anne Amelia Wohlgemuth. He lived at Hurst Dene, Hastings and at 24, Chester Terrace, Regent's Park,

Parliament of the United Kingdom
| New constituency | Member of Parliament for Limehouse; 1885 – 1892 | Succeeded by John Wallace |
