= Streatham (UK Parliament constituency) =

Parliamentary constituency in the United Kingdom, 1918-2024

Coordinates: 51.439°N 0.125°W

- Former borough constituency for the House of Commons
- Boundary of Streatham in Greater London for the 2010 general election
- County: Greater London
- Electorate: 71,913 (December 2010)
- Major settlements: Clapham Common, Streatham Hill, Brixton Hill, Streatham South

1918–2024
- Seats: One
- Created from: Wandsworth
- Replaced by: Clapham and Brixton Hill, Streatham and Croydon North

Streatham was a constituency (Note: A borough constituency (for the purposes of election expenses and type of returning officer)) represented in the House of Commons of the UK Parliament.

In the 2016 EU referendum, Streatham was estimated to have voted to remain in the European Union by 79%. This was the second highest remain vote in the United Kingdom, behind Vauxhall.

Further to the completion of the 2023 review of Westminster constituencies, the seat was abolished. The four southern wards, comprising the town of Streatham, were included in the new constituency of Streatham and Croydon North. Northern areas (Brixton Hill, Clapham Common, Thornton, and Tulse Hill) form part of the new constituency of Clapham and Brixton Hill.

== Boundaries and boundary changes ==
Dates	Local authority	Maps	Wards
1918–1974	Metropolitan Borough of Wandsworth (before 1965); London Borough of Lambeth (after 1965)		Streatham
1974–1983	London Borough of Lambeth		Clapham Park, St Leonard's, Streatham Hill, Streatham South, Streatham Wells, and Thornton
1983–1997	London Borough of Lambeth		Clapham Park, St Leonard's, Streatham Hill, Streatham South, Streatham Wells, Thornton, and Town Hall.
1997–2010	London Borough of Lambeth		Clapham Park, St Leonard's, St Martin's, Streatham Hill, Streatham South, Streatham Wells, Thornton, Town Hall, and Tulse Hill.
2010–2024	London Borough of Lambeth		Brixton Hill, Clapham Common, St Leonard's, Streatham Hill, Streatham South, Streatham Wells, Thornton, and Tulse Hill.

Map of boundaries 2010-2024

Context of (local gov. cllr. divisions) Wards as at 1916.
Context of 1945. Blue central, longer north-south area.
Context of Oct. 1974. As modified.

=== 1918–1974 ===
The constituency was formed primarily from the existing of constituency Wandsworth

=== 1974–1983 ===
Clapham Park and Thornton were transferred from the abolished constituency of Clapham. The wards of Streatham Park and Furzedown ward were transferred to the constituency of Tooting.

=== 1983–1997 ===
The Town Hall ward was transferred from the abolished constituency of Lambeth Central.

=== 1997–2010 ===
The St Martin's and Tulse Hill wards were transferred from the abolished constituency of Norwood.

=== 2010–2024 ===
The wards of Coldharbour, Herne Hill and Thurlow Park were transferred to the constituency of Dulwich and West Norwood.

=== Summary ===
Streatham was a long constituency comprising the south-west portion of the London Borough of Lambeth. The town of Streatham constituted the four wards in the southern half of the constituency. At its north-western tip the seat included half of Clapham Common; the north-east takes in part of Brixton which was shared with neighbouring Vauxhall and Dulwich and West Norwood.

The northern boundary followed Clapham Park Road, Acre Lane, and Coldharbour Lane through Clapham and Brixton to Lambeth Town Hall. The north-eastern boundary generally followed Effra Road and Tulse Hill, but ran east of the main road to include the part of the Tulse Hill estate and the Cressingham Gardens estate west of Brockwell Park. The boundary skirted the Tulse Hill district centre, following Hardel Rise, Christchurch Road and Norwood Road, and then ran along Leigham Vale and Leigham Court Road. The southern and western constituency boundaries followed Lambeth's borough boundaries with Croydon, Merton and Wandsworth.

=== Historic boundaries ===
The constituency of Streatham was contested under this name at the 1918 general election, when it approximately followed the historic parish boundaries of Streatham, including a substantial part of Balham, a 19th-century founded and primarily urban parish by that time.

The constituency was carved out of the former constituency of Wandsworth in the same way as Putney, Wandsworth Central and Balham and Tooting under the Representation of the People Act 1918, the fourth major UK reform, that settled upon single member constituencies, and roughly equal electorates.

The 1918 boundaries remained unchanged until the 1965 changes to Greater London local government became reflected in the parliamentary constituencies, at the February 1974 general election. This resulted in a net reduction in the size of the area. The western district Streatham Park (location of the Streatham Conservative Club) and the remainder of Furzedown ward went into the Tooting seat.

The rest of the constituency, including the town of Streatham has since 1965 been in the London Borough of Lambeth. Three other constituencies covered Lambeth from 1974, Vauxhall, Norwood and Lambeth Central. The Clapham constituency was abolished as part of the 1974 changes. The Clapham Park area and Hyde Farm (commonly thought of as part of Balham) came into the Streatham seat, whereas the rest of Clapham went into the Vauxhall seat creating an enduring split.

On abolition of Lambeth Central at the 1983 election, the constituency gained much of southern Brixton. Following further population decline, Lambeth was paired with Southwark in the next boundary review, and from the 1997 election, Streatham constituency gained areas around Tulse Hill from the former Norwood constituency, the rest of which became part of Dulwich and West Norwood.

== History ==
=== Local government results ===
The constituency shared boundaries with the Streatham electoral division for election of councillors to the Greater London Council at elections in 1973, 1977 and 1981.

The local government wards in the constituency are currently represented by 20 Labour councillors, 1 Conservative councillor and 3 Green councillors, including Jonathan Bartley, the leader of the opposition on Lambeth Council, and former London MEP Scott Ainslie.

Nine Liberal Democrat councillors previously represented the wards of Streatham Hill, Streatham Wells and St Leonard's, with one additional councillor elected for Clapham Common in 2010. All Streatham wards had been represented by the Liberal Democrats from 1990 to 2014, before Labour subsequently gained seven seats from them at the 2014 council elections. The Liberal Democrats were unsuccessful in gaining any seats back at the 2018 local elections. In a 2019 Thornton Ward by-election, the Lib Dems came within 19 votes of winning the seat.

In 2018, the Conservatives held one seat and lost two to Labour in Clapham Common by a very narrow margin, whilst the Greens took the other two seats from Labour in St Leonard's.

=== Political history ===
Streatham was for a few decades solidly Tory suburbia overall: the Conservatives won Streatham when Labour gained large majorities in 1945 and 1966, and it was the only seat in the former LCC area (Inner London) apart from the Chelsea/Kensington/Westminster/City central core to remain consistently Conservative. More recently, demographic and voting pattern changes combined with unfavourable boundary changes converted Streatham into a marginal seat, then into a mid-ranking safe Labour seat.

Streatham has modestly swung against the Conservative Party since the 1980s, even more than other similar seats in South London (such as Croydon North, Dulwich and West Norwood, Lewisham East and West).

The Conservative Party lost Streatham in 1992, despite winning the general election that year with a small majority, having held it since 1918. The Conservative candidate was beaten into third place by a Liberal Democrat in 2001, and there were swings from Labour to the Liberal Democrats at the two subsequent general elections. In 2010, when the Labour incumbent, Keith Hill, retired and Chuka Umunna stood for the party, there was a serious Liberal Democrat campaign resulting in their best showing to date in the seat, but there was also a marginal increase in the Conservative vote share and Umunna was elected. The 2015 result was the re-election of Umunna, which made the seat the 96th safest of Labour's 232 seats by percentage of majority.

In 2015 the Conservatives moved into second place with a sharp increase in numerical vote share, and remained there in 2017. However, in 2019, they reverted to third place behind the Liberal Democrats.

=== 2016 European Union referendum ===
In the 2016 referendum on European Union membership, Streatham is estimated to have posted the highest proportion of support for Remain of any constituency, at 79.5%.

== Constituency profile ==
Among the most ethnically diverse constituencies, Streatham - which covered parts of Clapham, Brixton, Tulse Hill and Streatham itself - was in the south London borough of Lambeth. Only 58.2% of residents were white and it had among the most mixed race and black residents in the country, according to the 2011 Census. It also had Polish, Portuguese and Hispanic communities.

The bulk of residents were aged 25–44, with relatively few pensioners. Although it is a residential area, it is more popular with young workers than families, having good transport links into central London. Many residents rent, and there is a large social housing sector. Commercially, Streatham High Road is home to over 400 businesses, whilst a £26m ice rink and leisure centre opened in November 2013, part of continuing investment. The population is highly qualified and a high percentage are in full-time work.

As of 2016, at just over 6% of the population, Streatham (which is located in the London Borough of Lambeth), had the largest proportion of LGBT+ people in the country.

== Members of Parliament ==
Election	Member	Party	Notes
1918	Sir William Lane-Mitchell	Coalition Conservative	Sat as a Unionist
1922	Sir William Lane-Mitchell	Conservative	Sat as a Unionist
1939 by-election	Sir David Robertson	Conservative	Uncontested wartime by-election caused by Lane-Mitchell's resignation
1950	Duncan Sandys	Conservative	
1974	Sir William Shelton	Conservative	
1992	Keith Hill	Labour	
2010	Chuka Umunna	Labour	Defected to Change UK, then Liberal Democrats, in 2019
February 2019	Chuka Umunna	Change UK	Defected to Change UK, then Liberal Democrats, in 2019
June 2019	Chuka Umunna	Liberal Democrats	Defected to Change UK, then Liberal Democrats, in 2019
2019	Bell Ribeiro-Addy	Labour	
2024	constituency abolished: see Clapham and Brixton Hill and Streatham and Croydon North		

== Elections ==
=== Elections in the 2010s ===
17% was the largest vote share increase in a Labour held seat for the Liberal Democrats at the 2019 general election.

General election 2019: Streatham
Party	Candidate	Votes	%	±%
Labour	Bell Ribeiro-Addy	30,976	54.8	−13.7
Liberal Democrats	Helen Thompson	13,286	23.5	+17.0
Conservative	Rory O'Broin	9,060	16.0	−5.4
Green	Scott Ainslie	2,567	4.5	+1.5
Brexit Party	Penelope Becker	624	1.1	New
Majority		17,690	31.3	−15.8
Turnout		56,513	66.7	−4.2
Registered electors		84,783		
Labour hold		Swing		

General election 2017: Streatham
Party	Candidate	Votes	%	±%
Labour	Chuka Umunna	38,212	68.5	+15.5
Conservative	Kim Caddy	11,927	21.4	−3.7
Liberal Democrats	Alexander Davies	3,611	6.5	−2.5
Green	Nicole Griffiths	1,696	3.0	−5.8
UKIP	Robert Stephenson	349	0.6	−2.6
Majority		26,285	47.1	+19.2
Turnout		55,795	70.9	+7.8
Registered electors		78,649		
Labour hold		Swing	+9.6	

General election 2015: Streatham
Party	Candidate	Votes	%	±%
Labour	Chuka Umunna	26,474	53.0	+10.2
Conservative	Kim Caddy	12,540	25.1	+6.8
Liberal Democrats	Amna Ahmad	4,491	9.0	−26.8
Green	Jonathan Bartley	4,421	8.9	+7.0
UKIP	Bruce Machan	1,602	3.2	New
CISTA	Artificial Beast	192	0.4	New
TUSC	Unjum Mirza	164	0.3	New
Workers Revolutionary	Deon Gayle	49	0.1	−0.1
Majority		13,934	27.9	+20.9
Turnout		49,933	63.1	+0.3
Registered electors		79,137		
Labour hold		Swing	+1.7	

General election 2010: Streatham
Party	Candidate	Votes	%	±%
Labour	Chuka Umunna	20,037	42.8	−4.0
Liberal Democrats	Chris Nicholson	16,778	35.8	+6.2
Conservative	Rahoul Bhansali	8,578	18.3	+1.8
Green	Rebecca Findlay	861	1.8	−3.5
Christian	Geoffrey Macharia	237	0.5	New
English Democrat	Janus Polenceus	229	0.5	New
Workers Revolutionary	Paul Lepper	117	0.2	−0.2
Majority		3,259	7.0	−11.2
Turnout		46,837	62.8	+11.5
Registered electors		74,532		
Labour hold		Swing	−5.1	

=== Elections in the 2000s ===
2005 notional result
Party	Vote	%
Labour	17,571	46.8
Liberal Democrats	11,137	29.6
Conservative	6,219	16.6
Green	2,016	5.4
Others	626	1.7
Turnout	37,569	51.3
Electorate	73,232	

General election 2005: Streatham
Party	Candidate	Votes	%	±%
Labour	Keith Hill	18,950	46.7	−10.6
Liberal Democrats	Darren Sanders	11,484	28.3	+10.2
Conservative	James Sproule	7,238	17.8	−0.0
Green	Shane Collins	2,245	5.5	+1.1
UKIP	Trevor Gittings	396	1.0	New
Workers Revolutionary	Billy Colvill	127	0.3	New
Independent	Philippa Stone	100	0.2	New
Independent	Robert West	40	0.1	New
Independent	Sarah Acheng	35	0.1	New
Majority		7,466	18.4	−20.8
Turnout		40,615	51.3	+2.2
Registered electors		79,193		
Labour hold		Swing	−10.1	

General election 2001: Streatham
Party	Candidate	Votes	%	±%
Labour	Keith Hill	21,401	57.3	−5.5
Liberal Democrats	Roger O'Brien	6,771	18.1	+4.6
Conservative	Stephen Hocking	6,639	17.8	−4.0
Green	Mohammed Sajid	1,641	4.4	New
Socialist Alliance	Greg Tucker	906	2.4	New
Majority		14,630	39.2	−1.9
Turnout		37,358	49.1	−11.0
Registered electors		76,021		
Labour hold		Swing	−5.0	

=== Elections in the 1990s ===
General election 1997: Streatham
Party	Candidate	Votes	%	±%
Labour	Keith Hill	28,181	62.8	+13.4
Conservative	Ernest Noad	9,758	21.7	−16.7
Liberal Democrats	Roger O'Brien	6,082	13.6	+3.6
Referendum	Jeremy Wall	864	1.9	New
Majority		18,423	41.0	+30.1
Turnout		44,885	60.2	−9.9
Registered electors		74,583		
Labour hold		Swing	+15.0	

1992 notional result
Party	Vote	%
Labour	24,585	49.4
Conservative	19,114	38.4
Liberal Democrats	4,966	10.0
Others	1,107	2.2
Turnout	49,772	70.1
Electorate	71,008	

General election 1992: Streatham
Party	Candidate	Votes	%	±%
Labour	Keith Hill	18,925	47.0	+7.8
Conservative	Bill Shelton	16,608	41.3	−3.7
Liberal Democrats	John Pindar	3,858	9.6	−6.2
Green	Roger Baker	443	1.1	New
Islamic Party	A. Hakin	154	0.4	New
Rainbow Dream Ticket	Cynthia Payne	145	0.4	New
Natural Law	John Parsons	97	0.2	New
Majority		2,317	5.8	N/A
Turnout		40,230	70.8	+1.3
Registered electors		56,825		
Labour gain from Conservative		Swing	+5.7	

=== Elections in the 1980s ===
General election 1987: Streatham
Party	Candidate	Votes	%	±%
Conservative	Bill Shelton	18,916	44.9	−1.6
Labour	E. Anna Tapsall	16,509	39.2	+7.7
Liberal	Mike Tuffrey	6,663	15.8	−5.4
Majority		2,407	5.7	−9.3
Turnout		42,088	69.5	+4.1
Registered electors		60,519		
Conservative hold		Swing	+4.7	

General election 1983: Streatham
Party	Candidate	Votes	%	±%
Conservative	Bill Shelton	18,264	46.5	−3.1
Labour	Madeline Long	12,362	31.5	−7.3
Liberal	Peter Billenness	8,321	21.2	+11.5
National Front	K. D. Handy	321	0.8	−1.1
Majority		5,902	15.0	+4.2
Turnout		39,268	65.4	
Registered electors		60,032		
Conservative hold		Swing	+2.1	

=== Elections in the 1970s ===
1979 notional result
Party	Vote	%
Conservative	22,219	49.6
Labour	17,386	38.8
Liberal	4,343	9.7
Others	874	1.9
Turnout	44,822	
Electorate		

General election 1979: Streatham
Party	Candidate	Votes	%	±%
Conservative	Bill Shelton	19,630	51.4	+5.8
Labour	Timothy Daniel	14,130	37.0	−0.7
Liberal	John Pincham	3,779	9.9	−3.9
National Front	George Bryant	523	1.4	−0.9
Providers Through Care	Alf Hollander	102	0.3	New
Majority		5,500	14.4	+6.5
Turnout		38,164	71.5	+7.5
Registered electors		53,347		
Conservative hold		Swing	+3.2	

General election October 1974: Streatham
Party	Candidate	Votes	%	±%
Conservative	Bill Shelton	16,515	45.7	+0.5
Labour	Jean Gaffin	13,648	37.7	+3.5
Liberal	Robert Silver	4,987	13.8	−4.5
National Front	Tom Lamb	817	2.3	±0.0
Independent	Teresa Moore	210	0.6	New
Majority		2,867	7.9	−3.0
Turnout		36,177	64.1	−8.7
Registered electors		56,453		
Conservative hold		Swing	−1.5	

General election February 1974: Streatham
Party	Candidate	Votes	%	±%
Conservative	Bill Shelton	18,457	45.2	−12.3
Labour	Jean Gaffin	13,982	34.2	−0.3
Liberal	Robert Silver	7,456	18.2	+10.2
National Front	Tom Lamb	937	2.3	New
Independent	Bill Boaks	45	0.1	New
Majority		4,475	10.9	−11.9
Turnout		40,877	72.8	+7.6
Registered electors		56,166		
Conservative hold		Swing	−6.0	

1970 notional result
Party	Vote	%
Conservative	22,100	57.4
Labour	13,300	34.5
Liberal	3,100	8.1
Turnout	38,500	65.2
Electorate	59,032	

General election 1970: Streatham
Party	Candidate	Votes	%	±%
Conservative	Duncan Sandys	19,215	54.1	−0.5
Labour	Ann Ward	13,593	38.3	−7.1
Liberal	Derrick Delaney	2,680	7.6	New
Majority		5,622	15.8	+6.6
Turnout		35,488	66.7	−3.7
Registered electors		53,205		
Conservative hold		Swing	+3.3	

=== Elections in the 1960s ===
General election 1966: Streatham
Party	Candidate	Votes	%	±%
Conservative	Duncan Sandys	19,872	54.6	+2.5
Labour	James Walker	16,505	45.4	+12.9
Majority		3,367	9.3	−10.4
Turnout		36,377	70.4	−1.4
Registered electors		51,668		
Conservative hold		Swing	−5.2	

General election 1964: Streatham
Party	Candidate	Votes	%	±%
Conservative	Duncan Sandys	19,408	52.1	−7.7
Labour	James Walker	12,085	32.4	+5.0
Liberal	Anthony Miller	5,261	14.1	+1.3
Independent Loyalists	William Brooks	497	1.3	New
Majority		7,323	19.7	−12.7
Turnout		37,251	71.8	−5.4
Registered electors		51,910		
Conservative hold		Swing	−6.3	

=== Elections in the 1950s ===
General election 1959: Streatham
Party	Candidate	Votes	%	±%
Conservative	Duncan Sandys	23,479	59.8	−5.8
Labour	David Kerr	10,773	27.4	−7.0
Liberal	Stephen Rubin	5,039	12.8	New
Majority		12,706	32.3	+1.2
Turnout		39,291	77.2	+2.79
Registered electors		50,916		
Conservative hold		Swing	+0.6	

General election 1955: Streatham
Party	Candidate	Votes	%	±%
Conservative	Duncan Sandys	25,862	65.5	+5.6
Labour	Reg Prentice	13,594	34.5	+1.7
Majority		12,268	31.1	+3.9
Turnout		39,456	74.8	−6.7
Registered electors		52,727		
Conservative hold		Swing	+2.0	

General election 1951: Streatham
Party	Candidate	Votes	%	±%
Conservative	Duncan Sandys	27,084	59.9	+2.6
Labour	Norman Smart	14,804	32.7	−0.1
Liberal	Alexander Wilson	3,319	7.3	−2.5
Majority		12,280	27.2	+2.7
Turnout		45,207	81.5	+0.5
Registered electors		55,451		
Conservative hold		Swing	+1.4	

General election 1950: Streatham
Party	Candidate	Votes	%	±%
Conservative	Duncan Sandys	26,571	57.3	+5.1
Labour	Peter Benenson	15,235	32.9	−0.9
Liberal	Alexander Wilson	4,562	9.8	−4.1
Majority		11,336	24.4	+6.0
Turnout		46,368	81.0	+7.6
Registered electors		57,234		
Conservative hold		Swing	+3.0	

=== Elections in the 1940s ===
General election 1945: Streatham
Party	Candidate	Votes	%	±%
Conservative	David Robertson	17,462	52.2	−24.0
Labour	John Gross	11,296	33.8	+10.0
Liberal	Charles Remnant	4,677	14.0	New
Majority		6,166	18.4	−33.9
Turnout		33,435	73.4	+9.3
Registered electors		45,521		
Conservative hold		Swing	−17.0	

=== Elections in the 1930s ===
1939 Streatham by-election
Party	Candidate	Votes	%	±%
Conservative	David Robertson	Unopposed		
Registered electors				
Conservative hold				

General election 1935: Streatham
Party	Candidate	Votes	%	±%
Conservative	William Lane-Mitchell	25,429	76.2	−8.9
Labour	Arthur Skeffington	7,951	23.8	+8.9
Majority		17,478	52.4	−17.7
Turnout		33,280	64.1	−7.2
Registered electors		52,067		
Conservative hold		Swing	+8.9	

General election 1931: Streatham
Party	Candidate	Votes	%	±%
Conservative	William Lane-Mitchell	30,358	85.0	+28.0
Labour	Betty Fraser	5,343	15.0	−3.4
Majority		25,015	70.1	+37.6
Turnout		35,701	71.3	+2.4
Registered electors		50,070		
Conservative hold		Swing	+15.7	

=== Elections in the 1920s ===
General election 1929: Streatham
Party	Candidate	Votes	%	±%
Unionist	William Lane-Mitchell	19,024	57.0	−11.5
Liberal	Percy Rawlins	8,191	24.6	+6.9
Labour	Fred Hughes	6,134	18.4	New
Majority		10,833	32.5	−18.4
Turnout		33,349	68.9	−8.8
Registered electors		48,387		
Unionist hold		Swing	−9.2	

General election 1924: Streatham
Party	Candidate	Votes	%	±%
Unionist	William Lane-Mitchell	15,936	68.5	+8.6
Liberal	Charles Parsloe	4,111	17.7	−22.4
Communist	Alfred Wall	3,204	13.8	New
Majority		11,825	50.9	+30.9
Turnout		23,251	77.7	+16.5
Registered electors		29,906		
Unionist hold		Swing	+15.5	

General election 1923: Streatham
Party	Candidate	Votes	%	±%
Unionist	William Lane-Mitchell	10,598	60.0	−9.2
Liberal	Charles Parsloe	7,075	40.0	+9.2
Majority		3,523	19.9	−18.3
Turnout		17,653	61.3	−1.7
Registered electors		28,837		
Unionist hold		Swing	−9.2	

General election 1922: Streatham
Party	Candidate	Votes	%	±%
Unionist	William Lane-Mitchell	12,282	69.1	−3.8
Liberal	O.A. Minns	5,483	30.9	+15.5
Majority		6,799	38.3	−19.2
Turnout		17,765	63.0	+4.5
Registered electors		28,186		
Unionist hold		Swing	−9.6	

=== Elections in the 1910s ===
General election 1918: Streatham
Party		Candidate	Votes	%
C	Unionist	William Lane-Mitchell	11,457	72.9
	Liberal	John Compston	2,417	15.4
	National	F.H. Bellamy	1,844	11.7
Majority			9,040	57.5
Turnout			15,718	58.6
Registered electors			26,842	
	Unionist win (new seat)			
C indicates candidate endorsed by the coalition government.

== See also ==
- Parliamentary constituencies in London

== Sources ==
- Leigh Rayment's Historical List of MPs – Constituencies beginning with "S" (part 5)
