= Anne Gibson, Baroness Gibson of Market Rasen =

British trade unionist (1940–2018)

The Right Honourable The Baroness Gibson of Market Rasen OBE
- Gibson chairing the House of Lords, 2013

Member of the House of Lords
- Lord Temporal
- Life peerage 9 May 2000 – 20 April 2018

Personal details
- Born: 10 December 1940
- Died: 20 April 2018 (aged 77)

Anne Gibson, Baroness Gibson of Market Rasen, OBE (née Tasker; 10 December 1940 – 20 April 2018) was a British trade unionist, Labour life peer and author of several pamphlets about industrial laws.

== Biography ==
The daughter of Harry and Jessie Tasker, she was educated at Market Rasen Junior School and Caistor Grammar School in Lincolnshire. She was further educated at the Chelmsford College of Further Education and the University of Essex, where she graduated with a Bachelor of Arts in government in 1976.

Gibson worked first as secretary from 1956 to 1959 and then as bank cashier until 1966. Between 1966 and 1970, she was organiser for Saffron Walden Labour Party. In 1976 and 1977, she was employed by the House Magazine. From 1977 to 1987, Gibson was assistant secretary of the Organisation and Industrial Relations Department of the Trades Union Congress (TUC) and from 1987 to 2000 national secretary of Manufacturing Science and Finance (MSF). From 1989 to 2000, she was member of the TUC General Council and from 1991 to 1998 of the Equal Opportunities Commission (EOC). Between 1993 and 1996, she was also member of the Department of Employment Advisory Group for Older Workers and between 1996 and 2000 of the Health and Safety Commission. She was a member of AMICUS and of the Emily Pankhurst Trust.

Between 1996 and 2001, she was chair of the European Community Committee on Violence at Work. She was also a member of the Occupational Health and Safety Commission and the Committee on Health and Safety. Gibson was further a member of the Bilbao Agency. She was the president of the Royal Society for the Prevention of Accidents (ROSPA) from 2004 until 2008.

In 1998, she was made an Officer of the Order of the British Empire (OBE) and on 9 May 2000, she became a life peer with the title Baroness Gibson of Market Rasen, of Market Rasen in the County of Lincolnshire. In 2001, she received the Distinguished Service Award for work in health and safety of the Royal Society for the Prevention of Accidents (ROSPA).

In addition, Baroness Gibson was the Honorary President of 2168 (Yeadon) Squadron, Air Training Corps and sat on the Air Cadet Council as a representative of the Air League.

Gibson married twice. In 1962, firstly John Donald Gibson 1962 and in 1988 secondly John Bartell. She had a daughter by her first husband and two grandchildren anď two step grandchildren. She died on 20 April 2018 at the age of 77.

Trade union offices
Preceded by Ethel Chipchase	Women's Officer of the Trades Union Congress; 1980–1987	Succeeded by Kay Carberry
