= Harry Samuel =

British politician

The Right Honourable Sir Harry Samuel
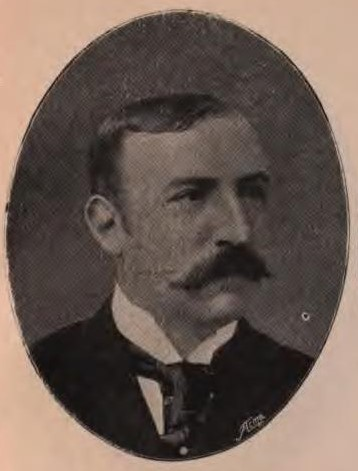

Member of Parliament for Limehouse
- In office 13 July 1895 – 12 January 1906
- Preceded by: John Stewart Wallace
- Succeeded by: William Pearce

Member of Parliament for Norwood
- In office 15 January 1910 – 26 October 1922
- Preceded by: George Bowles
- Succeeded by: Walter Greaves-Lord

Personal details
- Born: Harry Simon Samuel; 3 August 1853 Marylebone, London
- Died: 26 April 1934 (aged 80) Monte Carlo, Monaco
- Resting place: Golders Green Jewish Cemetery
- Party: Conservative
- Spouse: Rose Beddington
- Children: 4
- Education: St John's College, Cambridge
- Occupation: Businessman

Sir Harry Simon Samuel PC (3 August 1853 – 26 April 1934) was an English Member of Parliament for Limehouse and then Norwood in London. He was an advocate of protection in trade and he campaigned against free trade during his political career.

== Biography ==
=== Early life ===
Samuel was born at 40 Gloucester Place near Portman Square in Marylebone, London, the son of Horatio Simon Samuel, a cooper, and Henrietta Montefiore. He was educated at Eastbourne College and then St John's College, Cambridge, where he received a Bachelor of Arts.

=== Career ===
He became a partner in the firm of Montefiore & Company.

=== Politics ===
Samuel retired from business to enter politics with the Unionist party and, in 1889, he became a prospective candidate in St Pancras East. So as not to split the Conservative vote in 1892 Samuel stood in the 1892 election for the Conservative Party in the Limehouse constituency but the seat was won by the Liberal Party candidate, John Stewart Wallace, with a majority of 270.

In the 1895, he stood again and was elected as Member of Parliament for Limehouse with a majority of 590. During the election campaign he was the subject of Antisemitic comments from his Liberal-Labour opponent William Marcus Thompson. He was re-elected in 1900 with a majority of 538 but lost the seat in 1906 to Liberal William Pearce. In 1903, he had been appointed a Knight Bachelor.

In January 1910, he was elected back to parliament with a 1778 majority in the Norwood constituency, a seat he then held until he retired as an MP at the 1922 election. He was appointed a member of the Privy Council in 1916. He was also a Freeman of the City of London and a member of the Cooper's Company.

=== Personal life ===
In 1878, he married Rose Beddington. They had four children: three sons and one daughter. His daughter Nora married Percy de Worms (1873–1941).

He died in 1934 at Villa Alexandra in Monte Carlo aged 80. His memorial service was held at West London Synagogue.

Parliament of the United Kingdom
| Preceded by John Stewart Wallace | Member of Parliament for Limehouse; 1895–1906 | Succeeded by William Pearce |
| Preceded by George Bowles | Member of Parliament for Norwood; 1910 – 1922 | Succeeded by Walter Greaves-Lord |
