= Tebworth =

Hamlet in Bedfordshire, England

Coordinates: 51.9304°N 0.5603°W

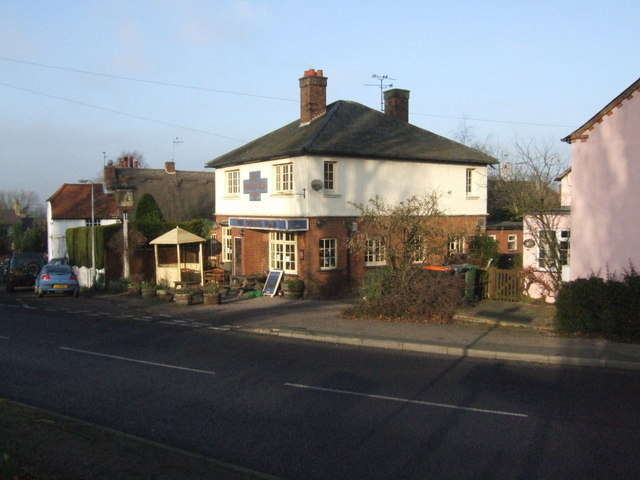
- The Queens Head public house

- Location within Bedfordshire
- OS grid reference: SP990267
- Civil parish: Chalgrave
- Unitary authority: Central Bedfordshire
- Ceremonial county: Bedfordshire
- Region: East
- Country: England
- Sovereign state: United Kingdom
- Post town: LEIGHTON BUZZARD
- Postcode district: LU7
- Dialling code: 01525
- Police: Bedfordshire
- Fire: Bedfordshire
- Ambulance: East of England
- UK Parliament: South West Bedfordshire

Tebworth is a village located in the Central Bedfordshire district of Bedfordshire, England.

The settlement is close to Wingfield and Hockliffe, with the nearest town being Houghton Regis. Amenities in Tebworth include "The Queens Head" pub.

Tebworth is part of the ward of 'Heath and Reach' which sends a Councillor to Central Bedfordshire Council. The ward includes the villages of Heath and Reach, Hockliffe, Eggington, Stanbridge, Tilsworth, Tebworth and Wingrave. The ward was created in 2011 and has since been represented by Councillor Mark Versallion. At the 2011 Census the population of the hamlet was included in the civil parish of Chalgrave.

== Notable residents ==
- Colin Edwynn, actor who appeared in Coronation Street, and Heartbeat, lived in and operated "The Queens Head" pub in Tebworth
- Jack Wild, actor who starred in H.R. Pufnstuf and Oliver!, lived in Tebworth before his death in 2006
