= Wingfield, Bedfordshire =

Hamlet in Bedfordshire, England

Coordinates: 51.9260°N 0.5467°W

Wingfield
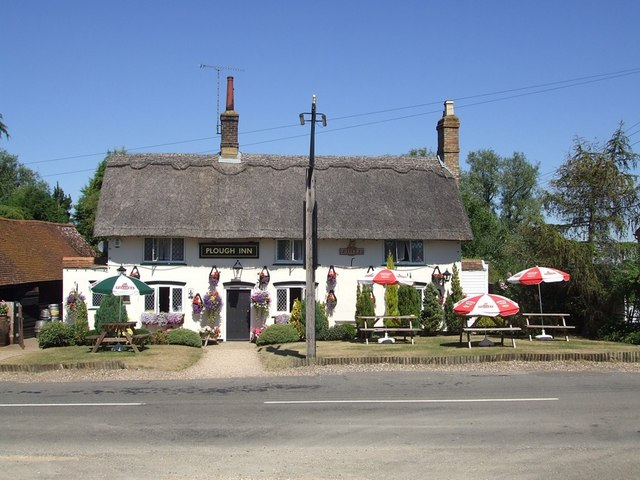
- The Plough Inn public house

- Location within Bedfordshire
- OS grid reference: TL000262
- Civil parish: Chalgrave
- Unitary authority: Central Bedfordshire
- Ceremonial county: Bedfordshire
- Region: East
- Country: England
- Sovereign state: United Kingdom
- Post town: LEIGHTON BUZZARD
- Postcode district: LU7
- Dialling code: 01525
- Police: Bedfordshire
- Fire: Bedfordshire
- Ambulance: East of England
- UK Parliament: South West Bedfordshire

Wingfield is a village located in the Central Bedfordshire district of Bedfordshire, England.

The settlement is close to Tebworth and Chalgrave, with the nearest town being Houghton Regis.

Wingfield forms part of the Chalgrave civil parish, and is home to The Plough Inn public house.

The Icknield Way Path passes through the village on its 110-mile journey from Ivinghoe Beacon in Buckinghamshire to Knettishall Heath in Suffolk. The Icknield Way Trail, a multi-user route for walkers, horse riders and off-road cyclists also passes through the village.

Wingfield is part of the ward of 'Heath and Reach' which sends a Councillor to Central Bedfordshire Council. The ward includes the villages of Heath and Reach, Hockliffe, Eggington, Stanbridge, Tilsworth, Tebworth, and Wingrave. The ward was created in 2011 and has since been represented by Councillor Mark Versallion.
