= Chalgrave =

Civil parish in Bedfordshire, England

Coordinates: 51.9267°N 0.5348°W

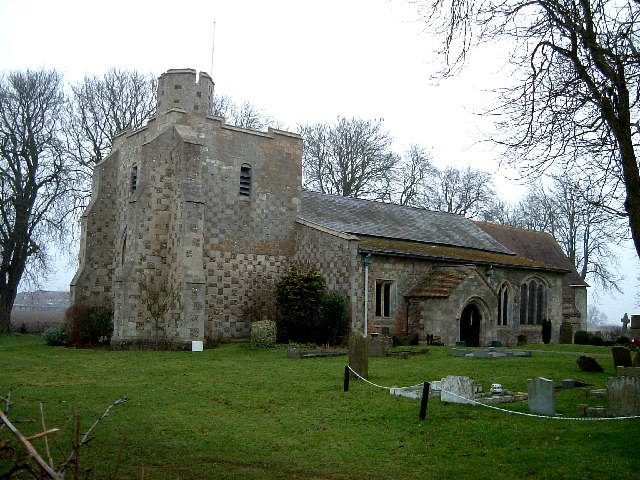
- All Saints church

- Location within Bedfordshire
- Population: 495
- OS grid reference: TL007382
- Unitary authority: Central Bedfordshire
- Ceremonial county: Bedfordshire
- Region: East
- Country: England
- Sovereign state: United Kingdom
- Post town: LUTON
- Postcode district: LU4
- Dialling code: 01525
- Police: Bedfordshire
- Fire: Bedfordshire
- Ambulance: East of England
- UK Parliament: South West Bedfordshire

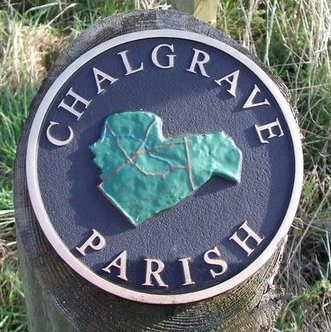
Signpost for Chalgrave Parish

Chalgrave is a civil parish in the Central Bedfordshire district of Bedfordshire, England. The hamlets of Tebworth and Wingfield are in the west of the parish, with the church and manor in the east. Nearby places are Toddington (to the north), Chalton (to the east), Houghton Regis (to the south), and Hockliffe (to the west). Before 1929, the parish also included part of the village of Hockliffe.

Chalgrave is part of the ward of 'Heath and Reach' which sends a Councillor to Central Bedfordshire Council. The ward includes the villages of Heath and Reach, Hockliffe, Eggington, Stanbridge, Tilsworth, Tebworth, and Wingrave. The ward was created in 2011 and has since been represented by Councillor Mark Versallion.

== Origins ==
The name is derived from the Old English 'calc-græf', meaning a chalk trench. A charter dated 926 AD recorded the grant of land at Cealhgraefan (Chalgrave) and Teobbanwyrthe (Tebworth) from Æthelstan, King of the Anglo-Saxons, to the thegn Ealdred. By 1066 it had grown to 23 households and was owned mostly by Albert of Lorraine, who retained it after the Norman Conquest. Albert was a cleric favoured by both Edward the Confessor and William the Conqueror, and received from them lands and houses in Bedfordshire and elsewhere. Chalgrave became the chief seat of the Loring family, who descend from Albert of Lorraine.

== Chalgrave church and manor ==
The location now known as Chalgrave, just south of Toddington, was called East Coten (meaning "east cottages") in the year 926. Here a church and manor house were established on well-drained soil at the top of the hill in the 11th or 12th century. At the beginning of the 13th century the church was rebuilt, and the manorial complex was moved east and then north to what is now Chalgrave Manor Farm.

The Icknield Way Path passes through the village past the church on its 110-mile journey from Ivinghoe Beacon in Buckinghamshire to Knettishall Heath in Suffolk. The Icknield Way Trail, a multi-user route for walkers, horse riders and off-road cyclists also passes through the village.

== Tebworth ==
Tebworth is a small Hamlet 1 mile west of the church, about 4½ miles east of Leighton Buzzard, about 40 miles (64 km) north of London, 1 mile east of Hockliffe, and 2 miles (3 km) south-west of Toddington.

== Wingfield ==
Wingfield is a Hamlet almost 1 mile south-west of the church. Most of the houses are along Tebworth Road, which runs from Tebworth to the top of Lords Hill. Because of the location, there are a few well known people living in the Hamlet. Like Tebworth, it had developed as a settlement by the 13th century.
