= Candidates of the 2024 United Kingdom general election by constituency =

Results of the 2024 United Kingdom general election
- 4 July 2024

The 2024 general election took place on 4 July 2024. Counting began after conclusion of voting at 22:00 the same day and the results for almost all constituencies were declared in the early hours of 5 July. Prime Minister Rishi Sunak's Conservative Party lost over 240 seats and its 14-year long tenure in government. The Labour Party formed a majority government under the leadership of Keir Starmer, winning over 400 seats. Other parties including the Liberal Democrats, Reform UK and the Green Party saw an increase in their seat share in the House of Commons at expense of the Conservatives and the Scottish National Party.

Bold meant the candidate was elected.

== East of England ==
Bold meant the candidate was elected.

Constituency	Conservative	Labour	Liberal Democrats	Reform UK	Green Party	Others	Incumbent	
Basildon and Billericay	Richard Holden	Alex Harrison	Edward Sainsbury	Stephen Conlay	Stewart Goshawk	Christopher Bateman (British Democrats); Dave Murray (Trade Unionist and Socialist Coalition)	Conservative	John Baron
Bedford	Pinder Chauhan	Mohammad Yasin	Henry Vann	Matt Lansley	Ben Foley	Prince Sadiq Chaudhury (Workers Party of Britain); Tarek Javed (Independent)	Labour	Mohammad Yasin
Braintree	James Cleverly	Matthew Wright	Kieron Franks	Richard Thomson	Paul Thorogood	David Heather (Independent)	Conservative	James Cleverly
Brentwood and Ongar	Alex Burghart	Gareth Barrett	David Kendall	Paul Godfrey	Reece Learmouth	Robin Tilbrook (English Democrats)	Conservative	Alex Burghart
Broadland and Fakenham	Jerome Mayhew	Iain Simpson	Leyla Hannbeck	Eric Masters	Jan Davis		Conservative	Jerome Mayhew
Broxbourne	Lewis Cocking	Catherine Deakin	Nicholas Belfitt	Tom Holdsworth	Owen Brett		Conservative	Charles Walker
Bury St Edmunds and Stowmarket	Will Tanner	Peter Prinsley	Peter McDonald	Scott Hussey	Emma Buckmaster	Jeremy Lee (Independent); Darren Turner (CPB)	Conservative	Jo Churchill
Cambridge	Shane Manning	Daniel Zeichner	Cheney Payne		Sarah Nicmanis	Khalid Abu-Tayyem (Workers Party of Britain); David Carmona (Independent); Keith Alexander Garrett (Rebooting Democracy)	Labour	Daniel Zeichner
Castle Point	Rebecca Harris	Mark Maguire	James Willis	Keiron McGill	Bob Chapman		Conservative	Rebecca Harris
Central Suffolk and North Ipswich	Patrick Spencer	Kevin Craig	Brett Mickelburgh	Tony Gould	Dan Pratt	Charlie Caiger (Independent); Mike Hallatt (Independent)	Labour (elected as Conservative)	Dan Poulter
Chelmsford	Vicky Ford	Richard Parry	Marie Goldman	Darren Ingrouille	Reza Hossain	Mark Kenlen (Workers)	Conservative	Vicky Ford
Clacton	Giles Watling	Jovan Owusu-Nepaul	Matthew Bensilum	Nigel Farage	Natasha Osben	Tony Mack (Independent); Andrew Pemberton (UK Independence Party); Craig Jamieson (Climate Party); Tasos Papanastasiou (Heritage Party)	Conservative	Giles Watling
Colchester	James Cracknell	Pam Cox	Martin Goss	Terence Longstaff	Sara Nicola Ruth		Conservative	Will Quince
Dunstable and Leighton Buzzard	Andrew Selous	Alex Mayer	Emma Holland-Lindsay	Harry Palmer	Sukhinder Hundal	Antonio Vitiello (English Democrats)	Conservative	Andrew Selous
Ely and East Cambridgeshire	Lucy Frazer	Elizabeth McWilliams	Charlotte Cane	Ryan Coogan	Andy Cogan	Hoo-Ray Henry (The Official Monster Raving Loony Party); Robert Bayley (Social Democratic Party); Obi Monye (Independent); Rob Rawlins (Independent)	Conservative	Lucy Frazer
Epping Forest	Neil Hudson	Rosalind Doré	Jon Whitehouse	Peter Bell	Simon Heap		Conservative	Eleanor Laing
Great Yarmouth	James Clark	Keir Cozens	Fionna Tod	Rupert Lowe	Trevor Rawson	Catherine Blaiklock (English Democrats); Paul Brown (Independent); Clare Roullier (Independent)	Conservative	Sir Brandon Lewis
Harlow	Hannah Ellis	Chris Vince	Riad Mannan	Malcolm Rider Featherstone	Yasmin Gregory		Conservative	Robert Halfon
Harpenden and Berkhamsted	Nigel Gardner	Zara Layne	Victoria Collins	Saba Poursaeedi	Paul DeHoest	Sina Gharib (Workers)	Conservative	New seat
Harwich and North Essex	Bernard Jenkin	Alex Diner	Natalie Sommers	Mark Cole	Andrew Canessa		Conservative	Bernard Jenkin
Hemel Hempstead	Andrew Williams	David Taylor	Sammy Barry-Mears	Noel Willcox	Sherief Hassan		Conservative	Mike Penning
Hertford and Stortford	Julie Marson	Josh Dean	Helen Campbell	John Burmicz	Nick Cox		Conservative	Julie Marson
Hertsmere	Oliver Dowden	Josh Tapper	Emma Matanle	Darren Selkus	John Humphries		Conservative	Oliver Dowden
Hitchin	Bim Afolami	Alistair Strathern (Note: Strathern was the incumbent MP for Mid Bedfordshire in Bedfordshire since a 2023 by-election, and stood in Hitchin in Hertfordshire.)	Chris Lucas	Charles Bunker	William Lavin		Conservative	Bim Afolami
Huntingdon	Ben Obese-Jecty	Alexandra Bulat	Mark Argent	Sarah Smith	Georgie Hunt		Conservative	Jonathan Djanogly
Ipswich	Tom Hunt	Jack Abbott	James Sandbach	Antony Love	Adria Pittock		Conservative	Tom Hunt
Lowestoft	Peter Aldous	Jessica Asato	Adam Robertson	June Mummery	Toby Hammond		Conservative	Peter Aldous
Luton North	Jilleane Brown	Sarah Owen	Sean Prendergast	James Fletcher	Ejel Khan		Labour	Sarah Owen
Luton South and South Bedfordshire	Mark Versallion	Rachel Hopkins	Dominic Griffiths	Norman Maclean	Edward Carpenter		Labour	Rachel Hopkins
Maldon	John Whittingdale	Onike Gollo	Simon Burwood	Pamela Walford	Isobel Doubleday		Conservative	John Whittingdale
Mid Bedfordshire	Blake Stephenson	Maahwish Mirza	Stuart Roberts	Dave Holland	Cade Sibley		Labour	Alistair Strathern (Note: Elected in the 2023 Mid Bedfordshire by-election, running for re-election in the new Hitchin seat (contains 15% of Mid Bedfordshire including Strathern's home town of Shefford).)
Mid Norfolk	George Freeman	Michael Rosen	Stuart Howard	Kabeer Kher	Ash Haynes	Simon Blackwell (Workers)	Conservative	George Freeman
North Bedfordshire	Richard Fuller	Uday Nagaraju	Joanna Szaub-Newton	Pippa Clayton	Philippa Fleming		Conservative	Richard Fuller
North East Cambridgeshire	Steve Barclay	Javeria Hussain	David Chalmers	Christopher Thornhill	Andrew Crawford	Michael Roberts (SDP)	Conservative	Steve Barclay
North East Hertfordshire	Nikki Da Costa	Chris Hinchliff	Ruth Brown	Steven Adelantado	Vicky Burt		Conservative	Oliver Heald
North Norfolk	Duncan Baker	Cathy Cordiner-Achenbach	Steffan Aquarone	Jason Patchett	Liz Dixon		Conservative	Duncan Baker
North West Cambridgeshire	Shailesh Vara	Sam Carling	Bridget Smith	James Sidlow	Elliot Tong		Conservative	Shailesh Vara
North West Essex	Kemi Badenoch	Issy Waite	Smita Rajesh	Grant StClair-Armstrong	Edward Gildea	Andrew David Green (Independent); Erik Bonino (Independent); Niko Omilana (Independent)	Conservative	Kemi Badenoch
North West Norfolk	James Wild	Tim Leaver	Rob Colwell	Phil Walton	Michael de Whalley		Conservative	James Wild
Norwich North	Charlotte Salomon	Alice MacDonald	Chika Akinwale	Nick Taylor	Ben Price		Conservative	Chloe Smith
Norwich South	David Simister-Thomas	Clive Lewis	Sean Bennett	Graham Burton	Jamie Osborn		Labour	Clive Lewis
Peterborough	Paul Bristow	Andrew Pakes	Nick Sandford	Sue Morris	Nicola Day	Dr Tom Rogers (CPA)	Conservative	Paul Bristow
Rayleigh and Wickford	Mark Francois	James Hedges	Stewart Mott	Grant Randall	Christopher Taylor		Conservative	Mark Francois
South Basildon and East Thurrock	Stephen Metcalfe	Jack Ferguson	David Thomas	James McMurdock	Elizabeth Grant		Conservative	Stephen Metcalfe
South Cambridgeshire	Christopher Carter-Chapman	Luke Viner	Pippa Heylings	Harrison Edwards	Miranda Fyfe	James Gordon (Independent)	Conservative	Anthony Browne (Note: Incumbent MP for South Cambridgeshire, contesting St Neots and Mid Cambridgeshire)
South Norfolk	Poppy Simister-Thomas	Ben Goldsborough	Chris Brown	Chris Harrison	Catherine Rowett		Conservative	Richard Bacon
South Suffolk	James Cartlidge	Emma Bishton	Tom Bartleet	Beverley England	Jessie Carter		Conservative	James Cartlidge
South West Hertfordshire	Gagan Mohindra	Alex Sufit	Sally Symington	Keith Steers	Narinder Sian	Muhammed Pervez Khan (Workers)	Conservative	Gagan Mohindra
South West Norfolk	Liz Truss	Terry Jermy	Josie Ratcliffe	Toby McKenzie	Pallavi Devulapalli	James Bagge (Independent)	Conservative	Liz Truss
Southend East and Rochford	Gavin Haran	Bayo Alaba	James Allen	Leslie Lilley	Simon Cross		Conservative	James Duddridge
Southend West and Leigh	Anna Firth	David Burton-Sampson	Stephen Cummins	Peter Little	Tilly Hogrebe	James Miller (Confelicity)	Conservative	Anna Firth (Note: Elected in a by-election)
St Albans	James Spencer	Sophia Adams Bhatti	Daisy Cooper	Sam Woodruff	Simon Grover	Stewart Satterly (SDP)	Liberal Democrats	Daisy Cooper
St Neots and Mid Cambridgeshire	Anthony Browne	Marianna Masters	Ian Sollom	Guy Lachlan	Kathryn Fisher	Stephen Ferguson (Independent); Bev White (Party of Women)	Conservative	New seat
Stevenage	Alex Clarkson	Kevin Bonavia	Lisa Nash	Peter Hopper	Paul Dawson		Conservative	Stephen McPartland
Suffolk Coastal	Thérèse Coffey	Jenny Riddell-Carpenter	Julia Ewart	Matt Jackson	Julian Cusack		Conservative	Thérèse Coffey
Thurrock	Jackie Doyle-Price	Jen Craft	Michael Bukola	Sophie Almina Preston-Hall	Eugene Mccarth		Conservative	Jackie Doyle-Price
Watford	Dean Russell	Matt Turmaine	Ian Stotesbury	Gary Ling	Arran Bowen-la Grange	Khalid Mahmood (Workers)	Conservative	Dean Russell
Waveney Valley	Richard Rout	Gurpreet Padda	John Shreeve	Scott Huggins	Adrian Ramsay	Maya Severyn (SDP)	Conservative	New seat
Welwyn Hatfield	Grant Shapps	Andrew Lewin	John Munro	Jack Aaron	Sarah Butcher		Conservative	Grant Shapps
West Suffolk	Nick Timothy	Rebecca Denness	Henry Batchelor	Ian Edmund Bonham	Mark Ereira-Guyer	Ivan Kinsman (SDP)	Conservative	Matt Hancock
Witham	Priti Patel	Rumi Chowdhury	Ashley Thompson	Timothy Blaxill	James Abbott		Conservative	Priti Patel

== East Midlands ==
Bold meant the candidate was elected.

Constituency	Conservative	Labour	Liberal Democrats	Reform UK	Green Party	Others	Incumbent	
Amber Valley	Nigel Mills	Linsey Farnsworth	Kate Smith	Alex Stevenson	Matt McGuinness		Conservative	Nigel Mills
Ashfield	Debbie Soloman (Note: 2019 Brexit Party candidate in Bassetlaw)	Rhea Keehn	Daniel Holmes	Lee Anderson	Alexander Coates	Jason Zadrozny (Ashfield Independents)	Reform UK (elected as Conservative)	Lee Anderson
Bassetlaw	Brendan Clarke-Smith	Jo White	Helen Tamblyn-Saville	Frank Ward	Rachel Reeves (Note: Not to be confused with the Chancellor of the Exchequer of the same name.)		Conservative	Brendan Clarke-Smith
Bolsover	Mark Fletcher	Natalie Fleet	David Hancock	Robert Reaney	David Kesteven	Jack Evans (Workers)	Conservative	Mark Fletcher
Boston and Skegness	Matt Warman	Alex Fawbert	Richard Lloyd	Richard Tice	Christopher Moore	David Dickason (English Democrats)	Conservative	Matt Warman
Hinckley and Bosworth	Luke Evans	Rebecca Pawley	Michael Mullaney	Peter Cheshire	Cassie Wells		Conservative	Luke Evans (Bosworth)
Broxtowe	Darren Henry	Juliet Campbell	James Collis	Joseph Oakley	Teresa Needham	Syed Maqsood (Workers); Dr John Doddy (Independent)	Conservative	Darren Henry
Chesterfield	Ben Flook	Toby Perkins	Ian Barfield	Dan Price	Simon Geikie		Labour	Toby Perkins
Corby and East Northamptonshire	Tom Pursglove	Lee Barron	Chris Lofts	Edward McDonald	Lee Forster	Karen Blott (Independent)	Conservative	Tom Pursglove (Corby)
Daventry	Stuart Andrew (Note: Incumbent MP for Pudsey)	Marianne Kimani	Jonathan Harris	Scott Cameron	Clare Slater		Conservative	Chris Heaton-Harris (Note: Not running for re-election)
Derby North	Amanda Solloway	Catherine Atkinson	John Sweeney	Tim Prosser	Helen Hitchcock	Imran Hamid (Workers)	Conservative	Amanda Solloway
Derby South	Jamie Mulhall	Baggy Shanker	Joe Naitta	Alan Graves	Sam Ward	Chris Williamson (Workers)	Labour	Margaret Beckett
Derbyshire Dales	Sarah Dines	John Whitby	Robert Court	Edward Oakenfull	Kelda Boothroyd	Helen Wetherall (True and Fair); Rachel Elnaugh (Independent)	Conservative	Sarah Dines
Erewash	Maggie Throup	Adam Thompson	James Archer	Liam Booth-Isherwood	Brent Poland		Conservative	Maggie Throup
Gainsborough	Edward Leigh	Jess McGuire	Lesley Rollings	Pat O'Connor	Vanessa Smith	Tim Mellors (SDP)	Conservative	Edward Leigh
Gedling	Tom Randall	Michael Payne	Tad Jones	Simon Christy	Dominic Berry		Conservative	Tom Randall
Harborough, Oadby and Wigston	Neil O'Brien	Hajira Piranie	Phil Knowles	Danuta Jeeves	Darren Woodiwiss	Robin Lambert (SDP)	Conservative	Neil O'Brien (Harborough)
High Peak	Robert Largan	Jon Pearce	Peter Hirst	Catherine Cullen	Joanna Collins		Conservative	Robert Largan
Kettering	Philip Hollobone	Rosie Wrighting	Sarah Ryan	Daniel Monie	Emily Fedorowycz	Matthew Murphy (SDP) Thomas Dudfield (Workers)	Conservative	Philip Hollobone
Leicester East	Shivani Raja	Rajesh Agrawal	Zuffar Haq	Raj Solanki	Mags Lewis	Claudia Webbe (Independent); Keith Vaz (Independent – One Leicester); Malihah Adam (Independent); Nagarjun Agath (Independent); Khandu Patel (Independent)	Independent (elected as Labour)	Claudia Webbe
Leicester South	Geraldine Hickton	Jonathan Ashworth	Carol Weaver	Craig Harwood	Sharmen Rahman	Shockat Adam (Independent)	Labour	Jonathan Ashworth
Leicester West	Max Chauhan	Liz Kendall	Benjamin Feist	Ian Hayes	Aasiya Bora		Labour	Liz Kendall
Lincoln	Karl McCartney	Hamish Falconer	Clare Smalley	Jamie-Lee McMillan	Sally Horscroft	Craig Marshall (SDP) Linda Richardson (Workers)	Conservative	Karl McCartney
Loughborough	Jane Hunt	Jeevun Sandher	Ian Sharpe	Andy McWilliam	Hans Zollinger		Conservative	Jane Hunt
Louth and Horncastle	Victoria Atkins	Jonathan Slater	Ross Pepper	Sean Matthews	Robert Watson		Conservative	Victoria Atkins
Mansfield	Ben Bradley	Steve Yemm	Michael Wyatt	Matt Warnes	Philip Shields		Conservative	Ben Bradley
Mid Derbyshire	Luke Gardiner	Jonathan Davies	Barry Holliday	Stephen Dean	Gez Kinsella	Josiah Uche (Workers)	Conservative	Pauline Latham
Newark	Robert Jenrick	Saj Ahmad	David Watts	Robert Hall-Palmer	Michael Ackroyd		Conservative	Robert Jenrick
North East Derbyshire	Lee Rowley	Louise Jones	Ross Shipman	Andy Egginton	Frank Adlington-Stringer		Conservative	Lee Rowley
North West Leicestershire	Craig Smith	Amanda Hack	Alice Delamere	Noel Matthews	Carl Benfield	Andrew Bridgen (Independent) Jevan Heatherley (Workers)	Independent (elected as Conservative)	Andrew Bridgen
Northampton North	Dan Bennett	Lucy Rigby	Chris Leggett	Antony Antoniou	Eishar Bassan	Khalid Razzaq (Workers)	Conservative	Michael Ellis
Northampton South	Andrew Lewer	Mike Reader	Jill Hope	Anthony Owens	Simon Sneddon		Conservative	Andrew Lewer
Nottingham East	Johno Lee	Nadia Whittome	Anita Prabhakar	Debbie Stephens	Rosemary Palmer		Labour	Nadia Whittome
Nottingham North and Kimberley	Caroline Henry	Alex Norris	David Schmitz	Golam Kadiri	Samuel Harvey		Labour	Alex Norris (Nottingham North)
Nottingham South	Zarmeena Abdul Quraishi	Lilian Greenwood	Christina Morgan-Danvers	Mykel Hedge	Cath Sutherland		Labour	Lilian Greenwood
Rushcliffe	Ruth Edwards	James Naish	Greg Webb	James Grice	Richard Mallender		Conservative	Ruth Edwards
Mid Leicestershire	Peter Bedford	Robert Martin	Ian Bradwell	Tom Smith	Tony Deakin		Conservative	Edward Argar (Charnwood)
Melton and Syston	Edward Argar	Zafran Khan	Andy Konieczko	Peter Morris	Alastair McQuillan	Teck Khong (Alliance for Democracy and Freedom)	Conservative	New seat
Rutland and Stamford	Alicia Kearns	Joe Wood	James Moore	Chris Clowes	Emma Baker		Conservative	Alicia Kearns (Rutland and Melton)
Grantham and Bourne	Gareth Davies	Vipul Bechar	John Vincent	Mike Rudkin	Anne Gayfer		Conservative	Gareth Davies (Grantham and Stamford)
Sherwood Forest	Mark Spencer	Michelle Welsh	David Dobbie	Helen O'Hare	Sheila Greatrex-White	Lee Waters (Ashfield Independents) (Note: Not the Labour Senedd member of the same name)	Conservative	Mark Spencer (Sherwood)
Sleaford and North Hykeham	Caroline Johnson	Hanif Khan	Matthew Winnington	Ben Jackson	Christopher Padley		Conservative	Dr Caroline Johnson
South Derbyshire	Heather Wheeler	Samantha Niblett	Lucy Care	Joseph West	Aruhan Galieva		Conservative	Heather Wheeler
South Holland and The Deepings	John Hayes	Paul Hilliar	Jack Braginton	Matthew Swainson	Rhys Baker	Mark Le Sage (Independent)	Conservative	John Hayes
South Leicestershire	Alberto Costa	Robert Parkinson	Paul Hartshorn	Bill Piper	Mike Jelfs		Conservative	Alberto Costa
South Northamptonshire	Sarah Bool	Rufia Ashraf	Stewart Tolley	Paul Hogan	Emmie Williamson	Mick Stott (Workers)	Conservative	Andrea Leadsom
Wellingborough and Rushden	David Goss	Gen Kitchen (Note: Elected in a by-election)	Christopher Townsend	Ben Habib	Paul Mannion	Jeremy Brittin (SDP)	Labour	Gen Kitchen (Note: Elected in a by-election) (Wellingborough)

== London ==
Bold meant the candidate was elected.

Constituency	Conservative	Labour	Liberal Democrats	Reform UK	Green Party	Others	Incumbent	
Barking	Julie Redmond	Nesil Caliskan	Charley Hasted	Clive Peacock	Simon Anthony	Hamid Shah (Workers)	Labour	Margaret Hodge
Battersea	Tom Pridham	Marsha de Cordova	Francis Chubb	Barry Edwards	Joe Taylor	Hazel James (Workers)	Labour	Marsha de Cordova
Beckenham and Penge	Hannah Gray	Liam Conlon	Chloe-Jane Ross	Edward Apostolides	Ruth Fabricant		Conservative	Bob Stewart (Beckenham)
Bermondsey and Old Southwark	Jonathan Iliff	Neil Coyle	Rachel Bentley	Tony Sharp	Susan Hunter		Labour	Neil Coyle
Bethnal Green and Stepney	Oscar Reaney	Rushanara Ali	Rabina Khan	Peter Sceats	Phoebe Gill	Reggie Adams (Independent); Md Somon Ahmed (Independent); Vanessa Hudson (Animal Welfare); Jon Mabbutt (SDP); Ajmal Masroor (Independent); Sham Uddin (Independent)	Labour	Rushanara Ali (Bethnal Green and Bow)
Bexleyheath and Crayford	Mark Brooks	Daniel Francis	David McBride	Tom Bright	George Edgar		Conservative	David Evennett
Brent East	Jamila Robertson	Dawn Butler	Jonny Singh	Zbigniew Kowalczyk	Nida Alfulaij	James Mutimer (Workers)	Labour	Dawn Butler (Brent Central)
Brent West	Sushil Rapatwar	Barry Gardiner	Paul Lorber	Ian Collier	Bastôn De'medici-jaguar		Labour	Barry Gardiner (Brent North)
Brentford and Isleworth	Laura Blumenthal	Ruth Cadbury	Kuldev Sehra	David Kerr	Freya Summersgill		Labour	Ruth Cadbury
Bromley and Biggin Hill	Peter Fortune	Oana Olaru-Holmes	Julie Ireland	Alan Cook	Caroline Sandes		Conservative	Bob Neill (Bromley and Chislehurst)
Carshalton and Wallington	Elliot Colburn	Hersh Thaker	Bobby Dean	Elizabeth Cooper	Tracey Hague		Conservative	Elliot Colburn
Chelsea and Fulham	Greg Hands	Ben Coleman	Blaise Baquiche	Rob Ellis	Mona Crocker		Conservative	Greg Hands
Chingford and Woodford Green	Iain Duncan Smith	Shama Tatler	Josh Hadley	Paul Luggeri	Chris Brody	Faiza Shaheen (Independent)	Conservative	Iain Duncan Smith
Chipping Barnet	Theresa Villiers	Dan Tomlinson	Mark Durrant	Hamish Haddow	David Farbey		Conservative	Theresa Villiers
Cities of London and Westminster	Tim Barnes	Rachel Blake	Edward Lucas	Tarun Ghulati	Rajiv Sinha	Liz Burford (Rejoin EU); Matthew Carr (Independent); Huge de Burgh(SDP); John Generic (Independent); Tim Hallett (Independent); Hoz Shafiei (Workers)	Conservative	Nickie Aiken
Clapham and Brixton Hill	Asha Saroy	Bell Ribeiro-Addy	Ben Curtis	Mark Matlock	Shao-lan Yuen		Labour	Bell Ribeiro-Addy (Streatham)
Croydon West	Simon Fox	Sarah Jones	Jahir Hussain	Vinayak Malhotra	Ria Patel		Labour	New seat
Croydon East	Jason Cummings	Natasha Irons	Andrew Pelling (Note: Served as Conservative MP for Croydon Central from 2005 to 2010)	Scott Holman	Peter Underwood		Labour	Sarah Jones (Note: Stood in the new Croydon West) (Croydon Central)
Croydon South	Chris Philp	Ben Taylor	Richard Howard	Lucian Fernando	Elaine Garrod		Conservative	Chris Philp
Dagenham and Rainham	Sam Holland	Margaret Mullane	Francesca Rose Flack	Kevin Godfrey	Kim Arrowsmith	Terence London (Independent)	Labour	Jon Cruddas
Dulwich and West Norwood	Leon Cook	Helen Hayes	Donna Harris	Gary Stevens	Pete Elliott	Mike Spenser (Independent)	Labour	Helen Hayes
Ealing Central and Acton	James Windsor-Clive	Rupa Huq	Alastair Mitton	Felix Orrell	Kate Crossland	Stephen Balogh (SDP)	Labour	Rupa Huq
Ealing North	Maria Khan	James Murray	Craig O'Donnell	Harvey Griffiths	Natalia Kubica	Leslie Beaumont (SDP); Sameh Habeeb (Workers); Helmi Alharahsheh (Independent)	Labour	James Murray
Ealing Southall	Georgie Callé	Deirdre Costigan	Tariq Mahmood	Steve Chilcott	Neil Reynolds	Darshan Azad (Workers); Sangeet Bhail (Independent); Joe Bhangu (Independent); Pedro da Conceição (Independent); Niko Omilana (no description); Jaginder Singh (no description); Peter Ward (Rejoin EU)	Labour	Virendra Sharma
East Ham	Maria Higson	Stephen Timms	Hillary Briffa	Dan Oxley	Rosie Pearce	Tahir Mirza (Independent)	Labour	Stephen Timms
Edmonton and Winchmore Hill	Zoe Huggins	Kate Osamor	Tim Martin	Neville Watson	Luke Balnave		Labour	Kate Osamor (Edmonton)
Eltham and Chislehurst	Charlie Davis	Clive Efford	Ulysse Abbate	Mark Simpson	Sam Gabriel		Labour	Clive Efford (Eltham)
Enfield North	Chris Dey	Feryal Clark	Gaetano Russo	Stephen Bird	Isobel Whittaker		Labour	Feryal Clark
Erith and Thamesmead	Richard Mark	Abena Oppong-Asare	Pierce Chalmers	Michael Pastor	Sarah Barry		Labour	Abena Oppong-Asare
Feltham and Heston	Reva Gudi	Seema Malhotra	Dhruv Sengupta	Prabhdeep Singh	Katharine Kandelaki	Damian Read (Independent); Amrit Mann (Workers)	Labour	Seema Malhotra
Finchley and Golders Green	Alex Deane	Sarah Sackman	Sarah Hoyle	Bepi Pezzulli	Steve Parsons	Mez Roth (Workers)	Conservative	Mike Freer
Greenwich and Woolwich	Jonathan Goff	Matthew Pennycook	Chris Annous	Clinton Wright	Stacy Smith		Labour	Matthew Pennycook
Hackney North and Stoke Newington	David Landau	Diane Abbott	Rebecca Jones	Deborah Cairns	Antoinette Fernandez	Ryan Ahmad (Independent); Kombat Diva (Independent); Knigel Knapp (MRLP)	Labour (Note: Whip restored just before dissolution of Parliament having been suspended from the Labour Party for over a year)	Diane Abbott
Hackney South and Shoreditch	Joanna Reeves	Meg Hillier	Theodore Roos	Peter Smorthit	Laura-Louise Fairley	Shahed Hussain (Workers); Carol Susan Small (Workers Revolutionary Party)	Labour	Meg Hillier
Hammersmith and Chiswick	Andrew Dinsmore	Andy Slaughter	Eraj Rostaqi	Anthony Goodwin	Naranee Ruthra-Rajan		Labour	Andy Slaughter (Hammersmith)
Hampstead and Highgate	Don Williams	Tulip Siddiq	Scott Emery	Catherine Becker	Lorna Jane Russell		Labour	Tulip Siddiq (Hampstead and Kilburn)
Harrow East	Bob Blackman	Primesh Patel	Reetendra Banerji	Roger Clark	Sebastian Newsam		Conservative	Bob Blackman
Harrow West	Abbas Merali	Gareth Thomas	Chris Noyce	Michael Beavis	Rupert George	Pamela Fitzpatrick (Independent)	Labour	Gareth Thomas
Hayes and Harlington	Dylan Thomas	John McDonnell	Alex Cunliffe	Francoise Thompson	Christine West	Rizwana Karim (Workers)	Labour	John McDonnell
Hendon	Ameet Jogia	David Pinto-Duschinsky	Clareine Enderby	Joshua Leon Pearl	Gabrielle Bailey	Jane Gibson (SDP); Rasheed Sarpong (Workers)	Conservative	Matthew Offord
Holborn and St Pancras	Mehreen Malik	Keir Starmer	Charlie Clinton	Dave Roberts	David Stansell	Andrew Feinstein (Independent); Wais Islam (Independent); Senthil Kumar (Independent); Nick the Incredible Flying Brick (Monster Raving Loony); John Poynton (UKIP); Tom Scripps (Socialist Equality); Bobby Smith (no description)	Labour	Keir Starmer
Hornchurch and Upminster	Julia Lopez	Sunny Brar	Ian Sanderson	Nicholas Palmer	Melanie Collins	David Warren Durant (Independent)	Conservative	Julia Lopez
Hornsey and Friern Barnet	Naz Panju	Catherine West	Dawn Barnes	Navdeep Singh	Fabio Vollono		Labour	Catherine West (Hornsey and Wood Green)
Ilford North	Kaz Rizvi	Wes Streeting	Fraser Coppin	Alex Wilson	Rachel Collinson	Leanne Mohamad (Independent)	Labour	Wes Streeting
Ilford South	Syduzzaman Sayeed	Jas Athwal	Richard Clare	Raj Forhad	Syed Siddiqi		Labour	Sam Tarry (Note: Was not reselected as a candidate)
Islington North	Karen Allen	Praful Nargund	Vikas Aggarwal	Martyn Nelson	Sheridan Kates	Jeremy Corbyn (Independent)	Independent (elected as Labour)	Jeremy Corbyn
Islington South and Finsbury	Imogen Sinclair	Emily Thornberry	Terry Stacy	Max Nelson	Carne Ross	Jake Painter (SDP)	Labour	Emily Thornberry
Kensington and Bayswater	Felicity Buchan	Joe Powell	William Houngbo	Marc Burca	Mona Adam	Emma Dent Coad (Independent) (Note: Served as a Labour MP for this seat prior to the 2019 general election)	Conservative	Felicity Buchan (Kensington)
Kingston and Surbiton	Helen Edward	Eunice O'Dame	Ed Davey	Mark Fox	Debojyoti Das	Yvonne Tracey (KIRG)	Liberal Democrats	Ed Davey
Lewisham East	Louise Brice	Janet Daby	Callum Littlemore	Ruth Handyside	Michael Herron		Labour	Janet Daby
Lewisham North	Nupur Majumdar	Vicky Foxcroft	Jean Branch	Jonathan Crozier	Adam Pugh		Labour	Vicky Foxcroft (Lewisham Deptford)
Lewisham West and East Dulwich	Christine Wallace	Ellie Reeves	Josh Matthews	Marian Lynn Newton	Callum Fowler		Labour	Ellie Reeves (Lewisham West and Penge)
Leyton and Wanstead	Gloria Croxall	Calvin Bailey	Tara Copeland	David Sandground	Charlotte Lafferty		Labour	John Cryer
Mitcham and Morden	Ellie Cox	Siobhain McDonagh	Jenifer Gould	Tania Marszalec	Pippa Maslin		Labour	Siobhain McDonagh
Old Bexley and Sidcup	Louie French	Edward Jones	Adrian Hyyrylainen-Trett	Maxine Fothergill	Bradley Davies	Lawrence Easterbrook (SDP)	Conservative	Louie French (Note: Elected in a by-election)
Orpington	Gareth Bacon	Ju Owens	Graeme Casey	Mark James	Seamus Mccauley		Conservative	Gareth Bacon
Peckham	Ben Mascall	Miatta Fahnbulleh	David Watson	Linda Purcell	Claire Sheppard		Labour	Harriet Harman (Camberwell and Peckham)
Poplar and Limehouse	Freddie Downing	Apsana Begum	Richard Flowers	Tony Glover	Nathalie Bienfait		Labour	Apsana Begum
Putney	Lee Roberts	Fleur Anderson	Kieren McCarthy	Andrew Todd	Fergal Mcentee		Labour	Fleur Anderson
Queen's Park and Maida Vale	Samia Hersi	Georgia Gould	Helen Baxter	Angela Carter Begbie	Vivien Lichtenstein	Irakli Menabde (Workers)	Labour	Karen Buck (Westminster North)
Richmond Park	Sara Gezdari	Laura Coryton	Sarah Olney	Michael Hearn	Chas Warlow		Liberal Democrats	Sarah Olney
Romford	Andrew Rosindell	Andrew Achilleos	Thomas Clarke	Philip Hyde	David Hughes	Colin Birch (English Constitution Party); Zhafaran Qayum (Workers)	Conservative	Andrew Rosindell
Ruislip, Northwood and Pinner	David Simmonds	Tony Gill	Jonathan Banks	Ian Price	Jessica Lee		Conservative	David Simmonds
Southgate and Wood Green	Eric Sukumaran	Bambos Charalambous	Lauren Fulbright	David Schofield	Charith Gunawardena		Labour	Bambos Charalambous (Enfield Southgate)
Sutton and Cheam	Tom Drummond	Chrishni Reshekaron	Luke Taylor	Ryan Powell	Aasha Anam		Conservative	Paul Scully
Stratford and Bow	Kane Blackwell	Uma Kumaran	Janey Little	Jeff Evans	Joe Hudson-Small	Fiona Lali (Independent); Halima Khan (Workers)	Labour	New seat
Streatham and Croydon North	Anthony Boutall	Steve Reed	Claire Bonham	Philip Watson	Scott Ainslie	Myles Owen (SDP)	Labour	Steve Reed (Croydon North)
Tooting	Ethan Brooks	Rosena Allin-Khan	Judith Trounson	Andrew Price	Nick Humberstone		Labour	Rosena Allin-Khan
Tottenham	Attic Rahman	David Lammy	Durgesh Hari Prabu	Roger Gravett	David Craig		Labour	David Lammy
Twickenham	Jonathan Hulley	Tom Bruce	Munira Wilson	Alexander Starling	Chantal Kerr-Shepherd		Liberal Democrats	Munira Wilson
Uxbridge and South Ruislip	Steve Tuckwell	Danny Beales	Ian Rex-Hawkes	Tim Wheeler	Sarah Green (Note: Not the Lib Dem former MP and 2024 candidate for the nearby constituency of Chesham and Amersham of the same name)	Stephen Gardner (SDP)	Conservative	Steve Tuckwell (Note: Elected in a by-election)
Vauxhall and Camberwell Green	Aarti Joshi	Florence Eshalomi	Chris French	Mike King	Catherine Dawkins	Andrew McRobbie (SDP); Darren Jones (Workers)	Labour	Florence Eshalomi (Vauxhall)
Walthamstow	Sanjana Karnani	Stella Creasy	Rebecca Taylor	Martin Lonergan	Rosalinda Rowlands		Labour	Stella Creasy
West Ham and Beckton	Holly Ramsey	James Asser	Emily Bigland	Peter Monks	Rob Callender	Lois Austin (TUSC); Sophia Naqvi (Newham Independents Party); Kayode Shedowo (CPeA)	Labour	Lyn Brown (West Ham)
Wimbledon	Danielle Dunfield-Prayero	Eleanor Stringer	Paul Kohler	Ben Cronin	Rachel Brooks	Aaron Mafi (Workers)	Conservative	Stephen Hammond

== Northern Ireland ==
Bold meant the candidate was elected.

Constituency	Sinn Féin	DUP	Alliance	UUP	SDLP	TUV	Green	Aontú	Others	Incumbent	
Belfast East		Gavin Robinson	Naomi Long	Ryan Warren	Séamas de Faoite	John Ross	Brian Smyth		Ryan North (Independent)	DUP	Gavin Robinson
Belfast North	John Finucane	Phillip Brett	Nuala McAllister		Carl Whyte	David Clarke	Mal O'Hara		Fiona Ferguson (PBP)	SF	John Finucane
Belfast South and Mid Down		Tracy Kelly	Kate Nicholl	Michael Henderson	Claire Hanna	Dan Boucher	Áine Groogan			SDLP	Claire Hanna
Belfast West	Paul Maskey	Frank McCoubrey	Eóin Millar	Ben Sharkey	Paul Doherty	Ann McClure	Ash Jones	Gerard Herdman	Gerry Carroll (PBP); Tony Mallon (Independent)	SF	Paul Maskey
East Antrim	Oliver McMullan	Sammy Wilson	Danny Donnelly	John Stewart	Margaret Anne McKillop	Matthew Warwick	Mark Bailey			DUP	Sammy Wilson
East Londonderry	Kathleen McGurk	Gregory Campbell	Richard Stewart	Glen Miller	Cara Hunter	Allister Kyle	Jen McCahon	Gemma Brolly	Claire Scull (Conservative)	DUP	Gregory Campbell
Fermanagh and South Tyrone	Pat Cullen		Eddie Roofe	Diana Armstrong	Paul Blake			Carl Duffy	Gerry Cullen (CCLA)	SF	Michelle Gildernew
Foyle	Sandra Duffy	Gary Middleton	Rachael Ferguson	Janice Montgomery	Colum Eastwood			John Boyle	Shaun Harkin (PBP); Anne McCloskey (Independent)	SDLP	Colum Eastwood
Lagan Valley		Jonathan Buckley	Sorcha Eastwood	Robbie Butler	Simon Lee	Lorna Smyth	Patricia Denvir			Independent (elected as DUP)	Jeffrey Donaldson
Mid Ulster	Cathal Mallaghan	Keith Buchanan	Padraic Farrell	Jay Basra	Denise Johnston	Glenn Moore		Alixandra Halliday	John Kelly (Independent)	SF	Francie Molloy
Newry and Armagh	Dáire Hughes	Gareth Wilson	Helena Young	Sam Nicholson	Pete Byrne	Keith Ratcliffe		Liam Reichenberg	Samantha Rayner (Conservative)	SF	Mickey Brady
North Antrim	Philip McGuigan	Ian Paisley Jr	Sian Mulholland	Jackson Minford	Helen Maher	Jim Allister		Ráichéal Mhic Niocaill	Tristan Morrow (Independent)	DUP	Ian Paisley Jr
North Down			Stephen Farry	Tim Collins	Déirdre Vaughan		Barry McKee		Alex Easton (Independent); Chris Carter (Independent)	APNI	Stephen Farry
South Antrim	Declan Kearney	Paul Girvan	John Blair	Robin Swann	Roisin Lynch	Mel Lucas	Lesley Veronica	Siobhan McErlean		DUP	Paul Girvan
South Down	Chris Hazzard	Diane Forsythe	Andrew McMurray	Michael O'Loan	Colin McGrath	Jim Wells	Declan Walsh	Rosemary McGlone	Hannah Westropp (Conservative)	SF	Chris Hazzard
Strangford	Noel Sands	Jim Shannon	Michelle Guy	Richard Smart	Will Polland	Ron McDowell	Alexandra Braidner		Gareth Burns (Independent); Garreth Falls (Independent); Barry Hetherington (Conservative)	DUP	Jim Shannon
Upper Bann	Catherine Nelson	Carla Lockhart	Eóin Tennyson	Kate Evans	Malachy Quinn					DUP	Carla Lockhart
West Tyrone	Órfhlaith Begley	Tom Buchanan	Stephen Donnelly	Matthew Bell	Daniel McCrossan	Stevan Patterson		Leza Houston	Stephen Lynch (Conservative)	SF	Órfhlaith Begley

== North East England ==
Bold meant the candidate was elected.

Constituency (2024–)	Conservative	Labour	Liberal Democrats	Reform UK	Green Party	SDP	Others	Incumbent	
Bishop Auckland	Jane MacBean	Sam Rushworth	Helen Cross	Rhys Burriss	Sarah Hannan		Rachel Maughan (Transform)	Conservative	Dehenna Davison
Blaydon and Consett	Angela Sterling	Liz Twist	Vicky Anderson	David Ayre	Richard Simpson	Paul Topping		Labour	Liz Twist
Blaydon and Consett	Angela Sterling	Liz Twist	Vicky Anderson	David Ayre	Richard Simpson	Paul Topping		Conservative	Richard Holden
Blyth and Ashington	Maureen Levy	Ian Lavery	Stephen Psallidas	Mark Peart	Steve Leyland			Labour	Ian Lavery
City of Durham	Luke Holmes	Mary Kelly Foy	Mark Wilkes	Mark Belch	Jonathan Elmer	Sarah Welbourne		Labour	Mary Kelly Foy
Cramlington and Killingworth	Ian Levy	Emma Foody	Thom Campion	Gordon Fletcher	Ian Jones	Mathew Wilkinson	Dawn Furness (Independent); Scott Lee (Independent)	Conservative	Ian Levy
Darlington	Peter Gibson	Lola McEvoy	Simon Thorley	Michael Walker	Matthew Snedker			Conservative	Peter Gibson
Easington	Joanne Howey	Grahame Morris	Tony Ferguson	Lynn Murphy	Stephen Ashfield		Mary Cartwright (North East Party)	Labour	Grahame Morris
Gateshead Central and Whickham	Nick Oliver	Mark Ferguson	Ron Beadle	Damian Heslop	Rachel Cabral		Norman Hall (TUSC); Graham Steele (Save Us Now)	Labour	Ian Mearns
Hartlepool	Jill Mortimer	Jonathan Brash	Peter Maughan	Amanda Napper	Jeremy Spyby-Steanson		Thomas Dudley (Workers); Vivienne Neville (Heritage); Sam Lee (Independent)	Conservative	Jill Mortimer (Note: Elected in a by-election)
Hexham	Guy Opperman	Joe Morris	Nick Cott		Nick Morphet	William Clouston	Chris Whaley (Independent)	Conservative	Guy Opperman
Houghton and Sunderland South	Chris Burnicle	Bridget Phillipson	Paul Edgeworth	Sam Woods-Brass	Richard Bradley			Labour	Bridget Phillipson
Jarrow and Gateshead East	Jack Gebhard	Kate Osborne	James Rickelton	Lynda Alexander	Nic Cook		Mark Conway (Alliance for Democracy and Freedom)	Labour	Kate Osborne
Middlesbrough and Thornaby East	Kiran Fothergill	Andy McDonald	Mohammed Waqas	Patrick Seargeant	Matthew Harris		Mark Baxtrem (Independent)	Labour	Andy McDonald
Middlesbrough South and East Cleveland	Simon Clarke	Luke Myer	Jemma Joy		Rowan McLaughlin	Rod Liddle		Conservative	Simon Clarke
Newcastle upon Tyne Central and West	Frances Lasok	Chi Onwurah	Ali Avaei	Ashton Hektor Muncaster	John Pearson		Yvonne Ridley (Independent); Habib Rahman (Independent)	Labour	Chi Onwurah
Newcastle upon Tyne East and Wallsend	Rosie Hanlon	Mary Glindon	Mark Ridyard	Janice Richardson	Matthew Williams	Robert Malyn	Muhammed Ghori (Workers); Liz Panton (Party of Women)	Independent (Note: Elected for Labour)	Nick Brown
Newcastle upon Tyne East and Wallsend	Rosie Hanlon	Mary Glindon	Mark Ridyard	Janice Richardson	Matthew Williams	Robert Malyn	Muhammed Ghori (Workers); Liz Panton (Party of Women)	Labour	Mary Glindon
Newcastle upon Tyne North	Guy Renner-Thompson	Catherine McKinnell	Aidan King	Deborah Lorraine	Sarah Peters	Martin Evison	King Teare (Independent)	Labour	Catherine McKinnell
Newton Aycliffe and Spennymoor	Paul Howell	Alan Strickland	Anne-Marie Curry	John Grant	Jack Hughes		Minhajul Suhon (Workers); Terence Brian Agar (Transform)	Conservative	Paul Howell
North Durham	George Carter	Luke Akehurst	Craig Martin	Andrew Husband	Sunny Moon-Schott	Tom Chittenden	Chris Bradburn (Workers)	Labour	Kevan Jones
North Northumberland	Anne-Marie Trevelyan	David Smith	Natalie Younes	Katherine Hales	Jan Rosen	Andrew Martin		Conservative	Anne-Marie Trevelyan
Redcar	Jacob Young	Anna Turley	Chris Jones	John Davies	Ruth Hatton	Gary Conlin		Conservative	Jacob Young
South Shields	Craig Robinson	Emma Lewell-Buck	Jonathan Aibi	Stephen William Holt	David Francis		Ahmed Khan (Independent)	Labour	Emma Lewell-Buck
Stockton North	Niall Innes	Chris McDonald	Jo Barton	John Gerard McDermottroe	Sam Bradford			Labour	Alex Cunningham
Stockton West	Matt Vickers	Joe Dancey	Nigel Frederick Boddy	Stephen Matthews	Anna-Maria Toms		Monty Brack (Independents for Direct Democracy); Vivek Chhabra (Independent); Niko Omilana (Independent); Mohammed Zaroof (Independent)	Conservative	Matt Vickers
Sunderland Central	Gregory Peacock	Lewis Atkinson	Niall Hodson	Chris Eynon	Rachel Featherstone			Labour	Julie Elliott
Tynemouth	Lewis Bartoli	Alan Campbell	John Appleby	Rosalyn Elliot	Chloe-Louise Fawcett Reilly		Christopher Greener (Independent); Mustaque Rahman (Independent); Adam Thewlis (Heritage); Kelly Jane Oliver Dougall (Party of Women)	Labour	Alan Campbell
Washington and Gateshead South	Shaun Parsons	Sharon Hodgson	Ciaran Morrissey	Paul Donaghy	Michal Chantkowski		Sharon McLafferty (Independent)	Labour	Sharon Hodgson

== North West England ==
Bold meant the candidate was elected.

Constituency	Conservative	Labour	Liberal Democrats	Reform UK	Green Party	Others	Incumbent	
Altrincham and Sale West	Oliver Carroll	Connor Rand	Jane Brophy (Note: An MEP for North West England (2019–2020))	Paul Swansborough	Geraldine Coggins		Conservative	Graham Brady
Ashton-under-Lyne	Lizzie Hacking	Angela Rayner	Dominic Hardwick	Robert Barrowcliffe	Lee Huntbach	Aroma Hassan (Workers)	Labour	Angela Rayner
Barrow and Furness	Simon Fell	Michelle Scrogham	Adrian Waite	Barry Morgan	Lorraine Wrennall		Conservative	Simon Fell
Birkenhead	Sarah Payne	Alison McGovern (Note: Incumbent MP for the abolished Wirral South, contesting Birkenhead)	Stuart Kelly	Tony Stanley	Jo Bird		Labour	Mick Whitley
Blackburn	Jamie McGowan	Kate Hollern	Adam Waller-Slack	Tommy Temperley	Denise Morgan	Craig Murray (Workers); Adnan Hussain (Independent)	Labour	Kate Hollern
Blackley and Middleton South	Iftikhar Ahmed	Graham Stringer	Iain Donaldson	Alison Devine	Dylan Lewis-Creser		Labour	Graham Stringer
Blackpool North and Fleetwood	Paul Maynard	Lorraine Beavers	Bill Greene	Dan Barker	Tina Rothery	Jeannine Cresswell (SDP)	Conservative	Paul Maynard
Blackpool South	Zak Khan	Chris Webb	Andy Cregan	Mark Butcher	Ben Thomas	Kim Knight (Alliance for Democracy and Freedom)	Labour	Chris Webb (Note: Elected in a by-election)
Bolton North East	Adele Warren	Kirith Entwistle	Rebecca Forrest	Trevor Jones	Hanif Alli		Conservative	Mark Logan
Bolton South and Walkden	Mohammed Afzal	Yasmin Qureshi	Gemma-Jane Bowker	Julie Pattison	Philip Kochitty	Jack Khan (Workers)	Labour	Yasmin Qureshi
Bolton West	Chris Green	Phil Brickell	Donald McIntosh	Dylan Evans	Vicki Attenborough		Conservative	Chris Green
Bootle	Rowena Bass	Peter Dowd	John Gibson	Darren Burns	Neil Doolin	Ian Smith (Workers)	Labour	Peter Dowd
Burnley	Antony Higginbotham	Oliver Ryan	Gordon Birtwistle (Note: Was MP for the seat from 2010 to 2015)	Nathan Thomas McCollum	Scott Cunliffe		Conservative	Antony Higginbotham
Bury North	James Daly	James Frith (Note: Was MP for the seat from 2017 to 2019)	Mark Alcock	Lynda Rosewell	Owain Sutton	Shafat Ali (Workers)	Conservative	James Daly
Bury South	Arnie Saunders	Christian Wakeford (Note: Elected in 2019 as a Conservative; crossed the floor in January 2022)	Andrew Page	Jeff Armstrong	Michael Welton	Dan Ross (CPB)	Labour (elected as Conservative)	Christian Wakeford
Carlisle	John Stevenson	Julie Minns	Brian Wernham	Stephen Ward	Gavin Hawkton	Rachel Hayton (SDP)	Conservative	John Stevenson
Cheadle	Mary Robinson	Kelly Fowler	Tom Morrison	Stephen George Speakman	Alex Drury	Tanya Manzoor (Workers)	Conservative	Mary Robinson
Chorley	Not contesting				Mark Tebbutt	Lindsay Hoyle (Speaker); Martin Powell-Davies (TUSC)	Speaker	Lindsay Hoyle
Chester North and Neston	Simon Eardley	Samantha Dixon	Stephen Gribbon	Nicholas William Sean Goulding	Nick Brown		Labour	Samantha Dixon (Note: Elected in a by-election)
Congleton	Fiona Bruce	Sarah Russell	Paul Duffy	Martin York	Rich McCarthy	Rob Moreton (Independent)	Conservative	Fiona Bruce
Crewe and Nantwich	Ben Fletcher	Connor Naismith	Matt Theobald	Matthew Wood	Te Ata Browne		Conservative	Kieran Mullan Stood in Bexhill and Battle
Chester South and Eddisbury	Aphra Brandreth	Angeliki Stogia	Rob Herd	Peter Langley	Steve Davies		Conservative	Edward Timpson
Mid Cheshire	Charles Fifield	Andrew Cooper	Jack Price-Harbach	Emma Guy	Mark Green		Conservative	New seat
Runcorn and Helsby	Jade Marsden	Mike Amesbury	Chris Rowe	Jason Moorcroft	Chris Copeman	Paul Murphy (SDP)	Labour	Mike Amesbury
Ellesmere Port and Bromborough	Lee Evans	Justin Madders	Chris Carubia	Nick Goulding	Harry Gorman		Labour	Justin Madders
Fylde	Andrew Snowden	Tom Calver	Mark Jewell	Brook Wimbury	Brenden Wilkinson		Independent (elected as Conservative)	Mark Menzies
Widnes and Halewood	Sean Houlston	Derek Twigg	David Coveney	Jake Fraser	Nancy Mills	Michael Murphy (Workers)	Labour	Derek Twigg
Hazel Grove	Paul Athans	Claire Vibert	Lisa Smart	John Kelly	Graham Reid	Tim O'Rourke (Workers)	Independent (elected as Conservative)	William Wragg
Heywood and Middleton North	Laura-Beth Thompson	Elsie Blundell	Tom Shaw	Steve Potter	endorsed independent Chris Furlong	Chris Furlong (Independent)	Conservative	Chris Clarkson
Hyndburn	Sara Britcliffe	Sarah Smith	Beth Waller-Slack	Richard Oakley	Mohammed Fazal		Conservative	Sara Britcliffe
Knowsley	Sherrie McDaid	Anneliese Midgley	Kate Tipton	Alex Hitchmough	Graham Wickens	Patricia Jameson (SDP)	Labour	George Howarth
Lancaster and Wyre	Peter Cartridge	Cat Smith	Matt Severn	Nigel Alderson	Jack Lenox		Labour	Cat Smith
Leigh and Atherton	Michael Winstanley	Jo Platt (Note: Was MP for Leigh from 2017 to 2019)	Stuart Thomas	George Woodward	Amelia Jones		Conservative	James Grundy
Liverpool Garston	Danny Bowman	Maria Eagle	John Hyland	Kiera Alice Hubbard	Muryam Sheikh	Sam Gorst (Liverpool Community Independents)	Labour	Maria Eagle
Liverpool Riverside	Jane Austin	Kim Johnson	Rebecca Turner	Gary Hincks	Chris Coughlan	Roger Bannister (TUSC); Stephen McNally (National Health Action Party; Sean Weaver (Liberal Party)	Labour	Kim Johnson
Liverpool Walton	Emma Ware	Dan Carden	Sean Cadwallader	Joseph Doran	Martyn Madeley	Billy Lake (Liberal Party)	Labour	Dan Carden
Liverpool Wavertree	Charlotte Eagar	Paula Barker	Rob McAllister-Bell	Adam Heatherington	Tom Crone	Ann San (Independent)	Labour	Paula Barker
Liverpool West Derby	Charlotte Duthie	Ian Byrne	Kayleigh Halpin	Jack Frederick Boyd	Maria Coughlan	Steve Radford (Liberal Party)	Labour	Ian Byrne
Macclesfield	David Rutley	Tim Roca	Neil Christian	Stephen Broadhurst	Amanda Iremonger	Dickie Fletcher (SDP)	Conservative	David Rutley
Makerfield	Simon Finkelstein	Josh Simons	John Skipworth	Robert Kenyon	Maria Deery		Labour	Yvonne Fovargue
Gorton and Denton	Ruth Welsh	Andrew Gwynne	John Reid	Lee Moffitt	Amanda Gardner		Labour	Andrew Gwynne
Manchester Rusholme	Alexandra Marsanu	Afzal Khan	not contesting	Joel Patrick McGuigan	Thirza Asanga-Rae		Labour	Afzal Khan
Manchester Central	Scott Smith	Lucy Powell	Chris Northwood	David Brown	Ekua Bayunu	Sebastian Moore (SDP)	Labour	Lucy Powell
Manchester Withington	Sarah Garcia de Bustos	Jeff Smith	Richard Kilpatrick	Gary Carp	Sam Easterby-Smith	Wendy Andrew (SDP)	Labour	Jeff Smith
Morecambe and Lunesdale	David Morris	Lizzi Collinge	Peter Jackson	Barry Parsons	Gina Dowding		Conservative	David Morris
Oldham East and Saddleworth	Tom Fish	Debbie Abrahams	Sam Al-Hamdani	Jacob Barden	Fesl Reza-Khan	Shanaz Siddique (Workers); Nick Buckley (Independent); Paul Boots Errock (Independent)	Labour	Debbie Abrahams
Oldham West, Chadderton and Royton	Horatio Lovering	Jim McMahon	Hannah Kitching	David Silbiger	Samsuzzaman Syed	Raja Miah (Independent)	Labour	Jim McMahon
Pendle and Clitheroe	Andrew Stephenson	Jonathan Hinder	Anna Fryer	Victoria Fletcher	Lex Kristan		Conservative	Andrew Stephenson
Penrith and Solway	Mark Jenkinson	Markus Campbell-Savours	Julia Aglionby	Matthew Moody	Susan Denham-Smith	Shaun Long (SDP)	Conservative	Mark Jenkinson
Penrith and Solway	Mark Jenkinson	Markus Campbell-Savours	Julia Aglionby	Matthew Moody	Susan Denham-Smith	Shaun Long (SDP)	Conservative	Neil Hudson
Preston	Trevor Hart	Mark Hendrick	Neil Darby	James Elliot	Isabella Metcalf-Riener	Michael Lavalette (Independent)	Labour	Mark Hendrick
Ribble Valley	Nigel Evans	Maya Ellis	John Potter	John Anthony Carroll	Caroline Montague		Conservative	Nigel Evans
Rochdale	Paul Ellison	Paul Waugh	Andy Kelly	Michael Howard	Martyn Savin	George Galloway (Workers)	Workers	George Galloway (Note: Elected in a by-election)
Rossendale and Darwen	Jake Berry	Andy MacNae	Rowan Fitton	Daniel Matchett	Bob Bauld		Conservative	Jake Berry
Salford	Hillary Scott	Rebecca Long-Bailey	Jake Austin	Craig Birtwhistle	David Henry	Stephen Lewthwaite (SDP)	Labour	Rebecca Long-Bailey
Sefton Central	Marcus Bleasdale	Bill Esterson	Gareth Lloyd-Johnson	Nagender Chindam	Kieran Dams		Labour	Bill Esterson
South Ribble	Katherine Fletcher	Paul Foster	Angela Turner	Andy Hunter	Stephani Mok		Conservative	Katherine Fletcher
Southport	Damien Moore	Patrick Hurley	Erin Harvey	Andrew Lynn	Edwin Black	Sean Halsall (Independent)	Conservative	Damien Moore
St Helens North	Jayne Rear	David Baines	Pat Moloney	Malcolm Webster	Daniel Thomas		Independent (elected as Labour)	Conor McGinn
St Helens South and Whiston	Emma Ellison	Marie Rimmer	Brian Spencer	Raymond Michael Peters	Terence Price		Labour	Marie Rimmer
Stalybridge and Hyde	Phil Chadwick	Jonathan Reynolds	Jamie Dwan	Barbara Kaya	Robert Hodgetts-Haley	Audel Shirin (Workers)	Labour	Jonathan Reynolds
Stockport	Oliver Johnstone	Navendu Mishra	Wendy Meikle	Lynn Schofield	Helena Mellish	Ayesha Khan (Workers)	Labour	Navendu Mishra
Stretford and Urmston	Mark Cornes	Andrew Western	Mark Clayton	Charlotte Patricia Faulkner	Dan Jerrome	Kalima Choudhury (Workers)	Labour	Andrew Western (Note: Elected in a by-election)
Tatton	Esther McVey	Ryan Jude	Jonathan Smith	Simon Moorehead	Nigel Hennerley		Conservative	Esther McVey
Wallasey	Robbie Lammas	Angela Eagle	Vicky Downie	David Burgess-Joyce	Jane Turner		Labour	Angela Eagle
Warrington North	Yasmin Al-Atroshi	Charlotte Nichols	David Crowther	Trevor Nicholls	Hannah Spencer	Maddison Wheeldon (Independent)	Labour	Charlotte Nichols
Warrington South	Andy Carter	Sarah Hall	Graham Gowland	Janet Barbara Balfe	Steph Davies	Graeme Kelly (SDP)	Conservative	Andy Carter
West Lancashire	Mike Prendergast	Ashley Dalton (Note: Elected in a by-election)	Graham Smith	Simon Evans	Charlotte Houltram		Labour	Ashley Dalton (Note: Elected in a by-election)
Westmorland and Lonsdale	Matty Jackman	Pippa Smith	Tim Farron	James Townley	Phil Clayton	Wendy Long (SDP)	Liberal Democrats	Tim Farron
Whitehaven and Workington	Andrew Johnson	Josh MacAlister	Chris Wills	David Surtees	Jill Perry		Conservative	Trudy Harrison
Wigan	Henry Mitson	Lisa Nandy	Brian Crombie-Fisher	Andy Dawber	Jane Leicester		Labour	Lisa Nandy
Wirral West	Jenny Johnson	Matthew Patrick	Peter Reisdorf	Ken Ferguson	Gail Jenkinson		Labour	Margaret Greenwood
Worsley and Eccles	Bradley Mitchell	Michael Wheeler	Jemma De Vincenzo	Craig Thomas Birtwistle	David Jones	Nasri Barghouti (Workers)	Labour	Barbara Keeley
Wythenshawe and Sale East	Sarah Beament	Mike Kane	Simon Lepori	Julie Fousert	Melanie Earp	Hilary Salt (SDP)	Labour	Mike Kane

== Scotland ==
Bold meant the candidate was elected.

Constituency	Conservative	Labour	Liberal Democrats	Reform UK	Scottish Greens	SNP	Others	Incumbent	
Aberdeen North	Gillian Tebberen	Lynn Thomson	Desmond Bouse	Kenneth Leggat	Esme Houston	Kirsty Blackman	Charlie Abel (Alba); Lucas Grant (TUSC); Neil Healy (Workers); Dawn Smith (Scottish Family)	SNP	Kirsty Blackman
Aberdeen South	John Wheeler	Tauqeer Malik	Jeff Goodhall	Michael Pearce	Guy Ingerson	Stephen Flynn	Graeme Craib (Scottish Family); Sophie Molly (Independent)	SNP	Stephen Flynn
Aberdeenshire North and Moray East	Douglas Ross	Andrew Brown	Ian Bailey	Jo Hart		Seamus Logan		Conservative	David Duguid (Banff and Buchan)
Airdrie and Shotts	Alexandra Herdman	Kenneth Stevenson	Lewis Younie	David Hall		Anum Qaisar	John Jo Leckie (British Unionist); Josh Robertson (Alba)	SNP	Anum Qaisar (Note: Elected in a by-election)
Alloa and Grangemouth	Rachel Nunn	Brian Leishman	Adrian May	Richard Fairley	Nariese Whyte	John Nicolson	Eva Comrie (Independent); Tom Flanagan (Workers); Kenny MacAskill (Alba)	SNP	John Nicolson (Ochil and South Perthshire)
Angus and Perthshire Glens	Stephen Kerr (Note: MP for Stirling (2017–2019) and MSP for Central Scotland (since 2021))	Elizabeth Carr-Ellis	Claire McLaren	Kenneth Morton		Dave Doogan	Dan Peña (Independent)	SNP	Dave Doogan (Angus)
Arbroath and Broughty Ferry	Richard Brooks	Cheryl-Ann Cruickshank	David Evans	Gwen Wood		Stephen Gethins (Note: MP for North East Fife from 2015 to 2019)	Moira Brown (Sovereignty); Ghazi Khan (Alba)	SNP	Stewart Hosie (Dundee East)
Argyll, Bute and South Lochaber	Amanda Hampsey	Hamish Maxwell	Alan Reid (Note: MP for Argyll and Bute (2001–2015))	Melanie Hurst		Brendan O'Hara	Tommy Macpherson (Independent)	SNP	Brendan O'Hara (Argyll and Bute)
Ayr, Carrick and Cumnock	Martin Dowey	Elaine Stewart	Paul Kennedy	Andrew Russell	Korin Vallance	Allan Dorans	Corri Wilson (Alba)	SNP	Allan Dorans
Bathgate and Linlithgow	Lynn Munro	Kirsteen Sullivan	Sally Pattle	Jamie McNamee	Simon Jay	Martyn Day	John Hannah (ISP); Stuart McArthur (Independent)	SNP	Martyn Day (Linlithgow and East Falkirk)
Berwickshire, Roxburgh and Selkirk	John Lamont	Caitlin Stott	Ray Georgeson	Carolyn Grant	Neil MacKinnon	David Wilson	Hamish Goldie-Scot (Scottish Family); Ellie Merton (Independent)	Conservative	John Lamont
Caithness, Sutherland and Easter Ross	Fiona Fawcett	Eva Kestner	Jamie Stone	Sandra Skinner	Anne Thomas	Lucy Beattie	Steve Chisholm (Alba)	Liberal Democrats	Jamie Stone
Central Ayrshire	David Rocks	Alan Gemmell	Elaine Ford	Stevie Bates	Tom Kerr	Annie McIndoe	Allan MacMillan (SDP); Louise McDaid (Socialist Labour)	SNP	Philippa Whitford
Coatbridge and Bellshill	Christina Sandhu	Frank McNally	Emma Farthing	Fiona McRae	Patrick McAleer	Steven Bonnar	Drew Gilchrist (CPB); Leo Lanahan (Scottish Family)	SNP	Steven Bonnar (Coatbridge, Chryston and Bellshill)
Cowdenbeath and Kirkcaldy	Johnathan Gray	Melanie Ward	Fraser Graham	Sonia Davidson	Mags Hall	Lesley Backhouse	Neale Hanvey (Alba); Calum Paul (Libertarian)	Alba (elected as SNP)	Neale Hanvey (Kirkcaldy and Cowdenbeath)
Cumbernauld and Kirkintilloch	Satbir Gill	Katrina Murray	Adam Harley	Billy Ross	Anne McCrossan	Stuart McDonald		SNP	Stuart McDonald (Cumbernauld, Kilsyth and Kirkintilloch East)
Dumfries and Galloway	John Cooper	James Wallace	Iain McDonald	Charles Anthony Keal	Laura Moodie	Tracey Little	David Griffiths (Heritage)	Conservative	Alister Jack
Dumfriesshire, Clydesdale and Tweeddale	David Mundell	Daniel Coleman	Drummond Begg	David Kirkwood	Dominic Ashmole	Kim Marshall	Gareth Kirk (Scottish Family)	Conservative	David Mundell
Dundee Central	Emma Farquhar	Richard McCready	Daniel Coleman	Vicky McCann		Chris Law	Susan Ettle (Scottish Family); Jim McFarlane (TUSC); Raymond Mennie (Workers); Niko Omilana (Independent); Alan Ross (Alba)	SNP	Chris Law (Dundee West)
Dunfermline and Dollar	Thomas Heald	Graeme Downie	Lauren Buchanan-Quigley	Udo van den Brock	Ryan Blackadder	Naz Anis Miah	Graham Hadley (Independent); George Morton (Independent); Danny Smith (Scottish Family)	SNP	Douglas Chapman (Dunfermline and West Fife)
East Kilbride and Strathaven	Ross Lambie	Joani Reid	Aisha Mir	David Mills	Ann McGuinness	Grant Costello	Donald Mackay (UKIP); David Richardson (Scottish Family)	Conservative (elected as SNP)	Lisa Cameron (Note: Elected for the SNP, joined the Conservatives in 2023) (East Kilbride, Strathaven and Lesmahagow)
East Renfrewshire	Sandesh Gulhane (Note: MSP for Glasgow since 2021)	Blair McDougall	Alan Grant	Matt Alexander	Karen Sharkey	Kirsten Oswald	Maria Reid (Scottish Family); Allan Steele (Liberal); Colette Walker (ISP)	SNP	Kirsten Oswald
Edinburgh East and Musselburgh	Marie-Clair Munro	Chris Murray	Charles Dundas	Derek Winton	Amanda Grimm	Tommy Sheppard	Jane Gould (Independent)	SNP	Tommy Sheppard (Edinburgh East)
Edinburgh North and Leith	Joanna Mowat	Tracy Gilbert	Mike Andersen	Alan Melville	Kayleigh O'Neill	Deidre Brock	Niel Deepnarain (Scottish Family); David Jacobsen (Socialist Labour); Richard Shillcock (CPB); Caroline Waterloo (Independent)	SNP	Deidre Brock
Edinburgh South	Christopher Cowdy	Ian Murray	Andy Williamson	Cameron Rose	Jo Phillips	Simita Kumar	Phil Holden (Scottish Family); Lynne Lyon (Alba); Alex Martin (Independent); Mark Rowbotham (Independent)	Labour	Ian Murray
Edinburgh South West	Sue Webber	Scott Arthur	Bruce Wilson	Ian Harper	Dan Heap	Joanna Cherry	Richard Lucas (Scottish Family); Marc Wilkinson (Independent)	SNP	Joanna Cherry
Edinburgh West	Alastair Shields	Michael Davidson	Christine Jardine	Otto Inglis	James Puchowski	Euan Hyslop	David Henry (Independent); Nick Hornig (Independent); Tam Laird (Scottish Libertarian)	Liberal Democrats	Christine Jardine
Falkirk	James Bundy	Euan Stainbank	Tim McKay	Keith Barrow	Rachel Kidd	Toni Giugliano	Zohaib Arshad (Alba); Mark Tunnicliff (Independent)	SNP	John McNally
Glasgow East	Thomas Kerr	John Grady	Matthew Clark	Donnie McLeod	Amy Kettyles	David Linden	Liam McLaughlan (SSP)	SNP	David Linden
Glasgow North	Naveed Asghar	Martin Rhodes	Daniel O'Malley	Helen Burns	Iris Duane	Alison Thewliss	Nick Durie (Alba)	SNP	Patrick Grady
Glasgow North	Naveed Asghar	Martin Rhodes	Daniel O'Malley	Helen Burns	Iris Duane	Alison Thewliss	Nick Durie (Alba)	SNP	Alison Thewliss (Glasgow Central)
Glasgow North East	Robert Connelly	Maureen Burke	Sheila Thomson	Jonathan Walmsley	Ewan Lewis	Anne McLaughlin	Catherine McKernan (Alba); Robert Scott (SDP); Chris Sermanni (TUSC); Gary Steele (CPB)	SNP	Anne McLaughlin
Glasgow West	Faten Hameed	Patricia Ferguson (Note: Member of the Scottish Parliament for Glasgow Maryhill and Springburn (2011–2016) and Glasgow Maryhill (1999–2011))	James Calder	Dionne Moore	Nick Quail	Carol Monaghan	John Cormack (Christian)	SNP	Carol Monaghan (Glasgow North West)
Glasgow South	Haroun Malik	Gordon McKee	Peter McLaughlin	Danny Raja	Niall Christie	Stewart McDonald	Dhruva Kumar (Alba); Brian Smith (TUSC)	SNP	Stewart McDonald
Glasgow South West	Mamun Rashid	Zubir Ahmed	Paul McGarry	Morag McRae	John Hamelink	Chris Stephens	Tony Osy (Alba)	SNP	Chris Stephens
Glenrothes and Mid Fife	Debbie MacCallum	Richard Baker	Jill Reilly	Ian Smith		John Beare		SNP	Peter Grant (Glenrothes)
Gordon and Buchan	Harriet Cross	Nurul Hoque Ali	Conrad Wood	Kris Callander		Richard Thomson		SNP	Richard Thomson (Gordon)
Hamilton and Clyde Valley	Richard Nelson	Imogen Walker	Kyle Burns	Lisa Judge		Ross Clark	Christopher Ho (UKIP)	SNP	Angela Crawley (Lanark and Hamilton East)
Inverclyde and Renfrewshire West	Ted Runciman	Martin McCluskey	Ross Stalker	Simon Moorehead	Iain Hamilton	Ronnie Cowan	John Burleigh (Independent); Christopher McEleny (Alba)	SNP	Ronnie Cowan (Inverclyde)
Inverness, Skye and West Ross-shire	Ruraidh Stewart	Michael Perera	Angus MacDonald	Dillan Hill	Peter Newman	Drew Hendry	Darren Paxton (Socialist Equality)	SNP	Drew Hendry (Inverness, Nairn, Badenoch and Strathspey)
Inverness, Skye and West Ross-shire	Ruraidh Stewart	Michael Perera	Angus MacDonald	Dillan Hill	Peter Newman	Drew Hendry	Darren Paxton (Socialist Equality)	SNP	Ian Blackford (Ross, Skye and Lochaber)
Kilmarnock and Loudoun	Jordan Cowie	Lillian Jones	Edward Thornley	William Thomson	Bex Glen	Alan Brown	Stephen McNamara (Independent)	SNP	Alan Brown
Livingston	Damien Doran-Timson	Gregor Poynton	Caron Lindsay	David McLennan	Cameron Glasgow	Hannah Bardell	Debbie Ewan (Alba)	SNP	Hannah Bardell
Lothian East	Scott Hamilton	Douglas Alexander (Note: MP for Paisley and Renfrewshire South (2005–2015) and Paisley South (1997–2005 and is also running under a joint ticket with the Co-operative Party))	Duncan Dunlop	Robert Davies	Shona McIntosh	Lyn Jardine	George Kerevan (Alba)	Alba (elected as SNP)	Kenny MacAskill (East Lothian)
Mid Dunbartonshire	Alix Mathieson	Lorna Dougall	Susan Murray	David McNabb	Carolynn Scrimgeour	Amy Callaghan	Ray James (Alba)	SNP	Amy Callaghan (East Dunbartonshire)
Midlothian	Keith Cockburn	Kirsty McNeill	Ross Laird	Stefan Garbowski		Owen Thompson	Daniel Fraser (Scottish Libertarian)	SNP	Owen Thompson
Moray West, Nairn and Strathspey	Kathleen Robertson	James Hynam	Neil Alexander	Steve Skerrett	Draeyk Van Der Horn	Graham Leadbitter	Euan Morrice (Scottish Family)	Conservative	Douglas Ross (Moray)
Motherwell, Wishaw and Carluke	Oyebola Ajala	Pamela Nash (Note: Member of Parliament for Airdrie and Shotts from 2010 to 2015)	Haley Bennie	Robert MacLaughlan	Gordon Miller	Marion Fellows	Gus Ferguson (British Unionist); Ross Hagen (Scottish Libertarian); Neil Wilson (UKIP)	SNP	Marion Fellows (Motherwell and Wishaw)
Na h-Eileanan an Iar	Kenny Barker	Torcuil Crichton	Jamie Dobson	Tony Ridden		Susan Thomson	Donald Boyd (Christian); Angus MacNeil (Independent); Steven Welsh (Scottish Family)	Independent (elected as SNP)	Angus MacNeil
North Ayrshire and Arran	Todd Ferguson	Irene Campbell	Gillian Cole-Hamilton	Michael Mann	Cara McKee	Patricia Gibson	Ian Gibson (SDP); James McDaid (Socialist Labour)	SNP	Patricia Gibson
North East Fife	Bill Bowman (Note: Member of the Scottish Parliament for North East Scotland from 2016 to 2021)	Jennifer Gallagher	Wendy Chamberlain	Matthew Wren	Morven Ovenstone-Jones	Stefan Hoggan-Radu		Liberal Democrats	Wendy Chamberlain
Orkney and Shetland	Shane Painter	Conor Savage	Alistair Carmichael	Robert Smith	Alex Armitage	Robert Leslie		Liberal Democrats	Alistair Carmichael
Paisley and Renfrewshire North	David McGonigle	Alison Taylor	Grant Toghill	Andrew Scott	Jen Bell	Gavin Newlands		SNP	Gavin Newlands
Paisley and Renfrewshire South	Alec Leishman	Johanna Baxter	Jack Clark	Jim McIlroy	Athol Bond	Jacqueline Cameron	Paul Mack (Independent); Mark Turnbill (Freedom Alliance)	SNP	Mhairi Black
Perth and Kinross-shire	Luke Graham (Note: MP for Ochil and South Perthshire from 2017 to 2019)	Graham Cox	Amanda Clark	Helen McDade		Pete Wishart	Sally Hughes (Independent)	SNP	Pete Wishart (Perth and North Perthshire)
Rutherglen	Gary Burns	Michael Shanks	Gloria Adebo	David Stark		Katy Loudon	Bill Bonnar (SSP); Andrew Daly (Independent); Jim Eadie (Alba); John McArthur (Scottish Family)	Labour	Michael Shanks (Note: Elected in a by-election) (Rutherglen and Hamilton West)
Stirling and Strathallan	Neil Benny	Chris Kane	Hamish Taylor	Bill McDonald	Andrew Adam	Alyn Smith		SNP	Alyn Smith (Stirling)
West Aberdeenshire and Kincardine	Andrew Bowie	Kate Blake	Michael Turvey	Brandon Innes	William Linegar	Glen Reynolds	Irish Leask (Independent); David Neill (Independent)	Conservative	Andrew Bowie
West Dunbartonshire	Maurice Corry	Douglas McAllister	Paul Donald Kennedy	David Smith	Paula Baker	Martin Docherty-Hughes	Andrew Muir (Scottish Family); Kelly Wilson (Sovereignty)	SNP	Martin Docherty-Hughes

== South East England ==
Bold meant the candidate was elected.

Constituency	Conservative	Labour	Liberal Democrats	Reform UK	Green Party	Others	Incumbent	
Aldershot	Leo Docherty	Alex Baker	Paul Harris	Trevor Lloyd-Jones	Ed Neville		Conservative	Leo Docherty
Arundel and South Downs	Andrew Griffith	Chris Philipsborn	Richard Allen	David Thomas	Steve McAuliff		Conservative	Andrew Griffith
Ashford	Damian Green	Sojan Joseph	Adam Rowledge	Tristram Kennedy Harper	Mandy Rossi	James Ransley (Consensus)	Conservative	Damian Green
Aylesbury	Rob Butler	Laura Kyrke-Smith	Steve Lambert	Lesley Taylor	Julie Atkins		Conservative	Rob Butler
Banbury	Victoria Prentis	Sean Woodcock	Liz Adams	Paul Topley	Arron Baker	Declan Soper (SDP) Cassandra Bellingham (Independent)	Conservative	Victoria Prentis
Bicester and Woodstock	Rupert Harrison	Veronica Oakeshott	Calum Miller	Augustine Obodo	Ian Middleton		Conservative	New seat
Basingstoke	Maria Miller	Luke Murphy (politician)	Richard Whelan	withdrew support from their nominated candidate	Michael Howard-Sorrell	Raymond Saint (nominated as Reform)	Conservative	Maria Miller
Beaconsfield	Joy Morrissey	Matt Patterson	Anna Crabtree	John Halsall	Dominick Pegram	Catherine Harker (SDP)	Conservative	Joy Morrissey
Bexhill and Battle	Kieran Mullan	Christine Bayliss	Becky Jones	Ian Gribbin	Jonathan Kent		Conservative	Huw Merriman
Bognor Regis and Littlehampton	Alison Griffiths	Clare Walsh	Henry Jones	Sandra Daniells	Carol Birch		Conservative	Nick Gibb
Bracknell	James Sunderland	Peter Swallow	Katie Mansfield	Justin Bellhouse	Emily Torode	Michael Derrig (SDP)	Conservative	James Sunderland
Brighton Kemptown and Peacehaven	Khobi Vallis	Chris Ward	Stewart Stone		Elaine Hills	Valerie Gray (SDP)	Labour	Lloyd Russell-Moyle (Brighton Kemptown)
Brighton Pavilion	Sarah Webster	Tom Gray	Ashley Ridley	Mark Mulvihill	Siân Berry	Carl Buckfield (SDP)	Green	Caroline Lucas
Buckingham and Bletchley	Iain Stewart	Callum Anderson	Dominic Dyer	Jordan Cattell	Amanda Onwuemene		Conservative	New seat
Canterbury	Louise Harvey-Quirke	Rosie Duffield	Russ Timpson	Bridget Porter	Henry Stanton	Luke Buchanan-Hodgman (SDP)	Labour	Rosie Duffield
Chatham and Aylesford	Nathan Gamester	Tris Osborne	Nick Chan	Thomas Mallon	Kim Winterbottom	Steven Tanner (SDP)	Conservative	Tracey Crouch
Chesham and Amersham	Gareth Williams	Chris Chilton	Sarah Green	Laurence Jarvis	Justine Fulford		Liberal Democrats	Sarah Green (Note: Elected in a by-election)
Chichester	Gillian Keegan	Tom Collinge	Jess Brown-Fuller	Teresa De Santis	Tim Young		Conservative	Gillian Keegan
Crawley	Zack Ali	Peter Lamb		Tim Charters	Iain Dickson		Conservative	Henry Smith
Dartford	Gareth Johnson	Jim Dickson	Kyle Marsh	Lee Stranders	Laura Edie		Conservative	Gareth Johnson
Didcot and Wantage	David Johnston	Mocky Khan	Olly Glover	Steve Beatty	Sam Casey-Rerhaye	Kynaston Pomlett (SDP)	Conservative	David Johnston (Wantage)
Dorking and Horley	Marisa Heath	Nadia Burell	Chris Coghlan	Craig Young	Lisa Scott		Conservative	Paul Beresford (Mole Valley)
Dover and Deal	Stephen James	Mike Tapp	Penelope James	Howard Cox	Christine Oliver	Steve Laws (English Democrats); Geoffrey Lymer (Independent); Ash Payne (Independent); Sylvia Petersen (Heritage); Colin Tasker (Workers); Chris Tough (Independent)	Labour (elected as Conservative)	Natalie Elphicke (Dover)
Earley and Woodley	Pauline Jorgensen	Yuan Yang	Tahir Maher		Gary Shacklady	Alastair Hunter (SDP)	Conservative	New seat
East Grinstead and Uckfield	Mims Davies	Ben Cox	Benedict Dempsey	Nathan Curtis	Christina Coleman	Ian Gibson (Independent)	Conservative	New seat
East Hampshire	Damian Hinds	Lucy Sims	Dominic Martin	Matthew Kellermann	Richard Knight		Conservative	Damian Hinds
East Surrey	Claire Coutinho	Tom Bowell	Claire Malcomson	Chris Scott	Shasha Khan		Conservative	Claire Coutinho
East Worthing and Shoreham	Leila Williams	Tom Rutland	David Batchelor	Lionel Harman	Debbie Woudman		Conservative	Tim Loughton
Eastbourne	Caroline Ansell	Paul Richards	Josh Babarinde	Mark Ashdown	Michael Munson		Conservative	Caroline Ansell
Epsom and Ewell	Mhairi Fraser	Mark Todd	Helen Maguire	Mayuran Senthilnathan	Stephen McKenna	Gina Miller (True and Fair)	Conservative	Chris Grayling
Esher and Walton	John Cope	Yoel Gordon	Monica Harding	Alastair Gray	Maciej Pawlik	Richard Bateson (SDP)	Conservative	Dominic Raab
East Thanet	Helen Harrison	Polly Billington	Jai Singh	Paul Webb	Steve Roberts		Conservative	Craig Mackinlay (South Thanet)
Eastleigh	Samuel Joynson	Daniel Shearer	Liz Jarvis	Clare Fawcett	Ben Parry		Conservative	Paul Holmes
Fareham and Waterlooville	Suella Braverman	Gemma Furnivall	Paul Gray	Kevan Chippindall-Higgin	Baz Marie		Conservative	Flick Drummond (Note: Was not reselected as the candidate in the new seat of Fareham and Waterlooville but was selected for Winchester) (Meon Valley)
Farnham and Bordon	Gregory Stafford	Alex Just	Khalil Yousuf	Ged Hall	Claire Matthes		Conservative	Jeremy Hunt (Note: Stood in South West Surrey's other successor constituency, Godalming and Ash) (South West Surrey)
Faversham and Mid Kent	Helen Whately	Mel Dawkins	Hannah Perkin	Maxwell Harrison	Hannah Temple	Lawrence Rustem (British Democrats)	Conservative	Helen Whately
Folkestone and Hythe	Damian Collins	Tony Vaughan	Larry Ngan	William Wright	Marianne Brett		Conservative	Damian Collins
Gillingham and Rainham	Rehman Chishti	Naushabah Khan	Stuart Bourne	Rizvi Rawoof	Kate Belmonte	Peter Wheeler (SDP)	Conservative	Rehman Chishti
Godalming and Ash	Jeremy Hunt	James Walsh	Paul Follows	Graham Drage	Steve Williams		Conservative	New seat
Gosport	Caroline Dinenage	Edward Batterbury	Tim Bearder	Matt Mulliss	Tony Sudworth	Lisa Englefield (Heritage); Jeff Roberts (Independent); Dave Watson (Hampshire Independents)	Conservative	Caroline Dinenage
Gravesham	Adam Holloway	Lauren Sullivan	Ukonu Obasi	Matthew Fraser Moat	Rebecca Drake Hopkins		Conservative	Adam Holloway
Guildford	Angela Richardson	Sarah Gillinson	Zöe Franklin	Dennis Saunders	Sam Peters		Conservative	Angela Richardson
Hamble Valley	Paul Holmes	Devina Paul	Prad Bains	Caroline Gladwin	Kate Needham		Conservative	Suella Braverman (Note: Selected for Fareham's other successor seat Fareham and Waterlooville) (Fareham)
Hastings and Rye	Sally-Ann Hart	Helena Dollimore	Guy Harris	Lucian Fernando	Becca Horn		Conservative	Sally-Ann Hart
Havant	Alan Mak	Stefanie Harvey	Gayathri Sathyanath	John Perry	Netty Shepherd		Conservative	Alan Mak
Henley and Thame	Caroline Newton	Nanda Manley-Browne	Freddie Van Mierlo	Peter Shields	Jo Robb		Conservative	John Howell (Henley)
Herne Bay and Sandwich	Roger Gale	Helen Whitehead	Angie Curwen	Amelia Randall	Thea Barrett		Conservative	Roger Gale (North Thanet)
Horsham	Jeremy Quin	James Field	John Milne	Hugo Miller	Catherine Ross	Paul Abbott (SDP) Jim Duggan (Peace Party (UK)	Conservative	Jeremy Quin
Hove and Portslade	Carline Deal	Peter Kyle	Michael Wang	Martin Hess	Sophie Broadbent	Tanushka Marah (Independent)	Labour	Peter Kyle (Hove)
Isle of Wight East	Joe Robertson	Emily Brothers	Michael Lilley	Sarah Morris	Vix Lowthion	Rachel Thacker (Alliance for Democracy and Freedom)	Conservative	Bob Seely (Isle of Wight)
Isle of Wight West	Bob Seely	Richard Quigley	Nick Stuart	Ian Pickering	Cameron Palin		Conservative	Bob Seely (Isle of Wight)
Lewes	Maria Caulfield	Danny Sweeney	James MacCleary	Bernard Brown	Paul Keene		Conservative	Maria Caulfield
Maidenhead	Tania Mathias	Jo Smith	Joshua Reynolds	Barry Parker	Andrew Cooney	Timothy Burt (SDP)	Conservative	Theresa May
Maidstone and Malling	Helen Grant	Maureen Cleator	Dave Naghi	Paul Thomas	Stuart Jeffery	Mark Alexander (SDP) Gary Butler (British Democrats)	Conservative	Helen Grant (Maidstone and The Weald)
Mid Buckinghamshire	Greg Smith (Note: This constituency has 2 candidates with identical names who are different people, this Greg Smith is the Conservative candidate who was also MP (2019–24) for the since-abolished constituency of Buckingham, a predecessor constituency to this constituency)	Carissma Griffiths	Anja Schaefer	Stephanie Harwood	Greg Smith (Note: This constituency has 2 candidates with identical names who are different people, this Greg Smith is the Green Party candidate)	Yvonne Wilding (SDP)	Conservative	Greg Smith (Buckingham)
Mid Sussex	Kristy Adams	Dave Rowntree	Alison Bennett	Gary Johnson	Deanna Nicholson		Conservative	Mims Davies
Milton Keynes North	Ben Everitt	Chris Curtis	Clare Tevlin	Jane Duckworth	Alan Francis		Conservative	Ben Everitt
Milton Keynes Central	Johnny Luk	Emily Darlington	James Cox	David Reilly	Frances Bonney		Conservative	Iain Stewart (Milton Keynes South)
New Forest East	Julian Lewis	Sasjkia Otto	Caroline Rackham	Roy Swales	Simon King		Conservative	Julian Lewis
New Forest West	Desmond Swayne	Sally Johnston	Jack Davies	Reginald Chester-Sterne	Anna Collar	Paul Simon (SDP)	Conservative	Desmond Swayne
Newbury	Laura Farris	Liz Bell	Lee Dillon	Doug Terry	Steve Masters		Conservative	Laura Farris
North East Hampshire	Ranil Jayawardena	Bradley Phillips	Alex Brewer	Paul Morton	Mohamed Miah	Alex Zychowski (Libertarian)	Conservative	Ranil Jayawardena
North West Hampshire	Kit Malthouse	Andy Fitchet	Luigi Gregori	Andrew Meacham	Hina West		Conservative	Kit Malthouse
Oxford East	Louise Brown	Anneliese Dodds	Theo Jupp	Lawrence Haar	Sushila Dhall	Benjamin Adams (SDP); Amir Ali (Independent); Brandon French (Workers Revolutionary); David Henwood (Independent Oxford Alliance); Katherine Longthorp (Party of Women); Zaid Marham Workers); Jabu Nala-Hartley (Independent); Andrew Smith (Rejoin EU)	Labour	Anneliese Dodds
Oxford West and Abingdon	Vinay Raniga	Stephen Webb	Layla Moran	James Gunn	Cheryl Briggs		Liberal Democrats	Layla Moran
Portsmouth North	Penny Mordaunt	Amanda Martin	Simon Dodd	Melvyn Todd	Duncan Robinson		Conservative	Penny Mordaunt
Portsmouth South	Signe Arkell	Stephen Morgan	Charlie Murphy	Mark Zimmer	Elliott Lee	Jacob Short (Portsmouth Independents Party)	Labour	Stephen Morgan
Reading Central	Raj Singh	Matt Rodda	Henry Wright	Andy Williams	Dave McElroy		Labour	Matt Rodda (Reading East)
Reading West and Mid Berkshire	Ross Mackinnon	Olivia Bailey	Helen Belcher	Kate Bosley	Carolyne Culver	Adrian Abbs (Independent)	Conservative	Alok Sharma (Reading West)
Reigate	Rebecca Paul	Stuart Brady	Mark Johnston	George Beglan	Jonathan Essex		Conservative	Crispin Blunt
Rochester and Strood	Kelly Tolhurst	Lauren Edwards	Graham Colley	Daniel Dabin	Cat Jamieson		Conservative	Kelly Tolhurst
Romsey and Southampton North	Caroline Nokes	Christie Lambert	Geoff Cooper	Harry Sheffield	Connor Shaw		Conservative	Caroline Nokes
Runnymede and Weybridge	Ben Spencer	Robert King	Ellen Nicholson	Stewart Mackay	Steve Ringham		Conservative	Ben Spencer
Sevenoaks	Laura Trott	Denise Scott-McDonald	Richard Streatfeild	James Milmine	Laura Manston	Adam Hibbert (SDP)	Conservative	Laura Trott
Sittingbourne and Sheppey	Aisha Cuthbert	Kevin McKenna	Frances Kneller	William Fotheringham-Bray	Samantha Banks	Mike Baldock (Swale Independents)	Conservative	Gordon Henderson
Slough	Moni Nanda	Tan Dhesi	Chelsea Whyte	Robin Jackson	Julian Edmonds	Azhar Chohan (Ind. Network); Diana Coad (Independent); Chandra Muvvala (Independent); Adnan Shabbir (Workers); Jaswinder Singh (Independent); Nick Smith (Heritage)	Labour	Tan Dhesi
Southampton Itchen	Sidney Yankson	Darren Paffey	James Batho	Alexander Culley	Neil Kelly	Declan Clune (TUSC)	Conservative	Royston Smith
Southampton Test	Ben Burcombe-Filer	Satvir Kaur	Thomas Gravatt	John Edwards	Katherine Barbour		Labour	Alan Whitehead
Spelthorne	Lincoln Jopp	Claire Tighe	Harry Boparai	Rory O'Brien	Manu Singh	Alistair Miller (SDP)	Conservative	Kwasi Kwarteng
Surrey Heath	Ed McGuinness	Jess Hammersley-Rich	Al Pinkerton	Samantha Goggin	Jonathan Campbell		Conservative	Michael Gove
Sussex Weald	Nus Ghani	Dipesh Patel	Danielle Newson	David Morgan	Rachel Millward	Stephen Gander (SDP)	Conservative	Nus Ghani (Wealden)
Tonbridge	Tom Tugendhat	Lewis Bailey	John Woollcombe	Teresa Hansford	Anna Cope		Conservative	Tom Tugendhat (Tonbridge and Malling)
Tunbridge Wells	Neil Mahapatra	Hugo Pound	Mike Martin	John Gager	John Hurst	Hassan Kassem (Independent)	Conservative	Greg Clark
Weald of Kent	Katie Lam	Lenny Rolles	John Howson	Daniel Kersten	Kate Walder		Conservative	New seat
Winchester	Flick Drummond (Note: Was MP for Portsmouth South from 2015 to 2017, and incumbent MP for Meon Valley since 2019)	Hannah Dawson	Danny Chambers	Sean Whelan	Lorraine Abraham	Andrew Davis (SDP) Kevin D'Cruze (Independent)	Conservative	Steve Brine
Windsor	Jack Rankin	Pavitar Mann	Julian Tisi	Harl Grewal	Michael Boyle	David Buckley (The Borough First)	Conservative	Adam Afriyie
Witney	Robert Courts	Antonio Weiss	Charlie Maynard	Richard Langridge	Andrew Prosser	Barry Ingleton (independent)	Conservative	Robert Courts
Woking	Jonathan Lord	Ese Erheriene	Will Forster	Richard Barker	Nataly Anderson		Conservative	Jonathan Lord
Wokingham	Lucy Demery	Monica Hamidi	Clive Jones	Colin Wright	Merv Boniface		Conservative	John Redwood
Worthing West	Peter Bottomley	Beccy Cooper	Morag Chugg	Edmund Rooke	Sonya Mallin		Conservative	Peter Bottomley
Wycombe	Steve Baker	Emma Reynolds (Note: Was MP for Wolverhampton North East from 2010 to 2019)	Toni Brodelle	Richard Phoenix	Catherine Bunting	Ed Gemmell (Climate Party) Khalil Ahmed (Workers)	Conservative	Steve Baker

== South West England ==
Bold meant the candidate was elected.

Constituency	Conservative	Labour	Liberal Democrats	Reform UK	Green Party	Others	Incumbent	
Bath	James Wright	Dan Bewley	Wera Hobhouse	Teresa Hall	Dominic Tristram	A.N.ON (no description); Matthew Alford (Workers); Colin Blackburn (Independent); Bill Blockhead (Independent)	Liberal Democrats	Wera Hobhouse
Bournemouth East	Tobias Ellwood	Tom Hayes	Jon Nicholas	Martin Houlden	Joe Salmon	Miles Penn	Conservative	Tobias Ellwood
Bournemouth West	Conor Burns	Jessica Toale	Jeff Hanna	Ben Aston	Darren Jones	David Warden	Conservative	Conor Burns
Bristol East	Dan Conaghan	Kerry McCarthy	Tony Sutcliffe		Ani Stafford-Townsend	Wael Arafat (Independent)Farooq Siddique (Independent)	Labour	Kerry McCarthy
Bristol North East	Rose Hulse	Damien Egan	Louise Harris	Matthew Bamford	Lorraine Francis	Asif Ali (Independent); Dan Smart (TUSC); Tommy Trueman (SDP)	Labour	Damien Egan (Note: Elected in a by-election) (Kingswood)
Bristol North West	withdrew support from their nominated candidate	Darren Jones	Caroline Gooch	Scarlett O'Connor	Mary Page	Ben Smith (SDP); Laura Saunders (nominated as Conservative)	Labour	Darren Jones
Bristol South	Liz Brennan	Karin Smyth	Andrew Brown	Richard Visick	Jai Breitnauer	Neil Norton (SDP)	Labour	Karin Smyth
Bristol Central	Samuel Williams	Thangam Debbonaire	Nicholas Coombes	Robert Clarke	Carla Denyer	Kellie-Jay Keen-Minshull (Party of Women)	Labour	Thangam Debbonaire (Bristol West)
Camborne and Redruth	Connor Donnithorne	Perran Moon	Thalia Marrington	Roger Tarrant	Catherine Hayes	Robert Hawkins (Socialist Labour); Paul Holmes (Liberal Party)	Conservative	George Eustice
Central Devon	Mel Stride	Ollie Pearson	Mark Wooding	Jeffrey Leeks	Gill Westcott	Arthur Price (Independent)	Conservative	Mel Stride
Cheltenham	Alex Chalk	Lara Chaplin	Max Wilkinson		Daniel Wilson	Daud McDonald (Independent)	Conservative	Alex Chalk
Chippenham	Nic Puntis	Ravi Venkatesh	Sarah Gibson	Ben Ginsburg	Declan Baseley	Ed Deedigan (Independent)	Conservative	Michelle Donelan
Christchurch	Christopher Chope	Joanna Howard	Mike Cox	Robin Adamson	Susan Graham	Simon McCormack (Independent); Trevor ParsonsSasha Jolliffe Yasawi (Animal Welfare)	Conservative	Christopher Chope
East Wiltshire	Danny Kruger	Rob Newman	David Kinnaird	Stephen Talbot	Emily Herbert	Pete Force-Jones (True and Fair)	Conservative	Danny Kruger (Devizes)
Exmouth and Exeter East	David Reed	Helen Dallimore	Paul Arnott	Garry Sutherland	Olly Davey	Mark Baldwin (Climate); Peter Faithfull (Independent); Dan Wilson (Independent)	Conservative	Simon Jupp (East Devon)
Honiton and Sidmouth	Simon Jupp (Note: Incumbent MP for East Devon, 26% of which becomes part of the new Honiton and Sidmouth)	Jake Bonetta	Richard Foord	Paul Quickenden	Henry Gent	Vanessa Coxon (Independent); Hazel Exon (Party of Women)	Liberal Democrats	Richard Foord (Note: Elected in a by-election) (Tiverton and Honiton)
Tiverton and Minehead	Ian Liddell-Grainger (Note: Incumbent MP for Bridgwater and West Somerset, 33% of which becomes part of the new Tiverton and Minehead)	Jonathan Barter	Rachel Gilmour	Frederick Keen	Laura Buchanan		Conservative	New seat
Bridgwater	Ashley Fox	Leigh Redman	Claire Sully	William Frederick Fagg	Charlie Graham	Pelé Barnes (Independent); Gregory Tanner (Workers)	Conservative	Ian Liddell-Grainger (Bridgwater and West Somerset)
Exeter	Tessa Tucker	Steve Race (politician)	Will Aczel	William Petty	Andrew Bell	William Poulter (Independent); Robert Spain (Independent)	Labour	Ben Bradshaw
Filton and Bradley Stoke	Jack Lopresti	Claire Hazelgrove	Benet Allen	Gareth Watson	James Nelson		Conservative	Jack Lopresti
Forest of Dean	Mark Harper	Matt Bishop (politician)	James Joyce	Stanley Goodin	Chris McFarling	Saiham Sikder (Socialist Labour)	Conservative	Mark Harper
Frome and East Somerset	Lucy Trimnell	Robin Moss	Anna Sabine	David Swain	Martin Dimery	Gavin Heathcote (Independent); Shaun Hughes (Independent)	Conservative	New seat
Glastonbury and Somerton	Faye Purbrick	Hal Hooberman	Sarah Dyke	Tom Carter	Jon Cousins		Liberal Democrats	Sarah Dyke (Note: Elected in a by-election) (Somerton and Frome)
Gloucester	Richard Graham	Alex McIntyre	Rebecca Trimnell	Chris Farmer	Adam Shearing	Akhlaque Ahmed (Socialist Labour); Steve Gower (Workers)	Conservative	Richard Graham
Melksham and Devizes	Michelle Donelan	Kerry Postlewhite	Brian Mathew	Malcolm Cupis	Catherine Read		Conservative	New seat
Mid Dorset and North Poole	Michael Tomlinson	Candice Johnson-Cole	Vikki Slade		Ben Pantling	John Dowling (SDP)	Conservative	Michael Tomlinson
Newton Abbot	Anne Marie Morris	Jacob Cousens	Martin Wrigley	Christopher Hilditch	Pauline Wynter	Annaliese Cude (Volt); Liam Mullone (South Devon Alliance); Andre Sabine (Heritage)	Conservative	Anne Marie Morris
North Cornwall	Scott Mann	Robyn Harris	Ben Maguire	Rowland O'Connor	Lance Symonds	Sarah Farrell (Heritage)	Conservative	Scott Mann
North Cotswolds	Geoffrey Clifton-Brown	Anna Mainwaring	Paul Hodgkinson	Jason Preece	Chloe Turner	Jean Blackbeard (Independent)	Conservative	Geoffrey Clifton-Brown (The Cotswolds)
North Devon	Selaine Saxby	Nicky Edwards	Ian Roome	Nigel James	Cassius Lay	Steve Cotten (Independent)	Conservative	Selaine Saxby
North Dorset	Simon Hoare	James Coldwell	Gary Jackson	Ash Leaning	Ken Huggins	Si Adams (Independent); Jeff Taylor (UKIP); Daniel Woodruffe (SDP)	Conservative	Simon Hoare
North East Somerset and Hanham	Jacob Rees-Mogg	Dan Norris (Note: Was MP for Wansdyke from 1997 to 2010)	Dine Romero	Paul MacDonnell	Edmund Cannon	Barmy Brunch (Official Monster Raving Loony); Nicholas Hales (Independent)	Conservative	Jacob Rees-Mogg (North East Somerset)
North Somerset	Liam Fox	Sadik Al-Hassan	Ashley Cartman	Alexander Kokkinoftas	Oscar Livesey Lodwick	Suneil Basu (Workers)	Conservative	Liam Fox
Plymouth Moor View	Johnny Mercer	Fred Thomas	Sarah Martin	Shaun Hooper	Shayna Newham-Joynes		Conservative	Johnny Mercer
Plymouth Sutton and Devonport	Gareth Streeter	Luke Pollard	Holly Greenberry-Pullen	Peter Gold	Cam Hayward	Robert Hawkins (Socialist Labour); Guy HaywoodChaz Singh (Independent)	Labour	Luke Pollard
Poole	Robert Syms	Neil Duncan-Jordan	Oliver Walters	Andrei Dragotoniu	Sarah Ward	Leanne Barnes (UKIP); Joe Cronin (Independent)	Conservative	Robert Syms
Salisbury	John Glen	Matt Aldridge	Victoria Charleston	Julian Malins	Barney Norris	Chris Harwood (Climate); Arthur Pendragon (Independent)	Conservative	John Glen
South Cotswolds	James Gray	Zoe Billingham	Roz Savage	Desi Latimer	Bob Eastoe	Martin Broomfield, Chris Twells (Liberal Party)	Conservative	James Gray (North Wiltshire)
South Devon	Anthony Mangnall	Daniel Steel	Caroline Voaden (Note: Was MEP for South West England from 2019 to 2020)	Michael Bagley	Robert Bagnall	Becca Collings (Heritage)	Conservative	Anthony Mangnall (Totnes)
South Dorset	Richard Drax	Lloyd Hatton	Matt Bell	Morgan Tara Young	Catherine Bennett	Giovanna Lewis (Independent); Rosie Morrell (Independent); Joy Wilson (Independent)	Conservative	Richard Drax
South East Cornwall	Sheryll Murray	Anna Gelderd	Colin Martin	Paul Wadley	Martin Corney	Graham Cowdry (Heritage)	Conservative	Sheryll Murray
South West Devon	Rebecca Smith	Sarah Allen	Julian Brazil	Stephen Horner	Georgia Nelson	Ben Davy (TUSC); Darryl Ingram (Heritage); Alan Spencer (Independent)	Conservative	Gary Streeter
South West Wiltshire	Andrew Murrison	Evelyn Akoto	Bret Palmer	Garry Irvin	Fay Whitfield	Thomas Culshaw (Independent); James Ward (Independent)	Conservative	Andrew Murrison
St Austell and Newquay	Steve Double	Noah Law	Joanna Kenny	Stephen Beal	Amanda Pennington	Jay Latham (Liberal Party); Angie Rayner (Independent)	Conservative	Steve Double
St Ives	Derek Thomas	Filson Ali	Andrew George (Note: Was MP for St Ives from 1997 to 2015)	Giane Mortimer	Ian Flindall	John Harris (The Common People); Dave Laity (Independent); Paul Nicholson (Liberal Party); Jason Saunders (UKIP)	Conservative	Derek Thomas
Stroud	Siobhan Baillie	Simon Opher	George James	Christopher Lester	Pete Kennedy	Jason Hughes (Volt); Saskia Whitfield (Independent)	Conservative	Siobhan Baillie
Swindon North	Justin Tomlinson	Will Stone	Flo Clucas	Les Willis	Andy Bentley	Debbie Hicks (Independent); Scott Hunter (TUSC)	Conservative	Justin Tomlinson
Swindon South	Robert Buckland	Heidi Alexander (Note: Was MP for Lewisham East from 2010 to 2018)	Matt McCabe	Catherine Kosidowski	Rod Hebden	Martin Costello (Independent)	Conservative	Robert Buckland
Taunton and Wellington	Rebecca Pow	Brenda Weston	Gideon Amos	Charles Hansard	Ryan Trower	Rochelle Russell (CPB)	Conservative	Rebecca Pow (Taunton Deane)
Tewkesbury	Laurence Robertson	Damola Animashaun	Cameron Thomas	Byron Clifford Davis	Cate Cody	David Nigel Edgar (Christian Peoples Alliance)	Conservative	Laurence Robertson
Thornbury and Yate	Luke Hall	Rob Logan	Claire Young	Andrew Banwell	Alexandra Jenner-Fust		Conservative	Luke Hall
Torbay	Kevin Foster	Chris Wongsosaputro	Steve Darling	Gordon Scott	Charlie West	Paul Moor (Workers)	Conservative	Kevin Foster
Torridge and Tavistock	Geoffrey Cox	Isabel Saxby	Phil Hutty	Andrew Jackson	Judy Maciejowska	Alan Edward Rayner (Independent)	Conservative	Geoffrey Cox (Torridge and West Devon)
Truro and Falmouth	Cherilyn Mackrory	Jayne Kirkham	Ruth Gripper	Steven Rubidge	Karen La Borde	Peter Lawrence (Independent); Peter White (Liberal Party)	Conservative	Cherilyn Mackrory
Wells and Mendip Hills	Meg Powell-Chandler	Joe Joseph	Tessa Munt	Helen Hims	Peter Welsh	Craig Clarke (Independent); Abi McGuire (Independent)	Conservative	James Heappey (Wells)
West Dorset	Chris Loder	Donna Lumsden	Edward Morello		Kelvin Clayton	Oliver Chisholm (no description); Marcus White (no description)	Conservative	Chris Loder
Weston-Super-Mare	John Penrose	Dan Aldridge	Patrick Keating	Richard Pearse	Tom Daw		Conservative	John Penrose
Yeovil	Marcus Fysh	Rebecca Montacute	Adam Dance	Laura Bailhache	Serena Wootton	Steve Ashton (Independent)	Conservative	Marcus Fysh

== Wales ==
Bold meant the candidate was elected.

Constituency	Conservative	Labour	Liberal Democrats	Reform UK	Green Party	Plaid Cymru	Others	Incumbent	
Aberafan Maesteg	Abigail Mainon	Stephen Kinnock	Justin Griffiths	Mark Griffiths	Nigel Hill	Colin Deere	Captain Beany (Independent); Rhiannon Morrissey (Heritage)	Labour	Stephen Kinnock (Aberavon)
Alyn and Deeside	Jeremy Kent	Mark Tami	Richard Marbrow	Vicky Roskams	Karl Macnaughton	Jack Morris	Edwin Duggan (Independent)	Labour	Mark Tami
Bangor Aberconwy	Robin Millar	Claire Hughes	Rachael Roberts	John Clark	Petra Haig	Catrin Wager	Kathrine Jones (Socialist Labour); Steve Marshall (Climate)	Conservative	Robin Millar (Aberconwy)
Blaenau Gwent and Rhymney	Hannah Jarvis	Nick Smith	Jackie Charlton		Anne Baker	Niamh Salkeld	Robert Griffiths (CPB); Yas Iqbal (Workers); Mike Whatley (Independent)	Labour	Nick Smith (Blaenau Gwent)
Brecon, Radnor and Cwm Tawe	Fay Jones	Matthew Dorrance	David Chadwick	Adam Hill	Amerjit Kaur-Dhaliwal	Emily Durrant-Munro	Jonathan Harrington (Abolish); Lady Lily the Pink (Monster Raving Loony)	Conservative	Fay Jones (Brecon and Radnorshire)
Bridgend	Anita Boateng	Chris Elmore	Claire Waller	Caroline Jones	Debra Cooper	Iolo Caudy	Mark John (Independent)	Conservative	Jamie Wallis
Bridgend	Anita Boateng	Chris Elmore	Claire Waller	Caroline Jones	Debra Cooper	Iolo Caudy	Mark John (Independent)	Labour	Chris Elmore (Ogmore)
Caerfyrddin	Simon Hart	Martha O'Neil	Nick Beckett	Bernard Holton	Will Beasley	Ann Davies	Nancy Cole (Women's Equality); David Evans (Workers)	Independent (formerly Plaid Cymru)	Jonathan Edwards (Carmarthen East and Dinefwr)
Caerphilly	Brandon Gorman	Chris Evans (Note: Incumbent MP for Islwyn)	Steve Aicheler	Joshua Kim	Mark Thomas	Lindsay Whittle (Note: Was member of the Welsh Assembly for South Wales East from 2011 to 2016)		Labour	Wayne David
Cardiff East	Beatrice Brandon	Jo Stevens	Rodney Berman	Lee Canning	Sam Coates	Cadewyn Skelley	John Williams (TUSC)	Labour	Jo Stevens (Cardiff Central)
Cardiff North	Joel Williams	Anna McMorrin	Irfan Latif	Lawrence Gwynn	Meg Shepherd-Foster	Malcolm Phillips		Labour	Anna McMorrin
Cardiff South and Penarth	Ellis Smith	Stephen Doughty	Alex Wilson	Simon Llewellyn	Anthony Slaughter	withdrew support from their nominated candidate	Sharifah Rahman (nominated as Plaid Cymru)	Labour	Stephen Doughty
Cardiff West	James Hamblin	Alex Barros-Curtis	Manda Rigby	Peter Hopkins	Jess Ryan	Kiera Marshall	Neil McEvoy (Propel); John Urquhart (Independent); Sean Wesley (Heritage)	Labour	Kevin Brennan
Ceredigion Preseli	Aled Thomas	Jackie Jones (Note: An MEP for Wales (2019–2020))	Mark Williams (Note: Was MP for Ceredigion (2005–2017))	Karl Pollard	Tomos Barlow	Ben Lake	Taghrid Al-Mawed (Workers)	Plaid Cymru	Ben Lake (Ceredigion)
Clwyd East	James Davies	Becky Gittins	Alec Dauncey	Kirsty Walmsley	Lee Lavery	Paul Penlington	Rob Roberts (Independent)	Independent (formerly Conservative)	Rob Roberts (Delyn)
Clwyd North	Darren Millar	Gill German	David Wilkins	Jamie Orange	Martyn Hogg	Paul Rowlinson		Conservative	David Jones (Clwyd West)
Clwyd North	Darren Millar	Gill German	David Wilkins	Jamie Orange	Martyn Hogg	Paul Rowlinson		Conservative	James Davies (Vale of Clwyd)
Dwyfor Meirionnydd	Tomos Day	Joanna Stallard	Phoebe Jenkins	Lucy Murphy	Karl Drinkwater	Liz Saville Roberts	Joan Ginsberg (Heritage)	Plaid Cymru	Liz Saville Roberts
Dwyfor Meirionnydd	Tomos Day	Joanna Stallard	Phoebe Jenkins	Lucy Murphy	Karl Drinkwater	Liz Saville Roberts	Joan Ginsberg (Heritage)	Plaid Cymru	Hywel Williams (Arfon)
Gower	Marc Jenkins	Tonia Antoniazzi	Franck Banza	Catrin Thomas	Chris Evans	Kieran Pritchard	Wayne Erasmus (Independent)	Labour	Tonia Antoniazzi
Llanelli	Charlie Evans	Nia Griffith	Chris Passmore	Gareth Beer	Karen Laurence	Rhodri Davies	Stan Robinson (UKIP)	Labour	Nia Griffith
Merthyr Tydfil and Aberdare	Amanda Jenner	Gerald Jones	Jade Smith	Gareth Thomas	David Griffin	Francis Whitefoot	Anthony Cole (Workers); Bob Davenport (CPB); Lorenzo de Gregori (Independent)	Labour	Gerald Jones (Merthyr Tydfil and Rhymney)
Merthyr Tydfil and Aberdare	Amanda Jenner	Gerald Jones	Jade Smith	Gareth Thomas	David Griffin	Francis Whitefoot	Anthony Cole (Workers); Bob Davenport (CPB); Lorenzo de Gregori (Independent)	Labour	Beth Winter (Cynon Valley)
Mid and South Pembrokeshire	Stephen Crabb	Henry Tufnell	Alistair Cameron	Stuart Marchant	James Purchase	Cris Tomos	Hanna Andersen (Women's Equality); Vusi Siphika (Independent)	Conservative	Simon Hart (Carmarthen West and South Pembrokeshire)
Mid and South Pembrokeshire	Stephen Crabb	Henry Tufnell	Alistair Cameron	Stuart Marchant	James Purchase	Cris Tomos	Hanna Andersen (Women's Equality); Vusi Siphika (Independent)	Conservative	Stephen Crabb (Preseli Pembrokeshire)
Monmouthshire	David TC Davies	Catherine Fookes	William Powell	Max Windsor-Peplow	Ian Chandler	Ioan Bellin	June Davies (True and Fair); Owen Lewis (Independent); Emma Meredith (Heritage)	Conservative	David TC Davies (Monmouth)
Montgomeryshire and Glyndŵr	withdrew support from their nominated candidate	Steve Witherden	Glyn Preston	Oliver Lewis	Jeremy Brignell-Thorp	Elwyn Vaughan	Craig Williams (nominated as Conservative)	Conservative	Craig Williams (Montgomeryshire)
Montgomeryshire and Glyndŵr	withdrew support from their nominated candidate	Steve Witherden	Glyn Preston	Oliver Lewis	Jeremy Brignell-Thorp	Elwyn Vaughan	Craig Williams (nominated as Conservative)	Conservative	Simon Baynes (Note: Baynes was the incumbent MP for Clwyd South in Wales, and stood in North Shropshire in England.) (Clwyd South)
Neath and Swansea East	Samantha Chohan	Carolyn Harris (Note: Incumbent MP for Swansea East)	Helen Clarke	Dai Richards	Jan Dowden	Andrew Jenkins		Labour	Christina Rees (Neath)
Newport East	Rachel Buckler	Jessica Morden	John Miller	Tommy Short	Lauren James	Jonathan Clark	Pippa Bartolotti (Independent); Mike Ford (Heritage)	Labour	Jessica Morden
Newport West and Islwyn	Nick Jones	Ruth Jones	Mike Hamilton	Paul Taylor	Kerry Vosper	Brandon Ham	George Etheridge (Independent)	Labour	Chris Evans (Islwyn)
Newport West and Islwyn	Nick Jones	Ruth Jones	Mike Hamilton	Paul Taylor	Kerry Vosper	Brandon Ham	George Etheridge (Independent)	Labour	Ruth Jones (Newport West)
Pontypridd	Jack Robson	Alex Davies-Jones	David Mathias	Steve Bayliss	Angela Karadog	Wil Rees	Joe Biddulph (Independent); Jonathan Bishop (Independent); Wayne Owen (Independent)	Labour	Alex Davies-Jones
Rhondda and Ogmore	Adam Robinson	Chris Bryant	Gerald Francis	Darren James	Christine Glossop	Owen Cutler		Labour	Chris Bryant (Rhondda)
Swansea West	Tara-Jane Sutcliffe	Torsten Bell	Michael O'Carroll	Patrick Benham-Crosswell	Peter Jones	Gwyn Williams	Gareth Bromhall (TUSC)	Independent (formerly Labour)	Geraint Davies
Swansea West	Tara-Jane Sutcliffe	Torsten Bell	Michael O'Carroll	Patrick Benham-Crosswell	Peter Jones	Gwyn Williams	Gareth Bromhall (TUSC)	Labour	Carolyn Harris (Swansea East)
Torfaen	Nathan Edmunds	Nick Thomas-Symonds	Brendan Roberts	Ian Williams	Philip Davies	Matthew Jones	Nikki Brooke (Heritage); Lee Dunning (Independent)	Labour	Nick Thomas-Symonds
Vale of Glamorgan	Alun Cairns	Kanishka Narayan	Steven Rajam	Toby Rhodes-Matthews	Lynden Mack	Ian Johnson	Stuart Field (Abolish); Steven Sluman (Independent)	Conservative	Alun Cairns
Wrexham	Sarah Atherton	Andrew Ranger	Tim Sly	Charles Dodman	Tim Morgan	Becca Martin	Paul Ashton (Abolish)	Conservative	Sarah Atherton
Ynys Môn	Virginia Crosbie	Ieuan Môn Williams	Leena Farhat	Emmett Jenner	Martin Schwaller	Llinos Medi	Sir Grumpus L Shorticus (Monster Raving Loony); Sam Wood (Libertarian)	Conservative	Virginia Crosbie

== West Midlands ==
Bold meant the candidate was elected.

Constituency	Conservative	Labour	Liberal Democrats	Reform UK	Green Party	Others	Incumbent	
Aldridge-Brownhills	Wendy Morton	Luke John Davies	Ian Garrett	Graham Eardley	Clare Nash	Hamza Ibrahim (Workers)	Conservative	Wendy Morton
Birmingham Edgbaston	Ashvir Sangha	Preet Gill	Colin Green	Joseph Kirby	Nicola Payne	Ammar Waraich (Independent)	Labour	Preet Gill
Birmingham Erdington	Steve Knee	Paulette Hamilton	Farzana Azlam	Jack Brookes	Karen Trench		Labour	Paulette Hamilton (Note: Elected in a by-election)
Birmingham Hall Green and Moseley	Henry Morris	Tahir Ali	Izzy Knowles	Stepehn McBrine	Zain Ahmed	Shakeel Afsar Mohammad Hafeez; Babar Raja (Independent)	Labour	Tahir Ali (Birmingham Hall Green)
Birmingham Hodge Hill and Solihull North	Caroline Clapper	Liam Byrne	Qasim Esak		Imran Khan	James Giles (Workers)	Labour	Liam Byrne (Birmingham Hodge Hill)
Birmingham Ladywood	Shazna Muzammil	Shabana Mahmood	Lee Dargue	Irene Yoong-Henery	Zoe Challenor	Akhmed Yakoob (Workers Party of Britain)	Labour	Shabana Mahmood
Birmingham Northfield	Gary Sambrook	Laurence Turner	Jerry Evans	Stephen Peters	Rob Grant	Ferzana Akram (Workers Party of Britain)	Conservative	Gary Sambrook
Birmingham Perry Barr	Garry Hickton	Khalid Mahmood	Sabah Hamed		Kefentse Dennis	Andy Chaffer (CPB); Ayoub Khan (Independent)	Labour	Khalid Mahmood
Birmingham Selly Oak	Simon Phipps	Alistair Carns	Dave Radcliffe	Erin Crawford	Jane Baston	Kamel Hawwash (Independent)	Labour	Steve McCabe
Birmingham Yardley	Yvonne Clements	Jess Phillips	Roger Harmer	Nora Kamberi	Roxanne Green	Jody McIntyre (Workers)	Labour	Jess Phillips
Bromsgrove	Bradley Thomas	Neena Gill	David Nicholl		Talia Ellis		Conservative	Sajid Javid
Burton and Uttoxeter	Kate Kniveton	Jacob Collier	Sarah Murray	James Bush	Anna Williams Westwood	Zahid Mahmood (Workers)	Conservative	Kate Kniveton (Burton)
Cannock Chase	Amanda Milling	Josh Newbury	Elizabeth Jewkes	Paul Allen	Andrea Muckley		Conservative	Amanda Milling
Coventry East	Sarah Cooper-Lesadd	Mary Creagh (Note: MP for Wakefield (2005 to 2019))	Mike Massimi	Iddrisu Sufyan	Stephen Gray	Paul Bedsen (Workers)	Labour	Colleen Fletcher (Coventry North East)
Coventry North West	Tom Mercer	Taiwo Owatemi	Tom Holder	Holly-Mae Nelson	Esther Reeves		Labour	Taiwo Owatemi
Coventry South	Mattie Heaven	Zarah Sultana	Stephen Richmond	Steve Attridge	Anne Patterson	Mohammed Syed (Workers) Alastair Mellon (SDP)	Labour	Zarah Sultana
Droitwich and Evesham	Nigel Huddleston	Chipilro Kalebe-Nyamongo	Oliver Walker	Sam Bastow	Neil Franks	Andrew Flaxman (SDP)	Conservative	Nigel Huddleston (Mid Worcestershire)
Dudley	Marco Longhi	Sonia Kumar	Ian Flynn	Andrew Southall	Zia Qari	Aftab Hussein (Workers)	Conservative	Marco Longhi (Dudley North)
Halesowen	James Morris	Alex Ballinger	Ryan Priest		Emma Bullard		Conservative	James Morris (Halesowen and Rowley Regis)
Hereford and South Herefordshire	Jesse Norman	Joseph Emmett	Dan Powell	Nigel Ely	Diana Toynbee		Conservative	Jesse Norman
Kenilworth and Southam	Jeremy Wright	Cat Price	Jenny Wilkinson	Jacqui Harris	Alix Dearing		Conservative	Jeremy Wright
Kingswinford and South Staffordshire	Mike Wood	Sally Jane Benton	Gully Bansal		Claire McIlvenna	George Price (Workers)	Conservative	Mike Wood (Dudley South)
Lichfield	Michael Fabricant	Dave Robertson	Paul Ray	Richard Howard	Heather McNeillis		Conservative	Michael Fabricant
Meriden and Solihull East	Saqib Bhatti	Sarah Alan	Sunny Virk	Malcolm Sedgley	Shesh Sheshabhatter		Conservative	Saqib Bhatti (Meriden)
Newcastle-under-Lyme	Simon Tagg	Adam Jogee	Nigel Jones	Neill Walker	Jennifer Hibell		Conservative	Aaron Bell
North Herefordshire	Bill Wiggin	Jon Browning	Cat Hornsey	Andrew Dye	Ellie Chowns		Conservative	Bill Wiggin
North Shropshire	Simon Baynes	Natalie Rowley	Helen Morgan	Mark Whittle	Craig Emery		Liberal Democrats	Helen Morgan (Note: Elected in a by-election)
North Warwickshire and Bedworth	Craig Tracey	Rachel Taylor	Guy Burchett	Paul Hopkins	Alison Wilson		Conservative	Craig Tracey (North Warwickshire)
Nuneaton	Marcus Jones	Jodie Gosling	Joy Salaja	Rob Howard	Keith Kondakor	Khalil Ahmed (Workers)	Conservative	Marcus Jones
Redditch	Rachel Maclean	Chris Bloore	Andrew Fieldsend-Roxborough	Julie Allison	David Thain	Mohammed Amin (Workers)	Conservative	Rachel Maclean
Rugby	Yousef Dahmash	John Slinger	Richard Dickson	Devenne Kedward	Becca Stevenson	Paul Paphiti (Workers)	Conservative	Mark Pawsey
Shrewsbury	Daniel Kawczynski	Julia Buckley	Alex Wagner		Julian Dean		Conservative	Daniel Kawczynski (Shrewsbury and Atcham)
Smethwick	Kate Fairhurst	Gurinder Josan	Oliver Patrick		Rod Macrorie		Labour	John Spellar (Warley)
Solihull West and Shirley	Neil Shastri-Hurst	Deirdre Fox	Ade Adeyemo	Mary McKenna	Max McLoughlin	Julian Knight (Independent)	Conservative	Julian Knight (Solihull)
South Shropshire	Stuart Anderson	Simon Tobias Thomson	Matthew Green	Charles Shackerley-Bennett	Hilary Wendt	Michael Guest (SDP)	Conservative	Philip Dunne (Ludlow)
Stafford	Theo Clarke	Leigh Ingham	Peter Andras	Michael Riley	Scott Spencer	Allan Gray (Workers)	Conservative	Theo Clarke
Staffordshire Moorlands	Karen Bradley	Alastair Watson	Graham Oakes	Dave Poole	Helen Stead		Conservative	Karen Bradley
Stoke-on-Trent Central	Chandra Kanneganti	Gareth Snell	Laura McCarthy	Luke Shenton	Adam Colclough		Conservative	Jo Gideon
Stoke-on-Trent North	Jonathan Gullis	David Williams	Lucy Hurds	Karl Beresford	Josh Harris		Conservative	Jonathan Gullis
Stoke-on-Trent South	Jack Brereton	Allison Gardner	Alec Sandiford	Michael Bailey	Peggy Wiseman		Conservative	Jack Brereton
Stone, Great Wyrley and Penkridge	Gavin Williamson	Jacqueline Brown	Sam Harper-Wallis		Danni Braine	Alexander Bramham (SDP)	Conservative	Bill Cash (Stone)
Stone, Great Wyrley and Penkridge	Gavin Williamson	Jacqueline Brown	Sam Harper-Wallis		Danni Braine	Alexander Bramham (SDP)	Conservative	Gavin Williamson (South Staffordshire)
Stourbridge	Suzanne Webb	Cat Eccles	Chris Bramall	Richard Shaw	Stephen Price		Conservative	Suzanne Webb
Stratford-on-Avon	Chris Clarkson	Seyi Agboola	Manuela Perteghella	James Crocker	Sherron Guise		Conservative	Nadhim Zahawi
Sutton Coldfield	Andrew Mitchell	Rob Pocock	John Sweeney	Mark Hoath	Ben Auton	Wajad Butkey (Workers)	Conservative	Andrew Mitchell
Tamworth	Eddie Hughes (Note: Incumbent MP for Walsall North, contesting Tamworth)	Sarah Edwards	Jed Marson	Ian Cooper	Sue Howarth		Labour	Sarah Edwards (Note: Elected in a by-election)
Telford	Hannah Campbell	Shaun Davies	Joanna McKenna	Alan Adams	John Adams	Allan Bailey (Workers)	Independent (elected as Conservative)	Lucy Allan
The Wrekin	Mark Pritchard	Roh Yakobi	Anthony Lowe		Patrick McCarthy		Conservative	Mark Pritchard
Walsall and Bloxwich	Shannon Lloyd	Valerie Vaz	Patrick Stillman	Elaine Williams	Sadat Hussain		Conservative	Eddie Hughes (Walsall North)
Walsall and Bloxwich	Shannon Lloyd	Valerie Vaz	Patrick Stillman	Elaine Williams	Sadat Hussain		Labour	Valerie Vaz (Walsall South)
Warwick and Leamington	James Uffindell	Matt Western	Louis Adam	Nigel Clarke	Hema Yellapragada		Labour	Matt Western
West Bromwich	Will Goodhand	Sarah Coombes	Parmjit Singh Gill	Ray Nock	Gita Joshi	Rohim Mohammed (Workers)	Conservative	Nicola Richards (West Bromwich East)
Tipton and Wednesbury	Shaun Bailey	Antonia Bance	Mark Rochell	Jack Sabharwal	Mark Redding	Abdul Husen (Workers)	Conservative	Shaun Bailey (West Bromwich West)
West Worcestershire	Harriett Baldwin	Kash Haroon	Dan Boatright	Christopher Edmondson	Natalie McVey		Conservative	Harriett Baldwin
Wolverhampton North East	Jane Stevenson	Sureena Brackenridge	Peter Thornton	Paul Williams	Kwaku Tano-Yeboah		Conservative	Jane Stevenson
Wolverhampton South East	Victoria Wilson	Pat McFadden	Bart Ricketts		Paul Darke		Labour	Pat McFadden
Wolverhampton West	Mike Newton	Warinder Juss	Phillip Howells	Donald Brookes	Andrea Cantrill		Conservative	Stuart Anderson (Wolverhampton South West)
Worcester	Marc Bayliss	Tom Collins (politician)	Mel Allcott		Tor Pingree	Duncan Murray (SDP)	Conservative	Robin Walker
Wyre Forest	Mark Garnier	Vicki Smith	Shazu Miah	Bill Hopkins	John Davis		Conservative	Mark Garnier

== Yorkshire and the Humber ==
Bold meant the candidate was elected.

=== East Yorkshire ===
Constituency	Conservative	Labour	Liberal Democrats	Reform UK	Green Party	Yorkshire Party	SDP	Others	Incumbent	
Beverley and Holderness	Graham Stuart	Margaret Pinder	Denis Healy	Andy Smith	Jonathan Stephenson	George McManus	Chris Collin	John Ottoway (Alliance for Democracy and Freedom)	Conservative	Graham Stuart
Bridlington and The Wolds	Charlie Dewhirst	Sarah Carter	Jayne Phoenix	Maria Bowtell	Gill Leek	Tim Norman	Carlo Verda	Tom Cone (Independent)	Conservative	Greg Knight
Goole and Pocklington	David Davis	Liam Draycott	Dale Needham	Richard Kelly	Angela Stone			Shona Wade (Independent)	Conservative	David Davis
Goole and Pocklington	David Davis	Liam Draycott	Dale Needham	Richard Kelly	Angela Stone			Shona Wade (Independent)	Conservative	Andrew Percy
Kingston upon Hull East	Kieran Persand	Karl Turner	Bob Morgan	Neil Hunter	Julia Brown				Labour	Karl Turner
Kingston upon Hull North and Cottingham	Callum Procter	Diana Johnson	Craig Woolmer	Martin Baker	Kerry Harrison	Rowan Halstead		Ahmet Cinalp (Independent); Pauline Peachey (Independent); Michael Whale (TUSC)	Labour	Diana Johnson
Kingston upon Hull West and Haltemprice	Rachel Storer	Emma Hardy	Linda Johnson	Julie Peck	Kevin Paulson		Lucy Needham		Labour	Emma Hardy

=== North and NE Lincolnshire ===
Constituency	Conservative	Labour	Liberal Democrats	Reform UK	Green Party	Others	Incumbent	
Brigg and Immingham	Martin Vickers	Najmul Hussain	Eleanor Rylance	Paul Ladlow	Amie Watson		Conservative	Martin Vickers
Great Grimsby and Cleethorpes	Lia Nici	Melanie Onn	John Lawson	Oliver Freeston	Ed Fraser	Chris Stephenson (SDP); Mark Gee (TUSC)	Conservative	Lia Nici
Scunthorpe	Holly Mumby-Croft	Nic Dakin	Cahal Burke	Darren Haley	Nick Cox	Scott Curtis (Heritage); Abdul Butt (Independent)	Conservative	Holly Mumby-Croft

=== North Yorkshire and York ===
Constituency	Conservative	Labour	Liberal Democrats	Reform UK	Green Party	Yorkshire	Others	Incumbent	
Harrogate and Knaresborough	Andrew Jones	Conrad Whitcroft	Tom Gordon	John Swales	Shan Oakes		Paul Haslam (Independent); Stephen Metcalfe (Independent)	Conservative	Andrew Jones
Richmond and Northallerton	Rishi Sunak	Tom Wilson	Daniel Callaghan	Lee Martin Taylor	Kevin Foster	Rio Goldhammer	Jason Barnett (Independent); Count Binface (Count Binface Party); Angie Campion (Independent); Lou Dickens (Workers); Niko Omilana (Independent); Brian Richmond (Independent); Sir Archibald Stanton (Monster Raving Loony)	Conservative	Rishi Sunak
Scarborough and Whitby	Roberto Weeden-Sanz	Alison Hume	Robert Lockwood	David Bowes	Annette Hudspeth	Lee Derrick	Thomas Foster (SDP); Asa Jones (Social Justice Party)	Conservative	Robert Goodwill
Selby	Charles Richardson	Keir Mather	Christian Vassie	David Burns	Angela Oldershaw			Labour	Keir Mather (Note: Elected in a by-election)
Skipton and Ripon	Julian Smith	Malcolm Birks	Andrew Murday	Simon Garvey	Andy Brown	Ryan Kett	Guy Phoenix (Heritage); Keith Tordoff (Independent)	Conservative	Julian Smith
Thirsk and Malton	Kevin Hollinrake	Lisa Banes	Steve Mason	Mark Robinson	Richard McLane	Luke Brownlee		Conservative	Kevin Hollinrake
Wetherby and Easingwold	Alec Shelbrooke	Ben Pickles	James Monaghan	Michael Jordan	Arnold Warneken	John Hall		Conservative	Alec Shelbrooke
York Central	Richard Hudson	Rachael Maskell	Alan Page	Cliff Bond	Lars Kramm		Roger James (Independent); Ruairi Kendall (Independent); Alasdair Lord (Independent); Leo Mayne (Independent)	Labour	Rachael Maskell
York Outer	Julian Sturdy	Luke Charters	Andrew Hollyer	John Crispin-Bailey	Michael Kearney	David Eadington	Darren Borrows (Independent); Keith Hayden (Independent); Hal Mayne (Independent)	Conservative	Julian Sturdy

=== South Yorkshire ===
Constituency	Conservative	Labour	Liberal Democrats	Reform UK	Green Party	Yorkshire Party	SDP	Workers	Others	Incumbent	
Barnsley North	Tamas Kovacs	Dan Jarvis	Penny Baker	Robert Lomas	Tom Heyes	Tony Devoy			Neil Fisher (Independent); Janus Polenceusz (English Democrats)	Labour	Dan Jarvis
Barnsley South	Suzanne Pearson	Stephanie Peacock	Simon Clement-Jones	David White	Trevor Meyne	Simon Biltcliffe			Maxine Spencer (Patriots Alliance – English Democrats and UKIP)	Labour	Stephanie Peacock
Doncaster Central	Nick Allen	Sally Jameson	Greg Ruback	Surjit Duhre	Jennifer Rozenfelds	Andrew Walmsley		Tosh McDonald		Labour	Rosie Winterton
Doncaster East and the Isle of Axholme	Nick Fletcher	Lee Pitcher	Nicola Turner	Irwen Martin	Paul Garrett				Michael Longfellow (Climate Party)	Conservative	Nick Fletcher
Doncaster North	Glenn Bluff	Ed Miliband	Jonathan Harston		Tony Nicholson	Christopher Dawson	David Bettney		Catherine Briggs (Party of Women); Frank Calladine (British Democrats); Andy Hiles (TUSC)	Labour	Ed Miliband
Penistone and Stocksbridge	Miriam Cates	Marie Tidball	Robert Reiss	Edward Dillingham	Andrew Davies					Conservative	Miriam Cates
Rawmarsh and Conisbrough	Oliver Harvey	John Healey	Paul Horton	Adam Wood	Tom Hill			Robert Watson		Labour	John Healey
Rother Valley	Alexander Stafford	Jake Richards	Colin Taylor	Tony Harrison	Paul Martin					Conservative	Alexander Stafford
Rotherham	not contesting	Sarah Champion	Adam Carter	John Cronly	Tony Mabbott	David Atkinson		Taukir Iqbal	Ishtiaq Ahmad (Independent)	Labour	Sarah Champion
Sheffield Central	Lucy Stephenson	Abtisam Mohamed	Sam Christmas		Angela Argenzio		Annie Stoker	Caitlin Hardy	Isabelle France (TUSC); Alison Teal (Independent)	Labour	Paul Blomfield
Sheffield South East	Caroline Kampila	Clive Betts	Sophie Thornton		Hannah Nicklin		Matthew Leese	Muzafar Rahman	Jack Carrington (Independent)	Labour	Clive Betts
Sheffield Brightside and Hillsborough	Aaron Jacob	Gill Furniss	Will Sapwell		Christine Gilligan Kubo		Jeremy Turner	Mark Tyler	Maxine Bowler (Independent)	Labour	Gill Furniss
Sheffield Hallam	Isaac Howarth	Olivia Blake	Shaffaq Mohammed		Jason Leman		Andrew Cowell	Mo Moui-Tabrizy	Sam Chapman (Rejoin EU)	Labour	Olivia Blake
Sheffield Heeley	Lorna Maginnis	Louise Haigh	Rebecca Atkinson		Alexi Dimond		Helen Jackman	Steven Roy	Louise McDonald (Party of Women); Mick Suter (TUSC)	Labour	Louise Haigh

=== West Yorkshire ===
Constituency	Conservative	Labour	Liberal Democrats	Reform UK	Green Party	Yorkshire Party	SDP	Workers	Others	Incumbent	
Bradford East	Aubrey Holt	Imran Hussain	Robert O'Carroll	Jacob Anstey	Celia Hickson	Lara Barras	Richard Riley			Labour	Imran Hussain
Bradford South	Zaf Shah	Judith Cummins	Anthony Smith	Ian Eglin	Matt Edwards	Jonathan Barras		Harry Boota	Rehiana Ali (Independent); Thérèse Hirst (English Democrats)	Labour	Judith Cummins
Bradford West	Nigel Moxon	Naz Shah	Imad Ahmed	Jamie Hinton-Wardle	Khalid Mahmood				Umar Ghafoor (Independent); Akeel Hussain (Independent); Muhammed Ali Islam (Independent)	Labour	Naz Shah
Calder Valley	Vanessa Lee	Josh Fenton-Glynn	Donal O'Hanlon	Donald Walmsley	Kieran Turner	James Vasey	James McNeill			Conservative	Craig Whittaker
Colne Valley	Jason McCartney	Paul Davies (Labour politician)	Katharine Macy	Stuart Hale	Heather Peacock	Timothy Millea				Conservative	Jason McCartney
Dewsbury and Batley	Lalit Suryawanshi	Heather Iqbal	John Rossington	Jonathan Thackray	Simon Cope				Iqbal Mohamed (Independent)	Conservative (Note: Predecessor constituency Dewsbury went Conservative in 2019, but seat is notionally Labour under new boundaries)	Mark Eastwood
Halifax	Hazel Sharp	Kate Dearden	Samuel Jackson	James Griffith-Jones	Martin Hey			Shakir Saghir	Perveen Hussain (Independent)	Labour	Holly Lynch
Normanton and Hemsworth	Alice Hopkin	Jon Trickett	Craig Dobson	Callum Daniel Bushrod	Ashton Howick					Labour	Jon Trickett
Huddersfield	Tony McGrath	Harpreet Uppal	Jan Dobrucki	Susan Laird	Andrew Cooper					Labour	Barry Sheerman
Keighley and Ilkley	Robbie Moore	John Grogan	Chris Adams	Andrew Judson	John Wood	Dominic Atlas			Vasim Shabir (Independent)	Conservative	Robbie Moore
Leeds South	Karen Cooksley	Hilary Benn	George Sykes		Ed Carlisle		Daniel Whetstone	Muhammad Azeem	Janet Bickerdike (CPA); Niko Omilana (Independent)	Labour	Hilary Benn
Leeds East	Sam Firth	Richard Burgon	Tobie Abel	David Dresser	Jennifer Norman-Kerr	David Hough	Catherine Dobson		Niko Omilana (Independent); Pete Young (Independent)	Labour	Richard Burgon
Leeds North East	Chris Whiteside	Fabian Hamilton	Gary Busuttil	Kieran White	Louise Jennings	Ian Cowling	Cordelia Lynan	Dawud Islam	Mike Davies (Alliance for Green Socialism); Stewart Hey (Climate Party); Chris Nicholson (CPA)	Labour	Fabian Hamilton
Leeds Central and Headingley	Jenny Jackson	Alex Sobel	Chris Howley	Reggie Wray	Chris Foren		Rob Walker	Owais Rajput	Louie Fulton (TUSC)	Labour	Alex Sobel
Leeds North West	Thomas Averre	Katie White	Ryk Downes	Jayne Bond	Mick Bradley	Bob Buxton	Kathy Bushell			Conservative	Stuart Andrew
Leeds West and Pudsey	Lee Farmer	Rachel Reeves	Dan Walker	Andrea Whitehead	Ann Forsaith	Darren Longhorn	Sasha Watson	Jamal El Kheir		Labour	Rachel Reeves
Leeds South West and Morley	Andrea Jenkyns	Mark Sewards	Michael Fox	James Kendall	Chris Bell	Howard Dews	Nigel Perry			Conservative	Andrea Jenkyns
Ossett and Denby Dale	Mark Eastwood	Jade Botterill	James Wilkinson	Sandra Senior	Neil Doig	David Herdson				Conservative	New seat
Pontefract, Castleford and Knottingley	Laura Weldon	Yvette Cooper	Jamie Needle	John Thomas	Olli Watkins		Trevor Lake			Labour	Yvette Cooper
Shipley	Philip Davies	Anna Dixon	Graham Reed	Simon Dandy	Kevin Warnes	Will Grant	Paul Shkurka	Waqas Ali Khan	Darryl Morton-Wright (CPA); Nagbea (Independent)	Conservative	Philip Davies
Spen Valley	Laura Evans	Kim Leadbeater	Alison Brelsford	Sarah Wood	Martin Price				Javed Bashir (Independent)	Labour	Kim Leadbeater (Note: Elected in a by-election)
Wakefield and Rothwell	Arnold Craven	Simon Lightwood	Stewart Golton	David Alan Dews	Ash Routh	Brent Hawksley	Nicholas Sanders	Keith Mason		Labour	Simon Lightwood (Note: Elected in a by-election)
