= Owen Smith 2016 Labour Party leadership campaign =

UK political campaign

Owen 2016
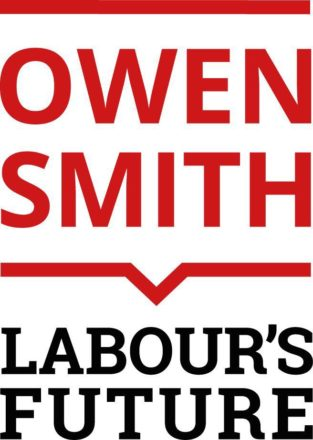
- Campaign: Labour Party leadership election, 2016
- Candidate: Owen Smith MP: Shadow Secretary of State for Work and Pensions (2015–2016)
- Status: Announced: 13 July 2016; Nominated: 20 July 2016; Defeated: 24 September 2016
- Headquarters: 83 Victoria St, Westminster, London, SW1H 0HW
- Key people: Kate Green (Campaign Chair); Heidi Alexander and Lisa Nandy (Campaign Co-Chairs); Jo Stevens (Trade Union Adviser); Neale Coleman (Chief Policy Adviser); John Lehal (Chief of Operations)
- Slogan: Labour's Future

Website
- www.owen2016.com

In 2016, Owen Smith, the Member of Parliament for Pontypridd, challenged Jeremy Corbyn for the leadership of the Labour Party, triggering an election in the United Kingdom, one year following the previous leadership ballot. His candidacy was announced in a statement on 13 July 2016, in which he declared himself to be a supporter of many of Corbyn's policies but that Corbyn did not possess the qualities necessary to win the next general election. He pledged to prevent the party from splitting and to lead Labour back into government.

Smith initially faced Angela Eagle as a fellow challenger to Jeremy Corbyn, but her withdrawal from the race on 19 July 2016, resulting from Smith's stronger level of support in the Parliamentary Labour Party, left him as the sole candidate facing the incumbent.

== Economic policy ==
Smith is anti-austerity and an opponent of the Conservative's public spending cuts since 2010. At the launch of his party leadership campaign in July 2016, he described himself as someone who is also "pro-prosperity".

=== British New Deal ===
He has proposed that £200 billion be invested to "rebuild Britain", focused on "building homes, renewing our transport links, schools and hospitals, as well as Sure Start centres, and care for older people". Smith said that doubling the number of homes built would be an important part of these plans.

=== Employment laws ===
In late July 2016, Smith said that, if elected leader of the Labour Party, he would ban zero-hour contracts and end the public sector pay freeze, saying that "The public sector pay freeze cannot continue while the costs – of housing and heating, transport and childcare – continue to rise". He said he would also reintroduce Wage Councils for hotel, shop and care workers, most of which were abolished during the 1980s and 1990s. Smith released proposals for policies aimed at improving workers rights such as a repeal of the 'Trade Unions Act' and a commitment to ensure workers' representation on remuneration committees. Smith also proposed replacing the Department for Work and Pensions with a new 'Ministry for Labour' and a revived Department for Social Security.

=== Housing ===
In an interview with The Guardian in mid July, Smith said that housing – doubling the number of homes built – would be an important part of his platform.

=== Taxation ===
Smith has suggested that income tax rates on the highest paid should be increased, with a top rate of 50%, claiming that recent party policy had been "too timid". He has also promised to reverse cuts in Corporation Tax due to take place up until 2020 whilst reversing the cuts made to Capital Gains Tax and Inheritance Tax in the Summer Budget.

== Immigration policy ==
Smith has said that Labour must be overtly pro-immigration, even if it means losing votes to UKIP. He said Labour should champion the benefits of immigration such as helping economic growth and staffing public services. Previously Smith had suggested that immigration put pressure on wages.

== Foreign policy ==
=== Brexit deal referendum ===
On 13 July 2016, and following the vote to leave the EU three weeks previously, Smith pledged that he would press for an early general election or offer a further referendum on the final 'Brexit' deal drawn up by the new Prime Minister, were he to be elected Labour leader. He also said: "I don't think we should accept we're on a definite path out. I think we need to make sure people are satisfied". According to The Guardian, Smith is in favour of a second referendum on "whatever Brexit deal May's team negotiates with the other 27 EU member states", although a BBC report described his position as "Would be 'tempted' to call a second EU referendum."

=== War Powers Act ===
Smith has proposed a new piece of legislation to be brought to Parliament, ensuring that any Prime Minister seeking support for military action must defend that action as a last resort.

== Defence policy ==
=== Trident renewal ===
When interviewed on the Today programme in July 2016, Smith revealed that he used to be a member of the Campaign for Nuclear Disarmament and "fundamentally wants the world to be without nuclear bombs." He has described himself as being a "sceptic" of the Trident nuclear programme and as favouring a multilateralist approach to nuclear disarmament (a position he noted as being Bevanite). In the weeks before the 2015 general election, he told a hustings audience that he regretted Ed Miliband's policy to renew Trident, saying: "would but we could get rid of it, but I fear that we can't." In 2016, he stated that he would vote to renew Trident, saying: "I want a world without nuclear weapons altogether, but I don't think we hasten that by divesting." Smith did vote in favour of the government's Trident renewal programme motion on 18 July 2016, as did another 139 Labour MPs, in line with long-standing party policy on at-sea nuclear deterrent.

== Party reforms ==
=== Gender balance ===
Smith pledged that he would introduce all-female shortlists in target seats at elections, as a means of achieving gender balance in the Parliamentary Labour Party.

=== Reintroduction of Clause IV ===
Smith advocated a further re-edit of 'Clause IV' which advocated the 'fight against inequality' over a return to the original Clause IV.

== Endorsements ==
List of Owen Smith endorsements

Labour Party leaders

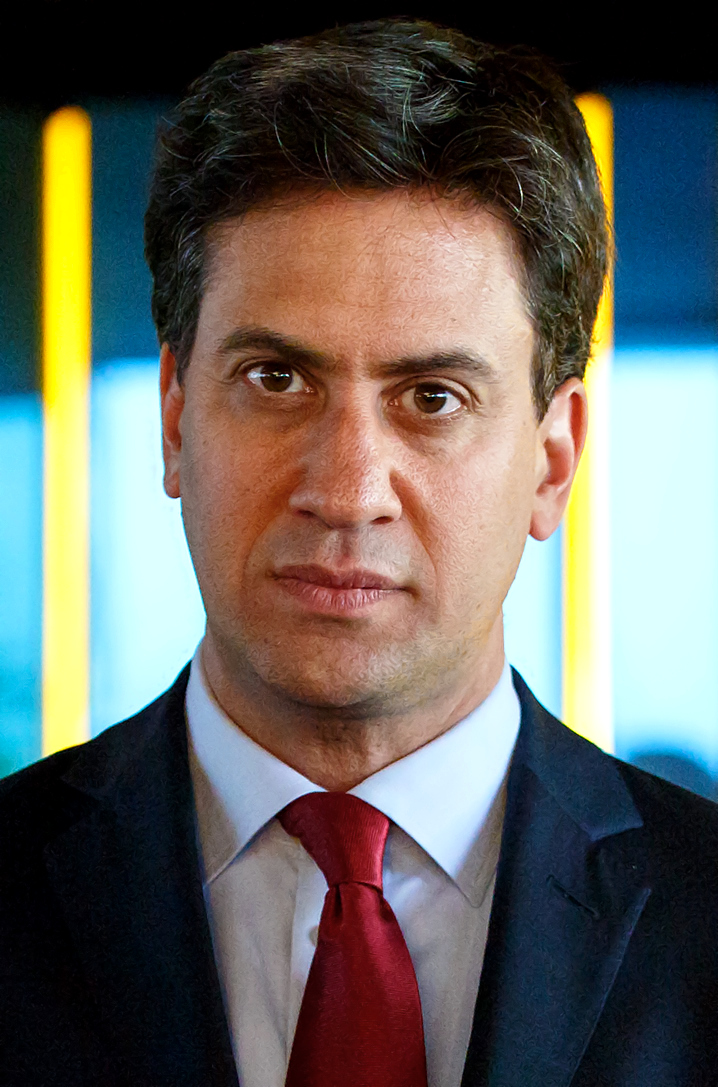
Ed Miliband

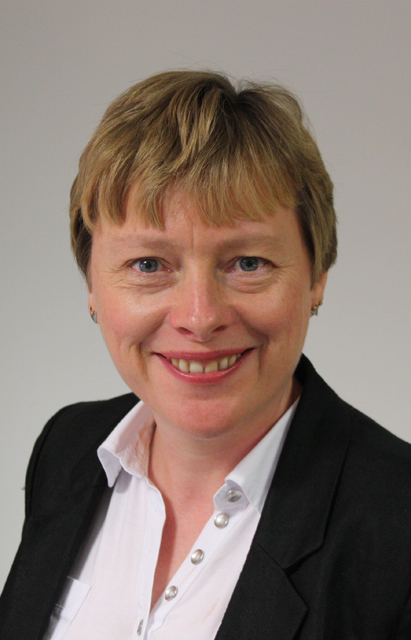
Angela Eagle

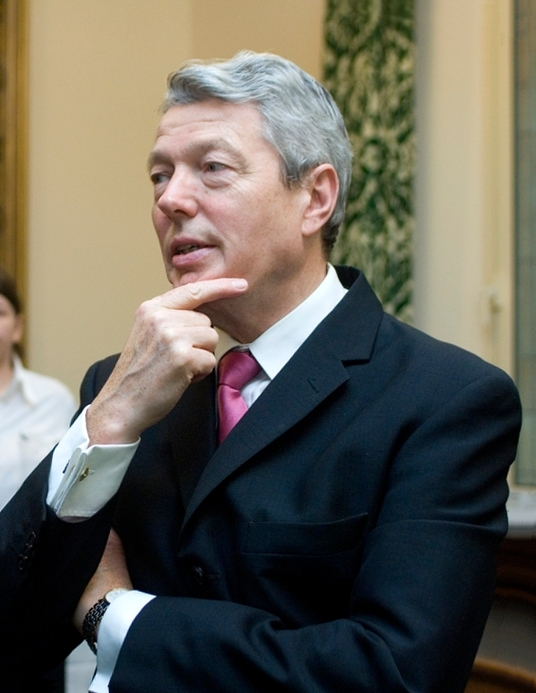
Alan Johnson

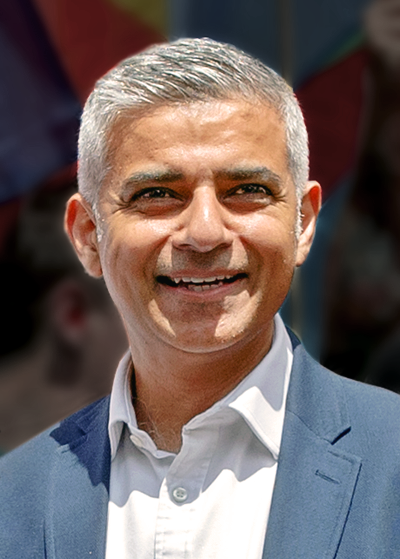
Sadiq Khan

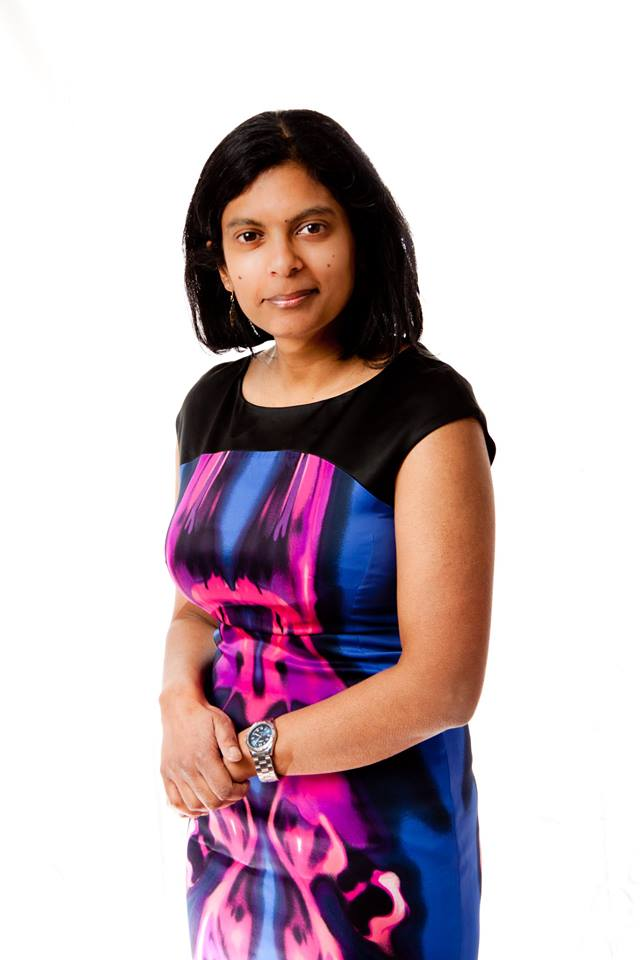
Rupa Huq

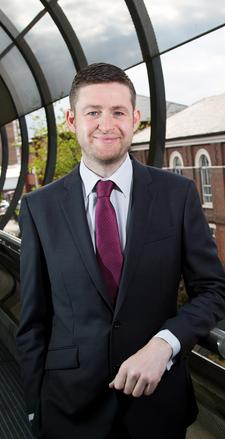
Jim McMahon

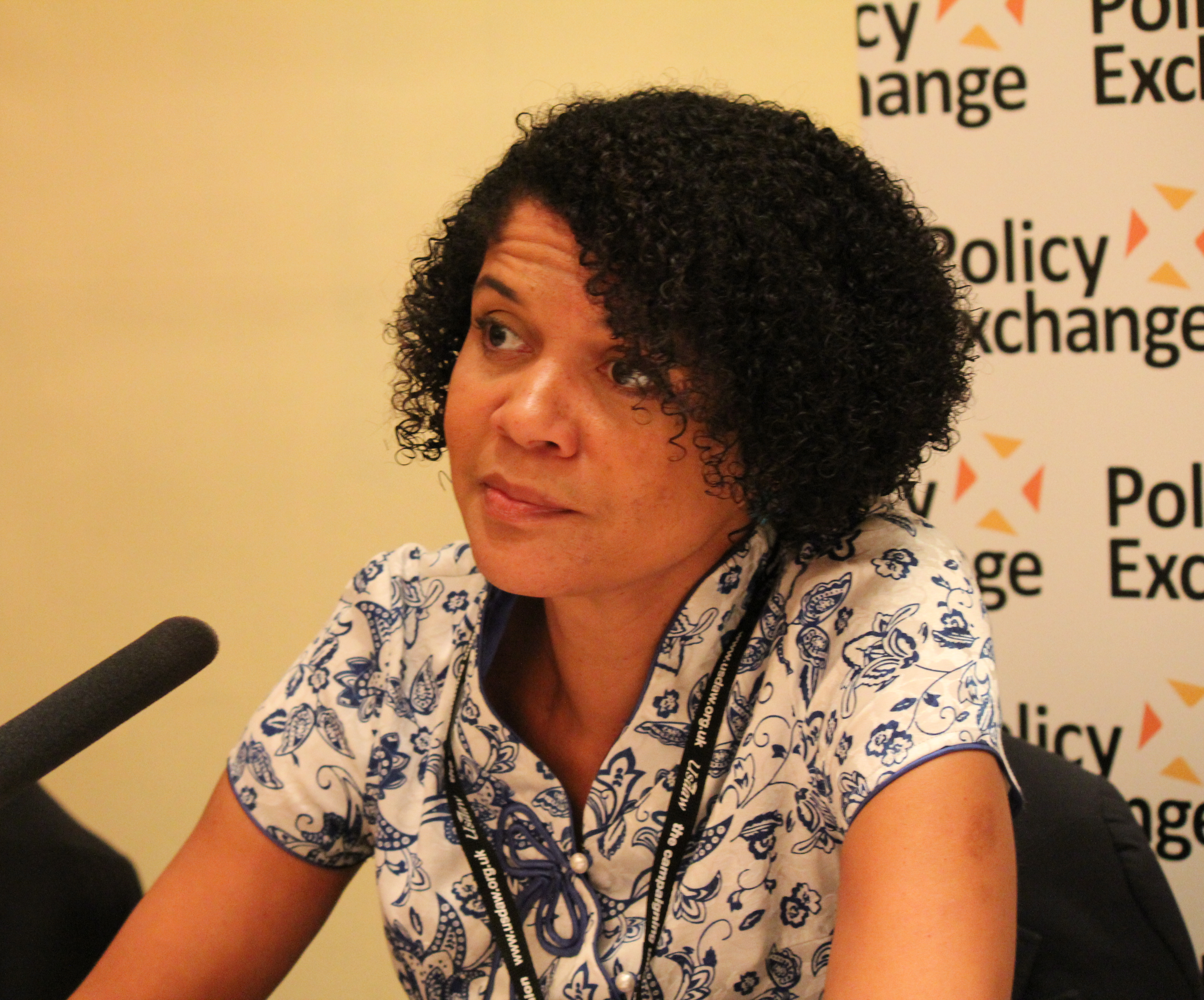
Chi Onwurah

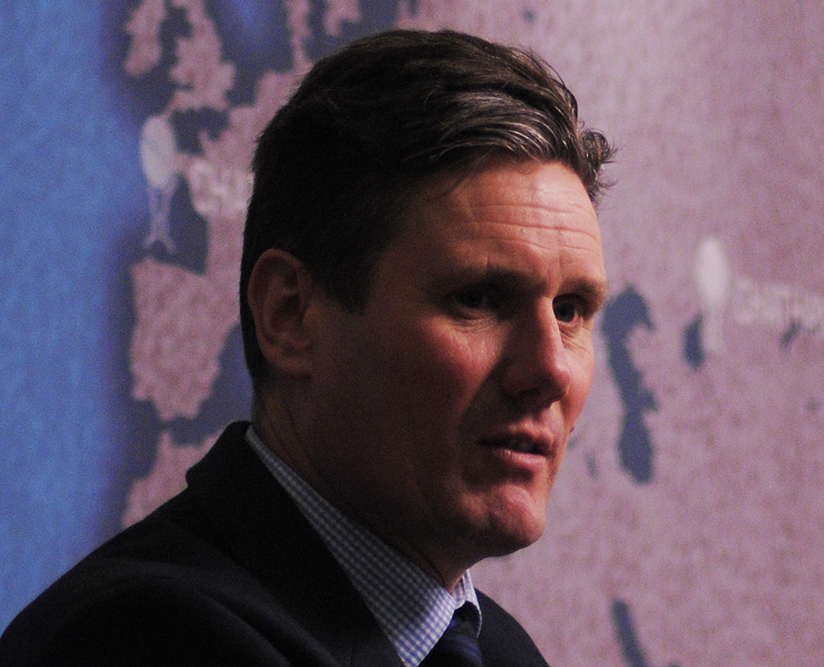
Keir Starmer

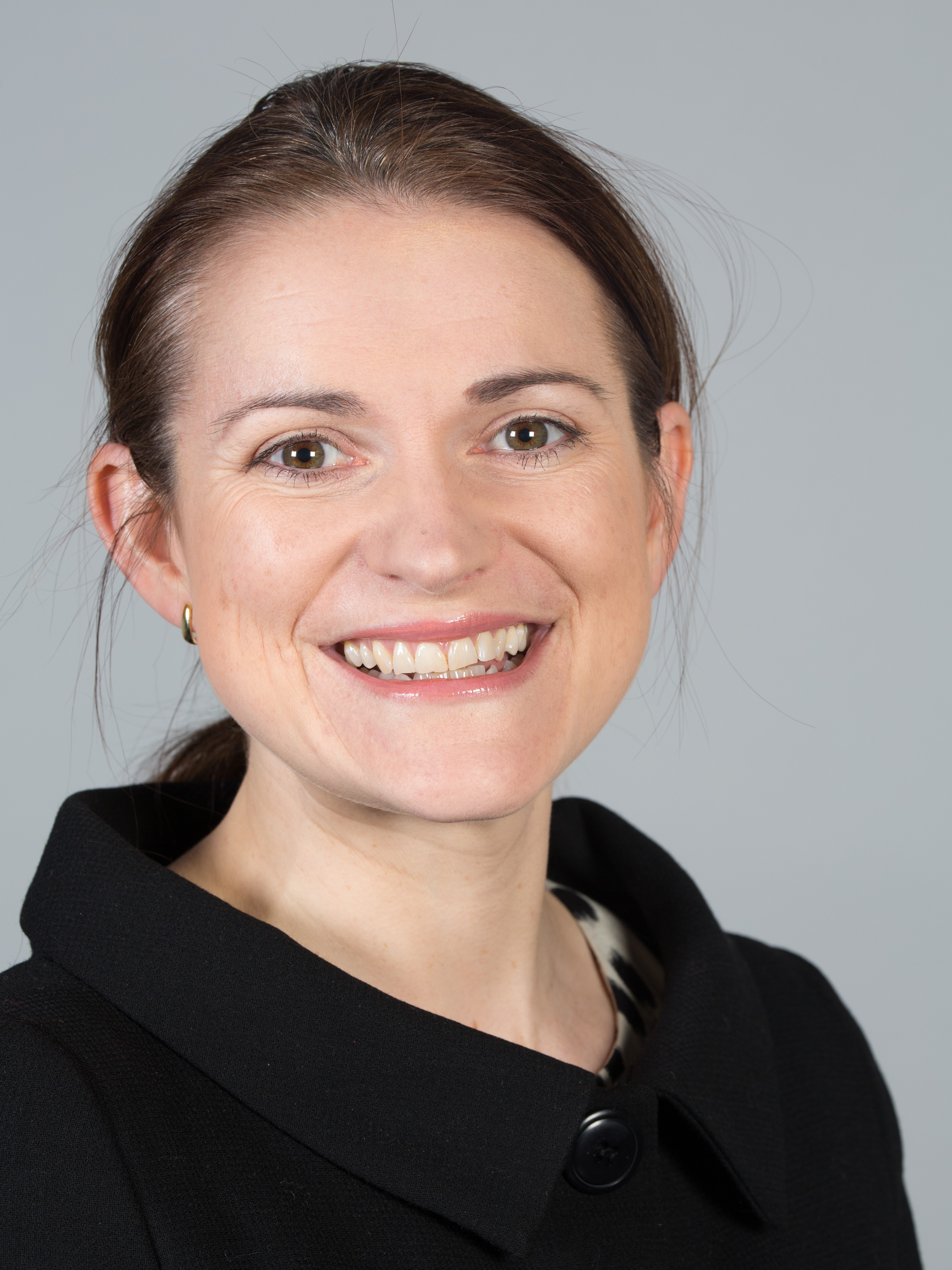
Catherine Stihler

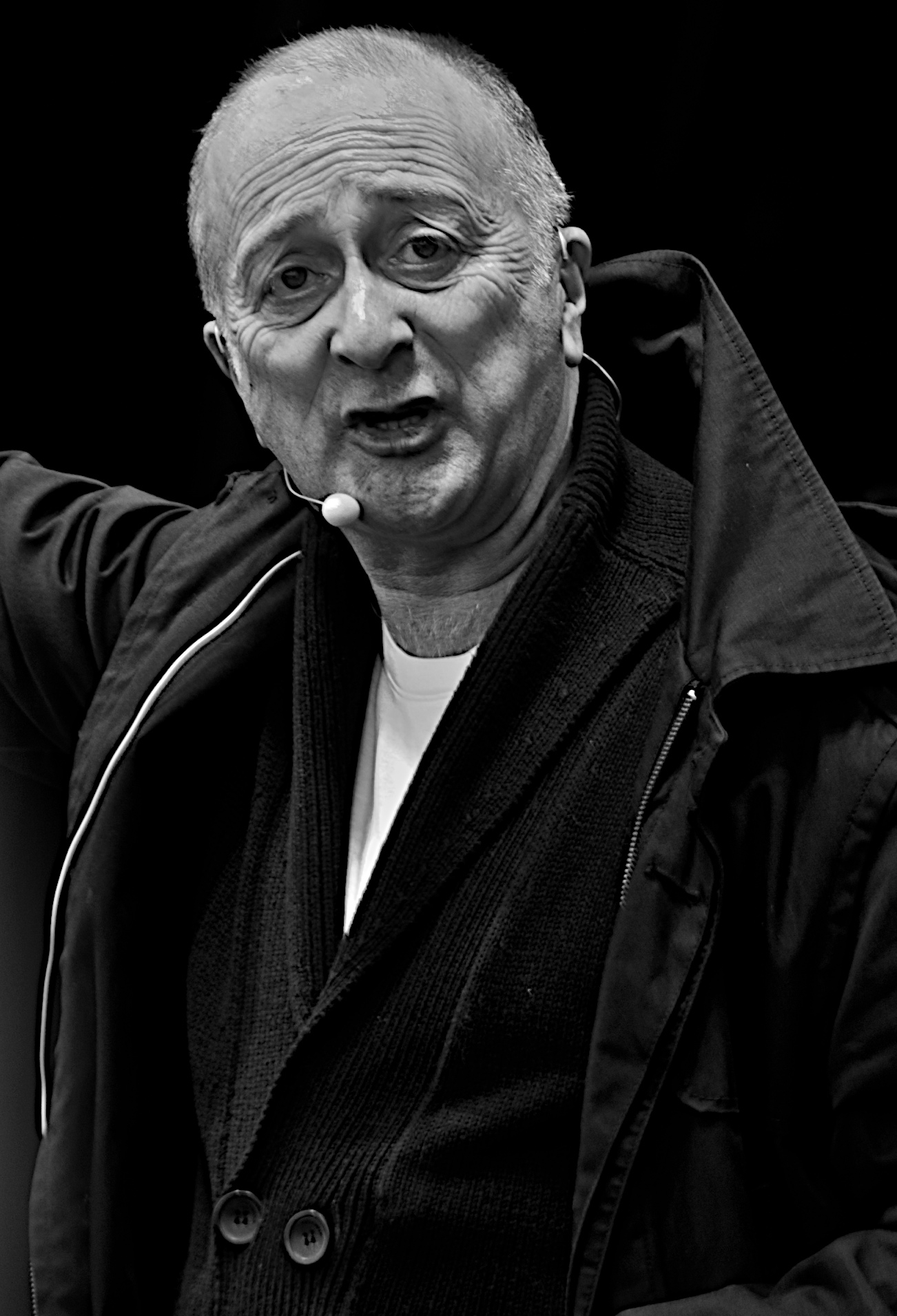
Tony Robinson

- Margaret Beckett, former Acting Leader of the Labour Party and Leader of the Opposition (1994); former Deputy Leader of the Labour Party (1992–1994); former Foreign Secretary (2006–2007); MP for Derby South
- Kezia Dugdale, Leader of the Scottish Labour Party since 2015; former Deputy Leader of the Scottish Labour Party (2014–2015); MSP for Lothian since 2011
- Harriet Harman, former Acting Leader of the Labour Party and Leader of the Opposition (2010; 2015); former Deputy Leader of the Labour Party (2007–2015); MP for Camberwell and Peckham
- Ed Miliband, former Leader of the Labour Party and Leader of the Opposition (2010–2015); MP for Doncaster North

Cabinet and Shadow Cabinet ministers

- Heidi Alexander, former Shadow Secretary of State for Health (2015–2016); MP for Lewisham East
- Hilary Benn, former Shadow Foreign Secretary (2015–2016); MP for Leeds Central
- Ben Bradshaw, former Shadow Culture Secretary (2010) and former Culture Secretary (2009–2010)
- Chris Bryant, former Shadow Leader of the House of Commons (2015–2016); MP for Rhondda
- Liam Byrne, former Shadow Secretary of State for Work and Pensions (2011–2013); former Chief Secretary to the Treasury (2009–2010); MP for Birmingham Hodge Hill
- Vernon Coaker, former Shadow Northern Ireland Secretary (2011–2013, 2015–2016), Shadow Defence Secretary (2013–2015); MP for Gedling
- Yvette Cooper, former Shadow Home Secretary (2011–2015); former Secretary of State for Work and Pensions (2009–2010); candidate for Leader in 2015 (defeated); MP for Normanton, Pontefract and Castleford
- Mary Creagh, former Shadow International Development Secretary (2014–2015); candidate for Leader in 2015 (withdrew); MP for Wakefield
- Gloria De Piero, former Shadow Minister for Young People and Voter Registration (2015–2016); MP for Ashfield
- Michael Dugher, former Shadow Culture Secretary (2015–2016); MP for Barnsley East
- Angela Eagle, former Shadow First Secretary of State and Shadow Secretary of State for Business, Innovation and Skills (2015–2016); candidate for Leader in 2016 (withdrew); MP for Wallasey
- Maria Eagle, former Shadow Culture Secretary (2016) and former Shadow Defence Secretary (2015–2016); MP for Garston and Halewood
- Caroline Flint, former Shadow Energy Secretary (2011–2015); MP for Don Valley
- Pat Glass, former Shadow Secretary of State for Education (2016); MP for North West Durham
- Kate Green, former Shadow Minister for Women and Equalities (2015–2016); MP for Stretford and Urmston
- Lilian Greenwood, former Shadow Transport Secretary (2015–2016); MP for Nottingham South
- Nia Griffith, former Shadow Welsh Secretary (2015–2016); MP for Llanelli
- Peter Hain, Baron Hain, former Shadow Welsh Secretary (2010–2012) and Welsh Secretary (2002–2008; 2009–2010); former MP for Neath
- John Healey, former Shadow Minister for Housing and Planning (2010; 2015–2016); former Shadow Secretary of State for Health (2010–2011); former Minister of State for Housing and Planning (2009–2010); MP for Wentworth and Dearne
- Tristram Hunt, former Shadow Secretary of State for Education (2013–2015); MP for Stoke-on-Trent Central
- Alan Johnson, former Shadow Chancellor (2010–2011) and former Home Secretary (2009–2010); MP for Kingston upon Hull West and Hessle
- Chris Leslie, former Shadow Chancellor (2015); MP for Nottingham East
- Shabana Mahmood, former Shadow Chief Secretary to the Treasury (2015); MP for Birmingham Ladywood
- Seema Malhotra, former Shadow Chief Secretary to the Treasury (2015–2016); MP for Feltham and Heston
- Kerry McCarthy, former Shadow Secretary of State for Environment, Food and Rural Affairs (2015–2016); MP for Bristol East
- Catherine McKinnell, former Shadow Attorney General (2015–2016); MP for Newcastle upon Tyne North
- Ian Murray, former Shadow Secretary of State for Scotland (2015–2016); MP for Edinburgh South
- Lisa Nandy, former Shadow Energy and Climate Change Secretary (2015–2016); MP for Wigan
- Lucy Powell, former Shadow Secretary of State for Education (2015–2016); MP for Manchester Central
- Rachel Reeves, former Shadow Secretary of State for Work and Pensions (2013–2015); MP for Leeds West
- Emma Reynolds, former Shadow Communities Secretary (2015); MP for Wolverhampton North East
- Andrew Smith, former Secretary of State for Work and Pensions (2002–2004); former Chief Secretary to the Treasury (1999–2002); MP for Oxford East
- Stephen Timms, former Shadow Secretary of State for Work and Pensions (2015); former Chief Secretary to the Treasury (2006–2007); MP for East Ham
- Karl Turner, former Shadow Attorney General (2016); MP for Kingston upon Hull East
- Stephen Twigg, former Shadow Secretary of State for Education (2011–2013); Chair of the International Development Select Committee since 2015; MP for Liverpool West Derby
- Chuka Umunna, former Shadow Business Secretary (2011–2015); candidate for Leader in 2015 (withdrew); MP for Streatham
- Stewart Wood, Baron Wood of Anfield, former co-Shadow Minister without Portfolio (2011–2015)

Ministers in devolved governments

- Leighton Andrews, former Minister for Education and Skills (2009–2013); former Member of the Welsh Assembly for Rhondda

Mayors and other municipal leaders

- Sadiq Khan, Mayor of London since 2016

Members of Parliament

- Rosena Allin-Khan, MP for Tooting
- Clive Betts, Chair of the Communities and Local Government Committee; MP for Sheffield South East
- Roberta Blackman-Woods, MP for City of Durham
- Tom Blenkinsop, MP for Middlesbrough South and East Cleveland
- Paul Blomfield, MP for Sheffield Central
- Lyn Brown, MP for West Ham
- Karen Buck, MP for Westminster North
- Richard Burden, MP for Birmingham Northfield
- Ruth Cadbury, MP for Brentford and Isleworth
- Jenny Chapman, MP for Darlington
- Jon Cruddas, MP for Dagenham and Rainham
- Judith Cummins, MP for Bradford South
- Alex Cunningham, MP for Stockton North
- Jim Cunningham, MP for Coventry South
- Wayne David, MP for Caerphilly
- Clive Efford, former Shadow Minister for Culture, Media and Sport (2011–2016); MP for Eltham
- Louise Ellman, Chair of the Transport Select Committee since 2008; MP for Liverpool Riverside
- Chris Elmore, MP for Ogmore
- Bill Esterson, MP for Sefton Central
- Yvonne Fovargue, MP for Makerfield
- Vicky Foxcroft, MP for Lewisham Deptford
- Mike Gapes, MP for Ilford South
- Roger Godsiff, MP for Birmingham Hall Green
- Helen Goodman, MP for Bishop Auckland
- Andrew Gwynne, Shadow Health Minister since 2011; MP for Denton and Reddish
- Louise Haigh, Shadow Minister for Digital Industries; MP for Sheffield Heeley
- David Hanson, former Minister for Security (2009–2010); MP for Delyn
- Carolyn Harris, MP for Swansea East
- Helen Hayes, MP for Dulwich and West Norwood
- Sue Hayman, MP for Workington
- Kate Hollern, MP for Blackburn
- Rupa Huq, MP for Ealing Central and Acton
- Gerald Jones, MP for Merthyr Tydfil and Rhymney
- Graham Jones, MP for Hyndburn
- Helen Jones, MP for Warrington North
- Susan Jones, MP for Clwyd South
- Barbara Keeley, former Deputy Leader of the House of Commons (2009–2010); MP for Worsley and Eccles South
- Emma Lewell-Buck, MP for South Shields
- Ian Lucas, Shadow Parliamentary Under Secretary of State for Business and Regulatory Reform since 2010; MP for Wrexham
- Holly Lynch, Opposition Whip since 2015; MP for Halifax
- Justin Madders, MP for Ellesmere Port and Neston
- Khalid Mahmood, MP for Birmingham Perry Barr
- Rob Marris, MP for Wolverhampton South West
- Chris Matheson, MP for City of Chester
- Conor McGinn, MP for St Helens North
- Liz McInnes, MP for Heywood and Middleton
- Jim McMahon, former Leader of the Oldham Metropolitan Borough Council (2011–2016); MP for Oldham West and Royton
- Jessica Morden, MP for Newport East
- Melanie Onn, MP for Great Grimsby
- Chi Onwurah, MP for Newcastle upon Tyne Central
- Albert Owen, MP for Ynys Môn
- Teresa Pearce, MP for Erith and Thamesmead
- Toby Perkins, former Shadow Minister of State for the Armed Forces (2015–2016); MP for Chesterfield
- Matthew Pennycook, MP for Greenwich and Woolwich
- Steve Reed, MP for Croydon North
- Christina Rees, MP for Neath
- Jonathan Reynolds, former Shadow Minister for Transport (2015–2016); MP for Stalybridge and Hyde
- Marie Rimmer, MP for St Helens South and Whiston
- Paula Sherriff, MP for Dewsbury
- Andy Slaughter, former Shadow Justice Minister (2010–2016); MP for Hammersmith
- Jeff Smith, MP for Manchester Withington
- Nick Smith, MP for Blaenau Gwent
- Keir Starmer, former Director of Public Prosecutions (England and Wales) (2008–2013); MP for Holborn and St Pancras
- Jo Stevens, Shadow Solicitor General since 2015; MP for Cardiff Central
- Gareth Thomas, candidate for Mayor of London in 2015; former Shadow Minister for Foreign Affairs (2013–2015); Chair of the Co-operative Party since 2001; MP for Harrow West
- Nick Thomas-Symonds, MP for Torfaen
- Anna Turley, MP for Redcar
- Alan Whitehead, MP for Southampton Test
- Iain Wright, Chair of the Business, Innovation and Skills Select Committee since 2015; MP for Hartlepool
- Daniel Zeichner, Shadow Minister for Transport; MP for Cambridge

Members of European Parliament

- Paul Brannen, MEP for North East England
- Richard Corbett, MEP for Yorkshire and the Humber
- Seb Dance, MEP for London
- Theresa Griffin, MEP for North West England
- Richard Howitt, MEP for the East of England
- David Martin, MEP for Scotland
- Linda McAvan, MEP for Yorkshire and the Humber
- Catherine Stihler, MEP for Scotland
- Derek Vaughan, MEP for Wales
- Glenis Willmott, Leader of the European Parliamentary Labour Party since 2009; MEP for the East Midlands

Academics

- David Blanchflower, labour economist, former member of McDonnell's Economic Advisory Committee (resigned in June 2016)
- Richard Murphy, British chartered accountant and political economist
- Simon Wren-Lewis, economist, former member of the Economic Advisory Committee

Artists and writers

- Alastair Campbell, journalist, broadcaster, and former Director of Communications and Strategy to Prime Minister Tony Blair
- J. K. Rowling, novelist, author of the Harry Potter fantasy series

Celebrities

- Jason Isaacs, actor
- Ross Kemp, actor and investigative journalist
- Tony Robinson, actor, comedian and TV presenter
- Robert Webb, comedian, actor and writer

Left wing activists and trade unionists

- Paul Kenny, former General Secretary of GMB
- Abby Tomlinson, founder and leader of the Milifandom

Newspapers and magazines

Constituency Labour Parties

- Aberdeenshire West
- Altrincham and Sale West
- Ayr
- Barnsley East
- Basingstoke
- Batley and Spen
- Battersea
- Blaenau Gwent
- Bermondsey and Old Southwark
- Bethnal Green and Bow
- Charnwood
- Chipping Barnet
- Clydesdale
- Darlington
- Dartford
- Derby South
- Dumfriesshire (nominates jointly with Galloway and West Dumfries)
- Ealing Central and Acton
- East Lothian
- Finchley and Golders Green
- Galloway and West Dumfries (nominates jointly with Dumfriesshire)
- Glasgow Cathcart
- Great Grimsby
- Greenock and Inverclyde
- Heywood and Middleton
- Hornsey and Wood Green
- Inverness and Nairn
- Leicester East
- Middlesbrough South and East Cleveland
- Mitcham and Morden
- Moray
- Morley and Outwood
- Na h-Eileanan an Iar
- Newcastle upon Tyne North
- North East Fife
- Nottingham South
- Pontypridd
- Reading East
- Renfrewshire South
- Richmond Park
- Runnymede and Weybridge
- Rutherglen
- South Swindon
- Stevenage
- Strathkelvin and Bearsden
- Streatham
- Twickenham
- Uddingston and Bellshill
- Vauxhall
- Warrington South
- West Ham
- Westminster North
- Wimbledon
- Wrexham

Trade unions

- General, Municipal, Boilermakers and Allied Trade Union (GMB)
- Community
- Musicians' Union
- Union of Shop, Distributive and Allied Workers (USDAW)

Socialist societies

- Jewish Labour Movement
- Labour Movement for Europe
- Socialist Health Association
