= 1Hop =

English golden ale beer

- Type: Golden ale
- Manufacturer: Slater's Ales
- Origin: England
- Introduced: 2002
- Alcohol by volume: 4%
- Colour: Blond

1Hop (formerly, Top Totty) is an English golden ale beer with a 4% alcohol content. It is brewed by Slater's Ales in Staffordshire, England. It was initially brewed as a summer ale. It gained nationwide attention after being banned from the House of Commons.

== History ==
1Hop was first brewed as Top Totty and sold in Staffordshire in 1997. In 2006, Top Totty won the Society of Independent Brewers Midlands Gold award for best specialty beer and Bronze for the overall SIBA Midlands Beer Competition. It has been described by its makers as "a stunning blonde beer, full-bodied with a voluptuous hop aroma".

== Banned in the House of Commons ==
In 2007, David Kidney the Labour Member of Parliament for Stafford arranged for Top Totty to be sold as a guest ale in the Strangers' Bar in the House of Commons. While it was on sale there, it sold out within three days. In 2012, Top Totty was again placed on sale in the Stranger's Bar. Two days later, the Labour Party's Shadow Minister for Women and Equalities, Kate Green became aware that the beer was for sale in the House and requested that it be removed from the Stranger's Bar due to the use of a pump clip depicting a bunny girl in a bikini, which she found disturbing.

The beer was removed from the Stranger's Bar and the Leader of the House of Commons, Sir George Young stated that "action would be taken", which led to Top Totty being banned from the House of Commons. A petition was submitted to the British government in February 2012 calling for the beer to be reinstated but was rejected as not covering an area for which the government or parliament was responsible.

United Kingdom Independence Party Member of the European Parliament, Mike Natrass opposed the ban, saying that "knee-jerk puritanism does more to damage the cause of equality than a thousand beer labels." Top Totty was replaced in the Stranger's Bar by another beer called Kangaroo Court. Slater's Ales did offer to change the pump clip used when the beer was offered for sale in Parliament but did not intend to change it when offered for sale elsewhere in the United Kingdom.

== Reaction ==
The ban in parliament caused widespread publicity and an increase in sales. Slater's Ales started to sell the beer all year round instead of just in the summer, and orders were received from abroad. A public relations company connected with Slater's claimed that the press coverage was good publicity for the beer. Fay Slater of the brewers, commented "It's been positive to us, it's in our favour and expectedly so".

In late 2018, Slater's Ales changed the name of the beer from 'Top Totty' to '1Hop', as the beer is brewed with only one type of hop 'English WGV'. This change was partially due to focus groups, and from various feedback received to the brewery. This move also removed the 'bunny girl' from the original logo and pump clip of the beer.
