= Kate Green =

British Labour politician

Kate Green OBE JP
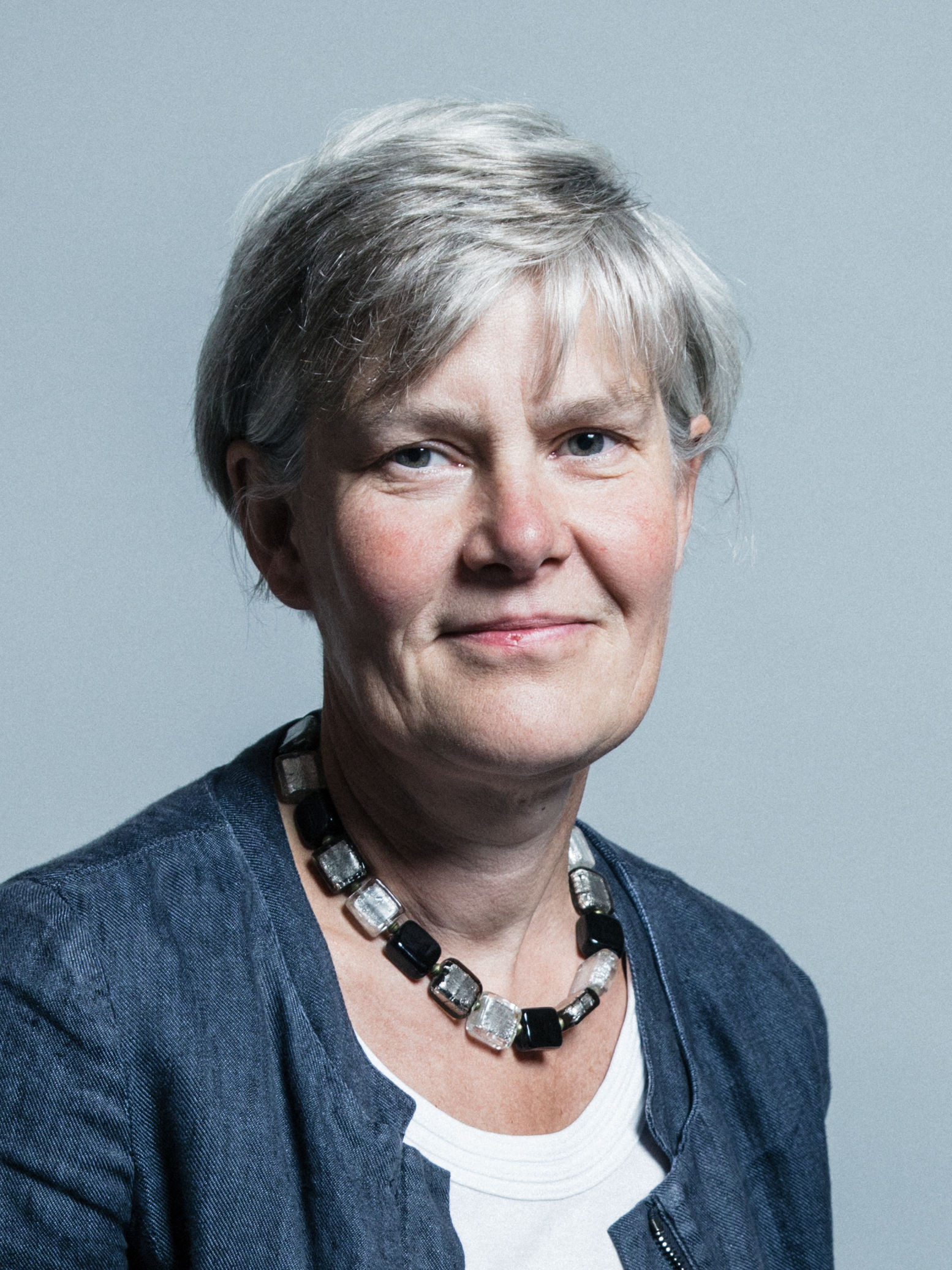
- Official portrait, 2017

Deputy Mayor of Greater Manchester for Policing and Crime
- Incumbent
- Assumed office 9 January 2023
- Mayor: Andy Burnham; Paul Dennett (acting); Bev Craig
- Preceded by: Beverley Hughes

Member of Parliament for Stretford and Urmston
- In office 6 May 2010 – 10 November 2022
- Preceded by: Beverley Hughes
- Succeeded by: Andrew Western

Chair of the Committees on Privileges and Standards
- In office October 2018 – May 2020
- Preceded by: Kevin Barron
- Succeeded by: Chris Bryant
Shadow portfolios
2020–2021	Education
2013–2015, 2020	Disabled People
2011–2013, 2015–2016	Women and Equalities

Personal details
- Born: Katherine Anne Green; 2 May 1960 (age 66) Edinburgh, Scotland
- Party: Labour
- Education: University of Edinburgh (LLB)

Katherine Anne Green (born 2 May 1960) is a British politician serving as Deputy Mayor of Greater Manchester for Policing and Crime since 2023. She previously served as Member of Parliament (MP) for Stretford and Urmston between 2010 and 2022. A member of the Labour Party, she served as Shadow Minister for Women and Equalities from 2015 to 2016, Chair of the Committees on Privileges and Standards from 2018 to 2020, and Shadow Secretary of State for Education from 2020 to 2021.

Under Ed Miliband's leadership, she was a junior Shadow Equalities Minister from 2011 to 2013 and Shadow Disabled People Minister from 2013 to 2015. Green was promoted to the shadow cabinet after Jeremy Corbyn became Labour leader in 2015, as Shadow Women and Equalities Minister. After losing confidence in Corbyn's leadership, she resigned in 2016 and chaired Owen Smith's unsuccessful leadership challenge.

Green was elected to chair the Privileges and Standards Committees in 2018, and stood down upon her appointment as Shadow Child Poverty Strategy Minister by new Labour leader Keir Starmer in April 2020. Starmer promoted her to Shadow Education Secretary in June 2020, but she left the front bench in the November 2021 shadow cabinet reshuffle. She resigned her seat in parliament in November 2022 after being nominated by Andy Burnham as Greater Manchester's Deputy Mayor for Policing and Crime.

== Early life ==
Katherine Anne Green was born on 2 May 1960 in Edinburgh, Scotland. Her parents were Jessie Craig (née Bruce) and Maurice Green, who was Jewish. She attended Currie High School and the University of Edinburgh, graduating with a Bachelor of Laws degree.

== Career ==
After university, Green began a career at Barclays Bank, working for the organisation from 1982 to 1997. From 1997 to 1999 she worked as a Whitehall and Industry Group secondee to the Home Office. Green was a magistrate in the City of London between 1993 and 2009.

Green was employed as director of the National Council for One Parent Families from 2000 to 2004 and chief executive of the Child Poverty Action Group (CPAG) from 2004 to 2009. Her role at the CPAG was notably held by Frank Field in the 1960s and 70s, who she would later serve alongside in Parliament. Green was a member, and later chair, of the London Child Poverty Commission between 2006 and 2009.

Green joined the Labour Party in 1990 and stood unsuccessfully in the 1997 General Election as the candidate for the Greater London constituency of Cities of London and Westminster. She contested the 2000 London Assembly election in the West Central constituency, again not being elected.

== Parliamentary career ==
In 2009, Green was selected as the candidate for Stretford and Urmston through an all-women shortlist following Beverley Hughes's announcement that she would not be seeking re-election. She was elected as Member of Parliament on 6 May 2010, securing 48.6% of the vote and increasing the majority Hughes gained in the 2005 general election.

Since entering Parliament, Green has been elected as a Vice-Chair of the Labour Party's National Policy Forum and served as the chairman of the Women's Parliamentary Labour Party.

In November 2011, Green was criticised for failing to declare an interest when tabling an amendment to a bill. Green had neglected to mention her membership of the GMB trade union when attempting to amend the Legal Aid Bill. In a statement in Parliament Green apologised, saying: "I was advised on those amendments by the GMB trade union. My entry in the Register of Members’ Financial Interests makes clear my membership of and relationship with that union, but I regret that I did not draw attention to that last week in the Chamber because the amendments did not relate specifically to the union, but to the rights of individual employees." The Speaker of the House of Commons, John Bercow, accepted Green's apology, describing it as "most courteous" and insisting that the matter had been resolved.

In February 2012, Green complained about a beer sold in the House of Commons Stranger's Bar, called Top Totty. The advertising plate on the pump handle featured an image of a bikini-clad bunny girl, which Green said "demeaned women". Leader of the House Sir George Young upheld her complaint and had the beer removed. The beer, brewed in Stafford by Slater's, had been recommended to the House in 2007 by Labour MP for Stafford David Kidney after a visit to Slater's Brewery.

Green was re-elected in the 2015 general election on an increased voter turnout, managing to increase both the Labour Party's share and majority.

Green became chair of Owen Smith's leadership campaign challenging Jeremy Corbyn in the 2016 leadership election. Green wrote in the New Statesman in September 2016: "Even when Jeremy gets that there's a problem, his solutions too often reinforce rather than address the root causes of gender inequality".

Green held her seat at the 2017 and 2019 general elections. She announced in February 2022 that she would be standing down at the 2024 general election. On 9 November 2022, she was announced as Mayor of Greater Manchester Andy Burnham's nominee to succeed Baroness Bev Hughes as Deputy Mayor for Policing; in order to take up the post, she applied to become Crown Steward and Bailiff of the Manor of Northstead on 10 November, a procedural device which allows MPs to resign.

=== Frontbench Opposition career ===
Following a reshuffle of Labour's shadow ministerial team in October 2011, Green was promoted to junior Shadow Minister for Equalities. In October 2013, Green became Shadow Minister for Disabled People.

Following Jeremy Corbyn's election as Leader of the Labour Party, Green was promoted to the shadow cabinet as Shadow Minister for Women and Equalities. In a March 2016 speech, Corbyn advocated the decriminalisation of the sex industry, to which Green commented "without any discussion or consultation with his shadow cabinet, with me as his shadow minister for women and equalities, with women in the PLP or, to the best of my knowledge, with anyone in the wider Labour Party". She resigned from this position on 27 June 2016.

Green was a supporter of the Remain campaign during the EU referendum

In April 2020, Keir Starmer was elected as Labour Leader and appointed Green to return to the opposition front bench. She held the portfolio of Shadow Minister for Child Poverty Strategy, which shadowed the Department for Work and Pensions. In June 2020, she was appointed as Shadow Education Secretary, succeeding Rebecca Long-Bailey. Green was replaced as Shadow Education Secretary in the November 2021 reshuffle and departed the front bench. The Guardian attributed her shadow cabinet dismissal to Starmer's promotion of media performers.

=== Parliamentary Committees ===
Green has been a member of the Work and Pensions Select Committee, European Scrutiny Committee, Justice Select Committee, Committee of Privileges, Commons Select Committee on Standards (which she chaired from October 2018 to November 2019 and January 2020 to May 2020), the Home Affairs Select Committee, and the Liaison Committee. She contested the chairmanship of the Work and Pensions Committee in June 2015, but was defeated by Labour colleague Frank Field by 307 votes to 248.

=== All-party Parliamentary Groups ===
Green was an officer of the following All-Party Parliamentary Groups (APPGs), as of May 2020:

- Migration (chair)
- Gypsies, Roma, and Travellers (chair)
- Women in the Penal System (chair)
- Learning Disability (vice-chair)
- Legal Aid (vice-chair)
- Srebrenica (vice-chair)
- Valproate and other Anti-Epileptic Drugs in Pregnancy (vice-chair)
- Dalits (treasurer)

== Personal life and honours ==
Green married Richard Duncan Mabb in 1985; the couple divorced in 2006.

She is a member of the GMB and Unite trade unions, the Fawcett Society, the Fabian Society (where she is a vice president and which she chaired from 2016 to 2018), and CPAG.

She is a past trustee of the Friends Provident Foundation, Institute for Fiscal Studies, Family and Parenting Institute, Avenues Youth Project, and End Child Poverty.

Green was made an Officer of the Order of the British Empire for "services to welfare work" as part of the 2005 New Year Honours, where her work in the CPAG and membership of the National Employment Panel was recognised.

== Selected bibliography ==
- Green, Kate; Bergmann, Barbara; Himmelweit, Susan F.; Albelda, Randy P.; Women's Committee of One Hundred; Koren, Charlotte (July 2004). "Lone mothers: What is to be done?". Feminist Economics. 10 (2): 237–264. doi:10.1080/1354570042000217793. S2CID 154744396.

== See also ==
Everywoman Safe Everywhere – Labour's Consultation on Women's Safety

Parliament of the United Kingdom
Preceded by Beverley Hughes	Member of Parliament for Stretford and Urmston; 2010–2022	Succeeded by Andrew Western
Political offices
Preceded by Gloria De Piero	Shadow Minister for Women and Equalities; 2015–2016	Succeeded by Angela Rayner
Preceded by Beverly Hughes	Deputy Mayor of Greater Manchester for Policing and Crime; 2023–	Incumbent
Party political offices
Preceded by Seema Malhotra	Chair of the Fabian Society; 2016–2018	Succeeded by Ivana Bartoletti
