= Val Shawcross =

British Labour Co-op politician

Valerie Shawcross CBE
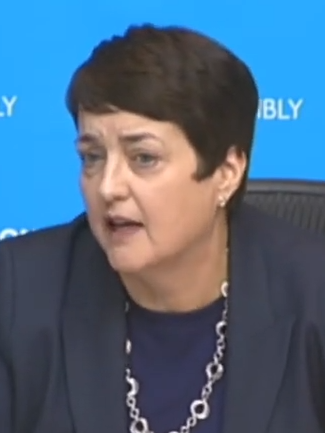
- Shawcross in 2018

Deputy Mayor of London for Transport
- In office 9 May 2016 – 21 May 2018
- Mayor: Sadiq Khan
- Preceded by: Isabel Dedring
- Succeeded by: Heidi Alexander

Member of the London Assembly for Lambeth and Southwark
- In office 4 May 2000 – 5 May 2016
- Preceded by: Constituency established
- Succeeded by: Florence Eshalomi

Personal details
- Born: Middleton, Lancashire, UK
- Party: Labour Co-op
- Spouse: Michael Anteney
- Education: University of Liverpool (BA); London Institute (MA)

Valerie Shawcross CBE is a British politician who served as Deputy Mayor of London for Transport from 2016 to 2018. A member of the Labour Co-operative parties, she was Member of the London Assembly for Lambeth and Southwark from 2000 to 2016.

Shawcross was a Member of Croydon London Borough Council from 1994 to 2000, and served as Leader of the Council from 1997 to 2000. She unsuccessfully stood, as the Labour candidate, to become Mayor of Croydon in 2022.

== Early life and education ==
Born on Langley Council Estate, Middleton, Shawcross attended local state schools before gaining a 2:1 degree in Political Theory and Institutions from the University of Liverpool. She joined the Labour Party aged 19.

Elected as the Deputy President of the Guild of Undergraduates in 1980, she moved to London in 1981 to take up a post at the UK Council for Students Affairs - UKCOSA (Charity). She gained an MA in Human Rights and Education at the London Institute in 1986.

== Political career ==
=== Croydon Council ===
She served as a councillor for New Addington in Croydon from 1994 to 2000, serving as chair of education and later as leader of Croydon London Borough Council from 1997 to 2000.

=== London Assembly and Deputy Mayoralty ===
She was first elected to the London Assembly in 2000, and retained her seat in subsequent elections. In 2000, the mayor of London Ken Livingstone appointed her as the chair of the London Fire and Emergency Planning Authority (LFEPA). She accepted the appointment on the condition that she would "consider herself bound by Labour's policies and not the mayor's", with Livingstone at the time being an independent politician. In his memoir, Livingstone wrote that she "spent the next eight years transforming the London Fire Brigade, leading to a dramatic reduction in loss of life from fires, cutting waste and, later, organising emergency response procedures after 9/11". At the same time, she served as the Labour group's spokesperson for transport and as chair of the London Assembly Transport Committee. She also served on the Assembly Budget Scrutiny Committee, and chaired the audit committee immediately following her election.

On 7 December 2010, it was announced that Shawcross would be Livingstone's running-mate in the 2012 London mayoral election, Ken Livingstone. Shawcross unsuccessfully sought selection as the Labour candidate for the 2012 Croydon North by-election, with Steve Reed becoming the candidate and winning the seat. In 2015, she announced that she would not seek re-election to the London Assembly at the 2016 elections.

In May 2016, Sadiq Khan appointed her as deputy mayor of London for transport and deputy chair of Transport for London. In May 2018, she announced her retirement.

=== Retirement and Croydon Mayoralty ===
Following her retirement from full-time public life in 2018, she worked as chair of the Heathrow Area Transport Forum, and assumed roles in the Thames Festival Trust and Crystal Palace Park Trust.

In October 2021, Shawcross announced her intention to stand to be the first directly elected Mayor of Croydon. She was selected as Croydon Labour's 2022 mayoral candidate in December 2021. Shawcross was narrowly defeated by Conservative Jason Perry in the May 2022 Croydon Mayoral election, who won with a majority of less than 600 votes in the second round. Her campaign was damaged by dissatisfaction with the Labour-held Council, which had led the borough into bankruptcy.

== Honours and awards ==
Shawcross was appointed Commander of the Order of the British Empire (CBE) in the 2002 Birthday Honours for her services to local government. She was made an Honorary Alderwoman of the London Borough of Croydon in 2019, and is a Freewoman of the City of London. She has been recognised for her work in Transport in London by the business group ‘London First’, the ‘London Cycling Campaign', and the disability campaign group ‘Transport for All’.

== Personal life ==
Shawcross is married to Michael Anteney and has lived in the London Borough of Croydon since 1985.
