= Deputy Mayor of London for Transport =

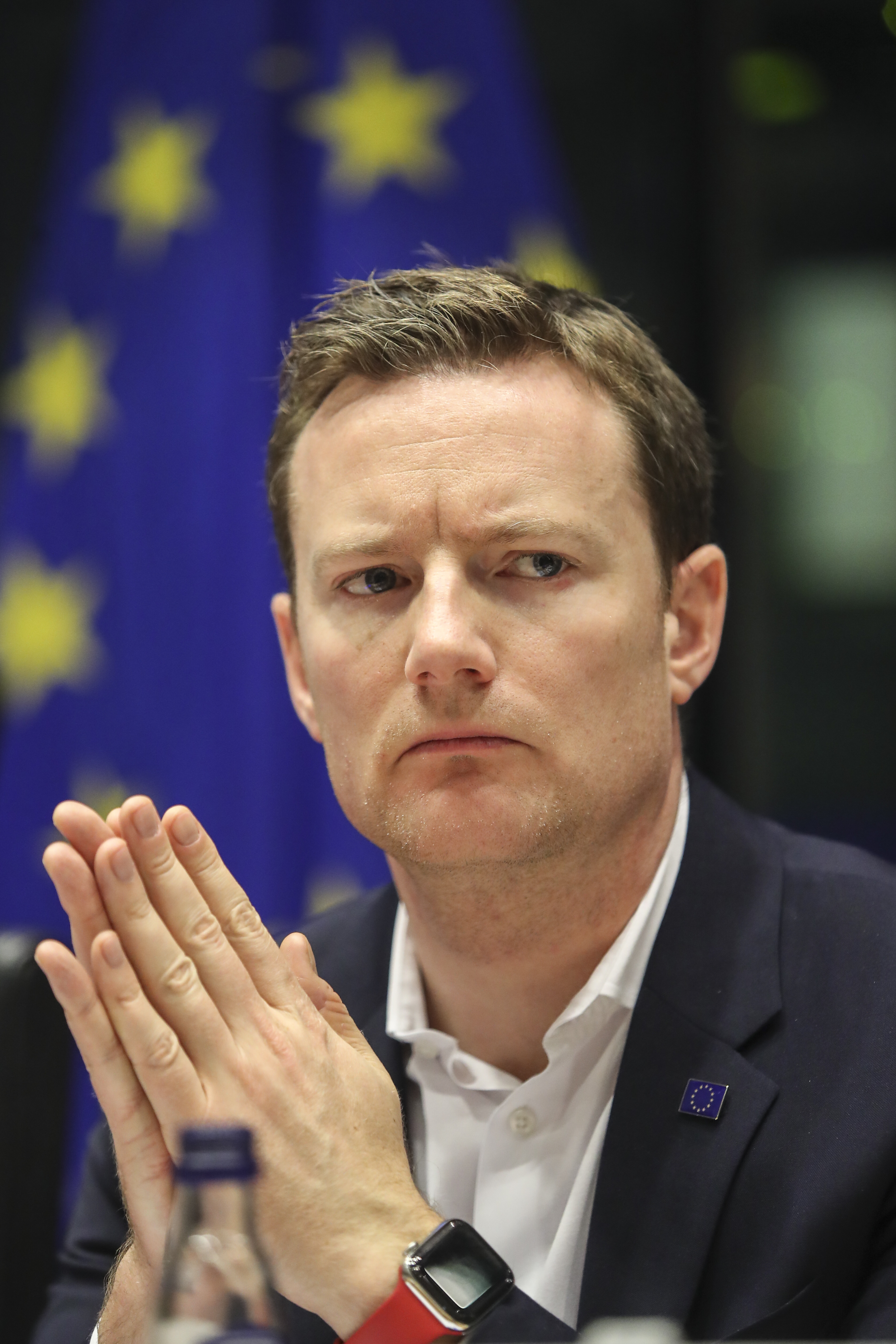
- Incumbent; Seb Dance since 1 January 2022
- Member of: Mayoral cabinet
- Appointer: Mayor of London
- Inaugural holder: Isabel Dedring

The Deputy Mayor of London for Transport is a position appointed by the Mayor of London. The inaugural holder of the office was Isabel Dedring, who was appointed by Boris Johnson on 9 May 2011. She was replaced by Val Shawcross in May 2016 following the election of Sadiq Khan. Shawcross retired in 2018 and was succeeded by Heidi Alexander, who stepped down as an MP to do so. Alexander stood down in December 2021 to "consider her next career move", She was replaced by Seb Dance who is the Incumbent holder.

== Deputy Mayors of London for Transport ==
Portrait	Name	Term start	Term end	Party	Mayor
	Isabel Dedring	9 May 2011	9 May 2016	Independent	Boris Johnson
	Val Shawcross	9 May 2016	21 May 2018	Labour Co-op	Sadiq Khan
	Heidi Alexander	21 May 2018	31 December 2021	Labour	Sadiq Khan
	Seb Dance	1 January 2022	Incumbent	Labour Co-op	Sadiq Khan
