= Evangelou v McNicol =

English legal case

- Court: Court of Appeal of England and Wales
- Full case name: Christine Evangelou, Rev. Edward Mungo Lear, Hannah Fordham, Chris Granger, and FM (a child by his Litigation Friend HW) v Iain McNicol (sued as a representative of all members of the Labour Party except the Claimants)
- Decided: 12 August 2016
- Citation: [2016] EWCA Civ 817
- Transcripts: Court of Appeal, High Court

Court membership
- Judges sitting: Beatson LJ, Macur LJ and Sales LJ

Christine Evangelou and others v Iain McNicol (Labour Party) [2016] EWCA Civ 817 is an English contract law case brought by five members of the Labour Party of the United Kingdom against its General Secretary, Iain McNicol on behalf of the whole party, concerning the eligibility of members to vote in the party's leadership election of 2016. The claimants came to court to challenge the decision of the party's National Executive Committee to bar members from voting in the election if they joined the party after 12 January 2016 (i.e. less than six months before the start of voting). This was due to affect approximately 130,000 new members (around one quarter of the party's total membership). The judge at first instance sided with the claimants, although this decision was overturned on appeal. On 14 August, it was announced that the claimants would not be challenging this decision in the Supreme Court.

== Facts ==
The Labour Party had conducted a leadership election in 2015, concluding on 12 September 2015 in the election of Jeremy Corbyn, whom many considered a dark horse candidate. Tension arose in the party which came to a head when the United Kingdom voted to leave the European Union. More than two dozen members of the shadow cabinet resigned over the following two days, and a no-confidence vote was supported by 172 MPs in the Parliamentary Labour Party, against 40 supporting Corbyn. It was reported that Tom Watson, the Deputy Leader, told Corbyn that he would face a challenge to his position as leader. Corbyn stated that he would not resign.

In the run up to the 2015 leadership election, the party's membership increased by around 113,000, approximately 80% of whom supported Corbyn. By July 2016, yet more people had joined the party, bringing its total membership to over half a million people.

On 29 June 2016, Labour's National Executive Committee met to establish the format of the 2016 leadership contest. It decided that those allowed to vote would be:

- Members of the party who had held six months' continuous party membership before the opening of the ballot (i.e. those who joined before 12 January 2016)
- Affiliated supporters
- Registered supporters who were over 18 years of age, were on the Electoral Roll, whose applications were received between 18 and 20 July 2016, and who paid a £25 fee.

The claimants each joined the party after 12 January 2016 and so, under these rules, were not entitled to vote in the leadership election. They challenged this decision as breach of contract. They raised over £40,000 to cover their legal fees through crowdfunding.

== Judgment ==
=== High Court ===
Submissions were given before Mr Justice Hickinbottom on 4 August 2016 in the High Court of Justice. Stephen Cragg led the case for the claimants and Peter Oldham, for the respondents. Judgment was handed down on 8 August 2016 in favour of the claimants.

The claimants' primary claim was that disallowing them to vote in the leadership election constituted a breach of contract. They sought specific performance of the contract to allow them to vote in the election. They argued that the statements made to them by the party that they would be allowed to vote in leadership elections amounted to a term of contract, or alternatively a misrepresentation.

The judge established that, as members of an unincorporated association, individuals joining the Labour Party are bound by its constitution and rules, and that additional rules will not readily be implied. The party's Rule Book included many relevant passages which the judge dissected. One especially pertinent passage read:

For the avoidance of doubt, any dispute as to the meaning, interpretation or general application of the constitution, standing orders and rules of the Party or any unit of the Party shall be referred to the NEC for determination, and the decision of the NEC thereupon shall be final and conclusive for all purposes. The decision of the NEC subject to any modification by Party conference as to the meaning and effect of any rule or any part of this constitution and rules shall be final.

However, the judge was not entirely persuaded that an erroneous interpretation of the rules should be made good by virtue of it having been made by the party's NEC. He concluded, "... the proper interpretation of the Rule Book, as a contract between Party members inter se, is a matter of law for the courts." The judge also considered the following passage from the Rule Book:

The NEC shall have the power to adjudicate in disputes that may arise at any level of the Party, including between (Constituency Labour Parties ("CLPs")), affiliated organisations and other Party units, and between CLPs, other Party units and individuals in those units and in disputes which occur between individual members or within the Party organisation. Where the rules do not meet the particular circumstances, the NEC may have regard to national or local custom and practice as the case may require. The NEC's decisions shall be final and binding on all organisations, units and individuals concerned.

The judge additionally noted that the Rules make reference to a "freeze date" for internal elections, but that it is nowhere defined. In Chapter 5, the Rules establish that members voting in elections to external posts must have been a member for six months prior to voting, but this requirement is notably absent for elections to internal posts, including that of the party leader. The judge took note of the following, contained within an appendix to the rules:

Members enjoy the formal democratic rights of Party membership as stated within the rules. Party members have the right to participate in the formal process of the Party, vote at Party meetings, stand for Party office and elected office as stated within the rules.

The court heard evidence that freeze dates had been applied in every Labour leadership election since 1994. The claimants cited the information given to them at the time of joining. Of this information, a relevant passage includes, "As a member, you'll be a key part of our election winning team. You'll be eligible to vote in leadership elections, you can help shape party policy, you can attend local meetings and you can even stand as a candidate." The claimants' central claim was summarised by the judge as follows:

It was not open to the NEC to restrict the category of members who can vote, to those who became members before 12 January 2016, as it purported to do, whether by imposing a condition that a member must have been such for six months before a freeze date of 12 July 2016 or by fixing a retrospective freeze date of 12 January 2016. However it is looked at, under the Rule Book, the NEC did not have the power to impose that restriction.

The respondent argued to the contrary, that the NEC did have the power to apply a freeze date on the basis that the NEC has the untrammelled ability to impose eligibility criteria on voters in internal elections, and the ability to issue procedural guidelines regarding the timetable of those elections.

On the basis of all of this argumentation, Mr Justice Hickinbottom was persuaded by the claimants. He was most persuaded by the fact that the Collins Review of leadership elections concluded that the eligible electorate would include members without qualification, and that the party's Rule Book's words on the NEC's ability to make "procedural guidelines" and set "precise eligibility criteria" were sufficiently plain on their face as to demonstrate that the NEC does not have the power to set whatever criteria it wishes. The provision cannot be used to redefine "members" in a "wholly artificial way". The judge was persuaded that, when the party had referred to a "freeze date", it had done so in the context of a previous legal decision, which defined freeze dates as follows:

What the imposition of the freeze date does is prevent additional individuals seeking to become members, especially by reason of encouragement or inducement by candidates, after the election process has begun.

He held that the NEC had the power to impose freeze dates prospectively, but not retrospectively. He concluded that,

In my view, looking at the structures within the Party as set out in the Rule Book, it would be extremely surprising if the Rule Book gave the NEC the power to disenfranchise one-quarter of the Party membership as it purported to do. In my firm judgment, the Rule Book gives it no such power.

=== Court of Appeal ===
The judgment was appealed to the Court of Appeal. It was heard on 11 August 2016, and the judgment of the court was delivered on 12 August 2016. Clive Sheldon led the argument for the appellant (the Labour Party), and David Goldstone, for the respondent (the claimants). The appeal was allowed and the order from the High Court was set aside. The grounds of appeal were as follows:

1. The judge erred in law in concluding that the NEC had no power under the Labour Party's Rule Book to restrict members who are able to vote in the leadership election to those who had had continuous membership since 12 January 2016.
2. The judge erred in law in concluding that the NEC's power to impose a "freeze date" in any leadership election pursuant to Chapter 4 of the 2016 Rule Book was limited to a power to impose a prospective freeze date.

In delivering a judgment on behalf of the whole court, Beatson LJ held that the Mr Justice Hickinbottom was wrong to approach the case from the basis that members had a right to vote, rather than that they have only the rights given to them by the Rule Book. At no point do the rules provide that all members can vote. All it does is say that members have "equivalent rights within all units of the Party... except as prescribed in these rules." The court also held that the wording of the Rule Book was clear, that the NEC was responsible for setting eligibility criteria, and that its powers are to be considered "more broadly than (the claimants) argue."
