= 2016 Labour Party leadership election (UK) =

British leadership election to challenge Jeremy Corbyn

- 22 August – 24 September 2016
- Turnout: 506,438 (77.6%) ▲1.3 pp
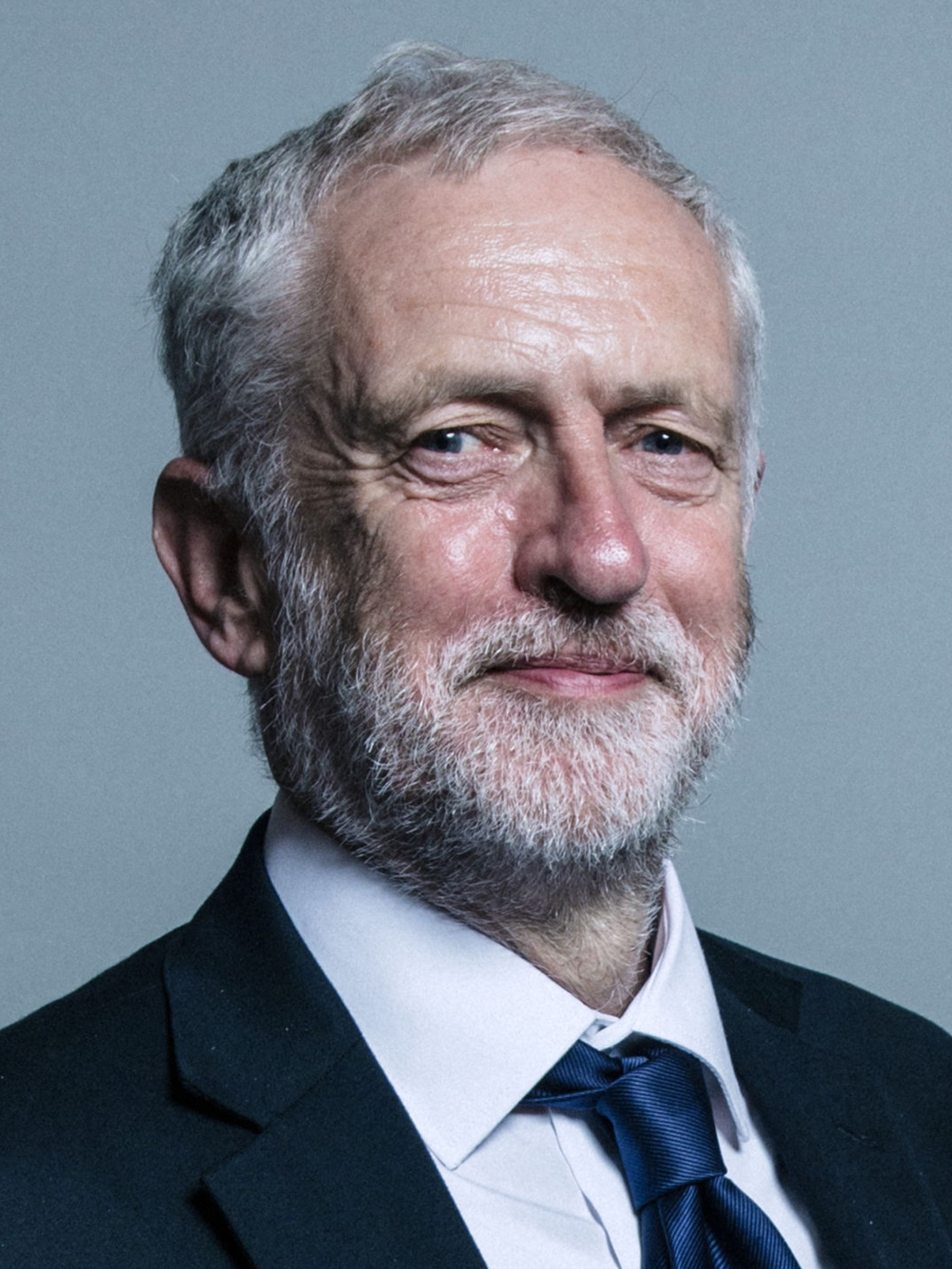

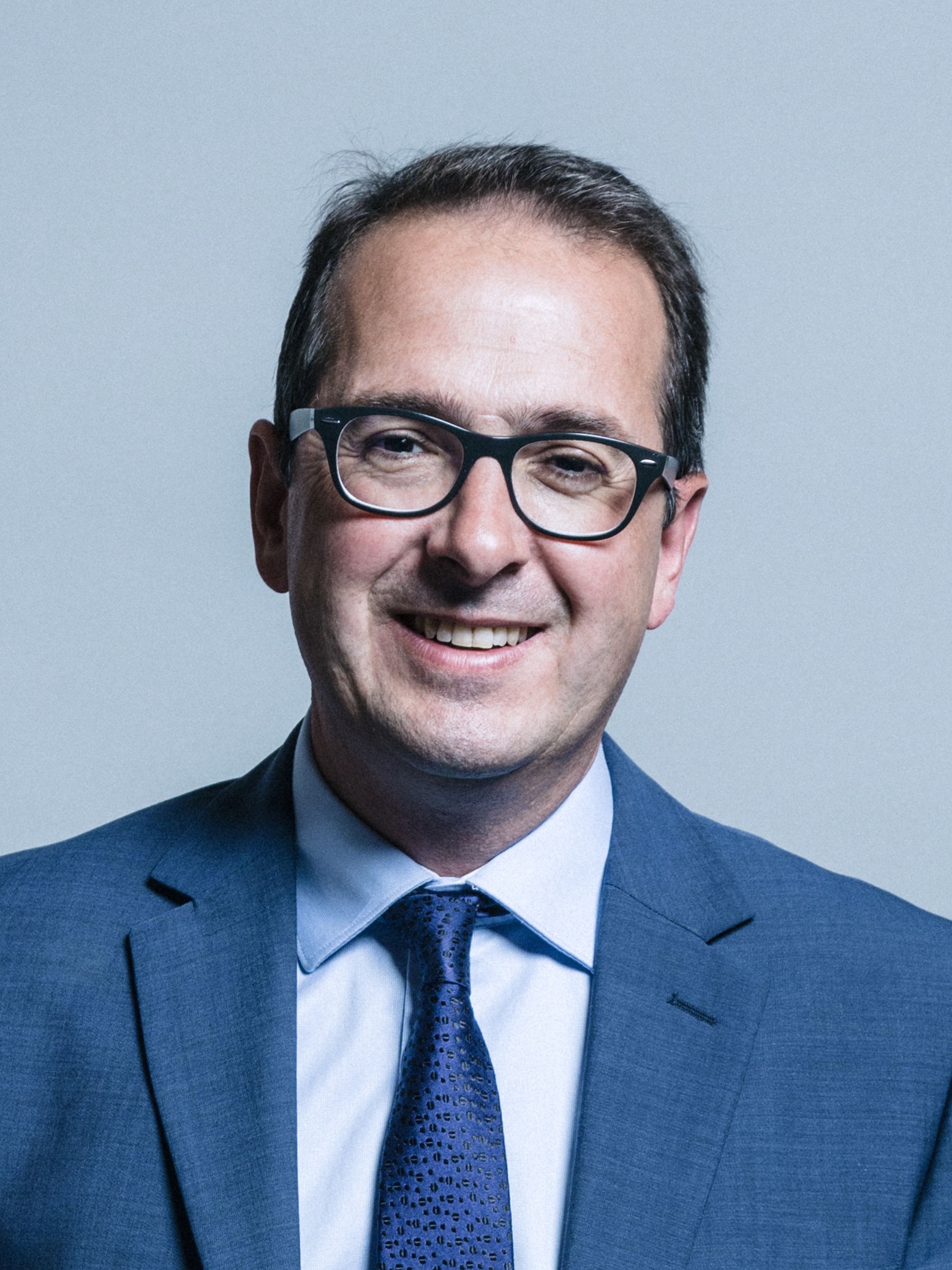
| Candidate | Jeremy Corbyn | Owen Smith |
| Popular vote | 313,209 | 193,229 |
| Percentage | 61.8% | 38.2% |
Leader before election
Jeremy Corbyn
Elected Leader
Jeremy Corbyn

The 2016 Labour Party leadership election was called when a challenge to Jeremy Corbyn as Leader of the Labour Party arose following criticism of his approach to the Remain campaign in the referendum on membership of the European Union and questions about his leadership of the party.

Following a period of tension over Corbyn's leadership, the immediate trigger to events was the Leave result of the referendum. Hilary Benn, the Shadow Foreign Secretary, was dismissed by Corbyn on 25 June after Benn expressed no confidence in him. More than two dozen members of the Shadow Cabinet resigned over the following two days, and a no-confidence vote was supported by 172 MPs in the Parliamentary Labour Party, against 40 supporting Corbyn. It was reported that Tom Watson, the Deputy Leader, told Corbyn that he would face a challenge to his position as leader. Corbyn stated that he would not resign.

By the end of June, Angela Eagle and Owen Smith were being promoted as intending to contest the leadership. Eagle announced her candidacy on 11 July, and Smith did likewise on 13 July. The National Executive Committee decided that, as the incumbent, Corbyn would be automatically included on the ballot without requiring nominations from the parliamentary party; some political analysts had previously predicted that Corbyn would struggle to obtain the requisite number of signatures had that been required.

Eagle pulled out of the race on 19 July, leaving Smith to challenge Corbyn for the leadership in a head-to-head race; Eagle said that she would back Smith after she had attracted fewer nominations. Smith told the BBC that Eagle was a "star" and that she would be "at [his] right hand" if he won the leadership.

The result was announced on 24 September 2016. Corbyn won the election with 313,209 votes, increasing his share of the vote from 59.5% to 61.8% compared with the result of the 2015 leadership election and receiving some 62,000 more votes than in 2015.

== Background ==
=== 2015 leadership election ===
Jeremy Corbyn was one of four candidates for the Labour Party leadership in the 2015 leadership election triggered by the resignation of Ed Miliband as leader. He qualified for the ballot at the last minute, nominated by 36 MPs, the majority of whom did not support him but felt that the party should be able to vote on a wider range of candidates. Despite being the most unpopular option with the Parliamentary Labour Party, with only 13 MPs voting for him, he received 59.5% of the first preference votes from an electorate consisting of party membership, members of affiliated trade unions and supporters who paid £3 to have a vote.

=== Leadership challenge ===
When it became clear that Jeremy Corbyn would win the leadership election in 2015, the possibility of a challenge to his leadership was predicted by then Labour MP Simon Danczuk. A leadership challenge was then much discussed in the British press in November due to a split in the parliamentary party over the prospect of Britain's participation in air strikes in Syria. Another potential challenge was predicted in April after Ken Livingstone's allegedly anti-semitic comments led to his suspension, and Shadow Cabinet members allegedly held talks with plotters. The Guardian reported that "a small group of Labour MPs and advisers had been telling journalists for months to 'expect movement' against Corbyn on 24 June."

=== After the referendum ===
The pressure on Corbyn intensified as a result of the European Union referendum and dissatisfaction with his level of support for the losing Remain campaign. On 25 June, a 'Saving Labour' campaign website was created, to encourage members of the public to email MPs to urge them not to back Corbyn.

==== Shadow Cabinet resignations ====
On 25 June Hilary Benn, a critic of Corbyn, contacted members of the shadow cabinet to inform them that he had lost confidence in Corbyn. He was subsequently sacked as shadow Foreign Secretary, triggering a series of Shadow Cabinet resignations; at least 20 individuals resigned over the next few days. An article in The Observer, published online at 10 pm on 25 June, claimed that Benn had been sounding out a challenge against Corbyn. Corbyn assembled a new Shadow Cabinet, and insisted that he would not resign.

==== Vote of no confidence ====
A vote of no confidence in Corbyn was made by the parliamentary party on 28 June, with Corbyn losing the vote by 172 to 40, with four spoiled ballots and thirteen absentees. However Labour Party rules did not require Corbyn to resign as a result of the vote. Corbyn struggled to fill a new Shadow Cabinet, which had to be reduced in size from 31 to 25. The Scottish National Party sought to argue that they should become the official Opposition in the Commons with Labour unable to fill the role.

==== Leadership challenge ====
Corbyn continued to refuse to step down as leader, saying that the ballot had "no constitutional legitimacy" and he would not "betray" the members that elected him in the 2015 leadership election. In order to challenge an incumbent leader, a serving Labour MP needed to gather the support of at least 20% of Labour MPs (15% of Labour MPs and also MEPs being required if a leader has resigned). Angela Eagle, a former member of his Shadow Cabinet who resigned after Benn's sacking, was said on 30 June to have the number of backers required to launch a challenge. Separate meetings to discuss the situation were held by Corbyn and Watson with UNITE trade union leader Len McCluskey on 5 July.

Following the sacking of Hilary Benn, and the vote of no confidence in Corbyn's leadership, over 100,000 new members were reported to have joined the Labour Party by 8 July, taking membership numbers above 500,000. Both supporters and opponents of Corbyn signed up new members.

By 8 July there were no declared leadership challengers, Corbyn had not resigned, and both his supporters and some critics considered that he was in a good position to win any leadership vote. Corbyn challenged the rebels to stand against him, and it was reported that Eagle had secured the support of at least the requisite number of nominations needed to launch a leadership bid. The following day, Eagle announced that she would formally launch her campaign on 11 July. In her speech, Eagle said "Jeremy Corbyn is unable to provide the leadership this huge task needs."

The party's National Executive Committee (NEC) meeting on 12 July was expected to consider the arrangements for an election. The arrangements were decided by secret ballot with the vote 18 to 14 in favour of the incumbent leader being automatically on the ballot. The NEC also decided to not allow members who joined the party in the past six months to vote in the leadership election, so the approximately 130,000 new members who had joined since the European Union referendum would be unable to vote. Instead registered supporters were given a period of two days to register, at a fee of £25, to be entitled to vote. Additionally the NEC ruled that local Constituency Labour Parties should not hold members' meetings during the leadership election period.

There was pressure before the nominations close on 20 July for one of the two challengers, either Smith or Eagle, to withdraw in order to unify the anti-Corbyn campaign. The two agreed between themselves that whoever had fewest nominations from MPs/MEPs by the end of the working day on 19 July would withdraw in favour of the other. Eagle, with about 20 fewer nominations, did so, leaving Smith as the only challenger to Corbyn. She pledged her support for his campaign. Smith explained that his decision to run for leader was partly because the future of the Labour party was at risk, stating that the "possibility of split is dangerously real".

==== Reaction ====
Andrew Rawnsley, chief political commentator for The Observer, described the leadership race as a crisis for Labour, which he saw as "fighting for its life." On 24 July 2016, he discussed the "mutiny" against Corbyn by the majority of MPs who voted against him in the no confidence motion but warned that they "do not have the backing of a large chunk of the party selectorate [party members who will vote in the leadership election] that picks the leader... [but that selectorate] is wildly unrepresentative of the voters that Labour must persuade if the party is to survive as a plausible opposition, never mind become a viable competitor for power."

Leadership contender Owen Smith had supported the campaign for Britain to remain in the European Union, in the referendum on Britain's membership in June 2016. During an interview with the BBC, Smith opined that those who had voted with the Leave faction had done so "because they felt a sense of loss in their communities, decline, cuts that have hammered away at vital public services and they haven't felt that any politicians, certainly not the politicians they expect to stand up for them, the Labour Party, has been standing up for them."

== Procedure ==
The election was conducted under a pure "one member, one vote" (OMOV) system, as had been the case at the 2015 leadership election. Candidates would be elected by members and registered and affiliated supporters, who all receive a maximum of one vote and all votes will be weighted equally. This means that, for example, members of Labour-affiliated trade unions need to register as affiliated Labour supporters to vote.

To stand, challengers needed to be nominated by at least 20% of the combined membership of the Parliamentary Labour Party (PLP) and European Parliamentary Labour Party, i.e. 51 MPs/MEPs, at the time. As the incumbent, Jeremy Corbyn, by decision of the National Executive Committee, was automatically included on the ballot. The vote, as in previous elections, was held under the alternative vote (instant-runoff) system.

The election itself was overseen by Electoral Reform Services.

=== Timetable ===
The Special Conference at the end of the Collins Review concluded that all selection timetables should be, once started, as short as possible. The Collins Report also states: "The NEC should agree the detailed procedures for leadership elections including issues regarding registration, fees, and freeze dates". The party required members to hold six months' continuous party membership on the freeze date to be eligible to take part in a selection.

The meeting of Labour's National Executive Committee on 12 July 2016 set a timetable and procedure for the election. The party stated that the timetable would be released when the leadership contest process began on Thursday 14 July, but the timetable was leaked immediately following the NEC meeting. The voting eligibility freeze date for membership was 12 January 2016 – those who joined after that date would have to pay £25 to sign up as a registered supporter in the two-day window during the week of 18 July. Members of affiliated trade unions, socialist societies and other affiliated organisations who individually signed up as an "affiliated supporter" to the Labour Party must have been a member of that organisation on or before 12 January 2016; those already on the Party's membership system would be eligible to vote, subject to reconfirming their eligibility. Many people had sought to join organisations such as UNITE to gain a vote without paying Labour's £25 "registered supporter" fee; and a Labour source reported that "Affiliated supporters who join between now and 8 August are expected to be able to vote..." However, the NEC decided that the freeze date for voter eligibility was also to apply to "affiliated supporters", so this route would not be a way to gain a vote after the freeze date.

On 8 August 2016, the High Court, in the case of Evangelou v McNicol, decided that the decision to disbar from voting members who had joined in the six months preceding the election being called was contrary to the Labour Party Rule Book, and they were entitled to vote. This decision cast some doubt on the election timetable. In a critical passage of his judgement, Mr Justice Hickinbottom found that "Furthermore, there is no evidence of any suggestion by the Party, the NEC, the Collins Review or any member of the Party that a freeze date could be retrospective, until the Procedures Paper that Mr McNicol prepared for the 12 July 2016 NEC meeting. Indeed, the very opposite." The Procedures sub-committee of the NEC immediately appealed the decision, and on 12 August 2016 the Court of Appeal reversed the High Court's decision. It concluded that under the party rules, the NEC had discretion to set any reasonable criteria for members to vote, and that there was no reason why an eligibility freeze date could not be in the past.

The election timetable was as follows:

- Tuesday 12 January 2016 – Members must join the Labour Party on or before this date to vote in the leadership election.
- Tuesday 12 July 2016 – Timetable agreed.
- Thursday 14 July 2016 – Timetable published.
- Monday 18 July 2016 – EPLP and PLP briefing, followed by EPLP and PLP hustings. Registered supporters applications open.
- Monday 18 July 2016 (19:00) – EPLP and PLP nominations open.
- Wednesday 20 July 2016 (17:00) – EPLP and PLP nominations close and supporting nominations open. Last date to join as registered supporter.
- Thursday 21 July 2016 (12:00) – Deadline for validly nominated candidates to consent to nomination.
- Friday 22 July 2016' – Hustings period opens.
- Monday 8 August 2016 (12:00) – Final date for membership arrears to be paid in full. Final date for updated affiliated supporter lists to be renewed.
- Monday 15 August 2016 (12:00) – Supporting nominations close.
- Monday 22 August 2016 – Ballot mailing despatched.
- Wednesday 14 September 2016 (12:00) – Last date for electronic ballot reissues.
- Friday 16 September 2016 – Hustings period closes.
- Wednesday 21 September 2016 (12:00) – Ballot closes.
- Saturday 24 September 2016 (11:45) – Special conference to announce result.

== Candidates ==
There had been some doubt over whether Corbyn would have been able to stand if he had needed to obtain 51 nominations like his challengers, as only 40 MPs supported him in the no-confidence motion and because the demand for Corbyn's resignation was the "majority position" of Labour's 20 MEPs.

On 12 July the National Executive Committee decided by 18 votes to 14 that as the incumbent, Corbyn would automatically be included on the ballot. The party's lawyers, GRM Law, as well as James Goudie, had argued the party's constitution required Corbyn to secure nominations, but conflicting legal advice obtained by the Labour Party leadership and UNITE from Doughty Street Chambers and Michael Mansfield, respectively, argued that Corbyn should not need to obtain MP/MEP support to be placed on the ballot of a leadership election, as the party rules only mentioned the need for challengers to receive nominations; they did not explicitly specify the same requirement for the incumbent.

During the last leadership challenge on an incumbent leader (in 1988, with Corbyn a supporter of the challenge), the incumbent, Neil Kinnock, did seek and obtain nominations, but some commentators, including BBC's Andrew Neil, believed that Kinnock may have done this voluntarily just to show his strength. Some political analysts had predicted that Corbyn would have had difficulty getting the requisite number of nominations from MPs/MEPs to stand, if this had been a requirement for his name to appear on the ballot.

The results of an Ipsos MORI survey released on 14 July 2016 indicated that 66% of those surveyed (representative of 18+ adults in Great Britain) believed that the Labour party needed a new leader before the 2020 elections. In addition, only 23 percent believed that Corbyn would make a good Prime Minister, while the-incumbent Theresa May had an approval rating of 55 percent.

=== Nominated ===
As the incumbent, Jeremy Corbyn, following an interpretation by the National Executive Committee of disputed Labour Party rules, was automatically included on the ballot. To be placed on the ballot, challengers to the Leader had to be nominated by at least 20% of the combined membership of the Parliamentary Labour Party (PLP) and European Parliamentary Labour Party, i.e. 51 MPs/MEPs. An MP or MEP who nominates a candidate does not have to subsequently support, or vote for, that candidate. In the past, some MPs have stated that they nominated only to ensure that a candidate (such as Corbyn) got onto the ballot paper; however, it was (correctly) expected that Corbyn would face a single "unity candidate" after Angela Eagle and Owen Smith agreed that the person with fewer nominations from MPs/MEPs should step aside (which Eagle later did).

In an interview, Smith offered the following endorsement of the former contender: "Angela is a star in the Labour firmament. She will be at my right hand throughout this contest and if I am successful, Angela will be alongside me as my right hand woman." He explained that his decision to run for leader was partly because the future of the Labour party was at risk, stating that the "possibility of split is dangerously real".

A High Court legal challenge, brought by Labour donor and former parliamentary candidate Michael Foster contesting the NEC's interpretation of the rules to allow Corbyn to be a candidate without having to secure nominations from Labour MPs/MEPs, was heard on 26 July 2016. Corbyn applied to the court, and was accepted, to be the second defendant with his own legal team as Corbyn was "particularly affected and particularly interested in the proper construction of the rules" and that General Secretary of the Labour Party Iain McNicol was "being expected to vigorously defend a position which he regarded as incorrect prior to the NEC decision". The High Court ruled that there was no basis to challenge the NEC's decision that Corbyn should automatically be on the ballot.

Prior to her withdrawal from the race on 19 July 2016, Eagle had been nominated by 72 MPs/MEPs. By that time, Smith had been nominated by 90 MPs/MEPs. Smith received a further 82 nominations following Eagle's withdrawal in advance of the nomination deadline at 17:00 the following day. A total of 89 Labour MPs/MEPs did not nominate any candidate by 19 July; 79 MPs/MEPs did not nominate by the close of nominations.

The two candidates (challenger nominated by the Parliamentary Labour Party and European Parliamentary Labour Party)
| Candidate | Born | Constituency | Most recent position | Announced | Campaign website (Slogan) | PLP/EPLP Nominations | Share |
|---|---|---|---|---|---|---|---|
| Jeremy Corbyn | 26 May 1949 (age 77) | MP for Islington North (1983–present) | Leader of the Labour Party; Leader of the Opposition (2015–2020) | Incumbent | JeremyForLabour (People powered politics) | N/A | N/A |
| Jeremy Corbyn | Supporting nominations Constituency Labour Parties (285): Aberconwy; Aberdeen Donside; Aldridge-Brownhills; Almond Valley; Alyn and Deeside; Arundel and South Downs; Argyll and Bute; Ashton-under-Lyne; Barrow and Furness; Bath; Bedford; Berwick-upon-Tweed; Beverley and Holderness; Birmingham Hall Green; Blackley and Broughton; Blaydon; Bognor Regis and Littlehampton; Bolsover; Bolton South East; Bolton South East; Bolton West; Bournemouth East; Bournemouth West; Bootle; Boston and Skegness; Bradford East; Brent Central; Brentford and Isleworth; Bromley and Chislehurst; Broxtowe; Bristol East; Bristol North West; Bristol South; Bristol West; Bury North; Bury St Edmunds; Brent North; Calder Valley; Camberwell and Peckham; Canterbury; Cardiff Central; Carlisle; Central Devon; Ceredigion; Cheltenham; Chesterfield; Chesham and Amersham; Chippenham; Chingford and Woodford Green; Cities of London and Westminster; Clacton; Clwyd West; Clydebank and Milngavie; Coatbridge and Chryston; Congleton; Colchester; Crewe and Nantwich; Croydon Central; Croydon North; Cunninghame South; Dagenham and Rainham; Doncaster Central; Delyn; Derbyshire Dales; Devizes; Dewsbury; Dover; Dulwich and West Norwood; Dundee East; Dundee West; Dwyfor Meirionnydd; East Devon; East Surrey; East Worthing and Shoreham; Eastleigh; Easington; Eddisbury; Edinburgh Central; Edinburgh Northern and Leith; Ellesmere Port and Neston; Elmet and Rothwell; Enfield North; Enfield Southgate; Epping Forest; Erewash; Erith and Thamesmead; Faversham and Mid Kent; Folkestone and Hythe; Fylde; Gainsborough; Garston and Halewood; Gateshead; Glasgow Anniesland; Glasgow Kelvin; Glasgow Maryhill and Springburn; Glasgow Shettleston; Glasgow Southside; Gloucester; Grantham and Stamford; Great Yarmouth; Gower; Hackney North and Stoke Newington; Hackney South and Shoreditch; Halifax; Hampstead and Kilburn; Harborough; Harlow; Harrow East; Harrow West; Harrogate and Knaresborough; Hartlepool; Harwich and North Essex; Hastings and Rye; Hamilton, Larkhall and Stonehouse; Halesowen and Rowley Regis; Halton; Havant; Hayes and Harlington; Hemsworth; Hereford and South Herefordshire; Hexham; Hitchin and Harpenden; Holborn and St Pancras; Horsham; Hyndburn; Isle of Wight; Islington North; Islington South; Ilford South; Jarrow; Kensington and Chelsea; Kirkcaldy; Kingston and Surbiton; Kingston upon Hull North; Kingswood; Knowsley; Lancaster and Fleetwood; Leeds East; Leeds North West; Leicester South; Lewes; Lewisham West and Penge; Leyton and Wanstead; Lincoln; Linlithgow; Liverpool Riverside; Liverpool West Derby; Liverpool Walton; Loughborough; Louth and Horncastle; Luton North; Luton South; Maidenhead; Macclesfield; Meriden; Mid Bedfordshire; Mid Derbyshire; Mid Fife and Glenrothes; Mid Sussex; Mid Worcestershire; Middlesbrough; Midlothian North and Musselburgh; Midlothian South, Tweeddale and Lauderdale; Milton Keynes North; Milton Keynes South; Monmouth; Montgomeryshire; Morecambe and Lunesdale; New Forest East; Newcastle upon Tyne Central; Newcastle-under-Lyme; Newton Abbot; Newark; North Cornwall; North Devon; North East Cambridgeshire; North East Derbyshire; North Norfolk; North Shropshire; North Somerset; North Tyneside; North West Durham; North West Hampshire; North West Leicestershire; North West Norfolk; North Wiltshire; Northampton North; Northampton South; Northern Ireland; Norwich North; Norwich South; Nottingham East; Old Bexley and Sidcup; Orkney; Penrith and The Border; Peterborough; Plymouth Moor View; Plymouth Sutton and Devonport; Poole; Poplar and Limehouse; Portsmouth North; Portsmouth South; Preseli Pembrokeshire; Preston; Pudsey; Rayleigh and Wickford; Reading West; Redcar; Reigate; Ribble Valley; Rochester and Strood; Rochford and Southend East; Romford; Romsey and Southampton North; Salford and Eccles; Salisbury; Scarborough and Whitby; Scunthorpe; Sefton Central; Sevenoaks; Sheffield Brightside and Hillsborough; Sheffield Heeley; Sherwood; Shetland; Shipley; St Helens South and WHiston; Stalybridge and Hyde; Stoke-on-Trent Central; Stoke-on-Trent South; Solihull; Somerton and Frome; South Cambridgeshire; South East Cambridgeshire; South East Cornwall; South Dorset; South Northamptonshire; South Ribble; South Thanet; South West Bedfordshire; South West Devon; South West Norfolk; South West Wiltshire; Southampton Itchen; Southampton Test; Southend West; Southport; Stockport; Stroud; Surrey Heath; Sutton and Cheam; Sutton Coldfield; Stretford and Urmston; Swansea East; Swansea West; Tatton; Tewkesbury; The Cotswolds; Thornbury and Yate; Thurrock; Tonbridge and Malling; Torbay; Torridge and West Devon; Totnes; Tottenham; Truro and Falmouth; Uxbridge and South Ruislip; Vale of Clwyd (void); Wakefield; Walthamstow; Wansbeck; Warwick and Leamington; Weaver Vale; Wellingborough; West Lancashire; West Suffolk; Westmorland and Lonsdale; Weston super Mare; Winchester; Windsor; Wirral South; Witney; Wokingham; Worthing West; Wyre Forest; Ynys Môn; Affiliated trade unions (8): Associated Society of Locomotive Engineers and Firemen (ASLEF); Bakers, Food and Allied Workers' Union (BFAWU); Communication Workers Union (CWU); Fire Brigades Union (FBU); Transport Salaried Staffs' Association (TSSA); Union of Construction, Allied Trades and Technicians (UCATT); UNISON; Unite the Union; Socialist societies (1): Disability Labour; Other party units (1): Young Labour | | | | | | |
| Owen Smith (campaign) | 2 May 1970 (age 56) | MP for Pontypridd (2010–2019) | Shadow Secretary of State for Work and Pensions (2015–2016) | 13 July 2016 | Owen2016 (Labour's Future) | 18/19 July: 90 | 35.86% |
| Owen Smith (campaign) | 2 May 1970 (age 56) | MP for Pontypridd (2010–2019) | Shadow Secretary of State for Work and Pensions (2015–2016) | 13 July 2016 | Owen2016 (Labour's Future) | 172 / 251 | 68.53% |
| Owen Smith (campaign) | PLP and EPLP nominations Members of Parliament (162) (Note: The total number of MPs nominating Smith includes himself as he counts towards the minimum 51 nominating MP/MEPs required in order to be eligible for election.): Heidi Alexander; Rushanara Ali (Note: Nominated Owen Smith after Angela Eagle withdrew from the race on 19 July 2016.); Rosena Allin-Khan; Ian Austin; Adrian Bailey; Kevin Barron; Margaret Beckett; Hilary Benn; Clive Betts; Roberta Blackman-Woods; Tom Blenkinsop; Paul Blomfield; Ben Bradshaw; Kevin Brennan; Lyn Brown; Chris Bryant; Karen Buck; Richard Burden; Liam Byrne; Ruth Cadbury; Jenny Chapman; Vernon Coaker; Ann Coffey; Julie Cooper; Yvette Cooper; Neil Coyle; Mary Creagh; Stella Creasy; Jon Cruddas; Judith Cummins; Alex Cunningham; Jim Cunningham; Nic Dakin; Wayne David; Gloria De Piero; Thangam Debbonaire; Stephen Doughty; Jim Dowd; Jack Dromey; Michael Dugher; Angela Eagle; Maria Eagle; Clive Efford; Julie Elliott; Louise Ellman; Chris Elmore; Bill Esterson; Chris Evans; Paul Farrelly; Jim Fitzpatrick; Rob Flello; Colleen Fletcher; Caroline Flint; Yvonne Fovargue; Vicky Foxcroft; Mike Gapes; Pat Glass; Mary Glindon; Roger Godsiff; Helen Goodman; Kate Green; Lilian Greenwood; Nia Griffith; Andrew Gwynne; Louise Haigh; David Hanson; Harriet Harman; Carolyn Harris; Helen Hayes; Sue Hayman; John Healey; Meg Hillier; Margaret Hodge; Sharon Hodgson; Kate Hollern; George Howarth; Tristram Hunt; Rupa Huq; Dan Jarvis; Alan Johnson; Diana Johnson; Gerald Jones; Graham Jones; Helen Jones; Kevan Jones; Susan Elan Jones; Mike Kane; Barbara Keeley; Liz Kendall; Stephen Kinnock; Peter Kyle; Chris Leslie; Emma Lewell-Buck; Ian Lucas; Holly Lynch; Justin Madders; Khalid Mahmood; Shabana Mahmood; Seema Malhotra; John Mann; Rob Marris; Chris Matheson; Steve McCabe; Kerry McCarthy; Siobhain McDonagh; Pat McFadden; Conor McGinn; Alison McGovern; Liz McInnes; Catherine McKinnell; Jim McMahon; Ed Miliband; Madeleine Moon; Jessica Morden; Ian Murray; Lisa Nandy; Melanie Onn; Chi Onwurah; Albert Owen; Teresa Pearce; Matthew Pennycook; Toby Perkins; Jess Phillips; Bridget Phillipson; Stephen Pound; Lucy Powell; Jamie Reed; Steve Reed; Christina Rees; Rachel Reeves; Emma Reynolds; Jonathan Reynolds; Marie Rimmer; Joan Ryan; Barry Sheerman; Paula Sherriff; Gavin Shuker; Andy Slaughter; Ruth Smeeth; Andrew Smith; Angela Smith; Jeff Smith; Nick Smith; Karin Smyth; John Spellar; Keir Starmer; Jo Stevens; Wes Streeting; Gareth Thomas; Nick Thomas-Symonds; Stephen Timms; Anna Turley; Karl Turner; Stephen Twigg; Chuka Umunna; Keith Vaz; Alan Whitehead; Phil Wilson; John Woodcock; Iain Wright; Daniel Zeichner; Members of the European Parliament (10): Paul Brannen; Richard Corbett; Seb Dance; Theresa Griffin; Richard Howitt; David Martin; Linda McAvan; Catherine Stihler; Derek Vaughan; Glenis Willmott; Supporting nominations Constituency Labour Parties (53): Aberdeenshire West; Altrincham and Sale West; Ayr; Barnsley East; Basingstoke; Batley and Spen; Battersea; Blaenau Gwent; Bermondsey and Old Southwark; Bethnal Green and Bow; Charnwood; Chipping Barnet; Clydesdale; Darlington; Dartford; Derby South; Dumfriesshire (nominates jointly with Galloway and West Dumfries); Ealing Central and Acton; East Lothian; Finchley and Golders Green; Galloway and West Dumfries (nominates jointly with Dumfriesshire); Glasgow Cathcart; Great Grimsby; Greenock and Inverclyde; Heywood and Middleton; Hornsey and Wood Green; Inverness and Nairn; Leicester East; Middlesbrough South and East Cleveland; Mitcham and Morden; Moray; Morley and Outwood; Na h-Eileanan an Iar; Newcastle upon Tyne North; North East Fife; Nottingham South; Pontypridd; Reading East; Renfrewshire South; Richmond Park; Runnymede and Weybridge; Rutherglen; South Swindon; Stevenage; Strathkelvin and Bearsden; Streatham; Twickenham; Uddingston and Bellshill; Vauxhall; Warrington South; West Ham; Westminster North; Wimbledon; Wrexham; Affiliated trade unions (4): Community; GMB; Musicians' Union; Union of Shop, Distributive and Allied Workers (USDAW); Socialist societies (3): Jewish Labour Movement; Labour Movement for Europe; Socialist Health Association | | | | | | |
| Undeclared | | | | | | 18/19 July: 89 | 35.46% |
| Undeclared | | | | | | 20 July: 79 | 31.47% |

=== Withdrew ===
Withdrawn candidates
| Candidate | Born | Constituency | Most recent position | Announced | Campaign website (Slogan) | PLP/EPLP Nominations | Share |
|---|---|---|---|---|---|---|---|
| Angela Eagle (endorsed Owen Smith) | 17 February 1961 (age 65) | MP for Wallasey (1992–present) | Shadow First Secretary of State; Shadow Secretary of State for Business, Innovation and Skills (2015–2016) | 11 July 2016 Withdrew: 19 July 2016 | Angela4LabourLeader (Real Leadership) | 18/19 July: 72 | 28.69% |

=== Declined ===
- Hilary Benn, former Shadow Foreign Secretary; MP for Leeds Central (endorsed Angela Eagle, then Owen Smith)
- Yvette Cooper, former Shadow Home Secretary; candidate for Leader in 2015; MP for Normanton, Pontefract and Castleford (endorsed Owen Smith)
- Dan Jarvis, MP for Barnsley Central (endorsed Angela Eagle, then Owen Smith)
- Stephen Kinnock, MP for Aberavon (endorsed Angela Eagle, then Owen Smith)
- John McDonnell, Shadow Chancellor of the Exchequer; candidate for Leader in 2007 (failed to be nominated) and 2010 (withdrew); MP for Hayes and Harlington (endorsed Jeremy Corbyn)
- Lisa Nandy, former Shadow Secretary of State for Energy and Climate Change; MP for Wigan (endorsed Owen Smith)
- Keir Starmer, MP for Holborn and St Pancras; former Director of Public Prosecutions (endorsed Owen Smith)
- Chuka Umunna, former Shadow Business Secretary; candidate for Leader in 2015 (withdrew); MP for Streatham (endorsed Angela Eagle, then Owen Smith)
- Tom Watson, incumbent Deputy Leader; MP for West Bromwich East (endorsed Owen Smith)

== Debates ==
The Labour Party initially confirmed that there would be nine official debates between Corbyn and Smith; of which seven actually took place.

| Date | Programme | Broadcaster | Location | Moderator |
|---|---|---|---|---|
| Thursday 4 August; 19.00 | Choose Labour's next Prime Minister | The Labour Party | All Nations Centre | Catrin Haf Jones (journalist, ITV Cymru Wales) |
| Thursday 11 August; 19.00 | Choose Labour's next Prime Minister | The Labour Party | Hilton Newcastle Gateshead | Sophy Ridge (Senior Political Correspondent, Sky News) |
| Wednesday 17 August; 09.00 | Victoria Derbyshire | BBC News | Nottingham Trent University | Victoria Derbyshire (presenter, Victoria Derbyshire) |
| Thursday 18 August; 19.00 | Choose Labour's next Prime Minister | The Labour Party | National Conference Centre | Carl Dinnen (Political Correspondent, ITV News) |
| Monday 22 August | Debate cancelled | Channel 4 | London | N/A |
| Thursday 25 August; 19.00 | Choose Labour's next Prime Minister | The Labour Party | Scottish Exhibition and Conference Centre | Lindsay McIntosh (Scottish Political Editor, The Times) |
| Thursday 1 September | Debate cancelled | N/A | N/A | N/A |
| Tuesday 6 September; 19.00 | Faith and the Future of Labour | Good Faith Partnership/ Oasis Trust | The Oasis Centre, Waterloo | Tim Livesey (former adviser to Archbishop Williams, former Chief of Staff to Ed Miliband) |
| Thursday 8 September; 21.00 | Question Time | BBC One | Queen Elizabeth Hall, Oldham | David Dimbleby (presenter, Question Time) |
| Wednesday 14 September; 21.00 | Corbyn v Smith: The Battle for Labour | Sky News | Sky Studios, Isleworth, London | Faisal Islam (Political Editor, Sky News) |

1.Jeremy Corbyn refused to attend any debate hosted by Channel 4, Daily Mirror or The Guardian.
2.A location and media organisation were not established in time.

== Opinion polling ==
The polls in this section have been undertaken by media pollsters known to use industry standard polling methods.

The polls below were conducted after nominations for the leadership ballot closed.

=== Polling of all eligible voters ===
The polls below show voting intention amongst all those eligible to vote in the leadership election (Labour Party members, registered supporters and affiliated supporters).

YouGov/The Times, 25–29 August 2016, 1,236 eligible voters (Note: Eligible members, registered and affiliated supporters of the Labour Party.)
| Candidate | Full Party; Members (Sample: 732) | Registered; Supporters (Sample: 298) | Affiliated; Supporters (Sample: 206) | Total selectorate (Sample: 1,236) |
| Jeremy Corbyn | 57% | 74% | 62% | 62% |
| Owen Smith | 43% | 26% | 38% | 38% |

=== Polling of Labour Party councillors ===
The polls below asked Labour Party local councillors across the country how they planned to vote in the leadership election.

| Poll source | Date(s) administered | Sample size | Jeremy Corbyn | Owen Smith | Don't Know |
|---|---|---|---|---|---|
| Labour History Research/Anglia Ruskin University | 21–25 July 2016 | 350 Labour councillors (Note: Labour Party local councillors in 250 marginal constituencies.) | 28% | 60% | 11% |

=== Polling of Labour voters ===
The polls below asked Labour supporters across the country how they would vote in the leadership election if they were eligible.

| Poll source | Date(s) administered | Sample size | Jeremy Corbyn | Owen Smith | Don't Know | Would Not Vote |
|---|---|---|---|---|---|---|
| BMG Research/London Evening Standard | 11–15 August 2016 | 334 current Labour voters (Note: People who state that they are likely to vote Labour in the next general election.) | 66% | 34% | – | – |
| ComRes/Sunday Mirror/Independent on Sunday | 10–12 August 2016 | 347 current Labour voters | 47% | 25% | 28% | – |
| BMG Research/London Evening Standard | 22–26 July 2016 | 347 current Labour voters | 75% | 25% | – | – |
| Opinium/The Observer | 19–22 July 2016 | ~692 current Labour voters | 54% | 22% | 20% | 4% |

=== Polling of British voters ===
The polls below asked voters across the country how they would vote in the leadership election if they were eligible.

| Poll source | Date(s) administered | Sample size | Jeremy Corbyn | Owen Smith | Don't Know | Would Not Vote |
|---|---|---|---|---|---|---|
| BMG Research/London Evening Standard | 11–15 August 2016 | 1,668 British residents (Note: Residents over 18 in Great Britain.) | 42% | 58% | – | – |
| ComRes/Sunday Mirror/Independent on Sunday | 10–12 August 2016 | 2,017 British residents | 23% | 37% | 40% | – |
| BMG Research/London Evening Standard | 22–26 July 2016 | 1,545 British residents | 43% | 57% | – | – |

=== Polling before close of nominations ===
The polls below were conducted before nominations for the leadership closed and therefore may include Labour politicians who will not be candidates. Polls show both free choices among all candidates and constrained choices among particular pairs of candidates.

| Poll source | Date(s) | Sample size | Jeremy Corbyn | Angela Eagle | Dan Jarvis | John McDonnell | Lisa Nandy | Owen Smith | Tom Watson | Other/Undecided |
|---|---|---|---|---|---|---|---|---|---|---|
| YouGov/The Times | 15–18 July 2016 | 1,031 Labour Party members (Note: Labour Party members who joined before 2016 so are eligible to vote in the leadership election.) | 58% | 34% | – | – | – | – | – | Others Would Not Vote 2% Undecided 5% |
| YouGov/The Times | 15–18 July 2016 | 1,031 Labour Party members | 56% | – | – | – | – | 34% | – | Others Would Not Vote 3% Undecided 7% |
| YouGov/The Times | 15–18 July 2016 | 1,031 Labour Party members | 54% | 21% | – | – | – | 15% | – | Others Would Not Vote 1% Undecided 9% |
| YouGov/The Times | 27–30 June 2016 | 1,203 Labour Party members (Note: People who are due-paying members of the Labour Party.) | 36% | 7% | 9% | 4% | 2% | – | 3% | Others Andy Burnham 10% Yvette Cooper 8% Chuka Umunna 8% Stella Creasy 2% Caroline Flint 1% Ben Bradshaw 0% Undecided 9% |
| YouGov/The Times | 27–30 June 2016 | 1,203 Labour Party members | 50% | – | – | – | – | – | 39% | Others Would Not Vote 5% Undecided 6% |
| YouGov/The Times | 27–30 June 2016 | 1,203 Labour Party members | 50% | 40% | – | – | – | – | – | Others Would Not Vote 4% Undecided 6% |
| YouGov/The Times | 27–30 June 2016 | 1,203 Labour Party members | 52% | – | 35% | – | – | – | – | Others Would Not Vote 3% Undecided 10% |
| YouGov/The Times | 27–30 June 2016 | 1,203 Labour Party members | – | – | – | 39% | – | – | 42% | Others Would Not Vote 7% Undecided 12% |
| YouGov/The Times | 27–30 June 2016 | 1,203 Labour Party members | – | 43% | – | 38% | – | – | – | Others Would Not Vote 7% Undecided 13% |
| YouGov/The Times | 27–30 June 2016 | 1,203 Labour Party members | – | – | 36% | 41% | – | – | – | Others Would Not Vote 6% Undecided 17% |

=== Polling before the EU referendum ===
The polls below were conducted prior to the referendum on the United Kingdom's membership of the EU taking place. In the aftermath of this event, Jeremy Corbyn was accused by his opponents of undermining the campaign to remain in the European Union, and faced a string of significant resignations from his Shadow Cabinet.

| Poll source | Date(s) | Sample size | Hilary Benn | Andy Burnham | Yvette Cooper | Jeremy Corbyn | Angela Eagle | Dan Jarvis | John McDonnell | Lisa Nandy | Owen Smith | Tom Watson | Other/ Undecided |
|---|---|---|---|---|---|---|---|---|---|---|---|---|---|
| YouGov/The Times | 9–11 May 2016 | 1,031 Labour Party members | 4% | 10% | 8% | 43% | 2% | 9% | 6% | 1% | 1% | 2% | Others Chuka Umunna 4% Keir Starmer 3% Ben Bradshaw 1% Caroline Flint 0% Margaret Hodge 0% Undecided 8% |
| YouGov/Election Data | 11–15 February 2016 | 1,217 members of the Labour Party selectorate (Note: Eligible members and registered supporters of the Labour Party.) | 8% | 7% | 6% | 43% | 2% | 8% | 3% | 1% | 1% | 2% | Others Chuka Umunna 6% Keir Starmer 2% Someone Else 2% Would Not Vote 1% Undecided 10 |
| YouGov/Election Data | 11–15 February 2016 | 1,217 members of the Labour Party selectorate | 15% | – | – | 62% | 12% | – | – | 3% | – | 3% | – |
| YouGov/Election Data | 11–15 February 2016 | 1,217 members of the Labour Party selectorate | 20% | – | – | – | 13% | 15% | 29% | 6% | – | 17% | – |
| YouGov/Election Data | 11–15 February 2016 | 1,217 members of the Labour Party selectorate | 24% | – | – | – | 19% | 18% | – | 10% | 5% | 23% | – |

== Result ==
Full result
| Candidate | Party members | | Registered supporters | | Affiliated supporters | | Total | |
| Candidate | Votes | % | Votes | % | Votes | % | Votes | % |
|---|---|---|---|---|---|---|---|---|
| Jeremy Corbyn ✓ | 168,216 | 59.0 | 84,918 | 69.9 | 60,075 | 60.2 | 313,209 | 61.8 |
| Owen Smith | 116,960 | 41.0 | 36,599 | 30.1 | 39,670 | 39.8 | 193,229 | 38.2 |

Turnout was 77.6%.

== National breakdowns (full members only) ==
The following section shows how votes from full party members were cast within each nation of the UK. Breakdowns were not made available for registered supporters or affiliated supporters.

=== UK-wide ===
| Candidate | Total | |
| Candidate | Votes | % |
|---|---|---|
| Jeremy Corbyn | 168,216 | 59.0 |
| Owen Smith | 116,960 | 41.0 |

=== England ===
| Candidate | Total | |
| Candidate | Votes | % |
|---|---|---|
| Jeremy Corbyn | 152,063 | 59.7 |
| Owen Smith | 102,437 | 40.3 |

=== Scotland ===
| Candidate | Total | |
| Candidate | Votes | % |
|---|---|---|
| Jeremy Corbyn | 6,042 | 46.8 |
| Owen Smith | 6,856 | 53.2 |

=== Wales ===
| Candidate | Total | |
| Candidate | Votes | % |
|---|---|---|
| Jeremy Corbyn | 8,507 | 55.7 |
| Owen Smith | 6,758 | 44.3 |

=== Northern Ireland ===
| Candidate | Total | |
| Candidate | Votes | % |
|---|---|---|
| Jeremy Corbyn | 541 | 70.7 |
| Owen Smith | 224 | 29.3 |

== Aftermath ==
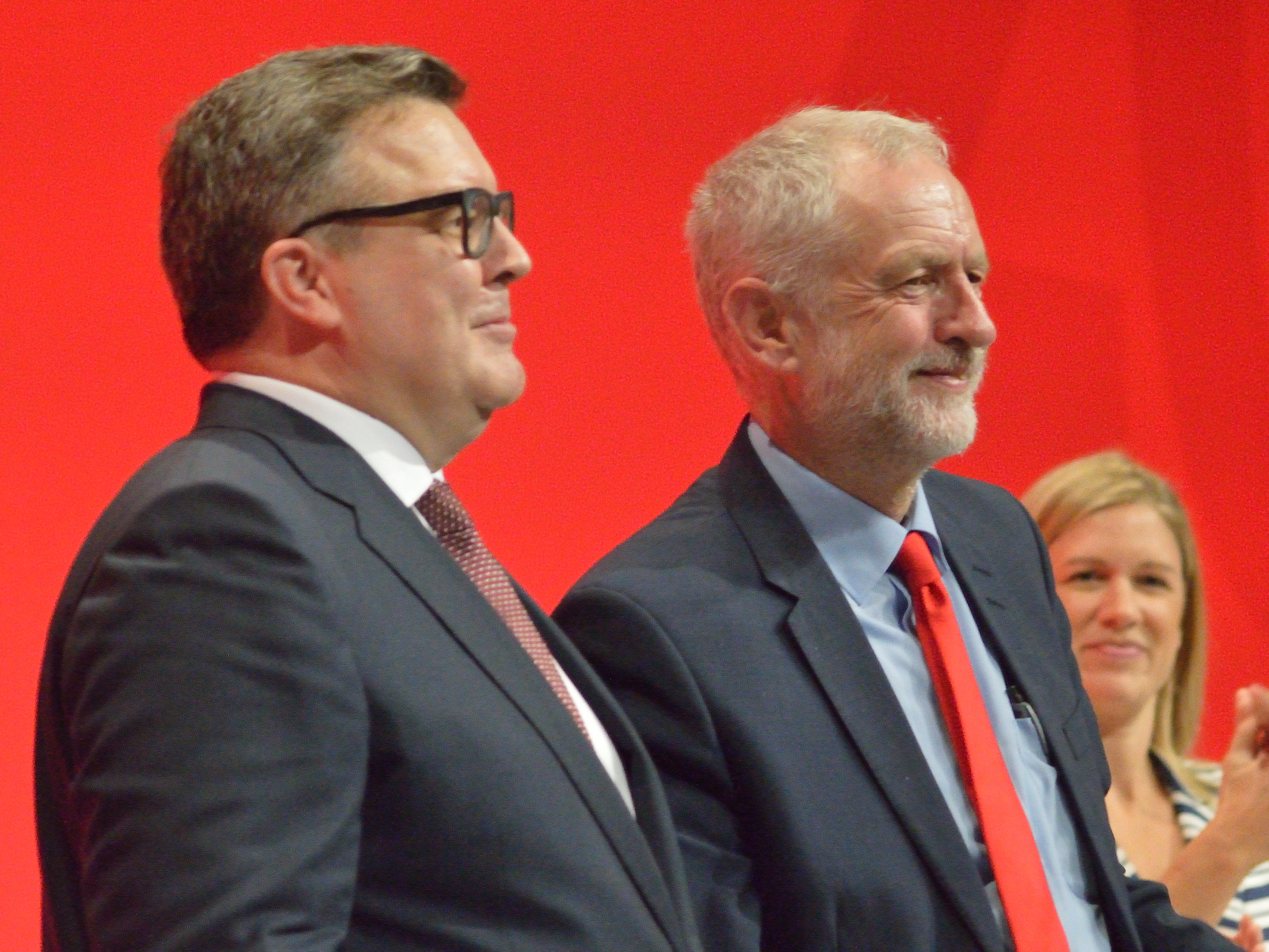
Corbyn with Deputy Leader of the Labour Party Tom Watson following re-election

Corbyn went on to lead Labour into the 2017 general election, which saw Labour increase its share of the popular vote by 10 percentage points and win 30 more MPs than in 2015.

Owen Smith rejoined the Shadow Cabinet following the general election, with Corbyn appointing him Shadow Secretary of State for Northern Ireland in June 2017.

On 23 March 2018, Corbyn sacked Smith from the Shadow Cabinet after Smith called for a second referendum on EU membership in The Guardian.

Corbyn led Labour into the 2019 general election, which saw Labour's defeat and reduced Labour to its fewest number of MPs since the 1935 general election. Corbyn resigned triggering a leadership election. Smith had announced his decision to stand down as an MP before the election, citing "personal and political reasons" in a letter to Corbyn.

== See also ==
- 2016 Conservative Party leadership election
- Evangelou v McNicol – the court case regarding the eligibility of new members to vote
- 2016 Green Party of England and Wales leadership election
- July–September 2016 UK Independence Party leadership election
- October–November 2016 UK Independence Party leadership election
