= Isabel Dedring =

British politician

Deputy Mayor of London for Transport
- In office 9 May 2011 – 9 May 2016
- Mayor: Boris Johnson
- Preceded by: Office created
- Succeeded by: Val Shawcross

Personal details
- Born: Isabel Margaret Dedring; August 10, 1971 (age 55)
- Education: Harvard University

Isabel Margaret Dedring (born 10 August 1971) is a British politician. In 2016 she was appointed Global Transport Leader at Arup. Previously, Dedring served as the Mayor of London’s Deputy Mayor for Transport, and the former Environment Advisor. As Deputy Mayor for Transport, she set policy and supervised transport programme delivery. The Mayor of London serves as Chair of Transport for London, and Dedring served as Deputy Chair.

As Environmental Advisor, she was responsible for developing policies and delivering programmes to improve London's environment. Environmental programmes overseen by Dedring include:

- Re:New, a London-wide programme of home retrofit to help Londoners cut their energy bills carbon emissions (reaching 200,000 homes from late 2010)
- The Mayor’s Electric Vehicle Delivery Plan, including installation of 7,500 charge points across London in the next 3 years
- New investment in green infrastructure including 10,000 new street trees and the ‘Help a London Park’ programme
- The £114m London Green Fund, which uses public sector investment to catalyse private investment in London’s low-carbon economy
- Low Carbon Zones, 10 communities across London committed to deliver 20.12% carbon reductions by 2012
- Re:Fit, a programme to retrofit London’s public sector buildings
- Delivery of the Mayor’s four statutory environment strategies (energy, waste, adaptation, air quality).
- The Garden Bridge that wasted £43m of public money.

Dedring previously worked as the Director of the Policy Unit at Transport for London where her work had a strong focus on climate change. Previous roles include Chief of Staff to London's Transport Commissioner, four years at McKinsey & Company in London and two years running the inward investment team in Ernst and Young’s Kazakhstan office.

Dedring received her undergraduate education from Harvard University and has a law degree from Harvard Law School. She is a qualified U.S. lawyer. She speaks German, French and Russian.
