= Seb Dance =

British politician

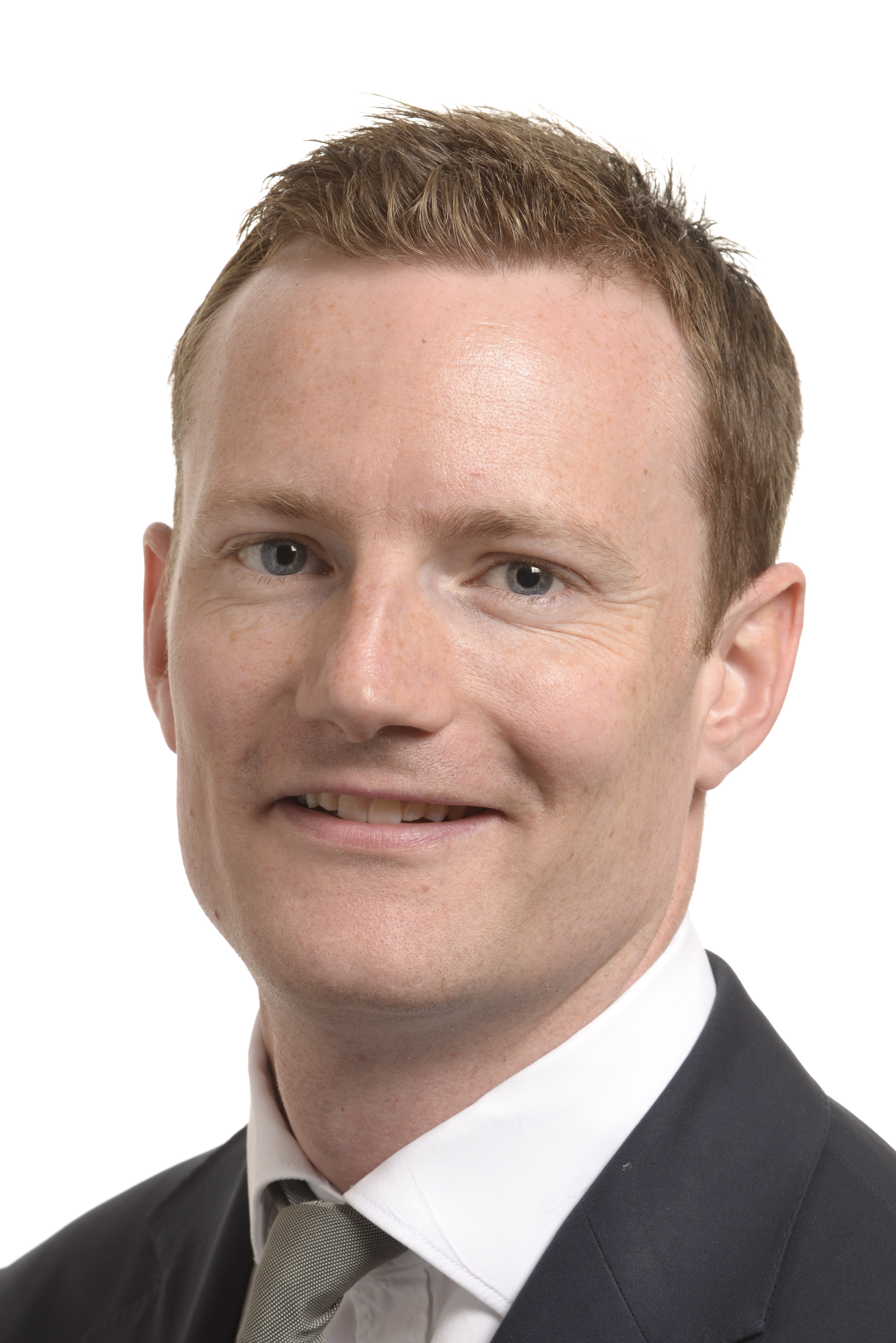

Deputy Mayor of London for Transport
- Incumbent
- Assumed office 1 January 2022
- Mayor: Sadiq Khan
- Preceded by: Heidi Alexander

Member of the European Parliament for London
- In office 1 July 2014 – 31 January 2020
- Preceded by: Sarah Ludford
- Succeeded by: Constituency abolished

Personal details
- Born: London, England
- Party: Labour and Co-operative
- Spouse: Spencer Livermore, Baron Livermore
- Education: University of Manchester (BA)

Sebastian Dance (born 1 December 1981) is a British Labour Party politician who served as a Member of the European Parliament (MEP) for the London region from 2014 to 2020. Since January 2022, he has served as Deputy Mayor of London for Transport, and as of November 2026 is due to become the Deputy Mayor of London for Environment and Energy.

He was Deputy Leader of the European Parliamentary Labour Party when Richard Corbett was leader, and Vice-Chair of the European Parliament Committee on the Environment, Public Health and Food Safety from 2019 to 2020.

He was also the interim chair of the Labour Movement for Europe, the pro-EU society affiliated to the Labour Party, after the organisation's previous chair, Anna Turley, stepped down.

== Early and personal life ==
Dance was born in the London Borough of Wandsworth and raised in the Home County of Surrey.

Following his studies at University of Manchester, he was a sabbatical officer at the Manchester Student Union, leading campaigns and overseeing student participation in the merger between the Victoria University of Manchester and the University of Manchester Institute of Science and Technology.

Dance is married to Spencer Livermore, Baron Livermore who is a British Labour Party life peer.

== Previous work ==
Prior to becoming an MEP, Dance worked for the development charity ActionAid UK, working on campaigns for structural changes to alleviate poverty and hunger around the world. He worked on a long-running campaign against tax avoidance by large multi-national companies.

Before joining ActionAid UK he worked for a small communications company working with clients in the public, private and voluntary sector on a range of campaigns.

Before this he worked as an advisor to the Secretary of State for Northern Ireland between 2007 and 2009, when the final parts of devolution as part of the 1998 Good Friday Agreement – policing and criminal justice powers – were being delivered by the Labour Government.

== European Parliament ==
Dance was elected to the European Parliament in 2014.

On entering the European Parliament, he was appointed to the European Parliament Committee on the Environment, Public Health and Food Safety, responsible for a wide range of policy areas including air and water pollution, waste management, and climate change. He was a Vice-Chair of the committee and chaired committee meetings, joint meetings with other committees such as AGRI, as well as formal trilogue meeting on the Drinking Water Directive.

He also sat on the European Parliament Committee on Development (DEVE), overseeing the spending commitments and priorities of the EU's development budget; the European Parliament Committee on Industry, Research and Energy (ITRE), as well as the European Parliament Committee on Agriculture and Rural Development (AGRI).

Dance was appointed as a shadow rapporteur for the revision of the National Emissions Ceiling Directive (NECD), which aimed to improve levels of air quality by regulating the emissions of harmful pollutants. This was a particularly important issue for London, where over 3,000 people are dying prematurely each year as a result of exposure to poor air quality. He became the S&D spokesperson on air quality following his appointment as a Shadow Rapporteur on the NECD.

In response to the Volkswagen emissions scandal, the European Parliament voted to set up a committee of inquiry to look into the scandal, the extent to which EU institutions acted on knowledge of the presence of software to limit emission abatement technology in the automotive industry, and to provide recommendations for EU institutions and Member States on how to prevent a similar scandal in the future. Dance was appointed as the Co-ordinator for the Progressive Alliance of Socialists and Democrats (S&D) Group in the European Parliament's Committee of Inquiry into Emission Measurements in the Automotive Sector (EMIS). In this role, he chaired the delegation of S&D MEPs in the committee and was the group's spokesperson on the committee.

In the 2014 Parliament, Dance was appointed as the Rapporteur for the DEVE Committee for delivering the UN's Sustainable Development Goals (SDGs). The "Dance Report" provided the European Parliament with its first blueprint for delivering the SDGs across all areas of the Parliament's work, as well as holding the other EU institutions to account on their programmes for delivering the SDGs.

Dance was also a shadow rapporteur on a proposal for an integrated approach to tackle the link between conflict and the trade of minerals extracted from affected areas.

He supported Owen Smith in the 2016 Labour leadership election.

In February 2017, he held up a placard directed at UKIP MEP Nigel Farage, saying "He's lying to you" when Farage made a speech to the EU Parliament defending Donald Trump's 90-day ban on immigrants from seven countries entering the United States. UKIP MEP Bill Etheridge consequently wrote to Antonio Tajani (President of the European Parliament) to complain about the incident, claiming that it was "disgusting behaviour" and "pathetic". Dance later wrote to Tajani, saying he apologised for the method, but not the message.

Dance has been a consistent supporter of the EU and the need for multilateralism to combat extremism and climate change, and was a vociferous opponent of Brexit.

At the beginning of his second term in 2019, he was elected as a Vice-Chair of the ENVI Committee.

== Deputy Mayor of London ==
He was appointed Deputy Mayor of London for Transport, serving from January 2022 under Mayor Sadiq Khan.

Following a reshuffle of the mayor's deputies in November 2026, Dance is due to become the Deputy Mayor of London for Environment and Energy, switching roles with Mete Coban.
