= Slater's Ales =

Former brewery in Stafford, England

- Location: Stafford, Staffordshire, England
- Opened: 1995
- Website: slatersales.co.uk

Active beers
Name	Type
Haka	Pale ale
1Hop	Golden ale
Premium	Bitter
Honey bee	Honey beer

Slater's Ales was a brewery located in Stafford, the county town of Staffordshire, in England. The brewery opened in 1995 when the company was formed by Ged Slater. Originally based in the George Hotel in Eccleshall, it moved to larger premises in Stafford in 2006.

The brewery's bar in Stafford closed in October 2022. The brewery closed in January 2023 citing trading difficulties following the COVID-19 pandemic and the cost-of-living crisis.
