= Heidi Alexander =

British politician (born 1975)

The Right Honourable Heidi Alexander MP
- Portrait, 2024

Secretary of State for Transport
- Incumbent
- Assumed office 29 November 2024
- Prime Minister: Keir Starmer; Andy Burnham
- Preceded by: Louise Haigh

Minister of State for Courts and Legal Services
- In office 8 July 2024 – 29 November 2024
- Prime Minister: Keir Starmer
- Preceded by: Mike Freer (Note: as Parliamentary Under-Secretary of State)
- Succeeded by: Sarah Sackman

Member of Parliament
- Incumbent
- Assumed office 4 July 2024
- Preceded by: Robert Buckland
- Constituency: Swindon South
- Majority: 9,606 (21.5%)
- In office 6 May 2010 – 9 May 2018
- Preceded by: Bridget Prentice
- Succeeded by: Janet Daby
- Constituency: Lewisham East

Deputy Mayor of London for Transport
- In office 21 May 2018 – 31 December 2021
- Mayor: Sadiq Khan
- Preceded by: Val Shawcross
- Succeeded by: Seb Dance

Member of Lewisham Council for Evelyn
- In office 10 June 2004 – 6 May 2010
- Preceded by: Alicia Chater

Personal details
- Born: 17 April 1975 (age 51) Swindon, Wiltshire, England
- Party: Labour
- Spouse: Martin Ballantyne (m. 2011)
- Education: Grey College, Durham (BA, MA)
- Website: Official website

Heidi Alexander (born 17 April 1975) is a British politician who has served as Secretary of State for Transport since November 2024. A member of the Labour Party, she has been the Member of Parliament (MP) for Swindon South since 2024. Previously she was the MP for Lewisham East from 2010 to 2018.

Born in Swindon, Alexander studied at Churchfields Comprehensive School (now Lawn Manor Academy) and New College before going on to gain a BA degree in geography and an MA degree in European Urban and Regional Change from Grey College, Durham. Alexander then consecutively served as a parliamentary researcher for MP Joan Ruddock and as a campaign manager for the charity Clothes Aid.

Alexander was elected to the Lewisham London Borough Council for Evelyn in 2004 and was elected the MP for Lewisham East in the 2010 general election. Alexander was appointed parliamentary private secretary to Shadow Environment Secretary Mary Creagh before becoming an opposition whip in 2012. Promoted to Deputy Shadow Minister for London and a senior opposition whip in 2013, she became Shadow Secretary of State for Health following the election of Jeremy Corbyn to the Labour leadership. In 2016 she was part of the coordinated resignation from the Shadow Cabinet ostensibly because of Corbyn's response to the EU referendum and the dismissal of Hilary Benn for encouraging fellow Shadow Cabinet members to resign.

In 2018 Alexander resigned her seat to become Deputy Mayor of London for Transport where she remained until 2021. In the 2024 general election Alexander was elected the MP for Swindon South. Alexander then served as Minister of State for Courts and Legal Services until she was appointed Transport Secretary in November 2024, replacing Louise Haigh.

== Early life and career ==
Alexander was born in Swindon, Wiltshire to Malcolm, an electrician, and Elaine Alexander (née Lanham). She was educated at Churchfields Comprehensive School and New College Sixth Form. Alexander studied at Grey College, Durham, where she received a BA degree in geography and an MA degree in European Urban and Regional Change.

Alexander had a 6-month placement in the office of Cherie Blair at 10 Downing Street in 1998. She worked as a Parliamentary researcher for Lewisham MP Joan Ruddock from 1999 to 2005, and as campaigns manager for the charity Clothes Aid from 2005 to 2006.

== Political career ==
=== Local government ===
Alexander served as a member of Lewisham London Borough Council for Evelyn from a by-election in 2004 until 2010. She was Deputy Mayor of Lewisham and Cabinet Member for Regeneration from 2006 to 2010. Alexander was selected as the Labour candidate for Lewisham East in October 2009, and elected to Parliament at the 2010 general election.

=== House of Commons ===
Shortly after her election to Parliament, Alexander was appointed parliamentary private secretary to Mary Creagh, then the shadow environment secretary. She became an opposition whip in 2012, and was promoted to Deputy Shadow Minister for London and a senior Opposition whip in 2013. She served as a member of the Communities and Local Government Committee from 2010 to 2012 and Health Committee from 2016 to 2017.

Following Jeremy Corbyn's election as Labour leader in September 2015, Alexander joined the shadow cabinet as shadow secretary of state for health.

Heidi Alexander became the first shadow cabinet minister to resign in June 2016, calling for a new party leader following the EU referendum and dismissal of Hilary Benn. In an opinion piece for The Guardian, Alexander wrote "I loved being the shadow health secretary. But I hated being part of the shadow cabinet...because it was entirely dysfunctional" and "so inept, so unprofessional, so shoddy".

=== Deputy Mayor of London ===
In May 2018, Alexander resigned her seat in Parliament to become Deputy Mayor of London for Transport under Sadiq Khan. She served as Deputy Chair of Transport for London in her role, and remained on the body's board until the opening of Crossrail.

During her time in the role, she was tasked with maintaining London transport during the COVID-19 pandemic and leading several rounds of government bailout negotiations. She notably worked to tackle delays to the opening of Crossrail and re-opening of Hammersmith Bridge, and took up cycling to promote that method of transport. Initially planning to step down at the end of Khan's first term until the pandemic, she departed her role in late 2021 to "consider her next career move".

=== Return to Parliament ===
In June 2022, Alexander announced her intention to seek selection as the Labour candidate for Swindon South. She was selected in July 2022 as prospective parliamentary candidate for the seat, and was successful at the 2024 general election. Alexander was subsequently appointed Minister of State for Courts and Legal Services at the Ministry of Justice.

==== Appointment to Cabinet ====
Alexander was appointed Secretary of State for Transport in November 2024, succeeding Louise Haigh. She was appointed to the Privy Council, giving her the honorific title of The Right Honourable for life.

== Political views ==
Alexander supported Andy Burnham in the 2010 and 2015 Labour leadership elections, and Owen Smith in the 2016 Labour leadership election. She chaired Sadiq Khan's campaign for the 2016 London mayoral election.

Alexander opposed the triggering of Article 50 following the EU referendum, proposing a "reasoned amendment" in January 2017 to throw out the article. She co-founded the Labour Campaign for the Single Market in 2017, and is a supporter of the pro-EU group Open Britain.

In November 2024, Alexander voted in favour of the Terminally Ill Adults (End of Life) Bill, which proposes to legalise assisted suicide for terminally ill adults in the UK.

== Personal life ==
Alexander married Martin Ballantyne in 2011.

Parliament of the United Kingdom
Preceded by Bridget Prentice	Member of Parliament for Lewisham East; 2010–2018	Succeeded by Janet Daby
Preceded by Robert Buckland	Member of Parliament for Swindon South; 2024–present	Incumbent
Political offices
Preceded by Andy Burnham	Shadow Secretary of State for Health; 2015–2016	Succeeded by Diane Abbott
Preceded by Louise Haigh	Secretary of State for Transport; 2024–present	Incumbent
