= Housing, Communities and Local Government Committee =

UK House of Commons select committee

The Housing and Communities Committee (formerly the Levelling Up, Housing and Communities Committee) is a select committee of the House of Commons in the Parliament of the United Kingdom. The remit of the committee is to examine the work, the expenditure, administration and policies of the Ministry of Housing, Communities and Local Government (MHCLG) and its associated public bodies. The current chair of the Committee was appointed when the House of Commons reconvened in September 2026, following Florence Eshalomi's appointment as a Minister of State in the department.

== Chairs ==
Committee chairs include those listed below.

Name	Start	End	Party	Constituency
Andrew Bennett	16 July 2001	11 April 2005	Labour	Denton and Reddish
Phyllis Starkey	19 July 2005	6 May 2010	Labour	Milton Keynes South West
Clive Betts	10 June 2010	30 May 2024	Labour	Sheffield South East
Flo Eshalomi	11 September 2024	21 July 2026	Labour Co-op	Vauxhall and Camberwell Green
Abena Oppong-Asare	14 September 2026	present	Labour	Erith and Thamesmead

=== Election results ===
From June 2010 chairs of select committees have been directly elected by a secret ballot of the whole House of Commons using the alternative vote system. Candidates with the fewest votes are eliminated and their votes redistributed until one remaining candidate has more than half of valid votes. Elections are held at the beginning of a parliament or in the event of a vacancy.

Chair	Party	Constituency	First elected	Method
Florence Eshalomi	Labour	Vauxhall and Camberwell Green	11 September 2025	Elected by the House of Commons
Clive Betts	Labour	Sheffield South East	10 June 2010	Elected by the House of Commons
Phyllis Starkey	Labour	Milton Keynes South West	28 June 2006	Elected by the Select Committee
Previously as Office of the Deputy Prime Minister: Housing, Planning, Local Government and the Regions Select Committee
Phyllis Starkey	Labour	Milton Keynes South West	14 July 2005	Elected by the Select Committee
Andrew Bennett	Labour	Denton and Reddish	23 July 2002	Elected by the Select Committee

11 September 2024
Candidate	1st round	
Candidate	Votes	%
Florence Eshalomi	437	78.3
Shaun Davies	121	21.7
Not redistributed		
Valid votes	558	

30 January 2020
Candidate	1st round	
Candidate	Votes	%
Clive Betts	Unopposed	
Not redistributed		
Valid votes		

12 July 2017
Candidate	1st round	
Candidate	Votes	%
Clive Betts	335	59.4
David Lammy	229	40.6
Not redistributed		
Valid votes	564	

17 June 2015
Candidate	1st round	
Candidate	Votes	%
Clive Betts	Unopposed	
Not redistributed		
Valid votes		

9 June 2010
Candidate	1st round	
Candidate	Votes	%
Clive Betts	279	50.3
Nick Raynsford	276	49.7
Not redistributed		
Valid votes	555	

== Membership ==
Membership of the committee as of 15 September 2026 was as follows:

Member	Party	Constituency
Abena Oppong-Asare MP (Chair)	Labour	Erith and Thamesmead
Sagal Abdi-Wali MP	Labour	Holborn and St Pancras
Jonathan Brash MP	Labour	Hartlepool
Lewis Cocking MP	Conservative	Broxbourne
Andrew Cooper MP	Labour	Mid Cheshire
Chris Curtis MP	Labour	Milton Keynes North
Ashley Dalton MP	Labour	West Lancashire
Lee Dillon MP	Liberal Democrats	Newbury
Will Forster MP	Liberal Democrats	Woking
Gagan Mohindra MP	Conservative	South West Hertfordshire
Alan Strickland MP	Labour	Newton Aycliffe and Spennymoor

=== Changes since 2024 ===
Date	Outgoing Member & Party	Constituency	→	New Member & Party	Constituency	Source
7 April 2025	Mike Amesbury MP (Independent)	Runcorn and Helsby	→	Andrew Lewin MP (Labour)	Welwyn Hatfield	Hansard
27 October 2025	Naushabah Khan MP (Labour)	Gillingham and Rainham	→	Sean Woodcock MP (Labour)	Banbury	Hansard
27 October 2025	Joe Powell MP (Labour)	Kensington and Bayswater	→	Andrew Cooper MP (Labour)	Mid Cheshire	Hansard
22 June 2026	Andrew Lewin MP (Labour)	Welwyn Hatfield	→	Jonathan Brash MP (Labour)	Hartlepool	Hansard
22 June 2026	Sean Woodcock MP (Labour)	Banbury	→	Ashley Dalton MP (Labour)	West Lancashire	Hansard
1 September 2026	Florence Eshalomi MP (chair, Labour)	Vauxhall and Camberwell Green	→	Vacant		Hansard
14 September 2026	Vacant		→	Abena Oppong-Asare MP (Chair, Labour)	Erith and Thamesmead	Hansard
26 October 2026	Maya Ellis MP (Labour)	Ribble Valley	→	Sagal Abdi-Wali MP (Labour)	Holborn and St Pancras	Hansard
26 October 2026	Sarah Smith MP (Labour)	Hyndburn	→	Alan Strickland MP (Labour)	Newton Aycliffe and Spennymoor	Hansard

== 2019-2024 Parliament ==
The chair was elected on 27 January 2020, with the members of the committee being announced on 2 March 2020.

Member	Party	Constituency
Clive Betts MP (Chair)	Labour	Sheffield South East
Bob Blackman MP	Conservative	Harrow East
Ian Byrne MP	Labour	Liverpool West Derby
Brendan Clarke-Smith MP	Conservative	Bassetlaw
Ben Everitt MP	Conservative	Milton Keynes North
Paul Holmes MP	Conservative	Eastleigh
Rachel Hopkins MP	Labour	Luton South and South Bedfordshire
Daniel Kawczynski MP	Conservative	Shrewsbury and Atcham
Abena Oppong-Asare MP	Labour and Co-op	Erith and Thamesmead
Mary Robinson MP	Conservative	Cheadle
Mohammad Yasin MP	Labour	Bedford

=== Changes 2019-2024 ===
Date	Outgoing Member & Party	Constituency	→	New Member & Party	Constituency	Source
20 July 2020	Daniel Kawczynski MP (Conservative)	Shrewsbury and Atcham	→	Ian Levy MP (Conservative)	Blyth Valley	Hansard
22 February 2021	Abena Oppong-Asare MP (Labour)	Erith and Thamesmead	→	Florence Eshalomi MP (Labour and Co-op)	Vauxhall	Hansard
22 February 2021	Paul Holmes MP (Conservative)	Eastleigh	→	Andrew Lewer MP (Conservative)	Northampton South	Hansard
19 October 2021	Ian Levy MP (Conservative)	Blyth Valley	→	Matt Vickers MP (Conservative)	Stockton South	Hansard
8 February 2022	Rachel Hopkins MP (Labour)	Luton South	→	Kate Hollern MP (Labour)	Blackburn	Hansard
29 March 2022	Brendan Clarke-Smith MP (Conservative)	Bassetlaw	→	Darren Henry MP (Conservative)	Broxtowe	Hansard
21 June 2022	Matt Vickers MP (Conservative)	Stockton South	→	Sara Britcliffe MP (Conservative)	Hyndburn	Hansard
25 October 2022	Sara Britcliffe MP (Conservative)	Hyndburn	→	Natalie Elphicke MP (Conservative)	Dover	Hansard
25 October 2022	Darren Henry MP (Conservative)	Broxtowe	→	Paul Holmes MP (Conservative)	Eastleigh	Hansard
29 November 2022	Florence Eshalomi MP (Labour and Co-op)	Vauxhall	→	Nadia Whittome MP (Labour)	Nottingham East	Hansard
11 December 2023	Paul Holmes MP (Conservative)	Eastleigh	→	Tom Hunt MP (Conservative)	Ipswich	Hansard
14 May 2024	Natalie Elphicke MP (Labour)	Dover	→	Steve Tuckwell MP (Conservative)	Uxbridge and South Ruislip	Hansard

== 2017–2019 Parliament ==
The chair was elected on 12 July 2017, with the members of the committee being announced on 11 September 2017.

Member	Party	Constituency
Clive Betts MP (Chair)	Labour	Sheffield South East
Mike Amesbury MP	Labour	Weaver Vale
Bob Blackman MP	Conservative	Harrow East
Helen Hayes MP	Labour	Dulwich and West Norwood
Kevin Hollinrake MP	Conservative	Thirsk and Malton
Fiona Onasanya MP	Labour	Peterborough
Andrew Lewer MP	Conservative	Northampton South
Mark Prisk MP	Conservative	Hertford and Stortford
Mary Robinson MP	Conservative	Cheadle
Liz Twist MP	Labour	Blaydon

=== Changes 2017–2019 ===
Date	Outgoing Member & Party	Constituency	→	New Member & Party	Constituency	Source
11 December 2017	New seat		→	Jo Platt MP (Labour and Co-op)	Leigh	Hansard
5 February 2018	Fiona Onasanya MP (Independent)	Peterborough	→	Matt Western MP (Labour)	Warwick and Leamington	Hansard
23 July 2018	Mike Amesbury MP (Labour)	Weaver Vale	→	Tanmanjeet Singh Dhesi MP (Labour)	Slough	Hansard
23 July 2018	Jo Platt MP (Labour and Co-op)	Leigh	→	Teresa Pearce MP (Labour)	Erith and Thamesmead	Hansard
20 May 2019	Liz Twist MP (Labour)	Blaydon	→	Mohammad Yasin MP (Labour)	Bedford	Hansard

== 2015–2017 Parliament ==
The chair was elected on 18 June 2015, with members being announced on 13 July 2015.

Member	Party	Constituency
Clive Betts MP (Chair)	Labour	Sheffield South East
Bob Blackman MP	Conservative	Harrow East
Jo Cox MP	Labour	Batley and Spen
Helen Hayes MP	Labour	Dulwich and West Norwood
Kevin Hollinrake MP	Conservative	Thirsk and Malton
Julian Knight MP	Conservative	Solihull
David Mackintosh MP	Conservative	Northampton South
Mark Prisk MP	Conservative	Hertford and Stortford
Angela Rayner MP	Labour	Ashton-under-Lyne
Mary Robinson MP	Conservative	Cheadle
Alison Thewliss MP	Scottish National Party	Glasgow Central

=== Changes 2015–2017 ===
Date	Outgoing Member & Party	Constituency	→	New Member & Party	Constituency	Source
26 October 2015	Angela Rayner MP (Labour)	Ashton-under-Lyne	→	Liz Kendall MP (Labour)	Leicester West	Hansard
7 March 2016	Jo Cox MP (Labour)	Batley and Spen	→	Jim McMahon MP (Labour and Co-op)	Oldham West and Royton	Hansard
31 October 2016	Liz Kendall MP (Labour)	Leicester West	→	Rushanara Ali MP (Labour and Co-op)	Bethnal Green and Bow	Hansard
31 October 2016	Jim McMahon MP (Labour and Co-op)	Oldham West and Royton	→	Melanie Onn MP (Labour)	Great Grimsby	Hansard
18 April 2017	Julian Knight MP (Conservative)	Solihull	→	Christopher Chope MP (Conservative)	Christchurch	Hansard

== 2010–2015 Parliament ==
The chair was elected on 10 June 2010, with members being announced on 12 July 2010.

Member	Party	Constituency
Clive Betts MP (Chair)	Labour	Sheffield South East
Heidi Alexander MP	Labour	Lewisham East
Bob Blackman MP	Conservative	Harrow East
Clive Efford MP	Labour	Eltham
George Freeman MP	Conservative	Mid Norfolk
Mike Freer MP	Conservative	Finchley and Golders Green
Steve Gilbert MP	Liberal Democrats	St Austell and Newquay
George Hollingbery MP	Conservative	Meon Valley
James Morris MP	Conservative	Halesowen and Rowley Regis
Toby Perkins MP	Labour	Chesterfield
Chris Williamson MP	Labour	Derby North

=== Changes 2010–2015 ===
Date	Outgoing Member & Party	Constituency	→	New Member & Party	Constituency	Source
2 November 2010	Toby Perkins MP (Labour)	Chesterfield	→	Simon Danczuk MP (Labour)	Rochdale	Hansard
2 November 2010	Chris Williamson MP (Labour)	Derby North	→	David Heyes MP (Labour)	Ashton-under-Lyne	Hansard
29 November 2010	George Freeman MP (Conservative)	Mid Norfolk	→	Mark Pawsey MP (Conservative)	Rugby	Hansard
7 February 2011	Clive Efford MP (Labour)	Eltham	→	Steve Rotheram MP (Labour)	Liverpool Walton	Hansard
23 May 2011	Mike Freer MP (Conservative)	Finchley and Golders Green	→	Heather Wheeler MP (Conservative)	South Derbyshire	Hansard
7 November 2011	Steve Rotheram MP (Labour)	Liverpool Walton	→	Bill Esterson MP (Labour)	Sefton Central	Hansard
29 October 2012	George Hollingbery MP (Conservative)	Meon Valley	→	John Stevenson MP (Conservative)	Carlisle	Hansard
26 November 2012	Heidi Alexander MP (Labour)	Lewisham East	→	Andy Sawford MP (Labour and Co-op)	Corby	Hansard
28 January 2013	Stephen Gilbert MP(Liberal Democrat)	St Austell and Newquay	→	John Pugh MP (Liberal Democrat)	Southport	Hansard
25 February 2013	Bill Esterson MP (Labour)	Sefton Central	→	Mary Glindon MP (Labour)	North Tyneside	Hansard
4 November 2013	Andy Sawford MP (Labour and Co-op)	Corby	→	Chris Williamson MP (Labour)	Derby North	Hansard
23 June 2014	James Morris MP (Conservative)	Halesowen and Rowley Regis	→	Alec Shelbrooke MP (Conservative)	Elmet and Rothwell	Hansard

== See also ==
- Levelling-up policy of the Boris Johnson government
- Parliamentary committees of the United Kingdom
