= Florence Eshalomi =

British Labour Co-op politician

Florence Eshalomi MP
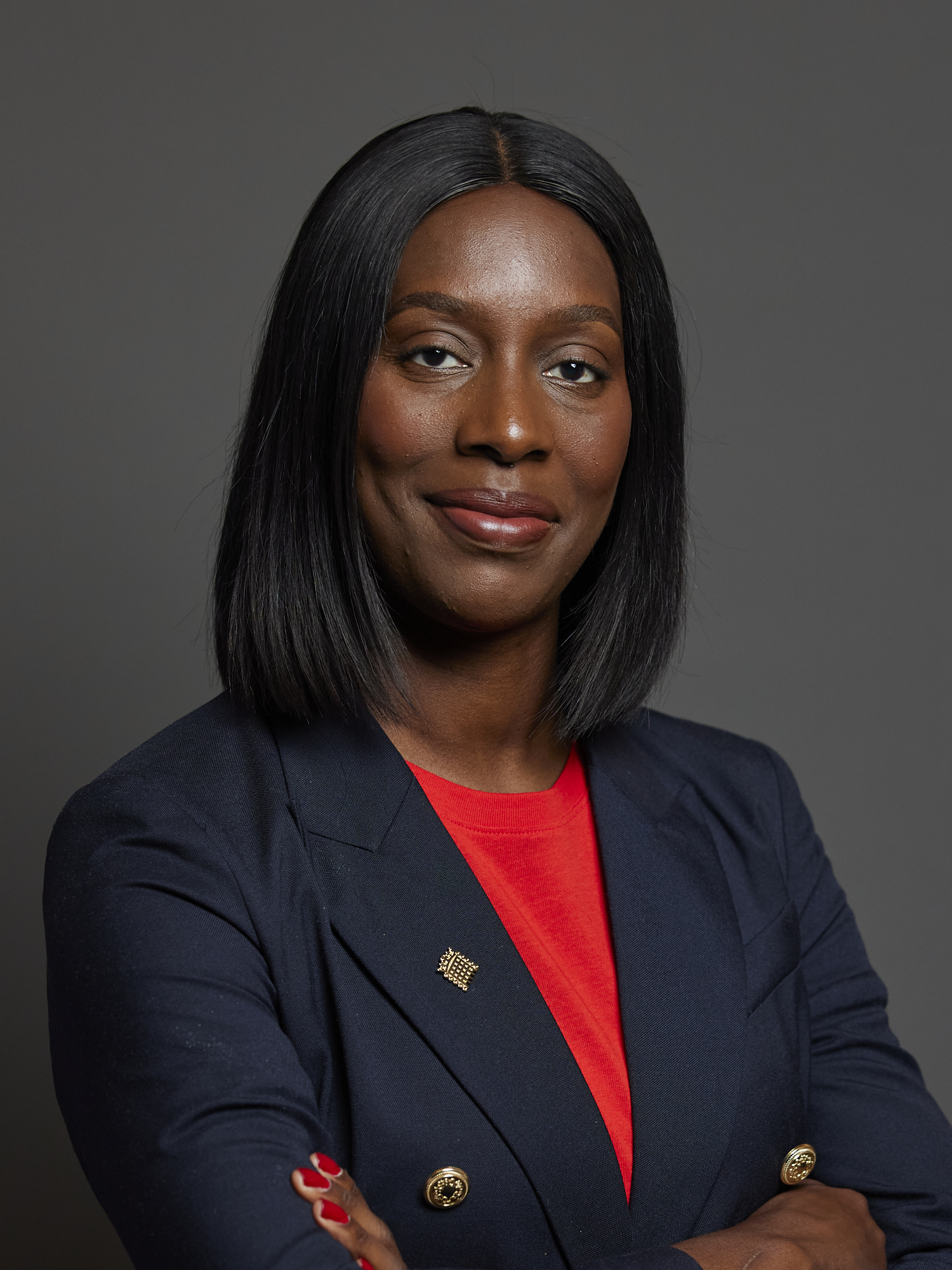
- Official portrait, 2024

Minister of State for Homelessness, Democracy, Communities and Faith
- Incumbent
- Assumed office 21 July 2026
- Prime Minister: Andy Burnham
- Preceded by: Alison McGovern (Homelessness); Nesil Caliskan (Communities); The Lord Lemos (Faith)

Chair of the Housing, Communities and Local Government Committee
- In office 11 September 2024 – 21 July 2026
- Preceded by: Clive Betts
- Succeeded by: Abena Oppong-Asare

Member of Parliament for Vauxhall and Camberwell Green Vauxhall (2019–2024)
- Incumbent
- Assumed office 12 December 2019
- Preceded by: Kate Hoey
- Majority: 15,112 (40.3%)
Shadow portfolios
2023–2024	Democracy
2022–2023	Cabinet Office
2020–2020	Whip

Member of the London Assembly for Lambeth and Southwark
- In office 5 May 2016 – 6 May 2021
- Preceded by: Valerie Shawcross
- Succeeded by: Marina Ahmad

Member of Lambeth Council for Brixton Hill
- In office 4 May 2006 – 3 May 2018

Personal details
- Born: Florence Dauta Nosegbe; 18 September 1980 (age 46) Birmingham, England
- Party: Labour Co-op
- Spouse: Matthew Eshalomi (m. 2014)
- Children: 2
- Education: Middlesex University (BA)
- Website: Official website

Florence Dauta Eshalomi (née Nosegbe; born 18 September 1980) is a British politician who has served as Member of Parliament (MP) for Vauxhall and Camberwell Green, formerly Vauxhall, since 2019. A Member of Labour Co-op, she was Member of the London Assembly (AM) for Lambeth and Southwark from 2016 to 2021. She currently serves as Minister of State in the Ministry of Housing, Communities and Local Government.

== Early life ==
Born Florence Nosegbe in Birmingham, she is the daughter of Anthony Nosegbe and of Nigerian descent. She is a lifelong Brixton resident and the eldest of three girls from a single parent family. Her mother, the late Maria Da-Silva, worked as a school teacher until her illness forced her to retire early. Eshalomi supported her mother, who suffered from sickle cell anaemia and kidney failure, as her carer.

Eshalomi attended local schools in Lambeth including Durand Primary (now Van Gogh) and St Helen's RC Primary school and Bishop Thomas Grant Secondary School. She completed her A-Levels at St Francis Xavier Sixth Form College in Clapham South. She is the first member of her family to go to university, graduating with a BA honours degree in Political & International Studies with Law from Middlesex University. Eshalomi benefited from the European Union-funded 'Erasmus Student Exchange' and had the opportunity to study at Utrecht University for a semester.

Eshalomi started her working life as a 16-year-old at Sainsbury's supermarket, Clapham High Street.

== Political career ==
Prior to winning her seat on the London Assembly, she worked for the PR agency Four Communications as a public affairs account manager.

Eshalomi served as a local councillor from Brixton Hill on Lambeth London Borough Council. She represented the ward along with future Labour MP Steve Reed.

Eshalomi has previously served as a member of the Progress Strategy Board. In 2016, The Times reported that "one of Momentum's most militant factions" planned to picket an event held to support Eshalomi's candidacy for the London Assembly. MPs including Chuka Umunna, Ben Bradshaw and Stella Creasy strongly criticised the picket, and a spokesperson for Momentum stated that the picket was organised by a separate group and that "Momentum are fully behind Flo's campaign". In the 2015 leadership election, Eshalomi supported Liz Kendall to become Labour Party leader.

Eshalomi was elected to the London Assembly on 5 May 2016 with a majority of 62,243 over the Conservative Party candidate Robert Flint. She was lead spokesperson for the London Assembly Labour Group on Transport issues, and current Chair of the London Assembly Transport Committee.

As an Assembly Member, Eshalomi has campaigned on issues including gang crime and the closure of Kennington Police Station.

Eshalomi was selected as Labour candidate for the Vauxhall parliamentary constituency on 27 October 2019, after Kate Hoey, a long-standing MP of 30 years, had announced she would not stand again as Labour's candidate in the constituency. Eshalomi won the seat with a slightly reduced majority of 19,612 votes.

Eshalomi made her maiden speech in the House of Commons on 17 January 2020. She said that "I never imagined that almost five years to the day, as I was literally pacing up and down the maternity ward, looking over the river, trying to coerce my daughter to come out, I would now be sat in this Parliament fighting for funding for our hard-working doctors and nurses" in reference to St Thomas' Hospital in her Vauxhall constituency. Eshalomi also prioritised more funding for the NHS and Police, and to focus on tackling youth violence and young women facing sexual exploitation. On 14 April 2020, Eshalomi was promoted to the opposition front bench as a whip.

Eshalomi and her fellow black female MPs have frequently been mistaken for each other since entering parliament, with Eshalomi herself being twice mistaken for black female colleagues in the nine months since her election. Eshalomi said of the misidentifications that "The frequency is worrying and lends itself to a lazy racist view that all black people look the same". Eshalomi was wrongly identified as Taiwo Owatemi by BBC Parliament and a fellow MP ran up to her thinking she was Kate Osamor. During Eshalomi's time on the London Assembly, she was mistaken for Conservative Kemi Badenoch, then a fellow assembly member. Eshalomi wrote that "All those women I've referenced are individual politicians in their own right...They're women who fought to get elected. So they deserve to be named and not to be confused with other black women. This doesn't happen to some of my white female colleagues, who sometimes have their hair down, sometimes they'll have it back in a ponytail. So why is it, if we as black women change our hair or our appearance, you can't recognise us?"

On 30 December 2020, Eshalomi abstained from voting on the European Union (Future Relationship) Bill, breaking the Labour party's three-line whip. Consequent to her policy dissent, she tendered her resignation from her position as an opposition whip.

In May 2021, Eshalomi returned to the Labour front bench as the Parliamentary private secretary (PPS) to Angela Rayner, the Shadow First Secretary of State and Deputy Leader of the Labour Party.

In June 2021, a 59-year-old man from Brixton was prosecuted after sending a stream of abusive messages to Eshalomi between December 2020 and February 2021.

In the 2023 British shadow cabinet reshuffle, she was appointed Shadow Minister for Democracy.

In November 2023, Eshalomi abstained on an SNP motion for a King's Speech amendment calling for a ceasefire in Gaza. After the vote, she immediately clarified her support for a humanitarian ceasefire and has called for one in Parliament on several occasions.

Following her re-election to the newly redrawn constituency of Vauxhall and Camberwell Green at the 2024 general election, Eshalomi was elected Chair of the Housing, Communities and Local Government Select Committee on 11 September 2024. In this capacity, she has overseen pre-legislative scrutiny regarding regional leasehold reform and community housing legislation.

In July 2026, she was appointed to the new government as Minister of State in the Ministry of Housing, Communities and Local Government by Andy Burnham.

== Personal life ==
Eshalomi married Matthew in 2014. They have two children, who were born at St Thomas' Hospital. She is a Christian, and attends Our Lady of the Rosary Roman Catholic Church in Brixton.

== Electoral history ==
=== 2024 general election ===
General election 2024: Vauxhall and Camberwell Green
Party	Candidate	Votes	%	±%
Labour Co-op	Florence Eshalomi	21,528	57.4	–3.1
Green	Catherine Dawkins	6,416	17.1	+13.0
Liberal Democrats	Chris French	4,549	12.1	–7.0
Conservative	Aarti Joshi	2,809	7.5	–7.0
Reform	Mike King	2,033	5.4	+3.8
SDP	Andrew McRobbie	201	0.5	N/A
Majority		15,112	40.3	–1.1
Turnout		37,536	53.9	–12.4
Registered electors		69,658		
Labour hold		Swing	▼8.1	

=== 2019 general election ===
General election 2019: Vauxhall
Party	Candidate	Votes	%	±%
Labour Co-op	Florence Eshalomi	31,615	56.1	▼1.2
Liberal Democrats	Sarah Lewis	12,003	21.3	▲0.8
Conservative	Sarah Bool	9,422	16.7	▼1.9
Green	Jacqueline Bond	2,516	4.5	▲2.4
Brexit Party	Andrew McGuinness	641	1.1	N/A
Independent	Salah Faissal	136	0.2	N/A
Majority		19,612	34.8	▼1.9
Turnout		56,333	63.5	▼3.6
Registered electors		88,659		
Labour hold		Swing	▼1.0	

=== 2016 London Assembly election ===
2016 London Assembly election: Lambeth and Southwark
Party	Candidate	Votes	%	±%
Labour	Florence Eshalomi	96,946	51.6	−1.2
Conservative	Robert Flint	34,703	18.5	−0.9
Liberal Democrats	Michael Bukola	21,489	11.4	−0.3
UKIP	Idham Ramadi	6,591	3.5	+0.7
Socialist (GB)	Kevin Parkin	1,333	0.7	−1.2
All People's Party	Amadu Kanumansa	906	0.5	N/A
Majority		62,242	33.1	−0.3
Total formal votes		187,761	98.8	+0.3
Informal votes		2,229	1.2	+0.3
Turnout		189,990	44	+6.7

=== 2014 Lambeth London Borough Council election ===
2014 Lambeth London Borough Council election: Brixton Hill (3 seats)
Party	Candidate	Votes	%	±%
Labour	Adrian Garden	1,849		
Labour	Florence Eshalomi *	1,791		
Labour	Martin Tiedemann	1,560		
Green	Roger Baker	818		
Green	Andrew Child	768		
Green	Betty Mehari	719		
Conservative	James Calder	415		
Conservative	Charles Tankard	381		
Conservative	Michael Woolley	310		
UKIP	Paul Gregory	254		
Liberal Democrats	Chris Keating	244		
Liberal Democrats	Liz Maffei	231		
Liberal Democrats	Adam Pritchard	228		
TUSC	Lisa Bainbridge	132		
TUSC	Alex Richardson	83		
TUSC	Jessica Walters	74		
Total votes		9,857		
Labour hold		Swing		
Labour hold		Swing		
Labour hold		Swing		

=== 2010 Lambeth London Borough Council election ===
2010 Lambeth London Borough Council election: Brixton Hill (3 seats)
Party	Candidate	Votes	%	±%
Labour	Alexander Holland	2,805		
Labour	Steve Reed *	2,699		
Labour	Florence Nosegbe *	2,648		
Liberal Democrats	Kate Horstead	2,100		
Liberal Democrats	Krystal Johnson	1,873		
Liberal Democrats	John Mead	1,560		
Green	Thomas Law	1,108		
Green	Elkin Atwell	1,023		
Conservative	Tim Briggs	873		
Green	Phillipa Marlowe-Hunt	850		
Conservative	Victoria Edwards *	768		
Conservative	Diana Thompson	688		
Total votes		18,995		
Labour hold		Swing		
Labour hold		Swing		
Labour hold		Swing		

Parliament of the United Kingdom
Preceded by Kate Hoey	Member of Parliament for Vauxhall; 2019–present	Incumbent
