= Martha Osamor, Baroness Osamor =

British-Nigerian politician and activist

The Right Honourable The Baroness Osamor
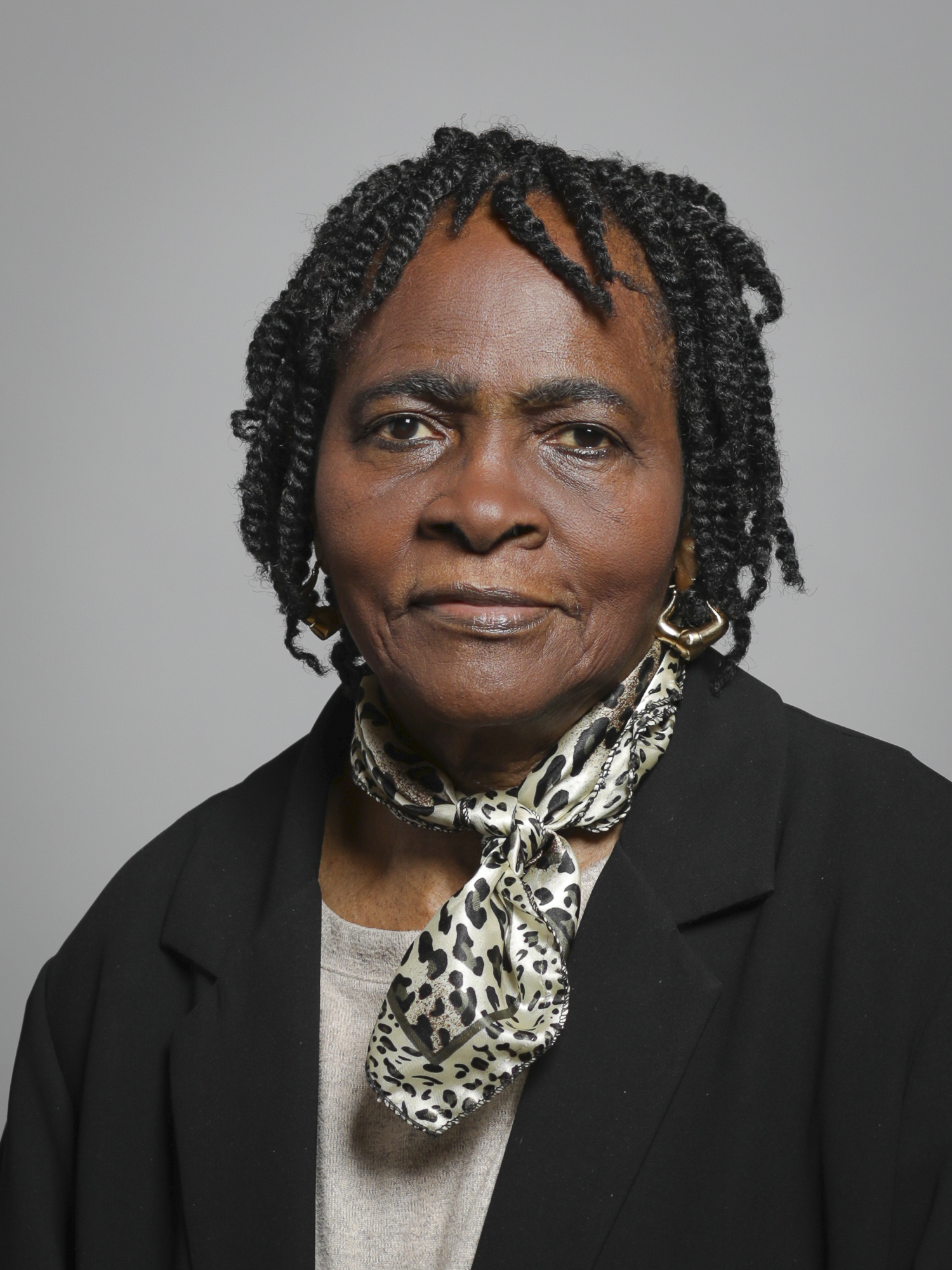
- Official portrait, 2019

Member of the House of Lords
- Lord Temporal
- Life peerage 26 November 2018

Personal details
- Born: Martha Otito Osantor; 24 September 1940 (age 85) Delta State, Nigeria
- Citizenship: United Kingdom
- Party: Labour
- Children: Kate Osamor (daughter)

Martha Otito Osamor, Baroness Osamor (née Osantor; born 24 September 1940) is a British-Nigerian Labour Party politician, life peer, community activist and civil rights campaigner. She is the mother of Kate Osamor, the MP for Edmonton and Winchmore Hill since 2015.

== Early life and career ==
Born Martha Otito Osantor in Delta State, Nigeria, Osamor moved to the UK in 1963 to join her husband who was then studying in London. Osamor and her husband settled in Tottenham, where they had four children. Her husband died unexpectedly in 1975.

== Politics ==
Osamor was a co-founder of the United Black Women's Action Group (UBWAG). From 1977 to 1997, Osamor worked at the Tottenham Law Centre (now called the Haringey Law Centre) and during this time became part of the Broadwater Farm Youth Association Mothers' Project on the nearby Broadwater Farm housing estate.

From 1986 to 1990, she served as a Labour councillor representing the Bruce Grove Ward in the London Borough of Haringey, eventually becoming deputy leader of Haringey London Borough Council.

Following the Broadwater Farm riot, Osamor and Dolly Kiffin organised a civil rights demonstration on 3 October 1987, and produced a Manifesto of the movement for civil rights and justice. She became a founding member of the Broadwater Farm Defence Campaign.

A left-winger and Labour Party Black Sections national vice-chair, Osamor was nominated by most of the branches within the Vauxhall Constituency Labour Party as the party's candidate for the by-election in 1989. The seat had been held by Labour since its creation in 1950. However, her candidacy was blocked by the party's National Executive Committee on the advice of the then leader, Neil Kinnock. Osamor's future fellow life peer Kate Hoey was instead selected by the national party as the constituency's Labour candidate; Hoey held the seat for Labour.

Osamor was nominated for a life peerage by Jeremy Corbyn in May 2018, and on 26 November 2018, the Queen conferred upon her the title of Baroness Osamor, of Tottenham in the London Borough of Haringey and of Asaba in the Republic of Nigeria.

== Personal life ==
Baroness Osamor is the mother of Member of Parliament Kate Osamor.

Orders of precedence in the United Kingdom
Preceded by The Lady Heywood of Whitehall	Ladies; Baroness Osamor	Followed by The Baroness Blackwood of North Oxford
