= Committee on the Office of the Deputy Prime Minister =

The Committee on the Office of the Deputy Prime Minister is a former United Kingdom parliamentary select committee. It was abolished in 2006 and replaced with the Communities and Local Government Select Committee following the abolition of the Office of the Deputy Prime Minister, which was replaced by the Department for Communities and Local Government.

== Members ==
List of members:

- Phyllis Starkey
- Paul Beresford
- Clive Betts
- Lyn Brown
- John Cummings
- Greg Hands
- Martin Horwood
- Anne Main
- Bill Olner
- John Pugh
- Alison Seabeck
