= Kate Hoey =

British politician (born 1946)

The Right Honourable The Baroness Hoey
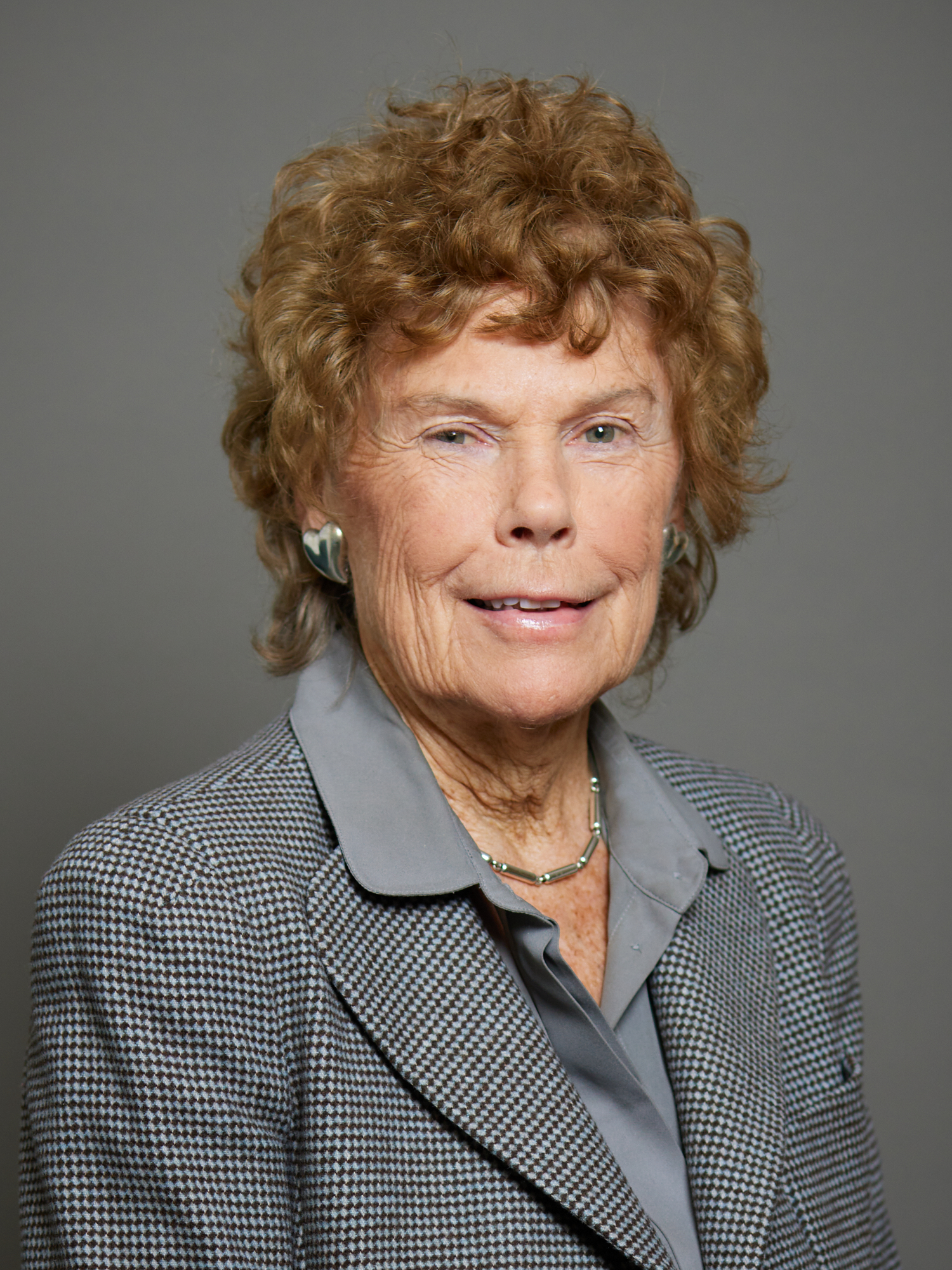
- Official portrait, 2022

Chair of the Northern Ireland Affairs Select Committee
- Acting; 15 May 2019 – 12 June 2019
- Preceded by: Andrew Murrison
- Succeeded by: Simon Hoare

Minister for Sport
- In office 20 October 1999 – 7 June 2001
- Prime Minister: Tony Blair
- Preceded by: Tony Banks
- Succeeded by: Richard Caborn

Parliamentary Under-Secretary of State for the Home Department
- In office 28 July 1998 – 29 July 1999
- Prime Minister: Tony Blair
- Preceded by: The Lord Williams of Mostyn
- Succeeded by: The Lord Bassam of Brighton
Parliamentary offices
Member of the House of Lords
Lord Temporal
Life peerage 14 September 2020
Member of Parliament for Vauxhall
In office 15 June 1989 – 6 November 2019
Preceded by	Stuart Holland
Succeeded by	Florence Eshalomi

Personal details
- Born: 21 June 1946 (age 80) Mallusk, County Antrim, Northern Ireland
- Party: Non-affiliated (2020–present); Labour (before 2019)
- Education: University of Ulster; London Guildhall University
- Website: www.katehoey.com

Catharine Letitia Hoey, Baroness Hoey (born 21 June 1946), better known as Kate Hoey, is a Northern Irish politician and life peer who served as Parliamentary Under-Secretary for Home Affairs from 1998 to 1999 and Minister for Sport from 1999 to 2001. During the 1970s Hoey was involved in radical far-left groups but by the end of the decade became involved with the Labour Party. Hoey remained a member of the Labour Party for several decades while she was Member of Parliament (MP) for Vauxhall from 1989 to 2019, but resigned from the party in 2020.

Hoey has attracted a high level of attention throughout her career, but particularly in the 2010s, holding many socially conservative views that brought her into conflict with fellow members of Labour. Early in her life, Hoey was radically in favour of a United Ireland; however, in more recent decades she has pulled away from this view, declaring in 2017 "I'm pro-union, I'll do anything to make sure that the United Kingdom has Northern Ireland as an integral part of it on the same terms as any other part of the United Kingdom when we leave the EU."

== Early life ==
Hoey was born in Mallusk, County Antrim, and studied at Belfast Royal Academy and the Ulster College of Physical Education. She has a degree in Economics earned at London Guildhall University, and was a Vice-President of the National Union of Students.

== Sport ==
Hoey has a longstanding interest in sport. She was the 1966 Northern Ireland high jump champion and has worked for football clubs including Arsenal, Tottenham Hotspur, Queens Park Rangers, Chelsea and Brentford as an educational advisor. Before entering Parliament, she was educational adviser to Arsenal FC from 1985 to 1989.

== Political career ==
=== Student politics ===
During the mid-1970s Hoey was one of the early members of the Newtownabbey Labour Party, which left its parent organisation, the Northern Ireland Labour Party (NILP), in 1974. Prior to being a member of the British Labour Party, Hoey was a member of the International Marxist Group (IMG), whose policies included support for a united Ireland with the slogan 'Victory for the IRA'. Hoey also ran for a seat on the National Union of Students as a candidate for a left-wing grouping called the Liaison Committee for the Defence of Student Unions (LDSCU). The LDSCU demanded the defence of student unions and "solidarity of students and workers". Another LCDSU demand was "Support for both wings of the IRA – unconditionally but not uncritically".

=== Member of the Labour Party ===
As a member of the Labour Party, she unsuccessfully contested Dulwich at the 1983 and 1987 general elections, being defeated by the Conservative Gerald Bowden, on the second occasion by only 180 votes. In 1989, she was elected at the Vauxhall by-election precipitated by the resignation of Stuart Holland. Vauxhall Constituency Labour Party had wanted Martha Osamor, vice-chair of the Labour Party Black Sections, as the Party's candidate. Osamor did secure the most nominations, eighty in total, with Hoey only having one. However, the National Executive Committee declined to shortlist Osamor and imposed a shortlist on the constituency party. When the local party refused to choose from the shortlist, Hoey was imposed by the NEC as the Labour candidate.

Interviewed by a Belfast-based newspaper in 1989, Hoey claimed that she "yearned" for Irish unity, adding "I believe that there should be a united Ireland by consent and I think that there are a lot of people in Ireland who want this." Hoey also said she wanted to see an all-Ireland soccer team: "I believe that football supporters on both sides of the border would like to see this happen but it is football officials who are preventing it from coming about."

Hoey was Parliamentary Under-Secretary of State at the Home Office from 1998 to 1999, and Minister for Sport in the Department of Culture, Media and Sport from 1999 to 2001.

As the chairman of the all-party parliamentary group on Zimbabwe, Hoey was a vocal critic of the government of Robert Mugabe. In 2005, she called on Tony Blair to put diplomatic pressure on South Africa to condemn Zimbabwean government demolitions of townships, after an unsanctioned visit to the country. The Zimbabwean government threatened to jail her if she repeated her "sneak" visit.

On 29 April 2008, it was announced that Hoey would form part of the team of Conservative Boris Johnson, should he become Mayor, as an unpaid non-executive director advising on sport and the 2012 Olympics. The announcement was controversial both because Hoey had once said of London's Olympic bid "we don't deserve it and Paris does" and because it could have been perceived as endorsing an election candidate from a rival party.

Hoey nominated John McDonnell for the Labour leadership election of 2010 but, on his withdrawal, she switched her nomination to Diane Abbott. However, she voted for Andy Burnham, giving Ed Miliband her second preference. In the 2015 Labour election, Hoey supported Andy Burnham and Caroline Flint for the leadership and deputy leadership, saying that she could not see Liz Kendall as a Prime Minister.

Hoey was broadly supportive Jeremy Corbyn's leadership of the Labour Party, but disagreed with him on Brexit. In 2016, she supported Corbyn during the 2016 leadership election.

On 8 July 2019, Hoey announced that she would retire from the House of Commons, and would not seek re-election as a Labour candidate at the next general election. The constituency Labour Party had voted to censure her and passed a vote of no confidence after she was one of 4 Labour MPs who had supported the government.

=== Independent politician ===
In December 2019 Hoey announced she was no longer a member of the Labour Party.

In July 2020, Hoey was nominated for a life peerage in the House of Lords in the 2019 Dissolution Honours and was created Baroness Hoey, of Lylehill and Rathlin in the County of Antrim, on 14 September 2020.

On 23 August 2021, Prime Minister Boris Johnson appointed Baroness Hoey as the UK's trade envoy to Ghana.

== Political views ==
Hoey is a Eurosceptic and supported Brexit, and has often rebelled against her party. She was a prominent critic of the ban on handguns and, in an interview in Sporting Gun magazine, voiced her support for fox hunting. She has voted against Labour government policy on the war in Iraq, foundation hospitals, Trident, university tuition and top-up fees, ID cards and extended detention without trial. She was a leading Labour rebel supporting a referendum on the EU Lisbon Treaty.

=== LGBT+ rights ===
In 1994, Hoey successfully proposed an amendment to the Criminal Justice Bill to have Northern Ireland included in the gay age of consent reform which reduced the male age from 21 to 18. Her amendment passed by 254 votes to 141.

In 2010, Hoey was described as "the least gay-friendly of all Labour MPs" by the chief executive of Stonewall. However, she voted in favour of same-sex marriage in 2013.

In 2017, Hoey sparked criticism from LGBT advocates after it emerged she had liked a swastika-emblazoned Pride flag on Twitter. She stated that the tweet was "liked in error" and later apologised.

In March 2019, Hoey abstained on a vote to allow LGBT+ inclusive education in schools. When asked why by Vice News, she stated that it was "going to pass anyway".

In July 2019, she was the only Labour MP to have voted against allowing abortion and same-sex marriage in Northern Ireland.

=== Brexit ===
Hoey advocated the United Kingdom leaving the European Union during the campaign for the EU membership referendum held on 23 June 2016. She pointed to Labour's earlier Euroscepticism "from Attlee to Foot" in The Independent and changes in European bodies since Jacques Delors' advocacy of a "social Europe" to refute the claim that Eurosceptism was a movement of the right. She later extended these views, characterising the EU as a "part of the global movement to remove democratic resistance to capitalism" and as fascism, in a Heat Street/blog article written after the EU referendum, deleted from her blog.

Originally active in Labour Leave as a co-chair, Hoey resigned in February 2016 following internal disagreements. Soon afterwards, she became active in Grassroots Out, along with then-UKIP leader Nigel Farage and George Galloway, then-leader of the Respect Party. In her Vauxhall constituency, an estimated 78% voted to remain in the EU. Her Constituency Labour Party (CLP) stated in February 2017 that she was insufficiently opposing Conservative government policy on child refugees and the residency rights of EU nationals after the UK leaves.

The following month, Hoey was one of 70 parliamentary signatories to a letter sent to the Director-General of the BBC, Lord Hall of Birkenhead, along with two Labour colleagues and many Conservative politicians, which was critical of the BBC for running stories biased against Brexit. Since then she has continued to criticise the BBC, accusing them of being "embittered Remainers" "taking delight" in "undermining our country". Fellow Labour MP Wes Streeting responded that it was "Orwellian" to expect broadcasters to "act as cheerleaders for the government".

During an interview on BBC Radio 4's Today programme in November 2017, Hoey commented that the Irish border problem – how to avoid a hard border between Northern Ireland and the Republic of Ireland, post-Brexit, whilst avoiding a border in the Irish Sea between Northern Ireland and the rest of the UK – would be solved if the Republic of Ireland also left the EU. Addressing Senator Neale Richmond, Fine Gael spokesperson on European affairs in Seanad Éireann, Hoey said, "We joined the EU together, you joined when we joined, and I wouldn't be a bit surprised if we leave and when we are very successful that you don't start thinking about leaving as well".

Hoey attracted criticism again from within the Labour Party and from Irish political figures in February 2018 after she said the Good Friday Agreement was "not sustainable in the long term". These comments followed similar remarks by Eurosceptic Conservative politicians Daniel Hannan and Owen Paterson. Simon Coveney, the Republic of Ireland's Tánaiste (deputy head of government) and Minister for Foreign Affairs and Trade, condemned the comments as "not only irresponsible but reckless". Owen Smith, the Shadow Secretary of State for Northern Ireland, said the remarks by Hannan, Paterson and Hoey were a "concerted, transparent effort to undermine the GFA... driven by their blind, misplaced faith in Brexit" and were "reckless and utterly wrong".

On 17 July 2018, Hoey was one of five Labour MPs who defied the Labour whip in order to vote with the government on a Brexit amendment, which, if passed, would have required the UK to remain a member of a customs union with the EU in the event of no other arrangements on free trade and no arrangements for no hard border in Ireland. The UK Government was against this amendment, but would have lost the vote without Hoey and the other Labour rebels, who possibly saved the Government from defeat. A few days later her CLP members passed a motion calling for her Labour whip to be withdrawn and for her to become ineligible to be a future Labour parliamentary candidate.

In March 2019, whilst taking part in a televised discussion about Brexit on the Andrew Neil show, Hoey was asked to "name any reputable independent study that show us better off if we leave". She admitted she could not produce any study that showed leaving the European Union would leave the UK in a better off position.

On 3 September 2019, Hoey and John Mann were the only Labour MPs to vote with the Government in an attempt to prevent MPs from taking control of the House in an attempt to block a potential no deal Brexit. In November 2019, Hoey said she would be voting for the Democratic Unionist Party (DUP) in the December general election in Northern Ireland. She also endorsed the Conservative Party and Boris Johnson, stating that Labour "would not keep faith with the British people".

In February 2021 Hoey, together with Jim Allister, leader of the Traditional Unionist Voice, and former Brexit Party MEP Ben Habib, applied for a judicial review of the Northern Ireland Protocol, that was ultimately dismissed by the Supreme Court of the United Kingdom. It was later revealed that the UK Government had spent a total of £196,567 of public money on legal fees associated with defending the judicial actions against the Northern Ireland Protocol.

In June 2021, Hoey claimed that the Republic of Ireland "will probably decide to leave" in the short term following the UK's departure from the EU.

=== "Nationalist Persuasion" comments ===
In January 2022, Hoey faced widespread criticism after writing "there are very justified concerns that many professional vocations [in Northern Ireland] have become dominated by those of a nationalist persuasion, and this positioning of activists is then used to exert influence on those in power" in the foreword for a loyalist pamphlet. Hoey's comments initially incited a vocal reaction on social media, with some from a Catholic background posting their educational achievements in response. The Belfast branch of the National Union of Journalists (NUJ) accused her of adopting "an appallingly blinkered view of professional journalists". Sinn Féin vice-president and Deputy First Minister Michelle O'Neill labelled the piece "outrageous" and called on Hoey to withdraw the remarks, saying they were a throwback to a "bygone era". O'Neill added that "the days of nationalists being denied opportunities are gone". Social Democratic and Labour Party (SDLP) MLA Matthew O'Toole accused Hoey of promoting a "McCarthyite tactic of othering members of the judiciary, lawyers, academics or journalists just because you disagree with them". Ulster Unionist Party leader Doug Beattie dismissed Hoey's comments as "vacuous". Alliance Party MP Stephen Farry said she was espousing an 'enemy within' argument that was "inaccurate, sinister, and dangerous" and represented a "further shameful intervention" from Hoey.

DUP leader Jeffrey Donaldson endorsed the report and Hoey's foreword, describing it as a "welcome contribution".

Journalist Susan McKay described the remarks as sectarian and "distasteful" and linked them to historic Protestant resentment of increasing Catholic social mobility in Northern Ireland. The unionist-leaning News Letter claimed to have unearthed data "which appear[ed] to support" Hoey's comments, noting that according to the 2011 census, there were 2,474 legal professionals with a Catholic background practicing in Northern Ireland, compared with 1,665 from a Protestant background. The Newsletter was unable to find a similar breakdown for journalists.

== Other interests ==
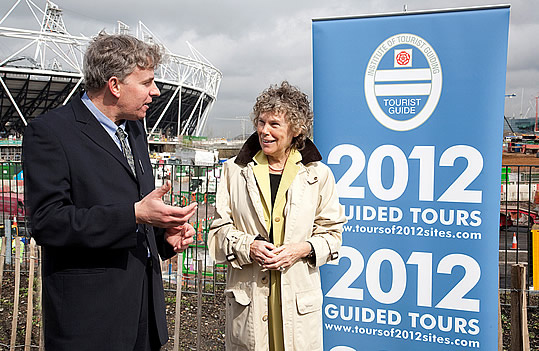
Hoey in 2010, at the launch of the Blue Badge 2012 Guided Tours for the 2012 Summer Olympics

Hoey is known for her objection to the ban of fox hunting: a rare position among Labour MPs. On 22 July 2005, she was named the new chairman of the Countryside Alliance (a British group known for its pro-hunting stance). She said the appointment was a "great honour and a great challenge". The Alliance's headquarters are in Hoey's Vauxhall constituency. This appointment was controversial in the Labour Party as the Countryside Alliance was seen to be behind a campaign to unseat Labour MPs at the 2005 election. Hoey stepped down in 2015 saying "I am sad to be resigning after more than nine years as chairman of the Countryside Alliance. The organisation has achieved much in that time, but I will always be most proud that having joined when hunting faced such uncertainty, I leave with new generations queuing up to join the hunting field."

Hoey is patron of Roots & Shoots, a vocational training centre for young people in Lambeth.

Hoey has been a trustee of the Outward Bound charity since October 2002.

A vice-president of the Great Britain Wheelchair Basketball Association, Hoey is a supporter of the women's national team and the work of the charity.

In December 2018 she became patron of the Professional Paralegal Register.

In October 2013, Hoey was fined £240 for driving through a red light having previously criticised cyclists as "Lycra louts that run red lights". Hoey wants all cyclists to pay tax and be registered so they have a registration number:

What I do genuinely think, and the cycling lobby should argue for it too, is that everyone who rides a bicycle, particularly as a form of transport to work, should be registered, so their bike has a registration number. At the moment if someone does knock down an old lady and rides off no one can trace that person.

Kate Hoey reportedly lives on Rathlin Island, an island off the coast of County Antrim in Northern Ireland, where she grew up and now owns a cottage.

== Government and parliamentary positions ==
- Member of Parliament for Vauxhall (1989–2019)
- Opposition Spokesperson, Citizen's Charter and Women (1992–1993)
- Parliamentary private secretary to Frank Field as Minister of State for Welfare Reform, Department of Social Security (1997–1998)
- Parliamentary Under-Secretary of State for the Home Office (1998–1999)
- Parliamentary Under-Secretary of State for, Department of Culture, Media and Sport (Minister for Sport) (1999–2001)
- Chair of the Northern Ireland Affairs Select Committee (2019)
- Member of the House of Lords (2020–present)
- Prime Ministerial Trade Envoy to Ghana (2021–present)

Additionally, Hoey was a member of several select committees during her time as a Member of Parliament, including: the European Scrutiny Committee, the Northern Ireland Affairs Committee, the Public Administration Committee, the Social Security Committee and the Science and Technology Committee.

== In popular culture ==
Hoey's role on the Public Administration and Constitutional Affairs Select Committee was dramatised in the 2017 verbatim musical Committee: (A New Musical), which retold the downfall of the charity Kids Company and which was first performed at the Donmar Warehouse. Hoey was portrayed by actor Rosemary Ashe.

Parliament of the United Kingdom
Preceded by Stuart Holland	Member of Parliament for Vauxhall; 1989–2019	Succeeded by Florence Eshalomi
Political offices
Preceded by The Lord Williams of Mostyn	Parliamentary Under-Secretary of State for Home Affairs; 1998–1999	Succeeded by The Lord Bassam of Brighton
Preceded by Tony Banks	Minister for Sport; 1999–2001	Succeeded by Richard Caborn
Orders of precedence in the United Kingdom
Preceded by The Baroness Fox of Buckley	Ladies; Baroness Hoey	Followed by The Baroness Fleet
