= Dave Cook (politician) =

British communist activist (1941–1993)

David John Scott Cook (4 August 1941 – 25 February 1993) was a British communist activist and politician. He was also an avid rock climber and environmental advocate.

Born in Warrington, Cook grew up in Solihull. He was educated at Solihull School and St Catharine's College, Cambridge, where he studied history and joined the Communist Party of Great Britain (CPGB). He worked as a teacher in Leeds and was active in the Young Communist League (YCL), eventually moving to London to serve as National Student Organiser.

In 1974, Cook became the Party's national election agent. The following year he was appointed National Organiser of the CPGB. In this role, he defended the Eurocommunists who were looking to change the Party's doctrinal approach. He was also involved in organising All Party Rallies with performances that featured the likes of Scritti Politti and Shakin' Stevens. But by 1981, Cook's role had been circumscribed by opponents within the Party. He left to work at a children's support union, and also devoted time to the Campaign Against Racist Laws.

Cook returned to the CPGB in 1983 as national campaign organiser. He stood unsuccessfully in Vauxhall at the 1983 and 1987 general elections, losing his deposit on both occasions.

The CPGB dissolved in 1991, and Cook joined its successor, Democratic Left. In 1992, he was a founding member of the Green Socialist Network, which was one of the early organisations in the UK's Green Left movement.

A rock climber since his days at Solihull School, Cook wrote often about the subject and was concerned with the state of mountaineering literature. In a keynote address at an international mountaineering festival in 1987, he said that writing about climbing should emphasize the cultural context and ecosystem in which the climbing takes place. He also wanted to include writing by women climbers to end what he considered a male-dominated perspective.

On 25 February 1993, Dave Cook died of pneumonia at St. Thomas' Hospital. He had been unconscious for two weeks in intensive care following a bicycling accident earlier in the month in Turkey. He was 51 years old.

Party political offices
Preceded by Gordon McLennan	National Organiser of the Communist Party of Great Britain; 1975–1981	Succeeded by Ian McKay
