= Abena Oppong-Asare =

British politician (born 1983)

Abena Oppong-Asare MP
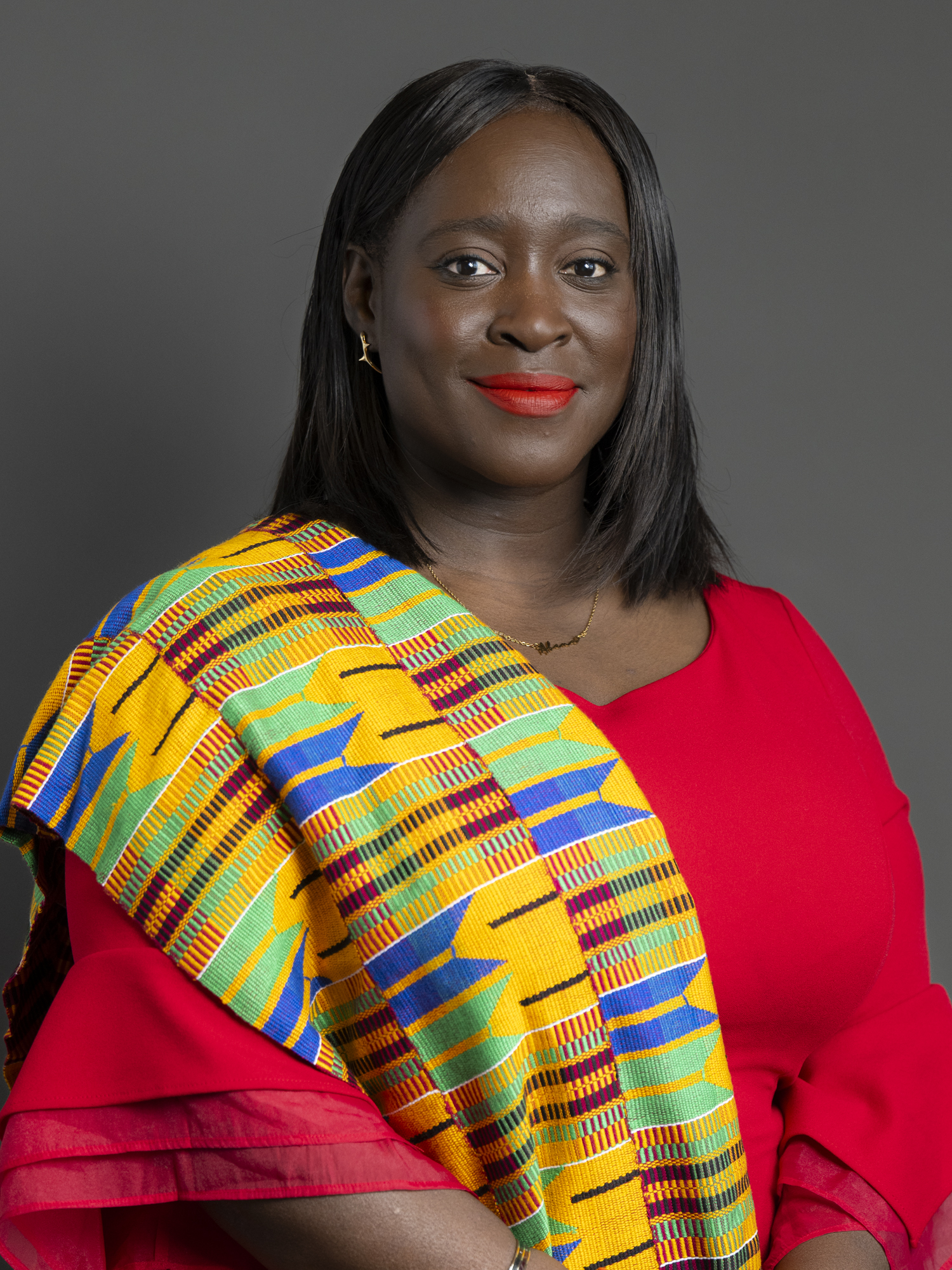
- Official portrait, 2024

Chair of the Housing, Communities and Local Government Committee
- Incumbent
- Assumed office 14 September 2026
- Preceded by: Florence Eshalomi

Parliamentary Private Secretary to the Prime Minister
- In office 11 September 2025 – 20 July 2026 Serving with Jon Pearce and Catherine Fookes
- Prime Minister: Keir Starmer
- Preceded by: Chris Ward; Liz Twist
- Succeeded by: David Baines; Jo Platt; Nic Dakin

Parliamentary Secretary for the Cabinet Office
- In office 9 July 2024 – 6 September 2025 Serving with Georgia Gould
- Prime Minister: Keir Starmer
- Preceded by: Alex Burghart
- Succeeded by: Chris Ward; Satvir Kaur

Member of Parliament for Erith and Thamesmead
- Incumbent
- Assumed office 12 December 2019
- Preceded by: Teresa Pearce
- Majority: 16,302 (40.4%)

Personal details
- Born: Abena Oppong-Asare; 8 February 1983 (age 43)
- Party: Labour
- Education: University of Kent (BA, MA)
- Occupation: Politician
- Website: Official website

Abena Oppong-Asare (born 8 February 1983) is a British Labour Party politician who has served as the Member of Parliament (MP) for Erith and Thamesmead since 2019. From 2025 to 2026, Oppong-Asare was Parliamentary Private Secretary to the Prime Minister, Keir Starmer. Since 2026, she has served as Chair of the Housing, Communities and Local Government Committee. Oppong-Asare and Bell Ribeiro-Addy, both elected in the 2019 general election, are the first female British Ghanaian MPs.

She was appointed to the Official Opposition frontbench in 2020, becoming Shadow Exchequer Secretary to the Treasury, and later Shadow Minister for Women's Health and Mental Health.

== Early life ==
Oppong-Asare is of Ghanaian descent and studied Politics with International Relations at the University of Kent, where she also attained a master's degree in International Law with International Relations. Since her election to Parliament she has maintained a working relationship with the University, which is attended by many of her constituents.

== Political career ==
Oppong-Asare was elected chair of the Labour Women's Network in 2019.

From 2014 to 2018, she was a Labour Party councillor for the Erith ward in Bexley London Borough Council, serving as deputy leader of the opposition Labour Party from 2014 to 2016 and acting as the spokesperson on education. She has also previously served as a parliamentary assistant and constituency liaison officer, and has advised the shadow minister for Preventing Violence Against Women and Girls. Prior to her election, Oppong-Asare worked at the Greater London Authority, supporting GLA members to effectively represent the people of London. During this time, she led community engagement following the Grenfell Tower fire.

In 2019, she was selected as Labour's prospective parliamentary candidate for Erith and Thamesmead after the incumbent MP, Teresa Pearce, announced she would be standing down at the next election. In the 2019 general election she was elected as the Member of Parliament (MP) for Erith and Thamesmead.

In 2020, she released a report entitled 'Leaving Nobody Behind in Erith and Thamesmead', examining the impact of the Pandemic on key groups in her constituency, including disabled people, people from ethnic minority backgrounds, women, young people and those from a lower socio-economic backgrounds. The report was widely praised upon publication and picked up by local and national media outlets.

On 14 January 2020 she was announced as the parliamentary private secretary to the new Shadow Secretary of State for Environment, Food and Rural Affairs, Luke Pollard.

On 16 April 2020, Oppong-Asare was announced as the parliamentary private secretary to the newly appointed Shadow Chancellor of the Exchequer, Anneliese Dodds.

On 16 October 2020, Oppong-Asare was promoted to Shadow Exchequer Secretary to the Treasury, replacing Wes Streeting, who was moved to the position of Shadow Minister for Schools following resignations the previous day relating to the Covert Human Intelligence Sources (Criminal Conduct) Bill.

In November 2021, the political monitoring organisation Vuelio identified Oppong-Asare as amongst the top three newly elected MPs who tabled the most Parliamentary Questions that session. In June 2021, PR firm Edelman included her in their list of "ones to watch" from the 2019 intake. In 2022, Oppong-Asare was included in the 'Women in Westminster: The 100' list to mark International Women's Day.

Each year, Oppong-Asare holds a political and campaigning summer school for local young people in which she invites high-profile speakers to deliver training and workshops designed to encourage political engagement from those who are often under-represented.

In the 2023 British shadow cabinet reshuffle she was appointed Shadow Minister for Women's Health and Mental Health.

Following the 2024 general election, she was appointed as Parliamentary Secretary for the Cabinet Office, where she served from July 2024 to September 2025. She led on national security and resilience, as well as cross-departmental delivery alongside the then Chancellor of the Duchy of Lancaster, Pat McFadden.

In September 2025, Oppong-Asare was appointed Parliamentary Private Secretary to the Prime Minister. She stepped down from this post following Keir Starmer's resignation as Prime Minister in July 2026, but was elected chair of the House of Commons Housing, Communities and Local Government Select Committee in September 2026.

Oppong-Asare is a member of the Fabian Society and of the Labour Women's Network, of which she is a Patron. Locally, she is Club Patron of Erith Town Football Club.

Parliament of the United Kingdom
Preceded by Teresa Pearce	Member of Parliament for Erith and Thamesmead; 2019–present	Incumbent
