= Stuart Holland =

British economist and politician (1940–2026)

Shadow Minister for Overseas Development
- In office 31 October 1983 – 13 July 1987
- Leader: Neil Kinnock
- Preceded by: Guy Barnett

Member of Parliament for Vauxhall
- In office 3 May 1979 – 18 May 1989
- Preceded by: George Strauss
- Succeeded by: Kate Hoey

Personal details
- Born: 25 March 1940 Manchester, England
- Died: 5 November 2026 (aged 86)
- Party: Labour
- Education: University of Oxford

Stuart Kingsley Holland (25 March 1940 – 5 November 2026) was a British economist and politician. As a Member of Parliament for the Labour Party, Holland represented the Vauxhall constituency in Lambeth, London, from 1979 to 1989, when he resigned his seat to take up a post at the European University Institute in Florence.

Holland held teaching and research posts at the Universities of Oxford and of Sussex, the European University Institute, and the Universities of Roskilde and of Coimbra. He authored over 180 articles (many of which are in referred journals, chapters in books and other papers and conference presentations) and authored, co-authored or edited over 15 books on economic theory and policy, international trade, economic integration, regional theory and policy, social policies, development economics and global governance. Holland was a visiting professor at the Faculty of Economics of the University of Coimbra and a Senior Scholar of the Institute of Social and European Studies, Köszeg, Hungary.

== Life and career ==
Born in Manchester, England on 25 March 1940, Holland studied and taught history and political theory at the University of Oxford, became an adviser to Harold Wilson on European affairs and gained the consent of Charles de Gaulle for a second British application to join the European Community.

Resigning from 10 Downing Street when Wilson did not follow through with the proposal for a European Technology Community and for mutual currency support, Holland gained an economics doctorate at Oxford and drafted what in the early 1970s became the economic programme of the British Labour Party when he researched and taught at Sussex University.

His case for state holding companies in energy and industry led to the creation of the British National Oil Corporation and a National Enterprise Board. His proposals for regional development agencies led to the creation of the Scottish, Welsh and Northern Ireland Development Agencies and the Greater London Enterprise Board (now London Enterprise).

From 1979 to 1989, he was Labour Member of Parliament for Vauxhall. As shadow minister for development co-operation from 1983 to 1987, he drafted the 1985 Global Challenge report for the Socialist International and led the first Labour Party delegation to China since Clement Attlee in 1952. He then was shadow financial secretary to the Treasury before he left Westminster to help Jacques Delors shape European Union policies for economic and social cohesion.

MPs resign from the House of Commons by being appointed to an office of profit under the Crown. Holland was appointed to the sinecure post of Steward of the Chiltern Hundreds and held it for five years and 247 days, the longest time that the post has been held since its creation in 1850.

Holland's proposals to Delors for bonds like during the US New Deal to offset the deflationary Maastricht debt and deficit conditions resurfaced during the eurozone crisis. His case to Delors on the case for a New Bretton Woods Conference was endorsed by Bill Clinton at his first G7 in Naples but was not followed through by European governments.

His later case that the G20 should constitute the governing body of a World Development Organization also attracted high-level interest from the Permanent Representatives to the UN of China, Japan, India, South Africa, Brazil and Mexico.

His earlier advice to Andreas Papandreou, backed by François Mitterrand, prompted the first revision of the Treaty of Rome with commitments to an internal market and to economic and social cohesion in the 1986 Single European Act.

His later advice to Portuguese Prime Minister António Guterres included a cohesion and convergence remit for the European Investment Bank to invest in health, education, urban regeneration and new technology without counting on national debt. In 199?, the European Council endorsed the proposal, as did employer and trades union representatives on the Economic and Social Committee of the EU in 2012.

In 2010, he co-authored A Modest Proposal with the Greek economist Yanis Varoufakis.

Holland died on 5 November 2026, at the age of 86. His death was announced on the same day.

== Bibliography ==
- The State as Entrepreneur, New Dimensions for Public Enterprise: The IRI State Shareholding Formula (1972) editor
- Socialist Challenge (1975)
- Capital versus the Regions (1976)
- The Regional Problem (1976)
- Beyond Capitalist Planning (1978) editor
- Uncommon Market: Capital, Class and Power in the European Community (1980)
- Out of Crisis. A Project for European Recovery (1983) editor
- Kissinger's Kingdom: a Counter Report on Central America (1984) with Donald Anderson
- Never Kneel Down: Drought, Development and Liberation in Eritrea (1984) with James Firebrace
- The Market Economy: From Micro to Mesoeconomics (1987)
- The Global Economy: From Micro to Mesoeconomics (1987)
- Central America: The Future of Economic Integration (1989) editor with George Irvin
- The European Imperative: Economic and Social Cohesion in the 1990s (1993)
- Towards a New Bretton Woods: Alternatives for the Global Economy (1994)
- A Modest Proposal (2010) with Yanis Varoufakis
- Europe in Question: And What to Do About it (2014)

== Notes ==
Parliament of the United Kingdom
Preceded by George Strauss	Member of Parliament for Vauxhall; 1979–1989	Succeeded by Kate Hoey
