= 1989 Vauxhall by-election =

By-election in the constituency of Vauxhall

- 15 June 1989

Constituency of Vauxhall
- Turnout: 44.4% (▼19.6%)
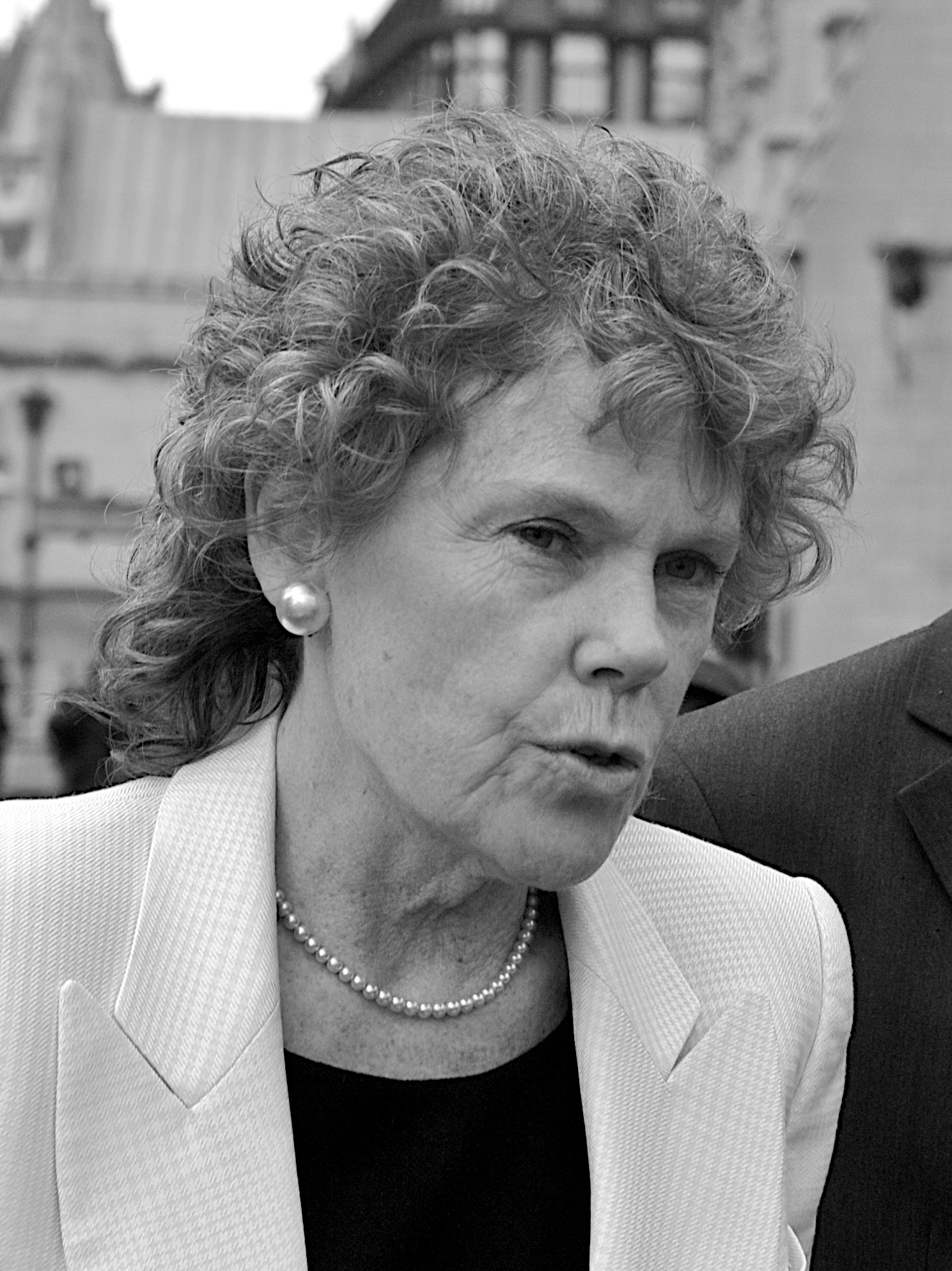

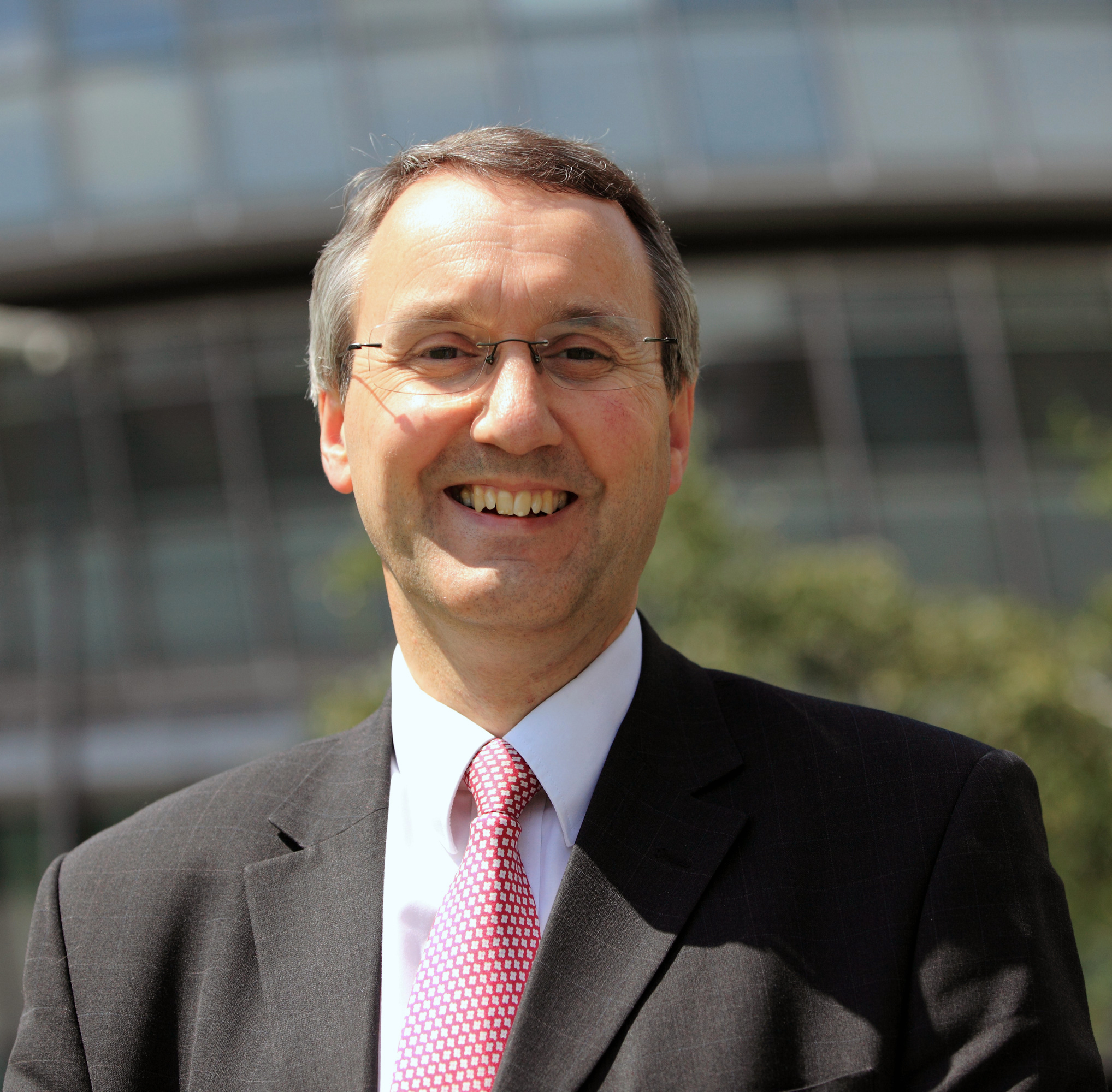
	First party	Second party
		Con
Candidate	Kate Hoey	Michael Keegan
Party	Labour	Conservative
Popular vote	15,191	5,425
Percentage	52.7%	18.8%
Swing	▲2.5%	▼10.2%
	Third party	Fourth party
		Green
Candidate	Mike Tuffrey	Henry Bewley
Party	SLD	Green
Popular vote	5,043	1,767
Percentage	17.5%	6.1%
Swing	▼0.7%	▲4.3%
MP before election
Stuart Holland
Labour
Subsequent MP
Kate Hoey
Labour

A by-election for the United Kingdom House of Commons was held in the constituency of Vauxhall on 15 June 1989, following the resignation of sitting Member of Parliament (MP) Stuart Holland.

The winner, Kate Hoey, was Minister for Sport in Tony Blair's Labour government from 1999 to 2001 before returning to the backbenches.

The 1989 by-election was caused by Stuart Holland's resignation to take up an academic job in preference to remaining in the Labour Party. There was controversy surrounding the Labour candidate selection process. Martha Osamor had the most nominations, with Hoey only having one, but the National Executive Committee declined to shortlist Osamor and imposed a shortlist on the constituency party. When the local party refused to choose from the shortlist, Hoey was imposed by the NEC as the Labour candidate.

== Candidates ==
The by-election was contested by 14 candidates: one of the longest lists of serious candidates at any by-election in the 1980s. Don Milligan stood as the candidate of the Revolutionary Communist Party and made the struggle for gay equality the centrepiece of his campaign. Rev Hewie Andrew stood as "The People's Candidate", out of protest at the Labour Party's selection process for their candidate. There were two "Green" candidates: Henry Bewley (who represented the Green Party officially, and Dominic Allen (sponsored by a religious cult) who used the title "The Greens". This was the first time the Green Party saved its deposit in a UK Parliamentary election. There were two National Front candidates, from their warring "Official" and "Flag" factions.

At close of nominations, there had been 15 contenders, with rival candidates for the 'Social & Liberal Democrats' and 'Continuing Social Democratic Party'. However, the SDP candidate, Tom Edwards, withdrew his candidature before the notice of poll.

== Result ==
Vauxhall by-election, 1989
Party	Candidate	Votes	%	±%
Labour	Kate Hoey	15,191	52.7	+2.5
Conservative	Michael Keegan	5,425	18.8	−10.2
SLD	Mike Tuffrey	5,043	17.5	−0.7
Green	Henry Bewley	1,767	6.1	+4.3
The People's Candidate	Hewie Andrew	302	1.1	New
The Greens	Dominic Allen	264	0.9	New
Independent	Rudy Narayan	179	0.6	New
Revolutionary Communist	Don Milligan	177	0.6	New
Official National Front	Patrick Harrington	127	0.4	New
Monster Raving Loony	Screaming Lord Sutch	106	0.4	New
Christian Alliance	David Black	86	0.3	New
National Front	Ted Budden	83	0.3	New
Fellowship	Geoffrey Rolph	24	0.1	New
Leveller Party	William Scola	21	0.1	New
Majority		9,766	33.9	+12.7
Turnout		28,795	44.4	−19.6
Registered electors		64,905		
Labour hold		Swing		

== See also ==
- Lists of United Kingdom by-elections
