= Teresa Pearce =

British Labour politician (born 1955)

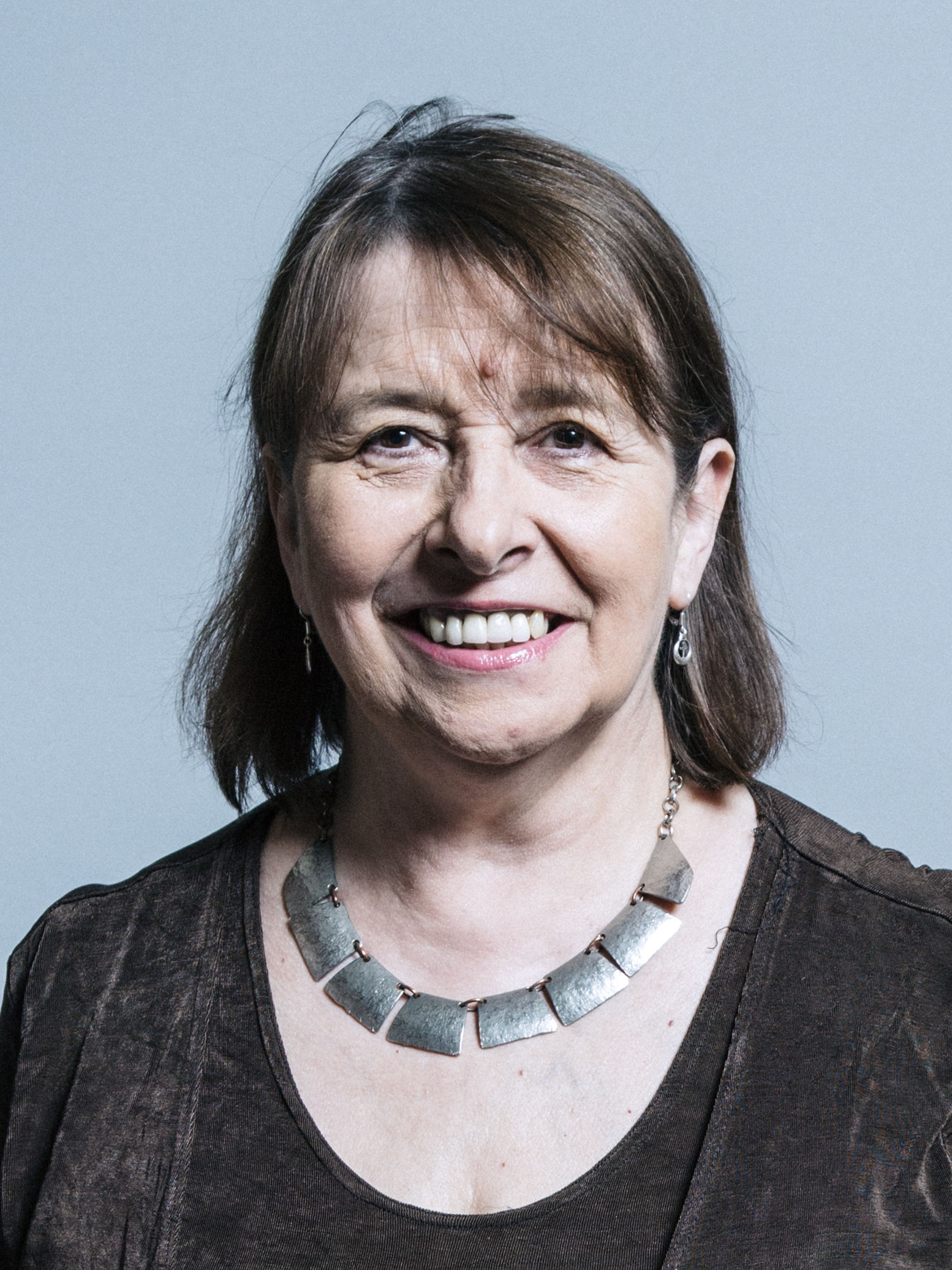
- Official portrait, 2017

Shadow Secretary of State for Communities and Local Government
- In office 7 October 2016 – 14 June 2017
- Leader: Jeremy Corbyn
- Preceded by: Grahame Morris
- Succeeded by: Andrew Gwynne

Member of Parliament for Erith and Thamesmead
- In office 6 May 2010 – 6 November 2019
- Preceded by: John Austin
- Succeeded by: Abena Oppong-Asare

Personal details
- Born: 1 February 1955 (age 71) Southport, Lancashire, England
- Party: Labour
- Spouse: Paul O'Neill
- Website: teresapearce.org.uk

Teresa Pearce (born 1 February 1955) is a British Labour Party politician who was the Member of Parliament (MP) for Erith and Thamesmead from 2010 to 2019, who was appointed as a Shadow Minister for Housing and Planning in September 2015. In the reshuffle of October 2016, Pearce was appointed as acting Shadow Secretary of State for Communities and Local Government, standing down after the 2017 general election to concentrate on her constituency.

== Early life ==
Teresa Pearce was born in Southport, Lancashire, but was educated at the St Thomas More School in Eltham, London. For ten years prior to her election, she was a senior manager with PricewaterhouseCoopers. She is a former Bexley councillor.

== Parliamentary career ==
Pearce was elected to the House of Commons as Member of Parliament for Erith and Thamesmead in the 2010 general election with a majority of 5,703. In her maiden speech she stated her pride in the Labour Party's track record on Sure Start, the future jobs fund and the national minimum wage.

In 2015, she was re-elected with an increased majority of 9,525, gaining just under 50% of the vote.

In Parliament, Pearce served on a number of Select Committees between 2010 and 2015, sitting on both the Work and Pensions Select Committee (2010–2015) and the Treasury Select Committee (2011–2015). Pearce also shortly served on the Public Accounts Committee (2015) before she was appointed to serve as Shadow Minister for Housing and Planning in September 2015. She was appointed as the Shadow Secretary of State for Communities and Local Government in the October 2016 reshuffle, but it was announced she intends to stand down from the post after the May 2017 local elections.

She supported Owen Smith in the failed attempt to replace Jeremy Corbyn in the 2016 Labour Party (UK) leadership election.

Pearce was re-elected in the general election 2017, with an increased majority of 10,014, gaining over 57% of the vote.

In July 2019, Pearce announced that she would stand down at the next general election.

== Personal life ==
Pearce has two adult daughters and two step-children. She had her first daughter when she was 18 and said she knows from experience what it is like to be "written off" as a teenage mother. She has 7 grandchildren: Olivia, Bella, Charlotte, Daniel, Erin, Millie and Ruby. She now lives in Canterbury and retrained in 2021 as a Humanist celebrant.

Parliament of the United Kingdom
Preceded by John Austin	Member of Parliament for Erith and Thamesmead; 2010–2019	Succeeded by Abena Oppong-Asare
Political offices
Preceded by Grahame Morris	Shadow Secretary of State for Communities and Local Government; 2016–2017	Succeeded by Roberta Blackman-Woods
Preceded by Grahame Morris	Shadow Minister for the Constitutional Convention; 2016–2017	Succeeded by Roberta Blackman-Woods
