= Kate Osamor =

British Labour Co-op politician (born 1968)

Kate Osamor MP
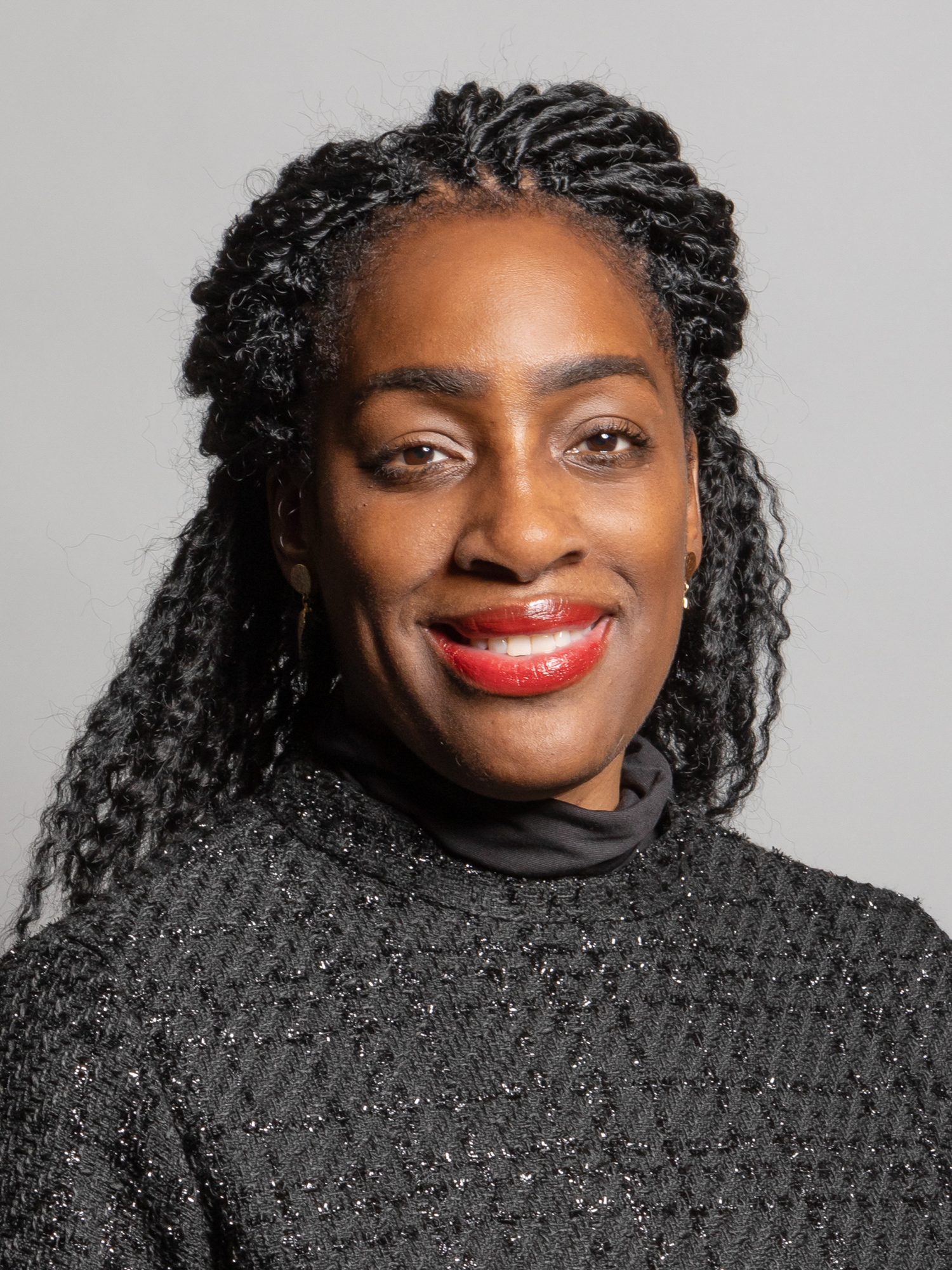
- Official portrait, 2020

Shadow Secretary of State for International Development
- In office 27 June 2016 – 1 December 2018
- Leader: Jeremy Corbyn
- Preceded by: Diane Abbott
- Succeeded by: Dan Carden

Shadow Minister for Women and Equalities
- In office 14 January 2016 – 27 June 2016
- Leader: Jeremy Corbyn
- Preceded by: Position established
- Succeeded by: Carolyn Harris

Parliamentary Private Secretary to the Leader of the Opposition
- In office 12 September 2015 – 14 January 2016 Serving with Steve Rotheram
- Leader: Jeremy Corbyn
- Preceded by: Karen Buck; Wayne David
- Succeeded by: Position abolished

Member of Parliament for Edmonton and Winchmore Hill Edmonton (2015–2024)
- Incumbent
- Assumed office 7 May 2015
- Preceded by: Andy Love
- Majority: 12,632 (30.8%)

Personal details
- Born: Ofunne Kate Osamor; 15 August 1968 (age 58) London, England, UK
- Party: Labour Co-operative
- Domestic partner: Kim Udi (separated)
- Children: 1
- Parent: Martha Osamor (mother)
- Education: New City College; University of East London (BA)
- Website: Official website

Ofunne Kate Osamor (/oʊˈsæmɔːr/; born 15 August 1968) is a British Labour and Co-operative politician who has been Member of Parliament (MP) for Edmonton and Winchmore Hill, previously Edmonton, since 2015. She was Shadow Secretary of State for International Development from 2016 to 2018. She is a member of the Socialist Campaign Group parliamentary caucus, and currently serves as the Government's Trade Envoy to East Africa.

== Early life and career ==
Ofunne Kate Osamor was born on 15 August 1968 in North London and grew up in Haringey. She was one of four children; her father died when she was a child and her mother, politician Martha Osamor (née Oburotha), had to work "three, sometimes four jobs".

Osamor was educated at Creighton Comprehensive School in Muswell Hill from 1979 to 1983. She completed an access course at Hackney College from 2003 to 2006, and subsequently read Third World Studies at the University of East London. Osamor was diagnosed with dyslexia at university, to which she attributes some of her difficulties at school.

She worked for The Big Issue newspaper after graduating, but principally worked in the NHS and was active in Unite the Union. Osamor was an executive assistant in a general practitioner (GP) out-of-hours service for 9 years and a GP practice manager for 2 years.

In 2014, Osamor was elected a member of the National Executive Committee of the Labour Party.

== Political career ==
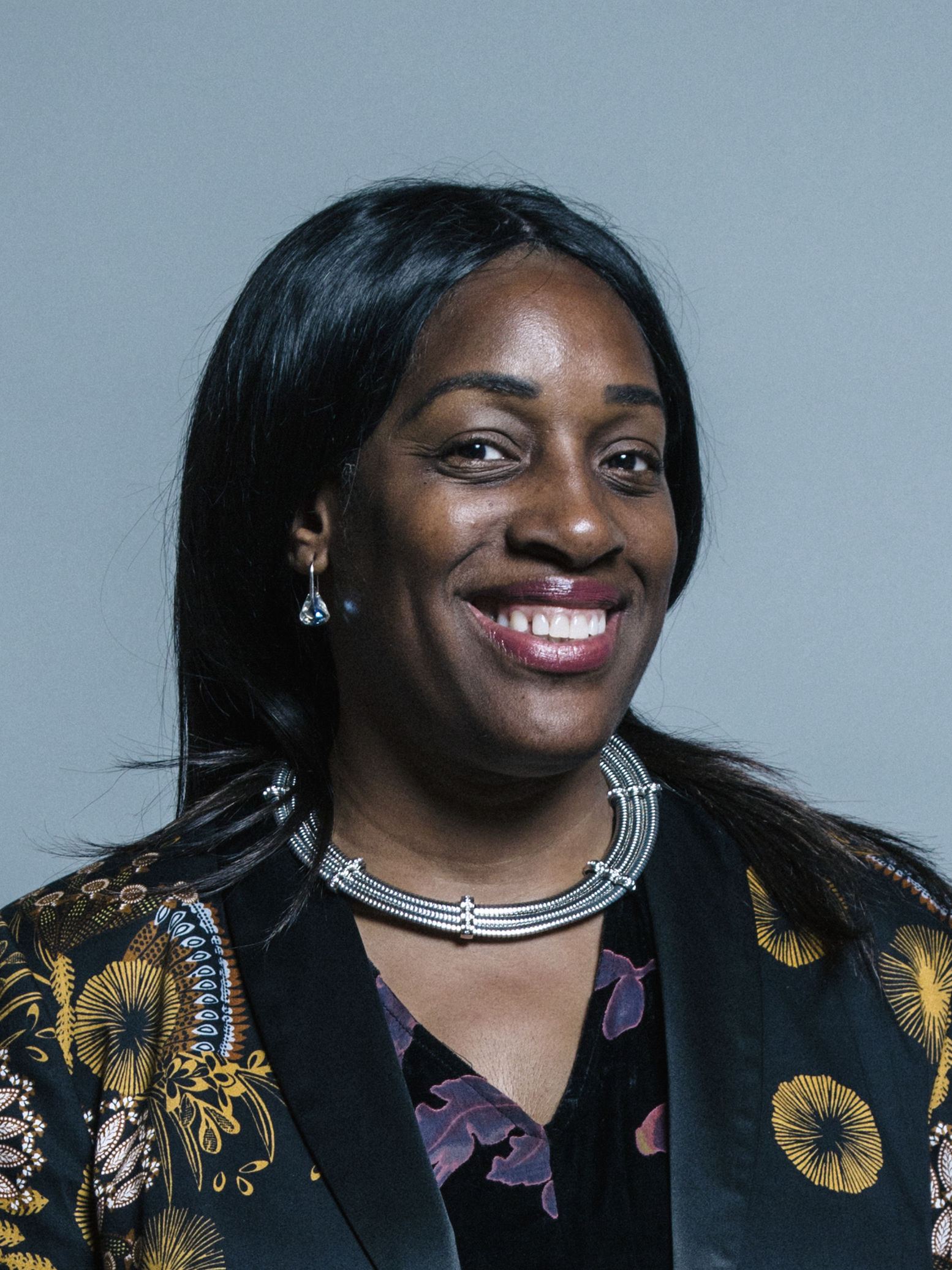
Osamor in 2017

=== 1st parliament (2015–2017) ===
At the 2015 general election, Osamor was elected to Parliament as MP for Edmonton with 61.4% of the vote and a majority of 15,419.

Osamor was one of 36 Labour MPs to nominate Jeremy Corbyn as a candidate in the Labour leadership election of 2015. She was appointed as a Parliamentary Private Secretary to Corbyn in September 2015.

On 14 January 2016, Osamor was appointed to the Opposition frontbench as Shadow Minister for Women and Equalities.

Also in January 2016, Osamor was accused of hypocrisy for advertising an unpaid internship which paid expenses only. Osamor subsequently withdrew the advert, stating it had been a "misunderstanding".

On 27 June 2016, following the resignations of numerous members of Labour's ministerial team due to disquiet over the leadership of Jeremy Corbyn, Osamor was appointed Shadow Secretary of State for International Development.

Osamor has served as the chair for the All Party Parliamentary Group for Nigeria since 2015.

=== 2nd term (2017–2019) ===
At the snap 2017 general election, Osamor was re-elected as MP for Edmonton with an increased vote share of 71.5% and an increased majority of 21,115. After her re-election, she was accused of plagiarising sections of her victory address from Barack Obama's 2008 speech. According to Osamor, she "deliberately invoked a victory speech so famous that she thought it needed no introduction".

In her role as Shadow International Development Secretary, Osamor in December 2018 advocated an increase in aid funding for women's groups, and argued that international aid should be targeted towards schemes which aimed to reduce inequality, as well as schemes aimed at poverty reduction.

On 29 August 2019, she warned that the monarchy could be abolished, following Queen Elizabeth II approving Prime Minister Boris Johnson's plan to suspend Parliament.

==== Parliamentary standards investigation ====
In October 2018, it was reported that Osamor continued to employ her son, Ishmael, in her Parliamentary office despite his drug-related convictions. The Labour Party initially said that Osamor, who also lives with her son, knew nothing about his case until sentencing on 26 October. However, it later emerged that she had written to the trial judge asking for leniency before his sentencing on 19 October. She faced further criticism when it was revealed that she used parliamentary stationery and referenced her shadow cabinet position in writing to the judge.

Upon being doorstepped by reporter from The Times about the issue, Osamor threw a bucket of water, shouted profanities, and said "I should have come down here with a...bat and smashed your face open". Osamor was first referred to the Parliamentary Commissioner for Standards in November 2018, by a Conservative MP, and the investigation was expanded following the incident with the journalist. She denied any wrongdoing, and called the initial referral "politically motivated".

Osamor resigned from the Shadow Cabinet on 1 December 2018, stating she needed "to concentrate on supporting my family through the difficult time we have been experiencing". She later tweeted that she was "deeply sorry for (her) emotional outbursts and ... working to better manage (her) feelings".

On 19 March 2020, the Standards Commissioner found Osamor guilty of two breaches of Parliamentary rules. The first breach was the use of House of Commons paper for her son's reference, and the second was the abusing and assaulting the journalist. She was ordered to produce a written apology for her actions. Osamor accepted that she broke the rules and apologised to the Commissioner, although she later commented that she was "the target of a witch-hunt, and that race and class were factors".

As of 2023, Ishmael remains Chief of Staff in his mother’s parliamentary office. A ban on MPs employing family members and other ‘Connected Parties’ came in to effect after the 2020 general election; however, it was not applied to existing employees.

=== 3rd term (2019–2024) ===
In October 2019, local party members voted for Osamor to face a re-selection contest to stand at the next general election. However, the contest was scrapped when the 2019 general election was called. At the general election, Osamor was again re-elected, with a decreased vote share of 65% and a decreased majority of 16,015.

In January 2022, Osamor and four other Labour delegates to the Parliamentary Assembly of the Council of Europe tabled ten amendments to a resolution on "Combating rising hate against LGBTI people". The amendments sought to include the word "sex" alongside gender identity, de-conflate the situation in the UK from Hungary, Poland, Russia and Turkey, and remove references to alleged anti-LGBTI movements in the UK. The delegates received both praise and criticism.

On 28 January 2024, Osamor had the Labour Party parliamentary whip withdrawn pending an investigation into comments she made about Holocaust Memorial Day in her weekly newsletter. She wrote that there was an "international duty" to remember the victims of the Holocaust and that "more recent genocides in Cambodia, Rwanda, Bosnia and now Gaza" should also be remembered. On 8 May 2024, the Labour whip was restored to her.

=== 4th term (2024–) ===
Due to the 2023 review of Westminster constituencies, Osamor's constituency of Edmonton was abolished, and replaced with Edmonton and Winchmore Hill. At the 2024 general election, Osamor was elected to Parliament as MP for Edmonton and Winchmore Hill with 50% of the vote and a majority of 12,632.

== Personal life ==
She had a son in 1989, Ishmael Osamor (born Ishmael Udi), with her then partner Kim Udi. Ishmael served as a Councillor and Cabinet Member on Haringey Council. He resigned from his position at Haringey Council after his criminal conviction in 2018.

Her mother, Martha, is a Labour activist and politician who served as a Councillor and Deputy Leader of Haringey Council. She was appointed to the House of Lords in 2018, on the recommendation of Jeremy Corbyn.

Parliament of the United Kingdom
Preceded by Andy Love	Member of Parliament for Edmonton; 2015–present	Incumbent
Political offices
Preceded by Diane Abbott	Shadow Secretary of State for International Development; 2016–2018	Succeeded by Dan Carden (Acting)
