= Vauxhall and Camberwell Green =

UK Parliament constituency (since 2024)

- Borough constituency for the House of Commons
- Boundary of Vauxhall and Camberwell Green in Greater London
- County: Greater London
- Electorate: 69,995 (March 2020)
- Major settlements: Vauxhall, Camberwell Green, Newington

Current constituency
- Created: 2024
- Member of Parliament: Florence Eshalomi (Labour)
- Seats: One
- Created from: Vauxhall, Bermondsey and Old Southwark, Camberwell and Peckham

Vauxhall and Camberwell Green is a constituency in Greater London represented in the House of Commons of the UK Parliament. Following the completion of the 2023 Periodic Review of Westminster constituencies, it was first contested at the 2024 general election, and Florence Eshalomi (MP for the predecessor constituency of Vauxhall 2019-2024) was elected for the Labour Party.

== Constituency profile ==
Lambeth and Vauxhall

Vauxhall and Camberwell Green is a constituency in Greater London in England, mostly within the Borough of Lambeth and partly within the Borough of Southwark. It covers the areas of Vauxhall, Lambeth, Waterloo, Kennington, Oval and part of Camberwell.

This is a dense, urban constituency in Central London on the opposite bank of the River Thames from Westminster. Vauxhall and Lambeth were previously centres for light industry and manufacturing which have since been redeveloped with many expensive, high-rise apartments along the river. Kennington and Camberwell are more deprived; this area was mostly developed during the Victorian era and many of the large, suburban houses have been divided up into flats. Nearly half of residents in these areas live in social housing. Waterloo contains some of London's popular landmarks including the Southbank Centre and the London Eye. House prices across the constituency are generally higher than the rest of London, and the average price is more than double the UK average.

Vauxhall and Camberwell Green has a very young population, with high proportions of students and young adults and few retirees; several higher education institutions have campuses and student accommodation within the constituency, including London South Bank University, King’s College London and University College London. Like most of Inner London, residents have high rates of income and very low levels of homeownership compared to the rest of the country. The child poverty rate is above-average. Residents are very well-educated and a high proportion work in the health, information and arts sectors. The percentage claiming unemployment benefits is high.

Vauxhall and Camberwell Green is an ethnically-diverse constituency. White people made up 49% of the population at the 2021 census, around one-third of whom were of non-British origin including large Portuguese and Spanish communities. Black people were the largest ethnic minority group at 28%, including many people of Jamaican and Nigerian origin. Asians were 9% of the population and 8% were mixed race.

At the local borough council level, most of this constituency is represented by the Labour Party, although some Green Party and Liberal Democrat councillors were also elected. Voters in Vauxhall and Camberwell Green overwhelmingly supported remaining in the European Union in the 2016 referendum; an estimated 75% voted to remain compared to the UK-wide figure of 48%, one of the top 20 highest remain votes out of 650 constituencies nationwide according to Electoral Calculus.

== Boundaries ==
Map of boundaries from 2024

The constituency is defined as comprising the following wards as they existed on 1 December 2020:

- The London Borough of Lambeth wards of: Bishop’s; Oval; Prince’s; Stockwell; Vassall.
- The London Borough of Southwark wards of: Camberwell Green; Newington.

It covers the following areas:

- The majority of the abolished constituency of Vauxhall, comprising the Borough of Lambeth areas of Kennington, Myatt's Fields, Stockwell, Vauxhall, Waterloo and South Bank.
- The Borough of Southwark districts of Newington from Bermondsey and Old Southwark, and Camberwell Green from Camberwell and Peckham.

Following a local government boundary review in the Borough of Lambeth which came into effect in May 2022, the constituency now comprises the following from the 2024 general election:

- The London Borough of Lambeth wards of: Kennington; Myatt's Fields; Oval; Stockwell East (majority); Stockwell West & Larkhall (majority); Vauxhall; Waterloo & South Bank.
- The London Borough of Southwark wards of: Camberwell Green; Newington.

== Members of Parliament ==
Vauxhall, Bermondsey and Old Southwark and Camberwell and Peckham prior to 2024

Election	Member	Party
2024	Florence Eshalomi	Labour Co-op

== Elections ==
=== Elections in the 2020s ===
General election 2024: Vauxhall and Camberwell Green
Party	Candidate	Votes	%	±%
Labour Co-op	Florence Eshalomi	21,528	57.4	▼3.1
Green	Catherine Dawkins	6,416	17.1	▲13.0
Liberal Democrats	Chris French	4,549	12.1	▼7.0
Conservative	Aarti Joshi	2,809	7.5	▼7.0
Reform	Mike King	2,033	5,4	▲3.8
SDP	Andrew McRobbie	201	0.5	N/A
Majority		15,112	40.3	▼1.1
Turnout		37,536	53.9	▼12.4
Registered electors		69,658		
Labour hold		Swing	▼8.1	

=== Elections in the 2010s ===
2019 notional result
Party	Vote	%
Labour	28,073	60.5
Liberal Democrats	8,848	19.1
Conservative	6,746	14.5
Green	1,915	4.1
Brexit Party	722	1.6
Others	136	0.3
Turnout	46,440	66.3
Electorate	69,995	
