= Vauxhall (UK Parliament constituency) =

Parliamentary constituency in the United Kingdom, 1950-2024

Coordinates: 51.482°N 0.119°W

- Former borough constituency for the House of Commons
- Boundary of Vauxhall in Greater London
- County: Greater London
- Electorate: 88,659 (December 2019)
- Major settlements: North Lambeth, Vauxhall, Stockwell, Kennington, Clapham, Brixton (part)

1950–2024
- Seats: One
- Created from: Kennington and Lambeth North
- Replaced by: Clapham and Brixton Hill, Vauxhall and Camberwell Green

Vauxhall was a constituency (Note: A borough constituency (for the purposes of election expenses and type of returning officer)) in London. It was represented in the House of Commons of the UK Parliament by members of the Labour Party for the whole of its creation from 1950 until its abolition for the 2024 general election.

Under the 2023 review of Westminster constituencies, the majority of the constituency was incorporated into the new seat of Vauxhall and Camberwell Green, with the wards of Clapham Town, Ferndale and Larkhall being included in the new constituency of Clapham and Brixton Hill.

== Boundaries ==
Map of boundaries 2010–2024

1950–1974: The Metropolitan Borough of Lambeth wards of Bishop's, Marsh, Oval, Prince's, and Vauxhall.

1974–1983: The London Borough of Lambeth wards of Bishop's, Oval, Prince's, Stockwell, and Vassall.

1983–1997: The London Borough of Lambeth wards of Bishop's, Clapham Town, Ferndale, Larkhall, Oval, Prince's, Stockwell, and Vassall.

1997–2010: The London Borough of Lambeth wards of Angell, Bishop's, Clapham Town, Ferndale, Larkhall, Oval, Prince's, Stockwell, and Vassall.

2010–2024: The London Borough of Lambeth wards of Bishop's, Clapham Town, Ferndale, Larkhall, Oval, Prince's, Stockwell, and Vassall.

Vauxhall was wholly within the London Borough of Lambeth. The core of the constituency, unchanged from the former Lambeth North, was delimited by the River Thames to the west and north and the boundary with Southwark to the east.

== Constituency profile ==
The seat included all of Vauxhall, North Lambeth, Stockwell, Kennington and some of Brixton and north Clapham. Its landmarks included the London Eye, The Oval cricket ground, Royal Vauxhall Tavern, SIS building and the National Theatre. Among Britain's most ethnically diverse constituencies, Vauxhall had sizable Jamaican, Portuguese, Ghanaian and Ecuadorian communities.

At just over 6% of the population, Vauxhall (which was located in the London Borough of Lambeth) had the largest proportion of LGBT+ people in the country as of 2016.

== Political history ==
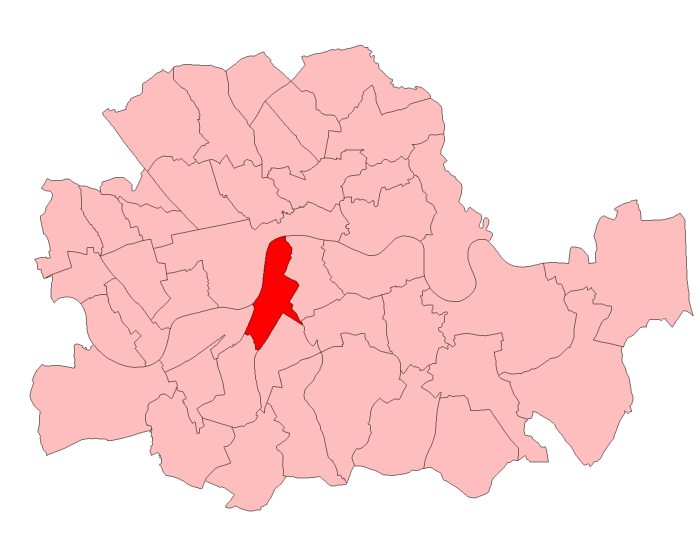
Vauxhall in the Parliamentary County of London from 1950 to 1974

The area has consistently voted in parliamentary elections for Labour Members of Parliament since 1929, except in 1931. This includes the results of the former seat of Lambeth North, which had near-identical boundaries.

Since a 1989 by-election, the seat had been represented by Kate Hoey. Continuing a history as a safe seat for Labour, since her 1989 election, Hoey consistently achieved majorities of 9,100 to 20,200 votes. The 2015 result made the seat the 105th safest of Labour's 232 seats by percentage of majority.

Despite Hoey being a prominent campaigner for leaving the European Union, Vauxhall voted to remain in the EU by 77.6% in the national referendum on 23 June 2016. This made it the strongest pro-EU constituency to be represented by a pro-Brexit MP. In the 2017 general election, this led to her seat being targeted by pro-Remain organisations and high-profile individuals seeking to oust her in favour of the pro-EU Liberal Democrat candidate. There had been a change.org petition calling for Hoey's deselection as the Labour candidate for the seat; however, due to party rules this was unsuccessful. In the 2017 election, Hoey significantly increased her majority to the largest the seat had ever seen; the Liberal Democrat vote total more than trebled, and they moved back into second place having fallen to fourth behind the Conservatives and the Greens in 2015. In May 2018, Hoey's local party passed a vote of no confidence in her, vowing to deselect the MP as well. On 8 July 2019 Hoey announced that she would retire from the House of Commons, and would not seek re-election as a Labour candidate at the next general election.

=== Prominent frontbenchers ===
George Strauss was appointed Minister of Supply from 1947 to 1951 during the Attlee Ministry. Kate Hoey was Minister for Sport (1999–2001) during the Blair Ministry.

=== Local government results ===
The constituency shared boundaries with the Vauxhall electoral division for election of councillors to the Greater London Council at elections in 1973, 1977 and 1981.

The local government wards in the constituency are currently entirely represented by Labour on Lambeth London Borough Council.

A single Conservative councillor represented the Clapham Town ward from 2002 until losing their seat by sixty votes in the 2006 Council Elections.

Three Liberal Democrat councillors represented the Bishop's ward from 1990 to 2014; they subsequently lost the three ward seats to Labour, as did the sole Liberal Democrat councilors in the Oval and Vassall wards. They failed to gain them back in 2018.

At the 2018 council elections, Labour won all of the ward seats in the constituency. The Liberal Democrats finished second in the wards of Bishop's, Oval, Stockwell and Prince's. The Conservatives finished the runner up in Clapham Town and the Green Party in Vassall, Ferndale and Larkhall.

== Members of Parliament ==
| Election | Member | Party |
|---|---|---|
| 1950 | George Strauss | Labour |
| 1979 | Stuart Holland | Labour |
| 1989 by-election | Kate Hoey | Labour |
| 2019 | Florence Eshalomi | Labour Co-op |

== Elections ==
=== Elections in the 2010s ===
General election 2019: Vauxhall
| Party | Candidate | Votes | % | ±% |
|---|---|---|---|---|
| Labour Co-op | Florence Eshalomi | 31,615 | 56.1 | −1.2 |
| Liberal Democrats | Sarah Lewis | 12,003 | 21.3 | +0.8 |
| Conservative | Sarah Bool | 9,422 | 16.7 | −1.9 |
| Green | Jacqueline Bond | 2,516 | 4.5 | +2.5 |
| Brexit Party | Andrew McGuinness | 641 | 1.1 | New |
| Independent | Salah Faissal | 136 | 0.2 | New |
| Majority | | 19,612 | 34.8 | −2.0 |
| Turnout | | 56,333 | 63.5 | −3.6 |
| Registered electors | | 88,659 | | |
| Labour Co-op hold | | Swing | −1.0 | |

General election 2017: Vauxhall
| Party | Candidate | Votes | % | ±% |
|---|---|---|---|---|
| Labour | Kate Hoey | 31,576 | 57.3 | +3.5 |
| Liberal Democrats | George Turner | 11,326 | 20.5 | +13.6 |
| Conservative | Dolly Theis | 10,277 | 18.6 | −8.7 |
| Green | Gulnar Hasnain | 1,152 | 2.0 | −5.6 |
| Women's Equality | Harini Iyengar | 539 | 0.9 | New |
| Pirate | Mark Chapman | 172 | 0.3 | −0.1 |
| Majority | | 20,250 | 36.8 | +10.3 |
| Turnout | | 55,042 | 67.1 | +9.2 |
| Registered electors | | 82,055 | | |
| Labour hold | | Swing | −5.1 | |

13.6% was the largest vote share increase in a Labour held seat for the Liberal Democrats at the 2017 general election. UKIP stood down their candidate in order to ensure Hoey was re-elected.

General election 2015: Vauxhall
| Party | Candidate | Votes | % | ±% |
|---|---|---|---|---|
| Labour | Kate Hoey | 25,778 | 53.8 | +4.0 |
| Conservative | James Bellis | 13,070 | 27.3 | +5.8 |
| Green | Gulnar Hasnain | 3,658 | 7.6 | +6.0 |
| Liberal Democrats | Adrian Hyyrylainen-Trett | 3,312 | 6.9 | −18.2 |
| UKIP | Ace Nnorom | 1,385 | 2.9 | New |
| Pirate | Mark Chapman | 201 | 0.4 | New |
| Left Unity | Simon Hardy | 188 | 0.4 | New |
| CISTA | Louis Jensen | 164 | 0.3 | New |
| Whig | Waleed Ghani | 103 | 0.2 | New |
| Socialist (GB) | Daniel Lambert | 82 | 0.2 | −0.2 |
| Majority | | 12,708 | 26.5 | +1.8 |
| Turnout | | 47,941 | 58.3 | +0.6 |
| Registered electors | | 82,231 | | |
| Labour hold | | Swing | +0.9 | |

General election 2010: Vauxhall
| Party | Candidate | Votes | % | ±% |
|---|---|---|---|---|
| Labour | Kate Hoey | 21,498 | 49.8 | −2.0 |
| Liberal Democrats | Caroline Pidgeon | 10,847 | 25.1 | −2.1 |
| Conservative | Glyn Chambers | 9,301 | 21.5 | +7.0 |
| Green | Joseph Healy | 708 | 1.6 | −2.8 |
| English Democrat | Jose Navarro | 289 | 0.7 | +0.1 |
| Christian | Lana Martin | 200 | 0.5 | New |
| Socialist (GB) | Daniel Lambert | 143 | 0.3 | −0.3 |
| Anticapitalists | Jeremy Drinkall | 109 | 0.3 | New |
| Animal Welfare | James Kapetanos | 96 | 0.2 | New |
| Majority | | 10,651 | 24.7 | −2.0 |
| Turnout | | 43,191 | 57.7 | +9.3 |
| Registered electors | | 74,811 | | |
| Labour hold | | Swing | +0.1 | |

=== Elections in the 2000s ===
General election 2005: Vauxhall
| Party | Candidate | Votes | % | ±% |
|---|---|---|---|---|
| Labour | Kate Hoey | 19,744 | 52.9 | −6.2 |
| Liberal Democrats | Charles Anglin | 9,767 | 26.1 | +6.0 |
| Conservative | Edward Heckels | 5,405 | 14.5 | +1.1 |
| Green | Tim Summers | 1,705 | 4.6 | +0.2 |
| UKIP | Robert McWhirter | 271 | 0.7 | New |
| Socialist (GB) | Daniel Lambert | 240 | 0.6 | New |
| English Democrat | Janus Polenceus | 221 | 0.6 | New |
| Majority | | 9,977 | 26.8 | −12.2 |
| Turnout | | 37,363 | 46.9 | +2.1 |
| Registered electors | | 79,637 | | |
| Labour hold | | Swing | | |

General election 2001: Vauxhall
| Party | Candidate | Votes | % | ±% |
|---|---|---|---|---|
| Labour | Kate Hoey | 19,738 | 59.1 | −4.7 |
| Liberal Democrats | Anthony Bottrall | 6,720 | 20.1 | +4.1 |
| Conservative | Gareth Compton | 4,489 | 13.4 | −1.8 |
| Green | Shane Collins | 1,485 | 4.4 | +2.2 |
| Socialist Alliance | Theresa Bennett | 853 | 2.6 | New |
| Independent | Martin Boyd | 107 | 0.3 | New |
| Majority | | 13,018 | 39.0 | −8.8 |
| Turnout | | 33,392 | 44.8 | −10.7 |
| Registered electors | | 74,474 | | |
| Labour hold | | Swing | −4.4 | |

=== Elections in the 1990s ===
General election 1997: Vauxhall
| Party | Candidate | Votes | % | ±% |
|---|---|---|---|---|
| Labour | Kate Hoey | 24,920 | 63.8 | +7.7 |
| Liberal Democrats | Keith Kerr | 6,260 | 16.0 | +1.6 |
| Conservative | Richard Bacon | 5,952 | 15.2 | −11.4 |
| Socialist Labour | Ian Driver | 983 | 2.5 | New |
| Green | Shane Collins | 862 | 2.2 | New |
| Socialist (GB) | Richard Headicar | 97 | 0.3 | New |
| Majority | | 18,660 | 47.8 | +20.9 |
| Turnout | | 39,074 | 55.5 | −6.9 |
| Registered electors | | 70,424 | | |
| Labour hold | | Swing | +3.1 | |

General election 1992: Vauxhall
| Party | Candidate | Votes | % | ±% |
|---|---|---|---|---|
| Labour | Kate Hoey | 21,328 | 54.8 | +4.6 |
| Conservative | Bernard Gentry | 10,840 | 27.8 | −1.2 |
| Liberal Democrats | Mike Tuffrey | 5,678 | 14.6 | −3.6 |
| Green | Penny Shepherd | 803 | 2.1 | +0.3 |
| Independent | A Khan | 156 | 0.4 | New |
| Revolutionary Communist | S. Hill | 152 | 0.4 | New |
| Majority | | 10,488 | 27.0 | +5.8 |
| Turnout | | 38,957 | 62.4 | −1.6 |
| Registered electors | | 62,473 | | |
| Labour hold | | Swing | | |

=== Elections in the 1980s ===
1989 Vauxhall by-election
| Party | Candidate | Votes | % | ±% |
|---|---|---|---|---|
| Labour | Kate Hoey | 15,191 | 52.7 | +2.5 |
| Conservative | Michael Keegan | 5,425 | 18.8 | −10.2 |
| SLD | Mike Tuffrey | 5,043 | 17.5 | −0.7 |
| Green | Henry Bewley | 1,767 | 6.1 | +4.3 |
| The People's Candidate | Hewie Andrew | 302 | 1.1 | New |
| The Greens | Dominic Allen | 264 | 0.9 | New |
| Independent | Rudy Narayan | 179 | 0.6 | New |
| Revolutionary Communist | Don Milligan | 177 | 0.6 | New |
| Official National Front | Patrick Harrington | 127 | 0.4 | New |
| Monster Raving Loony | Screaming Lord Sutch | 106 | 0.4 | New |
| Christian Alliance | David Black | 86 | 0.3 | New |
| National Front | Ted Budden | 83 | 0.3 | New |
| Fellowship | Geoffrey Rolph | 24 | 0.1 | New |
| Leveller Party | William Scola | 21 | 0.1 | New |
| Majority | | 9,766 | 33.9 | +12.7 |
| Turnout | | 28,795 | 44.4 | −19.6 |
| Registered electors | | 64,905 | | |
| Labour hold | | Swing | | |

General election 1987: Vauxhall
| Party | Candidate | Votes | % | ±% |
|---|---|---|---|---|
| Labour | Stuart Holland | 21,364 | 50.2 | +3.7 |
| Conservative | David Lidington | 12,345 | 29.0 | +2.3 |
| SDP | Simon Acland | 7,764 | 18.2 | −6.1 |
| Green | Janice Owens | 770 | 1.8 | New |
| Communist | Dave Cook | 223 | 0.5 | 0.0 |
| Red Front | Kunle Oluremi | 117 | 0.3 | New |
| Majority | | 9,019 | 21.2 | +1.3 |
| Turnout | | 42,583 | 64.0 | −0.5 |
| Registered electors | | 66,538 | | |
| Labour hold | | Swing | | |

General election 1983: Vauxhall
| Party | Candidate | Votes | % | ±% |
|---|---|---|---|---|
| Labour | Stuart Holland | 18,234 | 46.5 | −5.9 |
| Conservative | Kingsley Manning | 10,454 | 26.7 | −7.1 |
| SDP | Roger Liddle | 9,515 | 24.3 | +16.9 |
| National Front | J. Wright | 508 | 1.3 | −2.3 |
| Monster Raving Loony | P. Lingard | 266 | 0.7 | New |
| Communist | Dave Cook | 199 | 0.5 | New |
| Workers Revolutionary | G Shorter (Note: Shorter is not regarded as part of the 21 official WRP candidates in this election.) | 38 | 0.1 | −0.5 |
| Majority | | 7,780 | 19.9 | +1.1 |
| Turnout | | 39,214 | 64.5 | +2.0 |
| Registered electors | | 64,867 | | |
| Labour hold | | Swing | | |

=== Elections in the 1970s ===
General election 1979: Vauxhall
| Party | Candidate | Votes | % | ±% |
|---|---|---|---|---|
| Labour | Stuart Holland | 13,058 | 52.4 | −10.8 |
| Conservative | Philip Linnell Heslop | 8,358 | 33.6 | +10.2 |
| Liberal | Frederick Harrison | 1,842 | 7.4 | −6.1 |
| National Front | Vernon Atkinson | 879 | 3.6 | New |
| Labour Alliance Party | Douglas Elliot | 565 | 2.3 | New |
| Workers Revolutionary | Sarah Hannigan | 153 | 0.6 | New |
| Democratic Monarchist Public Safety White Resident | Bill Boaks | 44 | 0.2 | New |
| Majority | | 4,700 | 18.8 | −21.0 |
| Turnout | | 24,899 | 62.5 | +9.8 |
| Registered electors | | 39,870 | | |
| Labour hold | | Swing | | |

General election October 1974: Vauxhall
| Party | Candidate | Votes | % | ±% |
|---|---|---|---|---|
| Labour | George Strauss | 15,493 | 63.2 | +10.8 |
| Conservative | Victor MacColl | 5,727 | 23.4 | −2.7 |
| Liberal | Edward Cousins | 3,300 | 13.5 | −4.4 |
| Majority | | 9,766 | 39.8 | +9.5 |
| Turnout | | 24,520 | 52.7 | −9.5 |
| Registered electors | | 46,502 | | |
| Labour hold | | Swing | | |

General election February 1974: Vauxhall
| Party | Candidate | Votes | % | ±% |
|---|---|---|---|---|
| Labour | George Strauss | 16,135 | 52.4 | −11.2 |
| Conservative | Margaret Marshall | 7,494 | 26.1 | −10.3 |
| Liberal | Edward Cousins | 5,139 | 17.9 | New |
| Majority | | 8,641 | 30.3 | +2.9 |
| Turnout | | 28,768 | 62.2 | +7.8 |
| Registered electors | | 46,261 | | |
| Labour hold | | Swing | | |

General election 1970: Vauxhall
| Party | Candidate | Votes | % | ±% |
|---|---|---|---|---|
| Labour | George Strauss | 13,046 | 63.6 | −3.0 |
| Conservative | Clive Jones | 7,477 | 36.4 | +3.0 |
| Majority | | 5,569 | 27.2 | −6.0 |
| Turnout | | 20,523 | 54.4 | −4.2 |
| Registered electors | | 37,707 | | |
| Labour hold | | Swing | | |

=== Elections in the 1960s ===
General election 1966: Vauxhall
| Party | Candidate | Votes | % | ±% |
|---|---|---|---|---|
| Labour | George Strauss | 15,233 | 66.6 | +2.49 |
| Conservative | Spencer Le Marchant | 7,645 | 33.4 | −2.49 |
| Majority | | 7,588 | 33.2 | +4.98 |
| Turnout | | 22,878 | 58.6 | −0.58 |
| Registered electors | | 39,042 | | |
| Labour hold | | Swing | | |

General election 1964: Vauxhall
| Party | Candidate | Votes | % | ±% |
|---|---|---|---|---|
| Labour | George Strauss | 15,458 | 64.11 | +2.13 |
| Conservative | David Lane | 8,653 | 35.89 | −2.13 |
| Majority | | 6,805 | 28.22 | +4.26 |
| Turnout | | 24,111 | 59.18 | −5.77 |
| Registered electors | | 40,743 | | |
| Labour hold | | Swing | | |

=== Elections in the 1950s ===
General election 1959: Vauxhall
| Party | Candidate | Votes | % | ±% |
|---|---|---|---|---|
| Labour | George Strauss | 18,437 | 61.98 | −2.71 |
| Conservative | Elizabeth Havers | 11,312 | 38.02 | +2.71 |
| Majority | | 7,125 | 23.96 | −5.42 |
| Turnout | | 29,749 | 64.95 | +2.21 |
| Registered electors | | 45,802 | | |
| Labour hold | | Swing | | |

General election 1955: Vauxhall
| Party | Candidate | Votes | % | ±% |
|---|---|---|---|---|
| Labour | George Strauss | 19,220 | 64.69 | −1.15 |
| Conservative | Edwin Lee | 10,492 | 35.31 | +1.15 |
| Majority | | 8,728 | 29.38 | −2.3 |
| Turnout | | 29,712 | 62.74 | −10.91 |
| Registered electors | | 47,354 | | |
| Labour hold | | Swing | | |

General election 1951: Vauxhall
| Party | Candidate | Votes | % | ±% |
|---|---|---|---|---|
| Labour | George Strauss | 24,217 | 65.84 | +3.34 |
| Conservative | Edwin Lee | 12,564 | 34.16 | +6.46 |
| Majority | | 11,653 | 31.68 | −3.22 |
| Turnout | | 36,781 | 73.65 | −2.05 |
| Registered electors | | 49,939 | | |
| Labour hold | | Swing | | |

General election 1950: Vauxhall
| Party | Candidate | Votes | % |
|---|---|---|---|
| Labour | George Strauss | 23,988 | 62.5 |
| Conservative | Alfred Lockwood | 10,618 | 27.7 |
| Liberal | Walter Dyer | 3,251 | 8.5 |
| Communist | Margot Heinemann | 508 | 1.3 |
| Majority | | 13,370 | 34.8 |
| Turnout | | 38,365 | 75.7 |
| Registered electors | | 50,673 | |
| Labour win (new seat) | | | |

== See also ==
- Parliamentary constituencies in London

== Notes ==
Parliament of the United Kingdom
| Preceded by Thirsk and Malton | Constituency represented by the father of the House; 1974–1979 | Succeeded by Dagenham |
