= 2015 Labour Party leadership election (UK) =

British leadership election to replace Ed Miliband

- 14 August – 12 September 2015
- Turnout: 422,871 (76.3%) ▲4.6 pp
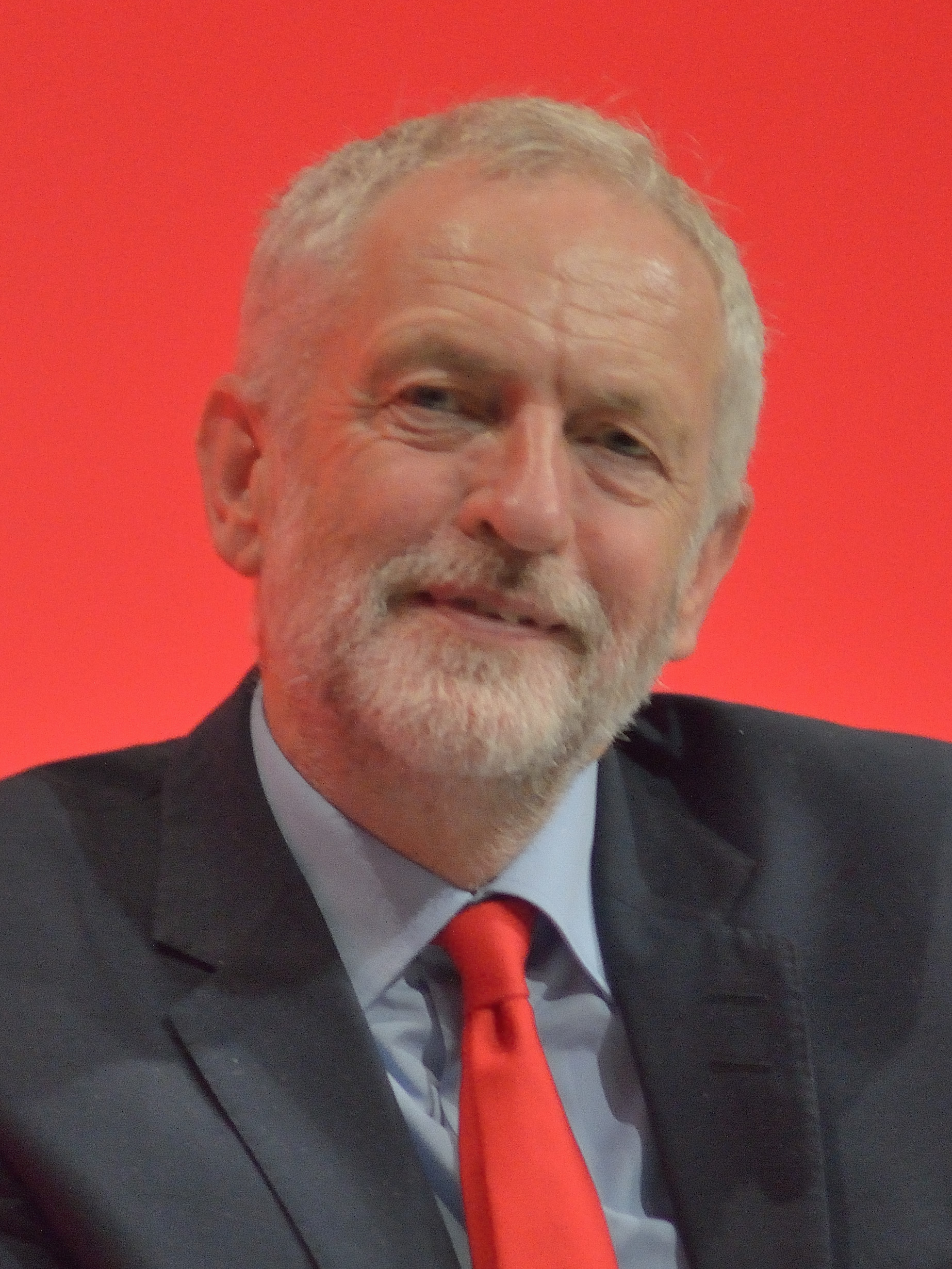

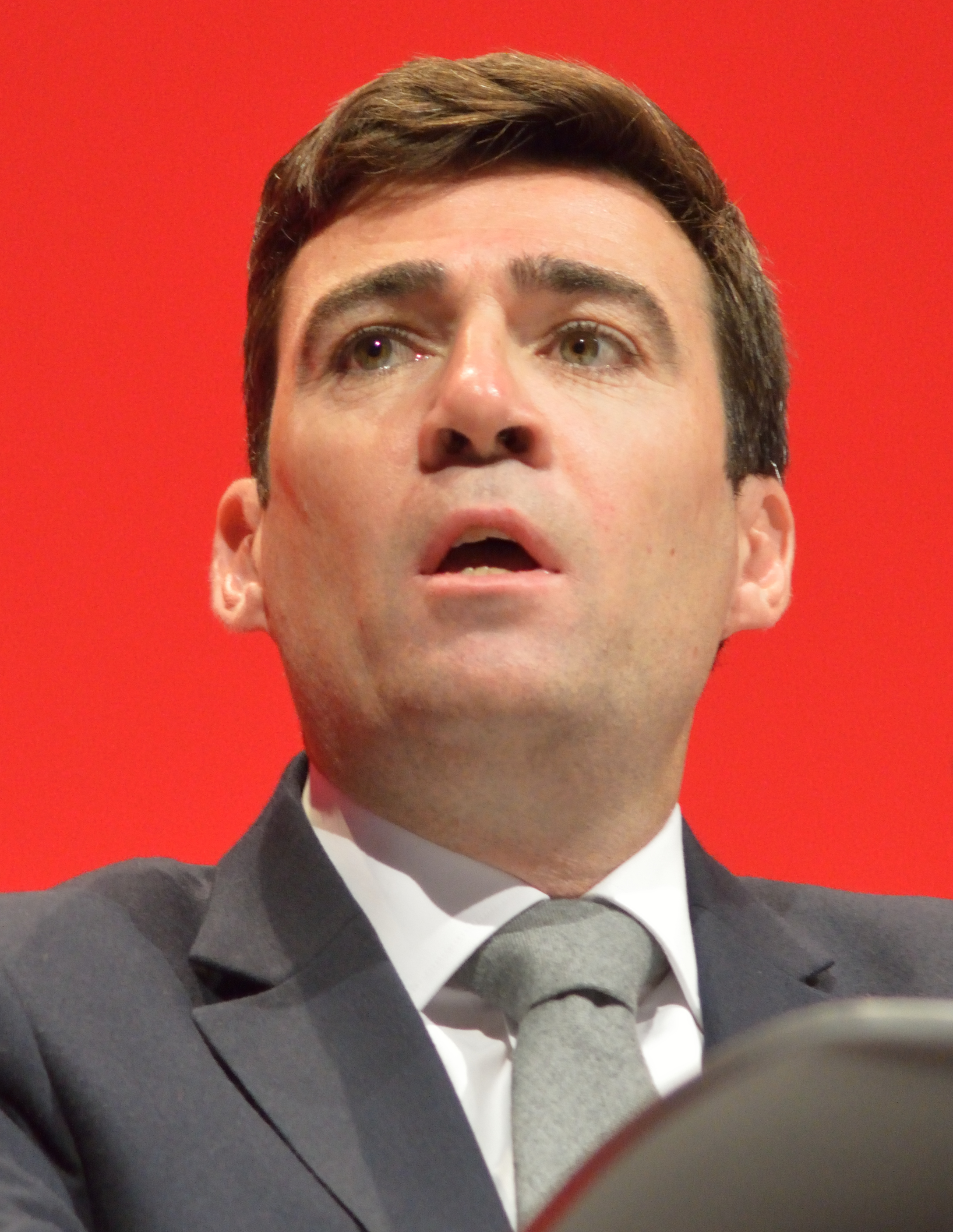

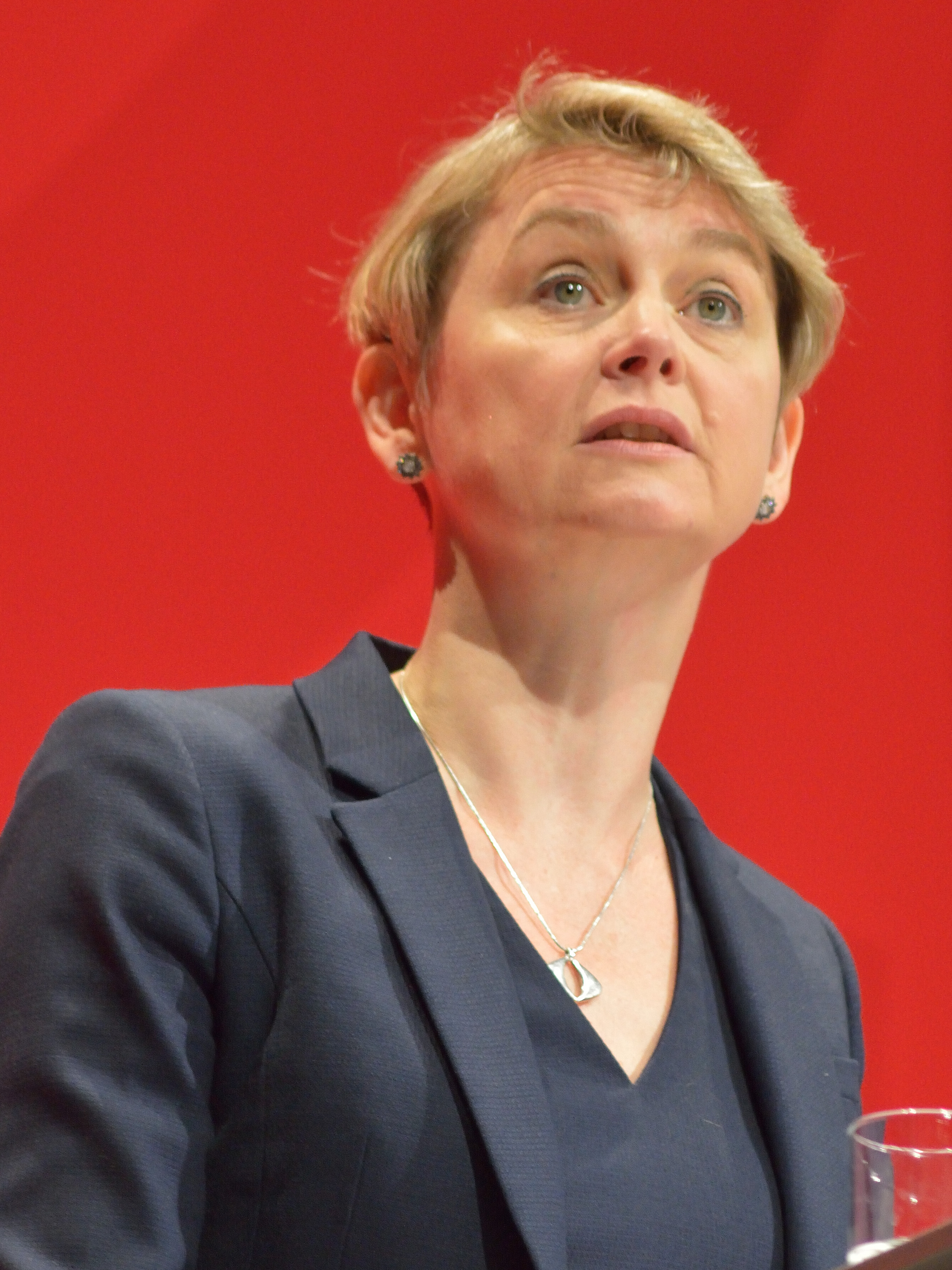

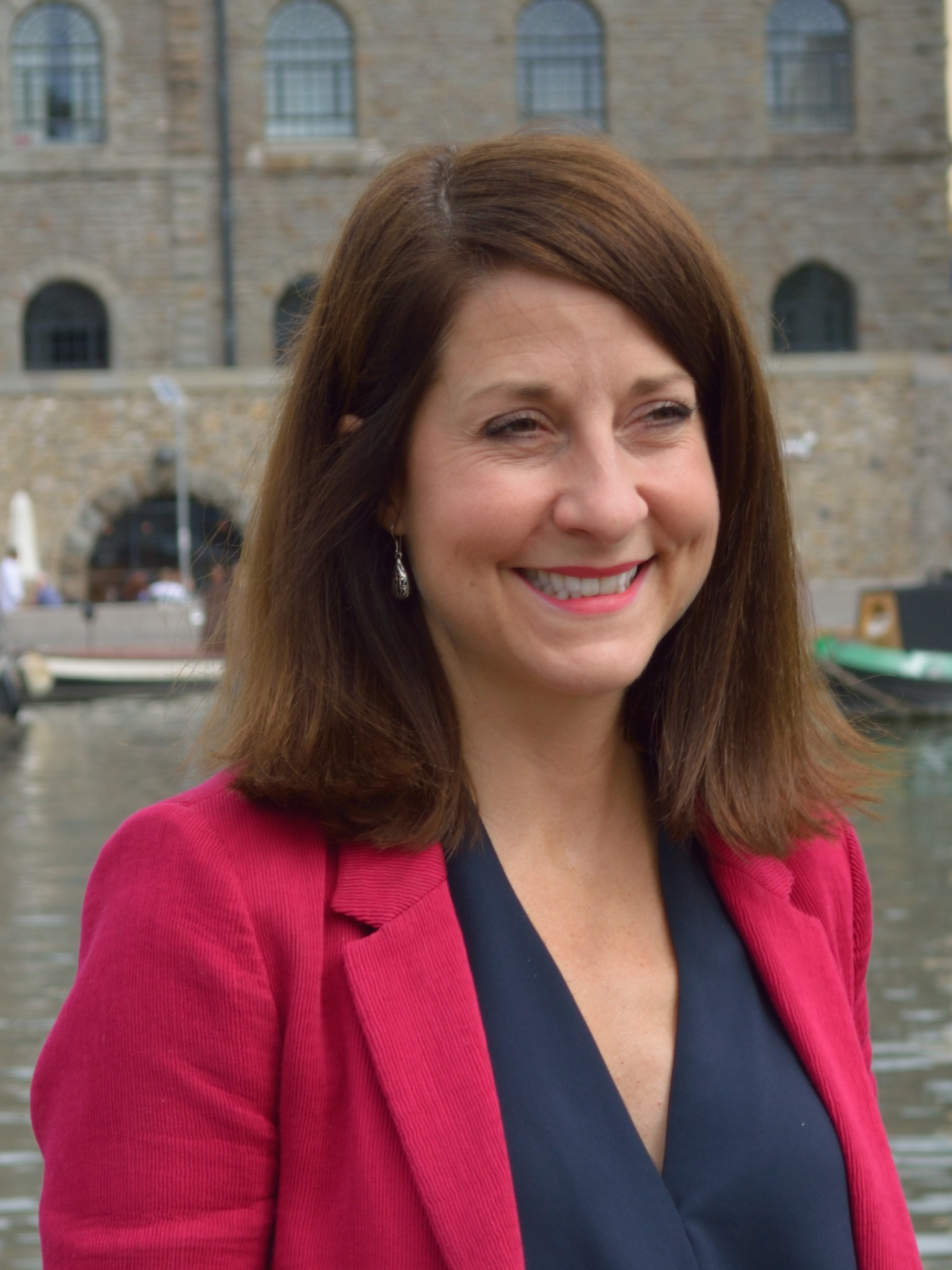
Candidate	Jeremy Corbyn	Andy Burnham
Popular vote	251,417	80,462
Percentage	59.5%	19.0%
Candidate	Yvette Cooper	Liz Kendall
Popular vote	71,928	18,857
Percentage	17.0%	4.5%
Leader before election
Harriet Harman (acting)
Ed Miliband
Elected Leader
Jeremy Corbyn

The 2015 Labour Party leadership election was triggered by the resignation of Ed Miliband as Leader of the Labour Party on 8 May 2015, following the party's defeat at the 2015 general election. Harriet Harman, the Deputy Leader, became Acting Leader but announced that she would stand down following the leadership election. It was won by Jeremy Corbyn in the first round. In the 2015 Labour Party deputy leadership election, which was run simultaneously, Tom Watson was elected to succeed Harman as deputy leader.

Four candidates were successfully nominated to stand in the election: Andy Burnham, Yvette Cooper, Jeremy Corbyn, and Liz Kendall. The voting process began on Friday 14 August 2015 and closed on Thursday 10 September 2015, and the results were announced on Saturday 12 September 2015. Voting was by Labour Party members and registered and affiliated supporters, using the alternative vote system.

Support for Corbyn, who entered the race as a dark horse candidate, and the release of opinion polls which showed him leading the race, led to high-profile interventions by a number of prominent Labour figures including Gordon Brown, Tony Blair, Jack Straw, David Miliband, and Alastair Campbell, among others, many of whom argued that Corbyn's election as leader would leave the party unelectable.

Despite these interventions, Corbyn was elected in the first round receiving 59.5% of the votes, winning in all three sections of the ballot. Less than a year later, a leadership challenge saw another leadership election, where Corbyn again won, with an increased share of the vote. In July 2026, Burnham succeeded Keir Starmer as Labour leader.

== Procedure ==
The leadership election, triggered by Ed Miliband's resignation, took place under the reformed rules adopted from the proposals of the February 2014 Collins Report, which was led by Ray Collins, and was itself partly the result of calls for inquiry and reform relating to the 2013 Falkirk Selection Scandal. The plan entailed a shorter election than the one that took place in 2010, with a new leader being in place before Labour's party conference in September 2015.

The review changed the way in which Labour elects leaders. Under the former system, a three-way electoral college chose the leader, with one-third weight given to the votes of the Parliamentary Labour Party (i.e., Labour members of the House of Commons and Labour members of the European Parliament), one-third to individual Labour Party members, and one third to the trade union and affiliated societies sections. Following the Collins review, the electoral college was replaced by a pure "one member, one vote" (OMOV) system. Candidates are elected by members and registered and affiliated supporters, who all receive a maximum of one vote and all votes are weighted equally. This meant that, for example, members of Labour-affiliated trade unions needed to register as Labour supporters to vote.

To stand, candidates now needed to be nominated by at least 15% of the Parliamentary Labour Party (PLP), i.e. 35 MPs, at that time. The vote, as in previous elections, was held under the alternative vote (instant-runoff) system. The deputy leadership election was held under the same rules.

The election itself was overseen by Electoral Reform Services.

In late August, the Labour Party reported that about 552,000 members and supporters were eligible to vote; about 292,000 full members, 148,000 affiliated supporters (members of trade unions and socialist societies who opted to affiliate), plus 112,000 registered supporters.

=== Timetable ===
A meeting of Labour's National Executive Committee took place on 13 May 2015 to set a timetable and procedure for the two elections.

- Tuesday 9 June 2015 – Nominations open
- Monday 15 June 2015 (12:00) – Nominations for the Leader close
- Wednesday 17 June 2015 (12:00) – Nominations for the Deputy Leader close
- Wednesday 17 June 2015 (12:00) – Hustings period opens
- Friday 31 July 2015 (12:00) – Supporting nominations close
- Wednesday 12 August 2015 (15:00) – Last date to join as member, affiliated support or registered supporter and be able to vote
- Friday 14 August 2015 – Ballot papers are sent out
- Thursday 10 September 2015 (12:00) – Ballot closes
- Saturday 12 September 2015 – Special Conference to announce the results

The deadline on 12 August 2015 to join as a member or supporter was extended by 3 hours due to heavy demand making the party website difficult to use.

== Candidates ==
=== Nominated ===
To be placed on the ballot, candidates for leader had to obtain the nominations of 35 MPs. An MP who nominates a candidate does not have to subsequently support, or vote for, that candidate. Some MPs have stated that they nominated only to ensure that candidate got onto the ballot paper.

The four candidates officially nominated by members of the Parliamentary Labour Party
Candidate	Constituency	Office	Announced	PLP Nominations	Share
Andy Burnham (campaign)	Leigh	Shadow Health Secretary (2011–2015)	13 May 2015	68	29.31%
Yvette Cooper	Normanton, Pontefract and Castleford	Shadow Home Secretary (2011–2015)	13 May 2015	59	25.43%
Liz Kendall	Leicester West	Shadow Minister for Care and Older People (2011–2015)	10 May 2015	41	17.76%
Jeremy Corbyn (campaign)	Islington North	None	3 June 2015	36	15.52%
Undeclared				28	12.07%

The number of MPs next to the candidate's name below includes the candidate, who can count as one of the 35 MPs needed. Public nominations for candidates by MPs were as follows:

- Andy Burnham (68): Debbie Abrahams, Heidi Alexander, David Anderson, Hilary Benn, Luciana Berger, Clive Betts, Paul Blomfield, Kevin Brennan, Julie Cooper, David Crausby, Alex Cunningham, Wayne David, Peter Dowd, Michael Dugher, Bill Esterson, Paul Farrelly, Rob Flello, Yvonne Fovargue, Pat Glass, Mary Glindon, Lilian Greenwood, Margaret Greenwood, Nia Griffith, Andrew Gwynne, Harry Harpham, Carolyn Harris, Stephen Hepburn, Kate Hoey, Kate Hollern, Dan Jarvis, Gerald Jones, Graham Jones, Barbara Keeley, Ian Lavery, Emma Lewell-Buck, Ian Lucas, Holly Lynch, Justin Madders, Rachael Maskell, Chris Matheson, Kerry McCarthy, Andy McDonald, Conor McGinn, Liz McInnes, Alan Meale, Ian Mearns, Lisa Nandy, Albert Owen, Teresa Pearce, Lucy Powell, Yasmin Qureshi, Angela Rayner, Jamie Reed, Christina Rees, Rachel Reeves, Steve Rotheram, Jeff Smith, Owen Smith, Keir Starmer, Jo Stevens, Nick Thomas-Symonds, Anna Turley, Karl Turner, Derek Twigg, Valerie Vaz, Alan Whitehead, Iain Wright
- Yvette Cooper (59): Jonathan Ashworth, Ian Austin, Adrian Bailey, Roberta Blackman-Woods, Lyn Brown, Nick Brown, Chris Bryant, Karen Buck, Richard Burden, Liam Byrne, Ruth Cadbury, Ann Clwyd, Vernon Coaker, Judith Cummins, Jim Cunningham, Nic Dakin, Geraint Davies, Thangam Debbonaire, Jack Dromey, Maria Eagle, Jim Fitzpatrick, Colleen Fletcher, Vicky Foxcroft, Helen Goodman, Kate Green, Fabian Hamilton, David Hanson, Sue Hayman, John Healey, Sharon Hodgson, George Howarth, Diana Johnson, Helen Jones, Kevan Jones, Stephen Kinnock, Chris Leslie, Khalid Mahmood, Shabana Mahmood, Seema Malhotra, John Mann, Steve McCabe, Catherine McKinnell, Madeleine Moon, Melanie Onn, Matthew Pennycook, Jess Phillips, Bridget Phillipson, Stephen Pound, Marie Rimmer, Geoffrey Robinson, Naz Shah, Virendra Sharma, Paula Sherriff, Andy Slaughter, Ruth Smeeth, Karin Smyth, John Spellar, Daniel Zeichner
- Liz Kendall (41): Kevin Barron, Tom Blenkinsop, Jenny Chapman, Ann Coffey, Simon Danczuk, Gloria De Piero, Stephen Doughty, Jim Dowd, Julie Elliott, Louise Ellman, Chris Evans, Paul Flynn, Mike Gapes, Mark Hendrick, Margaret Hodge, Tristram Hunt, Mike Kane, Peter Kyle, Ivan Lewis, Fiona Mactaggart, Siobhain McDonagh, Pat McFadden, Alison McGovern, Jessica Morden, Toby Perkins, Steve Reed, Jonathan Reynolds, Emma Reynolds, Joan Ryan, Barry Sheerman, Gavin Shuker, Nick Smith, Angela Smith, Wes Streeting, Gisela Stuart, Stephen Timms, Stephen Twigg, Chuka Umunna, Phil Wilson, John Woodcock
- Jeremy Corbyn (36): Diane Abbott, Rushanara Ali, Margaret Beckett, Richard Burgon, Dawn Butler, Ronnie Campbell, Sarah Champion, Jo Cox, Neil Coyle, Jon Cruddas, Clive Efford, Frank Field, Louise Haigh, Kelvin Hopkins, Rupa Huq, Imran Hussain, Huw Irranca-Davies, Sadiq Khan, David Lammy, Clive Lewis, Rebecca Long-Bailey, Gordon Marsden, John McDonnell, Michael Meacher, Grahame Morris, Chi Onwurah, Kate Osamor, Tulip Siddiq, Dennis Skinner, Andrew Smith, Cat Smith, Gareth Thomas, Emily Thornberry, Jon Trickett, Catherine West

Before dropping out of the race on 12 June, Mary Creagh had 10 nominations: Sarah Champion, Jo Cox, Neil Coyle, Thangam Debbonaire, Helen Hayes, Susan Jones, Mike Kane, Stephen Kinnock, Tulip Siddiq

A total of 26 Labour MPs did not nominate any candidate: Graham Allen, Ben Bradshaw, Alan Campbell, Rosie Cooper, Mary Creagh, Stella Creasy, John Cryer, Angela Eagle, Natascha Engel, Caroline Flint, Barry Gardiner, Roger Godsiff, Harriet Harman, Meg Hillier, Lindsay Hoyle, Alan Johnson, Gerald Kaufman, Ed Miliband, Rob Marris, Ian Murray, Graham Stringer, Mark Tami, Keith Vaz, Tom Watson, David Winnick, Rosie Winterton

=== Withdrew ===
- Mary Creagh, Shadow Secretary of State for International Development and MP for Wakefield
- Chuka Umunna, Shadow Secretary of State for Business, Innovation and Skills and MP for Streatham

=== Explored ===
- Tristram Hunt, Shadow Secretary of State for Education and MP for Stoke-on-Trent Central

=== Publicly expressed interest ===
- David Lammy, former Minister of State for Innovation, Universities and Skills and MP for Tottenham (ran for Mayor of London)
- Jamie Reed, MP for Copeland

=== Declined ===
- Diane Abbott, former Shadow Minister for Public Health, candidate for leader in 2010 and MP for Hackney North and Stoke Newington (ran for Mayor of London)
- Rushanara Ali, former Shadow Minister for Education and MP for Bethnal Green and Bow (ran for Deputy Leader)
- Stella Creasy, MP for Walthamstow (ran for Deputy Leader)
- Angela Eagle, Shadow Leader of the House of Commons, former Exchequer Secretary to the Treasury and MP for Wallasey (ran for Deputy Leader)
- Dan Jarvis, Shadow Minister of Justice and MP for Barnsley Central
- Alan Johnson, former Home Secretary, former Secretary of State for Health and MP for Hull West and Hessle
- Ian Lavery, MP for Wansbeck
- John McDonnell, MP for Hayes and Harlington
- Alison McGovern, MP for Wirral South
- Lisa Nandy, MP for Wigan
- Rachel Reeves, Shadow Secretary of State for Work and Pensions and MP for Leeds West
- Owen Smith, Shadow Secretary of State for Wales and MP for Pontypridd
- Keir Starmer, former Director of Public Prosecutions and MP for Holborn and St Pancras
- Jon Trickett, Shadow Minister without Portfolio, former Shadow Minister for the Cabinet Office and MP for Hemsworth

== Media reaction ==
=== Burnham ===
Burnham was praised for having both "a radical left-wing vision" and being credible enough "to unite the party and win back power", as well as for being someone who "actually listens to party members and the public".

Burnham attracted press criticism for claiming £17,000 a year from the taxpayer to rent a London flat, despite owning another within walking distance of the House of Commons. A spokesman for Burnham said that renting out the original flat was necessary to "cover his costs" as parliamentary rule changes meant he was no longer able to claim for mortgage interest expenses. Burnham was criticised for saying that Labour should have a woman leader "when the time is right", with the New Statesman saying that he had "tripped over his mouth again".

=== Cooper ===
Cooper was praised by the Huffington Post for her hard work in local constituencies during the leadership contest and for her preparation for the Local Government Association hustings.

She has been criticised both for thanking David Miliband for putting her as his second choice (after Liz Kendall) and for her "broken, downbeat delivery".

=== Corbyn ===
Corbyn's leadership bid was the subject of fierce discussion within the media. Janan Ganesh in the Financial Times argued that the election of Corbyn "spells disaster" for the Labour Party. Owen Jones argued in The Guardian that the reason Corbyn was so popular was because he "offers a coherent, inspiring and, crucially, a hopeful vision" addressing social injustice and economic inequality, comparing the surge of support for Corbyn to the popularity of both UKIP in England and the Scottish National Party (SNP) in Scotland.

=== Kendall ===
In June 2015, Kendall's leadership bid received praise from The Sun, who said that she is the "only prayer they [the Labour Party] have". The Sun also praised her for saying 'the country comes first' in response to Andy Burnham who said 'the [Labour] Party always comes first' in the Newsnight Labour leadership hustings. Commentators from across the political spectrum have said that Kendall is the leadership candidate that the Conservatives "fear the most".

However, the Huffington Post criticised her, saying "Liz Kendall just doesn't seem to have it, she seems to be always on the verge of tripping over her own words, as if she is perpetually being caught off guard."

== Dispute over election integrity ==
Labour Party membership since 1993

Labour Party full members (excluding affiliates and supporters)

One of the most notable features of the election was the large increase in Labour Party membership, and the registration of significant numbers of the new affiliated and registered classes of voting supporters, during the period of the campaign. Concern was expressed that the new rules were unfairly benefiting Corbyn, and there might be a legal challenge, but in the event the result was so decisive these concerns were not pursued after the election.

In June 2015, the Conservative-identifying political commentator Toby Young wrote in the Telegraph encouraging Conservatives to join Labour to vote for Jeremy Corbyn, his reason being "to consign Labour to electoral oblivion". This trended on Twitter as #ToriesforCorbyn and the attempt, as well as Labour's response, were subject to criticism. Two days later the Communist Party of Great Britain (Provisional Central Committee) wrote also in support of Corbyn. Following this, Labour MP John Mann called for the election to be halted. Acting leader of the party Harriet Harman responded by calling on constituency parties to check new members, but stated that Labour has "a robust system to prevent fraudulent or malicious applications." Labour MP Fabian Hamilton stated there was "no evidence" that groups were trying to infiltrate the election. Leadership candidates Andy Burnham and Liz Kendall also responded by saying there was no evidence of infiltration, and while not dismissing the claims, Corbyn stated he only wanted "genuine Labour supporters" to vote for him.

=== Rejected voters ===
It emerged in early August 2015 that 260 former candidates from the Green Party, Left Unity and the Trade Unionist and Socialist Coalition had attempted to become registered supporters but would now be blocked from voting. Shortly before this it was revealed that Conservative MP and former junior minister Tim Loughton had been caught applying to become a registered Labour supporter, subsequently claiming that his intention was to "blow the gaff on what a complete farce the whole thing is". Veteran Labour MP Barry Sheerman also joined calls for the election to be "paused" over the fears of infiltration by other parties. The Labour Party told representatives of the four candidates at a meeting on 11 August that 1,200 members and supporters of other parties had been excluded and a further 800 were under investigation. Harriet Harman at the time admitted that as many as 100,000 people may be blocked from voting.

The number of those rejected would eventually reach 56,000, around 9.1% of the 610,753 considered eligible to vote at the start of the contest. According to the party, 45,000 of those were rejected for not being on the electoral register.

Labour also confirmed that it would cancel supporters' votes after they had been cast if it was found that they were members of other parties. A number of high-profile individuals were blocked from voting, including Marcus Chown, Jeremy Hardy, Douglas Henshall, Ken Loach, Francesca Martinez, Mark Serwotka, Pete Sinclair, Mark Steel, Luke Wright and Toby Young.

Andrew MacKinlay, a former Labour MP, further alleged that Labour was attempting to rig its own leadership election against Corbyn; a view shared by comedian Jeremy Hardy. Such allegations became known to the media – and particularly Corbyn supporters – as the "Labour Purge", with #LabourPurge trending on Twitter. Claims of such a "purge" of Corbyn supporters were rejected by Harman who insisted that the exclusion processes were impartial to candidates. Scottish newspaper The National printed a page-long satirical cartoon speculating further vote-rigging by Labour's leadership.

=== Missing ballots ===
With less than 24 hours to go before the voting deadline, the party closed their telephone helpline. The move came during widespread complaints from "thousands" of voters who were missing emailed or physical ballot papers. The Guardian reported that one of their sources in the leadership camps stated that "the party has basically decided to stop taking calls and if you don't have a vote, you're now basically not getting one." The party refused to confirm how many ballot papers had actually been sent. Andy Burnham publicly criticised the number of missing ballots and the closure of the phone line.

Labour MP David Lammy called for a full inquiry into the missing ballot papers. Of the 200 people his team phone called in London on the eve of the deadline, one in five were missing their ballots.

== Debates ==
=== Television ===
Programme	Date	Moderator	Channel	Location	Information
Newsnight	Wednesday 17 June; 19.00	Laura Kuenssberg	BBC Two		On BBC iPlayer
Victoria Derbyshire	Monday 13 July; 09.15	Victoria Derbyshire	BBC Two		On BBC iPlayer
Sunday Politics	Sunday 19 July; 11.00	Andrew Neil	BBC One		On BBC iPlayer
Labour Leadership Hustings	Tuesday 1 September; 15.30	Krishnan Guru-Murthy	Channel 4		On Channel 4 News
Labour's Future: The Final Debate	Thursday 3 September; 19.00	Adam Boulton	Sky News	Sage 2, The Sage, Gateshead	On Sky News' YouTube

=== Radio ===
Show	Date	Moderator	Station	Information
The Labour Leadership Debate	Wednesday 22 July; 19.00	Iain Dale	LBC	On LBC website
5 Live Breakfast	Tuesday 25 August; 08.30	Nicky Campbell	BBC Radio 5 Live	On BBC iPlayer Radio

=== Online ===
Show	Date	Moderator	Panel	Online provider	Information
The future of Labour: meet the next leader	Thursday 27 August; 19:10	Hugh Muir	Rafael Behr, John Harris and Anne Perkins	The Guardian	Live stream

== Opinion polling ==
The polls in this section have been undertaken by media pollsters known to use industry standard polling methods.

The polls below were conducted after nominations for the leadership ballot closed.

Where there is more than one line for a poll, this is for when a candidate has been eliminated and their second or third preference votes passed onto another candidate.

=== Polling of eligible voters ===
The polls below show voting intention amongst those eligible to vote in the leadership election.

==== July 2015 ====
YouGov, 17–21 July 2015, 1,054 eligible voters (Note: Labour Party members, registered supporters and signed up trade unionists who are eligible to vote in the leadership election)
Candidate	Party Members	Affiliates/£3 sign ups (Note: Members of affiliated Trade Unions who signed up to vote in the leadership election, and members of the public who paid £3 and signed up to receive a vote in the leadership election.)	Total
First Round
Jeremy Corbyn	40%	57%	43%
Andy Burnham	27%	21%	26%
Yvette Cooper	21%	14%	20%
Liz Kendall	12%	8%	11%
Second Round
Jeremy Corbyn	41%	60%	44%
Andy Burnham	31%	22%	29%
Yvette Cooper	28%	18%	26%
Final Round
Jeremy Corbyn	50%	69%	53%
Andy Burnham	50%	31%	47%

==== August 2015 ====
YouGov, 6–10 August 2015, 1,411 eligible voters
Candidate	Party Members	Union affiliates (Note: Members of affiliated Trade Unions who signed up to vote in the leadership election.)	Registered supporters (Note: Members of the public who paid £3 and signed up to receive a vote in the leadership election.)	Total (Note: Note that Labour Party rules state that the candidate who wins over 50% of the votes is declared the winner; thus, on these figures, Corbyn would have won without the need for a second or third round.)
First Round
Jeremy Corbyn	49%	67%	55%	53%
Andy Burnham	22%	14%	24%	21%
Yvette Cooper	20%	10%	18%	18%
Liz Kendall	9%	8%	4%	8%
Second Round
Jeremy Corbyn	50%	69%	56%	54%
Andy Burnham	24%	16%	24%	23%
Yvette Cooper	26%	15%	20%	23%
Corbyn vs Burnham (Note: As Cooper and Burnham tied for second place in the poll's second round, YouGov published data showing the result in a run-off between Corbyn/Burnham and Corbyn/Cooper.)
Jeremy Corbyn	56%	72%	64%	60%
Andy Burnham	44%	28%	36%	40%
Corbyn vs Cooper (Note: As Burnham and Cooper tied for second place in the poll's second round, YouGov published data showing the result in a run-off between Corbyn/Burnham and Corbyn/Cooper.)
Jeremy Corbyn	57%	76%	66%	62%
Yvette Cooper	43%	24%	34%	38%

=== Polling of Labour voters ===
The polls below asked Labour supporters across the country how they would vote in the leadership election if they were eligible.

Poll source	Date(s) administered	Sample size	Andy Burnham	Yvette Cooper	Jeremy Corbyn	Liz Kendall	Don't Know
Opinium	21–25 August 2015	474 Labour voters (Note: People who are likely to vote Labour in next general election.)	27%	22%	39%	12%	–
Opinium	11–14 August 2015	499 Labour voters	29%	19%	37%	15%	–
Research Now	28–29 July 2015	? Labour voters (Note: People who voted Labour in 2015 general election.)	36%	20%	28%	16%	–
Opinium	24–27 July 2015	481 Labour voters	39%	22%	24%	15%	–
Ipsos MORI	14–16 June 2015	275 Labour voters	23%	20%	9%	11%	38%

=== Polling of British voters ===
The polls below asked voters across the country how they would vote in the leadership election if they were eligible.

Poll source	Date(s) administered	Sample size	Andy Burnham	Yvette Cooper	Jeremy Corbyn	Liz Kendall	Other/ Undecided
Opinium	21–25 August 2015	1,711 British voters (Note: People who are likely to vote in next general election, excluding residents unlikely to vote.)	18%	13%	26%	11%	32%
Opinium	11–14 August 2015	1,719 British voters	18%	12%	23%	11%	36%
Survation	12–13 August 2015	1,007 British residents (Note: Residents over 18 in Great Britain after watching video clips of candidates)	25%	15%	28%	12%	19%
Research Now	28–29 July 2015	1,001 British residents (Note: Residents over 18 in Great Britain)	30%	24%	24%	21%	1%
Opinium	24–27 July 2015	1,732 British residents	21%	14%	16%	12%	38%
ORB/Independent	21–23 June 2015	2,000 British residents	36%	20%	18%	25%	1%
Ipsos MORI	14–16 June 2015	1,005 British residents	15%	14%	5%	11%	55%

=== Polling of London voters ===
The polls below asked voters in London how they would vote in the leadership election if they were eligible.

Poll source	Date(s) administered	Sample size	Andy Burnham	Yvette Cooper	Jeremy Corbyn	Liz Kendall	Other/ Undecided
YouGov/London Evening Standard	10–12 August 2015	1,153 London residents (Note: Residents over 18 in London)	21%	20%	46%	12%	–
YouGov/London Evening Standard	10–12 August 2015	1,153 London residents	11%	10%	24%	6%	48%

=== Polling before close of nominations ===
==== Labour members ====
The polls below were conducted before nominations for the leadership closed and therefore include Labour politicians who were not in the final four candidates who were nominated.

Poll source	Date(s)	Sample size	Andy Burnham	Chuka Umunna	Yvette Cooper	Dan Jarvis	Liz Kendall	David Miliband	Other	Don't Know
ESRC/YouGov	12–15 May 2015	1,200 Labour members (Note: People who are due-paying members of the Labour Party.)	18%	12%	9%	5%	2%	2%	34%	38%

==== Labour voters ====
Poll source	Date(s)	Sample size	Andy Burnham	Chuka Umunna	Yvette Cooper	Dan Jarvis	Rachel Reeves	Tristram Hunt	Liz Kendall	Other/ Undecided
Survation/Mail on Sunday	8–9 May 2015	329 Labour voters (Note: People who say they would vote Labour at the next general election.)	20%	17%	11%	9%	7%	6%	6%	24%

Poll source	Date(s)	Sample size	David Miliband	Chuka Umunna	Andy Burnham	Yvette Cooper	Dan Jarvis	Tristram Hunt	Liz Kendall	Rachel Reeves	Other/ Undecided
Survation/Mail on Sunday	8–9 May 2015	329 Labour voters (Note: People who say they would vote Labour at the next general election.)	24%	18%	15%	10%	8%	4%	4%	3%	14%

==== Former Labour PPCs ====
Poll source	Date(s)	Sample size	Andy Burnham	Yvette Cooper	Tristram Hunt	Liz Kendall	Chuka Umunna	Other/ Undecided
Westminster Public Affairs	11–15 May 2015	62 former Labour PPCs (Note: People who were unsuccessful Labour Party candidates in the 2015 general election. The 62 defeated parliamentary candidates gave their views anonymously.)	27%	8%	3%	18%	13%	31%

==== British residents ====
Poll source	Date(s)	Sample size	Andy Burnham	Yvette Cooper	Tristram Hunt	Dan Jarvis	Liz Kendall	David Miliband	Rachel Reeves	Chuka Umunna	Don't Know
Survation/Mail on Sunday	8–9 May 2015	1,027 British residents	14.1%	11.2%	6%	6.4%	5.1%	—	4.2%	12.2%	40.6%
Survation/Mail on Sunday	8–9 May 2015	1,027 British residents	12%	8%	6%	6%	5%	18%	3.%	11%	31%

== Result ==
Candidate	Party members		Registered supporters		Affiliated supporters		Total	
Candidate	Votes	%	Votes	%	Votes	%	Votes	%
Jeremy Corbyn ✓	121,751	49.6	88,449	83.8	41,217	57.6	251,417	59.5
Andy Burnham	55,698	22.7	6,160	5.8	18,604	26.0	80,462	19.0
Yvette Cooper	54,470	22.2	8,415	8.0	9,043	12.6	71,928	17.0
Liz Kendall	13,601	5.5	2,574	2.4	2,682	3.8	18,857	4.5

Turnout for the vote was 422,871 (76.3%) of the 554,272 eligible voters, with 207 spoilt ballots. 343,995 votes (81.3%) were cast online, the UK's largest online ballot.

== Political reaction to the result ==
=== Domestic ===
Labour Party

Ed Miliband, former party leader, offered his support to Corbyn and urged other Labour MPs to do so, though he ruled himself out of taking on a position in Corbyn's shadow cabinet, to focus on representing his constituency. Kezia Dugdale, then leader of Scottish Labour, declared that "politics has changed" and people desired a "radical change", with Corbyn's election to the leadership showing that Labour had "listened to that call". Carwyn Jones, then leader of Welsh Labour and First Minister of Wales, congratulated Corbyn and urged the party to embrace the fact that the campaign had "energised a huge number of people who were previously disengaged from party politics" and unite around their new leader.

Corbyn's rivals for the leadership each reacted to the result. Andy Burnham said that Jeremy Corbyn was a politician with "very deep beliefs, very strong principles" which voters would embrace. Burnham later replaced Yvette Cooper as Shadow Home Secretary after she announced that she would not serve on a Labour frontbench led by Corbyn and that she would instead focus on playing a role in the upcoming EU membership referendum. Following the close of voting, Liz Kendall made a speech reflecting on her campaign stating that, after the New Labour government, there was never any debate in relation to the direction the party should go, and it had created a split "between the party and the country". All three of Corbyn's opponents in the leadership election stated they would support Corbyn, that the result should be accepted and the party should focus on attacking the Conservative government.

During the announcement of Corbyn's victory, Jamie Reed resigned as a Shadow Health Minister, citing his difference in opinion, with the new leader, over the replacement of the Trident missile system. Chris Leslie (Shadow Chancellor of the Exchequer), Yvette Cooper (Shadow Home Secretary), Chuka Umunna (Shadow Secretary of State for Business, Innovation and Skills), Rachel Reeves (Shadow Secretary of State for Work and Pensions), Emma Reynolds (Shadow Secretary of State for Communities and Local Government), Tristram Hunt (Shadow Secretary of State for Education), Mary Creagh (Shadow Secretary of State for International Development) and Liz Kendall (Shadow Minister for Care and Older People) also confirmed they would not serve in Corbyn's shadow cabinet.

In July 2026, Burnham succeeded Keir Starmer as Labour leader.

Conservative Party

David Cameron, then leader of the Conservative Party and Prime Minister, stated that Corbyn's win would make the Labour Party a threat "to our national security, to our economic security and to the security of your family". This echoed the same warning from other Cabinet ministers, including Michael Fallon, then Secretary of State for Defence, and from an email sent by Conservative Campaign Headquarters to party members. However Nick Hurd, former Minister for Civil Society, and Daniel Hannan, then MEP for South East England, both warned their party against "complacency". Ruth Davidson, then leader of the Scottish Conservative Party, said that the result demonstrated that Labour had given up on being in government, and that many Labour MPs would show "despair at his appointment".

UK Independence Party

Nigel Farage, then leader of the UK Independence Party, congratulated Corbyn but added his concerns about the new Labour leader's immigration policies. Before Corbyn's win, Farage stated that Corbyn's "sweeping emergence on the Left of British politics, where he has helped re-engage many who had given up on politics, is a good thing for our democracy".

Liberal Democrats

Tim Farron, then leader of the Liberal Democrats, commented on the "massive space in the centre ground of British politics" that had been opened up, due to the perceived shift leftwards by Labour, and suggested that the Liberal Democrats would be able to appeal more directly to "sensible, moderate, progressives who are opposed to what the Conservatives are doing, but cannot bring themselves to support a party of the hard left". The President of the Liberal Democrats, Sal Brinton, accused Labour of abdicating "its responsibilities" as a party of effective opposition. Willie Rennie, leader of the Scottish Liberal Democrats, said that Corbyn's success meant a "return to the damaging see saw politics of the past". Kirsty Williams, leader of the Welsh Liberal Democrats, attacked Corbyn as the "opposite of what this country needs", accusing Labour of returning to its 1970s policies.

Green Party of England and Wales

Natalie Bennett, then leader of the Green Party of England and Wales released a statement saying that her party would be "delighted" to work with Corbyn on a range of issues where they share common ground.

Scottish National Party

Nicola Sturgeon, leader of the Scottish National Party and First Minister of Scotland, congratulated Corbyn on winning the leadership contest but claimed that Labour's failure to defeat the Conservatives at the next general election would further the cause for Scottish independence and leave the SNP as the only real opposition.

Plaid Cymru

Leanne Wood, then leader of Plaid Cymru congratulated Corbyn and urged the Labour Party to join with her party's MPs in opposing "Tory policies that are causing great harm to people in Wales and beyond".

Social Democratic and Labour Party

Alasdair McDonnell, then leader of the Social Democratic and Labour Party commended Corbyn on an "incredible election campaign" and urged him to work towards returning Labour to an electable position, as well as opposing Conservative policies.

Ulster Unionist Party

Mike Nesbitt, then leader of the Ulster Unionist Party called on Corbyn to maintain Labour's policy towards Northern Ireland and "support agreements brought forward by the local parties".

=== International ===
- Argentina – Then President Cristina Fernández de Kirchner sent her congratulations to Corbyn, hailing him as "a great friend of Latin America".
- Greece – The country's governing party, Syriza, released a statement welcoming the election of Corbyn and arguing that the result would strengthen the "pan-European front against austerity".
- Ireland – Gerry Adams, the President of Sinn Féin, tweeted his words of congratulation to Corbyn.
- Russia – Alexander Yakovenko, the Russian Ambassador to the United Kingdom, said that he hoped that Corbyn's election would create a "positive change" in the debate around Russia–United Kingdom relations.
- Spain – Íñigo Errejón, the Political Secretary of Podemos, described the result as being part of a "wave of change" across Northern Europe.
- United States – U.S. Senator Bernie Sanders, a candidate for the Democratic Party's nomination for president in the 2016 U.S. presidential election, announced that he was "delighted to see that the British Labour Party has elected Jeremy Corbyn as its new leader." He added: "We need leadership in every country in the world which tells the billionaire class that they cannot have it all. We need economies that work for working families, not just the people on top."

== Analysis ==
Nobel prize-winning economist Paul Krugman said that it was not surprising that Jeremy Corbyn won the leadership contest, as all the candidates except for Corbyn essentially supported the Conservative government's austerity policies. As Krugman noted, not only the candidates but also the Labour moderates implicitly agreed with their opponents' idea that the government budget should always be balanced by the austerity policies. Krugman argued that it was a false claim that the Labour party, in power during 1997–2010, spent far beyond their means and caused a debt crisis.

Economist Joseph Stiglitz, also a Nobel prize winner, argued that the Labour party platform was different from what a leftist party must do, saying that Labour had not opposed austerity programmes. He added that Corbyn's camp offered a left-wing agenda and therefore Stiglitz was not surprised at all that Corbyn became the contender for the leadership contest.

== See also ==
- 2015 Labour Party deputy leadership election
- 2015 London Labour Party mayoral selection
- 2015 Scottish Labour leadership election
- 2015 Liberal Democrats leadership election
- 2016 Conservative Party leadership election
- 2016 Labour Party leadership election (UK)
- Political party affiliation in the United Kingdom
