= Rushanara Ali =

British politician (born 1975)

Rushanara Ali MP
- Official portrait, 2026

Parliamentary Under-Secretary of State for Homelessness and Democracy (Note: As Parliamentary Under-Secretary of State for Building Safety and Homelessness from 9 July to 18 October 2024)
- In office 9 July 2024 – 7 August 2025
- Prime Minister: Keir Starmer
- Preceded by: Lee Rowley (Building Safety); Felicity Buchan (Homelessness)
- Succeeded by: Alison McGovern (Minister of State for Local Government and Homelessness)

Member of Parliament for Bethnal Green and Stepney Bethnal Green and Bow (2010–2024)
- Incumbent
- Assumed office 6 May 2010
- Preceded by: George Galloway
- Majority: 1,689 (3.5%)
Shadow portfolios
2023–2024	Investment and Small Business
2013–2014	Further Education
2010–2013	International Development

Personal details
- Born: 14 March 1975 (age 51) Bishwanath, Sylhet, Bangladesh
- Party: Labour
- Education: St John's College, Oxford (BA)
- Website: rushanaraali.org

Rushanara Ali (/ˌruːʃəˈnɑːrə əˈliː/; Bengali: রুশনারা আলী, romanized: Ruśnara Ali, IPA: [ˈɾuʃnaˌɾa‿ˈali]; born 14 March 1975) is a British politician who has served as a Member of Parliament since 2010 and as Parliamentary Under-Secretary of State for Homelessness and Democracy from July 2024 to August 2025.

Ali was elected to represent Bethnal Green and Bow in 2010 as a member of Labour Party and represented the constituency until its abolition in 2024. She currently represents the Bethnal Green and Stepney constituency, having won it in the 2024 general election.

== Early life ==
Ali was born on 14 March 1975 in Bishwanath, Sylhet District, Bangladesh. With her family, Ali emigrated to the East End of London at the age of seven, where she attended Mulberry School for Girls and Tower Hamlets College. She grew up in Tower Hamlets, and was the first in her family to go to university, reading PPE at St John's College, Oxford.

== Early career ==
Ali began her career as a research assistant to Michael Young, working on a project which paved the way for the establishment of Tower Hamlets Summer University, offering independent learning programmes for young people aged 11–25. She helped to develop "Language Line", a national telephone interpreting service in over 100 languages. Between 1997 and 1999 she was parliamentary assistant to Oona King, MP for Bethnal Green and Bow.

Ali worked on human rights issues at the Foreign Office from 2000 to 2001. Prior to this, she was a research fellow at the Institute of Public Policy Research (IPPR) focussing on anti-discrimination issues from 1999 to 2002. From 2002 to 2005, she worked in the community cohesion unit at the Communities Directorate of the Home Office, leading a work programme to mobilise local and national agencies in the aftermath of the 2001 riots in Burnley, Bradford and Oldham, to prevent further conflict and unrest, challenging central Government to provide appropriate support to these areas.

Previously, Ali worked as associate director of the Young Foundation in Bethnal Green, a thinktank focused on social innovation. She has also served as Chair of Tower Hamlets Summer University; a commissioner on the London Child Poverty Commission; board member of Tower Hamlets College; Trustee of the Paul Hamlyn Foundation; and member of the Tate Britain Council.

Ali has published articles on a variety of political issues in numerous national and local media including The Guardian, Prospect magazine and Progress magazine. Ali has also appeared on Question Time Extra, BBC Radio 4's Woman's Hour and Thinking Allowed.

In March 2009, Ali was listed by The Guardian as one of the most powerful Muslim women in Britain.

== Parliamentary career ==
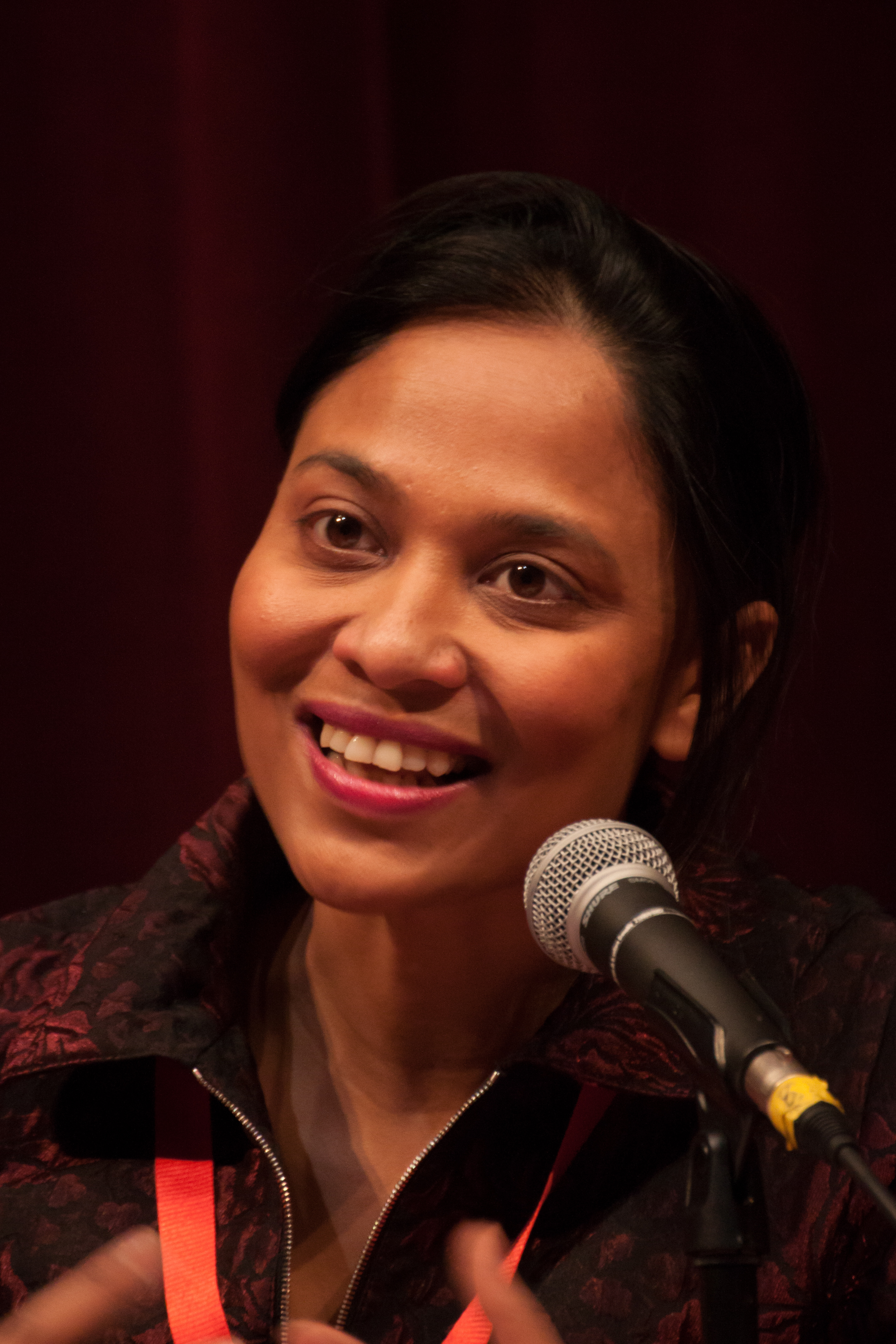
Ali at the Forum Libération de Grenoble in February 2013

In April 2007, Ali was chosen as the Labour Party's prospective Parliamentary candidate for Bethnal Green and Bow. In May 2010, she was elected as a Member of Parliament with a majority of 11,574 votes. She is the first person of Bangladeshi origin to have been elected to the House of Commons, and along with Shabana Mahmood and Yasmin Qureshi, became one of the United Kingdom's first female Muslim MPs.

In February 2013, Ali voted in favour of the Same Sex Marriage Bill. This drew support from pro-LGBT activists such as Peter Tatchell, but condemnation from religious figures such as the imams of mosques in Tooting and Bradford. She would later defend a constituent who alleged he was a victim of homophobic hate crime after his neighbours sang songs at him with the words "queer", "fairy" and "fag", calling for the case to be reconsidered in a letter to the Crown Prosecution Service.

In April 2013, Ali was appointed a Governor of the UK government-funded Westminster Foundation for Democracy.

Ali served as Shadow Minister of State for International Development from October 2010 to October 2013. In the October 2013 Labour frontbench reshuffle, Ali was appointed Shadow Minister of State for Education.

On 26 September 2014, she resigned from the Shadow Education team to abstain on the Coalition government's House of Commons motion permitting military action against Islamic State in Iraq.

Ali also told Miliband that she remained totally committed to his leadership and was looking forward to his becoming the prime minister in next eight months' time. In his return letter to Ali, Miliband praised her as 'someone with great ability and talent'. Regretting her departure from the frontbench team, the Labour leader added that he accepted the resignation with due respect to her decision.

Ali retained her seat at the 2015 general election, with a 61% share of the vote and her majority doubling to 24,317. In June 2015, she was one of 36 Labour MPs to nominate Jeremy Corbyn as a candidate in the Labour leadership election. Ali announced she would stand in the 2015 Labour Party deputy leadership election, but withdrew just before the nominations deadline.

In April 2016, British Prime Minister David Cameron appointed Ali as the Prime Ministerial Trade Envoy to Bangladesh, as part of cross-party trade envoy network. She supported Owen Smith in the failed attempt to replace Jeremy Corbyn in the 2016 leadership Election, calling on Corbyn to "do the decent thing" and quit as Labour leader.

Ali campaigned to remain in the European Union in the 2016 membership referendum and in 2017 voted against the triggering of Article 50.

In June 2017, in the general election, Ali retained her seat with an increased majority of 35,393.

In March 2018, Ali received a suspicious package containing an anti-Islamic letter and sticky liquid. The substance was later found to be harmless. Similar packages were received by fellow Labour MPs Mohammad Yasin, Rupa Huq and Afzal Khan.

In October 2018, Ali signed the 'MPs not border guards' pledge, committing to not report constituents to the Home Office for immigration enforcement.

As of 2019, Ali is part of the executive committee of the British-American Project. In December 2019, in the general election, Ali retained her seat with an increased majority of 37,524.

In early 2020, Ali supported Keir Starmer in the 2020 Labour Party leadership election.

In March 2020, Ali was one of 76 Labour MPs to urge that the government grant recourse to public funds for all migrants in the UK regardless of their legal status.

In March 2021, a 42-year-old man was sentenced after orchestrating an 18-month hate campaign against Ali which included death threats.

In November 2022, as a serving MP, Ali received £10,000 for 32 hours of work to represent a privately funded "Commission of Inquiry" to investigate the Kazakhstan Government and the detention of Zhanbolat Mamay. In a press conference on 20 January 2023, Bindmans LLP, the project manager, refused to disclose the name of their client but revealed it was a Kazakhstan citizen or citizens.

In the September 2023 British shadow cabinet reshuffle, she was appointed Shadow Minister for Investment and Small Business.

During the Gaza war, Ali faced significant criticism from some constituents for following the Labour Party whip and abstaining on the SNP’s ceasefire motion. Ali had previously called for a humanitarian ceasefire and continued to call for a ceasefire into 2024.

Ali is a member of Labour Friends of Palestine and the Middle East.

During the 2024 general election, she saw her 37,000-majority reduced to 1,700, and thus only narrowly avoided losing her seat to independent candidate Ajmal Masroor. Death threats and voter intimidation left Ali needing police protection during her re-election campaign.

=== Ministerial career (2024–2025) ===
Following Labour's victory in the 2024 general election, Ali was appointed Parliamentary Under-Secretary of State for Building Safety and Homelessness in the Starmer ministry.

On 19 October 2024, Ali relinquished her portfolio of Building Safety after survivors of the Grenfell Tower fire called for her resignation due to Ali previously attending a conference sponsored by Saint-Gobain, one of the firms heavily criticised in the Grenfell Tower Inquiry, when serving as Shadow Minister for Investment and Small Business. She retained her ministerial role in the department with responsibility for homelessness and rough sleeping, as well as taking on the role as Minister for Democracy.

==== Resignation ====
On 7 August 2025, she faced strong criticism after it had been reported that she evicted tenants from her property in Bow whilst serving as the minister for homelessness, but a few weeks later raised rent prices after failing to resell the property. Ali's letting agencies also attempted to charge tenants for repainting and professional cleaning, contrary to the Tenant Fees Act 2019. Ali had introduced the Renters' Rights Bill to ban landlords from relisting vacant properties at higher rates, prompting accusations of hypocrisy. She resigned the same day. In her resignation letter, Ali claimed there was no wrongdoing but stated she had become a "distraction" for the government.

=== Post-Ministerial career (since 2025) ===
In March 2026, Ali joined MPs calling for a ban on political donations in cryptocurrency, citing "the threat of foreign interference in our democracy".

== See also ==
- List of British Bangladeshis
- Lists of ethnic minority politicians in the United Kingdom

== Notes ==
Parliament of the United Kingdom
Preceded by George Galloway	Member of Parliament for Bethnal Green and Bow; 2010–2024	Constituency abolished
New constituency	Member of Parliament for Bethnal Green and Stepney; 2024–present	Incumbent
