= Matthew Pennycook =

British politician (born 1982)

The Right Honourable Matthew Pennycook MP
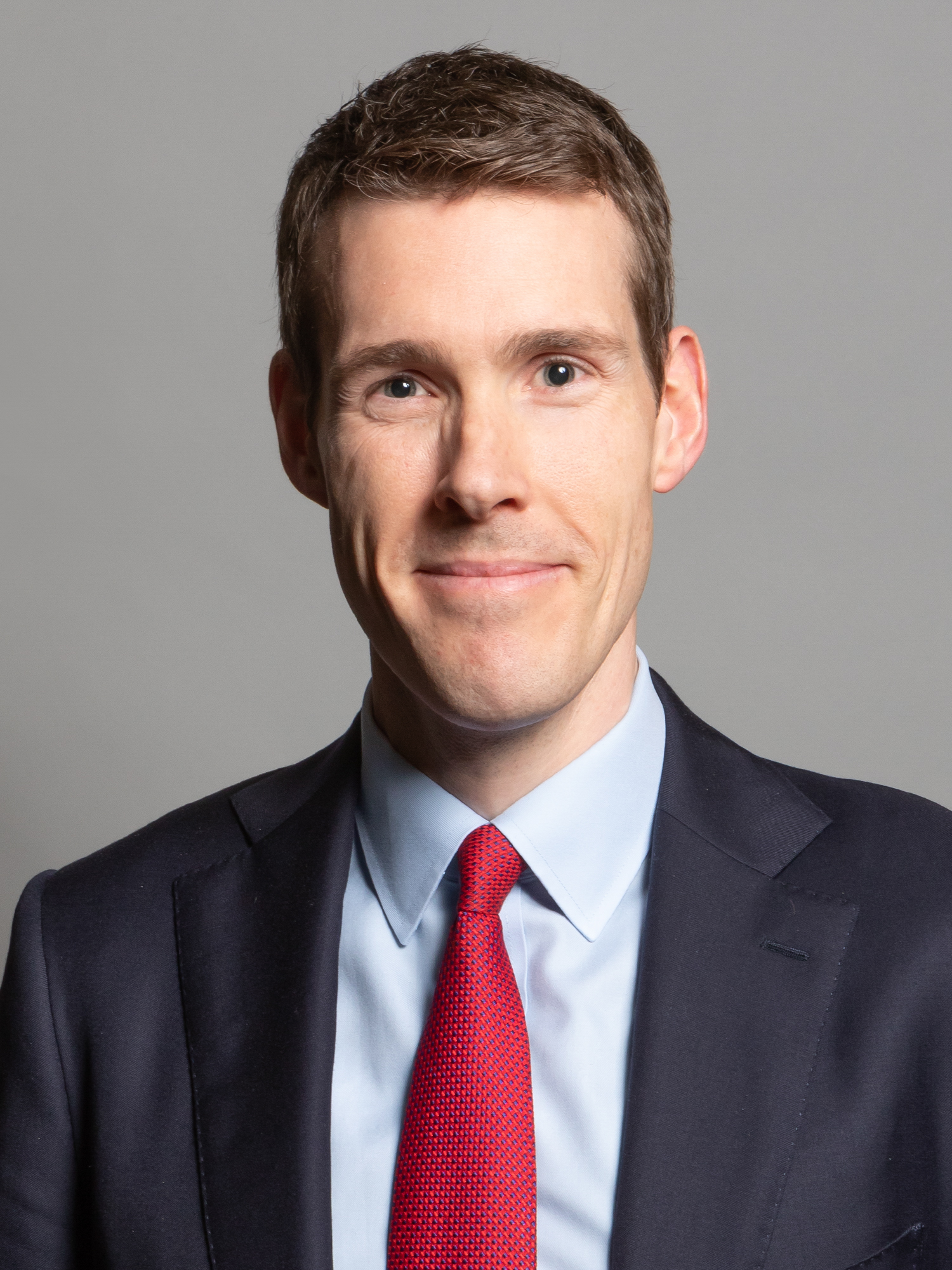
- Official portrait, 2020

Minister of State for Housing and Planning
- Incumbent
- Assumed office 6 July 2024
- Prime Minister: Keir Starmer; Andy Burnham
- Preceded by: Felicity Buchan (Housing); Lee Rowley (Planning)
Shadow portfolios
2021–2024	Housing and Planning
2020–2021	Climate Change
2016–2019	Exiting the EU

Member of Parliament for Greenwich and Woolwich
- Incumbent
- Assumed office 7 May 2015
- Preceded by: Nick Raynsford
- Majority: 18,366 (43.0%)

Personal details
- Born: Matthew Thomas Pennycook; 29 October 1982 (age 43) Hammersmith, London, England
- Party: Labour
- Spouse: Joanna Otterburn
- Children: 2
- Education: London School of Economics (BA); Balliol College, Oxford (MPhil)
- Website: matthewpennycook.com

Matthew Thomas Pennycook (born 29 October 1982) is a British politician who has served as Minister of State for Housing and Planning since 2024. A member of the Labour Party, he has been the Member of Parliament (MP) for Greenwich and Woolwich since 2015.

== Early life and education ==
Matthew Pennycook was born on 29 October 1982 in Hammersmith, and was raised in a single-parent family in south London. He was educated at Beverley Boys Secondary School, a comprehensive school in New Malden, London. He joined the Labour Party at the age of nineteen.

Pennycook studied History and International Relations at the London School of Economics and Political Science, graduating with a first-class Bachelor of Arts (BA) degree in 2005. He was awarded the CS MacTaggart Scholarship Prize for the best overall degree performance in any subject. He subsequently won a scholarship to attend Balliol College, Oxford, studying for a Master of Philosophy (MPhil) degree in International Relations.

== Political career ==
While still a student, he volunteered with the Child Poverty Action Group and worked with then-Chief Executive, Kate Green, who later became a Labour MP. Before becoming an MP himself, Pennycook worked for a number of charitable and voluntary organisations including the Fair Pay Network and the Resolution Foundation, where he led on issues relating to welfare reform, low pay and working poverty. He also worked for a while in Parliament as an assistant to Labour MP Karen Buck.

Pennycook was a Labour councillor for Greenwich West from 2010 to 2015, resigning in March 2015 just before the general election. He also served as a trustee of Greenwich Housing Rights and was a school governor at James Wolfe Primary School in West Greenwich. He has written multiple articles for The Guardian about the need for a living wage in the UK and has served on the Living Wage Foundation's advisory board.

== Parliamentary career ==
=== Early career (2015–2016) ===
In November 2013, he was selected as the official Labour Party candidate for Greenwich and Woolwich, as the sitting MP, Nick Raynsford, was retiring.

At the 2015 general election, Pennycook was elected as MP for Greenwich and Woolwich with a majority of 11,946 votes and a 52.2% share of the vote on a turnout of 63.7%. Pennycook gave his maiden speech in the House of Commons during a debate on the economy on 4 June 2015.

Following Labour's defeat at the 2015 general election, Pennycook endorsed Yvette Cooper in the subsequent leadership election and Tom Watson for the deputy leadership . He supported Sadiq Khan in the campaign for selection of the candidate for the 2016 London mayoral election.

In July 2015, Pennycook became a member of the Energy and Climate Change Select Committee. He served as Parliamentary Private Secretary to Shadow Minister of State for Housing, John Healey MP from 2015, resigning from the position in June 2016.

He was one of 161 Labour MPs who backed Owen Smith in his unsuccessful Labour Party leadership campaign to replace Jeremy Corbyn in September 2016.

=== Frontbench (2016–2019) ===
Pennycook campaigned in favour of a "Remain" vote for the 2016 referendum on EU membership and his Greenwich and Woolwich constituency voted 64% to remain. After the referendum results were announced, Pennycook was appointed one of the Shadow Ministers for Brexit in October 2016, and, in accordance with the Labour Party whip, voted for the Bill to trigger Article 50.

At the snap 2017 general election, Pennycook was re-elected as MP for Greenwich and Woolwich with an increased vote share of 64.4% and an increased majority of 20,714.

In October 2018, Pennycook expressed concerns about newly qualified teachers leaving the profession, citing issues such as stagnant pay, rising living costs and a lack of affordable housing to rent and buy.

In September 2019, he resigned as shadow Brexit minister to campaign actively in favour of holding a second referendum and unequivocally for the UK to stay in the EU.

=== Backbenches and return to frontbench (2019–2024) ===
At the 2019 general election, Pennycook was again re-elected, seeing his share of the vote decrease to 56.8% and his majority reduced to 18,464.

Following Keir Starmer's victory in the 2020 Labour Party leadership election, Pennycook returned to the Opposition frontbench as Shadow Minister for Climate Change. In the December 2021 frontbench reshuffle, Pennycook was appointed Shadow Minister for Housing and Planning.

=== Ministerial career (2024–present) ===
At the 2024 general election, Pennycook was again re-elected, with an increased vote share (compared with the notional 2019 result) of 56.2% and a decreased majority of 18,366 (though an increase compared with the notional 2019 result).

On 6 July 2024, he was appointed as Minister of State at the Ministry of Housing, Communities and Local Government (until 8 July 2024, the Department for Levelling Up, Housing and Communities), working under Secretary of State Angela Rayner. Compared to other Labour ministers, he was recognised as having good experience in the housing sector, having tabled numerous amendments to the Renters (Reform) Bill during the previous Parliament.

On 20 July 2026, Pennycook was reappointed under Andy Burnham and invited to attend cabinet in the role.

== Personal life ==
Pennycook is married to civil servant Joanna Otterburn and they have two children. Pennycook is a supporter of Charlton Athletic and a member of the Charlton Athletic Supporters' Trust.

== Political views ==
In May 2021, Pennycook announced his opposition to a 1,500-home development project in his constituency over concerns about the height of its planned high rises.

In March 2022, Pennycook argued that housing supply is not a "panacea for affordability".

== Honours ==
On 21 July 2026, Pennycook was affirmed into the Privy Council, entitling him to the honorific style "The Right Honourable" for life.

Parliament of the United Kingdom
Preceded by Nick Raynsford	Member of Parliament for Greenwich and Woolwich; 2015–present	Incumbent
