= 2015 Labour Party deputy leadership election =

British Labour Party deputy leadership election

- 14 August – 12 September 2015
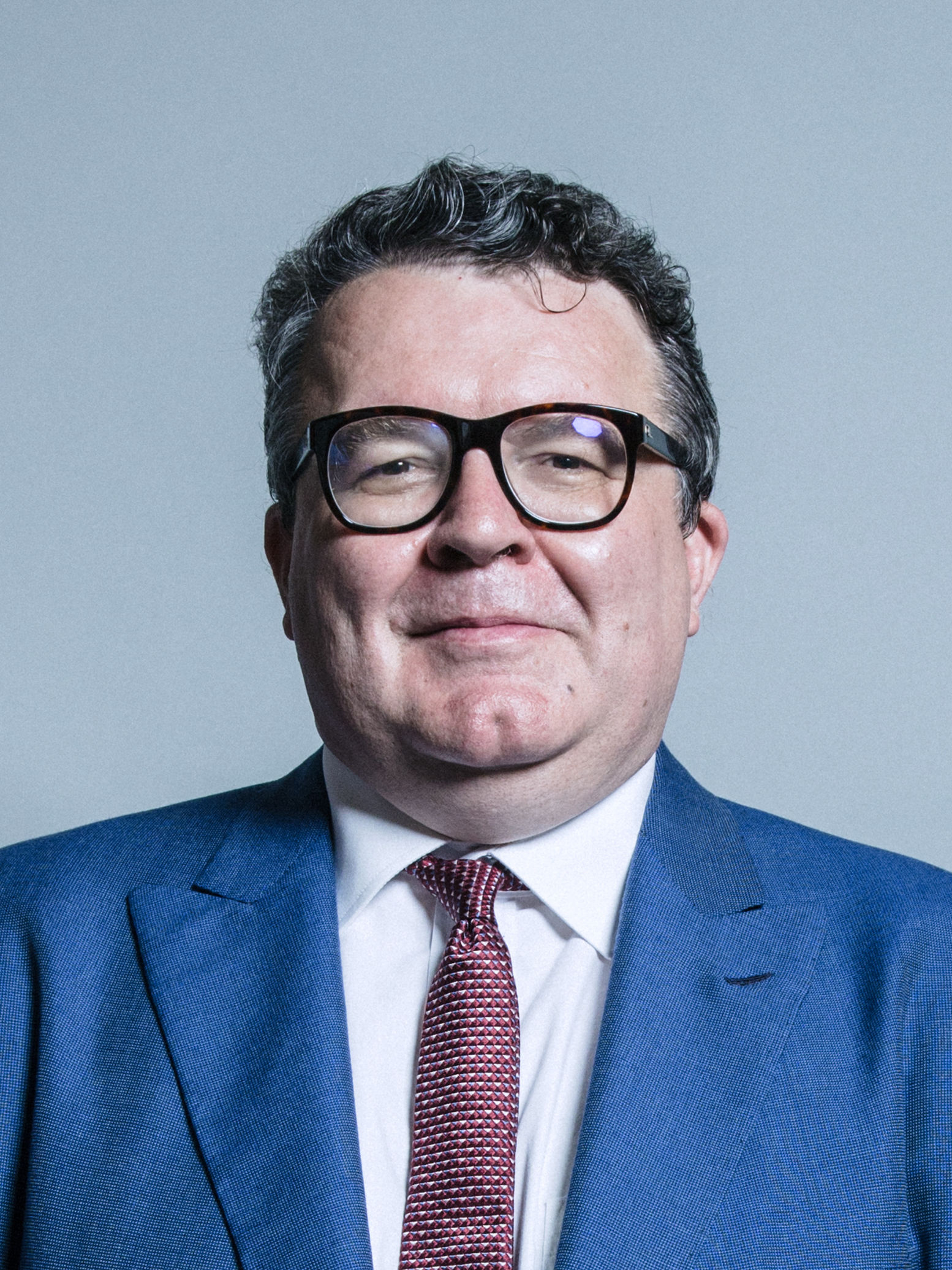

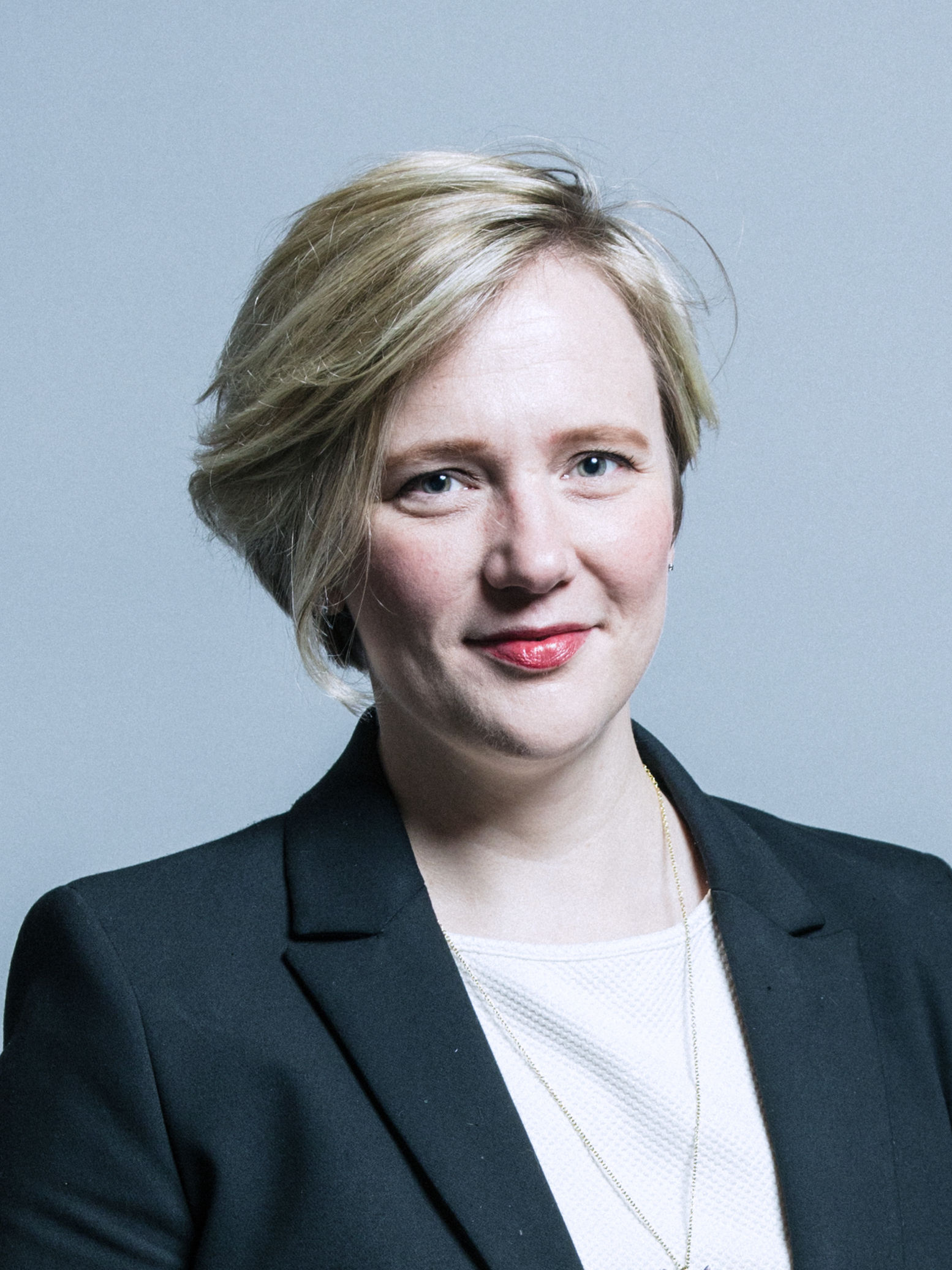

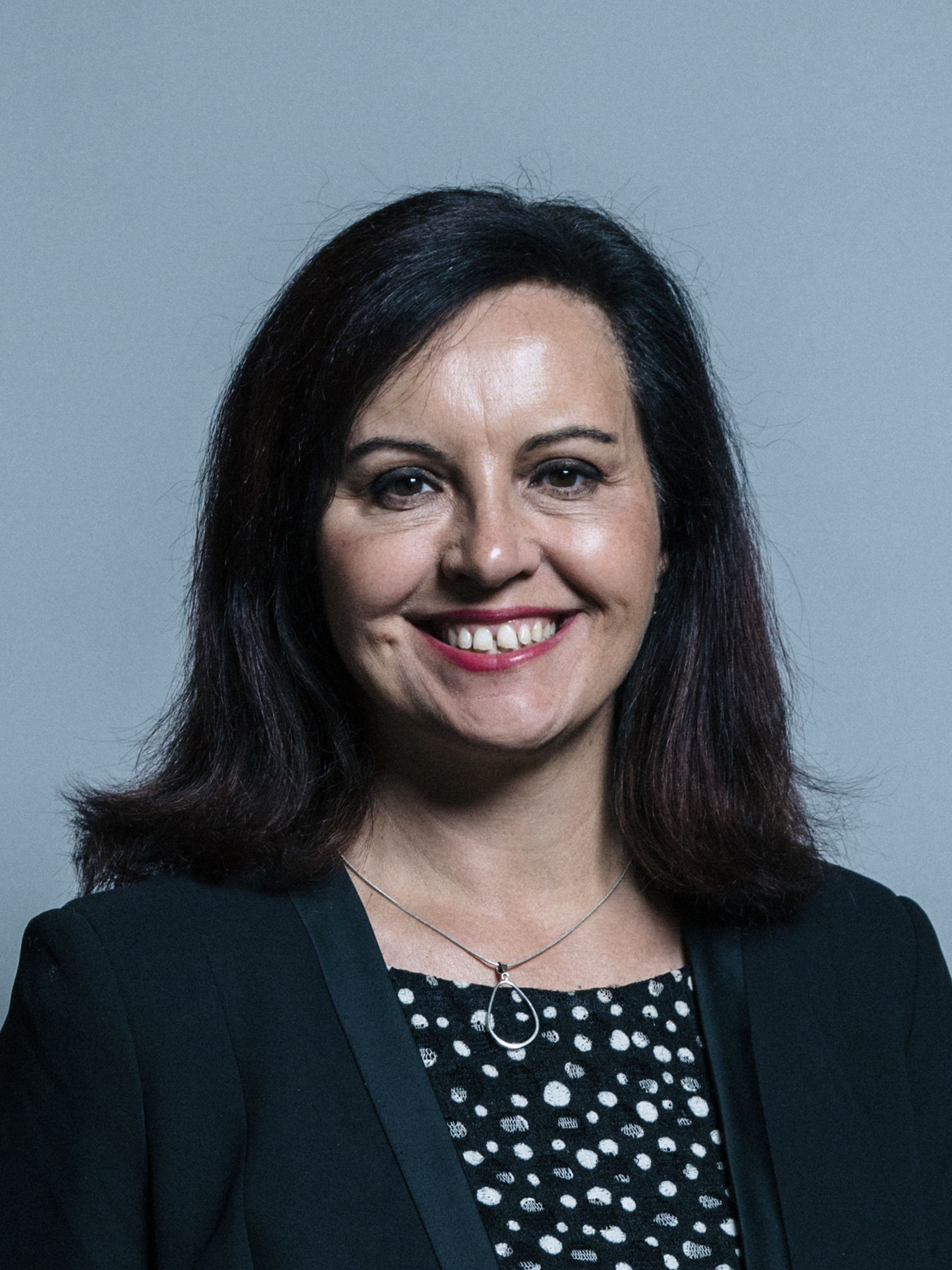

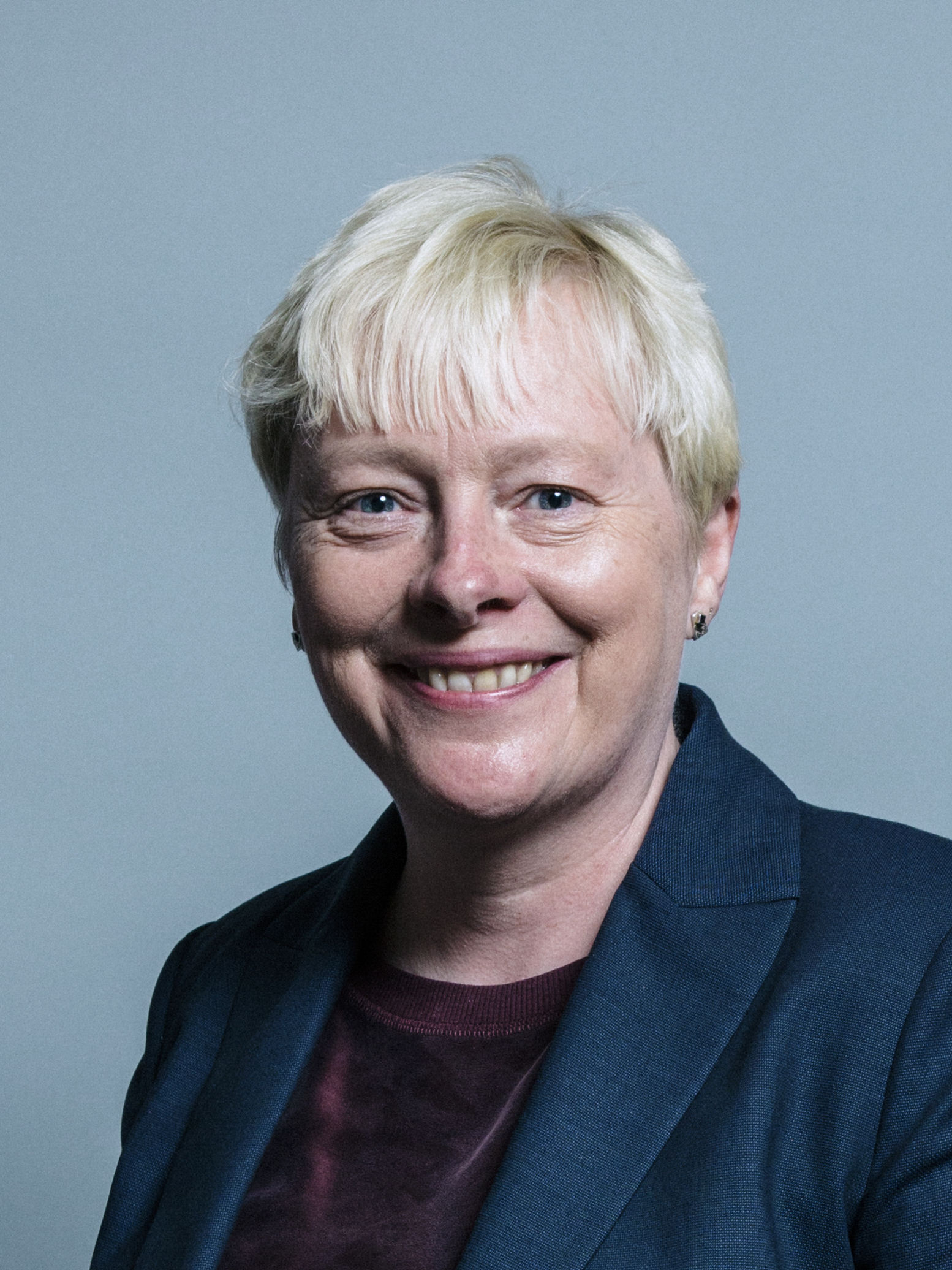

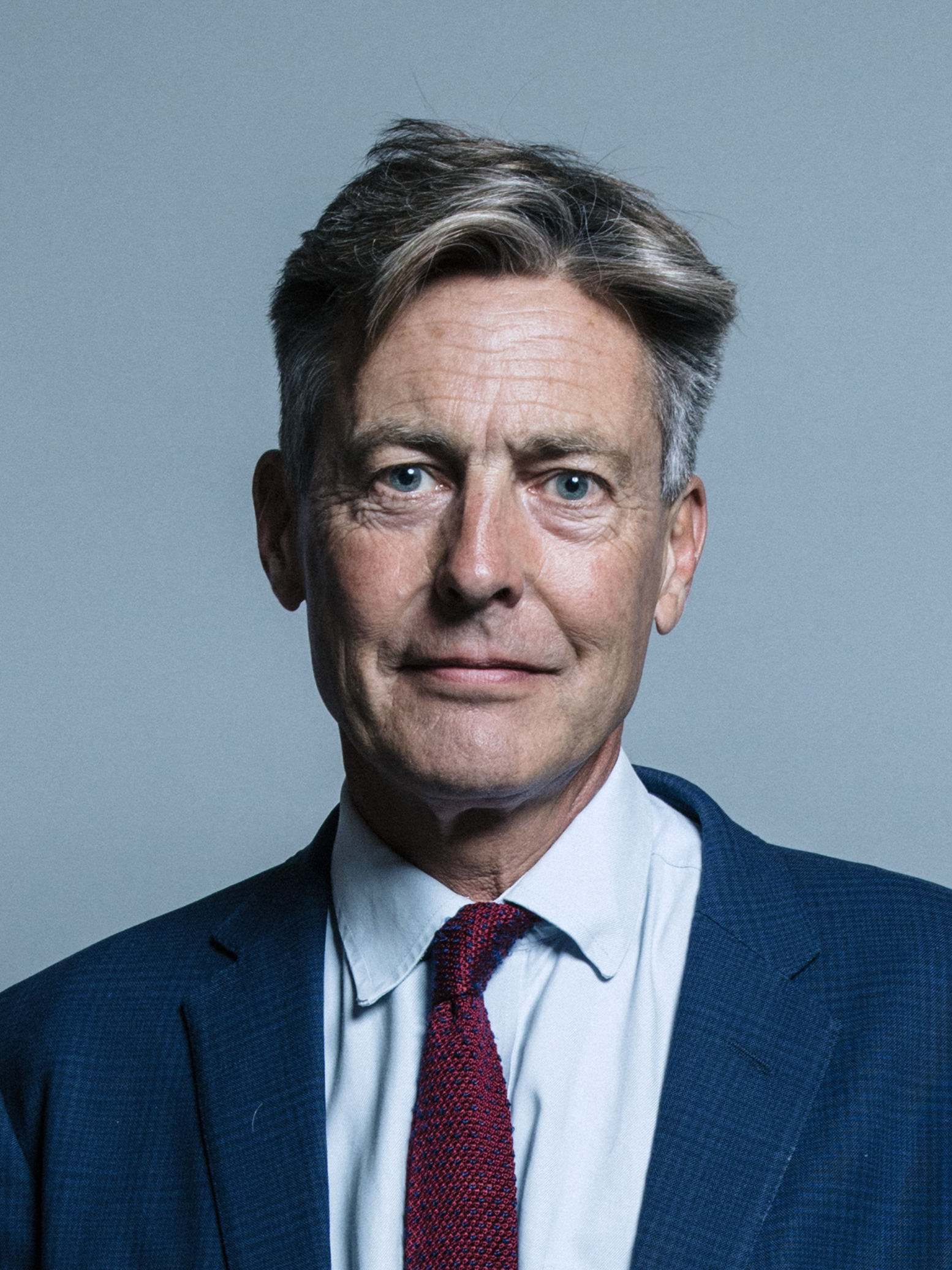
Candidate	Tom Watson	Stella Creasy	Caroline Flint
First pref.	160,852 (39.4%)	78,100 (19.1%)	64,425 (15.8%)
Final round	198,962 (50.7%)	103,746 (26.4%)	89,538 (22.8%)
Candidate	Angela Eagle	Ben Bradshaw
First pref.	66,013 (16.2%)	39,080 (9.6%)
Final round	—	—
Deputy Leader before election
Harriet Harman
Elected Deputy Leader
Tom Watson

The 2015 Labour Party deputy leadership election was triggered on 8 May 2015 by the resignation of Harriet Harman as Deputy Leader of the Labour Party of the United Kingdom following the party's defeat at the 2015 General Election. Harman, the Deputy Leader of the Labour Party, became Acting Leader following Leader Ed Miliband's resignation. Harman announced on the same day that she would step down as Deputy Leader, with her resignation taking effect when the new Leader and Deputy Leader are elected.

Five candidates were successfully nominated to stand in the deputy leadership election: Ben Bradshaw, Stella Creasy, Angela Eagle, Caroline Flint, and Tom Watson. The voting process began on Friday 14 August 2015 and closed on Thursday 10 September 2015, with the results being announced on Saturday 12 September 2015. Voting was by Labour Party members and registered and affiliated supporters, using the alternative vote system.

Tom Watson was elected deputy leader with 50.7% of the vote on the third ballot. Coterminous with the deputy leadership election, in the 2015 Labour Party leadership election, Jeremy Corbyn was elected as leader.

== Procedure ==
The leadership election, triggered by Harman's resignation, took place under the reformed rules adopted from the proposals of the February 2014 Collins Report, which was led by Ray Collins. The plan entailed a shorter election than the one that took place in 2010, with a new deputy leader in place before Labour's party conference in September 2015.

The review changed the way in which Labour elects leaders. Under the former system, a three-way electoral college chose the leader, with one-third weight given to the votes of the Parliamentary Labour Party (i.e. Labour members of the House of Commons) and Labour members of the European Parliament; one-third to individual Labour Party members, and one third to the trade union and affiliated societies sections. Ed Miliband famously won following a large victory in the third of these colleges.

Following the Collins review, this system was replaced by a "one member, one vote" (OMOV) system. Candidates were elected by members and registered and affiliated supporters, who all received a maximum of one vote. This meant that, for example, members of Labour-affiliated trade unions needed to register as Labour supporters in order to vote.

In order to stand, candidates needed to have been nominated by at least 15% of the Parliamentary Labour Party (PLP) – 35 MPs. The vote, as in previous elections, was held by the alternative vote (instant-runoff) system. The leadership election was held under the same rules.

A meeting of Labour's National Executive Committee took place on 13 May 2015 to set a timetable and procedure for the two elections.

- Tuesday 9 June 2015 – Nominations open
- Monday 15 June 2015 (12:00) – Nominations for the Leader close
- Wednesday 17 June 2015 (12:00) – Nominations for the Deputy Leader close
- Wednesday 17 June 2015 (12:00) – Hustings period open
- Friday 31 July 2015 (12:00) – Supporting nominations close
- Wednesday 12 August 2015 (12:00) – Last date to join as member, affiliated support or registered supporter and be able to vote
- Friday 14 August 2015 – Ballot papers sent out
- Thursday 10 September 2015 (12:00) – Ballot closes
- Saturday 12 September 2015 – Special Conference announce the results

== Candidates for Deputy Leader ==
=== Declared ===
- Ben Bradshaw, former Shadow Secretary of State for Culture, Media and Sport, former Secretary of State for Culture, Media and Sport and MP for Exeter
- Stella Creasy, Shadow Business Minister and MP for Walthamstow
- Angela Eagle, Shadow Leader of the House of Commons, former Exchequer Secretary to the Treasury and MP for Wallasey
- Caroline Flint, Shadow Secretary of State for Energy and Climate Change, former Minister of State for Europe and MP for Don Valley
- Tom Watson, former Deputy Chair of the Labour Party, former Parliamentary secretary for the Cabinet Office and MP for West Bromwich East

=== Withdrawn ===
- John Healey, former Shadow Secretary of State for Health, former Minister of State for Housing and Planning and MP for Wentworth and Dearne
- Rushanara Ali, former Shadow Minister for Education and MP for Bethnal Green and Bow

=== Declined ===
- Simon Danczuk, MP for Rochdale (endorsed Caroline Flint)
- Gloria De Piero, Shadow Minister for Women and Equalities and MP for Ashfield (endorsed Tom Watson)

Flint was viewed as a Blairite, while Watson was viewed as having close links to the trade unions. One party source was anonymously quoted in the Financial Times as comparing a potential contest between Flint and Watson to the hotly contested 1981 deputy leadership election between Denis Healey and the leftist Tony Benn.

== MP nominations for candidates ==
To be placed on the ballot, candidates for deputy leader must have obtained the nominations of 35 MPs. The number of MPs next to the candidate's name includes the actual candidate too, as they can count as one of the 35 MPs needed. Members with bold numbers succeeded to get the 35 nominations needed to make the ballot. Nominations for candidates by MPs were:

- Tom Watson (62): Dave Anderson, Jonathan Ashworth, Ian Austin, Adrian Bailey, Kevin Brennan, Richard Burden, Richard Burgon, Liam Byrne, Ronnie Campbell, Vernon Coaker, David Crausby, Jon Cruddas, Judith Cummins, Jim Cunningham, Gloria De Piero, Michael Dugher, Paul Farrelly, Rob Flello, Colleen Fletcher, Vicky Foxcroft, Roger Godsiff, Louise Haigh, Harry Harpham, Sue Hayman, Stephen Hepburn, Imran Hussain, Kevan Jones, Helen Jones, Barbara Keeley, Ian Lavery, Emma Lewell-Buck, Clive Lewis, Rebecca Long-Bailey, Ian Lucas, Justin Madders, Khalid Mahmood, Shabana Mahmood, Rob Marris, Chris Matheson, Stephen McCabe, Andy McDonald, Conor McGinn, Alan Meale, Ian Mearns, Grahame Morris, Lisa Nandy, Kate Osamor, Jess Phillips, Lucy Powell, Rachel Reeves, Geoffrey Robinson, Naz Shah, Virendra Sharma, Dennis Skinner, Ruth Smeeth, Jeff Smith, Nick Smith, John Spellar, Jo Stevens, David Winnick, Iain Wright
- Caroline Flint (43): Kevin Barron, Hilary Benn, Luciana Berger, Tom Blenkinsop, Ann Coffey, Alex Cunningham, Nic Dakin, Simon Danczuk, Wayne David, Jim Dowd, Peter Dowd, Jack Dromey, Julie Elliott, Jim Fitzpatrick, Yvonne Fovargue, Barry Gardiner, Mary Glindon, David Hanson, Carolyn Harris, Margaret Hodge, Kate Hoey, George Howarth, Graham Jones, Gerald Kaufman, Stephen Kinnock, Siobhain McDonagh, Pat McFadden, Jessica Morden, Albert Owen, Toby Perkins, Jonathan Reynolds, Emma Reynolds, Joan Ryan, Barry Sheerman, Owen Smith, Angela Smith, Gisela Stuart, Nick Thomas-Symonds, Anna Turley, Karl Turner, Alan Whitehead, Phil Wilson
- Angela Eagle (38): Margaret Beckett, Roberta Blackman-Woods, Paul Blomfield, Nick Brown, Dawn Butler, Ann Clwyd, Julie Cooper, Maria Eagle, Bill Esterson, Mike Gapes, Pat Glass, Lilian Greenwood, Margaret Greenwood, Nia Griffith, Andrew Gwynne, John Healey, Mark Hendrick, Sharon Hodgson, Kelvin Hopkins, Seema Malhotra, Rachael Maskell, John McDonnell, Alison McGovern, Liz McInnes, Michael Meacher, Teresa Pearce, Stephen Pound, Angela Rayner, Christina Rees, Marie Rimmer, Steve Rotheram, Tulip Siddiq, Cat Smith, Jon Trickett, Derek Twigg, Keith Vaz, Daniel Zeichner
- Ben Bradshaw (37): Heidi Alexander, Rushanara Ali, Clive Betts, Lyn Brown, Chris Bryant, Karen Buck, Neil Coyle, Geraint Davies, Thangam Debbonaire, Clive Efford, Chris Evans, Frank Field, Paul Flynn, Helen Goodman, Fabian Hamilton, Meg Hillier, Tristram Hunt, Rupa Huq, Huw Irranca-Davies, Alan Johnson, Diana Johnson, Susan Elan Jones, Sadiq Khan, Peter Kyle, Gordon Marsden, Kerry McCarthy, Catherine McKinnell, Matthew Pennycook, Bridget Phillipson, Yasmin Qureshi, Andy Slaughter, Andrew Smith, Keir Starmer, Emily Thornberry, Stephen Timms, Valerie Vaz
- Stella Creasy (35): Diane Abbott, Debbie Abrahams, Ruth Cadbury, Sarah Champion, Jenny Chapman, Jo Cox, Stephen Doughty, Louise Ellman, Kate Green, Helen Hayes, Kate Hollern, Dan Jarvis, Gerald Jones, Mike Kane, David Lammy, Chris Leslie, Ivan Lewis, Holly Lynch, Fiona Mactaggart, Madeleine Moon, Ian Murray, Melanie Onn, Chi Onwurah, Jamie Reed, Steve Reed, Gavin Shuker, Karin Smyth, Wes Streeting, Graham Stringer, Gareth Thomas, Stephen Twigg, Chuka Umunna, Catherine West, John Woodcock

Before dropping out of the race on 17 June, Rushanara Ali had the following 24 nominations: Roberta Blackman-Woods, Paul Blomfield, Lyn Brown, Dawn Butler, Julie Cooper, Jeremy Corbyn, Clive Efford, Fabian Hamilton, Helen Hayes, Tristram Hunt, Rupa Huq, Sadiq Khan, Seema Malhotra, John Mann, John McDonnell, Chi Onwurah, Teresa Pearce, Matthew Pennycook, Yasmin Qureshi, Dennis Skinner, Andy Slaughter, Keir Starmer, Chuka Umunna

Before dropping out of the race on 11 June, John Healey had the following 20 nominations: Sarah Champion, Clive Efford, Holly Lynch, Kevin Barron, Andy Slaughter, Clive Betts, Ruth Cadbury, Simon Danczuk, Louise Ellman, Fabian Hamilton, Harry Harpham, Madeleine Moon, Paula Sherriff, Derek Twigg, Paul Blomfield, Ivan Lewis, Gordon Marsden, Chris Leslie, Teresa Pearce

== Opinion polling ==
YouGov/The Times, 17–21 July 2015, 1,054 eligible voters (Note: Labour Party members, registered supporters and signed up trade unionists who are eligible to vote in the leadership election)
Candidate	First Round	Second Round	Third Round
Tom Watson	41%	46%	50%
Stella Creasy	21%	22%	26%
Caroline Flint	17%	19%	23%
Ben Bradshaw	11%	13%	—
Angela Eagle	10%	—	—

== Result ==
First round
Candidate	Party members		Registered supporters		Affiliated supporters		Total	
Candidate	Votes	%	Votes	%	Votes	%	Votes	%
Tom Watson	90,018	37.5	43,729	43.7	27,105	39.6	160,852	39.4
Stella Creasy	47,372	19.7	22,465	22.5	8,263	12.1	78,100	19.1
Angela Eagle	36,321	15.1	15,676	15.7	14,016	20.5	66,013	16.2
Caroline Flint	41,504	17.3	11,282	11.3	11,639	17.0	64,425	15.8
Ben Bradshaw	24,738	10.3	6,839	6.8	7,503	10.9	39,080	9.6

Second round
Candidate	Party members		Registered supporters		Affiliated supporters		Total	
Candidate	Votes	%	Votes	%	Votes	%	Votes	%
Tom Watson	96,008	40.4	45,329	45.9	29,252	43.2	170,589	42.2
Stella Creasy	52,866	22.2	23,959	24.2	9,730	14.4	86,555	21.4
Caroline Flint	48,208	20.3	12,948	13.1	13,425	19.8	74,581	18.4
Angela Eagle	40,559	17.1	16,583	16.8	15,375	22.7	72,517	17.9

Third round
Candidate	Party members		Registered supporters		Affiliated supporters		Total	
Candidate	Votes	%	Votes	%	Votes	%	Votes	%
Tom Watson ✓	111,465	48.1	51,815	54.5	35,682	54.5	198,962	50.7
Stella Creasy	62,875	27.1	27,874	29.3	12,997	19.8	103,746	26.4
Caroline Flint	57,305	24.7	15,434	16.2	16,799	25.7	89,538	22.8

== See also ==
- 2015 Labour Party leadership election (UK)
- 2015 Scottish Labour leadership election
- 2015 Liberal Democrats leadership election
