= Stella Creasy =

British politician (born 1977)

Stella Creasy MP
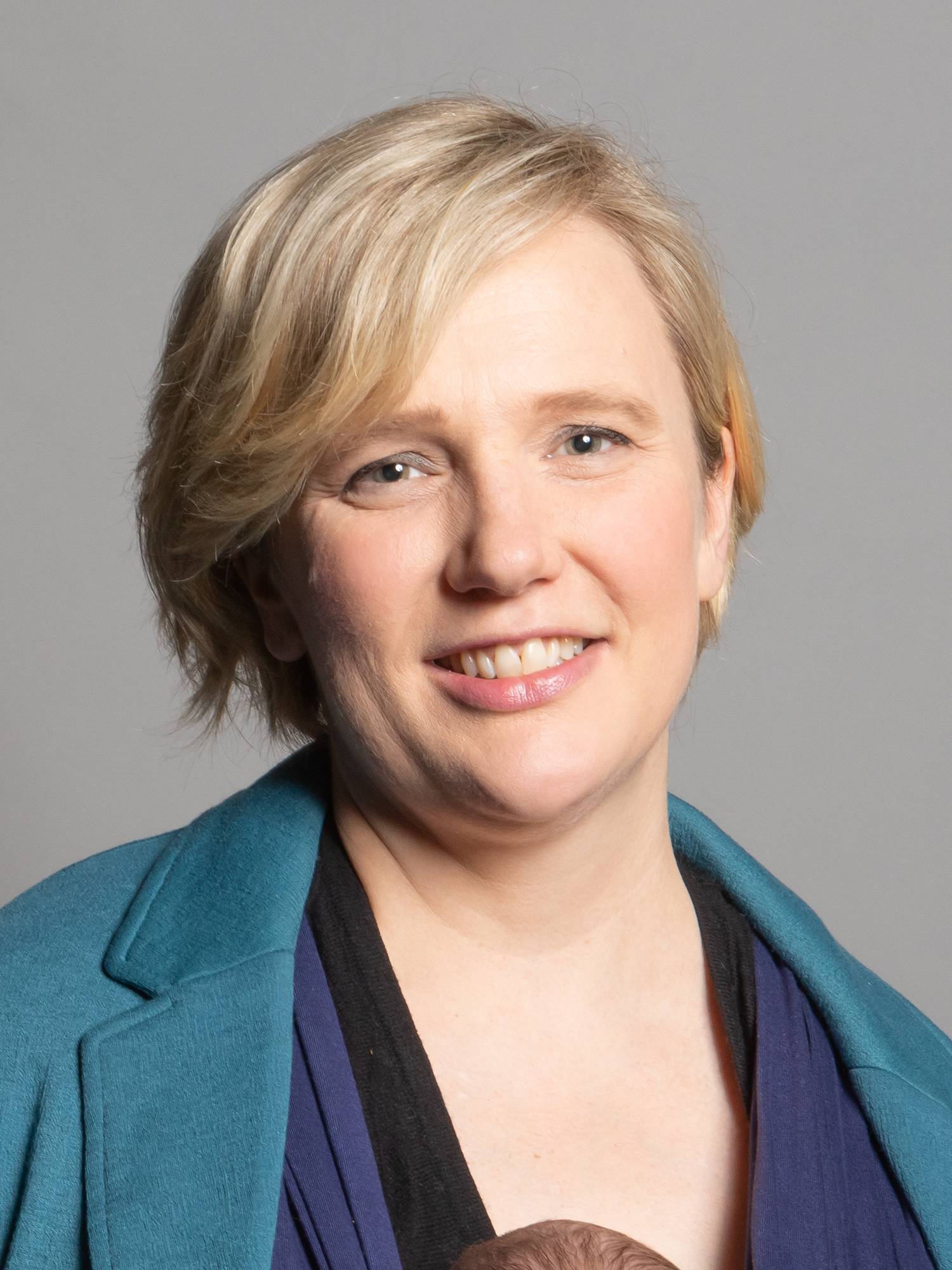
- Official portrait, 2020

Shadow Minister for Business, Innovation and Skills
- In office 8 October 2013 – 18 September 2015
- Leader: Ed Miliband; Harriet Harman (acting)
- Preceded by: Shabana Mahmood
- Succeeded by: Chi Onwurah

Shadow Minister for Crime Prevention
- In office 7 October 2011 – 8 October 2013
- Leader: Ed Miliband
- Preceded by: Position established
- Succeeded by: Jack Dromey

Member of Parliament for Walthamstow
- Incumbent
- Assumed office 6 May 2010
- Preceded by: Neil Gerrard
- Majority: 17,996 (39.3%)

Mayor of Waltham Forest
- In office May 2002 – May 2003
- Preceded by: Muhammed Fazlur Rahman
- Succeeded by: Robert Belam

Member of the Waltham Forest Council for Lea Bridge
- In office 2 May 2002 – 4 May 2006
- Preceded by: Roberto Bruni
- Succeeded by: Afzal Akram

Personal details
- Born: Stella Judith Creasy; 5 April 1977 (age 49) Sutton Coldfield, West Midlands, England
- Party: Labour and Co-operative
- Domestic partner: Dan Fox
- Children: 2
- Education: Magdalene College, Cambridge (BA); London School of Economics (PhD)
- Website: Official website

Academic background
- Thesis: Understanding the Lifeworld of Social Exclusion (2006)

Stella Judith Creasy (born 5 April 1977) is a British Labour and Co-operative politician who has been Member of Parliament (MP) for Walthamstow since 2010.

She served in the frontbench teams of Ed Miliband and Harriet Harman from 2011 to 2015. Following the Labour Party's defeat at the 2015 general election, Creasy stood in the Labour Party deputy leadership election, finishing second to Tom Watson. She was a vocal critic of former Labour leader Jeremy Corbyn and supported Owen Smith in the failed attempt to replace him in the 2016 leadership election.

== Early life and career ==
Stella Creasy was born on 5 April 1977 in Sutton Coldfield, and is the daughter of Corinna Frances Avril (née Martin) and Philip Charles Creasy; her father is a trained opera singer and her mother a headteacher of a special needs school. Her elder brother, Matthew Creasy, born in 1974, is an academic. Creasy's mother described her own parents as "very aristocratic" and herself as "enormously privileged", which contributed to Corinna Martin's decision to join the Labour Party.

After spending her early childhood in the Manchester suburb of Didsbury, Creasy's family moved to Colchester, where she attended Colchester County High School for Girls, a grammar school. Although she initially failed the eleven-plus exam, Creasy's family's move south gave her a second chance. She then attended Magdalene College, Cambridge, where she read Social and Political Sciences before earning a PhD at the London School of Economics (LSE) with a thesis titled "Understanding the lifeworld of social exclusion". In the 1990s, towards the end of John Major's period as prime minister, Creasy was an intern at the Fabian Society.

Creasy was deputy director of the Involve think tank, and worked as a researcher and speech writer for various Labour government ministers, including Douglas Alexander, Charles Clarke and Ross Cranston. She then became head of public affairs at the Scout Association. In 2006, having already started work as a parliamentary researcher, she completed her thesis, receiving a doctorate in Social Psychology from LSE. Creasy received a Titmuss Prize in 2005 for her thesis.

Elected as a councillor in Waltham Forest in 2002, Creasy served as the borough's deputy mayor and later mayor from 2002 until 2003, and for four months in 2010.

== Parliamentary career ==
After the retirement of Labour MP, Neil Gerrard, Creasy was selected from an all-female shortlist as the party's candidate for Walthamstow. At the 2010 general election, Creasy was elected to Parliament as MP for Walthamstow, winning with 51.8% of the vote and a majority of 9,478 votes.

She supported David Miliband's bid for the Labour Party leadership in 2010.

Creasy joined Labour's front-bench team in October 2011 as Shadow Minister for Crime Prevention. She then served as Shadow Minister for Business, Innovation and Skills from October 2013 to September 2015. In 2014, she was described in a The Independent profile as "one of the brightest lights of Labour's new generation" though also as "haranguing" and "aggressive". She supported the No More Page 3 campaign to stop The Sun newspaper from publishing pictures of topless glamour models.

At the 2015 general election, Creasy was re-elected as MP for Walthamstow with an increased vote share of 68.9% and an increased majority of 23,195. Following the Labour Party's defeat in the election, she stood in the Labour Party deputy leadership election. She stated she was prepared to work with any of the candidates for the party leadership, including Jeremy Corbyn, saying, "that process of rebuilding isn't about any one person it's about all of us. It's written on the back of our membership card that we achieve more together than we do alone." She gained 26% of the vote and finished second to Tom Watson. She did not back any of the final four leadership candidates.

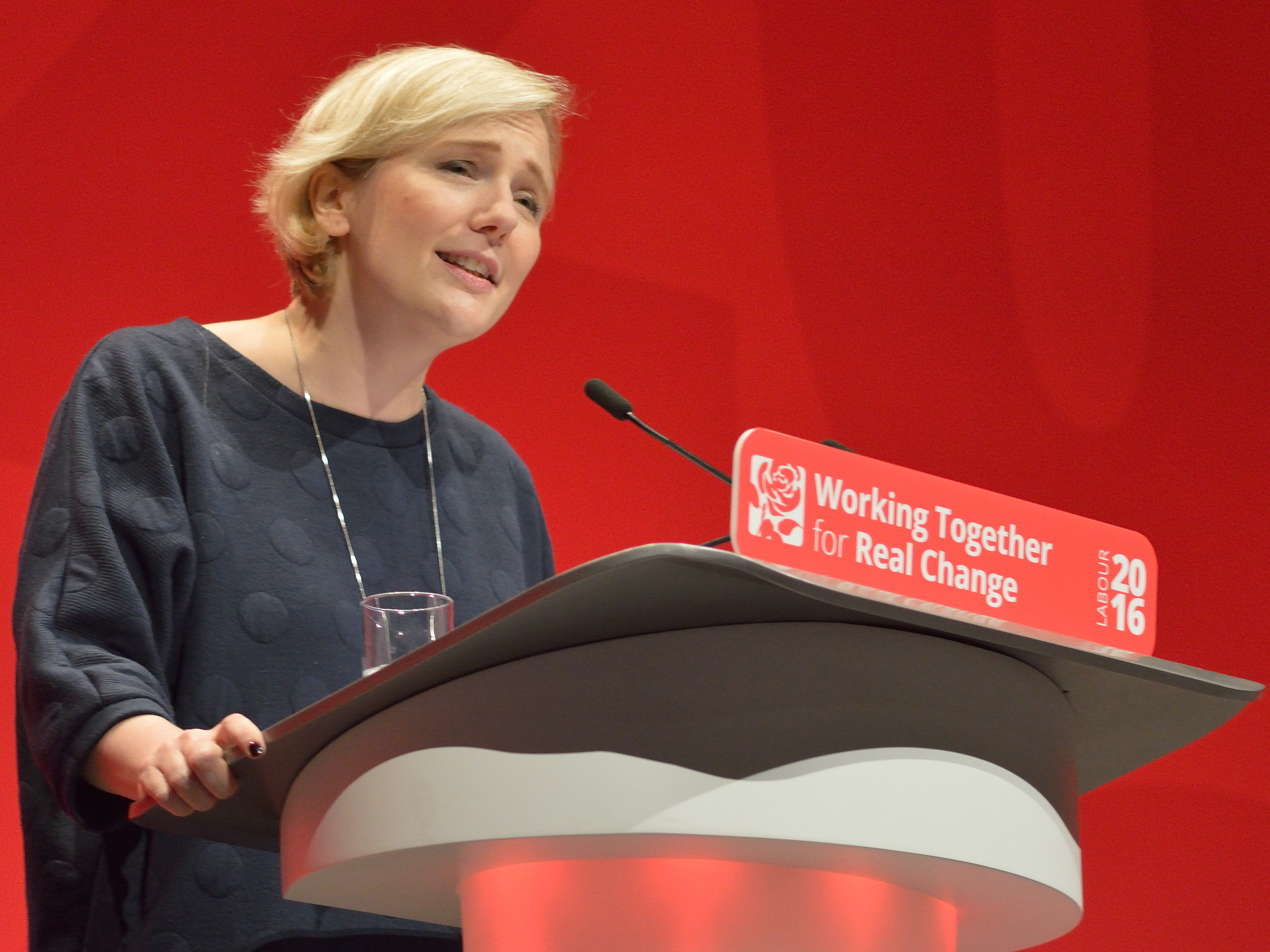
Creasy speaking at the 2016 Labour Party Conference

She later became a vocal critic of Corbyn and said the party under his leadership was "running on empty". She supported Owen Smith in his unsuccessful attempt to replace Corbyn in the 2016 Labour Party leadership election. The same year, she criticised Corbyn after he endorsed decriminalisation of the sex industry, and accused left-wing campaign group Momentum of being more interested in "meetings and moralising" than real campaigning.

Creasy supported Remain in the EU referendum in June 2016 and voted against the triggering of Article 50 in February 2017.

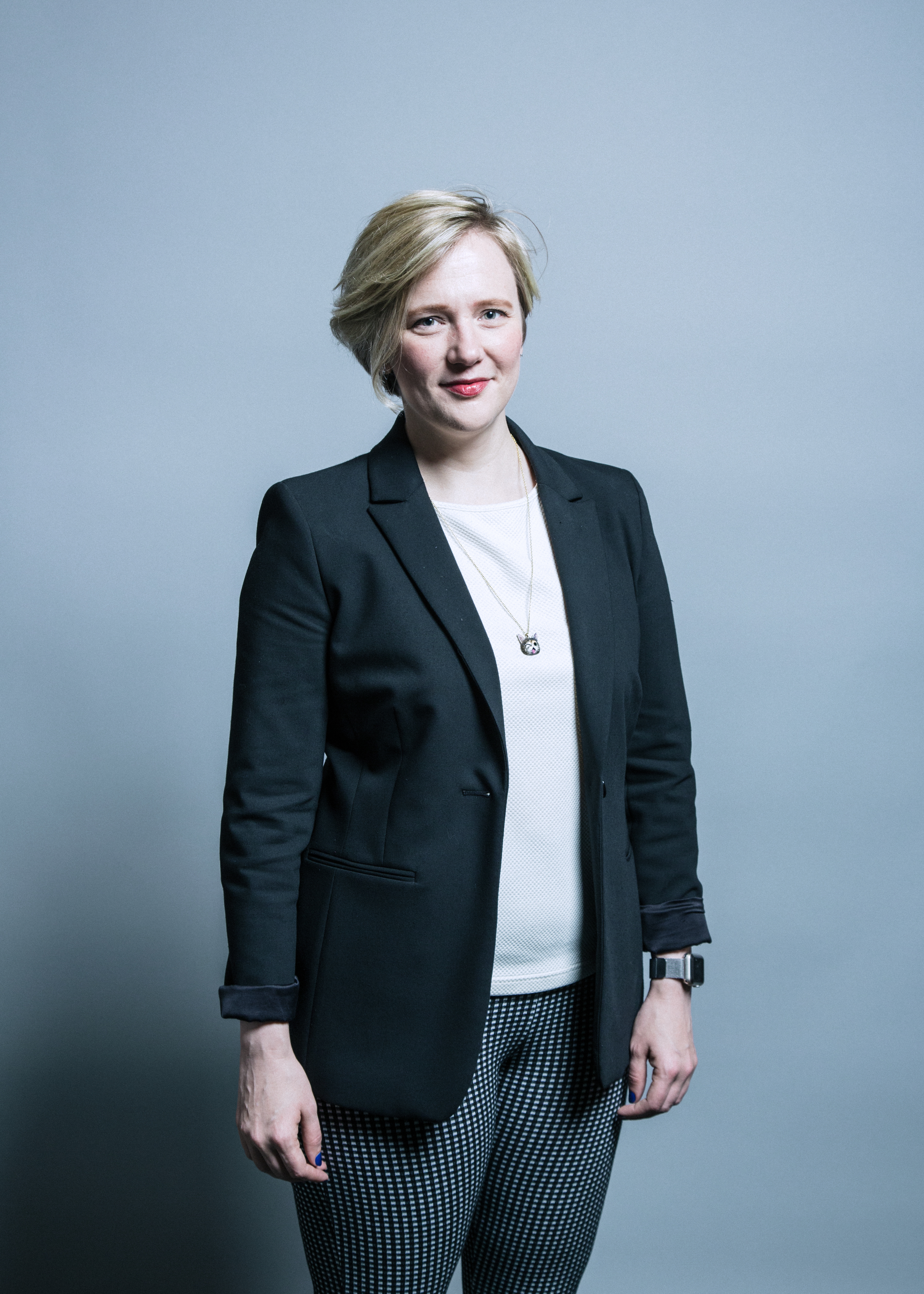
Official portrait, 2017

At the snap 2017 general election, Creasy was again re-elected with an increased vote share of 80.6% and an increased majority of 32,017.

Creasy said in September 2018 that misogyny should be made a hate crime. In June 2019, she described the culture of the Labour movement as toxic. Later that year, she was protected from a potential trigger ballot and deselection by her local party as she was on maternity leave.

At the 2019 general election, Creasy was again re-elected, with a decreased vote share of 76.1% and a decreased majority of 30,682. She was again re-elected at the 2024 general election with a decreased vote share of 59.3% and a decreased majority of 17,996.

=== Payday loans ===
Creasy has campaigned for more regulation of payday loans companies. In an article published by The Guardian in 2011, she stated that just six companies controlled lending to 90% of the seven million Britons without a bank account or credit card. She wrote that the average cost of credit charged to these customers was 272% APR, as in the rest of Europe, and that there was a fourfold increase in payday loans since the start of the recession in 2008, which led to cross-party parliamentary support for a cap. In a speech to the House of Commons, Creasy said there was a lack of competition in the market, leading to Government support for a cap of loans which exploit the poor, which in some cases reached 4000% APR. Creasy won The Spectator magazine's Campaigner of the Year prize in their Parliamentarian of the Year awards in 2011 for her work on the issue, and was also acknowledged by the coalition government's Chancellor George Osborne for her campaigning on the issue.

In 2012, a Wonga employee used company equipment to make offensive personal attacks against Creasy. Wonga made an "immediate and unreserved apology" following these malicious attacks, and Creasy asked the firm to promote one of her constituency events in aid of struggling families. The firm did not take up her offer.

=== Abortion rights ===
Abortion law in Northern Ireland was historically more restrictive than elsewhere in the United Kingdom, resulting in many women travelling from Northern Ireland to Great Britain to access abortion services. In 2017, a potential amendment to the Queen's Speech, tabled by Creasy, calling for the Government to allocate adequate funding for women who are forced to travel to England to have an abortion, gained cross-party support and was ultimately signed by 100 MPs, threatening a government defeat. Conservative MP Peter Bottomley was a co-signer of Creasy's amendment. In answer to a question from Bottomley in the Commons on 29 June 2017, Philip Hammond, Chancellor of the Exchequer, said the government would support free abortions on the mainland for Northern Irish women. Earlier in June, a Supreme Court ruling upheld the legal basis for a charge of £900 for women from the province seeking an abortion on the mainland, whereas other necessary treatments on the NHS would have been free. Creasy was cautious in her response to the development. "The devil will be in the detail", she said. She was reported to have received threats from some anti-abortion activists.

In June 2022, after the United States Supreme Court overturned Roe v. Wade, Creasy said that she would table an amendment to the Bill of Rights Bill which would make access to abortion a human right.

=== Twitter threats ===
At the end of July 2013, Creasy received numerous rape threats and other misogynistic messages on her Twitter timeline after expressing support for the feminist campaigner Caroline Criado Perez, who had lobbied the Bank of England to put a woman on the £10 note and received similar messages. On 2 September 2014, at the City of London Magistrates' Court, Peter Nunn was found guilty of sending menacing messages to Creasy, and was subsequently jailed for eighteen weeks.

Creasy wrote in an article published on 27 July: "Twitter tell me we should simply block those who 'offend us', as though a rape threat is matter of bad manners, not criminal behaviour." She appeared on Newsnight on 30 July 2013 with Toby Young, the Conservative commentator, over the validity of addressing harassment on the social networking site. She criticised him for a previous tweet about an MP's breasts. Young has objected to Twitter's subsequent change in policy, writing that the company, "shouldn't change its abuse policy in response to being brow-beaten by a politician".

=== Anti-war protests ===
Creasy allegedly received threats via social media following her vote for extending UK military action against ISIS to Syria after the parliamentary debate on 2 December 2015. Creasy was undecided until the day of the vote, while staff in her Walthamstow constituency office had to deal with what they referred to as harassing telephone calls. Protesters had gathered outside the closed constituency office the previous night urging a 'no' vote. On Facebook, Creasy defended their right to peaceful protest.

=== Maternity leave ===
In May 2021, Creasy asked for maternity leave under the same conditions as Attorney General Suella Braverman, who was granted full maternity leave under the Ministerial and other Maternity Allowances Act 2021.

=== Social services complaint ===
In April 2023, Creasy revealed that she had been subject to a baseless complaint to social services. She had been investigated by her local council after it had received a report from a man using the alias Lance Jones. The Times reported that the man had contacted Waltham Forest Council to complain that the MP's "extreme views" would damage her children and they should be removed from her care. The complainant, who apologised, had no personal connection to Creasy or her two young children.

== Personal life ==
Creasy's partner is Dan Fox, a former director of Labour Friends of Israel. In June 2019, she announced she was pregnant. She gave birth to a daughter in November 2019 and, after campaigning for better maternity rights for MPs, became the first MP to appoint a 'locum MP', Kizzy Gardiner, to manage constituency work. In February 2021, announcing her second pregnancy, she challenged government proposals to limit new plans for parliamentary maternity leave to government ministers.

Parliament of the United Kingdom
Preceded by Neil Gerrard	Member of Parliament for Walthamstow; 2010–present	Incumbent
