= Survation =

British polling and market research company

Survation Ltd
- Industry: Market Research
- Founded: 2010
- Headquarters: London, England, UK
- Area served: United Kingdom
- Services: Market Research
- Website: www.survation.com

Survation is a polling and market research agency based in London, England. Survation have been conducting research surveys since 2010. Surveys are conducted via telephone, online panel and face to face as well as omnibus research for a broad range of clients including television, newspapers, charities, lobby groups, trade unions, law firms and political parties. Damian Lyons Lowe is the company founder and Chief Executive.

== Overview ==
Survation was incorporated on 2 February 2010 as a private limited company.

The company is a member of the British Polling Council and Market Research Society. The company chief executive, Damian Lyons Lowe is the company's representative and member on the British Polling Council.

Survation was one of the most active and accurate opinion polling companies (using both online and telephone methods) during the Scottish Independence Referendum campaign, which concluded with a final result of 55% for "No". Survation’s final telephone poll, conducted on 16-17 September 2014 for The Daily Record, showed a 6-point lead for "No" at 53%, which was within the expected margin of error. After excluding undecided voters, the poll indicated a result of 47% for "Yes" and 53% for "No".

Survation’s final predictions aligned with those of other companies, including Ipsos MORI, which also used telephone polling. While all polls slightly underestimated the strength of the "No" vote, the overall predictions were considered accurate. The final margin for "No" was consistently close across different polling companies, with Survation being one of the most reliable in terms of methodology and results. In 2017, Survation asserted that their final telephone poll before the 2014 Scottish Independence referendum was the polling industry’s most accurate, surpassing Ipsos MORI’s similarly accurate results by just one decimal point.

The company also claimed that the Survation final poll before the 2015 general election was exceptionally accurate, unlike most others, but the result was suppressed by the CEO through fear of the poll being an outlier.

== 2016 EU Referendum ==
In contrast to polling published on or conducted during the day of the EU Referendum by Populus, YouGov, and Ipsos Mori that predicted the UK would vote to remain in EU, Survation conducted a private exit poll which correctly predicted Leave, despite academics deciding an exit poll for broadcast would not be feasible and an expensive and difficult proposition.

== 2017 UK election ==
Survation, alone amongst opinion pollsters, correctly predicted a hung parliament. Their Chief Executive, Damian Lyons Lowe, appeared on a BBC program where the poll was mocked and described as an "outlier". After the election, he was invited back on the BBC to talk again about his prediction.

== 2024 UK general election ==
A Survation poll released 2 days before the election predicted the Conservative party would win only 64 seats, the lowest prediction among mainstream polls.

== Methodology ==
Survation opinion polling is achieved through telephone, online and face to face surveys. Nationally, data is weighted to represent the wider population of the United Kingdom in terms of gender, age, socio-economic group, religion, how they have previously voted, and how likely a person says they are to vote in the next general election. Respondents who are either undecided or refuse to state how they would vote are excluded from the final results, unless they have provided details of how they have voted in the past, in which case, that information is used to adjust the results accordingly.

== See also ==
- Opinion polling for the 2024 United Kingdom general election
- 2010 United Kingdom general election
- Marketing research
