= Labour Against the Witchhunt =

Campaign for fair UK Labour Party discipline

- Successor: Socialist Labour Network
- Formation: 1 October 2017; 9 years ago
- Dissolved: November 27, 2021; 4 years ago
- Headquarters: BCM Box 8932, London WC1N 3XX
- Location: London, United Kingdom
- Leader: Ken Livingstone
- Chair: Jackie Walker
- Secretary: Stan Keable
- Vice Chair: Tony Greenstein

Labour Against the Witchhunt (LAW) was a group formed in late 2017 to campaign against what it regarded as politically motivated allegations of antisemitism in the British Labour Party, which LAW called a "witchhunt". LAW also campaigned against what it regarded as unfair disciplinary action taken by the Labour Party against its members, particularly in relation to such allegations of antisemitism. The group supported individual members facing disciplinary action and called for changes to the party's disciplinary procedures and code of conduct.

LAW was led by former members of the Labour Party, and campaigned through demonstrations, meetings and appeals to the Labour party leadership and members. Belonging to LAW was grounds for expulsion from Labour.

== Formation and purpose ==
LAW was launched in late 2017 to challenge what they saw as unjustified suspensions and expulsions of Labour party members, particularly in relation to allegations of antisemitism. They also call for disciplinary rules to be revised and for Labour's Compliance unit to be dissolved. They believe that the working definition of antisemitism of the International Holocaust Remembrance Alliance has, as one objective, to conflate antisemitism with critiques of Zionism and Israel and that the controversy over allegations of antisemitism in the Labour Party is to a large extent a result of rivalry between its different wings.

== Officers and membership ==
In May 2019, LAW was reported to have approaching 400 members. LAW's secretary was Stan Keable, who was expelled from the Labour Party, as were the vice-chair, Tony Greenstein and its chair, Jackie Walker. Peter Firmin was also linked to the group. Gerry Downing, with others, was excluded from LAW in January 2018 following comments he made about the role of Jews in society and other matters, which were described as antisemitic.

== Sponsors ==
Sponsors of the group included Moshé Machover, Ken Loach, Noam Chomsky, Alexei Sayle and Ian Hodson, president of the Bakers Union. Michael Mansfield, who was a supporter, said he joined to defend legitimate criticism of Israel. However, he withdrew after being presented with messages posted on social media on behalf of the group. The group later said that the messages had been sent without their knowledge or approval. In April 2019, LAW announced that Ken Livingstone had become its honorary president.

== Activities ==
In January 2018 LAW mounted a demonstration outside the Labour Party head office in protest against what they felt were politically motivated allegations of antisemitism. They also welcomed the appointment of Christine Shawcroft as chair of the Labour Party's Disputes Sub-Committee.

In February 2018 the group backed Jennie Formby in her successful bid to become General Secretary of the Labour Party.

In March 2018 they leafleted and mounted a counter demonstration against a demonstration outside Parliament organised by the Board of Deputies of British Jews and the Jewish Leadership Council against alleged antisemitism in the Labour Party.

In April 2018 they mounted a further demonstration, against the expulsion of Marc Wadsworth for his actions at the press conference for the report of the Chakrabarti Inquiry in antisemitism and racism in the Labour Party. They also mounted a crowdfunding campaign, raising £16,000 for his ultimately unsuccessful defence, calling his expulsion outrageous. Also in April, the group sent an open letter, with more than 2,500 signatures, to Labour leader Jeremy Corbyn, which blamed some allegations on a combination of supporters of Israel and Zionism with Labour right-wingers and a hostile media.

In September 2018 they demonstrated against acceptance by the National Executive Committee of the full list of examples associated with the Working Definition of Antisemitism of the International Holocaust Remembrance Alliance. The organisation organised a fringe meeting at the September 2018 Labour Party Conference, where references were made to McCarthyism and Orwell's book Nineteen Eighty-Four in relation to the situation within the party. At another fringe meeting, Greenstein told the audience that the motive behind the campaign against antisemitism was to attack the left and replace Corbyn as leader. The group handed out Palestinian flags to delegates for waving in the conference hall. In September and October 2018, the group called on Labour Party members not to cooperate with exercises by the Labour Party and the Jewish Labour Movement to obtain examples of antisemitic behaviour by members.

In January 2019 the group condemned the deselection by the Labour Party's National Executive Committee of Rebecca Gordon-Nesbitt as parliamentary candidate for South Thanet over tweets relating to accusations of antisemitism.

In February 2019 Jewish campaigners persuaded a church to decline to host the group's annual conference.

In March 2019 the group called on party members to support Chris Williamson MP, suspended for saying that the party had been "too apologetic" in the face of criticism over the issue, by lobbying the party General Secretary, signing a petition or proposing a motion. The group also held a rally the day before the Labour Party disciplinary hearing of Jackie Walker in support of her and Chris Williamson, at which she was expelled. Speakers included Walker, Ken Livingstone and Graham Bash, a leading member of Jewish Voice for Labour and editor of Labour Briefing. The location of the meeting had to be changed after the Board of Deputies of British Jews persuaded the original venue to cancel the booking. One of their members, John Davies, was alleged to be one of those seeking to deselect Louise Ellman MP, vice chair of Labour Friends of Israel.

In May 2019 the group co-organised with the local Momentum branch a training session on antisemitism for Reading Labour Party members, addressed by the secretary of Jewish Voice for Labour. Local party officers said that the meeting had no official status.

On 27 November 2021, following a vote by its members, the group announced it had merged with the Labour In Exile Network (LIEN), with the consolidated entity being called the Socialist Labour Network. In response to this merger, four members of the group's steering committee resigned. The group's webpage has not posted any updates since December 2021.

=== Proscription by Labour ===
In July 2021, LAW was proscribed by Labour's National Executive Committee along with three other far-left factions — Resist, the Labour in Exile Network and Socialist Appeal — on the grounds that "these organisations are not compatible with Labour's rules or our aims and values." These factions were sympathetic to former leader Jeremy Corbyn and had been accused of obstructing efforts to combat antisemitism within Labour. The Committee also ruled that belonging to these factions is grounds for expulsion from Labour. In response, several left-leaning groups picketed the Labour Party's headquarters in Victoria, London to protest the NEC's decision. LAW sponsors Ken Loach and Ian Hodson were automatically expelled from the party following the proscription.

== Critical reactions ==
LAW was described as controversial by The Daily Telegraph and as far-left by The Times, while The Jewish Chronicle dismissed it as a fringe organisation.

Andrew Percy MP, in a speech in the House of Commons, called the group's claim that the series of allegations of antisemitism was a witch hunt a "new smear" and asked MPs to "call out" the group, while Wes Streeting MP called the group intimidating, when they demonstrated outside the disciplinary hearing for Marc Wadsworth. The Jewish Labour Movement has said that the organisation, along with Jewish Voice for Labour, "ridicule and minimise the real lived experiences of victims of antisemitism", and Stephane Savary, a representative of Left Wing Zionists for Labour, urged the party to expel the organisation. In February 2019, the Jewish Labour Movement called on the Labour Representation Committee not to work with the organisation or with JVL.

== Related works ==
Jackie Walker produced, co-wrote and appeared in a one-woman show The Lynching, which premiered in 2017, based partly on the events leading up to the formation of the group. Two documentary films on the subject have also been produced, The Political Lynching of Jackie Walker in 2018 and, in 2019, Witch Hunt. She was also featured in the documentary series, The Lobby, on lobbying by Israel in the UK.
