= Tony Greenstein =

British left-wing activist and writer

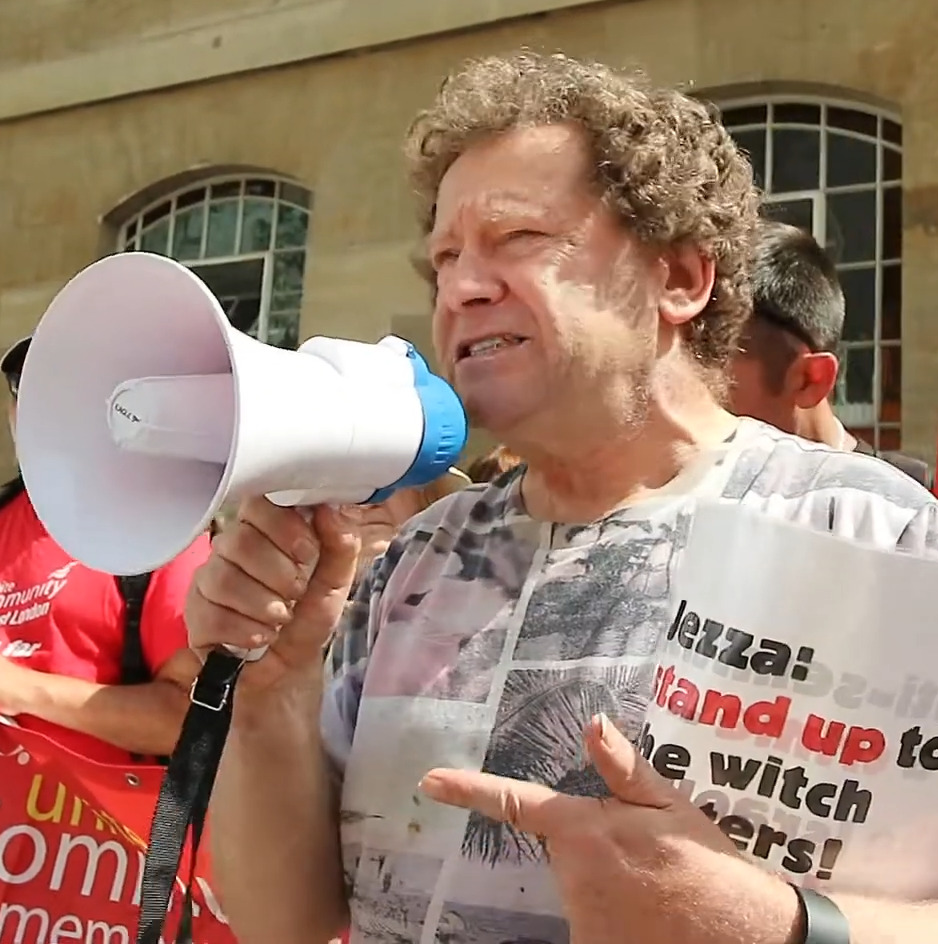
- Born: December 1953 (age 72)
- Education: Brighton Polytechnic, Birkbeck, University of London, University of Sussex
- Occupations: Activist; Writer
- Known for: Anti-fascist activism; Anti-Zionism; Palestine solidarity activism

Tony Greenstein (born December 1953) is a British left-wing activist and writer. An anti-fascist and former squatter, he was a founder member of the Palestine Solidarity Campaign and stood for parliament as a representative of the Alliance for Green Socialism. In 2018, he was expelled from the Labour Party for "harassment" and "abusive language", over allegations of antisemitism. Greenstein is opposed to Zionism which he believes is a racist and supremacist ideology.

== Early life and education ==
Greenstein's father's parents moved from Poland to England before World War II, with his father saying that many of his other relatives who remained in Poland died in The Holocaust in Treblinka extermination camp. Greenstein grew up in Liverpool. He was raised in an Orthodox Jewish family and his father was Rabbi Solomon Greenstein, who opposed Oswald Mosley's British Union of Fascists at the Battle of Cable Street in 1936. He was educated at King David High School, Liverpool.

He moved to Brighton to study Maths and Chemistry at Brighton Polytechnic and was elected vice-president of the student union. In 1974, he became involved in housing activism alongside Steve Bassam and squatted in derelict hotels before negotiating a licence to live at Lansdowne Place.

He has written that he returned to formal education in later life. In 1996 he received a master's degree in Colonial History from Birkbeck, University of London. From 2000 to 2002 he took a law degree from the University of Sussex immediately followed by a Legal Practice Course at The College of Law in Guildford.

== Career ==
In 2013, Greenstein was secretary of the Brighton and Hove Unemployed Workers Centre, a community centre in Hollingdean.

== Political activity ==
In 1980, he was one of the founders of the Brighton Campaign Against Youth Unemployment and he was also involved with anti-fascist campaigns. Greenstein actively opposed the far-right National Front and neo-nazi British Movement in Brighton during the 1970s, 1980s and 1990s, as a member of the Brighton & Hove Anti-Fascist Committee and Anti Fascist Action. In more recent years he has been involved in campaigning against far-right groups such as the British National Party, English Defence League and March for England (MfE) in the city.

He was a founder member of the Palestine Solidarity Campaign and in the 1980s, he ran the Labour Movement Campaign for Palestine.

In 2005, Greenstein stood unsuccessfully for parliament in the Brighton Pavilion constituency for the Alliance for Green Socialism, getting 188 votes.

Greenstein was barred from joining the Labour Party in 2015 and then joined following the election of Jeremy Corbyn as leader. He was suspended in 2016 regarding accusations of antisemitism and then expelled in February 2018 after a review by Labour's National Constitutional Committee.

Greenstein co-founded Labour Against the Witchhunt and told a Jewish Voice for Labour meeting during the 2018 Labour Party Conference that charges of antisemitism in the UK Labour Party were designed to destabilise Corbyn.

In July 2026 Greenstein reported that he had been expelled from the Green Party (having been suspended in April 2026) for alleged antisemitism.

== Court cases ==
In 2019, Greenstein sued the Campaign Against Antisemitism for libel over its claim that he was a "notorious antisemite". A court ruled that the CAA could use a defence of honest opinion rather than needing to prove its allegation was factually correct. A High Court justice dismissed Greenstein's case in 2020, ruling that based on tweets published by Greenstein in which he wrote about "racist scum", "Jewish Nazis", Nazi collaboration, and "Zios", an honest person could reasonably consider Greenstein an antisemite.

In December 2021 Greenstein accepted a two-year restraining order in return for the Crown Prosecution Service dropping two charges of harassment against the Labour Party's disputes team. The restraint order prevented him from further contacting the disputes team.

In September 2023 Greenstein was given a 9-month prison sentence, suspended for two years, for his part in a Palestine Action attack on the factory of Elbit Systems, an Israeli arms company, at Shenstone near Walsall. He was convicted, with three others, of intent to cause criminal damage.

In November 2024 Greenstein was charged with a terrorism offence under Section 12(1) of the Terrorism Act 2000. Greenstein was accused of supporting the proscribed organisation Hamas. The charges stemmed from social media comments posted by Greenstein on 7 October 2023, in which he expressed support for the "Gaza ghetto uprising". One post contained links to a blog post which stated "Whatever criticisms one can make of Hamas, we should congratulate them on this well planned and audacious attack on the Zionist enemy".

During his trial in 2026 Greenstein said in his defence that he supported Hamas' actions against Israel but had consistently opposed it as an organisation. The judge cautioned Greenstein several times for discussing the Arab-Israeli conflict, stating that the jury was "not concerned with events in the Middle East". Greenstein gave the closing speech to the jury himself, rather than relying on his barrister. The judge said she considered charging him with contempt of court following this speech. He was acquitted of the charge on 21 August 2026, with the jury finding him not guilty after just over two hours of deliberation. He delivered a speech outside court calling for David Lammy, Keir Starmer and Yvette Cooper to be put on trial for "having helped Israel perpetrate a genocide".

== Private life ==
Greenstein is married though now separated, with three sons and a daughter. Greenstein and his wife remain carers of a severely autistic son.

== Selected works ==
- —— (2011). The Fight Against Fascism in Brighton & the South Coast (pamphlet). Brighton History Workshop. Vol. 1. Brighton: Greenstein. ISBN 978-0-9931278-0-9. OCLC 943993662.
- ——. Zionism: Antisemitism's twin in Jewish garb (pamphlet).
- —— (2022). Zionism During the Holocaust. London: New Generation Publishing. ISBN 978-1-80369-304-0.
