= National Constitutional Committee =

The National Constitutional Committee (NCC) is a senior organ of the UK Labour Party concerned with discipline. It is covered by Clause IX: of the Labour Party Rule Book, the governing document for the Labour Party in the United Kingdom.

Members are elected for a three year term. Members on the committee have included Professor Cecile Wright, Vice-Chair of Momentum.

== Discipline ==
=== Allegations of antisemitism ===
In 2018, an activist from the pro-Corbyn Momentum Black ConneXions, Marc Wadsworth was expelled from the Labour Party for bringing the party into disrepute. This decision related to a confrontation on 30 June 2016 between him and Jewish Labour MP, Ruth Smeeth at the launch of the Chakrabarti Inquiry report into allegations of antisemitism and other forms of racism in the Labour Party.

At the first day's hearing by the NCC into Wadsworth's future in the Labour Party on 25 April 2018, Smeeth was escorted by Labour colleagues while a group protested with pro-Wadsworth placards. Two Labour MPs were witnesses for Wadsworth. Chris Williamson made clear his views on the handling of antisemitism allegations. Clive Lewis alleged afterwards that there was racism against Wadsworth. On 27 April 2018, the National Constitutional Committee found proven two charges including prejudicial and detrimental conduct, a breach of the Membership procedures of the Labour Party Rule Book. The NCC determined that the sanction would be expulsion from membership. Wadsworth's expulsion was welcomed by the Jewish Labour Movement while Jewish Voice for Labour passed a resolution calling for his reinstatement.

Williamson later faced formal investigation and suspension.

Shami Chakrabarti's findings and recommendations included the procedural rule changes to improve the party's disciplinary process and the adoption and publication of a complaints procedure.
