= Jackie Walker (activist) =

20th and 21st-century British socialist and writer (born 1954)

- Born: Jacqueline Walker; 10 April 1954 (age 72); Harlem, Manhattan, New York City, United States
- Citizenship: British-American
- Education: Goldsmiths College
- Occupations: Teacher, writer, anti-racism activist, charity worker
- Years active: 1981–present
- Notable work: Pilgrim State, The Lynching
- Title: Vice-Chair of Momentum
- Term: September 2015 – October 2016
- Successor: Cecile Wright
- Political party: Independent
- Other political affiliations: Labour (1981–2019; suspended 2016; expelled 2019)
- Partner: Graham Bash
- Children: 3
- Parent(s): Jack Cohen (father); Dorothy Brown (mother)

Jacqueline Walker (born 10 April 1954) is a British and American political activist and writer. She has been a teacher and anti-racism trainer. She is the author of a family memoir, Pilgrim State, and the co-writer and performer of a one-woman show, The Lynching. She held the roles of vice-chair of South Thanet Constituency Labour Party and vice-chair of Momentum before being suspended and ultimately expelled from the party for misconduct.

== Background ==
Walker has described her family background in both her family memoir, Pilgrim State, and her play, The Lynching as being of mixed Jewish and African descent. According to Walker, her mother, Dorothy Brown, was a black Jamaican and Sephardi Jew who was descended partly from a Portuguese Jew who came to the West Indies during the days of Christopher Columbus, and a female slave who converted to Judaism on marriage. Born in Kingston, Jamaica, in 1915, she won a scholarship to study medicine in the United States, where she married and had a daughter, giving up her studies. In 1949, she was committed temporarily to a mental institution, where was on occasion held in isolation, placed in a straitjacket and subjected to ECT treatment, by her husband, who was seeking to end the relationship. Her eldest daughter was put into care and was ultimately fostered while her second child was returned to her on her release. Later, her mother attempted to retrieve her elder daughter but without success. Released, and active in the civil rights movement, she met Walker's Ashkenazi Jewish father, Jack Cohen, whose family fled anti-Jewish pogroms in the Russian Empire around 1918 and came to New York, where he became a jeweller.

Walker was born in Harlem, Manhattan, New York City in 1954. In 1956, her mother, with Walker and her step brother, were deported to Jamaica, which Walker attributes to McCarthyism. There, racial discrimination barred her mother from many jobs, and she had to leave her children with relatives for months while she travelled looking for work. In 1959, Walker's mother, with her children, moved to London. Her mother suffered from periods of severe depression since her 30s, as well as physical illness in later life. Family life was characterised by abject poverty, cramped, squalid and chaotic living conditions and continual racist attacks, despite her mother's best efforts: as a result, Walker and her step brothers spent time in care homes or with foster families. She was the only black child in her primary school and suffered from racial bullying both at school and when in care. When Walker was 11, she witnessed the sudden death of her mother at the age of 50, after which Walker lived in care homes and was then permanently fostered.

== Career ==
Walker was in the National Youth Theatre but, as she thought that as a black person she would get few roles, went instead to Goldsmiths College and trained to become a teacher. In her first year, she married and had a baby, returning to her studies when her baby was six weeks old. She worked as a teacher at a pupil referral unit for emotionally and behaviourally disturbed young people.

Walker completed an M. Phil, in which she examined the development of identity in the work of Black British writers. Having completed two Arvon Foundation writing courses, she was awarded an Arts Council England grant to complete her family memoir Pilgrim State, published by Sceptre in April 2006. It was placed on the reading list of the social worker training course at Brunel University London, where Walker gave bi-weekly lectures and was a member of the committee for social work training.

She has been an anti-racist trainer and charity worker and has a long record of anti-racist activism and as a political activist. She has contributed to educational materials and written training manuals on anti-racism.

== Labour Party ==
Walker joined the Labour Party in 1981. She was elected vice-chair of South Thanet Constituency Labour Party and played a leading role in the campaign there to prevent the election of the UKIP leader Nigel Farage in the 2015 general election. She was elected to Momentum's Steering Committee, becoming its vice-chair in September 2015, and is a member of Jewish Voice for Labour (JVL). On 27 March 2019, Walker was expelled from the Labour Party for "prejudicial and grossly detrimental behaviour against the party". She nonetheless retained her JVL membership.

=== First investigation ===
In Walker's Facebook account, a private discussion from February 2016 was recorded in which a friend of Walker had raised the question of 'the debt' owed to the Jews because of the Holocaust. In the discussion, Walker had responded:

Oh yes – and I hope you feel the same towards the African holocaust? My ancestors were involved in both – on all sides as I'm sure you know, millions more Africans were killed in the African holocaust and their oppression continues today on a global scale in a way it doesn't for Jews ... and many Jews (my ancestors too) were the chief financiers of the sugar and slave trade which is of course why there were so many early synagogues in the Caribbean. So who are victims and what does it mean? We are victims and perpetrators to some extent through choice. And having been a victim does not give you a right to be a perpetrator.

Her private comments were "uncovered" by the Israel Advocacy Movement which, it says, aims "to counter British hostility to Israel." The Jewish Chronicle published her comments on 4 May 2016 and notified the Labour Party about them. The Labour Party suspended her, pending investigation, on the same day that The Jewish Chronicle published its article. The Chair of Momentum, Jon Lansman, addressing the criticism of Walker, referred to "a 'lynch mob' whose interest in combatting racism is highly selective". The investigation and accompanying suspension concluded after a few weeks with the decision that not to proceed with disciplinary action.

In response to her critics, Walker said:

Yes, I wrote 'many Jews (my ancestors too) were the chief financiers of the sugar and slave trade'. These words, taken out of context in the way the media did, of course do not reflect my position. I was writing to someone who knew the context of my comments. Had he felt the need to pick me up on what I had written I would have rephrased – perhaps to 'Jews (my ancestors too) were among those who financed the sugar and slave trade and at the particular time/in the particular area I'm talking about they played an important part.' ... [My claim] has never been that Jews played a disproportionate role in the Atlantic Slave Trade, merely that, as historians such as Arnold Wiznitzer noted, at a certain economic point, in specific regions where my ancestors lived, Jews played a dominant role 'as financiers of the sugar industry, as brokers and exporters of sugar, and as suppliers of Negro slaves on credit.'

Dave Rich has argued that Walker's comments are reminiscent of the Nation of Islam's antisemitic views on the role of Jews in the slave trade. Walker's response has been that 'the Nation of Islam is an antisemitic group which seeks to set Jewish and Black people against each other. Any examination of my work, my writing, my life, would make clear my opposition to this ideology.'

=== Second investigation ===
During the September 2016 Labour Party Conference, Walker attended a training session on antisemitism for party members held by the Jewish Labour Movement (JLM). Her remarks at the meeting led to her second investigation by the party.

Jeremy Newmark, the chair of the JLM, said after the meeting that Walker had acted "to denigrate security provision at Jewish schools" when, at the meeting, she said "I was a bit concerned by your suggestion that the Jewish community is under such threat that it has to use security in all its buildings. I have a grandson, he is a year old. There is security in his nursery and every school has security now. It's not because I’m frightened or his parents are frightened that he is going to be attacked." After the meeting, she said: "I did not raise a question on security in Jewish schools. The trainer raised this issue, and I asked for clarification, in particular, as all London primary schools, to my knowledge have security and I did not understand the particular point the trainer was making. Having been a victim of racism, I would never play down the very real fears the Jewish community have, especially in light of recent attacks in France."

In the session, there was a discussion on the definition of antisemitism set out by the JLM, which included examples relating to Israel and which has been the subject of debate within the Labour Party. Walker said, in relation to the discussion, and speaking as an anti-racism trainer, "I still haven't heard a definition of antisemitism I can work with". Jeremy Newmark said: "I am appalled that somebody ... would come to a training session designed to help party activists address antisemitism and use the occasion to challenge the legitimacy of the training itself."

At the event, Walker queried what she saw as the limited scope of Holocaust Memorial Day, saying: 'Wouldn't it be wonderful if Holocaust Memorial Day was open to all peoples who've experienced holocaust.' When others shouted that it did include other genocides, she responded "In practice, it's not actually circulated and advertised as such." Later, in an interview, she asked why Holocaust Memorial Day only concerns genocides committed since the 1940s, thereby excluding 'the African holocaust' during the slave trade. She has also said, following the meeting, "I would never play down the significance of the Shoah. Working with many Jewish comrades, I continue to seek to bring greater awareness of other genocides, which are too often forgotten or minimised. If offence has been caused, it is the last thing I would want to do and I apologise."

A number of prominent left-wing activists have defended Walker, including film director Ken Loach, who said she should be allowed to play a significant role in the party, and Noam Chomsky who said "I wholeheartedly support the right of anyone to criticise Israel without being branded antisemitic. That goes in particular for Jackie Walker."

Facing a threat of losing support from the TSSA trades union, Momentum removed Walker as vice-chair, while retaining her as a Steering Committee member, with the Committee stating that, although it "does not regard any of the comments she appears to have made, taken individually, to be antisemitic ... the Committee does consider her remarks on Holocaust Memorial Day and on security of Jewish schools to be ill-informed, ill-judged and offensive. In such circumstances, the Committee feels that Jackie should have done more to explain herself to mitigate the upset caused." The Committee stated that "Jackie should not be expelled from the Labour party."

Later that month, Walker was suspended from the Labour Party pending investigation, for a second time, with Labour's National Executive Committee referring her case to the party's National Constitutional Committee. After Walker's party disciplinary hearing in relation to the investigation on 26 March 2019, Walker was expelled from the party the next day.

== Talk shows and films ==
In March 2017, Glasgow Friends of Israel and Labour Against Antisemitism failed to prevent her speaking on Palestine: Free Speech And Israel's "Black Ops" at Dundee University. A similar event at Aberdeen University was cancelled after the invitation to speak was withdrawn. Labour Against Anti-Semitism described her talk as "part of an increasing normalisation of anti-Semitic hate speech that has to be confronted and eliminated" and that it "threatens the safety of Jewish students" and therefore the university was "failing in its duty of care". Walker responded that there was a difference between being pro-Palestine and anti-Zionist, and anti-Semitic, and that she and her partner were Jewish.

Walker also performed in a one-woman show about her experience, The Lynching, which she wrote in collaboration with Norman Thomas and premiered at the Edinburgh Festival Fringe in August 2017. The Board of Deputies of British Jews wrote to Edinburgh Council to express their concern that the show was being mounted on council owned facilities. They informed the council of the allegations made against Walker and that these allegations had resulted in her suspension from the Labour Party and the loss of her vice-chair role with Momentum. Walker interpreted this as an attempt to prevent the show going ahead.

Walker was extensively interviewed in The Lobby, the 2017 TV series by Al Jazeera about some of the pro-Israel organisations and individuals active in the United Kingdom.

In September 2018, the Jewish Voice for Labour sponsored a premiere of the documentary film The Political Lynching of Jackie Walker which was to have been presented while the Labour Party Conference was being held nearby. The audience of 200 people had to be evacuated after a bomb threat. In a statement, Jewish Voice for Labour said the film "is an incisive and chilling exposé of attempts to silence critics of Israel, in particular those who support the socialist project of Labour leader Jeremy Corbyn. It connects the global struggle against racism and the far right with the Palestinian cause."

Another film, on the accusations of antisemitism against Walker and others following the election of Jeremy Corbyn as leader of the Labour Party, entitled Witch Hunt, premiered in Broadstairs on 3 February 2019. In the same month, the Board of Deputies of British Jews complained to the Labour Party about Chris Williamson MP, for booking a room to enable the showing of the film in Parliament. A Labour spokeswoman said of Williamson's action: "It's completely inappropriate to book a room for an event about an individual who is suspended from the party and subject to ongoing disciplinary procedures." The screening was cancelled, which the film's promoters said was due to intimidation.

== Activism and political views ==
As a young woman, Walker was active in the anti-apartheid movement.

She is a supporter of Palestinian rights, a critic of Israeli policy towards Palestinians, and a supporter of the Boycott, Divestment and Sanctions (BDS) movement. She is also a member of Jews for Justice for Palestinians and the Palestine Solidarity Campaign.

Walker is a founding member of the Kent Anti-Racist Network and Labour Against the Witchhunt. She has said that "Opposition to a Jewish state is, and remains, a legitimate, honourable political position and one that many, including many Jews, have stood by for decades".

In February 2019, she was elected to the board of the Labour Representation Committee.

Walker supported Jeremy Corbyn during his period as leader of the Labour Party. She said Corbyn had opposed racism, war, injustice and oppression all his life and called his leadership "the greatest challenge to the established political order the UK has seen for some time". She said the mainstream media and the right of the Labour Party had weaponised anti-Semitism to attack Corbyn.

== Personal life ==
Walker has both American and British citizenship.

When asked if she would describe herself as an anti-Zionist and not an anti-Semite, Walker said: "Yes. I certainly wouldn't call myself an anti-Semite as I am Jewish and my partner is Jewish." Walker was raised as a Catholic for part of her childhood.

She has an elder sister, an elder brother and a younger brother. She has three children.

In 2010, Walker moved from London to Broadstairs, Kent where she lives with her partner, the editor of Labour Briefing, Graham Bash.

== See also ==
- The Lobby (TV series)
- Antisemitism in the UK Labour Party

Party political offices
New title	Vice-Chair of Momentum; 2015–2016	Succeeded by Cecile Wright
