= Witch Hunt (2019 film) =

- Directed by: Jon Pullman
- Distributed by: Jewish Voice for Labour
- Release dates: 3 February 2019 (Palace Cinema, Broadstairs)
- Country: United Kingdom
- Language: English

Witch Hunt is a 2019 film directed by Jon Pullman. The film is about allegations of antisemitism within the Labour Party. Pullman stated that he sought to place the allegations in a wider historical context. The film features Jackie Walker, a Jewish Labour Party and anti-racist activist who was investigated by the party twice in 2016 following allegations of antisemitism. Members are suspended during investigations and the second suspension was still in force at the time of the film's release. The films covered some of the same ground as Walker's one woman show, The Lynching, and the television series, The Lobby.

The film premiered at the Palace Cinema, Broadstairs on Sunday, 3 February 2019. A London screening followed on 10 February, followed by a Questions and Answers session featuring Alexei Sayle, Jon Pullman, Jackie Walker and Justin Schlosberg, chaired by Naomi Wimborne-Idrissi.

== Cancelled parliamentary screening ==
The Labour Party MP, Chris Williamson was criticised by a Labour Party spokesperson for booking a room in the Houses of Parliament for a screening of the film scheduled for 4 March 2019, to be hosted by Jewish Voice for Labour. The Board of Deputies of British Jews and Labour MPs Tom Watson, Lilian Greenwood and Ruth Smeeth complained about the room booking to the Labour Party, despite the fact that none of them had viewed the film since it had not been publicly released. Jennie Formby, General Secretary of the Labour Party, and Nick Brown, Chief Whip of the Parliamentary Labour Party, stated they would ensure Williamson would cancel the screening, given that Walker was suspended. The screening was cancelled and Jewish Voice for Labour said that this was as a result of intimidation.

== See also ==
- The Lynching
- The Lobby (TV series)
