= Pilgrim State (book) =

2008 book by Jacqueline Walker

- Author: Jacqueline Walker
- Language: English
- Genre: Memoir, novelisation
- Publisher: Sceptre
- Publication date: April 2008
- Publication place: United Kingdom
- Media type: Print
- Pages: 353
- ISBN: 978-0340960806

Pilgrim State is a 2008 part family memoir, part novelisation book written by British activist Jacqueline Walker about a mother with mental illness and how her family was treated by the social services.

== Background ==
Walker was awarded an Arts Council England grant to complete the memoir and spent three years writing the book. She told Time Out: "I got to the writing-up stage but I was a single parent and I ran out of money. I began working as a teacher at a pupil referral unit for emotionally and behaviourally disturbed young people. When I was made redundant, I started writing the book."

Walker said the book "began as a family project, a way to find out more, not just about my mother; like many children who had been in care, our family had little information about what had happened to us as children." Walker told Time Out, "There are many reasons why I wrote the book; one of them is because I think that the kind of quiet, everyday heroism of people like her, who try and change their situation and succeed or fail to whatever degree, is largely unsung. We’re so conditioned to discuss illegal immigrants and refugees, but we tend to forget their courage."

== Summary ==
Pilgrim State is a memoir of Walker's childhood from 1951 to the early 1960s, and details her mother Dorothy Brown's experiences with mental illness, their relationship, and how the family was treated by the social services. It is in three sections, each told from a different point of view: that of the mother, Walker's childhood perspective in the third person, and her first-person re-telling to her own daughter.

== Release ==
Pilgrim State was published in April 2008 and adapted for audio in November that year.

== Critical response ==
Louise Carpenter of The Guardian called it "a tragic story about one woman's battle with the social services and how they treated her 'problem family'." Sue Arnold of The Guardian called it "A survival story to warm the chilliest heart." John Harris of The Guardian called it a "story of her mother's mental illness and her family's grim treatment at the hands of social services."

Chris Weedon wrote in Contemporary Women's Writing, "Although literary depictions of the Caribbean migrant in London are not new – many black and South Asian British writers published since 1970 depict the effects of migration and settlement on first and second generations." Summer Pervez of The Literary London Journal said, "In Pilgrim State, Walker successfully recreates her mother's life in homage to the remarkable woman that she was, despite facing obstacles of prejudice and loss across three continents."

Tamara Gausi of Time Out said, "Pilgrim State details a working-class London that's fast disappearing" and called it "remarkable".

Suzanne Scafe (2009) wrote in an article in Women: A Cultural Review that Walker "refuses to see her mother merely as a victim, choosing instead to celebrate her mother's life and the happiness that she afforded Jacqueline as a child".

In Changing English (2010) Suzanne Scafe writes that Walker's memories "are placed against documents that authenticate aspects of her mother's life"

== See also ==
- The Lynching
