= Jon Lansman =

British political activist (born 1957)

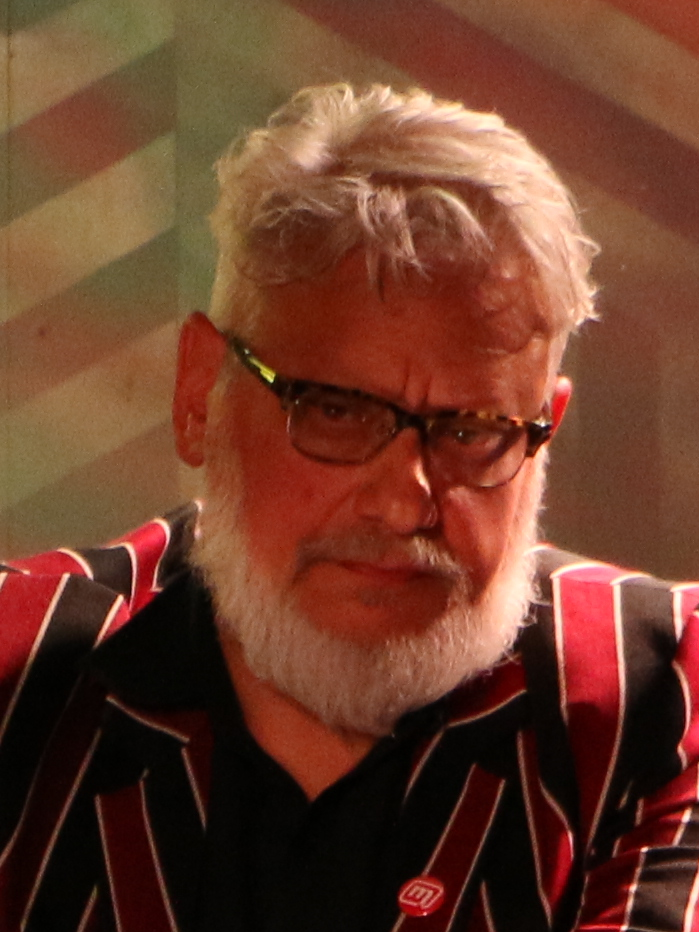
- Lansman in 2017

Chairman of Momentum
- In office 13 September 2015 – 5 July 2020
- Deputy: Emina Ibrahim; Cecile Wright
- Leader: Jeremy Corbyn; Keir Starmer
- Preceded by: Office established
- Succeeded by: Andrew Scattergood; Gaya Sriskanthan

Personal details
- Born: Jonathan Lansman; 9 July 1957 (age 69) Marylebone, London, England
- Party: Labour
- Other political affiliations: Momentum
- Spouse: Beth Wagstaff
- Children: 3
- Education: Highgate School; Clare College, Cambridge; Birkbeck, University of London
- Occupation: Parliamentary researcher
- Profession: Political activist

Jonathan Lansman (born 9 July 1957) is a British political activist. He is best known for having worked on Jeremy Corbyn's successful 2015 campaign for the leadership of the Labour Party, and for subsequently founding the pro-Corbyn organisation Momentum. He was a member of the Labour Party's National Executive Committee. Lansman has worked for both Tony Benn and Michael Meacher, and was a prominent supporter of Benn in the early 1980s.

== Early life ==
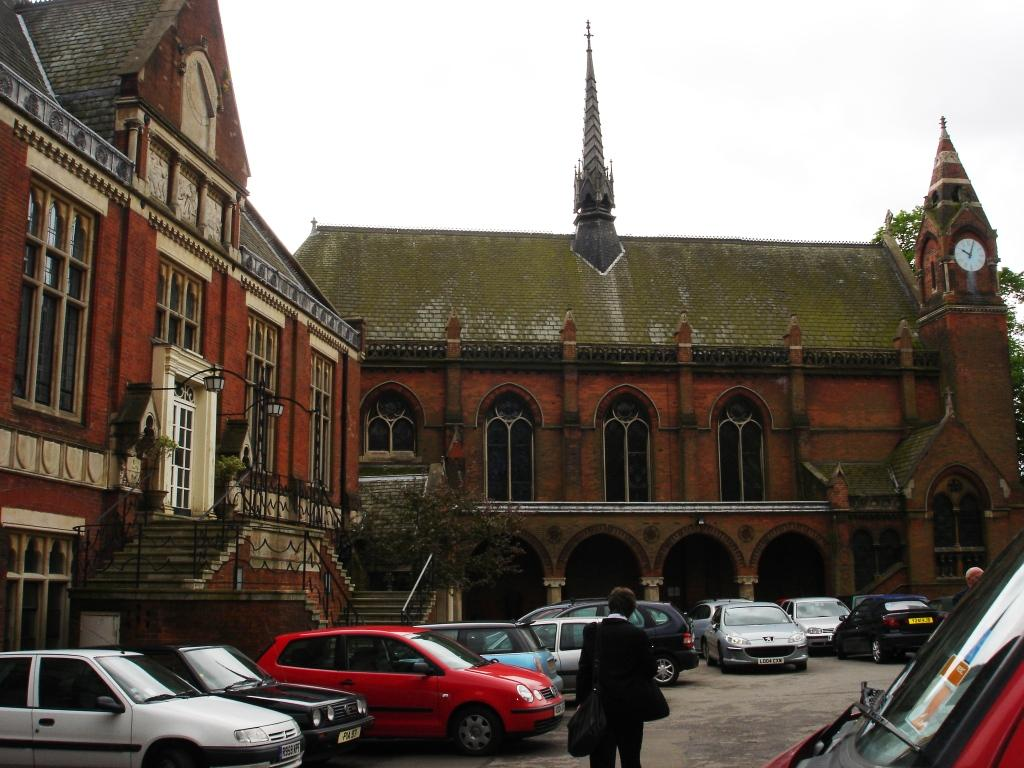
Highgate School

Lansman was brought up in an Orthodox Jewish family in Southgate, north London. His father Bernard was a Conservative councillor in Hackney.

He was a pupil at the private Highgate School from 1970 to 1975. He first visited Israel when he was 16: "I worked on a kibbutz in the Negev and my aunt lived in Beersheba. It was actually a very politicising experience. When I did my bar mitzvah I saw myself as a Zionist and I think after I went there I felt it less. I was more interested in the kibbutz and what I liked about it was the pioneering spirit, the sense of community and radicalism of it."

He read for a degree in Economics at Clare College, Cambridge, graduating in 1979. Later, he attended Birkbeck, University of London, reading History and Politics graduating in 2007 with a Masters. He was active in the student union while at Cambridge University and was an elected student member of the Academic Board. Lansman ran for Union President on the same slate as Andrew Marr, then nicknamed Red Andy, who provided campaign cartoons. Soon afterwards he became a friend of Labour's election agent in Hornsey, Jeremy Corbyn.

== Political career ==
=== Tony Benn's leadership campaigns ===
During the Labour Party's early years of opposition following the defeat of James Callaghan's Labour government in 1979, Lansman worked as the "chief fixer" for Tony Benn. He was a prominent member of the Campaign for Labour Party Democracy and worked with Benn on his campaign during the 1981 Labour deputy leadership election. He was also the secretary of the Rank and File Mobilising Committee, which was the primary campaigning organisation for Benn. Although Benn was not elected, Lansman was successful in his election to the Labour Co-ordinating Committee.

During the deputy leadership election campaign, on the Weekend World discussion programme of 21 September, Denis Healey wrongly accused Lansman of organising the severe heckling of speeches he had given in Cardiff and Birmingham. Lansman denied this was the case, as he had been in Spain during the Cardiff meeting and travelling to Aberystwyth during the Birmingham meeting. Healey later apologised for his mistake. According to Lansman, the producers of Weekend World, London Weekend Television, accepted he had been slandered and made an out-of-court settlement.

Mervyn Jones identified Lansman as part of a group on the left that were "quite prepared to see a right-wing breakaway as the necessary cost of swinging the party in what they saw as the desired direction". Alongside Vladimir Derer and Victor Schonfield, Lansman was described as "unreservedly dedicated", with "no political ambitions of [his] own" and "in a position to work day and night for the cause without pay". Lansman later organised Benn's campaign in the 1988 Labour leadership election, unsuccessfully challenging incumbent Neil Kinnock.

Lansman was a town councillor for Hertford until 2003, when he decided not to seek re-election.

By 2009, he became a member of the Labour Representation Committee refounded in 2004.

From 2010, Lansman worked as a researcher for Michael Meacher. In 2010, Lansman became the editor of the left-wing website, Left Futures.

=== Leadership of Jeremy Corbyn ===
Lansman volunteered for Jeremy Corbyn's leadership campaign in the 2015 Labour Party leadership election, and was the sole director of Jeremy Corbyn Campaign 2015 (Supporters) Ltd, an official campaign company that held the data collected by the campaign. During the election, he was criticised for posting a link on Twitter to a Facebook page depicting rival candidate Liz Kendall as a future Conservative Party leader. A Corbyn campaign spokesperson commented: "Jon Lansman's tweets are not on behalf of the campaign. We discourage all Jeremy Corbyn supporters from joining in with spoof websites or social media."

Following Corbyn's election as leader, Lansman was a founder of the campaign group Momentum. Before the Labour Party Conference in late September 2015, Lansman was defeated by Michael Cashman and Gloria De Piero in an election for membership of the Conference Arrangements Committee, the body that sets the agenda for the Conference. Lansman is reported to be a supporter of mandatory reselection for Labour MPs.

In October 2015, he denied rumours that he was planning to stand to be the Labour Party candidate in Michael Meacher's constituency of Oldham West and Royton, following Meacher's death.

==== Labour, Israel, Palestinians and Jews ====
Lansman was interviewed by The Jewish Chronicle in January 2016. He was asked about attitudes to Israel in the Labour Party and the attitudes of Jews towards it: "Yes, of course the vast majority of British Jews are supportive of Israel as a Jewish state – and actually so is Jeremy – but they are far from supportive of all aspects of what is currently happening there", he said. "I think Jews in Britain want peace too. I think Jeremy's message of fairness for the Palestinians is not something that will be rejected by the Jewish community."

At the end of April 2016, after long-standing Corbyn ally Ken Livingstone had made comments which led to his suspension from Labour Party membership, Lansman was quoted as saying: "A period of silence from Ken Livingstone is overdue, especially on antisemitism, racism and Zionism. It's time he left politics altogether." A few days later, in early May, he wrote on the Left Futures blog that the use of the term Zionist to describe supporters of the government in Israel was "counter-productive". He cited one poll of British Jews which found 71% favoured a Palestinian state and 75% opposed the Israeli settlements, while 68% still identified as Zionists. A "rational debate about how to change the terms of the current debate" requires, in Lansman's opinion, an acknowledgement "that people on the left may also demonstrate some prejudice of their own."

"I think progress has been uneven; let's put it that way", he said in September 2016. Recent developments in Labour concerning antisemitism have "clearly taken us back as well as forward" he added, citing the Chakrabarti Inquiry as an example of the latter.

In 2018, Lansman criticised the Jewish Voice for Labour group at the Limmud Festival. Lansman argued that "the most influential antisemitism-deniers, unfortunately, are Jewish anti-Zionists" and that JVL "is an organisation which is not just tiny but has no real connection with the Jewish community at all," he said. "It doesn't represent the Jewish community in a way that the Jewish Labour Movement clearly does represent the Labour wing of the Jewish community."

In May 2020, Lansman announced that he would step down as the chairman of Momentum the following month.

In July 2020, Lansman apologised for criticising ex-Labour staffers who had appeared on the BBC's Panorama programme Is Labour Anti-Semitic?, following the party's court settlement with the staffers. Jeremy Corbyn said the settlement was a "political decision, not a legal one", and Momentum said the party should tell members "whether or not these settlements were in line with the legal advice the party received".

==== National Executive Committee ====
In January 2018, Lansman was elected to the Labour Party's National Executive Committee.

The following March, he stood as candidate for the position of Labour's general secretary in succession to Iain McNicol against Jennie Formby, who was backed by Corbyn. However, Lansman withdrew, saying that he had stood to avoid Formby being chosen unopposed and to help end Labour's "command and control" inclinations, and that he had achieved his intention of creating a debate over how the party is managed.

Lansman was reported as standing as the Labour candidate in the new Mousehole, Newlyn and St Buryan division on Cornwall Council in the 2021 local elections, and was even listed on St Ives Labour Party's website, but was never nominated as a candidate for the ward. He was reported to have withdrawn for personal reasons and was not replaced by the local party, where he was political education officer.

=== Post-Corbyn ===
In 2023, Lansman said that he had re-joined the Jewish Labour Movement and was critical of the Palestine Solidarity Campaign (PSC), Britain's largest pro-Palestine group, for using the chant "from the river to the sea" during pro-Palestine protests, saying it was "in denial" about the impact of such slogans on Jews who wish to support Palestine. He also criticised leaders of the PSC for supporting a one-state solution in Israel–Palestine and for its inadequate response to Hamas's attack on Israel on 7 October 2023, as well as criticising elements of the British left for dividing Jews into a binary distinction of Zionists or anti-Zionists, saying "very many who the left might see as 'Zionists' are critical of illegal settlements, the occupation, of the Israeli government and even of the conduct of the present war".

In September 2025, he joined Mainstream, a new soft left pressure group within the Labour Party organised around Andy Burnham.

== Personal life ==
In Lewisham in 1985, Lansman married Bethany Wagstaff. She died of breast cancer as assistant chief executive of Hertfordshire County Council in January 1999, aged 39; the couple had three children. Lansman has been a trustee of the charity, Breast Cancer Care, under whose auspices his wife had set up the Lavender Trust before she died, both to help younger women become aware of the disease and to support them. Lansman's son and brother run a network of property companies.

Lansman is an atheist, although he still observes some Jewish holiday festivals.

Party political offices
New title	Chair of the Momentum; 2015–present	Succeeded by
