= Clayton Swisher =

American journalist (born 1977)

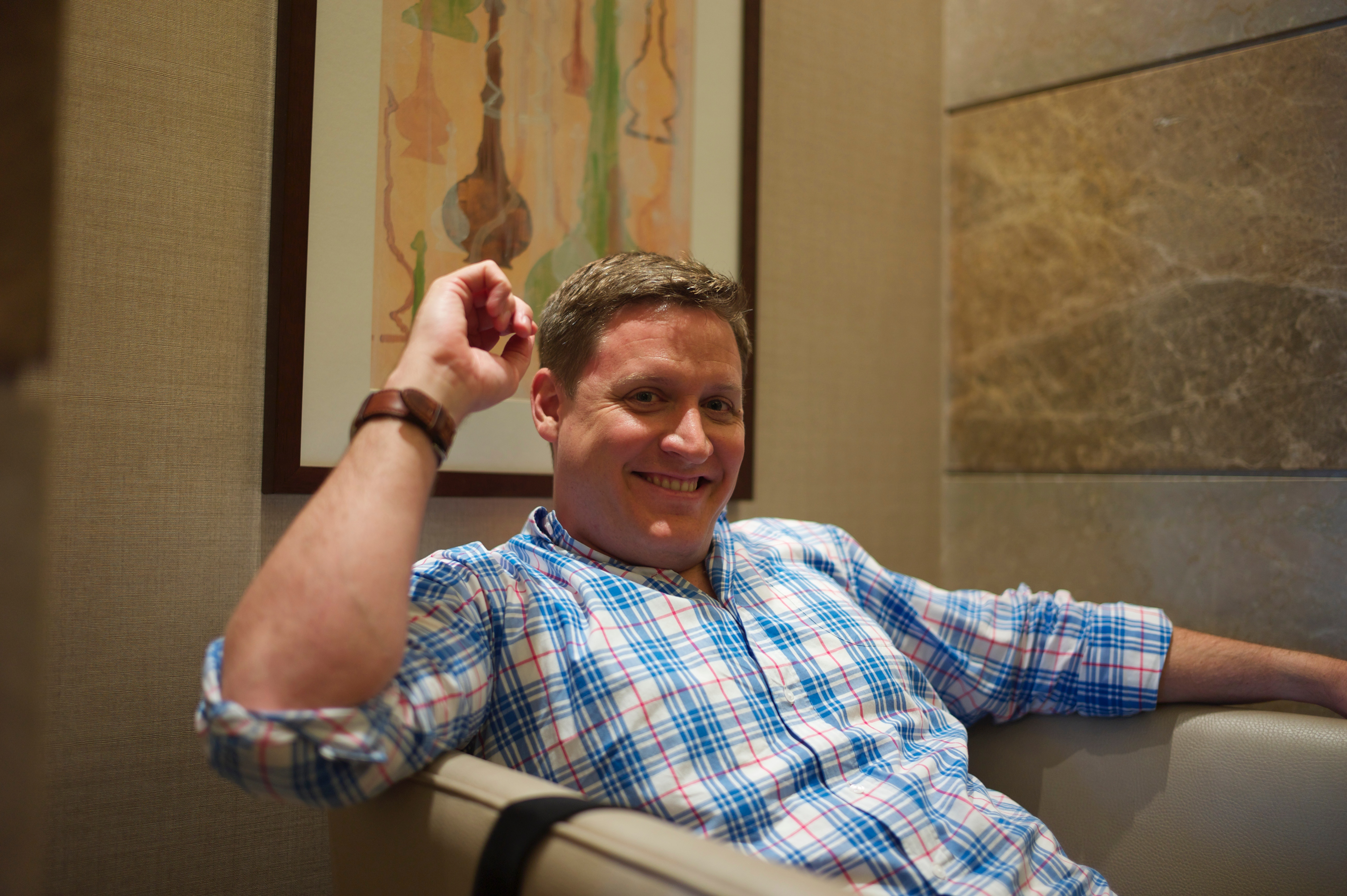
Swisher in 2014.

Clayton Edward Swisher (born 1977) is an American former journalist and author, who now works as a geopolitical risk analyst. Formerly the Director of Investigative Journalism for the Al Jazeera Media Network in Doha, Qatar, he now heads Swisher Empirical Studies LLC, headquartered in Doha.

He is the author of two non-fiction books on the Arab–Israeli conflict.

== Early life and education ==
Swisher grew up in Michigan and later in New Castle, Pennsylvania, where he played football for Neshannock High School. After high school, Swisher attended the University of Pittsburgh. In 1999 he graduated with a bachelor's degree in administration of justice. In 2003 he graduated from Georgetown University with a Master's in Islam & Muslim-Christian Relations.

In 2018 Swisher received a PhD in Middle East Politics from Exeter University under the supervision of notable Israeli Professor Ilan Pappé.

== Background ==
Swisher served in the US Marine Corps reserves and later as a Special Agent with the State Department's Diplomatic Security Service, investigating passport fraud and internal corruption.

Swisher also performed close protection officer duties as a bodyguard for Secretary of State Madeleine Albright and Colin Powell, as well as foreign dignitaries.

Between 2005 and 2007, Swisher transitioned to the think tank and research industry and worked as the Director of Programs with the Middle East Institute in Washington, D.C., where he hosted televised debates concerning US foreign policy toward the Arab world. He was also affiliated with the Council on Foreign Relations as a 5-year term member.

Swisher is a Brazilian jiu-jitsu fighter who competes internationally at the rank of Blue Belt. In 2022, he won a gold medal at the IBJJF European Championship in Rome and later took two bronze medals at the IBJJF Campeonato Brasileiro in São Paulo, the sport's largest annual competition in Brazil.

== Journalism and awards ==
Swisher joined Al Jazeera English in 2007. As a producer and roving reporter, he covered the 2008 US presidential elections, the ongoing Arab-Israeli conflict, ethnic fighting in Kyrgyzstan and between 2009 and 2010 the conflict in Afghanistan.

In 2011, Swisher led the team which produced the "Palestine Papers", described by The Guardian newspaper as "the biggest documentary leak in the history of the Middle East conflict." Robert Fisk said the Palestine Papers "blew open the secret and scandalous American-led negotiations between Israelis and the Palestinian Authority between 2000 and 2010." The Palestine Papers led to the temporary resignation of Dr. Saeb Erekat, Chief PLO Negotiator, who accused Swisher in a live Al Jazeera interview of orchestrating the leak as part of a CIA plot. However, after investigating formal complaints made by Erekat and the PLO, against Swisher and Al Jazeera, the British media regulator Ofcom rejected their claims.

In 2012, Swisher produced and reported for the documentary exclusive "What Killed Arafat". The film won the 2013 CINE Golden Eagle Awards for best Investigative Journalism and received nominations from BAFTA and The Royal Television Society. The nine-month investigation revealed high levels of radioactive Polonium-210 in the clothes and personal effects of former Palestinian leader Yasser Arafat, which he had worn and kept close do him in the final days before his death. This led to a French criminal investigation and the exhumation of Arafat's body.

Swisher reported again on these events in the 2013 follow-up film, Killing Arafat. The forensic investigation and autopsy of Arafat's corpse, conducted by experts from France, Switzerland, and Russia, reached differing conclusions. The Swiss laboratory published a 108-page report concluding the elevated levels of Polonium discovered "moderately support" the hypothesis that Arafat was poisoned. French investigators did not publish their report and ended the criminal investigation by claiming the Polonium traces from Arafat's corpse were instead of a "natural environmental origin". A Russian delegation reported that "Yasser Arafat died not from the effects of radiation but of natural causes".

In October 2017, Swisher was criticized for planting an undercover reporter, James Anthony Kleinfeld, inside pro-Israel organizations in the U.S. and the UK as part of an Al Jazeera documentary series called The Lobby. As a result of Al Jazeera's undercover investigation, in early 2018, Democratic Congressman Josh Gottheimer, of New Jersey and Republican Congressman, Lee Zeldin, of New York, urged President Donald Trump's administration "to open an investigation into Al Jazeera's activities in the U.S. and force the network to register as a foreign agent under the Foreign Agents Registration Act, or FARA." As of 2023, Al Jazeera had not been placed on the FARA list.

For reasons which remain unclear, Al Jazeera decided not to broadcast the second series of The Lobby, which featured Kleinfeld's undercover work. In response, Swisher took a sabbatical from Al Jazeera and accused the network of capitulating to outside pressure from the Qatari government and pro-Israel advocates. Swisher never returned to work at the station.

== Publications ==
Swisher's first book, The Truth About Camp David, was published in 2004. The American academic L. Carl Brown wrote in Foreign Affairs, "Swisher makes a convincing case. This may not be the definitive 'truth about Camp David,' but it warrants careful attention from all who would learn from the history of negotiations to secure peace in the Holy Land." In a review in the Negotiation Journal, David Matz wrote, "Swisher's report is undermined by the prominence and vehemence of his opinions" and that "his heavy-handedness is off-putting."

In 2011, Swisher's second book, The Palestine Papers: The End of the Road? was released, examining the themes of the more than 1,600 leaked documents on the Israeli–Palestinian negotiations, that Swisher had obtained for Al Jazeera.
