= The Lynching =

Play by British activist Jackie Walker

The Lynching: What They Wouldn't Let Jackie Walker Tell You
- Promotional poster
- Original language: English
- Written by: Jackie Walker

Premiere
- Date: 4 August 2017
- Place: Edinburgh Festival Fringe

The Lynching: What They Wouldn't Let Jackie Walker Tell You is a one-person play by British activist Jackie Walker.

== Background ==
The Lynching is a one-woman, 90-minute performance, performed by Jackie Walker and written collaboratively with Norman Thomas. The production focuses on the lives of Walker's activist parents, her own struggles with racism after she came to Britain in the late 1950s, and what happened to her after the Labour Party was enveloped in an antisemitism row. Some of the material on her family also appears in her family memoir Pilgrim State, while her later experience is also covered in the film Witch Hunt.

It is described as "the one woman show about a real-life witchhunt: an attempt to destroy Jeremy Corbyn and an entire political movement." Walker described her treatment by the media as a "political lynching" designed "to smash the most radical political movement we have ever seen". Walker adds: "This show is my chance to tell my side of the story."

== Overview ==
In the show, Walker plays a number of characters including her Jewish communist father, arriving as a refugee in New York around 1918, and her Jamaican-born black civil rights activist mother. Imagining herself on trial for antisemitism, she adopted the character of her mother to put the case for the defence.

== Tour ==
The Lynching had its premiere at Edinburgh Festival Fringe on 4 August 2017.

== Reception ==
In August 2017, the Board of Deputies of British Jews wrote to Edinburgh Council to request that the show be banned from council owned premises.

Alexei Sayle wrote in The Guardian, "Jackie possesses a lovely singing voice and the honed acting skills of a veteran performer, plus the tragic story of her Jewish civil rights campaigner father and her black Jamaican mother, who was wrongly confined to a mental institution in the US, is worth a show in itself. Jackie is also very funny and frank about her own bolshy nature."

Linguist and philosopher Noam Chomsky said: "I wholeheartedly support the right of anyone to criticise Israel without being branded antisemitic. That goes in particular for Jackie Walker".

Lee Levitt of The Jewish Chronicle said the show is an attempt to "justify the views that have made her a controversial figure" and that the opening of her Edinburgh Fringe performance was "greeted by cheers and a standing ovation".

In the Morning Star, Bernadette Hyland described it as "a story which Walker brings to life using song and readings" and "a shocking and sorrowful narrative as we follow her mother and siblings from the US to Jamaica and finally to Britain".

Camden New Journal said of the play, "Billed as a story of black struggle, racism and Jeremy Corbyn, it mixes politics, humour, drama and song, The Lynching invites the audience-as-jury to hear Jackie’s mother defend her daughter."

Ben Fishwick of The News said, "Ms Walker's show, The Lynching, sees the audience act as a jury while her mother 'comes to life' defending her actions."

John Gulliver of The Islington Tribune "found it absorbing and revealing".

== See also ==
- Antisemitism in the UK Labour Party
- Pilgrim State
- Witch Hunt (2019 film)
- The Lobby (TV series)
