= Chris Williamson (politician) =

British politician (born 1956)

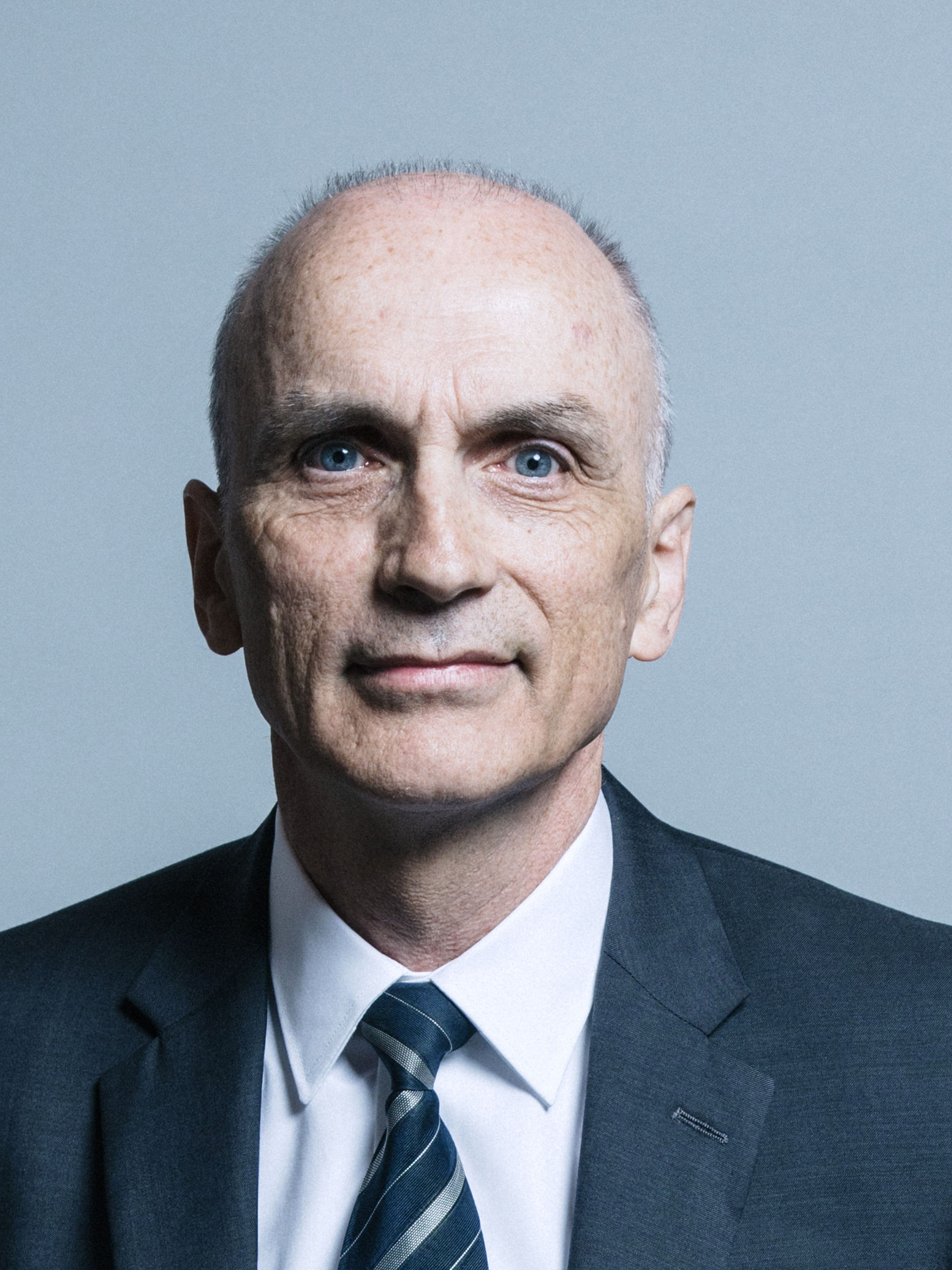
- Official portrait, 2017

Deputy Leader of the Workers Party of Britain
- In office 13 December 2023 – 15 September 2026 Serving with Andy Hudd and Peter Ford
- Leader: George Galloway
- Preceded by: Joti Brar

Shadow Minister for Fire and Emergency Services
- In office 3 July 2017 – 11 January 2018
- Leader: Jeremy Corbyn
- Preceded by: Position established
- Succeeded by: Karen Lee

Member of Parliament for Derby North
- In office 8 June 2017 – 6 November 2019
- Preceded by: Amanda Solloway
- Succeeded by: Amanda Solloway
- In office 6 May 2010 – 30 March 2015
- Preceded by: Bob Laxton
- Succeeded by: Amanda Solloway

Personal details
- Born: Christopher Williamson; 16 September 1956 (age 70) Derby, Derbyshire, England
- Party: Independent
- Other political affiliations: Labour (1976–2019); TUSC (2020–2022); Socialist Labour Party (2022–2023); Workers Party of Britain (2023–2026)
- Spouse: Lonny Wilsoncroft (m. 1997; died 2004)
- Domestic partner: Maggie Amsbury
- Education: Leicester Polytechnic

Christopher Williamson (born 16 September 1956) is a British politician who was the Member of Parliament (MP) for Derby North from 2010 to 2015 and again from 2017 to 2019. He was Shadow Minister for Communities and Local Government from October 2010 to October 2013. Williamson was previously a local councillor in Derby, representing the Normanton ward from 1991 until 2011 and serving twice as leader of Derby City Council.

In February 2019, Williamson was notified of a formal investigation and later suspended from the Labour Party for his comments about the party's response to criticism over its handling of allegations of antisemitism within the party. After an investigation, Williamson was reinstated in June 2019 with a formal warning but was resuspended two days later when the party decided to review the disciplinary decision. In October 2019, Williamson won a High Court challenge to the legality of the review of the disciplinary decision but similar charges had been made on 3 September 2019, involving a further suspension; the High Court ruled the Labour Party's disciplinary procedure with regard to these charges should run its course. In November that year, Labour's National Executive Committee blocked Williamson from standing as a Labour candidate in the 2019 general election. He resigned from the Labour Party and stood as an independent, losing the seat and his deposit.

Williamson currently hosts the programme Palestine Declassified on the Iranian government-owned TV channel PressTV. In December 2023 he was elected Deputy Leader of the Workers Party of Britain, and stood for the party in the Derby South constituency in the 2024 general election, finishing third. He resigned as Deputy Leader in September 2026 in protest of the leadership's decision to contest the 2026 Holborn and St Pancras by-election.

== Early life and career ==
Born in Derby, Williamson attended the St. John Fisher Primary School in Alvaston, Castle Donington High School and St. Thomas More High School in Allenton. After working as a craft apprentice for a year from 1972, Williamson then worked as a bricklayer for six years. He continued his education at Leicester Polytechnic (now De Montfort University), where he obtained a professional social work qualification (a CQSW) in 1985. He was a social worker in Derby from 1983 to 1986 before working as a welfare rights officer.

Williamson joined the Labour Party in 1976. He became a councillor on Derby City Council in 1991. Appointed Chair of Housing, he supported private finance initiative (PFI) projects. Interviewed in 2018, he termed his approach then as "innovative pragmatism", seeking to "be as radical as we possibly could within the confines that we were subjected to by central government", arguing that "It was a bullshit scheme—I wouldn't have chosen it at all. It didn't give value for money. But what were we supposed to do as a local authority? We either [do it or] say we are not going to build these schools or we are not going to refurbish these unfit dwellings."

He became leader of the Labour Group on Derby City Council, serving as leader of the council on two separate occasions. While council leader, Williamson presided over a coalition with the Conservatives for two years after Labour lost its majority in 2006. He was instrumental in setting up Holocaust Memorial Day events in the city.

== Parliamentary career ==
=== First term (2010–2015) ===
In the 2010 general election, Williamson was elected for Derby North with a majority of 613 over the Conservative candidate.

Williamson supported Ed Miliband in the 2010 Labour leadership election.

In October 2010, Williamson became Shadow Fire and Emergency Services Minister within the Shadow Communities and Local Government team after just four months as an MP but, after a reshuffle of the shadow cabinet in 2013, was replaced by Lyn Brown. He served as a member of the Communities and Local Government Committee between July and November 2010 and from November 2013 to March 2015.

In 2014, Williamson voted to support the Cameron coalition's 2011 military intervention in Libya and the British action against ISIS in Iraq. In April 2018, Williamson said that, while he was initially undetermined, he was "naive" to support the votes. He abstained on the Immigration Bill in 2014, following an instruction from Labour whips, saying later: "I have to say—if I'm being honest—I didn't study it enough or fully appreciate the implications."

Williamson was one of 16 signatories of an open letter to Ed Miliband in January 2015 calling on the party to oppose further austerity, take rail franchises back into public ownership and strengthen collective bargaining arrangements.

At the 2015 general election, Williamson lost the Derby North seat to Amanda Solloway of the Conservative Party by 41 votes. Labour Leader Jeremy Corbyn described Williamson in early 2016 as a "very great friend", saying that his defeat at the 2015 general election was "the worst result of that night".

=== Second term (2017–2019) ===
During the 2017 general election campaign, he was described by the New Statesman as the "most pro-Jeremy Corbyn candidate in England's most marginal constituency". Williamson said that his candidacy would be a "test case for Corbynism", and Corbyn campaigned for him. Williamson regained his former seat from Amanda Solloway of the Conservatives with a majority of 2,015 votes.

On 3 July 2017, Williamson was appointed Shadow Fire and Emergency Services Minister. Williamson resigned this role on 11 January 2018. A day earlier he said that council tax on the highest-value homes should be doubled. The comment, which was not party policy and outside his remit, was made without the knowledge of Andrew Gwynne, the shadow secretary of state for communities and local government. When the issue was raised, Williamson, rather than agree to confine his public statements to his own policy area, resigned. He said: "I've taken this decision to bring me closer to the membership of our party and to allow me to work on a broader range of issues, from environmental policy to animal rights and local government."

In April 2018, Williamson voiced doubts that the Syrian government was responsible for the gas attack on Douma. In August 2018, he said it was a "privilege" to hear a talk by a pro-Assad blogger, Vanessa Beeley.

He says that, with Corbyn as leader, the party has "a common-sense socialist" who does not place MPs in the situation of risking being in conflict with the party whips. Williamson said he is "not one for undermining the leadership publicly", explaining the difference between his history in the division lobbies and Corbyn's earlier frequent parliamentary vote rebellions as Corbyn expressing the opinions of party members.

Williamson supported a mandatory reselection process for all Labour MPs. In 2018, Williamson, Fire Brigades Union leader Matt Wrack and ASLEF president Tosh McDonald toured England and Wales to promote this and other internal reforms which would provide "greater democracy and accountability within the party". Williamson said the tour, which was titled The Democracy Roadshow, would promote "common sense socialism" in the Labour movement and "ensure the "transformative" change promised by Mr Corbyn can be delivered in government".

=== Views on handling of antisemitism allegations ===
In 2017, Williamson said that attacks on Corbyn's handling of antisemitism within the Labour Party were "proxy wars and bullshit" and that "I'm not saying it never ever happens but it is a really dirty, lowdown trick, particularly the antisemitism smears. Many people in the Jewish community are appalled by what they see as the weaponisation of antisemitism for political ends." Marie van der Zyl, the Board of Deputies vice-president, said that Williamson should "show solidarity with those suffering racism within his own party rather than blaming the victims". Williamson described antisemitism as being "utterly repugnant and a scourge on society, which is why I stand in absolute solidarity with anyone who is subjected to antisemitic abuse". He added that his critics' "accusations of anti-Semitism (against him) were positively sinister" and "highly offensive and hurtful" in suggesting "that I was an anti-Semite myself, yet I have fought racism all my adult life".

In April 2018, Williamson referenced Ken Livingstone: "We've got these ridiculous suspensions and expulsions from the party" made "in the most grotesque and unfair way". Supporting Len McCluskey, who had accused some Labour MPs of using the issue of antisemitism in campaigning against Corbyn, he described some of his colleagues as "malcontents" who were "completely out of step with party members" and voters, but that deselection of MPs was "a matter for Labour Party members in each constituency and not a matter for me or indeed Len". In January 2019, during a visit to Derbyshire, Jeremy Corbyn defended Williamson, saying that "Chris Williamson is a very good, very effective Labour MP. He's a very strong anti-racist campaigner. He is not anti-semitic in any way."

In his 2022 memoir, Williamson detailed his belief that the Labour Party handled accusations of antisemitism poorly. He characterised the situation as a fake crisis. He has also stated that he would not cave under pressure from what he describes as "a coordinated smear operation by the Zionist lobby", a group in which Williamson, in the view of one reviewer, appears to include "the Community Security Trust, Board of Deputies of British Jews and Jewish Leadership Council, Campaign Against Antisemitism, BICOM and the Jewish Labour Movement".

=== Suspension from Labour Party ===
==== Formal investigation and suspension ====
In February 2019, Williamson was criticised for booking a room in the Houses of Parliament for a screening of Witch Hunt, a film about suspended party member Jackie Walker, to be hosted by Jewish Voice for Labour. At the same time, a video was published by The Yorkshire Post of him telling a Momentum meeting in Sheffield that the party was being "demonised as a racist, bigoted party", partly because, in response to criticism, the party had "given too much ground (and) been too apologetic", going on to say "We've done more to address the scourge of anti-Semitism than any other political party." Labour Deputy Leader Tom Watson said that Williamson should have the Labour whip removed for his comments and a group of 38 Labour MPs had written to the party's General Secretary to ask that he be suspended. There was also pressure from London mayor Sadiq Khan, GMB leader Tim Roache, anti-racism charity HOPE not hate, the Jewish Labour Movement and the Board of Deputies of British Jews. Jewish Voice for Labour defended Williamson, as did the "Labour Against the Witchhunt" pressure group and the Sheffield Hallam constituency branch of the Labour Party who voted 40-to-0 in favour of a motion stating Williamson's comments had been taken out of context. Williamson apologised for his comments saying: "I deeply regret, and apologise for, my recent choice of words when speaking about how the Labour Party has responded to the ongoing fight against antisemitism inside of our party. I was trying to stress how much the party has done to tackle anti-Semitism". On 27 February 2019, he was put under formal notice of investigation, and later that day suspended from the party.

==== Formal warning, resuspension and court challenge ====
Labour readmitted Williamson on 26 June 2019 after a National Executive Committee panel considered his case and issued him with a formal warning. A party source said: "An NEC panel, advised by an independent barrister, found Chris Williamson had breached the party's rules and gave him a formal sanction. He could face further, more severe, action if he repeats any similar comments or behaviour." A Guardian report relying on anonymous interviews with sources close to the NEC suggested that the decision for readmission was made in order to enable Williamson to enter the Labour MP reselection process then underway. The decision to readmit Williamson was criticised by some Labour parliamentarians and parliamentary staff and by two British Jewish remit organisations. Two days later, he was resuspended after the Labour Party decided to review the decision.

In August 2019, Williamson lodged legal papers with the High Court to challenge Labour's right to resuspend him.

On 3 September 2019 additional allegations of misconduct were made against Williamson, resulting in a second suspension being imposed. Williamson's barrister said "It appears from the timing ... that the purpose of the decision to raise these allegations now, and to impose a second suspension on the claimant, is to seek to ensure that he will remain suspended even if this claim is successful and that he will therefore remain disqualified from selection in the forthcoming general election."

On 10 October 2019, the High Court ruled that reopening the first suspension had been unfair and unlawful, but upheld the legality of the second suspension on 3 September on new allegations, saying it was not inherently unfair and the "new disciplinary case must run its course". Williamson recovered his legal costs.

==== Reaction to resuspension ====
In July 2019, the Labour Party in Northern Ireland (LPNI) released a statement opposing the resuspension of Williamson on the grounds that it was "arbitrary and unreasonable" and "the Labour Party does not have any form of particular problem with anti-semitism". In the same month, in a survey of LabourList readers with over 10,000 responses, over two thirds of those expressing a view supported Williamson's readmission. The linguist and activist Noam Chomsky, who is Jewish, told journalist Matt Kennard that there was "nothing even remotely antisemitic" about Williamson's comments in Sheffield, and remarked that the way accusations were being used in cases such as Williamson was "not only a disgrace, but also – to put it simply – an insult to the memory of the victims of the Holocaust." The Campaign for Chris Williamson, established to support him, includes Israeli and British academics, film directors Mike Leigh and Ken Loach, musicians Brian Eno and Roger Waters, journalist John Pilger, actor Miriam Margolyes and comedian Alexei Sayle.

In July 2019, more than one hundred signatories, describing themselves as "all Jews", including Noam Chomsky signed a letter of support for Williamson. The letter was later removed from The Guardian website, after questions were raised about the listed affiliation of some individuals on the list of signatories. Hope not Hate said that the person who used the organisation's name had not been authorised to do so and the Board of Deputies of British Jews said that two of the signatories had promoted 9/11 conspiracy theories.

His speaking events have been controversial. For example, Labour activists criticised his invitation to a trade union meeting in Hull and a talk in Hebden Bridge was cancelled after fears that protests would disrupt a wedding at the same venue. In October 2019, a Methodist church in Downham Market cancelled the booking for a meeting he was due to speak at after "its understanding" of Williamson increased, having not known anything about him at the time of the booking.

An event due to be hosted by Williamson at the Brighthelm Centre in Brighton was cancelled after local MP Peter Kyle contacted the venue to express his concerns over Williamson's alleged antisemitism. A second venue was also cancelled; Williamson said this was after staff were threatened in person and abused in phone calls and on their personal social media accounts. The Board of Deputies of British Jews and the Jewish Leadership Council called a protest against Chris Williamson speaking, with a third venue then cancelling the booking after threats of violence were received. Supporters of the MP talked of the importance of protecting freedom of speech. In response, Williamson said: "The grotesque slurs that Peter Kyle and others have levelled against me are truly despicable. I have a long and proud record of fighting racism, which has always involved standing up for every oppressed and marginalised group in society, including Jewish people. When Peter Kyle was still in nappies, I was an active member of the Anti-Nazi League, physically confronting foul racists and anti-Semites in the National Front." In October 2019, the Union of Jewish Students and the Nottingham Jewish Society demanded that the University of Nottingham cancel a planned lecture by Williamson. The demand was supported by the Jewish Labour Movement and the Board of Deputies of British Jews. The university said "While the university is committed to supporting the well-being of all students within our community, we also have a legal duty to ensure that lawful free speech should not be prevented on campus."

=== 2019 general election ===
Williamson was prevented from standing as the Labour candidate in his Derby North constituency at the 2019 general election as a result of his active suspension. He resigned from the Labour Party and stood instead as an independent candidate. He received 635 votes, losing his deposit and coming bottom of the poll.

== After leaving Parliament ==
=== Resistance Movement ===
Following his resignation from the Labour Party in 2019, Williamson initiated the Resistance Movement, also known as Resist, with the stated aim of fighting for change and social justice for all. An international conference, titled The Resist Festival and intending to feature Lowkey, Noam Chomsky, Max Blumenthal and speakers from the French Yellow vests movement, was planned for June 2020 but postponed due to the COVID-19 pandemic. The Resistance Movement also has a YouTube channel, Resistance TV. Resist was proscribed by the Labour Party in July 2021.

=== EHRC report ===
In October 2020, the Equalities and Human Rights Commission report into antisemitism in the Labour Party did not find that Williamson had contributed to the "unlawful harassment related to Jewish ethnicity" in the Labour Party, which Williamson declared as vindication.

=== Plans for a new party ===
In November 2020, in response to Jeremy Corbyn's suspension from the Labour Party, Williamson announced that he was in discussions with "key labour movement officials and existing left-wing parties" about the possibility of creating a new socialist party. A press release announced that Williamson had joined the Steering Committee of the Trade Unionist and Socialist Coalition (TUSC) as an observer member.

On 2 August 2022, the Electoral Commission registered a new party called System Change, with Williamson as the leader.

=== Workers Party of Britain ===
In July 2023, Williamson joined the Workers Party of Britain. The party has defended Williamson over his suspension from the Labour Party for his comments about antisemitism.

At the party's Congress in December 2023, when George Galloway was re-elected party leader. Williamson was among three deputy leaders elected.

Williamson stood in the Derby South constituency as the Workers Party candidate at the 2024 general election. He finished third with 5,205 votes (behind Labour's Baggy Shanker, another former council leader (14,503) and Reform UK (8,501) and beating the Conservatives (5,192) into fourth place by 12 votes.

Williamson resigned from the Workers Party on 15 September 2026 after Galloway announced his intention to stand in the 2026 Holborn and St Pancras by-election. Williamson stated that he "profoundly disagreed" with the decision and argued the Workers Party should support Zack Polanski's candidacy instead of challenging him.

=== PressTV host ===
Williamson has hosted the television programme Palestine Declassified on the Iranian government-owned TV channel PressTV.

=== Gaza war ===
On 19 October 2023, Derbyshire Police said they had received "multiple reports" about a post by Williamson on X and were considering whether the post was a hate crime. Williamson's post stated "Israel has forfeited any right to exist". In an interview on 8 November, Williamson said in some aspects Israel's actions against Gaza are worse than Nazi Germany. On 18 January 2024, Williamson publicly stated that "Israel must be destroyed."

== Personal life ==
Williamson is teetotal and has been a vegan since 1976. He has a son and a daughter, Fionnbharr and Simone, from an early relationship. He is a member of the League Against Cruel Sports and was its National Chair in 1992. He is a republican.

At the time of the 2010 election, he was vice-chair of the Local Government Anti Poverty Forum.

Parliament of the United Kingdom
Preceded by Bob Laxton	Member of Parliament for Derby North; 2010–2015	Succeeded by Amanda Solloway
Preceded by Amanda Solloway	Member of Parliament for Derby North; 2017–2019	Succeeded by Amanda Solloway
