= Palestine Papers =

Leaked collection of confidential documents about the Israeli–Palestinian peace process

The Palestine Papers is a collection of confidential documents about the Israeli–Palestinian peace process leaked to Al Jazeera, which published them between 23 and 26 January 2011. Nearly 1,700 documents from the office of the main PLO negotiator, Saeb Erekat, and his team have been published, dating from 1999 to 2010.

Both Al Jazeera and The Guardian stated that they have authenticated the documents, and a media adviser to Israeli Prime Minister Ehud Olmert also affirmed their authenticity. Leaders of the Palestinian Authority have complained about the way the documents were presented by Al Jazeera.

== Background ==
The Palestine Papers include documents about the negotiations between the Palestine Liberation Organization (PLO) and the government of Israel that took place intermittently between 1999 and 2010. The negotiations in 1993 that led to the Oslo Accords were the first direct negotiations between the parties. The following "peace process" focused on the formation of the Palestinian Authority (PA) and the territory it would govern. The PA, however, represents only the local people in the Palestinian Territories, not the Palestinians in the diaspora.

In 2011, when the Papers were published, the negotiations were in a deadlock after the refusal in September 2010 of the Benjamin Netanyahu government to extend the freeze of settlements building over ten months. Ziyad Clot, as of 2011 the only identified source, felt frustrated about the fact that the great majority of the Palestinian people, the refugees, being one of the "remaining issues" in the "peace process", were not properly represented.

== Sources of the Papers ==
The documents were obtained by Al Jazeera and shared in advance of publication with The Guardian in an effort to ensure the wider availability of their content. The Guardian has authenticated the bulk of the Papers independently, but has not sought or been given access to the sources of the documents. Al Jazeera, which published the Papers on their website, has redacted minimal parts of the papers to protect their sources' identities.

=== NSU ===
Most of the documents are from the Palestinian negotiation support unit (NSU). The NSU was the PLO's main technical and legal advice organ in the peace negotiations, set up in 1999 and headed by Saeb Erekat. Gershon Baskin, codirector of Israel/Palestinian Center for Research, said, "I'm 100 percent sure that it's a former disgruntled employed" member of the Negotiations Support Unit headed by Palestinian chief negotiator Saeb Erekat. Israel's Channel 10 news show also named the source of the leak as a former member of the NSU.

=== Clayton Swisher ===
On 27 January 2011, following Al Jazeera's broadcast of the Palestine Papers, Saeb Erekat appeared on Al Jazeera Arabic, condemning the publication. He accused Al Jazeera journalist Clayton Swisher, who delivered the disclosure of the Palestine Papers, of being a CIA agent and of working for the NSU. He also said that former British intelligence officer Alastair Crooke was involved. Erakat later admitted to Ma'an News Agency that Clayton Swisher neither worked for the Palestinians nor the US intelligence agency.

A few weeks after the publication of the Palestine Papers, on 11 February 2011, Erekat resigned as Chief PLO Negotiator, citing the release of the papers and due to an internal Palestinian investigation that suggested the Palestine Papers leak had come from a source inside Erekat's office. However, he still held the position of Chief Palestinian Negotiator until his death in November 2020.

In his book The Palestine Papers: The End of the Road?, Swisher confirmed account, as he wrote, "In the fall of 2010, I traveled the world meeting with US, Israeli, and Palestinian Authority officials who had no idea that I held in my possession the secret records of their negotiations". A complaint filed with the UK media regulator Ofcom by Erekat and the PLO against Al Jazeera and Clayton Swisher on grounds of unfairness was wholly dismissed in a 19-page ruling released in October 2011.

=== Ziyad Clot ===
In a 14 May 2011 op-ed article in the Guardian, Ziyad Clot, a French lawyer of Palestinian descent and a former adviser for the NSU involved in 2008 Annapolis negotiations exposed himself as one of the sources of the leaks. In the Guardian article, Clot said that the so-called peace process was "an inequitable and destructive political process which had been based on the assumption that the Palestinians could in effect negotiate their rights and achieve self-determination while enduring the hardship of the Israeli occupation". He also said that "the "peace negotiations" were a deceptive farce whereby biased terms were unilaterally imposed by Israel and systematically endorsed by the US and EU". Clot emphasized that "these negotiations excluded for the most part the great majority of the Palestinian people: the seven million Palestinian refugees". He felt "that the PLO, given its structure, was not in a position to represent all Palestinian rights and interests". Clot resigned from the NSU after he witnessed the killing of more than 1,400 Palestinians in Gaza during the first Gaza War. After he resigned, he believed he had a duty to inform the public. In the Guardian article, he also stated: "In full conscience, and acting independently, I later agreed to share some information with al-Jazeera specifically with regard to the fate of Palestinian refugee rights in the 2008 talks. Other sources did the same, although I am unaware of their identity."

== The documents ==
=== Character of the documents ===
The Palestine Papers include many minutes of bilateral meetings between Israel and the Palestinians and with the US as well as minutes of joint trilateral meetings. They also include other documents, such as memos, emails, letters, strategy papers, a matrix of positions and even maps of possible land swaps and presentation slides.

There were published 1,684 total documents, including:

- 275 sets of meeting minutes;
- 690 internal emails;
- 153 reports and studies;
- 134 sets of talking points and prep notes for meetings;
- 64 draft agreements;
- 54 maps, charts and graphs;
- and 51 "non-papers".

Akiva Eldar, writing in Haaretz, said that the documents are more important than those released by Wikileaks because they deal with current issues regarding permanent borders in the West Bank and East Jerusalem.

=== Settlements ===
At a meeting in November 2007, Tzipi Livni told Ahmed Qurei that "I understand the sentiments of the Palestinians when they see the settlements being built. The meaning from the Palestinian perspective is that Israel takes more land, that the Palestinian state will be impossible, the Israel policy is to take more and more land day after day and that at the end of the day we'll say that it is impossible, we already have the land and cannot create the state".

According to the documents, in a meeting with Livni in Jerusalem, Qurei proposed that Israel annex all settlements along the border except for the large cities and towns of Giv'at Ze'ev, Ma'ale Adumim, Ariel, and Efrat. Livni rejected Qurei's demands that Israel cede these settlements. Qurei suggested to Livni that these settlements be placed under Palestinian sovereignty, but Livni told him "you know this is not realistic". Condoleezza Rice similarly told Qurei that "I don't think that any Israeli leader is going to cede Ma'ale Adumim", to which Qurei replied "or any Palestinian". Rice then told him "Then you won't have a state!"

=== Napkin map ===
"Napkin map" is a colloquial name for a Palestinian sketch made by Palestinian Authority President Mahmoud Abbas on a napkin, of a map with land swap proposals shown to him by then Prime Minister Ehud Olmert during peace negotiations in mid-2008. According to Al Jazeera, Abbas was not allowed to keep the official map, so he sketched it by hand. During the first of several meetings, the Palestinian Authority proposed a land swap, offering Israel the opportunity to annex all of the Israeli settlements in East Jerusalem in return for land concessions by Israel. Olmert, however, offered no concessions in return but an even more aggressive land swap.

In Prime Minister Olmert's own proposal, Israel would annex 6.3% of the West Bank. The land in Olmert's map included the four settlements of Gush Etzion (with Efrat), Ma'ale Adumim, Giv'at Ze'ev, and Ariel, in addition to all settlements in East Jerusalem (Har Homa). In exchange for those concessions by the Palestinian Authority, Olmert offered 5.8% of Israeli land as part of the swap. The land offered consisted of lightly populated farmland, which would be divided between the Gaza Strip and the West Bank. When Mahmoud Abbas asked to keep a copy of the map for further consideration, Ehud Olmert refused. Mahmoud Abbas sketched Ehud Olmert's map by hand on a napkin to have a copy for further consideration. This map was then later referred to as the Napkin map.

The third and final meeting occurred on 16 September 2008. It was during this time that Ehud Olmert was nearing the end of his political career. At the time, Olmert was under police investigation for alleged corruption that had occurred while he was Mayor of Jerusalem, and as a result of the accusations was not planning on running again. During the final meeting, Mahmoud Abbas was prepared by the Negotiation Support Unit (NSU) to clarify many questions regarding Ehud Olmert's peace plan in which Abbas was quoted as asking questions such as "How do you see it addressing our interests, especially as Ariel, Maale Adumim, Givat Zeev, Har Homa and Efrat clearly prejudice contiguity, water aquifers, and the viability of Palestine?" as well as others about the value of the land that they would receive in such a swap in terms of value and size.

The Negotiation Support Unit (NSU) also insisted that Prime Minister Olmert provide them with a copy of the map, which was again denied. In the end, however, Mahmoud Abbas asked for a few days to consider the offer. A day after this meeting, Olmert resigned and Tzipi Livni stepped in as Acting Prime Minister, with Benjamin Netanyahu being elected shortly afterward. Palestinian negotiators said Abbas had forgotten another appointment and postponed the next meeting. Netanyahu thought Olmert had made too many concessions and refused to continue from where the last round of negotiations had left off, preferring to restart the negotiations from the beginning.

=== Jerusalem ===
According to one of the documents, the Palestinian Authority was prepared to concede most Israeli settlements in East Jerusalem, as well as the Armenian Quarter, with the exception of Har Homa. The Temple Mount would be temporarily administrated by a joint body consisting of the Palestinian Authority, Israel, Egypt, Jordan, Saudi Arabia, and the United States until a permanent solution was reached.

At the meeting in Jerusalem in November 2007, Tzipi Livni became visibly angry when asked about the demographic composition of the future Israeli state. She was quoted as saying, "Israel the state of the Jewish people—and I would like to emphasize the meaning of 'its people' is the Jewish people—with Jerusalem the united and undivided capital of Israel and of the Jewish people for 3,007 years". The Palestinians team then protested her position on Jerusalem. She responded by saying "Now I have to say, before we continue, in order to continue we have to put out Jerusalem from your statement and from our place. We have enough differences, without putting another one out there".

=== Security ===
The minutes of the trilateral meeting on 26 August 2008 reveal that Israel not only demands a "demilitarized" Palestinian state, but also wants to keep control over borders, Jordan Valley and airspace, after withdrawal of the Israeli forces from the West Bank, for reasons of security. Tzipi Livni: "In the Jordan Valley – what will be between Palestine and Jordan. EWS. [Early Warning Stations] ... the I is that we will have something on the crossings, borders, etc ... The idea is to withdraw, but to keep a presence, not close to the situation today, on the EWS, on passages ..."

=== Refugees ===
Yankie Galenty, a media adviser for Ehud Olmert, affirmed the complete authenticity of the documents in an interview. In regards to refugees, he stated that "Olmert, from day one, did not deceive Abu Mazen and told him that Israel will not allow the return of refugees and not one refugee will return to the land of Israel."

Other officials in the Israeli government asked for a limited right of return numbering between five and ten thousand, out of a total of five million refugees, who would be carefully picked by Israel and allowed to stay under "humanitarian conditions".

US Secretary of State Condoleezza Rice proposed settling Palestinians refugees in Argentina and Chile as an alternative to letting them return to former homes in Israel and the occupied territories during a meeting.

In her memoirs, Condoleezza Rice wrote that Olmert initially proposed that Israel accept 5,000 Palestinians refugees. Abbas rejected the offer, saying, "I can't tell four million Palestinians that only 5,000 of them can go home". According to the second night of the Al-Jazeera broadcast, Israelis and Palestinians eventually agreed that Israel would accept 10,000 refugees.

== Reactions ==
=== Palestinian Authority ===
Palestinian President Mahmoud Abbas said the leaked documents deliberately confuse Israeli and Palestinian positions, and that he had kept the Arab League updated on all details of the negotiations with Israel. Chief Palestinian negotiator Saeb Erekat said the leaks were "a pack of lies", containing mistakes and inaccuracies and that his words were taken out of context and he had been misquoted. Erekat said that the "Palestinian Authority would never give up any of our rights. If we did indeed offer Israel the Jewish and Armenian Quarters of Jerusalem, and the biggest Yerushalayim as they claim, then why did Israel not sign a final status agreement? Is it not strange that we would offer all these concessions which Israel demands, yet there is still no peace deal?"

Yasser Abed Rabbo, giving the PA's first official response, accused Al Jazeera and the Government of Qatar of attacking the Palestinian Authority, having a hostile attitude towards the PA since the days of former president Yasser Arafat. Abed Rabbo was quoted saying that the Al-Jazeera leaks are "a distortion of the truth". Abed Rabbo accused the Emir of Qatar, Sheikh Hamad bin Khalifa al-Thani, of giving Al Jazeera the "green light" to start the campaign, and called on the Emir to "extend the climate of transparency in his own state and reveal his true relations with Israel and Iran".

Mahmoud al-Zahar, a senior Hamas official in Gaza, stated that the Palestinian Authority officials should be ashamed of themselves.

Ahmed Qurei, former Prime Minister of the Palestinian Authority and chief Palestinian negotiator in the 2008 talks, said that "many parts of the documents were fabricated, as part of the incitement against the Palestinian Authority and the Palestinian leadership".

Nasser Gawi, a lead organizer for demonstrations in the Jerusalem neighborhood of Sheikh Jarrah, where he had been recently evicted by Israeli settlers from his home, was quoted as saying "Erekat must have become more Zionist than Zionist. He has no mandate to give up Sheikh Jarrah or an inch of Palestine."

=== Israel ===
Israeli Foreign Minister Avigdor Lieberman said that "even the most left-wing government of Olmert and Livni did not manage to reach a peace agreement, despite the many concessions." He also promoted his plan for peace, which would allocate 45% to 50% of the West Bank for the creation of a Palestinian state.

Livni said that "the [peace] process did not fail and was not exhausted. It did not end, but was not allowed to ripen until an agreement was reached because of elections in Israel and this government's choice not to continue the negotiations."

== See also ==
- Annapolis Conference
- United States diplomatic cables leak, also known as Cablegate
- Iraq War documents leak, also known as the Iraqi War Logs
- Afghan War documents leak
- Israeli retaliation leak
