= Labour Representation Committee (2004) =

British socialist pressure group within the Labour Party and wider labour movement

- Abbreviation: LRC
- Formation: 3 July 2004; 22 years ago
- Purpose: Socialist pressure group within the Labour Party and wider labour movement
- Region served: United Kingdom
- President: John McDonnell
- Chair: Matt Wrack
- Vice-Chair: Claire Wadey
- Treasurer: Alison McGarry
- Key people: Political secretary: Mick Brooks Membership secretaries: Keith Henderson; Adam Thompson Administrator: Michael Calderbank
- Parent organisation: Labour Party
- Affiliations: Centre-Left Grassroots Alliance
- Website: https://labourrep.com

The Labour Representation Committee (LRC) is a British socialist pressure group within the Labour Party and wider labour movement. It is often seen as representing the most left-wing members of the Labour Party.

== Overview ==
The LRC was formed at a founding conference on Saturday 3 July 2004, taking its name from the original Labour Representation Committee, formed in February 1900.

The LRC encourages Constituency Labour Parties (CLPs) and Branch Labour Parties (BLPs) to affiliate, along with local, regional and national unions, and individual party members and supporters. It has around 150 affiliates and 1000 individual members. In parliament, the group is represented by the Socialist Campaign Group. The LRC also has a youth group, the Socialist Youth Network.

The President is John McDonnell, the MP for Hayes and Harlington. In July 2024, McDonnell had the Labour whip suspended after voting for an SNP amendment calling for the abolition of the two-child benefit cap; the whip was reinstated in September 2025.

According to LRC affiliate Socialist Appeal, in November 2014: "The Labour Representation Committee has lost a third of its members and is now down to 600 – in a party of 190,000. It is teetering on the verge of collapse." Despite this claim, LRC members were involved in launching the activist Socialist Campaign for a Labour Victory in early 2015.

== LRC Youth ==
LRC Youth is a section of the LRC for those aged 27 and under. It was founded as the Socialist Youth Network in March 2007 and relaunched in 2012 under its current name.

== National Committee ==
The National Committee is elected annually by delegates to the LRC's annual general meeting. Its members are elected for 12 months to conduct general business between annual general meetings. It is responsible for electing, and holding to account, an Executive Committee, which is responsible for any general business between meetings of the National Committee. The National Committee is also responsible for the preparation of publications, and for appointing delegates to represent the LRC.

The current National Committee is elected at the LRC's annual general meeting in November, and its membership is as follows:

	2009	2012
Section A: Officers	Chair: John McDonnell MP; Vice Chairs: Maria Exall and Susan Press; Secretary: Pete Firmin and Andrew Fisher (job share); Treasurer: Graham Bash	Chair: John McDonnell MP; Vice Chairs: Susan Press and Marshajane Thompson; Secretary: Pete Firmin and Andrew Fisher (job share); Treasurer: Graham Bash; Organiser: Lizzie Woods
Section B: Individual members	Simeon Andrews; Andrew Berry; Stephanie David; Jenny Fisher; Val Graham; Owen Jones; Jon Lansman; Caroline Lenegham; Jenny Lennox; John Moloney; Mary Partington; Mike Phipps; Francis Prideaux; Jon Rogers; Marsha Jane Thompson; Louise Whittle	Andrew Berry; Austin Harney; Jenny Lennox; Rhiannon Lowton; Mike Phipps; Francis Prideaux; Lizzie Woods
Section C: General Affiliates	Judy Atkinson (Unite West London Medical Branch); Stephen Brown (LRC Northern Region); Tricia Clarke (Islington LRC); Lesley Hammond (Unite Croydon and Crystal Palace Branch); Gary Heather (Islington North CLP); Ted Knight (Croydon TUC); Rory MacQueen (Hackney LRC); Norrette Moore (Greater London LRC); Gordon Nardell (Lambeth and Southwark LRC); Janet Oosthuysen (West Yorkshire LRC); Christine Shawcroft (Notts NUM Ex and Retired Miners Association); Jeff Slee (RMT Deptford Branch); Nick Toms (Lambeth and Southwark LRC); Cathy Watson (Unite North London Branch); Matthew Wells (Cambridge LRC); Adam White (Greater Manchester LRC); John Wiseman (Unite Liverpool Branch)	Judy Atkinson (Unite West London Medical branch); Kevin Bennett (Unite Liverpool 0538 branch); Sharon Connor (Unite Liverpool 0538 branch); Maria Exall (CWU Greater London Combined branch); Gary Heather (Islington North CLP); Jon Lansman (Labour CND); Jon Rogers (Unison Labour Left); Steve Turner (Unite Liverpool 0538 branch); John Wiseman (Unite Liverpool 0538 branch)
Section D: Equality seats	n/a	BME: Earl Jenkins; BME: Jackie Walker; Disability: Val Graham; Disability: John Sweeney; LGBT: Paul Clark; LGBT: Hannah Thompson; Youth: Rachel Mullan
Section E: Affiliated National Trade Unions	ASLEF: Mark Daniels and Andy Viner; BFAWU: Joe Marino and Tony Richardson; CWU: Peter Keenlyside and Dave Warren; FBU: Mick Shaw and Matt Wrack	ASLEF: Mark Daniels; BFAWU: Ian Hodson and John Fox; CWU: Mick Kavanagh and Peter Keenlyside; FBU: Dave Green and Matt Wrack; NUM: to be advised; RMT: to be advised
Section E: LRC Sister Organisations	CfS: Vince Mills; WLG: Nick Davies / Darren Williams (job share)	CfS: Mike Cowley; WLG: Nick Davies / Darren Williams (job share)
Section F: Local LRCs	n/a	Calderdale LRC: Mark Catterall; Croydon LRC: tbc; Ealing & Hounslow LRC: Mick Brooks; Essex LRC: tbc; Greater London LRC: Norrette Moore; Hackney LRC: Lois Radice; Hampshire LRC: tbc; Haringey LRC: tbc; Islington LRC: Tricia Clarke; Lambeth & Southwark LRC: tbc; Leeds LRC: Patrick Hall; North East & Cumbria LRC: Ben Sellers / Terry McPartlan (job share); North West LRC: Andy Birchall / Thomas Butler (job share); Nottinghamshire LRC: tbc; Sussex LRC: Claire Wadey; Waltham Forest LRC: tbc

== Affiliated unions ==
The LRC maintains support from a number of trade unions, the most prominent of these being:

- ASLEF
- BFAWU
- Communication Workers Union
- Fire Brigades Union
- NUM
- RMT

== Affiliated Constituency Labour Parties ==
- Ashton-under-Lyne CLP
- Brentford and Isleworth CLP
- Chingford and Woodford Green CLP
- Delyn CLP
- Ilford South CLP
- Isle of Wight CLP
- Islington North CLP
- Leeds Central CLP
- Leyton and Wanstead CLP
- St Helens South CLP

== Affiliated Branch Labour Parties ==
- Bloomsbury and Kings Cross BLP
- Brislington East BLP
- Henleaze BLP
- Hastings and Rye East BLP
- Kensal Green BLP
- Newport and West Wight BLP
- Sutton BLP

== Other affiliated organisations ==
- Campaign for Socialism (Scotland)
- Momentum (organisation)
- Keep Our NHS Public
- Reclaiming Education
- People's Assembly Against Austerity
- Free Speech on Israel
- Jewish Voice for Labour
- Labour Against the Witchhunt
- Jewish Socialist Group
- Hands off the People of Iran

== See also ==
- Compass (think tank)
- Socialist Campaign Group
- Socialist Campaign for a Labour Victory
