= Ian Saville =

British magician (born 1953)

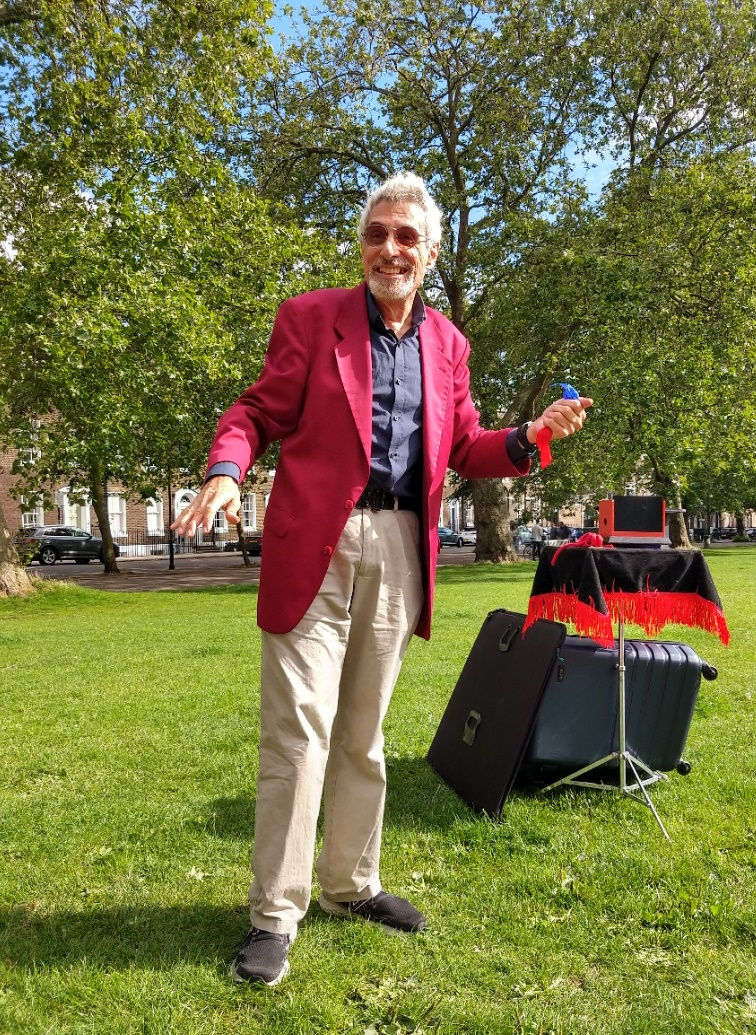
- Ian Saville, 8 August 2023
- Born: 30 April 1953 (age 73)
- Education: University of Exeter; City, University of London
- Occupations: Magician, ventriloquist, comedian
- Years active: 1979–present
- Employer: Middlesex University
- Political party: Labour
- Website: www.redmagic.co.uk

Ian Saville (born 30 April 1953) is a British magician whose act incorporates ventriloquism and comedy. His performance is distinctive primarily for the fact that it is geared towards a comic form of socialist propaganda. He says of his act, "whereas David Copperfield is content with little tricks like making the Statue of Liberty disappear, I aim at the much more ambitious goal of making International Capitalism and exploitation disappear".

== Life and career ==
Saville was born in the East End of London, England, to Jewish parents. He began conjuring at the age of 11. He reached the semi-finals of the Butlins national talent contest. Becoming interested in theatre, he studied drama at the University of Exeter. He toured with the political theatre group Broadside, as well as working in community theatre.

In 1979, Saville started developing what he calls his "socialist magic" act. He cites Bertolt Brecht as a major influence, and one of his shows features a ventriloquists' dummy of Brecht. He has collaborated with left-wing folk singer Leon Rosselson in two shows. Two of his standard tricks are "The Class Struggle Rope Trick" and "The vanish of the military-industrial complex".

In 1990, Saville received a PhD from City University, London, for his thesis on political theatre in Britain in the 1920s and 1930s. He teaches part-time on theatre courses at Middlesex University. In August 2013, he visited the Edinburgh Festival Fringe with a free show about money: the Free Money Magic Show.

== Politics ==
Saville's Edinburgh show in 2016 was Revolution in the Magic Square, an allegory on the rise of Jeremy Corbyn. Saville is a member of Brent Central's Constituency Labour Party. On 20 September, he performed at the Keep Corbyn rally in Brighton in support of Corbyn's campaign in the 2016 Labour Party leadership election.
