= Jewish Voice for Liberation =

British political organisation

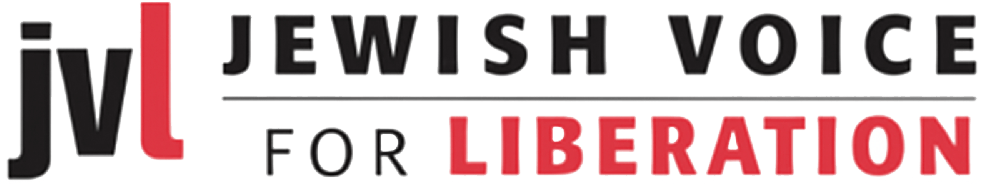
- Abbreviation: JVL
- Formation: 19 July 2017; 9 years ago
- Location: United Kingdom
- Co-chairs: Jenny Manson; Leah Levane
- Affiliations: Centre-Left Grassroots Alliance
- Website: jewishvoiceforlabour.org.uk

Jewish Voice for Liberation (JVL), founded as Jewish Voice for Labour in 2017 for Jewish members of the Labour Party, is a British organisation that describes itself as "a Jewish-led organisation for members of the labour, trade union, socialist and progressive movements... internationalist, anti-Zionist and anti-racist".

== Membership ==
JVL admits full membership only to Labour Party members who identify as Jewish. In August 2019, JVL said that it had full members in a quarter of constituency Labour parties. All other members are associate members without voting rights, as the constitution specifies that the organisation is led by Jewish people and only they can vote on its policies. JVL does not make promoting the centrality of Israel to Jewish life a condition of membership, which is a requirement for membership of the JLM. Committee member Ian Saville said: "There is no ideological test to join." Saville added that it is "a group for Jews in the Labour Party that would welcome all Jews, whatever their attitude to Israel".

== Affiliations ==
Naomi Wimborne-Idrissi said the organisation's "longer term aim" could be to affiliate to Labour as a socialist society. Several constituency Labour parties have affiliated to JVL, and the organisation has been endorsed by leaders of Labour Party affiliated trade unions, namely Len McCluskey, who is the general secretary of Unite the Union, and Tosh McDonald, the president of ASLEF. JVL is affiliated to both the Campaign for Labour Party Democracy and the Centre-Left Grassroots Alliance (CLGA). Additionally, the organisation formed a coalition with Red Labour and the Labour Representation Committee, both of which are members of the CLGA.

In December 2017, The Times of Israel wrote that JVL was closely linked to Free Speech on Israel (FSOI), which was founded in 2016 to "counter the manufactured moral panic over a supposed epidemic of anti-Semitism in the UK". FSOI opposes Zionism and the notion that anti-Zionism is antisemitism. Wimborne-Idrissi said JVL and FSOI are "two separate organizations with different aims and objectives".

Wimborne-Idrissi, the founder of JVL and a member of the National Executive Committee of the Labour Party, was excluded from the Labour Party in December 2022.

== Assessment ==
Len McCluskey called the formation of JVL a "positive move forward". David Rosenberg, author and founding member of the Jewish Socialists' Group, described JVL as "a broader, more inclusive, more open-minded group—not fixated on defending Israel". Then Labour Party leader Jeremy Corbyn said JVL are "committed to fighting anti-Semitism and making sure there is a Jewish voice in the party. We already have the Jewish Labour Movement. JVL was established last year and I think it is good that we have organisations within the party that are giving that voice to people." Writer Richard Seymour described the organisation as "rooted in radical and revolutionary internationalism". Stephen Sedley stated that "pro-Israeli groups such as the Jewish Labour Movement [are] seeking to drive out pro-Palestinian groups like the Jewish Voice for Labour by stigmatising them."

The organisation has attracted controversy, including from The Jewish Chronicle and The Times of Israel. The Jewish Labour Movement (JLM) called its views an "extreme fringe". Jewish Leadership Council chairman Jonathan Goldstein said that JVL is "not representative of our community". Marie van der Zyl, president of the Board of Deputies of British Jews, referred to JVL as "a tiny organisation whose odious views are representative of no-one but themselves". Jon Lansman, founder of Momentum, stated that JVL "is an organisation which is not just tiny but has no real connection with the Jewish community at all". Lansman added: "It doesn't represent the Jewish community in a way that JLM clearly does represent the Labour wing of the Jewish community." Luke Akehurst, director of We Believe in Israel and secretary of Labour First, has called for JVL to be proscribed.

== History ==
=== Launch ===
Jewish Voice for Labour was inaugurated in July 2017, and Jenny Manson, an activist in Jews for Justice for Palestinians and former Labour councillor, was elected chair. The organisation was officially launched on 24 September 2017, on the second day of the Labour Party Conference in Brighton, with over 300 people in attendance according to JVL. The launch featured historian and Oxford University professor of international relations Avi Shlaim, former Court of Appeal judge Stephen Sedley, and the Jewish Socialists' Group's David Rosenberg.

JVL described itself as a "network for Jewish members of the Labour Party" that "stand for rights and justice for Jewish people everywhere and against wrongs and injustice to Palestinians and other oppressed people anywhere". The organisation's founding statement advocated "making the Labour Party an open, democratic and inclusive party, encouraging all ethnic groups and cultures to join and participate freely", and to support a commitment "to strengthen the party in its opposition to all forms of racism, including antisemitism". Its aims were set out in a statement of principles, which include a commitment "to strengthen the party in its opposition to all forms of racism, including antisemitism, to uphold the right of supporters of justice for Palestinians to engage in solidarity activities", and "to oppose attempts to widen the definition of antisemitism beyond its meaning of hostility towards, or discrimination against, Jews as Jews".

Although JVL has been described as anti-Zionist, Manson said the organisation is not anti-Zionist, and stated that it was "an alternative voice for Jewish members of Labour" who do not support what she described as the "profoundly Zionist orientation" of the Jewish Labour Movement (JLM). JVL's information officer Jonathan Rosenhead said he shared the latter opinion. Glyn Secker, the organisation's secretary, wrote that JVL has "established a very different, authentic, radical, and socialist Jewish narrative to that promulgated by the Jewish Labour Movement and Labour Friends of Israel". JVL's media officer Naomi Wimborne-Idrissi wrote that one of JVL's roles is "to clarify the distinction between Jew, Israeli and Zionist so that people are less likely to fall into antisemitic generalisation when talking about Israel's role in Palestine", to offer "an alternative to the JLM's pro-Israel agenda", and that the JLM does not have "the right to speak as the Jewish Labour Movement on behalf of all Jews in the Labour party". Co-chairs Jenny Manson and Leah Levane contend that the JLM cannot represent all Jewish Labour members when it is committed "to promote the centrality of Israel in Jewish life", as well as the wider Jerusalem Programme of the World Zionist Organization.

The organisation's motto is "Always with the oppressed; never with the oppressor", which paraphrases a quote by Marek Edelman, the last surviving commander of the Warsaw Uprising.

JVL defended former London mayor Ken Livingstone, supported Jackie Walker, whom they described as being a victim of a "vituperative campaign... based on this sliver of quasi-fact", deemed accusations of antisemitism against Moshé Machover as "ill founded", opposed and condemned the expulsion of Marc Wadsworth, who they said was being "punished in advance of investigation and hearing of the case", welcomed the lifting of Derby North MP Chris Williamson's suspension, and called the National Executive Committee's ruling not to endorse him as a Labour candidate for the 2019 United Kingdom general election a "dangerous development for everyone who stands for justice for Palestinians and for democracy and freedom of expression in Britain, including within Labour".

=== 2017 ===
At the 2017 Labour Party Conference, JVL supported Hastings and Rye constituency Labour Party's proposal to change the Labour Party Rule Book to add a clause that makes it clear that antisemitism will not be tolerated, whilst clarifying that "hatred of Jews shall not be evidenced by non-abusive words or actions regarding Israel or Zionism that are part of legitimate political discourse." The organisation opposed the International Holocaust Remembrance Alliance's working definition of antisemitism being formally adopted by the Labour Party for disciplinary purposes at the party conference held in September, which it sees as "attempts to widen the definition of antisemitism beyond its meaning of hostility towards, or discrimination against, Jews as Jews". JVL saw the rule change, which was supported by Jeremy Corbyn, as an "anti-democratic restriction on political debate".

=== 2018 ===
JVL challenged "unjustified allegations of antisemitism" within the party, which they said were "used to undermine Jeremy Corbyn's leadership". In March, JVL organised a smaller counter-demonstration, attended by around 30 people according to The Independent, at a protest against antisemitism in the Labour Party, held in Parliament Square, London. In a statement, JVL said it was appalled by an open letter, issued jointly by the Board of Deputies of British Jews and the Jewish Leadership Council, which said to Labour MPs that there was a "repeated institutional failure" to properly address antisemitism. The organisation responded: "They do not represent us or the great majority of Jews in the party who share Jeremy Corbyn's vision for social justice and fairness. Jeremy's consistent commitment to anti-racism is all the more needed now." JVL added: "There is massively more antisemitism on the right of politics than on the left. Any organisation claiming to represent Jews in the Labour Party should be holding up for criticism, the senior ex adviser to the Prime Minister who recently used a national newspaper to dredge up antisemitic conspiracy theories, and the local Conservative party which issued a dogwhistle leaflet aiming to mobilise racism in their local election campaign. The Board of Deputies and the Jewish Leadership Council have been silent on both. They have nothing to say either on the global rise of the far right and the toxic anti-immigrant rhetoric of the tabloid press. Jewish history surely gives us an imperative to speak out against both racism and fascism."

JVL chair Jenny Manson defended Corbyn on BBC's Daily Politics, saying Corbyn had taken "enormously strong action" to deal with the issue of antisemitism in the Labour Party. In April, Manson appeared on BBC Radio 4's Today programme. Referring to a survey conducted by the Campaign Against Antisemitism, she said: "Evidence, including very recent evidence, commissioned by a Jewish body suggests the very worst antisemitism is still on the right, on the far right and always has been." In the same month, JVL issued a statement saying they "strongly condemn the Israeli army's violent response to the Land Day demonstration in Gaza, killing 15 Palestinian civilians and wounding hundreds more", and called "for an unconditional end to Israel's inhuman siege of Gaza and its brutal occupation of the West Bank which has destroyed the lives of generations of Palestinians."

In May, JVL with members of Free Speech on Israel produced the following definition of antisemitism: "Antisemitism is a form of racism: hatred, hostility, discrimination or prejudice against Jews because they are Jews. It may be manifested in violence; denial of rights; direct, indirect or institutional discrimination; prejudice-based behaviour; or verbal or written statements. Such manifestations draw on stereotypes – characteristics which all Jews are presumed to share." The Labour Party's code of conduct definition of antisemitism was adopted by the National Executive Committee (NEC) for the purposes of disciplinary cases brought before the National Constitutional Committee. In July, JVL said that Labour's code of conduct "offers a constructive framework for moving forward in this difficult area" and encouraged "free speech on issues to do with Israel and its treatment of the Palestinians, and with Zionism." They added that "much will depend on how this code of conduct is applied in practice, particularly in disciplinary cases. We are cautiously optimistic." In the same month, JVL was one of 41 Jewish organisations in 15 countries, including six in the United Kingdom, to criticise the IHRA definition of antisemitism.

In August, the organisation called for support of Labour's existing code of conduct, as well as for the NEC to resist adopting the IHRA examples of antisemitism as it fell short of providing "a clear and unambiguous statement based on attitudes to Jews as Jews, not attitudes to a country, Israel". JVL asked its members for help in delivering an "expanded programme" of antisemitism training to party members in response to what it called a "growing number of requests". In the same month, JVL complained to BBC director-general Tony Hall and the BBC's news and current affairs director Francesca Unsworth about what they described as the broadcaster's "lack of impartiality and inaccuracies" and biased coverage of Labour MP Margaret Hodge's allegations of antisemitism against Corbyn.

In September, JVL and Free Speech on Israel published a joint declaration on antisemitic misconduct. JVL contributed to the consultation on Labour's code of conduct by rejecting suggestions that comparisons between Israel and "features of pre-war Nazi Germany" or apartheid-era South Africa were "inherently antisemitic", arguing: "Drawing such parallels can undoubtedly cause offence; but potent historical events and experiences are always key reference points in political debate. Such comparisons are anti-Semitic only if they show prejudice, hostility or hatred against Jews as Jews." The JVL's guidelines on antisemitism included the view that "Jews, Israelis and Zionists are separate categories that are too frequently conflated by both supporters and critics of Israel. This conflation can be anti-Semitic. Holding all Jews responsible for the actions of the Israeli government is anti-Semitic. Many Jews are not Zionist." The organisation also suggested that "discussion and education, rather than a formal disciplinary approach" could be more appropriate in some cases of antisemitism.

At the 2018 Labour Party Conference, JVL hosted two events: "Israel/Palestine: Antisemitism" and "Fighting the Far Right". JVL also organised and hosted the premiere of the documentary film The Political Lynching of Jackie Walker, from which 200 people were evacuated after a bomb threat. In a statement, the organisation said the film "is an incisive and chilling exposé of attempts to silence critics of Israel, in particular those who support the socialist project of Labour leader Jeremy Corbyn. It connects the global struggle against racism and the far right with the Palestinian cause."

=== 2019 ===
In February, over 200 Jewish members and supporters of Labour signed a JVL open letter calling the party under Corbyn an "a crucial ally in the fight against bigotry and reaction", and pointed to Corbyn's consistent campaigning in support of "initiatives against antisemitism". They also welcomed Labour's support for "freedom of expression on Israel and on the rights of Palestinians". They felt that there was a "disproportionate focus on antisemitism on the left, which is abhorrent but relatively rare". The signatories included David B. A. Epstein, Mike Leigh, Michael Rosen, Avi Shlaim, Gillian Slovo, Annabelle Sreberny, Walter Wolfgang, Peter Buckman, Erica Burman, Keith Burstein, Miriam David, Michael Ellman, Nick Foster, Susan Himmelweit, Selma James, Ann Jungman, Frank Land, Gillian McCall, Helen Pearson, and Ian Saville. In July, JVL criticised BBC Panorama documentary Is Labour Anti-Semitic?, about which the organisation said: "It is shameful that the BBC has joined in an orchestrated campaign whose principal aim is quite clearly to prevent Jeremy Corbyn becoming prime minister of a Labour government committed to socialism."

In August, JVL welcomed the investigation by the Equality and Human Rights Commission (EHRC) into the handling of antisemitism by the Labour Party. The organisation submitted a dossier in response to the EHRC's request for evidence. JVL held that, by failing to make public the initial complaints they received justifying the investigation and Labour's initial response to the EHRC, the EHRC violated the Equality Act 2006, which requires that they specify who is being investigated and "the nature of the unlawful act" they are suspected of committing, both required by its own terms of reference. Signatories to JVL's letter included Oxford University professor Avi Shlaim and human rights lawyer Geoffrey Bindman. In the same month, JVL stated that "pressure was put on organisers" of the Greenbelt Festival, which withdrew an invitation to one of its co-chairs, Leah Levane, to sit on a panel. The Festival said that it "must make it clear that Leah was not coming as a representative or spokesperson for the Jewish community in the UK". Similar venue denying campaigns were mounted against Momentum activist Jackie Walker, Chris Williamson, who was suspended as MP, and Labour Against the Witchhunt.

At the 2019 Labour Party Conference, JVL organised a "Let's Talk About Palestine" event attended by 200 people at the Mercure Hotel featuring JVL's political officer Graham Bash, Israeli historian Ilan Pappé, and former Palestinian Knesset member Haneen Zoabi. In October, JVL commended the definition of antisemitism issued by the Board of Deputies of British Jews and the Community Security Trust, which is that "an antisemitic incident is any malicious act aimed at Jewish people, organisations or property, where there is evidence that the incident has antisemitic motivation or content, or that the victim was targeted because they are (or are believed to be) Jewish." In a December letter to the BBC's director-general Tony Hall and director of news and current affairs Francesca Unsworth, JVL said: "In the closing stages of an acrimonious election campaign, the BBC's coverage of anti-semitism charges against the Labour Party has been both unbalanced and uncritical."

=== 2020 ===
In a January public letter to the candidates ahead of the 2020 Labour Party leadership election, JVL expressed concerns over the impact of the Board of Deputies of British Jews' 10-point pledge "to tackle the anti-semitism crisis" on Labour's independence and ability to show solidarity with Palestine. JVL expressed fears that the pledges would silence any criticism of Israel and reverse steps made under Jeremy Corbyn's leadership towards a progressive foreign policy. In February, the Board of Deputies of British Jews was accused of defending the occupation of Palestine after it condemned the United Nations for listing companies linked to illegal Israeli settlements. JVL also argued that the Board of Deputies of British Jews "will do anything it possibly can to divert attention from the reality of the occupation." In February, JVL accused Campaign Against Antisemitism of disproportionately targeting Labour over other political parties.

In April, JVL said in a joint statement with the Labour Representation Committee and Red Labour that Keir Starmer being elected Labour leader is "a worrying outcome" for those inspired by Corbyn's vision as there are indications that Starmer's intention is "to marginalise, if not drive out, the left". Two days later, JVL said it hopes Starmer would "extend the same courtesy to Jews like us: active party members who take a different political view". The following week, JVL released a joint statement with Red Labour and the Labour Representation Committee based on the message of a unified grassroots coalition called "Don't Leave, Organise". The initiative was supported by the Bakers, Food and Allied Workers' Union, former Labour MP Laura Pidcock, and retired Aslef president Tosh McDonald, among others. Their statement urged socialists to remain in the Labour Party in order to "contribute to the efforts to re-unite the left, and be part of a renewed focus for mobilising to demand the society we need for the many", and that "any genuine coalition of the left should include both traditional established organisations and emerging new groupings".

In May, JVL provided an analysis of more than 150 claims that the Jewish Labour Movement (JLM) included in a submission to the Equality and Human Rights Commission (EHRC) in December in response to EHRC's investigation into institutional antisemitism in the Labour Party. JVL said that the JLM's claims are based on "prejudiced gossip, distortion, double standards and presumed guilt without investigation", and that evidence sent by the JLM to the EHRC is "largely worthless" as it "misstates facts and draws false conclusions". The executive summary of the analysis stated that many of the claims are "simply rumour and gossip, or unsubstantiated allegations". JVL also pointed to the Labour Party's Governance and Legal Unit report leaked in April (The work of the Labour Party's Governance and Legal Unit in relation to antisemitism, 2014–2019), saying that its content "further undermines" allegations that Corbyn's team were negligent in efforts to handle allegations of antisemitism within the party and that "procedural failings [were] unjustifiably attributed to anti-semitic bias".

In July, JVL supported protests against further expansion of the Israeli occupation of the West Bank, including Israel's plans to illegally annexe land in the West Bank. In the same month, the Labour Party promised to pay around £500,000 in damages from subscription payments of party members to former senior staffers who claimed defamation following a BBC Panorama investigation into allegations of antisemitism within Labour. JVL said the Labour Party's decision to make the payments despite receiving legal advice that it would win the case was "deeply disappointing". In August, in response to David Evans, the general secretary of the Labour Party, ordering Labour branches and the Constituency Labour Party not to discuss investigations into antisemitism, a related libel settlement and the adoption of the International Holocaust Remembrance Alliance's working definition of antisemitism, JVL said "there is nothing illegitimate" in members seeking to debate the differing views that are widespread at all levels of the party, and called Evans "to withdraw this draconian attempt to silence the membership by forbidding legitimate and necessary debate on important matters of concern to us all".

=== 2025: Jewish Voice for Liberation ===
In late 2025, the organisation changed its name to Jewish Voice for Liberation. As of January 2026, the revised website describes the organisation as "a Jewish-led organisation for members of the labour, trade union, socialist and progressive movements. We are internationalist, anti-Zionist and anti-racist".

== See also ==
- Independent Jewish Voices
- Jewdas
