= Jewish Labour Movement =

Socialist society in the United Kingdom

- Abbreviation: JLM
- Formation: 1903
- Location: United Kingdom
- Members: 3,000 (2020)
- National movement chair: Ella Rose-Jacobs
- Parliamentary chair: vacant as of April 2026
- National secretary: Rebecca Filer
- National vice chairs: Miriam Mirwich and Izzy Lenga
- Affiliations: Labour Party (UK); Board of Deputies of British Jews; Zionist Federation of Great Britain and Ireland; World Zionist Organization; The Democrats (Israel)
- Website: jewishlabour.uk
- Formerly called: Poale Zion (PZ)

The Jewish Labour Movement (JLM), known as Poale Zion (Great Britain) from 1903 to 2004, is a Labour Zionist socialist society affiliated with the UK Labour Party. It was a member of the Avodah–Meretz–Arzenu–Ameinu grouping within the World Zionist Organization.

JLM is affiliated with the Board of Deputies of British Jews and the Zionist Federation of Great Britain and Ireland. The organisation's stated aims include maintaining and promoting Labour Zionism and supporting the development of political activists aligned with the Jewish Labour Movement's principles.

== Aims and membership ==
The organisation states that its aim is "to organise and maintain a political movement of Jewish people within the UK Labour Party and the international labour movement".

Full membership is open to Jews, while non-Jewish supporters may apply for ally membership. Only full members are eligible to vote in JLM decision-making processes and internal elections. Individuals who are members of political parties that oppose the Labour Party in elections are ineligible for membership.

The Jewish Labour Movement's stated values are based on a relationship between the Labour Party and Labour Zionism. These values are set out in the organisation's constitution and include support for international peace and cooperation; democratic socialism in the United Kingdom and Israel; the application of Jewish ethical principles to the pursuit of social justice and environmental sustainability; the promotion of the centrality of Israel in Jewish life; and opposition to fascist, racist, and antisemitic groups.

== Poale Zion ==
=== Establishment ===
Poale Zion in Britain originated in the Ma'aravi ("Western") Society, which was formed in London in 1902 by the Jewish journalist Kalman Marmor, influenced by the Eastern European Labour Zionist movement led by Ber Borochov. Branches of Poale Zion were established in London and Leeds in 1903–1904 and 1905 respectively, and in Manchester and Liverpool by 1906. Two branches operated in London, one affiliated with the garment workers' union and the other with the Independent Cabinet Makers Union. A permanent headquarters was opened in Whitechapel in February 1904, and a national organisation was formally established at a conference held in Manchester in 1906.

=== Early 20th century ===
Poale Zion was active in Britain during World War I under the leadership of J Pomeranz and Morris Meyer and was influential on the British labour movement. During this period, it contributed to discussions surrounding the Labour Party's War Aims Memorandum, drafted by Sidney Webb and Arthur Henderson, which expressed support for Jewish settlement in Palestine. This document preceded the Balfour Declaration by three months. At this time, Poale Zion published the periodical Jewish Labour Correspondence.

After the war, Poale Zion produced several pamphlets in Yiddish and published a Yiddish-language journal, Undzer Veg. Shlomo Kaplansky collaborated with the Independent Labour Party in the establishment of the International Working Union of Socialist Parties.

In mid-1920, the World Union of Poale Zion, based in Vienna, established a London office led by Kaplansky and David Ben-Gurion. The office was located in Petticoat Lane, where Moshe Sharett worked part-time translating material from Yiddish into English. The organisation developed contacts with both the Labour Party and the Independent Labour Party and achieved affiliation with the British Labour Party in 1920 under the name the Jewish Socialist Labour Party. It reported a membership of approximately 3,000, though actual membership was several hundred. Among the policy issues it sought to influence was the determination of the northern border of Mandatory Palestine at the San Remo conference, advocating for an extension to the Litani River. Its influence on the Labour Party's Middle East policy was limited, and the London office closed in March 1921.

Ramsay MacDonald was among Labour figures associated with Poale Zion, and the organisation published his pamphlet A Socialist in Palestine (1922), which documented his visit to the region. In 1923, Leah L'Estrange Malone became the organisation's first female chair. By 1928, the World Union of Poale Zion reported approximately 1,000 members in the United Kingdom. That year, World Poale Zion leader Dov Hoz was based in the UK and undertook efforts to revive and reorganise Poale Zion (Great Britain), including encouraging members to engage more actively within the Labour Party.

Young Poale Zion was established in Bethnal Green, London, in 1928 by Sam Dreen.

Poale Zion and Dov Hoz were involved in the 1930 Whitechapel and St George's by-election, during which Jewish voters supported the non-Jewish Labour candidate James Henry Hall over the Jewish Liberal candidate Barnett Janner.

During the 1940s, Poale Zion (Great Britain) reported a membership of nearly 2,000.

=== Late 20th century ===
In 1957, Poale Zion was involved in the establishment of Labour Friends of Israel, with which it has continued to cooperate.

Prior to the Six-Day War in 1967, Poale Zion represented a prevailing Zionist perspective within the British Labour Party. As anti-Zionist positions became more prominent on the party's left, relations with that section of the party became increasingly strained. In April 1983, women members of Poale Zion were prevented from attending an International Women's Day seminar at the Greater London Council's County Hall, and in 1984 a proposal was made to end the organisation's association with the Labour Party.

In June 1982, Poale Zion established a Scottish branch, with Maurice Miller, Member of Parliament for East Kilbride, serving as its chair. During the mid-1980s, the organisation reported a paper membership of 2,000. In 1985, Eric Heffer cited Poale Zion as a possible model for a Black socialist society within the Labour Party, in the context of discussions surrounding the Labour Party Black Sections. In the 1990s, Poale Zion affiliated with the Anti-Racist Alliance, and later with its successor organisation, the National Assembly Against Racism.

Notable postwar members of Poale Zion included Maurice Orbach; Samuel Fisher, Baron Fisher of Camden; Leo Abse, who established the Cardiff branch in 1948; Mary Mikardo and Ian Mikardo; Simon Pinner and his son Hayim Pinner, who served as president of the youth wing and as editor of its newspaper Jewish Vanguard during the 1960s; Leslie and Harold Lever, with Leslie Lever serving as chair; Percy Sassoon Gourgey, who served as secretary in 1959 and as chair from 1964 to 1967; Sidney Goldberg, general secretary at the time of the Six-Day War; and Eric Moonman, who served as chair during the 1970s. Reg Freeson served as political secretary, co-chair, and editor of the journal Vanguard from the late 1980s to the early 1990s. During the 1990s, Lawrie Nerva served as chair. In 2002, Louise Ellman held the position of vice-chair.

== Jewish Labour Movement ==
=== 2004–2015 ===
Poale Zion (Great Britain) was relaunched as the Jewish Labour Movement (JLM) in 2004. According to an account by Louise Ellman, the relaunch event took place in July 2004 at the House of Commons, and included participation by the Israeli ambassador and the Foreign Office minister responsible for Middle East affairs, as well as messages of support from the Prime Minister, the Board of Deputies of British Jews, and the World Labour Zionist Movement.

Ellman became chair of the Jewish Labour Movement in 2006, having previously served as vice-chair, and held the position until 2016. Representatives of JLM participated as speakers in the official commemorations of the Battle of Cable Street on its 75th and 80th anniversaries in 2011 and 2016. During the 2015 Labour Party leadership election, the Jewish Labour Movement nominated Yvette Cooper.

=== The 2016 restructure ===
After serving ten years as chair, Louise Ellman stepped down and became Honorary President. She was succeeded by Jeremy Newmark, a former chief executive of the Jewish Leadership Council and a former spokesperson for the Chief Rabbi, Jonathan Sacks. Newmark had also stood as the Labour Party parliamentary candidate for Finchley and Golders Green in the 2017 general election. Sarah Sackman and Mike Katz were elected as vice-chairs.

Peter Mason was appointed national secretary. He was subsequently elected to the Labour Party's National Constitutional Committee, which is responsible for handling disciplinary cases, becoming the first candidate associated with the Jewish Labour Movement to be elected to a national Labour committee in 20 years. This followed recommendations made in the Chakrabarti Inquiry, which proposed transferring additional powers to the committee.

Commenting on the organisation's position within the Labour Party, The Jewish Chronicle noted that JLM's affiliation as a socialist society provided it with access to internal party structures. The newspaper reported that Newmark stated that Jewish members should remain engaged within the Labour Party rather than leave it, in order to maintain representation and influence. Newmark stated that the purpose of the Jewish Labour Movement was to serve as an organising focus within the party for members who regarded Labour as their political home.

In March 2016, David Hirsh wrote that the Jewish Labour Movement was emerging as an organising focus within the Labour Party. The Jewish Chronicle described JLM as a meeting point for moderate Labour members opposed to the party's direction under Jeremy Corbyn. During this period, affiliate membership was introduced for non-Jewish supporters, and overall membership increased to approximately 1,000.

At its 2016 annual general meeting, the Jewish Labour Movement voted unanimously to adopt a revised organisational structure intended to expand its engagement with the Labour Party at local, regional, and national levels. In the 2016 Labour Party leadership election, JLM nominated Owen Smith, after more than 90 per cent of participating members supported him in an internal ballot. Some commentators interpreted this position as reflecting opposition to Jeremy Corbyn’s leadership and to pro-Palestinian members of the party.

During this period, several younger members were appointed to organisational roles, including Rachel Wenstone as networks officer, Jay Stoll as political education officer, Adam Langleben as campaigns officer, and Liron Velleman as youth and student officer. In July 2016, Ella Rose was appointed as the organisation's first director. Rose had previously served as president of the Union of Jewish Students and as a public affairs officer at the Israeli Embassy, and had held advisory roles with the Jewish Leadership Council and the Board of Deputies of British Jews.

In September 2017, the Jewish Labour Movement held its first one-day conference. By February 2018, the organisation reported a membership of more than 2,000, according to its national secretary, Peter Mason.

=== Leadership and organisation ===
In February 2018, Jeremy Newmark resigned as chair of the Jewish Labour Movement following the publication by The Jewish Chronicle of an internal audit report concerning his conduct during his tenure as chief executive of the Jewish Leadership Council. The report alleged that between 2006 and 2013 he had improperly claimed more than £10,000 in expenses. The newspaper reported that the council had accepted his resignation at the time on the grounds of ill health. Newmark denied any wrongdoing and resigned as chair of the Jewish Labour Movement two days after the report's publication. Later that month, the Jewish Labour Movement stated that it had referred certain financial matters to the police for investigation.

Newmark was succeeded as chair by Ivor Caplin. In October 2018, the organisation's director, Ella Rose, left her position to take up a role with the Holocaust Educational Trust. In April 2019, Mike Katz was elected national movement chair, defeating Ivor Caplin, and Ruth Smeeth was elected parliamentary chair, succeeding Luciana Berger, who had resigned from the Labour Party in February 2019. Joe Goldberg, Sarah Sackman, and Ulrich Stéphane Savary were elected as national vice-chairs.

The Jewish Labour Movement operates a Local Government Network, which aims to appoint representatives within Labour groups across the United Kingdom to act as points of contact, support local engagement, and liaise with the organisation nationally. Its Jewish Councillors Network provides support and coordination for Jewish Labour councillors serving as elected representatives and campaigners. The Youth and Students section offers members aged 14 to 26 opportunities to participate in organisational activities and engage with the Labour Party.

=== Relationship with the party ===
At the Labour Party Conference in September 2017, proposals submitted by the Jewish Labour Movement were adopted, introducing new rules that classified hate speech as a disciplinary offence within the party. In March 2018, the Jewish Labour Movement supported a demonstration organised by Jewish groups concerning the Labour Party leadership's handling of allegations of antisemitism.

In April 2018, the Jewish Labour Movement sought and received confirmation that it would remain the Labour Party's sole affiliated Jewish organisation, following discussions about the potential affiliation of Jewish Voice for Labour. In September 2018, the Labour Party incorporated all 11 examples from the IHRA definition of antisemitism, without amendment, into its code of conduct, in line with requests made by the Jewish Labour Movement. In October 2018, the organisation invited Labour Party members to submit examples of antisemitism within the party.

In November 2018, the Jewish Labour Movement submitted a dossier of reported incidents to the Equality and Human Rights Commission (EHRC) and requested an investigation into the Labour Party, which it characterised as exhibiting institutional antisemitism. In March 2019, Jeremy Corbyn wrote to the Jewish Labour Movement expressing a desire for the organisation to remain affiliated with the party, following reports that it was considering disaffiliation.

In April 2019, Gordon Brown and Sadiq Khan announced that they had joined the Jewish Labour Movement. Brown stated that his decision was intended to support Jewish members in the context of allegations of antisemitism within the Labour Party, while Khan said that he joined to express support for British Jews. During the same month, the Jewish Labour Movement voted to remain affiliated with the Labour Party, but passed a motion of no confidence in Jeremy Corbyn, citing concerns about his handling of allegations of antisemitism.

In July 2019, the Jewish Labour Movement described the Labour Party's appointment of a liaison officer to improve relations with the Jewish community as ineffective. In September 2019, the organisation held a rally at Middle Street Synagogue in Brighton during the Labour Party Conference. Speakers included Members of Parliament, a Member of the European Parliament, the Mayor of London, and representatives from affiliated and related Labour organisations.

In December 2019, the Jewish Labour Movement made a submission to the Equality and Human Rights Commission as part of its investigation into allegations of antisemitism in the Labour Party, providing anecdotal examples of reported incidents. In 2020, the Jewish Labour Movement nominated Lisa Nandy in the Labour Party leadership election and Ian Murray in the deputy leadership election, in both cases by narrow margins in internal ballots.

=== Training ===
Following its restructuring in 2016, the Jewish Labour Movement began offering antisemitism awareness training to Constituency Labour Parties. In 2018, the organisation declined to provide such training to individuals who were subject to disciplinary proceedings, stating that it did not consider training to be an appropriate disciplinary sanction. In August 2018, the Jewish Labour Movement withdrew from providing training at the Labour Party's annual conference following disagreements with the party leadership regarding the proposed content.

In March 2019, the Jewish Labour Movement suspended its antisemitism training programme. The organisation stated that its role had been undermined after the Labour Party announced plans to enrol staff and members of the National Executive Committee and National Constitutional Committee on an antisemitism course developed by the Pears Institute for the Study of Antisemitism, despite previously indicating that Jewish communal organisations would be consulted.

In July 2019, the Jewish Labour Movement suspended a member who continued to provide antisemitism training independently. During the same month, it declined to collaborate with the Labour Party on the development of educational materials relating to antisemitism. In June 2020, the organisation stated that it would not provide antisemitism training for all Labour Party staff, as requested by party leader Keir Starmer, citing concerns that staff allegedly involved in earlier failures to address antisemitism remained in their roles.

In 2021, the Labour Party's National Executive Committee announced that all prospective Labour candidates would receive antisemitism training delivered by the Jewish Labour Movement. At the same meeting, the Jewish Labour Movement welcomed the National Executive Committee's decision to ban the organisations Resist, Labour Against the Witchhunt, the Labour in Exile Network, and Socialist Appeal.

=== Campaigning ===
In April 2019, Mike Katz stated that the Jewish Labour Movement would adopt a selective approach to campaigning for Labour candidates in future elections, indicating that support would be contingent on candidates' positions regarding the party leadership's handling of antisemitism allegations.

The Jewish Labour Movement stated that its members would not campaign for Labour candidate Lisa Forbes in the 2019 Peterborough by-election, following reports that Forbes had interacted on social media with content that included references to a "Zionist" agenda and claims concerning the origins of Islamic State. Forbes said that she had liked the video and a broader discussion thread without noticing the specific comments cited.

In October 2019, The Jewish Chronicle reported that members of the Jewish Labour Movement would not campaign for Labour candidate Ross Houston in the Finchley and Golders Green constituency during the 2019 general election, citing solidarity with the organisation's former parliamentary chair, Luciana Berger, who was standing for the Liberal Democrats in that seat. Later the same day, it was reported that the Jewish Labour Movement had stated that it would generally refrain from campaigning, except in exceptional circumstances or for candidates who had demonstrated consistent support for the organisation, and that it would not issue endorsements for candidates in constituencies not previously held by Labour.

== Criticism ==
The Jewish Labour Movement has been the subject of criticism from some individuals and groups within the Labour Party. Critics have argued that the organisation was largely inactive by the early 21st century, and that its revival was linked to opposition to the leadership of Jeremy Corbyn. Such claims were referenced following the broadcast in early 2017 of The Lobby, an undercover documentary produced by Al Jazeera, which examined the activities of pro-Israel advocacy groups in British politics. Some critics interpreted the programme as suggesting that the Jewish Labour Movement operated in coordination with the Israeli embassy, and sought to reduce support for Corbyn's leadership.

At the Labour Party Conference in September 2017, Michael Kalmanovitz of the International Jewish Anti-Zionist Network stated at a fringe meeting hosted by the group Free Speech on Israel that the Jewish Labour Movement and Labour Friends of Israel should be removed from the Labour Party. During the same conference, a number of Jewish Labour members launched Jewish Voice for Labour, describing it as an alternative organisation for Jewish members who did not support the Jewish Labour Movement's Zionist orientation. Supporters of Jewish Voice for Labour argued that the Jewish Labour Movement could not represent all Jewish Labour members because of its commitment to promoting the centrality of Israel in Jewish life and its alignment with the Jerusalem Programme of the World Zionist Organization.

In March 2018, the Morning Star published criticism of the Jewish Labour Movement, characterising it as holding what it described as an uncritical Zionist position and alleging that internal disagreements reflected broader divisions between Zionist and anti-Zionist perspectives within the Jewish community. In April 2018, following the Jewish Labour Movement's vote of no confidence in Jeremy Corbyn, the political secretary of the Labour Representation Committee stated that the organisation's actions were undermining the prospects of a Labour government and called for its disaffiliation from the Labour Party.

== See also ==
- Habonim Dror
- Independent Jewish Voices
- Israel lobby in the United Kingdom
- The Lobby (TV series)
- Jewdas
- Jewish Socialists' Group
- Jewish Voice for Liberation
