= The Lobby (TV series) =

Series of documentaries produced by Al Jazeera

- Created by: Al Jazeera Investigates
- Narrated by: Clayton Swisher
- Original language: English
- No. of series: 2
- No. of episodes: 8

Production
- Production locations: United Kingdom and United States
- Running time: 25 minutes (UK); 50 minutes (US)
- Production company: Al Jazeera Media Network

Original release
- Network: Al Jazeera English
- Release: 2017

The Lobby is a series of documentaries produced by Al Jazeera that investigate the influence of the Israel lobby in the United Kingdom and in the United States.

== First series (The Lobby) ==
In the UK, the National Union of Students, Jewish Labour Movement, Union of Jewish Students, Conservative Friends of Israel, Labour Friends of Israel and other UK based pro-Israel groups were profiled. Additionally, the series explores claims of antisemitism in the Labour Party and also the role of MP Joan Ryan.

=== Production ===
Using undercover techniques, the film relied primarily on fly on the wall footage using a surreptitious bodycam and other cameras whose presence were not known to those being filmed. The film took six months to make and was broadcast on Al Jazeera in January 2017.

==== Themes ====
- The targeting of pro-Palestinian politicians: a conversation between Shai Masot, an official at the Israeli embassy in London, and a British civil servant was recorded. In the recording, Masot discussed his desire to "take down" British politicians, including Alan Duncan, then Minister of State for Europe and the Americas, who was a critic of Israeli settlements. The British civil servant said Crispin Blunt, whom Masot described as "strongly pro-Arab rather than pro-Israel", was on a "hitlist".
- Supporting lobbying groups: Masot was also recorded setting up a pro-Israel youth organisation, which he intended to link to the existing Labour Friends of Israel. He was also recorded telling Joan Ryan, Chair of Labour Friends of Israel, that he had £1 million to fund trips to Israel for Labour Friends of Israel MPs.
- Allegations of antisemitism: Joan Ryan was shown arguing with Labour Party member and pro-Palestine activist Jean Fitzpatrick about a two-state solution between Israel and the Palestine at the 2016 Labour Party Conference. Ryan lodged a formal complaint of antisemitic behaviour as a result of this conversation. Her account of the incident was disputed and her complaint was later dismissed. Fitzpatrick told al Jazeera that "If you do talk about Palestine, it would appear you're kind of sucked into having an accusation of anti-Semitism brought against you". The film also included an interview with Jackie Walker, who was accused of antisemitism in relation to remarks she made at the conference. Walker told al Jazeera that "I would say there is a crisis in the way the anti-Semitism is being manipulated and being used by certain parts – not just in the Labour Party but other parties and the media to discredit Jeremy Corbyn and a number of his supporters".

=== Consequences and responses ===
The Israeli ambassador, Mark Regev, apologised to Alan Duncan for the comments made by Masot. Masot was sent back to Israel and resigned, as did the civil servant involved.

Labour's then Shadow Foreign Secretary, Emily Thornberry, called on the Commons foreign affairs committee to conduct an inquiry into what appeared to be improper interference in British politics by a foreign power. The Leader of the Opposition, Jeremy Corbyn, wrote to the Prime Minister along the same lines. Alex Salmond, the Scottish National Party's foreign affairs spokesman, asked for a full investigation, while Crispin Blunt questioned whether Israel's interests were best served by such methods. However, Boris Johnson, then Foreign Secretary, rejected calls to take action against the Israeli embassy and said that he regarded the matter as closed.

The National Union of Students said it was investigating alleged attempts to influence its 2016 leadership election, which saw its first black, Muslim, female president Malia Bouattia voted in. Following claims that NUS members opposed to Bouattia held "secret meetings" with activists supported by the Israeli embassy, a spokesperson for the union said the organisation was looking into the allegations.

The Labour Party declined to investigate complaints arising from the programme against Joan Ryan and the Jewish Labour Movement director.

In October 2017, Ofcom rejected complaints that the series was antisemitic or had breached impartiality rules.

== Second series (The Lobby – USA) ==
A US version of the film, on the Israel lobby in the United States, was made, in which an Al Jazeera reporter named James Anthony Kleinfeld had infiltrated several pro-Israel advocacy organizations in Washington, D.C. including Stand With Us, Brandeis Center, The Israel Project, the Foundation for Defense of Democracies, the Israel on Campus Coalition, the Zionist Organization of America's (ZOA) Fuel For Truth, and the Canary Mission.

On October 11, 2017, Al Jazeera announced that it had installed an undercover journalist inside several Washington–based pro-Israel organisations in 2016 and that it was planning to air a documentary film based on the reporter's work. Clayton Swisher, Al Jazeera's director of investigative reporting, also acknowledged that the network had stationed an undercover journalist in both the UK and US at the same time.

On February 8, 2018, it was reported that Qatari leaders had reassured the leaders of Jewish American organisations that Al Jazeera would not be airing the US companion series. According to Haaretz, the Qatari government had reportedly hired Republican Senator Ted Cruz's former aide Nicolas Muzin to open communications channels with Jewish American organisations. Earlier, the network had sent letters to several American pro-Israel organisations informing them that their employees would appear in the documentary. These letters generated speculation that the Qatari government had reneged on its earlier promise to block Al Jazeera from screening the controversial documentary which, like the earlier British series, had utilized clandestine footage and recordings of pro-Israel activists.

Al Jazeera's decision not to screen the documentary drew criticism from Clayton Swisher, who accused the network of capitulation to outside pressure. Swisher said that the practice of using undercover investigators "is used by many international broadcasters, including BBC and CNN, and is carefully managed, through multiple layers of legal and editorial review, to ensure it is performed consistently with local laws, industry regulations, and our own Code of Ethics". Swisher took a sabbatical from Al Jazeera due to the network's failure to respond to attacks on the project and the lack of transparency around the network's decision to delay the broadcast. In March 2018, a bipartisan group of US lawmakers including Democratic Congressman Josh Gottheimer, Republican Congressman Lee Zeldin, and Ted Cruz penned a letter urging United States Attorney General Jeff Sessions to investigate whether Al Jazeera should register as a foreign agent under the Foreign Agents Registration Act. They also urged the Justice Department to investigate reports that the network had infiltrated non-profit organisations and accused Al Jazeera of broadcasting antisemitic, anti-Israel, and anti-American content. On April 10, 2018, the Zionist Organization of America's president Morton Klein claimed credit for lobbying the Qatari government not to screen Al Jazeera's companion documentary series focusing on American pro-Israel lobby.

In late August and early September 2018, leaked portions of the documentary series were aired by several outlets including The Electronic Intifada. In a leaked clip shown by Electronic Intifada in August 2018, the film claimed that Israeli-American real estate investor Adam Milstein, a major donor to pro-Israel campus groups, funds Canary Mission, an anonymous website that records and shames people it believes "promote hatred of the USA, Israel and Jews on North American college campuses". Critics have accused Canary Mission of intimidating pro-Palestinian activists and threatening them with blacklisting. The evidence for the claim is an exchange between Al Jazeera's undercover reporter "Tony", who is posing as an intern, and Eric Gallagher, an employee at The Israel Project:

Gallagher tells "Tony" that Milstein spoke with him on the phone about starting a "name-and-shame" effort, and solicited his feedback.

"So, Adam Milstein funds The Israel Project and he's funding the Canary Mission website?" Tony asks.

"Yeah, which is interesting because it makes us seem as though we're a part of it, but we're not," Gallagher responds, referring to The Israel Project.

In a statement to JTA, a spokesperson for Milstein denied that he funded Canary Mission. The spokesperson also provided an email from Gallagher where he denied having referred to Milstein.

In early November, The Electronic Intifada released the four episodes of The Lobby—USA simultaneously with the French media outlet Orient XXI and the Lebanese newspaper Al Akhbar. Al Jazeera issued a statement condemning its release.

== Reception ==
Stephen Pollard in the Jewish Chronicle dismissed the film as "the stupid bragging of two junior aides with close to zero influence". The Electronic Intifada editor Asa Winstanley wrote in Middle East Monitor that the film is a "superb undercover investigation."

Ben Norton of The Real News interviewed Max Blumenthal and The Electronic Intifada executive director Ali Abunimah about clips leaked from the unscreened US film; Abunimah called it an "important film".

In 2018 it won the CINE Golden Eagle Award for the best non-fiction mini-series.

== See also ==
- All the Prime Minister's Men
- Boycott, Divestment and Sanctions
- The Israel Lobby and U.S. Foreign Policy
