= Antisemitism in the British Labour Party =

Allegations and incidents of antisemitism within the British Labour Party have involved members and affiliates of the party. These incidents have spanned various periods and have involved stereotypes, conspiracy theories, and offensive language. Labour has faced criticism for its handling of such incidents, including its disciplinary measures and the prevalence of certain antisemitic tropes within the party. There has also been debate over current definitions of antisemitism, including whether criticism of the State of Israel constitutes a new antisemitism. The Labour Party has publicly condemned antisemitism and taken steps to address concerns, but the issue remains a subject of ongoing debate and controversy.

Following Jeremy Corbyn's election as party leader in 2015, allegations of antisemitism within the party grew. In response, Corbyn established the Chakrabarti Inquiry, which said that the party was not "overrun by anti-Semitism or other forms of racism" but that there was evidence of ignorance and sometimes toxicity within the party. The inquiry made 20 recommendations. In 2017, Labour Party rules were amended to categorise hate speech, including antisemitism, as a disciplinary matter. A commissioned YouGov poll in 2017 found that Labour supporters were less likely to hold antisemitic views than Conservative Party or UK Independence Party supporters. A study by the Institute for Jewish Policy Research that same year reported that those on the left-wing of the political spectrum were no more antisemitic than the general population and less antisemitic than those who were right-wing, and also stated those of the left-wing were more likely to be critical of the State of Israel. In July 2018, the governing body of the Labour Party adopted the International Holocaust Remembrance Alliance's working definition of antisemitism for disciplinary purposes, with modified examples related to criticism of Israel.

In May 2019, the Equality and Human Rights Commission (EHRC) launched an inquiry into whether Labour had "unlawfully discriminated against, harassed or victimised people" because they were Jewish. In April 2020, the new party leader Keir Starmer announced that an internal report on Labour's handling of antisemitism claims would not be submitted to the EHRC as evidence. Following this, the internal report was leaked. The report said Corbyn's team had inherited a lack of processes and systems for handling antisemitism, and that hostility towards Corbyn's team by senior officials from Labour's right-wing had contributed to mistakes, confusion and difficulties handling cases. Later that month, the Labour Party's governing body commissioned the barrister Martin Forde to lead a new independent review. In October 2020, the EHRC published its report, finding 23 instances of political interference and concluding that Labour had breached the Equality Act in two cases. In 2022, the Forde Report was published and said the issue of antisemitism was being used as a factional weapon. The report also said that senior figures in Labour hostile to Corbyn and his supporters had slowed down the leadership in dealing with antisemitism and other forms of racism.

== 20th century ==
=== Second Boer War and "Jewish finance" ===
In the late 19th century, antisemitism was common throughout British society. This intensified during the Second Boer War (1899–1902) and came to include the labour movement, dismaying socialist Jews. Liberal MP John Burns' was prone to antisemitic outbursts when airing his views on the war, and labour movement figures opposed to the war, such as Henry Hyndman, blamed "Jewish capitalists" for starting it, which angered other members of the Social Democratic Federation. Liberal journalist J. A. Hobson wrote that the gold mines in South Africa were "almost entirely in their [the Jews'] hands", and Labour Party founder Keir Hardie stated that Jewish financial houses were part of a secretive imperialist cabal that promoted war. According to Denis Judd and Keith Surridge in The Boer War: A History, the Independent Labour Party, the Trades Union Congress, and Robert Blatchford's The Clarion blamed "Jewish capitalists" for being "behind the war and imperialism in general".

=== Palestine ===
Antisemitic attitudes were not prominent in the 1980s Labour Party. Paul Kelemen ascribed the shift in Labour's views to Israel's increasingly right-leaning politics and to the left's opposition to the Israeli occupation of the West Bank and Gaza. He found no evidence that antisemitism played a role in the left's changing perceptions of the Israeli–Palestinian conflict in that period. Daniel L. Staetsky, stated that in the 1980s, parts of the political left assumed pro-Palestinian and anti-Israel positions, and faced accusations of antisemitism within Labour.

== 2000–2015 ==
=== "Israel lobby" accusations ===
In 2003, Labour MP Tam Dalyell claimed, referring to the Israel lobby in the United States, that "there is far too much Jewish influence in the United States" and that "a cabal of Jewish advisers" was directing American and British policy on Iraq, stating that six of seven hawkish advisers to President George Bush were Jewish, close to Ariel Sharon's Likud, and also singling out Michael Levy, chief fundraiser for Tony Blair and his Middle East envoy for nine years. Eric Moonman stated he did not think that Dalyell, a close associate of Richard Crossman, was antisemitic, but that his language could be taken as supportive of such views. (Note: "Mr Dalyell's career includes a close alliance with the late Richard Crossman, a passionate Zionist who believed that all gentiles – including himself – are anti-semitic at some level.")

In 2010, Labour MP Martin Linton alleged that a malevolent Israel lobby operated in the UK, saying "There are long tentacles of Israel in this country who are funding election campaigns and putting money into the British political system for their own ends", while his Jewish fellow Labour MP Gerald Kaufman said that right-wing Jewish millionaires had large stakes in the Conservative Party. (Note: The British Liberal Party's Baroness Tonge had, some years earlier (2006), asserted that 'The pro-Israeli lobby has got its grips on the Western world, its financial grips. I think they've probably got a grip on our party'. Likewise, Conservative MP Sir Alan Duncan in 2014 stated that despite UK rules forbidding political funding from abroad, in his view an exception was made for Israel, and later added that "the United States is in hock to a very powerful financial lobby which dominates its politics.") Community Security Trust spokesman Mark Gardner responded: "Anybody who understands antisemitism will recognise just how ugly and objectionable these quotes are, with their imagery of Jewish control and money power." In 2015, Kaufman said that "Jewish money, Jewish donations ... [and] support from the Jewish Chronicle" had led to "a big group of Conservative MPs who are pro-Israel whatever (its) government does", referring to the Conservative Friends of Israel; Corbyn condemned Kaufman's remarks at the time as "completely unacceptable".

=== 2005 ===
In 2005, Labour politician Ken Livingstone was accused of antisemitism after he asked Evening Standard reporter Oliver Finegold if he had been "a German war criminal". When the reporter said he was Jewish, Livingstone said "Just like a concentration camp guard, you are just doing it because you are paid to, aren't you?" and asserted that he (Finegold) worked for the "reactionary bigots... who supported fascism" at the Daily Mail. The Evening Standard was then a sister paper of the Mail, which had been supportive of fascism in the 1930s.

==== Election ====
In the run-up to the 2005 United Kingdom general election, Labour, under Tony Blair, tested posters which TBWA, Labour's advertising agency, later said originated from Campaign Director Alastair Campbell. One depicted the faces of Conservative Party leader Michael Howard (Note: When Howard made an unsuccessful bid in 1997 to become Prime Minister, it was alleged he was the victim of a widespread antisemitic whispering campaign by Conservative backbenchers and members of the constituency workers. In his 2004 comeback he argued for a programme blatantly hostile to immigrants while rebuffing accusations he was racist as impossible, since he himself was the son and grandson of Holocaust survivors.) and Shadow Chancellor Oliver Letwin, who are Jewish, superimposed upon flying pigs. The slogan was "The Day Tory Sums Add Up" and the poster illustrated the adynaton, when pigs fly, used for something that never happens. (Note: Kushner argues: 'A closer reading of these images, however, reveals a more nuanced situation. In the case of the two little Jewish pigs, the direct connection to the Judensau is coincidental: if anything, the images managed to make Howard and Letwin endearing. Yet if the point that the Conservative figures on tax and spending simply did not add up-hence pigs might fly-it was insensitive of the Labour spin doctors not to show some awareness that to connect Jews to pork, the subject of past Christian fascination, crude humour and physical persecution, lacked an element of sensitivity.') A second poster was of Howard swinging a pocket watch on its chain with the slogan "I can spend the same money twice!" somewhat suggestive of stage hypnosis, where the subject is persuaded to accept false suggestions as true. In 1997, Conservative backbencher Ann Widdecombe had suggested Howard, whose father was born in Romania, had an image problem in that he had "something of the night about him". Labour strategists leapt at this by then depicting Howard as a Dracula figure swinging a hypnotic watch. The pose was said by The Jewish Chronicle to be reminiscent of fictional Jewish, criminal, characters, such as the moneylender, Shylock, from The Merchant of Venice and the master pickpocket, Fagin, from Oliver Twist. The posters were not used and Labour denied any antisemitic intent. They prompted protests from some Jewish groups but the Board of Deputies of British Jews (BDBJ) declined to raise the issue.

=== Corbyn's backbench record ===
Jeremy Corbyn was a patron of the Palestinian Solidarity Campaign, and had campaigned extensively for Palestinian rights during his 32 years as a Parliament backbencher.

In August 2015, as Corbyn emerged as a front-runner in Labour's leadership election, The Jewish Chronicle devoted its front page to seven questions regarding Corbyn's associations with those it described as "Holocaust deniers, terrorists and some outright antisemites", although Corbyn said he met with them in his search for Middle East peace. These included his relationship with Islamist militant organisations Hezbollah and Hamas, organisations that Corbyn called "friends" (although he has stated he disagrees with their views); and his failure to object to what The Jewish Chronicle described as antisemitic banners and posters at London Quds Day rallies supported by the organisation, Stop the War Coalition, of which Corbyn was national chair from 2011 to 2015. Two of the questions related to "Deir Yassin Remembered", an organisation commemorating the massacre of over 100 Palestinian villagers in 1948 and founded by Holocaust denier Paul Eisen. Up to 2013, Corbyn and Gerald Kaufman, a Jewish Labour MP, attended "two or three" of the group's annual events. Corbyn has said that this had taken place before Eisen had made his views known publicly, and that he would not have associated with him had he known. It was reported that Eisen's views were known in 2005 and that he had written an essay on his website in 2008 entitled "My life as a Holocaust denier".

== 2016 ==
=== Shah, Livingstone and Walker comments ===
In April 2016, after it was revealed that Labour MP Naz Shah had, during the 2014 Israel–Gaza conflict and before becoming an MP, shared a graphic of Israel superimposed on the U.S. with the caption "Solution for Israel-Palestine conflict – relocate Israel into United States", adding the comment, "Problem solved". She was suspended pending investigation, but reinstated after agreeing to apologise for bringing the party into disrepute. By May 2016, Labour had suspended 56 members for statements alleged to be antisemitic, pending investigation; these accounted for 0.4% of the parliamentary group, 0.07% of Labour councillors, and 0.012% of the Party membership. The graphic was created by American political scientist Norman Finkelstein, who described the controversy as "obscene". Referring to those on the Labour right allegedly using the scandal to undermine Corbyn, Finkelstein asked "What are they doing? Don't they have any respect for the dead? ... All these desiccated Labour apparatchiks, dragging the Nazi holocaust through the mud for the sake of their petty jostling for power and position. Have they no shame?"

Livingstone defended Shah and said he had never heard antisemitic comments from Labour members. Livingstone added: "When Hitler won his election in 1932 his policy then was that Jews should be moved to Israel. He was supporting Zionism before he went mad and ended up killing six million Jews." After a year-long suspension, a hearing in April 2017 by the National Constitution Committee (NCC) determined he was guilty of prejudicial and detrimental conduct and suspended him from standing for office or representing the party for a further year. In May 2018, he resigned from the party, saying the issues surrounding his suspension had become a distraction. In a statement Livingstone said, "I do not accept the allegation that I have brought Labour into disrepute – nor that I am in any way guilty of antisemitism. I abhor antisemitism, I have fought it all my life and will continue to do so."

In May 2016, Momentum vice-chair Jackie Walker was investigated by the party over private comments she made on Facebook exaggerating the role of Jews in the Atlantic slave trade. Walker said her words had been taken out of context. No further action was taken following the investigation. Momentum chair Jon Lansman defended her, describing the media as "a 'lynch mob' whose interest in combating racism is highly selective". Following that year's Party Conference, at which Walker asked in a training session why Holocaust Memorial Day did not include pre-1940 genocides such as the Atlantic slave trade, she was removed from her Momentum position, while remaining on its steering committee, after TSSA union general secretary Manuel Cortes said their funding would be reconsidered otherwise. Lansman called Walker's comments "ill-informed, ill-judged and offensive", but not antisemitic. The party suspended her pending investigation. Walker said that she "utterly condemn[s] antisemitism", that her words were taken out of context, and that "I would never play down the significance of the Shoah. Working with many Jewish comrades, I continue to seek to bring greater awareness of other genocides, which are too often forgotten or minimised. If offence has been caused, it is the last thing I would want to do and I apologise." She was expelled from the party for misconduct in March 2019.

=== Inquiries ===
Following the suspensions, Corbyn commissioned an inquiry into antisemitism and other forms of racism in April 2016, led by barrister Shami Chakrabarti, former head of the human rights advocacy group Liberty. She said she joined Labour to show that she had members' interests and values at heart. The inquiry had two deputy chairs: Jan Royall and David Feldman, Director of the Pears Institute for the Study of Antisemitism. In 2007, Feldman was a signatory to Independent Jewish Voices, which in May 2016 described some allegations of antisemitism within Labour as "baseless and disingenuous". Chakrabarti said he distanced himself from this comment.

In June, the inquiry reported that it had found "no evidence" of systemic antisemitism in Labour, save for an "occasionally toxic atmosphere", and made 20 recommendations, including outlawing offensive terms and improving disciplinary procedures. Responses included both acceptance and criticism. Jewish Labour Movement (JLM) chair Jeremy Newmark said, "It's a strong platform for the party to ... set a gold standard in tackling racism and anti-Semitism." BDBJ said: "We hope that the implementation of this report will be rigorous and swift." Chief Rabbi Ephraim Mirvis called for a "full and unhesitating implementation of the report's findings".

Chakrabarti was Labour's sole nomination to the House of Lords in David Cameron's August 2016 Resignation Honours. She became a peer in September and the following month was appointed Shadow Attorney General. Commentators were immediately more critical, with the report being described as a "whitewash for peerage scandal" by BDBJ. British author Howard Jacobson called the inquiry "a brief and shoddy shuffling of superficies", and suggested that the peerage was showing contempt for those who had objected.

In April 2018, Chakrabarti accepted that some recommendations had not been implemented and said that Labour Party General Secretary Jennie Formby would make this a priority.

Following allegations of antisemitism within the Oxford University Labour Club, Jan Royall chaired an inquiry by Labour Students. The party's NEC accepted the report in May 2016. The report found "no evidence the club is itself institutionally anti-Semitic", still reporting a "cultural problem" in which (antisemitic) "behaviour and language that would once have been intolerable is now tolerated".

In October, the House of Commons Home Affairs Select Committee held an inquiry into antisemitism in the United Kingdom. The committee found "no reliable, empirical evidence to support the notion that there is a higher prevalence of antisemitic attitudes within Labour than any other party." It was critical of Corbyn's response to antisemitic incidents against Labour MPs and described the Chakrabarti inquiry as "ultimately compromised". The report also found that "the failure of Labour to deal consistently and effectively with anti-Semitic incidents in recent years risks lending force to allegations that elements of the Labour movement are institutionally anti-Semitic".

== 2017 ==
=== General election ===
During the 2017 general election campaign, JLM chairman Jeremy Newmark said that "Jeremy Corbyn appears to have failed to understand the nature of contemporary anti-Semitism in the same way that it's understood by most of its target group". Labour MP Wes Streeting criticised the party's record, saying "I don't think many Jewish voters in my constituency have been very impressed with the way Labour as a whole have responded", but denied that Corbyn was antisemitic. According to polling in 2015, politicians' attitudes towards Israel influenced the vote of three out of four British Jews.

It is estimated that 26% of Jewish voters voted for Labour. Analysis by election analysts academics Stephen Fisher et al., suggested that, in the five UK constituencies where more than 10% of the population (2011) identify as Jewish – Finchley and Golders Green (21%), Hendon (17%), Hertsmere (14%), Hackney North and Stoke Newington (11%) and Bury South (10%) – Labour's vote share at the 2017 general election increased by seven share points on average, almost three points less than the national average. This included an above-average swing to Labour in Hackney North and Stoke Newington.

=== Hate speech ===
During the 2017 Labour Party Conference, new rules on hate speech were adopted, as proposed by JLM and supported by Corbyn. Previously, party members could not be disciplined for "the mere holding or expression of beliefs and opinions". Under the new rules, those who express antisemitic or other forms of hate speech, including racism, Islamophobia, sexism and homophobia, or other "conduct prejudicial to the Party", could be disciplined.

=== Public letter ===
In November 2017, Jewish authors Howard Jacobson, Simon Schama, and Simon Sebag Montefiore in a letter to The Times, said "We are alarmed that during the past few years, constructive criticism of Israeli governments has morphed into something closer to antisemitism under the cloak of so-called anti-Zionism", further stating "Although anti-Zionists claim innocence of any antisemitic intent, anti-Zionism frequently borrows the libels of classical Jew-hating," and adding "Accusations of international Jewish conspiracy and control of the media have resurfaced to support false equations of Zionism with colonialism and imperialism, and the promotion of vicious, fictitious parallels with genocide and Nazism".

== 2018 ==
=== Relationship with the Jewish community ===
In March 2018, BDBJ and the Jewish Leadership Council (JLC) issued an open letter stating that Corbyn was "repeatedly found alongside people with blatantly anti-Semitic views", concluding that Corbyn "cannot seriously contemplate anti-Semitism, because he is so ideologically fixed within a far-left worldview that is instinctively hostile to mainstream Jewish communities". Hundreds of protestors outside Parliament Square Labour Party antisemitism, demanding that Corbyn do more to tackle anti-Jewish feeling. Jewish Voice for Labour (JVL) organised a smaller counter-demonstration.

In April 2018, Corbyn attended a "third night" Passover Seder celebration held in his constituency by radical Jewish group Jewdas. JLC criticised Corbyn for attending the event, while BDBJ said: "If Jeremy Corbyn goes to their event, how can we take his stated commitment to be an ally against anti-Semitism seriously?" Charlotte Nichols, Young Labour's women's officer and Jewdas member, commended Corbyn for attending the event, arguing that it was "absolutely right" for Corbyn to "engage with the community at all levels" and that many of the event attendees "are absolutely part of the 'mainstream community'".

In April 2018, following a meeting with Corbyn to discuss antisemitism in Labour, JLC and BDBJ said "We are disappointed that Mr Corbyn's proposals fell short of the minimum level of action which our letter suggested. In particular, they did not agree in the meeting with our proposals that there should be a fixed timetable to deal with antisemitism cases; that they should expedite the long-standing cases involving Ken Livingstone and Jackie Walker; that no MP should share a platform with somebody expelled or suspended for antisemitism; that they adopt the full International Holocaust Remembrance Alliance definition of antisemitism with all its examples and clauses; that there should be transparent oversight of their disciplinary process". Corbyn described the meeting as "positive and constructive" and re-iterated that he was "absolutely committed" to rooting out antisemitism in Labour.

In April 2018, the Israeli Labor Party, JLM's sister party, led by Avi Gabbay, announced it would cut ties with Corbyn and his office due to their handling of antisemitism, but retain ties with Labour as a whole. In a letter to Corbyn, Gabbay wrote of "my responsibility to acknowledge the hostility that you have shown to the Jewish community and the antisemitic statements and actions you have allowed".

In August 2018, Corbyn said that antisemitism was a "problem that the Labour Party is working to overcome". He said that criticism of Israel may stray into antisemitism at times, but denied that all forms of anti-Zionism were inherently racist, and pledged to root out antisemitism within the party, saying: "People who dish out anti-Semitic poison need to understand: You do not do it in my name. You are not my supporters and have no place in our movement." In a video release a few days later, Corbyn apologised again, saying, "I acknowledge there is a real problem of antisemitism that Labour is working to overcome. I am sorry for the hurt that has been caused to many Jewish people". In the same month, Corbyn denied that he or Labour posed an "existential threat".

In September 2018, at Labour Conference, Corbyn said he wants Labour and the Jewish community to "work together and draw a line" under antisemitism. He went on to attack the Conservative Party for accusing Labour of "anti-Semitism one day, then endorse Viktor Orbán's hard-right government the next day".

=== March–April ===
Controversies erupted about incidents in Jeremy Corbyn's backbench record.

==== Freedom for Humanity mural ====
American artist Mear One painted a street mural entitled Freedom for Humanity in east London in 2012. The artwork depicted what Mear One described as an "elite banker cartel" of the Rothschilds, the Rockefellers, the Morgans and others sitting around a Monopoly-style board game on the backs of men with dark complexions. The temporary mural was removed by Tower Hamlets council following complaints by residents. Mayor Lutfur Rahman said "the images of the bankers perpetuate antisemitic propaganda about conspiratorial Jewish domination of financial and political institutions". In response, Mear One denied that the mural was antisemitic; he said that the mural was about "class and privilege", and pointed out that the figures depicted included both "Jewish and white Anglos".

Corbyn, responding to a Facebook post from the artist that contained an image of the mural and was written before it had been criticised, saying, "Tomorrow they want to buff my mural Freedom of Expression," had written: "Why? You are in good company. Rockerfeller [sic] destroyed Diego Viera's [sic] mural because it includes a picture of Lenin," an apparent reference to Nelson Rockefeller's destruction of Diego Rivera's Man at the Crossroads fresco in 1934.

In March 2018, Labour MP Luciana Berger asked Corbyn why he had questioned the removal of a mural showing a member of the Rothschild family as it did. Corbyn said, "I sincerely regret that I did not look more closely at the image I was commenting on, the contents of which are deeply disturbing and antisemitic". "The defence of free speech cannot be used as a justification for the promotion of antisemitism in any form." Karen Pollock of the Holocaust Educational Trust said that the mural was "indefensible" as it "was blatantly anti-Semitic, using images commonly found in anti-Semitic propaganda". Jeremy Gilbert argued that this accusation was based on a logical fallacy, saying that the allegation "amounts to a mere argument from resemblance: because anti-capitalist discourse and anti-Semitic discourse share some structural features, they are fundamentally the same". According to Deborah E. Lipstadt, echoed in local media, the Jewish caricatures resembled the imagery used by Der Stürmer in Nazi Germany.

==== Comments about certain Zionists ====
In a January 2013 meeting in Parliament, UK Palestinian Authority representative Manuel Hassassian said that Jews are "the only children of God ... because nobody is stopping Israel building its messianic dream of Eretz Israel [the Land of Israel]". Pro-Israel activists at the meeting then challenged Hassassian. In August 2018, MailOnline released footage of comments that Corbyn had made a few days after this event at Friends House in Euston, convened by the Palestinian Return Centre. He defended Hassassian's comments, which, he said, were "dutifully recorded by the thankfully silent Zionists" in the audience. Corbyn went on to say that these "Zionists" had two problems: "One is that they don't want to study history and secondly, having lived in this country for a very long time, probably all their lives, they don't understand English irony either. Manuel [Hassassian] does understand English irony and uses it very, very effectively so I think they need two lessons which we can help them with".

His comments were accused by some of coded antisemitism, including by Labour MPs Luciana Berger, Wes Streeting, Mike Gapes and Catherine McKinnell. Conservative MPs reported Corbyn to the parliamentary standards watchdog over the comments. Deborah Lipstadt asserted that Corbyn had crossed the line from anti-Zionism to antisemitism. Corbyn's remarks were defended by shadow chancellor John McDonnell, who argued that the comments were taken out of context. A Labour spokesperson said that parts of the speech which contexualised Corbyn's language were "edited out of the footage ... He had been speaking about Zionists and non-Zionist Jews and very clearly does not go on to use Zionists as any kind of shorthand for Jews".

In April 2018, Terry Couchman, an election candidate of the party, was suspended over his use of "ZioNazi" in a post criticising Israel. Tony Greenstein, another then-member of the party, was accused of antisemitism and expelled from the party in 2018 for using the term "Zios" among other allegations.

=== Facebook groups ===
In March 2018, it was reported that, in 2014, Corbyn and some of his staff had been members of three private Facebook groups, including "Palestine Live" and "History of Palestine", containing antisemitic posts. A spokesman said that Corbyn had been added to the first two groups by others, had little involvement in them, and had either left them already or left following the reports. Labour stated that a full investigation would be undertaken and action taken against any member involved.

At the beginning of April, The Sunday Times reported that it had uncovered over 2,000 examples of antisemitic, racist, violent threats and abusive posts in Corbyn-supporting private Facebook groups, including frequent attacks on Jews and Holocaust-denying material. The 20 largest pro-Corbyn private Facebook groups, with combined membership of over 400,000, were reported to have as members 12 senior staff who worked for Corbyn and shadow chancellor John McDonnell. Many of the posts criticised Labour MP Berger and Jonathan Arkush, president of BDBJ. A Labour Party spokesperson said the groups "are not officially connected to the party in any way". Labour MPs urged Corbyn to instruct his supporters to shut down groups containing abusive posts. Subsequently, Corbyn deleted his personal Facebook account, which he had set up before becoming Labour leader, although his official page remained.

==== Corbyn's responses ====
In March 2018, in response to claims that he may be seen as antisemitic, Corbyn stated, "I'm not an anti-Semite in any form" and that he challenges "anti-Semitism whenever it arises and no anti-Semitic remarks are done in my name or would ever be done in my name". In the same month, Corbyn said that he would not tolerate antisemitism "in and around" Labour. "We must stamp this out from our party and movement", he said. "We recognise that anti-Semitism has occurred in pockets within Labour, causing pain and hurt to our Jewish community in Labour and the rest of the country. I am sincerely sorry for the pain which has been caused, and pledge to redouble my efforts to bring this anxiety to an end". The following month, writing in the Evening Standard, Corbyn said, "We have not done enough fully to get to grips with the problem, and for that the Jewish community and our own Jewish members deserve an apology. My party and I are sorry for the hurt and distress caused".

=== Christine Shawcroft resignation ===
In March 2018, Christine Shawcroft, the recently appointed head of the Party's disputes panel, resigned after it emerged she had opposed the suspension of Peterborough council candidate Alan Bull, for what she called "a Facebook post taken completely out of context and alleged to show anti-Semitism". She later said that she had not seen the Facebook post in question. Bull, in 2015, had shared in a closed Facebook group an article suggesting that the Holocaust was a hoax to "invite discussion and debate". Bull later said "I'm not an anti-Semite, I am not a Holocaust denier – I support equal rights for Palestinian people".

=== Holocaust Remembrance Alliance definition ===
In December 2016, Labour adopted the International Holocaust Remembrance Alliance (IHRA) Working Definition of Antisemitism. It was criticised for this in 2017 by JVL and in 2018 by writer and scholar of antisemitism Antony Lerman.

==== Revision ====
In July 2018, Labour's NEC (NEC) adopted a new code of conduct defining antisemitism for disciplinary purposes, intended to make the process more efficient and transparent. It included the IHRA definition, but amended or omitted four of the eleven examples, all relating to Israel, and added three others.

BDBJ and JLC said that the new rules "only dilute the definition and further erode the existing lack of confidence that British Jews have in their sincerity to tackle anti-Semitism within the Labour movement". MP Margaret Hodge called Corbyn a "fucking anti-Semite and a racist." Law lecturer Tom Frost said the code ignored the Macpherson Principle that "A racist incident is any incident which is perceived to be racist by the victim or any other person." On 16 July, over 60 British rabbis said that Labour had "chosen to ignore the Jewish community", and that it was "not Labour's place to rewrite a definition of antisemitism". Later in July, in an unprecedented move, three UK Jewish newspapers, The Jewish Chronicle, Jewish News and Jewish Telegraph, carried a joint editorial saying that a Corbyn government would be an "existential threat to Jewish life" in the UK, which David Patrikarakos said was the most drastic step taken by the Anglo-Jewish community since Oliver Cromwell allowed Jews back into the country in the 1650s. Former chief rabbi Lord Jonathan Sacks in turn stated that Labour's antisemitism was causing British Jews to consider leaving the country.

==== Defence ====
Human rights solicitor Geoffrey Bindman said, "The new code of conduct on antisemitism seeks to establish that antisemitism cannot be used as a pretext for censorship without evidence of antisemitic intent in line with the view of the all-party Commons home affairs select committee in October 2016 that the IHRA definition should only be adopted if qualified by caveats making clear that it is not antisemitic to criticise the Israeli government without additional evidence to suggest antisemitic intent... Far from watering down or weakening it, Labour's code strengthens it by addressing forms of discrimination that the IHRA overlooked." Geoffrey Robertson QC made a similar point. Brian Klug said "The IHRA code is a living document, subject to revision and constantly needing to be adapted to the different contexts in which people apply its definition. This is the spirit in which the drafters of Labour's code have approached their task." Historian Geoffrey Alderman wrote: "This Labour Party row will not be settled by relying on a flawed and faulty definition of antisemitism."

==== Outcome and media review ====
In September, all 11 examples were accepted by the NEC, while Jeremy Corbyn said that they would not prevent criticism of the Israeli government or advocating Palestinian rights.

Also in September, the Media Reform Coalition examined over 250 articles and broadcast news segments covering the issue, and found over 90 examples of what it considered to be misleading or inaccurate reporting. The research found evidence of "overwhelming source imbalance", in which Labour's critics dominated coverage that failed to include those defending the code or critiquing the IHRA definition, and omitted contextual facts about the IHRA definition, concluding these were "systematic reporting failures" disadvantaging Labour leadership.

In July, JVL asked its members for help in delivering an "expanded programme" of antisemitism training to party members in response to what it called a "growing number of requests".

In 2018, JLM was invited to provide antisemitism awareness training to those subject to disciplinary proceedings but declined as they did not believe training was an appropriate sanction.

=== 2010-11 Holocaust remembrance incidents ===
In January 2010, during the UK's Holocaust Memorial week, Corbyn had co-chaired a meeting in the House of Commons, with the main talk by anti-Zionist Auschwitz survivor Hajo Meyer entitled, "The Misuse of the Holocaust for Political Purposes", in which Israel was compared to Nazis. Meyer said "Judaism in Israel has been substituted by the Holocaust religion, whose high priest is Elie Wiesel." In August 2018, MP Louise Ellman told the BBC that she was "absolutely appalled" at Corbyn for chairing Meyer's talk. When asked about his involvement, Corbyn said, "Views were expressed at the meeting which I do not accept or condone. In the past, in pursuit of justice for the Palestinian people and peace in Israel/Palestine, I have on occasion appeared on platforms with people whose views I completely reject. I apologise for the concerns and anxiety that this has caused".

In January 2011, a motion had been submitted to rename Holocaust Memorial Day to "Genocide Memorial Day", supported by 23 MPs, mainly from Labour and including Corbyn. In 2018, Karen Pollock, chief executive of the Holocaust Educational Trust said, "Holocaust Memorial Day already rightly includes all victims of the Nazis and subsequent genocides, but the Holocaust was a specific crime, with anti-Semitism at its core. Any attempt to remove that specificity is a form of denial and distortion." Labour responded by saying that "this was a cross-party initiative, jointly sponsored by a senior Conservative MP, to emphasize the already broader character of Holocaust Memorial Day. It is not our policy to seek a name change for this important commemoration".

== 2019 ==
In February and July 2019, Labour issued information on investigations into complaints of antisemitism against individuals, with around 350 members resigning, being expelled or receiving formal warnings, equating to around 0.06% of the party's membership. In February, nine MPs resigned from the party, citing Labour's leftward political direction and its handling of allegations of antisemitism and of Brexit – most of them then formed The Independent Group.

=== Peter Willsman comments ===
In May 2019, Labour NEC member Peter Willsman asserted that the Israeli embassy were "behind all this antisemitism" and were "the ones whipping it all up". He added: "They caught somebody in Labour. It turns out they were an agent in the Israeli Embassy", referring to The Lobby.

=== Training and education ===
In March, Labour announced that a short course in antisemitism would be developed by the Pears Institute for the Study of Antisemitism and that Jewish communal organisations would be consulted. The intention would be to enrol staff, NCC, and NEC members on the course. JLM, which had provided volunteer-led training for the past three years, then withdrew its training provision for branches.

In June, Labour peer Peter Hain and former Israeli negotiator in peace talks Daniel Levy argued that "actually the problem is political, and therefore requires a political not simply a procedural solution". In July 2019, Labour MP Clive Lewis wrote that: "Expulsions alone will not solve Labour's antisemitism crisis. Political education about antisemitism can help to ensure a socialist politics based on real equality becomes the common sense across the party."

In July, Labour appointed Heather Mendick as a liaison officer to improve the party's relationships with the Jewish community. JLC chair Jonathan Goldstein objected to the appointment and said that JLC would not be engaging with Mendick.

Later in July, Labour issued an online leaflet entitled "No Place For Antisemitism" alongside related documents and videos, as the launch of a programme of educating members on oppression and social liberation, and to help them confront racism and bigotry. This was promoted to all party members by a Corbyn email.

==== John A. Hobson's foreword ====
In 2011, Corbyn had written the foreword for a republication of the 1902 book Imperialism: A Study, by John A. Hobson, which contains the assertion that finance was controlled "by men of a single and peculiar race, who have behind them many centuries of financial experience" who "are in a unique position to control the policy of nations". In his foreword, Corbyn called the book a "great tome" and "brilliant, and very controversial at the time". Corbyn was criticised for his words in 2019, after his foreword was reported by Conservative peer Daniel Finkelstein. Corbyn responded that the language used to describe minorities in Hobson's work is "absolutely deplorable", but asserted that his foreword analysed "the process which led to the first world war" which he saw as the subject of the book and not Hobson's language.

Hobson was also cited and praised by previous Labour leaders. In 2005, Gordon Brown had said in a Chatham House speech: "This idea of liberty as empowerment is not a new idea, J. A. Hobson asked, 'is a man free who has not equal opportunity with his fellows of such access to all material and moral means of personal development and work as shall contribute to his own welfare and that of his society?'" Tony Blair had described Hobson as "probably the most famous Liberal convert to what was then literally 'new Labour'."

=== Disciplinary processes, outcomes and staff claims ===
==== Disciplinary ====
In April 2018, the new Labour General Secretary, Jennie Formby, announced that a team of lawyers had been seconded to handle disciplinary cases and that a new post of in-house general counsel would "advise on disciplinary matters and improvements to our processes".

In September 2018, the NEC approved a doubling of the size of the party's key disciplinary body, the NCC, in order to speed the handling of antisemitism claims.

In February 2019, Formby noted that the Governance and Legal Unit had suffered during 2018 from a high level of staff sickness and departures. She said that the unit was now back to full strength and that its size would be more than doubled.

Later in the month, Lord Falconer accepted an invitation to examine Labour's processes in order to increase transparency although this did not take place due to the announcement of the Equality and Human Rights Commission's investigation. Formby asked that a request by Deputy Labour Leader Tom Watson to Labour parliamentarians, asking that complaints about antisemitism be copied to him for monitoring, be disregarded on the grounds that this would disrupt the official process and be in breach of data protection law.

In May, Labour NEC member Jon Lansman wrote that leaked emails "...suggest that former compliance unit officials from the Labour right may have delayed action on some of the most extreme and high-profile antisemitism cases, including Holocaust denial, allowing a backlog of cases to build up that would damage the party and Jeremy's leadership." He also accused former General Secretary Iain McNicol and his team of delaying action on handling antisemitism cases, and allowing a backlog of cases to build up that would damage the party and Jeremy Corbyn's leadership.

In July 2019, a Labour spokesperson said that the rate at which antisemitism cases had been dealt with had increased fourfold after Formby took her position in May 2018. In August 2019, JVL said that Labour's processes had greatly improved since April 2018.

Later in July, NEC agreed to speed up determination of the most serious cases. This would be accomplished by giving a special panel, composed of the General Secretary and NEC officers, the authority to consider the cases and expel members. The panel would replace the process requiring the cases to be referred to the quasi-judicial NCC. The rule change would be submitted for approval to Labour Conference in September 2019.

In June 2020, following Keir Starmer's election as leader, it was reported that "a trusted ally of the Labour leader" had been appointed a "management enforcer" to oversee the management of allegations of antisemitism. According to a party source, "For anyone seeking to stay in their jobs it would not be sensible to disobey the new manager's requests. The manager has also been given the power to step in and make decisions himself about cases."

==== Disciplinary outcomes ====
In February 2019, Corbyn reiterated,

"As leader ... I wish to set out my own commitment along with that of the wider shadow cabinet as the leaders of Labour in parliament to root out antisemitism. I am determined we will defeat racism wherever we see it and I know that antisemitism is one of the oldest, nastiest and most persistent forms of racism."

A week later, he said in Parliament, "(Antisemitism has) no place whatsoever in any of our political parties, in our lives, in our society".

Also in February, Formby announced to Labour MPs that, of the complaints about antisemitism received by the party from April 2018 to January 2019, 400 related to individuals who were not party members. In a further 220 cases, Labour had found that there was insufficient evidence of a breach of party rules. Some of the remaining 453 complaints, i.e. those with sufficient evidence of a breach of party rules, related to years-old social media posts. These complaints received over the ten-month period represented 0.06% of Labour's 540,000 membership. Investigations had resulted in 12 expulsions and 49 resignations from the party and 187 formal warnings, while some more recent complaints were still under investigation. Some Labour MPs questioned the data's accuracy.

In July 2019, Corbyn said

"While other political parties and some of the media exaggerate and distort the scale of the problem in our party, we must face up to the unsettling truth that a small number of Labour members hold anti-Semitic views and a larger number don't recognise anti-Semitic stereotypes and conspiracy theories. The evidence is clear enough. The worst cases of anti-Semitism in our party have included Holocaust denial, crude Jewish-banker stereotypes, conspiracy theories blaming Israel for 9/11 or every war on the Rothschild family, and even one member who appeared to believe that Hitler had been misunderstood. I am sorry for the hurt that has been caused to many Jewish people. We have been too slow in processing disciplinary cases of mostly online anti-Semitic abuse by party members. We are acting to speed this process up. People who hold anti-Semitic views have no place in Labour. They may be few – the number of cases over the past three years represents less than 0.1% of Labour's membership of more than half a million – but one is too many."

In July 2019, Formby provided updated figures regularly publishing statistics. During the first six months of 2019, 625 complaints about members had been received, with some the subject of multiple complaints, and 116 members suspended. A further 658 complaints were received about non-members. Of the complaints rest, Labour decided that 100 lacked sufficient evidence and 163 showed no rule breaches, 90 received formal warnings or reminders of conduct and 97 wer referred to the NCC. 146 cases were still in process. NEC antisemitism panels had met six times and made 190 decisions, compared with two and eight in the same period the previous year. The NCC had concluded 28 cases and made eight expulsions with another twelve members resigning, compared with ten, seven and three in the same period the previous year.

In January 2020, Labour reported that 149 members resigned or were expelled during 2019 as a result of disciplinary processes relating to antisemitism. Of these, 45 members were expelled, compared to ten in 2018 and one in 2017. NEC disciplinary panels heard 274 cases, compared with 28 cases in 2017. 296 members were suspended, compared to 98 in 2018, itself a big increase on the previous year. After the September 2019 annual conference gave NEC panels the power to expel, twice the number of people were expelled in two months than had been expelled during 2018.

==== Claims by former staff ====
In April, Labour's lawyers wrote to its former head of disputes asking what information he had shared with the media and for his commitment to not further breach his non-disclosure agreement. In July, an edition of programme Panorama entitled "Is Labour Anti-Semitic?" produced by John Ware, included a claim by former staff that, in the first half of 2018, senior Labour figures had interfered in the complaints process while new senior officials in their department downgraded outcomes. Labour denied any interference. Labour added "The Panorama programme was not a fair or balanced investigation. It was a seriously inaccurate, politically one-sided polemic, which breached basic journalistic standards, invented quotes and edited emails to change their meaning." BBC responded that "the investigation was not pre-determined, it was driven by the evidence". Labour later submitted a formal complaint about the programme. Staff members represented by the GMB trade union voted overwhelmingly to call on the Party to be consistent in supporting whistle-blowers wherever they worked and to apologise to their former colleagues.

=== Resignations ===
In August 2018, Labour MP Frank Field resigned as Labour whip over a "culture...of nastiness". He retained his party membership, announcing that he would sit as an "independent Labour MP". Andrew Grice and others suggested that Field left before he was deselected by his local party, as he had lost a vote of confidence in his constituency over his support for Theresa May's Brexit plans in a parliamentary vote.

In February, seven MPs quit Labour to form The Independent Group (latterly Change UK), citing their dissatisfaction with the party's leftward political direction, its approach to Brexit and to allegations of antisemitism. They were later joined by four more MPs, including three from the Conservative Party. Another MP resigned from Labour to sit as an independent. One of the original seven, Lucinda Berger, said that Labour had become "sickeningly institutionally racist". Four of the MPs had recently lost no-confidence votes, while two such motions against Berger had been withdrawn. Following its failure to secure any seats in May 2019 European Parliament election, six of its MPs resigned to sit as independents.

In July, three peers, David Triesman, Leslie Arnold Turnberg. and Ara Darzi resigned to sit as independents, citing dissatisfaction with the party's handling of antisemitism, Brexit, and defence policy.

In October 2019, MP Louise Ellman resigned from the party, citing her worries about antisemitism and opposition to a Corbyn-led government. Labour responded that "Jeremy Corbyn and Labour are fully committed to the support, defence and celebration of the Jewish community and continue to take robust action to root out antisemitism in the party and wider society." Motions of no confidence in Ellman had been submitted for discussion in three branches of her constituency. Riverside constituency Labour party said: "[S]he made it very clear at the last CLP meeting that she could not support a Jeremy Corbyn-led government. This inevitably meant that Louise would be triggered and was very unlikely to win any reselection process."

=== External investigations ===
In November 2018, the Metropolitan Police Commissioner Cressida Dick announced that they had been passed an internal Labour dossier detailing 45 allegations of antisemitic hate crimes committed by Labour members and would review them.

In May 2019, following complaints submitted by JLM and the Campaign Against Antisemitism (CAA), the Equality and Human Rights Commission (EHRC) launched a formal investigation into whether Labour had "unlawfully discriminated against, harassed or victimised people because they are Jewish": specifically, whether "unlawful acts have been committed by the party and/or its employees and/or its agents, and; whether the party has responded to complaints of unlawful acts in a lawful, efficient and effective manner." In 2016, Labour MP Harriet Harman had expressed concern about the suitability of its chair, David Isaac, given his principal role as an equity partner at a City law firm that advises the Conservative government, Pinsent Masons. Previously, in September 2017, EHRC Chief Executive Rebecca Hilsenrath had demanded a zero tolerance approach and swift action to deal with it. Antony Lerman, former founding director of the Institute for Jewish Policy Research, raised concerns that such a statement made Hilsenrath unsuitable to lead a probe. He wrote, "Prior to investigation, is it not worrying that the CEO already claims to know what Labour needs to do?" Hilsenrath later recused herself from the decision to investigate Labour as her status as "an active member of the Anglo-Jewish community" could cause a perception of bias. Labour asked EHRC to communicate any interim recommendations.

JVL welcomed the investigation by EHRC. The organisation produced a dossier for EHRC in response to its request for evidence in relation to its investigation. JVL held that without making public the complaints and Labour's response when EHRC shared them ahead of launching the investigation, EHRC had violated the Equality Act 2006 which requires that they specify investigation targets and "the nature of the unlawful act" they are suspected of committing, both required by its own terms of reference.

=== Criticism of Labour Party advocates ===
In 2019, those seeking to defend Labour and some members from what they saw as unfair or exaggerated allegations themselves came under attack. MP Chris Williamson was suspended and investigated after he was recorded saying, "The party that has done more to stand up to racism is now being demonised as a racist, bigoted party. I have got to say I think our party's response has been partly responsible for that because in my opinion... we have backed off too much, we have given too much ground, we have been too apologetic...We've done more to address the scourge of antisemitism than any other political party. And yet we are being traduced". As with Jackie Walker and Labour Against the Witchhunt, efforts were made to prevent him speaking at events. Before the 2019 general election, Labour banned Williamson from standing as a Labour candidate.

Pro-Corbyn websites, such as The Canary, were the target of an advertising boycott campaign by Stop Funding Fake News, which said that The Canary regularly published "fake news" and attempts to "justify antisemitism" and that two of its writers had made antisemitic comments. According to Jewish News, the campaign had been backed by Rachel Riley, who campaigns against the party leadership's handling of allegations of antisemitism, while The Canary called the accusations a smear and those behind the campaign "political Zionists". Research by the Community Security Trust identified a number of pro-Corbyn and pro-Labour social media accounts that claimed that allegations of antisemitism in the party were "exaggerated, weaponised, invented or blown out of proportion, or that Labour and Corbyn are victims of a smear campaign relating to antisemitism".

=== Response to attack on rabbi ===
After an Israeli rabbi was attacked whilst visiting London in November, Corbyn phoned Rabbi Herschel Gluck, chairperson of Jewish neighbourhood watch organisation Shomrim, to express his concern for and empathy with the community. He tweeted that "We must stop this scourge of antisemitism". Gluck commented that the community appreciated Corbyn's concern and that Corbyn was the only party leader who called.

=== December election ===
During the 2019 general election, Corbyn apologised on ITV's This Morning programme. A few days before, other members of the shadow cabinet, including Nia Griffith, Richard Burgon and John McDonnell, apologised for antisemitism in their party.

=== Chief Rabbi Ephraim Mirvis ===
In his leader's interview with Corbyn, Andrew Neil dedicated the first 10 minutes of the 30-minute programme entirely to discussion of Labour's relationship with the Jewish community. This interview drew attention as Corbyn refused to apologise for antisemitism in Labour, even though he had repeatedly done so before. The UK's Chief Rabbi, Ephraim Mirvis, made an unprecedented intervention in politics, warning that antisemitism was a "poison sanctioned from the top" of Labour, and saying that British Jews were gripped by anxiety about the prospect of a Corbyn-led government. Justin Welby, the Archbishop of Canterbury, the Muslim Council of Britain and the Hindu Council UK partially supported Rabbi Mirvis's intervention.

==== JLM and the 2019 general election ====
Labour's only Jewish affiliate, JLM, said they would not actively campaign for Labour except for exceptional candidates.

== 2020 ==
=== Keir Starmer ===
On 4 April, leader Starmer expressed the view that "Antisemitism has been a stain on our party" and apologised to the Jewish community, vowing to fight it. Starmer had previously made eliminating antisemitism in Labour one of his main campaign issues, and said he would take steps to eradicate it "on day one" of his assuming party leadership. He also said he would look to fully cooperate with EHRC's investigation into antisemitism in the party.

=== Internal investigation into Labour's Governance and Legal Unit ===
The following week, Sky News reported that the 860-page antisemitism report would be withheld on advice of counsel. The report concluded that "no evidence" had been found that antisemitism complaints were treated any differently than other forms of complaint, or of current or former staff being "motivated by antisemitic intent". The report stated that Corbyn's team inherited a lack of "robust processes, systems, training, education and effective line management" and that hostility towards Corbyn by former senior officials contributed to "a litany of mistakes" that "affected the expeditious and resolute handling of disciplinary complaints", including providing "false and misleading information" to Corbyn's office on the scale and handling of antisemitism allegations. The report urged EHRC to "question the validity of the personal testimonies" of former members of staff. Furthermore, The Independent, which saw the report, stated that it said that staffers associated with Labour's right-wing sought to undermine Corbyn and prevent Labour from winning the 2017 general election in the hope that a poor result would trigger a leadership contest.

On 23 April, NEC met to set the terms of reference for the independent investigation into the circumstances, contents, and release of an internal report to conclude with its own report to be published by mid-July. Several amendments were passed by the NEC, including one by Rayner that referred to the offer of whistleblower protections. On 1 May, NEC appointed a four-person panel to investigate the report. Martin Forde QC, a barrister was chosen as chair, supported by three Labour peers: Baroness Debbie Wilcox, Lord Larry Whitty, and Baroness Ruth Lister.

In June, Labour revealed that it had suspended the membership of some party members to protect the integrity of its investigation. According to Novara Media, former party director Emilie Oldknow, who featured prominently in the leaked documents, and Patrick Heneghan, Labour's former executive director for elections, campaigns and organisation were among those suspended.

=== Rebecca Long-Bailey ===
In June 2020, Rebecca Long-Bailey was asked to resign as Shadow Secretary of State for Education by Starmer after she shared a link to an Independent interview actor Maxine Peake which contained:

"The tactics used by the police in America, kneeling on George Floyd's neck, that was learnt from seminars with Israeli secret services."

The original article stated that "the Israeli police has denied this". Starmer said that the article should not have been shared by Long-Bailey "as it contained anti-Semitic conspiracy theories". The Independent amended the original article to add a note that "the allegation that US police were taught tactics of 'neck kneeling' by Israeli secret services is unfounded". Peake later stated that she was "inaccurate in [her] assumption of American police training and its sources". The claim had been linked to a report by Amnesty International, but Amnesty said that they had never reported that Israeli security forces had taught the technique.

The Guardian said a "series of individual MPs condemned the decision" and some did not consider Peake's allegations to be antisemitic. John McDonnell, shadow chancellor under Corbyn, said that "criticism of practices of [the] Israeli state is not anti-semitic". He did not believe that Long-Bailey should have been sacked and stood with her. NEC member Jon Lansman said: "I don't believe there is anything antisemitic in the [Maxine Peake] interview and sacking Rebecca is a reckless overreaction by Keir Starmer."

=== Steve Reed ===
In July 2020, Steve Reed used Twitter to suggest that Conservative Party donor Richard Desmond was "the puppet master to the entire Tory cabinet" in relation to the planning scandal involving Desmond and minister Robert Jenrick. The tweet was criticised as antisemitic for containing a "classic anti-Semitic trope about a Jewish businessman" and Conservative MPs asked Starmer to sack Reed. After Reed deleted the tweet and apologised, no further action was taken against him.

=== Aftermath of 2019 Panorama programme ===
In July 2020 Labour was sued for defamation by seven former members of staff who had appeared in the 2019 BBC Panorama programme Is Labour Anti-Semitic? The former staffers said senior Labour Party figures had made statements attacking their reputations and suggesting they had ulterior political and personal motives to undermine the party. When the programme aired, a Labour party spokesperson had called them "disaffected former officials" and said they had "worked actively to undermine" Corbyn and had "both personal and political axes to grind". In response to the lawsuit Starmer agreed to pay damages to the former staff members and issue a formal apology.

Corbyn expressed disappointment at Starmer's decision and said that Labour was risking "giving credibility to misleading and inaccurate allegations about action taken to tackle anti-Semitism in Labour in recent years" and that the settlements were a "political decision, not a legal one". In response, the show's presenter John Ware sued Corbyn personally. A fundraising campaign, set up with an initial target of £20,000 to help Corbyn with legal fees, surpassed £270,000 within days. Starmer's decision prompted Labour's largest backer, the trade union Unite led by Len McCluskey, to review its donations. McCluskey said "It's an abuse of members' money. ... It's as though a huge sign has been put up outside Labour with 'queue here with your writ and get your payment over there' ".

=== Publication of EHRC report and Corbyn suspension ===
On 29 October 2020, EHRC published their report, stating, "serious failings in Labour leadership in addressing antisemitism and an inadequate process for handling antisemitism complaints". The report found evidence of political interference into complaints of antisemitism, failure to provide training to handle complaints of antisemitism, and harassment, in breach of the Equality Act 2010.

After the publication, Corbyn said his team had "acted to speed up, not hinder the process", and that the scale of antisemitism within Labour had been "dramatically overstated for political reasons". Corbyn was suspended pending investigation from Labour when he refused to retract his remarks.

== 2021–present ==
=== Exclusion of alleged far-left factions ===
In July, NEC voted to ban four factions that they described as on the far-left, including Resist, Labour Against the Witchhunt, the Labour in Exile Network, and Socialist Appeal, on the grounds that "these organisations are not compatible with Labour's rules or our aims and values". These factions had been accused of obstructing efforts to combat antisemitism. The party committee ruled that belonging to these factions was grounds for expulsion; that future complaints would be handled by an independent appeal body; and that all prospective Labour candidates would be trained by JLM. While JLM welcomed the announcement; the bans were condemned by Momentum and Unite the Union for targeting left-wing elements and worsening internal tensions.

=== Forde Report ===
The long-awaited Forde Report, written by lawyer Martin Forde in response to the dossier leaked in April 2020. The work of Labour's Governance and Legal Unit in relation to antisemitism, 2014–2019, was ultimately released on 19 July 2022. It reported that antisemitism had been used as a factional weapon. The report said: "[R]ather than confront the paramount need to deal with the profoundly serious issue of anti-Semitism in the party, both factions treated it as a factional weapon." It showed how senior Labour staff displayed "deplorably factional and insensitive, and at times discriminatory, attitudes" towards Corbyn and his supporters, and revealed a "hierarchy of racism" in the party that ignored Black and Asian people.

=== Discrimination against Jewish Voice for Labour ===
In 2023, lawyers representing Jewish Voice for Labour said they believed the party was breaching the 2010 Equality Act by refusing to investigate JVL's complaints of antisemitism, whilst the party instead investigated JVL's members. John McDonnell described the treatment as discriminatory, and urged Starmer's team to engage with the Forde Report to resolve the issue.

=== Israel–Hamas war ===
Labour under Starmer suspended parliamentary candidates and MPs, including Graham Jones, Andy McDonald, Azhar Ali and Kate Osamor, for their alleged antisemitic comments during the Gaza war. Jones said that Britons who had gone to Israel to fight for the Israel Defense Forces "should be locked up". Osamor wrote of an "international duty" to remember the victims of the Holocaust and that "more recent genocides in Cambodia, Rwanda, Bosnia and now Gaza" should be remembered.

In August 2024, Jewish members of Labour sent a letter to Starmer, accusing him and his party of actions worsening antisemitism. The actions specified in the Labour Against Antisemitism letter included the government dropping its objections to the International Criminal Court case against Israeli prime minister Benjamin Netanyahu and Israeli defence minister Yoav Gallant, its plans to formally recognize Palestinian statehood and proposing an arms embargo on Israel.

In October 2025, the Mayor of London, Sadiq Khan, sparked controversy for suggesting that the chant "from the river to the sea" at pro-Palestinian marches, which critics say calls for the destruction of the Jewish state, was not inherently antisemitic. His remark drew criticism from several public figures, including Labour Against Anti-Semitism co-director Alex Hearn, who stated: "For two years, Sadiq Khan's London has been the scene of marches which have given a platform for virulent anti-Jewish racism and threatened the peace and safety of the Jewish community," adding that "listening to Jewish voices calling out this hateful chant would be a good place for him to start to undo the damage."

== Statements of support ==
=== Labour movement ===
In September 2017, general secretary of Unite the Union, Len McCluskey said that the row "was created by people who were trying to undermine Jeremy Corbyn". He stated that he had never heard antisemitic language at a party meeting, adding "Unfortunately at the time there were lots of people playing games, everybody wanted to create this image that Jeremy Corbyn's leadership had become misogynist, had become racist, had become anti-Semitic and it was wrong."

In December 2017, Momentum founder Jon Lansman identified three forms of antisemitism: petty xenophobic remarks, of which he "[doesn't] think there's much" in the Party; old-school blood libel type antisemitism, which, according to Lansman, is "extremely rare"; and the Israeli–Palestinian conflict, whereby, Lansman says, "we all understand that when that conflict heats up, it results in dreadful antisemitism."

In June 2019, Labour peer Peter Hain and former Israeli negotiator in peace talks Daniel Levy said that the effect of Labour's stance on antisemitism had been "to empower apologists for totally unacceptable Israeli government attacks on Palestinians and the steady throttling of their rights – allowing those apologists to scale new heights in their dishonest attempts to label criticism of such Israeli policy as 'antisemitic'".

In August 2019, former Deputy Leader and Shadow Home Secretary Lord Hattersley said that he believed that Labour had "managed to expunge the party" of antisemitism.

=== Jewish activists and organisations ===
Some left-wing Jewish groups disputed the antisemitism claims. These include JVL, Jews for Justice for Palestinians, Jewish Socialists' Group, Jewdas and Independent Jewish Voices; all of whom agreed that accusations of antisemitism against Labour had a twofold purpose: firstly, to conflate antisemitism with criticism of Israel in order to deter such criticism and, secondly, to undermine Labour leadership.

In August 2015, dozens of Jewish activists signed an open letter criticising The Jewish Chronicle for what they viewed as its "character assassination" of Corbyn. Signatories to the letter included Laurence Dreyfus, Selma James, Miriam Margolyes, Ilan Pappé, Michael Rosen and Avi Shlaim.

In April 2016, the Jewish Socialists' Group said that antisemitism accusations were being "weaponized" in order to "attack the Jeremy Corbyn-led Labour party". It added "A very small number of such cases seem to be real instances of antisemitism. Others represent genuine criticism of Israeli policy and support for Palestinian rights".

Later that month, 82 "Jewish members and supporters of Labour and of Jeremy Corbyn's leadership" wrote an open letter stating that they "do not accept that antisemitism is 'rife' in Labour" and that "these accusations are part of a wider campaign against the Labour leadership, and they have been timed particularly to do damage to Labour and its prospects." Signatories included Miriam David, Ivor Dembina, Stephen Deutsch, Selma James, Miriam Margolyes, Charles Shaar Murray, Ian Saville and Lynne Segal.

In December 2017, Jewdas suggested that the allegations are aimed at discrediting the party and called the reaction to them a "bout of faux-outrage greased with hypocrisy and opportunism".

In February 2019, over 200 Jewish members and supporters of Labour signed a letter published in The Guardian, calling the party "a crucial ally in the fight against bigotry and reaction" and Corbyn's campaigning consistently in support for "initiatives against antisemitism". They felt that the "disproportionate focus on antisemitism on the left, which is abhorrent but relatively rare." The signatories included David Epstein, Mike Leigh, Michael Rosen, Avi Shlaim, Gillian Slovo, Annabelle Sreberny, Walter Wolfgang, Peter Buckman, Erica Burman, Keith Burstein, Miriam David, Michael Ellman, Nick Foster, Susan Himmelweit, Selma James, Ann Jungman, Frank Land, Gillian McCall, Helen Pearson and Ian Saville.

In July 2019, Andrew Feinstein, anti-corruption campaigner and executive director of Corruption Watch said, "Only a very small percentage of Labour members hold anti-semitic views and a YouGov poll in 2015 found Labour displayed the second least amount of any political party, second only to the Liberal Democrats. In 2017, two years into Jeremy Corbyn's leadership, the extent of anti-semitism in Labour had actually dropped, according to polling."

In November 2019, John Bercow, the Jewish former Speaker of the House of Commons and Conservative (and later Labour, until his suspension) MP, said he had never experienced antisemitism from a Labour Party member and after knowing Corbyn for 22 years did not believe he was antisemitic.

In November 2019, 14 British Jews signed a letter published in The Guardian describing allegation of antisemitism as "a political siege of Labour". Signatories included Antony Lerman, Lynne Segal, Jacqueline Rose, Miriam David, Brian Klug, Jonathan Rosenhead, Graeme Segal and Stephen Sedley.

=== Academics and researchers ===
In April 2018, 42 senior academics condemned anti-Corbyn bias and suggested that "Dominant sections of the media have framed the story in such a way as to suggest that antisemitism is a problem mostly to do with Labour and that Corbyn is personally responsible for failing to deal with it. The coverage has relied on a handful of sources such as Board of Deputies of British Jews, Jewish Leadership Council and well-known political opponents of Corbyn himself." Signatories included Lynne Segal, Annabelle Sreberny, Beverley Skeggs, Gary Hall, Neve Gordon, Margaret Gallagher, Maria Chatzichristodoulou, Jill Daniels and Ruth Catlow. One of the signatories, Jane Dipple of the University of Winchester, was herself investigated by her university and Labour over allegedly antisemitic posts on Facebook. In August 2018 the university said that Dipple no longer worked there.

In July 2018, philosopher and scholar of antisemitism Brian Klug wrote: "It's paradoxical if, at the moment Labour wakes up to the necessity of combating antisemitism in its ranks, it is shouted down because of its failure to deal with it in the past." In October, he wrote: "It appears that two different objectives are being conflated by Jewish leadership: confronting antisemitism and toppling Corbyn."

In March 2019, Neve Gordon, Professor of Politics and Government at Ben-Gurion University of the Negev, wrote: "the real point of contention ... is not about whether the party should tolerate anti-Semitism, but about what anti-Semitism is."

In April 2019, historian and University of Buckingham Professor of Politics Geoffrey Alderman wrote in the Jewish Telegraph that Jeremy Corbyn "has an impressive demonstrable record of supporting Jewish communal initiatives". In May, he wrote in The Spectator that "I will agree that from time to time, as backbench MP and party leader, Corbyn has acted unwisely. But the grounds for labelling him an anti-Semite simply do not exist."

Palestinian author and academic Ghada Karmi wrote that the book "shows Labour is not 'institutionally racist' but the victim of an orchestrated campaign of unfounded accusations of antisemitism."

=== Journalists and authors ===
In 2018, Mark Seddon and Francis Beckett conclude that "(t)he debate has become toxic. It's all abuse and bullying and point-scoring. It long ago ceased to concentrate on the protection of British Jews on one hand, and the creation of a better and more equal society in Britain on the other." For Matt Seaton the controversy over Labour's attitudes to Jews and antisemitism is a proxy fight whose real conflict is one of a battle for the soul of the party waged between social democrats and traditional anti-imperialist socialists.

In July 2018, writer and scholar of antisemitism Antony Lerman wrote: "after the battering Labour has experienced over the issue of antisemitism in the party since Jeremy Corbyn was elected leader and the fact nothing the party has done has succeeded in fully placating its critics... the new code [of conduct] had barely seen the light of day before it was being condemned in the harshest terms by all and sundry." In September, he noted "The default mode of almost all the mainstream media is to take as given that the party is institutionally antisemitic" and "the ever wilder doubling-down on painting Corbyn an antisemite and the increasingly desperate attempts to oust him from the leadership using hatred of Jews as a weapon with which to achieve this."

In early 2016, American political scientist Norman Finkelstein said, "The only plausible answer is, it's political. It has nothing whatsoever to do with the factual situation; instead, a few suspect cases of antisemitism – some real, some contrived – are being exploited for an ulterior political motive. As one senior Labour MP said the other day, it's transparently a smear campaign." In August 2018, writing in MondoWeiss, Finkelstein called the criticism of Corbyn and Labour 'insane' and 'hysteria' and led by powerful interests.

== Surveys and studies ==
=== General population ===
In 2015, 2016 and 2017, CAA commissioned YouGov to survey British attitudes towards Jews. The 2017 survey found that supporters of Labour were less likely to hold antisemitic views than those of the Conservative Party or the UK Independence Party (UKIP), while those of the Liberal Democrats were the least likely to hold such views. 32% of Labour supporters endorsed at least one "antisemitic attitude", as defined by the CAA, compared to 30% for the Liberal Democrat, 39% for UKIP supporters, and 40% for Conservatives.

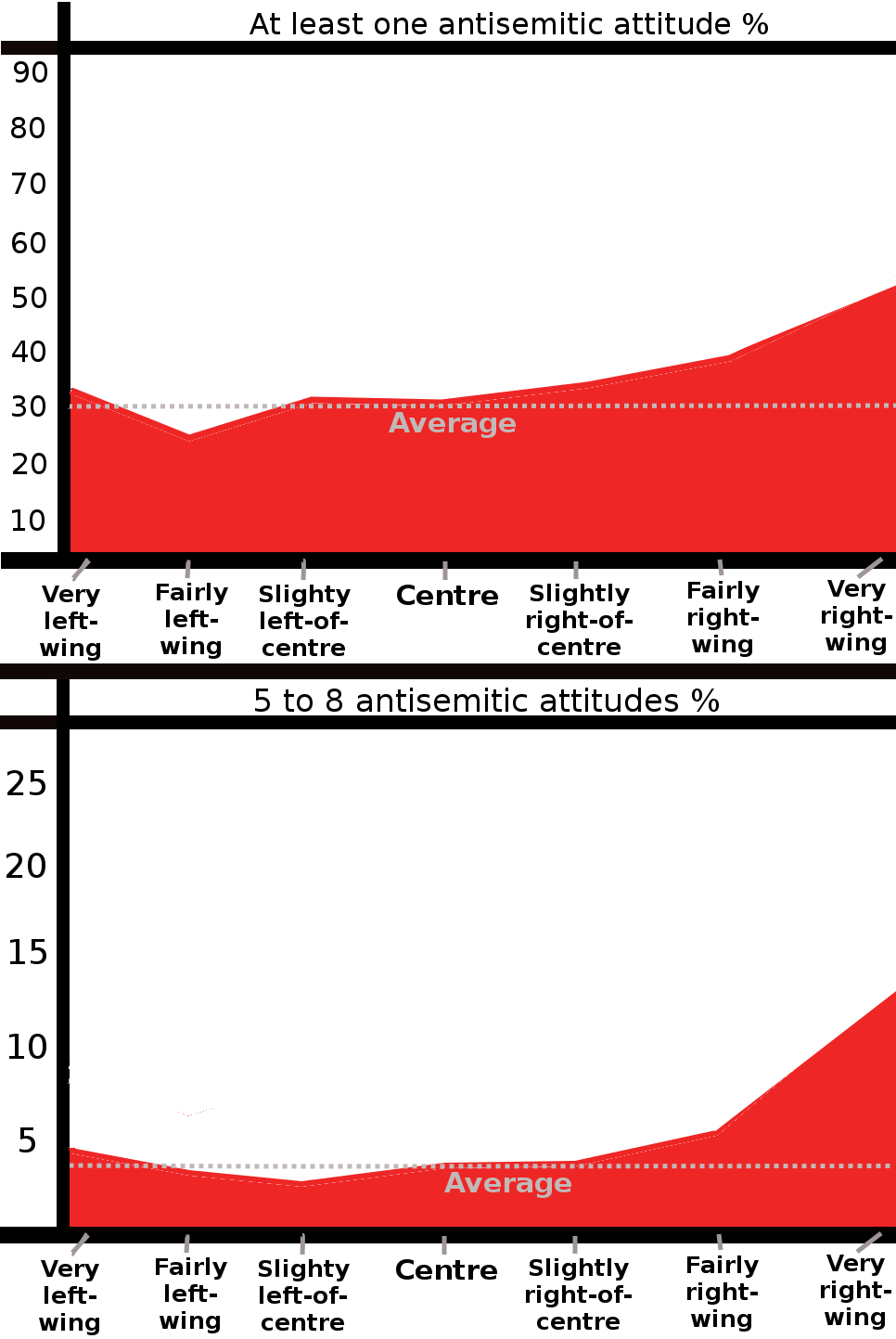
Antisemitic attitudes among the UK population by political position according to the 2017 JPR survey. Those on the left and centre have roughly average levels of antisemitism by the standards of the wider British public. Antisemitic attitudes are slightly more common among the most left wing responders but significantly less than those on the furthest right

A Populus poll during August 2018 found the wider British public did not pay much attention to the news coverage over antisemitism in Labour. Fewer than 5% rated it as the news story they had noticed most.

A study into contemporary antisemitism in Britain by the Institute for Jewish Policy Research (JPR) in September 2017 reported, "Levels of antisemitism among those on the left-wing of the political spectrum, including the far-left, are indistinguishable from those found in the general population. Yet, all parts of those on the left of the political spectrum – including the 'slightly left-of-centre,' the 'fairly left-wing' and the 'very left-wing' – exhibit higher levels of anti Israelism than average." It went on, "The most antisemitic group on the political spectrum consists of those who identify as very right-wing: the presence of antisemitic attitudes in this group is 2 to 4 times higher compared to the general population." It continued: "However, in relation to anti-Israel attitudes, the very left-wing lead: 78% (75–82%) in this group endorse at least one anti-Israel attitude, in contrast to 56% in the general population, and 23% (19–26%) hold 6–9 such attitudes, in contrast to 9% in the general population. Elevated levels of anti-Israel attitudes are also observed in other groups on the political left: the fairly left-wing and those slightly left-of-centre. The lowest level of anti-Israel attitudes is observed in the political centre and among those who are slightly right-of-centre or fairly right-wing." The report, however, stated, "...anti-Israel attitudes are not, as a general rule, antisemitic; but the stronger a person's anti-Israel views, the more likely they are to hold antisemitic attitudes. A majority of those who hold anti-Israel attitudes do not espouse any antisemitic attitudes, but a significant minority of those who hold anti-Israel attitudes hold them alongside antisemitic attitudes. Therefore, antisemitism and anti-Israel attitudes exist both separately and together." The study reported that in "surveys of attitudes towards ethnic and religious minorities... The most consistently found pattern across different surveys is heightened animosity towards Jews on the political right..." and that "The political left, captured by voting intention or actual voting for Labour, appears in these surveys as a more Jewish-friendly, or neutral, segment of the population."

=== British Jews ===
In 2017, a poll commissioned by CAA of 1,864 British Jewish adults found that 83% (in 2016, 87%) felt that Labour was too tolerant of antisemitism among its MPs, members, or supporters.

A Survation poll by The Jewish Chronicle prior to the 2017 general election found that 13% of Jews intended to vote for Labour, an increase from the 8.5% in May 2016. When asked to rank the degree of "antisemitism among the political party's members and elected representatives" between 1 (low) to 5 (high), Jews ranked Labour at 3.94, compared with 3.64 for UKIP, 2.7 for the Liberal Democrats, and 1.96 for the Conservatives.

In September 2018, a Survation survey conducted for The Jewish Chronicle found that 85.9% of British Jews considered Jeremy Corbyn antisemitic, and 85.6% considered Labour to have "high" or "very high" levels of antisemitism within the party's members and elected representatives. This compares to 1.7% and 6.1% for Theresa May and the Conservative Party respectively. This was an increase from 69% who considered the party to have "high" or "very high" levels of antisemitism in 2017.

=== Labour Party members ===
In May 2016, a YouGov poll found that 49% of Labour members felt that the party did not have a problem with antisemitism, 47% agreed that it was a problem, but "no worse than in other parties", while 5% thought that antisemitism is a bigger problem in Labour than in other parties. In March 2018, a poll showed 77% of Labour members believed the charges of antisemitism to be deliberately exaggerated to undermine the leader or stop criticism of Israel, while 19% said it was a serious issue. A July 2019 poll by YouGov amongst Labour Party members found that 70% of members thought that antisemitism in the party was a "genuine" problem.

== See also ==
- Antisemitism in the British Conservative Party
- Islamophobia in the British Conservative Party
- Racism in the British Conservative Party
- The Lobby (TV series)
- Respect Party
- Livingstone Formulation

== Sources ==
- Alderman, Geoffrey (2019). "HORRORS! CORBYN'S A 'PM IN WAITING' – ACCEPT IT". Jewish Telegraph.
- Alderman, Geoffrey (8 May 2019). "Is Jeremy Corbyn really anti-Semitic?". The Spectator. Archived from the original on 11 May 2019.
- Alderman, Geoffrey (31 July 2019). "This Labour Party row will not be settled by relying on a flawed and faulty definition of antisemitism". The Independent.
- Asthana, Anushka (16 May 2016). "Labour antisemitism inquiry will not seek evidence from Ken Livingstone". The Guardian.
- "Labour attacked on Howard poster BBC News". BBC News. 31 January 2005.
- "A guide to Labour Party anti-Semitism claims". BBC News. 3 March 2019.
- Boffey, Daniel; Sherwood, Harriet (16 October 2016). "Jeremy Corbyn accused of incompetence by MPs over antisemitic abuse". The Observer.
- Bodkin, Henry (20 August 2017). "Labour 'too tolerant' of anti-Semitism – new poll". The Telegraph.
- Burleigh, James (31 January 2005). "Labour criticised for 'anti-Semitic' Howard poster". The Independent.
- Castle, Stephen (26 July 2018). "U.K.'s Jewish Papers Denounce Labour Party as 'Existential Threat'". The New York Times.
- Delaney, Sam (2015). Mad Men & Bad Men: What Happened When British Politics Met Advertising. Faber & Faber. ISBN 978-0-571-31239-9.
- Eaton, George (29 August 2018). "Rabbi Jonathan Sacks: "The hate that begins with Jews never ends with Jews"". New Statesman.
- Elgot, Jessica (26 September 2017). "Labour to adopt new antisemitism rules after conference row". The Guardian.
- Embury-Dennis, Tom (2 September 2018). "Jonathan Sacks insists he needed to 'issue warning' by comparing Jeremy Corbyn to Enoch Powell". The Independent.
- Fisher, Stephen; Ford, Rob; Curtice, John; English, Patrick (28 September 2018). "Anti-Semitism row: How has it affected Labour's support?". BBC News.
- Gilbert, Jeremy (14 April 2018). "Antisemitism, cosmopolitanism and the politics of Labour's 'old' and 'new' right-wings". openDemocracy.
- Gordon, Neve (31 March 2019). "The witch hunt at Westminster". Al Jazeera.
- Hain, Peter; Levy, Daniel (10 June 2019). "Labour, the Left, Antisemitism, Israel and Palestine: a way forward". Open Democracy.
- Havardi, Jeremy (2016). Refuting the Anti-Israel Narrative: A Case for the Historical, Legal and Moral Legitimacy of the Jewish State. McFarland. ISBN 978-1-476-62297-2.
- Hirsh, David (2017). Contemporary Left Antisemitism. Routledge. ISBN 978-1-315-30429-8.
- Hope, Christopher (26 September 2017). "Labour activists compare Israel to Nazi Germany as Jeremy Corbyn accused of behaving like 'ostrich' over anti-Semitism". The Telegraph.
- "Labour accused of 'incompetence' in dealing with anti-Semitism allegations". ITV. 16 October 2016.
- Jacobson, Howard (6 October 2017). "The Phony Peace Between the Labour Party and Jews". The New York Times.
- Josephs, Jonathan (2 June 2017). "Election 2017: Corbyn 'failing to grasp anti-Semitism'". BBC.
- Judd, Denis; Surridge, Keith (2013). The Boer War: A History. I.B.Tauris. ISBN 978-0-857-73316-0.
- Karmi, Ghada (11 October 2019). "Why antisemitism smears could stop Corbyn becoming prime minister". Middle East Eye.
- Kelemen, Paul (2012). The British Left and Zionism: History of a Divorce. Manchester University Press. ISBN 978-0-719-08812-4.
- Klug, Brian (17 July 2018). "The Code of Conduct for Antisemitism: a tale of two texts". openDemocracy.
- Klug, Brian (20 July 2018). "Labour's code of conduct isn't antisemitic – it's a constructive initiative". The Guardian.
- Klug, Brian (17 October 2018). "The Left And The Jews: Labour's Summer of Discontent". Jewish Quarterly. Archived from the original on 26 January 2019.
- Kolpinskaya, Ekatarina (September 2014). "The British Left and Zionism: History of a Divorce (book review)". Political Studies. 13 (3): 450. doi:10.1111/1478-9302.12067_101. S2CID 149896474.
- Kushner, Tony (2017). "Antisemitism in Britain: Continuity and the Absence of a Resurgence?". In McElligott, Anthony; Herf, Jeffrey (eds.). Antisemitism Before and Since the Holocaust: Altered Contexts and Recent Perspectives. Palgrave Macmillan. pp. 253–275. ISBN 978-3-319-48866-0.
- "Lansman lances Jewish critics of Labour's new anti-Semitism code". The Times of Israel. 12 July 2018.
- Lansman, Jon (14 May 2019). "Jeremy Corbyn pushed for action on antisemitism – but was held back by bureaucracy". LabourList.
- Lerman, Antony (16 July 2018a). "Why turning to Jewish exceptionalism to fight antisemitism is a failing project". openDemocracy.
- Lerman, Antony (4 September 2018b). "Labour should ditch the IHRA working definition of antisemitism altogether". openDemocracy.
- Lerman, Antony (22 March 2019a). "The Labour Party, 'institutional antisemitism' and irresponsible politics". openDemocracy.
- Lewis, Clive (24 July 2019). "I know that Labour can rid itself of antisemitism – here's how". The Independent.
- Mason, Rowena (17 August 2015). "Jeremy Corbyn says antisemitism claims 'ludicrous and wrong'". The Guardian.
- Mendick, Robert (20 May 2017). "Jeremy Corbyn's 10-year association with group which denies the Holocaust". The Telegraph.
- Patrikarakos, David (30 August 2018). "British Jews' Corbyn problem". Politico.
- Prince, Rosa (2016). Comrade Corbyn – Updated Edition. Biteback Publishing. ISBN 978-1-785-90004-4.
- Rich, Dave (2018). The Left's Jewish Problem: Jeremy Corbyn, Israel and Anti-Semitism. Biteback Publishing. ISBN 978-1-785-90428-8.
- Robertson, Geoffrey (31 August 2018). "IHRA definition of antisemitism is not fit for purpose". Doughty Street. Archived from the original on 1 September 2018.
- Sanz, Maria Jesús Pinar (2012). "Ethnic Hunmour and Political Advertising". In Chovanec, Jan; Ermida, Isabel (eds.). Language and Humour in the Media. Cambridge Scholars Publishing. pp. 211–229. ISBN 978-1-443-83938-9.
- Seaton, Matt (18 August 2018). "Behind the Anti-Semitism Crisis of Jeremy Corbyn's Labour Party". NYR Daily.
- Seddon, Mark; Beckett, Francis (2018). Jeremy Corbyn and the Strange Rebirth of Labour England. Biteback Publishing. ISBN 978-1-785-90423-3.
- Sedley, Stephen; Janner-Klausner, Laura; Bindman, Geoffrey; Rose, Jacqueline; Kahn-Harris, Keith (27 July 2018). "How should antisemitism be defined?". The Guardian.
- Seymour, Richard (2017). Corbyn: The Strange Rebirth of Radical Politics. Verso Books. ISBN 978-1-786-63299-9.
- Seymour, Richard (6 April 2018). "Labour's Antisemitism Affair". Jacobin.
- Staetsky, L. Daniel (12 September 2017). Antisemitism in contemporary Great Britain: A study of attitudes towards Jews and Israel (PDF). Institute for Jewish Policy Research. pp. 1–82.
- Stern-Weiner, Jamie; Finkelstein, Norman (3 May 2016). "The American Jewish scholar behind Labour's 'antisemitism' scandal breaks his silence". openDemocracy. Archived from the original on 3 May 2016.
- Sugarman, Daniel (27 June 2017). "Making Chakrabarti a peer was Corbyn's sign of contempt for Jews, says Howard Jacobson". The Jewish Chronicle.
- Sugarman, Daniel (13 September 2018). "More than 85 per cent of British Jews think Jeremy Corbyn is antisemitic". The Jewish Chronicle.
- Tempest, Matthew (28 January 2005). "Labour denies new election poster is anti-semitic". The Guardian.
- Tran, Mark (17 February 2016). "Labour opens inquiry into antisemitism allegations at Oxford student club". The Guardian.
- White, Michael (6 May 2003). "Dalyell steps up attack on Levy". The Guardian.
- Wistrich, Robert S. (2012). From Ambivalence to Betrayal: The Left, the Jews, and Israel. University of Nebraska Press/Vidal Sassoon International Center for the Study of Antisemitism. ISBN 978-0-803-24083-4.
