= When Pigs Fly Bakery =

American company

- Type: Bakery
- Founded: March 1993
- Founder: Ron Siegel
- Headquarters: York, Maine, United States
- Area served: United States
- Key people: Grant Broom (CEO); James Broom (president)
- Website: sendbread.com

When Pigs Fly Bakery is an American manufacturer of bread products, located in York, Maine. It produces around 25 varieties of bread, sold in supermarkets and its own chain of stores throughout the New England region, as well as online with delivery across the continental United States. When Pigs Fly was founded in 1993 by Ron Siegel, who ran it with his brother Andrew for 29 years. Since 2021, the company has been run by brothers Grant and James Broom as CEO and president, respectively.

== History ==
When Pigs Fly Bakery was started by Ron Siegel, a former restaurateur, in Wells, Maine, in March 1993. At the time, there were no local bakeries, and Siegel saw a business opportunity. He took the name from the adynaton "when pigs fly;" Siegel's daughter had a poster that contained the phrase, and Siegel's family told him that pigs would fly before he made a successful career baking bread. Siegel's father loaned him US$5,000 for a dough mixer, and he worked 17 to 20 hours a day. On its opening day, When Pigs Fly produced 83 loaves of bread.

In 1994, Siegel's brother, Andrew, moved from California and joined the company. Andrew began handling When Pig's Fly's business, while Ron managed the bakery. In an interview with Inc., Andrew recalled that he and Ron sometimes worked more than 24 hours straight during When Pigs Fly's early days: "not only mixing, rolling, baking, and packing the bread, but then doing deliveries ourselves when the delivery person would not show up." They hired their first employee in late 1994. Siegel was initially the sole delivery man and brought bread to stores in his 1987 Toyota pickup truck. By 2004, When Pigs Fly had 11 delivery trucks.

By 2017, When Pigs Fly had moved to a larger facility in York, Maine, and was producing 12,000 bread loaves a day with 80 employees. The bakery is 25,000 square feet. The brothers stepped down from daily operations in 2021, hiring Grant and James Broom, brothers from New London, New Hampshire, as CEO and president, respectively. The Brooms had been When Pigs Fly customers since childhood and became acquainted with the Siegels through a private equity firm. The Siegels remain owners. Andrew felt it was fitting that two brothers were taking over the company, noting the Brooms were around the same age as the Siegels when they started When Pigs Fly.

== Products and distribution ==
When Pigs Fly sells about 25 bread varieties, including unconventional varieties such as chocolate, lemonade, spinach ciabatta, and tomato. A selection of their authentic sourdough breads is sold in supermarkets throughout New England, as well as in New York, New Jersey, Texas, and beyond. The company also sells its full selection of products online. As of October 2026, over 800 stores, including Costco, Hannaford, Market Basket, Shaw's, and Whole Foods Market, carry When Pigs Fly products. When Pigs Fly also operates its own chain of stores, with two locations in the Greater Boston area (in Lexington and Somerville) and its flagship company store in Kittery, Maine. The Kittery location resides alongside a restaurant that primarily produces pizza.

== See also ==
- List of bakeries
