= Chakrabarti Inquiry =

2016 investigation of the UK Labour Party

- Date: Inquiry, 29 April 2016; Report, 30 June 2016
- Location: London, England
- Theme: Racism in the Labour Party
- Cause: Suspension of Labour Party members amid allegations of antisemitism
- Organised by: Labour Party
- Participants: Shami Chakrabarti
- Outcome: Publication of Chakrabarti Report

The Chakrabarti Inquiry was a 2016 investigation into allegations of antisemitism and other forms of racism in the United Kingdom's Labour Party. Chaired by barrister Shami Chakrabarti, the inquiry was launched following comments made by two prominent Labour figures, Naz Shah and Ken Livingstone, that some asserted were antisemitic in nature; Shah, a member of Parliament, and Livingstone, the former mayor of London, were subsequently suspended from the party pending an investigation.

The inquiry presented its findings on 30 June 2016, stating that although antisemitism and other types of racism were not endemic within the Labour Party, there was an "occasionally toxic atmosphere".

== Background ==
The inquiry was established by Labour Party leader Jeremy Corbyn on 29 April 2016, following the suspension of Naz Shah, the Labour MP for Bradford West, and Ken Livingstone, the former mayor of London. The suspensions came after media reports revealed that Shah had shared a graphic on Twitter in 2014 suggesting that Israel should be relocated to the United States. Livingstone defended Shah during a radio interview, stating, "When Hitler won his election in 1932 his policy then was that Jews should be moved to Israel. He was supporting Zionism before he went mad and ended up killing six million Jews." Both were suspended pending an investigation into their conduct.

Announcing the inquiry, Corbyn emphasized Labour’s commitment to combating racism, stating, "Labour is an anti-racist party to its core and has a long and proud history of standing against racism, including antisemitism." He appointed Shami Chakrabarti, former head of Liberty, to chair the investigation. The inquiry's mandate was to provide recommendations on addressing racism within the party, including antisemitism and Islamophobia. Chakrabarti engaged with affected communities and aimed to deliver guidelines on acceptable behavior and language within two months.

On 16 May 2016, Chakrabarti announced she had joined the Labour Party to build trust and confidence among its members, while maintaining that her independence would not be compromised. The inquiry had two deputy chairs: Jan Royall, who was at the time holding an investigation into antisemitism at Oxford University Labour Club, and director of the Pears Institute for the Study of Antisemitism David Feldman.

The controversy unfolded at a critical time for Labour, as the party was preparing for the May 2016 local elections and facing internal divisions over Corbyn's leadership.

== Findings and recommendations ==
The inquiry's findings were published at a Labour Party event on 30 June 2016. The report included 20 recommendations for addressing racism within the party, including:

- Abusive language targeting individuals or groups based on physical characteristics, racial or religious tropes, or stereotypes should be excluded from Labour Party discourse. This includes terms such as "Zio" and "Paki."
- Members should avoid the use of Hitler, Nazi, and Holocaust metaphors, distortions, and comparisons, particularly in discussions about Israel and Palestine.
- Procedural rule changes should be implemented to enhance the party's disciplinary process, including the adoption and publication of a formal complaints procedure.
- A general counsel should be appointed to advise on disciplinary matters and manage external legal counsel.
- The party should work to increase the ethnic diversity of its staff.

The report rejected the idea of a lifetime ban for members using racist language and advised against retrospective action for comments made prior to the inquiry. It concluded that the Labour Party "is not overrun by anti-Semitism, Islamophobia, or other forms of racism" but acknowledged an "occasionally toxic atmosphere" and "too much clear evidence [of] ignorant attitudes."

Reactions to the report included calls for its full implementation. Chief Rabbi Ephraim Mirvis urged a "full and unhesitating implementation of [its] findings". Writing in The Guardian, Keith Kahn-Harris suggested that Chakrabarti had "delivered a report that, while not the last word on the subject, does at least deserve to be discussed seriously and calmly". David Feldman stated: "This is an important document at a time, when more than ever, we need to stand firm against all forms of racism and intolerance. The report marks a positive step towards ensuring that the Labour Party is a welcoming place for all minority groups. It recommends steps to ensure that members act in a spirit of tolerance and respect, while maintaining principles of free speech and open debate. The recommendations are constructive and provide a sound basis on which the Party can move forward."

== Launch ==
=== Smeeth-Wadsworth controversy ===
The launch of the Chakrabarti Report was overshadowed by an incident involving Labour MP Ruth Smeeth, who is Jewish. During the event, audience member Marc Wadsworth, representing a group called Momentum Black Connexions, accused Smeeth of working "hand-in-hand" with The Daily Telegraph and with right-wing media in general after observing her talking to the paper’s reporter, Kate McCann, and exchanging his press release. The press release called for the deselection of Labour "traitors."

Smeeth criticized Jeremy Corbyn for not defending her during the incident, stating: "It is beyond belief that someone could come to the launch of a report on antisemitism in the Labour Party and espouse such vile conspiracy theories about Jewish people, which were ironically highlighted as such in Ms Chakrabarti's report, while the leader of my own party stood by and did absolutely nothing... a Labour Party under his stewardship cannot be a safe space for British Jews."

Smeeth wrote to the Labour Party’s general secretary and the chair of the Parliamentary Labour Party to file a formal complaint about the incident. Chakrabarti later stated that she had admonished Wadsworth for his comments, an action she said Corbyn had supported. She also apologized to Smeeth.

Wadsworth denied knowing that Smeeth was Jewish. He was subsequently expelled from the Labour Party.

=== Corbyn comments ===
At the launch of the Chakrabarti Inquiry findings, Jeremy Corbyn expressed his support for the "immediate implementation" of the report's recommendations. While discussing the report, Corbyn stated: "Our Jewish friends are no more responsible for the actions of Israel or the Netanyahu government than our Muslim friends are for those various self-styled Islamic states or organisations."

Chief Rabbi Ephraim Mirvis described the comments as "offensive" and suggested they would likely increase concerns within the Jewish community. A spokesperson for Corbyn later clarified that he "was explicitly stating that people should not be held responsible for the actions of states or organisations around the world on the basis of religion or ethnicity."

Shami Chakrabarti defended Corbyn, explaining to LBC that she had reviewed his speech before the event and believed it accurately reflected the findings of her report. She noted: "His point was: when you have Jewish neighbours or friends, or Muslim neighbours or friends and something bad happens in the world, don't ask them to be the first to explain or defend or condemn."

== Aftermath ==
Jeremy Corbyn appointed Chakrabarti to the House of Lords in July 2016. In October 2016, she was appointed to the Corbyn shadow cabinet as Shadow Attorney General for England and Wales. Following her appointment, Labour MPs Tom Watson and Wes Streeting along with some Jewish groups, questioned the credibility of the Chakrabarti Inquiry’s findings. A spokesperson for Corbyn described Chakrabarti as "an ideal appointment to the Lords."

Later that year, a cross-party Home Affairs Select Committee inquiry into antisemitism in the UK later that year invited Corbyn, Chakrabati and Livingstone, amongst others, to provide evidence in a broader investigation into antisemitism. The Select Committee’s report criticized the Chakrabarti Inquiry as "ultimately compromised" by Chakrabarti’s subsequent acceptance of a peerage and Shadow Cabinet position. The Committee further stated that Chakrabarti had been "insufficiently open" in her responses regarding when she was offered the peerage.

Corbyn defended Chakrabarti, arguing that the criticism of her independence was unfair. He stated that her appointments were made after the inquiry's completion and based on her legal and campaigning expertise. Corbyn also accused the Select Committee of "political framing" and placing undue emphasis on the Labour Party in its investigation.
