= Snowball clause =

Snowball clause may refer to:

- Snowball clause, about an idiom of improbability
- Snowball clause, a term used in deletion of articles on Wikipedia
