= List of Cardiff School of Journalism, Media and Culture people =

List of notable alumni and faculty of the Cardiff School of Journalism, Media and Cultural Studies.

== Alumni ==
Name	Course	Graduated	Known for
Adrian Chiles	PgDip	1992	Broadcaster and writer
Alan Johnston	PgDip	1987	BBC Journalist
Anna Botting		1991	Sky News presenter
Ben Brown			BBC News Presenter
Claire Marshall	PgDip	1997	BBC Journalist
Craig Oliver	PgDip	1992	Former Conservative Party Communications Director and editor of BBC News at 6 and News at 10
Damian Grammaticas	PgDip	1994	BBC Europe Correspondent
Ellie Price	PgDip	2006	BBC Broadcaster
Emma Barnett	PgDip	2006	BBC Broadcaster, host of the Emma Barnett Show on Radio 5 Live, Woman's Hour, and Newsnight
Emma Catherine Crosby	PgDip	1999	Channel 5, Sky News, ITV and BBC News newsreader
Gaby Hinsliff	PgDip	1993	The Guardian columnist & writer
Geraint Vincent			Correspondent, ITV News
Guto Harri	PgDip	1988	VP Hanover Communications, former BBC Chief Political Correspondent, Communications Director for the Mayor of London
Hattie Brett	PgDip	2005	Editor-at-Large of Grazia UK
Huw Edwards	BA	1983	Anchor, BBC News at Six and BBC News at Ten
Iain Canning	BA	2000	Film producer known for The King's Speech
James Goldston	PgDip	1991	President of ABC News
Jason Mohammad	PgDip	1997	Journalist and broadcaster
Jenny Hill			BBC Berlin Correspondent
John Witherow	PgDip	1977	Editor of The Times
Julia Hartley-Brewer	PgDip		talkRADIO Breakfast Show presenter
Kevin Maguire	PgDip	1984	Daily Mirror associate editor
Laura Trevelyan	PgDip	1991	BBC World News America anchor
Manish Bhasin	PgDip	1998	Presenter of The Football League Show and of Premier League Productions shows
Martin Lewis	PgDip	1998	Journalist and presenter
Matt Barbet	BA (1994), PGDip	1999	Former host of 5 News Tonight, BBC Breakfast, BBC London News, and newsreader on BBC Radio
Matt Dickinson	PgDip	1991	Chief football correspondent at The Times
Matthew Tempest	PgDip	1997	Der Spiegel journalist
Max Foster	BSc	1994	CNN anchor and correspondent
Oliver Holt			Chief Sports Writer, The Mail on Sunday
Peter Gwynne Morgan			Television and film writer/producer
Polly Evans	PgDip	1999	Former BBC Anchor & Correspondent
Rajesh Mirchandani	PgDip	1992	Chief Communications Officer, UN Foundation, former BBC correspondent
Riz Khan	BSc, PgDip		Former host at Al Jazeera English, CNN International and BBC World
Sean Fletcher	PgDip		Good Morning Britain co-host, host of BBC Countryfile and Sunday Morning Live
Siân Lloyd	BA	1979	Television presenter and meteorologist
Susanna Reid	PgDip	1993	Good Morning Britain co-host
Tim Hetherington	BA	1996	Photojournalist, Academy Award nominated film director
Tom Symonds	PgDip	1992	BBC Home Affairs Correspondent

== Faculty ==
=== Current ===
- Matt Walsh (Head of School)
- Prof Stuart Allan (Professor of Journalism and Communication)
- Prof Richard Tait (Professor of Journalism)
- Prof Karin Wahl-Jorgensen (Professor of Journalism)
- Prof Stephen Cushion (Professor of Journalism)

=== Former ===
- Prof Richard Sambrook (Emeritus Professor)
- John Hartley
- Ian Hargreaves (Emeritus Professor)
