= List of idioms of improbability =

There are many common idioms of improbability, or adynata, used to denote that a given event is impossible or extremely unlikely to occur.

== In English ==
=== Events that can never happen ===
- As a response to an unlikely proposition, "when pigs fly", "when pigs have wings", or simply "pigs might fly".
- "When Hell freezes over" and "A cold day in Hell" are based on the understanding that Hell is eternally an extremely hot place.
- The "Twelfth of Never" will never come to pass. (Note: A song of the same name was recorded by Johnny Mathis in 1956.)
- "On Tibb's Eve" refers to the saint's day of a saint who never existed.
- "When two Sundays come together"
- "If the sky falls, we shall catch larks" means that it is pointless to worry about things that will never happen.
- "On the thirtieth of February", impossible in the Gregorian or Julian calendar, although it did occur in the Swedish calendar of 1712.

=== Events that rarely or might never happen ===
- "Once in a blue moon" refers to a rare event.
- "Don't hold your breath" implies that if you hold your breath while waiting for a particular thing to happen, you will die first.
- Having to wait for something "until the cows come home"

=== Tasks that are difficult or impossible to perform ===
- To have "a snowball's chance in Hell".
- "Like getting blood from a stone", and "like squeezing water from a stone".
- "Like finding a needle in a haystack"
- "Like herding cats"
- "Squaring a circle"

=== Things that are impossible to find ===
- "As rare as hen's teeth".
- "As rare as rocking-horse poo".

== In other languages ==
- Afrikaans – as die perde horings kry ("when horses grow horns")
- Albanian – ne 36 gusht ("on the thirty-sixth of August")
- Arabic has a wide range of idioms differing from one region to another. In some Arab countries of the Persian Gulf, one would say إذا حجت البقرة على قرونها idha ḥajjit il-bagara `ala gurunha ("when the cow goes on pilgrimage on its horns"). In Egypt, one says في المشمش fil-mishmish ("when the apricots bloom"). Other Arab people, mainly Palestinian, use the expression لما ينور الملح lemma ynawwar il-malḥ, which roughly translates into "when salt blossoms" or "when salt flowers" In Gulf or Khaleeji Arabic is the expression يوم الديك يبيض or "when the rooster lays an egg".
- Breton – Pa nijo ar moc'h ("when pigs fly")
- Bulgarian – the three most common phrases are: когато цъфнат налъмите ("when the pattens bloom"), на Върба в сряда/петък ("when Flower’s Day falls on a Wednesday/Friday"; Flower's Day is always on a Sunday) and на куково лято ("in a Kukeri's summer"; Kukeri is a winter custom). A related phrase, [ще видиш] през крив макарон ("[you'll see] through a crooked noodle") has a similar meaning, usually used as a threat to have a privilege taken away.
- Chinese – 太陽從西邊升起 ("when the sun rises in the West")
- Czech – až naprší a uschne, "When it rains and dries". Another expression is až opadá listí z dubu ("When the leaves fall from the oak"). Another is na svatého Dyndy ("on Saint Dyndy's Day"), Dyndy being a fictional saint whose name rhymes with jindy ("other [time]") or with nikdy ("never").
- Danish – når der er to torsdage i én uge ("when there are two Thursdays in one week")
- Dutch – met Sint-juttemis, or als Pinksteren en Pasen op één dag vallen ("when Pentecost and Easter are on the same day")
- Esperanto – je la tago de Sankta Neniamo ("on Saint Never's Day") — a loan-translation from German (see below).
- Finnish – sitten kun lehmät lentävät - when the cows fly. Also jos lehmällä olisi siivet, se lentäisi (if a cow had wings, it would fly), implying futile speculations. Also kun lipputanko kukkii ("when flagpole blossoms") and Tuohikuussa Pukin-päivän aikaan ("in Barkember on St. Buck's day", implying an imaginary month and imaginary day). Sometimes also kun Helvetti jäätyy ("when Hell freezes over"), although saying it aloud to someone is considered very rude and hostile.
- French – à la Saint-Glinglin (on Saint Glinglin's day). Glinglin is a nonsense rhyme for the French word saint. A couple of other expressions are quand les poules auront des dents ("when hens have teeth") and quand les coqs pondront des œufs ("when roosters lay eggs"). An expression, today falling into disuse, is la semaine des quatre jeudis ("the week of the four Thursdays"), as in "that will happen (or not) during the week of the four Thursdays" (Thursday was the break in the school week). The expression aux calendes grecques ("to the Greek Calends") was also used for indefinite postponement, derived from the ancient Latin expression (see below). To express logical impossibility: si ma tante en avait, on l'appellerait mon oncle ("if my aunt had any she would be called my uncle"). What she would have is left to the imagination, and it is probably a parallel creation rather than a borrowing to or from Marathi (see below). To express someone's wishful thinking: Il attend que les alouettes lui tombent toutes cuites dans la bouche ("He's waiting for larks to fall into his mouth all cooked").
- German – Wenn Schweine fliegen können! is identical to the English saying "when pigs fly", although the older proverb Wenn Schweine Flügel hätten, wäre alles möglich ("if pigs had wings, everything would be possible") is in more common use, often modified on the second part to something impossible, like "if pigs had wings, even your idea might work". Another phrase is Am Sankt-Nimmerleins-Tag ("on St. Never's Day"). Wenn Weihnachten und Ostern auf einen Tag fallen! ("when Christmas and Easter are on the same day")
- Georgian – როცა ვირი ხეზე ავა ("when the donkey climbs the tree")
- Greek – του Αγίου Ποτέ ("on St. Never's [Day]") is sometimes used, although some people may prefer the profane Του Αγίου Πούτσου ανήμερα ("right on the Day of St. Dick's"). One might also say that an unlikely event will happen "on the 32nd of the month". To express indefinite postponement, you might say that an event is deferred "to the [Greek] Calends" (see Latin). A less common expression used to point out someone's wishful thinking is Αν η γιαγιά μου είχε καρούλια, θα ήταν πατίνι ("If my grandmother had wheels she would be a skateboard").
- Hebrew – כשיצמחו שיערות על כף ידי ("when hair grows on the palm of my hand"). Another is a legal term, referring to the indefinite postponing of a case, "until Elijah comes".
- Hindi – सूरज पश्चिम से उगा है ("sun has risen from the west") and बिन मौसम की बरसात ("when it rains when it's not the season to rain"). The latter is also used to denote something unexpected/untimely as much as improbable.
- Hungarian – The two most often used expressions are majd ha piros hó esik ("when red snow falls"), and majd ha cigánygyerekek potyognak az égből ("When gypsy children are streaming from the sky"). There is a third, uncommonly used phrase: majd ha fagy ("When it freezes"), the short version of majd ha a pokol befagy ("When hell freezes over"). A couple of other expressions are holnapután kiskedden ("on the less holy Tuesday after tomorrow") and soha napján (on the day of never).
- Italian – quando gli asini voleranno ("when donkeys will fly"), il 31 febbraio ("the 31st of February"), il giorno di "mai" ed il mese di "poi" ("the "never" day and the "then" month"), dopodomai ("the day after nevermorrow") and, similarly to Latin, alle Calende greche ("to the Greek Kalends"). To imply futile speculations, common expressions are se mia nonna avesse le ruote, sarebbe una carriola ("if my grandma had wheels, she'd be a wheelbarrow") or se mio nonno avesse avuto tre palle, sarebbe stato un flipper ("if my grandpa had three balls, he would have been a pinball machine").
- Japanese – 網の目に風とまらず (ami no me ni kaze tomarazu) lit."You can't catch wind in a net." Another idiom of improbability is 畑に蛤 (Hata ni hamaguri) which means "finding clams in a field".
- Latin – ad kalendas graecas ("to the Greek Kalends") signified indefinite postponement, since the Greek calendar had no Calends period; also cum mula peperit = "when a mule foaled".
- Korean – 해가 서쪽에서 뜨겠다 (haega seojjogeseo teugeta) means "the sun might rise from the West", commonly used as a response to a news that something improbable happened.
- Lombard (Milanese dialect) – quand pìssen i òch ("when the geese will piss"), refers to the fact that geese do not urinate.
- Malay – menunggu kucing bertanduk ("to wait until a horned cat walks by")
- Malayalam – കാക്ക മലർന്നു പറക്കും (kākka malarnnu paṟakkuṃ), "[the] crow will fly upside down"
- Marathi – आत्याबाईं ना मिश्या असत्या तर काका म्हंटले असते (Ãtyābāiḥ nā mishyā asatyā tar kākã mhaṭalā asatā), "if aunt [here: father's sister] grows moustaches she would be called uncle"
- Norwegian – når helvete fryser til is (Bokmål) or når helvete frys til is (Nynorsk); "when Hell freezes over", lit. "when Hell freezes to ice")
- Persian – وقت گل نی (vaght e gol e ney), "when the reed plant blossoms"
- Piedmontese (Turin dialect) – smana dij tre giòbia (the "week with three Thursdays").
- Polish – na święty Nigdy ("till St. Never's Day"); zobaczysz... jak świnia niebo ("you'll see [something] like a pig will see the sky") – refers to the pigs' anatomical inability to raise their head and look at the sky; prędzej mi kaktus na dłoni wyrośnie ("sooner will a cactus grow on my palm"); (pulling down the lower eyelid of an eye) Jedzie mi tu pociąg? ("Is a train running here on me?").
- Portuguese – no dia de São Nunca ("on Saint Never's day"), nem que a vaca tussa ("not even if the cow coughs"), quando os porcos voarem ("when pigs fly") and quando as galinhas tiverem dentes ("when chickens have teeth"). In Brazilian Portuguese, especially in the historical context of World War II, quando cobra fumar ("when a snake smokes"), which has since reversed meaning, given the participation of Brazil in the war.
- Romanian – la Paștele cailor/la Ispas ("on the horses' Easter/on Ascension day"), când o face plopul pere și răchita micșunele ("when poplars would grow pears and willows wallflowers"), la Sfântul Așteaptă ("on Saint Wait's Day"), când va zbura porcul ("when pigs fly"), and la pulivară (vulgar "during the summer of cocks").
- Russian – когда рак на горе свистнет (kogdá rak na goré svístnet), "when the crawfish whistles on the mountain". После дождичка в четверг (posle dojdichka v chetverg), literally "after the rain on Thursday" yet meaning never. Не видать как своих ушей (ne vidat kak svoih ushey), "not to see [something] like your ears".
- Scottish Gaelic – pàillean am fàsach, "a palace in a wilderness"
- Serbo-Croatian – кад на врби роди грожђе (kad na vrbi rodi grožđe), "when willow bears grapes". Another variant is кад на врби засврби (kad na vrbi zasvrbi), "when willow get itchy". Note rhyme in vrbi zasvrbi. Мало сутра (malo sutra), literally "a little bit tomorrow", has a similar meaning as "all my eye".
- Seychellois Creole, also known as Kreol or Seselwa – lannen de mil zanmen is used, which means "year two thousand and never". It is a fairly new expression used mainly among the youth.
- Slovene – Ob svetem Nikoli is a wordplay that literally means "on St. Nicholas' feast day". The word nikoli, when stressed on the second syllable, means "never", when stressed on the first it is the locative case of Nikola, i.e. Nicholas.
- Spanish – cuando las vacas vuelen ("when cows fly") or cuando los cerdos vuelen ("when pigs fly"). Its most common use is in response to an affirmative statement, for example "I saw Mrs. Smith exercising, I swear!" to which the response given would be something like, "Yeah right, and cows fly". Other variations slightly fallen into disuse include cuando las ranas crien pelo ("when frogs grow hair") and cuando San Juan agache el dedo ("when Saint John bends his finger"). The latter is a reference to the common depiction of St. John with one or two extended fingers.
- Tagalog – kapag namuti ang uwak, kapag nangitim ang tagak ("when the crow turns white, when the egret turns black"). There is euphony between the nouns uwak and tagak.
- Turkish – balık kavağa çıktığında ("when the fish climbs the poplar tree"). Another one is çıkmaz ayın son Çarşambasında ("at the last Wednesday of the endless month"). A very popular one is Eşek sudan gelince (When a donkey comes ashore from the sea)
- Ukrainian – коли рак на горі свисне (koly rak no hori svysne), "when the crawfish whistles on the mountain"; or a longer variant коли рак на горі свисне, а риба заспіває (koly rak no hori svysne, a ryba zaspivaye), "when the crawfish whistles on the mountain and fish sings". Other expressions are: не бачити тобі ... як своїх вух ("you'll never see [something] like you will never see your ears"); на кінський Великдень ("on horse's Easter"); побачиш як власну потилицю ("you'll see it like your own nape").
- Welsh – tan ddydd Sul y pys ("till Peas Sunday", a nonsensical date) and pan fydd yr Wyddfa'n gaws ("when Snowdon is made of cheese"). More modern additions include pan fydd moch yn hedfan ("when pigs fly"), pan fydd uffern yn rhewi drosodd ("when hell freezes over") and pan fydd 'Dolig yn yr haf, a gwsberis yn y gaeaf ("when Christmas will be in the summer and goosberries in winter"). Rare events meaning "once in a blue moon" include: unwaith yn y pedwar amser ("once in the four seasons") and unwaith yn y pedwar gwynt ("once in the four winds").

== See also ==
- Black swan theory, a term labelling unexpected, rare events
