= Maria X =

Greek cultural practitioner

Maria Chatzichristodoulou
- Born: Maria Chatzichristodoulou; 1974 (age 51–52); Greece
- Other name: Maria X
- Education: University of Patras
- Occupations: Cultural practitioner, curator, producer, painter, performer, writer, community organizer
- Employer: University of Hull

Maria Chatzichristodoulou (born 1974), also known as Maria X, is a Greek cultural practitioner who has served as a curator, producer, painter, performer, writer, and community organizer.

== Education ==
She received her undergraduate degree in Theater Studies from the University of Patras, Greece, graduating with first class honors.

== Career ==
Chatzichristodoulou has been influential in directing innovative performances and festivals. In 1998, while working at the Fournos Centre for Art & New Technologies, she co-founded the first Hellenic Arts & Technology Festival. The festival gained international acclaim under her direction in partnership with Manthos and Dodo Santorineos. Her term as co-director of both the Fournos Centre and Hellenic Arts & Technology Festival lasted until 2002. She has played a role in directing numerous other performances, workshops, and events, including "Intimacy: Across Digital and Visceral Performance" and the Thursday Club Series at the University of Hull.

She has published widely and is a frequent presenter at conferences on technology, performance, and new media. She currently sits on the editorial board of the Body, Space & Technology online journal.

In 2009, she joined the School of Arts and New Media at the University of Hull Scarborough Campus where she currently serves as the Director of Postgraduate Studies and Lecturer in Theater and Performance.

== Awards and recognition ==
Chatzichristodoulou has won three teaching awards for her courses focusing mainly on theater, performance, and interdisciplinary modules. She earned her PhD in 2010 in Art and Computational Technologies from Goldsmiths, University of London with her dissertation entitled, "Cybertheatres: Emergent Networked Performance Practices."

== Selected publications ==
- With Rachel Zerihan. (Eds) 2012. Intimacy Across Visceral and Digital Performance. London: Palgrave Macmillan.
- 'Presence, Pattern, and the Original Body in Networked Encounters' In Sunden, J. and Hughes, R. (Eds) 2011. Second Nature: Origins and Originality in Art, Science and New Media. Stockholm: Axl Books, pp 99–122.
