= Macpherson principle =

Anti-discrimination principle

The Macpherson principle is an anti-discrimination principle, originating in the 1999 Macpherson Report by judge Sir William Macpherson into the 1993 racist murder of Stephen Lawrence, a British black teenager. In the report, Macpherson offered as a principle that all complaints about incidents of racism should be recorded and investigated as such, when they are perceived by the complainant or someone else as acts of racism. It was first articulated in the Macpherson Report of 1999.

The principle does not state that all such incidents are in fact racist. It only states that they should be recorded and investigated as (possible) racist incidents, in order that numbers of crimes and incidents in which racism played a part, or were felt to have played a part, should not be understated and forgotten in official records.

The term came to use initially in the UK, in considering police handling of complaints and crime reports by black people, since that was the context of the Macpherson report, and again came to be cited in the 2017-2020 controversy over the Labour Party's handling of antisemitic conduct and complaints.
