= David Feldman (historian) =

British historian

David Feldman FRHistS is a professor at Birkbeck College, University of London. Feldman is director of the Birkbeck Institute for the study of Antisemitism. His research relates to the history of minorities and their place in British society from 1600 to the current time. He is an editor of History Workshop Journal.

== Academic career ==
Feldman joined Birkbeck in 1994 and previously held lectureships at Christ's College, Cambridge and the University of Bristol. He is a fellow of the Royal Historical Society and a member of the Association for Jewish Studies.

== Selected publications ==
- Integration, Disadvantage and Extremism, Pears Institute/COMPAS, 2014. (co-edited with B. Gidley)
- Post-war Reconstruction in Europe: International Perspectives 1945–1949 Past and Present Supplement, 6, 2011, Oxford University Press. (co-edited with M. Mazower and J. Reinisch)
- Structures and Transformations in British History, Cambridge University Press, January 2011. (co-edited with J. Lawrence)
- Paths of Integration: Migrants in Western Europe (1880–2004), University of Amsterdam Press, 2006. (co-edited with L. Lucassen and J. Oltmer)
- Jewish Workers in the Modern Diaspora, University of California Press, 1998. (co-edited with Nancy Green and others)
- *Englishmen and Jews: Social Relations and Political Culture, 1840–1914, Yale University Press, 1994.
- Metropolis London: Histories and Representations since 1800, Routledge, 1989. (co-edited with G. Stedman Jones)
