= Manthos Santorineos =

Greek writer and author

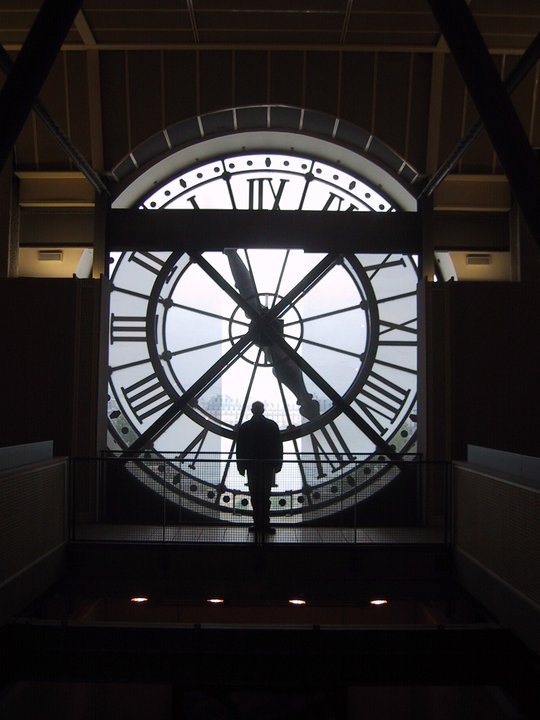
Manthos Santorineos

Manthos Santorineos (Greek: Μάνθος Σαντοριναίος) is a Greek promoter of the arts, author and film director. Since 1984, he has been active in promoting art and technology. He established the Department of Art and Technology at the Ileana Tounda Centre (1987), the Fournos Center for Digital Culture (1991) and the Mediaterra Festival (1998).

Since 2000, he has been responsible for the multimedia/hypermedia lab in the pre-graduate course in Athens School of Fine Arts. In 2012 he became Scientific co-director of Greek – French Masters Course Art, Virtual Reality and Multi-User Systems of Artistic Expression at the Athens School of Fine Arts - Paris-8 University.

He directed films and television programs (1985–1995). He works focus on video art, interactive installations, net-based projects and virtual reality and were shown at festivals and museums in Greece and abroad.

He is the author of De la civilisation du papier à la civilisation du numérique (From Paper to Digital Civilisation, L'Harmattan, Paris, 2007) and edited Gaming Realities (Fournos Center, Athens, 2006).

== Publications ==
=== Journals ===
- Digital Spaces – Illusionistic Environments, Manthos Santorineos, Emmanouela, Vogiatzaki – Krukowski, Internet Journal Body, Space and Technology (BST), (2011)
- The Museum and the digital culture. A special case: The Byzantine and Christian Museum”, Manthos Santorineos, 2007 Ilissia magazine, Autumn 2007.n.1
- Espace virtuel d’expérimentations artistiques et ludique non verbales, Manthos Santorineos, Nefeli Dimitriadi, Arts et technologies de l’image, Revue No 3 Décembre 2007, Université Paris 8
- Leonardo journal, Volume 38, Number 3, June 2005 pp. 202–206
- Mouchette, Santorineos, Manthos, Sant, Toni. Rape, Murder and Suicide Are Easier When You Use a Keyboard Shortcut: Mouchette, an On-Line Virtual Character

=== Books ===
- "De la civilisation du papier a la civilisation du numérique: A travers les aventures de l'enregistrement de la recherche, de la pensée et de l'Art". www.editions-harmattan.fr (in French). 2007.
- Santorineos, Manthos (2006-01-01). Gaming Realities. A challenge for digital culture / editor.
