= Pears Institute for the Study of Antisemitism =

British research institute

The Pears Institute for the Study of Antisemitism was launched in 2010 as a centre for research, teaching, and public policy formation relating to antisemitism and racial intolerance.

The institute is based at Birkbeck, University of London, and was established by the Pears Foundation. Its director is David Feldman.
