= Matthew Tempest =

British journalist

Matthew Tempest is a British journalist and documentary film-maker now living in Berlin, as editor of EUobserver.com after postings in Paris for AFP, and in Brussels covering Brexit. He was formerly a political correspondent TheGuardian.com, which he joined in 2001 as the paper's first online Westminster reporter, pioneering live-blogging of PMQs and the 2001 general election, and interviewed Noam Chomsky and Harold Pinter.

While studying English at University College, London, he was a contemporary at UCL Film Society with Christopher Nolan.

In 2004 he worked in Berlin for Der Spiegel online, courtesy of a grant from the International Journalist Programme (IJP).

Before joining The Guardian he was a parliamentary reporter for the Sunday People after two years at the Daily Mirror and Sunday Mirrorin London, Glasgow and Belfast.

His interests in his writing include architecture, transport, the environment and alternative politics outside mainstream British politics in Westminster, including Greens, socialist factions, social movements and protests.

He is the author the Modern Berlin Map of 20th Century Architecture (Blue Crow Media, 2016), and a contributor to the Time Out Guide to Berlin (2012).
