= When pigs fly =

Figure of speech describing an impossible event

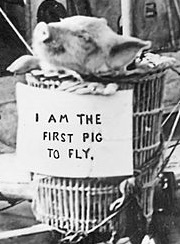
In 1909, English aviator John Moore-Brabazon brought a pig on an airplane flight for the first time ever, to prove as a joke that pigs can in fact fly.

The phrase "when pigs fly" (alternatively, "pigs might fly") is an adynaton—a figure of speech so hyperbolic that it describes an impossibility. The implication of such a phrase is that the circumstances in question (the adynaton, and the circumstances to which the adynaton is being applied) will never occur. The phrase has been used in various forms since the 1600s as a sarcastic remark.

== History ==
The idiom is apparently derived from a centuries-old Scottish proverb, though some other references to pigs flying or pigs with wings are more famous. In his Fourth Book of Gargantua and Pantagruel from 1553, François Rabelais makes the aphorism into a dramatic event, when the giant Pantagruel fights the Chitterlings and its champion, "a huge, fat, thick, grizzly swine, with long and large wings, like those of a windmill."

The phrase appears in the 1865 Alice's Adventures in Wonderland.

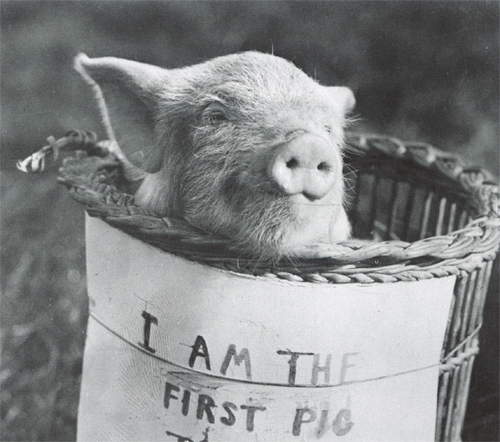
Icarus II, the first flying pig

=== First actual flying pig ===
On November 4, 1909, a six-week-old piglet became the first pig to fly when English aviator John Moore-Brabazon took it for a flight in a Voisin aeroplane. The idea was suggested by a neighbor who thought a flying pig would be funny, and offered a 6-week-old piglet that was soon named "Icarus II" after the famous flying Icarus from Greek myth. The pig was placed in a wastebasket and positioned alongside the engine, and while soaring through the air he "behaved as if he quite realised the importance of the occasion," according to newspaper reports. A radio broadcast that night declared, "In an age when pigs could fly anything might happen!" and headlines proclaimed that the aviator "kills a proverb".

== Meaning ==
"When pigs fly" is an adynaton, a way of saying that something will never happen. The phrase is often used for humorous effect, to scoff at over-ambition. There are numerous variations on the theme; when an individual with a reputation for failure finally succeeds, onlookers may sarcastically claim to see a flying pig. ("Hey look! A flying pig!") Other variations on the phrase include "And pigs will fly", this one in retort to an outlandish statement.

=== Usage ===
At least two appear in the works of Lewis Carroll:

"Thinking again?" the Duchess asked, with another dig of her sharp little chin.
"I've a right to think," said Alice sharply, for she was beginning to feel a little worried.
"Just about as much right," said the Duchess, "as pigs have to fly ..." — Alice's Adventures in Wonderland, Chapter 9.

"The time has come," the Walrus said,
"To talk of many things:
Of shoes—and ships—and sealing-wax—
Of cabbages—and kings—
And why the sea is boiling hot—
And whether pigs have wings." —Through the Looking Glass : and what Alice found there. pp. 75–76.

An example occurs in the film The Eagle Has Landed: an Irish secret agent working for the Nazis replies to a German general speaking of Germany's shortly winning World War II, "Pigs may fly, General, but I doubt it!" Later, when the Irishman sees German soldiers parachuting before an attack, he says to himself, "Mother of God! Flying pigs!"

In the 2012 mobile game Bad Piggies, the third episode is "When Pigs Fly".

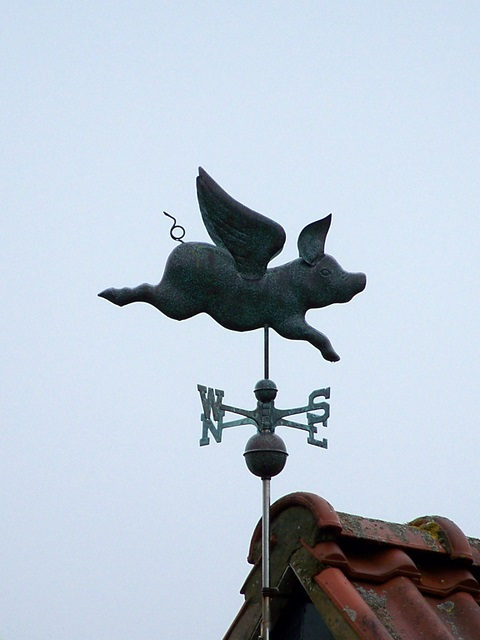
A weather vane in the shape of a flying pig

== Similar phrases ==
- Similar phrases in English include "when hell freezes over" and "monkeys might fly out of my butt", popularized in Wayne's World skits and movies. They are examples of adynata.
- An exact phrase exists in Spanish, Cuando los chanchos vuelen, literally meaning "when pigs fly".
- An identical phrase, used to express impossibilities, exists in Romanian, Când o zbura porcul, literally meaning "When the pig shall fly"; an equivalent also implying an animal is La Paștele cailor, literally: "on horses' Easter".
- The Latin expression ad kalendas graecas "to the Greek calends"
- The German "Wenn Schweine fliegen können!" is identical with the English saying, although the older proverb "Wenn Schweine Flügel hätten, wäre alles möglich" ("if pigs had wings, everything would be possible") is in more common use.
- In Finnish, the expression "kun lehmät lentävät" (when cows fly) is used because of its alliteration.
- In Swedish, the phrase "när grisar flyger" is identical to the English saying.
- In French, the most common expression is "quand les poules auront des dents" (when the hens have teeth).
- In Russian, a popular expression with a similar meaning is "когда рак на горе свистнет" (when the crayfish will whistle on the mountain).
- In medieval Hebrew manuscripts, the expression "until the donkey ascends the ladder" is attested.
- In Arabic, there's an Egyptian proverb "bukra fil mish-mish" (بكرة في المشمش), meaning "tomorrow when the apricots bloom", which pertains to something that will never happen. This is because, in Egypt, apricots (mish-mish) have a very short season and they become mushy quickly.

== Pigasus ==
Pigasus is a portmanteau word combining pig with Pegasus, the winged horse, and used to refer to a pig with wings; it has been used by several different authors.

American literature author John Steinbeck was told by his professor that he would be an author when pigs flew. When he eventually became a novelist, he started to print every book he wrote with the Dog Latin motto "Ad astra per alia porci" (intended to mean 'to the stars on the wings of a pig'). In Latin this is grammatically incorrect because alia means 'other things', while alas would be the accusative form of 'wings' after the preposition per. Steinbeck wrote in a letter that he regarded Pigasus as a symbol of himself, to show he was "earthbound but aspiring [...] not enough wingspread but plenty of intention". He sometimes added an image of a flying pig, called Pigasus.

Pigasus was also a flying pig character in the Oz books written by Ruth Plumly Thompson in the 1930s. Her Pigasus was also a winged pig. His riders gained the gift of poesy, being magically compelled to speak in rhyming jingles while on his back. The character first appeared in Pirates in Oz (1931) and played a major role in the plot of The Wishing Horse of Oz.

Mark Kistler's drawing instruction videos often feature a Pigasus.

== See also ==
- Pigasus (politics)
- Pigs Have Wings
