= Adynaton =

Figure of speech similar to hyperbole

Adynaton (/ˌædɪˈnɑːtɒn, -tən/; plural adynata) is a figure of speech in the form of hyperbole taken to such extreme lengths as to insinuate a complete impossibility:

I will sooner have a beard grow in the palm of my hand than he shall get one on his cheek.

The word derives from the Greek ἀδύνατον (adunaton), neuter of ἀδύνατος (adunatos), "unable, impossible" (a-, "without" + dynasthai, "to be possible or powerful").

== Classical and medieval usage ==
Adynaton was a widespread literary and rhetorical device during the Classical Period. In the Eclogue of Plutarch, there is a long list of proverbs and the first section is titled ΠΕΡΙ ΤΩΝ ΑΔΥΝΑΤΩΝ, consisting of proverbs that are built on adynaton. The adynaton form was often used for vows and covenants, such as in the 16th Epode of Horace, 25-34.

Its plural form (adynata) was translated in Latin as impossibilia. A frequent usage was to refer to one highly unlikely event occurring sooner than another:

One can expect an agreement between philosophers sooner than between clocks.

— Seneca, The Pumpkinification of Claudius

Zenobius's collection of proverbial expressions includes "to count sand" to characterize something impossible or unattainable.

However, it largely fell into disuse during the Middle Ages before undergoing a minor revival in the works of romantic poets, who would boast of the power of their love, and how it could never end.

Together, we shall sooner see, I, & you, The Rhône tarry, & reverse its course, The Saône roil, & return to source, Than this my fire ever die down

— Maurice Scève

== Fiction, folklore and drama ==
Adynata are sometimes used within works of fiction or drama:

Part heat from fire, then, by that notion,
Part frost from snow, wet from the ocean!
Ask less!

— Henrik Ibsen, Brand

Impossible tasks appear often in legends and folklore, and can form elements of ballads, riddles and proverbs. Examples include the tale of "The Spinning-Woman by the Spring",

== Modern usage ==
Some modern adynata include:

- In Bulgarian: когато цъфнат налъмите (kogato tsâfnat nalâmite, "when clogs blossom") and когато върбата роди круши (kogato vârbata rodi krushi, "when pears grow on a willow tree"). koga se pokači svinja s z´´lti čehli na krusa (when the pig in yellow slippers climbs the pear tree)
- in Dutch: Als Pasen en Pinksteren op één dag vallen ("when Easter and Pentecost fall on the same day"); from a poem by Gerrit Komrij: "Eer maakt men lakens wit met inkt (...) dan dat ik (...) zeg wat ik thans lijden moet" ("Bedsheets will be bleached with ink before I speak of my cares"). "Op St. Juttemis" ("On St. Jutmas", i.e. the feast day of a nonexistent saint)
- In Egyptian Arabic: بكرة في المشمش (bukra fil mish-mish, "tomorrow when the apricots bloom")
- In English: When pigs fly!, and Not before Hell freezes over! and its derivative A snowball's chance in hell. When the moon turns to green cheese.
- in Finnish: kun lehmät lentävät ("when cows fly") or kun lipputanko kukkii ("when flagpole blossoms")
- In French: Quand les poules auront des dents ("When hens grow teeth"), La semaine des quatre jeudis ("The week of the four Thursdays") . "À la St. Glinglin" (on the feast day of the nonexistent St. Glinglin); "Aux calendes grecques" (on the Greek Kalendae, which of course only existed on the Roman calendar)
- In German: Wenn Schweine fliegen könnten ("When pigs can fly"); Wenn Ostern und Weihnachten zusammenfallen ("When Easter and Christmas coincide")
- In modern Greek: “The fly ate iron”
- In Hungarian: majd ha piros hó esik ("when it's snowing red")
- In Italian: Quando gli asini voleranno ("When donkeys fly").
- In Latvian: Kad pūcei aste ziedēs ("When an owl's tail blooms")
- In Levantine Arabic: لما ينوّر الملح (lamma ynawwer al-malħ), ("when salt blooms")
- In Malay: Tunggu kucing bertanduk ("when cats grow horns").
- In Malayalam: "കാക്ക മലർന്നു പറക്കും (kākka malarnnu paṟakkuṃ)" ("When [the] crow will fly upside down").
- In Persian: vaght-e gol-e ney ("when bamboo blossoms")
- In Polish: Prędzej mi kaktus na dłoni wyrośnie ("Sooner the cactus grows on my palm.").
- In Portuguese: quando as galinhas tiverem dentes ("when hens grow teeth"), nem que a vaca tussa ("not even if the cow coughs"), nem que chovam canivetes ("not even if it rains penknives"), no dia de São Nunca à tarde ("in the afternoon of St. Never's day").
- in Romanian: La Paştele Cailor ("on horses' Easter")
- In Russian: когда рак на горе свистнет (kogdá rak na goré svístnet, "when the crawfish whistles on the mountain").
- In Serbian or Croatian: kad na vrbi rodi grožđe ("when grapes grow on a willow").
- In Slovak: keď budú padať traktory ("when tractors will fall") or na svätého dindi ("On St. Dindi" probably taken from French.)
- In Spanish: cuando las vacas vuelen ("when cows fly"), cuando los chanchos vuelen ("when pigs fly"), cuando las ranas críen pelo ("when frogs grow hair").
- In Sumerian: “My ox will provide milk for you!”
- in Swedish: två torsdagar i veckan ("two Thursdays in the same week"). It is also said as "two Sundays in the same week", but other weekdays are rarely used.
- In Turkish: balık kavağa çıkınca ("when fish climb poplar trees").
- In Uyghur as spoken in Xinjiang: “To avoid hurting my friend’s feelings, I got pregnant” (said by a male).

== See also ==
- Aposiopesis
- Black swan theory
- Nonsense
- Paradox
- 'Pataphysics
- Scarborough Fair (ballad)

== References and further reading ==
- Some Notes on the Adynaton in Medieval Literature
- Ronald Grambo, Adynaton Symbols in Proverbs. A Few Fragmentary Remarks (pp. 456–458). Proverbium 15. Helsinki 1970.
- Martti Haavio, Omöjlighetssymboler i finsk epik (pp. 73-83). Sed och Sägen 1956.
- Myers, J., Wukasch, D. Dictionary of poetic terms.
- Henrik Ibsens Skrifter Brand. Peer Gynt. Universitetet i Oslo. H. Aschehoug & Co. (William Nygaard). Oslo 2007. ISBN 82-03-19002-2.
- Opata, D. "Adynaton Symbols in Igbo Proverbial Usage." Lore & Languages, VI (1) (1987): 51–57.
