= Anna Healy, Baroness Healy of Primrose Hill =

British politician

The Right Honourable The Baroness Healy of Primrose Hill
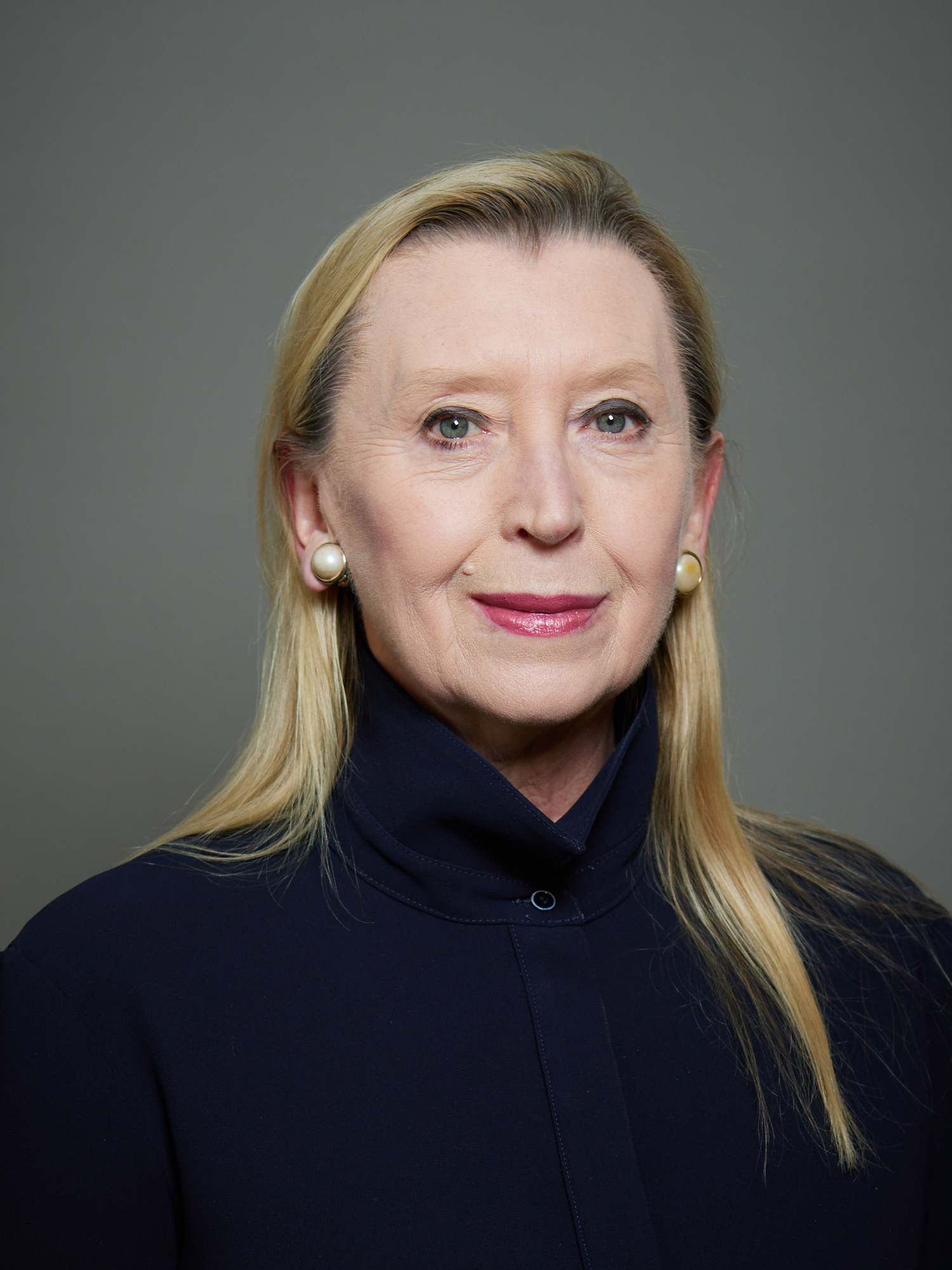
- Healy in 2022

Member of the House of Lords
- Lord Temporal
- Life peerage 19 July 2010

Personal details
- Born: 10 May 1955 (age 71)
- Party: Labour
- Spouse: Jon Cruddas
- Children: 1
- Education: Royal Holloway College
- Committees: Communications and Digital Committee (2013–2016, 2023–); Joint Committee on the National Security Strategy (2017–2022)

Anna Mary Healy, Baroness Healy of Primrose Hill (born 10 May 1955) is a British Labour politician and member of the House of Lords, a former special adviser and public affairs consultant.

== Career ==
She came to Britain with her family from County Mayo in west Ireland in the 1950s. She graduated with a BA in Modern History & Politics from Royal Holloway College in 1976 and has worked for the Labour Party since 1978, initially in the Downing Street back rooms under the Callaghan ministry. She was a key figure in the Labour Party during the 1980s, later described as an "insiders' insider" and as a "party loyalist". She served as a parliamentary press officer and strategist for 15 years.

She was special adviser to Mo Mowlam as the secretary of state for Northern Ireland from 1997 to 1998, to Jack Cunningham as minister for the Cabinet Office from 1998 to 1999, to Baron Macdonald of Tradeston as the minister of state for transport in 2001, to John Prescott as deputy prime minister from 2001 to 2003, and to Harriet Harman as leader of the House of Commons from 2007 to 2010 (initially on press). She worked in the Cabinet Office under Tony Blair's premiership and was then a senior parliamentary press officer for the Labour Party for six years. During Harman's 2010 tenure as interim leader of the Labour Party, she served as her chief of staff.

In February 2000, she became a press and strategic communications co-ordinator at Carlton Television, working alongside David Cameron who was director of corporate affairs. She left the role to advise Harriet Harman. In July 2000, she also joined the London branch of the Canadian public affairs consultancy GPC, led by Peter Bingle and acquired by Fleishman-Hillard by 2006.

== Peerage ==
She was created a life peer in the 2010 Dissolution Honours, taking the title Baroness Healy of Primrose Hill, of Primrose Hill in the London Borough of Camden, on 19 July 2010.

In the House of Lords, she has sat on the HIV and AIDS Committee in the United Kingdom (2010–2011), on the Communications and Digital Committee (2013–2016 and from 2023), on the Parliamentary Privilege Joint Committee (in 2013), and on the Joint Committee on the National Security Strategy (2017–2022). She has served as deputy chairman of committees from 2020 and as deputy speaker from 2024.

She is the parliamentary champion for Allergy UK, and vice chair of the all-party parliamentary group on Emerging Drugs and Online Behavioural Trends.

In 2025, she was among the supporters of Mainstream, a soft left pressure group within the Labour Party founded by Compass and Open Labour.

== Personal life ==
Healy married Jon Cruddas, a Labour MP, in 1992. They have one child: a son, Emmett.
