= Mainstream (political organisation) =

British centre-left political network

- Formation: 6 August 2025; 12 months ago
- Legal status: Private company limited by guarantee
- Purpose: Democratic socialism Progressivism
- Headquarters: 7 Cecil Road, London, United Kingdom
- Location: United Kingdom
- Chair of the Interim Council: Kerry Postlewhite
- National Coordinator: Luke Hurst
- Interim Council: Kerry Postlewhite, Mark Cooke, Alex Sobel, Ruth Lister, Neal Lawson, Sue Goss, Lauren Davison, Pablo John
- Affiliations: Labour Party; Co-operative Party
- Website: www.mainstreamlabour.org

Mainstream Labour or simply Mainstream is a British centre-left political network associated with the British Labour Party, co-founded by Open Labour and Compass in September 2025 to reverse what it sees as Labour's "clear drift to the right" under Keir Starmer to prevent the rise of right-wing populism in the UK. Ideologically described as sitting on the soft left of the Labour Party, Mainstream describes itself as the home of Labour's "radical realists" and promotes a democratic socialist platform which includes taxing wealth, introducing democratic reforms and placing key utilities into public ownership.

According to its founders, Mainstream is intended to serve as a broad-church for Labour's progressive left, including both members on the Labour left and centrists associated with New Labour, rather than a political faction or caucus. Its membership is formed from a broad alliance of Labour politicians on the Labour left and soft left, as well as the more progressive elements of New Labour.

== History ==
Mainstream Labour was formally instituted on 6 August 2025. It was co-founded by Labour members involved with Compass, a centre-left think tank, and Open Labour, a soft left organisation in the Labour Party. A month later, the network launched publicly with a founding statement signed by figures from across the Labour Party, including Andy Burnham, Paula Barker, Clive Efford, Clive Lewis, Simon Opher and Alex Sobel, declaring itself to be the home of Labour's "radical realists".

The network said its main aim is to reverse what it sees as Labour's "clear drift to the right" under Keir Starmer, which it described as "wildly out of step with the majority in the Labour Party", by campaigning for the party to move back towards a more left-wing and democratic socialist platform, in order to prevent the rise of right-wing populism in the UK. According to the network's organisers, Mainstream is intended to serve as a broad-church for the Labour Party's progressive left, ranging from members on the Labour left to party centrists associated with New Labour, rather than a political faction or caucus, although it has been described by observers such as George Eaton of The New Statesman as ideologically sitting on the soft left of the Labour Party. It has been closely associated with Andy Burnham, one of its main founding members.

Mainstream was founded ahead of the 2025 Labour Party deputy leadership election, and it is believed that the network is planning to stand or organise behind a deputy leadership candidate. The group also plans to submit a motion jointly endorsed by Open Labour, Compass and Momentum at the 2025 Labour Party Conference calling for Keir Starmer's government to abolish the two-child benefit cap by raising £6 billion through taxes against the online gambling industry and banks, which would cover the costs of doing so. In September 2025, Mainstream coordinator Luke Hurst criticised the choice to appoint Peter Mandelson as ambassador to the US earlier in the year in spite of his known friendship with Jeffrey Epstein. Hurst said the appointment was the result of "[putting] your party faction's interest before your party and before the country", and called for "a government and party of all the talents and all the views".

== Policy platform ==
Mainstream's founding statement declares the group to be "the home for radical realists" within the Labour Party. It promotes a democratic socialist platform, which includes the devolution of power "as widely and deeply as possible", the introduction of taxes on wealth, the ending of the two-child benefit cap and the public ownership of key public industries. The network also criticises factionalism within the Labour Party and calls for pluralism.

The network's stated priorities include:

- Being an open, welcoming place for all Labour members and supporters to discuss the vision, values, policy and electoral strategy of the Party.
- Publishing and holding events across the country to generate real debate that leads to robust and ambitious ideas, policies and strategies for a democratic socialist future.
- Campaigning on economic, social, democratic and environmental issues that will defeat authoritarian populism at the ballot box and win hearts and minds for the long-term transformation of our country.
- Working to ensure the Labour Party is democratic and that the voices and views of all members are heard, respected and heeded.

== Organisation ==
Mainstream is incorporated as a private company limited by guarantee. The network's registered headquarters are 7 Cecil Road, London, United Kingdom. Its political direction and priorities are currently coordinated by an Interim Council chaired by Kerry Postlewhite and which also includes Alex Sobel MP, Baroness Ruth Lister, Sue Goss, Councillor Lauren Davison, Mark Cooke, Neal Lawson and Pablo John. It has a National Coordinator, Luke Hurst, who is responsible for the day-to-day running of the organisation and its political organising. The organisation plans to hold elections for a larger Council after the first year of its activity, as well as 'events, activities and campaigns'. The founders of the network plan to organise a grassroots campaign for "bold but practical reforms" in Constituency Labour Parties throughout the UK.

== Membership ==
Described as belonging to the Labour Party's soft left, Mainstream Labour's membership is formed from a broader alliance of Labour politicians on the left and soft left of the Labour Party as well as the more progressive elements of New Labour, with the network's organisers describing it as a broad-church of the progressive left. Notable founding members of the group include then Mayor of Greater Manchester Andy Burnham, Momentum founder Jon Lansman, Tribune Group chair Clive Efford, Blue Labour's Jon Cruddas, New Labour ministers Clare Short and John Denham, Tony Blair advisor Geoff Mulgan, Ed Miliband advisor Stewart Wood, Open Labour founder Alex Sobel and left-wing MPs associated with former leader Jeremy Corbyn, including Clive Lewis, Dawn Butler, Olivia Blake and Paula Barker. The network also has the support of former Labour leader Neil Kinnock.

=== Parliamentary membership ===
In the House of Commons:

- Paula Barker, MP for Liverpool Wavertree
- Olivia Blake, MP for Sheffield Hallam
- Andy Burnham, MP for Makerfield, Prime Minister of the United Kingdom, and Leader of the Labour Party
- Dawn Butler, MP for Brent East
- Clive Efford, MP for Eltham and Chislehurst and Chair of the Tribune Group of MPs
- Chris Hinchliff, MP for North East Hertfordshire
- Peter Lamb, MP for Crawley
- Clive Lewis, MP for Norwich South
- Rachael Maskell, MP for York Central
- Connor Naismith, MP for Crewe and Nantwich
- Dr Simon Opher, MP for Stroud
- Alex Sobel, MP for Leeds Central and Headingley

In the House of Lords:

- Lord Dubs
- Baroness Healy
- Baroness Lister, Vice Chair of Compass
- Lord Whitty, General Secretary of the Labour Party, 1985–94
- Lord Wood of Anfield

In the Scottish Parliament:

- Paul Sweeney, MSP for Glasgow
