= Joint Committee on Human Rights =

UK Parliamentary committee

The Joint Committee on Human Rights is a joint committee of the Parliament of the United Kingdom. The remit of the committee is to consider human rights issues in the United Kingdom.

== Chairs ==
Committee chairs include those listed below.

Name	Start	End	Party	Constituency
Jean Corston	17 January 2001	11 April 2005	Labour	Bristol East
Andrew Dismore	18 July 2005	6 May 2010	Labour	Hendon
Hywel Francis	8 September 2010	30 March 2015	Labour	Aberavon
Harriet Harman	29 October 2015	21 July 2022	Labour	Camberwell and Peckham
Joanna Cherry	21 July 2022	21 June 2023	Scottish National Party	Edinburgh South West
Harriet Harman	21 June 2023	10 January 2024	Labour	Camberwell and Peckham
Joanna Cherry	10 January 2024	30 May 2024	Scottish National Party	Edinburgh South West
David Alton, Baron Alton of Liverpool	4 December 2024	9 September 2026	Crossbench	Life peer
Alex Sobel	9 September 2026	present	Labour	Leeds Central and Headingley

== Membership ==
As of October 2026, the members of the committee are as follows:

Member	Party	Constituency / Peerage
Alex Sobel(Chair)	Labour	Leeds Central and Headingley
Shami Chakrabarti	Labour	Baroness Chakrabarti
Tom Gordon	Liberal Democrat	Harrogate and Knaresborough
Sally Hamwee	Liberal Democrat	Baroness Hamwee
Afzal Khan	Labour	Manchester Rusholme
Martha Lane Fox	Crossbench	Baroness Lane-Fox of Soho
Rachel Maclean	Conservative	Baroness Maclean of Redditch
Simon Murray	Conservative	Baron Murray of Blidworth
Russell Rook	Labour	Baron Rook
Euan Stainbank	Labour	Falkirk
Peter Swallow	Labour	Bracknell
Desmond Swayne	Conservative	New Forest West

== Findings ==
The Joint Committee on Human Rights released a report on September 14, 2026, warning that artificial intelligence creates major human rights risks. Furthermore, the cross party group stated that current laws cannot properly handle fast AI developments and called for a new AI law to address these threats.
