= Soft left =

Political faction in the British Labour Party

The soft left, also known as the open left, inside left and historically as the Tribunite left, is a faction within the British Labour Party. The term soft left was coined to distinguish the mainstream left, represented by former leader Michael Foot, from the hard left, represented by Tony Benn. People belonging to the soft left may be called soft leftists or Tribunites. As of 2025, it is the largest faction in the Parliamentary Labour Party. Ideologically, it is described as centre-left.

== Definition ==
In the context of the Labour Party, the term soft left was coined in 1981, when Neil Kinnock refused to support Tony Benn for the deputy leadership of the Labour Party. It described a faction of the party which disagreed with the conservative tendencies of the Labour right and the radical tendencies of the "Bennite" left, also known as the hard left. In parliament, it was represented by the Tribune Group of MPs and consequently came to be known as the Tribunite left as well. The soft left also aligned itself with the Labour Co-ordinating Committee (LCC).

The soft left was initially considered another faction in the Labour left along with the Bennite left, though unlike the Bennite left, it was willing to compromise on some issues to keep the party united and electable. Neil Kinnock, a leader of the soft left, became leader of the Labour Party in 1983. When he moved rightwards in this role, the soft left followed him. As alliances were made between the soft left and the party leadership, the ideological distinctiveness of the LCC and the Tribune Group declined. The soft left formed an alliance with the Labour right to oppose the Bennite left and support Kinnock's leadership. During his leadership, the soft left also formed a new moderniser faction with members of the Labour right against the party's traditionalist faction. The soft left was no longer an identifiable faction on the Labour left by the time of the 1992 general election, with the Tribune Group disbanding by the time Tony Blair became Labour leader in 1994. The process whereby the soft left drifted away from the Labour left and pitched itself against the Bennite left is known as the "realignment of the left".

In modern politics, the soft left refers to a faction in the Labour Party which opposed the New Labour project but has avoided the politics of the modern Labour left, also known as the hard left. Ideologically, it is described as centre-left and is typically thought to occupy the space in the party between the Labour left and the Labour right. While the Labour left is more supportive of socialism, the soft left is more supportive of social democracy. It believes in compromising more traditional socialist policies to make Labour more electable. It is one of the four main factions in the modern Labour Party.

The term soft left has been said to carry negative connotations which can suggest a less enthusiastic approach to socialism. It has been argued that the term inside left should be used instead. The left-leaning magazines New Statesman and Tribune have used the term as well. However, unlike the term hard left, which can be considered pejorative, "soft left" members have used the term as a self-descriptor to distance themselves from the "hard left". Soft left MP Lisa Nandy advocates a "better name" for the faction; she has said the term "sounds a bit like you've sort of collapsed into a jellyfish". Open Labour, the main organisation representing the soft left, has preferred to use the term "open left".

== History ==
The distinction between hard and soft left became evident during the leadership of Michael Foot (1980–1983), who, along with Tony Benn, was one of the two figureheads of the party left. Supporters of Foot (an anti-communist whose background was in the Tribune group) and Benn (originally on the party's right but by the end of the 1970s to Foot's left and a more uncompromising supporter of unilateral nuclear disarmament) became increasingly polarised.

In the election for the deputy leadership of the Labour Party in 1981, left-wingers such as Neil Kinnock abstained from voting for Tony Benn, signaling the emergence of an independent soft left grouping in the party. The term came to be used in contrast to hard left, who were more explicitly socialist in rhetoric, remaining associated with Benn. In common with the party right, the soft left was suspicious of the hard left's alliance with Trotskyism (particularly its links with Militant), supported a parliamentary rather than extra-parliamentary road to socialism, retreated from a commitment to widening public ownership of the economy, and tended towards Atlanticist or Europeanist rather than anti-imperialist foreign policy.

The parliamentary group which came to be associated with the soft left was the Tribune group. The Tribune group was formed around the newspaper of the same name and had represented the party left as a whole until Benn's allies formed the Socialist Campaign Group. The Labour Co-ordinating Committee grew to become the soft left's main factional organisation in the 1980s, despite having begun its life as a Bennite or "hard left" body. The soft left, influenced by the intellectual interventions of Mike Rustin, Geoff Hodgson and Peter Hain, increasingly rejected the socialism from above of Stalinism and social democracy. It stressed pluralism, including multifarious forms of social ownership and widening Labour's electoral coalition. Figures identified with the soft left in the 1980s included MPs David Blunkett, Robin Cook, Bryan Gould and Clare Short.

While Kinnock initially emerged from the soft left, portraying himself as a "media-friendly Michael Foot", he tacked to the right of the Tribune group, although they continued to vote with him in the National Executive Committee. Soft left candidates increasingly gained positions in the party leadership after 1983, but Kinnock and deputy leader Roy Hattersley kept the party to their right. Kinnock's defeat in the 1992 general election signalled an end to the soft left's rise, as they were increasingly marginalised by the modernisation project associated with Tony Blair. The 1980s soft left began to diverge over time; for example, some figures (such as Blunkett) became loyalists to Blair by the end of the 1990s. However, activist figures such as the National Executive Committee member Ann Black and a range of MPs continued to work as part of the 'broad left'.

== Contemporary soft left ==
In 2015, Neal Lawson, the chair of the think tank Compass, identified the organisation as a successor to the soft left. Compass disaffiliated from Labour in 2011 in order to open up their membership to people belonging to other political parties. The activist group Open Labour was launched in 2015 with the aim of developing a new forum for the soft left political tradition within the party, which it hopes to recast as the "Open Left". In the 2017 general election, several Open Labour activists were elected to Parliament including Open Labour Treasurer Alex Sobel, Emma Hardy, and Rosie Duffield.

In the aftermath of the party leadership (2015–20) of Jeremy Corbyn, who has been identified as a hard left MP, the term was generally used to mean "the space between Corbynite remnants on the left, and Progress and Labour First on the right". Keir Starmer, the leader of the Labour Party from 2020 to 2026, and Angela Rayner, the deputy leader from 2020 to 2025, have both been described as soft left. In 2025, Mainstream was founded as an umbrella group of various Soft Left organisations within Labour to challenge what they saw as the rightwards shift of the Labour government.

== Labour politicians on the soft left ==
People belonging to the soft left may be called soft leftists or Tribunites. The following Labour politicians are often considered to have been on the soft left of the party for at least some of their careers, but may not identify themselves as such:

- Andy Burnham
- John Denham
- Anneliese Dodds
- Angela Eagle
- Barry Gardiner
- Kate Green
- Nia Griffith
- Louise Haigh
- John Healey
- Sadiq Khan
- Ed Miliband
- Lisa Nandy
- Angela Rayner
- Alex Sobel
- Paul Sweeney
- Emily Thornberry

== See also ==
- Anti-Stalinist left
- Bevanism
- Blairism
- Brownism
- Centrism
- Democratic socialism
- Left-wing politics
- Manchesterism
- Militant tendency
- Momentum (organisation)
- Political moderate
- Social democracy
- Social Democratic Party (UK)
- Third Way
