= Ann Black =

British political official

Ann Black OBE
- Born: 20 November 1950 (age 75)
- Years active: 2000–present
- Known for: Member of the Labour Party's National Executive Committee

Ann Black OBE is a British political activist who serves as a member of the National Executive Committee of the Labour Party (NEC). She served from 2000 to 2018 and was re-elected in November 2020. She was chair of the NEC from 2009 to 2010, and has also served as chair of the NEC's disputes panel.

== Career ==
In 2013, Black worked as a computer programmer at Oxford Brookes University. She is a member of the Unison trade union.

== Political career ==
Black is noted for publishing regular detailed reports of NEC meetings. This was initially controversial, but eventually considered normal and led to other NEC members doing likewise. She had started publishing meeting report in July 1999 when she was a member of the National Policy Forum.

=== Labour in government, 2000–2010 ===
Black was first elected to the Labour Party's National Executive Committee (NEC) as a representative for Constituency Labour Party groups (CLPs) in 2000. At the time, she was campaigning for pensions to be linked to earnings instead of prices.

In September 2002, Black wrote a paper for the committee expressing concern about the invading Iraq. In 2003, she wrote a statement encouraging the government to hold a referendum on introducing the Euro. Later that year, she voted in favour of readmitting the mayor of London Ken Livingstone to the Labour Party after he had been expelled for running for election against a Labour candidate in the 2000 London mayoral election, but against using the selection method a Labour incumbent official would go through. In 2004, she wrote to the Labour leader and prime minister Tony Blair opposing his invitation of Ayad Allawi, the prime minister of Iraq, saying that "most people want to put Iraq behind them and unite around Labour's positive domestic agenda". She spoke out against the Labour government's plans to introduce ID cards in 2005. She was re-elected a CLP representative in 2006. In 2009, she served as vice-chair of the NEC. In the same year, she was one of three members of a panel of NEC members that investigated allegations against Labour MPs in the United Kingdom parliamentary expenses scandal. In 2010, she was chair of the NEC.

=== Labour in opposition, 2010–2024 ===
In the 2010 Labour Party leadership election, Black urged Labour Members of Parliament to nominate candidates they might not go on to vote for in order to provide a more diverse range of candidates, which was seen as support for nominating Diane Abbott. When determining the rules for the 2015 Labour Party leadership election, Black opposed checking new members against the party's canvassing records. In the election, she was reported as having voted for Jeremy Corbyn. Later that year, she worked on a report about representation of women in the Labour Party with the shadow minister for women and equalities Kate Green.

In July 2016, Owen Smith challenged Corbyn for the leadership of the party in the 2016 Labour Party leadership election. Black supported Corbyn being automatically included on ballots, and an increase in the price to become a registered supporter of the party. She also proposed that members who joined before 24 June should be able to vote, but the proposal failed due to a tied vote. She then supported making 12 January the cut-off. In the election, she was reported as having voted for Corbyn. Ahead of the 2016 election for CLP representatives on the NEC, the Labour Representation Committee said that it wouldn't support Black due to her votes determining the electorate for the 2016 leadership election, and for supporting the suspension of Brighton and Hove Labour Party. It went on to support her as part of the Centre-Left Grassroots Alliance (CLGA) group of candidates. In October 2016, Black was re-elected to the NEC with more votes than any other candidate.

In January 2018, Black was replaced as chair of the committee's disputes panel with Christine Shawcroft, who Stephen Bush described in the New Statesman as "regarded as more of a reliable factional operator". Shawcroft resigned from the role in March of the same year. In February, Momentum announced a slate of candidates for the year's elections to the NEC that didn't include Black, reportedly because of how Black had voted to determine the electorate for the 2016 leadership election. She was expected to win the election to be chair of the National Policy Forum (NPF) later that month. The election was postponed by allies of Corbyn minutes before it was due to go ahead. Black was elected as chair of the NPF in April 2018. Black stood in the 2018 election for CLP representatives on the NEC without the support of the CLGA. During the election, Momentum withdrew its support for Peter Willsman, which led to speculation that Black might win a seat. She came in thirteenth place, with nine candidates elected.

In September 2019, after the 2019 United Kingdom general election was announced, Black criticised the NEC for prioritising formal re-selection processes for Labour MPs over organising selections for constituencies which didn't have a candidate.

Black has been described as "independently minded" and "left-wing", and a swing vote on the NEC.

In 2020, Black was re-elected to the NEC.

=== Labour in government, 2024–2026 ===
In 2024, she was re-elected again. She was backed by Open Labour, a soft left group in the party.

On 26 January 2026, Black announced she would not stand for re-election that year, saying "it's time for future generations to see the party through the next election".

== Honours ==
Black was made an Officer of the British Empire (OBE) in the 2013 Birthday Honours for "parliamentary and political service".
