= Open Labour =

Activist group in the British Labour Party

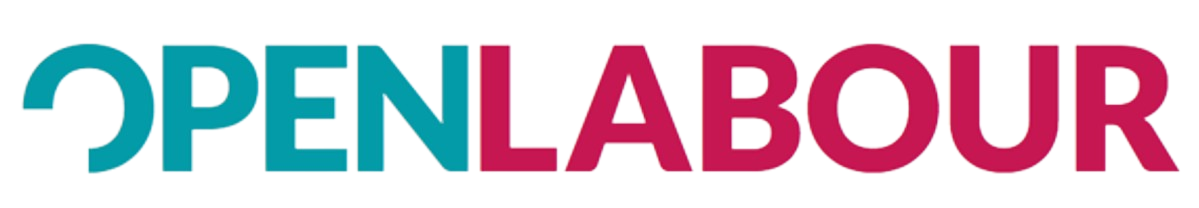
- Merged into: Mainstream
- Formation: 10 December 2015; 10 years ago
- Dissolved: 9 August 2026; 3 months ago
- Purpose: Political advocacy
- Location: United Kingdom
- Chair: Amen Tesfay
- Affiliations: Labour Party
- Revenue: £3,114 (2018)
- Expenses: £1,147 (2018)
- Website: openlabour.org

Open Labour is an activist group in the British Labour Party which acts as a forum for members to discuss ideas, tactics and campaigning. It is in the soft left political tradition, to the right of left-wing groups like Momentum and to the left of New Labour groups such as Progress.

== History ==
Open Labour was founded in 2015 following the 2015 Labour Party leadership election with the aim of giving voice to the soft left tradition within the Labour Party, and their interests, which many of its members felt had been sidelined.

The soft left tradition within Labour traces back to, at least, the 1980s. While many Labour MPs, including the recent Labour leader Ed Miliband, had at times been characterised as coming from the soft left politically, there had not been an internal group advocating for this strand of politics since Compass unaffiliated from the party in 2011 in order to open up its membership to those from other political parties.

From 2015 to 2026, Open Labour produced and published a number of essays across a range of topics on its website, and has held meetings and conferences routinely to establish its strategy and political positions. It has also held a number of political fringe events at Labour Party conferences. Open Labour has offered its backing to candidates in internal party elections and candidate selections for local and general elections. Several Open Labour activists and members were elected to Parliament in the 2017 United Kingdom general election, including Open Labour Treasurer Alex Sobel, Jo Platt, Emma Hardy, Anna McMorrin, Paul Sweeney, Marsha de Cordova, and Lloyd Russell-Moyle.

Founding committee member Ann Black was a longstanding member of Labour's National Executive Committee, with the group backing her in her failed re-election bid in 2018.

In the 2019 General Election a number of Open Labour supporters and members were elected to parliament, including Nadia Whittome, Olivia Blake, Feryal Clark, James Murray, and Abena Oppong-Asare.

Open Labour made no endorsement during the 2016 Labour leadership elections. During the 2020 Labour leadership elections, Open Labour endorsed Lisa Nandy for Leader and Angela Rayner for Deputy Leader after an extensive ballot of its members.

In the 2020 National Executive Committee elections, its members voted to endorse Ann Black and Jermain Jackman for the CLP section, George Lindars-Hammond for the new disability section and Alice Perry for the local government section, with Black and Perry winning election. In 2021, the organisation said its membership stood at 1,500 and it plans to make a number of endorsements for upcoming local and devolved elections.

== Political positions ==
Coming politically from the soft left tradition within Labour, Open Labour looked to recast this ideology as the "open left", defining it as "a practical, open-minded and tolerant type of democratic socialism". The group promotes a "democratic, participatory and pluralist culture".

Their beliefs include advocating an economic platform of transforming the UK economy to a higher-investment, environmentally conscious and more democratic model. They are also generally pro-European, and call for Labour to maintain a close relationship with Europe and its sister parties on the continent, and for solidarity with those campaigning for social justice here and internationally.

Open Labour has roots in the history of organisations like the Tribune Group and the Labour Coordinating Committee, but also through local government and through trade unions.

In an article about the 2017 Labour Party Conference, Isabel Hardman described the group as "[carrying] the Corbynite flag", arguing that it and the wider soft left in Labour had shifted to the left after that year's general election.

== Mainstream Labour ==
In September 2025, Open Labour co-founded Mainstream Labour, a centre-left network inside the Labour Party alongside the think tank Compass. This group, backed by several senior figures including then Mayor of Greater Manchester and later Prime Minister Andy Burnham, which claims to be a home to "Labour's radical realists" and wanted to change the incumbent Labour government's direction. The group formally dissolved and merged with Mainstream in August 2026.
