= Christine Shawcroft =

British political activist

Christine Linda Shawcroft (born April 1955) is a British Labour Party activist and former politician.

Shawcroft is a director of Momentum, and was elected as the chair of the Labour Party's Disputes Sub-Committee in January 2018. In March 2018, she resigned from her post after she disputed the suspension of a Labour candidate who was accused of Holocaust denial. She later resigned her position on Labour's National Executive Committee.

== Early career ==
Shawcroft has worked for many years as a teacher in the East End of London. She was elected as a Labour Party member of Tower Hamlets London Borough Council in a 1985 by-election, representing Blackwall, and served for two years as leader of the Labour group on the council, while it was in opposition. She served on the executive of the London Labour Party.

From the mid-1990s, prospective Labour council candidates had to be vetted by a selection panel, and Shawcroft was refused permission to defend her council seat in 1998, Liz Davies claiming that this was due to Shawcroft's left-wing views. She was also rejected as a potential candidate for the London Assembly.

== Member of the NEC ==
In 1998, Shawcroft stood for the party's National Executive Committee (NEC) as part of the Grassroots Alliance slate. The slate took four out of six seats in the constituency section, but Shawcroft was not elected. The following year, she took second place in the vote and finally gained a place on the NEC. She retained her seat at each subsequent election.

At the 2001 United Kingdom general election, Shawcroft stood in Meriden, taking second place with 39.2% of the vote.

Shawcroft was a leading member of the Labour Representation Committee, a left-wing group within the Labour Party, but resigned in 2012 in protest of it taking control of the Labour Briefing journal. With other opponents of this takeover, she became a director of a new Labour Briefing publication.

In 2015, Shawcroft was briefly suspended from the Labour Party after she gave support to Lutfur Rahman, the former mayor of Tower Hamlets.

A supporter of Jeremy Corbyn, and also of Jon Lansman, Shawcroft became a director of Momentum. In January 2018, she was elected as chair of the Labour Party's Disputes Sub-Committee, defeating Ann Black.

During the process to choose the next general secretary of the Labour Party in March 2018, following the resignation of Iain McNicol, Shawcroft was vocal in her support for Jon Lansman of Momentum over Jennie Formby of the Unite union, a contest which was proving divisive among supporters of Jeremy Corbyn. She commented on Facebook: "Nothing would induce me to support a candidate from a major trade union, they stick it to the rank and file members time after time after time. It’s also time to support disaffiliation of the unions from the Labour Party. The party belongs to us, the members". The comments, which were soon deleted, caused consternation among trade unionists and Momentum distanced itself from Shawcroft's statement.

In February 2018, she decided not to re-stand for the NEC in the election to be held that summer.

At the end of March 2018, after a leak to The Times, she resigned from the Disputes Sub-Committee after casting doubt on the case for a suspension, offering "partisan disputes in local parties" as an explanation for the dispute. Alan Bull, intended to be a candidate in the 2018 Peterborough City Council election, had in 2015 shared a (faked) article in a closed Facebook group headlined: "International Red Cross Report Confirms the Holocaust of Six Million Jews is a Hoax" accompanied by a photograph of the gates at Auschwitz, to "invite discussion and debate". "I'm not an anti-Semite, I am not a holocaust denier - I support equal rights for Palestinian people," Bull later said. Shawcroft said she was not fully aware of the facts at the time of sending the email and, if she had been, would have reacted differently. A few days later, after seeing the "abhorrent image", she wrote on Facebook that she had told the member that he should be sent for training about antisemitism, and that the issue within the Labour Party was being used to attack Jeremy Corbyn. Bull later removed the post.

On 31 March 2018, Shawcroft issued a further statement in which she indicated that, while "it has been a privilege to serve on the Labour party National Executive Committee for the last 19 years", she was resigning from the body "with immediate effect". She was replaced on the NEC by Eddie Izzard.
