= Peter Willsman =

British political activist (born 1944)

Peter Rupert William Willsman (born February 1944) is a British political activist who was a member of the Labour Party's National Executive Committee and the secretary of the Campaign for Labour Party Democracy.

He was suspended from the Labour Party and the NEC in May 2019, pending investigation, after publicity over making antisemitic comments, and then expelled in November 2022.

== Early life and career ==
Willsman was born in Andover in 1944.

He worked for the National Union of Public Employees as a researcher.

== Political activism ==
As a delegate representing Canterbury's constituency party to Labour's 1976 conference, Willsman unsuccessfully moved a resolution to make comprehensive education compulsory by 1977, rather than maintaining a system with grammar schools and independent schools.

From the 1970s, Willsman has been a central member of the Campaign for Labour Party Democracy, a left-wing group that campaigns for more power to be given to party members, and is its secretary.

Every year between 1981 and 1994, Willsman was elected onto the Labour Party's Conference Arrangements Committee. He was described as one of the left wing of the party's "key strategists" in 1981, having focused on party constitutional issues rather than ideological issues. In his time on this committee, Willsman had a reputation for his expertise on process.

Having lost his seat on this committee in 1994, he was elected to the party's disciplinary National Constitutional Committee in 1995.

He was elected as an Inner London Education Authority member for Woolwich in 1986 and served until the abolition of the authority in 1990.

Willsman has been a long-term, though intermittent, member of Labour's ruling body, the National Executive Committee (NEC). He was first elected in 1998 on a Grassroots Alliance slate. Having failed to win a seat in 2014, Willsman was elected with Momentum support in 2016, coming sixth in the section representing members. For the 2018 elections to the NEC, Willsman was included on Momentum's slate of promoted candidates due to his role as chair of the Campaign for Labour Party Democracy.

During a meeting in 2016, Willsman declared that he wanted the party to split to "get rid of the Blairites". In 2017, he said some disloyal Labour MPs "deserve to be attacked", though sources present at the meeting said it was clear that he meant the MPs should be criticised, rather than face physical violence.

=== Antisemitism allegations ===
In July 2018, Willsman was recorded during an NEC discussion on the party's disciplinary code and antisemitism as saying that he had "never seen" antisemitism in the Labour Party. He claimed that those making the accusations were "Trump fanatics" who were "making up duff information without any evidence at all". He was criticised by The Guardian and some Labour politicians, Marie van der Zyl, president of the Board of Deputies of British Jews, called for Willsman to be expelled and the Jewish Labour Movement made a formal complaint. After Willsman apologised, party chair Jennie Formby warned that a repeat occurrence would result in disciplinary action. Momentum withdrew its support for his candidacy for the NEC, even though voting had commenced, describing his remarks as "deeply insensitive and inappropriate", although he retained the support of Jewish Voice for Labour. He came in ninth place and was re-elected in the expanded section representing members: when other members of the Momentum slate asked him to resign given the late withdrawal of Momentum's endorsement, Willsman declined.

In May 2019, a recording of Willsman emerged from an informal conversation he had had with Israeli-American undercover author Tuvia Tenenbom in January 2019, which Willsman had been unaware was being recorded. Willsman had said "This is off the record. It's almost certain who is behind all this anti-Semitism against Jeremy [Corbyn], almost certainly it's the Israeli embassy." Willsman also said that an open letter on the issue signed by 68 rabbis the previous year was "obviously organised by the Israeli embassy". Willsman's comments were widely condemned, with several members of the NEC and Labour MPs calling for his expulsion. Later that month, Willsman was suspended from the party over the allegation, pending investigation. In late 2022, Willsman was expelled from the Labour Party.
