= Momentum (organisation) =

Left-wing campaigning organisation based in Great Britain

- Formation: 8 October 2015; 11 years ago
- Founder: Jon Lansman
- Location: London, England
- Region served: Great Britain
- Members: 20,000–30,000 (2021)
- Co-chairs: Sasha Das Gupta & Alex Charilaou
- Affiliations: Centre-Left Grassroots Alliance; Campaign for Socialism; Welsh Labour Grassroots; Progressive International
- Staff: 13 (2019)
- Website: peoplesmomentum.com

Momentum is a British left-wing political organisation which has been described as a grassroots movement supportive of the Labour Party; since January 2017, all Momentum members must be (or become) members of the party. It was founded in 2015 by Jon Lansman, Adam Klug, Emma Rees and James Schneider after Jeremy Corbyn's successful campaign to become Labour Party leader and it was reported to have between 20,000 and 30,000 members in 2021.

The organisation has polarised Labour politicians and journalists since it was founded. Momentum has been compared to the Labour Party's Militant tendency. The organisation originally set up – and maintains close ties with – The World Transformed.

== Stated aims and principles ==
Since its inception, Momentum has stated its core objective as "to create a mass movement for real progressive change". In their 2021 strategy document "Socialist Organising in a New Era", published on their website, Momentum has three strategic priorities:

1. Elect socialists and win the radical policies the current moment demands
2. Support struggles in our communities and workplaces
3. Scale up political education in our movement and across the country

Momentum has campaigned for the Labour Party to adopt certain pledges in its party manifesto. In 2019 it campaigned for the inclusion of a Green New Deal and a four-day workweek.

== Structure ==
Momentum is not a member-controlled unincorporated association — like the Labour Party, for example — but a private company. According to Companies House, the current officers of Momentum Campaign (Services) Ltd are solicitor Anthony Kearns (since 2019) and co-chairs Andrew Scattergood and Gaya Sriskanthan (since 2021). Momentum originally had a delegate system for an executive board, known as the steering committee. In late October 2016, the steering committee voted to adopt one member, one vote (OMOV) for a digital instead of the delegate system; the decision, however, was controversial and did not survive a general vote. A new constitution, including OMOV, was announced on 11 January 2017. New Momentum members were required to be members of the Labour Party, with existing Momentum members required to join the party by July of that year. Lansman initiated changes via email. After persuading the steering committee, he replaced the national committee with a Labour-only national coordinating group (NCG). A new online model of organisation without a regional structure was created to prevent far-left entryists dominating delegate meetings.

After a January 2017 Momentum survey with a response rate of over 40 per cent, the organisation's steering committee voted to introduce a new constitution. Lansman resigned as a director on 12 January 2017 (replaced by Christine Shawcroft) to stand for election to the steering committee. Momentum introduced its new constitutional structure in early March; the new NCG met on 11 March and a conference was held on 25 March, both in Birmingham. In 2020, the newly elected NCG began a process of "refounding Momentum". This was delayed due to the COVID-19 pandemic; however, the process of members re-writing the constitution was begun in 2021.

=== Membership ===
Year
2016	21,000
2017	31,000
2018	42,000
2019	40,000

In 2015 – the year it was founded – Momentum had 60,000 supporters (who paid no fees) and 50 local groups. By September 2017, it had 31,000 members in 170 local groups and a staff of 15. In January 2018, the group had 35,000 members. By April of that year, Momentum had 40,000 members. According to the organisation, 95 per cent of its funding comes from membership fees and small donations; the average fee is £3 per year. In July 2018, it was reported that Momentum had 42,000 members: 92 per cent (38,700) in England, four per cent (2,000) in Wales, and three per cent (1,300) in Scotland. Its membership base has been seen as falling into two types: young activists who joined the Labour Party during (and after) Corbyn's first leadership election in 2015, and older, left-wing veterans of the Labour Party and the far left.

In 2021, it was reported by the i paper that Momentum had between 20,000 and 30,000 members and remains the largest campaign group connected to the Labour Party. In late 2022, the Guardian reported that membership was down by one third from the peak, causing financial difficulties, and by early 2024 the Morning Star reported that membership had fallen to just over 10,000.

=== Relationship with other UK organisations ===
Momentum maintains close ties with the Centre-Left Grassroots Alliance, a coalition of left-wing groups in the Labour Party who nominate joint candidates for the National Executive Committee and other internal elected positions. In 2016, the Scottish left-wing Campaign for Socialism (CfS) formed a partnership with Momentum; although they remain separate organisations, they share membership and resources. CfS membership increased from 400 in 2015 to 1,418 by 2019. The left-wing Welsh Labour Grassroots has similar links to Momentum.

A few trade unions which are affiliated to the Labour Party have also affiliated to Momentum, providing some financial support. This includes the Communication Workers Union, Transport Salaried Staffs' Association, Bakers, Food and Allied Workers' Union and the Fire Brigades Union. There has been regular speculation in the media that Unite the Union would affiliate to Momentum also, but the idea has been rejected by the union- they have however collaborated strategically.

=== National Coordinating Group ===
In the first election (in 2018), eight Members' Representatives were elected: four for London and the South East; two for the Midlands, the East, the West and Wales; two for the North, Scotland and International; and four public-office holders. Thirty-four per cent of the membership (7,500) voted. Additional elections were held in April of that year for four positions in each of the four regional coordinating offices, and over 13,000 votes (35 per cent of the eligible membership) were cast.

For the second NCG election, in 2020, Momentum's represented geographic regions expanded from four to five. Two slates were nominated for all the positions: Momentum Renewal and Forward Momentum. Both were endorsed by left-wing figures, journalists and politicians, and their ideology had some overlap. Sam Bright of Byline Times wrote, "Both want to reform the democratic structures of the organisation; both want to see more devolution of powers to local groups; both want to defend the radical policies of the Corbyn era". The Momentum Renewal slate emphasised community trade-union organisation. Forward Momentum intended to further democratise Momentum, advocating greater democracy in the Labour Party and the use of open primaries for internal elections. Forward Momentum candidates won in all regions except for public-office holders.

In 2022, the third election took place. Two slates of candidates have emerged from this election "Your Momentum" and "Momentum Organisers". The outcome of the election was that the Momentum Organisers slate won 15 seats, whilst Your Momentum won 14 seats. 3,380 votes were cast.

== Background ==
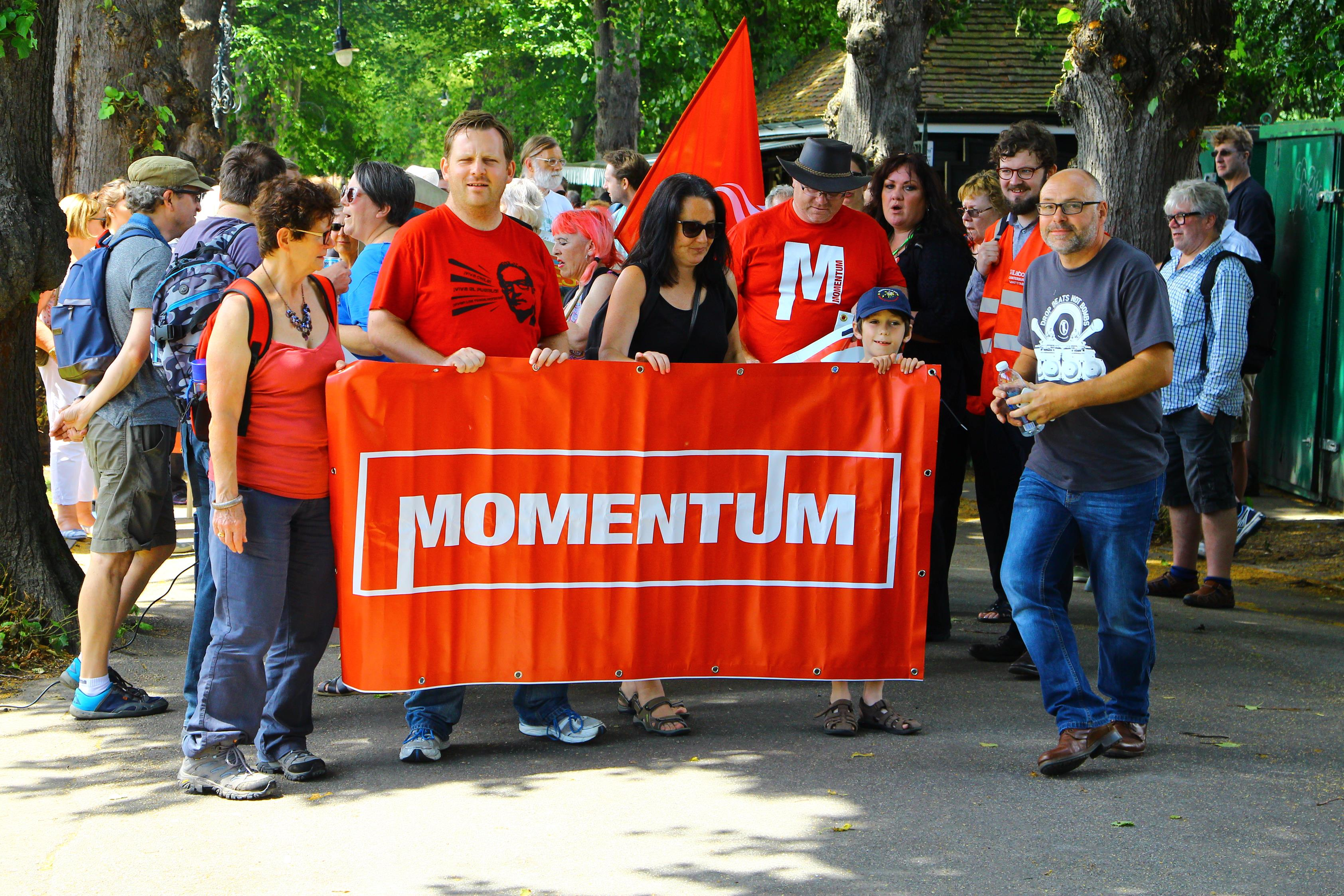
Momentum supporters at the Rally for Corbyn demonstration in Canterbury on 16 July 2016

Momentum was founded in 2015 by Jon Lansman and fellow national organisers Adam Klug, Emma Rees and James Schneider, four weeks after Jeremy Corbyn's successful campaign for the Labour Party leadership. Local groups formed to support Corbyn's leadership, uniting several factions of the left across Britain. Lansman was active in Tony Benn's 1981 deputy leadership bid and, after volunteering for Corbyn's leadership bid, had become the director of Jeremy Corbyn Campaign 2015 (Supporters) Ltd, which held the data collected during the campaign. In addition to their support of Corbyn, Momentum has three primary goals: to win elections for Labour, to create a socialist Labour government, and to help build a broader social movement. Corbyn was positive about Momentum after it was formed, saying in 2016: "I see Momentum as a social movement. A movement that will campaign on all of these issues. But above all, excite and unite people to come together, to come together to challenge injustice, inequality and social exclusion. Bring people together to achieve things together. That is what is makes us [Labour] so different from every other political party in this country."

When it was formed, Momentum wanted to focus on local and Labour Party issues. It was inspired by Syriza in Greece and Podemos in Spain, both of which used pragmatic, grassroots organising to counter the effects of fiscal austerity. The movement has also benefited from ideas by other campaigns operating on a left-wing or progressive platform, such as Bernie Sanders' campaigns to become a presidential candidate for the Democratic party in 2016 and 2020 and Beto O'Rourke's campaign to become a Democratic Senator in Texas.

=== International relationships ===
Momentum has formed ties with other political organisations across North America and Europe. They have collaborated with the Canadian Leap movement, the Young Socialists in the Social Democratic Party of Germany, the Democratic Socialists of America in the United States and similar organisations in Greece. In 2018, Rees and Klug made a ten-week lecture tour of the United States to educate progressive activists and members of the National Nurses United union on political campaigning techniques and to advise Real Justice.

=== Early infiltration from the far left ===
Members of the Parliamentary Labour Party (PLP) had raised concerns that parties on the far left of British politics, including the Trade Unionist and Socialist Coalition, Left Unity, the Socialist Workers Party (SWP), the Socialist Party and the Alliance for Workers' Liberty (AWL), might join Momentum to influence the Labour Party. Momentum was indeed mired by members of these groups and the disruption they caused in its organisation. An example was Jill Mountford, a longtime member of AWL who was accused of bullying with Momentum. The groups considered disbanding and supporting Momentum; in 2015, Left Unity members unsuccessfully proposed a merge with the organisation several times.

The movement has been compared to the Militant tendency, a Trotskyist group which was expelled by Labour under Neil Kinnock during the 1980s. Labour MP Owen Smith accused Momentum of using Militant-tendency tactics such as threatening to deselect Labour MPs, a concern echoed by former deputy Labour leader Roy Hattersley. Oliver Kamm of The Times wrote in October 2015, "Like the Trotskyists of a generation ago Momentum is an entrist organisation that's parasitic on the Labour host. This time, though, the far left has managed to gain control of the party structures and is intent on making life tough for Labour MPs". A Labour councillor in Liverpool in 2019 said about Momentum's presence in the city, "I think Momentum in Liverpool is a mask for Militant. There are decent Momentum people and then there are the others who have their own agenda".

Momentum and a number of political commentators characterise their supposed relationship with other groups as unfair, and in October 2015 the organisation said that it would resist such entryism. Author and journalist Michael Crick criticises the comparison to Militant, saying that "the rise of Jeremy Corbyn can be attributed more to the phenomenon of 'Corbynmania' than to hard-left entrism". Former Labour MP Peter Kilfoyle, the Merseyside Labour-leadership enforcer against Militant during the 1980s as the party's north-west regional organiser, also rejected the comparison and describing Momentum as filling the role on the left of the party as Progress did on the right. In December 2015, Labour deputy leader Tom Watson said on the Today programme: "They look like a bit of a rabble to me, but I don't think they are a problem for the Labour Party". James Schneider said in response to the accusation, "The purpose of Momentum is not to have internal factional battles, it's to look outside".

=== New Constitution ===
On 10 January 2017 Momentum's steering committee, in an email to members entitled "Momentum Moving Forwards", announced a new constitution for the organisation. A key feature was that all Momentum members must be, or become, members of the Labour Party. Jill Mountford described this as a "coup" by Lansman. As Labour Party rules state that members must not be a member of any other registered political party (save the Co-operative party), this meant that members of organisations like the SWP could no longer stay in Momentum.

== Campaign history ==
=== Early years (2015–2017) ===
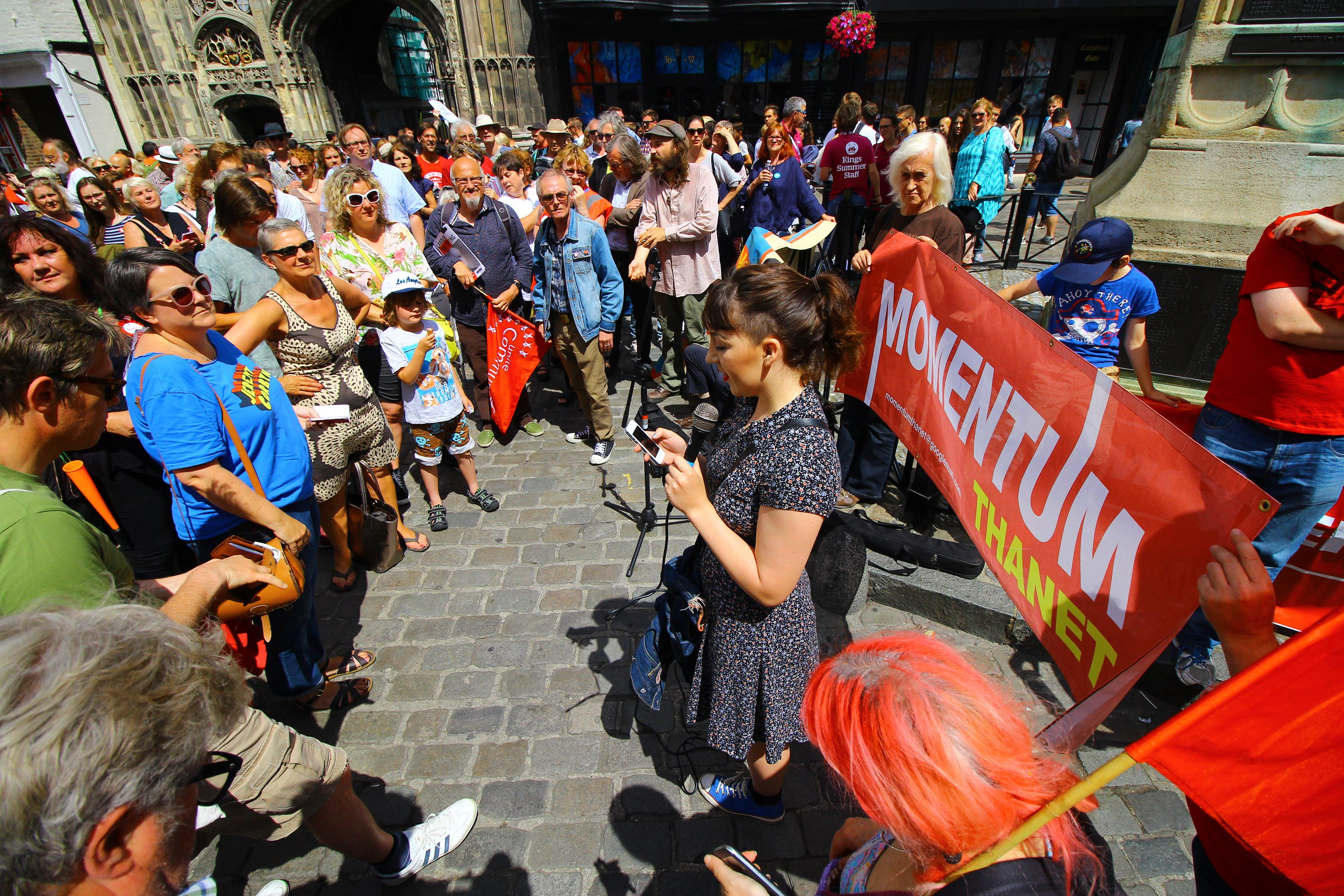

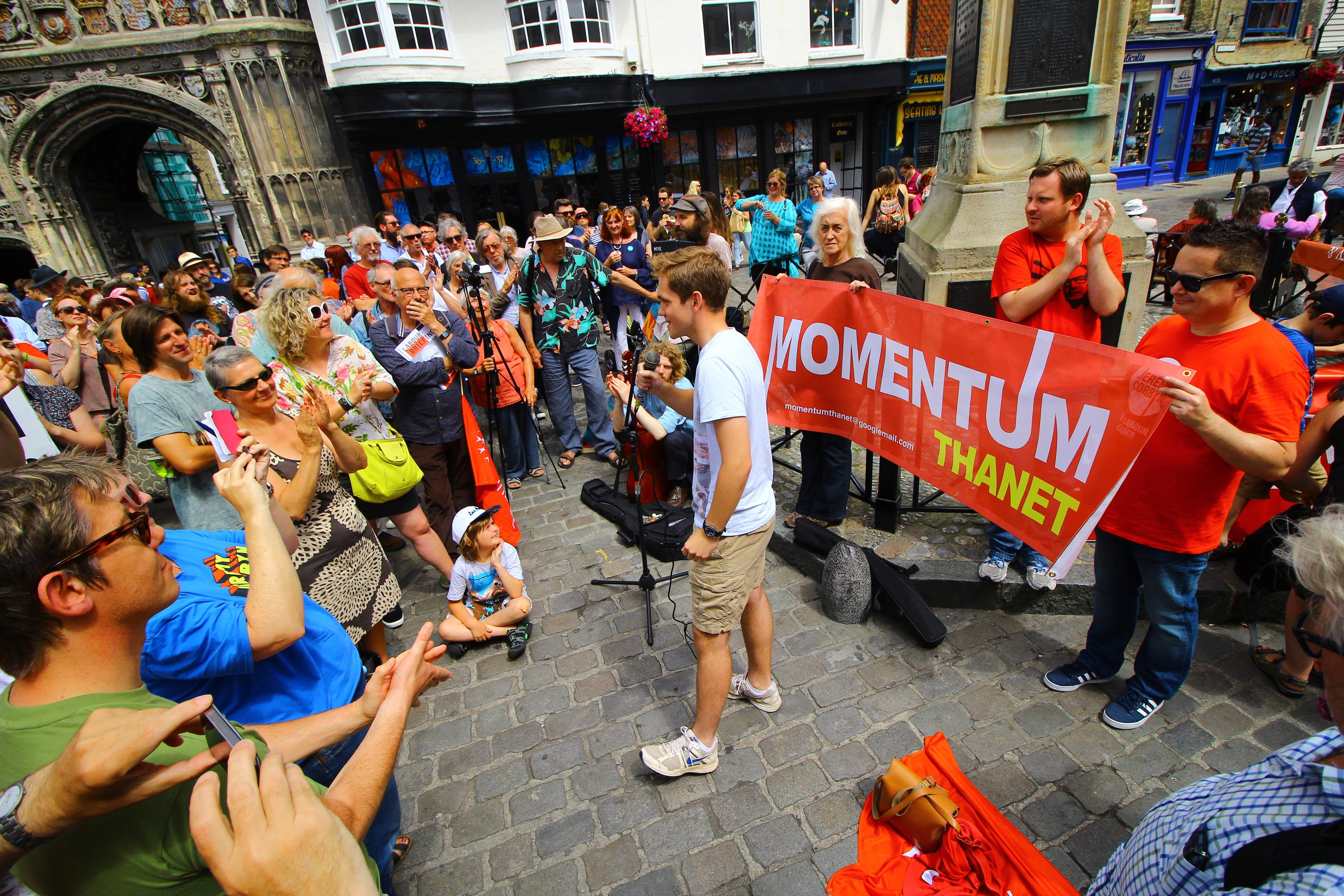
16 July 2016 rally for Corbyn in Canterbury

Momentum began a campaign known as Democracy SOS to address the Conservative-Liberal Democratic government's change to an Individual Electoral Registration system; the Electoral Commission had recommended that the program be implemented a year later than it was. The commission believed, based on 2015 records, that eight million people were eligible to vote but were not registered. 1.9 million registered voters were also removed by the change. Momentum utilized their network to campaign in towns and on university campuses to encourage voter registration.

In 2016, former Labour shadow chancellor John McDonnell praised Momentum for their work in the local elections that May. The organisation coordinated activists from Brighton and London to areas such as Hastings, Crawley and Harlow; activists in the North West were directed to West Lancashire.

Prior to the 2016 United Kingdom European Union membership referendum Momentum declared its support for the UK remaining in the European Union (EU).

After the 2017 Stoke-on-Trent Central and Copeland by-elections were called, Momentum mobilised its activist base to campaign for both. They introduced two technological applications: a phone-banking web application called Grassroots Now (used in Corbyn's 2015 and 2016 Labour-leadership election campaigns), and a carpooling web application to help out-of-town activists travel to campaign events. Stoke-on-Trent Labour Party candidate Gareth Snell won, and Labour candidate Gillian Troughton lost to her Conservative opponent in the traditional Labour stronghold of Copeland.

=== 2017 general election campaign and aftermath ===
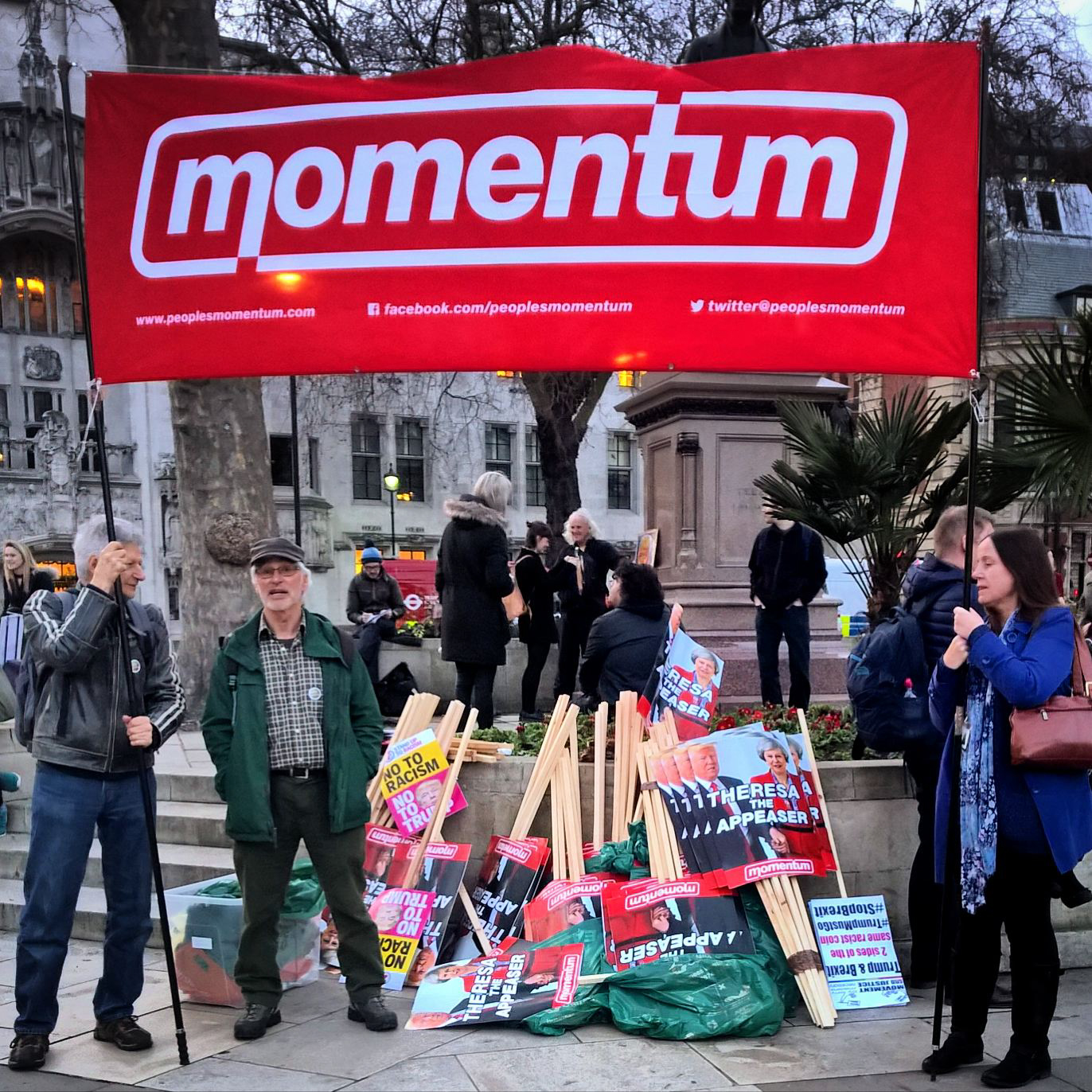
At the February 2017 Stop Trump Rally in London

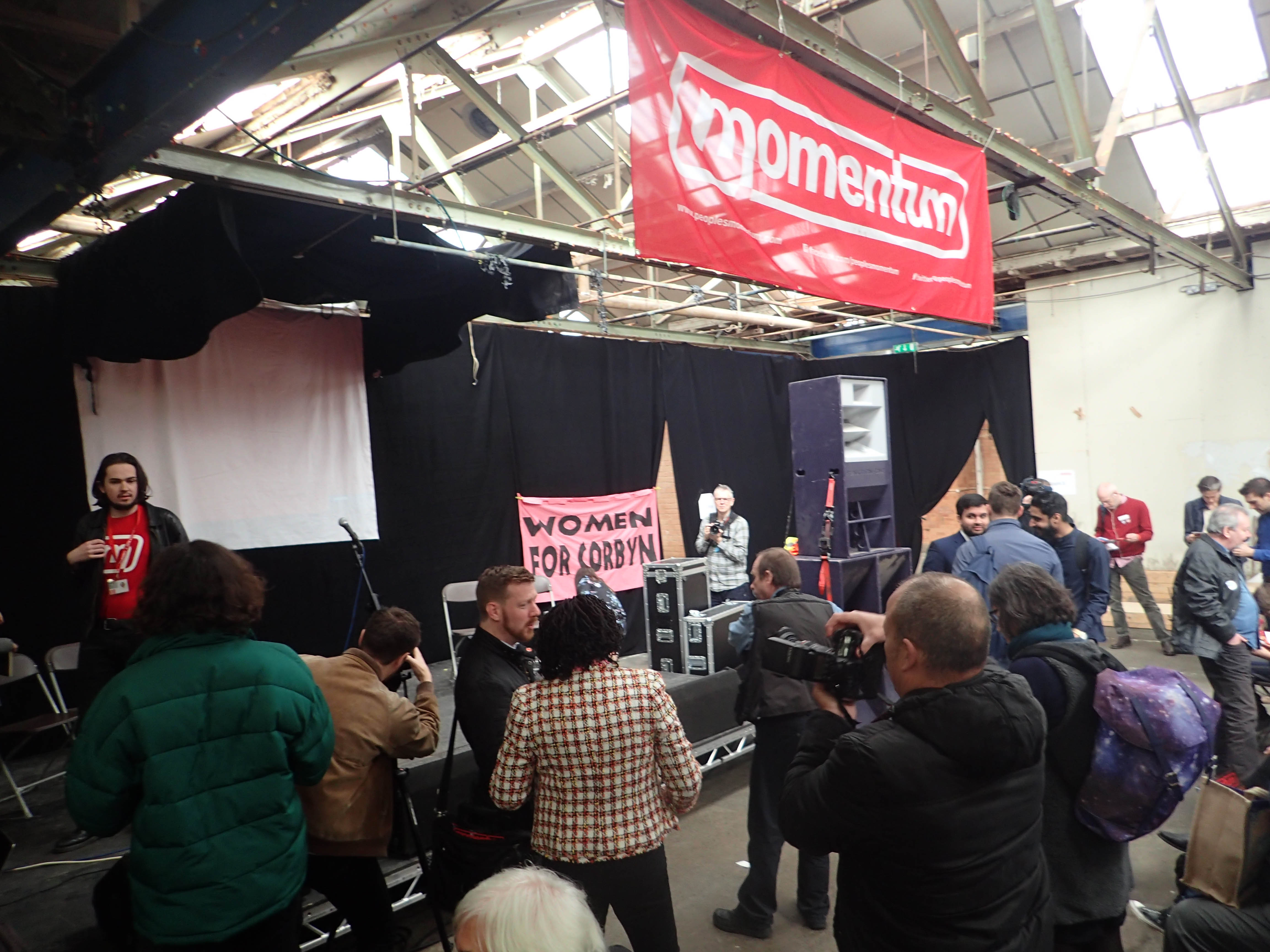
March 2017 Momentum activists' meeting in Birmingham

In the run-up to the 8 June 2017 general election, Momentum worked to mobilise voters and encourage volunteers to canvass on behalf of Labour. Their campaign strategy was to target marginal seats (rather than defend safe ones); their MyNearestMarginal.com website enabled voters to search for campaign events in marginal constituencies closest to them, and voters could promise to volunteer on election day at ElectionDayPledge.com. Momentum worked with organisers from Bernie Sanders' 2016 presidential campaign to hold training sessions for volunteers which included persuasive-conversation training. Senior figures from Sanders' campaign included Erika Uyterhoeven (former national director for outer-state organising), Grayson Lookner, Jeremy Parkin and Kim McMurray.

Momentum had an effective social-media presence, and a number of their low-budget videos went viral. One example was "Daddy, do you hate me?", which was watched by 12.7 million Facebook users (more than one in three of the UK's Facebook users). By the end of the election campaign, Momentum videos had a total of 51 million views.

Membership in the organisation increased by 1,500 within four days of the general election, and by another 3,000 within two months of the election. Momentum's Facebook page had 23.7 million views, and its videos were watched by 12.7 million users. The organisation spent less than £2,000 on Facebook advertisements. In May 2017, Noam Chomsky said that the Labour Party's future of the party lay with the left and Momentum: "The constituency of the Labour Party, the new participants, the Momentum group and so on, [...] if there is to be a serious future for the Labour Party that is where it is in my opinion". On polling day, 10,000 Momentum activists knocked on an estimated 1.2 million doors in the UK.

Although Labour lost five seats to the Conservatives in the general election, the party gained 28 seats from the Tories, six from the Scottish National Party and two from the Lib Dems. Almost every constituency targeted by Momentum was won by Labour. Former Conservative Party director of communications Giles Kenningham said in July 2017, "Labour have used Momentum to devastating effect". Later that month, Conservative MP Michael Gove said: "The Conservative Party can learn a lot from Momentum". In August, it was announced that the Communication Workers Union would affiliate with Momentum after its executive committee voted unanimously to join the organisation. John McTernan, a former critic of the Labour left and Corbyn, joined Momentum that summer. Adam Klug resigned as Momentum national co-ordinator that summer after the snap general election, and national co-ordinator and co-founder Emma Rees resigned in October. Laura Parker, who resigned as Jeremy Corbyn's political secretary before the national conference, replaced Rees as national co-ordinator.

The Electoral Commission (EC) announced in March 2019 that Momentum had been fined £16,700 for multiple breaches of electoral law, including failing to accurately report donations during the general-election period. The fine for not submitting an accurate spending return was the largest imposed on a non-party campaign. Although the organisation was initially investigated by the EC for overspending, the commission found that this was not the case. Momentum national treasurer Puru Miah, a councilor in Tower Hamlets, said that "we have put in place comprehensive systems so we can fully adhere to regulations". An April 2020 Momentum report analysed their performance in the 2017 and 2019 general elections, saying that constituencies such as Broxtowe, Hendon, Morley and Outwood, Southampton Itchen, Pudsey, Thurrock and Harrow East could have been won with the enhanced ground support they had by 2019.

=== Unseat campaign and expansion into local government (2017–2019) ===
Momentum began their Unseat campaign after the 2017 general election with partners like Owen Jones, targeting constituencies where prominent Conservative MPs had a small majority and were susceptible to a Labour win at the next general election. Thousands of people attended Unseat events for seats held by Education Secretary Justine Greening (Putney), Department for Work and Pensions Secretary Iain Duncan Smith (Chingford and Woodford Green) and Prime Minister Boris Johnson (Uxbridge and South Ruislip). The campaign motivated Duncan Smith to contact local Conservative associations to organise activists to conduct counter-campaigns.

Because the Labour Party believed that another snap general election was likely, the party conducted its selection procedure to have a slate of parliamentary candidates in place for the 96 marginal constituencies; Momentum backed several of those candidates. By January 2019, over half of Momentum's 67 selections had become candidates. Momentum wanted the Labour manifesto to propose a four-day work week and a Green New Deal: mass state investment to address climate change.

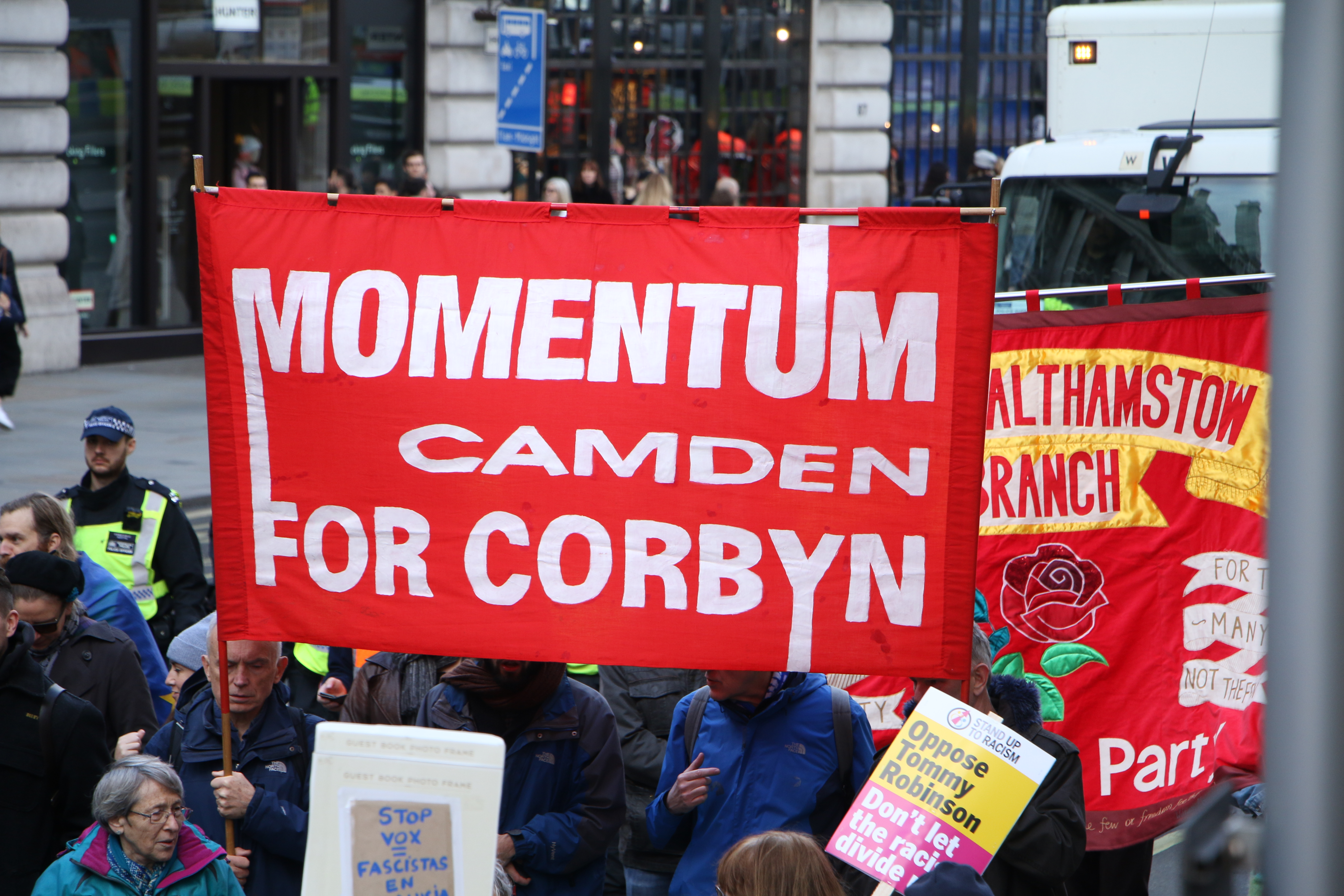
Momentum members in London at a 2018 London anti-fascist rally

Momentum established a candidate network providing support for new councillors and encouraging women to stand, giving them opportunities to discuss policy and training in successful Labour-controlled councils such as Salford and Preston. Momentum-backed selections in the 2018 local elections included Rokhsana Fiaz for Mayor of Newham, who was elected with an increased majority. The Trafford Labour Party leader cited Momentum as a key reason for Labour's gain of seats in the borough. Momentum-supported councillor Joseph Ejiofor became leader of Haringey London Borough Council after the elections in London.

In February 2019, after the resignation of nine Labour members of parliament (eight becoming members of the centrist Independent Group with former Conservatives), Momentum began to organise resources and activists to campaign for those seats, wanting public pressure from constituents to trigger by-elections. The organisation raised £15,000 in the hours after the split to fund the campaign. Momentum organized 100 activists on 19 March in Streatham (Chuka Umunna's constituency), with Owen Jones, Diane Abbott and Ash Sarkar speaking to activists at a rally.

In March 2019, Momentum began Bankrupt Climate Change: a protest campaign outside Barclays banks by 40 local groups. The campaign's objective was to raise awareness of Barclays' investments in fossil-fuel companies; the bank is reportedly Europe's largest financier (and the world's sixth-largest) of such companies.

During the 2019 local elections, Jamie Driscoll was selected as Labour candidate for the inaugural first North of Tyne mayoral election as a notable Momentum-backed choice. Driscoll won the election, with 56.1 per cent of the second-round vote. Brighton and Hove City Council, where Momentum backed 12 Labour candidates, and Sandwell Council were focal points for the organisation.

=== 2019 general election campaign ===
Following the announcement of the 12 December 2019 snap general election, Momentum called for a large mobilisation of Momentum and Labour members. The group increased their number of paid staff from 13 to 56 for the election campaign period. The group set a funding target of £50,000 in 48 hours, however exceeded this and raised £100,000 in 12 hours. Within six days of this funding drive Momentum have raised £255,000 from 10,000 individual donations, averaging at £26 per donation which came close to beating the amount raised during the entirety of the 2017 General election campaign. Within 10 days, the group reached over £300,000 from 11,000 donations. Parker commented on these funds saying the organisation will be able to "scale up every aspect of our operation from the get-go, which will allow us to deliver a campaign like nothing this country has ever seen before.”

Momentum created different tools and initiatives to help activists to organise. Prior to the campaign in September Momentum created a website "Univotes" to help students strategically plan which constituency is better for them to vote in; as students can register at both their home address and student address. The student vote been cited by Momentum as why Labour won in Canterbury, Warwick and Leamington, Portsmouth South, Newcastle-under-Lyme and Lincoln in 2017. They created a website "mycampaignmap.com"- as a successor to the 'My Nearest Marginal' website used for the 2017 election- which helps activists to coordinate their efforts in areas they are most needed. My Campaign Map was used to organise over 21,000 events for the election period, and had over 170,000 unique visitors.

Momentum created a new type of volunteers called "Labour Legends", who took time off from work and commit at least a full week of campaigning in their area, or to volunteer in other constituencies. In 10 days this initiative acquired over 1,000 people have signed up, providing 40,000 volunteer hours, and eventually rising to over 1,400 people getting involved, 500 of which were allocated to marginal seats. Momentum additionally encourages Labour party members abroad in Europe, The United States and Australia to register British expats to vote and to participate in phone banking from where they live. Momentum also created an online forum for the election, the Volunteer Slack, in which volunteers were able to assist with researching issues around the election, phonebanking, texting voters, or helping with video clips. The forum continued after the election and now exists as the "Momentum Community", with over 5,000 members as of August 2021.

The group developed their campaign strategy with three principles in mind, according to Emma Rees: people power, the targeting of marginal seats, and the idea of getting everybody to step up. This was done by following a decentralised model in which activists have both a clear understanding of the aims and taking on organisational roles. Momentum has created several opportunities for activists to get involved in other ways of promotion- these include “Let’s Go” teams who communicate on do phone banking using WhatsApp, volunteers who watch through interviews of Conservative and Liberal Democrat politicians to be used for videos and also people creating videos of themselves explaining why they are voting labour and posting them on social media to help engage with voters on all available platforms.

Momentum used social media advertising to encourage people to register to vote for the election. One of their adverts targeted Urdu speakers. The organising group controversially made a video for Twitter based on a Coca-Cola Christmas advert that circulates every year. They were asked to cease and desist by the Coca-Cola company and the advertisement was taken down. By the end of the election, their videos had a combined viewing of 106 million, double that of the last election.

In 2020, Momentum submitted a report to the Labour party's "Labour Together Review", which was a cross-factional analysis of the party's performance and strategy, making several recommendations on the tools and approach for future elections.

=== Labour leadership elections and socialist organising (2020–2024) ===
Following their defeat in the 2019 general election, in which Labour lost 60 seats, Jeremy Corbyn and Momentum national coordinator Laura Parker resigned. The election loss led Corbyn to call a leadership election, coupled with the deputy leadership election, with the results of both elections announced in April 2020. On 14 January 2020, Momentum ran a two-day online consultation with their members about endorsing Rebecca Long-Bailey for leader and Angela Rayner for deputy leader. The consultation's closed format was controversial. Of the 7,395 members participating, 70 per cent supported Long-Bailey and 52 per cent supported Rayner. Momentum planned hundreds of phone-banking events to support Long-Bailey. Keir Starmer won the election in the first round (with Long-Bailey receiving 28 per cent of the vote), and Momentum failed to win any of the National Executive Committee by-elections. Momentum congratulated Starmer on his victory, and positioned themselves to work with the new leadership for "transformational policies". In May 2020, Momentum founder Jon Lansman announced that he would step down as chairman the following month.

Momentum focused more on grassroots campaigning, since Starmer's election. In the face of a recession due to the COVID-19 pandemic, Momentum organised with ACORN and the London Renters' Union to organise renters to fight eviction and educate them about their tenancy rights. During the lockdown, it was believed that 220,000 private renters fell into arrears and an estimated 60,000 eviction notices were served. Momentum began encouraging their London members and supporters to join the London Renters' Union in May 2020, and the campaign was in full swing by September. To facilitate coordination, Momentum revamped their mycampaignmap website to display local groups, training and events.

In the run-up to the 2021 local elections, the London Labour Party changed its selection process for assembly members so party members select new candidates; four assembly members were not standing for re-election. This was believed to be an opportunity for Momentum, who gained influence in the regional party in the 2018 regional-conference elections to nominate candidates who would push Sadiq Khan's election manifesto to the left. In the member selections, only one Momentum-backed constituency candidate was chosen and the top four London-wide candidates were all from Momentum's slate. Subsequently, only Elly Baker and Sakina Sheikh were elected at the election in May 2021.

In March 2021, the organisation published their 2021–2024 strategy: "Socialist Organising in a New Era". Due to the expulsions of left-wing Labour Party members, Momentum provided legal support to those deemed unjust.

=== 2024 General Election and decline ===
In the run up to the 2024 general election, Momentum was unsuccessful in getting candidates affiliated with their faction selected as prospective Labour parliamentary candidates. Candidates affiliated with Momentum alleged they were being blocked from progressing. Although the group would endorse several sitting Labour MPs to the left of the party in the 2024 election, only one new candidate endorsed by Momentum, Connor Naismith, became a Labour MP.

The organisation voted to continue to focus on organising with the Labour Party in March 2024, preventing members from other parties joining. Despite this, the group has continued to decline, with co-chair Hilary Schan quitting the Labour Party and Momentum in May 2024. Mish Rahman, former Momentum member of Labour's National Executive Committee, left the party to join the Green Party in April 2025. The decision of former Labour leader Jeremy Corbyn is create a new socialist political party, Your Party, and the rise in support for Zack Polanski's "eco-socialist" vision for the Green Party have both led to left wing organisers within Labour to leave.

== Organising within the Labour Party ==
=== Reselection of MPs ===
Critics of Corbyn in the Parliamentary Labour Party have raised concerns that Momentum might encourage the deselection of MPs and councillors who disagree with the organisation, in a process known as reselection. The concern was amplified by prominent left-wing voices unaffiliated with Momentum. Momentum denied the accusation in 2015, saying: "We will not campaign for the deselection of any MP and will not permit any local Momentum groups to do so. The selection of candidates is entirely a matter for local party members and rightly so". The organization is supportive of open selections, however, in which all members (not just socialist societies and trade unions) have an equal influence on the selection process and are democratically accountable. In July 2018, Momentum national coordinator Laura Parker said that four Labour MPs who voted against an opposition amendment to the EU withdrawal bill should be deselected. At the Labour Party Conference that year, the organisation's reselection reforms were supported by Corbyn. In July 2019, Momentum announced they would support Labour and Momentum members who wanted to challenge sitting Labour MPs to encourage a younger, more working class and ethnically diverse pool of party representatives. Research indicates that candidates selected during this period were more likely to be aligned to the party's 'progressive' faction.

=== Labour Party democracy review (2017) ===
In 2017, the Labour Party began a democracy review which would give its membership greater voting capabilities. Momentum has advocated greater membership involvement in party decision-making and "bolder reforms", such as Labour members having a larger role in policy development. Momentum has pushed for lowering of the nomination threshold for Labour leadership candidates, so a left-wing successor to Corbyn could more easily contest a future election. Jon Lansman, however, called the proposed Labour reforms "tinkering around the edges".

Momentum tabled plans to update the selection of BAME Labour representatives, in which a one member, one vote election would replace a small-group decision. Under the Momentum plan, all Black or other-minority party members would automatically become part of BAME Labour and have a one-member, one-vote right to elect their NEC representative. BAME Labour would be an independent organisation, with its committee having direct access to its membership list and centrally-funded finances and the ability to independently organise its own campaigns and events.

Crucial votes about the democracy review took place during the 2017 Labour Party Conference in Brighton. Momentum launched M.app, a smartphone app to alert delegates to key votes on the conference floor and send real-time information about events and rallies. Although a compromise motion lowering the threshold for local party and union branches to express dissatisfaction with an MP's performance from 50 to 33 per cent passed, it was announced that the democracy review was being shelved.

=== Internal elections in the Labour Party ===
In the 2016 elections for the National Executive Committee, it emerged that Momentum, the Campaign for Labour Party Democracy and other leftist groups had formed a joint slate under the Centre-Left Grassroots Alliance (CLGA), and were backing six representatives for the NEC: Rhea Wolfson, former chair of the Oxford University Jewish Society who replaced Ken Livingstone; Christine Shawcroft, a senior Momentum figure who had been an NEC member for fifteen years and was briefly suspended from the party after defending Lutfur Rahman (gaining media attention for jocular comments about dialogue with ISIS instead of air strikes); Peter Willsman; Claudia Webbe; Ann Black, and Darren Williams. All six candidates were elected.

In 2017, Momentum and the Campaign for Socialism (their Scottish sister organisation) won five of the eight seats on the Scottish Labour executive committee. At that year's Labour conference, it was announced that the party would add three more member-elected positions on the NEC in response to a significant rise in membership. During the balloting period, Peter Willsman was removed from Momentum's list of recommended candidates after an allegation of antisemitism; Willsman had been recorded as describing some Jewish critics of Labour as "Trump fanatics". Three other Momentum-backed candidates were elected to the NEC: Jon Lansman, Yasmine Dar and Rachel Garnham.

In April 2020, three NEC elections were held alongside the 2020 Labour leadership election: two for casual vacancies, and one for a newly created BAME position. None of Momentum's nominated candidates were successful.

Labour's voting system for the elections of CLP reps to the NEC was changed from first-past-the-post to STV in 2020, a move supporters said they hoped would reduce factionalism. As a result, the alliance agreed on a Grassroots Voice slate in July 2020 of six candidates for nine Constituency Labour Party seats in the October election. Four hundred and fifty CLPs participated, the highest turnout in Labour history; forty-two per cent of the selection nominations went to the Grassroots Voice slate. Five out of six candidates were elected from the slate. As well as Momentum winning a majority of seats on Young Labour's National Executive.

In 2021, all four of Momentum's backed candidates for the newly created National Women's Committee were elected (Solma Ahmed, Ekua Bayunu, Tricia Duncan and Chloe Hopkins)- with the further two positions being other left-wing candidates from the CLGA; Momentum lost control of the London REC in a hastily organised conference; and three out of four of Momentum's backed candidates in Young Labour's new equalities roles were won In 2022, Momentum and Campaign for Socialism endorsed Coll McCail and Lauren Harper as youth reps on the Scottish Executive Committee.

In the 2024 NEC elections, three CLGA candidates were elected for the nine available seats, a loss of one seat. Labour to Win, the coalition of Labour's right, won four and noted that this was the first time in two decades that the organised right wing slate had won more of the CLP representative seats than the left faction.

== Other issues ==
=== Austerity ===
One of Momentum's primary objectives was to create an anti-austerity movement in the UK which was connected to the Labour Party. In particular, Momentum criticised George Osborne's proposal to cut tax credit payments for working families. In 2016, local Momentum groups began to collect and volunteer for food banks.

=== Antisemitism allegations ===
Since 2015, there have been a series of allegations of antisemitism against Labour Party members. Many past and current leading figures in Momentum were or are Jewish (or of Jewish ancestry), such as Klug, Lansman, Schneider, Rhea Wolfson and Jackie Walker. Momentum accepts the existence of antisemitism in the party and acknowledges that action must be taken to combat this, although some members of the group have been accused of antisemitism themselves. Lansman attributed the antisemitism to "conspiracy theorists" in the party and the organisation, and Momentum has challenged the conspiracy theories with viral videos.

Walker, Momentum's vice-chair, was expelled from the Labour Party for behaviour related to antisemitism. Joshua Garfield, a Jewish youth officer in a London Momentum branch, resigned in April 2018 because antisemitism by branch members made him feel "sometimes unsafe and certainly untrusted". Garfield was a member (and, later, an officer) of the Jewish Labour Movement who appeared on a Panorama episode about antisemitism in the Labour Party. In the 2018 National Executive Committee elections, Momentum withdrew their support for Peter Willsman after an NEC meeting in which he described those "lecturing" the party about antisemitism as "Trump fanatics" who were "making up duff information without any evidence at all".

In early 2020, two Momentum-backed Labour councillors in Brighton were suspended pending an investigation after accusations of antisemitism; the Green Party then led the minority administration. In response to Jeremy Corbyn's suspension from the Labour Party after the antisemitism report, Momentum and other left-wing groups passed motions of solidarity with him; some of the motions indicated a vote of no confidence in leader Starmer and general secretary David Evans. This led to 50 suspensions, including seven from the Momentum-affiliated Welsh Labour Grassroots.

=== Brexit ===
Momentum supported remain in the 2016 UK EU referendum.

Following the 2016 UK EU referendum, Momentum declined to take a formal position in the Brexit debate and supported the Labour Party position. Several Momentum members have supported a second referendum, however, with remaining and the government's deal as options. The People's Vote advocacy group, which included trade-union leaders and former Momentum members, was launched in April 2018. The group's launch statement was signed by TSSA union general secretary Manuel Cortes, economist Ann Pettifor, former Momentum steering group member Michael Chessum and former CWU general secretary Billy Hayes. A November 2018 poll of Momentum members found that a majority supported a second referendum. The left-wing, pro-European pressure group Another Europe Is Possible contains Momentum members such as former steering-committee member Michael Chessum. In March 2019, 188 Momentum activists sent an open letter to Jon Lansman supporting a second referendum.

=== Civil rights ===
In 2021 and 2022 Momentum organised politically against the Covert Human Intelligence Act and the Police, Crime, Sentencing and Courts Bill (PCSC) by building connections between socialist MPs and social movements and supporting demonstrations and lobbying. In March 2021, then Momentum co-chairs Andrew and Gaya signed a Greenpeace open letter alongside other social movements opposing the PCSC Bill.

=== Immigration and refuge in the UK ===
Momentum has been supportive of refugees attempting to claim asylum in the United Kingdom. In August 2020, the organisation criticised Labour leader Keir Starmer's lack of support for those crossing the English Channel to claim asylum in the UK. Their condemnation was coordinated with Open Labour and the Labour Campaign for Free Movement.

=== 2015 Syria airstrikes ===
Momentum called for its membership to lobby Labour MPs "to support Corbyn, not Cameron, over Syria" on Twitter, linking to the Stop the War Coalition's Don't Bomb Syria campaign which opposed the Conservative government's proposal to extend its bombing sorties against Daesh (also known as ISIS) from Daesh-held territory in Iraq to Daesh-held territory in Syria. Corbyn had argued that Cameron's government lacked a credible plan for defeating Daesh, and the bombing in Syria would not increase the United Kingdom's national security; he has also said that military action should always be a last resort. Some Labour MPs criticised Momentum's move to lobby on party-political grounds before the Labour Party's position on military action had been decided; Gavin Shuker asked, "Who decided this was your position on Syria, and to lobby MPs in this way?"

=== 2022 Russian invasion of Ukraine ===
In February 2022, Russia initiated a full-scale invasion of Ukraine and a week prior to the invasion 11 current Labour MPs belonging to the party's left and two independent MPs signed an open letter from the Stop the War Coalition condemning NATO and the UK government for increasing tensions prior to the event. The Labour leadership under Keir Starmer threatened the MPs with expulsion and they rescinded their support. Momentum then condemned the party leadership for using the war, in their opinion, as a tool for punishing the left.

== The World Transformed ==
In 2016, Momentum began The World Transformed (TWT): an annual four-day festival at the same time as the Labour Party conference which features art, music, culture and political discussions. Although Momentum originally organised the festival, it became an independent entity with close ties to the group. In 2020, the festival became online-only and spread across a month in response to the COVID-19 pandemic and returned to a physical festival in 2021, with additional online access.

The festival has featured several international politicians present in different talks, such as: 2017 French presidential candidate Jean-Luc Mélenchon, leader of the German Die Linke party Katja Kipping and leader of the Tanzanian Alliance for Change and Transparency party Zitto Kabwe (in 2018), US Democratic Congresswomen Ilhan Omar (in 2020), and US independent Senator Bernie Sanders (in 2021).

After the 2018 World Transformed event, local one- and multi-day festivals not organised by Momentum or TWT began to emerge.

== See also ==
- List of organisations associated with the Labour Party (UK)
- Novara Media
- Militant tendency, a socialist organisation that was associated with the Labour Party, disbanded in 1991
- Socialist Campaign Group, MP grouping containing most Momentum supporting MPs
- Tribune
