= Allergy UK =

British medical charity

- Founded: 1991
- Location(s): Crayford, DA1; United Kingdom
- Key people: Simone Miles, CEO
- Revenue: £1,650,535 (2022)
- Staff: 23 (2022)
- Website: Official Website

Allergy UK, formally The British Allergy Foundation, is a British medical charity dedicated to helping adults and children with allergies. The charity was founded in 1991, and in 2002 the operational name of the charity became Allergy UK.

== Approved Products ==
The charity, through its commercial arm Allergy Research Ltd, endorses products that "may help make life more comfortable for people living with allergy". Only products that meet the organisation's "scientific or clinical protocols" are given the "Allergy UK Seal of Approval". These products span many categories, from fabrics and flooring to cosmetics, detergents and electrical appliances.

== National lobbying ==
Allergy UK is a founding member of the National Allergy Strategy Group, a coalition of charities, professional organisations and industry, that seeks to improve health services for people with allergies in the UK.

== See also ==
- Allergy
