= Labour Co-ordinating Committee =

The Labour Co-ordinating Committee (LCC) was a faction in the British Labour Party, established in 1978 and wound-up in 1998. It moved from a group established to challenge the leadership of the party from the left to the vanguard of Tony Blair's drive to modernise the party's organisation and policies.

The LCC was established in 1978 to co-ordinate the efforts of the Labour left. As such it was extremely broad including, for instance, members of the Campaign for Labour Party Democracy, Labour Briefing, and the fiercely anti-Trotskyist National Organisation of Labour Students (NOLS).

In 1981, the LCC supported the campaign of Tony Benn against Denis Healey for the deputy leadership of the party, but many were deeply unhappy with Benn's campaign and approach and the LCC began to evolve into a body aiming to rescue the party from the mess it found itself in as the SDP split and Benn's campaign imprinted an image of extremism in the minds of the voters.

The anti-Trotskyism of NOLS was central to this period as they were able to successfully outmanoeuvre the far-left groups, having developed their skills in the bitter struggle of the Clause Four Group with Militant in the student movement.

In 1983, the LCC organised a conference, After the Landslide, to examine the lessons from the party's catastrophic defeat of that year: the tone the conference set, that organisational and political modernisation and change were essential, was to become the dominant theme in the party's internal life in the following decade. Robin Cook became the LCC's principal voice in parliament and Peter Hain was a prominent voice outside Westminster. Cherie Blair was also an active member, serving on the LCC executive. Harriet Harman was also a key member.

Under Neil Kinnock's leadership the LCC became fully engaged in the struggle against Militant and the LCC was broadly supportive of the leadership, though it backed John Prescott's unsuccessful 1988 challenge to deputy leader Roy Hattersley.

The defeat of Militant left the group without a real cause and membership began to decline, although it sponsored the launch of a new discussion journal, Renewal, in 1993 and firmly repositioned itself as a group of modernisers rather than on the soft left.

In 1998, with New Labour now in power, the LCC voted to wind itself up.
