= Alex Sobel =

British politician (born 1975)

Alex Sobel MP
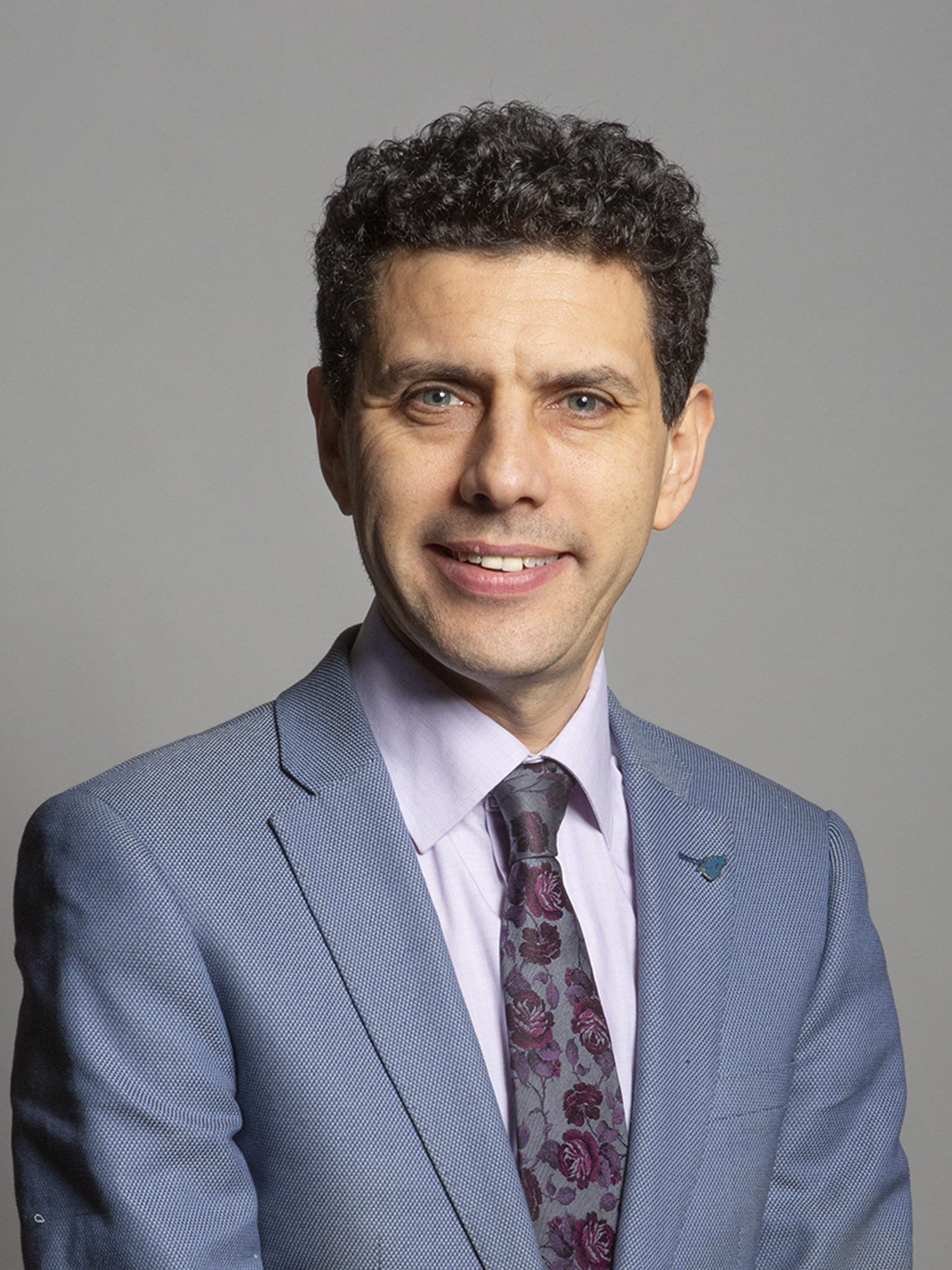
- Official portrait, 2019

Shadow Minister for Nature Recovery and the Domestic Environment
- In office 4 December 2021 – 5 September 2023
- Leader: Keir Starmer
- Preceded by: Olivia Blake
- Succeeded by: Office abolished

Shadow Minister for Tourism and Heritage
- In office 9 April 2020 – 4 December 2021
- Leader: Keir Starmer
- Preceded by: Kevin Brennan
- Succeeded by: Jeff Smith

Member of Parliament for Leeds Central and Headingley
- Incumbent
- Assumed office 4 July 2024
- Preceded by: Constituency established
- Majority: 8,422 (26.7%)

Member of Parliament for Leeds North West
- In office 8 June 2017 – 30 May 2024
- Preceded by: Greg Mulholland
- Succeeded by: Katie White

Member of Leeds City Council for Moortown
- In office 3 May 2012 – 3 May 2018
- Preceded by: Mark Harris
- Succeeded by: Mohammed Shahzad

Chair of the Joint Committee on Human Rights
- Incumbent
- Assumed office 9 September 2026
- Preceded by: David Alton

Personal details
- Born: Alexander David Sobel; 26 April 1975 (age 51) Leeds, England
- Party: Labour Co-op
- Education: University of Leeds
- Website: alexsobel.co.uk

Alexander David Sobel (born 26 April 1975) is a British Labour and Co-operative politician who has served as the Member of Parliament (MP) for Leeds Central and Headingley, previously Leeds North West, since 2017. He served as Shadow Minister for Nature Recovery and the Domestic Environment from 2021 to 2023.

== Early life and career ==
Alexander Sobel was born on 26 April 1975 in Hyde Park, Leeds, to parents who came to England from Israel in 1971. He grew up in Beaconsfield, attending Holtspur Middle School and John Hampden Grammar School. As a teenager, he joined anti-fascist and environmental protests in Leeds. He is Jewish.

After graduating in information systems at the University of Leeds in 1997, Sobel worked with social enterprises, and ran the regional body Social Enterprise Yorkshire and the Humber from 2009 until 2017.

== Political career ==
Sobel joined the Labour Party in 1997.

After standing unsuccessfully in four Leeds City Council elections between 2002 and 2007, he was elected as a Labour councillor for the Moortown ward in the 2012 council election, and was re-elected in the 2016 council election. He led the council's work on air pollution and climate change.

In December 2015, Sobel co-founded the activist group Open Labour.

== Parliamentary career ==
At the 2005 general election, Sobel stood as the Labour candidate in Beaconsfield, coming third with 19.4% of the vote behind the incumbent Conservative MP Dominic Grieve and the Liberal Democrat candidate.

At the 2015 general election, Sobel stood in Leeds North West, coming second with 30.1% of the vote behind the incumbent Liberal Democrat MP Greg Mulholland. During the election, Sobel and the Leeds North West Labour Party were required to publish an apology leaflet and pay legal costs after falsely claiming that the incumbent Liberal Democrat MP Greg Mulholland voted for the Academies Act 2010.

Sobel was elected to Parliament as MP for Leeds North West at the snap 2017 general election with 44.1% of the vote and a majority of 4,224.

In October 2017, Sobel was elected as one of the officers of the All-party parliamentary group on rare, genetic and undiagnosed conditions.

On 15 March 2019, Sobel supported Youth Strike for Climate, speaking at one of their school strikes, also praising Leeds City Council's decision to declare a Climate Emergency, saying "We will be the biggest council in the country to have declared a climate emergency. Nearly 800,000 people live in our great city".

In October 2019 Sobel openly supported and spoke at an Extinction Rebellion occupation of Westminster, London despite warnings by the Met Police he could be arrested if he did so. Sobel stated that he was protesting outside Parliament because the Government had not declared a climate emergency or met Extinction Rebellion's demands, emphasising the urgent need for action to reduce emissions and prevent severe climate consequences. He stressed the importance of building public and parliamentary pressure for meaningful change.

At the 2019 general election, Sobel was re-elected as MP for Leeds North West with an increased vote share of 48.6% and an increased majority of 10,749.

In December 2019, he formed an All-Party Parliamentary Group aiming to reduce carbon emissions to net zero as early as possible.

In January 2020, Sobel apologised after receiving criticism for meeting with the director of Population Matters, a controversial human population control charity.

In April 2020, Sobel became shadow minister for arts, heritage and tourism.

In March 2021, Sobel wrote a letter to Robert Jenrick, the Secretary of State for Housing, Communities and Local Government, on behalf of Group for Action on Leeds Bradford Airport (GALBA). In the letter he urged the UK Government to review the approval of Leeds Bradford Airport's expansion, arguing that it conflicted with national carbon reduction targets. He believed such significant decisions should be made nationally, not by a small local panel.

In December 2021, Sobel became Shadow Minister for Nature Recovery and the Domestic Environment. He left the position in the 2023 British shadow cabinet reshuffle.

In July 2023 the New Statesman named Sobel within a small list of Labour MPs who understand climate change. In this article he was described by Richard Benwell as having a "Hermione Granger-style time-turner because he is indefatigable in turning up to almost every environment event".

Following the 2023 review of Westminster constituencies, the Headingley and Weetwood wards of the Leeds North West constituency were moved into the newly created constituency of Leeds Central and Headingley. At the 2024 general election, Sobel was elected to Parliament as MP for Leeds Central and Headingley with 50.2% of the vote and a majority of 8,422 over the second-placed Green Party candidate. There were eight candidates, and a turnout of 45%. The result was described as "Labour Hold" because the notional 2019 result for the new seat was a win for Labour.

Sobel has sat on the Joint Committee on Human Rights since November 2024, and chaired it since September 2026.

== Personal life ==
Sobel is separated, with two sons and lives in Leeds. In Who's Who in 2025 he lists his recreations as "attending Indie gigs, running, cycling, video games, going to the gym".

Parliament of the United Kingdom
Preceded by Greg Mulholland	Member of Parliament for Leeds North West; 2017–2024	Succeeded by Katie White
Preceded by New seat	Member of Parliament for Leeds Central and Headingley; 2024–present	Incumbent
