= Leeds Central and Headingley =

UK Parliament constituency (since 2024)

Coordinates: 53.82°N 1.58°W

- Borough constituency for the House of Commons
- Interactive map of boundaries since 2024
- Boundary within Yorkshire and the Humber
- County: West Yorkshire

Current constituency
- Created: 2024
- Member of Parliament: Alex Sobel (Labour)
- Seats: One
- Created from: Leeds Central, Leeds North West, and Leeds West

Leeds Central and Headingley is a constituency (Note: A borough constituency (for the purposes of election expenses and type of returning officer)) (Note: As with all constituencies, the constituency elects one Member of Parliament (MP) by the first past the post system of election at least every five years.) of the House of Commons in the UK Parliament. Further to the completion of the 2023 review of Westminster constituencies, it was first contested in the 2024 general election. The seat is currently represented by Alex Sobel of the Labour Party, who served as MP for Leeds North West from 2017 to 2024.

== Constituency profile ==
Leeds Central and Headingley is an urban constituency in West Yorkshire. It is located in the city of Leeds and contains its central and north-western neighbourhoods, including Leeds city centre, Headingley, Little London, Burley, Hawksworth and Tinshill. Leeds is one of the United Kingdom's largest cities and grew rapidly during the Industrial Revolution as a centre for textile manufacturing, especially wool. Today the city has a diverse economy and is the largest legal and financial centre in England outside of London. This constituency has one of the largest student populations of any constituency in the United Kingdom as the site of two universities, the University of Leeds and Leeds Beckett University, which together have almost 70,000 students. The constituency has average levels of wealth; there is some deprivation in Hawksworth whilst Headingly is generally affluent and suburban in character. The average house price is lower than the national average but higher than the rest of Yorkshire.

In general, residents of Leeds Central and Headingley are very young and well-educated. Compared to the rest of the country, they are unlikely to be homeowners or married, and are mostly irreligious. They have average levels of income, and a high proportion work in the health and education sectors and in professional or scientific occupations. White people made up 71% of the population at the 2021 census. Asians were 13% of residents, including a large Chinese community, and Black people were 6%. At the local city council, almost all seats in the constituency are represented by the Labour Party. Voters strongly supported remaining in the European Union in the 2016 referendum; an estimated 67% voted to remain compared to the nationwide figure of 48%.

== Boundaries ==
The constituency is composed of the following electoral wards of the City of Leeds:

- Headingley & Hyde Park, Kirkstall, Little London & Woodhouse, and Weetwood.

It comprises the following areas of the City of Leeds:

- Headingley and Weetwood, transferred from Leeds North West
- Hyde Park, Little London and Woodhouse from Leeds Central (abolished and largely replaced by Leeds South)
- Kirkstall from Leeds West (abolished)

== Members of Parliament ==
Leeds Central and Leeds North West prior to 2024

Election	Member	Party
2024	Alex Sobel	Labour Co-op

== Elections ==
=== Elections in the 2020s ===
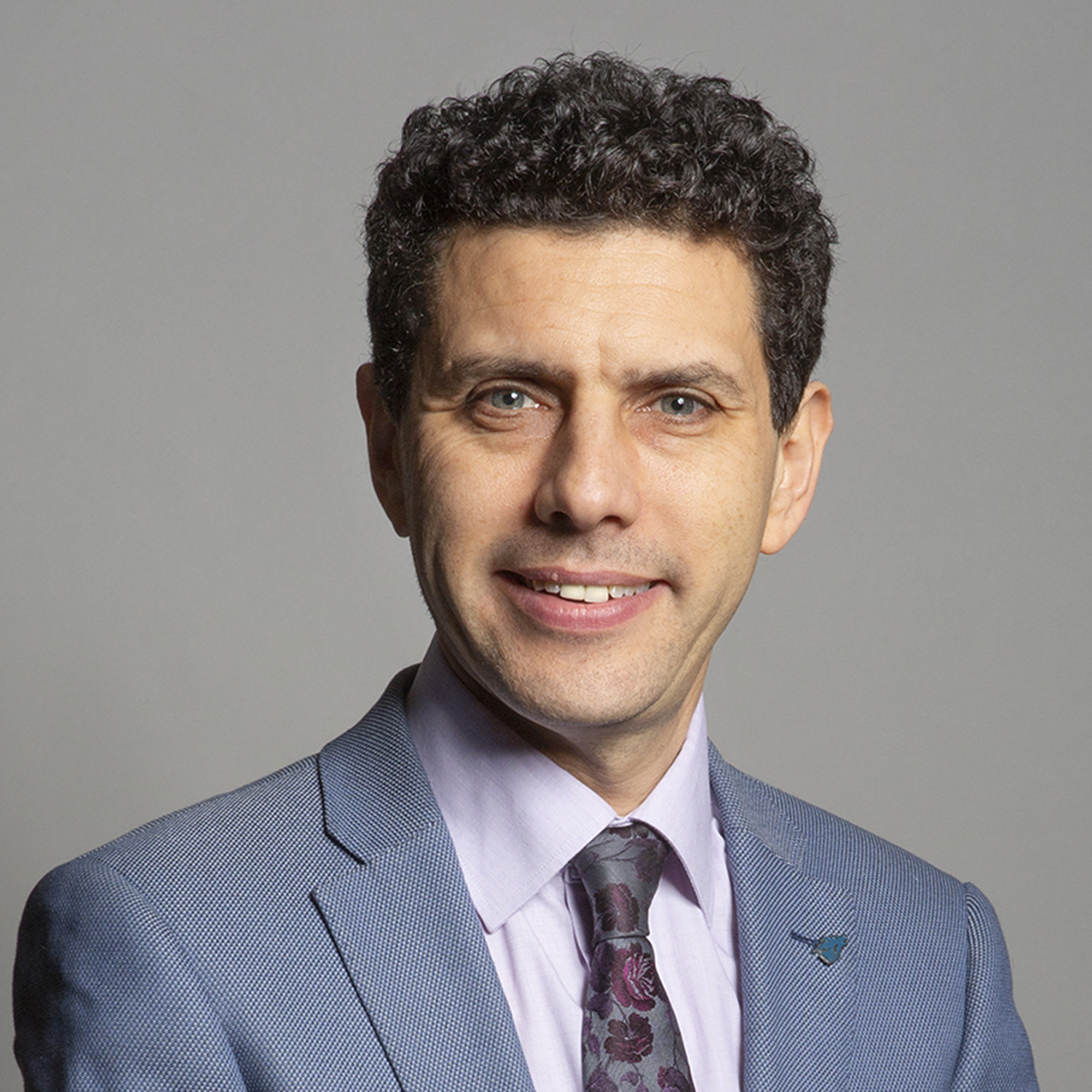
Alex Sobel, Member of Parliament for Leeds Central and Headingley since 2024

General election 2024: Leeds Central and Headingley
Party	Candidate	Votes	%	±%
Labour Co-op	Alex Sobel	15,853	50.2	−13.2
Green	Chris Foren	7,431	23.5	+20.0
Liberal Democrats	Chris Howley	2,611	8.3	−2.9
Reform	Reggie Wray	2,399	7.6	+3.6
Conservative	Jenny Jackson	2,237	7.1	−10.8
Workers Party	Owais Rajput	691	2.2	N/A
SDP	Rob Walker	187	0.6	N/A
TUSC	Louie George Fulton	186	0.6	N/A
Majority		8,422	26.7	−18.8
Turnout		31,595	44.8	−13.1
Registered electors		70,554		
Labour hold		Swing	−16.6	

=== Elections in the 2010s ===
2019 notional result
Party	Vote	%
Labour	27,696	63.4
Conservative	7,817	17.9
Liberal Democrats	4,884	11.2
Brexit Party	1,757	4.0
Green	1,508	3.5
Turnout	43,662	57.9
Electorate	75,396	

== See also ==
- parliamentary constituencies in West Yorkshire
- List of parliamentary constituencies in the Yorkshire and the Humber (region)
