= Karie Murphy =

British trade unionist and political strategist

Executive Director of the Office of the Leader of the Opposition
- In office 12 February 2016 – 4 April 2020
- Leader: Jeremy Corbyn
- Preceded by: Simon Fletcher
- Succeeded by: Morgan McSweeney

Personal details
- Born: Karie Murphy; February 1964 (age 62)
- Party: Labour
- Profession: Nurse; trade unionist; political strategist

Karie Murphy (born February 1964) is a British trade unionist and political strategist who served as the chief of staff to Leader of the Opposition Jeremy Corbyn and as the executive director of his office from 2016 to 2019, and was the Labour Party's acting general secretary in 2019. She has been a co-director of the left-wing political organisation Collective since 2025.

== Career ==
=== Early career ===
Murphy was a nurse in Glasgow for 25 years; she entered trade union politics as a Unison representative. From around 1996, she served as the secretary of Unison's Glasgow Community Health branch. Following the 2004 audit and 2005 suspension of the branch, Murphy was charged with "serious financial irregularities" by Unison in June 2006, hired Mishcon de Reya to represent her in the resulting legal dispute, and quit the union four months later.

In 2006, she became a member of the Scottish Executive and chaired Scottish Labour from that year onwards, before joining Unite the Union.

During Ed Miliband's leadership of the Labour Party (2010–2015), Murphy managed the office of Tom Watson, Labour Party's MP for West Bromwich East.

She has sought nomination as a Labour Party parliamentary candidate several times. In 2013, the selection process for Falkirk led to a party inquiry into accusations of vote-rigging by Unite the Union and led to Tom Watson's resignation as national campaign co-ordinator. Murphy, whose candidature had been promoted by Len McCluskey, was cleared of any wrongdoing and reinstated to the party but withdrew from the contest after emerging as a frontrunner. Mishcon de Reya handled her communications with the press, allegedly as part of legal aid provided by Unite. According to The Times, the dispute "prompted Ed Miliband to rewrite the rules for how Labour elects leaders, paving the way for Jeremy Corbyn". Murphy's candidacy for the 2015 general election in Halifax was rejected by deputy leader Harriet Harman's party selection panel, which emphasised its support for regional candidates.

=== Chief of staff to Leader of the Opposition ===
In February 2016, Murphy was appointed executive director of the Leader's Office, under Jeremy Corbyn. She was subsequently chosen by Corbyn as his chief of staff. Along with Seumas Milne, Andrew Murray and McCluskey, she has been identified as one of the "Four Ms" who it is claimed had significant influence on Corbyn's leadership of the Labour Party. She was reported to have fallen out with deputy leader Tom Watson, her former employer, over her loyalty to Corbyn.

In the 2017 general election, it was the Labour leadership's office team, led by Murphy, that was credited with the foresight to approach the poll in ways barely understood by most media commentators at the time, resulting in a hung parliament. Among the team, Murphy was reported as having come closest to predicting the result. She had declined the offer of undergoing selection to become a parliamentary candidate.

In 2018, Murphy proposed in writing a series of conciliatory measures to repair Corbyn's relationship with the mainstream British Jewish community, only one of which was implemented.

After having been credited with engineering the resignation of Iain McNicol as Labour's general secretary in 2018, in April 2019 Murphy stepped in to replace Jennie Formby, who entered cancer treatment, in the role. In October 2019, following her alleged involvement (alongside Jon Lansman and Len McCluskey) in a failed attempt to abolish Tom Watson's post as deputy leader over his stance on Brexit and in the resignation of Labour's policy director Andrew Fisher, Murphy was removed from the Leader's Office and seconded to Labour head office to oversee the forthcoming general election campaign. Labour sources attributed Murphy's dismissal to John McDonnell, who had opposed Murphy's unambiguous rejection of a second Brexit referendum and regretted the departure of Fisher. Both McDonnell and Diane Abbott had called for Corbyn to remove Murphy and her protégé Seumas Milne from their key positions at the leader's office.

=== Campaign strategist and senior aide ===
Following the 2019 general election, which saw Labour achieve its fewest seats since the 1935 election despite garnering 10,269,051 votes, some attributed the defeat to Murphy's strategic approach. She had reportedly told advisors that the election was to be "a full-on assault" and that "every single seat is there for the battle." The Sunday Times leaked a list of target seats on 19 January which included Stourbridge (Con majority 7,654), Dover (6,437) and Gloucester (5,520). Sources in The Times newspaper criticised the failure to provide resources to internal Corbyn critics such as Ruth Smeeth, Mary Creagh, and Melanie Onn, as well as the decision to target seats such as Finchley and Golders Green where former Labour MP Luciana Berger was running, and Plaid Cymru-held Arfon instead of Conservative-Labour marginals in nearby Aberconwy and Clwyd West. The Times claimed it had spoken to some senior figures in the Labour Party who felt Murphy approached the contest with a "deranged optimism" after the 2017 election, while others felt that she and McCluskey had been driven by a desire to "prove wrong" pro-EU MPs such as Keir Starmer and Emily Thornberry.

Despite the result of the election, Murphy was named by Corbyn in his dissolution honours list. The Guardian reported "some [Labour Party] members were infuriated by the news". Labour Deputy Leader candidate Rosena Allin-Khan stated that "anyone being investigated by the EHRC (should not) be recommended for a peerage". In June 2020, it was reported that Murphy's peerage had been blocked by the House of Lords Appointments Commission and subsequently her name did not appear on the list of confirmed peerages in August 2020.

Murphy's plans for a major re-organisation of the party's analytics team and regional organising structures ahead of Corbyn's departure as Labour leader, drawn jointly with Jennie Formby, were thwarted by early January 2020 by opposition from the Unite and GMB trade unions and from all the party leadership candidates. Around the time of his leadership election win in early April 2020, Keir Starmer was reported to intend a dismissal of Murphy and Formby in the first weeks after his victory. Murphy remained a "senior member of the party's leadership" a month from Starmer's accession. In April 2020, a leaked internal party report revealed Murphy to have been a primary target of hostility expressed by the right-wing senior party staff in their private messages during Corbyn's tenure as leader.

=== Later political activity ===
By September 2020, Murphy was reported to be co-ordinating the efforts to unite the Labour left into a new group in order to preserve gains made under Corbyn's leadership.

Labour's Community Organising Unit, established in January 2018 and seen as controlled by Murphy, was disbanded in February 2021 as part of the crackdown on the Corbynist left.

In October 2021, Keir Starmer's party leadership named Murphy as one of the persons suspected of the deliberate leaking of thousands of items of personal data, which could cost the party millions of pounds in fines and payments, and said they were taking legal action against her. However, the investigation into Labour concluded in January 2023 with no fines imposed, and Labour dropped its court case against Murphy and others in June 2024.

In 2024, Murphy organised a steering group to discuss the creation of a new left-wing party in the UK. In September 2024, she took part in a meeting on this subject, hosted by the group Collective (which described itself as "the engine that will drive the formation of a new, mass-membership political party of the left in the UK"). Along with the founders of Collective, Pamela Fitzpatrick and Justin Schlosberg, she backed Len McCluskey's push for an immediate launch of the party, facing opposition from a localist faction created by Andrew Feinstein and Jamie Driscoll, and from Corbyn himself. In March 2025, Murphy joined Fitzpatrick as an executive director of Collective.

In September 2025, Zarah Sultana (a former employee of the Community Organising Unit) cited Murphy's alleged "sole financial control" over the newly formed Your Party as a justification for unilaterally launching the party's membership appeal.

== Personal life ==
In 2017, Murphy revealed she had donated a kidney to save the life of a boy she did not know.

As of 2025, she was the partner of Len McCluskey, the former general secretary of Unite the Union. The pair had been reported to be on close terms by 2013.

She is not related to Jim Murphy, the Scottish Labour leader in 2014–2015.
