= 2013 Labour Party Falkirk candidate selection =

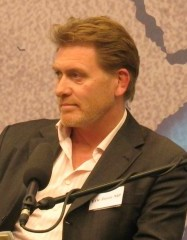
Eric Joyce, the outgoing member

The Falkirk parliamentary constituency within Scotland

In 2013 in the United Kingdom, Eric Joyce, the member of Parliament (MP) for Falkirk, resigned from the Labour Party and announced he would not seek re-election. The process of nominating a replacement candidate for the 2015 general election led to a dispute between the party and its major financial backer Unite the Union, causing the suspension of two local party members, the resignation of the MP Tom Watson as Labour's 2015 election strategist, as well as the forwarding of an internal report into the situation to Police Scotland.

== Background ==
Joyce was selected as the Labour Party candidate and was elected the member of Parliament (MP) for Falkirk at the 2010 general election. Following a series of alcohol-related incidents, including a drink-driving conviction and two fights in a House of Commons bar, Joyce resigned from the Labour Party, saying that he intended to complete his term as an MP but not seek re-election.

== Selection process ==
The selection process for a new Labour prospective parliamentary candidate (PPC) for Falkirk began in late 2012. Until Joyce had resigned his membership of the Labour Party in February 2012, the membership of Falkirk West Constituency Labour Party (CLP) stood at fewer than 100 members.

Soon after Joyce's resignation, Stephen Deans, a local shop steward who had risen to become chairman for Unite in Scotland, became chair of the Falkirk West CLP. In line with the then Unite policy, and also within the Labour Party rules in force at the time, Deans began recruiting Unite members, mainly from the local Ineos Grangemouth Refinery, where Unite had been involved in a pensions dispute in 2008, as new members of the Falkirk West CLP, and paying their membership fees. By January 2013, membership of the Falkirk West CLP stood at over 200 members, all of whom were entitled to vote in the process to select a new parliamentary candidate. Although he was now no longer a member of the Labour Party, Joyce, whose own actions had been at the root of the need to select a new candidate, blogged about allegations arising from unnamed persons, supposedly, he claimed, to "flood" the CLP with Unite members. Joyce was threatened with legal action via a solicitor's letter from Unite.

It became clear that the recruitment efforts of Unite were in support of a particular potential candidate, Karie Murphy. A leaked Unite document from December 2012 detailed its activity in Falkirk as "exemplary" for the way in which "we have recruited well over 100 Unite members to the party in a constituency with less than 200 members. 57 came from responses to a text message alone, (followed up face to face). A collective effort locally, but led and inspired by the potential candidate".

The constituency decided to adopt the process provided by the national Labour Party for an all-women's shortlist, with the CLP Executive Committee agreeing, by consensus, to consult on this question, but two of the other prospective candidates, Linda Gow, a former leader of Falkirk Council, and Gregor Poynton, UK political director at communications firm Blue State, publicly wrote to all constituency members asking for an open contest.

In February 2013 the selection process for the new PPC was deferred to the Labour Party's National Executive Committee (NEC). In March, the NEC proposed that the process should be scrutinised by the Labour Party organisation sub-committee, and that an internal NEC report on allegations be completed, covering the perceived promoting of Karie Murphy (a former Chair of the Scottish Labour Party, and Unite's preferred candidate), as PPC, and the mass recruitment of Unite members to the constituency, with their membership fees being paid en bloc by the union. Joyce commented after the National Executive Committee (NEC) report was handed to the police that -

The amateur, hubristic and irresponsible actions of a small number of Unite officials at the top of the organisation will require some rules to be changed to prevent another Falkirk.

As a result of the NEC investigation, Murphy withdrew her name from the selection process. Stephen Deans, who was still the chair of both Unite Scotland and the Falkirk West CLP, said the suspension of the PPC selection process by the NEC was an attack on the union by a "Blairite rump", and that "the decision taken is purely an attack on the work Unite has been doing in the constituency to recruit its members into the Labour Party". Both Murphy and Deans were later briefly suspended by the Labour Party in light of the contents of an NEC internal report in June 2013.

== Investigation ==
In May 2013, whilst speaking at the annual Progress conference, the former Labour MP and business secretary Lord Mandelson claimed that a cabal at the top of the NEC were trying to exert influence, and warned Ed Miliband, the leader of the Labour Party, that he "was storing up danger for himself and for a future Labour government over parliamentary selections".

On 25 June 2013, in the light of allegations claimed to be contained within the completed NEC internal report, the Labour Party Central Office implemented "special measures" under the Labour Party constitution, and took direct control of candidate selection in Falkirk. A spokesperson commented:

After an internal inquiry into the Falkirk constituency we have found there is sufficient evidence to raise concern about the legitimacy of members qualifying to participate in the selection of a Westminster candidate. As a result, NEC officers today decided a series of measures are needed to uphold the integrity of the Labour party.

The NEC later concluded that anyone who had joined the Labour Party in Falkirk after 12 March 2012, when Eric Joyce announced he was stepping down, would not be allowed to take part in the selection process. The NEC then suspended provisional candidate Karie Murphy and Falkirk party chairman Stephen Deans, a decision which Unite the Union criticised.

On 27 June Unite General Secretary Len McCluskey wrote to his members with regards to the NEC special measures process:

These decisions have been taken on the basis of an 'investigation' into the CLP (Constituency Labour Party), the report of which your union has not been allowed to see. As a result, not only are the rights of Falkirk CLP members being ignored, Unite is being subjected to a behind-the-scenes smear campaign. We will be challenging this procedure and this campaign through all proper channels within the party, publicly and by legal action if necessary.

On 2 July the former Labour home secretary David Blunkett, speaking on BBC Two's Daily Politics, said the party had "taken the right step by having an investigation" and said he hoped the NEC would "deal with it decisively". Blunkett went on to say he thought the party should publish the internal report, adding that Labour "should be as transparent as possible". However, a Labour Party spokesperson later said that it was standard practice not to publish the NEC's internal reports.

On 4 July the MP Tom Watson resigned as Labour's 2015 general election campaign co-ordinator, though he remained in place as Deputy Chair of the Labour Party. Watson confirmed that the provisional Falkirk candidate Karie Murphy had been his office manager prior to her selection.

After the NEC had been briefed by the party solicitor on 4 July, on 5 July Miliband announced that the party was to refer the NEC internal report into allegations of irregularities in the selection of a PPC in Falkirk to Police Scotland, after confirming that the NEC internal inquiry had shown irregularities in the Falkirk Labour Party's candidate selection process.

The Conservative MP Henry Smith then wrote to the Chief constable of Scotland, Sir Stephen House, asking for an investigation, suggesting that Unite might have committed fraud. On 25 July Police Scotland concluded that there were insufficient grounds to support an investigation. A spokesman for Police Scotland told the BBC: "Following a comprehensive review of all material submitted, Police Scotland has concluded there are insufficient grounds to support a criminal investigation at this time. However, should further information come to light this will be looked into."

== Consequences ==
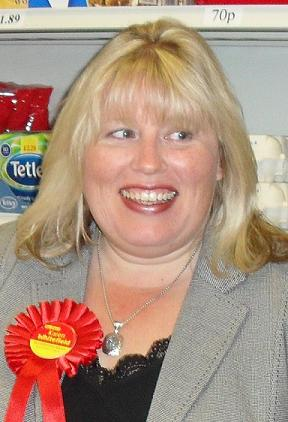
Karen Whitefield was later chosen as the Labour candidate for Falkirk.

Murphy and Deans were suspended by the Labour Party in the light of submission of the NEC internal report in June 2013. Murphy had withdrawn her candidature for the PPC position and both were later reinstated as party members after having their names cleared of any wrongdoing. The Labour Party immediately changed its rules, to prevent affiliated unions from paying the Labour Party membership fees for their members to be individual members of constituency Labour parties.

The Guardian reported in July 2013 that the row had also led to a former cabinet minister and other "senior party figures" calling for the Labour Party to break its formal links with the trade union movement. The incident fuelled calls for reforms to Labour's selection system and led to the 2014 Collin's Report which was adopted by the party and changed the system for both leadership elections and candidate selection.

A re-selection was held on 8 December 2013. Karen Whitefield, who had not been involved in the controversy, was chosen as the prospective candidate for Falkirk.

At the general election of May 2015, Labour's share of the vote in the Falkirk constituency fell by 20.6%, with the Scottish National Party (SNP) gaining the seat on a 24.1% swing, which was typical of the swing from Labour to the SNP in Scotland.
