= Len McCluskey =

British trade unionist (born 1950)

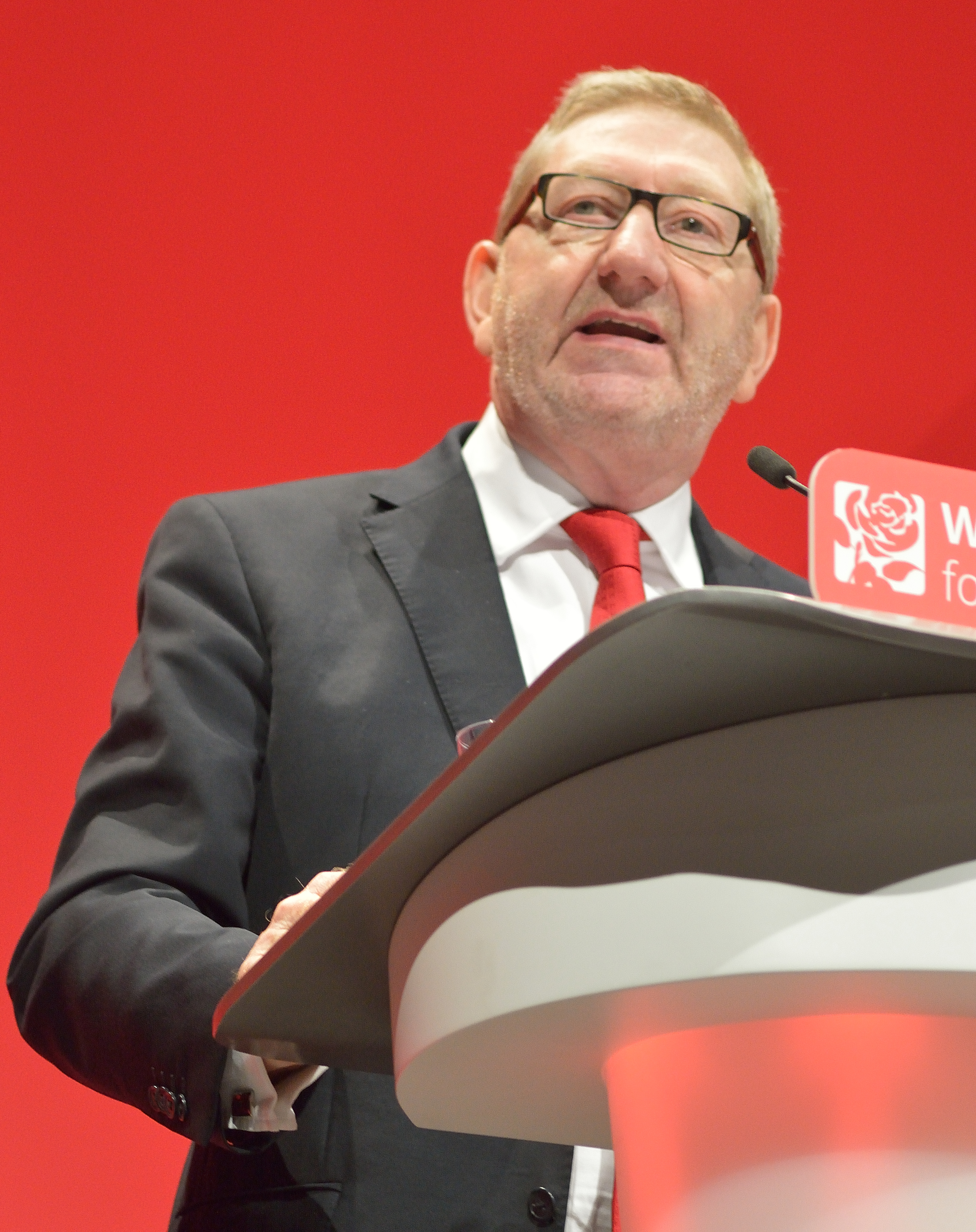
- McCluskey at the 2016 Labour Party Conference

General secretary of Unite the Union
- In office 1 January 2011 – 26 August 2021
- Preceded by: Derek Simpson; Tony Woodley
- Succeeded by: Sharon Graham

Secretary of the General Workers Trade Group of the Transport and General Workers' Union
- In office 1990–2004
- Preceded by: Peter Evans
- Succeeded by: Post abolished

Personal details
- Born: Leonard David McCluskey; 23 July 1950 (age 75) Liverpool, England
- Party: Independent
- Other party: Labour (1970–2024)
- Occupation: Trade unionist

Leonard David McCluskey (born 23 July 1950) is a retired British trade unionist. He was general secretary of Unite the Union, the largest affiliate and a major donor to the Labour Party. As a young adult, he spent some years working in the Liverpool Docks for the Mersey Docks and Harbour Company prior to becoming a full-time union official for the Transport and General Workers' Union (T&GWU) in 1979.

McCluskey was elected as the general secretary of Unite in 2010, and was re-elected to his post in 2013 and 2017, before announcing his retirement in 2021. A former member of the Labour Party, McCluskey was on the party's left. He was a key backer and supporter of Jeremy Corbyn during his time as Leader of the Labour Party.

== Early life ==
Leonard David McCluskey was born in Liverpool, Lancashire, on 23 July 1950, the son of Leonard, a painter-decorator, and Peggy (née Margaret Fulton), a housewife who reportedly politically inspired her son. He failed the 11-plus, but passed the 13-plus, intended for late developers. A Catholic, he attended Cardinal Godfrey Technical High School in Anfield. Leaving school with three A-levels, in history, economics and general studies, he began his working life on the Canada Dock, part of the Port of Liverpool.

Employed by the Mersey Docks and Harbour Board (the Mersey Docks and Harbour Company from 1972) as a ship’s planner, he drew maps indicating the location of cargo in the hold so it could be retrieved at the unloading port. He worked for the company for 11 years.

== Early trade union activism ==
McCluskey joined the Transport and General Workers' Union (T&GWU) in 1968, and became a shop steward for the union the following year. He was involved in unionising the white collar staff in the Liverpool docks among whom previously there had been an absence of trade union organisation. After joining the Labour Party in 1970, he became an officer of the T&GWU in Merseyside in 1979 and was its campaign organiser throughout the 1980s.

During the 1980s he became a close friend of Tony Mulhearn and Derek Hatton, then deputy leader of Liverpool City Council, and supported the Militant tendency. "I would never, ever deny that", he told the Liverpool Echo in 2009 "but I never became a member". He added: "In the end I decided that Militant was too sectarian from a political standpoint to be effective. But I believe that on the chief issues they were right".

McCluskey was elected as the National Secretary of the T&GWU General Workers group in 1990, and moved to London to work in the union's national headquarters.

In 2004, he became the T&GWU's national organiser for the service industries. In 2007, he was appointed as the assistant general secretary for industrial strategy of the Unite the Union, a merger of the T&GWU and Amicus.

He defines himself as being on the left of the union, and has been given the label of "Red Len" in the British press because of his involvement in Unite's dispute with British Airways. In a speech at the 2010 Durham Miners' Gala he said political developments in Cuba and Venezuela should be better known, and suggested the reason they were not was because of "the fear of the good example".

However, in March 2012 the industrial correspondent of the Press Association, Alan Jones, distinguished McCluskey during the BA dispute from the former National Union of Mineworkers (NUM) leader Arthur Scargill: "I think he's more willing to cut a deal". Labour politician Jon Trickett told George Eaton in 2016: "He got to the top through force of personality, intellect and organising skill". He expressed regret in 2009, and again in 2011, that the Labour governments of Tony Blair and Gordon Brown did not reverse the legislative changes affecting trade unions of the immediately preceding Conservative governments. He argued in June 2016, that the changes made by those governments have "left the lowest paid and the most vulnerable workers in our society in dire straits".

Unite and McCluskey backed Ed Miliband to become the next Labour leader in 2010. The votes of members of Unite, plus Unison and the GMB, were enough for Miliband to be elected leader over the preference for his brother, David Miliband, of party members and MPs in the electoral college (by then 33 per cent each) which was in force at the time.

== General secretaryship of Unite ==
=== 2010 and 2013 Unite election ===
In 2010, McCluskey ran for election as general secretary of Unite to replace joint-general secretaries Derek Simpson and Tony Woodley, who had both announced their retirement. On 21 November 2010, it was announced that McCluskey had been elected to the post, beating Jerry Hicks, Les Bayliss and Gail Cartmail. He gained 101,000 votes in a total 16 per cent turnout of around 1.5 million members.

Simpson retired in December 2010, and Woodley followed shortly after that, leaving McCluskey to take office as general secretary on 1 January 2011. In December 2010, McCluskey wrote in The Guardian that "there is no case for cuts at all", the government's "austerity frenzy" being "whipped up for explicitly ideological reasons" to complete "Thatcherism's unfinished business by strangling the welfare state".

In 2013, McCluskey announced that he would be running for re-election as general secretary. He was re-elected in April 2013 with 144,570 votes against Jerry Hicks with 79,819 votes on a turnout of 15.2 per cent. In September 2013, Hicks complained to the trade union watchdog, the certification officer, that the result should be declared void as 156,000 ballot papers had been sent to people no longer paying union subscriptions. However, the union was obliged by law to give them a vote (very few actually voted).

=== Relations with Ed Miliband ===
In an April 2013 interview for the New Statesman, McCluskey urged Miliband to drop three "Blairite" shadow ministers from his frontbench team. A spokesman for Miliband said McCluskey did not speak for the party and the "attempt to divide the Labour Party is reprehensible" and was "disloyal to the party".

In July 2013, there were allegations of vote rigging in the Falkirk constituency. A consultation over an all-women shortlist was abandoned over fears that not all members had been invited to participate. This was thought suspicious because Unite's preferred candidate was Karie Murphy. Meanwhile, Unite had paid for scores of people to join the Labour Party in line with the union's political strategy. Miliband called in the police to establish whether there had been criminal behaviour. The police investigation was dropped in July. Murphy dropped out as a potential candidate in September 2013, and the Labour Party investigation and report found that there had been no wrongdoing. Charges against Murphy and the CLP's chairman Stevie Deans were dismissed.

McCluskey threatened to disaffiliate Unite from Labour and launch a new workers' party in March 2014 if Labour lost the 2015 general election, which could cause Labour to cease to exist in its current form, according to Jim Pickard of the Financial Times. Following Labour's electoral defeat, he found fault with the party's policy proposals, which he thought were "not particularly radical" and believed the party had fallen "for the Tories' austerity trap".

=== 2015 and 2016 Labour leadership elections ===
During the 2015 Labour leadership election, Unite and McCluskey supported Jeremy Corbyn's candidacy, later reasserted by McCluskey when some senior figures in the union wanted to support Andy Burnham. According to George Eaton of the New Statesman, McCluskey was thought privately to share this view (which was denied by McCluskey, who was always a Corbyn supporter). Office space was supplied to Corbyn's campaign and by March 2018, Unite had donated £11 million to the Labour Party since Corbyn became leader.

McCluskey later termed the events of June and July 2016 concerning Corbyn's leadership of the Labour Party as a "crazy vote of no confidence, this mass resignation" and "this coup attempt" in an interview with Decca Aitkenhead of The Guardian.

=== 2017 re-election as general secretary ===
In December 2016, McCluskey resigned as general secretary and stood again in a leadership election. McCluskey's main challenger was Gerard Coyne, then Unite's organiser in the West Midlands. McCluskey was re-elected in April 2017 by less than 6,000 votes over Coyne; 59,067 votes (45.4 per cent) to Coyne's 53,544 (41.5 per cent) on a turnout of 12.2 per cent. The other candidate was Ian Allinson who received 17,143 votes (13.1 per cent). An investigation into Coyne's actions during the election, led by Andrew Murray, the union's chief of staff, resulted in Coyne being fired for the misuse of data in June 2017. Coyne's subsequent complaint to the Trades Union Certification Officer was dismissed on all ten counts, and the officer found that Coyne had included misleading information in some of his election literature.

=== Announced retirement and election of successor ===
In August 2021, McCluskey announced his retirement as the general secretary of Unite after ten years in the role. In the lead up to electing a replacement for McCluskey, the union's left-wing United Left faction held a hustings and ballot to determine a single candidate for the faction, which was won by the union's assistant general secretary Steve Turner. Turner, who was seen as close to McCluskey, was subsequently endorsed by McCluskey in the upcoming election. Four candidates, including Turner, made it through to the ballot to replace McCluskey as the Unite general secretary. On 25 August 2021, the candidate Sharon Graham won the election taking office as Unite general secretary the following day.

== Allegations of financial mismanagement within Unite ==
McCluskey has been the subject of controversy regarding financial dealings by Unite when he was general secretary. In 2016, it was reported that Unite had contributed £400,000 towards a London flat purchased by him in his role as general secretary. Union officials defended the arrangement, stating that it was an equity agreement rather than a loan and that Unite would hold 60% of the property and receive that fraction of the sale price when eventually sold. McCluskey bought out the union's share of the flat in 2018, amidst a potential probe into his re-election as general secretary.

In January 2021, Unite's executive counsel convened to discuss cost overruns on a union-funded building project undertaken by Paul Flanagan, a close personal associate of McCluskey; the construction works, which were originally supposed to cost £7 million pounds, had reached a cost of £96.5 million by January 2021, with an estimated £15 million in profits accruing to Flanagan. In December 2021, Sharon Graham announced an independent inquiry into the project. In February 2022, it was revealed that independent valuations of the completed building project, which includes a hotel, a conference center, and Unite's regional offices, came in at between £27 and £29 million pounds, roughly £70 million less than the project's cost of just under £100 million. McCluskey defended the building project, describing it as a “sensible investment of members’ money, resulting in a world-class facility that will return an income for our union for generations to come”. An internal report by Unite in 2025 alleged that McCluskey had received private jet flights and football tickets paid for by the Flanagan Group, though McCluskey's lawyers denied this. In relation to the construction contract itself the report found no evidence of who had appointed Flanagan Group but that McCluskey had signed the contract, though McCluskey claimed to have no recollection of this.

== Retirement ==
After retirement as Unite general secretary, McCluskey's second book Always Red was released in December 2021; his first book, Why You Should Be a Trade Unionist, was published in 2020, during his third term as general secretary.

In October 2021, McCluskey told Scottish Labour to back another Scottish independence referendum in order to win back support from the Scottish National Party. "We've been telling Labour in Scotland since 2007 – when a certain Nicola Sturgeon won a seat in Glasgow – to wake up and smell the coffee," he told Good Morning Scotland. "The reality is the SNP have stolen the radical clothes of Scottish Labour and Scottish Labour have lost the trust of ordinary working people. They're going to have to battle really strongly [to regain that trust]. In my opinion they should support a second referendum on independence - what they actually do when that referendum comes can still be debated."

== Books ==
- Why You Should Be a Trade Unionist. Verso Books. 2020. ISBN 9781788737876.
- McCluskey, Len (2021). Always Red. OR Books. ISBN 978-1-68219-272-6.

== Personal life ==
McCluskey was married to Ann for more than 20 years; the couple had a son. After moving to the T&GWU lead office in London, McCluskey had a child with Jennie Formby in 1991; both names are listed on the birth certificate. From 1994, McCluskey lived with Paula Lace (now Williams) with whom he had a daughter. As of 2025, he was the partner of Karie Murphy, a fellow trade unionist.

Prior to the 2015 general election, he was a close friend and ally of Tom Watson, with whom he had briefly shared a flat in south London. He fell out with Watson over the latter's involvement in the 2016 challenge to Jeremy Corbyn's leadership of the Labour Party.

Trade union offices
Preceded by Peter Evans	Secretary of the General Workers Trade Group of the Transport and General Workers' Union; 1990–2004	Succeeded by ?
Preceded by Derek Simpson	General secretary of Unite; 2011–2021	Succeeded by Sharon Graham
Preceded by Tony Woodley	General secretary of Unite; 2011–2021	Succeeded by Sharon Graham
