= Sharon Graham =

British trade unionist (born 1968)

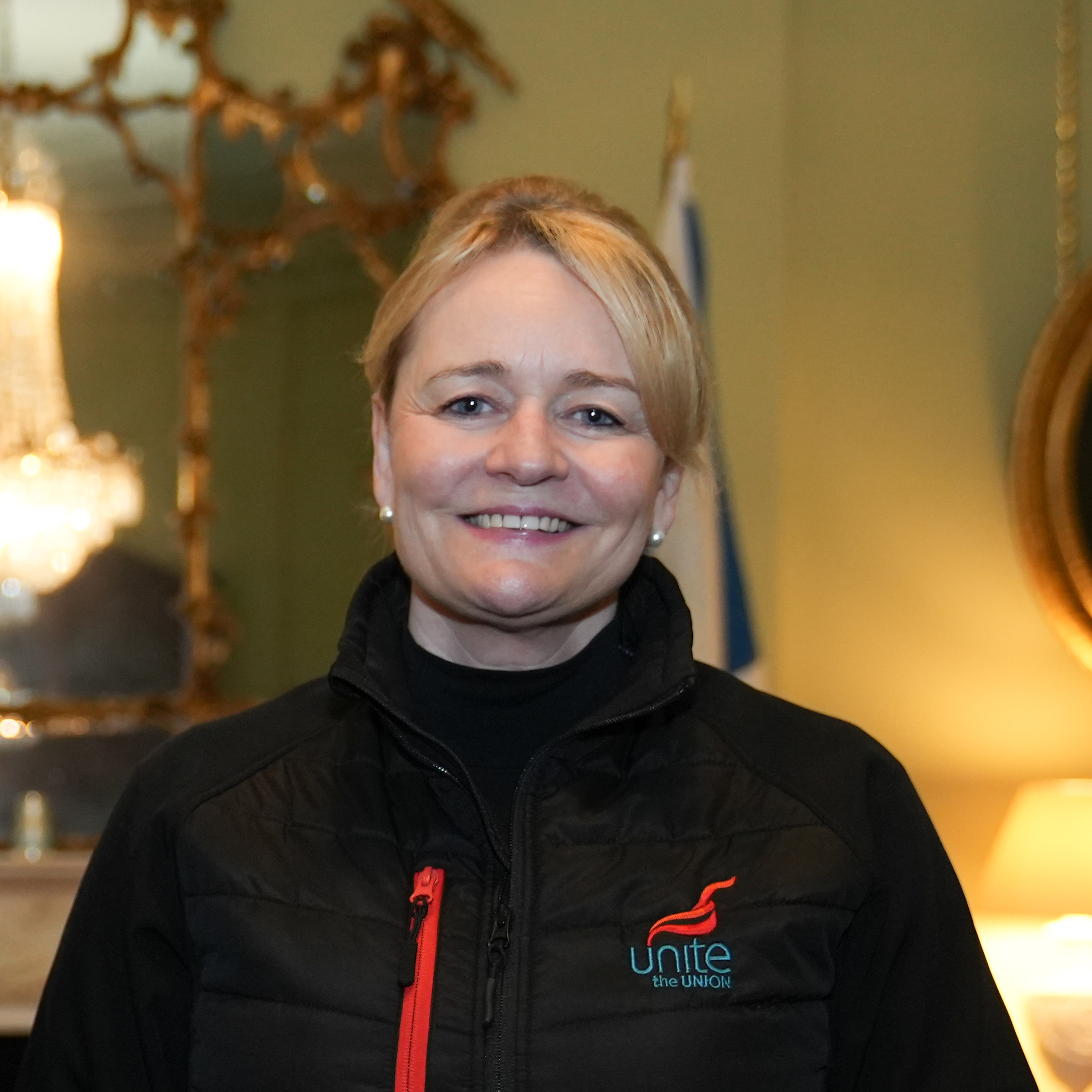
- Sharon Graham in 2024

General Secretary of Unite the Union
- Incumbent
- Assumed office 26 August 2021
- Preceded by: Len McCluskey

Personal details
- Born: 3 December 1968 (age 57) London, England
- Party: Labour
- Spouse: Jack Clarke
- Children: 1
- Occupation: Trade unionist
- Website: sharongraham.org

Sharon Mairead Graham (born 3 December 1968) is a British trade unionist who has been the general secretary of Unite since 26 August 2021. She is the first woman to hold the position. She previously served as the union's executive officer and as head of its organising and leverage department.

== Early life ==
Graham was born in Hammersmith in 1968. She is one of four children to a father from Newcastle upon Tyne and a mother from Abbeyfeale, County Limerick. She went to the Sacred Heart High School in Hammersmith.

She left school and began work as a silver service waitress at 16, and led her first walkout at 17 in defence of the rights of casual workers. The strike was successful and won her colleagues equal pay. Graham initially intended to go into journalism and she worked for an estate agent. When she was 27, she studied at the Trades Union Congress's Organising Academy.

== Career ==
=== Union official ===
Graham began working as a national youth and development officer for the Transport and General Workers' Union, which later became Unite the Union in a merger. In 2016, she was working as Unite's director of organising. She was considered a potential candidate in the union's 2017 general secretary election, which had been prompted by Len McCluskey's early resignation to seek a new mandate. She ran the union's organising and leverage department, running twelve successful leverage campaigns, which involves taking action beyond the immediate management to company directors, shareholders, investors and suppliers.

She led the union's response to British Airways (BA) attempt to fire and rehire staff on worse contracts in 2020. She said that the airline should be stripped of its privileges at Heathrow Airport due to the way it had treated its staff, and that if the behaviour went unchecked then more companies would act in a similar way. More than 280 Members of Parliament pledged to support a review of BA's privileged access to take-off and landing slots at airports. In her role as a union official, Graham also led Unite's campaign to unionise Amazon.

In 2021, McCluskey announced his retirement as general secretary of Unite after ten years in the role. The union's left-wing United Left faction held a hustings and ballot to determine a single candidate for the faction, which was won by the union's assistant general secretary Steve Turner. The other participant, Howard Beckett, continued as a candidate without the support of United Left. Graham, although also considered to be on the left wing of the union, ran in the election without seeking the faction's endorsement. She said she was "not a member of any Unite or Labour faction - other than my own supporters group". Her campaign was focused on redirecting attention towards workers' rights and workplaces instead of engaging with the internal politics of the Labour Party, of which Unite is an affiliated trade union. After the close of nominations, Beckett withdrew from the election and endorsed Turner. McCluskey also endorsed Turner, and members pressured Graham to withdraw and support Turner to prevent Gerard Coyne, a centrist candidate, from becoming general secretary. Graham declined to do so, and received online abuse for her decision to remain a candidate. Her election campaign was supported by the Socialist Workers Party and the Socialist Party.

=== General Secretary ===
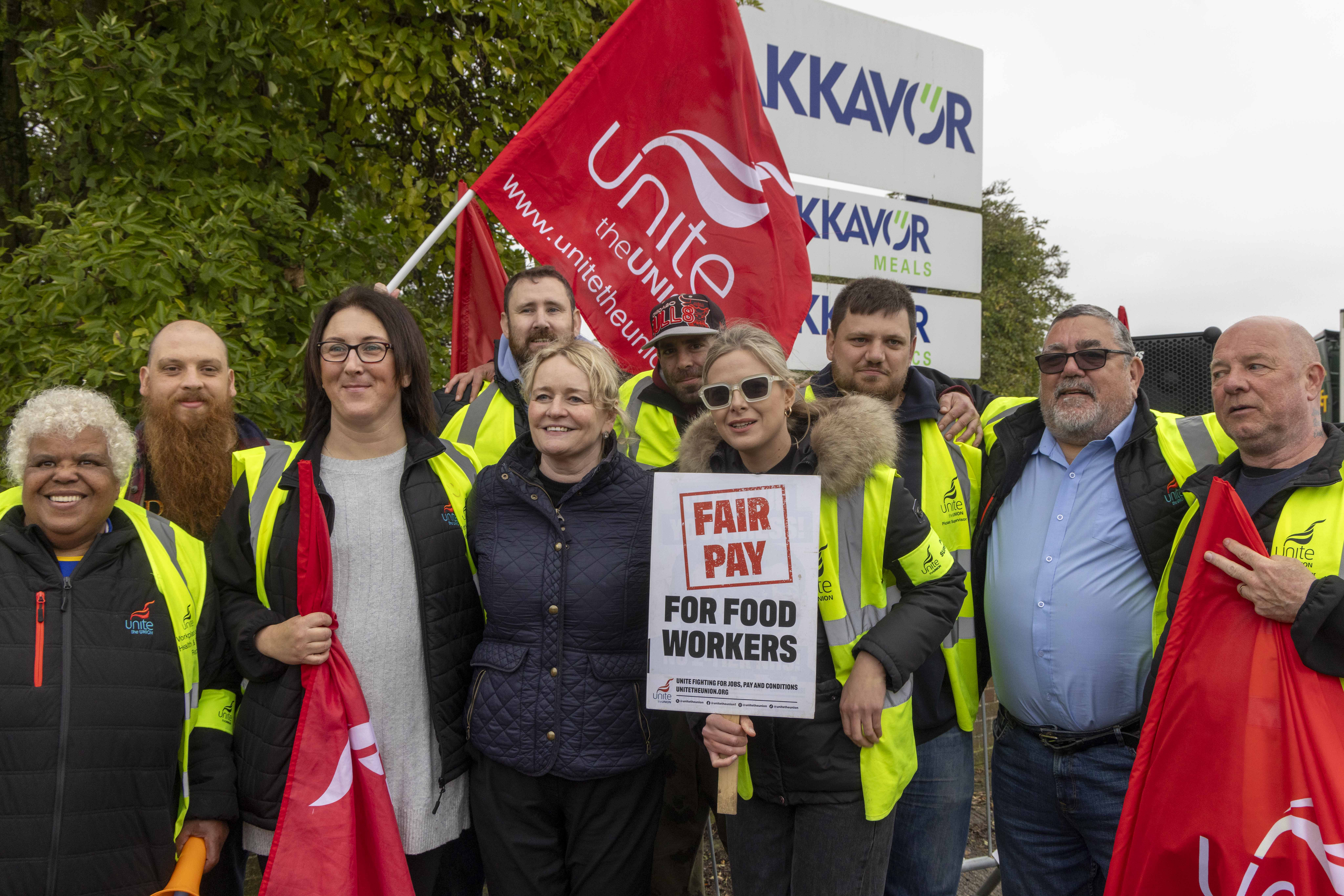
Graham (4th left) with members at international food product company Bakkavör in 2024

Graham was elected the general secretary of Unite on 25 August 2021 with 46,696 votes, 37.7% of the votes cast, on a turnout of 10%, and took office on 26 August. In September 2021, she wrote in The Guardian that Unite should focus more on fighting "for jobs, pay and conditions" rather than "hoping for the election of a Labour government to solve our members' problems". The same month, she warned Keir Starmer that he had "lost touch with reality" because of his plan to scrap the one-member-one-vote Labour Party leadership election rule. On 9 February 2022, following the controversial treatment of workers at Labour-led Coventry Council, she stated that all remaining Labour funding was "under review". Starmer said that the Labour Party would not be "influenced by threats". In 2023, Graham's confrontational approach to the Labour Party led to the New Statesman naming her as the eleventh most powerful left wing figure in the UK that year.

On 11 March 2026, the anniversary of the start of the Birmingham bin strike, Unite cut its annual donation to the Labour Party by £580,000, a decrease of 40% from its previous funding of £1.45 million which was the largest union donation to Labour. The Labour controlled Birmingham City Council had decided to remove Waste Recycling and Collection Officer posts, and a dispute had been on-going for a year. The union stated a resolution of the dispute has been formulated at the Advisory, Conciliation and Arbitration Service (Acas), but the Labour-run council had not agreed to it. Unite's criticism of Labour extended beyond the Birmingham dispute, with Graham saying "Unite members are coming to the end of the line as far as Labour is concerned. Workers are scratching their heads asking whose side are Labour on, who do they really represent, because it certainly isn’t workers." A periodic Unite rules conference will take place in 2027, which may consider whether the union should remain affiliated to the Labour Party.

In June 2026, Graham said that energy and climate change secretary Ed Miliband should not be chosen as Chancellor of the Exchequer by the prospective Andy Burnham government because he pursued a net-zero emissions policy, pointing to Miliband's failure to approve new oil and gas fields in the North Sea which would create many working-class jobs.

In August 2026, Graham was reelected for another 5 year term.

== Personal life ==
Graham married Jack Clarke in 2005. They have a son and live in Hammersmith.
