= Andrew Fisher (political activist) =

British political activist and author

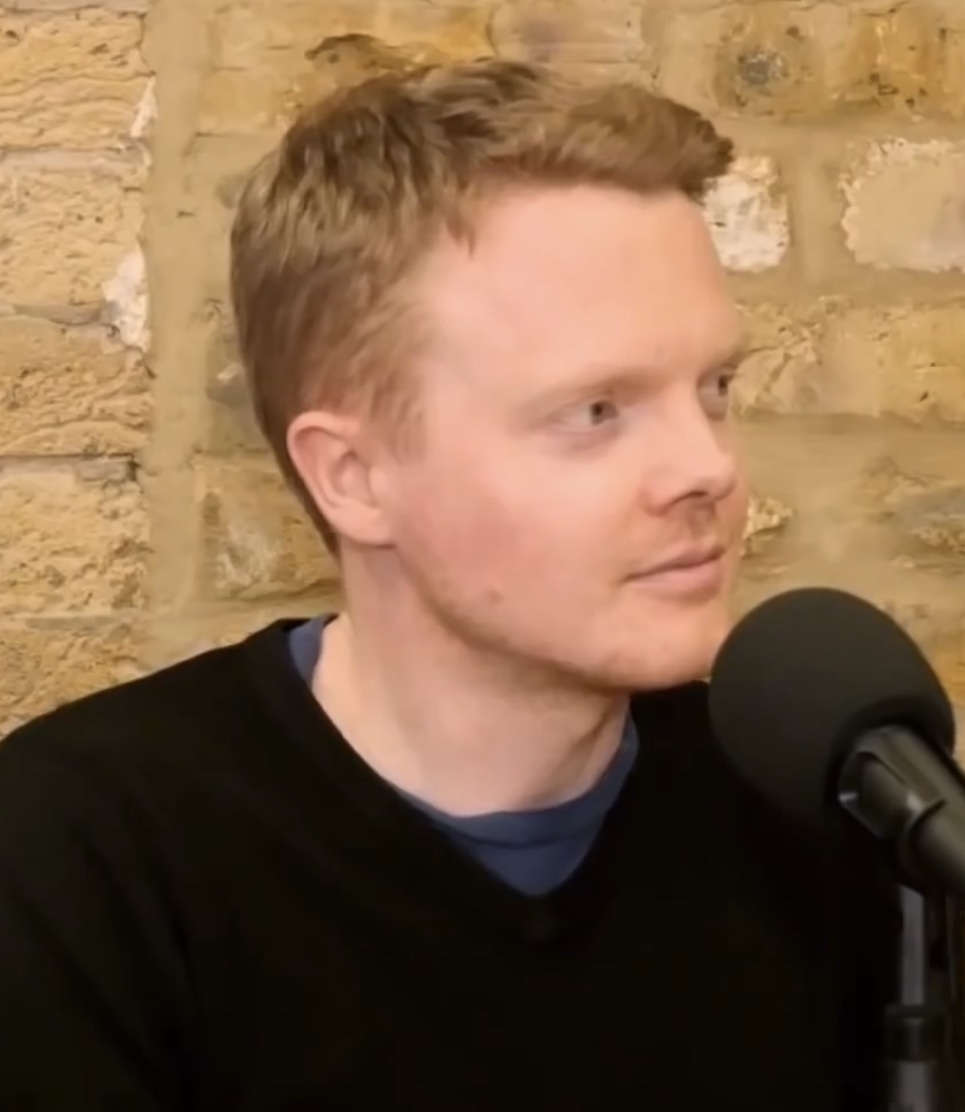
- Fisher in 2020
- Born: 28 December 1979 (age 46); Portsmouth, Hampshire, England
- Occupations: policy advisor; activist; writer; trade unionist
- Political party: Labour

Andrew Fisher (born 28 December 1979) is an English political adviser and researcher, writer, and trade unionist. He served as Director of Policy of the Labour Party, under leader Jeremy Corbyn, from 2015 to 2019.

== Early life ==
Fisher was born in Portsmouth, Hampshire and grew up in Worthing, West Sussex. He holds a Master of Arts degree in Politics.

== Professional career ==
Fisher worked as a parliamentary researcher for six years, and was policy officer at the Public and Commercial Services (PCS) trade union. According to Labour List, in 2006 he co-founded the Left Economics Advisory Panel (LEAP), a body chaired by John McDonnell.

After Jeremy Corbyn became Leader of the Labour Party in September 2015, Fisher was appointed as an adviser. In November 2015, he was suspended from the Labour Party, following complaints from other Labour party members, for appearing to endorse a Class War candidate in the May 2015 general election. In a statement, Corbyn stated that he still had full confidence in him. Fisher apologised and said that he had been misinterpreted. His suspension was lifted by the Labour National Executive Committee later in the month, and he was issued with a warning. Fisher was responsible for Labour's 2017 general election manifesto.

He resigned as policy director on 21 September 2019, ostensibly for family reasons while citing conflict with fellow members of Corbyn's team (alleged to represent anti-Atlanticism and upper class interests, and thought to include Seumas Milne and Karie Murphy) in a private memo, but remained in the leader's office in anticipation of the upcoming general election, which he claimed Labour would not win. He was then credited with influencing the October 2019 dismissal of Karie Murphy as Corbyn's chief of staff, regarded as favourable to John McDonnell and Diane Abbott's advocacy of a second Brexit referendum. He had a key role in the party's campaign in the December 2019 general election.

=== Writing ===
Fisher has also maintained a blog at LEAP Economics. He is the author of The Failed Experiment: And How to Build an Economy that Works, a book published in 2014 about the 2008 financial crisis. According to one reviewer, the book "argues for the urgent need for a fundamental democratisation of the economy, and recognises this will require a re-intensification of popular struggles."

Fisher wrote an online article for The Guardian in the aftermath of the 2019 general election, published on 17 December 2019. He wrote another which was published on 18 January 2020, regarding the 2020 Labour Party deputy leadership election. In The i on 17 February 2020, he wrote regarding the legacy of Tony Blair and New Labour.

=== Television ===
Fisher appeared on the BBC's Politics Live on 13 January 2020, with Steve Baker, Anneliese Dodds and Sarah Baxter. He was also interviewed by Katie Razzall for the BBC's Newsnight on 17 January 2020, regarding the 2020 Labour Party leadership election.

== Personal life ==
Fisher is married with a son and has lived in Croydon since 2006.
