= Unite the Union =

British and Irish trade union

- Formation: July 1, 2007; 19 years ago
- Merger of: Amicus; Transport and General Workers' Union
- Type: Trade union
- Headquarters: London, England
- Locations: Ireland; United Kingdom
- Members: ▼1,177,292 (2023)
- General secretary: Sharon Graham
- Affiliations: TUC; ITUC; CSEU; Labour Party (UK); Labour Party (Ireland); ITUC; ETUC; PSI
- Website: www.unitetheunion.org

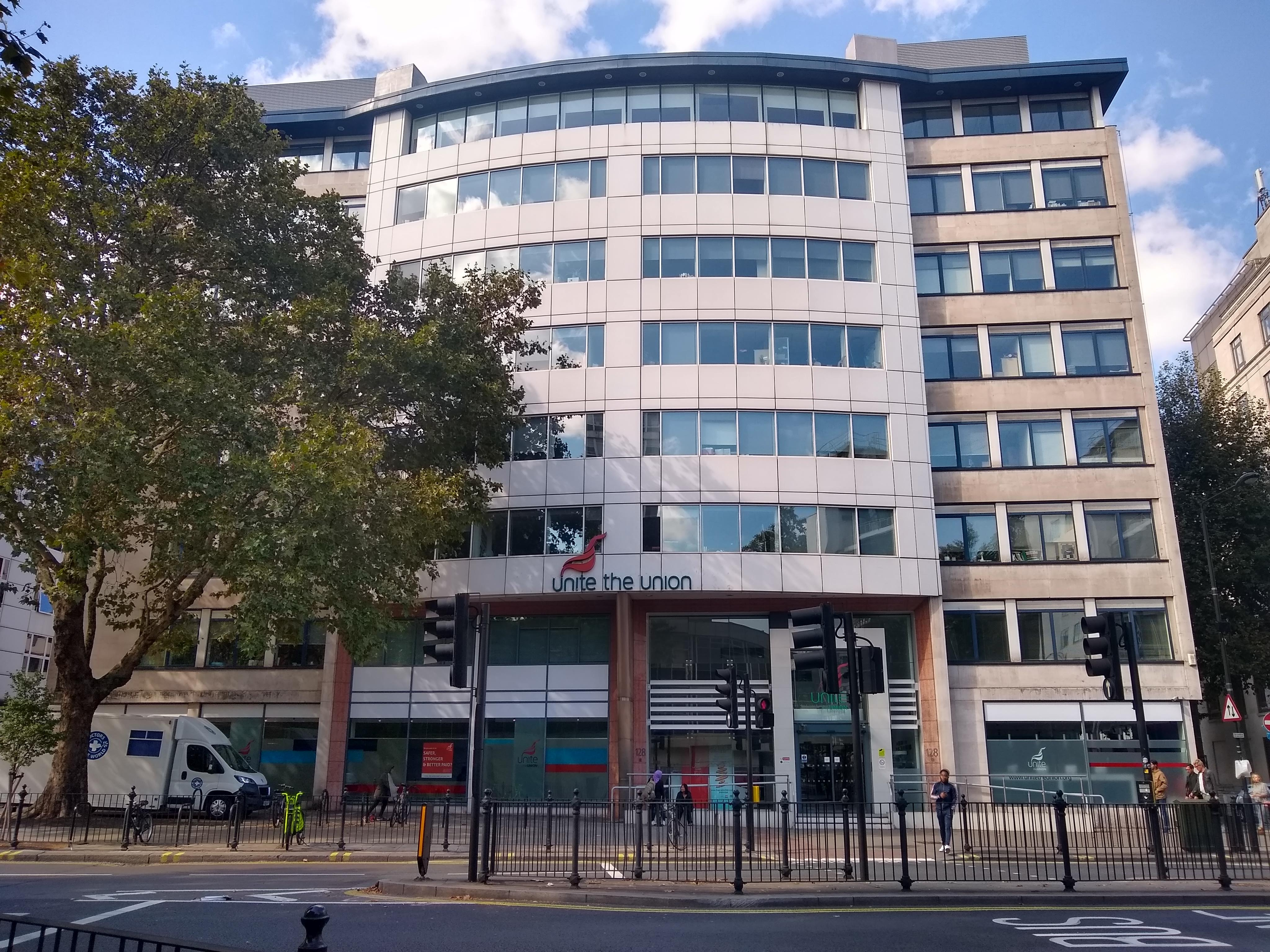
Unite building on Theobalds Road, London

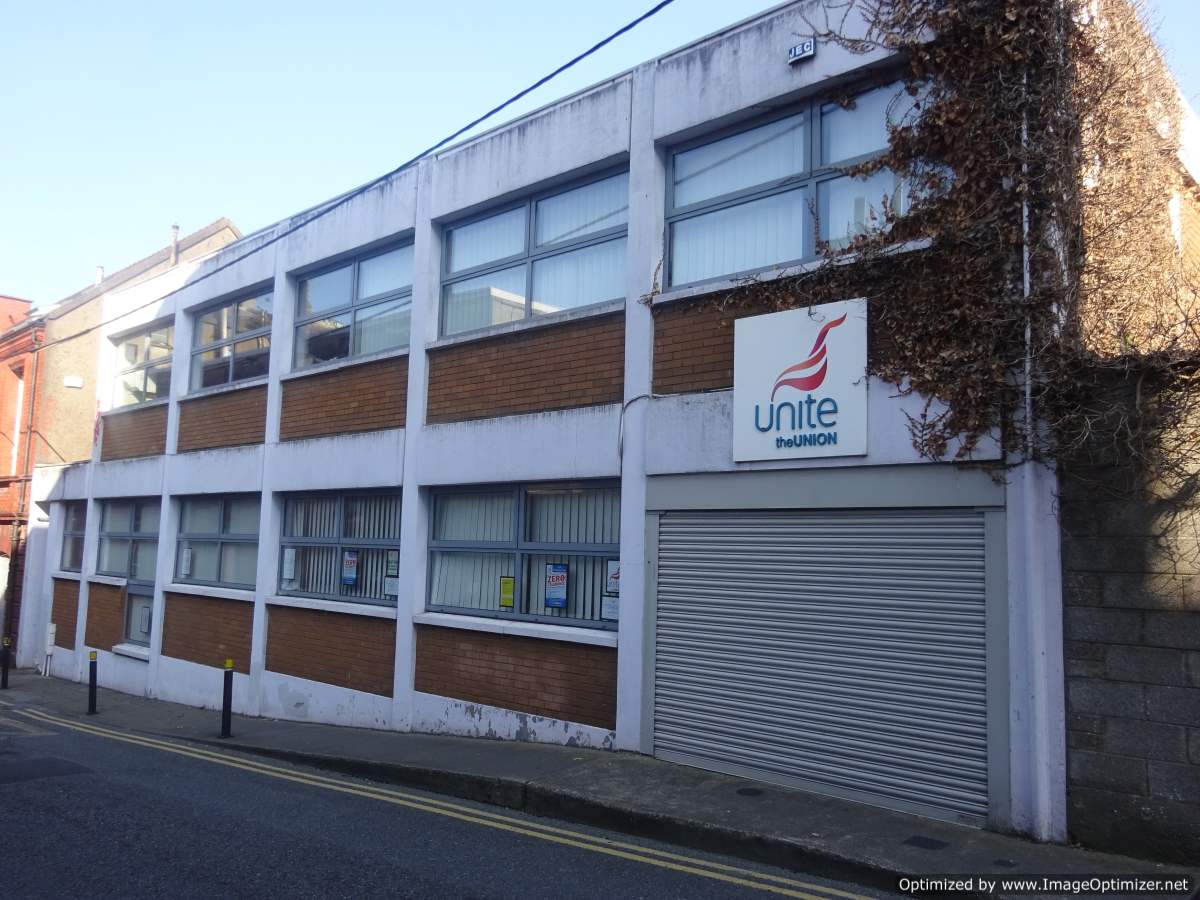
Offices in Waterford, Ireland

Unite the Union, commonly known as Unite, is a trade union in the United Kingdom and the Republic of Ireland, formed on 1 May 2007 by the merger of Amicus and the Transport and General Workers' Union (TGWU). A general union, Unite is one of the largest trade unions in the United Kingdom and Ireland, with over 1.2 million members. The current general secretary is Sharon Graham, who was elected in August 2021.

== History ==
=== Merger and early years (2007–2010) ===
Unite the Union was formed on 1 May 2007 by the merger of Amicus, a general private-sector union, and the Transport and General Workers' Union. The general secretaries of the previous unions, Derek Simpson and Tony Woodley respectively, served as joint general secretaries of the new union. The executive councils of the predecessor unions became a joint executive council which served until elections could be held for an executive council of Unite. The new council took office on 1 May 2008. They put a new rulebook for the union to a postal ballot of members during July 2008, which was accepted.

In 2008, there was a rooftop hunger strike at Unite's Transport House building in Belfast. The participants were formerly shop stewards of the Transport and General Workers' Union, now a section of Unite. The dispute was over legal fees and compensation for an unfair dismissal action against the workers' employer, arising from a 2002 strike at Belfast International Airport, and the related actions of a full-time union official employee.

In October 2009, British Airways announced that it would cut 1,700 cabin crew jobs. Unite, which represented 12,000 of the company's cabin crew, said that it had been in talks with British Airways about the company's plans to reduce costs, but that the announcement had not been shared with them in advance. British Airways suspended staff for sharing lists of pilots who had agreed to break a potential strike. Unite's assistant general secretary, Len McCluskey, said that some members had been suspended for being friends on Facebook with other attendants being investigated. In a strike ballot, more than 80% of cabin crew members of Unite voted to strike. The High Court of Justice granted an injunction against the strike on the basis that Unite had not informed its members about the number of spoilt ballots in a previous dispute. In total, there were twenty-two days of strike during the dispute.

In November 2009, Kraft Foods Inc. bid to purchase the confectionary company Cadbury. Unite represented its staff, and sought assurance about the status of jobs in the event of the purchase. Kraft went on to purchase Cadbury. In a Parliamentary committee, Unite representatives including deputy general secretary Jack Dromey and national food and drink officer Jennie Formby gave evidence to an inquiry about the takeover, saying that Kraft had delayed meeting union representatives. Formby later criticised the company for its compensation of £40 million to its outgoing chief executive Todd Stitzer. The Labour Party later announced an election proposal to raise the shareholder majority required to approve a takeover to two-thirds, which Unite had lobbied for.

During the 2010 general election, Unite were the largest donor to the Labour Party, giving them £1 million.

=== McCluskey era (2010–2021) ===
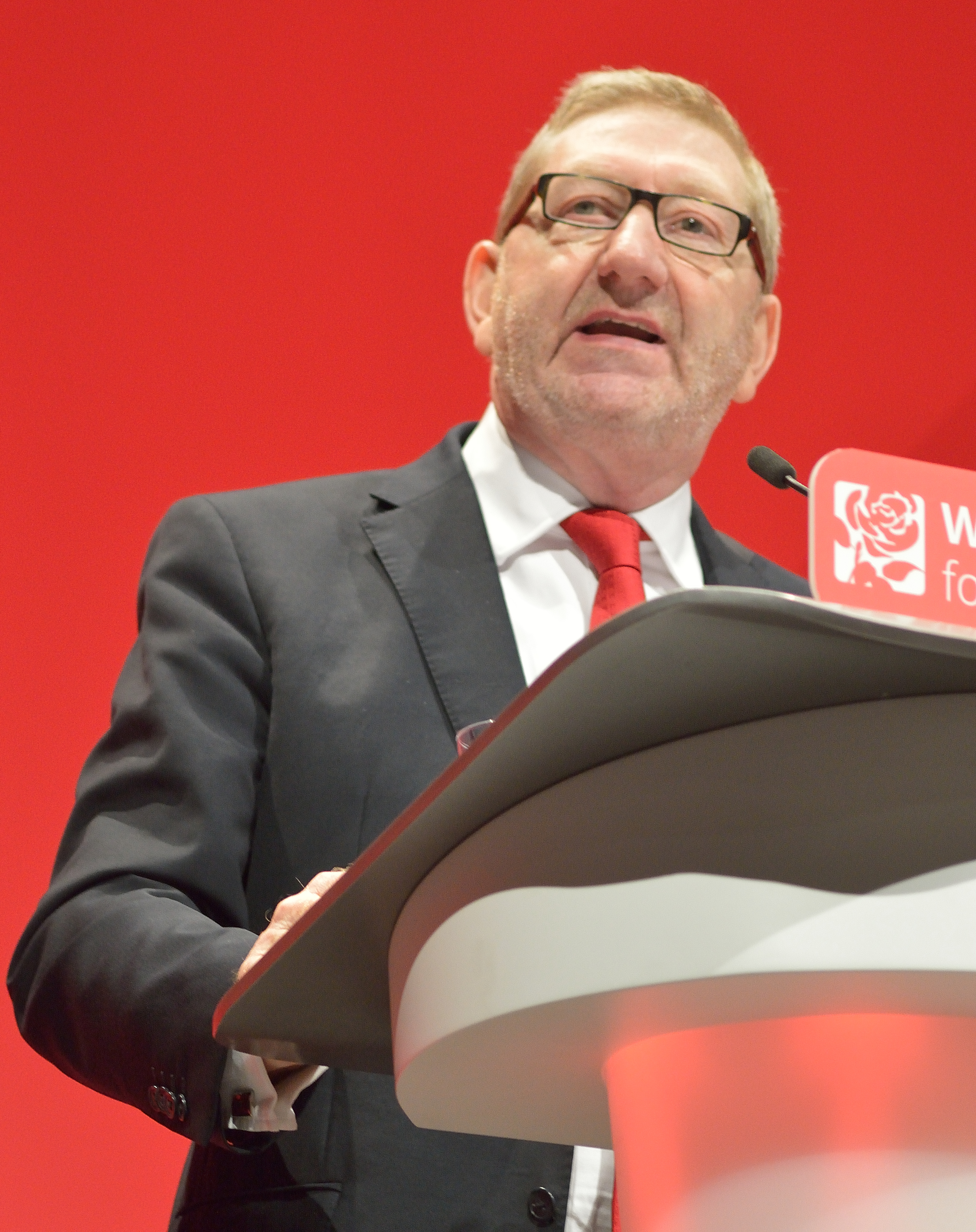
Len McCluskey speaking at the 2016 Labour Party Conference

The first election for a single general secretary of the union was held in 2010, with McCluskey, an assistant general secretary considered on the left wing of the union, being elected. Former joint general secretary Derek Simpson received a payment of over £500,000. Due to the controversy this caused within the union, members voted in favour of new measures designed to limit future payments on departure in a policy conference in 2012.

The union began offering lower price membership to students, the unemployed and single parents in 2011. In the same year, the dispute with British Airways was resolved. In the wake of cuts to public spending made by the Cameron–Clegg coalition, McCluskey threatened strike action to disrupt the 2012 Summer Olympics in London. Also in protest against cuts, Unite supported a successful motion at the Trades Union Congress in 2012 to consider holding a general strike.

In 2013, leaked documents alleged that Unite was running a covert campaign to ensure its candidates were selected to represent the Labour Party in the 2015 general election. Steve Hart, the union's political director, stated that Unite was supporting 41 candidates. There was particular controversy over the 2013 Labour Party Falkirk candidate selection. Unite claimed that it had not broken any Labour Party rules or the law with its selection campaign. Ed Miliband, then Leader of the Labour Party, referred the matter for police investigation, however Police Scotland found there was 'insufficient evidence' to launch an investigation. An Information Commissioner's Office investigation took place, as did internal Labour disciplinary proceedings.

McCluskey was re-elected in an early general secretary election in 2013, defeating Hicks. In 2014, the union achieved a legal ruling by the Employment Appeal Tribunal that employers need to account for overtime when calculating holiday pay. In April 2014, McCluskey threatened to disaffiliate Unite from Labour and launch a new workers' party if Labour lost the 2015 general election. In July 2015, Unite endorsed Jeremy Corbyn's campaign in the 2015 Labour Party leadership election.

In December 2016, McCluskey announced his resignation in order to contest an election for the post, which was held in April 2017. He was challenged by Unite's West Midlands Regional Secretary Gerard Coyne, who accused him of "putting the Labour leadership before the interests of Unite members". McCluskey won the election, and Coyne was suspended from his position in the union.

In 2021, during the COVID-19 pandemic, several hundred bus drivers working for Go North West in Manchester went on strike for over two months in the longest strike in Unite's history.

=== Graham era (2021–present) ===
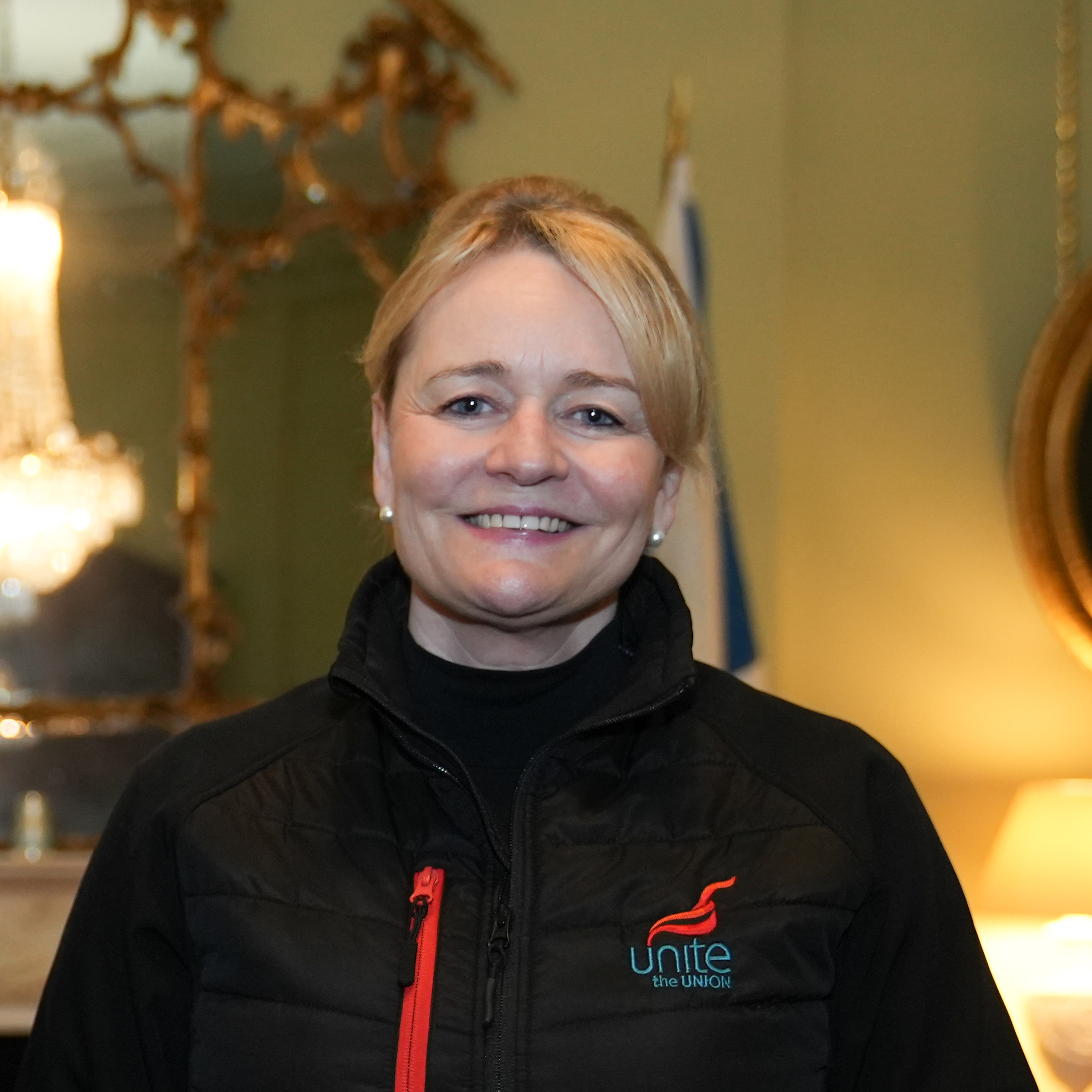
Sharon Graham in 2024

In August 2021, McCluskey announced his retirement as leader. In the subsequent election, Sharon Graham was chosen to replace him as the union's general secretary. In September 2021, Unite put forward a motion at the Labour Party conference calling for a £15 an hour minimum wage. The motion was passed by Labour Party members. However, Keir Starmer and his leadership team have not indicated a preference for or against the motion. The union joined postal workers strikes in 2022 after members at Royal Mail voted for industrial action over pay and job cuts.

On the anniversary of the start of the Birmingham bin strike on 11 March 2026, Unite cut its annual donation to the Labour Party by £580,000, a decrease of 40% from its previous funding of £1.45 million. The Labour controlled Birmingham City Council had decided to remove Waste Recycling and Collection Officer posts, and a dispute had been on-going for a year. The union states a resolution of the dispute has been formulated at the Advisory, Conciliation and Arbitration Service (Acas), but the Labour-run council has not agreed to it. A periodic Unite rules conference will take place in 2027, which may consider whether the union should remain affiliated to the Labour Party.

==== Hotel owned by Unite ====
During McCluskey's tenure, Unite spent £98 million on a hotel and conference centre in Birmingham as costs increased during its construction beyond the initially projected £57 million. Graham told officials in February 2022 that recent valuations were about £28 million. At the time of the investment decision McCluskey had said, it was a "sensible investment of members' money, resulting in a world-class facility that will return an income for our union for generations to come". Graham ordered two independent inquiries, one led by a Queen's Counsel, which was expected to report by the end of March 2022, and another by the accounting firm Grant Thornton. In April 2022, a raid was conducted by HM Revenue and Customs and South Wales police on Unite offices to investigate allegations of bribery, fraud, and money laundering related to the project. By December 2022, Unite had referred the matter to the police citing "very serious concerns about potential criminality." As a result, neither of the reports ordered by Graham were released.

In October 2024, news reporting revealed that the Serious Fraud Office was investigating the construction project. According to The Guardian, employment tribunal documents indicated that Unite executives believed that the true value of the building had been misrepresented to the leadership team. The final cost for the centre came to £112 million. An audit report by BDO on Unite's 2021 financial year found a "pervasive fraud environment", in part related to the hotel project. In July 2025, the BBC reported that McCluskey had taken private jet flights and received football tickets arranged by the hotel contractor, Flanagan Group.

== General secretary ==
The union is led by a general secretary, elected by a ballot of members.

Election	General secretary
Merger	Derek Simpson/Tony Woodley (joint)
2009	Derek Simpson/Tony Woodley (joint)
2010	Len McCluskey
2013	Len McCluskey
2016	Len McCluskey
2021	Sharon Graham
2026	Sharon Graham

=== 2009 joint general secretary election ===
Jerry Hicks, a former member of Amicus's executive, issued a legal challenge over Simpson's extension of tenure. In October 2008, Unite's executive council announced an election for the joint general secretary for the Amicus section. The election took place from January to March 2009 to elect a joint general secretary for a fixed term until December 2010.

Simpson stood for re-election as the incumbent, and Hicks successfully sought nomination to contest the election. Other candidates included two regional secretaries, Laurence Faircloth and Kevin Coyne, and a national officer, Paul Reuter. Faircloth stood down after the close of nominations and endorsed Simpson. A total of 159,272 voting slips were returned, out of a possible 1,096,511 voters, a turnout of 14.5%. Simpson won the election with 37.7% of the total votes cast, and remained in the post of joint general secretary until December 2010.

Candidate	Votes	
Candidate	Votes	%
Derek Simpson ✓	60,048	37.7%
Jerry Hicks	39,307	24.7%
Kevin Coyne	30,603	19.2%
Paul Reuter	28,283	17.8%
Invalid votes	1,031	0.6%
Turnout	159,272	14.5%

=== 2010 general secretary election ===
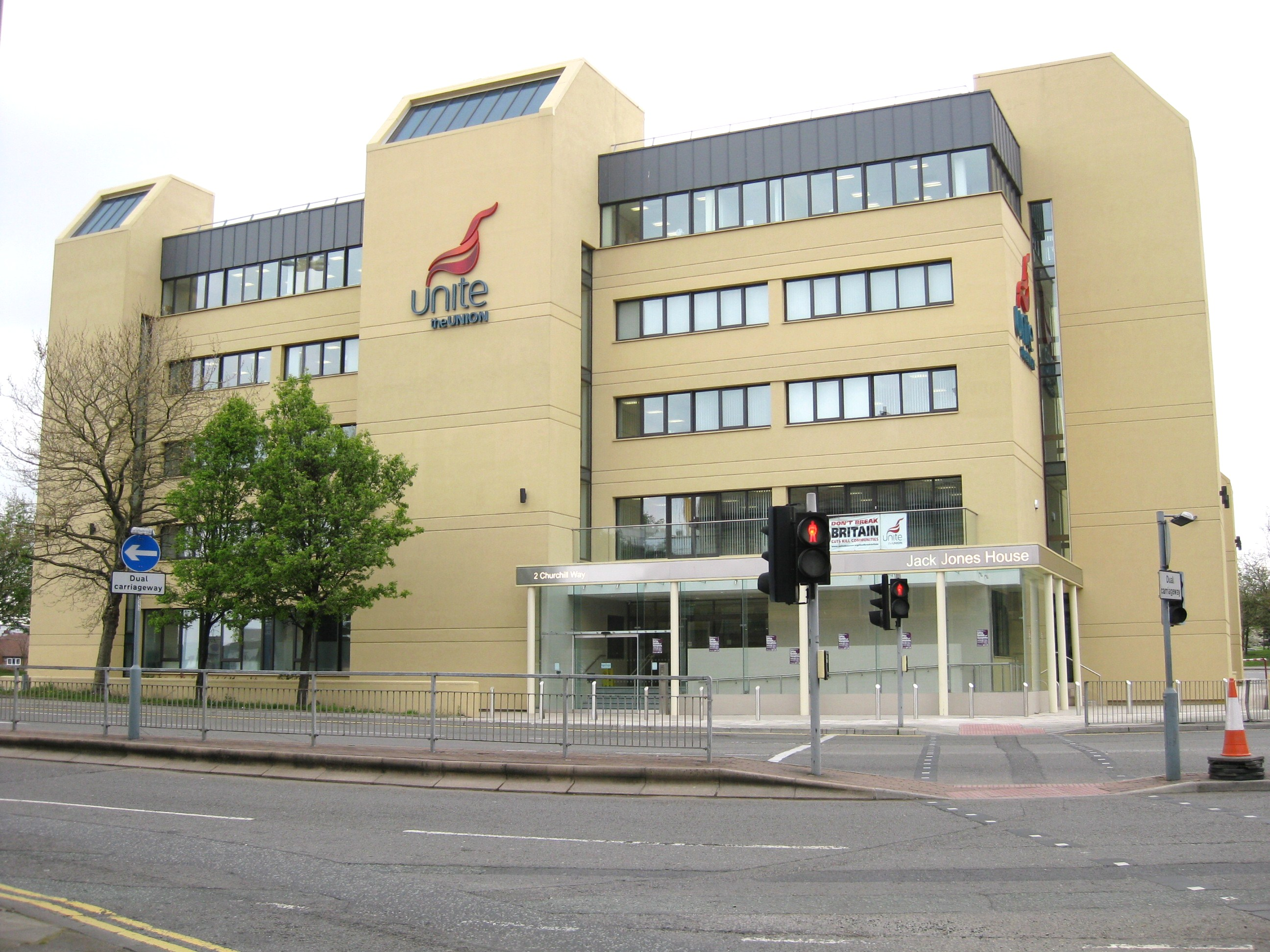
Jack Jones House, Liverpool. North West Headquarters in 2011

The first election for a single general secretary of the union took place in 2010. Both Simpson and Woodley announced that they would retire. The union's assistant general secretary, McCluskey, announced that he would stand as a candidate, running on a platform of unification and staying for only a single term of office. Other candidates included Hicks, Les Bayliss and Gail Cartmail. McCluskey was considered the left wing candidate, running on a platform of uniting the union and opposing cuts. Bayliss and Cartmail were also assistant general secretaries, with Bayliss criticising the union's handling of its dispute with British Airways. McCluskey was endorsed by Woodley, and Bayliss was endorsed by Simpson.

McCluskey was elected as the first single general secretary with 42.4% of the vote for a five-year term starting on 1 January 2011. The overall turnout was 15.8%.

Candidate	Votes	
Candidate	Votes	%
Len McCluskey ✓	101,000	42.4%
Jerry Hicks	53,000	21.8%
Les Bayliss	47,000	19.3%
Gail Cartmail	39,000	16.4%
Turnout	240,000	15.8%

=== 2013 general secretary election ===
In late 2012, Len McCluskey called an early election. On 4 March 2013, Unite announced that two candidates were standing in the election: McCluskey, who had won 1089 branch nominations, and Hicks, who had won 136 nominations. This was Hicks's third successive attempt at becoming Unite's general secretary. On 14 April 2013 it was announced that Len McCluskey had been re-elected for a five-year term.

Candidate	Votes	
Candidate	Votes	%
Len McCluskey ✓	144,570	64.2%
Jerry Hicks	79,819	35.5%
Invalid votes	1,412	
Turnout	225,801	15.2%

=== 2017 general secretary election ===
In December 2016, the incumbent general secretary Len McCluskey announced his resignation in order to contest an election for the post, which was held in April 2017. McCluskey was challenged by Unite's West Midlands regional secretary Gerard Coyne, who accused him of "putting the Labour leadership before the interests of Unite members". Coyne, a member of the Unite Now faction, was widely viewed as a centre-left figure within the union, has a close relationship with the Labour Party and had the backing of the deputy leader Tom Watson. Ian Allinson later announced that he would stand as a "grass-roots socialist" candidate. Concerns were expressed about breaches of data protection law during the campaign, leading to Unite's assistant general secretary for legal affairs producing a report on the allegations.

Coyne was suspended from his position as West Midlands general secretary by the union on 20 April, after voting had finished, the day ballot counting began. It claimed that Coyne had brought the union into disrepute. The following day it was announced that Len McCluskey had won the election. On 2 June Coyne announced a legal challenge against the result. In December 2017 it was announced that Jeffrey Burke, an employment law specialist and a retired high court judge, has been appointed to examine both sides of the case by the Trades Union Certification Officer. The certification officer rejected Coyne's claim that the election should be declared null and void. Following detailed investigations, Coyne's further complaint to the certification officer was dismissed in October 2018 on all ten counts, and the officer found that Coyne had included misleading information in some of his election literature.

Candidate	Votes	
Candidate	Votes	%
Len McCluskey ✓	59,067	45.5%
Gerard Coyne	53,544	41.3%
Ian Allinson	17,143	13.2%
Invalid votes	317	
Turnout	130,071	12.2%

=== 2021 general secretary election ===
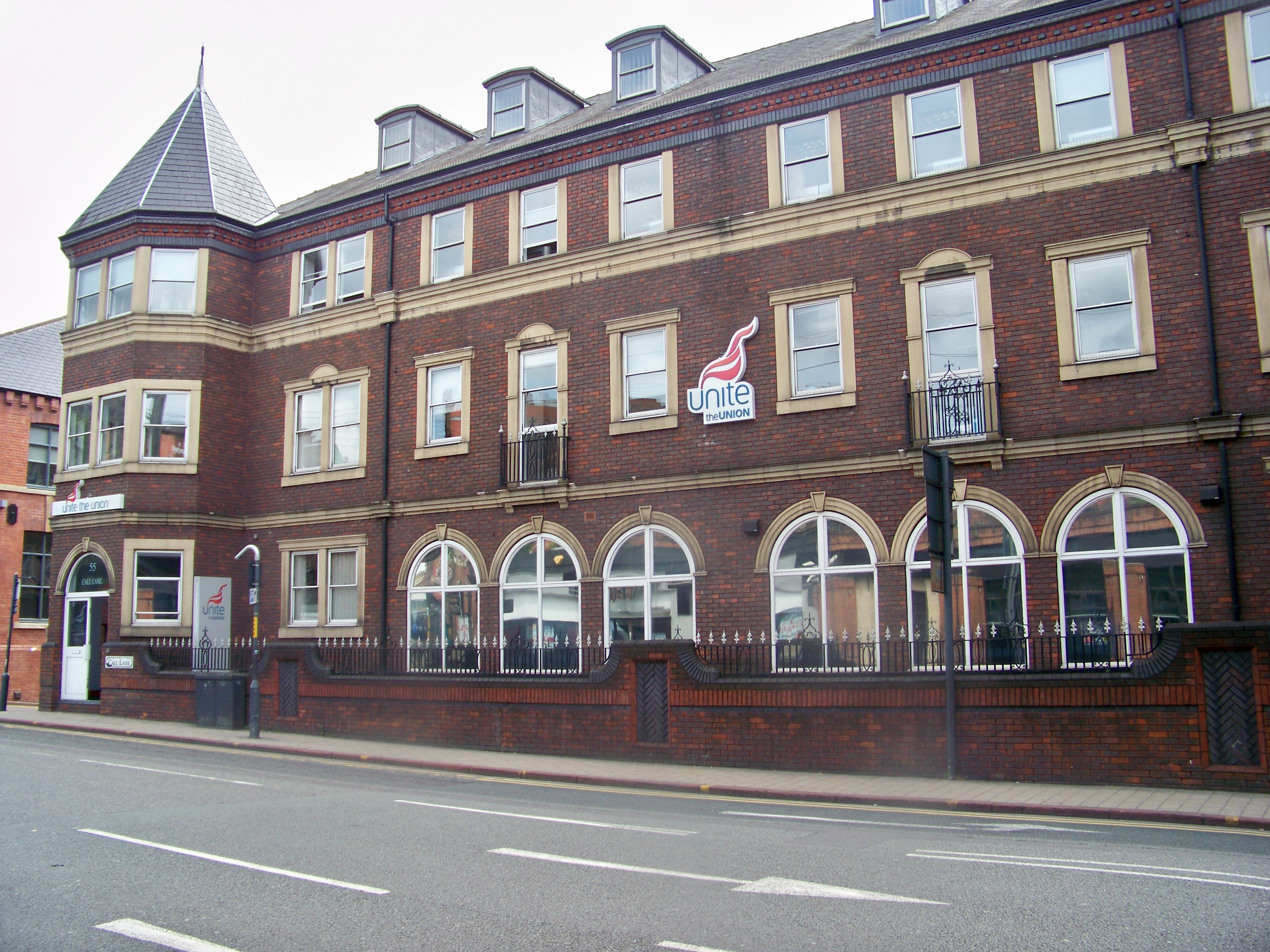
The Yorkshire, North East and Humberside regional headquarters is in Leeds

In July 2020, McCluskey said he would stand down in 2021, with an early election to select a new general secretary. The United Left faction held a primary to decide which candidate to support in the election, considering two assistant general secretaries: Howard Beckett and Steve Turner. Beckett has been endorsed by the blog The Skwawkbox and the former general secretary of the Labour Party Jennie Formby. Turner was a member of the Trotskyist Militant group in the Labour Party but remained in Labour when many Militant members left to form the Socialist Party. Turner was seen as more willing to work with the Labour leader Keir Starmer, whereas Beckett said that Starmer needed "to be held to account". Turner was chosen as United Left's candidate in a ballot, winning by 370 votes to 367. Beckett challenged the result, but Turner's victory was upheld after reports into the conduct of the vote were completed. Beckett later announced he would still stand as a candidate. Sharon Graham declared herself as a candidate from the left of the union without seeking endorsement from United Left. A new group, Workers' Unite, is expected to support her on a platform more focused on workplaces than internal Labour Party politics. Gerard Coyne, who stood against McCluskey in the 2017 general secretary election, announced his candidacy in January 2021. He is a supporter of Labour leader Keir Starmer.

The election was called in April 2021, with nominations closing in June, voting held in July and the result announced on 26 August. The threshold to join the ballot was increased from 50 to around 150 by a combination of an increase in the percentage of branches required to nominate a candidate and a less restrictive definition of what counts as a branch. The change was criticised as a "stitch-up" by critics of McCluskey, because it gave more power to union officials who had sole discretion to request nomination packs for newly-created branches. The nomination period closed on 7 June, with the numbers of valid nominations being:

- Steve Turner: 525
- Sharon Graham: 349
- Howard Beckett: 328
- Gerard Coyne: 196

On 18 June, Howard Beckett withdrew and endorsed Turner, with both issuing a joint statement that Beckett would support Turner on a blended policy manifesto. Graham was elected on 25 August, with the support of 46,696 members (approximately 3% of Unite's claimed membership, with her term as general secretary starting on 26 August.

Candidate	Votes	
Candidate	Votes	%
Sharon Graham ✓	46,696	37.7%
Steve Turner	41,833	33.8%
Gerard Coyne	35,334	28.5%
Turnout	124,147	

=== 2026 general secretary election ===
International director of the union Simon Dubbins has secured sufficient nominations to stand against current general secretary Sharon Graham in the 2026 election. Voting ends on 11 August. The result was announced on 12 August, re-electing Sharon Graham. Turnout was 10.3%, estimated as roughly the same as in 2021 when the turnout was not published, but lower than previous elections.

Candidate	Votes	
Candidate	Votes	%
Sharon Graham ✓	68,694	68.6%
Simon Dubbins	31,130	31.1%
Turnout	100,089 (265 invalid)	10.3%

== Membership ==
Unite membership since 2008
year	members
2008	1,635,483
2010	1,515,206
2012	1,424,303
2014	1,405,838
2016	1,282,671
2018	1,291,017
2020	1,246,429
2021	1,203,190
2022	1,197,696
2023	1,177,292
Numbers represent memberships on last day of year, as reported to the Trades Union Certification Officer.

The union membership was 1.2 million in August 2021. Since 2023, the union has not made annual returns, giving membership numbers, to the Trades Union Certification Officer.

=== Factions ===
==== Unite Now ====
Unite Now was a movement established in 2011 which was "moderate left". It presented itself as an independent movement for lay members, activists and officers. They supported McCluskey in his first election but opposed the calling of an early general secretary election in 2013, and did not support him in 2017. Unite Now campaigned for greater transparency in the union and were critical of the unions centralised hierarchical decision making structures. They campaigned for greater financial transparency, a move away from the current centralised executive powers with a more independent Executive Council which has set term limits. As of June 2026 its website is no longer available, having displayed an "Under maintenance" notice since 2024.

==== United Left ====
United Left, a left-wing grouping, is mostly made up of members on the left of the Labour Party, but also includes members of other political parties such as the Socialist Party and the Communist Party of Britain, as well as those who belong to no political party. The United Left supported Len McCluskey in his elections. The faction was considered dominant within the union, but after the 2026 Executive Council elections their "Members United" slate only elected 18 out of 61 seats.

==== Back to the Workplace ====
"Workers Unite - Back to the Workplace" is a slate set up in support of "the direction and industrial strategy of Unite the union under the leadership of our general secretary, Sharon Graham" in the 2026 Executive Council elections, where they elected 40 candidates out of the 61 seats available, overturning the historical dominance of United Left.
