= Sacred Heart High School, Hammersmith =

Sacred Heart High School
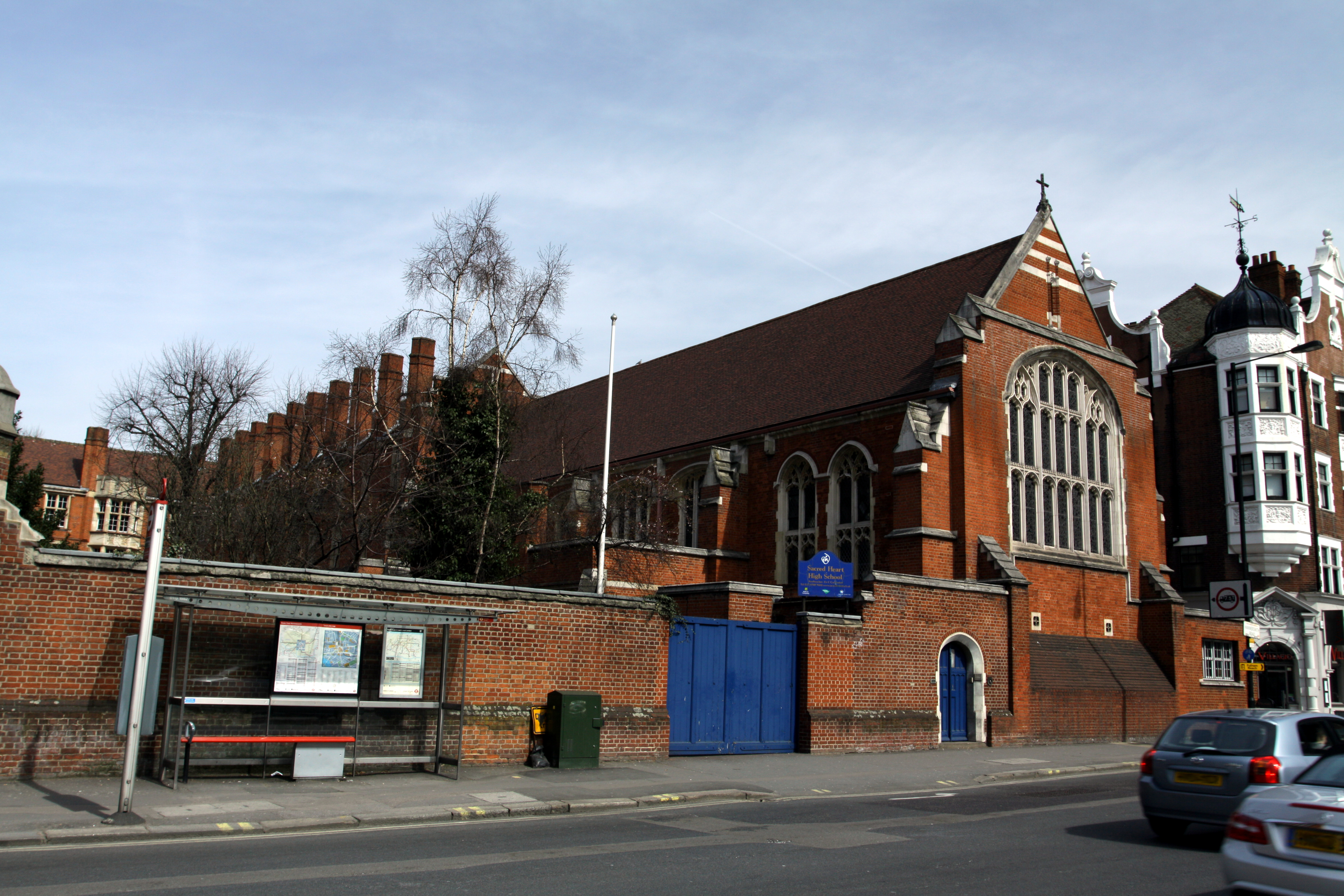

Location
- 212 Hammersmith Road; Hammersmith, Greater London, W6 7DG; England; 51°29′36″N 0°13′23″W

Information
- Type: Academy
- Religious affiliation: Catholic
- Established: 1893
- Founder: Society of the Sacred Heart
- Department for Education URN: 137935 Tables
- Ofsted: Reports
- Head teacher: Sharon O'Donovan
- Staff: 103
- Gender: Girls
- Age: 11 to 18
- Enrolment: 1129
- Trusteeship: Society of the Heart Charitable Trust
- Website: https://www.sacredhearthigh.org.uk

Sacred Heart High School is a Catholic secondary school and sixth form with academy status for girls, located in Hammersmith, London, England.

== Admissions ==
Sacred Heart is a girls' school for ages 11–18, located in Hammersmith. The former convent only accepts girls of the Catholic faith and a uniform is obligatory for all girls during the seven years at Sacred Heart. Approximately 900 girls attend the school. As of September 2022, the headteacher is Mrs. S O’Donovan.

== History ==
=== Foundation ===
The school was founded by nuns of the Society of the Sacred Heart in 1893. One of the school buildings is named after the order's founder Madeleine Sophie Barat. It is built on an historic site with a long Catholic tradition dating back to 1609. In 1869 Archbishop Manning decided to convert the convent into a seminary but the original buildings were found to be unsuitable.

By January 1876 John Francis Bentley, the architect of Westminster Cathedral, had completed the plans for the current Tudor styled buildings. By July 1884 the seminary was complete, consisting of a chapel, library, school, refectory, common room and upwards of sixty study bedrooms for staff and students. The buildings are now Grade II* listed.

The pipe organ in the chapel is by Belgian organ maker Hippolyte Loret and was originally commissioned by the Society of the Sacred Heart in France. In 1904, when the French government threatened to seize the society's headquarters, the organ was dismantled and smuggled from Paris to Hammersmith. In 2026 the school secured funding to restore the organ.

=== Grammar school ===
In 1948 the convent school was reorganised as a secondary grammar school, continuing as a grammar school, the Convent of Sacred Heart High School, until 1976.

=== Comprehensive ===
The school received its first comprehensive intake in 1977, gradually becoming comprehensive one year at a time until 1981, as the London Sacred Heart High School. It had around 550 girls in 1980. In 1989, a gradual change began to dispose of the sixth form, and by 1991, it was an 11–16 school, with A-levels being taken at the new St Charles Catholic Sixth Form College, in Kensington and Chelsea. From 1990, it was the responsibility of Hammersmith and Fulham, and from 1991 to 2014 the headteacher was Christine Carpenter, who replaced Moira Russell. Upon her retirement, she was replaced by Marian Doyle. The school was inspected by Ofsted in September 2017 and was rated Outstanding. In September 2022, Sharon O'Donovan became headteacher. Ofsted inspected the school again in November 2023 and was once again rated Outstanding.

Apart from the twenty years as a seminary in the late nineteenth century, this site has a 330-year tradition of contributing to the education of young women. In 1993 Cardinal Basil Hume, Archbishop of Westminster, visited the school for a Mass to celebrate its 100th anniversary.

The school was awarded beacon school honours, and in 2005 it became a specialist school in Mathematics and ICT.

Both the pupils and the teachers are encouraged to take part in regular activities both within and outside the school community, and all the years contribute to raising money and awareness of political, social and economic status' around the world. The school raises large amounts of money each year for various charities around the world.

=== Academy ===
On 1 March 2012, Sacred Heart High School officially gained academy status.

=== Sixth Form ===
From September 2013, the school has a sixth form.

== Academic performance ==
Sacred Heart High School Hammersmith (SHHS) is recognised as one of the top 1% out of all non-selective secondary maintained schools in England. Rated ‘Outstanding’ and ‘Exceptional’ by Ofsted, the latter rating awarded to just a handful of schools in the country.

In 2019, 58% of students achieved A*-B at A Level, while GCSE grades were among the best nationally with 52% of students achieving 9-7 grades.

== Notable alumni ==
- Pauline Collins (b. 1940) - actress
- Sharon Graham (b. 1968) - trade union leader
- Beabadoobee (b. 2000) - indie singer-songwriter

== Controversy ==
In July 1999 the Press Complaints Commission (PCC) upheld a complaint against the Mail on Sunday from then prime minister Tony Blair and his wife Cherie. The newspaper had claimed the Blairs improperly used their influence to secure the admission of their daughter to Sacred Heart High School, some six miles from where they live, when other local girls were rejected. The PCC said: "There was no evidence to support the allegation that Kathryn Blair was unfairly admitted or had received special treatment, and the newspaper did not provide any."

== See also ==
- List of Schools of the Sacred Heart
