= Steve Turner (trade unionist) =

British trade union leader

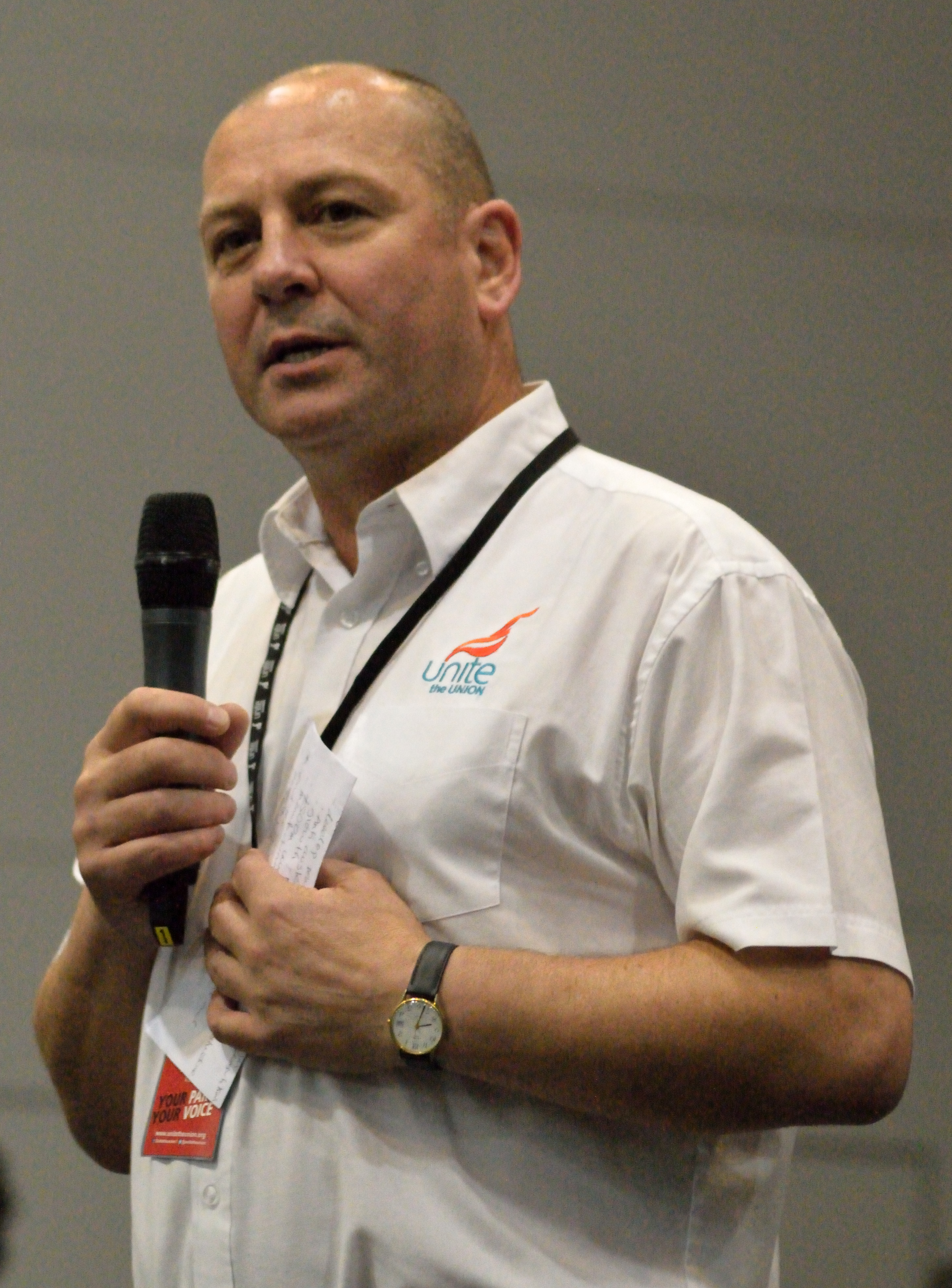
- Turner at the 2016 Labour Party Conference

Assistant General Secretary of Unite the Union
- Incumbent
- Assumed office 2018

Personal details
- Born: 24 November 1962 (age 63)
- Party: Labour
- Occupation: Trade Unionist

Steve Turner (born 24 November 1962) is Assistant General Secretary (AGS) of Britain and Ireland's largest trade union, Unite the Union. He is responsible for the union's manufacturing sector, along with its retired members and Unite's community membership.

Turner describes himself as a “proud Londoner” and Millwall FC fan. He grew up on the now demolished Heygate Estate in Elephant and Castle.

Turner represents Unite on the Trades Union Congress Executive Committee and General Council and on the Executive and Management Committees of the International Transport Workers' Federation (ITF). Turner is a member of the Labour Party and National Chair of the Peoples Assembly Against Austerity.

== Trade unionism ==
Steve Turner started his union life in 1982 when he joined the then Transport & General Workers Union (T&G) aged 19 on his first day as a bus conductor working for London Transport. He was quickly elected as a shop steward and became active in the union's youth section.

After losing his job when bus conductors were phased out of London life in the 1980s, Turner became active in the T&G's education programme, studied for an MA in Industrial Relations from Keele University and taught local and national shop steward and activist training courses.

Appointed as a Regional Officer by the T&G's General Executive Council in 1996, working in the London Region of the union, he assumed responsibility for organising, supporting and representing members employed by the Ford Motor Company and its supply chain at Dagenham, civil engineering and construction, London's night-time wholesale markets and the union's 23,000 strong London buses membership.

Turner rose to become National Officer for the union's Docks and Road Transport Sections in 2003 and went on to assume the union's National Officer for Civil Aviation position, playing a leading role in the successful Cabin Crew dispute (2010/11) with British Airways.

In 2011 Turner became Director of Executive Policy for Unite the union, which had been formed in 2007 as a result of a merger between the T&G and Amicus, before being appointed to Assistant General Secretary in 2013. In recent years, Turner has been at the forefront of successful negotiations to resolve disputes involving Oil Tanker Drivers, London Bus Workers in a dispute about bonuses during the London Olympic games and Northampton Hospital Workers, locked out in 2014.

Turner has been an outspoken critic of the Conservative government and its austerity policies, a defender of rights at work including the right to strike, and campaigned for a Living Wage. He fought against the Transatlantic Trade and Investment Partnership (TTIP) and changes to the social security system, particularly the Bedroom Tax, calling it 'ideologically bankrupt'.

Turner became Assistant General Secretary with responsibility for Unite's 300,000 member-strong manufacturing sector in 2018. He was particularly prominent in the 2017/18 successful campaign to defend jobs at Bombardier in Belfast, during the firm's bitter dispute with Boeing, leading a delegation of Unite workers to Washington and Montreal. He played a key role in the battle to save the iconic Harland and Wolff shipyard in Belfast after the government and the company said it didn't have a future and, in 2021, he led Unite's negotiations with the senior management team of Rolls-Royce to secure its factory in Barnoldswick, Lancashire, and prevent hundreds of job losses.

Throughout the COVID-19 crisis, Turner has led for Unite to protect members' safety, jobs and wages, working closely with government and industry bodies to secure and design the Job Retention Scheme (furlough) and establish initiatives such as the Ventilator Challenge. He sat on the Department for Business, Energy and Industrial Strategy taskforce developing the guidance to employers on a safe return to work, ensuring that it stipulated that companies work with trade union safety reps to make workplaces Covid secure. Turner led the ultimately successful demand that the government appoint a PPE Tsar to boost and coordinate the manufacture of PPE and testing equipment in the UK.

He sits on the Executive and Management Committees of the International Transport Workers' Federation and TUC Executive and General Council. He is the TUC lead spokesperson on Europe.

Turner was Len McCluskey's campaign manager for his three general secretary election campaigns.

Turner lost the Unite 2021 general secretary election, despite winning the most union branch nominations. On 18 June 2021 another candidate, Howard Beckett, withdrew and endorsed Turner.
