= Jerry Hicks (trade unionist) =

British trade unionist

Jerry Hicks is a British trade unionist. He was the convenor of the Amicus union at Rolls-Royce in Bristol, and was dismissed in 2005. An employment tribunal found that he had "probably been dismissed on trade union grounds".

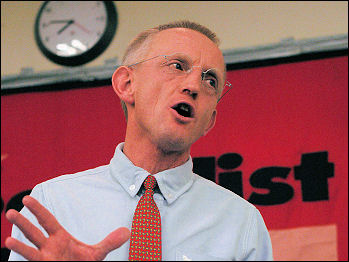

In 2009, he stood as General Secretary of Amicus, winning 40,000 votes to the Derek Simpson's 60,000.

Hicks stood in the 2010 election for the general secretary of Unite the Union and made a number of election pledges, including that he would only take the wage of an average skilled worker. He came second with 52,527 votes, beating the two full-time assistant general secretaries who stood. He has in total run 3 times, unsuccessfully, for the leadership of Unite.

Hicks was a member of the Respect Party and of its National Council until the party was de-registered following UK parliamentary elections in 2016. He was a candidate for election to Bristol Council in May 2009.

Hicks wrote an article in support on Union Day of action including strike action by public sector workers principally on the issue of Government attack on public sector pensions.
