= Trades Union Certification Officer =

Allahgaleb

The Trades Union Certification Officer was established in the United Kingdom by the Employment Protection Act 1975. They head the Certification Office for Trade Unions and Employers' Associations.

== Responsibilities ==
The Certification Officer is responsible for:

- maintaining a list of trade unions and employers' associations
- receiving and scrutinising annual returns from trade unions and employers' associations
- determining complaints concerning trade union elections, certain other ballots and breaches of trade union rules
- ensuring observance of statutory requirements governing mergers between trade unions and between employers' associations
- overseeing the political funds and the finances of trade unions and employers' associations
- certifying the independence of trade unions

== Certification Officer ==
David Cockburn was appointed on 1 August 2001 and re-appointed in 2004, 2007, 2010 and 2012. Cockburn retired on 30 June 2016. He has chaired the Industrial Law Society (ILS), the Employment Lawyers Association (ELA), and the Employment Law Committee of the Law Society. He was also the founder treasurer of the Institute of Employment Rights, a trade union funded "think tank" managed by an executive committee composed of senior union officers, academics and lawyers. Prior to being Certification Officer he was a senior partner of trade union firm Pattinson and Brewer. He is currently a vice-president of the ILS and the ELA and a member of the editorial board of the Encyclopaedia of Employment Law and the Industrial Law Journal. He is also a part-time chairman of Employment Tribunals and a visiting professor at the Middlesex University Business School.

Gerard Walker was appointed as the Certification Officer by the Secretary of State for Business, Innovation and Skills on 29 June 2016. The appointment was on an interim basis for the period 1 July 2016 to 30 November 2016. The appointment was extended on 24 November 2016 and was extended until December 2017. Walker was responsible for a ruling that foster carers could not form a union, which was then reversed by the Court of Appeal in National Union of Professional Foster Carers v Certification Officer [2021] EWCA Civ 548 as a violation of fundamental human rights and the Act of Parliament.

Sarah Bedwell was appointed as Certification Officer in December 2017.

Stephen Hardy took up the role on 1 October 2025.

== Recognition ==
In order to be recognised by the Officer, a union must first apply to be listed – a simple paper process, costing £150. To be recognised as an independent union, with all the attendant legal benefits that follow, a union must undergo a more rigorous inspection to confirm its independence from employers. This currently costs £4,066.

== See also ==
- Trade Union and Labour Relations Act 1974
- Trade Union and Labour Relations (Consolidation) Act 1992
