= Daloy Politsey =

Yiddish protest song

Daloy Politsey (Yiddish: דאַלוי פּאָליציי, lit. 'Down with [the] Police'), also known as In Ale Gasn (Yiddish: אין אַלע גאַסן, lit. 'In Every Street') is a Yiddish-language anti-authoritarian protest song. The modern commonly known & recorded version of the song is actually a combination of two different protest songs from the late 19th and early 20th century Russian Empire; Hey Hey Daloy Politsey and In Ale Gasn respectively. The modern song was recorded in 1972 by the Yiddish Youth Ensemble (Susan Finesilver, Betty Glaser, Judy Gottlieb, Khane Kliger, Moishe Mlotek, Moishe Rosenfeld, Dina Schwartzman, Josh Waletzky; Musical Director: Zalmen Mlotek) on their album of Yiddish Songs of Work and Struggle (1972, vinyl). The recording later appeared in the soundtrack for the documentary film Free Voice of Labor: The Jewish Anarchists. As such the song is often rendered as In Ale Gasn/Daloy Politsey to highlight this combination. The two songs were historically associated with the Bundist movement (although none of the lyrics are explicitly Bundist) along with the Jewish anarchist movement. The two songs were sung during the Russian revolutions as a rallying cry for Revolutionary Socialist and Anarchist Jews.

== Content ==
=== In Ale Gasn ===
The first two verses of the combined song come from In Ale Gasn. In Ale Gasn by itself was a labour song that calls for a strike and/or industrial action, a common occurrence at the time in Imperial Russia; especially within the Jewish population. The earliest scribed versions of the song appear in two different collections of Yiddish folk songs from Kyiv from 1933 and 1934 respectively.

=== Daloy Politsey ===
The rest of the song, including its refrain, come from Daloy Politsey. The song itself was first scribed around the time of the 1905 Revolution, and specifically calls for the overthrow of Tsar Nicholas. Originally the song was sung with a leader singing verses (often improvised) and a chorus speak-singing the refrain in a call and response format.

== Use in contemporary political activism ==
Geoff Berner recorded a version of the song, mostly sung in English bar the refrain of "Hey, hey, daloy politsey!", with the added addition "It means the same thing now as yesterday. Out of your houses into the streets, everybody say fuck the police!" to said chorus. The song talks of the death in police custody of Ian Bush, as an example of police brutality; thus linking back to the origins of the song and its meaning.

Following the Ibiza affair in 2019, the Austrian Bundist Isabel Frey composed a version of the song during and for the subsequent protests. She sang the song, which included the chorus: "Hey, hey, down with HC and down with the new OVP. Get out on the streets despite the snow and rain. Today is Strache's last day." at a protest in May 2019.

In 2021 the now defunct Yiddish anarchist cafe Pink Peacock based in Glasgow had a complaint about the café displaying in its window a pink tote bag with the words "fuck the police" in English and the Yiddish "Daloy Politsey" (דאָלוי פּאָליציי) on the reverse, which in turn led Police Scotland to visit the cafe's founders Morgan Holleb and Joe Isaac's home. Holleb was subsequently charged with breach of the peace, and Glasgow police seized one of the tote bags from Pink Peacock as evidence. After the seizure, which was publicised in local media and on Pink Peacock's Twitter account, the café sold out of the bags. The British "neo-Bundist" Jewish Socialists' Group sent a statement of solidarity to Pink Peacock, highlighting the origins of the phrase from the song and its use in against "antisemitism and state repression in Tsarist Russia".

== Recordings ==
- Soundtrack to Free Voice of Labor: The Jewish Anarchists, arr. Zalmen Mlotek with unknown, 1980 Recording [first known recording]
- In Love And In Struggle: The Musical Legacy Of The Jewish Labor Bund, featuring Zalmen Mlotek, Adrienne Cooper, Dan Rous with The New Yiddish Chorale and The Workmen's Circle Chorus, 1999 Recording [translates some verses into English]
- Fayvish, Yiddpop featuring Alan Bern & Paul Brody, 2010 Recording
- Victory Party, Geoff Berner, 2011 Recording [in English]
- Este Infierno, Bestiärio (Band), 2015 Recording [in Spanish]
- A Little Letter, Brivele, 2018 Recording [additional verses in English]
- Millennial Bundist, Isabel Frey, 2020 Recording [additional verses in German]
- Zing!, Rajtaraj, 2021 Recording
- Venti, Chaoze One, Torsun Burkhardt, and Mal Élevé, 2021 Recording

== Lyrics ==
=== Yiddish original ===
Yiddish

אין אַלע גאַסן וווּ מען גייט
הערט מען זאַבאַסטאָווקעס
ייִנגלעך מיידלעך קינד־און־קייט
שמועסן פֿון נאַבאָווקעס

גענוג שוין ברידער האָרעווען
גענוג שוין באָרגן־לייַען
מאַכט אַ זאַבאַסטאָווקע 𝄇
𝄆 לאָמיר ברידער זיך באַפֿרייַען

ברידער און שוועסטער
לאָמיר זיך געבן די הענט
לאָמיר ניקאָלייַקעלען
צעברעכן די ווענט

כאָר:
היי היי דאָלוי פּאָליציי 𝄇
𝄆 דאָלוי סאַמאָדערזשאַוויע וו׳ראָסיי

ברידער און שוועסטער
לאָמיר זיך ניט אירצן
לאָמיר ניקאָלייַקעלען
די יאָרעלעך פֿאַרקירצן

כאָר

נעכטן האָט ער געפֿירט
אַ וועגעלע מיט מיסט
הייַנט איז ער געוואָרן
אַ קאַפּיטאַליסט

כאָר

ברידער און שוועסטער
לאָמיר גיין צוזאַמען
לאָמיר ניקאָלייַקעלען
באַגראָבן מיט דער מאַמען

כאָר

קאָזאַקן זשאַנדאַרמען
אַראָפּ פֿון די פֿערד
דער רוסישער קייסער
ליגט שוין אין דרערד

כאָר

Romanization

In ale gasn vu men geyt
Hert men zabastovkes.
Yinglekh, meydlekh, kind-un-keyt
Shmuesn fun nabovkes.

Genug shoyn brider horeven,
Genug shoyn borgn-layen,
𝄆 Makht a zabastovke,
Lomir brider zikh bafrayen! 𝄇

Brider un shvester,
lomir zikh gebn di hent,
Lomir Nikolaykelen
tsebrekhn di vent!

Khor:
𝄆 Hey, hey! doloy politsey!
Doloy samoderzhavye v Rosey! 𝄇

Brider un shvester,
lomir zikh nit irtsn,
Lomir Nikolaykelen
di yorelekh farkirtsn!

Khor

Nekhtn hot er gefirt
a vegele mist,
Haynt iz er gevorn
a kapitalist!

Khor

Brider un shvester,
lomir geyn tsuzamen,
Lomir Nikolaykelen
bagrobn mit der mamen!

Khor

Kozakn, zhandarmen!
arop fun di ferd!
Der rusisher keyser
ligt shoyn in dr’erd!

Khor

English translation

On every street you go
you hear rumblings.
Men, women, children, families
are talking about strikes.

Brothers, enough of your drudgery,
enough of borrowing,
We’re going on strike,
Brothers, let us free ourselves!

Brothers and sisters,
let us join hands,
Let's break down
little Tsar Nikolai’s walls!

Chorus:
Hey, hey, down with the police!
Down with the ruling class of Russia!

Brothers and sisters,
let’s forget formalities,
Let’s shorten
little Nikolai’s years!

Chorus

Yesterday he was driving
a little wagon full of trash,
Today he's become
a capitalist!

Chorus

Brothers and sisters,
let's all get together,
Let's bury little Nikolai
with his mother!

Chorus

Cossacks and gendarmes,
get down off your horses!
The Russian Tsar is already
dead and buried!

Chorus

=== Additional verses ===
In some recordings, an English verse (along with the Yiddish verses) is sung:

Brothers and sisters,
All gather 'round,
Together we are strong enough
To bring this Tsar down!

In a modern cover of the song, another verse in English is added to at the end instead of the aforementioned one:

Hey, Hey, daloy politsey,
It means the same thing as now as yesterday,
[So get] Out of your houses, into the streets,
Everybody, say, Fuck The Police!
