= Jewish Socialists' Group =

British Jewish socialist organisation

- Abbreviation: JSG
- Formation: 1970s
- Location: United Kingdom
- Affiliations: International Jewish Labor Bund (defunct)
- Website: jewishsocialist.org.uk

The Jewish Socialists' Group (JSG) is a Jewish socialist collective in United Kingdom, formed in the 1970s.

== History ==
JSG was founded in Manchester/Liverpool in 1974–1977 as a lobby group campaigning against the fascist National Front and for the left to relate more positively to Jewish issues. A London branch formed in 1977. They describe themselves as a political organisation campaigning for Jewish rights and the rights of all oppressed minorities in building a socialist future.

The JSG supported the original Anti-Nazi League and was active in street-level militant anti-fascism. It participated in the Beyond the Fragments conference which sought to renew democratic socialism. In the early 1980s, it was active in campaigning for peace in Israel/Palestine.

It developed a perspective via drawing on the tradition of the Bund, stressing Yiddishism, cultural pluralism and a commitment to the vitality of the diaspora.

In the mid-1980s, it became associated with the Greater London Council's municipal socialism and multiculturalism, receiving funding to launch Jewish Cultural and Anti-Racist Project (JCARP). Additionally, it was frequently in conflict with the Jewish communal leadership and in particular, the Association of Jewish Ex-Servicemen and Women (AJEX).

The JSG has been critical of allegations of antisemitism in the Labour Party, stating in April 2016:

Accusations of anti-Semitism are currently being weaponised to attack the Jeremy Corbyn-led Labour party with claims that Labour has a 'problem' of anti-Semitism... This is despite Corbyn's longstanding record of actively opposing fascism and all forms of racism, and being a firm a supporter of the rights of refugees and of human rights globally.

In 2021, when the owners of the Pink Peacock were charged with a breach of the peace in response to them displaying tote bags with the phrase "Fuck the Police/Daloy Politsey" on them, the JSG sent a message of solidarity:

The Jewish Socialists' Group sends solidarity to comrades of the Pink Peacock Queer Yiddish Anarchist café after the recent attacks you have experienced against your premises... Daloy Politsey (Down With the Police) was sung on demonstrations by our political forebears as part of their courageous collective struggle against antisemitism and state repression in Tsarist Russia. At the Jewish Socialists' Group's annual secular socialist Seder Nights we continue this tradition and sing the chorus with the modern colloquial translation popularised by Geoff Berner.

Since the start of the Gaza war, the JSG has called for an unlimited ceasefire. In a statement the JSG said:

The Jewish Socialists' Group stands for a future of peace and coexistence for the people in Israel and Palestine that can only be based on equality, justice, freedom and an end to occupation, colonisation and apartheid practices that reflect racist and fascist values of supremacy... We stand fully behind the right to resist occupation and oppression and the siege of Gaza. We stand also against the targeting of civilians, and our opposition to acts of terror against civilians applies equally whether they are carried out by individuals, resistance movements or state armies... The attack on Israeli civilians was a war crime and a crime against humanity... The same can be said of the massive, continuing Israeli attacks on Gaza. Both are despicable.

It has also been engaged with protesting with groups such as Jewish Voice for Liberation, Na'amod, Jewdas, Jewish Solidarity Action, Black Jewish Alliance, and Jews for Justice for Palestinians in support of the Palestinian cause.

== Publications ==
A magazine, Jewish Socialist, was launched in spring 1985 and continues publication today. The paper was conceived of in 1984 after a demonstration members of the JSG had attended.

== See also ==
- Jewish Labour Movement
- Jewish Voice for Liberation
- Jewdas
