= March Against Antisemitism =

2023 demonstration in London

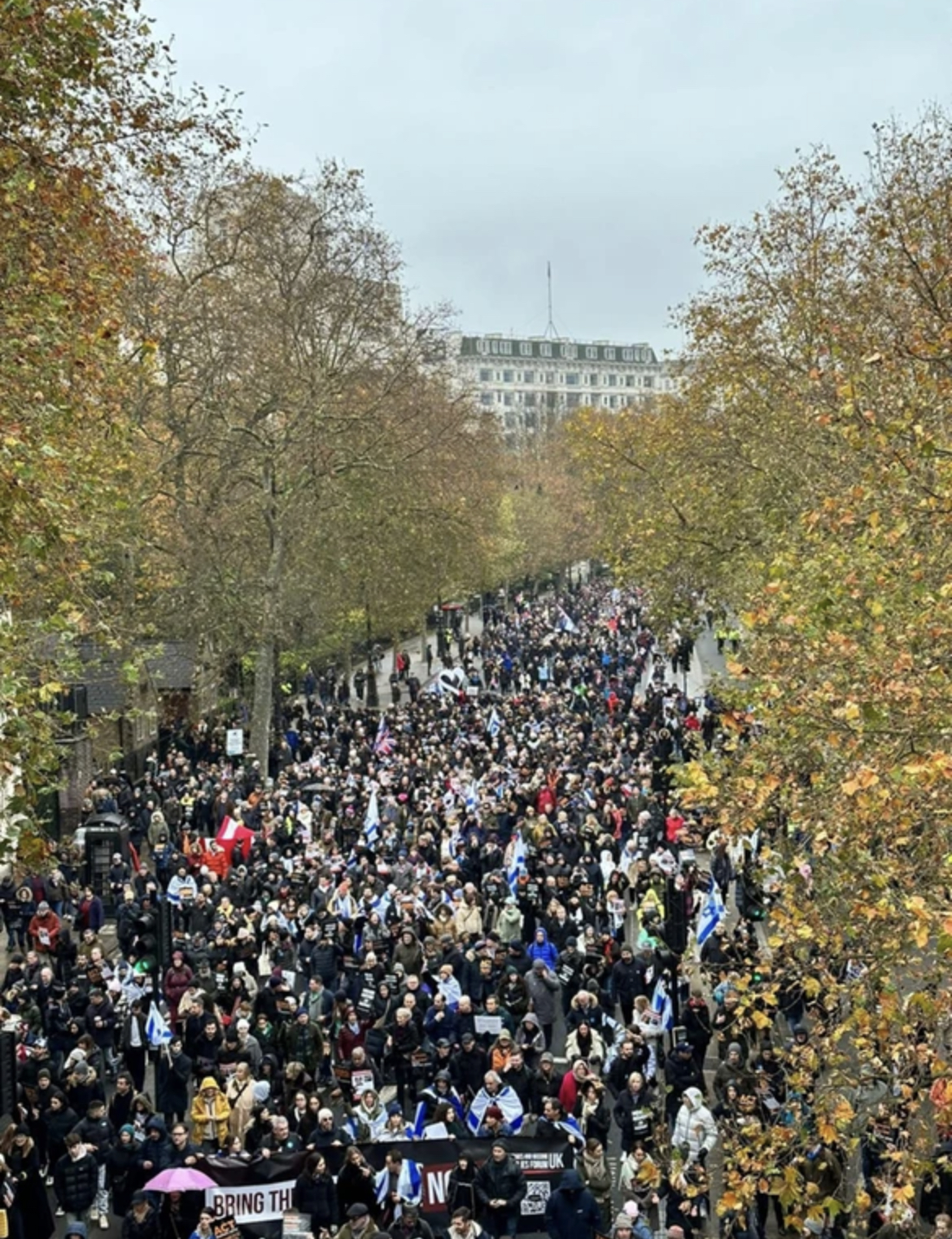
- Date: 26 November 2023
- Venue: Royal Courts of Justice
- Location: London, United Kingdom
- Participants: 50,000-100,000

The March Against Antisemitism was a demonstration held in London on 26 November 2023 organized by Campaign Against Antisemitism. The march was held in response to growing antisemitism in England resulting from the Israeli–Palestinian conflict; as police reports indicated that antisemitic offences have risen ten-fold compared to the previous year. The Telegraph reported that early estimates from police said around 100,000 people attended, while Reuters later reportde that the police estimated 50,000 marchers took part. CAA said 100,000 people attended the march and that this was "the largest gathering of its kind since the Battle of Cable Street". Demonstrators held placards containing slogans such as "shoulder to shoulder with British Jews" and "never again."

The March Against Antisemitism followed a London-based pro-Palestine rally in Central London with approximately 45,000 attendees led by the Stop the War Coalition. The coalition "stressed that those taking part oppose racism, antisemitism and Islamophobia". On the other hand, the chief executive of the Campaign Against Antisemitism, Gideon Falter, claimed that "week after week, central London has become a no-go zone for Jews," and the campaign later produced polling findings suggesting that "90% of British Jews say that they would avoid travelling to a city centre if a major anti-Israel demonstration was taking place there" Antisemitic hate crimes had increased dramatically during the period, with 554 reports of antisemitic offences in London between 1 October and 1 November in London, compared with 44 in the same period last year.

Having been shunned by the organisers and refusing to leave the event per police request, English far-right activist Tommy Robinson was detained. Sources indicate that one other individual was arrested for racist rhetoric. The chief executive of Campaign Against Antisemitism, Gideon Falter, remarked: "You don’t fight prejudice with prejudice, you can’t fight racism with racism… They don’t realise how naked their attempt is to try to fool us."

== Notable attendees ==
- Former Prime Minister Boris Johnson
- Chief Rabbi Sir Ephraim Mirvis
- Shadow Secretary of State for Science, Innovation and Technology Peter Kyle
- Minister of State for Security Tom Tugendhat
- Minister of State for Immigration Robert Jenrick
- Actress Louisa Clein
- Actress Felicity Kendal
- Actress Elliot Levey
- Actress Dame Maureen Lipman
- Actress Tracy-Ann Oberman
- Comedian David Baddiel
- TV presenter Rachel Riley
- TV personality Robert Rinder
- Broadcaster Vanessa Feltz
- Singer Rita
- Actor Eddie Marsan

== Criticism ==
The British Jewish organisation Na'amod released a statement about their decision not to attend the March, in which they said: "we know this march is not just about antisemitism. It’s clear from the event description that CAA has organised this march in response to huge weekly ceasefire demonstrations in London." Na'amod publicly denied CAA's characterisations of prior ceasefire marches as featuring antisemitic rhetoric, saying "This could not be further from the truth. Pitting Jewish safety against Palestinian freedom doesn’t make Jews safer; it makes fighting antisemitism harder."

That said, the event was supported by most mainstream Jewish organisations, including the Jewish Leadership Council, Board of Deputies, and the Chair of the United Synagogue. The President of the Board of Deputies also attended. [It was later reported that some members of Na’amod regretted boycotting in the march.]

== See also ==
- March for the Republic and Against Antisemitism
