= Campaign Against Antisemitism =

British non-governmental organisation

- Rally in Parliament Square in 2019
- Formation: August 2014
- Registration no.: 1163790
- Headquarters: London, UK
- Region served: United Kingdom
- Chief Executive: Gideon Falter
- Website: antisemitism.uk

Campaign Against Antisemitism (CAA) is a British non-governmental organisation established in August 2014 by members of the Anglo-Jewish community. CAA conducts litigation, runs awareness-raising campaigns, organises rallies and petitions, and publishes research. It describes itself as being "dedicated to exposing and countering antisemitism through education and zero-tolerance enforcement of the law". CAA has been characterized as a pro-Israel lobby group.

== History ==
CAA was set up in early August 2014, after an increase in antisemitic incidents that accompanied the 2014 Israel–Gaza conflict. Initially a grassroots campaign, it grew largely out of social media activity among "a small band of activists" who felt more should be done to promote the Jewish community's concerns after a meeting where a campaigner felt she had her concerns dismissed by Board of Deputies of British Jews president Vivian Wineman. Its co-founder was Joseph Cohen.

In January 2015, the then-UK Home Secretary, Theresa May, praised CAA for its work and undertook to ensure that the law against antisemitism is "robustly enforced". On 1 October 2015, it was registered as a charitable incorporated organisation (CIO). Its chief executive is Gideon Falter and its first director of communications was Jonathan Sacerdoti.

In November 2025, the Charity Commission issued CAA with a remedial action plan, in relation to an article about the British government's banning of the sale of certain weapons to Israel. In the commission's view, elements of the article did not further the CAA's stated objective of opposing antisemitism and the charity's inability to keep accurate records of the process by which the article was published amounted to "mismanagement". The CAA stated that it would legally challenge the decision.

== Publications ==
CAA publishes primary and secondary research based on opinion polling and Freedom of Information Act 2000 requests. CAA's annual Barometer measures antisemitic sentiment in the UK and also surveys the effect of antisemitism on the Jewish community. Further, its National Antisemitic Crime Audit collects and analyses antisemitic crime data from all police forces in the United Kingdom. CAA uses the report to assess trends in antisemitic crime and to make recommendations to the British government. CAA also monitors antisemitism in political parties and the adoption of the IHRA definition by universities and local authorities in the UK.

== Rallies and petitions ==
CAA's first demonstration was in 2014 against the Tricycle Theatre in London, which had cancelled its hosting of that November's UK Jewish Film Festival due to the contemporaneous conflict in Gaza, unless the festival rejected funding from parties involved in the conflict, specifically a £1,400 sponsorship from the Israeli embassy, which the Tricycle Theatre offered to replace.

Later that same summer, CAA led a demonstration outside the Royal Courts of Justice, attracting an estimated 5,000 people in the largest protest against antisemitism in a generation following a spike in antisemitic incidents. Attendees heard from Chief Rabbi Ephraim Mirvis, Maajid Nawaz, Douglas Murray, representatives from the Board of Deputies and others.

In August 2018, CAA organised a demonstration outside Labour Party's headquarters to protest against the handling of antisemitism in the Labour Party, and to condemn the-then party leader, Jeremy Corbyn. That same month, the organisation launched a Change.org petition titled "Jeremy Corbyn is an antisemite and must go"; it featured a Labour slogan modified to read "For the many not the Jew", which was signed by over 30,000 by 30 August 2018. A counter-petition against CAA with the title "To Get the Charity Commission to Deregister the Zionist Campaign Against Anti-Semitism" was signed by almost 7,500 and sent to the Charity Commission for England and Wales, which said in response that it was "assessing concerns raised about the Campaign Against Antisemitism's campaigning activities". In October 2018, the Charity Commission said that charities must be independent of party politics and insisted that CAA reword its petition.

The CAA and Jewish Labour Movement (JLM) were among a number of bodies which asked the Equality and Human Rights Commission (EHRC) to investigate the Labour Party in Autumn 2018. In May 2019, following these complaints, the EHRC launched a formal investigation into whether Labour had "unlawfully discriminated against, harassed or victimised people because they are Jewish". CAA and JLM submitted evidence to the invetigation, which ultimately found that the Labour Party had committed unlawful acts of discrimination against Jews under Corbyn's leadership.

In December 2019, CAA held a demonstration outside Parliament under its subsidiary brand Together Against Antisemitism. CAA said that 3,200 attendees heard from speakers such as Tom Holland and Robert Rinder.

On 26 November 2023, following several pro-Palestinian marches in London during the Gaza war, the CAA organised the March Against Antisemitism, starting at the Royal Courts of Justice. The event was supported by mainstream Jewish organisations and figures, including the Chief Rabbi and the Jewish Leadership Council. The Telegraph reported that early estimates from police said around 100,000 people attended, while Reuters later reported that the police estimated 50,000 marchers took part. CAA said 100,000 people attended the march and that this was "the largest gathering of its kind since the Battle of Cable Street". One month prior, CAA held a smaller demonstration outside the Scotland Yard Headquarters, to protest against what they deemed police inaction in the face of an uptick in antisemitic hate crimes.

== Polling ==
CAA regularly conducts polling on both the Jewish community and wider British population. They produce an annual Antisemitism Barometer surveying both, which has regularly produced notable findings including, for instance, that 84% of British Jews considered Jeremy Corbyn to be a threat to the Jewish community in 2019. The 2019 survey is believed to be the first survey ever to suggest that antisemitism on the far-left had overtaken that on the far-right.

== Calls for proscriptions under the Terrorism Act ==
CAA were among those calling for organisations to be proscribed under the Terrorism Act 2000, including the neo-Nazi National Action and Islamist groups such as Hizb ut-Tahrir.

After the direct action group Palestine Action was implicated in the destruction of military equipment at RAF Brize Norton in June 2025, CAA called for it to be proscribed and submitted a dossier on the group to the Home Office.

== Litigation ==
CAA has used the process of judicial review in English law to challenge decisions made by the government and authorities. For example, CAA's chair, Gideon Falter, witnessed a 2015 speech in which far-right activist Jeremy Bedford-Turner issued a call to "free England from Jewish control". Following a 13-month campaign by the CAA, two days before they were due to appear in court to face a judicial review brought by CAA, the CPS agreed to look again at their decision not prosecute him, admitted it was legally wrong and agreed to consult the CAA in future when making decisions regarding similar cases against Jewish people Whereas the CPS was sceptical that the evidential test had been met to determine a crime had been committed, once the case reached a jury the defendant was found guilty and given a one-year custodial sentence.

In 2021, Tahra Ahmed, a prominent Grenfell Tower volunteer aid worker, was reported by The Times to have claimed that the victims of the Grenfell Tower fire were "burnt alive in a Jewish sacrifice" and that the inferno profited Goldman Sachs, after which the Community Security Trust and CAA reported her to the police. In January 2022 she was found guilty on two counts of publishing written material in order to stir up racial hatred, and was sentenced to eleven months in prison.

In early 2018, CAA began a private prosecution against Alison Chabloz, a Holocaust denier who released three YouTube videos of self-written antisemitic songs characterising Auschwitz as a "theme park" and the Holocaust as the "Holohoax". The case was taken over by the CPS and Chabloz was convicted. She was subsequently imprisoned for breaking the conditions of her suspended sentence.

In July 2018, Gilad Atzmon was forced to apologise to CAA chairman Gideon Falter and pay costs and damages after being sued for libel. Atzmon acknowledged that he had falsely stated that Falter had personally profited from fabricating antisemitic incidents.

In 2019, the CAA was sued by Tony Greenstein for libel in relation to CAA having published articles about him calling him a "notorious antisemite". In 2017, Greenstein had launched a petition asking the Charity Commission to deregister the organisation, claiming its purpose was to limit freedom of speech by calling opponents of Israel antisemitic. Greenstein's libel claim was dismissed, and he subsequently lost his appeal.

The CAA claimed in July 2025 that it was preparing a private prosecution against singer-songwriter Roger Waters under the Terrorism Act after he publicly declared his support for Palestine Action, which had been declared a terror organisation earlier that year.

In December 2025, attempted litigation against Reginald D. Hunter by CAA was quashed, with the presiding judge stating that the CAA had deliberately misled him and that the filing had been "abusive" with the CAA attempting to use the criminal justice system for "improper reasons".

== Opposition to events ==
A February 2017 letter to The Guardian, which was signed by 250 academics, stated that CAA cites the Working Definition of Antisemitism in asking its supporters to "record, film, photograph and get witness evidence" about Israeli Apartheid Week events, and CAA "will help you to take it up with the university, students' union or even the police." The signatories said: "These are outrageous interferences with free expression, and are direct attacks on academic freedom ... . It is with disbelief that we witness explicit political interference in university affairs in the interests of Israel under the thin disguise of concern about antisemitism."

In August 2019, CAA asked Goldsmiths, University of London, to cancel a booking made by the Communist Party of Great Britain because they objected to some of the speakers who they said "have a history of baiting Jews or outright antisemitism". The university in response referenced their commitment to free speech and that hiring event space to legal organisations was a common practice amongst universities.

== Criticism ==
In January 2015, the All-Party Parliamentary Group against Antisemitism wrote: "We were somewhat disappointed to note that not all of the messages from that group [CAA] have been in line with CST's stated approach of seeking to avoid undue panic and alarm." They added "it is important that the leadership do not conflate concerns about activity legitimately protesting Israel's actions with antisemitism, as we have seen has been the case on some occasions." That same month, the Institute for Jewish Policy Research said that a CAA survey about antisemitism was "littered with flaws", and "may even be rather irresponsible".

After criticism by CAA of Shami Chakrabarti over her 2016 report into antisemitism in the UK Labour Party, a number of British Jews wrote to The Guardian dissociating themselves from the Chief Rabbi, the Board of Deputies, and what they described as "the pro-Israel lobbyists of the Campaign Against Antisemitism".

In July 2018, the Labour MP Margaret Hodge became one of a number of honorary patrons of CAA. In the run up to the 2019 United Kingdom general election, CAA asked her to resign as a patron because she was standing as a Labour Party candidate; she did so but described their request as "both astonishing and wounding", showing a lack of respect and impugning her integrity.

In February 2020, the Morning Star reported that Shahrar Ali, the Home Affairs spokesman of the Green Party of England and Wales, had made a formal complaint to the Charity Commission that the CAA had failed to be independent of party politics, which is a legal requirement for charities, and that the commission was assessing. CAA had previously described a 2009 speech by Ali, who described Tony Blair, George W. Bush, and Ehud Olmert, as "warmongers", as antisemitic and an "offensive rant".

In 2023, following the CAA-led March Against Antisemitism, the British Jewish organisation Na'amod released a statement about their decision not to attend the CAA-led demonstration, stating: "we know this march is not just about antisemitism. It's clear from the event description that CAA has organised this march in response to huge weekly ceasefire demonstrations in London." Na'amod publicly denied CAA's characterisations of the prior ceasefire marches as antisemitic, saying "This could not be further from the truth. Pitting Jewish safety against Palestinian freedom doesn't make Jews safer; it makes fighting antisemitism harder." It was later reported that some members of Na'amod regretted boycotting the march.
