= FTP (disambiguation) =

FTP (File Transfer Protocol) is a standard communication protocol.

FTP may also refer to:

== Arts and entertainment ==
- Free-to-play (FtP), a video game business model
- "F.T.P.", a song from the album Xodus by X Clan
- FTP, a song from the album My Life 4Hunnid by YG
- Foster the People, an American indie pop band

== Organizations ==
- FTP Software, a former US company
- Francs-Tireurs et Partisans, a French WWII Resistance movement

== Projects and events ==
- Faulkes Telescope Project, educational access to two telescopes
- Federal Theatre Project, a 1930s U.S. theatre program
- ICC Future Tours Programme, an international cricket schedule

== Other uses ==
- Foiled twisted pair, a type of communications cable
- Field training program, a type of probationary training
- Fitness to practice, whether a medical professional etc. is competent to work
- Funds transfer pricing, in banking
- FTP, a streetwear brand based in Los Angeles, California, US; see FUCT (clothing)#Work and collaborations
- Functional threshold power, the amount of power produced by a cyclist at the sweet spot
- FTP-75, Federal Test Procedure to measure tailpipe emissions

== See also ==
- Fuck the Police (disambiguation)
