= We Shall Not Flag or Fail, We Shall Go on to the End =

Studio album by Geoff Berner
- Released: 2003
- Recorded: P.D. Padee Podee Production Studios, Vancouver, British Columbia, Canada, 2002
- Length: 44:12
- Label: Black Hen Music

Geoff Berner chronology
Light Enough to Travel (2000)	We Shall Not Flag or Fail, We Shall Go on to the End (2003)	Live in Oslo (2004)

We Shall Not Flag Or Fail, We Shall Go On to the End is the first full-length album by accordion singer-songwriter Geoff Berner. It was released in 2003, in Canadian and US territories.

The album is named after a Winston Churchill quote. An Exclaim! review described the album: "his slow, pleading voice combined with jarring accordion riffs [...] and artistic pauses reveal a man constantly in awe at the baffling". According to a review from Now, the album uses elements of klezmer, punk, cabaret, and folk. Following the release of the album, Berner travelled to Romania to learn more about his Jewish heritage.

== Track listing ==
All lyrics and music by Geoff Berner unless otherwise stated.

1. "Volcano God"
2. "Clown and Bard"
3. "We All Gotta Be a Prostitute Sometimes"
4. "Maginot Line"
5. "In the Year 2020" (Carmaig de Forest)
6. "Porn Queen Girlfriend"
7. "A Settling of Accounts"
8. "Beautiful in my Eyes"
9. "The Way That Girl Drinks Beer"
10. "Iron Grey"
