= Zolty Cracker =

- Origin: Vancouver, British Columbia, Canada
- Genres: Folk rock
- Years active: 1989–1997; 2020–present
- Members: Gilles Zolty; Annie Wilkinson; Wayne Adams
- Past members: Michael Louw

Zolty Cracker is a Canadian band based out of Vancouver, British Columbia, Canada. The band was named for lead vocalist and guitarist Gilles Zolty; the other members were Annie Wilkinson (bass, accordion, vocals, cello) and Ronald Wayne Adams (drums, percussion, harmonica, vocals). Their music has been described by The Province as an "eccentric punk-folk hybrid", although their mix of styles includes punk, rock, thrash, funk, world beat, acoustic folk and traditional waltz.

== History ==
Zolty Cracker formed in 1989. They began performing locally and later toured Canada, the United States, and Europe.

In 1994, the band toured in Canada, including a performance in Montreal with the band Moist. The band's 1995 album Go Please Stay was financed on their own and independently released. The tracks received some radio airplay, and the music video "Driver" was played in rotation on MuchMusic.

In 1996, Zolty Cracker performed locally, including a set at the Vancouver Folk Festival. In 1997, the band stopped performing.

Gilles Zolty started on his second solo venture, Annie Wilkinson focused on illustrations while Wayne Adams joined Geoff Berner on drums.

In 2020, after 24 years of Silence, the band got together to release a new single "Yesterday's Gone". It was a slow start to what would become a new EP, released in November 2023.

Others musicians who contributed to the band's performances were Michael Louw, Michael Venart, Jatinder Sandhu, Lara Kowalsky, Clint Rice, Jimmy Goodrich, Pierre Lumoncel, Marcel Hildebrand, and Eric Napier.

== Discography ==
- Zolty Cracker (cassette, pre-1995)
- Go Please Stay (1995)
- Flush (1997)
- Bodies Apart (EP) (2023)
