= Gilles Zolty =

- Born: Montreal, Quebec, Canada
- Origin: Vancouver, British Columbia, Canada
- Labels: Boutique Empire
- Member of: Zolty Cracker
- Website: music.cbc.ca#!/artists/Gilles-Zolty

Gilles Zolty is a Canadian musician, singer, songwriter and producer. He has released three solo albums.

== Career ==
Zolty grew up in Montreal, Quebec, and was first part of the rock band Johnny Got His Gun. Travels to Europe were influential in his developing style. The Zolty Cracker song "L'Immigrant" is semi-autobiographical, based on his experiences living in a village in southern France as well as his childhood in Quebec. A cassette of his early work was released as Zolty.

He moved out west to Vancouver, British Columbia in the late 1980s. Not long after his arrival he started singing for Freedom Press. From 1989 to 1997 Zolty along with bandmates Annie Wilkinson and Wayne Adams played in Zolty Cracker, a band formed around the presentation of his songs. Three albums were produced in that time as well as tours across Canada, down the west and east coasts of the United States and over to Europe. Not long after Zolty Cracker's last gig Gilles started on his second solo venture. Called Horny Astronaut, it was finished in 2000.

Zolty has had a number of other music related pursuits. He is one of the founders of Music Waste, an annual festival in Vancouver established in 1994, supporting and promoting independent bands. While living in Saskatoon, Saskatchewan, Zolty continued to support young artists. In 2007 he and Aleyna May Morin co-produced a compilation album of young aboriginal hip hop artists, Burden of Truth.

He has studied film scoring at Berklee College of Music and continues to work as a composer and sound designer having worked on more than 60 Theatre productions to date.

Zolty released an eponymous solo album in 2010 on the record label Boutique Empire.

Gilles moved back to his home town of Montreal June 2023.

Zolty Cracker released an EP named "Bodies Apart" in November 2023.

== Discography ==
- Zolty (1987)
- Zolty Cracker (Zolty Cracker – 1990)
- Go Please Stay (Zolty Cracker – 1993)
- Flush (Zolty Cracker – 1995)
- Horny Astronaut (Zolty – 2000)
- Gilles Zolty (Gilles Zolty - 2010)
- Bodies Apart EP (Zolty Cracker - 2023)

== See also ==
- Music of Canada
- Canadian rock
- List of Canadian musicians
