= March for the Republic and Against Antisemitism =

2023 protest against antisemitism in France

- Part of the Gaza war protests
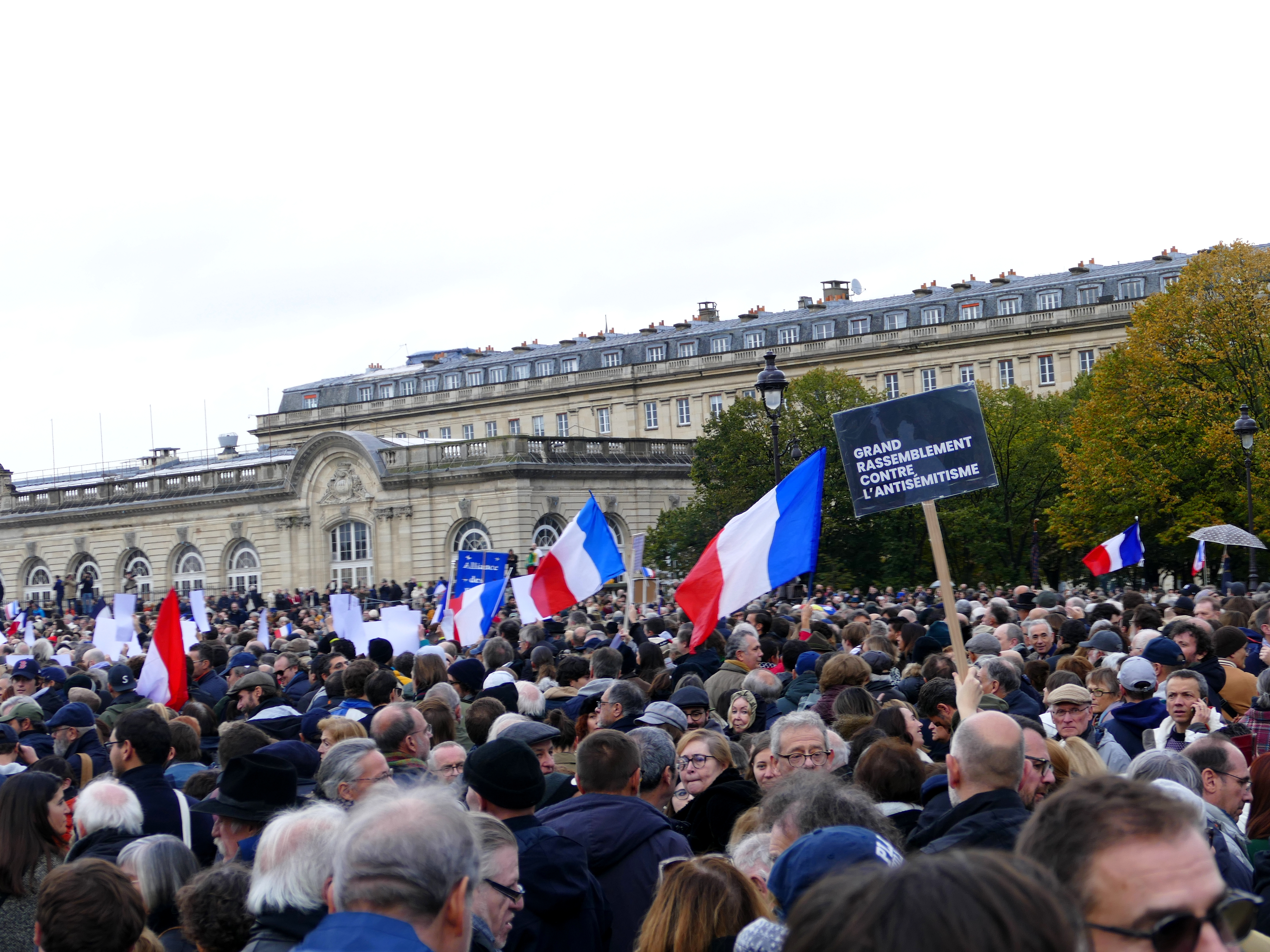
- The march at the Esplanade des Invalides in Paris
- Date: 12 November 2023
- Location: Numerous cities across France
- Goals: Condemnation of the rise of Antisemitism in France
- Methods: Silent march

Number
| 182,000 participants | |

The March for the Republic and Against Antisemitism (French: marche pour la République et contre l'antisémitisme) was a protest that took place in many cities, but predominantly Paris, in France on 12 November 2023 in response to the rise in antisemitism since the beginning of the Gaza war.

== Background ==
Since the beginning of the surprise attack against Israel by Hamas on 7 October 2023, a growing number of acts of antisemitism have occurred in France. On 7 November 2023, President of the National Assembly Yaël Braun-Pivet and President of the Senate Gérard Larcher called for the formation of a "large civil protest" against antisemitism in the Palais Bourbon and Palais Luxembourg.

== Protests ==
In Paris, a march of silence began on Les Invalides at 3:00 PM, and marchers passed the National Assembly and Senate Building two hours later. Over 105,000 participated in the event, including figures such as:

- Former presidents François Hollande and Nicolas Sarkozy (and his wife, former model and singer Carla Bruni)
- Former prime ministers Jean Castex, Édouard Philippe, Bernard Cazeneuve, Manuel Valls and Jean-Marc Ayrault
- Current Prime Minister Élisabeth Borne and 30 other members of government
- President of the Constitutional Council Laurent Fabius
- Mayor of Paris Anne Hidalgo
- Politicians Sébastien Chenu, Marine Le Pen, Jordan Bardella, Marine Tondelier, Sandrine Rousseau, Marion Maréchal, Éric Zemmour, Rachida Dati, François Baroin, Eric Ciotti, Yannick Jadot, Jean-Louis Debré, Fabien Roussel, Olivier Faure, Sylvain Maillard, and Stéphane Séjourné
- Actors Raphaël Personnaz, Richard Berry, Tomer Sisley, Élie Semoun, Jean Dujardin, Natalie Portman, and Laura Smet
- Television presenters Sophie Davant, Elsa Fayer, Arthur, Cyril Hanouna, and Thierry Ardisson

President Emmanuel Macron condemned antisemitism in a letter and stated that the march was a "sign of hope". In total, across France, over 182,000 people participated in the protests. Every political party represented in the current French legislature responded to the protests, with the exception of La France Insoumise, although various LFI politicians participated in the Strasbourg protests.

== Controversies ==
Jean-Luc Mélenchon, founder of the LFI, claimed that the march was a "far-right" protest with an agenda of unconditional support for the Israeli invasion of the Gaza Strip.

The Jewish left-wing collective, "Golem", founded on the night before the march, mobilized against it, upset with participation of the Rassemblement National (RN).

During the demonstration, members of the Jewish Defense League, who provided the RN's security service, assaulted a person who was protesting against Marine Le Pen and attacked demonstrators from the Golem collective.

Unlike other presidents at previous marches against antisemitism, Emmanuel Macron did not attend the rally.

== See also ==
- March Against Antisemitism
- 2024 Sciences Po pro-Palestinian occupation protest
