= Yiddish symbols =

Symbols of Yiddishist movements

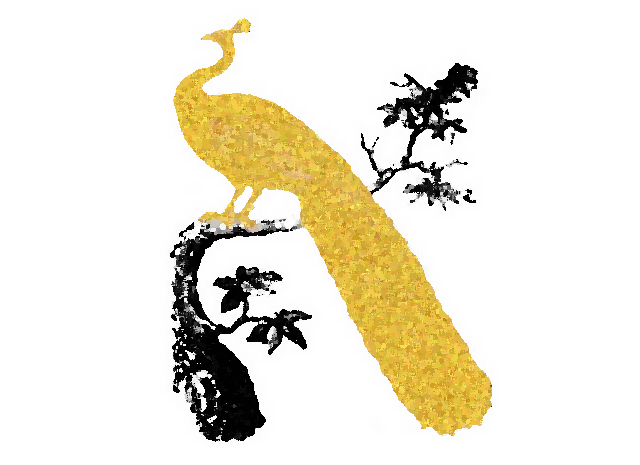
The golden peacock is a popular Yiddish symbol.

A number of Yiddish symbols have emerged to represent the language and the Yiddishist movement over history. Lacking a central authority, however, they have not had the prominence of those of the Hebrew revival and the Zionist symbols of Israel. Several of the Yiddish symbols are drawn from Yiddish songs in the klezmer tradition.

== Yiddish symbols ==
=== The Golden Peacock ===
The Golden Peacock (Yiddish: די גאָלדענע פּאַווע) has historically been a common symbol in Yiddish literature, popularized by Di Goldene Pave. It has often been a subject of Yiddish poetry, including a collection under that title from Moyshe-Leyb Halpern.

Yiddishpiel uses a logo of golden peacock plumage surrounding its theatre building, while The Forward has used gold in its masthead (also recalling Di Goldene Medine) since 2015, A variation of this symbol has been used as the logo of the Yiddish cafe Pink Peacock in Glasgow.

=== The Little Goat ===
The traditional Jewish lullaby "Raisins and Almonds" popularized the little goat (Yiddish: ציגעלע, romanized: tsigele) as a Yiddish symbol, echoing that in Chad Gadya, a traditional Passover song. The Yiddish Book Center has adopted a golden goat (a recoloring of the lullaby's white goat after the golden peacock) as its logo since 2012, designed by Alexander Isley with lettering from El Lissitzky's lithographs of Chad Gadya. Yiddishland California has adopted both a goat and a peacock.

=== Komets-Alef ===
Komets-alef is a distinctive letter in Yiddish.

In the modern era, some have turned to the komets-alef in search of a symbol for the Yiddish language, a letter that "Oyfn Pripetshik" highlights as a distinctive letter in Yiddish orthography in a play on a Yiddish ABC song. In this way, it is analogous to the cultural significance of Ñ for the Spanish language. This particular letter (אָ) is also used to represent Yiddish on Duolingo, replacing a "Yiddish flag" on the pattern of the flag of Israel but in black with a temple menorah, promoted by a user from Wikimedia Commons which was used for a time in the Duolingo Incubator.

== Flags ==
There is no historical language or ethnic flag for Yiddish speakers, though in the 21st century there have been some minor proposals for digital use as flag icons for languages.

The komets-alef flag, now used for the Duolingo Yiddish course.

Proposed Yiddish flag, that was temporarily used for the Duolingo Yiddish course.

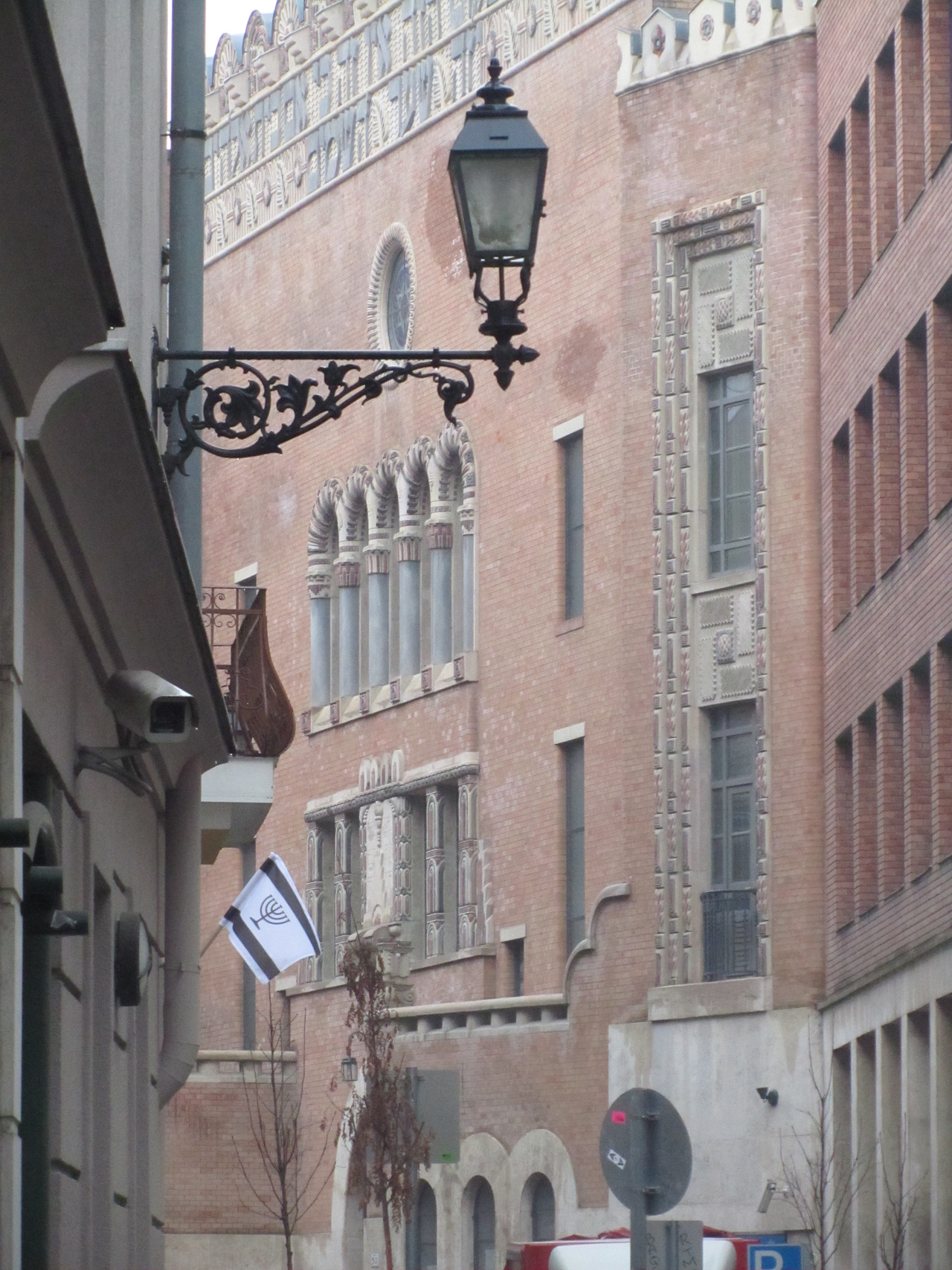
Proposed Yiddish flag flown outside a synagogue in Budapest

=== Flag with a menorah ===
It appeared on the internet around 2012, when it was published on Wikipedia, sparking an apparent citogenesis incident. Rapidly, it disseminated in the internet, becoming number one result in any google search for “Yiddish flag”. Soon after, Duolingo, a vocabulary learning app, started using it for promoting its Yiddish course. Following the publication of the article "What Flag Should Yiddish Fly?", which criticized the flag for its gloomy appearance and resemblance to the flag of Israel (which was considered inappropriate due to an unfavorable policy towards Yiddish in Israel's early years), Duolingo changed it to the komets alef. Claims that the flag originated in anarchist milieu in the early 20th century are not true.

== See also ==
- Yiddishkeit
- Yiddishist movement
