= Victory Party =

Studio album by Geoff Berner
- Released: March 8, 2011
- Genre: Folk
- Label: Mint

Geoff Berner chronology
Klezmer Mongrels (2008)	Victory Party (2011)

Victory Party is the sixth studio album by Canadian singer-songwriter Geoff Berner, released March 8, 2011 on Mint Records. The album is influenced by the Eastern European klezmer tradition, as well as elements of punk and folk.

In the summer of 2014, Geoff Berner was touring with several musicians as the Victory Party Band, playing in locales such as Vancouver, British Columbia. Other members included Wayne Adams (drums), Brigitte Dajczer (violin) and Michael Winograd (clarinet).

== Track listing ==
All tracks are written by Geoff Berner.

No.	Title	Length
1.	"The Victory Party"	3:46
2.	"Laughing Jackie the Pimp"	2:14
3.	"Wealthy Poet"	3:25
4.	"Mayn Rue Platz (My Resting Place)"	3:32
5.	"I Kind of Hate Songs with Ambiguous Lyrics"	1:55
6.	"Daloy Polizei"	3:15
7.	"Jail"	2:31
8.	"Rabbi Berner Finally Reveals His True Religious Agenda"	5:35
9.	"Oh My Golem"	5:00
10.	"Cherry Blossoms"	2:17

== Personnel ==
- Geoff Berner – primary artist
