= Carmaig de Forest =

American singer-songwriter

- Born: Carmaig de Forest; September 9, 1957 (age 68)
- Origin: Los Angeles, California, United States
- Genres: Folk, rock
- Occupation: Singer-songwriter
- Years active: 1980s-present
- Labels: Sudden Death Records, New Rose, Serious Records, Knitting Factory Works
- Website: http://www.carmaig.com

Carmaig de Forest (born September 9, 1957) is a singer-songwriter, mainly on the ukulele, but also the guitar, originating from Los Angeles, California. Since starting his career as a ukulele singer-songwriter, he has mostly stayed in the creative musical underground of California and Baltimore, at one time touring with the Violent Femmes, who would later play with him on his DeathGrooveLoveParty album. Perhaps his most recognized achievement was being the warm-up artist for the Ramones in the early 1980s.

De Forest's political songwriting style has been referred to as "Raymond Carver's poems set to music". His songs sometimes have an overtly political focus, such as his 1992 single "George Bush Lies" re-recorded to protest George W. Bush for the 2004 Presidential Election. His song "Hey Judas" compares John Hinckley Jr. to Judas Iscariot, Adolf Hitler, and Jim Jones, suggesting that he might go to Hell for his attempted assassination of Ronald Reagan failing, and making the president more popular.

Many of his songs have been covered by his friends in the Baltimore and Vancouver underground scene, including Canadian accordion player Geoff Berner, who claims to be "touring for two", as Carmaig de Forest plays mainly underground gigs, while Berner is a bit more on the road.

His fourth studio album, Idiot Strings, was released on the Serious Records label on September 9, 2007.

== Discography ==
=== Albums ===
- I Shall Be Released (1987)
- DeathGrooveLoveParty (1993)
- El Camino Real (1997)
- Idiot Strings (2007)
- I Shall Be Re-Released (2017) (an expanded edition of 1987 album, combining original album, live EP with four previously unissued tracks from the original album sessions and an additional unissued live recording)

=== Singles/EPs/Others ===
- 5 Songs (1982) cassette-only demo
- 6 Live Cuts (1988)
- George Bush Lies/Love is Strong (1992)

combining the original album, live EP and unissued materialcombining the original album, live EP and unissued material
