= Pink Peacock =

Former cafe in Glasgow

- די ראָזעווע פּאַווע

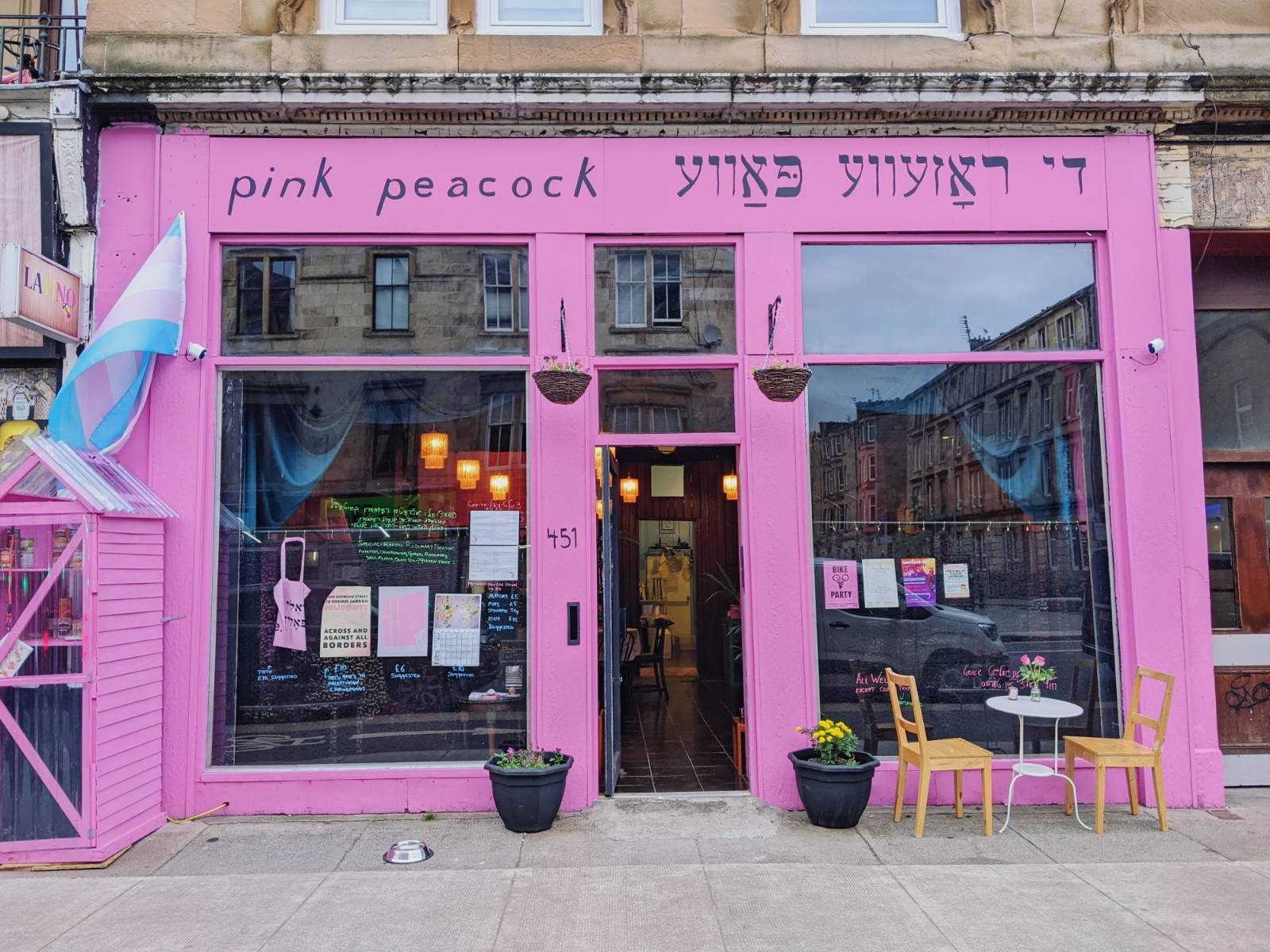

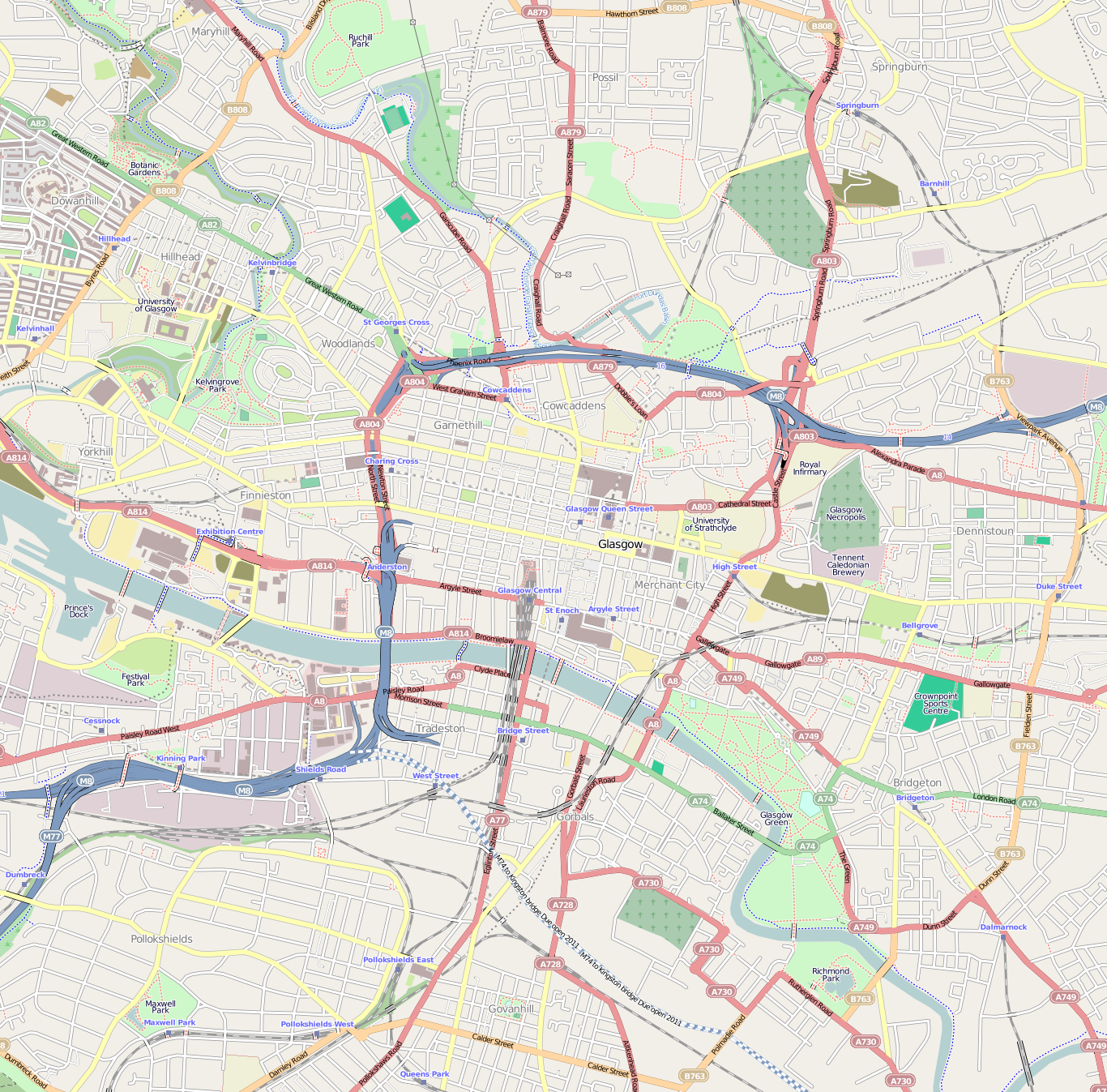
- Pink Peacock (Central Glasgow)
- Formation: 2019; 7 years ago
- Founder: Morgan Holleb; Joe Isaac
- Dissolved: 14 June 2023; 3 years ago
- Purpose: Pay-what-you-can queer Yiddish anarchist cafe
- Headquarters: Govanhill area of Glasgow, Scotland, United Kingdom
- Coordinates: 55.8357°N 4.2649°W
- Website: pinkpeacock.gay

Pink Peacock (Yiddish: די ראָזעווע פּאַווע, Di Rozeve Pave) was a café and infoshop in the Govanhill area of Glasgow, Scotland. Described by its founders as "anti-Zionist" and "the only queer Yiddish anarchist vegan pay-what-you-can café in the world", it opened physically in 2021, after being delayed by the COVID-19 pandemic, and announced its closure in June 2023.

== Establishment ==
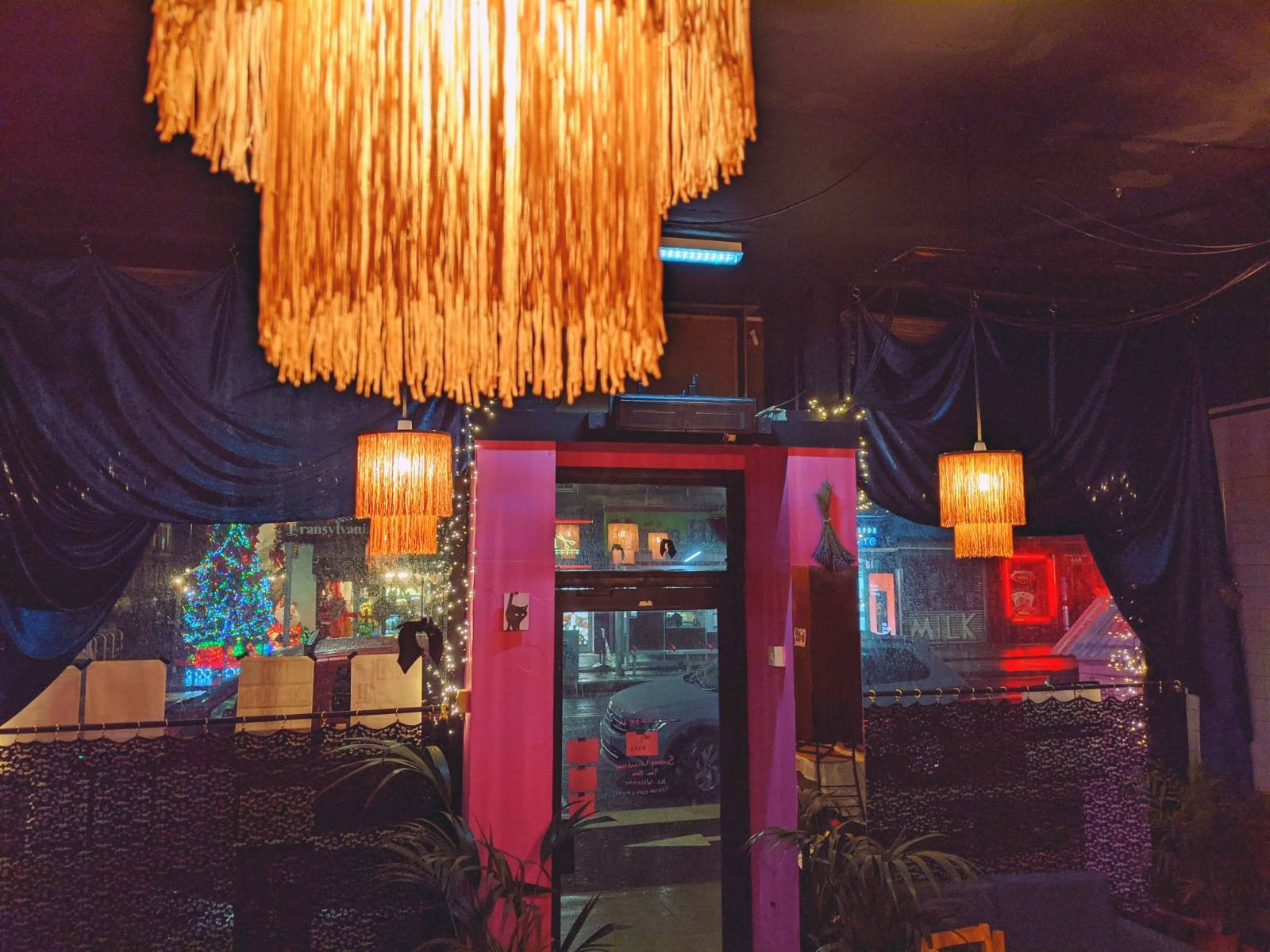
Café interior in November 2021

Pink Peacock was founded by Morgan Holleb and Joe Isaac, both active participants in Irn-Ju, a Jewish anarchist collective in Scotland. The founders formed plans to open a queer and Yiddish café in 2019. They chose the name Pink Peacock, or די ראָזעווע פּאַווע (di rozeve pave) in Yiddish, after the golden peacock that is a traditional Yiddish symbol. They were motivated by the lack of queer and Jewish spaces in Govanhill, and the lack of Yiddish spaces in Scotland; the café was the country's first physical Yiddish-focused space to open in decades.

In July 2020, Pink Peacock campaigned to crowdfund £10,000 to cover the costs of running the café for three months. They successfully raised a total of £15,885 by the end of the campaign in August 2020.

The COVID-19 pandemic disrupted the planned opening of the café. During the COVID-19 lockdowns, Isaac and Holleb distributed packages of food in Govanhill and organised various queer and Jewish online events.

== Operation ==
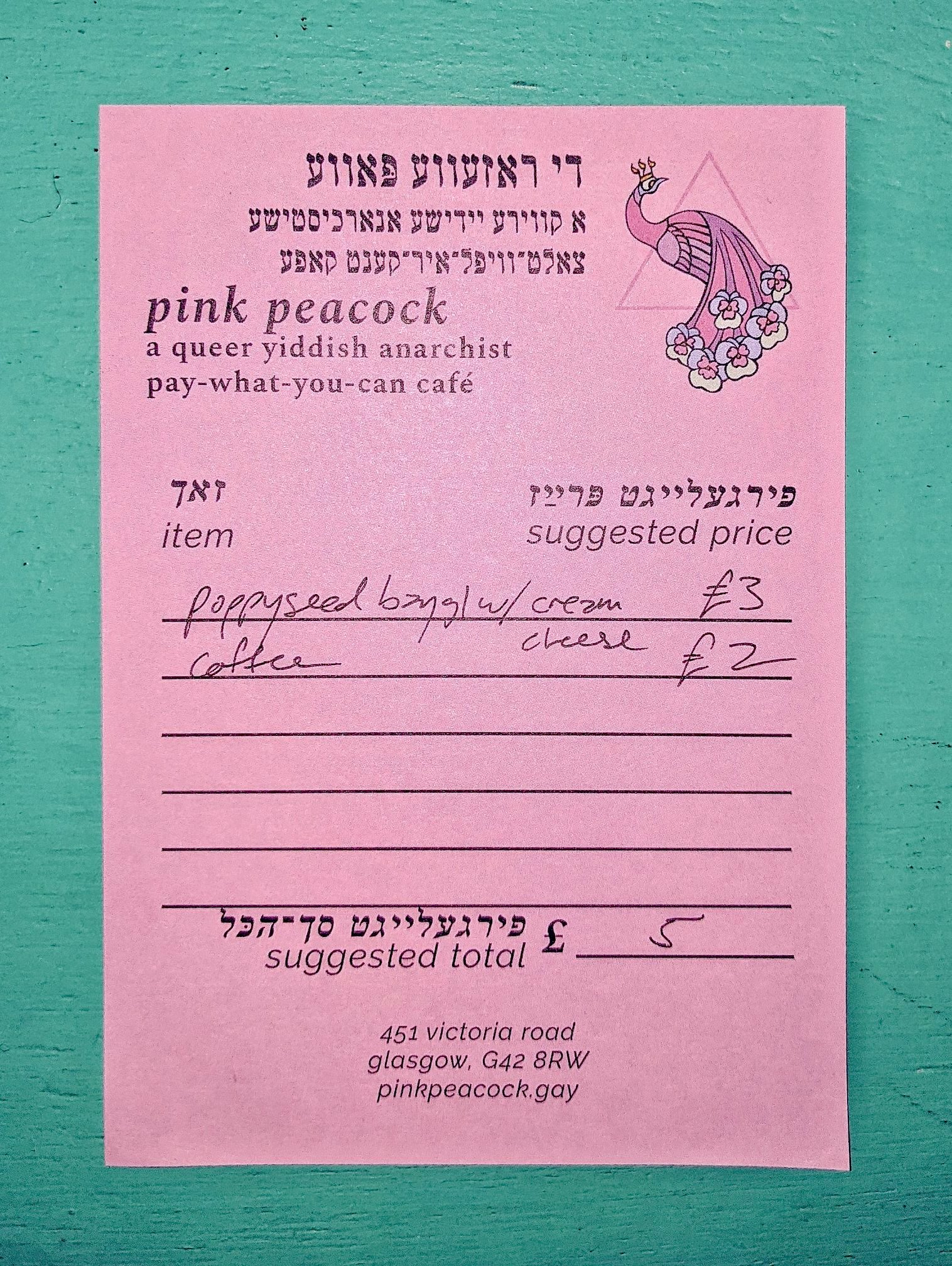
Receipt from Pink Peacock café, with suggested price

Pink Peacock operated on a pay-what-you-can model, telling customers the break-even price but allowing them to pay any amount. The café was alcohol-free and vegan, and had a community fridge outside the café stocked with food. In addition to food, they sold what Jewish Currents described in 2021 as "Jewish lefty merch". The café was run as a cooperative by workers and community members.

=== Use of Yiddish ===
Pink Peacock maintained a Yiddish version of its website, and used the language on Twitter, unlike many other Yiddish-focused organisations. In a 2020 article for the Jewish Telegraphic Agency, Holleb explained that "Yiddish is a way of connecting with a Jewish language that isn’t modern Hebrew. There isn’t Yiddish nationhood. It is a diasporic language."

=== Anti-police policy and tote bags ===
In June 2021, Pink Peacock was the subject of reporting in the tabloid The Scottish Sun, which criticised their policy of "no cops, no terfs". Subsequently, the café's storefront was vandalised when a man painted over it. The cafe had also experienced vandalism a month prior to these events, in May 2021 when a window had been smashed in an incident which also saw windows broken in adjacent branches of Farmfoods and Semichem. Additionally, the coverage led to a complaint about the café displaying in its window a pink tote bag with the words "fuck the police" in English and Yiddish, which in turn led Police Scotland to visit Holleb and Isaac's home. Holleb was subsequently charged with breach of the peace, and Glasgow police seized one of the tote bags from Pink Peacock as evidence. After the seizure, which was publicised in local media and on Pink Peacock's Twitter account, the café sold out of the bags.

=== Handcuff key sales ===
On 30 September, the café launched the sale of universal handcuff keys. They were met with criticism online as this coincided with the sentencing of a police officer convicted of the murder of Sarah Everard after falsely arresting her and restraining her in handcuffs. The café later issued a statement claiming the keys had been promoted with the upcoming 2021 United Nations Climate Change Conference protests in mind and not the Sarah Everard case and said the timing was insensitive. Using such keys while being arrested would count as resisting arrest, potentially creating more trouble for any potential buyer of such keys.

=== Book burning ===
In May 2023, for the Jewish holiday of Lag BaOmer, Pink Peacock members burned a copy of Harry Potter and the Order of the Phoenix on the pavement outside the cafe, to protest transphobia and antisemitism from author J. K. Rowling. A spokesperson denied that the act was similar to Nazi book burnings, due to differences in power between a government and a café.

=== Closing ===
Pink Peacock closed on 14 June 2023. One of the group's co-founders said that the organisation faced increased antisemitism from “right wing backlash”. One volunteer said that the café had faced rumours from other left-wing groups that the members were secretly wealthy American Jews exploiting workers. A black member of the collective suffered incidents of racist behaviour from other members. This was confirmed by the owners of the café.

== Planned re-opening ==
Co-founders Moishe Holleb and Miles Grant emigrated back to the United States, where they are citizens, and planned to re-open in Brooklyn's Crown Heights, known for its Jewish community, in mid-2025. As of February 2025, they did not have a lease.

== See also ==
- Anarchism in the United Kingdom
