= Na'amod =

British Jewish organisation

- Formation: 2018
- Purpose: End British Jewish communal support for the occupation
- Location: United Kingdom
- Methods: Non-violent direct action
- Members: 1000 (claimed)
- Website: naamod.org.uk

Na'amod is a movement of British Jews seeking to end the British Jewish community's support for the Israeli occupation of the West Bank, East Jerusalem and the Gaza Strip. They state their aim as "to work for freedom, equality and justice for all Palestinians and Israelis". Members are active in many parts of the country including London, Bristol, Manchester, Leicester, Leeds, Newcastle, and Scotland. They estimate they have almost 1000 members.

== History ==
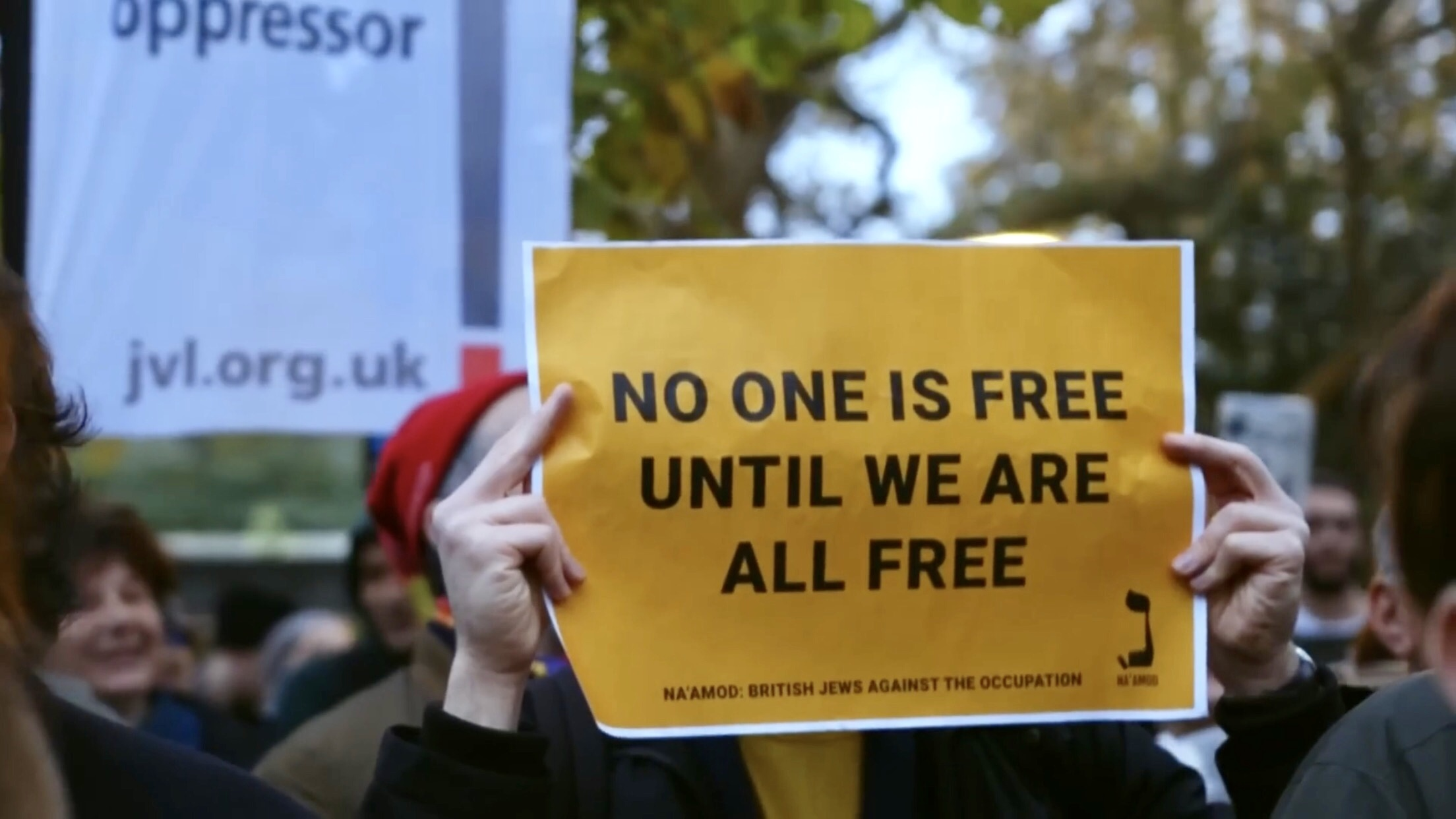
Na'amod placard in London in November 2023.

Na'amod (in Hebrew: נַעֲמֹד) means 'We Will Stand' in Hebrew, and is taken from the liturgy used to call Jews up to a Torah reading during synagogue services. Na'amod was founded in May 2018 in response to the IDF shooting of Gazans in the Gaza border protests of that year. A group of 50 Jewish activists protested the shootings by holding a mourning service in Parliament Square, including reciting the Mourner's Kaddish, a Jewish prayer for the dead. This was highly controversial within the Jewish community and the ensuing criticism led some of the activists present to establish what would become Na'amod. They drew inspiration from similar movements elsewhere, such as IfNotNow in The United States, which had also recited the Mourner's Kaddish in public to mourn Palestinians and Israelis killed in the 2014 Israel-Gaza conflict outside the offices of the Conference of Presidents of Major American Jewish Organizations. Na'amod's first action took place in Luton Airport in July 2018, where activists approached members of a UJIA Birthright trip with leaflets about alternative narratives, to counter what they argue are the one-sided briefings that British Jews receive on Birthright tours of Israel. Raphi Bloom, Co-chair of North West Friends of Israel, commented, "their attempt to besmirch UJIA is simply malicious".

In 2022, David Collier, a British Jewish blogger on antisemitism, reported that Na'amod had offered to help Pete Gregson, a left-wing activist who had been expelled from both GMB and the Labour Party for Holocaust denial, arrange a UK speaking tour. Na'amod initially made a public statement that Collier's allegations were meritless and referred to him as an "extreme right-winger" who was smearing their group due to their support for Palestinian rights. When Collier released emails that confirmed the contacts between Na'amod and Gregson, the group stated that while an initial investigation had turned up no evidence of any such interactions, they would conduct a follow-up review on the matter. Na'amod eventually confirmed the Gregson contacts, stating that the unnamed individual who made them had been dismissed from their ranks to "gardening leave", and apologized to Collier while making a small donation to a UK peace organization.

Throughout the Gaza war, Na'amod called for an unlimited ceasefire, the exchange of Israeli hostages and Palestinian prisoners, and an end to the blockade of the Gaza Strip.

== Structure and activities ==
Na'amod is a decentralised non-hierarchical organisation made up of six teams which manage different aspects of the organisation. Members make decisions by consensus, and the movement sets policy at quarterly "Big Meetings" and annual Strategy Retreats. In between these, a body called the Senior Leadership Team meets to oversee the movement and provide strategic direction. Membership is restricted to those who identify as Jewish.

Na'amod has campaigned against plans to annex the West Bank, UK Lawyers for Israel when they hosted a representative of settler group Regavim, the appointment of Tzipi Hotovely as Israeli ambassador to the United Kingdom, the Israeli bombing of Gaza in 2021 and the evictions in Sheikh Jarrah in East Jerusalem. Na'amod has called on British Jews to divest from the British Jewish communal institution, the Board of Deputies of British Jews, describing it as "an organization that chooses the project of defending the Israeli right over the project of representing Jewish communities in Britain, where the two conflict".

Since October 2023 Na'amod have been engaged with similarly positioned Jewish organisations, such as Jewdas, Jews for Justice for Palestinians, Jewish Voice for Labour, Jewish Socialists' Group as part of the Gaza war protests in the United Kingdom. Internationally, Na'amod has worked alongside IfNotNow and Jews for Racial and Economic Justice. Na'amod supported the UK's formal recognition of the Palestinian state as "a long overdue action, but a symbolic one". Na'amod submitted written evidence to the UK Foreign Affairs Committee's inquiry into the Israel-Palestine conflict, and was cited in the published report:

Na’amod, a movement of British Jews who are focused on the struggle for dignity, freedom and democracy for all Palestinians and Israelis, called for the UK to “implement a complete embargo on arms transfers to Israel”, stating that “the UK’s current partial suspension of licenses is insufficient and is in violation of its obligations under international law, including the Geneva Conventions, the Arms Trade Treaty and the Genocide Convention”.

Na'amod have also been involved in organising demonstrations outside the Foreign, Commonwealth and Development Office and a walk-out in protest of Tzipi Hotovely's appearance at the 2024 Limmud Festival. In February 2026, Na'amod disrupted a speech by Nigel Farage at the launch event of the "Reform Jewish Alliance" in London.

Na'amod welcomed the decision on 8 September 2026 by Ed Miliband, Foreign Secretary of the United Kingdom, to ban imports on goods from illegal settlements in the occupied Palestinian territories. Na'amod described the measures as a "necessary step in the right direction" to "upholding the minimal requirements of international law", calling for further steps including "full arms embargo and the suspension of the UK-Israel trade agreement". Na'amod had previously called on the UK government in December 2024 to "reject weaponising the British Jewish community", rejecting the idea that Boycott, Divestment and Sanctions campaigns against Israel are inherently antisemitic.

== Reception ==
Arielle Angel, editor of US magazine Jewish Currents, sees Na'amod as one of a number of groups in the US and UK who have "moved the intra-communal conversation around Israel/Palestine". In January 2022 they were featured in a BBC documentary about antisemitism and the Jewish community.

The Jewish Chronicle has dismissed Na'amod as "a fringe left-wing group", "a minor Jewish anti-occupation group", and a "far-left Jewish campaign group". However, Keith Kahn-Harris, a sociologist and commentator on British Jewish affairs has described Na'amod as having an "influence disproportionate to their size" with activists who are "deeply engaged in Jewish life". British journalist Rachel Shabi has situated Na'amod within the reshaping of the British Jewish community following the Gaza war, identifying how activism for Palestinians has "has enabled a reconnection to Jewish values that resonate with their progressivism, antiracism and moral compass".

Sarah Champion, a British Labour Party Member of Parliament, has described Na'amod as "a British group of Jewish people seeking to achieve freedom and justice for all Palestinians and Israelis and end the occupation of the West Bank" and lauded their "important work". On 14 September 2026, Simon Opher, a British Labour Party Member of Parliament, referenced Na'amod in a UK Parliament debate on Israel and Palestine, describing the movement as showing "extraordinary moral courage".

== See also ==
- Israel lobby in the United Kingdom – List of British groups which seek to influence UK foreign policy on behalf of the state of Israel or Zionism
- Yachad (UK) – Jewish NGO based in London promoting a two-state solution
- Jewdas – London-based radical left Jewish diaspora group which also opposes the occupation
- Jewish Socialists' Group – British Jewish social group which supports anti-Zionism
