= Di Goldene Pave =

Yiddish mythical golden peacock

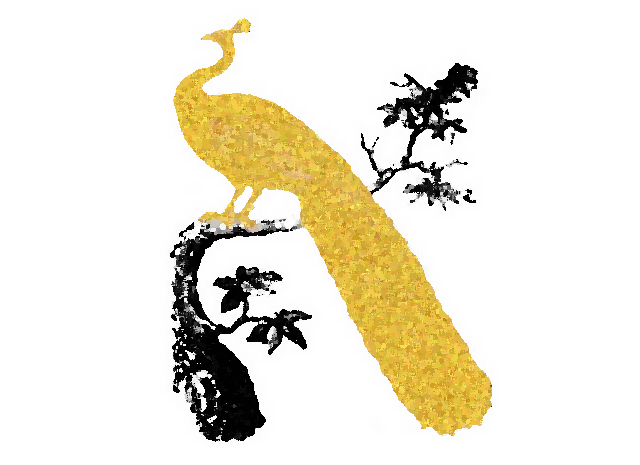
The golden peacock is a popular symbol in Yiddish culture.

Di Goldene Pave (Yiddish: די גאלדענע פאווע; The Golden Peacock) refers to a mythical golden peacock and is a common symbol in Yiddish poetry.

Yiddish poet Itzik Manger's golden peacock symbolized Jewish resilience and optimism. In one poem, Manger explains [like the stateless Jew], the golden peacock has no country but is alive wherever Yiddish is spoken.

The golden peacock is a rare bird. You can travel around the world and you will not encounter it. You’ll find it only if you make yourselves familiar with Yiddish folksong. There she is born.

Anna Margolin published "Di Golden Pave" in her book "Lider" (Poems). Musician Chava Alberstein later on used the lyrics in her Klezmer music.

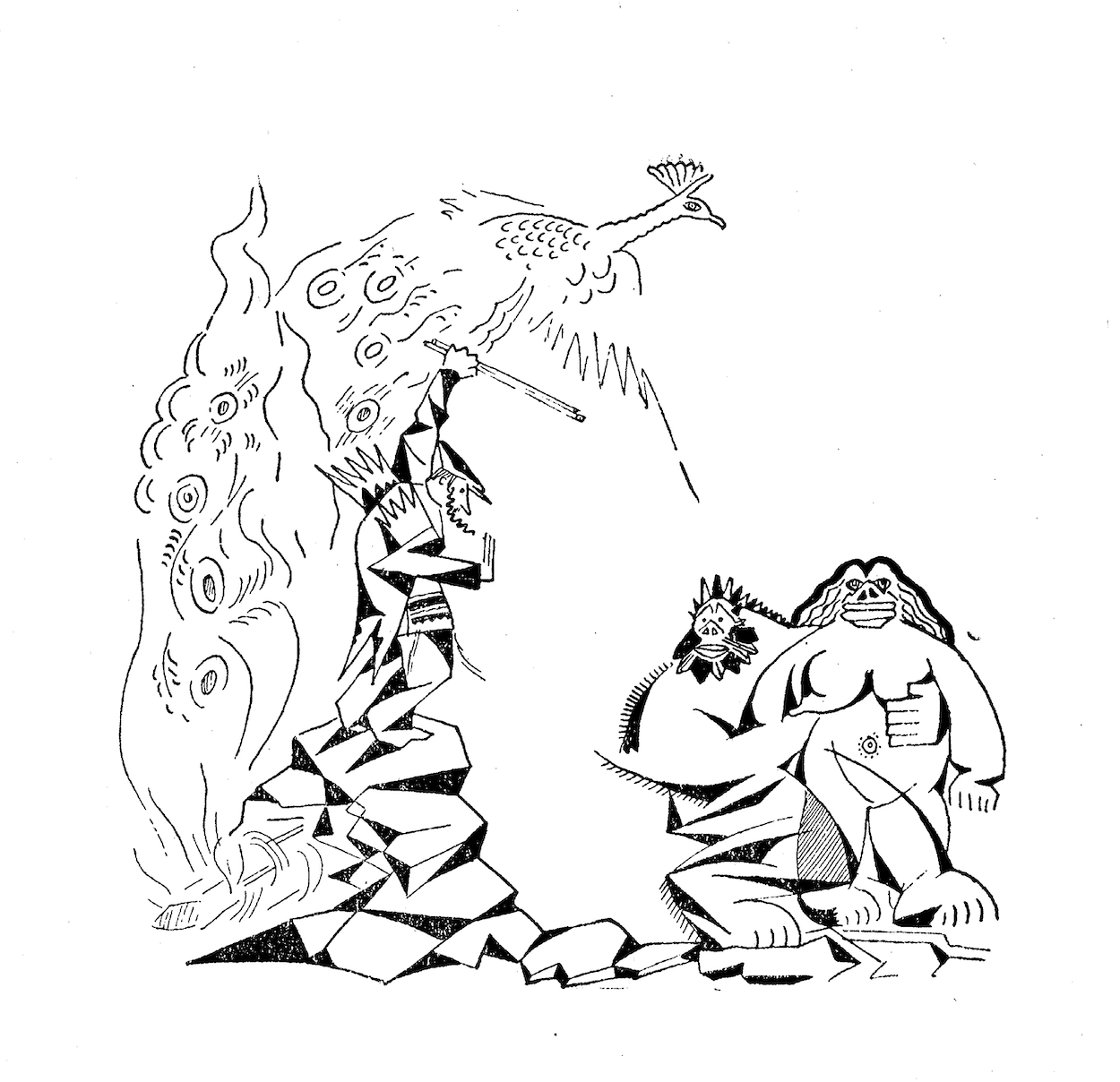
Drawing by Yosl Cutler featuring a golden peacock for Moyshe-Leyb Halpern's book "Di Goldene Pave"

The golden peacock is featured in several of Moyshe-Leyb Halpern's poems including "Di zun vet aruntergeyn" published in "Nyu York" (1919) and his satirical collection of poems titled with the same namesake.

== In literary works ==
- Halpern, Moyshe-Leib (1924). די גאלדענע פאווע [Di goldene paṿe (The Golden Peacock)] (in Yiddish). Digitized by Yiddish Book Center. Ḳliṿland: Grupe Yidish.
- Perle, Yoshue (1937). די גאלדענע פאווע [Di goldene paṿe (The Golden Peacock)] (in Yiddish). Warsaw.
