= Fuck the Police =

Fuck the Police may refer to:

- Fuck the police, a slogan of the Police abolition movement
- "Fuck tha Police", a 1989 song by American rap group N.W.A that appears on the album Straight Outta Compton
- "Fuck the Police" (J Dilla song), a 2001 song by American rapper and producer Jay Dee released as a single
