= Jewdas =

Anti-Zionist Jewish organisation

- Founded: 18 March 2006
- Purpose: Political, cultural, and artistic activities; anti-Zionism
- Location: London, England, United Kingdom
- Website: jewdas.org

Jewdas is a Jewish diaspora group based in London. It describes itself as a "radical Jewish diaspora group" and is described by media as far-left and anti-Zionist. It has a satirical-communal website and stages events in London and elsewhere.

== History ==
The group has been described by Benjamin Joffe-Walt of The Guardian as a Jewish hipster organisation engaged in political, cultural and artistic activities.

The group initially came to attention in 2006 for organising an event called "The Protocols of the Elders of Hackney" (a reference to the antisemitic hoax The Protocols of the Elders of Zion), with a flyer parodying traditional antisemitic images. Four members of the group were arrested.

In October 2011, Jewdas hosted ¡No Pasarán!, a party commemorating the 75th anniversary of the Battle of Cable Street.

In May 2015, the group brought over thirty people on its inaugural Birthwrong trip to Andalusia, Spain, parodying Birthright Israel's heritage trips for young adults from the Jewish diaspora. Advertised as "a trip for anyone who's sick of Israel's stranglehold on Jewish culture and wants to get away on a raucous holiday", the itinerary included: "See Maimonides! Get pissed! Do some Jewish tourism! Spend Shabbat with Andalusian Jews! Shvitz in a hammam! Visit a communist village! Get pissed!" Jewdas made a short film on the trip.

During the summer of 2015, Jewdas took part in two counter-protests against neo-Nazi demonstrations in North London. In January 2016, Jewdas took part in a counterprotest against a far-right rally against Syrian refugees arriving in Dover.

Jewdas' description of Israel as "a steaming pile of sewage which needs to be properly disposed of" on its Twitter feed was criticised by Jon Lansman, founder of the pro-Corbyn organisation Momentum, who said that the organisation's comments were "not helpful to Jeremy or the cause of opposing antisemitism in the Labour Party".

Representatives of the organisation use the collective pseudonym Geoffrey Cohen in speaking to the media.

== Passover Seder ==
At the beginning of April 2018, Jeremy Corbyn, the United Kingdom's Leader of the Opposition, attended a third night Passover Seder held by the group in his constituency in a personal rather than official capacity. Following controversy over alleged antisemitism in the Labour Party, the Seder was described as symbolising Corbyn's lack of touch with mainstream Jewish opinion on issues such as antisemitism and Zionism. This criticism was not uncontroversial; comedian David Baddiel said that making out "it's somehow anti-Semitic for [Corbyn] to spend Seder with [Jewdas] just because they're far left is balls", while writer and actor David Schneider said: "'Boo! Corbyn needs to get out and meets some Jews!' (Corbyn spends Passover with some Jews at Jewdas) 'Boo! Not those Jews!'"

While discussing Corbyn's attendance at the Passover Seder, Jonathan Arkush, president of the Board of Deputies of British Jews said that Jewdas is a "source of virulent anti-semitism" and claimed that its members are "not all Jews". Jewdas replied in an editorial in The Guardian that "we love Judaism and Jewish culture, as every one of our events demonstrate ... To claim that we in Jewdas are somehow not real Jews is offensive, and frankly antisemitic".

== See also ==
- Jewish pro-Palestinian activism
