= Geoff Berner =

Canadian singer-songwriter and musician

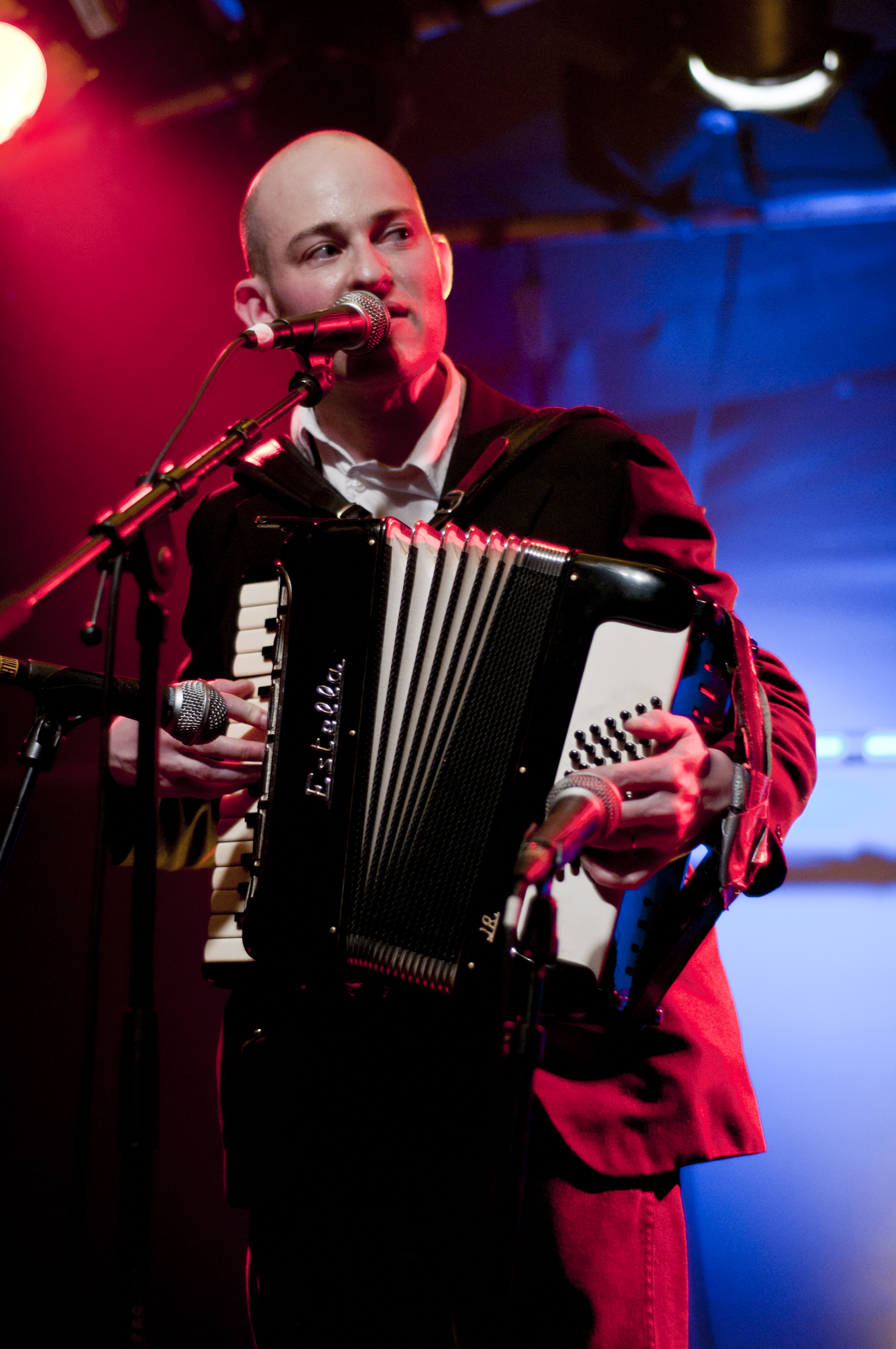
- Berner performing in 2011

Background information
- Born: 1971 (age 54–55)
- Origin: Vancouver, Canada
- Genres: Folk, klezmer
- Occupations: Singer, songwriter, musician
- Instrument: Accordion
- Years active: 2000s–present
- Labels: Black Hen, Sudden Death, HoneyMilk, Jericho Beach, Mint
- Website: geoffberner.com

Geoff Berner (born 1971) is a Canadian singer, songwriter, and musician from Vancouver.

== Musical career ==
Berner originally studied piano in his youth. At a party, somebody asked him why he did not play the accordion. As a result, he began learning to play the accordion.

Following several years fronting the punk band Terror of Tiny Town (its name borrowed from the 1938 film), Berner released his first solo EP, Light Enough to Travel (2000) on the Sudden Death Records label. Light Enough to Travel contained some of the songs he wrote while part of The Terror of Tiny Town. The Vancouver band The Be Good Tanyas covered the title track, and had some chart success with their version in England, which helped to kickstart Berner's career. In 2000, Berner was deported to Norway, where he discovered the Norwegian band Kaizers Orchestra, for whom he would later become a support act. His first full-length album, We Shall Not Flag or Fail, We Shall Go On to the End (2003) featured the track "Volcano God", which has been covered by Finnish-German singer/songwriter Mäkkelä and Canadian singer/songwriter Wax Mannequin.

In the years between We Shall Not Flag or Fail, We Shall Go On to the End and 2005, Berner travelled to Romania, to study the traditional musical style klezmer, from the many talented masters in Romania. In Romania, he suffered a severe gastrointestinal infection and was rushed to a Romanian hospital, which inspired him to write "Song Written in a Romanian Hospital". After his return, Berner released his second studio album, Whiskey Rabbi (2005) on Black Hen Music, with the help of Diona Davies of Po' Girl, on the violin, and Wayne Adams of Zolty Cracker, percussion. They would later join him occasionally on tour. Whiskey Rabbi is the first of a trilogy of klezmer-themed records.

Berner released a humorous instructional booklet called How to be an Accordion Player in 2006. In 2007, Berner released The Wedding Dance of the Widow Bride, a concept album with the theme of marriage, and second in his planned trilogy of klezmer records. He also collaborated with the Norwegian band Girl from Saskatoon on their 2007 album.

In 2008, he released "Official Theme Song for the 2010 Vancouver / Whistler Olympic Games (The Dead Children Were Worth It!)", a satirical song he promoted as the official theme song for the 2010 Winter Olympics, as an mp3 on February 19, 2008. The song asserts that, in order to help pay for the games, the government of British Columbia closed a provincial coroner's office which investigated the deaths of children.

He later attracted controversy at the Winnipeg Folk Festival in July when he opened his set with a performance of "The Dead Children Were Worth It!", followed by a joke which linked the festival's corporate sponsor, Volkswagen, to Nazi Germany.

In 2008 he released Klezmer Mongrels, the third album in his klezmer trilogy. Later in the year, Berner and colleague Bob Wiseman were given the Key to the City of Bruno, Saskatchewan.

Berner signed with Vancouver-based Mint Records in 2010 and recorded Victory Party with producer Socalled. Released March 8, 2011, Victory Party featured backing musicians who specialized in authentic klezmer music. While the majority of modern klezmer is filtered through different forms of Western music, Berner's intention was to find a more traditional sound. He stated at the time, "We're all trying to put out a vision of Jewish culture that's the opposite of the conservative, knee-jerk pro-Israel, judgmental b---s--- that's emerged in recent decades."

Following a four-year gap, Berner's next original album, We Are Going To Bremen To Be Musicians, became one of the first releases on Rae Spoon's Coax Records in 2015. The album title is a reference to the old German folk tale about elderly farm animals threatened with death, who run away from their masters in the hope of achieving freedom by becoming Town Musicians. The story's theme of irrational hope and optimism in the face of horror was echoed in most of the songs on the album. "I would describe the record as a compendium of strategies against despair," Berner stated.

Berner's next album, Canadiana Grotesquica, arrived in 2017 on Coax Records, preceded by the single "Hustle Advisory (Canada 150 Remix by Socalled)." The songs were a return to a more traditional alt-country style, guided by producer/guitarist Paul Rigby. Significant contributions were also made by Frazey Ford and Diona Davies. The album contains the song "Gino Odjick," a tribute to the Vancouver Canucks fan favourite, while other songs namecheck Terry Fox, Corb Lund and Country Dick Montana.

In February 2019, Berner released a video for the Canadiana Grotesquica track "Super Subtle Folk Song" in response to the National Energy Board's second recommendation to approve the Trans Mountain pipeline expansion.

== Personal life ==
Berner is the stepfather of actress Genevieve Buechner, and father of Margot Berner and Joseph Zeidler-Berner. He is also close friends with American ukulele player Carmaig de Forest, and covers his compositions regularly on tour, and recorded his song "In the Year 2020" on his We Shall Not Flag or Fail, We Shall Go On to the End album. In 2008, he began covering songwriter Kris Demeanor instead of de Forest, and Demeanor's song "One Shoe" appears on the Klezmer Mongrels album. Additionally, Berner often collaborates with fellow Canadian Carolyn Mark, and recorded a duet with her, for her Just Married: An Album of Duets album in 2005.

Berner is Jewish, which is reflected in his klezmer song "Lucky God Damn Jew".

== Politics ==
Between 1988 and 2001, Berner was active in the Green Party of British Columbia and was a member of former leader Stuart Parker's inner circle. He ran as a candidate at the federal and provincial levels in the general elections of 1991, 1993, 1996 and 1997.

His most high-profile campaign, however, was as a candidate for the satirical Rhinoceros Party of Canada in the 2001 provincial general election against future premier Gordon Campbell.

In recent years, Berner has expressed intense environmental concerns, and has thrown his support behind the newly launched BC Ecosocialist Party. He calls out for recognition of the importance of self-management against COVID pandemic, Long COVID and its dangerousness, the importance of wearing a mask and taking care of others. He even composed seven folk songs on this subject, released in 7 Plague Songs in 2023. He has also made claims on social media about alleged Vancouver police racist behaviours, and makes statements in favour of defunding the Vancouver police system.

== Discography ==
=== Albums ===
- 2003 - We Shall Not Flag or Fail, We Shall Go On to the End
- 2004 - Live in Oslo (credited to "Geoff Berner & Associates" (Diona Davies & Wayne Adams); live recording from May 21, 2003
- 2005 - Whiskey Rabbi (with Diona Davies & Wayne Adams)
- 2007 - Wedding Dance of the Widow Bride (with Diona Davies & Wayne Adams)
- 2008 - Klezmer Mongrels (with Wayne Adams & Diona Davies)
- 2011 - Victory Party
- 2015 - We Are Going to Bremen to Be Musicians
- 2017 - Canadiana Grøtesquica
- 2019 - Grand Hotel Cosmopolis
- 2023 - 7 Plague Songs

=== EPs, singles and others ===
- Light Enough to Travel (2000)
- "It's All Just a Matter of (Where You Draw the Line), duet with Carolyn Mark, featured on her 2005 album Just Married: An Album of Duets
- "Don't Play Cards for Money with Corby Lund", non-album track released in 2006 as a download from his website
- "The Rich Are Going to Move to the High Ground", non-album track released in June 2007 as a download from his website
- "Official Theme Song for the 2010 Vancouver / Whistler Olympic Games (The Dead Children Were Worth It!)", non-album track released in February 2008 as a download from his website
- "How to be an Accordion Player" - instructional booklet (2006)
- "Come All Ye Bold Canadians (Song of the War of 1812)", released on Henry Adam Svec's 2011 recording project Folk Songs of Canada Now

== Books ==
In 2013, Berner released his first novel, Festival Man, with Dundurn Press.

In 2017, Berner released the novel The Fiddler is a Good Woman, also with Dundurn Press. It was well-received, with Foreword Reviews writing, "The language blends the profane and poetic … Melodic and chaotic, with a wide range of voices, The Fiddler is a Good Woman creates an artist of complex character, unapologetically flawed and almost too real to be fictional."

== Television ==
Berner wrote over a dozen sketches for Sesame Park, the CBC version of Sesame Street, including animated short "Doug the Monster" and "Alison's Magic Kettle" in 1993, the first televised children's program in the world to overtly depict same-sex couples raising children. Berner also wrote several episodes during the third and fourth seasons of the animated series Ed, Edd n Eddy.
