= 2020 Labour Party deputy leadership election =

- 24 February – 2 April 2020
- Turnout: 461,006 (58.8%)
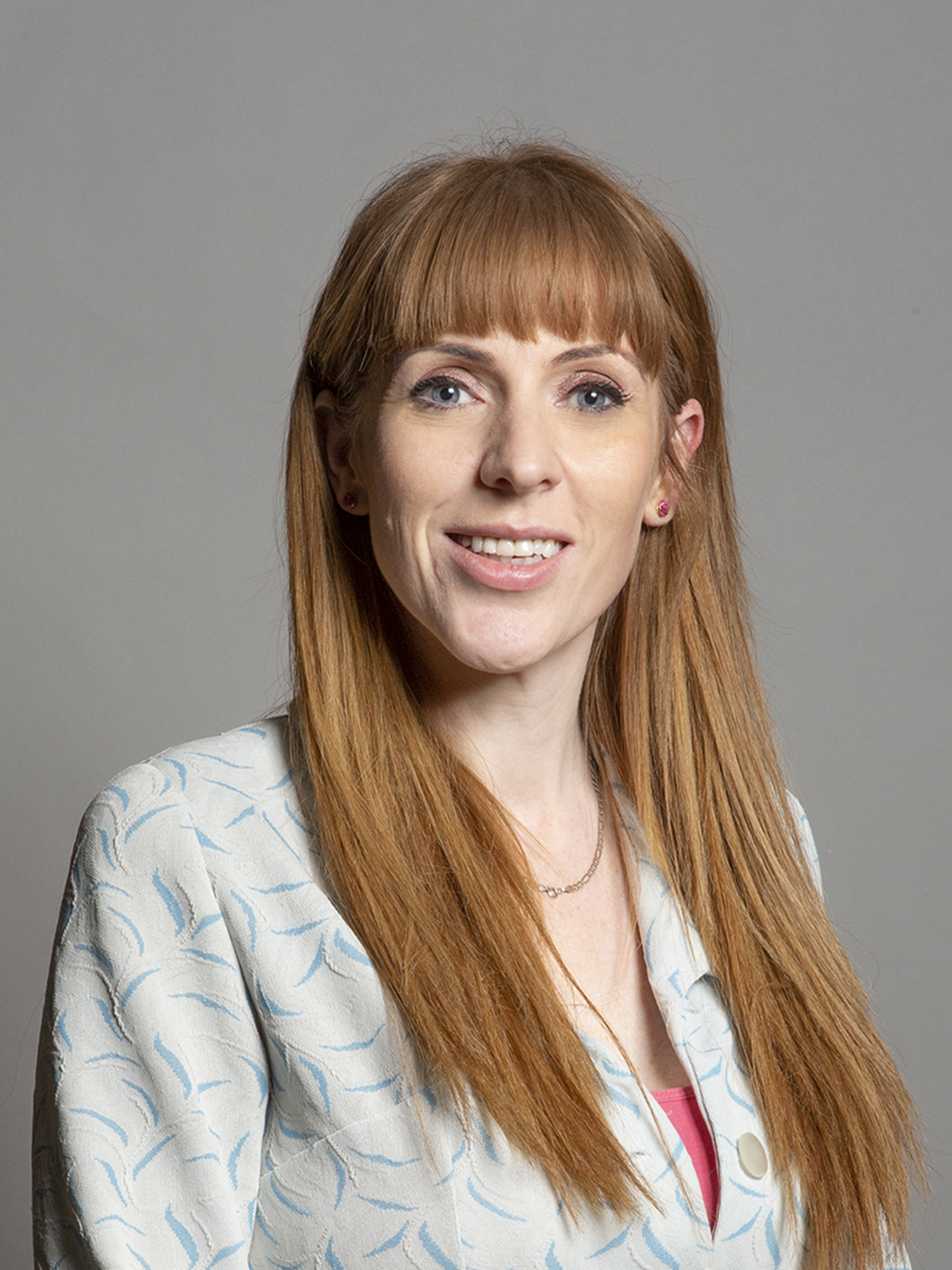

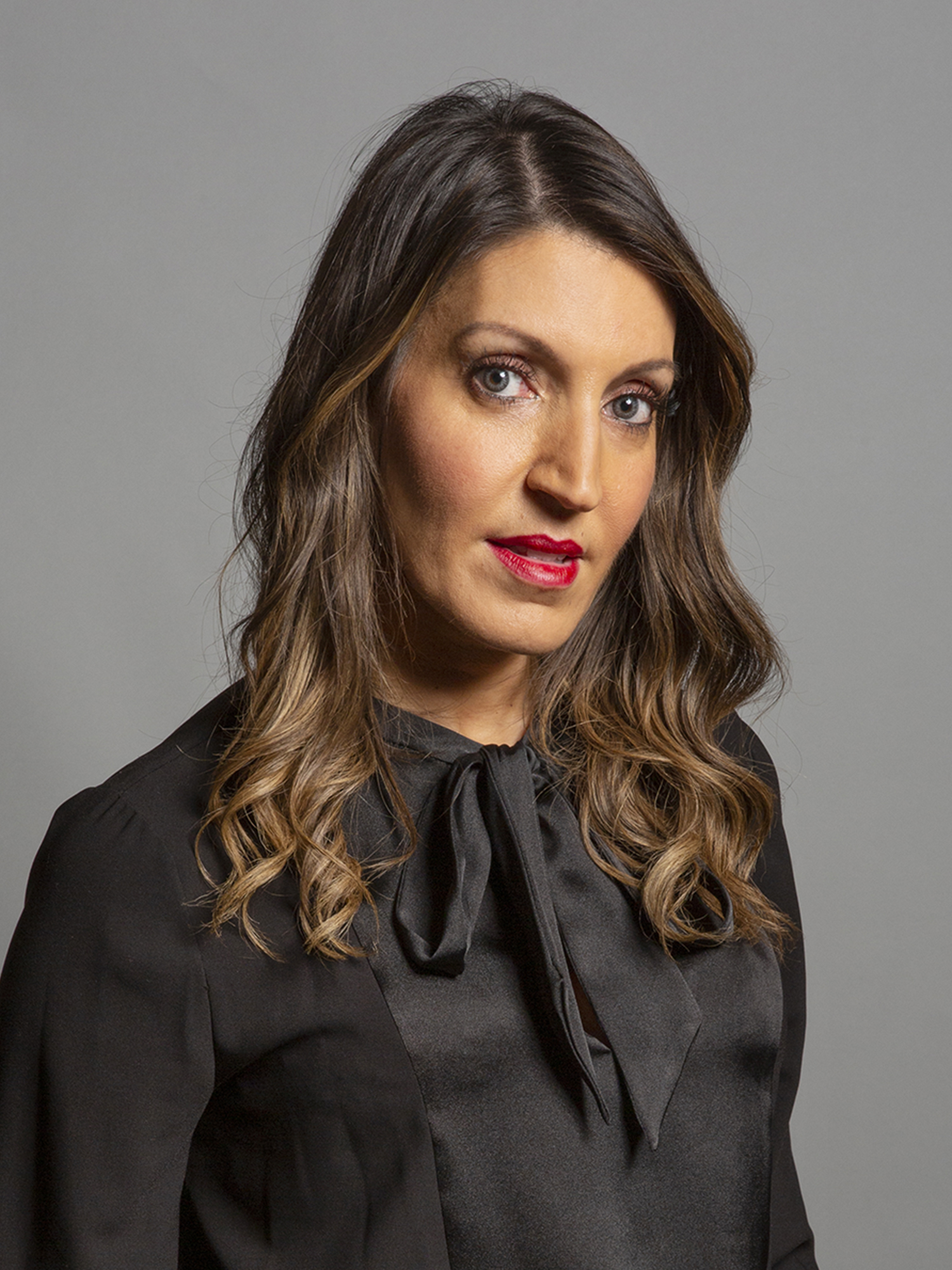

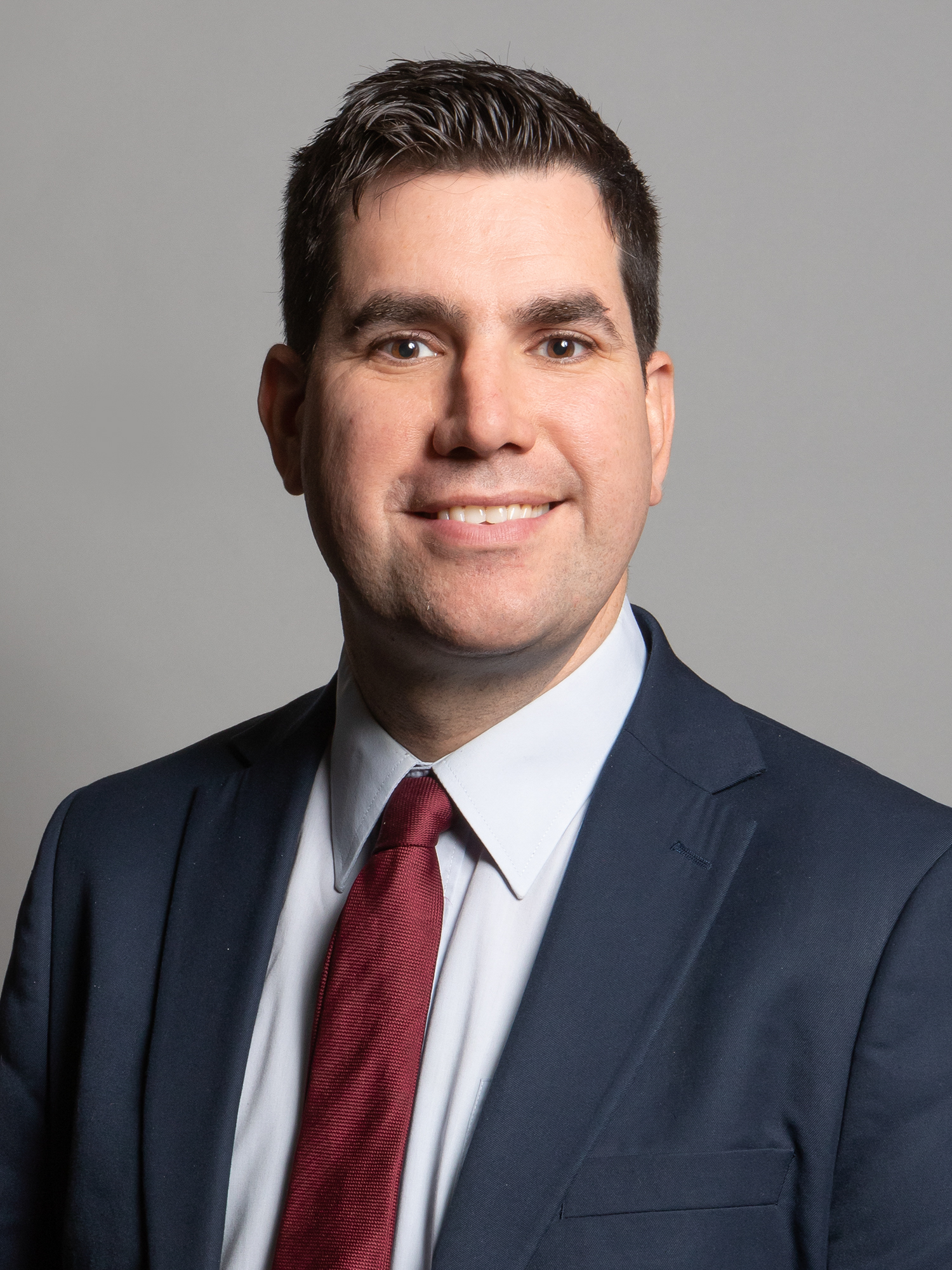

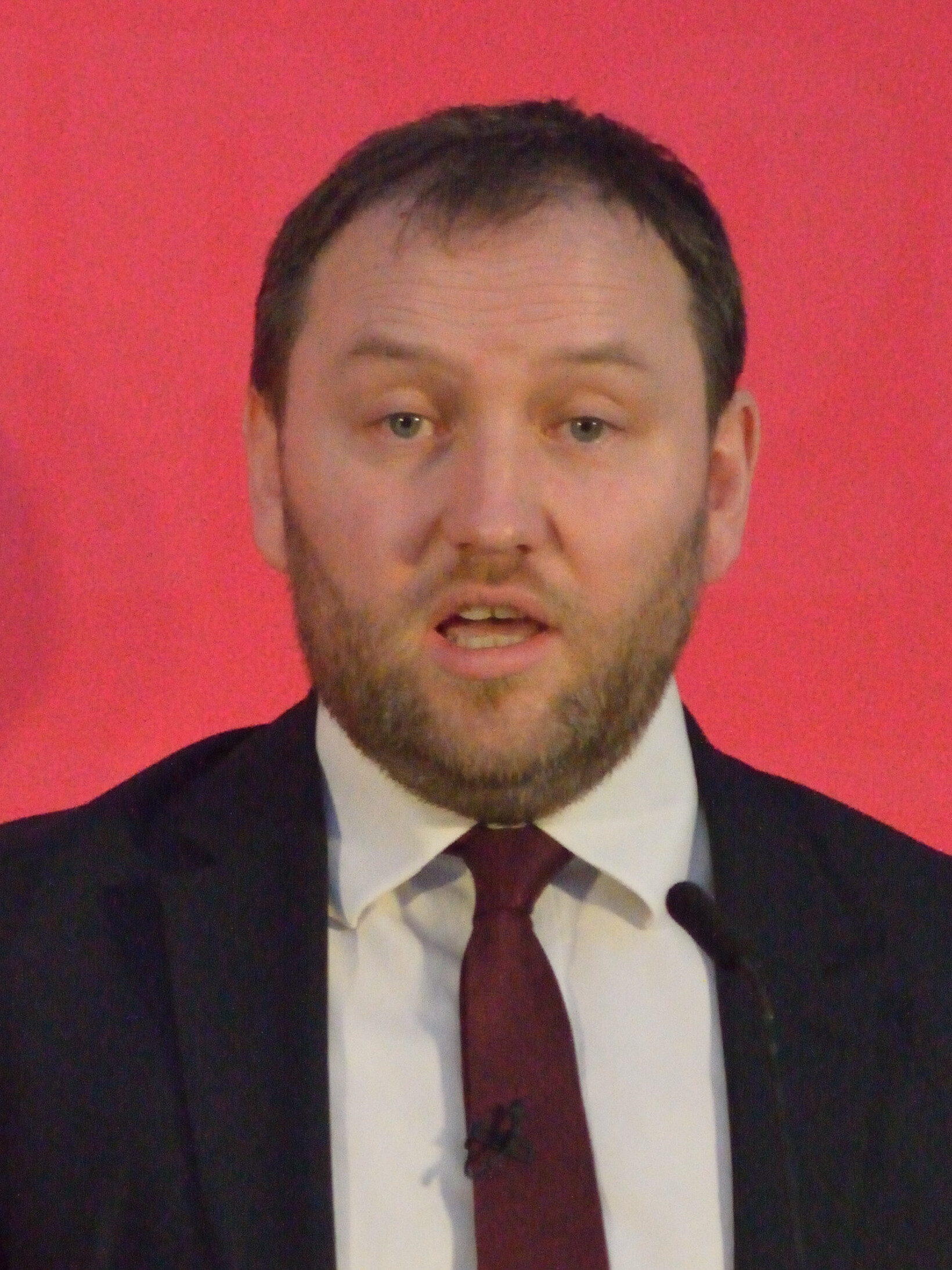

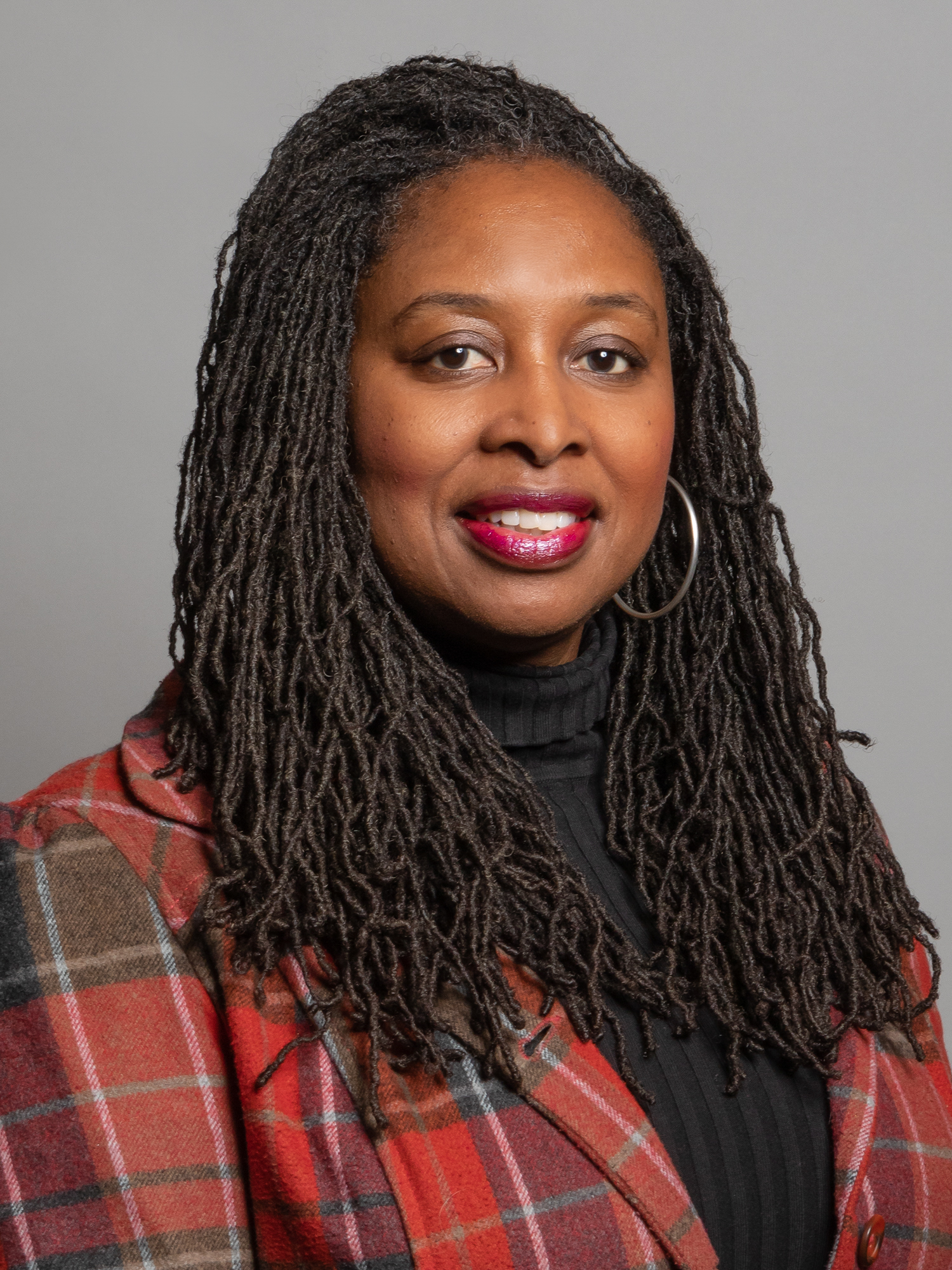
| Candidate | Angela Rayner | Rosena Allin-Khan | Richard Burgon |
| First pref. | 192,168 (41.7%) | 77,351 (16.8%) | 80,053 (17.3%) |
| Second round | 209,968 (46.5%) | 88,049 (19.5%) | 88,664 (19.7%) |
| Final round | 228,944 (52.6%) | 113,858 (26.1%) | 92,643 (21.3%) |
| Candidate | Ian Murray | Dawn Butler |
| First pref. | 61,179 (13.3%) | 50,255 (10.9%) |
| Second round | 64,560 (14.3%) | Eliminated |
| Final round | Eliminated | Eliminated |
Deputy Leader before election
Tom Watson (Note: Tom Watson stepped down as Deputy Leader on 12 December 2019.)
Elected Deputy Leader
Angela Rayner

The 2020 Labour Party deputy leadership election was triggered on 6 November 2019 by the resignation of Tom Watson as deputy leader of the Labour Party of the United Kingdom. It was won by Angela Rayner on the third ballot. It was held jointly with the 2020 Labour Party leadership election, in which Keir Starmer was elected to succeed Jeremy Corbyn as leader after Corbyn resigned following the party's defeat at the 2019 general election.

To qualify for the ballot, candidates needed nominations from 10% (22) of the party's Members of Parliament (MPs) and Members of European Parliament (MEPs), followed by support from either 5% (33) of Constituency Labour Parties (CLPs), or from at least three affiliated groups, including two trades unions and representing at least 5% of affiliated members.

Five candidates—Rosena Allin-Khan, Richard Burgon, Dawn Butler, Ian Murray and Angela Rayner—received sufficient nominations from MPs and MEPs to proceed to the second round of nominations. Rayner achieved sufficient support from affiliates to qualify for the final ballot on 20 January, at which point she also had the greatest number of nominations from CLPs. Burgon achieved sufficient support from affiliates on 29 January, while Butler and Murray achieved sufficient support from CLPs on 2 and 7 February, respectively. Allin-Khan became the final candidate to reach the threshold when she received her 33rd CLP nomination on 8 February.

The results were announced on 4 April 2020, with Rayner announced as the winner and becoming deputy leader.

== Background ==
Tom Watson resigned as deputy leader of the Labour Party and as an MP in November 2019 ahead of the 2019 general election.

== Procedure ==
The election was conducted under a pure "one member, one vote" (OMOV) system. Candidates were elected by members and registered and affiliated supporters, who all received a maximum of one vote and all votes were weighted equally. For example, members of Labour-affiliated trade unions needed to register as affiliated Labour supporters to vote.

To stand, challengers needed to be nominated by at least 10% of the combined membership of the Parliamentary Labour Party (PLP) and European Parliamentary Labour Party (EPLP), meaning twenty-two MPs or MEPs at the time. They also needed to be nominated by at least 5% of Constituency Labour Parties (CLPs), or party affiliates that consist of at least 5% of affiliate members including at least two trades unions. Affiliates consist of affiliated trades unions, socialist societies and the Co-operative Party. The vote, as in previous elections, was held under the alternative vote (instant-runoff) system.

== Campaign ==
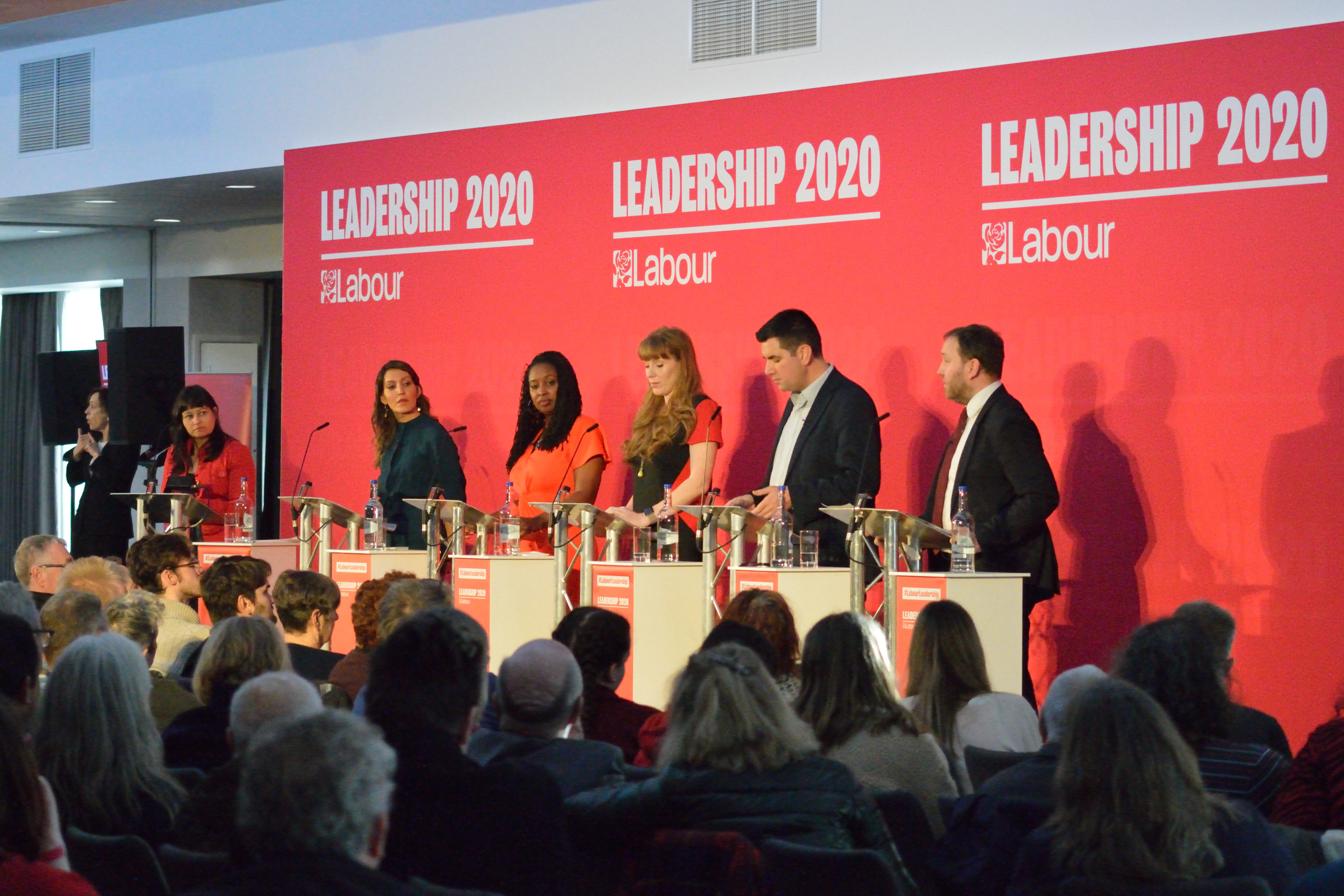
Hustings in Bristol on 1 February 2020, during the nomination stage

Dawn Butler, the shadow equalities secretary, announced on 7 November 2019 that she would stand to be deputy leader. Khalid Mahmood, the shadow Europe minister, announced his candidacy on 17 December 2019. The shadow justice secretary Richard Burgon announced that he would stand on 31 December 2019 with an article in Tribune.

Angela Rayner announced her candidacy on 6 January 2020.

On 9 January, Mahmood withdrew from the contest, saying it had become clear he was unlikely to win the support of the necessary 22 MPs or MEPs.

The five remaining deputy leadership candidates achieved the requisite 22 MP/MEP nominations by the 13 January deadline and proceeded to the next stage of the contest.

== Candidates ==
=== Nominated by parliamentarians ===
The following individuals were nominated by the necessary number of Labour parliamentarians and were subject to receiving backing from the required number of constituency parties or affiliated organisations.

| Candidate | Born | Political office | Campaign | Ref. |
|---|---|---|---|---|
| Rosena Allin-Khan | 1 January 1977 (age 49); Tooting, London, England | Shadow Sport Minister (2016–2020); MP for Tooting (2016–present) | Website | |
| Richard Burgon | 19 September 1980 (age 46); Leeds, England | Shadow Justice Secretary (2016–2020); MP for Leeds East (2015–present) | Website | |
| Dawn Butler | 3 November 1969 (age 56); Newham, London, England | Shadow Equalities Secretary (2017–2020); MP for Brent Central (2015–present); Youth Minister (2009–2010); MP for Brent South (2005–2010) | Website | |
| Ian Murray | 10 August 1976 (age 50); Edinburgh, Scotland | MP for Edinburgh South (2010–present); Shadow Scotland Secretary (2015–16) | Website | |
| Angela Rayner | 28 March 1980 (age 46); Stockport, Greater Manchester, England | Shadow Education Secretary (2016–2020); MP for Ashton-under-Lyne (2015–present) | Website | |

=== Withdrawn ===
| Candidate | Born | Political office | Withdrew | Ref. |
|---|---|---|---|---|
| Khalid Mahmood | 13 July 1961 (age 65); Azad Kashmir, Pakistan | Shadow Europe Minister (2016–2021); MP for Birmingham Perry Barr (2001–2024) | 9 January 2020 (nominated Allin-Khan) | |

=== Declined ===
- Jonathan Ashworth, Shadow Health Secretary, MP for Leicester South (endorsed Rayner)
- Yvette Cooper, chair of the Home Affairs Select Committee (endorsed Rayner)
- Barry Gardiner, Shadow International Trade Secretary (endorsed Rayner)
- Louise Haigh, Shadow Policing Minister (endorsed Rayner)
- Ian Lavery, chair of the Labour Party (endorsed Burgon)
- Conor McGinn, MP for St Helens North (endorsed Rayner)
- Jess Phillips, MP for Birmingham Yardley (ran for leader)

== Nominations ==
Candidates first needed to be nominated by at least 10% (22) of current Labour MPs and MEPs, who comprise the Parliamentary Labour Party (PLP) and the European Parliamentary Labour Party (EPLP). Candidates who passed this threshold then need nominations from at least 5% (33) Constituency Labour Parties (CLPs), or at least three affiliates including at least two trades unions that together represent at least 5% of affiliated members.

The table below shows the number of nominations achieved by each candidate. A green background indicates that the candidate has met the nomination requirements. A pink background indicates that the candidate has withdrawn from the contest.

| Candidate | First stage Labour MPs and MEPs | | | Second stage | | | | |
| Candidate | First stage Labour MPs and MEPs | | | Constituency Labour Parties | | | Affiliates | |
| Candidate | Nominations | % | | Nominations | % | | Nominations | |
|---|---|---|---|---|---|---|---|---|
| Angela Rayner | 88 / 212 | 41.5% | ✓ | 365 / 647 | 56.4% | ✓ | 12 / 32 | ✓ |
| Richard Burgon | 22 / 212 | 10.4% | ✓ | 77 / 647 | 11.9% | ✓ | 5 / 32 | ✓ |
| Dawn Butler | 29 / 212 | 13.7% | ✓ | 82 / 647 | 12.7% | ✓ | 3 / 32 (Note: Butler did not meet the threshold for Affiliates, but was nominated by a sufficient number of CLPs to qualify for the next round) | ✗ |
| Ian Murray | 34 / 212 | 16% | ✓ | 60 / 647 | 9.3% | ✓ | 3 / 32 (Note: Murray did not meet the threshold for Affiliates, but was nominated by a sufficient number of CLPs to qualify for the next round) | ✗ |
| Rosena Allin-Khan | 23 / 212 | 10.8% | ✓ | 56 / 647 | 8.7% | ✓ | 3 / 32 (Note: Allin-Khan did not meet the threshold for Affiliates, but was nominated by a sufficient number of CLPs to qualify for the next round) | ✗ |
| Khalid Mahmood (withdrawn) | 3 / 212 (Note: After his withdrawal, Mahmood's backers both nominated another candidate) | 1.4% | ✗ | | | | | |
| Nominated | 196 / 212 | 92.5% (Note: Excludes Mahmood's nominators) | | 640 / 647 | 98.9% | | 26 / 32 | |

== Endorsements ==
Candidates and potential candidates also received the support of notable people who are not current Labour Party MPs.

=== Rosena Allin-Khan ===
- Chris Addison, actor and comedian
- Liz McInnes, former MP for Heywood and Middleton
- Melanie Onn, former MP for Great Grimsby

=== Richard Burgon ===
- Laura Pidcock, former MP for North West Durham
- Mark Serwotka, leader of the Public and Commercial Services Union (PCS) trade union
- Dennis Skinner, former MP for Bolsover

=== Ian Murray ===
- Tony Blair, former Labour Party leader, and Prime Minister
- Gordon Brown, former Labour Party leader, and Prime Minister
- Alistair Darling, Labour peer, former Chancellor of the Exchequer and former MP for Edinburgh South West
- David Hanson, former MP for Delyn
- Roy Hattersley, Labour peer and former Deputy leader of the Labour Party
- Blair McDougall, political activist
- Ruth Smeeth, former MP for Stoke-on-Trent North
- Elizabeth Smith, Labour peer and wife of John Smith
- Anna Turley, former MP for Redcar
- Phil Wilson, former MP for Sedgefield

=== Angela Rayner ===
- Paul Sweeney, former MP for Glasgow North East
- Momentum
- Open Labour

== Opinion polls ==
| Date(s) conducted | Pollster/client | Sample size | First preference | | | | | | |
| Date(s) conducted | Pollster/client | Sample size | Allin-Khan | Burgon | Butler | Murray | Rayner | Others | Lead |
|---|---|---|---|---|---|---|---|---|---|
| Result | | | 16.8% | 17.3% | 10.9% | 13.3% | 41.7% | —N/a | 24.4% |
| 21–24 February 2020 | Survation/LabourList | 1,005 Labour members, affiliates and registered supporters | 17% | 23% | 10% | 14% | 35% | —N/a | 12% |
| 20–25 January 2020 | YouGov/The Times | 1,005 Labour members | 13% | 19% | 12% | 9% | 47% | —N/a | 28% |
| 13–15 January 2020 | YouGov/Sky News | 1,005 Labour members | 8% | 15% | 12% | 8% | 57% | —N/a | 42% |
| 8–13 January 2020 | Survation/LabourList | 3,800 LabourList readers | 5% | 19% | 8% | 9% | 60% | <1% | 41% |

== Results ==
The result of the election as well as the corresponding contest for leader of the Labour Party was announced at 10:45 (BST) on 4 April 2020. The announcement was originally due to take place at a special conference in London, but because of the ongoing COVID-19 pandemic it was cancelled in favour of a "scaled-back event". Because of this, members would only find out the results by means of an email and coverage in the mainstream media.

Angela Rayner was elected. Rosena Allin-Khan came second, which was different from the results predicted by opinion polls.

| Candidate | First round | | Second round | | Third round | |
| Candidate | Votes | % | Votes | % | Votes | % |
|---|---|---|---|---|---|---|
| Angela Rayner | 192,168 | 41.7 | 209,698 | 46.5 | 228,944 | 52.6 |
| Rosena Allin-Khan | 77,351 | 16.8 | 88,049 | 19.5 | 113,858 | 26.1 |
| Richard Burgon | 80,053 | 17.3 | 88,664 | 19.7 | 92,643 | 21.3 |
| Ian Murray | 61,179 | 13.3 | 64,560 | 14.3 | Eliminated | |
| Dawn Butler | 50,255 | 10.9 | Eliminated | | | |

== Timeline ==
=== Overview ===
Candidate status
| Active candidate |
| Candidate withdrew |
Events
| Watson announces resignation |
| Nominations from the PLP and EPLP close |
| Nominations from CLPs and affiliates open |
| Nominations from CLPs and affiliates close |
| Membership ballot opens |
| Membership ballot closes |
| Result announced |

=== 2019 ===
==== November ====
- 6 November: Tom Watson resigns as deputy leader of the Labour Party and as MP for West Bromwich East
- 7 November: Dawn Butler announces her candidacy

==== December ====
- 12 December: Labour loses sixty seats in the 2019 United Kingdom general election
- 13 December: Jeremy Corbyn announces his resignation as leader of the Labour Party effective the outcome of the 2020 leadership election
- 17 December: Khalid Mahmood announces his candidacy
- 31 December: Richard Burgon announces his candidacy

=== 2020 ===
==== January ====
- 6 January: Angela Rayner announces her candidacy
- 7 January: Rosena Allin-Khan and Ian Murray announce their candidacies
- 9 January: Mahmood withdraws
- 13 January: MP/MEP nominations close, party announces that Allin-Khan, Burgon, Butler, Murray and Rayner all proceed to the next round
- 15 January: Nominations from CLPs and affiliates open

==== February ====
- 14 February: Nominations from CLPs and affiliates close
- 24 February: Labour members receive postal ballots and online voting forms

==== April ====
- 2 April: 12:00 – Voting closes
- 4 April: Result of the votes announced at 10:45 and new Labour deputy leader announced

== See also ==
- 2020 Labour Party leadership election
- 2020 Scottish Labour deputy leadership election
- Nominations in the 2020 Labour Party deputy leadership election
- Nominations in the 2020 Labour Party leadership election
