= Paul Daisley =

British politician (1957–2003)

Member of Parliament for Brent East
- In office 7 June 2001 – 18 June 2003
- Preceded by: Ken Livingstone
- Succeeded by: Sarah Teather

Leader of the Brent London Borough Council
- In office April 1996 – 2001

Member of the Brent London Borough Council
- In office 3 May 1990 – 2001

Personal details
- Born: 20 July 1957 London, England
- Died: 18 June 2003 (aged 45) London, England
- Party: Labour
- Spouse: Lesley Jordan (m. 1984)

Paul Andrew Daisley (20 July 1957 – 18 June 2003) was a British politician from the Labour Party who is most notable for his period as Leader of Brent Borough Council. After working as an accounting officer and for his own management consultancy, he succeeded in significantly improving the reputation of the council and pioneering anti-crime initiatives. His success led to his election as Member of Parliament (MP) for Brent East, but he was seriously ill with cancer by the time the opportunity came. Despite apparently successful treatment, he was unable to play a significant role in Parliament before a new and terminal cancer was discovered.

== Early life ==
Born in Acton, west London, Daisley was the only son of Peter and Joan Daisley. He spent many days at his grandparents' home in Hallaton in Leicestershire. He went to Littlemore School in Littlemore, south Oxford then Abingdon College in Abingdon, where he met his future wife. He worked as an Accounting Officer for Texaco from 1976 to 1984. In 1984 he set up his own management consultancy and quality assurance company, Daisley Associates, together with his father; he was formally Director of Finance and Administration for the company.

While at Texaco in 1979, Daisley had joined the Association of Scientific, Technical and Managerial Staffs and became an active trade unionist; he joined the Labour Party in 1982 in Lewisham, feeling that "it needed all the help it could get". Daisley was to become a leading local supporter of Neil Kinnock. He married Lesley Jordan in 1984, and the two moved to Sudbury Avenue in the London Borough of Brent.

== Local government ==
At the 1986 local elections, Daisley was an unsuccessful candidate in the then safe Conservative ward of Sudbury Court. Highly critical of the Labour administration that won the election, Daisley worked together with likeminded colleagues to rebuild the party. Although Labour lost control in the 1990 local elections, Daisley was elected as a councillor for Harlesden ward. and became Chief Whip of the Labour group after a year. His ward had a serious problem with gang violence among the black population, and Daisley's decision to confront the gangs won him local respect.

Daisley was Labour group leader from 1993 and led the party through the 1994 council elections. The Conservative administration in Brent had reduced the level of Council Tax charged, and Daisley admitted that his party might have trouble fighting the election because of it; he stressed that the council had also increased charges and rents. Although the Conservatives did not win an overall majority, their administration continued. Daisley became Leader of the Council in April 1996, when the death of a Conservative councillor placed the Conservatives in a minority; he negotiated a deal with the Liberal Democrat group which allowed Labour to gain control with the casting vote of the Mayor. After taking control Daisley reorganised the council's internal organisation so that departments were no longer failing. Labour won an overall majority in the 1998 elections.

As Leader, Daisley took on the role of tackling the crime problems of his borough, declaring that "thanks to the evil activities of a handful of people Harlesden has a reputation as a bad and fearful place" and the time had come "to take a stand against the gangsters who are a menace on our streets". He put up a series of controversial posters with the slogan "Young, gifted and dead", and set up street crime patrols modelled on those in New York which were briefed by Metropolitan Police officers and based at local police stations. He received praise for tackling crime from the Commissioner, Sir John Stevens. Daisley was initially sceptical about the redevelopment of Wembley Stadium, although the election of Ken Livingstone as Mayor of London led to a change of mind in May 2000. When the council granted planning permission for the redevelopment, it insisted on a legal agreement requiring substantial payments for improvements; Daisley became unpopular with the Football Association for taking this stance.

Long before legislation required it, Daisley made the council set up a Standards Committee and bring in a code of practice for councillors; he set up a special website for audits and investigations and encouraged residents to report suspected fraud. By the end of his term Daisley was sometimes referred to as 'the man who had put the "r" back into Brent', a statement referring to the frequent nickname 'Bent' used by Private Eye due to the council's association with corruption.

== Selection for Parliament ==
Despite being described a 'Blairite', Daisley supported the Mayoral campaign of Brent East MP Ken Livingstone when he fought as an independent after being defeated for the official Labour Party nomination. After Livingstone won, Daisley pressed for his readmission into the Labour Party, on the grounds that Livingstone had "gone out of his way to be conciliatory". Livingstone's election as Mayor meant giving up his Parliamentary seat, and Daisley was viewed as one of two front-runners for the nomination (his rival being Mary Turner, a leading official of the GMB union). Daisley received Livingstone's support in the fierce battle; a dispute about postal votes in the selection had to be taken to the regional party body to be resolved. Daisley's selection, as a white candidate for a very ethnically mixed constituency, was denounced by the vice-chairman of the Black Socialist Society.

== Parliament and illness ==
In February 2001 Daisley felt suddenly unwell and was rushed to hospital where an emergency operation removed a tumour in his colon; he spent six weeks in a coma recovering from the operation. As a result, he was unable to campaign for his own election at the 2001 general election. Despite his absence, Daisley was elected with a majority of 13,047, retaining the same percentage majority which Ken Livingstone, who had personally campaigned for him, had previously obtained. He did not attend Parliament to take the oath of allegiance until 14 September, during an emergency debate on the recent September 11 attacks, the last member to take the oath in 2001, and made his maiden speech on 1 February 2002 (the last of the 2001 intake to do so). This would be his only spoken contribution to the House of Commons. Having regained his mobility after some months using a wheelchair, Daisley paid tribute to the National Health Service staff who had helped him, before speaking about the role of local authorities in helping disadvantaged areas.

Daisley's weight had fallen to seven and a half stone at the time of his treatment, and it was slowly recovering through 2002. However, in November a new cancer was discovered, and despite further surgery Daisley was told by his doctors that it was terminal. His colleague Barry Gardiner, MP for Brent North, announced the prognosis to the House of Commons on the last sitting day before Christmas. He died from colorectal cancer in London on 18 June 2003, aged 45.

It would be 12 years until Labour held the seat again, because in the September 2003 by-election, following Daisley's death, the seat was gained by 29-year old Sarah Teather of the Liberal Democrats. The anti-Iraq War vote played a key part in gaining the seat. At the time Teather became the youngest MP in the Commons and held the seat and its successor seat of Brent Central until 2015, when she stood down and Labour took the seat back again.

== Memorials ==
In memory of Daisley, the Paul Daisley Trust was established in 2003 to raise awareness of colon cancer and to encourage early diagnosis. It also aims to help people suffering from colon cancer and who are undergoing treatment. It holds a regular fundraising celebrity cricket match. The main hall in Brent Town Hall was named the 'Paul Daisley Hall' in his honour.

Parliament of the United Kingdom
Preceded by Ken Livingstone	Member of Parliament for Brent East; 2001–2003	Succeeded by Sarah Teather
