= Richard Burgon =

British politician (born 1980)

Richard Burgon MP
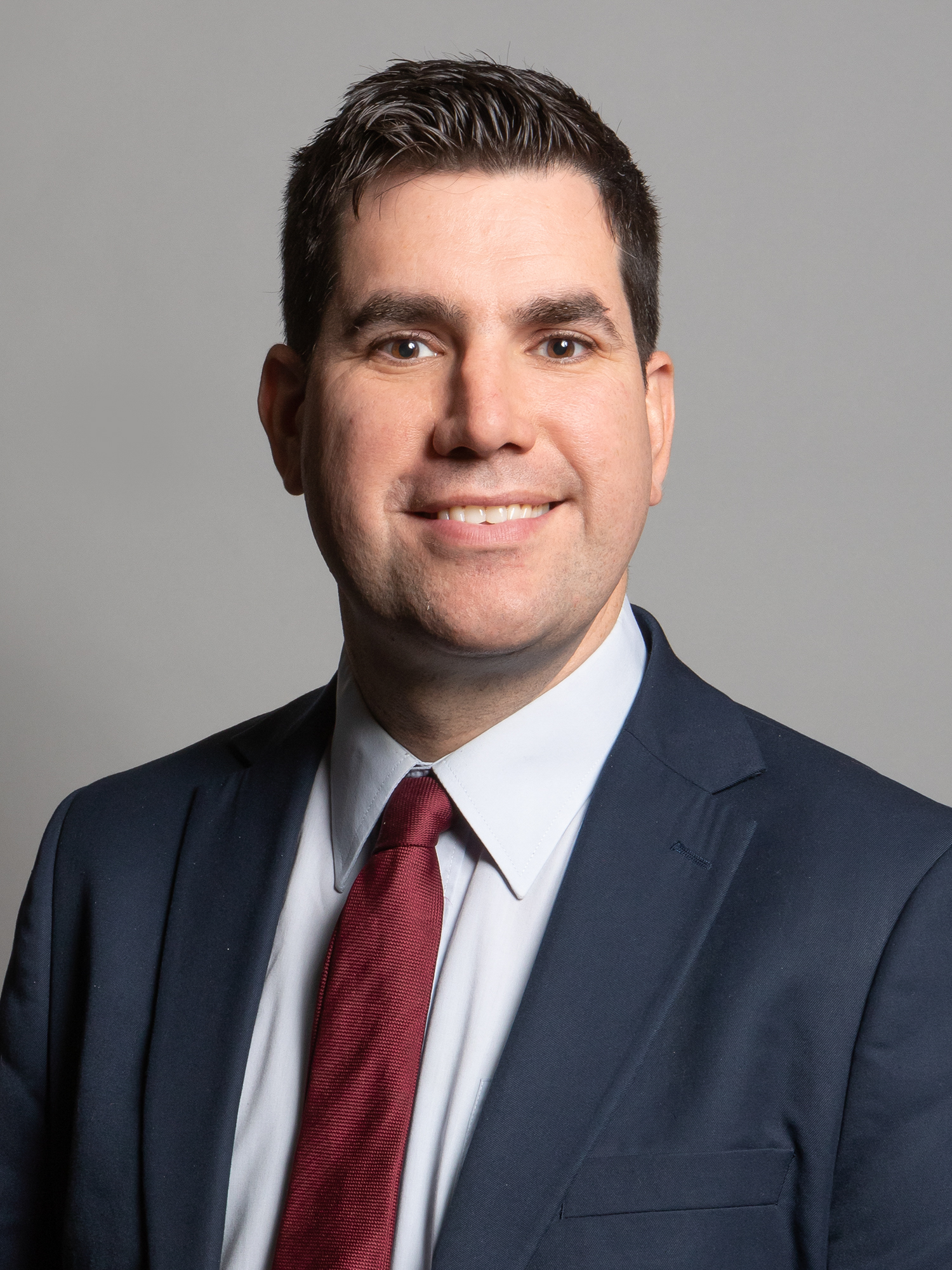
- Official portrait, 2020

Shadow Secretary of State for Justice Shadow Lord Chancellor
- In office 27 June 2016 – 6 April 2020
- Leader: Jeremy Corbyn
- Preceded by: The Lord Falconer of Thoroton
- Succeeded by: David Lammy

Shadow Economic Secretary to the Treasury
- In office 16 September 2015 – 27 June 2016
- Leader: Jeremy Corbyn
- Preceded by: Cathy Jamieson
- Succeeded by: Jonathan Reynolds

Member of Parliament for Leeds East
- Incumbent
- Assumed office 7 May 2015
- Preceded by: George Mudie
- Majority: 11,265 (38.6%)

Personal details
- Born: Richard Burgon; 19 September 1980 (age 46) Leeds, West Yorkshire, England
- Party: Labour
- Other political affiliations: Independent (2024–2025); Socialist Campaign Group
- Education: St John's College, Cambridge (BA)
- Website: Official website

Richard Burgon (born 19 September 1980) is a British politician who has been the Member of Parliament (MP) for Leeds East since 2015. A member of the Labour Party, Burgon served as Shadow Secretary of State for Justice and Shadow Lord Chancellor in the Corbyn shadow cabinet from 2016 to 2020.

Burgon read English Literature at St John's College, Cambridge, where he was chairman of the Cambridge University Labour Club. After working as an employment lawyer, he was elected as the MP for Leeds East at the 2015 general election.

Burgon was appointed as Shadow Economic Secretary to the Treasury (City Minister) in September 2015 by new Labour leader Jeremy Corbyn. Burgon was promoted to Shadow Secretary of State for Justice in June 2016 following the organised mass resignations in protest against the leadership of Corbyn. He was a candidate in the 2020 Labour Party deputy leadership election. He was dismissed from the Shadow cabinet in April 2020 after Keir Starmer became Labour Leader.

As of March 2021, he was Vice President of Labour CND, a group open to all Labour Party members who are also members of the Campaign for Nuclear Disarmament.

== Early life ==
Burgon was brought up in Leeds and has distant Irish ancestry. He was educated at Cardinal Heenan Roman Catholic High School in Leeds. He moved to St Aidan's and St John Fisher Associated Sixth Form in Harrogate to complete his A Levels. He was the first person in his immediate family to go to university, studying English Literature at St John's College, Cambridge. He was chair of Cambridge University Labour Club.

Burgon has said that growing up hearing about the 1984–1985 miners' strike initiated his interest in politics. His aunt was a member of Women Against Pit Closures and was married to a striking miner. He is the nephew of the former Labour MP Colin Burgon. Tony Benn described meeting Burgon in July 1999 in his diary, describing him as "a good socialist, [who] had written a thesis on 'Tony Benn's influence on the Labour Party'." Benn also noted that Burgon wore a "specially made" T-shirt which said "Socialism is the Flame of Anger and the Flame of Hope".

Burgon attended the 15 February 2003 anti-war protests against George W. Bush and Tony Blair's planned invasion of Iraq.

== Legal career ==
Burgon qualified as a solicitor in 2006, specialising in employment law for 10 years in the Employment Rights Unit at Thompsons Solicitors in Leeds. Burgon has described how, as a solicitor, he "represented members from a wide range of trade unions in Employment Tribunal cases relating to, for example, unfair dismissal, detriment on trade union grounds, disability discrimination, sex discrimination, discrimination on grounds of religion or belief, unlawful deduction of wages and TUPE."

== Political career ==
In 2004, Burgon first contested a public election as one of the Labour Party candidates for the Wetherby ward of Leeds City Council. On previous boundaries, the ward's majorities suggested a safe seat for the Conservative Party, and Burgon was unsuccessful in being elected.

Burgon stood for selection as the Labour prospective parliamentary candidate for the 2011 Barnsley Central by-election. tying with Dan Jarvis in the penultimate round of voting. Two pieces of paper were put in a hat, and Jarvis won the nomination. He also applied to be selected as the candidate for the 2012 Rotherham by-election, but was not shortlisted. Prior to the 2015 general election, Burgon defeated local councillor Judith Cummins to be successfully selected by the Leeds East Constituency Labour Party to replace George Mudie.

=== Member of Parliament ===
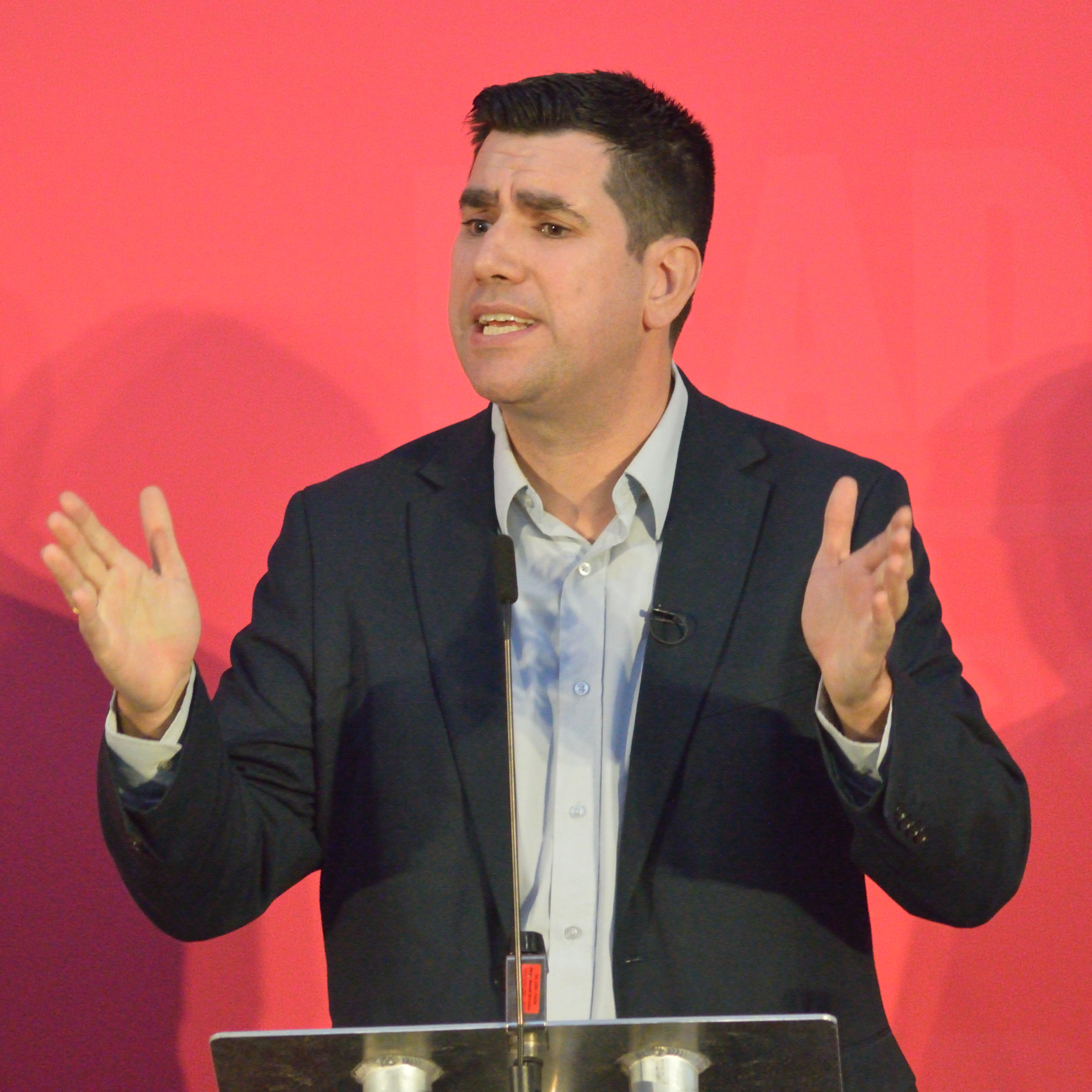
Burgon speaking at the 2020 Labour Party deputy leadership election hustings in Bristol

Burgon was elected as MP for Leeds East at the 2015 general election, increasing the Labour Party's majority in the seat from 10,293 to 12,533 votes.

He was described by The Observer as one of "the stars of the [2015] intake". Standing on the floor of the House of Commons in May 2015, he prefaced his mandatory oath of allegiance to Elizabeth II by expressing his support for constitutional change for an elected head of state: "As someone that believes that the head of state should be elected I make this oath in order to serve my constituents".

Following the resignation of Ed Miliband as Labour leader, Burgon was one of 10 newly elected Labour MPs who wrote an open letter calling for "a new leader who looks forward and will challenge an agenda of cuts, take on big business and will set out an alternative to austerity – not one which will draw back to the New Labour creed of the past". Along with Jeremy Corbyn, Diane Abbott and John McDonnell, Burgon was one of 48 Labour MPs to defy the whip and vote against the 2015 Welfare Bill, explaining that he was voting "for the people of East Leeds and against Conservative attacks on welfare." He was one of 36 Labour MPs to nominate Jeremy Corbyn as a candidate in the Labour leadership election of 2015. Following Corbyn's victory in that campaign he appointed Burgon as Shadow Economic Secretary to the Treasury. He nominated Corbyn again as leader during the 2016 Labour leadership election.

In an October 2015 Channel 4 News interview, Burgon admitted that, despite having been Shadow Economic Secretary to the Treasury for over a month, he was still yet to meet anyone from the city of London's finance and banking industry, nor could he predict the UK budget deficit for 2015.

Burgon is secretary of the GMB Parliamentary Group. In this role, he ensures that issues of interest to GMB members are raised in the House of Commons. Burgon is also a member of the Bakers, Food and Allied Workers' Union. Burgon is the Secretary of the Socialist Campaign Group of Labour MPs, and is regarded as being on the left of the Labour Party; Burgon has supported the People's Assembly Against Austerity, including sponsoring an early day motion welcoming its June 2015 national demonstration. Burgon has called for more democracy within the Labour Party, saying: "All parties need to be made more democratic. We've got a membership of well over half a million and I would like the members to have more say in our party's policies and in the way the party's run."

Burgon successfully defended his Leeds East seat at the December 2019 general election, winning with 19,464 votes (49.8%). His majority of the votes fell from 12,752 in 2017 to 5,531.

He stood in the 2020 Labour Party deputy leadership election, coming third behind Angela Rayner and Rosena Allin-Khan and receiving 21.3% of the vote in the final round.

He was re-elected as the Member of Parliament for Leeds East at the 2024 General Election with an increased majority of over 11,000. In July 2024 he had the whip withdrawn and was suspended from the party for six months as a result of voting for a Scottish National Party amendment to scrap the two child benefit cap. The whip was restored on 5 February 2025.

=== Shadow Justice Secretary ===
Burgon was promoted to Shadow Secretary of State for Justice and Shadow Lord Chancellor on 27 June 2016 following the organised mass resignations in protest against the leadership of Corbyn.

Burgon has called for an end to privatisation in the justice system, labelling privatisation "an ideological experiment ... that has been a calamitous failure", and criticising the part-privatisation of probation by former Justice Secretary Chris Grayling as "a costly failure that has left our communities less safe." As Shadow Justice Secretary Burgon has raised concerns that sustained cuts to the prison service have led to a crisis, with prisons becoming increasingly dangerous for both staff and inmates. He has called for a reversal of Ministry of Justice cuts and for emergency funding to recruit more prison officers and provide prison staff with new equipment, action to end overcrowding and for plans to build new private prisons to be scrapped. At Labour Party Conference in 2017 Burgon announced that a Labour Government would "properly support law centres as engines of empowerment for working-class communities".

In September 2017, the political commentator Iain Dale listed Burgon at Number 86 in 'The 100 Most Influential People on the Left'.

Burgon believes cuts to legal aid are a false economy and deny people justice, saying, "A lack of early legal advice can create unnecessary costs for the taxpayer as legal problems go to court when they could have been resolved earlier or spiral into costly social problems as people lose their homes or jobs ... legal aid cuts have deliberately weakened people's ability to challenge injustices and enforce their rights." In the aftermath of the Windrush scandal, Burgon criticised Conservative cuts to legal aid for immigration cases in Parliament, saying "The Windrush scandal is one of the cruellest examples of unaccountable state power targeting the vulnerable, the defenceless and the innocent that I can ever remember".

On 6 April 2020, upon the election of Keir Starmer as Leader of the Labour Party, Burgon was sacked from the shadow cabinet.

=== International issues ===
Burgon opposed military intervention and the bombing of Syria following the November 2015 Paris attacks by ISIS militants. Burgon opposed the April 2018 missile strikes against Syria. At a protest against the strikes on Parliament Square, he said "The Prime Minister says that bombing of Syria was, in her words, 'right and legal'. I say it was wrong and immoral. It was wrong and immoral because it risks escalating a war that could involve up to a dozen countries. It was wrong because she never waited for the weapons inspectors to do their job. It was wrong because she never waited for Parliament to have its say."

Burgon is a vocal critic of Donald Trump, commenting at the Together Against Trump demo during Trump's state visit to the UK that the US President "scapegoats migrants for all society’s ills while letting the powerful off the hook." He has warned against the consequences of diplomatic tensions between the US and Iran, commenting that Britain could be "dragged into a conflict" and stating that "we don't want to end up being the messengers of Donald Trump".

Burgon has criticised alleged human rights abuses by the Israeli Government and visited the West Bank in March 2016 as part of a group of Labour MPs. Of the visit, Burgon said "I was proud to visit the Occupied Territories of Palestine to show solidarity with the Palestinian people struggling for justice".

On the BBC's Daily Politics in March 2018, he was asked by presenter Andrew Neil about claims that he had said at a 2016 Labour Party meeting that "Zionism is the enemy of peace". Burgon responded, "No and that was not my view", adding "I didn't make those comments". Footage surfaced in April 2019 of Burgon speaking at an event in 2014 where he was recorded saying "The enemy of the Palestinian people is not the Jewish people. The enemy of the Palestinian people are Zionists, and Zionism is the enemy of peace and the enemy of the Palestinian people", which led to accusations that he lied when he denied that this was a view he held. Burgon said that he had not recalled using what he called a "simplistic" phrase that he would not now use.

Burgon has previously expressed support for the PSUV government in Venezuela and tweeted a congratulatory message to Nicolás Maduro when he became president in 2013. On an episode of Question Time in February 2019, Burgon refused to express regret for supporting Maduro following the outbreak of the Venezuelan presidential crisis. He has also expressed support for the Communist Party government in Cuba and spoke at a memorial event for Cuban President Fidel Castro following his death in 2016. During his speech, in which he praised Castro extensively, he stated that "Fidel Castro was a giant. A man of ideas. A man of action".

Burgon has called climate change "the greatest ever market failure. It is a failure driven by capitalism's endless focus on profits whatever the cost", and has expressed support for the School Strike for Climate. He called Corbyn's speech arguing for Parliament to declare a climate emergency "one of the most important ever made in Parliament".

In 2021, Burgon put forward a Ten Minute Rule Bill that would ban arms trade with Israel, supported by Caroline Lucas, Liz Saville Roberts and Tommy Sheppard.

Burgon was criticised in December 2021 when he appeared on LBC for refusing to condemn the persecution of Uyghurs in China by the Chinese government, having stated that doing so would "fuel anti-Chinese racism in our society".

On 24 February 2022, following the 2022 Russian invasion of Ukraine, Burgon was one of 11 Labour MPs threatened with losing the party whip after they signed a statement by the Stop the War Coalition which questioned the legitimacy of NATO and accused the military alliance of "eastward expansion". All 11 MPs subsequently removed their signatures.

In October 2023, 95 MPs signed Early Day Motion 1685: Protecting civilians in Gaza and Israel raised by Richard Burgon, which called for an immediate ceasefire in the hopes of saving the lives of Israeli and Palestinian civilians.

On 15 November 2023, during the Israel–Palestine conflict, Richard Burgon MP was one of 56 Labour MPs to vote in favour of a ceasefire, as part of the SNP's amendment to the King's Speech calling for a ceasefire in Gaza. He was part of a rebellion against leader Keir Starmer's wishes that his MPs abstain from voting for a ceasefire. Saying it was "his duty", he urged political leaders to not "delay while more innocent lives are needlessly lost. Push for a ceasefire and do it now. There is not a second to waste. Let humanity prevail". Burgon was one of three Leeds Labour MPs to vote in favour of a ceasefire, along with his colleagues Fabian Hamilton MP and Alex Sobel MP.

== Libel case against The Sun ==
On 6 February 2019, Burgon won a libel case against The Sun newspaper after it falsely claimed that he had performed with a music group who "delighted" in Nazi imagery. The High Court ruled that the allegations made by The Sun were defamatory and untrue. Burgon was awarded damages of £30,000, which he said would be spent supporting an apprenticeship in Leeds.

== Personal life ==
Burgon is a fan of heavy metal music.

His uncle is Colin Burgon, the former Labour MP for Elmet.

Parliament of the United Kingdom
Preceded by George Mudie	Member of Parliament for Leeds East; 2015–present	Incumbent
Political offices
Preceded by The Lord Falconer of Thoroton	Shadow Secretary of State for Justice; 2016–2020	Succeeded by David Lammy
Preceded by The Lord Falconer of Thoroton	Shadow Lord Chancellor; 2016–2020	Succeeded by David Lammy
