= Dawn Butler =

British politician (born 1969)

Dawn Butler MP
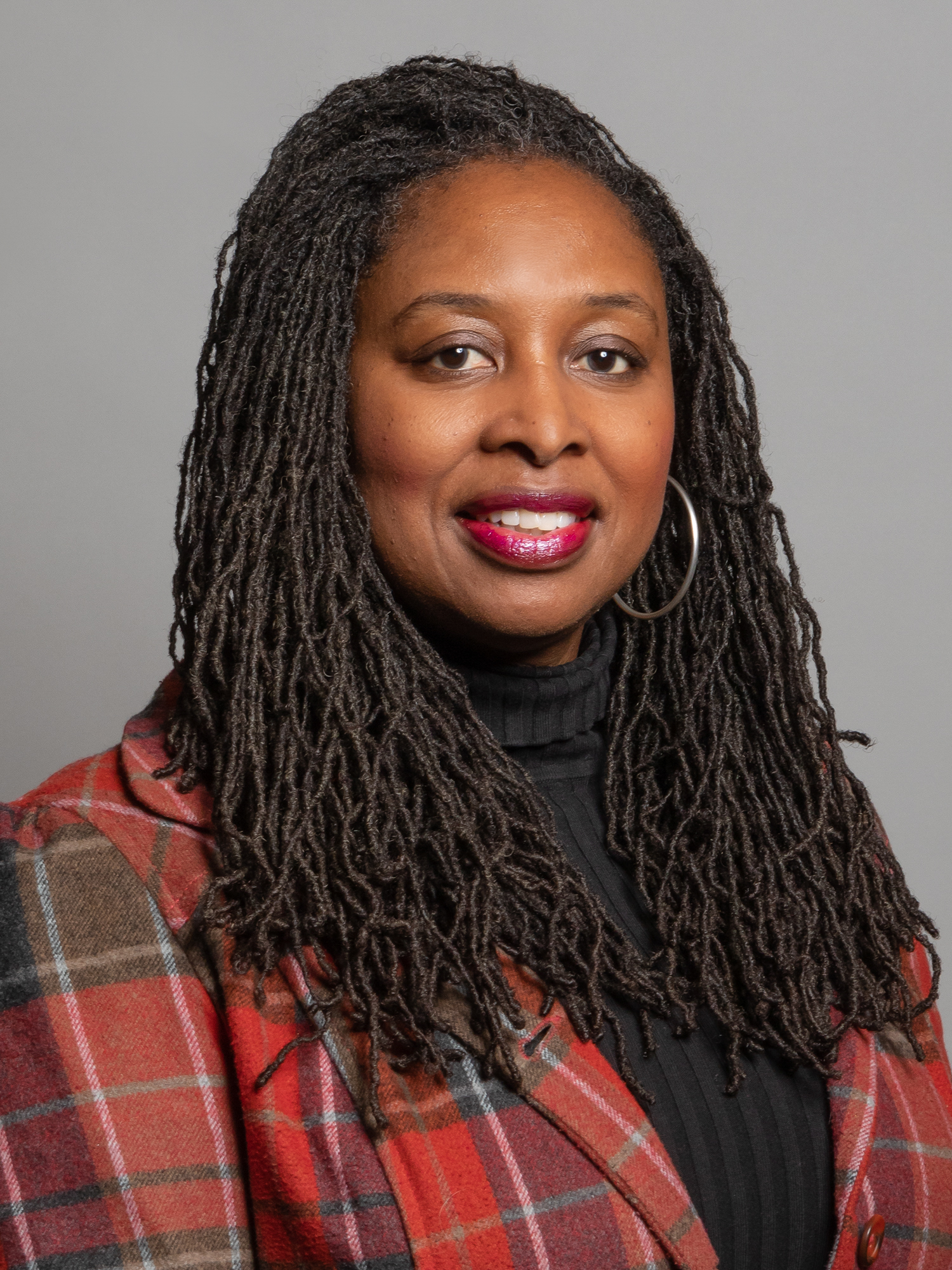
- Official portrait, 2020

Parliamentary Secretary for the Cabinet Office
- In office 3 November 2009 – 11 May 2010
- Prime Minister: Gordon Brown
- Preceded by: Tom Watson
- Succeeded by: Caroline Nokes (Note: Office vacant between 11 May 2010 and 14 June 2017.)

Minister for Young Citizens and Youth Engagement
- In office 30 October 2009 – 11 May 2010
- Prime Minister: Gordon Brown
- Preceded by: Office established
- Succeeded by: Office abolished
Shadow portfolios 2016‍–‍2020
Shadow Secretary of State
2017–2020	Women and Equalities
Shadow Minister
2016–2017 (Note: Office vacant from 1 February 2017 to 14 June 2017.)	Black and Minority Ethnic Communities

Member of Parliament for Brent East Brent Central (2015–2024)
- Incumbent
- Assumed office 7 May 2015
- Preceded by: Sarah Teather
- Majority: 13,047 (34.5%)

Member of Parliament for Brent South
- In office 5 May 2005 – 12 April 2010
- Preceded by: Paul Boateng
- Succeeded by: Constituency abolished

Personal details
- Born: Dawn Petula Butler; 3 November 1969 (age 56) Forest Gate, London, England
- Party: Labour
- Other political affiliations: Socialist Campaign Group
- Website: www.dawnbutler.org.uk

Dawn Petula Butler (born 3 November 1969) is a British Labour Party politician who is member of parliament (MP) for Brent East. She previously served as MP for Brent Central (2015–2024) and Brent South (2005–2010).

Born in London to Jamaican parents, prior to entering politics Butler served as a trade union officer and adviser to the mayor of London, Ken Livingstone. She was elected as the MP for Brent South at the 2005 general election. She served in Prime Minister Gordon Brown's government as Parliamentary Secretary for the Cabinet Office and Minister for Young Citizens and Youth Engagement from 2009 to 2010. Her seat was abolished prior to the 2010 general election, being replaced by Brent Central, which was won by Liberal Democrat candidate Sarah Teather. She returned to parliament as the MP for Brent Central at the 2015 general election. Initially a supporter of Andy Burnham, Butler later became a close ally of Jeremy Corbyn during his tenure as Leader of the Opposition.

In October 2016, Butler was appointed to the new role of Shadow Minister for Black and Minority Ethnic Communities by Corbyn following his re-election as Labour leader. In February 2017, she resigned to vote against the triggering of Article 50, which formally launched the Brexit negotiations, but returned to the portfolio in June of that year before being promoted to the Shadow Cabinet as Shadow Secretary of State for Women and Equalities in the August. She stood in the 2020 Labour Party deputy leadership election and came last, in fifth place. She was removed from the Shadow Cabinet by new Labour leader Keir Starmer in 2020 and returned to the backbenches.

== Early life ==
Butler was born Dawn Petula Butler in Forest Gate in east London, to Jamaican immigrant parents Milo and Ambrozene Butler; she has one sister and four brothers. She was educated at Tom Hood School in Leytonstone and Waltham Forest College, both in London. She worked as an officer of the GMB Union, including time as a national race and equality officer. Butler was also an adviser to the mayor of London, Ken Livingstone, on employment and social issues.

== Parliamentary career ==
=== First term (2005–2010) ===
Butler first sought selection to be a Labour parliamentary candidate in Hackney South and Shoreditch but was unsuccessful. Butler put herself forward for selection for West Ham in 2005 but was not selected. Following the retirement of Paul Boateng to become British High Commissioner to South Africa, she was selected as the Labour candidate in Brent South and retained the seat for her party at the 2005 general election with a majority of 11,326. She was the third black woman to become a British MP after Diane Abbott and Oona King.

Interest in youth services continued as one of her main interests in parliament. On 24 October 2006, she was appointed chair of the All Party Parliamentary Group on Youth Affairs, and she is an honorary vice president of the British Youth Council. After Gordon Brown became prime minister in June 2007, Butler was made one of the Labour Party's six vice chairs, with particular responsibility for youth issues.

In 2006, Butler voted against investigations into the Iraq War. She subsequently voted against investigations a further six times up until 2016. She explained that this was because she believed that it would be wrong to hold investigations "while we still had troops in Iraq ... If you held an inquiry while the troops were still out there doing their best to fight for the country, it would have been soul-destroying for them."

She was appointed to the Select Committee on the Modernisation of the House of Commons shortly after her election, and served on standing committees. In November 2007 she was appointed to the Children, Schools and Families Committee. Earlier (in November 2005), she had been promoted to Parliamentary private secretary to the health minister Jane Kennedy, but decided to stand down from this post in early 2006. She was promoted to assistant whip on 12 September 2008.

In January 2009, Butler received an endorsement from US president Barack Obama. She initially denied that her office had written it but later corrected herself and clarified that the endorsement had been written by her staff with the consent of Obama's aides, then signed by Obama when they met.

Butler was named female MP of the year at the 2009 Women in Public Life awards. Following her appointment as Minister for Young Citizens and Youth Engagement, Butler became the first black woman to speak from the despatch box in the House of Commons in December 2009. She later said that Conservative MPs "tried to belittle me at that moment in history", specifying that one Tory MP "took great delight in telling me that ‘upskilling’ was not in the English dictionary".

=== Expenses ===
In March 2009, Butler was criticised for claiming the second home allowance, despite her main home in Stratford being the same distance from parliament as her Brent South home; however, her office stressed that she moved into the Wembley house after being elected in 2005 to allow her to serve her constituents. Following a number of errors in 2005–8, which resulted in a £2,600 overcharge, and after discussion with the Parliamentary Fees Office, most of the overcharge was offset against later expenses, with the remainder repaid.

=== Boundary changes ===
Butler's constituency of Brent South was abolished at the 2010 general election. Its territory was mostly divided between two constituencies: a new Brent Central seat and a re-drawn Brent North. Butler was selected as the Labour candidate in Brent Central but lost to Sarah Teather, the Liberal Democrat candidate, who had been the MP for Brent East, which had also been abolished at the general election.

During her time outside of parliament, she worked creating learning programmes for companies.

=== Second term (2015–present) ===
In 2013, Butler was selected as the Labour candidate for Brent Central at the general election in 2015. Prior to the election, Teather had announced she would stand down from parliament, so she did not contest the seat. Butler was returned to parliament with a majority of more than 19,000 votes.

Butler is a former chair of the Women's Parliamentary Labour Party. Following a vote in September 2016, she was succeeded by Jess Phillips.

==== 2015 leadership election ====
Butler supported Andy Burnham in the 2015 Labour Leadership Election. However, she 'lent' her nomination to Jeremy Corbyn to ensure he was on the ballot.

After Jeremy Corbyn was re-elected leader in 2016, Butler was appointed as Labour's Shadow Minister for Black and Minority Ethnic Communities in October 2016.

==== Resignation from Jeremy Corbyn's frontbench ====
In February 2017, Butler resigned from Corbyn's frontbench before the vote on the second reading in the House of Commons of the European Union (Notification of Withdrawal) Act 2017, which triggered Article 50. The vote carried a three-line whip instructing Labour MPs to vote in favour.

In March 2017, Butler used British Sign Language to ask a question in the House of Commons about giving this language legal recognition. She was reappointed as Shadow Minister for Black and Minority Ethnic Communities in June 2017. In the same month, she launched a new cross-party parliamentary group, the Parliamentary Black Caucus, concerned with ethnic minority issues.

==== Shadow Women and Equalities Secretary ====
In August 2017, following the resignation of Sarah Champion, Butler was promoted to the Shadow Cabinet as the Shadow Secretary of State for Women and Equalities. In February 2018 she appointed businessman Anthony Watson as an LGBT+ advisor.

In September 2018, she argued that the actions of the Militant-dominated Liverpool City Council in the early 1980s could be an inspiration for current Labour councils faced with public-sector funding constraints. In the same month, Butler was promoted to a Shadow Secretary of State title, as it was announced that Women and Equalities would be upgraded to a full government department under a Labour government.

In October 2019, one of Corbyn's advisors accused Butler of homophobia after she said that "90 per cent of giraffes are gay", while arguing that homosexuality is not something that is taught, at the PinkNews awards.

In February 2020, Butler was criticised following an interview with Richard Madeley on Good Morning Britain during which she stated that: "A child is born without sex". She was taking part in a debate about reactions to updates to the Gender Recognition Act 2004 which were proposed by the governing Conservative Party. Butler later said that she was referring to gender neutrality, where people can identify as non-binary.

==== 2020 deputy leadership election ====
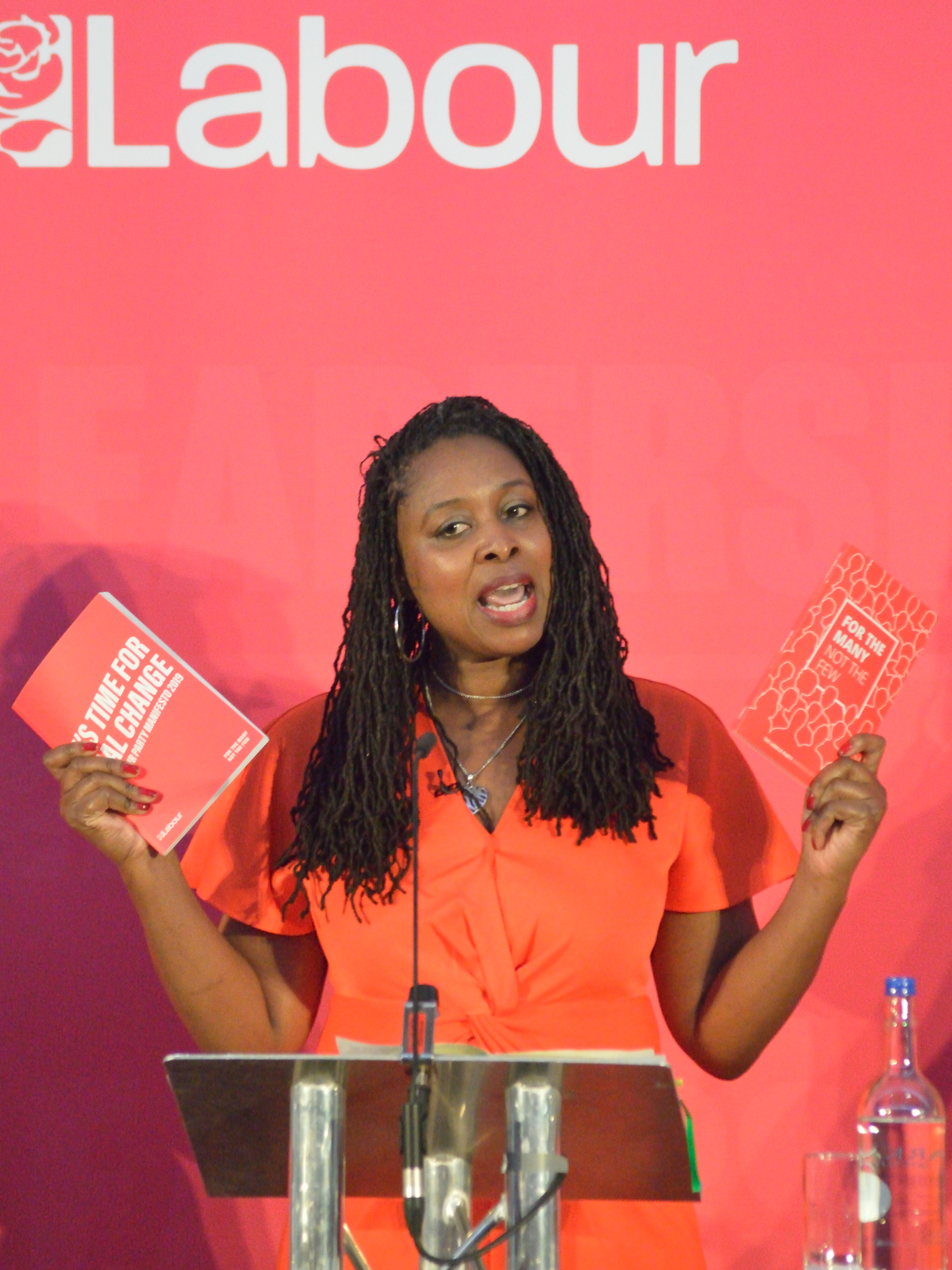
Butler speaking at the deputy leadership hustings in Bristol

Butler was reelected in the 2019 general election. Butler became the first candidate to declare candidacy in the 2020 Labour Party deputy leadership election. She has been described as a close ally of Jeremy Corbyn and often sat by Corbyn's side on the opposition frontbench in parliament. Butler ultimately received 50,255 (10.9%) of first preference ballots, the least of the five candidates, eliminating her from the contest and seeing her second preference votes redistributed to the remaining candidates, with Angela Rayner ultimately winning the contest. In an interview in August 2020, she was critical of the large costs involved in campaigning in the deputy leadership election, stating she did not think that an internal election should mean a candidate should have to spend a lot of money.

==== Return to the backbenches ====
Following the election of Keir Starmer as Leader of the Labour Party, Butler was not appointed to the new Shadow Cabinet and was succeeded by Marsha de Cordova.

In July 2020, Butler was forced to close her constituency office due to increased costs of maintaining premises, and alleged escalating racist threats towards her and her staff, which increased following an article she wrote defending Black Lives Matter protests in the UK.

In an interview with The Guardian published on 4 August 2020, Butler called for the resignation of the Metropolitan Police commissioner Cressida Dick, and the end of Stop and Search powers in the UK, which she called "discriminatory".

Butler accused the Metropolitan Police of racial profiling after she was in a car in Hackney which was stopped by police on 9 August 2020, as they wrongly believed the car was registered in North Yorkshire, saying "there's people who have been coming into the area". Butler then said that this experience shows the Metropolitan Police is institutionally racist. The police officers involved admitted they made a mistake and apologised. The Police Federation of England and Wales responded that she was mistaken and called for body worn camera footage to be released. They criticised her for not allowing them to police London.

In September 2020, Butler was criticised after she praised, in a tweet later deleted, Extinction Rebellion protestors who blocked the printworks of several major newspapers.

Butler was criticised for her failure to sign on to the Board of Deputies of British Jews' "Ten pledges to end the antisemitism crisis"; she stated that "I haven't signed the 10 pledges because I want the EHRC report to be implemented in the party. And then we sit down with the Board of Deputies, JLM, the other Jewish groups, and we have a discussion about where we go next. I don’t want to rush this. It’s too important to rush it and we have to get it right".

In April 2021, Butler was one of a number of MPs who signed a letter to the government opposing vaccine passports.

On 8 July 2021, the Crown Prosecution Service authorised Cheshire Police to charge a 70-year-old man from Warrington with sending an offensive message to Butler. On 17 August 2021, he was handed a six-week prison sentence, suspended for 12 months.

On 22 July 2021, Butler was ordered to leave the House of Commons by acting deputy speaker Judith Cummins, after she made comments calling the Prime Minister Boris Johnson a liar. After being asked to reconsider her comments, she remarked "Madam Deputy Speaker, what would you rather: a weakened leg or a severed leg? At the end of the day, the Prime Minister has lied to this house time and time again."

In June 2022, she wrote in favour of the vote of confidence in the Conservative Party leadership of Boris Johnson.

In the 2024 general election she contested the newly formed constituency of Brent East. In the election she was re-elected with a reduced majority. Following the election Butler was a candidate to be chair of the Science, Innovation and Technology Select Committee.

Butler supported claims from Caribbean countries for slavery reparations to be paid to them by the British.

In November 2024, Butler was criticised by Tory MPs for retweeting a post from British-Nigerian author Nels Abbey, which described newly elected Conservative Party leader Kemi Badenoch as "the most prominent member of white supremacy's black collaborator class". Butler quickly deleted the retweet. Abbey later said that his original comments were intended as "clearly satirical" and intended as a sketch. He defended Butler, stating that many in the black community might not see Badenoch’s leadership as a positive due to her political stance. Several Conservative politicians called on Starmer to suspend Butler, stating that Starmer had suspended the whip from Labour MPs who had made remarks about senior black Conservatives in the past. Starmer did not suspend the whip from Butler but did state that Butler "shouldn't have said what she did".

In 2025, she joined the Mainstream political organisation of Andy Burnham.

== Personal life ==
Butler was diagnosed with breast cancer in December 2021 and underwent a mastectomy.

== Notes ==
Parliament of the United Kingdom
Preceded by Paul Boateng	Member of Parliament for Brent South; 2005–2010	Constituency abolished
Preceded by Sarah Teather	Member of Parliament for Brent Central; 2015–2024	Constituency abolished
New constituency	Member of Parliament for Brent East; 2024–present	Incumbent
Political offices
New office	Shadow Minister for Black and Minority Ethnic Communities; 2016–2017	Vacant
Vacant	Shadow Minister for Black and Minority Ethnic Communities; 2017	Succeeded by Naz Shah
Preceded by Sarah Champion	Shadow Secretary of State for Women and Equalities; 2017–2020	Succeeded by Marsha de Cordova
