= Sarah Teather, Baroness Teather =

British Liberal Democrat politician

The Right Honourable The Baroness Teather
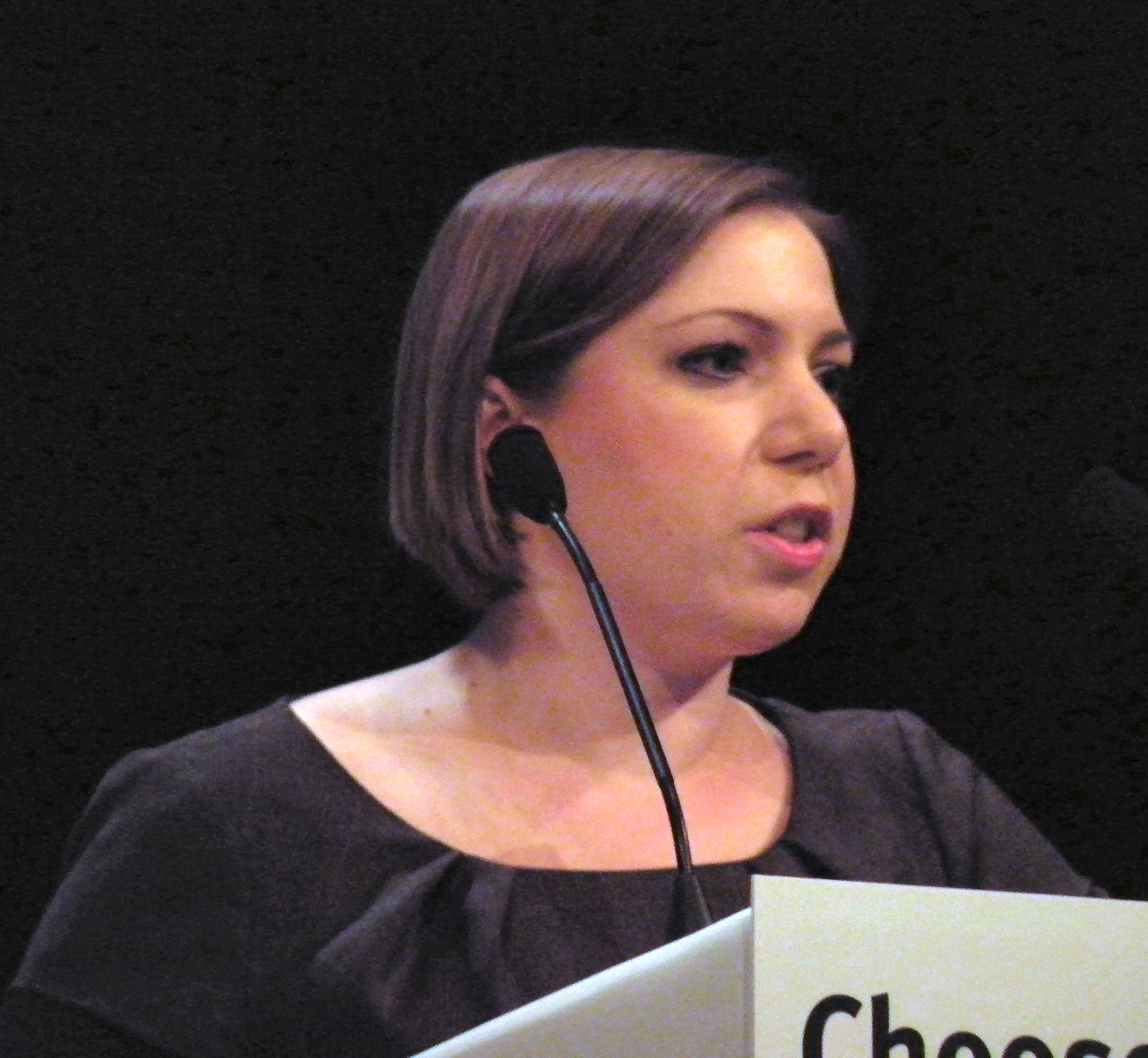
- Teather in 2009

Minister of State for Children and Families
- In office 13 May 2010 – 4 September 2012
- Prime Minister: David Cameron
- Preceded by: Dawn Primarolo
- Succeeded by: Liz Truss

Member of Parliament for Brent Central Brent East (2003–2010)
- In office 18 September 2003 – 30 March 2015
- Preceded by: Paul Daisley
- Succeeded by: Dawn Butler

Islington London Borough Councillor
- In office 2 May 2002 – 23 September 2003
- Ward: Hillrise
- Preceded by: Sheila Camp
- Succeeded by: Jayashankar Sharma

Liberal Democrat portfolios
- 2006–2007: Education and Skills
- 2007: Innovation, Universities and Skills
- 2007–2008: Business, Enterprise and Regulatory Reform
- 2008–2010: Housing

Member of the House of Lords
- Lord Temporal
- Life peerage 27 January 2026

Personal details
- Born: Sarah Louise Teather; 1 June 1974 (age 52) Enfield, London, England
- Party: Liberal Democrats
- Education: St John's College, Cambridge
- Website: Official website

Sarah Louise Teather, Baroness Teather (born 1 June 1974) is a British politician and advocate who served as Member of Parliament (MP) for Brent Central, previously Brent East, from 2003 to 2015, and as Minister of State for Children and Families from 2010 to 2012. A member of the Liberal Democrats, she founded the All-Party Parliamentary Group on Guantanamo Bay and was chairman of the All-Party Parliamentary Group on Refugees. On stepping down as an MP, she joined the Jesuit Refugee Service as an advocacy adviser and was appointed as country director of the Service in the UK in December 2015.

After serving on Islington London Borough Council, she was first elected as an MP at the 2003 Brent East by-election and was re-elected with an increased majority at the 2005 general election. After the seat was abolished due to boundary changes, Teather was selected as the Liberal Democrat candidate for the successor seat, Brent Central. Her main opponent was sitting Labour MP Dawn Butler, whose Brent South seat was also abolished. Teather won by a small margin, and, after the election, she served as Minister of State in the Department for Education in the coalition government between the Conservatives and the Liberal Democrats until she returned to the backbenches on 4 September 2012. She did not stand in the 2015 general election.

== Early life ==
Teather was born on 1 June 1974 in Enfield, London, England. She was educated at the independent Leicester Grammar School and St John's College, Cambridge, where she gained a 2:1 degree in Natural Sciences specialising in pharmacology.

Teather initially embarked on a PhD at University College London, but left the course at the end of her first year. She went on to work as a policy adviser for a number of prominent groups including the Royal Society and the charity Macmillan Cancer Relief.

Teather first contested an election on 7 June 2001 in the seat of Finchley and Golders Green. On 3 May 2002 she was elected to Islington London Borough Council as one of the three councillors representing Hillrise ward. She was then appointed by the council to serve as a school governor at Ashmount Primary School.

Subsequent to her first election as an MP she resigned from Islington Council, resigned as a school governor at Ashmount Primary and withdrew as a candidate for the Greater London Assembly seat in North East London.

== In Westminster and Whitehall ==
=== Member of Parliament ===
In 2003 Teather was selected as the party's candidate in the Brent East by-election, which was called after the death of the Labour MP Paul Daisley.

The by-election took place during the early stages of the Iraq War, which the Liberal Democrats strongly opposed under leader Charles Kennedy, and was a controversial involvement denting support for the Labour government. The Liberal Democrats came from third place behind Labour and the Conservatives, with a 39.12% share of the total and 1,118 majority. At 29, Teather became the youngest Member of Parliament, known as Baby of the House. The by-election was Labour's first by-election defeat in 15 years.

In her maiden speech when first elected as an MP in 2003, she spoke about her opposition to tuition fees:

Fear of debt is as real to many people as real debt. Top-up and tuition fees are serious issues of concern to my constituents. All the evidence suggests that fear of debt will deter those from lower income families and ethnic minority communities. This is particularly the case for Muslims – a large community in my constituency – where attitudes to debt are very different. ... I hope honourable members will oppose the measures when the time comes.

She successfully defended her seat in the 2005 general election, increasing her majority to over 2,700. In May 2009, she was listed by The Daily Telegraph as one of the "Saints" in the expenses scandal. In Autumn 2006, she spent a week observing in schools, writing a daily blog of the experience for Guardian Unlimited.

On 31 August 2006, she announced her intention to stand for the new Brent Central constituency. In her campaign for re-election in May 2010, Teather reiterated her opposition to tuition fees, signing a pledge to vote against them. She defeated by 1,300 votes the Labour candidate Dawn Butler, who had been the MP for Brent South in the previous parliament, despite Butler having a notional 50.1% share of the vote in the new constituency.

She established the All-Party Parliamentary Group on Guantanamo Bay in March 2007, and used the group to campaign against the detention without charge of Jamil el-Banna, a constituent. She visited Washington twice to lobby on his behalf, and also worked closely on the case with the anti-death penalty charity, Reprieve and Amnesty International.

=== Liberal Democrats Frontbench Team ===
In parliament Teather became one of the highest-profile Liberal Democrat MPs. Initially acting as her party's spokesperson on London, after the 2005 general election she was promoted to the front bench to serve as Liberal Democrat spokesperson on Community and Local Government.

On 6 January 2006, 25 Liberal Democrat MPs signed a letter drafted by Teather and fellow frontbencher Ed Davey, indicating their unwillingness to continue working under party leader Charles Kennedy. The Guardian claimed the letter to be "the most damning" of the publicly expressed sentiments regarding Kennedy's position, and later that day Kennedy announced his resignation. Teather supported Sir Menzies Campbell in the subsequent leadership election.

She was promoted again to Education spokesperson following Sir Menzies Campbell's election as leader on 2 March 2006. In 2007 Teather became Business spokesperson, followed by becoming Housing spokesperson from 2008.

=== Minister in the coalition government ===
Following the formation of the coalition government in May 2010 Teather became Minister of State for Children and Families.

In September 2010 The Sunday Times reported that she had been accused by several members of parliament of lobbying her boss, the Education Secretary Michael Gove, for two schools in her constituency to be spared from the government's plans to cancel refurbishment projects on over 700 schools nationwide.The plans for refurbishment of the two schools, which had been previously cancelled, was reinstated.

On 13 July 2011, Teather told the Family and Parenting Institute that she was extremely worried about the £26,000 Benefit Cap that the Coalition Government was introducing as part of the Welfare Reform Act 2012. Teather then failed to turn up to a number of key votes on the Welfare Reform Act despite there being a three-line whip, which resulted in a number of Conservative backbench MPs publicly calling for her to be sacked.

In April 2011, Teather was questioned on BBC Television's Question Time over replacing the Education Maintenance Allowance. Arguing against the claim that fewer poor pupils would be served by its replacement, Teather claimed that it would actually be targeted better at those who actually needed government support.

On 6 February 2012 Teather was part of a ministerial working group together with Tim Loughton and justice minister Jonathan Djanogly that was asked to come up with proposals within two months on how the law should be changed regarding how to amend the Children Act of 1989. According to The Guardian of 3 February 2012, that working group is aimed to include in the new Children Act one "presumption of shared parenting" for children's fathers and mothers after cases of divorce or spousal break-up.

On 4 September 2012, she was sacked from her post, as part of a broad government reshuffle, and returned to the backbenches.

=== Post-ministerial activities ===
After leaving Government, Teather gave an interview to The Observer newspaper, in which she called the Benefit Cap "immoral and divisive". She then voted against the coalition for the first time, on a deferred division on the final regulations needed to put the Benefit Cap in place. In late 2012, Teather chaired a Parliamentary inquiry into asylum support for children and young people, which was supported by The Children's Society.

In February 2013, Teather voted against the Marriage (Same Sex Couples) Bill at its second reading. She later expressed regret for this vote, writing that she has since "thanked God that I was then in an irrelevant minority".

On 7 September 2013, Teather released a statement through her website to announce she would not contest the 2015 general election, saying her decision was "to do with some aspects of government policy", adding that she "no longer feels that Nick Clegg's party fights sufficiently for social justice and liberal values on immigration".

On 3 March 2015, the All Party Parliamentary Group on Refugees and the All Party Parliamentary Group on Migration published a report on the use of immigration detention. The inquiry panel, chaired by Sarah Teather, found that "the UK uses detention disproportionately and inappropriately" and recommended that a time limit of 28 days be introduced as the maximum length of time an individual can be held in an immigration removal centre.

== Later career ==
Teather stood down as the MP for Brent Central at the 2015 general election and joined the International Advocacy team of the Jesuit Refugee Service in June 2015. As an advocacy advisor, she visited JRS projects all over the world, including: Lebanon, South Sudan, Uganda, North Macedonia and the southern coast of Italy where thousands of migrants were attempting dangerous overseas crossings to mainland Europe across the Mediterranean Sea. On 3 December 2015, it was announced that Teather had been appointed as the country director of JRS UK.

=== House of Lords ===
In December 2025, as part of the 2025 Political Peerages, it was announced that Teather would become a life peer to sit in the House of Lords as a Liberal Democrat peer; she was created as Baroness Teather, of Broughton in the County of Leicestershire on 27 January 2026.

Teather made her maiden speech in the House of Lords on 12 March 2026.

== Personal life ==
Teather is Catholic. She is married to a man who is a wheelchair user. At 4 feet 10 inches (1.47 m), she was the shortest woman member of Parliament in British history.

== See also ==
- Liberal Democrat frontbench team

Parliament of the United Kingdom
Preceded by Paul Daisley	Member of Parliament for Brent East; 2003–2010	Constituency abolished
New constituency	Member of Parliament for Brent Central; 2010–2015	Succeeded by Dawn Butler
Preceded by David Lammy	Baby of the House; 2003–2005	Succeeded by Jo Swinson
Political offices
Preceded by Dawn Primarolo as Minister of State for Children, Young People and Families	Minister of State for Children and Families; 2010–2012	Succeeded by Elizabeth Truss as Undersecretary of State for Education and Childcare
