= Brent East =

UK Parliament constituency (1974–2010, 2024 onwards)

Coordinates: 51.55°N 0.23°W

- Borough constituency for the House of Commons
- Interactive map of boundaries from 2024
- Location within Greater London
- County: Greater London
- Electorate: 75,880 (March 2020)
- Borough: London Borough of Brent

Current constituency
- Created: 2024
- Member of Parliament: Dawn Butler (Labour)
- Seats: 1
- Created from: Brent Central, Brent North and Hampstead and Kilburn

1974–2010
- Type of constituency: Borough constituency
- Created from: Willesden East (similar boundaries); Willesden West (minor parts)
- Replaced by: Brent Central (bulk); Hampstead and Kilburn (part)

Brent East is a parliamentary constituency in north west London. It returns one Member of Parliament (MP) to the House of Commons of the Parliament of the United Kingdom, elected by the first past the post system.

The seat first existed between 1974 and 2010 and was re-established under the 2023 review of Westminster constituencies which came into effect for the 2024 general election. In the intervening period, the seat was largely replaced by Brent Central.

The constituency is currently represented for the Labour Party by Dawn Butler, who previously served as MP for Brent Central (2015–2024) and Brent South (2005–2010).

== Constituency profile ==
The Brent East constituency is located within the Borough of Brent in North London. It is almost entirely urban in nature and contains the neighbourhoods of Willesden, Dollis Hill and Kingsbury. The area experienced deprivation and overcrowding in the late 20th century but has recently seen increasing gentrification. Brent is extremely ethnically diverse. People born outside the United Kingdom make up 56% of residents, the highest rate of any local authority in the country. Brent has the highest proportion of Irish people in Great Britain and the country's largest Brazilian community. Brent East constituency contains BAPS Shri Swaminarayan Mandir London, once the largest Hindu temple outside India.

On average, residents of the constituency have lower household income and lower levels of education, professional employment and home ownership compared to the rest of London. Much of the constituency is in the 10% most deprived areas in the country, although the Brondesbury area is generally wealthier and more suburban in character. White British people make up 17% of the population, 17% are White of other backgrounds, 22% are Asian, 22% are Black and 7% are Arabs. The constituency is ethnically divided; the White population is concentrated in Brondesbury, the Asian population in Kingsbury and the Black population in the west of Willesden.

At the most recent borough council election in 2022, all seats in the constituency were won by the Labour Party. An estimated 60% of voters in Brent East favoured remaining in the European Union in the 2016 referendum, in line with the rest of London and higher than the country as a whole.

== History ==
The constituency was created in 1974 and was first contested at the February general election of that year. It was held by Reg Freeson from 1974 to 1987, then by Ken Livingstone (following the abolition of the Greater London Council, of which he was leader, in 1986).

An ethnically diverse area, it was previously one of the Labour Party's safest seats in London. In 1971, 19.3% were non-White. In 1981, 30% of the constituency were non-White. The constituency had the highest concentration (10.5% of the population) of Irish born people in 1981.

After Livingstone was expelled from the Labour Party for standing as an independent candidate for Mayor of London in 2000, he represented the constituency as an independent until standing down as an MP in 2001 to concentrate on his position as Mayor. Labour regained the seat at the 2001 general election, with Paul Daisley holding the seat until his death two years later.

The resulting Brent East by-election was held on 18 September 2003, with the 2003 Invasion of Iraq as a background. Labour lost the seat to Sarah Teather of the Liberal Democrats, with a considerable 29% swing, having come from a distant third place in 2001. Teather retained the seat at the 2005 general election, with a majority of 2,712 votes and a swing of 30.7% from Labour to the Liberal Democrats compared to the previous general election.

== Boundaries ==
=== Historic ===
The original constituency was one of three covering the London Borough of Brent in north-west London, covering the areas of Brondesbury, Dollis Hill, Kilburn and Neasden, as well as parts of Willesden and Cricklewood.

1974–1983: The London Borough of Brent wards of Brentwater, Brondesbury Park, Carlton, Church End, Cricklewood, Gladstone, Kilburn, Mapesbury, Queen's Park, and Willesden Green.

1983–2010: The London Borough of Brent wards of Brentwater, Brondesbury Park, Carlton, Chamberlayne, Church End, Cricklewood, Gladstone, Kilburn, Mapesbury, Queen's Park, and Willesden Green.

=== Current ===
Further to the 2023 boundary review, the constituency is composed of the following wards of the London Borough of Brent:

- Brondesbury Park; Cricklewood & Mapesbury; Dollis Hill; Kingsbury; Roundwood; Stonebridge; Welsh Harp; Willesden Green.

The re-established seat primarily comprises the majority of the abolished Brent Central constituency, with Brondesbury Park and Kingsbury wards coming from the abolished constituencies of Hampstead and Kilburn, and Brent North respectively.

== Members of Parliament ==
Election	Member	Party
Feb 1974	Reg Freeson	Labour
1987	Ken Livingstone	Labour
2000	Ken Livingstone	Independent
2001	Paul Daisley	Labour
2003 by-election	Sarah Teather	Liberal Democrat
2010	constituency abolished: see Brent Central & Hampstead and Kilburn	
2024	Dawn Butler	Labour

== Election results ==
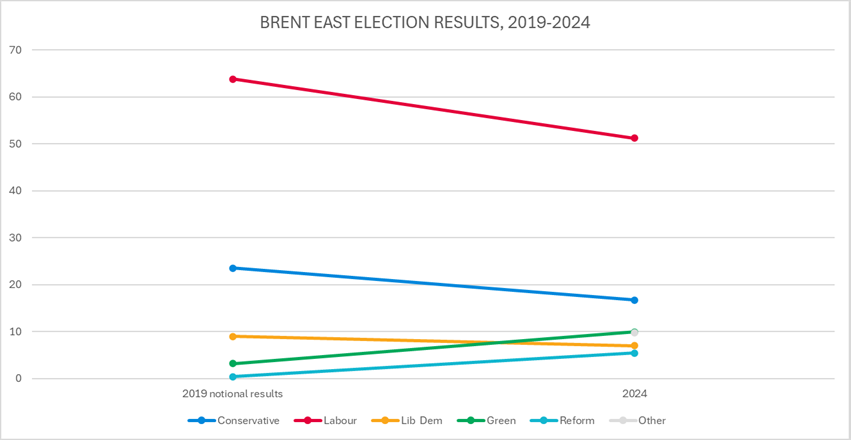
Election results 2019–2024

=== Elections in the 2020s ===
General election 2024: Brent East
Party	Candidate	Votes	%	±%
Labour	Dawn Butler	19,370	51.2	–12.6
Conservative	Jamila Robertson	6,323	16.7	–6.8
Green	Nida Al-Fulaij	3,729	9.9	+6.7
Liberal Democrats	Jonny Singh	2,635	7.0	–2.0
Reform	Zbigniew Kowalczyk	2,024	5.4	+5.0
Independent	Aadil Shaikh	1,846	4.9	N/A
Workers Party	James Mutimer	1,052	2.8	N/A
Independent	Amin Moafi	654	1.7	N/A
Independent	Jenner Folwell	169	0.4	N/A
Majority		13,047	34.5	–5.8
Turnout		37,802	48.9	–9.1
Registered electors		77,257		
Labour hold		Swing	▼2.9	

=== Elections in the 2010s ===
2019 notional result (Note: Estimate of the 2019 general election result as if the revised boundaries recommended under the 2023 boundary review were in place)
Party	Vote	%
Labour	28,100	63.8
Conservative	10,344	23.5
Liberal Democrats	3,972	9.0
Green	1,426	3.2
Brexit Party	175	0.4
Majority	17,756	40.3
Turnout	44,017	58.0
Electorate	75,880	

=== Elections in the 2000s ===
General election 2005: Brent East
Party	Candidate	Votes	%	±%
Liberal Democrats	Sarah Teather	14,764	47.5	+36.9
Labour	Yasmin Qureshi	12,052	38.8	−24.4
Conservative	Kwasi Kwarteng	3,193	10.3	–7.9
Green	Shahrar Ali	905	2.9	–1.8
Independent	Michelle Weininger	115	0.4	N/A
Rainbow Dream Ticket	Rainbow George Weiss	39	0.1	N/A
Majority		2,712	8.7	N/A
Turnout		31,068	55.3	+3.4
Liberal Democrats gain from Labour		Swing	+29.0	

By-election 2003: Brent East
Party	Candidate	Votes	%	±%
Liberal Democrats	Sarah Teather	8,158	39.1	+28.5
Labour	Robert Evans	7,040	33.8	−29.4
Conservative	Uma Fernandes	3,368	16.2	−2.0
Green	Noel Lynch	638	3.1	−1.6
Socialist Alliance	Brian Butterworth	361	1.7	N/A
Public Services Not War	Fawzi Ibrahim	219	1.1	N/A
Independent	Winston McKenzie	197	0.9	N/A
Independent	Kelly McBride	189	0.9	N/A
Independent	Harold Immanuel	188	0.9	N/A
UKIP	Brian Hall	140	0.7	+0.1
Socialist Labour	Iris Cremer	111	0.5	−0.8
Independent	Neil Walsh	101	0.5	N/A
Monster Raving Loony	Alan Hope	59	0.3	N/A
No description	Aaron Barschak	37	0.2	N/A
No description	Jitendra Bardwaj	35	0.2	N/A
www.xat.org	Rainbow George Weiss	11	0.1	N/A
Majority		1,118	5.4	N/A
Turnout		20,752	36.2	−15.7
Liberal Democrats gain from Labour		Swing	+29.0	

General election 2001: Brent East
Party	Candidate	Votes	%	±%
Labour	Paul Daisley	18,325	63.2	−4.1
Conservative	David Gauke	5,278	18.2	−4.1
Liberal Democrats	Norsheen Bhatti	3,065	10.6	+2.8
Green	Simone Aspis	1,361	4.7	N/A
ProLife Alliance	Sarah Macken	392	1.4	+0.8
Socialist Labour	Iris Cremer	383	1.3	N/A
UKIP	Ashwin Tanna	188	0.6	N/A
Majority		13,047	45.0	0.0
Turnout		28,992	51.9	−14.0
Labour hold		Swing	0.0	

=== Elections in the 1990s ===
General election 1997: Brent East
Party	Candidate	Votes	%	±%
Labour	Ken Livingstone	23,748	67.3	+14.5
Conservative	Mark Francois	7,866	22.3	−14.3
Liberal Democrats	Ian Hunter	2,751	7.8	−1.1
Socialist Labour	Stan Keable	466	1.3	N/A
ProLife Alliance	Andrew Shanks	218	0.6	N/A
Rainbow Dream Ticket	Claire Warrilow	120	0.3	N/A
Natural Law	Dean Jenkins	103	0.3	N/A
Majority		15,882	45.0	+28.8
Turnout		35,272	65.9	−2.9
Labour hold		Swing	+14.4	

General election 1992: Brent East
Party	Candidate	Votes	%	±%
Labour	Ken Livingstone	19,387	52.8	+10.2
Conservative	Damian Green	13,416	36.6	−1.8
Liberal Democrats	Mark Cummins	3,249	8.9	−5.6
Green	Theresa Deen	548	1.5	N/A
Communist	Anne Murphy	96	0.3	N/A
Majority		5,971	16.2	+12.0
Turnout		36,696	68.8	+4.3
Labour hold		Swing		

=== Elections in the 1980s ===
General election 1987: Brent East
Party	Candidate	Votes	%	±%
Labour	Ken Livingstone	16,772	42.6	−4.4
Conservative	Harriet Crawley	15,119	38.4	+3.8
SDP	Daniel Finkelstein	5,710	14.5	−2.4
Independent Labour	Riaz Dooley	1,035	2.6	N/A
Green	Miles Litvnoff	716	1.8	N/A
Majority		1,653	4.2	−8.2
Turnout		39,352	64.5	+0.9
Labour hold		Swing	−4.1	

General election 1983: Brent East
Party	Candidate	Votes	%	±%
Labour	Reg Freeson	18,363	47.0	−6.3
Conservative	Robert Lacey	13,529	34.6	−2.1
SDP	Maurice Rosen	6,598	16.9	N/A
Independent	James O'Leary	289	0.7	N/A
Workers Revolutionary	Gerald Downing	222	0.6	−0.2
Independent	K. Radclyffe	88	0.2	N/A
Majority		4,834	12.4	−4.2
Turnout		39,088	63.6	−3.3
Labour hold		Swing		

=== Elections in the 1970s ===
General election 1979: Brent East
Party	Candidate	Votes	%	±%
Labour	Reg Freeson	20,351	53.3	−0.7
Conservative	John Howes	14,008	36.7	+6.2
Liberal	Chris Wilding	2,799	7.3	−4.3
National Front	John Davies	706	1.9	−1.0
Workers Revolutionary	Gerald Downing	290	0.8	N/A
Majority		6,343	16.6	−6.9
Turnout		38,155	66.9	+6.9
Labour hold		Swing		

General election October 1974: Brent East
Party	Candidate	Votes	%	±%
Labour	Reg Freeson	20,481	54.0	+4.7
Conservative	Michael Knowles	11,554	30.5	−1.0
Liberal	P. O'Brien	4,416	11.6	−7.6
National Front	N. Lyons	1,096	2.9	N/A
Irish Civil Rights	J. Curran	382	1.0	N/A
Majority		8,927	23.5	+5.6
Turnout		37,929	60.0	−8.0
Labour hold		Swing		

General election February 1974: Brent East
Party	Candidate	Votes	%	±%
Labour	Reg Freeson	21,063	49.3	
Conservative	G. K. Young	13,441	31.5	
Liberal	W. Perry	8,204	19.2	
Majority		7,622	17.9	
Turnout		42,708	68.0	
Labour win (new seat)				

== See also ==
- Parliamentary constituencies in London
