= 2003 Brent East by-election =

By-election to the Parliament of the United Kingdom

- 18 September 2003

Brent East parliamentary seat
- Turnout: 36.2%
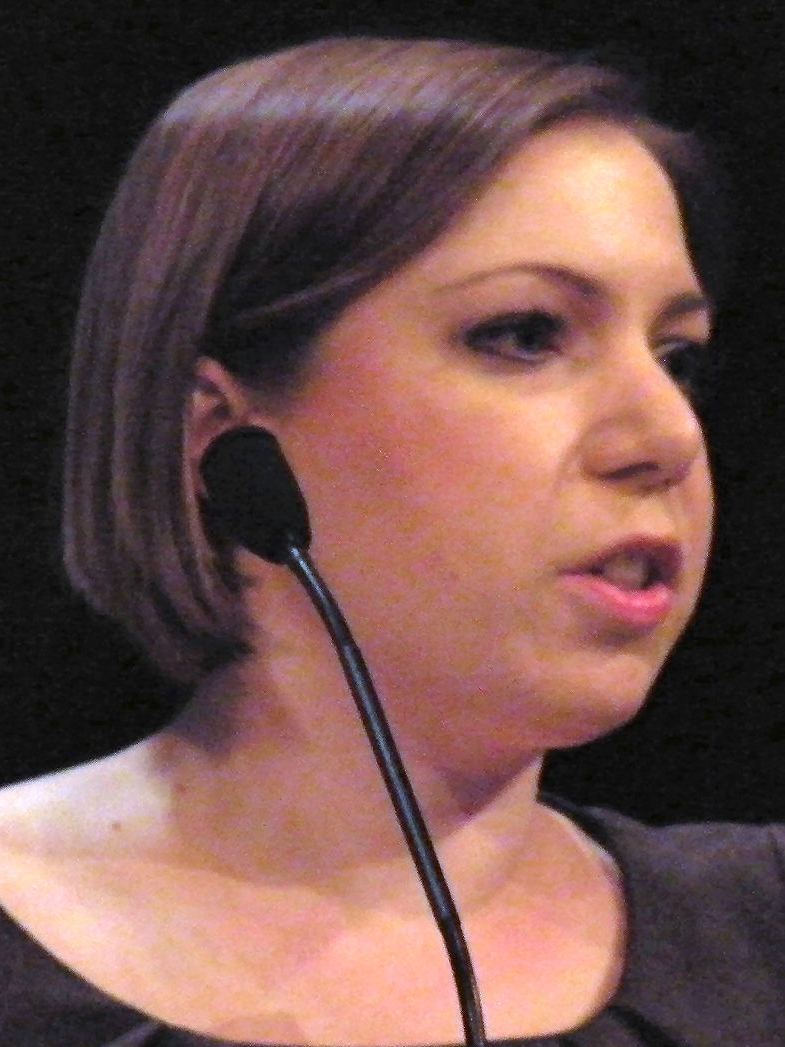

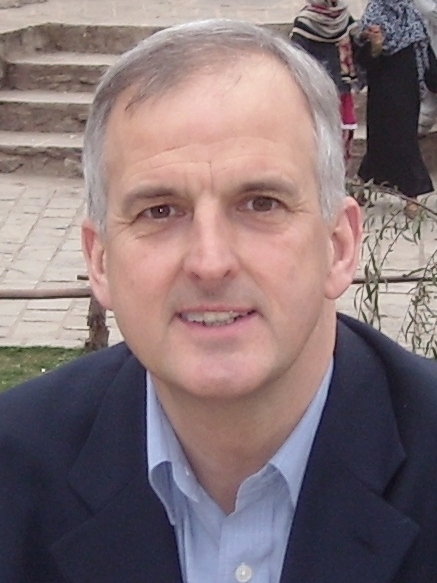
	First party	Second party	Third party
Candidate	Sarah Teather	Robert Evans	Uma Fernandes
Party	Liberal Democrats	Labour	Conservative
Popular vote	8,158	7,040	3,368
Percentage	39.1%	33.8%	16.2%
Swing	▲28.5%	▼29.4%	▼2.0%
MP before election
Paul Daisley
Labour
Subsequent MP
Sarah Teather
Liberal Democrats

A by-election for the United Kingdom parliamentary constituency of Brent East was held on 18 September 2003, following the death of Labour Party MP Paul Daisley on 18 June that year. It was won by the Liberal Democrat candidate Sarah Teather, who gained the seat from Labour with a large swing of 29%.

Commentators linked the result to anger from traditional voters over the Iraq War, as well as to the private sector's involvement in public services. The Liberal Democrats would go on to hold the seat in the 2005 general election.

== Result ==
The turnout was 36.23%. Liberal Democrat candidate Sarah Teather won with 39.12% of the vote, which was a swing of 29% from Labour. This was the largest swing from Labour to a Liberal or Liberal Democrat candidate since the Bermondsey by-election in 1983.

2003 Brent East by-election
Party	Candidate	Votes	%	±%
Liberal Democrats	Sarah Teather	8,158	39.12	+28.5
Labour	Robert Evans	7,040	33.76	–29.4
Conservative	Uma Fernandes	3,368	16.15	–2.0
Green	Noel Lynch	638	3.06	–1.6
Socialist Alliance	Brian Butterworth	361	1.73	New
Public Services Not War	Fawzi Ibrahim	219	1.05	N/A
Independent	Winston McKenzie	197	0.94	New
Independent	Kelly McBride	189	0.91	New
Independent	Harold Immanuel	188	0.9	New
UKIP	(Paul) Brian Hall	140	0.67	+0.1
Socialist Labour	Iris Cremer	111	0.53	–0.8
Independent	Neil Walsh	101	0.48	New
Monster Raving Loony	Alan Hope	59	0.28	New
No description	Aaron Barschak	37	0.18	New
No description	Jitendra Bardwaj	35	0.17	New
www.xat.org	Rainbow George Weiss	11	0.05	New
Majority		1,118	5.36	N/A
Turnout		20,752	36.2	–15.7
Liberal Democrats gain from Labour		Swing	+29.0	

There were 109 spoilt ballots.

== Previous result ==
Labour held the seat with 63.2% of the vote at the 2001 general election. The Liberal Democrats came third in the seat at that time, with only 10.6% of the vote.

General election 2001: Brent East
Party	Candidate	Votes	%	±%
Labour	Paul Daisley	18,325	63.2	–4.1
Conservative	David Gauke	5,278	18.2	–4.1
Liberal Democrats	Norsheen Bhatti	3,065	10.6	+2.8
Green	Simone Aspis	1,361	4.7	New
ProLife Alliance	Sarah Macken	392	1.4	+0.7
Socialist Labour	Iris Cremer	383	1.3	New
UKIP	Ashwin Tanna	188	0.6	New
Majority		13,047	45.0	0.0
Turnout		28,992	51.9	–14.0
Labour hold		Swing	0.0	

== Aftermath ==
Lib Dem leader Charles Kennedy called the result "a big boost for British politics". He said, "We have shown that there is no such thing as a no-go area for the Liberal Democrats. In Britain's most diverse community, we have shown that we can speak for every section of society and the Liberal Democrat message is one they want to hear and support."

In The Independent, psephologist John Curtice stated that "the defeat is not simply a little local difficulty. The finger of blame lies with the [Labour] party nationally. And there are two obvious candidates – Iraq and the domestic agenda." He went on to say that, due to Brent East's substantial Muslim and ethnic minority population, "the war is likely to have been especially unpopular. And there are plenty of Labour MPs whose electoral fortunes depend in part on the votes of Britain's ethnic minority communities."

Labour Party chairman Ian McCartney admitted that the invasion of Iraq had played a major role in the party's defeat. "It is the first time since 1988 that we have lost an election," he said. "It's been unprecedented in modern times, so I am very disappointed, particularly as we had an excellent candidate in Robert Evans and an excellent campaign. The backdrop of the controversy over Iraq in its many forms has caused difficulty in the by-election and generally in getting our message across about the big investment programme we have got in public services, the economy and tackling anti-social behaviour and crime."

The Conservative candidate, Uma Fernandes, was a local councillor. Her daughter Suella Fernandes (now Suella Braveman), a young lawyer who was also on the list of parliamentary candidates, had to be persuaded not to seek the nomination, and in the event campaigned for her mother. In 2015, Suella Fernandes was elected for Fareham.

== See also ==
- Lists of United Kingdom by-elections
