= 2016 Tooting by-election =

UK parliamentary by-election

- 16 June 2016

Tooting constituency
- Registered: 74,701
- Turnout: 42.9%
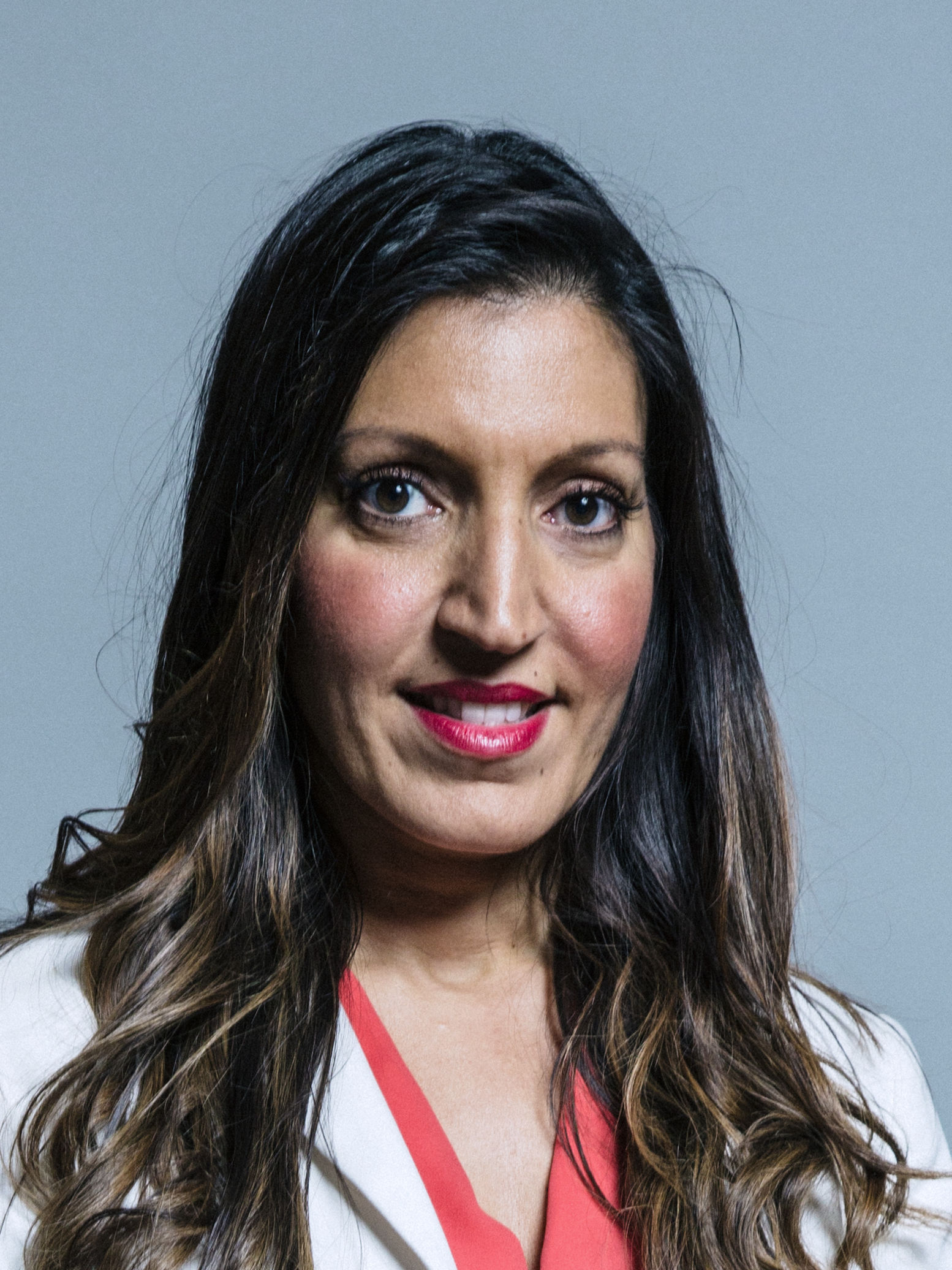
	First party	Second party
Candidate	Rosena Allin-Khan	Dan Watkins
Party	Labour	Conservative
Popular vote	17,894	11,537
Percentage	55.9%	36.1%
Swing	▲8.7pp	▼5.8pp
MP before election
Sadiq Khan
Labour
Elected MP
Rosena Allin-Khan
Labour

A by-election for the United Kingdom parliamentary constituency of Tooting was held on 16 June 2016, triggered by the resignation of incumbent Labour Party Member of Parliament (MP) Sadiq Khan upon his election as Mayor of London. It was won by Rosena Allin-Khan of Labour, who held the seat with an increased majority for the party.

== Candidates ==
Sitting MP Sadiq Khan was elected Mayor of London on 5 May 2016; as a result, he resigned his parliamentary seat on 9 May by appointment to the ancient office of Crown Steward and Bailiff of The Three Chiltern Hundreds, a customary practice in the UK which enables MPs to resign.

Rosena Allin-Khan, an accident and emergency doctor and deputy leader of the Labour group on Wandsworth Council, was the Labour candidate.

Dan Watkins was the Conservative Party's candidate. He was the 2015 candidate and the party's spokesman for Tooting and a local campaigner for issues including for a local station on the planned Crossrail 2 railway.

Esther Obiri-Darko was the Green Party's candidate. She also stood at the 2015 election.

Alex Glassbrook, a local barrister and volunteer lawyer, was the candidate for the Liberal Democrats.

Elizabeth Jones, who had recently stood in the London Assembly election, stood for the UK Independence Party (UKIP).

Des Coke stood for the Christian Peoples Alliance.

Howling Laud Hope was the candidate of the Monster Raving Loony Party.

There were three independent candidates: Zirwa Javaid, Zia Samadani and Smiley Smillie. Ankit Love, who was a candidate in the London mayoral election, stood for One Love Party. Akbar Ali Malik stood under the banner of the Immigrants Political Party. Graham Moore stood for the English Democrats. Bobby Smith, leader of Give Me Back Elmo and perennial election candidate, stood for his party.

Former MP George Galloway had floated the idea of standing after his candidacy in the London mayoral election, but withdrew, citing fears of splitting the Labour vote and thus allowing the Conservatives to win.

== Result ==
A two minute silence was held during the count, to commemorate Jo Cox, the MP for Batley and Spen, who was assassinated on the day of the by-election.

Tooting by-election 2016
Party	Candidate	Votes	%	±%
Labour	Rosena Allin-Khan	17,894	55.9	+8.7
Conservative	Dan Watkins	11,537	36.1	–5.8
Green	Esther Obiri-Darko	830	2.6	–1.5
Liberal Democrats	Alex Glassbrook	820	2.6	–1.4
UKIP	Elizabeth Jones	507	1.6	–1.3
CPA	Des Coke	164	0.5	New
Monster Raving Loony	Alan "Howling Laud" Hope	54	0.2	New
English Democrat	Graham Moore	50	0.2	New
Immigrants Political Party	Akbar Ali Malik	44	0.1	New
One Love	Ankit Love	32	0.1	New
Independent	Zirwa Javaid	30	0.1	New
Independent	Zia Samadani	23	0.1	New
Give Me Back Elmo	Bobby Smith	9	0.0	New
Independent	Smiley Smillie	5	0.0	New
Majority		6,357	19.8	+14.5
Turnout		32,048	42.5	–27.2
Registered electors		74,701		
Labour hold		Swing	+7.3	

== Previous result ==
General election 2015: Tooting
Party	Candidate	Votes	%	±%
Labour	Sadiq Khan	25,263	47.2	+3.7
Conservative	Dan Watkins	22,421	41.9	+3.4
Green	Esther Obiri-Darko	2,201	4.1	+2.9
Liberal Democrats	Philip Ling	2,107	3.9	–10.9
UKIP	Przemek Skwirczyński	1,537	2.9	+1.6
Majority		2,842	5.3	+0.3
Turnout		53,529	69.7	+1.1
Registered electors		76,782		
Labour hold		Swing	+0.1	

== See also ==
- List of United Kingdom by-elections (2010–present)
