= Rosena Allin-Khan =

British politician (born 1978)

Rosena Allin-Khan MP
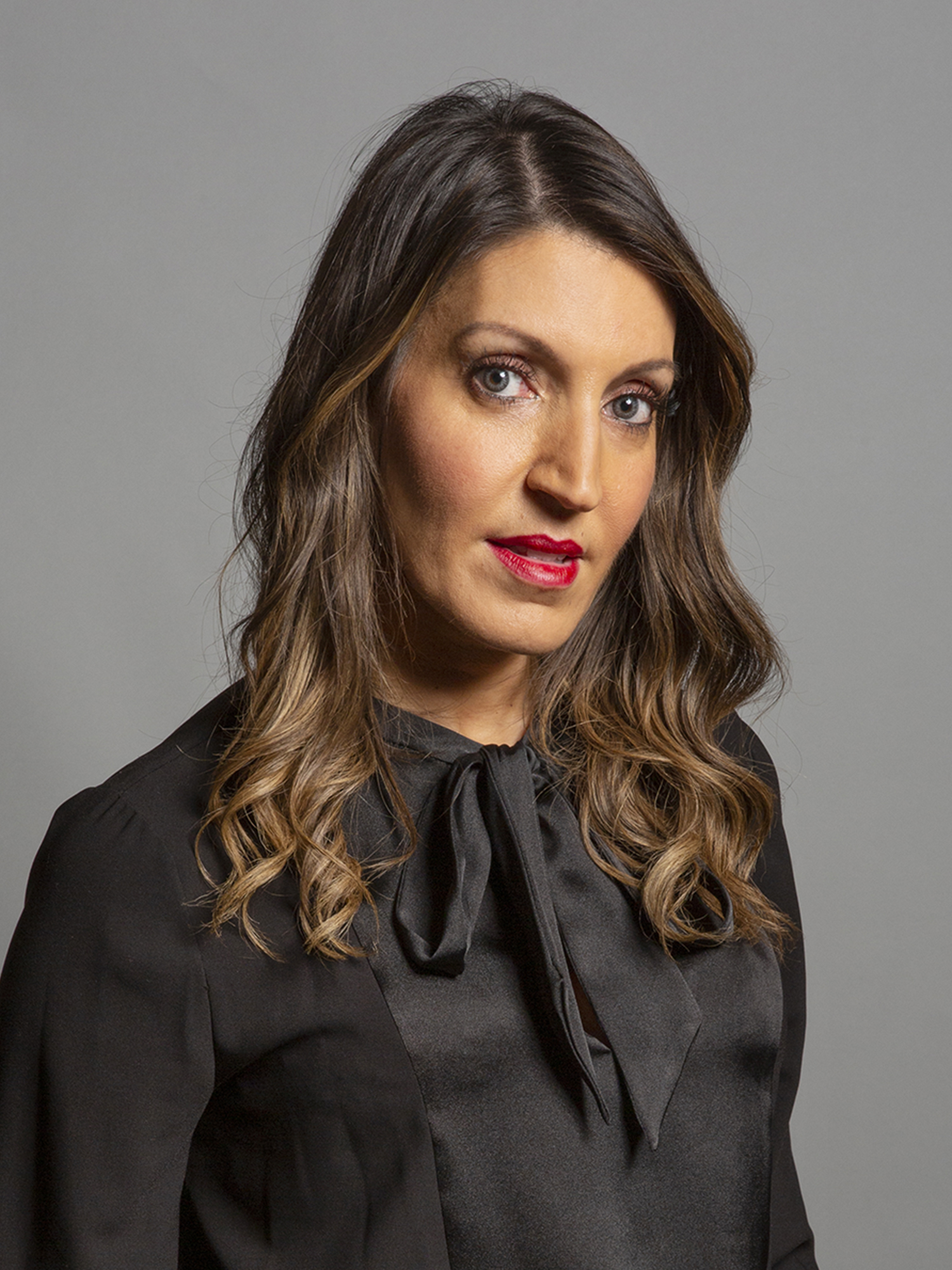
- Official portrait, 2019

Member of Parliament for Tooting
- Incumbent
- Assumed office 16 June 2016
- Preceded by: Sadiq Khan
- Majority: 19,487 (36.8%)
Shadow portfolios
Shadow Cabinet
2020–2023	Mental Health
Shadow Frontbench
2016–2020	Sport

Member of Wandsworth Council for Bedford
- In office 22 May 2014 – 3 May 2018

Personal details
- Born: Rosena Chantelle Allin-Khan; 10 May 1978 (age 48) Tooting, London, England
- Party: Labour
- Children: 2
- Education: Brunel University (BSc); Lucy Cavendish College, Cambridge (MB BChir)
- Website: drrosena.co.uk

Rosena Chantelle Allin-Khan (born 10 May 1978) is a British politician and medical doctor serving as Member of Parliament (MP) for Tooting since 2016. A member of the Labour Party, she attended shadow cabinet as Shadow Minister for Mental Health from 2020 to 2023.

She stood as a candidate at the 2020 Labour Party deputy leadership election, finishing in second-place after three rounds of voting. She was previously Shadow Minister for Sport between October 2016 and January 2020.

== Early life and education ==
Rosena Chantelle Allin-Khan was born in Tooting. Her parents were both musicians: her Polish mother had been a singer in the Polish girl group Filipinki, and met her father, originally from Pakistan, while the band was on tour in London. After having two children together, the couple separated. Rosena's mother worked at three jobs to support Rosena and her brother.

Allin-Khan was educated at Trinity St Mary's Primary School, Balham, followed by The Grey Coat Hospital. But her disappointing A-level grades, two Es and a U, dashed her hopes of being accepted to study medicine. Instead, she studied medical biochemistry at Brunel University, funding her education through a series of part-time jobs and establishing a strong record. She was accepted to study medicine at Lucy Cavendish College, Cambridge, where she was assisted by scholarships.

== Medical career ==
After qualifying as a doctor, Allin-Khan worked at the Royal London and Homerton Hospitals. She also completed a Master's degree in public health. Following this, she worked as a humanitarian aid doctor in the Gaza Strip, Israel, Sub-Saharan Africa, and broader Asia.

Prior to her election to the House of Commons, she worked as a junior doctor in the accident and emergency department at St George's Hospital in Tooting. In addition to her parliamentary work, Allin-Khan continues to work occasional shifts at St George's Hospital during parliamentary recesses.

== Political career ==
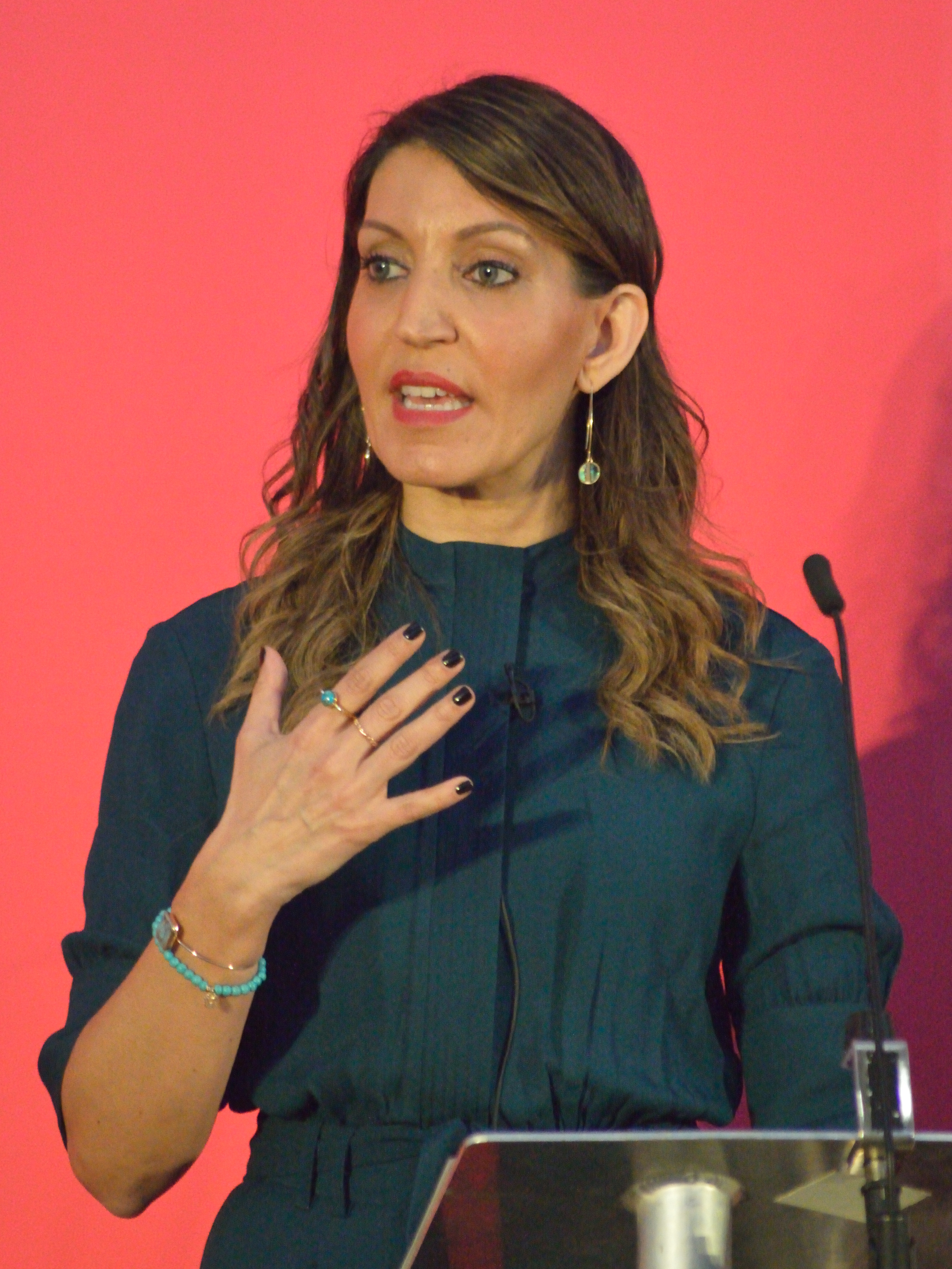
Allin-Khan speaking at a hustings during the deputy leadership campaign in February 2020

Allin-Khan's work in public health also led her to become active in local politics. She was elected as a councillor on Wandsworth Council for Bedford Ward in Balham, serving from 2014 to 2018. She served as deputy leader of the council's Labour group.

Allin-Khan was selected as the Labour Party candidate for the Tooting constituency, after the seat became vacant in May 2016; the sitting MP, Sadiq Khan (no relation), had resigned after he had won that year's London mayoral election.

Allin-Khan's by-election campaign emphasised her local, working class roots and Polish-Pakistani ancestry. When the election results were announced, Allin-Khan read a tribute to Jo Cox, the Labour MP for Batley and Spen who was murdered on the day of the by-election.

She campaigned to remain in the EU during the 2016 Brexit referendum, and later campaigned with the same position for a second referendum on the issue.

In October 2016, Allin-Khan was appointed Shadow Minister for Sport. While in this position, she pledged to introduce safe standing at football matches in the UK from the 2020/21 season, if Labour won the next election. She further campaigned to have England's semi-final match against Croatia during the 2018 World Cup to be shown on big screens in public. She said that the St George's Flag had become associated with the far-right, and was pleased that the success of England in the World Cup had helped reclaim the flag for the wider population.

Allin-Khan retained her seat in the 2017 general election and the 2019 general elections. She received a higher number of votes in the first of these elections, strengthening her position, but falling back slightly in the 2019 election.

Allin-Khan stood as a candidate in the 2020 Labour Party deputy leadership election. During the campaign, she said that she would be a unifying candidate, and highlighted her working-class background, and experience as a doctor. She received 77,351 (16.8%) of first preference votes, and 113,858 (26.1%) in the final round, coming second to Angela Rayner.

She was appointed as Shadow Minister for Mental Health in Keir Starmer's first shadow cabinet, shadowing Nadine Dorries. At the start of the coronavirus pandemic in the UK, Allin-Khan has been working 12-hour shifts at St George's Hospital in Tooting, in addition to her job as an MP and a shadow minister.

She called for more mental health support to NHS staff during the pandemic, noting that there was a "rise in suicides, self-harm and suicidal ideation among frontline NHS and care staff" due to "a lack of PPE, an increased workload ... and witnessing more patients die". She also criticised the UK Government for being too slow in acting, saying that it should have sooner introduced measures such as the lockdown and widespread testing.

In October 2020, the Parliamentary Commissioner for Standards rebuked Allin-Khan for breaching the Code of Conduct for Members of Parliament. As this was Allin-Khan's third breach of the rules, the matter was referred to the Parliamentary Committee on Standards.

In the May 2021 British shadow cabinet reshuffle, she was made a Shadow Secretary of State, which was changed to Shadow Cabinet Minister in November 2021.

Allin-Khan resigned from the Starmer shadow cabinet on 4 September 2023, criticising Shadow Health Secretary Wes Streeting's advocacy for outsourcing the National Health Service (NHS) to the private sector. She also said that Starmer did "not see a space for a mental health portfolio in a Labour cabinet".

At the 2024 general election, Allin-Khan was elected with an increased majority of 19,497, receiving 55.2% of the total vote share as well as the greatest number of votes of any Labour MP in the country.

== Personal life ==
Allin-Khan is married and lives in Tooting with her husband, who is Welsh. She is a Muslim. The couple have two daughters.

She is an amateur boxer, training at Balham Boxing Club. Allin-Khan also serves as the team doctor.

Parliament of the United Kingdom
Preceded by Sadiq Khan	Member of Parliament for Tooting; 2016–present	Incumbent
