= Minister for Young Citizens and Youth Engagement =

Defunct United Kingdom ministerial office

- Incumbent; Vacant
- Appointer: Prime Minister
- Formation: 30 October 2009
- First holder: Dawn Butler
- Final holder: Duties transferred to Minister for Civil Society

The post of Minister for Young Citizens and Youth Engagement was a ministerial position in the United Kingdom, created on 30 October 2009 by prime minister Gordon Brown. It was created following a recommendation that came from the Youth Citizenship Commission that there should be a Minister for Youth Citizenship. The first Minister for Youth was Dawn Butler, who served as a member of parliament and as the honorary vice president of the British Youth Council.

The minister's role is to coordinate government work to help young people engage with politics which will involve working with ministers in relevant Government departments including the Department for Children, Schools and Families (DCSF) and the Ministry of Justice (MoJ) and other relevant bodies in order to lead the Government's response to the Youth Citizenship Commission, to be published before the end of the year, take forward appropriate action arising from the recommendations of the Youth Citizenship Commission report published yearly, and seek ways to help increase young people's participation in their local communities as well as in local and national politics. Following the 2010 general election, David Cameron transferred the duties of the Minister for Youth to the Minister for Civil Society, Nick Hurd.

== List of ministers for young citizens and youth engagement ==
Portrait	Name Constituency	Term of office		Political party	Prime Minister
	Dawn Butler; MP for Brent South	30 October 2009	11 May 2010	Labour	Gordon Brown
