= Brent Central =

UK Parliament constituency (2010–2024)

Coordinates: 51.55°N 0.25°W

- Former borough constituency for the House of Commons
- Boundary of Brent Central in Greater London
- County: Greater London
- Population: 137,438 (2011 census)
- Electorate: 80,499 (June 2017)
- Major settlements: Willesden, Harlesden, Dollis Hill, Neasden, Kingsbury Green (part), Park Royal, Tokyngton

2010–2024
- Seats: One
- Created from: Brent East, Brent South, Brent North
- Replaced by: Brent East, Brent West, Queen's Park and Maida Vale

Brent Central was a constituency (Note: A borough constituency (for the purposes of election expenses and type of returning officer)) in Greater London, represented in the House of Commons of the UK Parliament by Dawn Butler of the Labour Party from 2015 until its abolition for the 2024 general election. (Note: As with all constituencies, the constituency elects one Member of Parliament (MP) by the first past the post system of election at least every five years.)

Under the 2023 Periodic Review of Westminster constituencies, the majority of the constituency was incorporated into the re-established seat of Brent East, with some areas being included in the new constituencies of Brent West and Queen's Park and Maida Vale.

== History ==
The seat was created in the London review of seats of the Boundary Commission before the 2010 general election from parts of predecessors Brent East, Brent South and Brent North – the first two of which no longer exist.

Sarah Teather was the constituency's first MP until 2015, when she stood down; she had previously represented the old Brent East constituency since a 2003 by-election. Dawn Butler, previously Labour MP for Brent South lost to Teather in 2010 and gained the seat in 2015 with a majority of over 40% over the Conservative candidate, whilst the Liberal Democrat share of the vote fell by 35.8%, the sharpest fall in the party's vote share in that election.

== Constituency profile ==
The Brent Central constituency formed the central portion of the London Borough of Brent. Since the early 1990s the Conservative party has had a small minority of councillors but been without wards in the constituency; a plurality of the voters in each ward have been in favour of the Labour Party and/or the Liberal Democrats. It is mostly in the postal district of NW10, but also partly falls under NW2, NW9 and HA9.

=== Districts and ethnicity ===
Kensal Green lay at the southeast of the constituency, neighbouring Stonebridge and Harlesden, which have a high concentration of black residents and severe deprivation. The southwest corner is dominated by the Park Royal industrial estate, the largest in Europe. To the west is the 21st century-built Wembley Stadium; the north takes in Dollis Hill including part of the Welsh Harp Reservoir. Other than Harlesden and Stonebridge, pockets prominent in the Index of Multiple Deprivation are in smallest areas (Output Areas of censuses) within Willesden Green and Neasden, which has Britain's largest Hindu temple. Although there is a mixed income established Asian minority, the proportion of the borough's residents who describe themselves as being of Asian ethnicity is the fourth-highest in London, the highest proportion of Asian backgrounds being the London Borough of Newham. The proportion of social housing and rented housing is close to the average of Greater London; this increased by 66% in the ten years to 2011 to 30%.

== Boundaries ==
Map of boundaries 2010-2024

Brent Central was made up of nine electoral wards from the London Borough of Brent:

- Dollis Hill, Dudden Hill, Harlesden, Kensal Green, Mapesbury, Stonebridge, Tokyngton, Welsh Harp, Willesden Green.

=== Boundary review ===
Under its 2007 review of parliamentary representation in North London, the Boundary Commission for England reduced Brent and Camden's constituencies from five to four. To create the new Brent Central constituency, Dollis Hill ward, Dudden Hill ward, Mapesbury ward, and parts of Welsh Harp ward, Willesden Green ward, Kensal Green ward, and Stonebridge ward were taken from the former Brent East constituency; Harlesden ward. Parts of Stonebridge ward, Willesden Green ward, Kensal Green ward, Tokyngton ward, and Welsh Harp ward were taken from the former Brent South constituency; and part of Welsh Harp ward was taken from the reconstituted Brent North constituency.

== Members of Parliament ==
Election	Member	Party
2010	Sarah Teather	Liberal Democrat
2015	Dawn Butler	Labour

== Elections ==
=== Elections in the 2010s ===
General election 2019: Brent Central
Party	Candidate	Votes	%	±%
Labour	Dawn Butler	31,779	64.7	−8.4
Conservative	David Brescia	10,909	22.2	+2.7
Liberal Democrats	Deborah Unger	4,844	9.9	+5.0
Green	William Relton	1,600	3.3	+1.7
Majority		20,870	42.5	−11.1
Turnout		49,132	58.3	−6.6
Labour hold		Swing	–5.5	

General election 2017: Brent Central
Party	Candidate	Votes	%	±%
Labour	Dawn Butler	38,208	73.1	+10.9
Conservative	Rahoul Bhansali	10,211	19.5	−0.8
Liberal Democrats	Anton Georgiou	2,519	4.8	−3.6
Green	Shaka Lish	802	1.5	−2.6
UKIP	Janice North	556	1.1	−2.9
Majority		27,997	53.5	+11.8
Turnout		52,296	65.0	+3.9
Registered electors		80,499		
Labour hold		Swing	+5.85	

General election 2015: Brent Central
Party	Candidate	Votes	%	±%
Labour	Dawn Butler	29,216	62.1	+20.9
Conservative	Alan Mendoza	9,567	20.3	+9.1
Liberal Democrats	Lauren Keith	3,937	8.4	−35.8
Green	Shahrar Ali	1,912	4.1	+2.6
UKIP	Stephen Priestley	1,850	3.9	N/A
TUSC	John Boyle	235	0.5	N/A
Communities United	Kamran Malik	170	0.4	N/A
Independent	Noel Coonan	145	0.3	N/A
Majority		19,649	41.8	N/A
Turnout		47,032	61.1	−0.1
Registered electors		77,038		
Labour gain from Liberal Democrats		Swing	-28.3	

General election 2010: Brent Central
Party	Candidate	Votes	%	±%
Liberal Democrats	Sarah Teather*	20,026	44.2	+13.1
Labour	Dawn Butler**	18,681	41.2	−8.9
Conservative	Sachin Rajput	5,068	11.2	−1.9
Green	Shahrar Ali	668	1.5	−2.2
Christian	Errol Williams	488	1.1	N/A
Respect	Abdi Duale	230	0.5	N/A
Independent	Dean McCastree	163	0.4	N/A
Majority		1,345	3.0	N/A
Turnout		45,324	61.2	+5.7
Registered electors		74,046		
Liberal Democrats win (new seat)				

* Served as MP for Brent East in the 2005–2010 Parliament
** Served as MP for Brent South in the 2005–2010 Parliament

== See also ==
- List of parliamentary constituencies in London
