= 2020 Labour Party leadership election (UK) =

Election to replace Jeremy Corbyn

- 24 February – 4 April 2020
- Turnout: 490,731 (62.58%) ▼15.1 pp
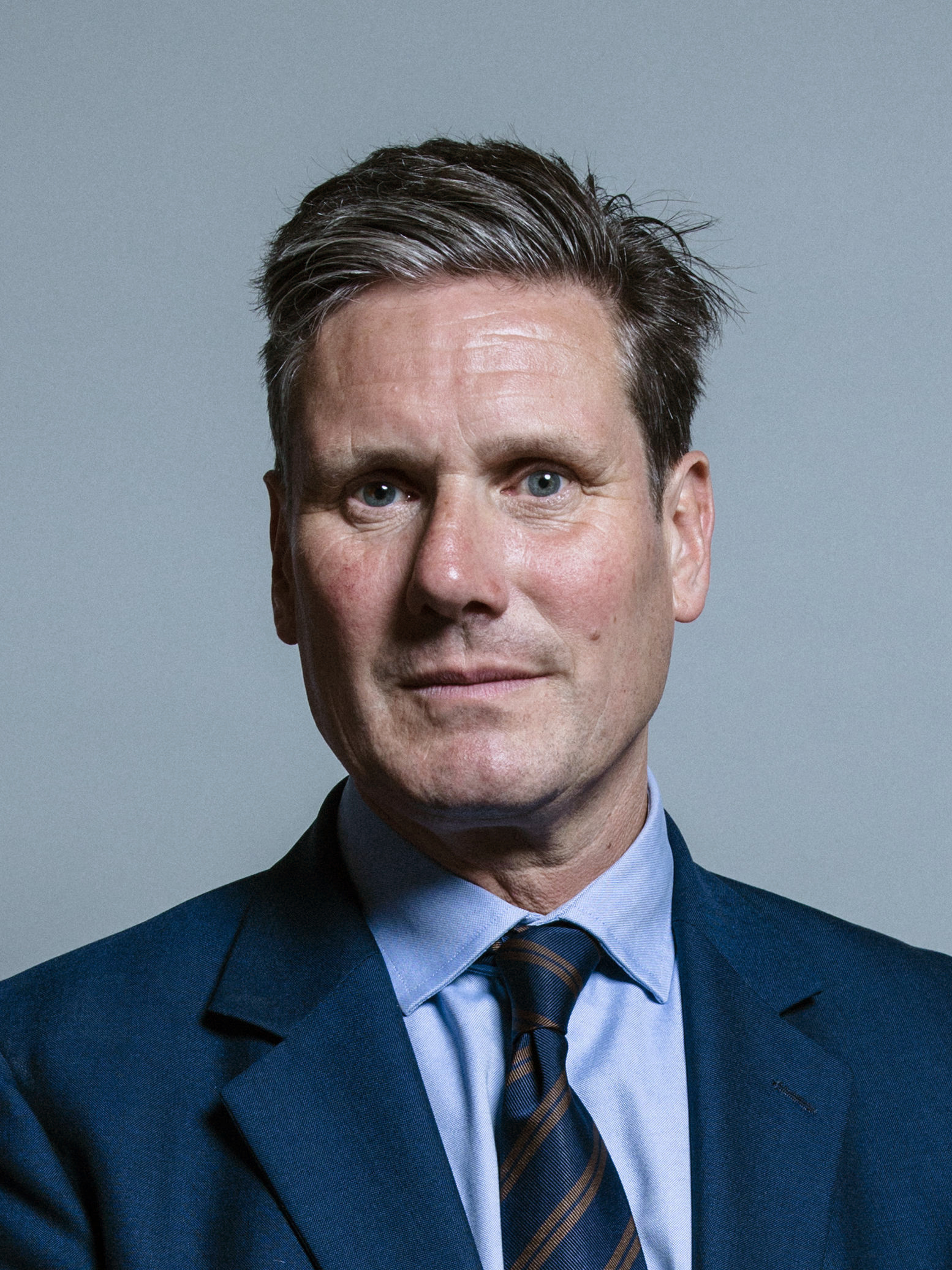

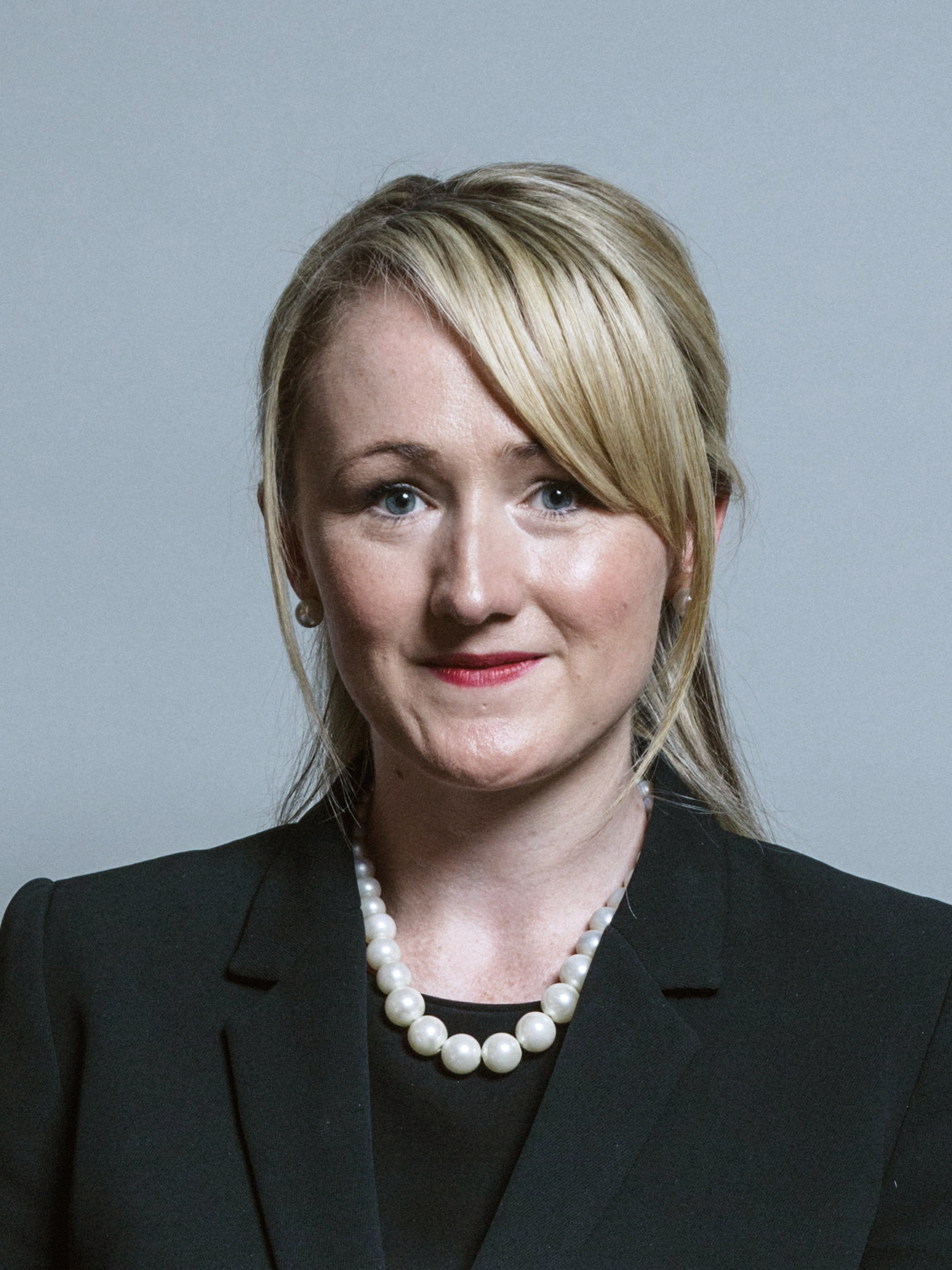

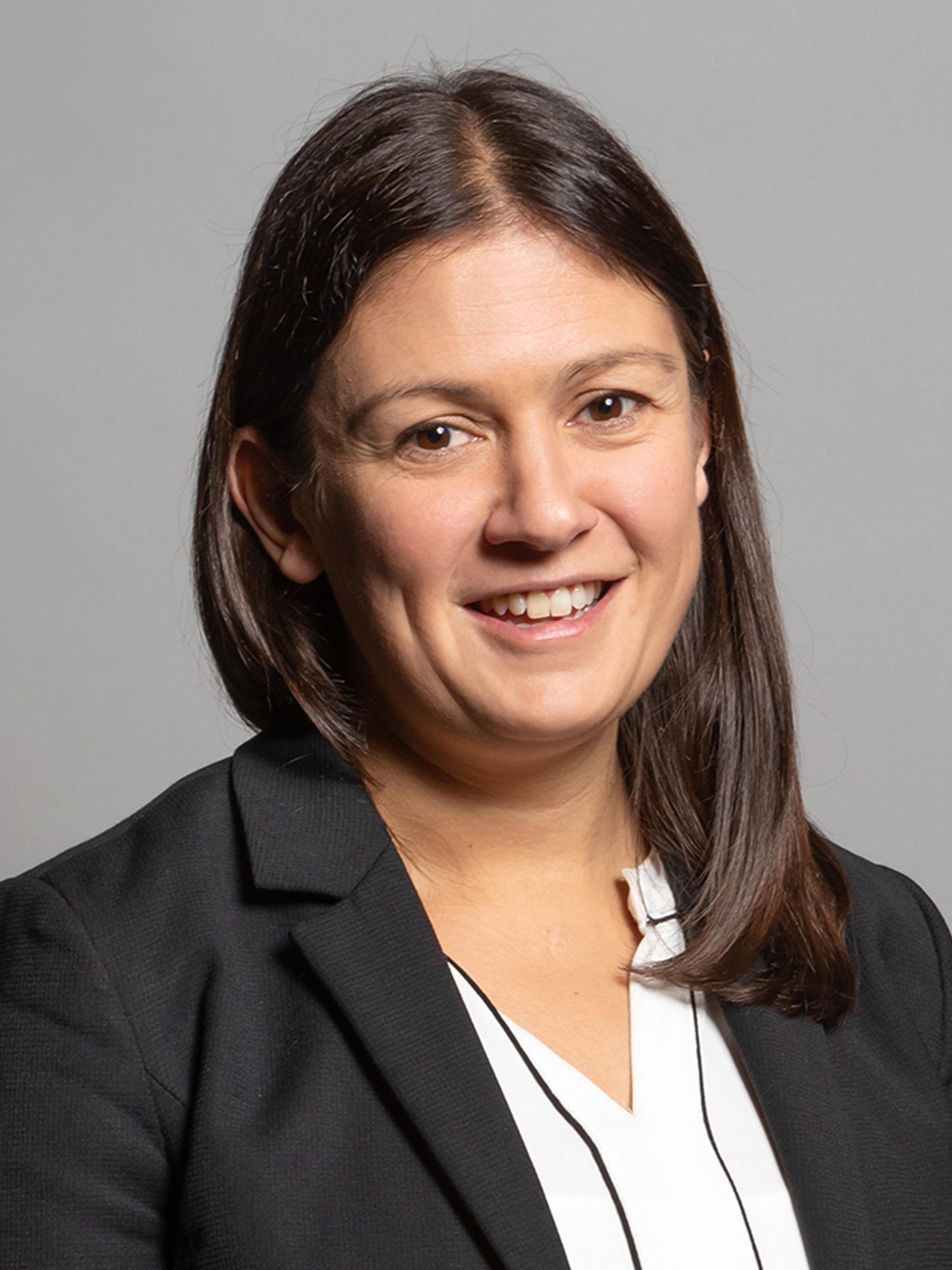
Candidate	Keir Starmer	Rebecca Long-Bailey	Lisa Nandy
Popular vote	275,780	135,218	79,597
Percentage	56.2%	27.6%	16.2%
Leader before election
Jeremy Corbyn
Elected Leader
Keir Starmer

The 2020 Labour Party leadership election was triggered after Jeremy Corbyn announced his intention to resign as the leader of the Labour Party following the party's defeat at the 2019 general election. It was won by Sir Keir Starmer, who received 56.2 per cent of the vote on the first round and went on to become Prime Minister after winning the 2024 general election. It was held alongside the deputy leadership election, in which Angela Rayner was elected to succeed Tom Watson as deputy leader after Watson retired from Parliament in November 2019, in advance of the election.

== Background ==
Jeremy Corbyn was elected Labour Party leader in a 2015 leadership election, succeeding Ed Miliband after he resigned following the party's defeat at the general election that year, and re-elected leader in 2016 following a challenge from Owen Smith. While Labour gained 30 seats in the 2017 general election, it lost 60 seats in the 2019 election, resulting in the party having its fewest seats in the House of Commons since 1935.

Former Labour Prime Minister Tony Blair said that Corbyn's Brexit policy "alienated both sides of the debate" and that he personified "a brand of quasi-revolutionary socialism — mixing far-left economic policy with deep hostility to Western foreign policy". Blair also highlighted the handling of antisemitism in the party as a key issue. Political scientist John Curtice said that "the bond between Labour and its traditional working-class base is now badly strained" after a substantial swing of votes from Labour to the Conservatives in leave-voting areas.

Corbyn took responsibility for the defeat but said he remained proud of his party's campaign. In The Observer, Corbyn claimed that Labour's election campaign had successfully re-set the terms of debate and his manifesto would be seen as "historically important". Corbyn's Shadow Chancellor and ally John McDonnell also took responsibility for the defeat but also cited the media's portrayal of Corbyn as a factor in the defeat. Corbyn subsequently announced that he would resign as Labour Party leader following a "process of reflection".

== Procedure ==
The election was conducted under a pure one member, one vote (OMOV) system, using the instant-runoff voting electoral system with preferential balloting to calculate the result. Votes were cast using postal ballots and online voting forms. Candidates were elected by members and registered and affiliated supporters, who all received a maximum of one vote, and all votes were weighted equally. This meant that, for example, members of Labour-affiliated trades unions needed to register as affiliated Labour supporters to vote. Members who joined before 20 January were eligible to vote.

To stand, candidates needed to be nominated by at least 10 per cent of the combined membership of the Parliamentary Labour Party (PLP) and European Parliamentary Labour Party (EPLP), meaning 22 MPs and MEPs at the time. As a result, a maximum of nine candidates could stand. They also needed to be nominated by at least 5 per cent of Constituency Labour Parties (CLPs), meaning at least 33 CLPs, or at least three party affiliates that consist of at least 5 per cent of affiliate members including at least two trades unions. Affiliates consist of affiliated trades unions and socialist societies.

The timetable for the election was set by the party's National Executive Committee (NEC) on 6 January 2020.

Nominations from the Parliamentary Labour Party and European Parliamentary Labour Party opened on 7 January and closed on 13 January. Between 15 January and 15 February, constituency parties and affiliate organisations could nominate their preferred candidate. Applications to become a registered supporter opened on 14 January and closed on 16 January. Voting in the membership ballot opened on 24 February and closed at midday on 2 April. The result of the leadership election was announced on 4 April. The special conference planned for the announcement of the election result was "scaled-back" on 12 March because of the COVID-19 pandemic.

== Campaign ==
=== Announcements ===
Immediately following the 2019 general election, Keir Starmer, the Shadow Secretary of State for Exiting the European Union, was considered favourite to win the leadership election by the online gambling company Betfair. Rebecca Long-Bailey, the shadow business secretary, was considered another front runner. Various other figures were considered as possible leadership candidates, including Lisa Nandy, the MP for Wigan, who said on 15 December 2019 that she was "seriously thinking" about standing for the leadership. On 29 December, Long-Bailey wrote an article for The Guardian declaring her interest in standing and laying out her strategy for a "progressive patriotism".

Some party figures, including the former MP Caroline Flint and the MP Wes Streeting, argued for a "clean break" from the previous leadership. However, Len McCluskey, general secretary of Unite the Union, said that the next leader should "carry on the tradition", describing Long-Bailey and Angela Rayner as his preferred candidates. Party figures affiliated with Long-Bailey and MPs such as Corbyn, as well as centrist figures like Alastair Campbell, encouraged supporters of their preferred candidates to join the party to vote in the leadership election. Roy Hattersley, a former deputy leader of the party, wrote on 21 December that MPs should refuse to accept Long-Bailey if she were elected leader.

The shadow foreign secretary, Emily Thornberry, was the first to announce, on 18 December, that she was standing for the leadership. She laid out her pitch in an article for The Guardian. She said that her first priority would be to deal with antisemitism in the party by implementing recommendations from the Board of Deputies of British Jews, the Jewish Labour Movement and the Equality and Human Rights Commission. She criticised Corbyn's senior advisers for overruling her as the shadow foreign secretary and for their strategic decisions in the 2019 general election.

Clive Lewis, the shadow minister for sustainable economics, announced on 19 December that he would stand. He said that as leader, he would give more democratic power in the party to its members. He argued that the party should work more with other political parties on the left, and proposed constitutional reforms including supporting proportional representation and reform of the House of Lords. In January 2020, he proposed a referendum about the future of the British royal family. He was criticised for his response to claims against him of sexual harassment, for which he had been cleared by a disciplinary body within Labour, which "seemed unapologetic".

Jess Phillips announced her candidacy in Grimsby on 3 January 2020. She criticised the party's approach to Brexit and Scottish independence, saying that she was opposed to a second referendum on Scottish independence. She said that she would be open to arguing for the UK to rejoin the European Union. Criticising the party's manifesto at the 2019 general election, Phillips said that she would support nationalising railways but would not prioritise further nationalisation.

Nandy announced that she would stand in a letter to the Wigan Post on the same day as Phillips. She argued that the party needed a "bridge" to join areas in northern England where the party was losing seats and metropolitan areas where the party was gaining support.

Starmer, who a poll had indicated was the most popular potential candidate heading into the leadership election, announced his candidacy with a video posted to social media on 4 January followed by a launch in Stevenage.

Long-Bailey announced that she would stand in an article for Tribune magazine on 6 January. Long-Bailey was seen by many observers and party colleagues as the continuity candidate, who would have continued to take the party in the same direction as Corbyn. While she disputed the description, her campaign stressed ideological continuity with Corbyn. She attracted attention for rating Corbyn "ten out of ten" as a politician, and called for constitutional reform to spread power more evenly across the country, including abolishing the House of Lords.

=== Nominations stage ===
Parliamentary

Candidates first needed to receive nominations from at least 5 per cent of the party's MPs and MEPs to progress to the second round of nominations. Starmer won the support of enough MPs and MEPs to progress to the next round of nominations on 8 January, when he was also endorsed by the trade union Unison. The following day, Long-Bailey, Nandy and Phillips gained enough MP and MEP nominations to progress.

The deadline for PLP and EPLP nominations was 2.30 pm on 13 January. Lewis, with only five nominations including himself, withdrew from the contest shortly before the deadline. Thornberry was also short of the required nominations at the beginning of the day, but managed to obtain enough to qualify less than ten minutes before the deadline, helped by MPs who had formerly nominated Lewis. After the close of nominations, the party announced that Long-Bailey, Nandy, Phillips, Starmer and Thornberry would proceed to the next stage of the election. Starmer received 88 nominations, more than any other candidate, followed by Long-Bailey with 33 and Nandy with 31. Phillips and Thornberry were each nominated by 23 MPs and MEPs, one more than the minimum requirement of 22. Shortly after these nominations were published, Starmer was heavily favoured in the betting odds.

Constituencies and affiliates

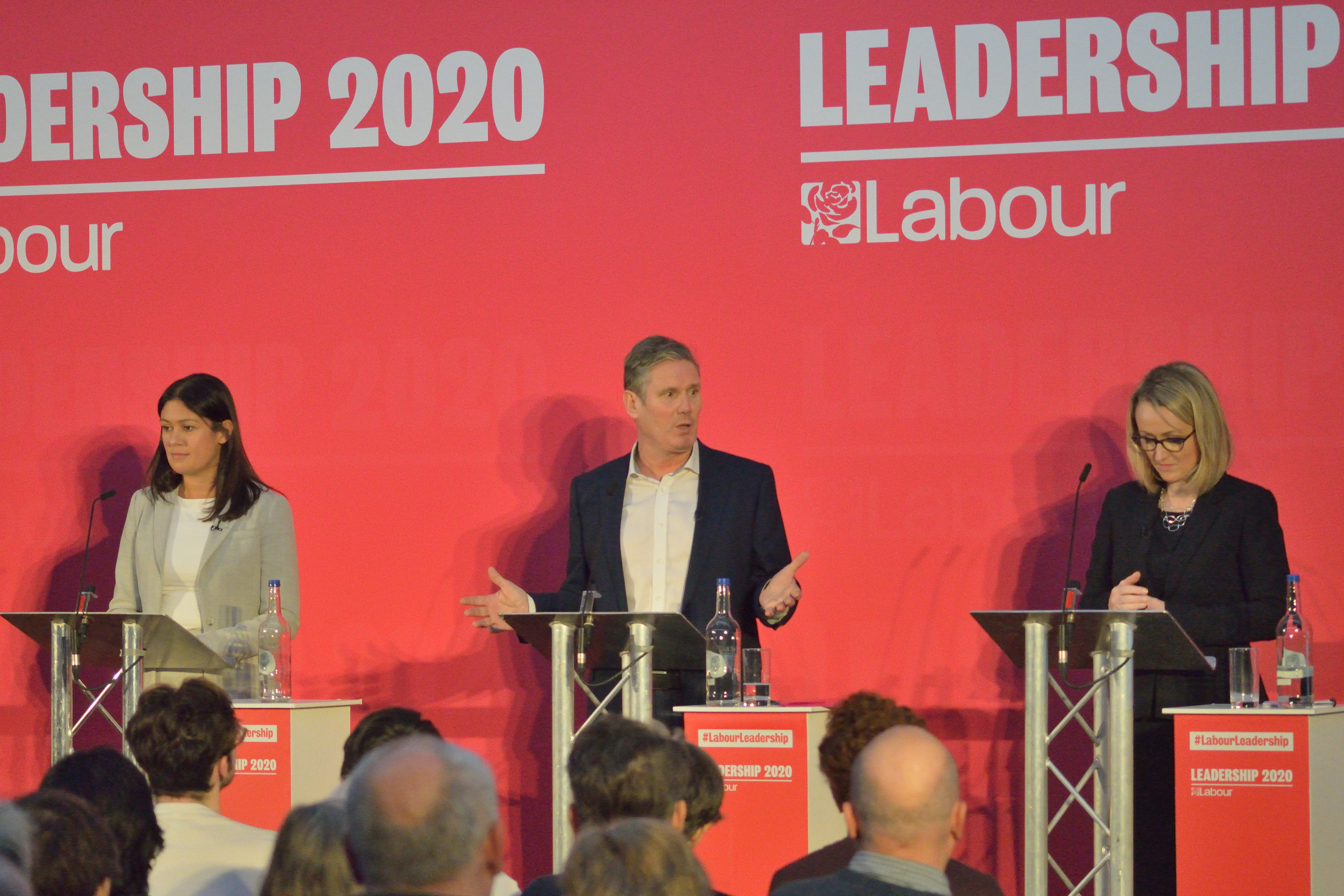
Nandy, Starmer and Long-Bailey at the Bristol hustings on 1 February 2020

Corbyn-supporting group Momentum balloted its members on a proposal that the group endorse Long-Bailey (alongside Angela Rayner for deputy). Of the 7,395 respondents 70 per cent backed Long-Bailey, but the organisation was criticised by commentators and by some Momentum members for not giving the option to endorse other candidates.

Starmer became the first candidate to qualify for the ballot on 20 January with his third affiliate nomination, from the Union of Shop, Distributive and Allied Workers; by that point, he was also leading in nominations from Constituency Labour Parties (CLPs). Phillips withdrew from the election on 21 January, saying that she was unable to unite the party. Nandy became the second candidate to qualify for the ballot on 22 January, having received backing from the GMB and National Union of Mineworkers unions and the Chinese for Labour socialist society. Long-Bailey was the third candidate to qualify, following further trade union support.

However, Thornberry failed to achieve enough nominations, falling just short of the required number of constituency party nominations and being eliminated on 15 February 2020.

Reported data breach

The Labour Party reported an alleged breach of data protection rules by Starmer's campaign to the Information Commissioner's Office in early February, which it said was in accord with the statutory obligation to report suspected data breaches. The campaign described the complaint as "nonsense". The Starmer campaign chair suggested that the allegations were a result of the Starmer team alerting party officials the week before to a possible data breach by Long-Bailey's campaign, though there was no evidence that this occurred.

=== Membership ballot ===
The first public hustings to feature the final three candidates was held in Glasgow, Scotland on 15 February.

== Candidates ==
To qualify for the ballot, candidates needed nominations from 10 per cent (22) of the party's Members of Parliament (MPs) and Members of European Parliament (MEPs), followed by support from either 5 per cent (33) of Constituency Labour Parties (CLPs), or from at least three affiliated groups, including two trade unions and representing at least 5 per cent of affiliated members. Five candidates (Rebecca Long-Bailey, Lisa Nandy, Jess Phillips, Keir Starmer and Emily Thornberry) received sufficient nominations to proceed to the second round of nominations. Starmer had the most nominations from MPs and MEPs at 88, followed by Long-Bailey and Nandy with 33 and 31 nominations respectively. Phillips and Thornberry each received 23 nominations, one above the minimum threshold to proceed.

Three candidates, Long-Bailey, Nandy and Starmer, received sufficient combined support from affiliates and constituency parties to proceed to the final ballot. Starmer received the most nominations from both CLPs and affiliates having received nominations from 374 CLPs and 15 affiliates, followed by Long-Bailey with 164 CLPs and seven affiliates, and finally Nandy with 72 CLPs and four affiliates. The results were announced on 4 April 2020, with Starmer winning the election in the first round with 56.2 per cent of the vote, beating Long-Bailey and Nandy and taking over from Corbyn.

=== Nominated ===
The following individuals were nominated by the necessary number of Labour MPs and MEPs as well as receiving backing from the required number of constituency parties or affiliated organisations to proceed to the final ballot before members.

Candidate	Born	Political office	Campaign	Announced	Nominated
Rebecca Long-Bailey	22 September 1979; Old Trafford, Greater Manchester	Shadow Business Secretary (2017–2020); MP for Salford and Eccles (2015–present); Shadow Chief Secretary to the Treasury (2016–2017); Shadow Treasury Minister (2015–2016)	Website	6 January 2020	29 January 2020
Lisa Nandy	9 August 1979; Manchester, England	MP for Wigan (2010–present); Shadow Energy Secretary (2015–2016)	Website	3 January 2020	22 January 2020
Keir Starmer	2 September 1962; Southwark, London	Shadow Brexit Secretary (2016–2020); MP for Holborn and St Pancras (2015–present); Shadow Immigration Minister (2015–2016)	Website	4 January 2020	20 January 2020

=== Eliminated ===
Emily Thornberry failed to receive backing from the required number of constituency parties and affiliated organisations.

Candidate	Born	Political office	Campaign	Announced	Eliminated
Emily Thornberry	27 July 1960; Guildford, Surrey	Shadow First Secretary of State (2017–2020); Shadow Foreign Secretary (2016–2020); MP for Islington South and Finsbury (2005–present); Shadow Brexit Secretary (2016); Shadow Defence Secretary (2016); Shadow Employment Minister (2015–2016); Shadow Attorney General (2011–2014)	Website	18 December 2019	15 February 2020

=== Withdrawn ===
The following candidates withdrew either during the process to receive nominations from MPs and MEPs or during the process to receive nominations from constituency parties or affiliated organisations.

Candidate	Born	Political office	Campaign	Announced	Withdrew
Clive Lewis	11 September 1971; London, England	Shadow Treasury Minister (2018–2020); MP for Norwich South (2015–present); Shadow Business Secretary (2016–2017); Shadow Defence Secretary (2016)	Website	19 December 2019	13 January 2020
Jess Phillips	9 October 1981; Birmingham, England	MP for Birmingham Yardley (2015–present)	Website	3 January 2020	21 January 2020 (Endorsed Nandy)

=== Declined ===
The following individuals were discussed in the media as potential leadership candidates, but chose not to stand:

- Diane Abbott, Shadow Home Secretary (endorsed Long-Bailey)
- Yvette Cooper, chair of the Home Affairs Select Committee since 2016 (endorsed Starmer)
- Barry Gardiner, shadow international trade secretary (endorsed Long-Bailey)
- Dan Jarvis, MP for Barnsley Central, Mayor of the Sheffield City Region (nominated Nandy)
- David Lammy, former universities minister (endorsed Starmer)
- Ian Lavery, Chair of the Labour Party (endorsed Long-Bailey)
- John McDonnell, shadow chancellor (endorsed Long-Bailey)
- Angela Rayner, shadow education secretary (stood for deputy leader, endorsed Long-Bailey)

== Nominations ==
Candidates first needed to be nominated by at least 10 per cent (22) of current Labour MPs and MEPs, who comprise the Parliamentary Labour Party (PLP) and the European Parliamentary Labour Party (EPLP). Candidates who passed this threshold then need nominations from at least 5 per cent (33) Constituency Labour Parties (CLPs), or at least three affiliates including at least two trades unions that together represent at least 5 per cent of affiliated members.

The table below shows the number of nominations achieved by each candidate. A green background indicates that the candidate met the nomination requirements. A pink background indicates that the candidate withdrew from the contest.

Candidate	First stage Labour MPs and MEPs			Second stage					
Candidate	First stage Labour MPs and MEPs			Constituency Labour Parties			Affiliates		
Candidate	Nominations	%		Nominations	%		Nominations	%	
Keir Starmer	88 / 212 (Note: Starmer did not formally nominate himself, therefore the Labour Party lists him as having received 88 nominations, whereas some reports of the contest list him as having received 89 nominations)	41.5%	✓	374 / 648	57.7%	✓	15 / 32	46.9%	✓
Rebecca Long-Bailey	34 / 212	16%	✓	164 / 648 (Note: Bradford West CLP's nomination was declared void due to procedural errors, so has not been counted)	25.3%	✓	7 / 32	21.9%	✓
Lisa Nandy	31 / 212	14.6%	✓	72 / 648	11.1%	✓	4 / 32	12.5%	✓
Emily Thornberry (eliminated)	23 / 212	10.8%	✓	31 / 648	4.8%	✗	0 / 32	0%	✗
Jess Phillips (withdrawn)	23 / 212	10.8%	✓	0 / 648	0%		0 / 32	0%	
Clive Lewis (withdrawn)	5 / 212	2.4%							
Total nominations	198 / 212 (Note: Not including Lewis's nominations and not taking Starmer as having nominated himself)	93.4%		641 / 648 (Note: Not including Bradford West CLP's nomination)	98.9%		26 / 32	81.3%	

== Timeline ==
=== Overview ===
Candidate status
Nominated, on the membership ballot
Eliminated during the nominations stage
Withdrew from the election
Events
Corbyn announces his resignation
Nominations from the PLP and EPLP close
First leadership hustings
Nominations from CLPs and affiliates close
Membership ballot opens
Membership ballot closes
Result announced

=== 2019 ===
- 12 December: Labour loses 60 seats in the 2019 general election
- 13 December: Jeremy Corbyn announces his resignation as leader of the Labour Party effective the outcome of the 2020 leadership election
- 18 December: Emily Thornberry announces her candidacy
- 19 December: Clive Lewis announces his candidacy

=== 2020 ===
==== January ====
- 3 January: Jess Phillips and Lisa Nandy announce their candidacies
- 4 January: Keir Starmer announces his candidacy
- 6 January: Rebecca Long-Bailey announces her candidacy
- 7 January: Nominations from the Parliamentary Labour Party (PLP) and European Parliamentary Labour Party (EPLP) open
- 13 January:
  - Lewis withdraws his candidacy
  - Parliamentary nominations close at 14:30; Long-Bailey, Nandy, Phillips, Starmer and Thornberry proceed to the next stage
- 15 January: Nominations from constituency parties (CLPs) and affiliate organisations open
- 18 January: The first leadership hustings is held in Liverpool
- 20 January: Starmer receives the required number of nominations to progress to the membership ballot
- 21 January: Phillips withdraws her candidacy
- 22 January:
  - Nandy receives the required number of nominations to progress to the membership ballot
  - Phillips endorses Nandy
- 29 January: Long-Bailey receives the required number of nominations to progress to the membership ballot

==== February ====
- 12 February: The first televised debate is held during a special edition of Newsnight
- 15 February: Constituency and affiliate nominations close at midnight; Thornberry fails to receive the required number of nominations and is eliminated
- 24 February: Labour Party members start receiving postal ballots and online voting forms

==== April ====
- 2 April: Voting closes at midday
- 4 April: Result of the membership ballot announced at 10:45 am. Keir Starmer declared the new leader of the Labour Party and becomes Leader of the Opposition with 56.2 per cent of ballots cast

== Results ==
The result of the election as well as the corresponding contest for deputy leader was announced at 10:45 am (BST) on 4 April 2020. The announcement was originally due to take place at a special conference in London but, due to the COVID-19 pandemic, it was cancelled in favour of a "scaled-back event".

Keir Starmer won the Labour leadership election in the first round of voting.

Full result
Candidate	Party members		Registered supporters		Affiliated supporters		Total	
Candidate	Votes	%	Votes	%	Votes	%	Votes	%
Keir Starmer	225,135	56.1%	10,228	76.6%	40,417	53.1%	275,780	56.2%
Rebecca Long-Bailey	117,598	29.3%	650	5.0%	16,970	22.3%	135,218	27.6%
Lisa Nandy	58,788	14.6%	2,128	17.4%	18,681	24.6%	79,597	16.2%

Turnout was 62.6 per cent. There were 490,731 returned ballots, from a total of 784,181 eligible voters. 136 ballot papers were spoiled.

== Campaign platforms ==
=== Long-Bailey ===
Long-Bailey created a four-point plan titled "Aspirational socialism"; empower the movement and raise trade union membership; a "Democratic Revolution" and; a "Green Industrial Revolution". Long-Bailey promised that she would continue to develop the "Green New Deal" policies that she had introduced to the party's 2019 election manifesto. On democratic reform, Long-Bailey called for constitutional reform to spread power more evenly across the country, including abolishing the House of Lords.

Long-Bailey stated that if she were to win the leadership election the Labour Party would maintain its commitment to bring energy, water, rail and mail back into public ownership. She has also supported open selection as a process of selection for Labour MPs.

Long-Bailey and her platform were described by the media as "continuity Corbyn" because of her closeness to Corbyn, Momentum and the left of the Labour party, although she rejected the label.

In response to the release of U.S. President Donald Trump's peace plan to resolve the Israeli–Palestinian conflict, Long-Bailey criticised the proposals, stating that they would "only perpetuate conflict" and "undermine rights of the Palestinian people".

During the COVID-19 pandemic, Long-Bailey made several recommendations to the government. She advocated the government look at a universal basic income for all people in the United Kingdom regardless of wealth, and to eliminate the five-week waiting time before claimants can receive Universal Credit. Later in March, she advocated a National Food Service, where workers from Royal Mail deliver basic goods like food, medicine and toiletries to households to reduce pressure on supermarkets. In an article, Long-Bailey advocated that the government should buy shares in key industries and put these shares into a "social wealth fund". She stated that: "This crisis should make us realise that we're all connected – that the chief executive relies on the refuse worker, the corporate lawyer on the supermarket worker, and the politician on the nurse. And this realisation should power how we rebuild our economy when the crisis is over."

Long-Bailey was the first candidate to publish a list of donors to her campaign, with primary funding coming from trade unions Unite (£215,000) and the Communication Workers Union (£52,000), plus small individual donations solicited from members of left-wing organisation Momentum (£120,000).

=== Nandy ===
In January, Nandy accused the Blair and Brown governments of continuing the "consensus that Thatcher built". She criticised New Labour for being "as tight as the Tories". She called for "a modern, empowering welfare state for the 21st century". She praised Corbyn for shifting party policy towards a position that opposes austerity and stated her intention to abolish Universal Credit.

During the party hustings held in Bristol, Nandy argued that the honours system should have references to the British Empire removed and replaced with 'Excellence'.

Nandy defended free movement within the European Union, while also arguing that concerns about its flaws should not be simply dismissed as "racist anti-immigrant rhetoric".

Nandy is opposed to Scottish independence and argued that Labour should "look to Catalonia and Quebec" as examples for dealing with "divisive nationalism", later clarifying that the party can learn from the Socialist Party in Spain that has shown how "the cause of social justice has beaten divisive nationalism". She has said she wants Scottish Labour to be represented in the shadow cabinet and has also pledged not to interfere in devolved policymaking, allowing Scottish Labour to decide their own approach to independence. She also stated that British federalism would not resolve the political division between England and Scotland.

In February, deputy leadership candidate Richard Burgon proposed a "Peace Pledge" to ensure that the party would not support future military action unless its members vote in favour of such a policy. Nandy voiced her strong disapproval of the pledge. She argued that civilians in war zones could not afford to wait for such a ballot to pass and it was irresponsible to share such classified information.

In an interview with The Jewish Chronicle, Nandy acknowledged that the party had lost the trust of the British Jewish community as a result of its "failure of leadership" and poor handling of antisemitism in the Party. She also said that she believed that the word 'Zionism' had become "horribly distorted and weaponised" by some in the party; Nandy denounced those who questioned Israel's right to exist and reiterated her view that advocating the rights of Palestinians does not contradict support for Israel. She has chaired Labour Friends of Palestine since 2018.

When she spoke to the Evening Standard in January, Nandy called on party general secretary Jennie Formby to publish the evidence that had been submitted to the Equality and Human Rights Commission, as part of the commission's investigation into institutional antisemitism in the party. She added that openness and transparency would necessary to rebuild trust with the British Jewish community.

Nandy said that she would conduct a "fair recruitment process" for parliamentary candidates and end the practice of "parachuting" those favoured by the leadership. She criticised the centralised approach taken during the 2019 general election, in which a number of candidates were "imposed" by Corbyn and his allies. Nandy has also stated that she would end the practice of nominating peers to the House of Lords. This announcement came after the Labour Party controversially nominated John Bercow, former Commons Speaker, and Karie Murphy, Corbyn's former chief of staff.

During a speech in Bassetlaw, one of the "red wall" constituencies gained by the Conservatives in 2019, Nandy announced that a future shadow cabinet led by her would involve the representation of local Labour councillors, giving a seat to the elected Leader of the Local Government Association Labour Group. She also pledged that she would give councillors the right to nominate candidates in future leadership elections, just as MPs and MEPs had during the previous month.

Nandy expressed opposition to open selection and in favour of the current method for selection of Labour MPs.

Nandy released a list of donors to her leadership campaign, which was principally supported by the GMB trade union and featured four private donations of over £10,000 from individuals including her husband Andrew Collis, businessmen Jason Stockwood and Tom Shutes, and Hope Not Hate chair Simon Tuttle.

=== Starmer ===
Starmer positioned himself in opposition to austerity, stating that Corbyn was "right" to position Labour as the "party of anti-austerity". Starmer indicated he would continue with the Labour policy of scrapping tuition fees. He also pledged "common ownership" of rail, mail, energy and water companies and called for ending outsourcing in the NHS, local governments and the justice system. In 2022 Starmer was alleged to have broken his pledge on "common ownership" of rail, mail, energy and water companies.

In February 2020, Starmer announced that he would continue the policy introduced under Shadow Chancellor John McDonnell to raise taxes on the top five per cent of earners with incomes of more than £80,000.

Starmer argued that the party should propose the reintroduction of free movement within the European Union.

In response to the release of Trump's peace plan to resolve the Israeli–Palestinian conflict, Starmer described the proposals as "inconsistent with international law and human rights protections".

Starmer said he is "not against the principle" of open selection but did not indicate clear support or opposition to it.

Starmer's leadership campaign gained funding from trade union Unison, and donations from several individuals, including £100,000 and £5,000 respectively from barristers Robert Latham and Richard Hermer, as well as hotel bills totalling £2,500 from a company linked to Labour donor Farah Sassoon.

== Hustings and debates ==
=== Public hustings ===
Several hustings events took place throughout the campaign, for both leadership and deputy leadership candidates. Labour-organised hustings took place on weekends throughout January and February 2020, at 11 locations in Great Britain. No hustings were held in Northern Ireland.

Date	Host	Moderator	Venue	Map
18 January 2020	Labour Party	Liam Thorp (Political Editor, Liverpool Echo)	Arena and Convention Centre, Liverpool	2020 Labour Party leadership election (UK) is located in the United Kingdom
25 January 2020 (cancelled)	Labour Party	—	Royal Armouries, Leeds	2020 Labour Party leadership election (UK) is located in the United Kingdom
26 January 2020 (Note: Starmer did not attend)	Open Labour	Rachel Shabi (journalist and author)	Nottingham Trent University, Nottingham	2020 Labour Party leadership election (UK) is located in the United Kingdom
1 February 2020	Labour Party	Doina Cornell (Leader of Stroud District Council)	Ashton Gate Stadium, Bristol	2020 Labour Party leadership election (UK) is located in the United Kingdom
2 February 2020	Labour Party	Ruth Mosalski (Political Editor, Wales Online)	City Hall, Cardiff	2020 Labour Party leadership election (UK) is located in the United Kingdom
8 February 2020 (Note: Jim McMahon stood in for Starmer)	LGA Labour Group	Nick Forbes (Leader of Newcastle City Council)	University of Nottingham, Nottingham	2020 Labour Party leadership election (UK) is located in the United Kingdom
13 February 2020	Jewish Labour Movement	Robert Peston (Political Editor, ITV News)	Liberal Jewish Synagogue, St John's Wood	2020 Labour Party leadership election (UK) is located in the United Kingdom
15 February 2020	Labour Party	Cara Hilton (Chair of the Scottish Labour Party)	SEC Centre, Glasgow	2020 Labour Party leadership election (UK) is located in the United Kingdom
16 February 2020	Co-operative Party	Chanté Joseph (journalist)	Business Design Centre, Islington	2020 Labour Party leadership election (UK) is located in the United Kingdom
16 February 2020 (cancelled)	National Education Union	Kevin Courtney (General Secretary of the NEU)	University College London, Bloomsbury	2020 Labour Party leadership election (UK) is located in the United Kingdom
18 February 2020	LGBT+ Labour	Benjamin Cohen (Chief Executive, PinkNews)	Manchester Central, Manchester	2020 Labour Party leadership election (UK) is located in the United Kingdom
22 February 2020	Labour Party	Stephen Bush (Political Editor, New Statesman)	Holiday Inn, Peterborough	2020 Labour Party leadership election (UK) is located in the United Kingdom
22 February 2020	Labour Party	Vaughan West (Chair of Labour East)	Wyboston Lakes, Wyboston	2020 Labour Party leadership election (UK) is located in the United Kingdom
23 February 2020	Labour Party	David Anderson, (former MP for Blaydon)	Radisson Blu Hotel, Durham	2020 Labour Party leadership election (UK) is located in the United Kingdom
25 February 2020	The Guardian	Anushka Asthana, (Editor-at-large, The Guardian)	Manchester Central, Manchester	2020 Labour Party leadership election (UK) is located in the United Kingdom
29 February 2020	Labour Party	Fatima Manji, (presenter, Channel 4 News)	Grand Brighton Hotel, Brighton	2020 Labour Party leadership election (UK) is located in the United Kingdom
4 March 2020	Labour Women's Network	Jacqui Smith, (former Home Secretary)	Seven Dials Club, Covent Garden	2020 Labour Party leadership election (UK) is located in the United Kingdom
8 March 2020	Daily Mirror	Alison Phillips (Editor, Daily Mirror)	Town Hall, Dudley	2020 Labour Party leadership election (UK) is located in the United Kingdom

The locations sparked criticism from some candidates because of lack of geographic spread. After the backlash, two new events in Leeds and Brighton were later added by Labour's ruling National Executive Committee (NEC), although the one in Leeds was subsequently cancelled after Starmer dropped out due to his mother-in-law being critically ill. The Guardian also announced that it would host a hustings in Manchester on 22 February, chaired by journalist Anushka Asthana. Starmer's mother-in-law died on 9 February, resulting in the postponement of the Dudley hustings scheduled for that day, which later took place on 8 March 2020 as the final hustings.

=== Televised debates ===
On 12 February, a debate took place on Newsnight, moderated by presenter Katie Razzall and broadcast on BBC Two. A second debate was held the following day, moderated by Victoria Derbyshire on her programme, followed by a third one chaired by Krishnan Guru-Murthy on Channel 4 News.

No.	Date and time	Location	Programme	Broadcaster	Presenter(s)	Viewers (millions)	Candidates			
P Participant A Absent invitee O Out of race (eliminated or withdrawn) N No debate							Long-Bailey	Nandy	Starmer	Thornberry
Before the close of nominations
1	12 February 2020; 22:30	Broadcasting House, London	Labour Leadership 2020: A Newsnight Special	BBC Two	Katie Razzall	TBA	P	P	P	P
2	13 February 2020; 09:30	Broadcasting House, London	Victoria Derbyshire: Labour Leader Special	BBC Two	Victoria Derbyshire	TBA	P	P	P	P
After the close of nominations
3	17 February 2020; 20:00	Town Hall, Dudley	Live: The Labour Leadership Debate	Channel 4	Krishnan Guru-Murthy	TBA	P	P	P	O
4	27 February 2020; 20:00	Town Hall, Dewsbury	The Labour Debate: Live with Sophy Ridge	Sky News	Sophy Ridge	TBA	P	P	P	O

== Endorsements ==
- 2015 leadership election • Endorsements
- 2016 leadership election • Endorsements
- 2020 leadership election • Endorsements

Candidates and potential candidates received the support of organisations, publications, and of notable individuals. This list does not include official parliamentary, constituency or affiliate nominations.

=== Rebecca Long-Bailey ===
- Grace Blakeley, economics commentator
- Momentum
- Maxine Peake, actress
- Mark Serwotka, leader of the PCS trade union
- Colin Burgon, former MP

=== Lisa Nandy ===
- Tom Copley, London Assembly member
- Tony Cunningham, former MP for Workington and former minister
- Peter Hain, Labour peer, former MP for Neath and former minister
- Ian McCartney, former MP for Makerfield
- Melanie Onn, former MP for Great Grimsby (previously endorsed Jess Phillips)
- Jack McConnell, Labour peer and former first minister of Scotland
- George Monbiot, writer and environmental and political activist
- Estelle Morris, Labour peer, former MP for Birmingham Yardley and former minister
- Catherine McKinnell, Labour MP for Newcastle upon Tyne North (previously endorsed Jess Phillips)
- Ann Taylor, Labour peer, former MP for Dewsbury and former minister
- Open Labour, activist group operating within the Labour Party, but not an official affiliate

=== Keir Starmer ===
- Andrew Adonis, Labour peer
- Gordon Brown, former Prime Minister
- Jenny Chapman, former MP for Darlington
- Vernon Coaker, former MP for Gedling and former minister
- Nic Dakin, former MP for Scunthorpe
- Alf Dubs, Labour peer and former MP for Battersea
- Evening Standard, politically conservative London newspaper and online news service
- David Hanson, former MP for Delyn and former minister
- Lesley Laird, former Deputy Leader of Scottish Labour and former MP for Kirkcaldy and Cowdenbeath
- Emma Reynolds, former MP for Wolverhampton North East
- Carwyn Jones, former First Minister of Wales
- Sadiq Khan, Mayor of London
- Doreen Lawrence, Labour peer, campaigner and mother of Stephen Lawrence
- Paul Mason, journalist and broadcaster (second choice after his support for Lewis)
- Jeremy Miles, Counsel General for Wales and AM for Neath
- Sally Phillips, actress
- Jack Sargeant, AM for Alyn and Deeside
- Ricky Tomlinson, actor

=== Withdrawn candidates ===
Clive Lewis was endorsed by the journalist and broadcaster Paul Mason before he withdrew. Before she withdrew, Jess Phillips was endorsed by the journalist and former Spectator editor Matthew d'Ancona, Labour MP Margaret Hodge, the Labour peer Philip Hunt and Melanie Onn, the former MP for Great Grimsby.

== Opinion polls ==
View source data.

Date(s) conducted	Pollster/client	Sample size	First preferences						Final preferences	
Date(s) conducted	Pollster/client	Sample size	Long-Bailey	Nandy	Phillips	Starmer	Thornberry	Others	Long-Bailey	Starmer
Result		490,731 Labour members, registered and affiliated supporters	27.6%	16.2%	–	56.2%	–	–	–	–
21–24 February 2020	Survation/LabourList	1,196 Labour members, registered and affiliated supporters	34%	21%	–	45%	–	–	36%	64%
20–25 February 2020	YouGov/Sky News	1,323 Labour members, registered and affiliated supporters	31%	16%	–	53%	–	—	34%	66%
13–15 January 2020	YouGov/The Times	1,005 Labour members	32%	7%	11%	46%	3%	–	37%	63%
8–13 January 2020	Survation/LabourList	3,800 LabourList readers who are also Labour members	42%	7%	10%	37%	1%	—	51%	49%
21–31 December 2019	YouGov/Party Members Project	1,059 Labour members	23%	6%	12%	36%	7%	16% (Note: Yvette Cooper and Clive Lewis with 8 per cent each)	39%	61%

=== Voting intention for Labour under each candidate ===
A poll was also conducted to garner the prospective voting intentions of the public for the Labour Party under each leadership candidate in a general election.

Date(s) conducted	Pollster/client	Sample size	Labour Party voting intention under each candidate				
Date(s) conducted	Pollster/client	Sample size	At present (Corbyn)	Long-Bailey	Nandy	Starmer	Thornberry
31 January- 3 February 2020	IpsosMori/Evening Standard	1,001	30%	28%	32%	35%	33%

== See also ==
- 2020 Labour Party deputy leadership election
- 2020 Scottish Labour deputy leadership election
- 2020 Liberal Democrats leadership election
- Nominations in the 2020 Labour Party leadership election
- Nominations in the 2020 Labour Party deputy leadership election
- 2020 Green Party of England and Wales leadership election
