= Nominations in the 2020 Labour Party leadership election =

The following list shows all Labour Party Members of Parliament (MPs), Members of the European Parliament (MEPs), Constituency Labour Parties (CLPs), affiliated trades unions and socialist societies that nominated a candidate in the 2020 Labour Party leadership election.

== Rebecca Long-Bailey ==
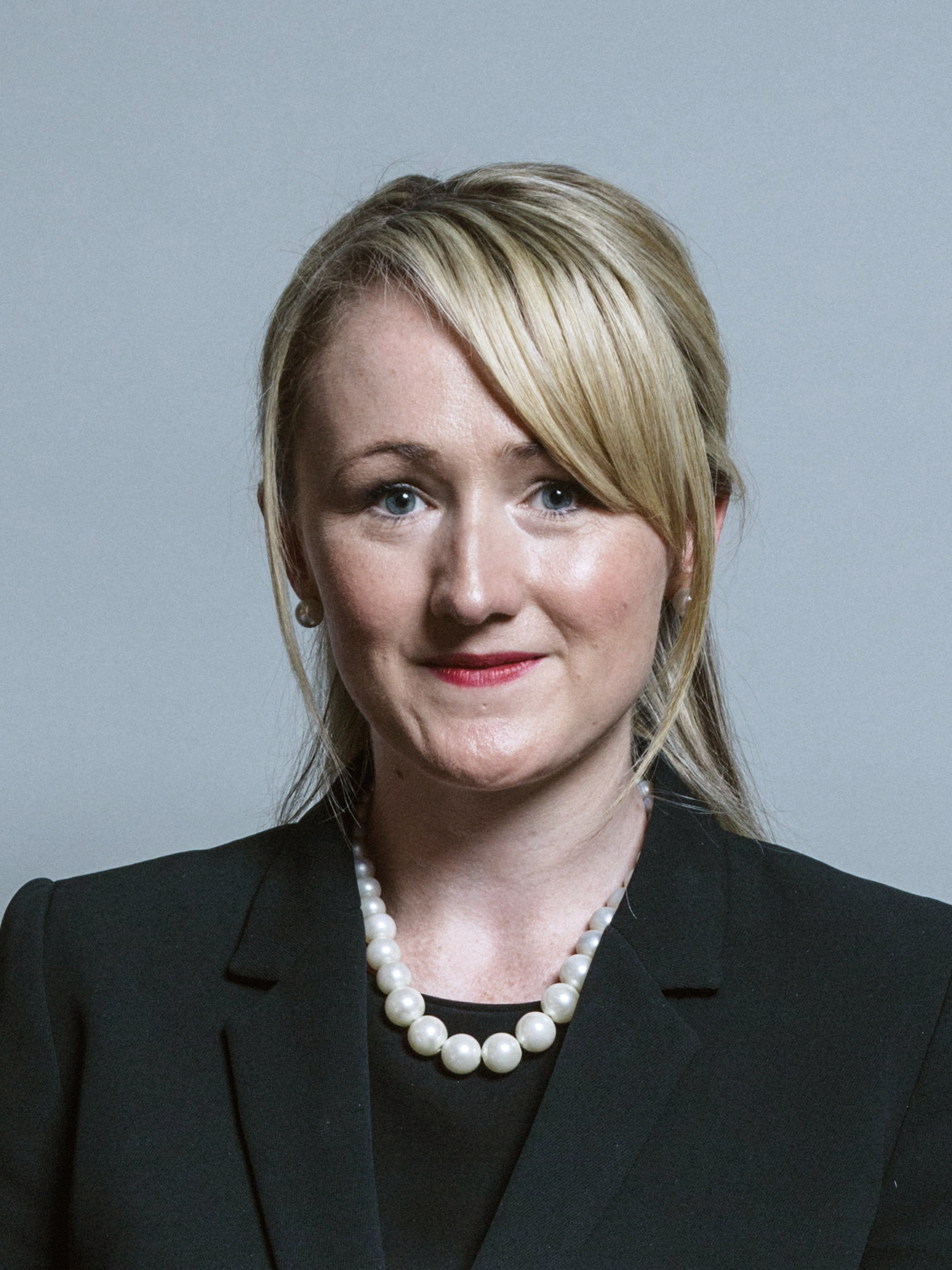
Rebecca Long-Bailey

=== Members of Parliament ===
1. Diane Abbott, Shadow Home Secretary and MP for Hackney North and Stoke Newington
2. Tahir Ali, MP for Birmingham Hall Green
3. Paula Barker, MP for Liverpool Wavertree
4. Apsana Begum, MP for Poplar and Limehouse
5. Olivia Blake, MP for Sheffield Hallam
6. Richard Burgon, Shadow Justice secretary and MP for Leeds East
7. Ian Byrne, MP for Liverpool West Derby
8. Dan Carden, Shadow Secretary of State for International Development and MP for Liverpool Walton
9. Peter Dowd, Shadow Chief Secretary to the Treasury and MP for Bootle
10. Mary Foy, MP for City of Durham
11. Barry Gardiner, MP for Brent North and shadow secretary of state for international trade
12. Margaret Greenwood, Shadow Work and Pensions secretary and MP for Wirral West
13. Rachel Hopkins, MP for Luton South
14. Imran Hussain, Shadow Justice minister and MP for Bradford East
15. Kim Johnson, MP for Liverpool Riverside
16. Ian Lavery, Chairman of the Labour Party and MP for Wansbeck
17. Rebecca Long-Bailey (self)
18. Andy McDonald, Shadow Transport secretary and MP for Middlesbrough
19. John McDonnell, Shadow Chancellor of the Exchequer and MP for Hayes and Harlington
20. Ian Mearns, MP for Gateshead
21. Nav Mishra, MP for Stockport
22. Grahame Morris, MP for Easington
23. Kate Osborne, MP for Jarrow
24. Angela Rayner, Shadow Secretary of State for Education and MP for Ashton-under-Lyne
25. Bell Ribeiro-Addy, MP for Streatham
26. Lloyd Russell-Moyle, MP for Brighton Kemptown (initially nominated Clive Lewis)
27. Cat Smith, MP for Lancaster and Fleetwood and shadow leader of the House of Commons
28. Zarah Sultana, MP for Coventry South
29. Sam Tarry, MP for Ilford South
30. Jon Trickett, MP for Hemsworth and shadow lord president of the council
31. Claudia Webbe, MP for Leicester East
32. Mick Whitley, MP for Birkenhead
33. Beth Winter, MP for Cynon Valley

=== Constituency Labour Parties ===
1. Aberconwy CLP
2. Almond Valley CLP
3. Angus North and Mearns CLP
4. Ashton-under-Lyne CLP
5. Bath CLP
6. Battersea CLP
7. Berwick-upon-Tweed CLP
8. Bexhill and Battle CLP
9. Birkenhead CLP
10. Birmingham Hall Green CLP
11. Birmingham Hodge Hill CLP
12. Blackley and Broughton CLP
13. Blackpool South CLP
14. Blyth Valley CLP
15. Bognor Regis and Littlehampton CLP
16. Bolton South East CLP
17. Bolton West CLP
18. Bootle CLP
19. Boston and Skegness CLP
20. Bournemouth East CLP
21. Bournemouth West CLP
22. Bradford East CLP
23. ~~Bradford West CLP~~ (void)
24. Brighton Kemptown CLP
25. Brighton Pavilion CLP
26. Bristol North West CLP
27. Bristol West CLP
28. Bromley and Chislehurst CLP
29. Broxtowe CLP
30. Calder Valley CLP
31. Camberwell and Peckham CLP
32. Camborne and Redruth CLP
33. Carmarthen East and Dinefwr CLP
34. Ceredigion CLP
35. Charnwood CLP
36. Chatham and Aylesford CLP
37. Cheltenham CLP
38. Christchurch CLP
39. Clacton CLP
40. Cleethorpes CLP
41. Clwyd South CLP
42. Colchester CLP
43. Copeland CLP
44. Coventry North West CLP
45. Crawley CLP
46. Crewe and Nantwich CLP
47. Dartford CLP
48. Dudley North CLP
49. Dundee City East CLP
50. Dundee City West CLP
51. Easington CLP
52. Ealing Southall CLP
53. Eastbourne CLP
54. Edinburgh Central CLP
55. Edmonton CLP
56. Ellesmere Port and Neston CLP
57. Elmet and Rothwell CLP
58. Enfield North CLP
59. Erith and Thamesmead CLP
60. Folkestone and Hythe CLP
61. Fylde CLP
62. Gainsborough CLP
63. Glasgow Kelvin CLP
64. Hackney North and Stoke Newington CLP
65. Hackney South and Shoreditch CLP
66. Harborough CLP
67. Harrow East CLP
68. Hastings and Rye CLP
69. Hayes and Harlington CLP
70. Hemsworth CLP
71. Hereford and South Herefordshire CLP
72. Heywood and Middleton CLP
73. Hull North CLP
74. Hull West and Hessle CLP
75. Huntingdon CLP
76. Kensington CLP
77. Kilmarnock and Irvine Valley CLP
78. Kingswood CLP
79. Knowsley CLP
80. Lancaster and Fleetwood CLP
81. Leeds Central CLP
82. Leeds East CLP
83. Leicester West CLP
84. Lewisham Deptford CLP
85. Leyton and Wanstead CLP
86. Lincoln CLP
87. Liverpool Riverside CLP
88. Liverpool Walton CLP
89. Liverpool Wavertree CLP
90. Liverpool West Derby CLP
91. Ludlow CLP
92. Luton North CLP
93. Makerfield CLP
94. Maldon CLP
95. Manchester Central CLP
96. Manchester Gorton CLP
97. Mansfield CLP
98. Mid Dorset and North Poole CLP
99. Mid Sussex CLP
100. Montgomeryshire CLP
101. New Forest East CLP
102. Newton Abbot CLP
103. North Devon CLP
104. North East Cambridgeshire CLP
105. North Thanet CLP
106. North West Cambridgeshire CLP
107. Northampton North CLP
108. North West Durham CLP
109. Norwich North CLP
110. Nottingham East CLP
111. Orkney CLP
112. Pendle CLP
113. Penrith and The Border CLP
114. Plymouth Moor View CLP
115. Poole CLP
116. Preston CLP
117. Redcar CLP
118. Romford CLP
119. Rotherham CLP
120. Salford and Eccles CLP
121. Sedgefield CLP
122. Sefton Central CLP
123. Sherwood CLP
124. Shetland CLP
125. South Basildon and East Thurrock CLP
126. South Holland and the Deepings CLP
127. South Thanet
128. South West Bedfordshire CLP
129. South West Devon CLP
130. South West Hertfordshire CLP
131. Southampton Itchen CLP
132. Southend West CLP
133. St Austell and Newquay CLP
134. St Helens South and Whiston CLP
135. Staffordshire Moorlands CLP
136. Stockport CLP
137. Stoke-on-Trent Central CLP
138. Sutton and Cheam CLP
139. Thornbury and Yate CLP
140. Torridge and West Devon CLP
141. Tottenham CLP
142. Uddingston and Bellshill CLP
143. Uxbridge and South Ruislip CLP
144. Wakefield CLP
145. Wallasey CLP
146. Walsall South CLP
147. Wansbeck CLP
148. Warley CLP
149. Weaver Vale CLP
150. Wellingborough CLP
151. Wells CLP
152. West Bromwich West CLP
153. West Dorset CLP
154. West Ham CLP
155. West Suffolk CLP
156. Westmorland and Lonsdale CLP
157. Weston-super-Mare CLP
158. Windsor CLP
159. Wirral South CLP
160. Wirral West CLP
161. Wolverhampton South West CLP
162. Worsley and Eccles South CLP
163. Worthing West CLP
164. Wycombe CLP
165. Yeovil CLP

=== Affiliated trades unions ===
1. Associated Society of Locomotive Engineers and Firemen (ASLEF)
2. Bakers, Food and Allied Workers' Union (BFAWU)
3. Communication Workers Union (CWU)
4. Fire Brigades Union (FBU)
5. Unite the Union

=== Socialist societies ===
1. Disability Labour
2. Socialist Educational Association

== Lisa Nandy ==
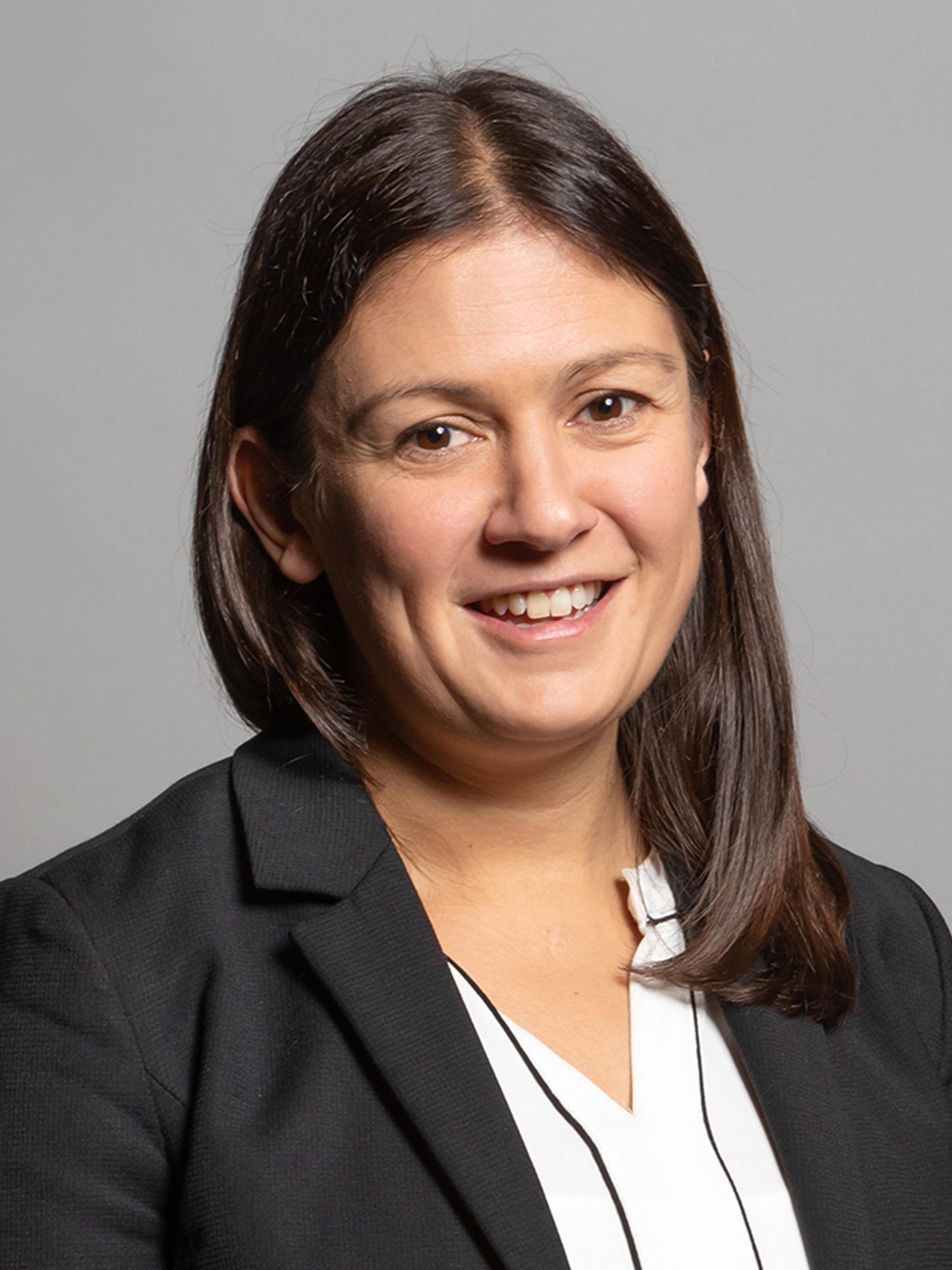
Lisa Nandy

=== Members of Parliament ===
1. Jonathan Ashworth, shadow health secretary and MP for Leicester South
2. Kevin Brennan, shadow arts and heritage minister and MP for Cardiff West
3. Feryal Clark, MP for Enfield North
4. Rosie Cooper, MP for West Lancashire
5. Stella Creasy, MP for Walthamstow
6. Jon Cruddas, MP for Dagenham and Rainham
7. Tanmanjeet Singh Dhesi, Parliamentary Private Secretary to the Leader of the Opposition and MP for Slough
8. Jack Dromey, shadow pensions minister and MP for Birmingham Erdington
9. Yvonne Fovargue, MP for Makerfield
10. Vicky Foxcroft, shadow civil society minister and MP for Lewisham Deptford
11. Gill Furniss, shadow minister for steel, postal affairs, and consumer protection and MP for Sheffield Brightside and Hillsborough
12. Kate Green, MP for Stretford and Urmston
13. Lilian Greenwood, MP for Nottingham South
14. Louise Haigh, shadow policing minister and MP for Sheffield Heeley
15. Mark Hendrick, MP for Preston
16. Sharon Hodgson, shadow public health minister and MP for Washington and Sunderland West
17. Dan Jarvis, MP for Barnsley Central
18. Ruth Jones, MP for Newport West
19. Mike Kane, shadow schools minister and MP for Wythenshawe and Sale East
20. Stephen Kinnock, MP for Aberavon
21. Emma Lewell-Buck, MP for South Shields
22. Tony Lloyd, Shadow Secretary of State for Scotland, Shadow Secretary of State for Northern Ireland and MP for Rochdale
23. Justin Madders, MP for Ellesmere Port and Neston
24. Lisa Nandy (self)
25. Alex Norris, MP for Nottingham North
26. Abena Oppong-Asare, MP for Erith and Thamesmead
27. Taiwo Owatemi, MP for Coventry North West
28. Sarah Owen, MP for Luton North
29. Stephanie Peacock, MP for Barnsley East
30. Graham Stringer, MP for Blackley and Broughton
31. Derek Twigg, MP for Halton

=== Constituency Labour Parties ===
1. Aberavon CLP
2. Arundel and South Downs CLP
3. Ashfield CLP
4. Ashford CLP
5. Barnsley Central CLP
6. Barnsley East CLP
7. Bassetlaw CLP
8. Bermondsey and Old Southwark CLP
9. Birmingham Northfield CLP
10. Birmingham Yardley CLP
11. Blackpool North and Cleveleys CLP
12. Bolsover CLP
13. Broxbourne CLP
14. Burnley CLP
15. Bury North CLP
16. Bury South CLP
17. Cannock Chase CLP
18. Chippenham CLP
19. City of Durham CLP
20. Clwyd West CLP
21. Congleton CLP
22. Coventry South CLP
23. Croydon South CLP
24. Cumbernauld and Kilsyth CLP
25. Dagenham and Rainham CLP
26. Delyn CLP
27. Don Valley CLP
28. Dudley South CLP
29. Edinburgh Southern CLP
30. Erewash CLP
31. Faversham and Mid Kent CLP
32. Gloucester CLP
33. Gosport CLP
34. Great Grimsby CLP
35. Halton CLP
36. Hazel Grove CLP
37. Hull East CLP
38. Kingston and Surbiton CLP
39. Llanelli CLP
40. Louth and Horncastle CLP
41. Meon Valley CLP
42. Middlesbrough CLP
43. Mitcham and Morden CLP
44. Morecambe and Lunesdale CLP
45. Morley and Outwood CLP
46. Newark CLP
47. Newcastle-under-Lyme CLP
48. North Dorset CLP
49. North Warwickshire CLP
50. North West Leicestershire CLP
51. Northampton South CLP
52. Nottingham North CLP
53. Perthshire North CLP
54. Perthshire South and Kinross-shire CLP
55. Rother Valley CLP
56. Ruislip, Northwood and Pinner CLP
57. Sheffield Brightside and Hillsborough CLP
58. Sheffield Heeley CLP
59. Slough CLP
60. South Derbyshire CLP
61. Stockton South CLP
62. Stoke-on-Trent North CLP
63. Stretford and Urmston CLP
64. Tooting CLP
65. Vauxhall CLP
66. Walthamstow CLP
67. Warrington North CLP
68. Wigan CLP
69. Wokingham CLP
70. Wolverhampton North East CLP
71. Wythenshawe and Sale East CLP
72. York Outer CLP

=== Affiliated trades unions ===
1. General, Municipal, Boilermakers (GMB)
2. National Union of Mineworkers (NUM)

=== Socialist societies ===
1. Chinese for Labour
2. Jewish Labour Movement

== Keir Starmer ==
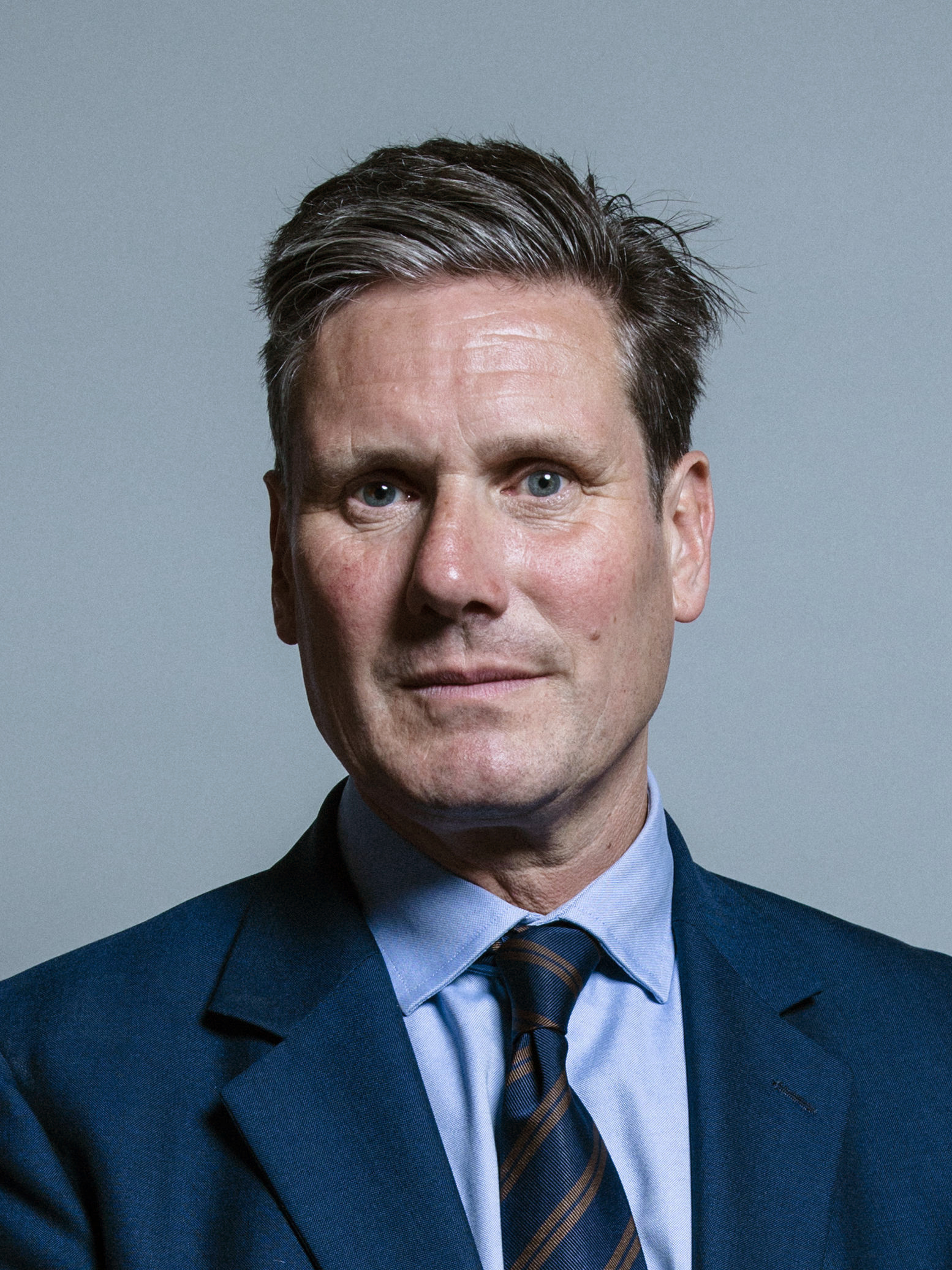
Keir Starmer

=== Members of Parliament ===
1. Debbie Abrahams, MP for Oldham East and Saddleworth
2. Rushanara Ali, MP for Bethnal Green and Bow
3. Mike Amesbury, Shadow Minister for Employment and MP for Weaver Vale
4. Fleur Anderson, MP for Putney
5. Margaret Beckett, MP for Derby South
6. Hilary Benn, MP for Leeds Central
7. Clive Betts, MP for Sheffield South East
8. Paul Blomfield, shadow Brexit minister and MP for Sheffield Central
9. Tracy Brabin, Shadow Secretary of State for Digital, Culture, Media and Sport and MP for Batley and Spen
10. Ben Bradshaw, MP for Exeter
11. Nick Brown, opposition chief whip and MP for Newcastle upon Tyne East
12. Karen Buck, MP for Westminster North
13. Alan Campbell, MP for Tynemouth
14. Bambos Charalambous, MP for Enfield Southgate
15. Yvette Cooper, former Shadow Home Secretary and MP for Normanton, Pontefract and Castleford
16. Judith Cummins, shadow international trade minister and MP for Bradford South
17. Alex Cunningham, MP for Stockton North
18. Janet Daby, MP for Lewisham East
19. Wayne David, shadow armed forces minister and MP for Caerphilly
20. Geraint Davies, MP for Swansea West
21. Thangam Debbonaire, shadow Brexit minister and MP for Bristol West
22. Marsha de Cordova, shadow minister for Disabled People and MP for Battersea
23. Anneliese Dodds, shadow Treasury minister and MP for Oxford East
24. Stephen Doughty, MP for Cardiff South and Penarth
25. Angela Eagle, MP for Wallasey
26. Maria Eagle, MP for Garston and Halewood
27. Clive Efford, MP for Eltham
28. Chris Elmore, Opposition Whip and MP for Ogmore
29. Florence Eshalomi, MP for Vauxhall
30. Bill Esterson, shadow international trade minister and MP for Sefton Central
31. Chris Evans, MP for Islwyn
32. Preet Gill, shadow international development minister and MP for Birmingham Edgbaston
33. Mary Glindon, MP for North Tyneside
34. Andrew Gwynne, Shadow Secretary of State for Communities and Local Government and MP for Denton and Reddish
35. Emma Hardy, MP for Kingston upon Hull West and Hessle
36. Carolyn Harris, Deputy Leader of Welsh Labour, shadow home affairs and women and equalities minister and MP for Swansea East
37. Helen Hayes, MP for Dulwich and West Norwood
38. John Healey, shadow housing secretary and MP for Wentworth and Dearne
39. Mike Hill, MP for Hartlepool
40. Kate Hollern, MP for Blackburn
41. George Howarth, MP for Knowsley
42. Rupa Huq, MP for Ealing Central and Acton
43. Diana Johnson, MP for Kingston upon Hull North
44. Kevan Jones, MP for North Durham
45. Sarah Jones, shadow housing minister and MP for Croydon Central
46. Barbara Keeley, shadow minister for mental health and social care and MP for Worsley and Eccles South
47. David Lammy, MP for Tottenham
48. Seema Malhotra, MP for Feltham and Heston
49. Chris Matheson, shadow cabinet office minister and MP for the City of Chester
50. Steve McCabe, MP for Birmingham Selly Oak
51. Kerry McCarthy, MP for Bristol East
52. Conor McGinn, MP for St Helens North
53. Jim McMahon, shadow local government minister and MP for Oldham West and Royton
54. Anna McMorrin, MP for Cardiff North
55. Ed Miliband, former Labour Party leader and MP for Doncaster North
56. Jessica Morden, Opposition Whip and MP for Newport East
57. Stephen Morgan, MP for Portsmouth South
58. Matthew Pennycook, MP for Greenwich and Woolwich
59. Toby Perkins, MP for Chesterfield
60. Bridget Phillipson, MP for Houghton and Sunderland South
61. Luke Pollard, MP for Plymouth Sutton & Devonport
62. Steve Reed, shadow children and families minister and MP for Croydon North
63. Christina Rees, shadow Wales secretary and MP for Neath
64. Ellie Reeves, MP for Lewisham West and Penge
65. Jonathan Reynolds, shadow economic secretary to the Treasury and MP for Stalybridge and Hyde
66. Marie Rimmer, MP for St Helens South and Whiston
67. Virendra Sharma, MP for Ealing Southall
68. Barry Sheerman, MP for Huddersfield
69. Tulip Siddiq, MP for Hampstead and Kilburn
70. Andy Slaughter, MP for Hammersmith
71. Jeff Smith, MP for Manchester Withington
72. Nick Smith, Opposition Whip and MP for Blaenau Gwent
73. Karin Smyth, MP for Bristol South
74. Jo Stevens, MP for Cardiff Central
75. Mark Tami, Opposition Whip and MP for Alyn and Deeside
76. Nick Thomas-Symonds, shadow solicitor general for England and Wales, shadow secretary of state for security and MP for Torfaen
77. Stephen Timms, MP for East Ham
78. Karl Turner, MP for Kingston upon Hull East
79. Valerie Vaz, shadow leader of the House of Commons and MP for Walsall South
80. Alan Whitehead, shadow energy minister and MP for Southampton Test
81. Mohammad Yasin, MP for Bedford
82. Daniel Zeichner, MP for Cambridge

=== Members of the European Parliament ===
1. Richard Corbett, MEP for Yorkshire and the Humber
2. Neena Gill, MEP for West Midlands
3. Theresa Griffin, MEP for North West England
4. Jackie Jones, MEP for Wales
5. Claude Moraes, MEP for London
6. Rory Palmer, MEP for East Midlands

=== Constituency Labour Parties ===
1. Aberdeen Central CLP
2. Aberdeen Donside CLP
3. Aberdeen South and North Kincardine CLP
4. Aberdeenshire West CLP
5. Airdrie and Shotts CLP
6. Aldershot CLP
7. Aldridge-Brownhills CLP
8. Altrincham and Sale West CLP
9. Alyn and Deeside CLP
10. Amber Valley CLP
11. Angus South CLP
12. Argyll and Bute CLP
13. Aylesbury CLP
14. Ayr CLP
15. Banbury CLP
16. Banffshire and Buchan Coast CLP
17. Barking CLP
18. Barrow and Furness CLP
19. Basildon and Billericay CLP
20. Basingstoke CLP
21. Batley and Spen CLP
22. Beaconsfield CLP
23. Beckenham CLP
24. Bedford CLP
25. Bethnal Green and Bow CLP
26. Beverley and Holderness CLP
27. Bexleyheath and Crayford CLP
28. Birmingham Edgbaston CLP
29. Birmingham Erdington CLP
30. Birmingham Ladywood CLP
31. Birmingham Perry Barr CLP
32. Birmingham Selly Oak CLP
33. Blackburn CLP
34. Blaenau Gwent CLP
35. Blaydon CLP
36. Bolton North East CLP
37. Bosworth CLP
38. Bracknell CLP
39. Bradford South CLP
40. Braintree CLP
41. Brecon and Radnorshire CLP
42. Brent Central CLP
43. Brent North CLP
44. Brentford and Isleworth CLP
45. Bridgend CLP
46. Bridgwater and West Somerset CLP
47. Brigg and Goole CLP
48. Bristol East CLP
49. Bristol South CLP
50. Bromsgrove CLP
51. Buckingham CLP
52. Burton CLP
53. Bury St Edmunds CLP
54. Caerphilly CLP
55. Caithness, Sutherland and Ross CLP
56. Cambridge CLP
57. Cardiff Central CLP
58. Cardiff South and Penarth CLP
59. Cardiff West CLP
60. Carlisle CLP
61. Carrick, Cumnock and Doon Valley CLP
62. Carshalton and Wallington CLP
63. Castle Point CLP
64. Central Devon CLP
65. Central Suffolk and North Ipswich CLP
66. Cheadle CLP
67. Chelmsford CLP
68. Chelsea and Fulham CLP
69. Chesham and Amersham CLP
70. Chesterfield CLP
71. Chichester CLP
72. Chingford and Woodford Green CLP
73. Chipping Barnet CLP
74. Chorley CLP
75. Cities of London and Westminster CLP
76. City of Chester CLP
77. Clackmannanshire and Dunblane CLP
78. Clydebank and Milngavie CLP
79. Coatbridge and Chryston CLP
80. Colne Valley CLP
81. Corby CLP
82. Coventry North East CLP
83. Croydon Central CLP
84. Croydon North CLP
85. Cunninghame North CLP
86. Cunninghame South CLP
87. Cynon Valley CLP
88. Darlington CLP
89. Daventry CLP
90. Denton and Reddish CLP
91. Derby North CLP
92. Derby South CLP
93. Derbyshire Dales CLP
94. Devizes CLP
95. Dewsbury CLP
96. Doncaster Central CLP
97. Doncaster North CLP
98. Dover CLP
99. Dulwich and West Norwood CLP
100. Dumbarton CLP
101. Dumfriesshire CLP
102. Dunfermline CLP
103. Dwyfor Meirionnydd CLP
104. Ealing Central and Acton CLP
105. Ealing North CLP
106. East Devon CLP
107. East Ham CLP
108. East Hampshire CLP
109. East Kilbride CLP
110. East Lothian CLP
111. East Surrey CLP
112. East Worthing and Shoreham CLP
113. East Yorkshire CLP
114. Eastwood CLP
115. Eddisbury CLP
116. Edinburgh Eastern CLP
117. Edinburgh North and Leith CLP
118. Edinburgh Pentlands CLP
119. Edinburgh West CLP
120. Eltham CLP
121. Enfield Southgate CLP
122. Epping Forest CLP
123. Epsom and Ewell CLP
124. Exeter CLP
125. Falkirk West CLP
126. Fareham CLP
127. Feltham and Heston CLP
128. Finchley and Golders Green CLP
129. Filton and Bradley Stoke CLP
130. Galloway and West Dumfries CLP
131. Garston and Halewood CLP
132. Gedling CLP
133. Gillingham and Rainham CLP
134. Glasgow Anniesland CLP
135. Glasgow Cathcart CLP
136. Glasgow Maryhill and Springburn CLP
137. Glasgow Pollok CLP
138. Glasgow Provan CLP
139. Glasgow Shettleston CLP
140. Glasgow Southside CLP
141. Gower CLP
142. Grantham and Stamford CLP
143. Gravesham CLP
144. Great Yarmouth CLP
145. Greenock and Inverclyde CLP
146. Greenwich and Woolwich CLP
147. Halesowen and Rowley Regis CLP
148. Halifax CLP
149. Haltemprice and Howden CLP
150. Hamilton, Larkhall and Stonehouse CLP
151. Hammersmith CLP
152. Hampstead and Kilburn CLP
153. Harlow CLP
154. Harrogate and Knaresborough CLP
155. Harrow West CLP
156. Hartlepool CLP
157. Harwich and North Essex CLP
158. Havant CLP
159. Hemel Hempstead CLP
160. Hendon CLP
161. Henley CLP
162. Hertford and Stortford CLP
163. Hertsmere CLP
164. Hexham CLP
165. High Peak CLP
166. Hitchin and Harpenden CLP
167. Holborn and St Pancras CLP
168. Hornchurch and Upminster CLP
169. Hornsey and Wood Green CLP
170. Houghton and Sunderland South CLP
171. Hove CLP
172. Huddersfield CLP
173. Hyndburn CLP
174. Ilford North CLP
175. Ilford South CLP
176. Inverness and Nairn CLP
177. Ipswich CLP
178. Isle of Wight CLP
179. Islington North CLP
180. Islwyn CLP
181. Jarrow CLP
182. Keighley CLP
183. Kenilworth and Southam CLP
184. Kirkcaldy CLP
185. Labour International CLP
186. Leeds North East CLP
187. Leeds North West CLP
188. Leeds West CLP
189. Leicester East CLP
190. Leicester South CLP
191. Leigh CLP
192. Lewes CLP
193. Lewisham East CLP
194. Lewisham West and Penge CLP
195. Lichfield CLP
196. Linlithgow CLP
197. Loughborough CLP
198. Luton South CLP
199. Macclesfield CLP
200. Maidenhead CLP
201. Maidstone and the Weald CLP
202. Manchester Withington CLP
203. Meriden CLP
204. Merthyr Tydfil and Rhymney CLP
205. Mid Bedfordshire CLP
206. Mid Derbyshire CLP
207. Mid Fife and Glenrothes CLP
208. Mid Norfolk CLP
209. Mid Worcestershire CLP
210. Middlesbrough South and East Cleveland CLP
211. Midlothian South, Tweeddale and Lauderdale CLP
212. Milton Keynes CLP
213. Milton Keynes South CLP
214. Mole Valley CLP
215. Monmouth CLP
216. Moray CLP
217. Motherwell and Wishaw CLP
218. Na h-Eileanan an Iar CLP
219. Neath CLP
220. New Forest West CLP
221. Newcastle upon Tyne Central CLP
222. Newcastle upon Tyne East CLP
223. Newcastle upon Tyne North CLP
224. Newport East CLP
225. Newport West CLP
226. Normanton, Pontefract and Castleford CLP
227. North Durham CLP
228. North East Bedfordshire CLP
229. North East Derbyshire CLP
230. North East Fife CLP
231. North East Hampshire CLP
232. North East Hertfordshire CLP
233. North East Somerset CLP
234. North Herefordshire
235. North Norfolk CLP
236. North Shropshire CLP
237. North Somerset CLP
238. North Swindon CLP
239. North Tyneside CLP
240. North West Hampshire CLP
241. North West Norfolk CLP
242. North Wiltshire CLP
243. Norwich South CLP
244. Nottingham South CLP
245. Nuneaton CLP
246. Old Bexley and Sidcup CLP
247. Oldham East and Saddleworth CLP
248. Oldham West and Royton CLP
249. Orpington CLP
250. Oxford East CLP
251. Oxford West and Abingdon CLP
252. Paisley CLP
253. Penistone and Stocksbridge CLP
254. Peterborough CLP
255. Plymouth Sutton and Devonport CLP
256. Pontypridd CLP
257. Poplar and Limehouse CLP
258. Portsmouth North CLP
259. Portsmouth South CLP
260. Preseli Pembrokeshire CLP
261. Pudsey CLP
262. Putney CLP
263. Rayleigh and Wickford CLP
264. Reading East CLP
265. Reading West CLP
266. Redditch CLP
267. Renfrewshire North and West CLP
268. Renfrewshire South CLP
269. Rhondda CLP
270. Ribble Valley CLP
271. Richmond Park CLP
272. Richmond (Yorks) CLP
273. Rochdale CLP
274. Rochester and Strood CLP
275. Rochford and Southend East CLP
276. Romsey and Southampton North CLP
277. Rossendale and Darwen CLP
278. Runnymede and Weybridge CLP
279. Rutherglen CLP
280. Rutland and Melton CLP
281. Salisbury CLP
282. Saffron Walden CLP
283. Scarborough and Whitby CLP
284. Scunthorpe CLP
285. Selby and Ainsty CLP
286. Sevenoaks CLP
287. Sheffield Central CLP
288. Sheffield Hallam CLP
289. Sheffield South East CLP
290. Shipley CLP
291. Shrewsbury and Atcham CLP
292. Sittingbourne and Sheppey CLP
293. Skipton and Ripon CLP
294. Skye, Lochaber and Badenoch CLP
295. Sleaford and North Hykeham CLP
296. Solihull CLP
297. Somerford and Frome CLP
298. South Cambridgeshire CLP
299. South Dorset CLP
300. South East Cornwall CLP
301. South Leicestershire CLP
302. South Northamptonshire CLP
303. South Shields CLP
304. South Staffordshire CLP
305. South Suffolk CLP
306. South Swindon CLP
307. South West Norfolk CLP
308. South West Surrey CLP
309. South West Wiltshire CLP
310. Southampton Test CLP
311. Spelthorne CLP
312. St Albans CLP
313. St Helens North CLP
314. Stafford CLP
315. Stalybridge and Hyde CLP
316. Stevenage CLP
317. Stirling CLP
318. Stockton North CLP
319. Stoke-on-Trent South CLP
320. Stone CLP
321. Stourbridge CLP
322. Strathkelvin and Bearsden CLP
323. Stratford-on-Avon CLP
324. Streatham CLP
325. Stroud CLP
326. Suffolk Coastal CLP
327. Sunderland Central CLP
328. Sutton Coldfield CLP
329. Swansea East CLP
330. Swansea West CLP
331. Tamworth CLP
332. Tatton CLP
333. Taunton Deane CLP
334. Telford CLP
335. Tewkesbury CLP
336. The Cotswolds CLP
337. Thirsk and Malton CLP
338. Thurrock CLP
339. Tiverton and Honiton CLP
340. Tonbridge and Malling CLP
341. Torbay CLP
342. Torfaen CLP
343. Truro and Falmouth CLP
344. Tunbridge Wells CLP
345. Twickenham CLP
346. Tynemouth CLP
347. Vale of Clwyd CLP
348. Walsall North CLP
349. Wantage CLP
350. Warrington South CLP
351. Warwick and Leamington CLP
352. Washington and Sunderland West CLP
353. Watford CLP
354. Waveney CLP
355. Wealden CLP
356. Welwyn Hatfield CLP
357. Wentworth and Dearne CLP
358. West Bromwich East CLP
359. West Worcestershire CLP
360. Westminster North CLP
361. Wimbledon CLP
362. Winchester CLP
363. Witham CLP
364. Witney CLP
365. Woking CLP
366. Wolverhampton South East CLP
367. Worcester CLP
368. Workington CLP
369. Wrekin CLP
370. Wrexham CLP
371. Wyre and Preston North CLP
372. Wyre Forest CLP
373. Ynys Môn CLP
374. York Central CLP

=== Affiliated trades unions ===
1. Community
2. Musicians' Union (MU)
3. Transport Salaried Staffs' Association (TSSA)
4. Union of Shop, Distributive and Allied Workers (USDAW)
5. Unison

=== Socialist societies ===
1. BAME Labour
2. Christians on the Left
3. Labour Business
4. Labour Campaign for International Development
5. Labour Housing Group
6. Labour Movement for Europe (LME)
7. Labour Party Irish Society
8. Scientists for Labour
9. Socialist Environment and Resources Association (SERA)
10. Socialist Health Association
11. Society of Labour Lawyers

== Emily Thornberry (eliminated) ==
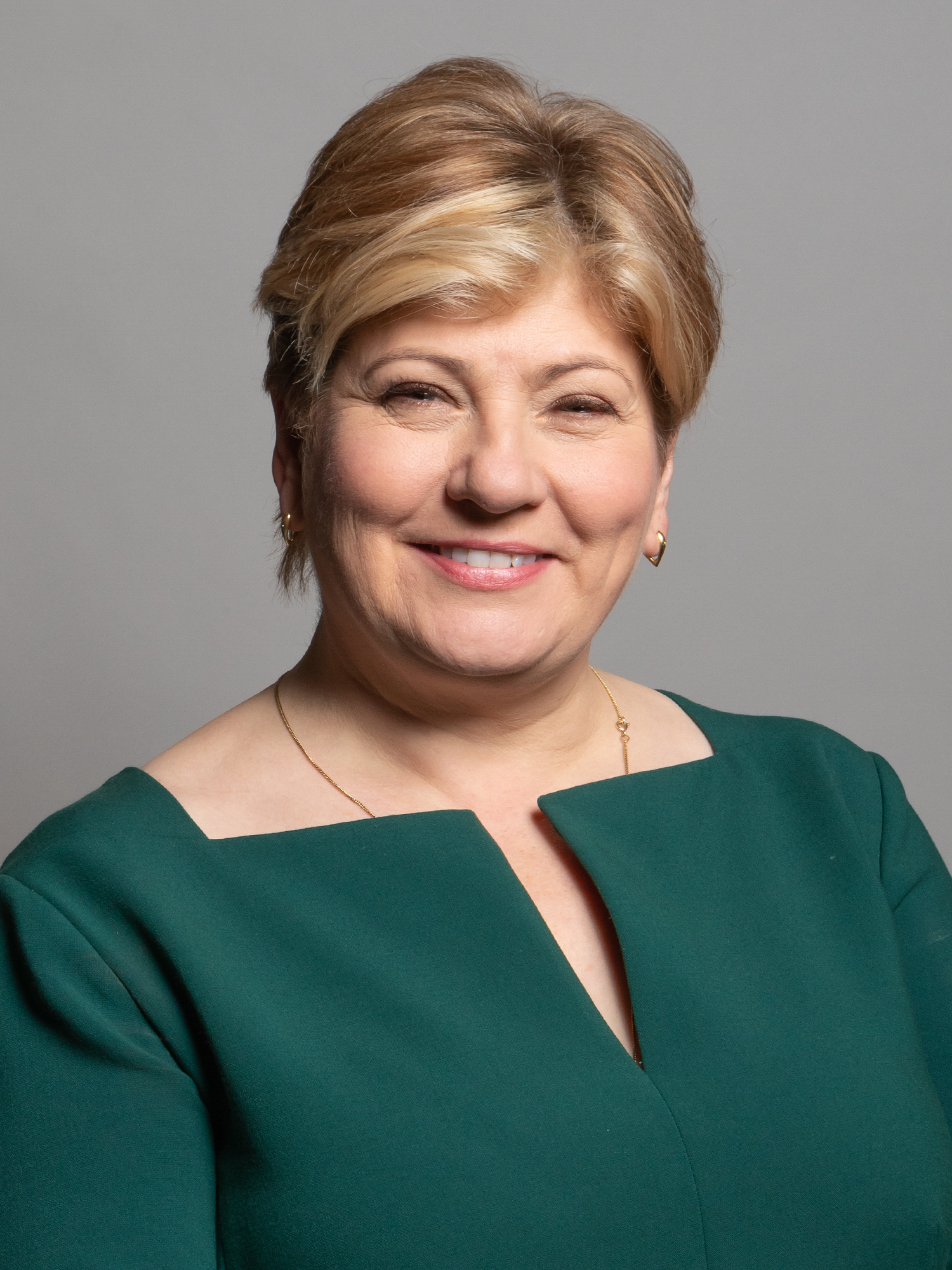
Emily Thornberry

=== Members of Parliament ===
1. Dawn Butler, MP for Brent Central and shadow secretary of state for women and equalities
2. Alex Davies-Jones, MP for Pontypridd
3. Nia Griffith, shadow defence secretary and MP for Llanelli
4. Fabian Hamilton, shadow foreign minister and MP for Leeds North East
5. Meg Hillier, MP for Hackney South and Shoreditch
6. Gerald Jones, shadow defence minister and MP for Merthyr Tydfil and Rhymney
7. Afzal Khan, MP for Manchester Gorton
8. Khalid Mahmood, MP for Birmingham Perry Barr and shadow minister of state for Europe
9. Rachael Maskell, MP for York Central (initially nominated Clive Lewis)
10. James Murray, MP for Ealing North
11. Charlotte Nichols, MP for Warrington North
12. Chi Onwurah, MP for Newcastle upon Tyne Central and shadow minister for industrial strategy
13. Yasmin Qureshi, MP for Bolton South East
14. Matt Rodda, MP for Reading East
15. Naz Shah, MP for Bradford West
16. Alex Sobel, MP for Leeds North West
17. Gareth Thomas, MP for Harrow West
18. Emily Thornberry (self)
19. Liz Twist, MP for Blaydon
20. Catherine West, MP for Hornsey and Wood Green
21. Matt Western, MP for Warwick and Leamington
22. Nadia Whittome, MP for Nottingham East (initially nominated Clive Lewis)

=== Members of the European Parliament ===
1. Julie Ward, MEP for North West England (initially nominated Clive Lewis)

=== Constituency Labour Parties ===
1. Arfon CLP
2. Bishop Auckland CLP
3. Brentwood and Ongar CLP
4. Broadland CLP
5. Canterbury CLP
6. Cardiff North CLP
7. Carmarthen West and South Pembrokeshire CLP
8. Cowdenbeath CLP
9. Eastleigh CLP
10. Esher and Walton CLP
11. Ettrick, Roxburgh and Berwickshire CLP
12. Falkirk East CLP
13. Forest of Dean CLP
14. Gateshead CLP
15. Guildford CLP
16. Horsham CLP
17. Islington South and Finsbury CLP
18. Northern Ireland LP
19. Midlothian North and Musselburgh CLP
20. Newbury CLP
21. North Cornwall CLP
22. Reigate CLP
23. Rugby CLP
24. Rushcliffe CLP
25. St Ives CLP
26. South Ribble CLP
27. Southport CLP
28. Surrey Heath CLP
29. Totnes CLP
30. Vale of Glamorgan CLP
31. West Lancashire CLP

== Jess Phillips (withdrawn) ==
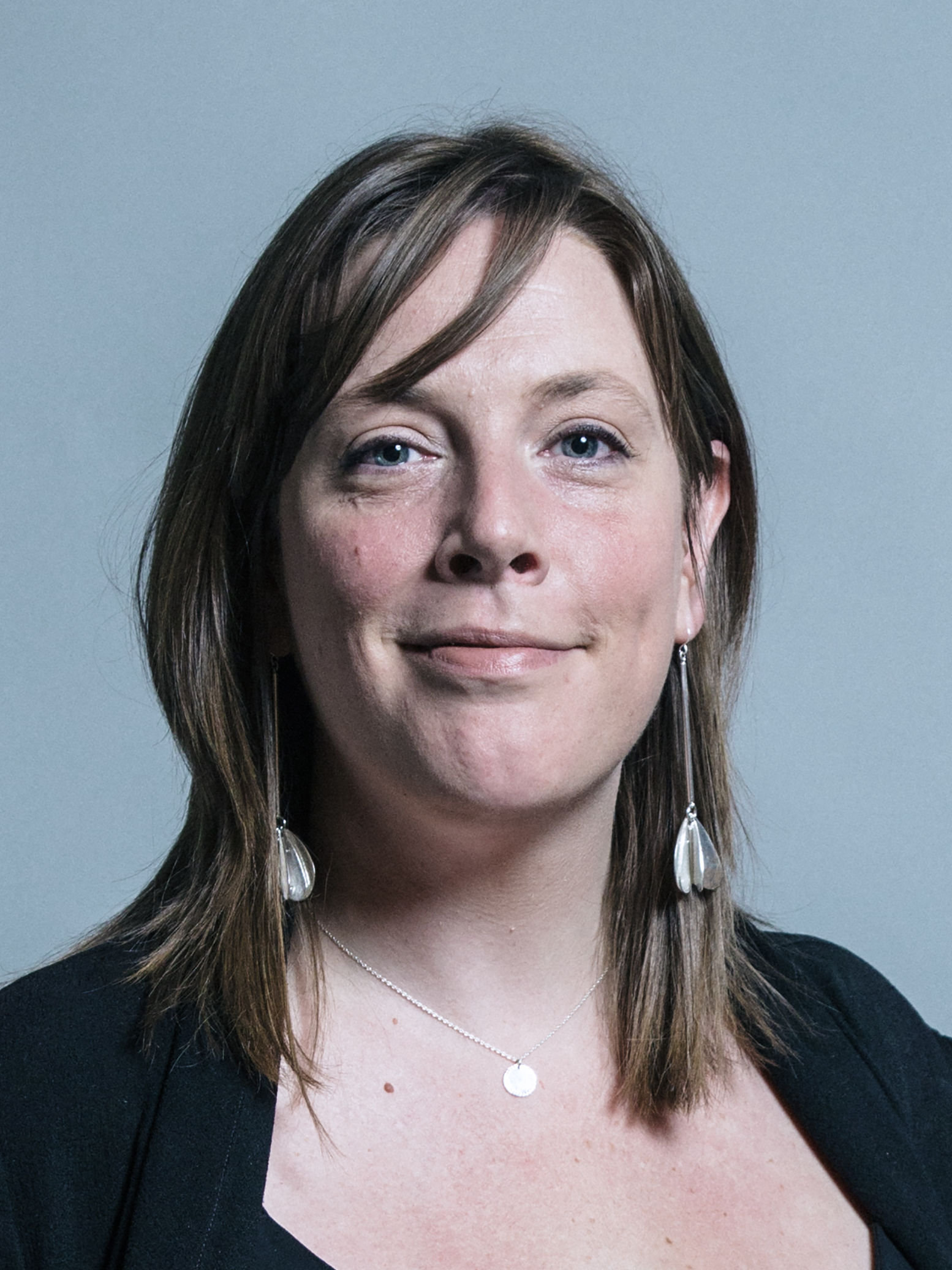
Jess Phillips

=== Members of Parliament ===
1. Tonia Antoniazzi, MP for Gower
2. Chris Bryant, MP for Rhondda
3. Liam Byrne, shadow digital minister and MP for Birmingham Hodge Hill
4. Ruth Cadbury, MP for Brentford and Isleworth
5. Neil Coyle, MP for Bermondsey and Old Southwark
6. Rosie Duffield, MP for Canterbury
7. Julie Elliott, MP for Sunderland Central
8. Colleen Fletcher, Opposition Whip and MP for Coventry North East
9. Margaret Hodge, MP for Barking
10. Darren Jones, MP for Bristol North West
11. Liz Kendall, MP for Leicester West
12. Peter Kyle, MP for Hove
13. Holly Lynch, MP for Halifax
14. Siobhain McDonagh, MP for Mitcham and Morden
15. Pat McFadden, MP for Wolverhampton South East
16. Alison McGovern, MP for Wirral South
17. Catherine McKinnell, MP for Newcastle upon Tyne North
18. Ian Murray, MP for Edinburgh South
19. Jess Phillips (self)
20. Rachel Reeves, MP for Leeds West
21. Wes Streeting, MP for Ilford North

=== Members of the European Parliament ===
1. Seb Dance, MEP for London
2. John Howarth, MEP for South East England

== Clive Lewis (withdrawn) ==
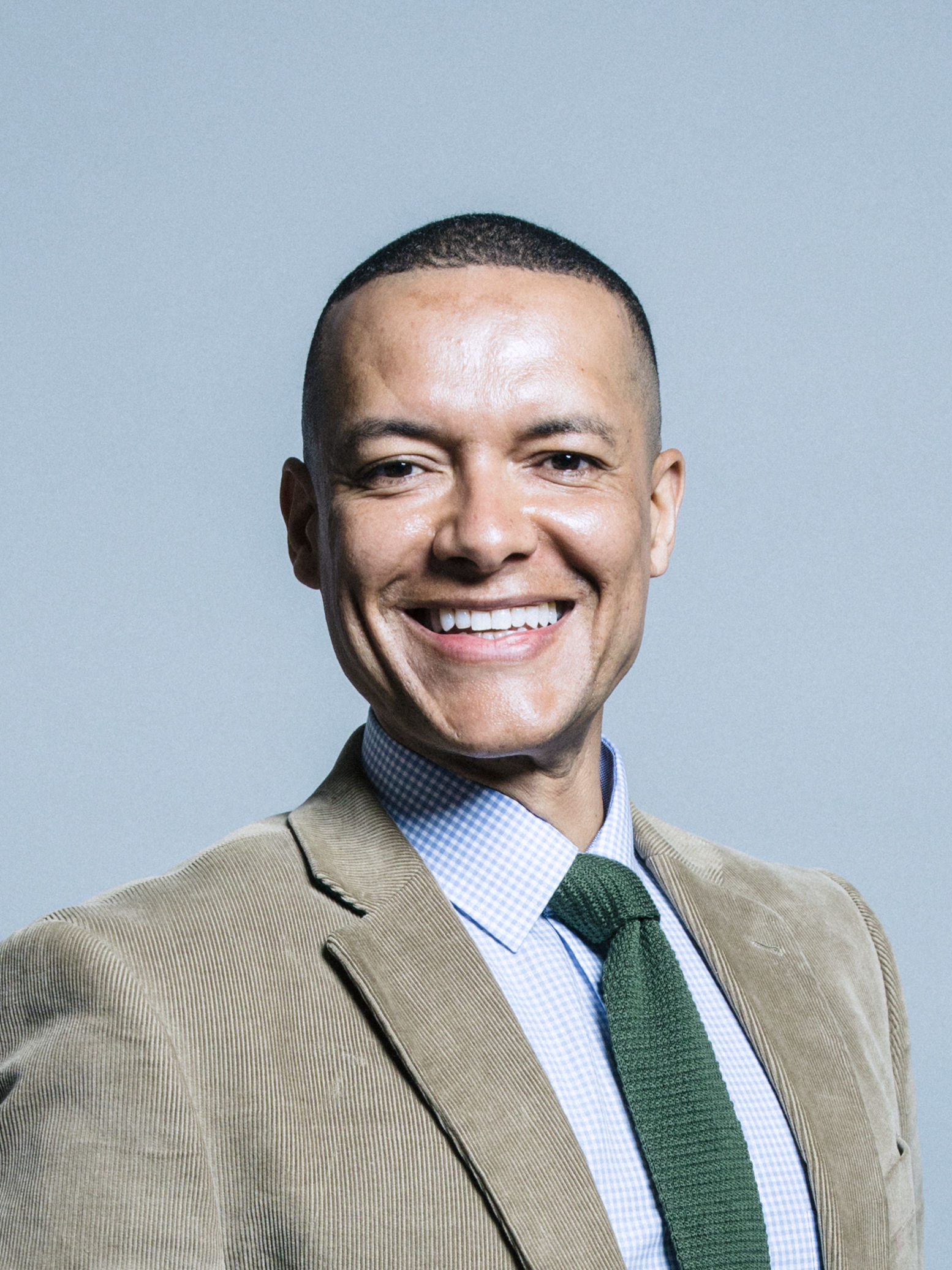
Clive Lewis

=== Members of Parliament ===
1. Clive Lewis (self)
2. Rachael Maskell, shadow employment rights secretary and MP for York Central (subsequently nominated Emily Thornberry)
3. Lloyd Russell-Moyle, MP for Brighton Kemptown (subsequently nominated Rebecca Long-Bailey)
4. Nadia Whittome, MP for Nottingham East (subsequently nominated Emily Thornberry)

=== Members of the European Parliament ===
1. Julie Ward, MEP for North West England (subsequently nominated Emily Thornberry)

== See also ==
- Nominations in the 2020 Labour Party deputy leadership election
