= Nominations in the 2020 Labour Party deputy leadership election =

The following list shows all Labour Party Members of Parliament (MPs), Members of the European Parliament (MEPs), Constituency Labour Parties (CLPs), affiliated trades unions and socialist societies that nominated a candidate in the 2020 Labour Party deputy leadership election.

== Rosena Allin-Khan ==
=== Parliamentary nominations ===
Members of Parliament
- Rosena Allin-Khan (self)
- Fleur Anderson, MP for Putney
- Ben Bradshaw, MP for Exeter
- Kevin Brennan, Shadow Minister for Arts and Heritage and MP for Cardiff West
- Geraint Davies, MP for Swansea West
- Thangam Debbonaire, MP for Bristol West
- Rosie Duffield, MP for Canterbury
- Clive Efford, MP for Eltham
- Vicky Foxcroft, MP for Lewisham Deptford
- Fabian Hamilton, Shadow Minister of State for Peace and Disarmament and MP for Leeds North East
- Stephen Kinnock, MP for Aberavon
- Khalid Mahmood, MP for Birmingham Perry Barr
- Anna McMorrin, MP for Cardiff North
- Chi Onwurah, Shadow Minister for Industrial Strategy and MP for Newcastle upon Tyne Central
- Luke Pollard, MP for Plymouth Sutton and Devonport
- Nick Smith, MP for Blaenau Gwent
- Alex Sobel, MP for Leeds North East
- Wes Streeting, MP for Ilford North
Members of the European Parliament
- Richard Corbett, Leader of the European Parliamentary Labour Party and MEP for Yorkshire and the Humber
- Seb Dance, Deputy Leader of the European Parliamentary Labour Party and MEP for London
- John Howarth, MEP for South East England
- Jackie Jones, MEP for Wales
- Rory Palmer, MEP for East Midlands

=== CLP and affiliate nominations ===
Constituency Labour Parties
- Arfon CLP
- Arundel and South Downs CLP
- Aylesbury CLP
- Basildon and Billericay CLP
- Bishop Auckland CLP
- Brecon and Radnorshire CLP
- Brentwood and Ongar CLP
- Brighton Kemptown CLP
- Broxbourne CLP
- Buckingham CLP
- Cardiff West CLP
- Carlisle CLP
- Chelsea and Fulham CLP
- Cheltenham CLP
- Daventry CLP
- Dudley South CLP
- East Devon CLP
- East Worthing and Shoreham CLP
- Eastbourne CLP
- Eltham CLP
- Exeter CLP
- Finchley and Golders Green CLP
- Gloucester CLP
- Great Grimsby CLP
- Hendon CLP
- Hornchurch and Upminster CLP
- Louth and Horncastle
- Luton South CLP
- Manchester Gorton CLP
- Monmouth CLP
- Newbury CLP
- Newcastle upon Tyne Central CLP
- North Wiltshire CLP
- Plymouth Sutton and Devonport CLP
- Putney CLP
- Rayleigh and Wickford CLP
- Reading West CLP
- Richmond (Yorks) CLP
- Romsey and Southampton North CLP
- Ruislip, Northwood and Pinner CLP
- Runnymede and Weybridge CLP
- Scunthorpe CLP
- Sittingbourne and Sheppey CLP
- Somerton and Frome CLP
- Stroud CLP
- Suffolk Coastal CLP
- Tooting CLP
- Twickenham CLP
- Vale of Glamorgan CLP
- Vauxhall CLP
- Watford CLP
- Wimbledon CLP
- Wokingham CLP
- Wycombe CLP
- York Central CLP
- York Outer CLP
Socialist societies
- Scientists for Labour

== Richard Burgon ==
=== Parliamentary nominations ===
Members of Parliament
- Diane Abbott, Shadow Home Secretary and MP for Hackney North and Stoke Newington
- Apsana Begum, MP for Poplar and Limehouse
- Richard Burgon (self)
- Ian Byrne, MP for Liverpool West Derby
- Dan Carden, Shadow Secretary of State for International Development and MP for Liverpool Walton
- Mary Foy, MP for City of Durham
- Rachel Hopkins, MP for Luton South
- Imran Hussain, MP for Bradford East
- Ian Lavery, Chair of the Labour Party and MP for Wansbeck
- Andy McDonald, Shadow Secretary of State for Transport and MP for Middlesbrough
- John McDonnell, Shadow Chancellor and MP for Hayes and Harlington
- Ian Mearns, MP for Gateshead
- Grahame Morris, MP for Easington
- Kate Osborne, MP for Jarrow
- Yasmin Qureshi, Shadow Minister for Justice and MP for Bolton South East
- Bell Ribeiro-Addy, MP for Streatham
- Zarah Sultana, MP for Coventry South
- Jon Trickett, Shadow Lord President of the Council, Shadow Minister for the Cabinet Office and MP for Hemsworth
- Claudia Webbe, MP for Leicester East
- Beth Winter, MP for Cynon Valley
- Mohammad Yasin, MP for Bedford
Members of the European Parliament
- Claude Moraes, MEP for London

=== CLP and affiliate nominations ===
Constituency Labour Parties
- Aberconwy CLP
- Almond Valley CLP
- Bermondsey and Old Southwark CLP
- Sedgefield CLP
- Birkenhead CLP
- Birmingham Hall Green CLP
- Birmingham Hodge Hill CLP
- Blyth Valley CLP
- Bootle CLP
- Bournemouth East CLP
- Bournemouth West CLP
- Bury St Edmunds CLP
- Camborne and Redruth CLP
- Carmarthen East and Dinefwr CLP
- Ceredigion CLP
- Cities of London and Westminster CLP
- Clacton CLP
- Clwyd South CLP
- Coatbridge and Chryston CLP
- Colne Valley CLP
- Crawley CLP
- Dartford CLP
- Don Valley CLP
- Dudley North CLP
- Dundee City East CLP
- Dundee City West CLP
- Ealing Southall CLP
- Easington CLP
- East Ham CLP
- Ellesmere Port and Neston CLP
- Elmet and Rothwell CLP
- Enfield North CLP
- Folkestone and Hythe CLP
- Gainsborough CLP
- Harrow East CLP
- Hemsworth CLP
- Kensington CLP
- Kilmarnock and Irvine Valley CLP
- Kingswood CLP
- Leeds Central CLP
- Leeds East CLP
- Leeds North East CLP
- Leyton and Wanstead CLP
- Liverpool Walton CLP
- Liverpool Wavertree CLP
- Ludlow CLP
- Maldon CLP
- Mansfield CLP
- Mid Sussex CLP
- Montgomeryshire CLP
- New Forest East CLP
- Newton Abbot CLP
- North Devon CLP
- North West Durham CLP
- Norwich North CLP
- Nottingham East CLP
- Orkney CLP
- Penrith and the Border CLP
- Peterborough CLP
- Redcar CLP
- Rotherham CLP
- Scarborough and Whitby CLP
- Sedgefield CLP
- South Thanet CLP
- Stafford CLP
- St Austell and Newquay CLP
- Tottenham CLP
- Uddingston and Bellshill CLP
- Uxbridge and South Ruislip CLP
- Wallasey CLP
- Warley CLP
- Weaver Vale CLP
- West Bromwich West CLP
- Wolverhampton South West CLP
Trades unions
- BFAWU
- Fire Brigades Union
- Socialist Educational Association
- Unite the Union

== Dawn Butler ==
=== Parliamentary nominations ===
Members of Parliament
- Lyn Brown, Shadow Exchequer Secretary to the Treasury and MP for West Ham
- Dawn Butler (self)
- Liam Byrne, Shadow Minister for Digital and MP for Birmingham Hodge Hill
- Rosie Cooper, MP for West Lancashire
- Janet Daby, MP for Lewisham East
- Marsha de Cordova, Shadow Disabled People Minister and MP for Battersea
- Florence Eshalomi, MP for Vauxhall
- Barry Gardiner, Shadow Secretary of State for International Trade and MP for Brent North
- Preet Gill, Shadow Minister for International Development and MP for Dulwich and West Norwood
- Helen Hayes, MP for Dulwich and West Norwood
- Sharon Hodgson, Shadow Minister for Public Health and MP for Washington and Sunderland West
- Rupa Huq, MP for Ealing Central and Acton
- Sarah Jones, Shadow Minister of State for Housing and Planning and MP for Croydon Central
- Seema Malhotra, MP for Feltham and Heston
- Rachael Maskell, Shadow Employment Rights Secretary and MP for York Central
- Alison McGovern, MP for Wirral South
- James Murray, MP for Ealing North
- Abena Oppong-Asare, MP for Erith and Thamesmead
- Taiwo Owatemi, MP for Coventry North West
- Naz Shah, Shadow Diversity Minister and MP for Bradford West
- Karin Smyth, MP for Bristol South
- Stephen Timms, MP for East Ham (originally nominated Mahmood)
- Catherine West, MP for Hornsey and Wood Green
- Matt Western, MP for Warwick and Leamington
- Nadia Whittome, MP for Nottingham East
Members of the European Parliament
- Neena Gill, MEP for West Midlands
- Julie Ward, MEP for North West England

=== CLP and affiliate nominations ===
Constituency Labour Parties
- Aldridge-Brownhills CLP
- Battersea CLP
- Beverley and Holderness CLP
- Bexhill and Battle CLP
- Birmingham Erdington CLP
- Brent Central CLP
- Brent North CLP
- Bridgwater and West Somerset CLP
- Brighton Pavilion CLP
- Bristol South CLP
- Bristol West CLP
- Broxtowe CLP
- Carmarthen West and South Pembrokeshire CLP
- Central Devon CLP
- Chatham and Aylesford CLP
- Chelmsford CLP
- Chesham and Amersham CLP
- Chingford and Woodford Green CLP
- Chipping Barnet CLP
- Cleethorpes CLP
- Colchester CLP
- Devizes CLP
- Dulwich and West Norwood CLP
- Ealing Central and Acton CLP
- East Hampshire CLP
- Eastleigh CLP
- Edinburgh Central CLP
- Edinburgh Northern and Leith CLP
- Edmonton CLP
- Erith and Thamesmead CLP
- Esher and Walton CLP
- Filton and Bradley Stoke CLP
- Forest of Dean CLP
- Fylde CLP
- Guildford CLP
- Hastings and Rye CLP
- Hexham CLP
- Horsham CLP
- Kenilworth and Southam CLP
- Lancaster and Fleetwood CLP
- Leicester East CLP
- Lincoln CLP
- Liverpool Riverside CLP
- Luton North CLP
- Maidenhead CLP
- Mid Dorset and North Poole CLP
- Mid Worcestershire CLP
- Milton Keynes North CLP
- Morecambe and Lunesdale CLP
- Newark CLP
- North East Cambridgeshire CLP
- North East Hampshire CLP
- North Herefordshire CLP
- North Thanet CLP
- North West Norfolk CLP
- Northern Ireland CLP
- Preseli Pembrokeshire CLP
- Romford CLP
- Rushcliffe CLP
- Sevenoaks CLP
- South Derbyshire CLP
- South Suffolk CLP
- South West Wiltshire CLP
- Spelthorne CLP
- St Ives CLP
- Stevenage CLP
- Stoke-on-Trent Central CLP
- Streatham CLP
- Sutton and Cheam CLP
- Tonbridge and Malling CLP
- Totnes CLP
- Walthamstow CLP
- Wantage CLP
- Warwick and Leamington CLP
- West Dorset CLP
- West Ham CLP
- West Suffolk CLP
- Weston-super-Mare CLP
- Windsor CLP
- Wirral West CLP

== Ian Murray ==
=== Parliamentary nominations ===
Members of Parliament
- Tonia Antoniazzi, MP for Gower
- Clive Betts, MP for Sheffield South East
- Nick Brown, Opposition Chief Whip and MP for Newcastle upon Tyne East
- Chris Bryant, MP for Rhondda
- Ruth Cadbury, MP for Brentford and Isleworth
- Sarah Champion, MP for Rotherham
- Neil Coyle, MP for Bermondsey and Old Southwark
- Stella Creasy, MP for Walthamstow
- Alex Cunningham, Shadow Housing Minister and MP for Stockton North
- Wayne David, MP for Caerphilly
- Alex Davies-Jones, MP for Pontypridd
- Julie Elliott, MP for Sunderland Central
- Chris Elmore, MP for Ogmore
- Chris Evans, MP for Islwyn
- Mary Glindon, MP for North Tyneside
- Nia Griffith, Shadow Defence Secretary and MP for Llanelli
- John Healey, Shadow Housing Secretary and MP for Wentworth and Dearne
- Mark Hendrick, MP for Preston (originally nominated Mahmood)
- Margaret Hodge, MP for Barking
- Darren Jones, MP for Bristol North West
- Kevan Jones, MP for North Durham
- Liz Kendall, MP for Leicester West
- Peter Kyle, MP for Hove
- Holly Lynch, MP for Halifax
- Kerry McCarthy, MP for Bristol East
- Siobhain McDonagh, MP for Mitcham and Morden
- Pat McFadden, MP for Wolverhampton South East
- Catherine McKinnell, MP for Newcastle upon Tyne North
- Ian Murray (self)
- Toby Perkins, MP for Chesterfield
- Bridget Phillipson, MP for Houghton and Sunderland South
- John Spellar, MP for Warley
- Gareth Thomas, MP for Harrow West
- Derek Twigg, MP for Halton

=== CLP and affiliate nominations ===
Constituency Labour Parties
- Aberdeen Central CLP
- Aberdeen Donside CLP
- Aberdeen South and North Kincardine CLP
- Airdrie and Shotts CLP
- Angus South CLP
- Ayr CLP
- Barking CLP
- Caithness, Sutherland and Ross CLP
- Carrick, Cumnock and Doon Valley CLP
- Clackmannanshire and Dunblane CLP
- Croydon South CLP
- Cumbernauld and Kilsyth CLP
- Cunninghame North CLP
- Delyn CLP
- Dumbarton CLP
- Dumfries CLP
- Dunfermline CLP
- East Kilbride CLP
- East Lothian CLP
- Eastwood CLP
- Edinburgh Pentlands CLP
- Edinburgh Southern CLP
- Galloway and West Dumfries CLP
- Glasgow Anniesland CLP
- Glasgow Cathart CLP
- Glasgow Pollok CLP
- Glasgow Provan CLP
- Glasgow Shettleston CLP
- Glasgow Southside CLP
- Gower CLP
- Greenock and Inverclyde CLP
- Halifax CLP
- Halton CLP
- Hamilton, Larkhall and Stonehouse CLP
- Houghton and Sunderland South CLP
- Ilford North CLP
- Inverness and Nairn CLP
- Islwyn CLP
- Linlithgow CLP
- Midlothian South, Tweeddale and Lauderdale CLP
- Mitcham and Morden CLP
- Moray CLP
- Newcastle upon Tyne North CLP
- North Durham CLP
- Paisley CLP
- Perthshire North CLP
- Perthshire South and Kinross-shire CLP
- Renfrewshire North and West CLP
- Renfrewshire South CLP
- Sheffield South East CLP
- Skye, Lochaber and Badenoch CLP
- Stirling CLP
- Stockton North CLP
- Strathkelvin and Bearsden CLP
- Sunderland Central CLP
- Surrey Heath CLP
- Tynemouth CLP
- Wolverhampton South East CLP
- Wrexham CLP
Socialist societies
- Labour Movement for Europe

== Angela Rayner ==
=== Parliamentary nominations ===
Members of Parliament
- Debbie Abrahams, MP for Oldham East and Saddleworth
- Tahir Ali, MP for Birmingham Hall Green
- Mike Amesbury, Shadow Minister for Employment and MP for Weaver Vale
- Jonathan Ashworth, Shadow Health Secretary and MP for Leicester South
- Paula Barker, MP for Liverpool Wavertree
- Hilary Benn, MP for Leeds Central
- Olivia Blake, MP for Sheffield Hallam
- Paul Blomfield, MP for Sheffield Central
- Tracy Brabin, Shadow Culture Secretary and MP for Batley and Spen
- Karen Buck, MP for Westminster North
- Bambos Charalambous, MP for Enfield Southgate
- Feryal Clark, MP for Enfield North
- Jon Cruddas, MP for Dagenham and Rainham
- Judith Cummins, Shadow Minister for International Trade and MP for Bradford South
- Tanmanjeet Singh Dhesi, Parliamentary Private Secretary to the Leader of the Opposition and MP for Slough
- Anneliese Dodds, MP for Oxford East
- Stephen Doughty, MP for Cardiff South and Penarth
- Peter Dowd, Shadow Chief Secretary to the Treasury and MP for Bootle
- Jack Dromey, Shadow Pensions Minister and MP for Birmingham Erdington
- Angela Eagle, MP for Wallasey
- Maria Eagle, MP for Garston and Halewood
- Bill Esterson, MP for Sefton Central
- Colleen Fletcher, MP for Coventry North East
- Gill Furniss, Shadow Minister for Steel, Postal Affairs, and Consumer Protection and MP for Sheffield Brightside and Hillsborough
- Kate Green, MP for Stretford and Urmston
- Lilian Greenwood, MP for Nottingham South
- Margaret Greenwood, Shadow Secretary of State for Work and Pensions and MP for Wirral West
- Andrew Gwynne, Shadow Communities Secretary and MP for Denton and Reddish
- Louise Haigh, Shadow Policing Minister and MP for Sheffield Heeley
- Emma Hardy, MP for Kingston upon Hull West and Hessle
- Mike Hill, MP for Hartlepool
- Meg Hillier, MP for Hackney South and Shoreditch
- George Howarth, MP for Knowsley
- Dan Jarvis, Mayor of Sheffield City Region and MP for Barnsley Central
- Kim Johnson, MP for Liverpool Riverside
- Gerald Jones, MP for Merthyr Tydfil and Rhymney
- Ruth Jones, MP for Newport West
- Mike Kane, MP for Wythenshawe and Sale East
- Barbara Keeley, Shadow Minister for Mental Health and Social Care and MP for Worsley and Eccles South
- Afzal Khan, Shadow Immigration Minister and MP for Manchester Gorton
- David Lammy, MP for Tottenham
- Emma Lewell-Buck, MP for South Shields
- Tony Lloyd, Shadow Scotland Secretary, Shadow Northern Ireland Secretary and MP for Rochdale
- Rebecca Long-Bailey, Shadow Business Secretary and MP for Salford and Eccles
- Justin Madders, MP for Ellesmere Port and Neston
- Chris Matheson, Shadow Minister for Cabinet Office and MP for City of Chester
- Steve McCabe, MP for Birmingham Selly Oak
- Conor McGinn, MP for St Helens North
- Jim McMahon, Shadow Local Government Minister and MP for Oldham West and Royton
- Ed Miliband, MP for Doncaster North
- Nav Mishra, MP for Stockport
- Jessica Morden, MP for Newport East
- Stephen Morgan, MP for Portsmouth South
- Charlotte Nichols, MP for Warrington North
- Alex Norris, MP for Nottingham North
- Sarah Owen, MP for Luton North
- Stephanie Peacock, MP for Barnsley East
- Matthew Pennycook, MP for Greenwich and Woolwich
- Lucy Powell, MP for Manchester Central and former Shadow Education Secretary
- Angela Rayner (self)
- Steve Reed, MP for Croydon North
- Christina Rees, Shadow Secretary of State for Wales and MP for Neath
- Ellie Reeves, MP for Lewisham West and Penge
- Rachel Reeves, MP for Leeds West
- Jonathan Reynolds, Shadow Economic Secretary to the Treasury and MP for Stalybridge and Hyde
- Marie Rimmer, MP for St Helens South and Whiston
- Lloyd Russell-Moyle, MP for Brighton Kemptown
- Virendra Sharma, MP for Ealing Southall
- Barry Sheerman, MP for Huddersfield
- Tulip Siddiq, MP for Hampstead and Kilburn
- Andy Slaughter, MP for Hammersmith
- Cat Smith, Shadow Deputy Leader of the House of Commons, Shadow Minister for Voter Engagement and Youth Affairs and MP for Lancaster and Fleetwood
- Jo Stevens, MP for Cardiff Central
- Mark Tami, MP for Alyn and Deeside
- Sam Tarry, MP for Ilford South
- Nick Thomas-Symonds, Shadow Solicitor General for England and Wales, Shadow Minister of State for Security and MP for Torfaen
- Karl Turner, MP for Kingston upon Hull East
- Liz Twist, MP for Blaydon
- Valerie Vaz, MP for Walsall South
- Alan Whitehead, MP for Southampton Test
- Mick Whitley, MP for Birkenhead
- Daniel Zeichner, MP for Cambridge
Members of the European Parliament
- Theresa Griffin, Chair of the European Parliamentary Labour Party and MEP for North West England
- Jude Kirton-Darling, MEP for North East England

=== CLP and affiliate nominations ===
Constituency Labour Parties
- Aberavon CLP
- Aberdeenshire West CLP
- Aldershot CLP
- Altrincham and Sale West CLP
- Alyn and Deeside CLP
- Amber Valley CLP
- Angus North and Mearns CLP
- Argyll and Bute CLP
- Ashfield CLP
- Ashford CLP
- Ashdon-under-Lyne CLP
- Banbury CLP
- Banffshire and Buchan Coast CLP
- Barnsley Central CLP
- Barnsley East CLP
- Barrow and Furness CLP
- Basingstoke CLP
- Bassetlaw CLP
- Bath CLP
- Batley and Spen CLP
- Beaconsfield CLP
- Beckenham CLP
- Bedford CLP
- Bethnal Green and Bow CLP
- Bexleyheath and Crayford CLP
- Blaenau Gwent CLP
- Blaenau Gwent CLP
- Birmingham Northfield CLP
- Birmingham Perry Barr CLP
- Birmingham Selly Oak CLP
- Birmingham Yardley CLP
- Blackburn CLP
- Blackley and Broughton CLP
- Blackpool North and Cleveleys CLP
- Blackpool South CLP
- Blaenau Gwent CLP
- Blaydon CLP
- Bognor Regis and Littlehampton CLP
- Bolsover CLP
- Bolton North East CLP
- Bolton South East CLP
- Bolton West CLP
- Boston and Skegness CLP
- Bosworth CLP
- Bracknell CLP
- Bradford South CLP
- Braintree CLP
- Brentford and Isleworth CLP
- Bridgend CLP
- Brigg and Goole CLP
- Bristol East CLP
- Bristol North West CLP
- Broadland CLP
- Bromley and Chislehurst CLP
- Bromsgrove CLP
- Burnley CLP
- Burton CLP
- Bury North CLP
- Bury South CLP
- Caerphilly CLP
- Calder Valley CLP
- Camberwell and Peckham CLP
- Cambridge CLP
- Cannock Chase CLP
- Canterbury CLP
- Cardiff Central CLP
- Cardiff North CLP
- Cardiff South and Penarth CLP
- Carshalton and Wallington CLP
- Castle Point CLP
- Central Suffolk and North Ipswich CLP
- Charnwood CLP
- Cheadle CLP
- Chesterfield CLP
- Chichester CLP
- Chippenham CLP
- Chorley CLP
- Christchurch CLP
- City of Chester CLP
- City of Durham CLP
- Clwyd West CLP
- Clydebank and Milngavie CLP
- Congleton CLP
- Copeland CLP
- Corby CLP
- Coventry North East CLP
- Coventry North West CLP
- Coventry South CLP
- Cowdenbeath CLP
- Crewe and Nantwich CLP
- Croydon Central CLP
- Croydon North CLP
- Cunninghame South CLP
- Cynon Valley CLP
- Dagenham and Rainham CLP
- Darlington CLP
- Denton and Reddish CLP
- Derby North CLP
- Derby South CLP
- Derbyshire Dales CLP
- Dewsbury CLP
- Doncaster Central CLP
- Doncaster North CLP
- Dover CLP
- Dwyfor Meirionnydd CLP
- Ealing North CLP
- East Surrey CLP
- East Yorkshire CLP
- Eddisbury CLP
- Edinburgh Eastern CLP
- Edinburgh Western CLP
- Enfield Southgate CLP
- Epping Forest CLP
- Epsom and Ewell CLP
- Erewash CLP
- Ettrick, Roxburgh and Berwickshire CLP
- Falkirk East CLP
- Falkirk West CLP
- Fareham CLP
- Faversham and Mid Kent CLP
- Feltham and Heston CLP
- Garston and Halewood CLP
- Gateshead CLP
- Gedling CLP
- Gillingham and Rainham CLP
- Glasgow Maryhill and Springburn CLP
- Gosport CLP
- Grantham and Stamford CLP
- Gravesham CLP
- Great Yarmouth CLP
- Greenwich and Woolwich CLP
- Hackney North and Stoke Newington CLP
- Hackney South and Shoreditch CLP
- Halesowen and Rowley Regis CLP
- Haltemprice and Howden CLP
- Hammersmith CLP
- Hampstead and Kilburn CLP
- Harborough CLP
- Harlow CLP
- Harrogate and Knaresborough CLP
- Harrow West CLP
- Hartlepool CLP
- Harwich and North Essex CLP
- Havant CLP
- Hazel Grove CLP
- Hemel Hempstead CLP
- Henley CLP
- Hereford and South Herefordshire CLP
- Hertsmere CLP
- Heywood and Middleton CLP
- High Peak CLP
- Hitchin and Harpenden CLP
- Holborn and St Pancras CLP
- Hornsey and Wood Green CLP
- Hove CLP
- Huddersfield CLP
- Huntingdon CLP
- Hyndburn CLP
- Ilford South CLP
- Ipswich CLP
- Isle of Wight CLP
- Islington North CLP
- Islington South and Finsbury CLP
- Jarrow CLP
- Keighley CLP
- Kingston and Surbiton CLP
- Kingston upon Hull East CLP
- Kingston upon Hull North CLP
- Kingston upon Hull West and Hessle CLP
- Knowsley CLP
- Labour International CLP
- Leeds North West CLP
- Leeds West CLP
- Leicester South CLP
- Leicester West CLP
- Leigh CLP
- Lewes CLP
- Lewisham Deptford CLP
- Lewisham East CLP
- Lewisham West and Penge CLP
- Lichfield CLP
- Liverpool West Derby CLP
- Llanelli CLP
- Loughborough CLP
- Macclesfield CLP
- Maidstone and the Weald CLP
- Makerfield CLP
- Manchester Central CLP
- Manchester Withington CLP
- Meon Valley CLP
- Meriden CLP
- Merthyr Tydfil and Rhymney CLP
- Mid Bedfordshire CLP
- Mid Derbyshire CLP
- Mid Fife and Glenrothes CLP
- Mid Norfolk CLP
- Middlesbrough CLP
- Middlesbrough South and East Cleveland CLP
- Midlothian North and Musselburgh CLP
- Milton Keynes South CLP
- Mole Valley CLP
- Morley and Outwood CLP
- Motherwell and Wishaw CLP
- Na h-Eileanan an Iar CLP
- Neath CLP
- New Forest West CLP
- Newcastle-under-Lyme CLP
- Newcastle upon Tyne East CLP
- Newport East CLP
- Newport West CLP
- Normanton, Pontefract and Castleford CLP
- North Cornwall CLP
- North Dorset CLP
- North East Bedfordshire CLP
- North East Derbyshire CLP
- North East Fife CLP
- North East Hertfordshire CLP
- North East Somerset CLP
- North Norfolk CLP
- North Shropshire CLP
- North Somerset CLP
- North Swindon CLP
- North Tyneside CLP
- North Warwickshire CLP
- North West Cambridgeshire CLP
- North West Hampshire CLP
- North West Leicestershire CLP
- Northampton North CLP
- Northampton South CLP
- Norwich South CLP
- Nottingham North CLP
- Nottingham South CLP
- Nuneaton CLP
- Old Bexley and Sidcup CLP
- Oldham East and Saddleworth CLP
- Oldham West and Royton CLP
- Orpington CLP
- Slough CLP
- Oxford East CLP
- Oxford West and Abingdon CLP
- Pendle CLP
- Penistone and Stocksbridge CLP
- Plymouth Moor View CLP
- Pontypridd CLP
- Poole CLP
- Poplar and Limehouse CLP
- Portsmouth North CLP
- Portsmouth South CLP
- Preston CLP
- Pudsey CLP
- Reading East CLP
- Redditch CLP
- Reigate CLP
- Rhondda CLP
- Ribble Valley CLP
- Richmond Park CLP
- Rochdale CLP
- Rochester and Strood CLP
- Rochford and Southend East CLP
- Rossendale and Darwen CLP
- Rother Valley CLP
- Rugby CLP
- Rutland and Melton CLP
- Saffron Walden CLP
- Salford and Eccles CLP
- Salisbury CLP
- Sefton Central CLP
- Selby and Ainsty CLP
- Sheffield Brightside and Hillsborough CLP
- Sheffield Central CLP
- Sheffield Hallam CLP
- Sheffield Heeley CLP
- Sherwood CLP
- Shetland CLP
- Shipley CLP
- Shrewsbury and Atcham CLP
- Skipton and Ripon CLP
- Sleaford and North Hykeham CLP
- Slough CLP
- Solihull CLP
- South Basildon and East Thurrock CLP
- South Cambridgeshire CLP
- South Dorset CLP
- South East Cornwall CLP
- South Holland and the Deepings CLP
- South Leicestershire CLP
- South Northamptonshire CLP
- South Ribble CLP
- South Shields CLP
- South Swindon CLP
- South West Bedfordshire CLP
- South West Devon CLP
- South West Hertfordshire CLP
- South West Norfolk CLP
- South West Surrey CLP
- Southampton Itchen CLP
- Southampton Test CLP
- Southend West CLP
- Southport CLP
- St Albans CLP
- St Helens North CLP
- St Helens South and Whiston CLP
- Staffordshire Moorlands CLP
- Stalybridge and Hyde CLP
- Stockport CLP
- Stockton South CLP
- Stoke-on-Trent North CLP
- Stoke-on-Trent South CLP
- Stone CLP
- Stourbridge CLP
- Stratford-on-Avon CLP
- Stretford and Urmston CLP
- Sutton Coldfield CLP
- Swansea East CLP
- Swansea West CLP
- Tamworth CLP
- Tatton CLP
- Taunton Deane CLP
- Telford CLP
- Tewkesbury CLP
- The Cotswolds CLP
- The Wrekin CLP
- Thirsk and Malton CLP
- Thornbury and Yate CLP
- Thurrock CLP
- Tiverton and Honiton CLP
- Torbay CLP
- Torfaen CLP
- Torridge and West Devon CLP
- Truro and Falmouth CLP
- Tunbridge Wells CLP
- Vale of Clwyd CLP
- Wakefield CLP
- Walsall North CLP
- Wansbeck CLP
- Wansbeck CLP
- Wansbeck CLP
- Waveney CLP
- Waveney CLP
- Wealden CLP
- Wellingborough CLP
- Wells CLP
- Welwyn Hatfield CLP
- Wentworth and Dearne CLP
- West Bromwich East CLP
- West Lancashire CLP
- West Worcestershire CLP
- Westminster North CLP
- Westmorland and Lonsdale CLP
- Wigan CLP
- Winchester CLP
- Wirral South CLP
- Witham CLP
- Witney CLP
- Woking CLP
- Wolverhampton North East CLP
- Worcester CLP
- Workington CLP
- Worsley and Eccles South CLP
- Worthing West CLP
- Wyre and Preston North CLP
- Wyre Forest CLP
- Wythenshawe and Sale East CLP
- Yeovil CLP
- Ynys Môn CLP
Trade unions and affiliates
- Unison
- NUM
- USDAW
- GMB
- Community
- Christians on the Left
- CWU
- ASLEF
- Labour Housing Group
- Society of Labour Lawyers
- Socialist Health Association
- TSSA

== Khalid Mahmood (withdrawn) ==
=== Parliamentary nominations ===
Members of Parliament
- Mark Hendrick, MP for Preston
- Khalid Mahmood (self)
- Stephen Timms, MP for East Ham

== See also ==
- Nominations in the 2020 Labour Party leadership election
