= Joseph Barcroft =

British physiologist (1872–1947)

Sir Joseph Barcroft CBE FRS
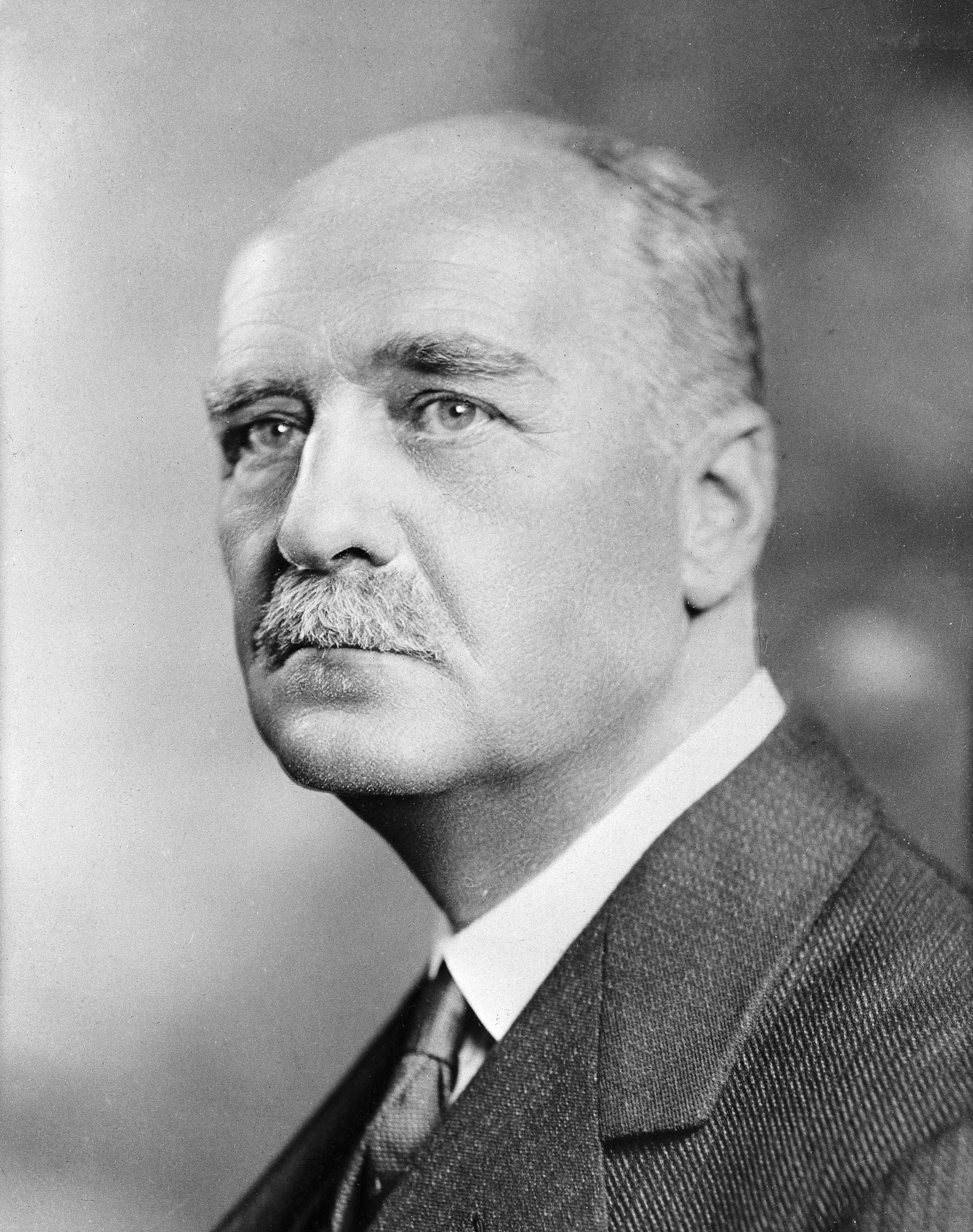
- Barcroft c. 1940
- Born: 26 July 1872; Newry, Northern Ireland
- Died: 21 March 1947 (aged 74)
- Spouse: Mary Agnetta Ball
- Scientific career
- Fields: Physiology
- Institutions: Cambridge University
- Doctoral students: Francis John Worsley Roughton

Sir Joseph Barcroft CBE FRS (26 July 1872 – 21 March 1947) was a British physiologist best known for his studies of the oxygenation of blood.

== Life ==
Born in Newry, County Down into a Quaker family, he was the son of Henry Barcroft DL and Anna Richardson Malcomson of The Glen, Newry – a property purchased for his parents by his mother's uncle, John Grubb Richardson and adjoining his own estate in Bessbrook. He was initially educated at Bootham School, York and later at The Leys School, Cambridge. He married Mary Agnetta Ball, daughter of Sir Robert S. Ball, in 1903.

He received his degree in Medicine and Science in 1896 from Cambridge University, and immediately began his studies of haemoglobin. In May 1910 he was elected a Fellow of the Royal Society and would be awarded their Royal Medal in 1922 and their Copley medal in 1943. He would also deliver their Croonian Lecture in 1935.

In both the First World War and Second World War he had the prestigious role of Chief Physiologist at the Gas Warfare Centre at Porton Down near Salisbury.

In 1936 he was nominated, unsuccessfully, by Professor Arthur Dighton Stammers, Professor of Physiology in the University of the Witwatersrand, for the Nobel Prize in Physiology or Medicine, for his work on the respiratory function of the blood and the functions of the spleen.

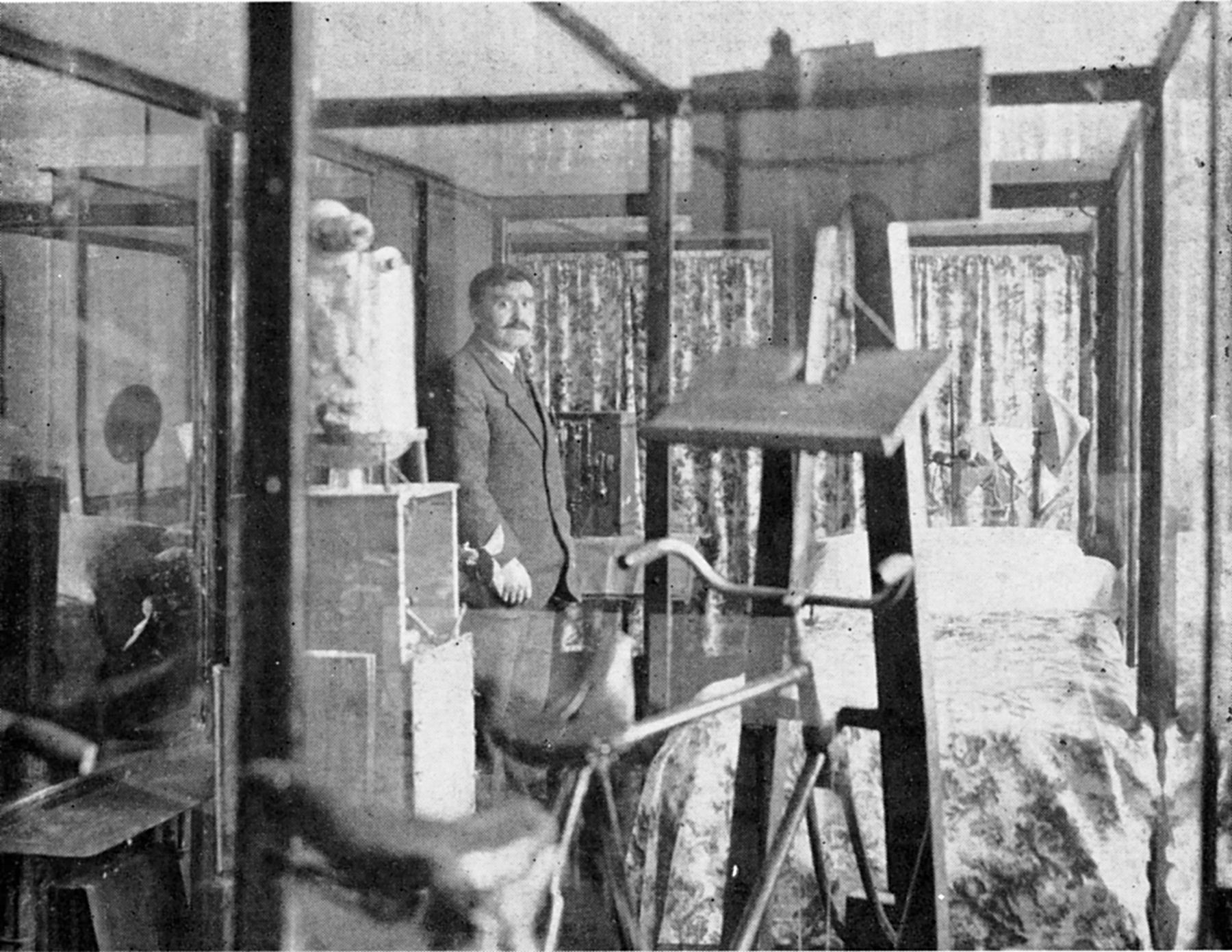
Glass chamber in which Barcroft exposed himself to increasingly low concentrations of oxygen over 6 days. A bed, cycle ergometer and other equipment can be seen. The man is Sergeant-Major Secker, who was Barcroft's longtime assistant.

In the course of his research, he did not hesitate to use himself as a test subject. For example, during the First World War, when he was called to Royal Engineers Experimental Station (near Salisbury) to carry out experiments on asphyxiating gas, he exposed himself to an atmosphere of poisonous hydrogen cyanide. On another occasion he remained for seven days in a glass chamber in order to calculate the minimum quantity of oxygen required for the survival of the human organism, and another time he exposed himself to such a low temperature that he collapsed into unconsciousness.

He also studied the physiology of oxygenation at extreme altitudes, and for this purpose he organized expeditions to the peak of Tenerife (1910), to Monte Rosa (1911), and to the Peruvian Andes (1922).

Between 1902 and 1905 he was a Governor of Leighton Park School, the Quaker School in Reading. From 1925 to 1937 he held the chair of physiology at Cambridge. His final research, begun in 1933, concerned fetal respiration.

He was appointed a Commander of the Order of the British Empire (CBE) in the 1918 Birthday Honours, and knighted in the 1935 Birthday Honours. He was elected a Foreign Honorary Member of the American Academy of Arts and Sciences in 1938.

During the first years of the Second World War he was again summoned to Porton Down to consult on chemical weapons. He died in Cambridge in 1947.

Mount Barcroft in California is named after him.

== Publications ==
- The Respiratory Function of the Blood (1914)
- Features in the Architecture of the Physiological Function (1934)

Academic offices
Preceded by Arthur Keith	Fullerian Professor of Physiology; 1924–1927	Succeeded by Julian Sorell Huxley
