= St Paul's High School, Bessbrook =

Coordinates: 54.185°N 6.390°W

St Paul's High School Ardscoil Naomh Pól
- Bessbrook, County Armagh; Northern Ireland

Information
- Type: Secondary school
- Motto: In caritate radicati ("In charity rooted")
- Religious affiliation: Catholic
- Established: 1966
- Chair of Governors: Eileen Fearon
- Principal: Mr. Dáithí Murray
- Chaplain: Séamus White
- Age: 11 to 19
- Enrolment: 1600
- Colours: Maroon, white
- Website: http://www.stpaulsbessbrook.org

St. Paul's High School, Bessbrook (Irish: Ardscoil Naomh Pól, An Sruthán) is an all-ability, co-educational English-Medium secondary school located on the outskirts of Bessbrook near Newry, County Armagh. It is a Catholic-maintained day school for boys and girls aged 11 to 19, with a pupil population of over 1550 (including a Learning Support Centre for pupils with special educational needs) and is one of Ireland's largest post-primary schools. The school is managed by the Council for Catholic Maintained Schools (CCMS) and the Education Authority (EA). St Paul's High School is a heavily over-subscribed school with an annual admissions number of under 300 pupils.

== Location ==
The school is situated on the main Newry to Camlough road (A25). The school was extensively rebuilt and refurbished with a £17 million grant from the Department of Education. The new school was officially opened on 25 January 2007 by Archbishop Seán Brady, Archbishop of Armagh, and Primate of All Ireland, on the feast day of The Conversion of St. Paul. The renovation of St. Paul's won the Construction of Excellence Award.

The President of Ireland, Mary McAleese, visited St Paul's on 9 November 2006 to mark the completion of the extensive renovation of the school. Former Principal Oliver Mooney, was named Northern Ireland Headteacher of the Year in the 2010 Teaching Awards. His last day at St. Paul's was 18 December 2013.

Armagh GAA footballer Jarlath Burns was appointed as Principal of St Paul's, effective 1 January 2014.

== Academics ==
The school was designated a Specialist College for Science, by the Department of Education in 2008, was awarded the BECTA ICT Mark, and became a Centre of Excellence for ICT in 2009. The Education and Training Inspectorate of the Department of Education carried out a Standard Inspection at St Paul's High School in January 2016 and reported that the school was 'outstanding' in all areas (Achievements and Standards, Provision for Learning and Leadership & Management).

In 2018, 57.4% of its entrants achieved five or more GCSEs at grades A* to C, including the core subjects English and Maths. Also in 2018, 64.6% of its entrants to the A-level exam achieved A*-C grades.

== Notable former pupils and staff ==
- Eamon Collins (1954–1999), author and Provisional IRA volunteer
- Dominic Bradley (born 1960), SDLP politician and MLA for Newry and Armagh (2003–2016); schoolteacher
- Jarlath Burns (born 1968), Armagh GAA captain; school principal
- Mairead McKinley (born 1970), actress
- Susan Lynch (born 1971), actress
- Conor McGinn (born 1984), Labour MP for St Helens North
