= Camlough =

Village in County Armagh, Northern Ireland

Coordinates: 54.1805°N 6.4109°W

Camlough: Irish: Camloch
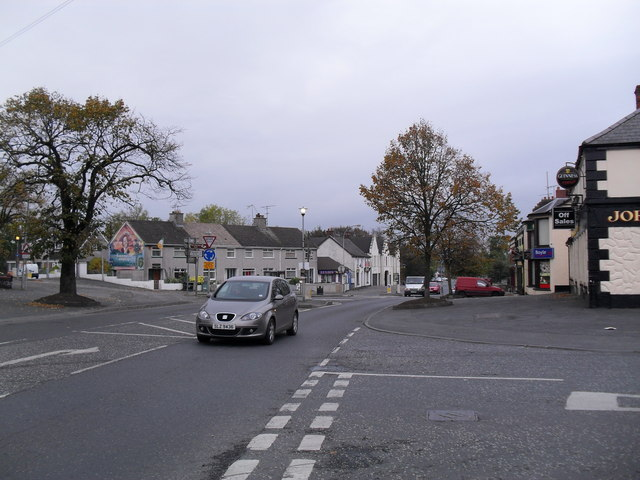
- Main Street, Camlough, 2009

- Location within Northern Ireland
- Population: 1,074 (2011 Census)
  - Belfast: 35 mi (56 km)
  - Dublin: 58 mi (93 km)
- District: Newry, Mourne and Down
- County: County Armagh
- Country: Northern Ireland
- Sovereign state: United Kingdom
- Post town: NEWRY
- Postcode district: BT35
- Dialling code: 028
- UK Parliament: Newry & Armagh
- NI Assembly: Newry & Armagh

Camlough (/ˈkæm.lɒx/ KAM-lokh; from Irish Camloch, meaning 'crooked lake') is a village west of Newry in County Armagh, Northern Ireland. The village is named after a lake, known as the Cam Lough. South of the village is Camlough Mountain (or Slieve Girkin), part of the Ring of Gullion which is an Area of Outstanding Natural Beauty. Camlough had a population of 1,074 at the 2011 census.

== History ==
Evidence of pre-Christian settlement in and around the village includes several dolmens (portal tombs) on Camlough Mountain. The Hag's Chair in Lislea and the Ballykeel Dolmen also indicate settlement in the area during the Neolithic period.

Camlough was an ecclesiastical district in the Barony of Upper Orior and was anciently part of the O'Hanlon's country. At the time of the Plantation of Ulster, 1000 acres of 12 townlands were granted to Henry McShane O'Neill and the village was developed during this period.

Camlough village is in the townland of Cross, referring not to a stone monument but to the village crossroads in the north of the townland. In 1620 Camlough Mountain was known as Sliabh na Croise, meaning "Mountain of the Cross".

=== Cam Lough ===
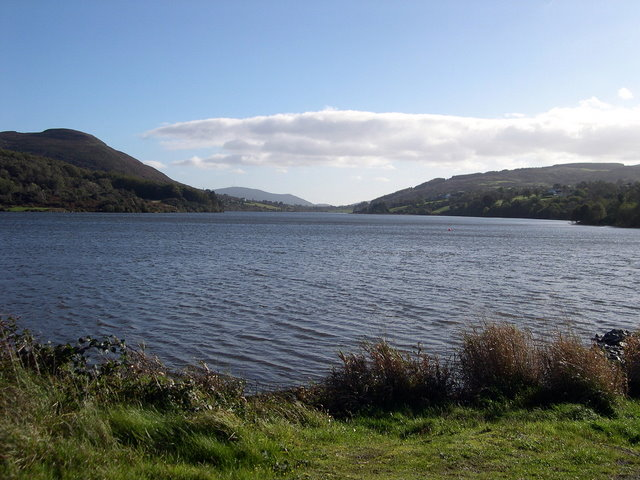
The Cam Lough

Camlough Lake was formed as a glacial ribbon lake, and takes its name from its irregular shape; although its modern form does not appear particularly crooked, its shape was much less regular in the past before its level was raised by the embankment built in the late 19th century. The glacial leftover sits in a valley carved between Slieve Gullion and Camlough Mountain and is today the largest lake in the Ring of Gullion.

Close to the shore of the lake is an approximately one kilometre long tunnel, wide enough to drive an articulated truck into, which was excavated in the 1960s as part of a planned development intended to create a man-made cavern within Camlough Mountain which was to have been used to store and release water to generate electricity. It was planned that the pumped hydro storage scheme, when operational, would generate more than 200 megawatts of electricity had it been completed; however, plans were shelved with the onset of the Troubles.

=== Camlough Mountain (Slieve Girkin) ===
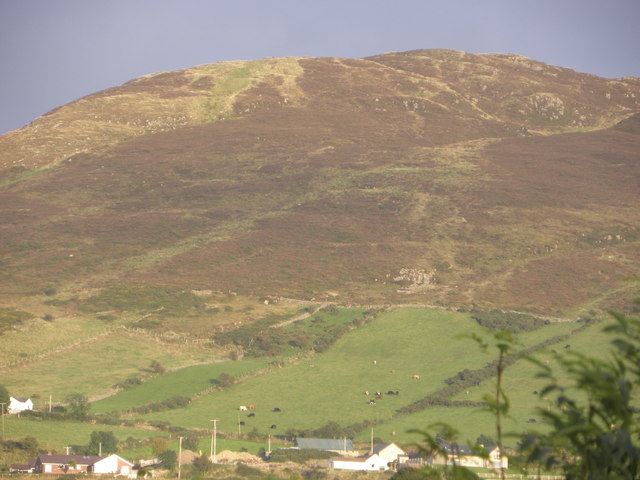
Camlough Mountain

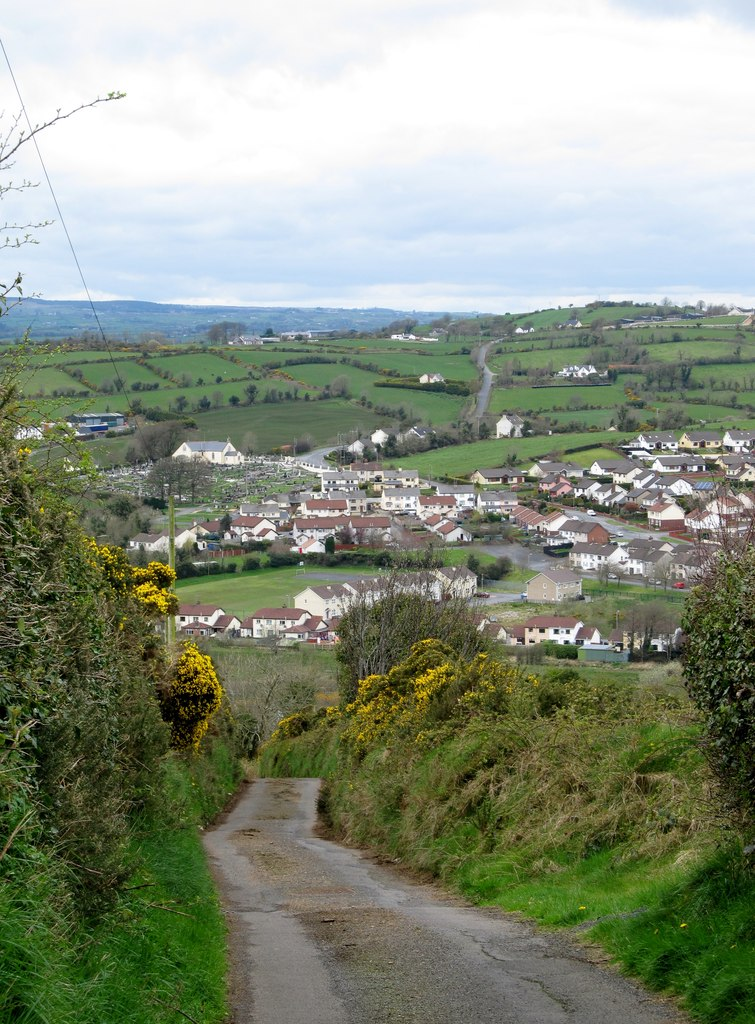
Camlough seen from the lower slopes of Camlough Mountain

To the south of Camlough is Camlough Mountain or Slieve Girkin (Irish: Sliabh gCuircín), rising to 423 metres (1,388 ft). The rock that makes up Camlough Mountain is called granodiorite. Granodiorite, just like the rocks that make up Slieve Gullion, forms from the cooling, deep underground, of molten magma. However, unlike the rocks that make up Slieve Gullion and the Ring of Gullion, which were formed around 60 million years ago, the granodiorites of Camlough Mountain are around 400 million years old. Whereas the younger rocks of Gullion are associated with igneous activity related to the formation of the present day Atlantic Ocean, the rocks of Camlough Mountain are associated with igneous activity related to the closure of a precursor to the present day Atlantic, the now long disappeared Iapetus Ocean.

=== Camlough National School ===
Camlough National School was built in 1836 and was located on the Quarter Road. It was divided into a boys' school and a girls' school. The classroom was heated by a pot-bellied stove in the centre of the room and pupils would have been sent to collect sticks for the fire.

=== Mass rock ===
A Mass rock (Carraig an Aifrinn), dating from the Penal era, is located in Camlough. It is situated in Grant's Rocks and is over 300 years old. In 2003, a special Mass was held at the Mass rock in memory of the people who suffered during Penal times.

St Malachy's Church, Carrickcruppen, is the oldest church building in the Parish of Lower Killeavy. It was built in 1816 and replaced an earlier church.

=== Kelly's Mill ===
Camlough River is a small meandering stream that makes its way from Camlough to the Newry Canal. It was once a vibrant fast flowing river, teeming with trout and the power source of approximately nine mills. The first of these mills was Kelly's Flax and Scutching Mill in Camlough village. It was situated to the rear of Carragher's house. Established around the mid-18th century, the mill comprised nine buildings, two of which were split level. It was powered by water from two ponds on either side of the Keggal Road.

=== Irish War of Independence ===
On the day of the 1918 general election, the Camlough Company of the Irish Volunteers travelled by train from Newry to Carlingford. On arrival, they found large numbers of Carlingford inhabitants wearing Union Jacks. The Volunteers ordered all the Royal Irish Constabulary men they saw on duty on the streets or at the polling booths to return to their barracks and to remain in them whilst the Volunteers were in Carlingford. A series of attacks were made on the Volunteers by mobs on the streets. The Volunteers took control and sought to protect voters going to record their votes until the polling booths closed. Seamus Lyang from Dundalk was polling clerk in Carlingford and when the booths closed the Volunteers had to take Lyang under their protection and escort him out of the Carlingford. All the pubs and shops in Carlingford were hostile to the Volunteers and refused to serve them. After the closing of the poll, the Volunteers marched back to Camlough.

During the Irish War of Independence, the Camlough Company of the Irish Republican Army were active in the area and were commanded by Frank Aiken (1898–1983). In December 1920, approximately 200 IRA volunteers, led by Aiken, attacked Camlough Royal Irish Constabulary barracks. They exchanged fire with the RIC, threw grenades and set fire to the building. British troops sent from Newry were ambushed by the IRA who opened fire and threw grenades from a bridge overhead. Three volunteers were fatally wounded. The next day, British forces set fire to several homes and businesses in Camlough in reprisal, many of them owned by Aiken's relatives.

=== The Troubles ===
Camlough is situated in South Armagh, which was the most militarised region in Western Europe during the Troubles. The region was a stronghold of support for the Provisional IRA, earning it the nickname 'Bandit Country' (see Provisional IRA South Armagh Brigade).

On 19 May 1981, five British soldiers were killed in an Irish Republican Army (IRA) landmine attack on the Chancellors Road 3 miles from Camlough. The soldiers had been travelling in a Saracen armoured personnel carrier when the bomb exploded. This attack was during the 1981 Irish hunger strike in Maze (HM Prison), and 3 miles from the home of one of the hunger strikers, Raymond McCreesh.

== Sports ==
Since breaking the Open Water Relay Guinness World Record, the lake has been used as a training ground for triathletes and open water swimmers. Local swimmer Padraig Mallon completed the English and North Channel in the same year (only the third person to do so). His sister, Colleen Mallon, went on to break the Irish record for crossing the North Channel in 2014 and Keith Garry completed the English Channel in 2014. The area has also produced two successful relay teams crossing the North Channel and world-class ice swimmers.

Camlough Rovers F.C. is the local football team, playing in the Mid-Ulster Football League.

Camloch has two Gaelic Athletic Association (GAA) clubs. Two of the GAA clubs in the village are Gaelic football clubs: St Patrick's Carrickcruppen GFC has won four Senior county championships; Shane O'Neill's GAC, a continuation of the first Camloch club (William O'Brien's, founded in 1888), has won two Senior and three Junior titles.

Craobh Rua Camloch hurling club was established in 1991 in the Camlough and Bessbrook areas of South Armagh. As hurling had not been played in the area in some 40 years, the club received some help from the Armagh GAA in setting up coaching courses for the children and their mentors. They play their home games at Dunster Park (An Dún Rua) on High Street, Derrymore. In 2010, the hurling club's Seniors reached the Junior Championship Final and subsequently made it to the semi-final of the Ulster championship. The Under 14s represented County Armagh in the All Ireland Feile in Ennis, where they reached the semi-final. Several Craobh Rua players have represented Armagh at senior inter-county level.

=== World record ===
A Guinness World Record for the longest open water relay swim was broken by a team of intrepid swimmers at Camlough Lake in South Armagh on Saturday 19 September 2009. The group beat the world record for a 'continuous long-distance relay swim' after embarking on the world beating attempt over a week before.

Two hundred swimmers from across Ireland took part in the challenge. The previous record was 480 km; Camlough set the record at 680 km.

== Places of interest ==
Ballykeel Dolmen and Cairn are south west of Camlough, at the western foot of Slieve Gullion. The dolmen is an example of a portal dolmen and is made up of two portal stones with a sill between, and a lower backstone supporting a huge capstone.

== Events ==
Feile Chamlocha is an annual festival held in Camlough in the summer months. It includes the Camlough Festival and the Crooked Lake Triathlon. The triathlon is held in June.

Camlough Lake Water Festival (or CLWF) is Irelands only outdoor/open-water swimming festival. It is held over a weekend in August. As well as introductory swimming events the lake also hosts the National 5k & 10k swims for Swim Ireland.

== Education ==
Schools in the area include St. Malachy's Primary School and St Paul's High School, Bessbrook.

== Demography ==
Camlough is classified as a Village by the Northern Ireland Statistics and Research Agency (NISRA) (i.e. with population between 1,000 and 2,499 people). On Census Day (27 March 2011) the usually resident population of Camlough Settlement was 1,074, accounting for 0.06% of the NI total. Of these:

- 25.33% were aged under 16 years and 8.66% were aged 65 and over;
- the median age was 31;
- 49.26% of the population were male and 50.74% were female;
- 97.30% were from a Catholic background and 1.68% were from a 'Protestant and Other Christian (including Christian related)' background

== Notable people ==
- Frank Aiken (1898–1983) – Chief of Staff of the Irish Republican Army during the Irish Civil War; founding member of Fianna Fáil; Tánaiste from 1965 to 1969
- Andrew Britton (1981–2008) – New York Times best-selling author
- Donn Byrne (1889–1928) – Irish-American poet and novelist
- Raymond McCreesh (1957–1981) – member of the Provisional IRA who died on hunger-strike in 1981
- Conor McGinn (born 1984) – Labour MP for St Helens North 2015–2024
- Conor Murphy (born 1963) – Sinn Féin Member of Parliament for Newry and Armagh 2005–2015
- Eugene O'Callaghan (1888–1973) – Roman Catholic Bishop of Clogher 1943–1969
- Tomás Cardinal Ó Fiaich (1923–1990) – Catholic Cardinal; Archbishop of Armagh and the Primate of All Ireland.
- Paddy Quinn (born 1952) – member of the Provisional IRA who took part in the 1981 Irish hunger strike.
