= Raymond McCreesh =

Provisional IRA volunteer (1957–1981)

- Born: 25 February 1957; Camlough, County Armagh, Northern Ireland
- Died: 21 May 1981 (aged 24); HM Prison Maze, Maze, County Down, Northern Ireland
- Cause of death: Hunger strike
- Organization: Provisional IRA
- Known for: Hunger strike of 61 days, from 22 March 1981

Raymond McCreesh (Irish: Réamonn Mac Raois, 25 February 1957 – 21 May 1981) was an Irish volunteer in the South Armagh Brigade of the Provisional Irish Republican Army (IRA). In 1976, he and two other IRA volunteers were captured while attempting to ambush a British Army observation post. McCreesh was one of the ten Irish republicans who died during the 1981 Irish hunger strike in the Maze Prison. McCreesh was one of 22 Irish republicans (in the 20th century) who died on hunger-strike.

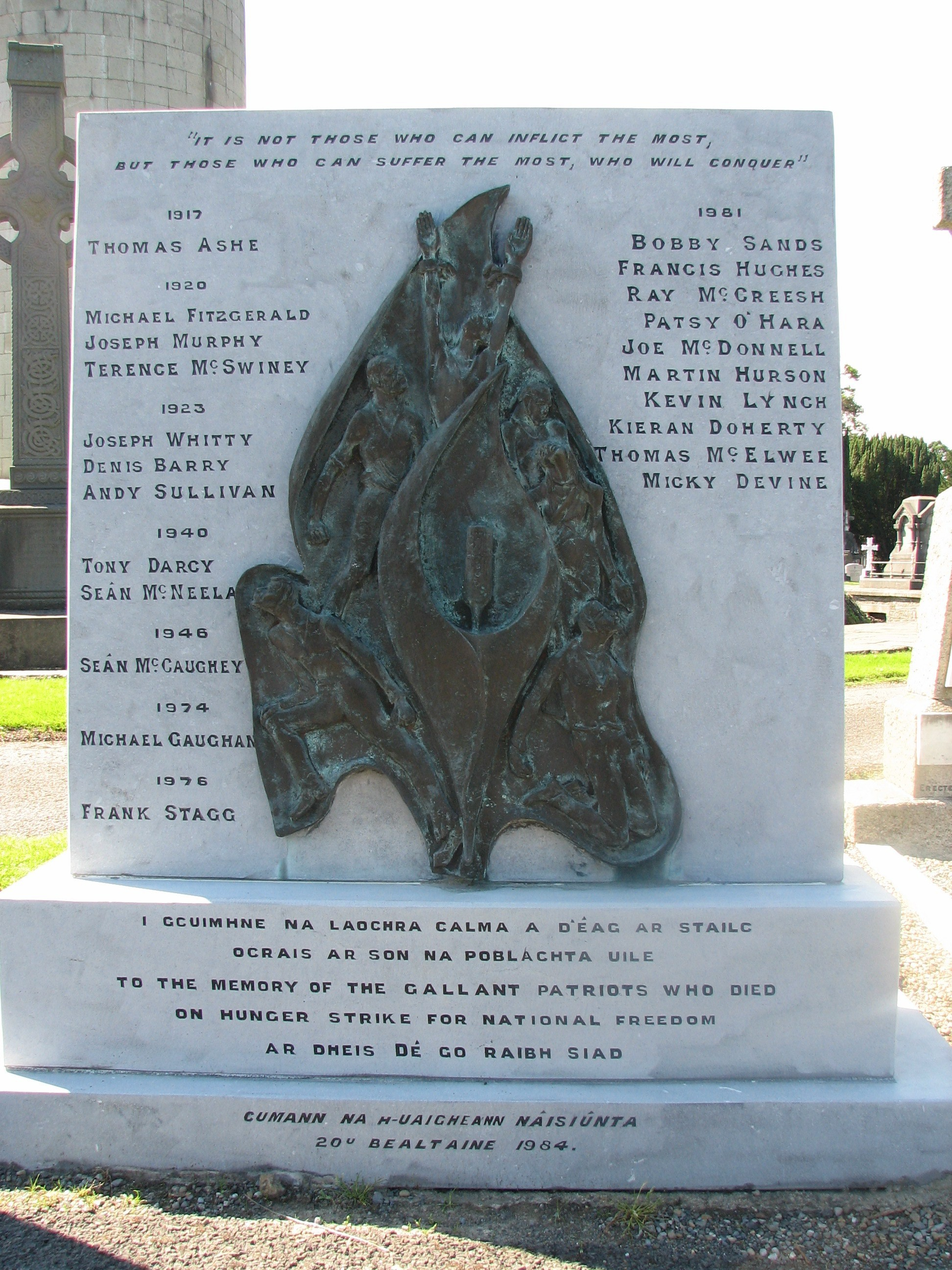
Memorial to 22 Irish Hunger Strikers Deaths Glasnevin Cemetery

== Background ==
Raymond Peter McCreesh, the seventh in a family of eight children, was born in St Malachy's Park, Camlough, on 25 February 1957. He was born into a strong Irish republican family, and was active in the republican movement from the age of 16. McCreesh attended the local primary school in Camlough, St Malachy's, and later attended St Colman's College in Newry. Raymond first joined Fianna Éireann, the IRA's youth wing, in 1973, and later that year he progressed to join the Provisional IRA South Armagh Brigade. McCreesh had worked for a short time as steelworker in a predominantly Protestant factory in Lisburn. However, as sectarian threats and violence escalated, he switched professions to work as a milk roundsman in his local area of South Armagh: an occupation which greatly increased his knowledge of the surrounding countryside, as well as enabling him to observe the movements of British Army patrols in the area.

== Arrest ==
On 25 June 1976, McCreesh (aged 19) and three other IRA volunteers attempted to ambush a British Army observation post (OP) in South Armagh. It lay opposite the Mountain House Inn, on the Newry–Newtonhamilton Road. As the armed, masked and uniformed IRA volunteers approached the OP, they were spotted by British paratroopers on a hillside. The paratroopers opened fire on the volunteers, who scattered. Two of them, McCreesh and Paddy Quinn, took cover in a nearby farmhouse. The paratroopers surrounded the house and fired a number of shots into the building. After some time, McCreesh and Quinn surrendered and were taken to Bessbrook British Army base. The third volunteer, Danny McGuinness, had taken cover in a disused quarry outhouse but was captured the next day. The fourth member of the unit managed to escape despite being shot in the leg, arm and chest. Local Catholic priests facilitated their surrender.

== Imprisonment and hunger strike ==
On 2 March 1977, McCreesh and Quinn were sentenced to fourteen years in prison for the attempted murder of British soldiers, possession of a rifle and ammunition, and a further five years for IRA membership. The rifle that McCreesh had in his possession when captured was one of those used in the Kingsmill massacre on 5 January 1976, when 10 Protestant civilians were shot dead.

McCreesh was sent to the Maze Prison. He joined the blanket protest and took part in the 1981 Irish hunger strike. He died on 21 May, after 61 days on hunger strike.

McCreesh's gravestone

One of the soldiers who captured McCreesh, Lance Corporal David Jones, was later killed by Francis Hughes, who died during the same hunger strike. Another Irish Republican Volunteer Patsy O'Hara died on the same day (21 May 1981) as McCreesh while on hunger strike in Maze Prison (Long Kesh).

== Raymond McCreesh Park ==
A Newry playground was named after McCreesh after a motion led by Sinn Féin, SDLP and independent representatives on Newry and Mourne District Council was passed. Unionists were unhappy with this and appealed to the Equality Commission which called for an equality impact assessment in 2008. The council sub-committee responsible for the assessment decided that naming the park after McCreesh complies with their legal requirement to "promote equality of opportunity and good relations between persons of different religious belief and political opinion".

In 2013, it was announced that the decision to name the park after McCreesh would be formally investigated by the Equality Commission for Northern Ireland. It said its investigation would consider whether the council had failed to have due regard to the need to promote equality and good relations between people of different religious beliefs and political opinion. Nothing came of the investigation.

== Sources ==
- Murtagh, T. (2018). The Maze Prison: A Hidden Story of Chaos, Anarchy and Politics. Hook: Waterside Press. ISBN 978-1-90997-655-9.
