= Roughton =

Roughton, as a person, may refer to:

- Roughton "Rou" Reynolds, English musician in the post hardcore band Enter Shikari
- Francis John Worsley Roughton, English biochemist
- Julian Roughton, the current Chief Executive of Suffolk Wildlife Trust

Roughton, as a place, may refer to:

- Roughton, Lincolnshire, a village and civil parish in East Lindsey, Lincolnshire, England
- Roughton, Norfolk, a village and parish in North Norfolk, Norfolk, England
- Roughton, Shropshire, a village in the heart of rural Shropshire
