= 104.6 FM =

FM radio frequency

The following radio stations broadcast on FM frequency 104.6 MHz:

== United Kingdom ==
- BBC Radio 4 in Camlough
- BBC Radio Bristol in Bath
- BBC Hereford & Worcester in Kidderminster
