= David Watts, Baron Watts =

British politician (born 1951)

The Right Honourable The Lord Watts
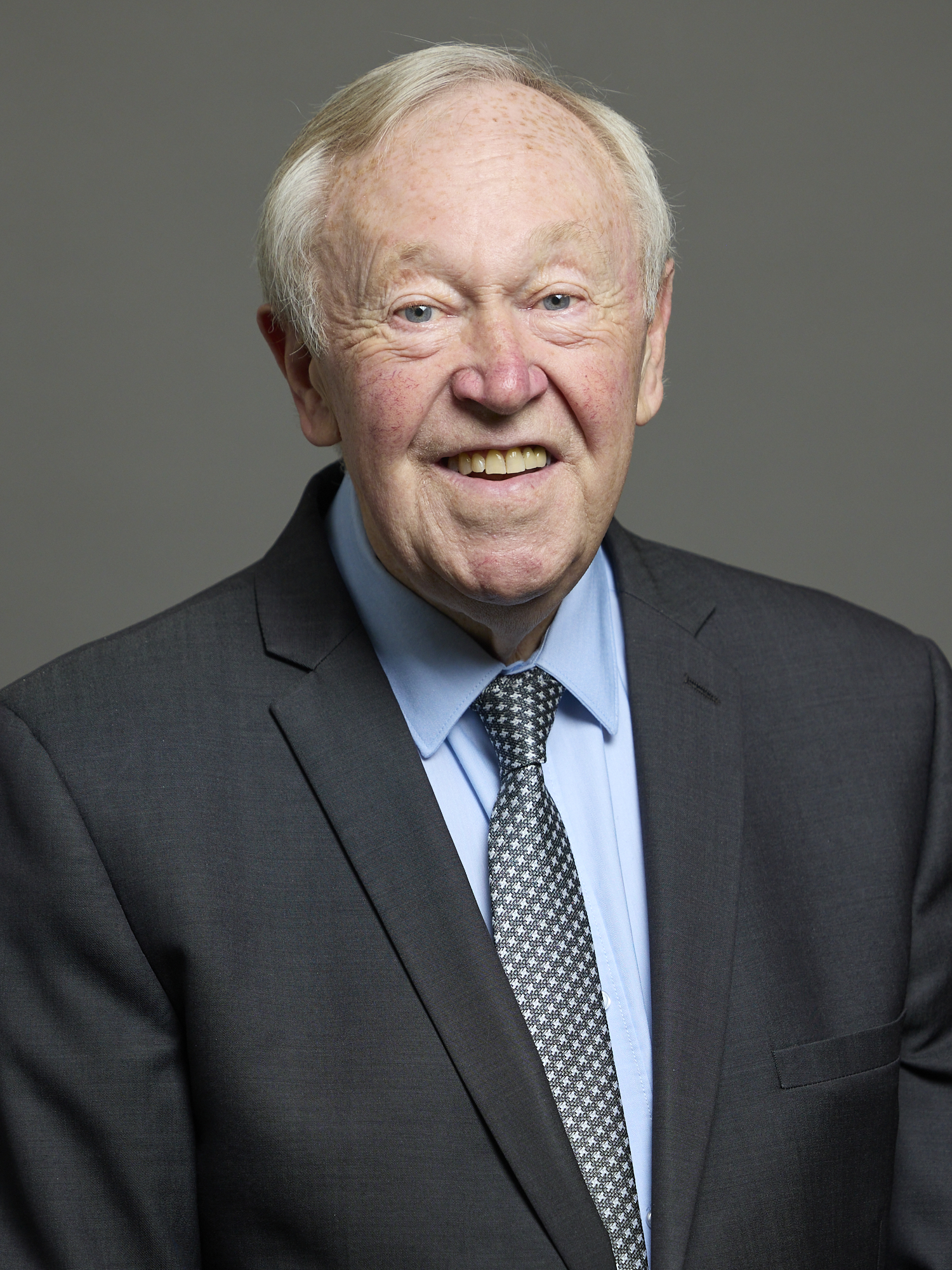
- Official portrait, 2025

Chair of the Parliamentary Labour Party
- In office 15 March 2012 – 9 February 2015
- Leader: Ed Miliband
- Preceded by: Tony Lloyd
- Succeeded by: John Cryer

Lord Commissioner of the Treasury
- In office 10 May 2005 – 11 May 2010
- Prime Minister: Tony Blair; Gordon Brown
- Preceded by: John Heppell
- Succeeded by: Angela Watkinson
Parliamentary offices
Member of the House of Lords
Lord Temporal
Life peerage 23 October 2015
Member of Parliament for St Helens North
In office 1 May 1997 – 30 March 2015
Preceded by	John Evans
Succeeded by	Conor McGinn

Personal details
- Born: 26 August 1951 (age 75) St Helens, England
- Party: Labour
- Spouse: Avril Davies (m. 1972)
- Children: 2

David Leonard Watts, Baron Watts (born 26 August 1951) is a British politician and life peer who served in the Blair and Brown governments as a Lord Commissioner of the Treasury from 2005 to 2010 and chaired the Parliamentary Labour Party as a backbencher from 2012 to 2015. A member of the Labour Party, he was Member of Parliament (MP) for St Helens North from 1997 to 2015.

== Early life ==
Watts was educated at Malvern Primary School and Huyton Hey Secondary Modern School, Huyton. He was leader of St Helens Metropolitan Borough Council for four years. He was a union official at Huntley & Palmers' biscuit factory in Huyton.

== Parliamentary career ==
Watts was a Government Whip and Lord Commissioner of HM Treasury from 2008 to 2010. On 15 March 2012, he was elected to succeed Tony Lloyd as the Chair of the Parliamentary Labour Party, a role he performed until he stood down to be replaced by John Cryer on 9 February 2015. He stood down at the 2015 General Election. Watts is associated with the Labour Friends of Israel.

Watts was nominated for a life peerage in the 2015 Dissolution Honours. On 23 October 2015, he was created Baron Watts, of Ravenhead in the County of Merseyside, for life. By virtue of that life peerage, he became a member of the House of Lords. He entered the House of Lords on 3 December 2015 continuing to sit under the Labour whip.

== Personal life ==
Watts married Avril Davies in 1972, with whom he has two sons.

Parliament of the United Kingdom
Preceded by John Evans	Member of Parliament for St Helens North; 1997–2015	Succeeded by Conor McGinn
Party political offices
Preceded by Tony Lloyd	Chair of the Parliamentary Labour Party; 2012–2015	Succeeded by John Cryer
Orders of precedence in the United Kingdom
Preceded by The Lord Hain	Gentlemen; Baron Watts	Followed by The Lord Mair
