= Conor McGinn =

British-Irish Independent politician (born 1984)

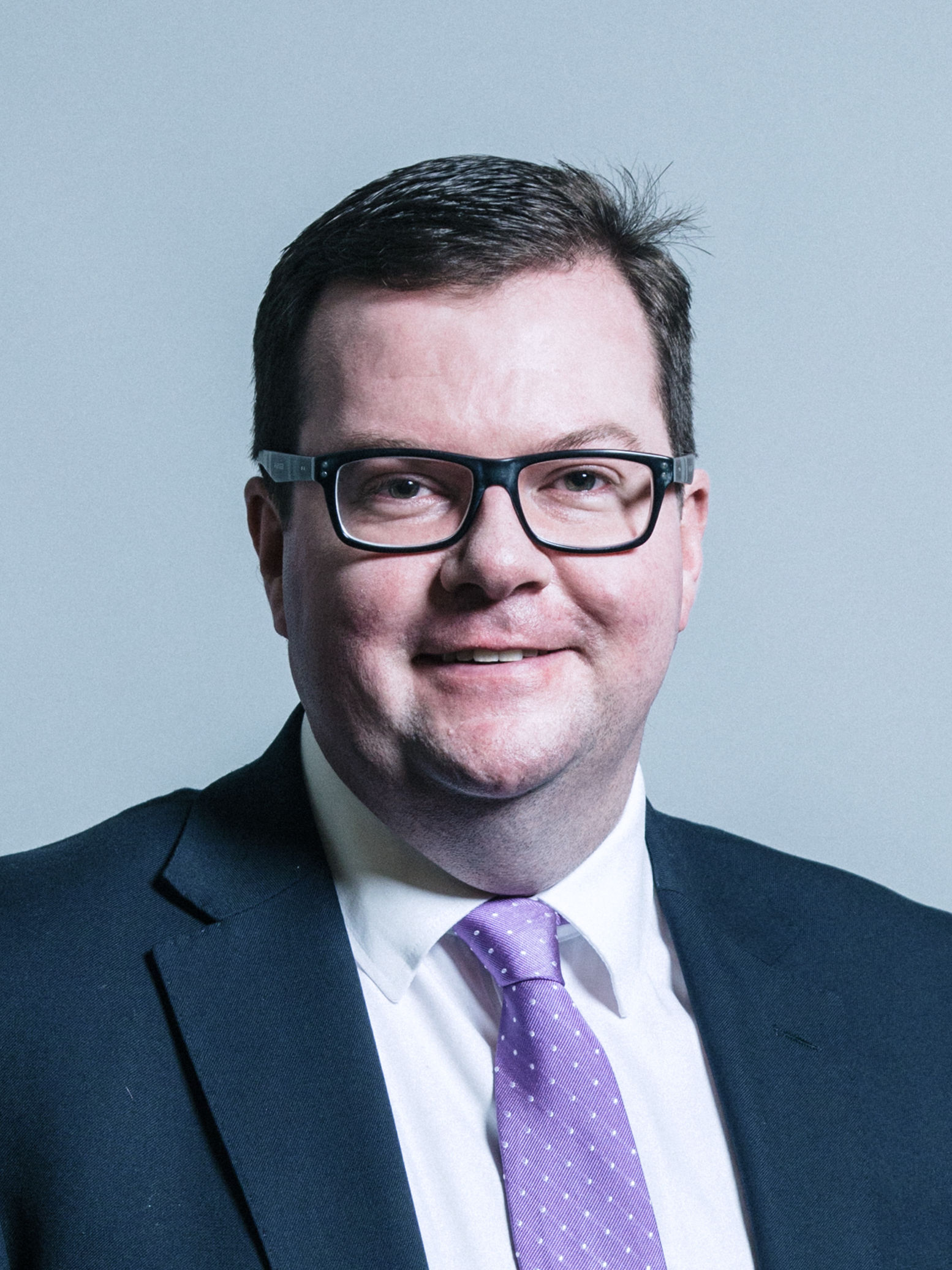
- Official portrait, 2017

Member of Parliament for St Helens North
- In office 7 May 2015 – 30 May 2024
- Preceded by: David Watts
- Succeeded by: David Baines
Shadow portfolios
Shadow Cabinet
2021–2022	Without Portfolio
2021–2022	Deputy Campaign Coordinator
Shadow Frontbench
2020–2021	Security
2020–2020	Whip
2015–2016	Whip

Personal details
- Born: Conor Patrick McGinn; 31 July 1984 (age 42) Camlough, County Armagh, Northern Ireland
- Citizenship: British; Irish
- Party: Labour (until 2023)
- Spouse: Kate Groucutt
- Education: Goldsmiths, University of London; London Metropolitan University
- Website: conormcginn.co.uk

Conor Patrick McGinn (born 31 July 1984) is a British and Irish politician who served as the Member of Parliament (MP) for St Helens North from 2015 to 2024.

== Early life and education ==
Conor McGinn was born on 31 July 1984 in Camlough, County Armagh, Northern Ireland, and brought up in the nearby village of Bessbrook. The village was highly militarised during The Troubles. His mother was an NHS clerical officer, and his father was a Sinn Féin councillor.

McGinn went to St Paul's High School, Bessbrook. Before going to university, he worked for the African National Congress in South Africa on a fellowship for two months. He studied at Goldsmiths, University of London, but did not initially complete his degree, remaining in London working for a mental health charity for Irish immigrants, Immigrant Counselling and Psychotherapy, and later for the Irish Council for Prisoners Overseas. He later completed his history, politics and Irish studies degree part-time at London Metropolitan University.

== Political career ==
McGinn was chair of the Young Fabians from 2006 to 2007, and was also vice-chair of Young Labour. He was a candidate for Islington London Borough Council in 2006 and 2010 without success. He has been on the executive of the Fabian Society and until 2012 was chair of the Labour Party Irish Society. In 2011 he represented the socialist societies on the Labour Party National Executive Committee.

He worked as a public affairs and government relations consultant, before becoming an advisor to shadow Northern Ireland Secretary Vernon Coaker in 2011, and continued to work for Coaker when he became shadow defence secretary.

== Parliamentary career ==
McGinn was elected to Parliament as MP for St Helens North with 57% of the vote and a majority of 17,291.

McGinn supported Andy Burnham's bid for the leadership of the Labour Party in 2015. He nominated Owen Smith in the 2016 leadership election.

In July 2016, he was involved in a Twitter spat with Labour leader Jeremy Corbyn, in which McGinn claimed that Corbyn "said that he intended to ring my father", a former Sinn Féin councillor. Corbyn's spokesman said the claim was "untrue".

Following the October 2016 Shadow Cabinet reshuffle, and the replacement of Dame Rosie Winterton as Chief Whip, McGinn resigned as a whip.

At the snap 2017 general election, McGinn was re-elected as MP for St Helens North with an increased vote share of 63.7% and an increased majority of 18,406.

In July 2019, McGinn submitted and moved the successful House of Commons amendment to change the law to extend equal marriage for LGBT people to Northern Ireland.

At the 2019 general election, McGinn was again re-elected, with a decreased vote share of 52.3% and a decreased majority of 12,209.

In February 2020, McGinn supported the campaign for Helen's Law, working with Marie McCourt to successfully introduce a Private Members Bill and getting the Government to commit to introducing tougher penalties for murderers who refuse to reveal the location of their victims' remains.

On 9 April 2020, McGinn was appointed as Shadow Minister for Security. In June 2021, he was appointed as Labour's deputy national campaign coordinator. In December 2021, he was appointed Shadow Minister without Portfolio.

McGinn was suspended by the Labour Party in December 2022, following an unspecified complaint. In October 2023, he left the party in order to withdraw from the process; he stated that he had done nothing wrong, that there had been "no finding of any wrongdoing", and that the process was "flawed, protracted and prejudicial". On 5 May 2023, McGinn announced he would be standing down at the 2024 general election.

In January 2026 he was charged with sexual assault, and in February 2026 he plead not guilty for an alleged offence which happened in July 2022. The full trial should take place late 2026.

== Personal life ==
McGinn has lived in Earlestown, Newton-le-Willows. He currently resides in Lambeth, London. He married Kate Groucutt around 2009 and has a son and a daughter. McGinn holds both Irish and British citizenship.

Parliament of the United Kingdom
Preceded by David Watts	Member of Parliament for St Helens North; 2015–2024	Succeeded by David Baines
Party political offices
Preceded by Prema Gurunathan	Chair of the Young Fabians; 2006–2007	Succeeded by Mark Rusling
Preceded by Keith Vaz and Simon Wright	Socialist societies representative on the Labour Party National Executive Committee; 2011–2015; With: Keith Vaz	Succeeded by James Asser and Keith Vaz
