= John Evans, Baron Evans of Parkside =

British politician (1930–2016)

The Right Honourable The Lord Evans of Parkside

Member of the House of Lords
- Lord Temporal
- Life peerage 10 June 1997 – 20 April 2015

Member of Parliament for St Helens North Newton (1974–1983)
- In office 28 February 1974 – 8 April 1997
- Preceded by: Frederick Lee
- Succeeded by: David Watts

Personal details
- Born: October 19, 1930 Belfast, Northern Ireland
- Died: March 5, 2016 (aged 85) London, England
- Party: Labour
- Spouse: Joan Slater (m. 1959)
- Children: 3

John Evans, Baron Evans of Parkside (19 October 1930 – 5 March 2016) was a British politician who was a Labour Party Member of Parliament (MP).

In 1959 he married Joan (nee Slater) with whom he had three children: David, Judith and Alan.

A former shipyard worker and trade unionist, he served as a member of Hebburn urban district council from 1962 until 1974 (of which he was chairman from 1973 to 1974) and South Tyneside council from 1973 to 1974.

Evans was elected to Parliament in the February 1974 general election for the Newton constituency, which he represented until it was abolished for the 1983 election. He then served as MP for the new St Helens North constituency, which partially replaced Newton, until he stood down at the 1997 election, being succeeded by David Watts. On 10 June 1997 he was created a life peer as Baron Evans of Parkside, of St Helens in the County of Merseyside.

Evans also served as a member of the European Parliament, from 1975 until 1978.

== Notes ==
Parliament of the United Kingdom
Preceded by Fred Lee	Member of Parliament for Newton; February 1974 – 1983	Constituency abolished
New constituency	Member of Parliament for St Helens North; 1983–1997	Succeeded by Dave Watts
Party political offices
Preceded by Les Huckfield	Socialist societies representative on the Labour Party National Executive Committee; 1982–1996	Succeeded by Ian McCartney
Preceded by Tom Sawyer	Chair of the Labour Party; 1991–1992	Succeeded by Tony Clarke
