= Catherine Dorothea Burdett =

Irish novelist

- Born: Catherine Dorothea Browne; 1784; Dublin, Ireland
- Died: 14 May 1861 (aged 76–77); Cheltenham, Gloucestershire, United Kingdom
- Occupation: Writer
- Writing career
- Genre: Novel

Catherine Dorothea Burdett (1784 – 14 May 1861) was an Irish novelist who drew mainly on personal experience.

== Life and career ==
She was born Catherine Dorothea Browne in Dublin, 1784, to Frances Corry, who was sister to the MP Isaac Corry, and her husband Col. William Browne of Glengarry, who served in the American Revolutionary War. Her father worked in Ireland as an Army recruitment agent and when he died in 1813, Burdett ended in a legal case brought by the government against her father's estate looking for an account of his finances. The case continued on for over 10 years.

She married widower Capt. George Burdett, R. N., of Longtown House, County Kildare in 1806. He had served in the British navy during the Napoleonic Wars and the War of 1812. They had a son George and two daughters, Frances Elizabeth and Catherine Jane.

Burdett published her first novel in 1827 and continued writing books which were largely based on her own experiences. Her books were published as written by Mrs C. D. Burdett. Her husband was killed unexpectedly when a chemist's assistant mistakenly mislabelled oil of tar as his prescription in 1832. She herself died while visiting Cheltenham, Gloucestershire, in 1861.

== Bibliography ==
- English Fashionables Abroad: A Novel. H. Colburn. 1827.
- At Home: A Novel. H. Colburn. 1828.
- Walter Hamilton Volume 3; A Novel. General Books. 9 February 2012. ISBN 978-1-235-83194-2.
- High Life: A Novel. Saunders and Otley. 1827. pp. 7–.
- A Year and a Day
