= John Grubb Richardson =

Irish businessman and philanthropist

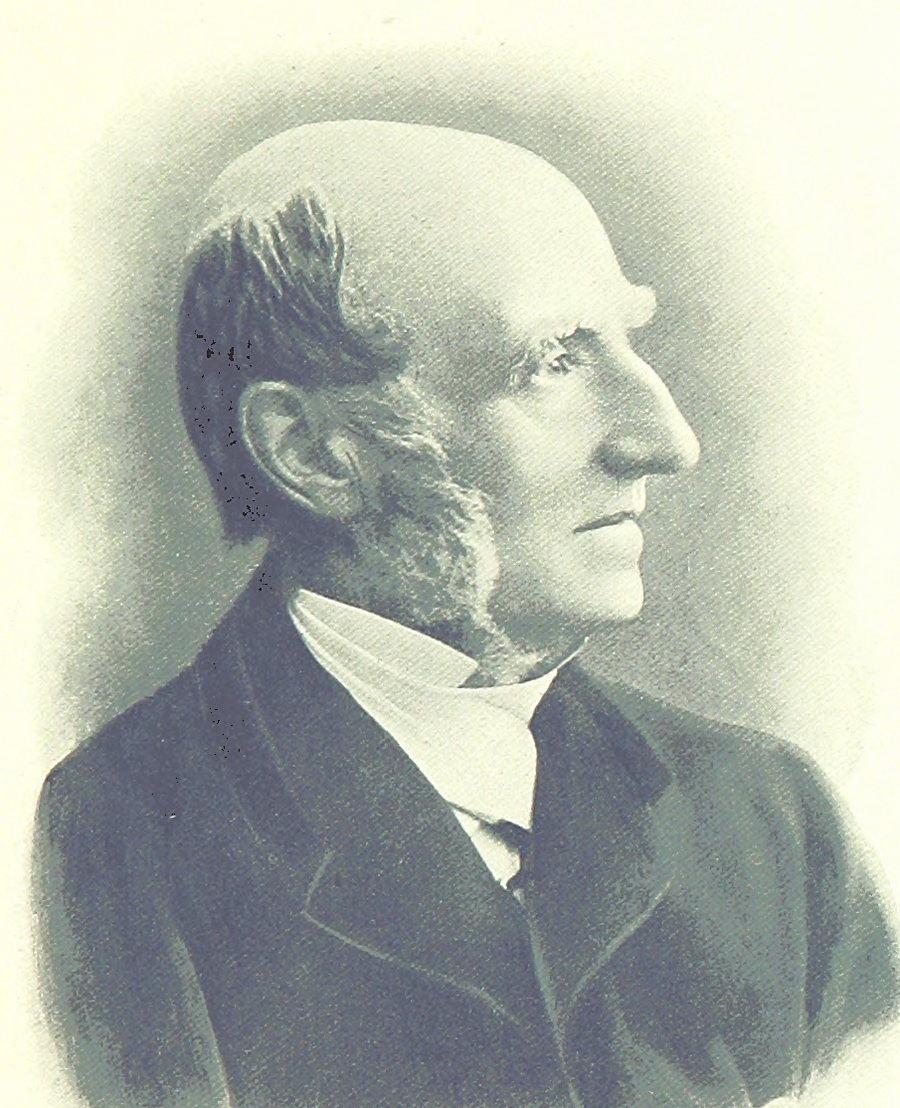
- Born: 1813; Ireland
- Died: 1891 (aged 77–78); Ireland
- Occupations: Linen merchant, ship owner
- Known for: Founding Bessbrook
- Spouse(s): Helena Grubb & Jane Wakefield
- Children: Two sons, eight daughters
- Parent(s): James Richardson & Anna Grubb

John Grubb Richardson (13 November 1813 – 1891) was an Irish linen merchant, industrialist and philanthropist who founded the model village of Bessbrook near Newry in 1845, in what is now Northern Ireland. Five years later he founded a major Atlantic steamship line that significantly improved conditions for immigrant passengers fleeing Ireland after the Great Famine. He also founded Richardson Fertilizer Limited that remained in business under its original name until 2002.

Richardson was the second of ten children of James Nicholson Richardson (1782–1847), a wealthy Quaker linen merchant, and Anna Grubb, from a large Quaker family in Clonmel. The Richardson family originally came to Ireland from England in 1622 and the Grubb family also came from England in 1656. John Richardson was raised at Glenmore House, outside Lisburn, County Antrim. At the age of eleven, he boarded for three years at Ballitore, County Kildare (the same Quaker school attended by Edmund Burke) before attending another Quaker school at Frenchay, Gloucestershire.

In 1844, Richardson married Helena Grubb (27 March 1819 – 7 December 1849) of Cahir Abbey, County Tipperary, who was his second cousin, his mother, Anne Grubb, and her father, Richard Grubb, were first cousins. John and Helena's shared second cousin once removed was Thomas Grubb, founder of the Grubb Telescope Company. John and Helena had a son, James Nicholson Richardson before she died giving birth to a daughter, named Helena. In 1853, Richardson married Jane Marion Wakefield, of Moyallon House, County Down. A Quaker, John declined the offer of a baronetcy. With Jane, he had one son, Thomas Wakefield Richardson and seven daughters. He died at Moyallon House, an estate inherited through his second wife's family, near Gilford, County Down. His estate surrounding his Bessbrook home at The Wood House and Derrymore House (now a National Trust property) is a designated historic park.

== Business career ==
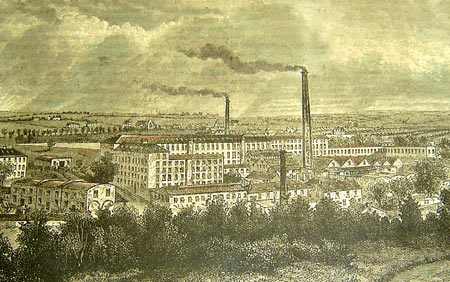
Richardsons' Mill, Bessbrook

In 1830, John Grubb Richardson entered the family linen export firm, JN Richardson Sons and Owden. In 1841, one of his younger brothers, Thomas Richardson was sent to New York as agent for the family's business. In 1845, John, along with his father and older brother Jonathan, decided to manufacture linen products and purchased a burned-out mill in Bessbrook, then a small village. This project coincided with the beginning of the famine and farmers needed work to buy food. John, the second eldest son in the firm, was the driving force behind the manufacturing venture. Bessbrook was selected for the new business because of the availability of water power and the large amount of flax grown in the area. John expanded the site with new manufacturing buildings constructed with local Mourne granite and dedicated housing for the workforce built to a high standard for the period. In planning the community, John refused to allow a public house, pawn brokers or a police station. He famously stated that a police station was unnecessary if there were no public houses or pawn brokers. In 1852, the firm became one of the first in Ireland to install steam-powered looms.

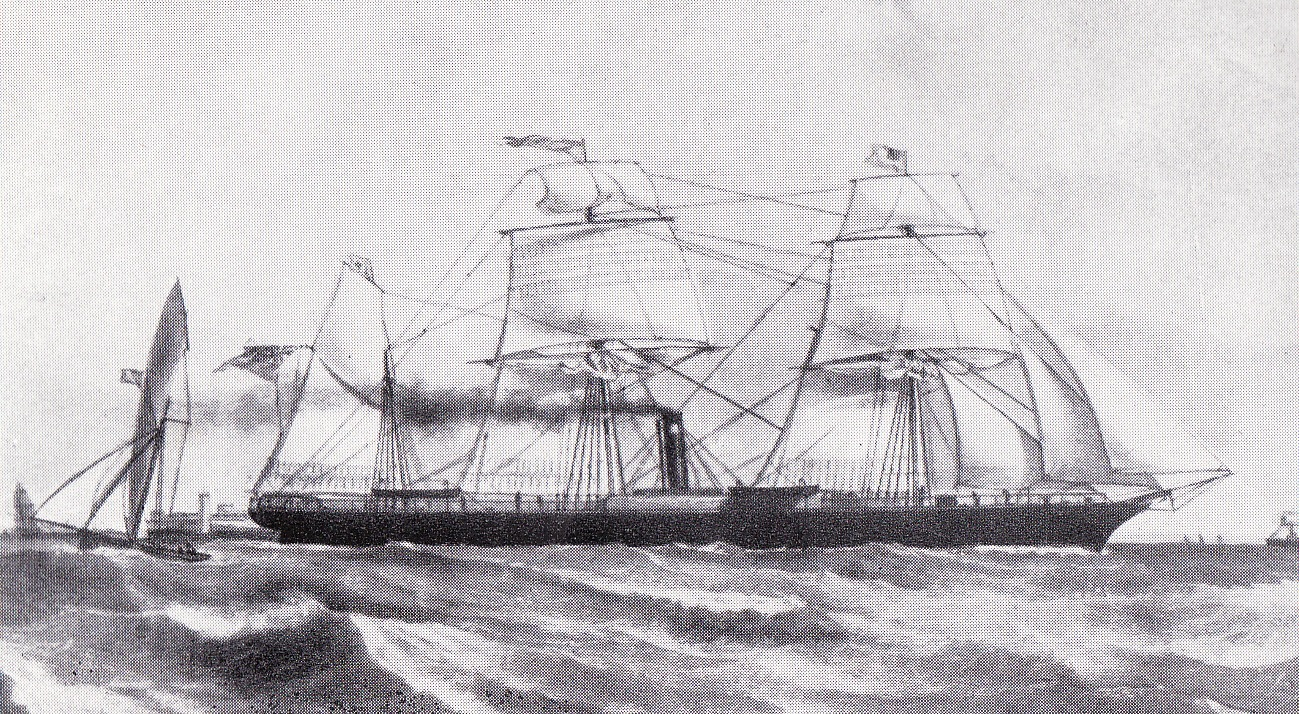
City of Glasgow of 1850 established that steamships could operate on the Atlantic without subsidies.

John also hired a young business partner, William Inman, to operate the linen shipping business. In 1850, Inman persuaded John and his brothers to form the Liverpool and Philadelphia Steamship Company and buy an advanced new ship, the SS City of Glasgow. She proved profitable because her iron hull required less repair and her screw propulsion system left more room for passengers and freight. The ship's moderate speed also considerably reduced coal consumption.

In 1852, Richardson's steamship line broke new ground by transporting steerage passengers under steam. Richardson was concerned about the poor conditions experienced by immigrants travelling to America after the famine. From the beginning, he provided better steerage quarters and adopted the recommendations of a Parliamentary Committee to provide cooked meals to immigrants. Because of his opposition to war, in 1855 Richardson sold his interest in the firm to Inman after Inman chartered ships to the French during the Crimean War. The Inman line emerged after the war as one of the major steamship firms on the Atlantic and ultimately became a part of the American Line.

Richardson was also in the chemical fertiliser business. In 1855, he took over a bone-crushing business in Belfast and converted it to produce chemical fertiliser. By the 1880s, the firm manufactured over 6,000 toms annually. The company was sold after Richardson's death, but retained his name until the company closed in 2002.

In 1863, John purchased his brothers' interests in the linen manufacturing business and reorganised the firm as the Bessbrook Spinning Company. At that time, the production of linen was booming because the American Civil War cut off cotton supplies to British manufacturers. In the first two years, the company's annual profits rose from just over 8,000 pounds to over 41,000 pounds. Eventually 3,000 people worked for Richardson in Bessbrook and its satellite factory at Craigmore.

== Later life ==
Richardson was a strong advocate for public education. At his insistence, a public school was established in Bessbrook that educated children of all religions together. In 1861, John testified before the Clarendon Commission on this issue which ultimately resulted in the adoption of the Public Schools Act in 1868.

John Richardson turned down a Baronetcy, a reward for his good works, due to his belief in equality. His eldest son by Helena Grubb, J. Nicholson Richardson, was Liberal Member of Parliament for Armagh. His great-nephew was Sir Joseph Barcroft, whose family home, The Glen, Newry, was purchased by Richardson for the Barcrofts.
