= Derrymore House =

Historic house in County Armagh

Coordinates: 54.187°N 6.378°W

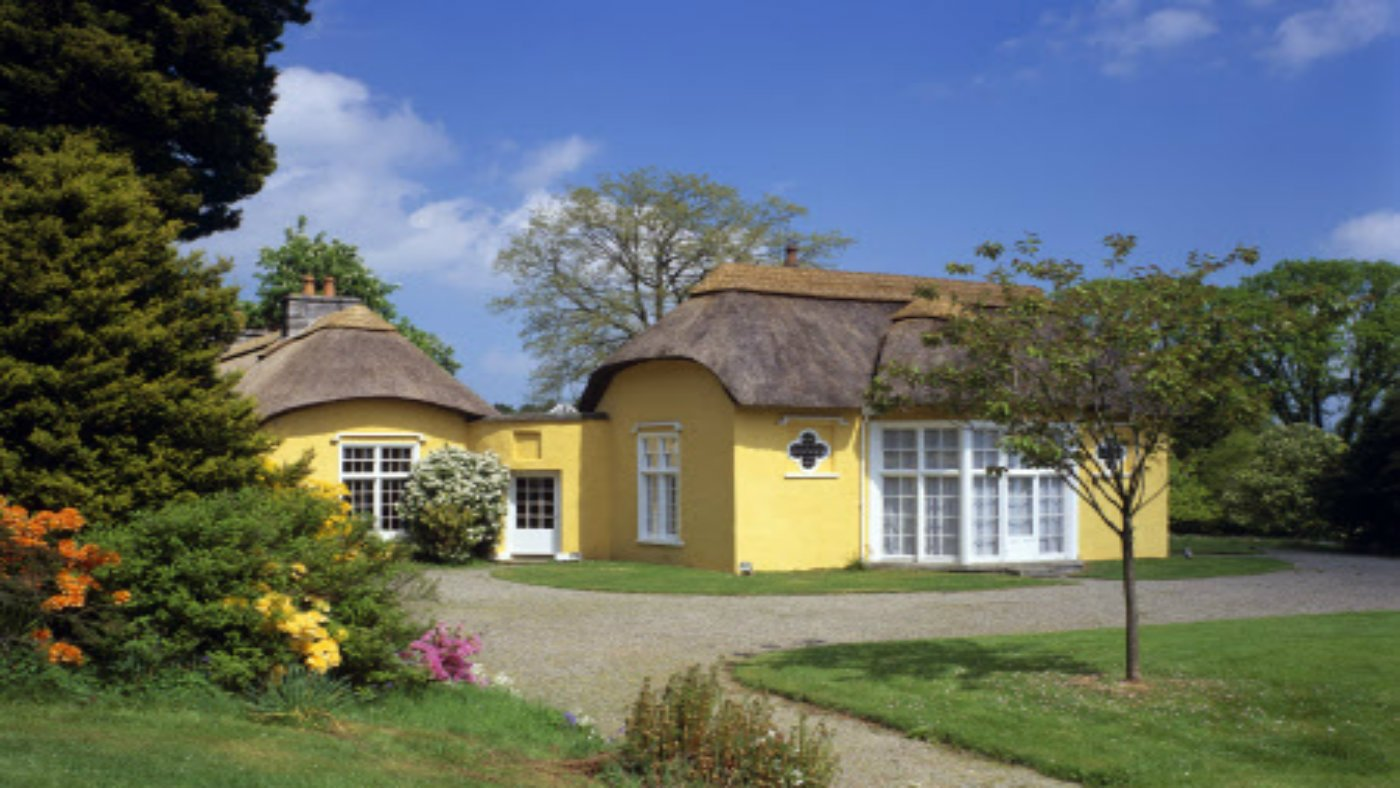
Derrymore House

Derrymore House (Irish: Teach Dhoire Mhóir) is a National Trust property in Bessbrook, County Armagh, Northern Ireland. The grounds are open to the public most of the year round and the drawing room or "Treaty Room" in the house itself on selected dates only. It is described by the National Trust as a "late 18th-century thatched house in gentrified vernacular style".

== Features ==
Built in the style of a "cottage orné", the single storey house is set in a partly-walled demesne in 100 acres (0.40 km^{2}) of parkland and woodland. It features unique local thatching using Shannon reeds. The surrounding parkland was laid out by John Sutherland (1745–1826), one of the most celebrated disciples of Capability Brown. The park includes woodland belts, a largely unused walled kitchen garden, a small quarry, and a short walking trail. There are four gate lodges within the grounds, including the head gardener's house, known as Hortus Lodge. These were added in the 19th century, one before 1834, two before 1861 and one before 1906.

== History ==
=== Isaac Corry, MP ===
The house was built between 1776 and 1787 by Isaac Corry, MP for Newry for thirty years, on land he inherited from his father. The house was described by Sir Charles Coote as "without exception, the most elegant summer lodge..." Corry was the last chancellor of the Exchequer of Ireland before the Act of Union 1800, in which he played a significant role. It has been suggested that the Act of Union may have been drafted in the drawing room (also known as the Treaty Room) of the house in 1800 although there is little evidence to support this. It is possible that the Act may have been discussed here though the actual signing took place at Parliament House, Dublin.

=== Later years ===
Derrymore was sold by Corry in 1810, when he moved to Dublin, and was later acquired by the Young family. Sir William Young, 1st Baronet, sold the Derrymore estate in 1825 to the Smyth family. The demesne, which hosted 140,000 trees, was then bought by a wealthy Merchant Robert Glenny of Trevor Hill in Newry who in turn sold it onto the linen manufacturer John Grubb Richardson who lived in the adjoining estate, The Woodhouse. Richardson was responsible for establishing the village of Bessbrook and building Bessbrook Friends' Meeting House, which sits in the Derrymore demesne. In 1952 Mr. J. S. W. Richardson, a descendant of J. Grubb Richardson, donated Derrymore House and his estate at Bessbrook to the National Trust. The National Trust subsequently undertook to demolish a large portion of the house, which had been added by the Richardson family in the Georgian style, in order to return the property to the manner in which Isaac Corry had known it.

The banner of Bessbrook Star of Hope Temperance Loyal Orange Lodge 927, depicts Derrymore House. During The Troubles, the house was damaged by explosive devices planted on five occasions between 1972 and 1979. The then custodian, Edmund Baillie, carried some of these bombs away from the house to the garden. Due to damage suffered by the structure at this time, most if not all of the timbers had been replaced and some changes made to the interior.

The Derrymore estate became a military camp during World War II. Most of the structures built at this time have since been demolished and the ground re-landscaped. A concrete road and some earthworks remain. The estate hosted the US Army Quartermaster Depot Q111-D from 23 November 1943 to August 1944.

== Recent years ==
The house has been managed by a property management company on behalf of the National Trust in recent years, being occupied by a number of different former tenants in the two wings of the house, although the National Trust retained the use of the central area of the property consisting mainly of the drawing room, holding various events there intermittently. Recent plans were lodged for the redesign and renovation of the wings to allow for separate tenancies which would not interfere with the Trust's operations on the site.

Funding was secured in 2019 for the redevelopment of the Derrymore Estate in order to develop themed walking trails that will incorporate new play areas, seating and viewing areas and other enhancements to the estate grounds.
