= Isaac Corry =

Irish politician

Isaac Corry FRS, PC (I), PC (15 May 1753 – 15 May 1813) was an Irish and British Member of Parliament and lawyer.

== Early career ==
Born in Newry, he was the son of Edward Corry (d. 1792), sometime Member of Parliament, and Catharine Bristow. His cousin was the writer Catherine Dorothea Burdett. He was educated at the Royal School, Armagh, where his contemporaries included Viscount Castlereagh, and later at Trinity College, Dublin, from which he graduated in 1773. On 18 October 1771 he was admitted to the Middle Temple and called to the bar at King's Inns in 1779.

== Member of Parliament ==
In 1776 Corry succeeded his father as Member of Parliament for Newry, sitting in the Irish House of Commons until the Act of Union in 1801. From 1782 to 1789 he served as equerry to the Duke of Cumberland, being described in 1794 by Rt. Hon. Sylvester Douglas as "a well-bred man...He has no brogue...He once acted as a sort of groom of the bedchamber to the late Duke of Cumberland." In 1798, he was also elected for Randalstown, but chose not to sit and in 1802, he was returned to the British House of Commons for Newry. He served as a Whig at Westminster until 1806. It was written in 1783 that Corry would expect to enter high office, given that "he lives expensively and does not pursue his profession, which is the law." In 1788 he became Clerk of the [Irish] Ordnance. The following year Corry was appointed a commissioner of the revenue. Finally in 1799 he was appointed Irish Chancellor of the Exchequer and a Lord High Treasurer of Ireland in place of Sir John Parnell, who quarrelled violently with Pitt over the projected union, which he categorically refused to support. In 1795 he became a Privy Councillor.

== Later years ==
In 1802 Corry was dismissed from the Exchequer and replaced by John Foster (later Lord Oriel), he was awarded, however, £2,000 p.a. in compensation. In 1806 the changes in ownership of the Newry estates altered Corry's position; the lands had passed to a senior line of the Needham family and Lady Downshire, decided to return his brother General Francis Needham, 1st Earl of Kilmorey at the general election. Corry did not have the funds needed, in excess of £5000, to purchase a seat elsewhere. However, Lady Downshire was inclined to support the Grenville ministry and came to a formal agreement with Corry to give him £1000 towards his expenses should he be successful in Newry, and, if not, to bring him in for another borough. Corry failed against the Needham interest in Newry, but a seat at Newport, Isle of Wight, was purchased for him, with £4000 from Lady Downshire, and Corry was appointed to the Board of Trade. Six months later Grenville's ministry had fallen and there was another general election. Corry stood, again unsuccessfully, for Newry.

Corry was unmarried but had a long-term relationship with Jane Symms, they had six children (three sons and three daughters); his daughter Ann married Lt.-Col. Henry Westenra, the brother of the first Baron Rossmore. Corry's residence in Newry was the Abbey Yard, now a school, and Derrymore House, Bessbrook, which he had inherited from his father and sold in 1810. It is now the property of the National Trust. During Corry's life, a road was constructed from near the main entrance of Derrymore House around Newry and linked up with the Dublin Road on the southern side of the town primarily for Corry's use. This road subsequently became known as "The Chancellor's Road," as a result of Corry's term as the Irish Chancellor of the Exchequer. A local legend has it that the road was constructed after an incident in which Corry's stagecoach was stoned while passing through Newry by people angry at an unpopular window tax he had introduced. The road has retained this name but it was cut in half by the Newry by-pass in the mid-1990s, however as a result of works associated with the new A1 dual carriageway the two-halves of the road have now been reconnected.

He died at his house in Merrion Square, Dublin and is buried in St. Patrick's Cathedral, Dublin.

Parliament of Ireland
Preceded by William Needham; Edward Corry	Member of Parliament for Newry; 1776 – 1801; With: Robert Ross 1776–1799; John Moore 1799–1801	Succeeded by Parliament of the United Kingdom
Preceded by Edward Corry; John Dunn	Member of Parliament for Randalstown; 1798; With: George Jackson	Succeeded by James McClelland; George Jackson
Parliament of the United Kingdom
New constituency	Member of Parliament for Newry; 1802 – 1806	Succeeded by Francis Needham
Preceded by John Blackburn; Richard Gervas Ker	Member of Parliament for Newport; 1806 – 1807; With: Sir John Doyle	Succeeded by The Viscount Palmerston; Sir Arthur Wellesley
