= David Baines =

British politician

David Baines MP
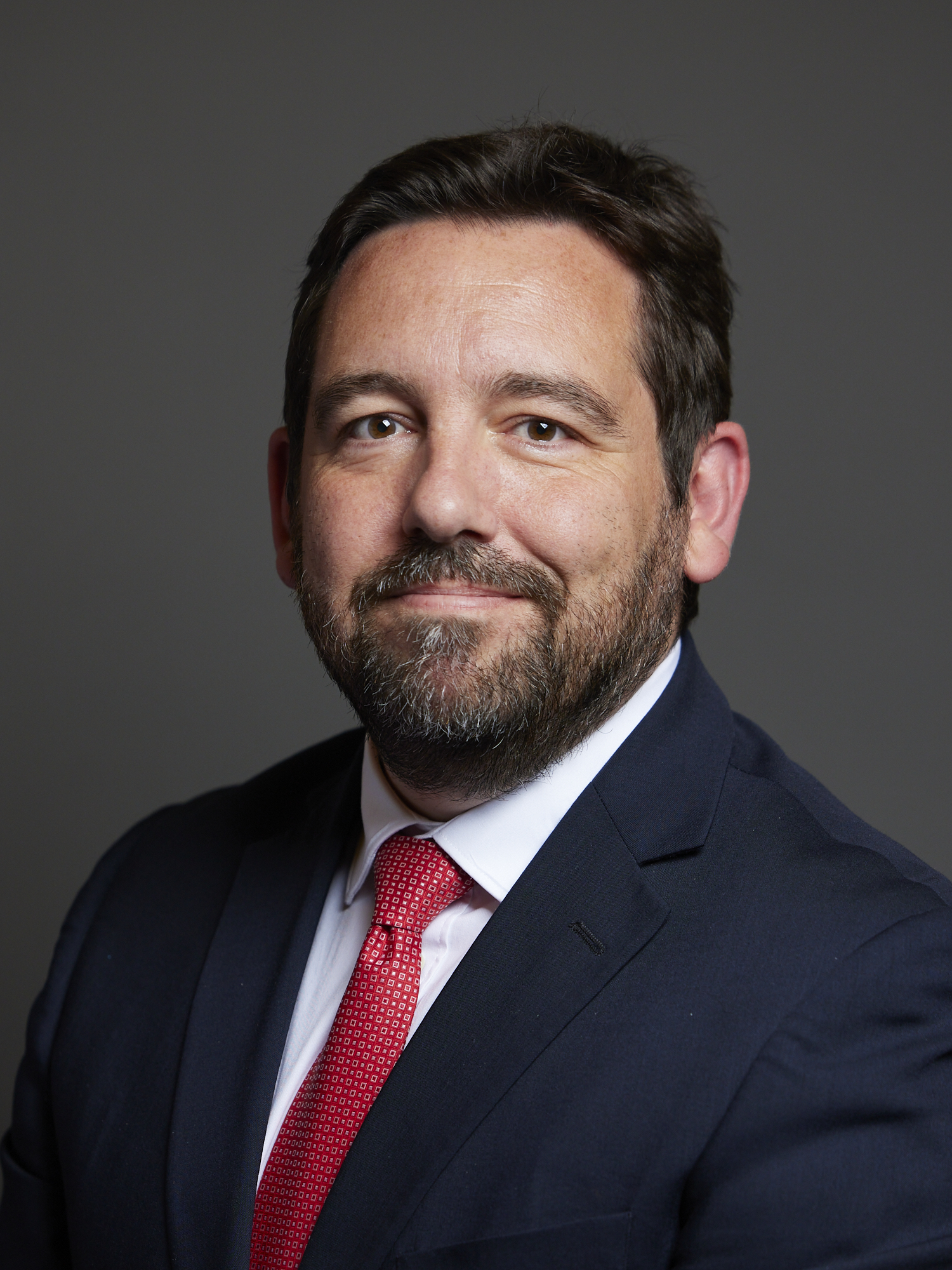
- Official portrait, 2024

Parliamentary Private Secretary for Prime Minister's Office
- Incumbent
- Assumed office 27 July 2026 Serving with Jo Platt & Sir Nic Dakin
- Prime Minister: Andy Burnham
- Preceded by: Abena Oppong-Asare; Jon Pearce; Catherine Fookes

Member of Parliament for St Helens North
- Incumbent
- Assumed office 4 July 2024
- Preceded by: Conor McGinn
- Majority: 12,169 (30.1%)

Deputy Mayor of the Liverpool City Region
- In role June 2023 – July 2024
- Mayor: Steve Rotheram
- Succeeded by: Mike Wharton

Leader of St Helens Council
- In office 22 May 2019 – 15 May 2024
- Preceded by: Derek Long
- Succeeded by: Anthony Burn

Personal details
- Born: David Edward Baines; 25 June 1979 (age 47)
- Party: Labour
- Education: Liverpool John Moores University (BA); University of Manchester (MA)

David Edward Baines (born 25 June 1979) is a British Labour Party politician who has been Member of Parliament (MP) for St Helens North since 2024.

== Early life and education ==
Baines was born on 25 June 1979. He grew up in Haydock. He was a student in media and cultural studies at Liverpool John Moores University, graduating with a Bachelor of Arts (BA) degree in 2000. He undertook a Master of Arts (MA) degree in economics and social studies/labour studies at the University of Manchester, which he completed in 2002.

He worked as a school teacher before going into politics. He achieved qualified teacher status in 2005. He then worked as a primary school teacher in the Metropolitan Borough of St Helens, until he was elected a councillor.

== Political career ==
He was elected as a St Helens Council councillor for the Windle ward in 2013. In 2019, he became leader of St Helens Council, and later Deputy Mayor of the Liverpool City Region before standing down in 2024 ahead of his general election campaign, having been selected as the Labour candidate for St Helens North.

In the 2024 General Elections, Baines was elected as MP for St Helens North with 21,284 votes (52.6%) and a majority of 12,169 over the second place Reform UK candidate. On 26 July 2024, he made his maiden speech in the House of Commons during a debate on "Making Britain a Clean Energy Superpower". Baines dedicated his first Parliamentary Question to special educational needs and disabilities (SEND) provision, an issue he has regularly campaigned on and called for further improvements to protect children with SEND.

As a lifelong St Helens R.F.C. fan and supporter of the game, Baines was elected as chair of the All Party Parliamentary Group (APPG) for rugby league. The APPG exists to act as a link between Government, stakeholders and supporters to highlight the most important issues affecting the sport.

Since his election as the Member of Parliament for St Helens North in 2024, Baines has spoken on a range of issues in Parliament. He has contributed to debates on transport connectivity across north-west England, including calling for improved accessibility at railway stations in his constituency, including Garswood and Earlestown.

With his background as a primary school teacher, Baines has regularly supported improvements to education, serving on the Public Bill Committee for the Children's Wellbeing and Schools Bill and raising questions on teacher qualifications, school accountability, child poverty and support for breakfast clubs.

In 2025, he contributed to debates on the Armed Forces Commissioner Bill, arguing for greater recognition of the needs of service families. He has also used Business of the House debates to pay tribute to local campaigners and highlight issues such as maternity services and hospital closures.

In 2026, he called on Keir Starmer to resign following the 2026 United Kingdom local elections. In July 2026, after Andy Burnham succeeded Starmer as prime minister, he was appointed a parliamentary private secretary in the Prime Minister's Office.

== Campaigns ==
Baines has acted as a key figure in various campaigns that he is passionate about. As a huge advocate for men's mental health and paternity leave, Baines has supported both Movember and the Dad Shift campaign who collaborated to highlight issues surrounding current UK paternity leave laws and their impact on fathers' mental health. In August 2025, Baines hosted a roundtable on behalf of the campaign with local fathers to hear about their experiences and how paternity leave could be improved by the government following the parental leave and pay review consultation.

After being elected as chair of the Rugby League APPG, Baines began to campaign both publicly and privately for the sports first ever knighthood in its 130-year history, labelling it a "a sporting injustice that has persisted for far too long, that no Rugby League player had been knighted for services to the sport, its communities and our country." On 9 June 2025, Billy Boston, who had 488 appearances for Wigan and overcame class prejudice to become the first non-white player selected for a Great Britain tour in 1954, became Rugby League's first ever knight for his services to the game.

Parliament of the United Kingdom
Preceded by Conor McGinn	Member of Parliament for St Helens North; 2024–present	Incumbent
