= Francis John Worsley Roughton =

Francis John Worsley Roughton FRS (6 June 1899 – 26 April 1972) was an English physiologist and biochemist. He began to conduct experiments to study the reactions involving haemoglobin and oxygen and went on to make pioneering studies of blood biochemistry and gas interaction kinetics. Along with Hamilton Hartridge, he developed continuous monitoring approaches to study liquid-gas binding reactions and enzyme kinetics.

Roughton was born in Kettering and came from a family of physicians. Born with congenital tachycardia, he went to study science at Winchester and Trinity College, Cambridge. Because of his heart condition he was not recruited into World War I. At Cambridge he decided not to follow the family line and began to study physiology after being influenced by Joseph Barcroft. His first research was based on his own heart condition. His research interest was on the absorption of oxygen from the lungs to the blood. In 1923 Roughton became fellow at Trinity College and a lecturer in biochemistry. Another student of Barcroft, Hamilton Hartridge, developed an experimental apparatus consisting of a mixing chamber for two liquids where inflows and outflows could be controlled and studied. They devised spectroscopic techniques to examine oxygen and carbon monoxide binding with haemoglobin. They were able to determine that the reaction could progress rapidly in minute capillaries. In 1927 Roughton became lecturer in physiology and he moved on to the study of chemical kinetics involved in haemoglobin binding. In 1939, Roughton was involved in war-research related to carbon monoxide. Roughton was elected Fellow of the Royal Society in 1936. In 1947 he succeeded E. K. Rideal as Plummer professor of colloid science at Cambridge.

Roughton married physician Alice Hopkinson, daughter of a Cambridge professor married to a German from the Siemens industrialist family, in 1925. They had a son and a daughter.
