= St Helens North =

UK Parliament constituency (since 1983)

Coordinates: 53.486°N 2.714°W

St. Helens North
- County constituency for the House of Commons
- Interactive map of boundaries since 2010
- Location within North West England
- County: Merseyside
- Electorate: 76,082 (March 2020)
- Major settlements: St Helens, Billinge, Earlestown, Haydock, Newton-le-Willows and Rainford

Current constituency
- Created: 1983
- Member of Parliament: David Baines (Labour)
- Seats: One
- Created from: St Helens, Newton, Ince, Ormskirk and Huyton

St. Helens North is a constituency (Note: A borough constituency (for the purposes of election expenses and type of returning officer)) created in 1983 represented in the House of Commons of the UK Parliament by the Labour Party's David Baines since 2024. (Note: As with all constituencies, the constituency elects one Member of Parliament (MP) by the first past the post system of election at least every five years.)

== Constituency profile ==
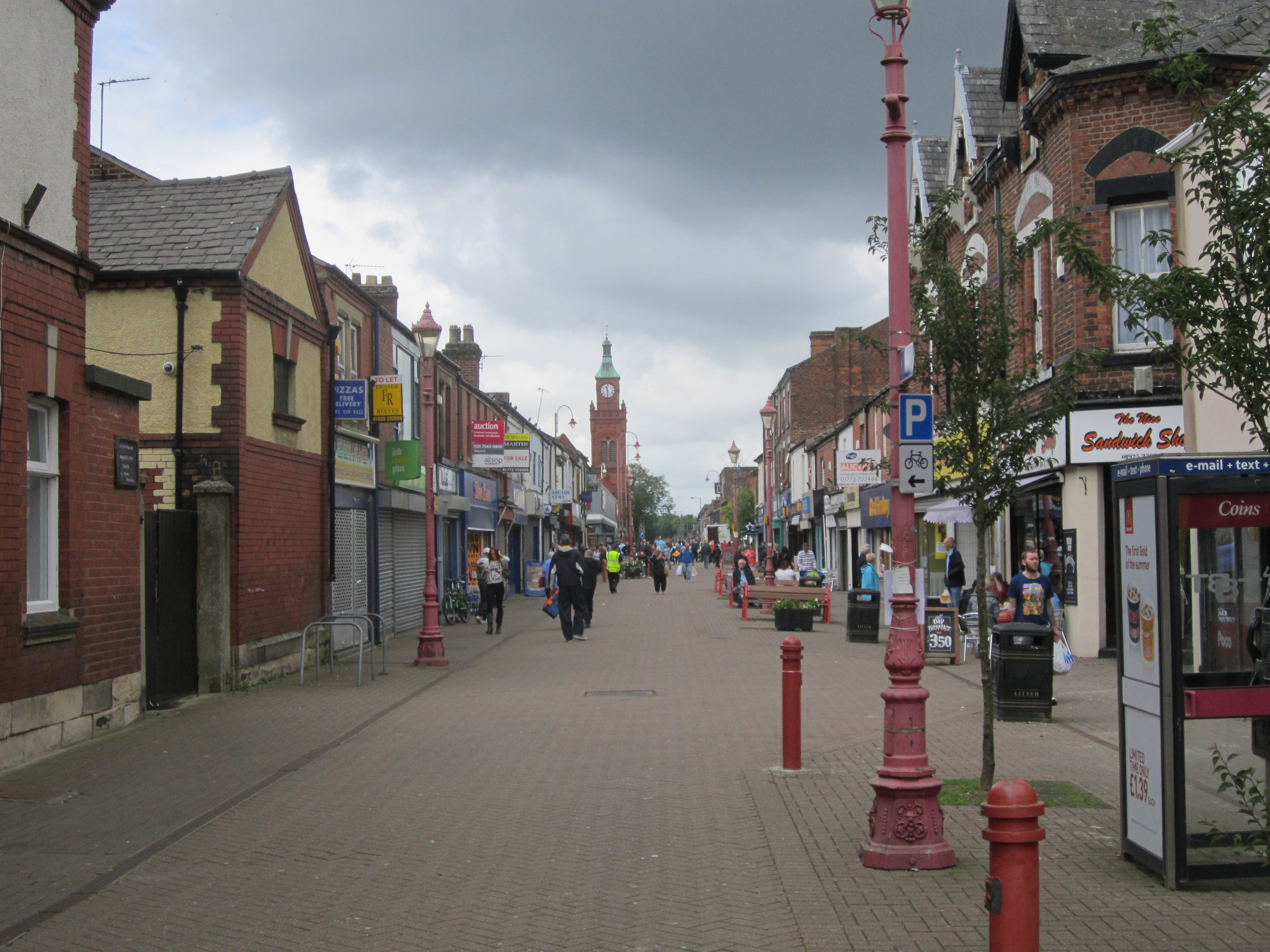
Market Street, Earlestown

St Helens North is a constituency in Merseyside in North West England. It covers the northern suburbs of the town of St Helens (Windle, Haresfinch, Laffak, Parr and Blackbrook) and the outlying towns and villages of Newton-le-Willows, Earlestown, Haydock, Garswood, Billinge and Rainford.

St Helens is a large, industrial town. It was a rural hamlet until the Industrial Revolution when it grew rapidly as a centre for coal mining, glassmaking and metalworking. The suburbs covered by this constituency are highly-deprived and mostly consist of semi-detached housing, much of which is socially rented. Most of the constituency's other settlements also have a history of coal mining. Newton-le-Willows was an important railway junction, which made it a major manufacturer of locomotives. Newton-le-Willows has average levels of wealth whilst the rural villages are mostly affluent. House prices across the constituency are generally lower than the rest of North West England, and the average price is around half the UK average.

St Helens North has a low proportion of young adults and an above-average retired population. Residents have below-average rates of income and average levels of homeownership and child poverty. They generally have low levels of education and many residents are religious; like much of Merseyside, there is a large Roman Catholic population here due to historic Irish migration. A high proportion of residents work in the business administration and transport sectors, and the percentage claiming unemployment benefits is low. White people made up 97% of the population at the 2021 census.

At the local borough council, most of the constituency is represented by Reform UK with some Labour Party and independent councillors elected in Newton-le-Willows. An estimated 59% of voters in St Helens North supported leaving the European Union in the 2016 referendum, higher than the UK-wide figure of 52%.

== Boundaries ==
=== Historic ===
1983–2010: The Metropolitan Borough of St Helens wards of Billinge and Seneley Green, Blackbrook, Broad Oak, Haydock, Moss Bank, Newton East, Newton West, Rainford, and Windle.

2010–2022: As above, subject to changes in the local authority ward structure, with Parr replacing Broad Oak, Newton East renamed Newton, and Newton West becoming Earlestown.

=== Current ===
Following a further local government boundary review coming into effect in May 2022, which did not change the constituency boundaries, the Newton and Earlestown wards reverted back to Newton-le-Willows East and Newton-le-Willows West respectively. The constituency now comprises the following wards of the Borough of St Helens:

- Billinge & Seneley Green; Blackbrook; Haydock; Moss Bank; Newton-le-Willows East; Newton-le-Willows West; Parr; Rainford; Windle; and a very small part of Sutton South East.

The 2023 review of Westminster constituencies, which was based on the ward structure in place at 1 December 2020, left the boundaries unchanged.

The constituency is one of two covering the Metropolitan Borough, the other being St Helens South and Whiston. It includes the north of the town of St Helens, and Billinge, Seneley Green, Earlestown, Blackbrook, Haydock, Newton-le-Willows and Rainford.

== History ==
Results of the winning party

The constituency was created in 1983, primarily replacing parts of the St Helens and Newton constituencies, both of which had been held by the Labour Party since 1935. Candidates fielded by Labour have won this seat at every general election – except for 1983, by an absolute majority. Their vote share ranged from 47.9% (1983) to 64.9% (1997).

The constituency was first won by the former Newton MP John Evans and from 1997 to 2015 by David Watts, a former council leader. His successor was Connor McGinn. In December 2022, McGinn was suspended by the Labour Party but continued to sit as an independent MP until he stood down at the 2024 general election, when the seat was won by Labour's David Baines.

Opposition parties

The Conservative Party have fielded the runner-up candidate in every election except 2005 (Liberal Democrats) and 2024 (Reform UK). Neither the Liberal Democrats nor the Green candidate won 5% of the vote in 2015 to retain their deposits. The third place in 2015 was taken by the UKIP candidate, Smith, who narrowly gained more than the national average swing through a swing of 10.4%. (Note: UKIP's swing nationally was +9.5% in 2015) In 2017, all three of these parties lost their deposit. In 2019, the Brexit Party won 11.3% of the vote, which it doubled to 22.5% in 2024, standing under its new name of Reform UK.

Turnout

Turnout has ranged from 77.4% in 1992 to 52.7% in 2001.

== Members of Parliament ==
Election	Member	Party	Notes
1983	John Evans	Labour	Member for Newton (1974–1983)
1997	Dave Watts	Labour	Chair of the Parliamentary Labour Party (2012–2015)
2015	Conor McGinn	Labour	
2022	Conor McGinn	Independent	
2024	David Baines	Labour	

== Elections ==
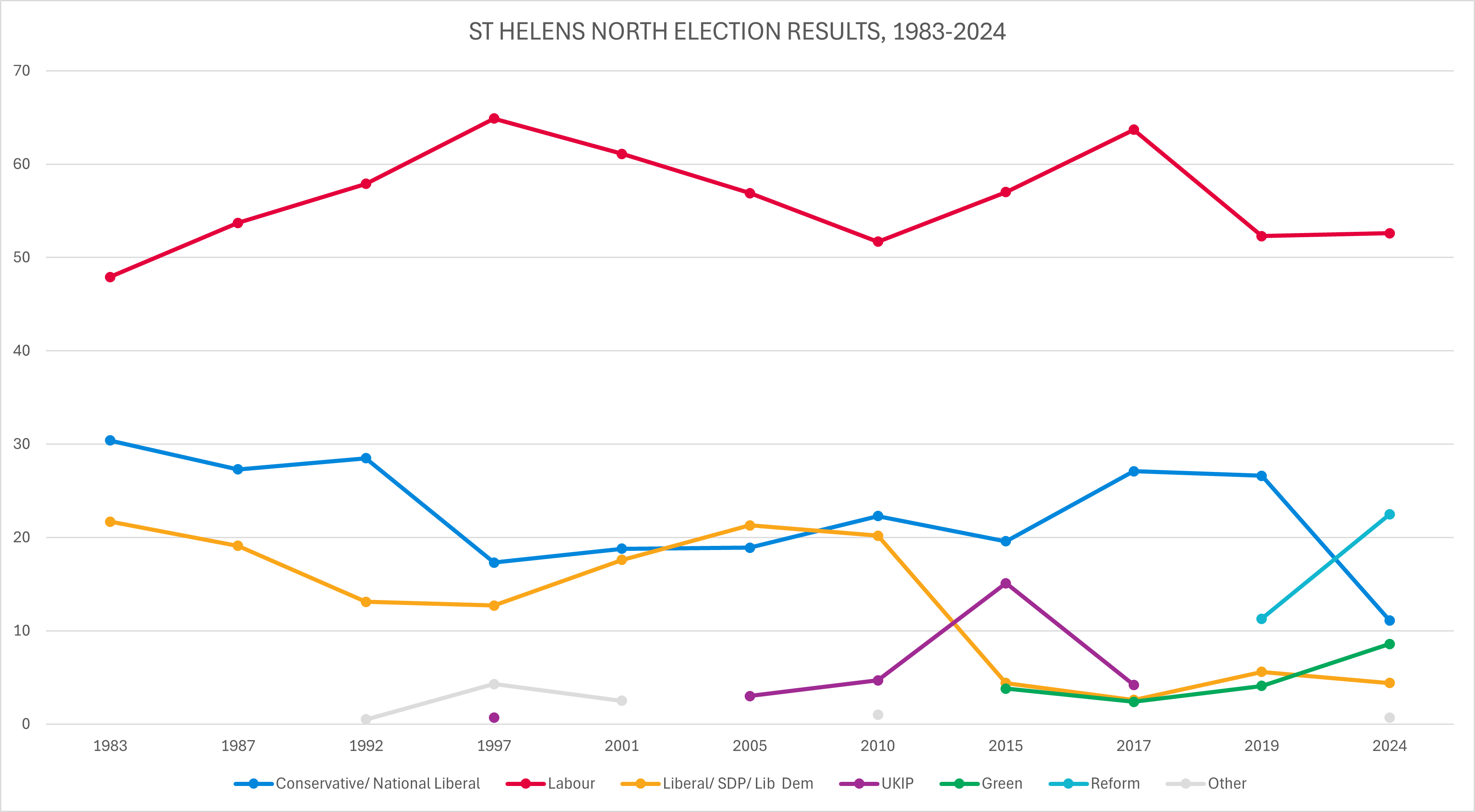
Election results 1983–2024

=== Elections in the 2020s ===
General election 2024: St Helens North
Party	Candidate	Votes	%	±%
Labour	David Baines	21,284	52.6	+0.3
Reform	Malcolm Webster	9,115	22.5	+11.2
Conservative	Jayne Rear	4,507	11.1	−15.5
Green	Daniel Thomas	3,495	8.6	+4.5
Liberal Democrats	Pat Moloney	1,799	4.4	−1.2
English Constitution Party	Joe Greenhalgh	274	0.7	New
Majority		12,169	30.1	+4.4
Turnout		40,474	53.6	−8.9
Registered electors				
Labour hold		Swing		

=== Elections in the 2010s ===
General election 2019: St Helens North
Party	Candidate	Votes	%	±%
Labour	Conor McGinn	24,870	52.3	−11.4
Conservative	Joel Charles	12,661	26.6	−0.5
Brexit Party	Malcolm Webster	5,396	11.3	New
Liberal Democrats	Pat Moloney	2,668	5.6	+3.0
Green	David Van Der Burg	1,966	4.1	+1.7
Majority		12,209	25.7	−10.9
Turnout		47,561	62.9	−3.1
Registered electors				
Labour hold		Swing	−5.4	

General election 2017: St Helens North
Party	Candidate	Votes	%	±%
Labour	Conor McGinn	32,012	63.7	+6.7
Conservative	Jackson Ng	13,606	27.1	+7.5
UKIP	Peter Peers	2,097	4.2	−10.9
Liberal Democrats	Tom Morrison	1,287	2.6	−1.8
Green	Rachel Parkinson	1,220	2.4	−1.4
Majority		18,406	36.6	−0.8
Turnout		50,222	66.0	+4.5
Registered electors				
Labour hold		Swing	−0.4	

General election 2015: St Helens North
Party	Candidate	Votes	%	±%
Labour	Conor McGinn	26,378	57.0	+5.3
Conservative	Paul Richardson	9,087	19.6	−2.7
UKIP	Ian Smith	6,983	15.1	+10.4
Liberal Democrats	Denise Aspinall	2,046	4.4	−15.8
Green	Elizabeth Ward	1,762	3.8	New
Majority		17,291	37.4	+8.0
Turnout		46,256	61.5	+1.7
Registered electors				
Labour hold		Swing	+4.0	

General election 2010: St Helens North
Party	Candidate	Votes	%	±%
Labour	David Watts	23,041	51.7	−5.6
Conservative	Paul Greenall	9,940	22.3	+3.5
Liberal Democrats	John Beirne	8,992	20.2	−0.7
UKIP	Gary Robinson	2,100	4.7	+1.8
Socialist Labour	Stephen Whatham	483	1.0	New
Majority		13,101	29.4	−7.1
Turnout		44,556	59.8	+2.0
Registered electors		74,985		–0.2
Labour hold		Swing	−4.6	

2005 notional result
Party	Vote	%
Labour	23,993	57.4
Liberal Democrats	8,728	20.9
Conservative	7,884	18.8
UKIP	1,231	2.9
Turnout	41,836	55.7
Electorate	75,121	

=== Elections in the 2000s ===
General election 2005: St Helens North
Party	Candidate	Votes	%	±%
Labour	David Watts	22,329	56.9	−4.2
Liberal Democrats	John Beirne	8,367	21.3	+3.7
Conservative	Paul Oakley	7,410	18.9	+0.1
UKIP	Sylvia Hall	1,165	3.0	New
Majority		13,962	35.6	−6.7
Turnout		39,271	57.8	+5.1
Registered electors				
Labour hold		Swing	−4.0	

General election 2001: St Helens North
Party	Candidate	Votes	%	±%
Labour	David Watts	22,977	61.1	−3.8
Conservative	Simon Pearce	7,076	18.8	+1.5
Liberal Democrats	John Beirne	6,609	17.6	+4.9
Socialist Labour	Stephen Whatham	939	2.5	+0.8
Majority		15,901	42.3	−5.3
Turnout		37,601	52.7	−16.2
Registered electors				
Labour hold		Swing		

=== Elections in the 1990s ===
General election 1997: St Helens North
Party	Candidate	Votes	%	±%
Labour	David Watts	31,953	64.9	+7.0
Conservative	Pelham Walker	8,536	17.3	−11.2
Liberal Democrats	John Beirne	6,270	12.7	−0.4
Referendum	David Johnson	1,276	2.6	New
Socialist Labour	Ron Waugh	833	1.7	New
UKIP	Richard Rubin	363	0.7	New
Majority		23,417	47.6	+18.2
Turnout		49,231	68.9	−8.5
Registered electors				
Labour hold		Swing		

General election 1992: St Helens North
Party	Candidate	Votes	%	±%
Labour	John Evans	31,930	57.9	+4.2
Conservative	Brendan Anderson	15,686	28.5	+1.2
Liberal Democrats	John Beirne	7,224	13.1	−6.0
Natural Law	Anne Lynch	287	0.5	New
Majority		16,244	29.4	+3.0
Turnout		55,127	77.4	+1.1
Registered electors				
Labour hold		Swing	+1.5	

=== Elections in the 1980s ===
General election 1987: St Helens North
Party	Candidate	Votes	%	±%
Labour	John Evans	28,989	53.7	+5.8
Conservative	Melinda Libby	14,729	27.3	−3.1
Liberal	Neil Derbyshire	10,300	19.1	−2.6
Majority		14,260	26.4	+8.9
Turnout		54,018	76.3	+1.8
Registered electors				
Labour hold		Swing	+4.4	

General election 1983: St Helens North
Party	Candidate	Votes	%	±%
Labour	John Evans	25,334	47.9	–4.6
Conservative	Anthony Rhodes	16,075	30.4	–5.4
Liberal	Neil Derbyshire	11,525	21.7	+10.8
Majority		9,259	17.5	+0.8
Turnout		52,934	74.5	
Registered electors		71,059		
Labour hold		Swing	+0.4	

1979 notional result
Party	Vote	%
Labour	28,703	52.4
Conservative	19,581	35.9
Liberal	6,004	11.0
Others	451	0.8
Turnout	54,739	
Electorate		

== See also ==
- Parliamentary constituencies in Merseyside
