= Bessbrook =

Village in County Armagh, Northern Ireland

Coordinates: 54.19589°N 6.39433°W

Bessbrook: Irish: An Sruthán
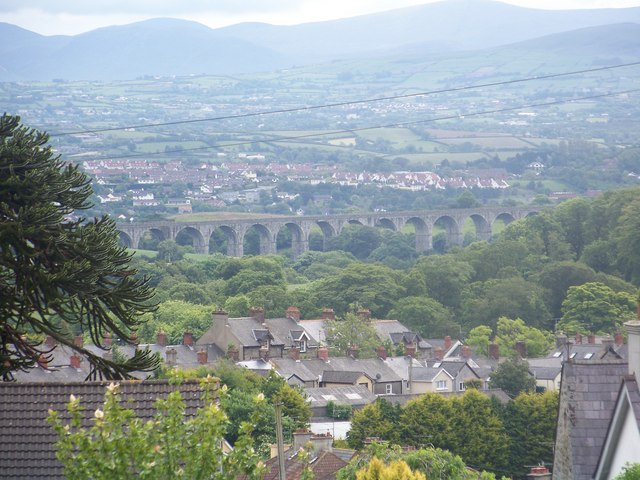
- Bessbrook from the east, with the Craigmore Viaduct in the foreground

- Location within Northern Ireland
- Population: 2,892 (2021 census)
- Irish grid reference: J048287
  - Belfast: 39 miles (63 km)
- District: Newry, Mourne and Down
- County: County Armagh
- Country: Northern Ireland
- Sovereign state: United Kingdom
- Post town: NEWRY
- Postcode district: BT35
- Dialling code: 028, +44 28
- UK Parliament: Newry & Armagh
- NI Assembly: Newry & Armagh

Bessbrook is a village in County Armagh, Northern Ireland. It lies about three miles (5 km) northwest of Newry and near the Newry bypass on the main A1 Belfast-Dublin road and Belfast-Dublin railway line. Today the village of Bessbrook straddles the three townlands of Maghernahely, Clogharevan and Maytown. Bessbrook is near Newry railway station. It had a population of 2,892 at the 2021 census. The model village of Bessbrook, County Armagh is a visible memorial to the commercial endeavours of the Richardson family over a number of generations.

During the late 20th century some of the worst violence of "the Troubles" took place near the village and it became a military zone with a large garrison. The small village became the busiest (military) heliport in Europe.

== History ==
Bessbrook is named from Elizabeth or Bess Nicholson, wife of Joseph Nicholson whose family had carried on a linen business in the district from 1806 until 1845. The 'brook' is a stream which runs through the outskirts of the village.

Bessbrook was founded by John Grubb Richardson in 1845 as a 'model village' along with the Richardson Spinning industry, with spacious streets and squares surrounding a large linen mill owned by the Quaker Richardson family. In the 18th and 19th centuries the linen industry was a significant contributor to the wealth of Quaker families in Ulster. As a social experiment it is similar to the model of the better-known Bournville company town founded by the Cadbury family near Birmingham, England. The model village of Bessbrook, provided a model for George Cadbury's “Bournville”, the famous model village in England, and predates this development by more than 30 years. The founder of Bessbrook, John G. Richardson, was a Quaker and was likely aware of other quakers such as the Malcomson Family who set up Portlaw in County Waterford. This awareness had some influence on Richardson's own schemes in Bessbrook.

Among the principles on which the village was based was a philosophy of "Three P's": there should be no public houses, no pawn shops, and consequently no need for police. It was John Grubb Richardson's belief that without a public house there would be no need for a pawn brokers or police station. To this day there are no public houses in the village. Nor are there any pawn shops, although there was a Police Service of Northern Ireland (PSNI) station until its closure in June 2012. Richardson did not at first have any confirmed ideas about the benefits of abstinence from alcohol but in the first years following setting up Bessbrook he saw the damage alcohol was doing to his employees and his business. Most of the Bessbrook population supported this policy and in the 1870s when a poll was taken the majority of the town confirmed their wish that the town would remain free of public houses and alcohol. In 1885 the hydro-electrically powered Bessbrook and Newry Tramway opened.

=== Infrastructure in the model village ===
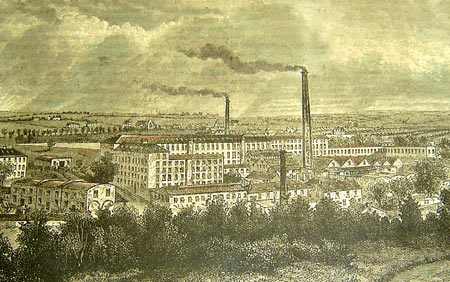
An old drawing of Richardson's Mill, Bessbrook

At one time, Bessbrook linen was among the finest in the world, and the linen mill provided most of the employment in the village. Tenement houses were constructed for the mill workers, many of which were of such good quality that they are still inhabited today. Each house also had an allotment garden for the growing of vegetables, and the area of the village where they were situated is still known as 'The Gardens', although the allotments themselves have been replaced by further housing. Most of the buildings in the village are constructed of granite, which is abundant locally.

In the frequently segregated communities of Northern Ireland, Bessbrook is an unusually mixed village, with representation of Anglican, Methodist, Presbyterian and Roman Catholic denominations. The Richardsons sometimes faced criticism that they did not employ enough Roman Catholics, however half of the employees of the linen company were Catholic. John G. Richardson facilitated the worship of Roman Catholic, Episcopalian, Presbyterian, and other communities by providing ground for their place of worship and also showed great attention to detail in insuring that the provided schooling was free of sectarianism. The village also has a Quaker meeting house. This is set in the demesne of The Woodhouse, which was inhabited by the Richardson family until the 1980s, and of Derrymore House – also a Richardson property until it was bequeathed to the National Trust; it was once the home of Isaac Corry MP. The area has been designated a historic park.

By the mid-1840s, when Bessbrook was set up as a model village it was not uncommon for Ulster workers to have housing built for them by factory owners, and Bessbrook was no different. John G. Richardson built housing for his workers and had a policy to bring poor people in, these people were often beggars and unqualified people, to work for him as he felt it would encourage these employees to improve themselves and raise themselves up to a higher standard. Each house had three to five rooms. There was a school in Bessbrook, the pupils of which seemed to be clean, intelligent and eager to learn. This school was funded by the parents who gave one penny to send their child there and by Bessbrook Spinning Co. who gave £100 to supplement government funding. There was a dispensary in the town and the workers subscribed to a medical club which was supplemented by donations from Bessbrook Spinning Co. which supported a doctor. There was a Temperance Hotel which acted as a social centre where English and Irish Newspapers could be bought, draughts and chess could be played, and people could indulge in smoking. The town boasted a Co-Operative store, a refreshment hall for travelling workers, a farm supplying milk, as well as allotments.

Following James N. Richardson III taking over from his father, John G. Richardson, withdrawing from management of the business, John G. Richardson busied himself with other projects which promoted schemes that would improve the life of the People in Bessbrook. These projects included the town hall, which provided a library and a room which facilitated lectures and meetings. These projects were largely funded from John G. Richardson's personal wealth.

=== The Troubles ===
Bessbrook saw much of the worst violence in the Troubles. The linen mill was converted by the British Army into a major military base. A helicopter landing area was established to supply other military outposts in the area since road-borne movements of troops and supplies were vulnerable to landmine attack. At one stage the little village was reportedly the busiest helicopter airport in Europe.

Nine of the ten Protestants murdered by the Provisional Irish Republican Army in the Kingsmill massacre were from Bessbrook.

The end of the Troubles, following the signing of the Good Friday Agreement in 1998, has led to some recovery for the village. Traffic restrictions have been relaxed and the visible security presence has been reduced. On 25 June 2007 the British Army withdrew their military presence from Bessbrook and closed all of their facilities, marking an end to Operation Banner in the South Armagh region. It was confirmed that the local police station would be disposed of by 2009, one of 26 stations that the Police Service of Northern Ireland announced would be closing due to cost efficiency measures. It later closed permanently in 2012 and the site was put up for sale in 2013.

== Places of interest ==
On the outskirts of the village is John Macneill's Craigmore Viaduct, known locally as the Eighteen Arches, built in 1851. The viaduct still carries the Dublin-Belfast railway line and with eighteen, (60 ft) twenty metre high arches, spanning about quarter of a mile (500 m), it was for a long time the longest bridge in Ireland. It is constructed from local granite.

Derrymore House, a National Trust property open to the public, is nearby. It is an 18th-century thatched house set in over 100 acres (0.40 km^{2}) of parkland and woodland. The Act of Union was drafted in the drawing room of the house in 1800.

== Sport ==
Bessbrook United F.C. is an intermediate football club based in the town. They were founded in 1990 as a phoenix club to Bessbrook Athletic. They play in the Mid-Ulster Football League. They have won its top division to advance into the NIFL Premier Intermediate League.

== Demography ==
Bessbrook is classified as an Intermediate Settlement by the Northern Ireland Statistics and Research Agency (NISRA), i.e. with a population between 2,500 and 4,999.

=== 2011 census ===
On census day in 2011, 27 March 2011, there were 2,750 people living in Bessbrook. Of these:

- 22.91% were aged under 16 years and 14.76% were aged 65 and over
- 50.58% of the population were male and 49.42% were female
- 79.56% were from a Catholic background and 18.00% were from a 'Protestant and Other Christian (including Christian related)' background
- 18.58% indicated that they had a British national identity, 51.35% had an Irish national identity and 31.13% had a Northern Irish national identity. Respondents could select more than one national identity.

=== 2021 census ===
On the date of the 2021 census, 21 March 2021, there were 2,892 people living in Bessbrook. Of these:

- 80.01% were from a Catholic background and 14.42% were from a 'Protestant and Other Christian (including Christian related)' background.
- 15.84% indicated that they had a British national identity, 60.86% had an Irish national identity and 23.24% had a Northern Irish national identity. Respondents could select more than one national identity.

== Education ==
Schools in the area include Bessbrook Primary School, St. Joseph's Primary School, St. Paul's High School and St. Peter's Primary School, Cloughreagh.

== Notable people ==
- Dominic Bradley – former Member of the Legislative Assembly
- Eddie Carroll (1901–1975) – Irish footballer
- Samuel George Hobson (1870–1940) – founder member of Independent Labour Party
- Danny Kennedy – Unionist politician and former Deputy Speaker of the Northern Ireland Assembly
- Conor McGinn – Labour MP and Shadow Minister
- John Grubb Richardson (1813–1891) – linen merchant, industrialist and philanthropist who founded the village
