= Endorsements in the 2015 Labour Party leadership election (UK) =

- 2015 leadership election • Endorsements
- 2016 leadership election • Endorsements
- 2020 leadership election • Endorsements

The following list contains a run down of politicians, individuals, Constituency Labour Parties, trade unions (both Labour Party affiliated and not), socialist societies, newspapers, magazines and other organisations that endorsed a candidate in the 2015 leadership election

== Labour politicians ==
=== Andy Burnham ===
- David Blunkett, former Home Secretary (2001–2004)
- Lord Falconer of Thoroton, former Shadow Lord Chancellor (2015–2016)
- Theresa Griffin, MEP for North West England
- Afzal Khan, MEP for North West England
- Neil Kinnock, former Leader of the Opposition and former Leader of the Labour Party (1983–1992)
- Lord Levy, businessman, Labour Party fundraiser
- John Prescott, former Deputy Prime Minister (1997–2007) and former Deputy Leader of the Labour Party (1994–2007)
- Peter Soulsby, former MP and current Mayor of Leicester (2011–present)
- Catherine Stihler, MEP for Scotland
- Glenis Willmott, MEP for the East Midlands and Leader of the European Parliamentary Labour Party

=== Yvette Cooper ===
- Gordon Brown, former Prime Minister of the United Kingdom and former Leader of the Labour Party (2007–2010)
- Richard Corbett, MEP for Yorkshire and the Humber
- Seb Dance, MEP for London
- Anneliese Dodds, MEP for South East England
- Neena Gill, MEP for the West Midlands
- Richard Howitt, MEP for the East of England
- Alan Johnson, former Shadow Chancellor (2010–2011) and former Home Secretary (2009–2010)
- Jude Kirton-Darling, MEP for North East England
- Richard Leese, current Leader of Manchester City Council (1996–present)
- Clare Moody, MEP for South West England
- Claude Moraes, MEP for London
- David Martin, MEP for Scotland
- Linda McAvan, MEP for Yorkshire and the Humber
- Rhodri Morgan, former First Minister of Wales (2000–2009)
- Siôn Simon, MEP for the West Midlands
- Derek Vaughan, MEP for Wales
- Kezia Dugdale, Leader of the Scottish Labour Party (2015–2017)
- Ian Murray, Shadow Secretary of State for Scotland (2015–2016), MP for Edinburgh South

=== Jeremy Corbyn ===
- Lucy Anderson, MEP for London
- Mick Antoniw, Member of the Welsh Assembly for Pontypridd
- Jennette Arnold, Chair of London Assembly and AM for North East
- Katy Clark, former Scottish Labour MP for North Ayrshire and Arran
- Tam Dalyell, former Father of the House of Commons (2001–2005)
- Mark Drakeford, Member of the Welsh Assembly for Cardiff West.
- David Drew, former MP for Stroud
- Neil Findlay, MSP for Lothian
- Mike Hedges, Member of the Welsh Assembly for Swansea East
- Cara Hilton, Member of the Scottish Parliament for Dunfermline (Initial endorsement of Andy Burnham withdrawn)
- Ken Livingstone, former Mayor of London (2000–2008) (Initial endorsement of Andy Burnham withdrawn)
- Jenny Manson, former councillor for Colindale in Barnet
- Stan Newens, former MP and MEP
- Elaine Smith, MSP for Coatbridge and Chryston
- Julie Ward, MEP for North West England
- Chris Williamson, former MP for Derby North
- Christian Wolmar, candidate for the Labour Party's nomination for Mayor of London in the 2016 election

=== Liz Kendall ===
- Hilary Armstrong, former Chief Whip (2001–2006)
- Paul Brannen, MEP for North East England
- Charles Clarke, former Home Secretary (2004–2006)
- Alistair Darling, former Chancellor of the Exchequer (2007–2010)
- Lord Glasman, life peer in the House of Lords and founder of Blue Labour
- Patricia Hewitt, former Secretary of State for Health (2005–2007)
- Mary Honeyball, MEP for London
- Lord Hutton of Furness, former Secretary of State for Defence (2008–2009)
- Alan Milburn, former Secretary of State for Health (1993–2003)
- lord Reid of Cardowan, former Home Secretary (2006–2007)
- David Miliband, former Foreign Secretary (2007–2010) and current CEO of International Rescue Committee (2013–present)
- Jim Murphy, former leader of the Scottish Labour Party (2014-2015)
- Jacqui Smith, former Home Secretary (2007–2009)
- Baroness Taylor of Bolton, former Chief Whip (1998–2001)

== Individuals ==
=== Andy Burnham ===
- Charlie Condou, actor and writer
- Steve Coogan, actor and comedian
- Liam Fray, frontman of indie rock band Courteeners
- Clare Gerada, general practitioner and former Chair of the Council of the Royal College of General Practitioners (2010–2013)
- Eddie Izzard, actor and comedian
- Sally Lindsay, actress and television presenter
- Abby Tomlinson, founder and leader of the Milifandom
- David Walliams, comedian, actor and author

=== Yvette Cooper ===
- Dan Hodges, journalist, blogger and Daily Telegraph columnist
- Sarah Solemani, actress and playwright
- Polly Toynbee, journalist and Guardian columnist
- Robert Webb, comedian, actor and writer

=== Jeremy Corbyn ===
- Bill Bailey, comedian
- Sean Bean, actor
- Mary Beard, classical scholar and Cambridge don
- Moazzam Begg, former extrajudicial detainee
- Alan Bennett, playwright, screenwriter, actor and author
- Danny DeVito, actor
- Danny Dorling, social geographer
- Laurence Dreyfus, musicologist
- Erin Belieu, poet
- Ian Birchall, Marxist historian, translator and author
- Billy Bragg, singer-songwriter and left-wing activist
- Russell Brand, comedian, actor and political activist
- Charlotte Church, singer-songwriter and television presenter
- Piers Corbyn, weather forecaster, political activist and brother of Jeremy Corbyn
- Simon Deakin, Professor of Law at the Faculty of Law, Cambridge
- Brian Eno, musician and composer
- Cristina Fernández de Kirchner, President of Argentina
- Alec Finlay, artist
- Keith Flett, socialist historian and political activist
- Martin Freeman, actor
- George Galloway, Leader of the Respect Party (2013–2016), broadcaster and former MP for Bradford West (2012–2015)
- Derek Hatton, former Deputy Leader of Liverpool City Council, member of the Labour Party and Trotskyist Militant group
- Julie Hesmondhalgh, actress
- Susan Himmelweit, economist, Emeritus Professor of Economics for the Open University
- Rufus Hound, comedian, actor and presenter
- Pablo Iglesias Turrión, current Leader of Podemos (2014–present) and former political science lecturer at the Complutense University of Madrid
- Helen Ivory, poet and artist
- Bianca Jagger, social and human rights advocate
- Selma James, feminist writer
- Owen Jones, author, Guardian columnist and political activist (Initial draft endorsement of Lisa Nandy withdrawn)
- Steve Keen, Economics Professor at Kingston University, author
- Shia LaBeouf, actor
- Costas Lapavitsas, Popular Unity (formerly Syriza) Member of the Hellenic Parliament (2015–present) and economics professor at the School of Oriental and African Studies
- Ken Loach, film and television director
- Josie Long, comedian
- Caroline Lucas, former Leader of the Green Party (2008–2012) and current MP for Brighton Pavilion (2010–2024)
- Paul Mackney, trade unionist, political activist and former General Secretary of the National Association of Teachers in Further and Higher Education
- Miriam Margolyes, actress
- Ian Martin, comedy writer and columnist for The Guardian
- Francesca Martinez, comedian and writer
- Mark McGowan, performance artist and YouTube personality
- Seumas Milne, columnist and associate editor of The Guardian
- George Monbiot, writer and environmental and political activist
- Nicholas Murray, biographer and poet
- Phyll Opoku-Gyimah, co-founder and executive director of UK Black Pride
- Ilan Pappé, historian and socialist activist
- Maxine Peake, actress
- Laurie Penny, best-selling feminist writer and journalist
- Grayson Perry, contemporary artist
- Pascale Petit, poet
- Tom Pickard, poet and documentary film maker
- Kate Pickett, Professor of Epidemiology at the University of York
- Daniel Radcliffe, actor
- Michael Rosen, children's novelist and poet
- Jolyon Rubinstein, actor, writer, producer and director, best known for writing and performing on The Revolution Will Be Televised
- Alfredo Saad-Filho, economist, Professor at the University of London
- Michael Schmidt, poet, author and scholar
- Will Self, author, journalist, political commentator and television personality
- Avi Shlaim, historian and Emeritus Professor of International Relations at the University of Oxford
- Lord Skidelsky, economics historian and author
- Harry Leslie Smith, writer and political commentator
- Guy Standing, economist, professor of Development Studies at the School of Oriental and African Studies
- Joseph Stiglitz, economist and Nobel Economic Prize laureate (2001)
- Mark Serwotka, General Secretary of the Public and Commercial Services Union
- Peter Tatchell, LGBT and human rights activist
- David Thacker, theatre-director
- Emma Thompson, actress, comedian and author
- Yanis Varoufakis, Greek economist, academic and politician and a Syriza member of the Hellenic Parliament (MP) for Athens B
- Hilary Wainwright, sociologist, socialist feminist, magazine editor and political activist
- Dave Ward, General Secretary of the Communication Workers Union
- Rory Waterman, poet
- John Weeks, economist, Emeritus Professor at the University of London
- Richard G. Wilkinson, Professor Emeritus of Social Epidemiology at the University of Nottingham
- Zoe Williams, writer and journalist
- Walter Wolfgang, peace activist

=== Liz Kendall ===
- David Aaronovitch, journalist
- Nick Cohen, journalist
- Philip Collins, journalist
- Rod Liddle, journalist
- John Mills, businessman and party donor
- John Rentoul, journalist
- Dave Rowntree, Blur drummer, solicitor, animator, and political activist

== Constituency Labour Parties ==
Candidate	Constituency	CLP nominations	Share	Map
Jeremy Corbyn	Islington North	152	23.53%	
Andy Burnham	Leigh	111	17.18%	
Yvette Cooper	Normanton, Pontefract and Castleford	109	16.87%	
Liz Kendall	Leicester West	18	2.79%	
Undeclared		256	39.63%	

=== Andy Burnham ===
Burnham received the nominations of 111 CLPs.

- Aldershot CLP
- Ayr CLP
- Banff and Buchan CLP
- Barnsley East CLP
- Barrow and Furness CLP
- Basildon and Billericay CLP
- Beckenham CLP
- Bexleyheath and Crayford CLP
- Bishop Auckland CLP
- Blackley and Broughton CLP
- Blaydon CLP
- Blyth Valley CLP
- Bolton South East CLP
- Bolton West CLP
- Bootle CLP
- Brentwood and Ongar CLP
- Bristol East CLP
- Bristol North West CLP
- Burton and Uttoxeter CLP
- Carmarthen West and South Pembrokeshire CLP
- Carrick, Cumnock and Doon Valley CLP
- Chatham and Aylesford CLP
- Cheadle CLP
- Clackmannanshire and Dunblane CLP
- Congleton CLP
- Copeland CLP
- Cumbernauld and Kilsyth CLP
- Dartford CLP
- Derby South CLP
- Don Valley CLP
- Dudley North CLP
- Dudley South CLP
- Dunfermline CLP
- Ealing Southall CLP
- East Kilbride CLP
- East Surrey CLP
- Eastbourne CLP
- Eastwood CLP
- Epsom and Ewell CLP
- Finchley and Golders Green CLP
- Folkestone and Hythe CLP
- Forest of Dean CLP
- Glasgow Provan CLP
- Glasgow Shettleston CLP
- Glasgow Southside CLP
- Gloucester CLP
- Halesowen and Rowley Regis CLP
- Halton CLP
- Hamilton, Larkhall and Stonehouse CLP
- Harlow CLP
- Heywood and Middleton CLP
- Hornchurch and Upminster CLP
- Jarrow CLP
- Kingston upon Hull East CLP
- Kingswood CLP
- Knowsley CLP
- Lancaster and Fleetwood CLP
- Leigh CLP
- Liverpool Walton CLP
- Liverpool West Derby CLP
- Maidenhead CLP
- Makerfield CLP
- Manchester Central CLP
- Mansfield CLP
- Mid Sussex CLP
- Mid Worcestershire CLP
- Middlesbrough CLP
- Midlothian South CLP
- Morecambe and Lunesdale CLP
- New Forest West CLP
- Newcastle-under-Lyme CLP
- North Swindon CLP
- North Tyneside CLP
- North West Leicestershire CLP
- Northern Ireland CLP
- Oldham East and Royton CLP
- Paisley CLP
- Pontypridd CLP
- Poplar and Limehouse CLP
- Pudsey CLP
- Redditch CLP
- Rochester and Strood CLP
- Romford CLP
- Ruislip, Northwood and Pinner CLP
- Rutherglen CLP
- Sefton Central CLP
- Sheffield Brightside and Hillsborough CLP
- Sheffield South East CLP
- Slough CLP
- South Leicestershire CLP
- South Shields CLP
- South West Devon CLP
- Southport CLP
- St Helens North CLP
- Stockton North CLP
- Stoke South CLP
- Strathkelvin and Bearsden CLP
- Telford CLP
- Torfaen CLP
- Tunbridge Wells CLP
- Uddingston and Bellshill CLP
- Wansbeck CLP
- Warrington North CLP
- West Lancashire CLP
- Wirral South CLP
- Woking CLP
- Wolverhampton North East CLP
- Workington CLP
- Worsley and Eccles South CLP
- Wrexham CLP
- Wyre Forest CLP

=== Yvette Cooper ===
Cooper received the nominations of 109 CLPs.

- Aberavon CLP
- Aberdeenshire West CLP
- Altrincham and Sale West CLP
- Angus South CLP
- Argyll and Bute CLP
- Basingstoke CLP
- Bassetlaw CLP
- Battersea CLP
- Birmingham Hodge Hill CLP
- Birmingham Perry Barr CLP
- Bognor Regis CLP
- Bolton North East CLP
- Bracknell CLP
- Brecon and Radnorshire CLP
- Bridgend CLP
- Bromsgrove CLP
- Broxbourne CLP
- Bury North CLP
- Bury South CLP
- Caerphilly CLP
- Carshalton and Wallington CLP
- Chelmsford CLP
- Chelsea and Fulham CLP
- Clydebank and Milngavie CLP
- Chesham and Amersham CLP
- Chippenham CLP
- Chipping Barnet CLP
- Christchurch CLP
- Colchester CLP
- Coventry South CLP
- Crawley CLP
- Cunninghame South CLP
- Delyn CLP
- Dumfries and Galloway CLP
- Ealing Central and Acton CLP
- Edinburgh East CLP
- Erewash CLP
- Exeter CLP
- Garston and Halewood CLP
- Glasgow Anniesland CLP
- Glasgow Cathcart CLP
- Glasgow Kelvin CLP
- Gravesham CLP
- Great Grimsby CLP
- Greenwich and Woolwich CLP
- Hackney South and Shoreditch CLP
- Harrow West CLP
- Harrogate and Knaresborough CLP
- Hammersmith CLP
- Hampstead and Kilburn CLP
- Hendon CLP
- Hertsmere CLP
- Hexham CLP
- Hitchin and Harpenden CLP
- Inverness and Nairn CLP
- Kenilworth and Southam CLP
- Leicester East CLP
- Loughborough CLP
- Macclesfield CLP
- Manchester Withington CLP
- Morley and Outwood CLP
- Ogmore CLP
- Old Bexley and Sidcup CLP
- Newcastle East CLP
- Normanton, Pontefract and Castleford CLP
- Northampton South CLP
- Northampton North CLP
- North East Fife CLP
- Norwich South CLP
- Pendle CLP
- Plymouth Moor View CLP
- Plymouth Sutton and Devonport CLP
- Reigate CLP
- Renfrewshire South CLP
- Rochford and Southend East CLP
- Romsey and Southampton North CLP
- Runnymede and Weybridge CLP
- Rutland and Melton CLP
- Saffron Walden CLP
- Selby and Ainsty CLP
- Shipley CLP
- Sittingbourne and Sheppey CLP
- Sleaford and North Hykeham CLP
- St Albans CLP
- St Helens South and Whiston CLP
- Stevenage CLP
- Stoke Central CLP
- South Dorset CLP
- South West Norfolk CLP
- South West Surrey CLP
- Southend West CLP
- Surrey Heath CLP
- Taunton Deane CLP
- Tewkesbury CLP
- Thurrock CLP
- Tiverton and Honiton CLP
- Totnes CLP
- Tooting CLP
- Truro and Falmouth CLP
- Twickenham CLP
- Vale of Glamorgan CLP
- Warley CLP
- Warrington South CLP
- Watford CLP
- Westminster North CLP
- Wimbledon CLP
- Wirral West CLP
- Witney CLP
- Yeovil CLP

=== Jeremy Corbyn ===
Corbyn received the nominations of 152 CLPs.

- Aberdeen Central CLP
- Airdrie and Shotts CLP
- Aldridge-Brownhills CLP
- Almond Valley CLP
- Alyn and Deeside CLP
- Amber Valley CLP
- Ashfield CLP
- Ashton-under-Lyne CLP
- Aylesbury CLP
- Bath CLP
- Batley and Spen CLP
- Bedford CLP
- Berwick CLP
- Bethnal Green and Bow CLP
- Birmingham Yardley CLP
- Blaenau Gwent CLP
- Bournemouth West CLP
- Brent Central CLP
- Brent North CLP
- Bridgwater and West Somerset CLP
- Brigg and Goole CLP
- Bromley and Chislehurst CLP
- Broxtowe CLP
- Bury St Edmunds CLP
- Calder Valley CLP
- Cannock Chase CLP
- Castle Point CLP
- Central Devon CLP
- Chingford and Woodford Green CLP
- Crewe and Nantwich CLP
- Croydon Central CLP
- Croydon North CLP
- Dagenham and Rainham CLP
- Derby North CLP
- Derbyshire Dales CLP
- Devizes CLP
- Doncaster Central CLP
- Dundee City East CLP
- Dundee City West CLP
- Easington CLP
- East Devon CLP
- Edinburgh Central CLP
- Edinburgh North and Leith CLP
- Edinburgh Pentlands CLP
- Edinburgh West CLP
- Edmonton CLP
- Ellesmere Port CLP
- Elmet and Rothwell CLP
- Enfield North CLP
- Enfield Southgate CLP
- Erith and Thamesmead CLP
- Gateshead CLP
- Glasgow Maryhill and Springburn CLP
- Glasgow Pollok CLP
- Gower CLP
- Grantham and Stamford CLP
- Great Yarmouth CLP
- Greenock and Inverclyde CLP
- Hackney North and Stoke Newington CLP
- Halifax CLP
- Harborough CLP
- Harrow East CLP
- Hartlepool CLP
- Havant CLP
- Hayes and Harlington CLP
- Hemel Hempstead CLP
- Hemsworth CLP
- Holborn and St Pancras CLP
- Hornsey and Wood Green CLP
- Horsham CLP
- Ilford South CLP
- Isle of Wight CLP
- Islington North CLP
- Islington South and Finsbury CLP
- Kensington CLP
- Kilmarnock and Irvine CLP
- Kingston upon Hull North CLP
- Leeds East CLP
- Leeds North East CLP
- Leeds North West CLP
- Leeds West CLP
- Leicester South CLP
- Lewisham Deptford CLP
- Lewisham West CLP
- Leyton and Wanstead CLP
- Linlithgow CLP
- Liverpool Riverside CLP
- Luton North CLP
- Luton South CLP
- Manchester Gorton CLP
- Merthyr Tydfil and Rhymney CLP
- Mid Fife and Glenrothes CLP
- Midlothian North and Musselburgh CLP
- Motherwell and Wishaw CLP
- Newcastle Central CLP
- Newport East CLP
- North Cornwall CLP
- North Devon CLP
- North Herefordshire CLP
- North Norfolk CLP
- North Shropshire CLP
- North Somerset CLP
- North West Hampshire CLP
- Norwich North CLP
- Nottingham East CLP
- Nottingham South CLP
- Oldham East and Saddleworth CLP
- Perthshire North CLP
- Perthshire South CLP
- Peterborough CLP
- Preseli Pembrokeshire CLP
- Preston CLP
- Richmond Park CLP
- Rugby CLP
- Salford and Eccles CLP
- Scarborough and Whitby CLP
- Scunthorpe CLP
- Sherwood CLP
- Shrewsbury and Atcham CLP
- Skipton and Ripon CLP
- Somerton and Frome CLP
- South Basildon and East Thurrock CLP
- South Derbyshire CLP
- South East Cornwall CLP
- South Northamptonshire CLP
- South Ribble CLP
- South Suffolk CLP
- South West Wiltshire CLP
- Southampton Itchen CLP
- Southampton Test CLP
- St Austell and Newquay CLP
- St Ives CLP
- Stalybridge and Hyde CLP
- Stratford-on-Avon CLP
- Sunderland Central CLP
- Sutton and Cheam CLP
- Swansea East CLP
- Swansea West CLP
- Thirsk and Malton CLP
- Thornbury and Yate CLP
- Tottenham CLP
- Uxbridge and South Ruislip CLP
- Wakefield CLP
- Wallasey CLP
- Walthamstow CLP
- Warwick and Leamington CLP
- Washington and Sunderland West CLP
- Wealden CLP
- West Ham CLP
- West Suffolk CLP
- Westmorland and Lonsdale CLP
- Wolverhampton South West CLP
- Wycombe CLP
- Wythenshawe and Sale CLP
- Ynys Mon CLP

=== Liz Kendall ===
Kendall received the nominations of 18 CLPs.

- Barking CLP
- Bermondsey and Old Southwark CLP
- Camberwell and Peckham CLP
- Carmarthen East and Dinefwr CLP
- Cities of London and Westminster CLP
- Croydon South CLP
- Dulwich and West Norwood CLP
- East Ham CLP
- Ilford North CLP
- Leicester West CLP
- Lewisham East CLP
- Mitcham and Morden CLP
- Moray CLP
- Newton Abbot CLP
- Sedgefield CLP
- Streatham CLP
- Wolverhampton South East CLP
- Vauxhall CLP

=== Undeclared ===
256 CLPs did not nominate a candidate for party leader.

- Aberconwy CLP
- Aberdeen Donside CLP
- Aberdeen South and North Kincardine CLP
- Aberdeenshire East CLP
- Angus North and Mearns CLP
- Arfon CLP
- Arundel and South Downs CLP
- Ashford CLP
- Banbury CLP
- Banffshire and Buchan Coast CLP
- Barnsley Central CLP
- Beaconsfield CLP
- Beverley and Holderness CLP
- Bexhill and Battle CLP
- Birkenhead CLP
- Birmingham Edgbaston CLP
- Birmingham Erdington CLP
- Birmingham Hall Green CLP
- Birmingham Ladywood CLP
- Birmingham Northfield CLP
- Birmingham Selly Oak CLP
- Blackburn CLP
- Blackpool North and Cleveleys CLP
- Blackpool South CLP
- Bolsover CLP
- Boston and Skegness CLP
- Bosworth CLP
- Bournemouth East CLP
- Bradford East CLP
- Bradford South CLP
- Bradford West CLP
- Braintree CLP
- Brentford and Isleworth CLP
- Bridgwater and West Somerset CLP
- Brighton Kemptown CLP
- Brighton Pavilion CLP
- Bristol South CLP
- Bristol West CLP
- Broadland CLP
- Buckingham CLP
- Burnley CLP
- Caithness, Sutherland and Ross CLP
- Camborne and Redruth CLP
- Cambridge CLP
- Canterbury CLP
- Cardiff Central CLP
- Cardiff North CLP
- Cardiff South and Penarth CLP
- Cardiff West CLP
- Carlisle CLP
- Central Suffolk and Central Ipswich CLP
- Ceredigion CLP
- Charnwood CLP
- Chesterfield CLP
- Cheltenham CLP
- Chichester CLP
- Chorley CLP
- City of Chester CLP
- City of Durnham CLP
- Clacton CLP
- Cleethorpes CLP
- Clwyd South CLP
- Clwyd West CLP
- Clydesdales CLP
- Coatbridge and Chryston CLP
- Colne Valley CLP
- Corby CLP
- Coventry North East CLP
- Coventry North West CLP
- Cowdenbeath CLP
- Cunninghame North CLP
- Cynon Valley CLP
- Darlington CLP
- Daventry CLP
- Denton and Reddish CLP
- Dewsbury CLP
- Doncaster North CLP
- Dover CLP
- Dumbarton CLP
- Dunfermline CLP
- Ealing North CLP
- East Hampshire CLP
- East Lothian CLP
- East Worthing and Shoreham CLP
- East Yorkshire CLP
- Eastleigh CLP
- Eddisbury CLP
- Edinburgh South CLP
- Eltham CLP
- Epping Forest CLP
- Esher and Walton CLP
- Ettrick, Roxburgh and Berwickshire CLP
- Falkirk East CLP
- Falkirk West CLP
- Fareham CLP
- Faversham and Mid Kent CLP
- Feltham and Heston CLP
- Filton and Bradley Stoke CLP
- Fylde CLP
- Gainsborough CLP
- Gedling CLP
- Gillingham and Rainham CLP
- Gosport CLP
- Guildford CLP
- Haltemprice and Howden CLP
- Harwich and North Essex CLP
- Hastings and Rye CLP
- Hazel Grove CLP
- Henley CLP
- Hereford and South Herefordshire CLP
- Hertford and Stortford CLP
- High Peak CLP
- Houghton and Sunderland South CLP
- Hove CLP
- Huddersfield CLP
- Huntingdon CLP
- Hyndburn CLP
- Inverness and Nairn CLP
- Ipswich CLP
- Islwyn CLP
- Keighley CLP
- Kettering CLP
- Kingston upon Hull West and Hessle CLP
- Kirkcaldy CLP
- Leeds Central CLP
- Lewes CLP
- Lichfield CLP
- Lincoln CLP
- Liverpool Riverside CLP
- Liverpool Wavertree CLP
- Llanelli CLP
- Louth and Horncastle CLP
- Ludlow CLP
- Maidstone and The Weald CLP
- Maldon CLP
- Meon Valley CLP
- Meriden CLP
- Mid Bedfordshire CLP
- Mid Derbyshire CLP
- Mid Dorset and North Poole CLP
- Mid Norfolk CLP
- Middlesbrough South and East Cleveland CLP
- Milton Keynes North CLP
- Milton Keynes South CLP
- Mole Valley CLP
- Monmouth CLP
- Montgomeryshire CLP
- Na h-Eileanan an Iar CLP
- Neath CLP
- New Forest East CLP
- Newark CLP
- Newbury CLP
- Newcastle North CLP
- Newport West CLP
- North Dorset CLP
- North Durham CLP
- North East Bedfordshire CLP
- North East Cambridgeshire CLP
- North East Derbyshire CLP
- North East Hampshire CLP
- North East Hertfordshire CLP
- North East Somerset CLP
- North Thanet CLP
- North Warwickshire CLP
- North West Cambridgeshire CLP
- North West Durham CLP
- North West Norfolk CLP
- North Wiltshire CLP
- Nottingham North CLP
- Nuneaton CLP
- Orkney CLP
- Orpington CLP
- Oxford East CLP
- Oxford West and Abingdon CLP
- Penistone and Stocksbridge CLP
- Penrith and The Border CLP
- Poole CLP
- Portsmouth North CLP
- Portsmouth South CLP
- Putney CLP
- Rayleigh and Wickford CLP
- Reading East CLP
- Reading West CLP
- Redcar CLP
- Renfrewshire North and West CLP
- Rhondda CLP
- Ribble Valley CLP
- Richmond (Yorks) CLP
- Rochdale CLP
- Rossendale and Darwen CLP
- Rother Valley CLP
- Rotherham CLP
- Rushcliffe CLP
- Salisbury CLP
- Sevenoaks CLP
- Sheffield Central CLP
- Sheffield Hallam CLP
- Sheffield Heeley CLP
- Shetland CLP
- Skye, Lochaber and Badenoch CLP
- Solihull CLP
- South Cambridgeshire CLP
- South East Cambridgeshire CLP
- South Holland and The Deepings
- South Norfolk CLP
- South Staffordshire CLP
- South Swindon CLP
- South Thanet CLP
- South West Bedfordshire CLP
- South West Hertfordshire CLP
- Spelthorne CLP
- Stafford CLP
- Staffordshire Moorlands CLP
- Stirling CLP
- Stockport CLP
- Stockton South CLP
- Stoke-on-Trent CLP
- Stone CLP
- Stourbridge CLP
- Stretford and Urmston CLP
- Stroud CLP
- Suffolk Coastal CLP
- Sutton Coldfield CLP
- Tamworth CLP
- Tatton CLP
- The Cotswolds CLP
- The Wrekin CLP
- Tonbridge and Malling CLP
- Torbay CLP
- Torridge and West Devon CLP
- Tynemouth CLP
- Vale of Clwyd CLP
- Walsall North CLP
- Walsall South CLP
- Wantage CLP
- Waveney CLP
- Weaver Vale CLP
- Wellingborough CLP
- Wells CLP
- Welwyn Hatfield CLP
- Wentworth and Dearne CLP
- West Bromwich East CLP
- West Bromwich West CLP
- West Dorset CLP
- West Worcestershire CLP
- Weston-Super-Mare CLP
- Wigan CLP
- Winchester CLP
- Windsor CLP
- Witham CLP
- Wokingham CLP
- Worcester CLP
- Worthing West CLP
- Wyre and Preston North CLP
- York Central CLP
- York Outer CLP

== Affiliated trade unions ==
Candidate	Constituency	TU nominations	Share of TU membership
Jeremy Corbyn	Islington North	6	70.05%
Andy Burnham	Leigh	3	13.12%
Yvette Cooper	Normanton, Pontefract and Castleford	2	1.26%
Liz Kendall	Leicester West	0	0%
Undeclared		3	15.57%

=== Andy Burnham ===
- Union of Construction, Allied Trades and Technicians (UCATT)
- Union of Shop, Distributive and Allied Workers (USDAW)
- Musicians' Union (MU)

=== Yvette Cooper ===
- Community
- National Union of Mineworkers (NUM)

=== Jeremy Corbyn ===
- Associated Society of Locomotive Engineers and Firemen (ASLEF)
- Bakers, Food and Allied Workers' Union (BFAWU)
- Communication Workers Union (CWU)
- Transport Salaried Staffs' Association (TSSA)
- UNISON
- Unite the Union (Unite)

=== Undeclared ===
- Broadcasting, Entertainment, Communications and Theatre Union (BECTU)
- General, Municipal, Boilermakers and Allied Trade Union (GMB)
- Unity

== Non-affiliated trade unions ==
=== Jeremy Corbyn ===
- Fire Brigades Union (FBU)
- National Union of Rail, Maritime and Transport Workers (RMT)
- Prison Officers Association (POA)

== Socialist societies ==
Candidate	Constituency	SS nominations
Jeremy Corbyn	Islington North	2
Yvette Cooper	Normanton, Pontefract and Castleford	1
Liz Kendall	Leicester West	1
Andy Burnham	Leigh	0
Undeclared		18

=== Yvette Cooper ===
- Jewish Labour Movement

=== Jeremy Corbyn ===
- Socialist Educational Association
- Socialist Health Association

=== Liz Kendall ===
- Labour Party Irish Society

=== Undeclared ===
- BAME Labour
- Chinese for Labour
- Christians on the Left
- Disability Labour
- Fabian Society
- Labour Animal Welfare Society
- Labour Campaign for International Development
- LGBT Labour
- Labour Finance and Industry Group
- Labour Housing Group
- Labour Movement for Europe
- Labour Students
- Labour Women's Network
- National Union of Labour and Socialist Clubs
- Scientists for Labour
- Socialist Environment and Resources Association
- Society of Labour Lawyers
- Tamils for Labour

== Political parties ==
=== Jeremy Corbyn ===
- Podemos, left-wing political party in Spain
- Socialist Party, Trotskyist political party in England and Wales

== Organisations ==
=== Jeremy Corbyn ===
- Alliance for Workers' Liberty (AWL)
- Beard Liberation Front
- Campaign for Labour Party Democracy (CLPD)
- Communist Party of Great Britain (Provisional Central Committee)
- Disabled People Against Cuts (DPAC)
- Global Women's Strike
- Hands off Venezuela
- Labour Campaign for Free Education
- Labour CND
- Labour Party Marxists
- Labour Representation Committee (LRC)
- National Campaign Against Fees and Cuts (NCAFC)
- Oxford University Labour Club (OULC)
- Surrey Labour Students
- People's Assembly Against Austerity
- Red Labour
- Southall Black Sisters
- Stop the War Coalition (StWC)
- UK Uncut
- Workers' Power

=== Liz Kendall ===
- Progress

== Publications ==
Newspaper	General election main endorsement	Labour leadership endorsement	Notes	Link
Daily Mirror	Labour Party	Andy Burnham	Called Burnham the candidate best placed to lead the party and "the only Prime Minister-in-waiting"	
Sunday People	Labour Party	Andy Burnham	Named Burnham as the paper's choice for party leader	
Daily Record	Labour Party	Jeremy Corbyn	Backed Corbyn, saying he would "regain the trust of the country by returning to the party's core values"	
Morning Star	Labour Party	Jeremy Corbyn	Editorial called Corbyn the "only option" for the party leadership	
The Guardian	Labour Party	Yvette Cooper	Described Cooper as the person "best placed" to offer a strong vision and unite the party	
The Sun	Conservative Party	Liz Kendall	Described Kendall as "the only prayer the Labour Party have"	

Magazine	General election main endorsement	Labour leadership endorsement	Notes	Link
Red Pepper	None	Jeremy Corbyn	Editor backed Corbyn, saying he would "create a truly transformative politics"	
The Ecologist	Green Party (E&W)	Jeremy Corbyn	Endorsed Corbyn as the only candidate who is "serious about the environment and social justice"	
The Economist	Conservative Party	Liz Kendall	Endorsed Kendall saying that she remains "Labour's best chance"	
New Statesman	Labour Party	Yvette Cooper	Credited Cooper as being best to lead Labour, for her "experience of government, intellect and credibility"	
