= Endorsements in the 2016 Labour Party leadership election =

- 2015 leadership election • Endorsements
- 2016 leadership election • Endorsements
- 2020 leadership election • Endorsements

The following list contains a run down of politicians, individuals, Constituency Labour Parties, trade unions (both Labour Party affiliated and not), socialist societies, newspapers, magazines and other organisations that endorsed a candidate in the 2016 leadership election

== Summary ==
Summary of Nominations
Candidate	Constituency	PLP/EPLP Nominations	CLP Nominations	Affiliated Trade Union Nominations	Socialist Societies
Jeremy Corbyn	Islington North	21	285	8	1
Owen Smith	Pontypridd	285	53	4	3
Angela Eagle (Withdrew)	Wallasey	43	N/A	N/A	N/A

== Labour politicians ==
=== Jeremy Corbyn ===
MPs

- Diane Abbott, Shadow Health Secretary since 2016; candidate for Leader in 2010; MP for Hackney North and Stoke Newington
- Richard Burgon, Shadow Justice Secretary and Shadow Lord Chancellor since 2016; MP for Leeds East
- Dawn Butler, former Minister for Young Citizens and Youth Engagement 2009–2010; MP for Brent South 2005–2010; MP for Brent Central since 2015.
- Ronnie Campbell, MP for Blyth Valley
- Stephen Hepburn, MP for Jarrow
- Imran Hussain, Shadow Minister of State for International Development since 2016; MP for Bradford East
- Ian Lavery, Shadow Minister for Trade Unions & Civil Society since 2015; MP for Wansbeck
- Clive Lewis, Shadow Defence Secretary since 2016; MP for Norwich South
- Rebecca Long-Bailey, Shadow Chief Secretary to the Treasury; MP for Salford and Eccles
- Andy McDonald, Shadow Transport Secretary since 2016, MP for Middlesbrough
- John McDonnell, Shadow Chancellor since 2015; candidate for Leader in 2007 and 2010; MP for Hayes and Harlington (campaign manager)
- Ian Mearns, MP for Gateshead
- Grahame Morris, Shadow Communities and Local Government Secretary since 2016; MP for Easington
- Kate Osamor, Shadow International Development Secretary since 2016; MP for Edmonton
- Angela Rayner, Shadow Secretary of State for Education and Shadow Minister for Women and Equalities since 2016, MP for Ashton-under-Lyne
- Dennis Skinner, former Chairman of the Labour Party (1988–1989); MP for Bolsover
- Emily Thornberry, Shadow Foreign Secretary since 2016, MP for Islington South and Finsbury
- Jon Trickett, Shadow Secretary of State for Business since 2016; MP for Hemsworth

MEPs

- Lucy Anderson, MEP for London
- Julie Ward, MEP for North West England

Other Labour politicians

- Mick Antoniw, AM for Pontypridd
- Jennette Arnold, AM for North East
- Bill Butler, former MSP for Glasgow Anniesland
- Neil Findlay, MSP for Lothian
- Mike Hedges, Member of the Welsh Assembly for Swansea East
- Cara Hilton, former MSP for Dunfermline
- Richard Leonard, MSP for Central Scotland
- Ken Livingstone, former Mayor of London (2000–2008)
- Murad Qureshi, former London-wide Member of the London Assembly for the Labour Party
- Alex Rowley, Deputy Leader of the Scottish Labour Party since 2015; MSP for Mid Scotland and Fife
- Elaine Smith, former Deputy Presiding Officer of the Scottish Parliament; MSP for Central Scotland
- Chris Williamson, former MP for Derby North

=== Owen Smith ===
MPs

- Rosena Allin-Khan, MP for Tooting
- Margaret Beckett, former Acting Leader of the Labour Party and Leader of the Opposition (1994); former Deputy Leader of the Labour Party (1992–1994); former Foreign Secretary (2006–2007); MP for Derby South
- Hilary Benn, former Shadow Foreign Secretary (2015–2016); MP for Leeds Central
- Clive Betts, Chair of the Communities and Local Government Committee; MP for Sheffield South East
- Roberta Blackman-Woods, MP for City of Durham
- Tom Blenkinsop, MP for Middlesbrough South and East Cleveland
- Paul Blomfield, MP for Sheffield Central
- Ben Bradshaw, former Shadow Culture Secretary (2010) and former Culture Secretary (2009–2010)
- Lyn Brown, MP for West Ham
- Chris Bryant, former Shadow Leader of the House of Commons (2015–2016); MP for Rhondda
- Karen Buck, MP for Westminster North
- Richard Burden, MP for Birmingham Northfield
- Liam Byrne, former Shadow Secretary of State for Work and Pensions (2011–2013); former Chief Secretary to the Treasury (2009–2010); MP for Birmingham Hodge Hill
- Ruth Cadbury, MP for Brentford and Isleworth
- Jenny Chapman, MP for Darlington
- Vernon Coaker, former Shadow Secretary of State for Northern Ireland (2011–2013, 2015–2016), Shadow Defence Secretary (2013–2015); MP for Gedling
- Yvette Cooper, former Shadow Home Secretary (2011–2015); former Secretary of State for Work and Pensions (2009–2010); candidate for Leader in 2015 (defeated); MP for Normanton, Pontefract and Castleford
- Mary Creagh, former Shadow International Development Secretary (2014–2015); candidate for Leader in 2015 (withdrew); MP for Wakefield
- Jon Cruddas, MP for Dagenham and Rainham
- Judith Cummins, MP for Bradford South
- Alex Cunningham, MP for Stockton North
- Jim Cunningham, MP for Coventry South
- Wayne David, MP for Caerphilly
- Gloria De Piero, former Shadow Minister for Young People and Voter Registration (2015–2016); MP for Ashfield
- Michael Dugher, former Shadow Culture Secretary (2015–2016); MP for Barnsley East
- Angela Eagle, former Shadow First Secretary of State and Shadow Secretary of State for Business, Innovation and Skills (2015–2016); candidate for Leader in 2016 (withdrew); MP for Wallasey
- Maria Eagle, former Shadow Culture Secretary (2016) and former Shadow Defence Secretary (2015–2016); MP for Garston and Halewood
- Clive Efford, former Shadow Minister for Culture, Media and Sport (2011–2016); MP for Eltham
- Louise Ellman, Chair of the Transport Select Committee since 2008; MP for Liverpool Riverside
- Chris Elmore, MP for Ogmore
- Bill Esterson, MP for Sefton Central
- Caroline Flint, former Shadow Energy Secretary (2011–2015); MP for Don Valley
- Yvonne Fovargue, MP for Makerfield
- Vicky Foxcroft, MP for Lewisham Deptford
- Mike Gapes, MP for Ilford South
- Pat Glass, former Shadow Secretary of State for Education (2016); MP for North West Durham
- Roger Godsiff, MP for Birmingham Hall Green
- Helen Goodman, MP for Bishop Auckland
- Kate Green, former Shadow Minister for Women and Equalities (2015–2016); MP for Stretford and Urmston (co-campaign chair)
- Lilian Greenwood, former Shadow Transport Secretary (2015–2016); MP for Nottingham South
- Nia Griffith, former Shadow Welsh Secretary (2015–2016); MP for Llanelli
- Andrew Gwynne, Shadow Health Minister since 2011; MP for Denton and Reddish
- Louise Haigh, Shadow Minister for Digital Industries; MP for Sheffield Heeley
- David Hanson, former Minister for Security (2009–2010); MP for Delyn
- Harriet Harman, former Acting Leader of the Labour Party and Leader of the Opposition (2010; 2015); former Deputy Leader of the Labour Party (2007–2015); MP for Camberwell and Peckham
- Carolyn Harris, MP for Swansea East
- Helen Hayes, MP for Dulwich and West Norwood
- Sue Hayman, MP for Workington
- John Healey, former Shadow Minister for Housing and Planning (2010; 2015–2016); former Shadow Secretary of State for Health (2010–2011); former Minister of State for Housing and Planning (2009–2010); MP for Wentworth and Dearne
- Kate Hollern, MP for Blackburn
- Tristram Hunt, former Shadow Secretary of State for Education (2013–2015); MP for Stoke-on-Trent Central
- Rupa Huq, MP for Ealing Central and Acton
- Alan Johnson, former Shadow Chancellor (2010–2011) and former Home Secretary (2009–2010); MP for Kingston upon Hull West and Hessle
- Gerald Jones, MP for Merthyr Tydfil and Rhymney
- Graham Jones, MP for Hyndburn
- Helen Jones, MP for Warrington North
- Susan Jones, MP for Clwyd South
- Barbara Keeley, former Deputy Leader of the House of Commons (2009–2010); MP for Worsley and Eccles South
- Chris Leslie, former Shadow Chancellor (2015); MP for Nottingham East
- Emma Lewell-Buck, MP for South Shields
- Ian Lucas, Shadow Parliamentary Under Secretary of State for Business and Regulatory Reform since 2010; MP for Wrexham
- Holly Lynch, Opposition Whip since 2015; MP for Halifax
- Justin Madders, MP for Ellesmere Port and Neston
- Khalid Mahmood, MP for Birmingham Perry Barr
- Shabana Mahmood, former Shadow Chief Secretary to the Treasury (2015); MP for Birmingham Ladywood
- Seema Malhotra, former Shadow Chief Secretary to the Treasury (2015–2016); MP for Feltham and Heston
- Rob Marris, MP for Wolverhampton South West
- Chris Matheson, MP for City of Chester
- Kerry McCarthy, former Shadow Secretary of State for Environment, Food and Rural Affairs (2015–2016); MP for Bristol East
- Conor McGinn, MP for St Helens North
- Liz McInnes, MP for Heywood and Middleton
- Catherine McKinnell, former Shadow Attorney General (2015–2016); MP for Newcastle upon Tyne North
- Jim McMahon, former Leader of the Oldham Metropolitan Borough Council (2011–2016); MP for Oldham West and Royton
- Ed Miliband, former Leader of the Labour Party and Leader of the Opposition (2010–2015); MP for Doncaster North
- Jessica Morden, MP for Newport East
- Ian Murray, former Shadow Secretary of State for Scotland (2015–2016); MP for Edinburgh South
- Lisa Nandy, former Shadow Energy and Climate Change Secretary (2015–2016); MP for Wigan (co-campaign chair)
- Melanie Onn, MP for Great Grimsby
- Chi Onwurah, MP for Newcastle upon Tyne Central
- Albert Owen, MP for Ynys Môn
- Teresa Pearce, MP for Erith and Thamesmead
- Toby Perkins, former Shadow Minister of State for the Armed Forces (2015–2016); MP for Chesterfield
- Matthew Pennycook, MP for Greenwich and Woolwich
- Lucy Powell, former Shadow Secretary of State for Education (2015–2016); MP for Manchester Central
- Steve Reed, MP for Croydon North
- Christina Rees, MP for Neath
- Rachel Reeves, former Shadow Secretary of State for Work and Pensions (2013–2015); MP for Leeds West
- Emma Reynolds, former Shadow Communities Secretary (2015); MP for Wolverhampton North East
- Jonathan Reynolds, former Shadow Minister for Transport (2015–2016); MP for Stalybridge and Hyde
- Marie Rimmer, MP for St Helens South and Whiston
- Paula Sherriff, MP for Dewsbury
- Andy Slaughter, former Shadow Justice Minister (2010–2016); MP for Hammersmith
- Andrew Smith, former Secretary of State for Work and Pensions (2002–2004); former Chief Secretary to the Treasury (1999–2002); MP for Oxford East
- Jeff Smith, MP for Manchester Withington
- Nick Smith, MP for Blaenau Gwent
- Keir Starmer, former Director of Public Prosecutions (England and Wales) (2008–2013); MP for Holborn and St Pancras
- Jo Stevens, Shadow Solicitor General since 2015; MP for Cardiff Central
- Gareth Thomas, candidate for Mayor of London in 2015; former Shadow Minister for Foreign Affairs (2013–2015); Chair of the Co-operative Party since 2001; MP for Harrow West
- Nick Thomas-Symonds, MP for Torfaen
- Stephen Timms, former Shadow Secretary of State for Work and Pensions (2015); former Chief Secretary to the Treasury (2006–2007); MP for East Ham
- Anna Turley, MP for Redcar
- Karl Turner, former Shadow Attorney General (2016); MP for Kingston upon Hull East
- Stephen Twigg, Chair of the International Development Select Committee since 2015; former Shadow Secretary of State for Education (2011–2013); MP for Liverpool West Derby
- Chuka Umunna, former Shadow Business Secretary (2011–2015); candidate for Leader in 2015 (withdrew); MP for Streatham
- Alan Whitehead, MP for Southampton Test
- Iain Wright, Chair of the Business, Innovation and Skills Select Committee since 2015; MP for Hartlepool
- Daniel Zeichner, Shadow Minister for Transport; MP for Cambridge

MEPs

- Paul Brannen, MEP for North East England
- Richard Corbett, MEP for Yorkshire and the Humber
- Seb Dance, MEP for London
- Theresa Griffin, MEP for North West England
- Richard Howitt, MEP for the East of England
- David Martin, MEP for Scotland
- Linda McAvan, MEP for Yorkshire and the Humber
- Catherine Stihler, MEP for Scotland
- Derek Vaughan, MEP for Wales
- Glenis Willmott, Leader of the European Parliamentary Labour Party since 2009; MEP for the East Midlands

Other Labour politicians

- Leighton Andrews, former Minister for Education and Skills (2009–2013); former Member of the Welsh Assembly for Rhondda
- Tom Copley AM, London Assembly Member (London-Wide)
- Hefin David, Member of the Welsh Assembly for Caerphilly
- Kezia Dugdale, Leader of the Scottish Labour Party since 2015
- Peter Hain, Baron Hain, former Shadow Welsh Secretary (2010–2012) and Welsh Secretary (2002–2008; 2009–2010); former MP for Neath
- Sadiq Khan, Mayor of London since 2016
- Lee Waters, Member of the Welsh Assembly for Llanelli
- Stewart Wood, Baron Wood of Anfield, former co-Shadow Minister without Portfolio (2011–2015)

=== Angela Eagle ===
Angela Eagle's endorsements, prior to her withdrawal from the leadership election on 19 July

MPs

- Rushanara Ali, fellow candidate in the 2015 deputy leadership election (withdrew); MP for Bethnal Green and Bow
- Adrian Bailey, former Chairman of the Business, Innovation and Skills Select Committee (2010–2015); MP for West Bromwich West
- Hilary Benn, former Shadow Foreign Secretary (2015–2016); MP for Leeds Central
- Ben Bradshaw, fellow candidate in the 2015 deputy leadership election; former Shadow Culture Secretary (2010) and former Culture Secretary (2009–2010)
- Kevin Brennan, former Shadow Minister for Business, Innovation and Skills (2015–2016) and former Shadow Minister for Schools (2010–2015); MP for Cardiff West
- Ann Coffey, MP for Stockport
- Mary Creagh, former Shadow International Development Secretary (2014–2015); candidate for Leader in 2015 (withdrew); MP for Wakefield
- Stella Creasy, fellow candidate in the 2015 deputy leadership election; MP for Walthamstow
- Nic Dakin, MP for Scunthorpe
- Thangam Debbonaire, former Shadow Minister for Culture, Media and Sport (2016); MP for Bristol West
- Gloria De Piero, former Shadow Minister for Young People and Voter Registration (2015–2016); MP for Ashfield
- Stephen Doughty, MP for Cardiff South and Penarth
- Jack Dromey, MP for Birmingham Erdington
- Maria Eagle, former Shadow Culture Secretary (2016) and former Shadow Defence Secretary (2015–2016); MP for Garston and Halewood
- Julie Elliott, MP for Sunderland Central
- Chris Evans, MP for Islwyn
- Caroline Flint, fellow candidate in the 2015 deputy leadership election; former Shadow Energy Secretary (2011–2015) (campaign manager)
- Mike Gapes, MP for Ilford South
- Mary Glindon, MP for North Tyneside
- Lilian Greenwood, former Shadow Transport Secretary (2015–2016); MP for Nottingham South
- Nia Griffith, former Shadow Welsh Secretary (2015–2016); MP for Llanelli
- Harriet Harman, former Deputy Leader of the Labour Party (2007–2015); former Acting Leader of the Labour Party and Leader of the Opposition (2010; 2015); MP for Camberwell and Peckham
- Meg Hillier, Chair of the Public Accounts Committee; former Shadow Energy and Climate Change Secretary (2010–2011); MP for Hackney South and Shoreditch
- Margaret Hodge, former Chair of the Public Accounts Committee (2010–2015); MP for Barking
- Sharon Hodgson, MP for Washington and Sunderland West
- George Howarth, MP for Knowsley
- Dan Jarvis, MP for Barnsley Central
- Alan Johnson, former Shadow Chancellor (2010–2011) and former Home Secretary (2009–2010); MP for Kingston upon Hull West and Hessle
- Diana Johnson, former Parliamentary Under-Secretary of State for Schools (2009–2010); MP for Kingston upon Hull North
- Stephen Kinnock, MP for Aberavon
- Peter Kyle, MP for Hove
- Chris Leslie, former Shadow Chancellor (2015); MP for Nottingham East
- Seema Malhotra, former Shadow Chief Secretary to the Treasury (2015–2016); MP for Feltham and Heston
- Siobhain McDonagh, MP for Mitcham and Morden
- Pat McFadden, former Shadow Minister for Europe (2015–2016); MP for Wolverhampton South East
- Jess Phillips, MP for Birmingham Yardley
- Bridget Phillipson, MP for Houghton and Sunderland South
- Rachel Reeves, former Shadow Work and Pensions Secretary (2013–2015); MP for Leeds West
- Emma Reynolds, former Shadow Communities Secretary (2015); MP for Wolverhampton North East
- Joan Ryan, MP for Enfield North
- Gavin Shuker, MP for Luton South
- Gisela Stuart, MP for Birmingham Edgbaston
- Wes Streeting, MP for Ilford North; Member of the Redbridge London Borough Council for Aldborough
- Chuka Umunna, former Shadow Business Secretary (2011–2015); candidate for Leader in 2015 (withdrew); MP for Streatham

MEPs

- Mary Honeyball, MEP for London

Other Labour politicians

- Willie Bain, former Shadow Minister for Scotland (2011–2013); former MP for Glasgow North East
- Lord Hunt of Kings Heath, Shadow Deputy Leader of the House of Lords
- Oona King, Baroness King of Bow, former MP for Bethnal Green and Bow

== Individuals ==
=== Jeremy Corbyn ===
- Akala, rapper and poet
- Attila the Stockbroker, punk poet, musician and songwriter
- Lily Allen, singer, songwriter, actress and television presenter
- Angela Barnes, comedian
- Joey Barton, professional footballer
- Billy Bragg, singer
- Charlotte Church, singer-songwriter, actress and television presenter
- Jack Carroll, comedian and a runner-up on Britain's Got Talent
- Janice Connolly, actress, comedian and artistic director
- Manuel Cortes, General Secretary of the Transport Salaried Staffs' Association (TSSA)
- Miriam David, Professor of Education at the Institute of Education, University of London
- Ivor Dembina, stand-up comedian
- Professor Stephen Deutsch, composer
- Danny DeVito, actor, comedian and director
- Brian Eno, musician and composer
- Jennie Formby, regional secretary and former political director of Unite the Union
- George Galloway, Leader of the Respect Party (2013–2016), broadcaster and former MP for Bradford West (2012–2015)
- Janey Godley, stand-up comedian and writer
- Jeremy Hardy, comedian
- Rufus Hound, comedian, actor and presenter
- Robin Ince, comedian, actor and writer
- Selma James, feminist writer
- Lee Jasper, Senior Policy Advisor on Equalities to the former Mayor of London Ken Livingstone
- Owen Jones, journalist and political commentator
- Shappi Khorsandi, comedian
- Ken Loach, film and television director
- Norman Lovett, stand-up comedian and actor
- Miriam Margolyes, actress
- Francesca Martinez, comedian and writer
- Paul Mason, journalist and writer
- Len McCluskey, general secretary of Unite the Union
- Ewan McGregor, actor
- Patrick Monahan, comedian
- Alan Moore, comic book writer
- Charles Shaar Murray, music journalist and broadcaster
- Dave Nellist, former Labour MP and national chair of TUSC
- Jo Neary, comedian, writer and actress
- Novelist, grime MC and producer
- Tyrone O'Sullivan, former NUM branch secretary and trade union activist
- Sara Pascoe, stand-up comedian and actress
- Maxine Peake, actress
- Grace Petrie, singer-songwriter
- John Rees, founder of Counterfire and Stop The War Coalition
- Michael Rosen, novelist and poet
- Zack Sabre Jr., professional wrestler
- Alexei Sayle, stand-up comedian and actor
- Ian Saville, magician
- Lynne Segal, socialist feminist academic and activist
- Mark Serwotka, General Secretary of the Public and Commercial Services Union
- Arthur Smith, alternative comedian and writer
- Harry Leslie Smith, writer and political commentator
- Mark Steel, stand-up comedian and columnist
- Ava Vidal, comedian
- Holly Walsh, comedian
- Dave Ward, General Secretary of Communication Workers Union
- Matt Wrack, General Secretary of the Fire Brigades Union

=== Owen Smith ===
- Tracy-Ann Oberman, actress
- Frances Barber, actress
- David Blanchflower, labour economist, former member of McDonnell's Economic Advisory Committee (resigned in June 2016)
- Alastair Campbell, journalist, broadcaster, and former Director of Communications and Strategy to Prime Minister Tony Blair
- Charlie Condou, actor and writer (endorsed Andy Burnham in 2015)
- William Dalrymple, historian and writer
- Robert Harris, novelist
- Konnie Huq, television presenter and writer
- Jason Isaacs, actor
- Ross Kemp, actor and investigative journalist
- Paul Kenny, former General Secretary of GMB
- Nick Miles, actor
- Caitlin Moran, English journalist, author, and broadcaster at The Times (endorsed Jeremy Corbyn in 2015)
- Richard Murphy, British chartered accountant and political economist (endorsed Jeremy Corbyn in 2015)
- Jay Rayner, journalist, writer, broadcaster and food critic
- Tony Robinson, actor, comedian and TV presenter
- J. K. Rowling, novelist, author of the Harry Potter fantasy series
- Abby Tomlinson, founder and leader of the Milifandom (endorsed Andy Burnham in 2015)
- Robert Webb, comedian, actor and writer (endorsed Yvette Cooper in 2015)
- Simon Wren-Lewis, economist, former member of the Economic Advisory Committee

== Constituency Labour Parties ==
Candidate	Constituency	CLP nominations	Share
Jeremy Corbyn	Islington North	285	44.12%
Owen Smith	Pontypridd	53	8.20%
Undeclared		308	47.68%

=== Jeremy Corbyn ===
Jeremy Corbyn received the supporting nomination of 285 CLPs.

- Aberconwy
- Aberdeen Donside
- Aldridge-Brownhills
- Almond Valley
- Aldridge-Brownhills
- Arundel and South Downs
- Argyll and Bute
- Ashton-under-Lyne
- Barrow and Furness
- Bath
- Bedford
- Berwick-upon-Tweed
- Beverley and Holderness
- Birmingham Hall Green
- Blackley and Broughton
- Blaydon
- Bognor Regis and Littlehampton
- Bolsover
- Bolton South East
- Bolton South East
- Bolton West
- Bournemouth East
- Bournemouth West
- Bootle
- Boston and Skegness
- Bradford East
- Brent Central
- Brentford and Isleworth
- Bromley and Chislehurst
- Broxtowe
- Bristol East
- Bristol North West
- Bristol South
- Bristol West
- Bury North
- Bury St Edmunds
- Brent North
- Calder Valley
- Camberwell and Peckham
- Canterbury
- Cardiff Central
- Carlisle
- Central Devon
- Ceredigion
- Cheltenham
- Chesterfield
- Chesham and Amersham
- Chippenham
- Chingford and Woodford Green
- Cities of London and Westminster
- Clacton
- Clwyd West
- Clydebank and Milngavie
- Coatbridge and Chryston
- Congleton
- Colchester
- Crewe and Nantwich
- Croydon Central
- Croydon North
- Cunninghame South
- Dagenham and Rainham
- Doncaster Central
- Delyn
- Derbyshire Dales
- Devizes
- Dewsbury
- Dover
- Dulwich and West Norwood
- Dundee East
- Dundee West
- Dwyfor Meirionnydd
- East Devon
- East Surrey
- East Worthing and Shoreham
- Eastleigh
- Easington
- Eddisbury
- Edinburgh Central
- Edinburgh Northern and Leith
- Ellesmere Port and Neston
- Elmet and Rothwell
- Enfield North
- Enfield Southgate
- Epping Forest
- Erewash
- Erith and Thamesmead
- Faversham and Mid Kent
- Folkestone and Hythe
- Fylde
- Gainsborough
- Garston and Halewood
- Gateshead
- Glasgow Anniesland
- Glasgow Kelvin
- Glasgow Maryhill and Springburn
- Glasgow Sheetleston
- Glasgow Southside
- Gloucester
- Grantham and Stamford
- Great Yarmouth
- Gower
- Hackney North and Stoke Newington
- Hackney South and Shoreditch
- Halifax
- Hampstead and Kilburn
- Harborough
- Harlow
- Harrow East
- Harrow West
- Harrogate and Knaresborough
- Hartlepool
- Harwich and North Essex
- Hastings and Rye
- Hamilton, Larkhall and Stonehouse
- Halesowen and Rowley Regis
- Halton
- Havant
- Hayes and Harlington
- Hemsworth
- Hereford and South Herefordshire
- Hexham
- Hitchin and Harpenden
- Holborn and St Pancras
- Horsham
- Hyndburn
- Isle of Wight
- Islington North
- Islington South
- Ilford South
- Jarrow
- Kensington and Chelsea
- Kirkcaldy
- Kingston and Surbiton
- Kingston upon Hull North
- Kingswood
- Knowsley
- Lancaster and Fleetwood
- Leeds East
- Leeds North West
- Leicester South
- Lewes
- Lewisham West and Penge
- Leyton and Wanstead
- Lincoln
- Linlithgow
- Liverpool Riverside
- Liverpool West Derby
- Liverpool Walton
- Loughborough
- Louth and Horncastle
- Luton North
- Luton South
- Maidenhead
- Macclesfield
- Meriden
- Mid Bedfordshire
- Mid Derbyshire
- Mid Fife and Glenrothes
- Mid Sussex
- Mid Worcestershire
- Middlesbrough
- Midlothian North and Musselburgh
- Midlothian South, Tweeddale and Lauderdale
- Milton Keynes North
- Milton Keynes South
- Monmouth
- Montgomeryshire
- Morecambe and Lunesdale
- New Forest East
- Newcastle upon Tyne Central
- Newcastle-under-Lyme
- Newton Abbot
- Newark
- North Cornwall
- North Devon
- North East Cambridgeshire
- North East Derbyshire
- North Norfolk
- North Shropshire
- North Somerset
- North Tyneside
- North West Durham
- North West Hampshire
- North West Leicestershire
- North West Norfolk
- North Wiltshire
- Northampton North
- Northampton South
- Northern Ireland
- Norwich North
- Norwich South
- Nottingham East
- Old Bexley and Sidcup
- Orkney
- Penrith and The Border
- Peterborough
- Plymouth Moor View
- Plymouth Sutton and Devonport
- Poole
- Poplar and Limehouse
- Portsmouth North
- Portsmouth South
- Preseli Pembrokeshire
- Preston
- Pudsey
- Rayleigh and Wickford
- Reading West
- Redcar
- Reigate
- Ribble Valley
- Rochester and Strood
- Rochford and Southend East
- Romford
- Romsey and Southampton North
- Salford and Eccles
- Salisbury
- Scarborough and Whitby
- Scunthorpe
- Sefton Central
- Sevenoaks
- Sheffield Brightside and Hillsborough
- Sheffield Heeley
- Sherwood
- Shetland
- Shipley
- St Helens South and WHiston
- Stalybridge and Hyde
- Stoke-on-Trent Central
- Stoke-on-Trent South
- Solihull
- Somerton and Frome
- South Cambridgeshire
- South East Cambridgeshire
- South East Cornwall
- South Dorset
- South Northamptonshire
- South Ribble
- South Thanet
- South West Bedfordshire
- South West Devon
- South West Norfolk
- South West Wiltshire
- Southampton Itchen
- Southampton Test
- Southend West
- Southport
- Stockport
- Stroud
- Surrey Heath
- Sutton and Cheam
- Sutton Coldfield
- Stretford and Urmston
- Swansea East
- Swansea West
- Tatton
- Tewkesbury
- The Cotswolds
- Thornbury and Yate
- Thurrock
- Tonbridge and Malling
- Torbay
- Torridge and West Devon
- Totnes
- Tottenham
- Truro and Falmouth
- Uxbridge and South Ruislip
- Vale of Clwyd (void)
- Wakefield
- Walthamstow
- Wansbeck
- Warwick and Leamington
- Weaver Vale
- Wellingborough
- West Lancashire
- West Suffolk
- Westmorland and Lonsdale
- Weston super Mare
- Winchester
- Windsor
- Wirral South
- Witney
- Wokingham
- Worthing West
- Wyre Forest
- Ynys Môn

=== Owen Smith ===
Owen Smith received the supporting nomination of 53 CLPs.

- Aberdeenshire West
- Altrincham and Sale West
- Ayr
- Barnsley East
- Basingstoke
- Batley and Spen
- Battersea
- Blaenau Gwent
- Bermondsey and Old Southwark
- Bethnal Green and Bow
- Charnwood
- Chipping Barnet
- Clydesdale
- Darlington
- Dartford
- Derby South
- Dumfriesshire (nominates jointly with Galloway and West Dumfries)
- Ealing Central and Acton
- East Lothian
- Finchley and Golders Green
- Galloway and West Dumfries (nominates jointly with Dumfriesshire)
- Glasgow Cathcart
- Great Grimsby
- Greenock and Inverclyde
- Heywood and Middleton
- Hornsey and Wood Green
- Inverness and Nairn
- Leicester East
- Middlesbrough South and East Cleveland
- Mitcham and Morden
- Moray
- Morley and Outwood
- Na h-Eileanan an Iar
- Newcastle upon Tyne North
- North East Fife
- Nottingham South
- Pontypridd
- Reading East
- Renfrewshire South
- Richmond Park
- Runnymede and Weybridge
- Rutherglen
- South Swindon
- Stevenage
- Strathkelvin and Bearsden
- Streatham
- Twickenham
- Uddingston and Bellshill
- Vauxhall
- Warrington South
- West Ham
- Westminster North
- Wimbledon
- Wrexham

== Affiliated trade unions ==
Candidate	Constituency	TU nominations	Share of TU membership
Jeremy Corbyn	Islington North	8	71.57%
Owen Smith	Pontypridd	4	27.79%
Undeclared		2	0.64%

=== Jeremy Corbyn ===
- UNISON
- Unite the Union (Unite)
- Associated Society of Locomotive Engineers and Firemen (ASLEF)
- Communication Workers Union (CWU)
- Transport Salaried Staffs' Association (TSSA)
- Union of Construction, Allied Trades and Technicians (UCATT)
- Fire Brigades Union (FBU)
- Bakers, Food and Allied Workers' Union (BFAWU)

=== Owen Smith ===
- General, Municipal, Boilermakers and Allied Trade Union (GMB)
- Community
- Musicians' Union (MU)
- Union of Shop, Distributive and Allied Workers (USDAW)

=== Undeclared ===
- Broadcasting, Entertainment, Communications and Theatre Union (BECTU)
- National Union of Mineworkers (NUM)

== Non-affiliated trade unions ==
=== Jeremy Corbyn ===
- Prison Officers Association (POA)
- National Union of Rail, Maritime and Transport Workers (RMT)

== Socialist societies ==
Candidate	Constituency	SS nominations
Owen Smith	Pontypridd	3
Jeremy Corbyn	Islington North	1
Undeclared		19

=== Jeremy Corbyn ===
- Disability Labour

=== Owen Smith ===
- Jewish Labour Movement
- Labour Movement for Europe
- Socialist Health Association (endorsed Jeremy Corbyn in 2015)

=== Undeclared ===
- BAME Labour
- Chinese for Labour
- Christians on the Left
- Fabian Society
- Labour Animal Welfare Society
- Labour Campaign for International Development
- LGBT Labour
- Labour Finance and Industry Group
- Labour Housing Group
- Labour Party Irish Society
- Labour Students
- Labour Women's Network
- National Union of Labour and Socialist Clubs
- Scientists for Labour
- Socialist Educational Association
- Socialist Environment and Resources Association
- Society of Labour Lawyers
- Tamils for Labour

== Affiliated organisations ==
=== Jeremy Corbyn ===
- Young Labour

== Organisations ==
=== Jeremy Corbyn ===
- Alliance for Workers' Liberty (AWL)
- Campaign for Labour Party Democracy (CLPD)
- Disabled People Against Cuts (DPAC)
- Rudimental, English drum and bass band
- Labour Campaign for Nuclear Disarmament (Labour CND)
- Lesbians and Gays Support the Miners (LGSM)
- Labour Party Marxists
- Labour Representation Committee
- National Campaign Against Fees and Cuts
- Stop the War Coalition (StWC)
- UB40, English reggae band

=== Owen Smith ===
- Progress

== Publications ==
Newspaper	General election main endorsement	2015 leadership endorsement	2016 leadership endorsement	Notes
Daily Mirror	Labour Party	Andy Burnham	Did not endorse	—
Sunday People	Labour Party	Andy Burnham	Did not endorse	—
Daily Record	Labour Party	Jeremy Corbyn	Did not endorse	—
Morning Star	Labour Party	Jeremy Corbyn	Jeremy Corbyn	Praised Corbyn's leadership and "courage and principle" in face of his parliamentary critics
The Guardian	Labour Party	Yvette Cooper	Did not endorse	Called for Labour to unite after the result and for "a principled, effective and electable" party
The Sun	Conservative Party	Liz Kendall	Did not endorse	—
