= Working men's club =

Type of private social club first created in 19th-century northern England

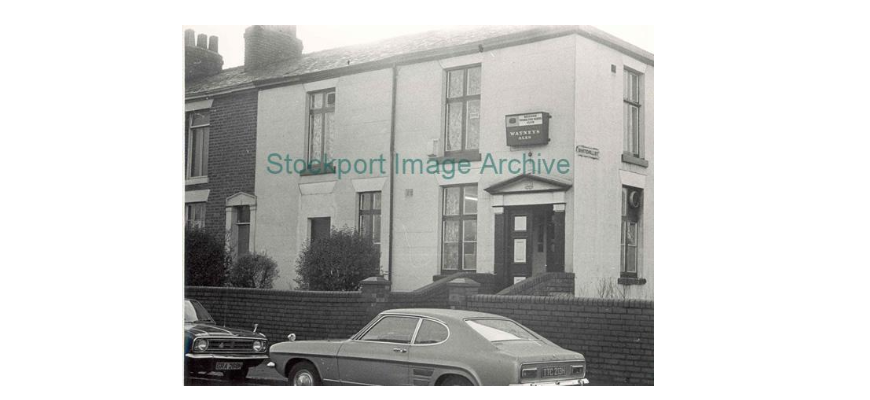
Reddish Working Men's Club - UK's oldest Working Men's Club original building

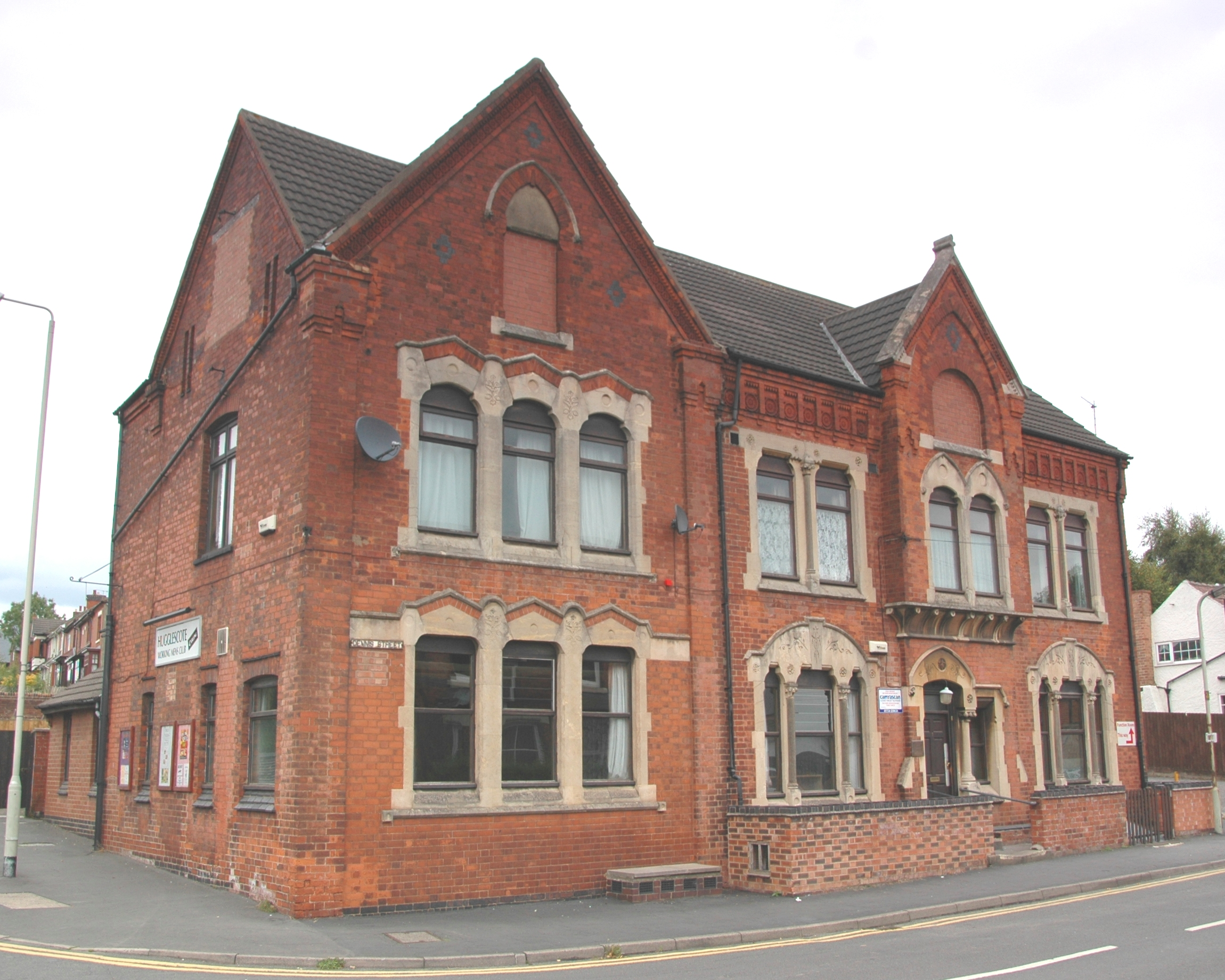
Hugglescote Working Men's Club, North West Leicestershire

Working men's clubs are British private social clubs first created in the 19th century in industrial areas, particularly the North of England, Midlands, Scotland, Northern Ireland and South Wales Valleys, to provide recreation and education for working-class men and their families.

== History ==
The first working men's club opened in 1857 in Reddish, Reddish Working Men's Club is still located on Greg Street, and was established for the workers of Victoria and Albert Mill. Wisbech Working Men's Club & Institute was formed in 1864 in Wisbech, Isle of Ely, and moved to its present site in 1867. It was once the most financially successful of all the clubs in England, with over 1,300 members in 1904.

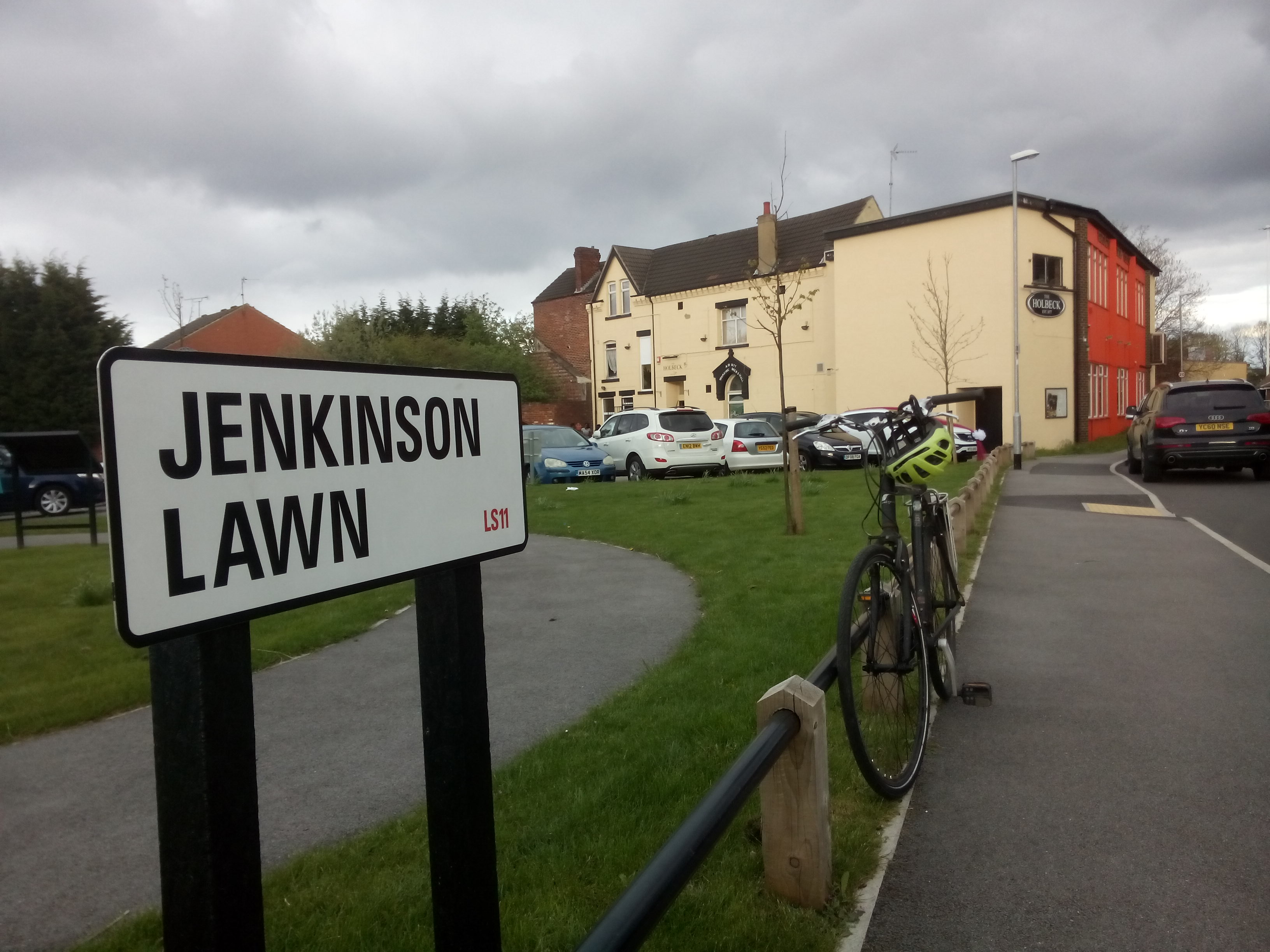
The Holbeck Working Men's Club.

Working men's clubs provided a framework for members to engage in a range of political, educational, or recreational activities.

During the mid-20th century, working men's clubs' popularity grew, as they offered live entertainment and inexpensive drinks. In Leeds, for example, clubs served as theatres hosting entertainment, supplementing the Leeds City Varieties and Grand Theatre, Leeds.

Most working men's clubs are now mainly recreational. Typically, a club would have a room, often referred to (especially in Northern England) as a vault, with a bar for the sale and consumption of alcohol, snooker, pool or bar billiards tables, as well as televisions for sport entertainment; many provide food. A much larger room would be connected, often called the concert or entertainment room, with a stage and a layout of tables, stools and backrest sofas. They often provide night-time entertainment, mainly at the weekends such as bingo, raffles, live music cabaret and comedy, playing popular music. They are also known for their charitable works.

Declining membership has seen many clubs close down and others struggle to remain open.

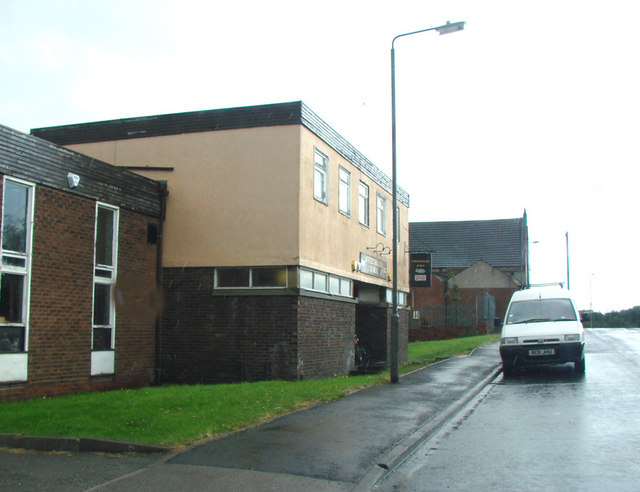
Streethouse working men's club, West Yorkshire

== Membership and structure ==
Working men's clubs are cooperatives run by their members through a committee, usually elected annually. Each club has rules that tend to be vigorously enforced. The committee will discipline members (common punishments being a warning, or a ban for a period) for violations. Despite the name, women are allowed to be members in many clubs, and virtually all clubs allow entry to women. Non-members are not allowed entry unless signed in by a member.

In the UK they are registered as co-operatives under the Co-operative and Community Benefit Societies Act 2014, normally using model rules supplied by the Clubs and Institutes Union.

A dispute at Wakefield City Workingmen's Club in 1978 led to a national campaign for equal membership rights for women. Sheila Capstick, whose husband was an activist in the National Union of Mineworkers, had been a regular snooker player at the club before a ban was instituted on women playing snooker. Her protest, A Woman's Right to Cues, developed into a nationwide campaign for equal rights: ERICCA – Equal Rights in Clubs Campaign for Action. In April 2007, after the resolution had been consistently rejected over years, the Club and Institutes Union accepted equal membership rights for women.

== Club and Institute Union ==
Most clubs affiliate to the Working Men's Club and Institute Union (commonly known as the CIU or C&IU). The CIU is affiliated to the Committee of Registered Clubs Associations. A member of one affiliated club is entitled to use the facilities of other clubs. There were 2,200 affiliated working men's clubs in the UK as of 2010. There are 1,175 as of 2024.

The CIU has two purposes: to provide a national voice for clubs, and to provide discounted products and services for clubs.

=== Brewery ===
Until 2004, clubs ran a brewery at Dunston, Tyne and Wear, which brewed ales and lagers under the Federation brand. The brewery and brands were sold to Scottish & Newcastle for £16.2 million, although CIU clubs still receive discounted beer.

== Impact of 2007 smoking ban ==
A poll by the British Institute of Innkeeping and the Federation of Licensed Victuallers Associations found that overall revenue was 7.3 per cent down as more men opted to drink at home, where they could also smoke.

== See also ==
- Association of Conservative Clubs
- National Union of Labour and Socialist Clubs
- Men's shed
- Hackerspace
- Mechanics' Institutes
- Women's Institutes
- YMCA
- YWCA
