= Association of Conservative Clubs =

United Kingdom political club

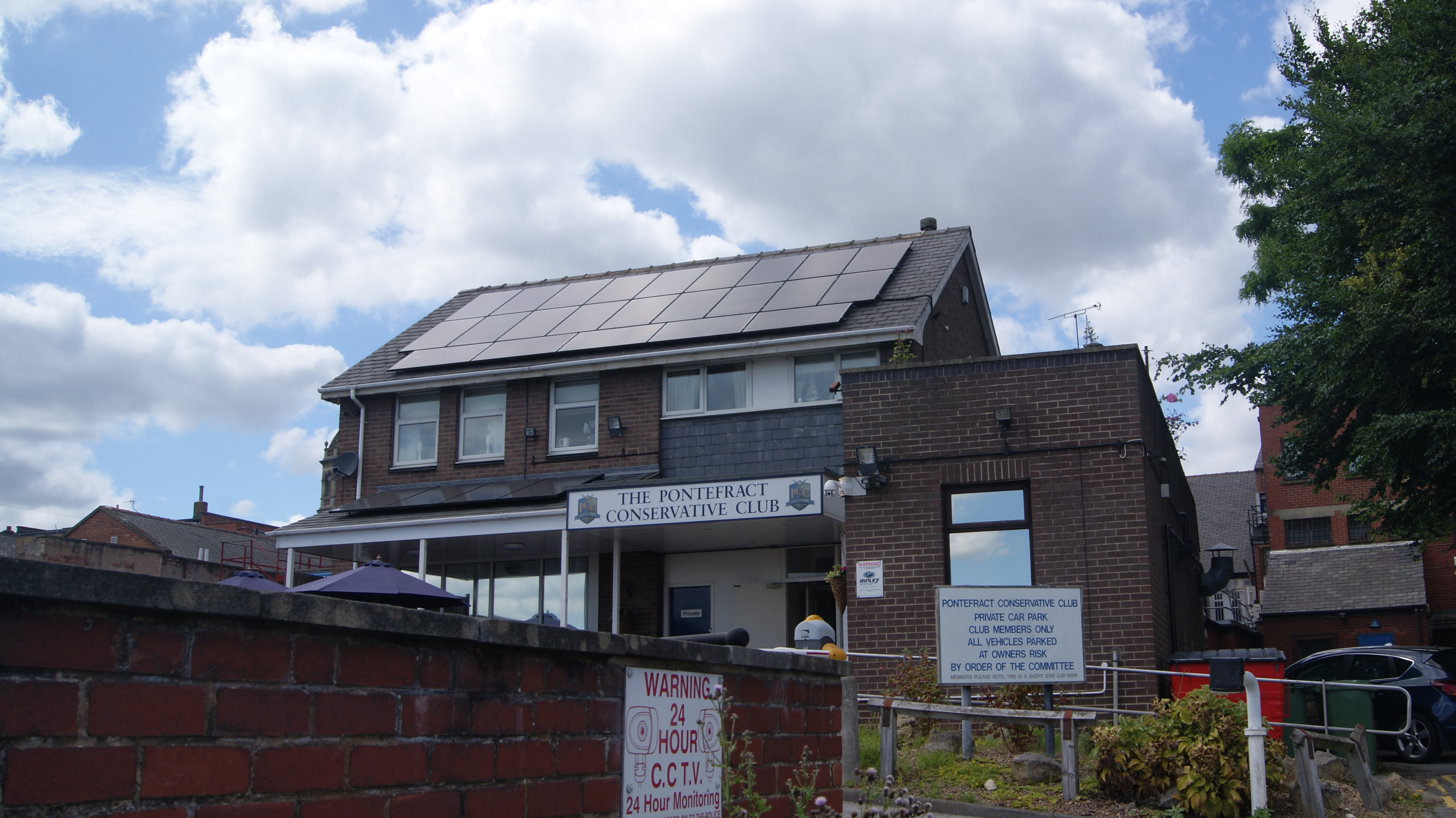
A Conservative club in Pontefract, West Yorkshire

The Association of Conservative Clubs is an organisation associated with the Conservative Party in the United Kingdom. It represents and provides support to the largest association of political clubs in the country estimated at 1,100.

The Association of Conservative Clubs was formed in 1894. Its objects are to assist and encourage the formation of clubs and to support the principles of Conservatism and aims of the Conservative Party. From 1895 to 1941, the association published The Clubman. It was succeeded by Conservative Clubs' Gazette and Conservative Clubs' Magazine. Reflecting the dual origins of the modern Conservative and Unionist Party, some affiliates are called unionist clubs. They may also be known as Beaconsfield clubs (after Benjamin Disraeli), Salisbury clubs or any combination of these titles.

These affiliates can offer a wide range of facilities, including snooker, bar games and entertainment.

== See also ==
- National Union of Labour and Socialist Clubs
- National Union of Liberal Clubs
- Working Men's Club and Institute Union
