= Holbeck Working Men's Club =

Club in Holbeck, Leeds

Coordinates: 53°47′07″N 1°33′18″W

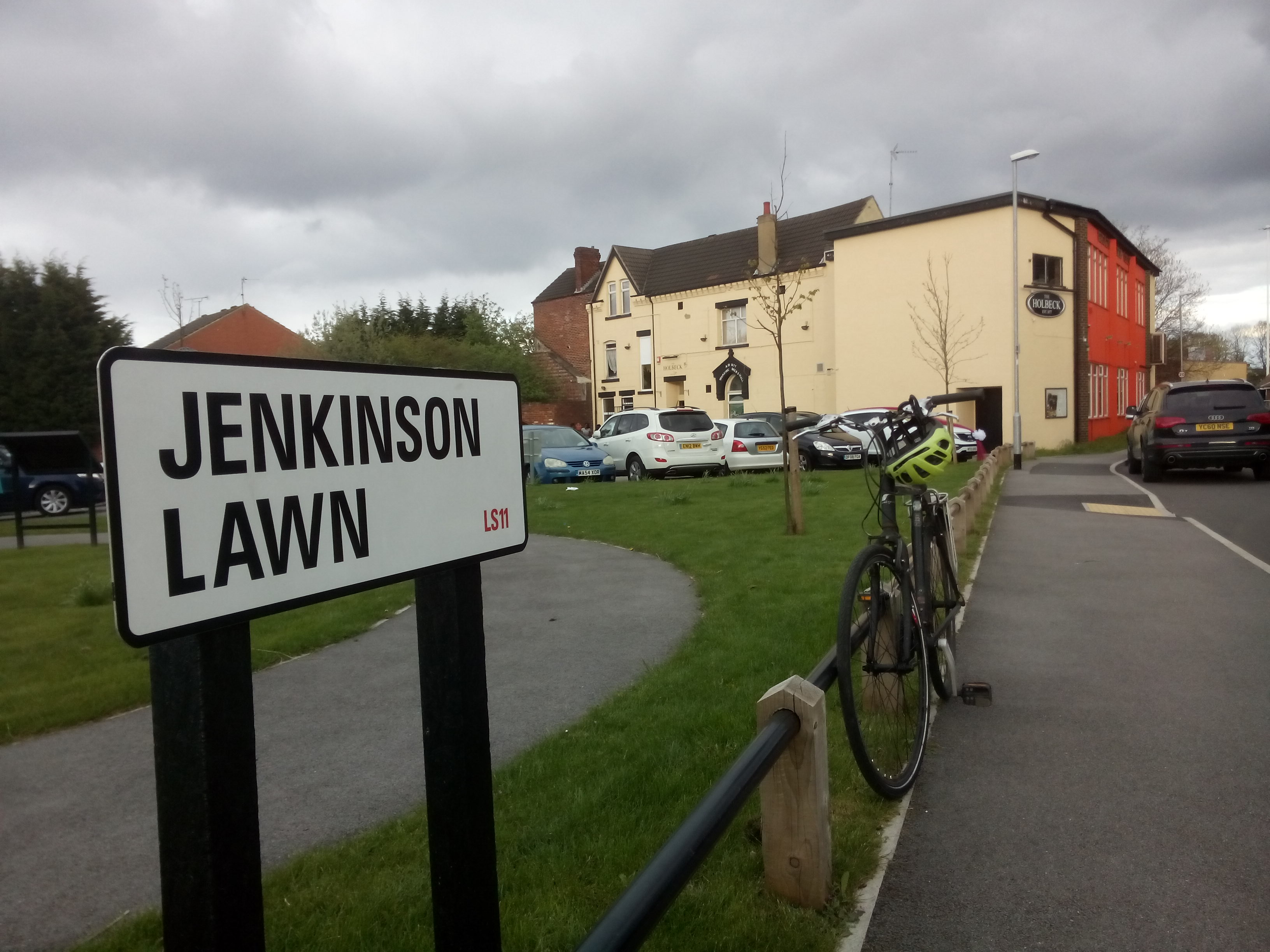
The Holbeck in 2018.

The Holbeck (formerly the Holbeck Working Men's Club or Holbeck WMC) in Leeds is one of the United Kingdom's oldest working men's clubs, and is thought to be the UK's oldest surviving working men's club.

== History ==
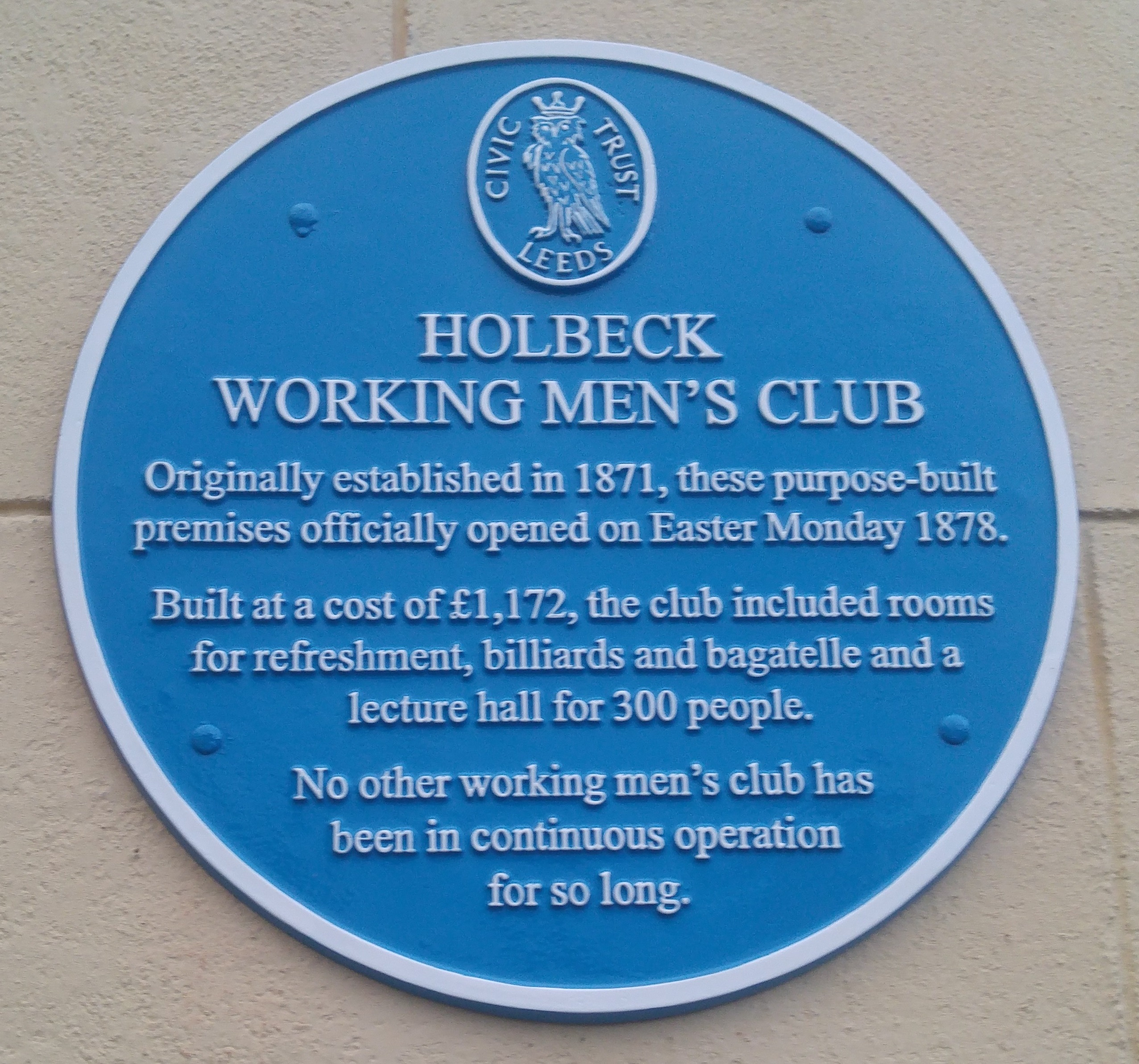
Blue Plaque on Holbeck Working Men's Club

The Club was originally founded in 1871 at '5 Ebenezer-place, Mint, Holbeck' in 1871. By 1876 it boasted 83 members, assets of £81, and receipts of £155. In 1877, the club moved to its present premises, whose address was then 'Low Moorside, Holbeck, Leeds' (now Jenkinson Lawn, Leeds LS11 9QX). By 1907, the club had 501 members, and funds of £1956. In 1913 it recorded 426 members, with funds of £1,758, rising in 1928 to 718 members and funds of £4,918.

Among the people who frequented the Club in the post-war years was the local Labour politician Hugh Gaitskell, and the Club was 'one of the most important venues' for early performances by Ernie Wise alongside his father Harry.

On 2 March 1959, the club voted to permit members' wives to become 'lady members', and elected its first female president, Caroline Turner, in 2021.

The club has long hosted sports teams, including bowls, snooker, and football, winning the West Yorkshire Association Football League in 1989-90. It has also undertaken collections for charity.

On 12 September 2019, a blue plaque was unveiled to celebrate the fact that The Holbeck is the longest continuously running working men's club in the UK.

== Decline and recovery ==
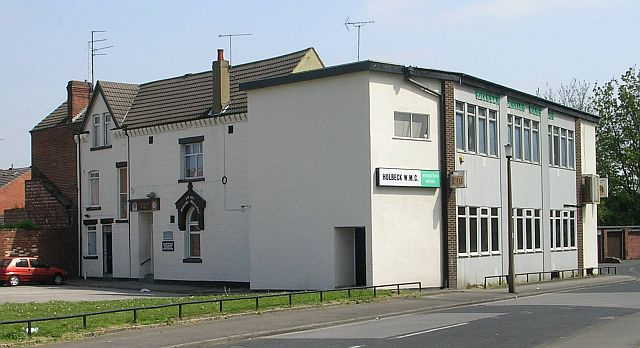
The Holbeck WMC in 2010, prior to renaming and redecoration.

In the early twenty-first century, the Club faced a downturn associated with the Great Recession, compounded by delays in replacing demolished housing around the Club. The Club's membership base was also affected by the rise of bars in Leeds city centre; destabilisation of traditional pub culture by the 2007 smoking ban in England; local demographic shifts to ethnic groups with less of a tradition of drinking in pubs; and a national shift towards drinking supermarket-bought alcohol at home. The same forces led to the closure of at least four nearby pubs, as well as Holbeck's library, sports centre, and many other amenities, and by April 2013, as the Holbeck WMC's debts rose, it was feared that it too would fail.

However, local activists, putting in volunteer labour, succeeded in turning the Club around, partly by appealing to new audiences by providing space for community meetings and other events. By 2018 the volunteer-run club was thriving. Its recovery was cemented in that year when the Holbeck-based theatre company Slung Low moved all their operations from their premises under the arches of a nearby railway viaduct, which were threatened by rising prices, to the Holbeck, clearing the Club's debts. In April 2022, Slung Low announced that they would move their base to a new venue that year, handing management of The Holbeck back to its committee.

== See also ==
- Holbeck Working Men's Club Centenary Brochure (Leeds Central Library, Local Studies, PLH69 (367)).
- Archival photographs at leodis.net
- Alan Lane, The Club on the Edge of Town (Salamander Street, 2022)
