= Working Men's Club and Institute Union =

Voluntary association of private members' clubs in Great Britain & Northern Ireland

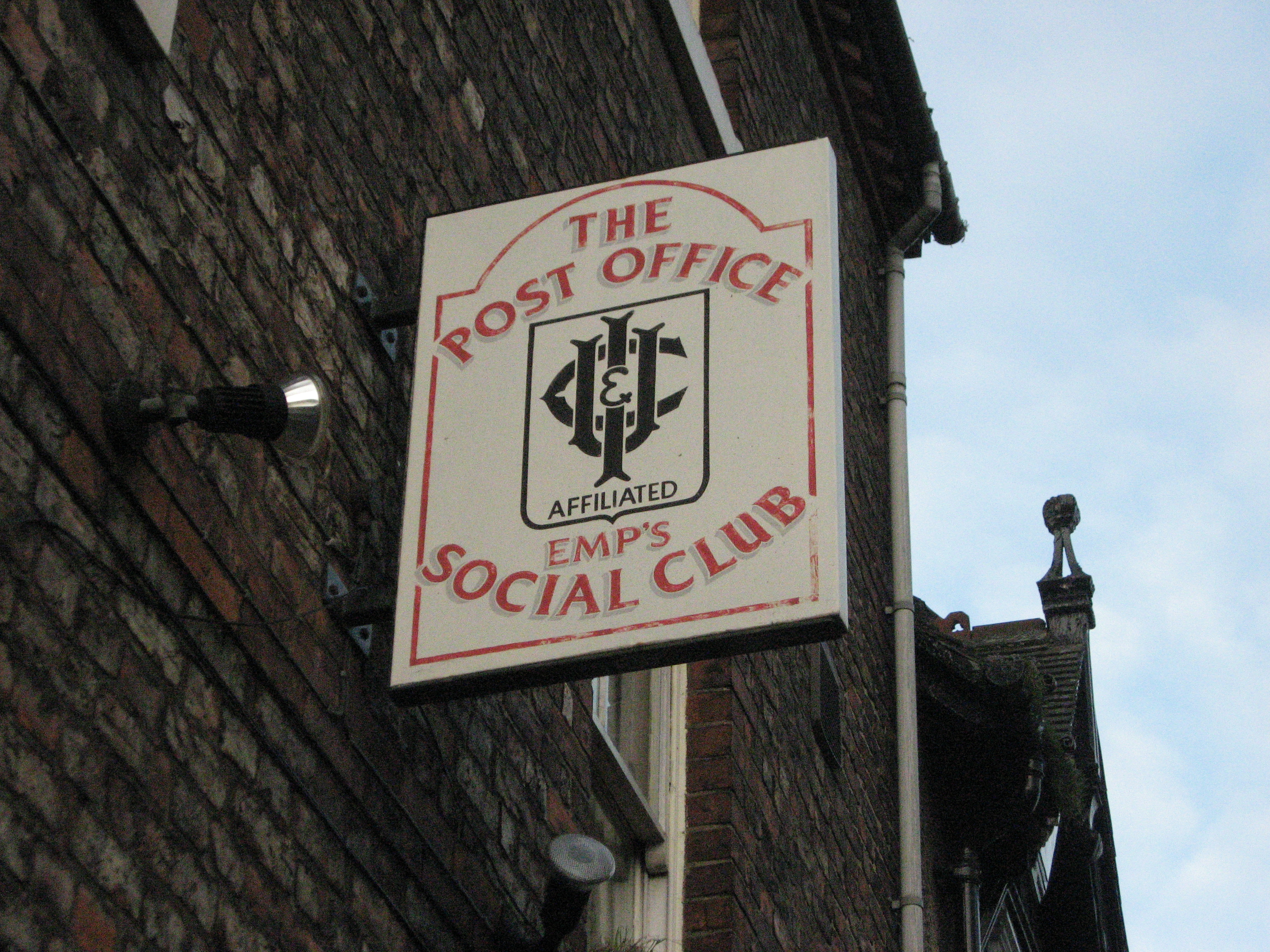
Post Office Employees’ Social Club, York; CIU-affiliated.

The Working Men's Club and Institute Union (CIU or C&IU) is a voluntary association of private members' clubs in Great Britain & Northern Ireland, with about 1,800 associate clubs. One club in the Republic of Ireland, the City of Dublin Working Men's Club is also affiliated. Most social clubs are affiliated to the CIU.

They do not have to be working men's clubs, although most are. There are many village clubs, Royal British Legions, Labour Clubs, Liberal Clubs, and various other clubs involved. A member of one CIU-affiliated club is entitled to use the facilities of all other CIU clubs, although they will only be entitled to vote in committee elections in clubs where they are full members.

The CIU has two main purposes: to provide a voice at national level for working men's clubs and social clubs, and to provide discounted products and services for its members.

== History ==
The Club and Institute Union was founded by The Rev. Henry Solly in 1862. A great propagandist for clubs, he provided a much needed conceptual clarity to the notion of club work. He was also an important advocate for the extension of working class political rights and helped to set up the Charity Organisation Society.

The CIU as a national body is non-political, but individual clubs can be affiliated to political parties. Originally, it was a middle class-led philanthropic organisation aimed at education and non-alcoholic recreation. However, working men themselves soon took over the running of the CIU and drinks were allowed.

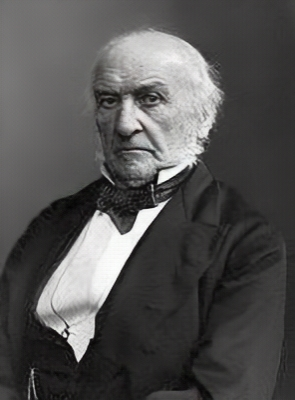
William Ewart Gladstone

In the Victorian era, the Liberal Working Men's Clubs were prominent in increasing the Union's membership. Sometimes Liberal Clubs were called Gladstone Clubs in honour of the Liberal Prime Minister William Ewart Gladstone. In some working-class areas, local landowners and business owners would contribute to the cost: however, as land was relatively cheaper in those days, it was fairly easy for groups of men to buy the land and establish the clubs using their own skills and labour.

In the pre- and post-World War I era, these clubs were often associated with trade societies and trade union branches. In the miners' strike of the early 1980s, the Miners' Welfare Clubs played a key role in their support of the strike. Other such clubs can still be recognised by their name, e.g. Engineers or Railwaymen's Clubs. There were also Socialist Clubs, built before the establishment of the Labour Party. Labour Clubs were founded as that party grew in size in the 1920s. Generally, Conservative Clubs did not join, as they formed their own federation (though there are some such venues still in existence). Servicemen returning from the Great War would also found clubs, and Roman Catholic parishes had clubs. The only stipulation demanded for membership of the CIU was that clubs be owned by the members and accept the standards of membership, as they were often subject to inspection.

The wealthier clubs have sports pitches and dining facilities, as well as indoor games and entertainment. Many entertainers developed their skills in them over the years, as depicted in the ITV series The Wheeltappers and Shunters Social Club.

Until 2004, the CIU had its own beer brewed by the Federation brewery in Dunston, Tyne and Wear. Although CIU-affiliated clubs do still receive discounted beer, these discounts are largely passed on to the members, and Federation beer will generally be cheaper than beer available in local pubs. The brewery was taken over by Scottish & Newcastle in 2004 and now brews Newcastle Brown Ale.

Together with other club organisations such as the Royal British Legion, the Association of Conservative Clubs, the National Union of Liberal Clubs and the National Union of Labour and Socialist Clubs, the CIU is part of CORCA (Confederation of Registered Club Associations) which lobbies Parliament on behalf of clubs. This group was active in the debate about smoking: as most clubs are known for working men who like to drink and smoke (in many cases without any women in the bar), there is some concern about the future prospects of clubs.

The CIU holds a national congress every year and as part of its activities runs convalescent homes. In many ways, it could be said to be the oldest surviving friendly society still run by its members, and continues to play a part in the cultural life of working-class families.

== Today ==
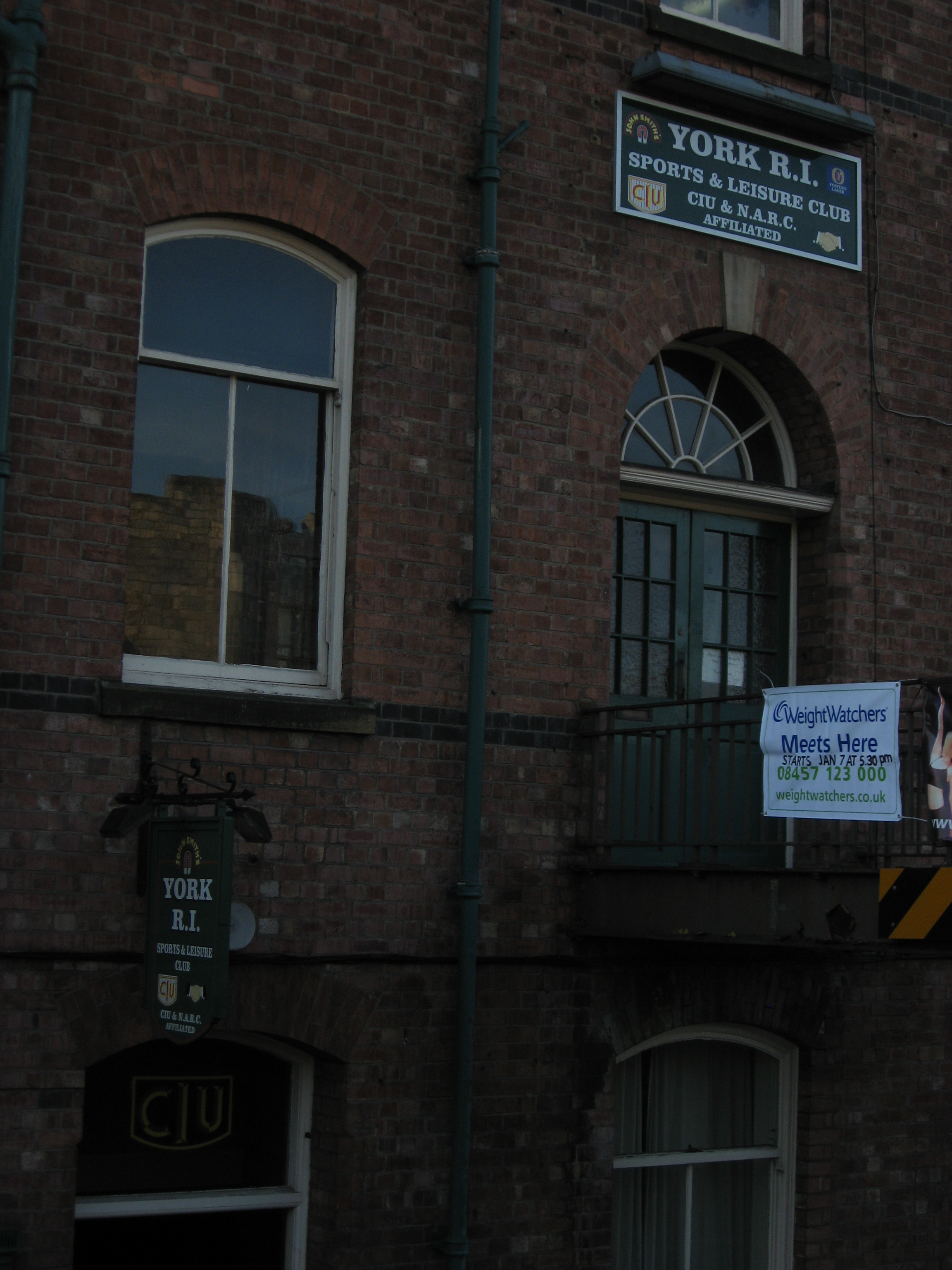
York R I Club, CIU-affiliated.

The Working Men's Club and Institute Union is now the largest non-profit-making social entertainment and leisure organisation in the UK, representing the interests and views of six million club members.

The Working Men's Club and Institute has come a long way since 1862. However, it could be said that working men's clubs have suffered from an old-fashioned image among young people, and have found it hard to compete with modern trends, resulting in many closures of clubs in recent years. The problem has recently become acute, particularly in relation to anti-smoking legislation, which the CIU unsuccessfully lobbied MPs to exempt clubs from. The CIU has changed in recent years, and women are now allowed full membership rights. Some clubs have broadened their appeal by letting local community groups use the facilities.

The Working Men's Club and Institute Unions HQ is in London.

=== The current National Officials of the Union ===
- President – Ken Roberts CMD ACM
- Vice President – Bob Russell CMD
- General Secretary – Kenneth D Green CMD ACM

== C&IU Clubs in Republic of Ireland ==
- City of Dublin Working Men's Club.(Former), Expelled from the union in 2019 for non payment of annual fees.
