= Harry Leslie Smith =

British writer, political commentator, and World War II veteran (1923–2018)

- Born: 25 February 1923; Barnsley, England
- Died: 28 November 2018 (aged 95); Belleville, Ontario, Canada
- Citizenship: British
- Occupations: Author; Social activist Columnist; Oriental rug importer (retired); RAF serviceman (formerly)
- Spouse: Elfriede Gisela "Friede" Edelmann (m. 1947; died 1999)
- Children: 3 sons
- Writing career
- Notable works: The Barley Hole Chronicles; The Empress of Australia; 1923: A Memoir; Harry's Last Stand
- Military career
- Allegiance: United Kingdom
- Branch: Royal Air Force
- Service years: 1941–1948
- Website: harryslaststand.com

Harry Leslie Smith (25 February 1923 – 28 November 2018) was an English writer and political commentator. He grew up in poverty in Yorkshire, served in the Royal Air Force in the Second World War, and emigrated to Canada in 1953. After retiring, Smith wrote his memoirs and about the social history of 20th-century Britain. Smith wrote five books, about life in the Great Depression, the Second World War, and post-war austerity, and columns for The Guardian, New Statesman, The Daily Mirror, International Business Times, and the Morning Star. He appeared in public at the 2014 Labour Party conference in Manchester, and during the 2015 general election and the 2016 EU membership referendum. In Canada he made a 2015 "Stand Up for Progress" national tour.

== Early life ==
Smith was born on 25 February 1923, in Barnsley, Yorkshire, the son of Albert Smith (1867–1943), an unemployed coal miner, and Lillian Dean (1894–1978). His eldest sister Marion died of tuberculosis in 1926, aged ten years; as there was no cure for the disease at the time, nor did the family have enough money to see a doctor. After his father became unemployed, the family moved to Bradford, Yorkshire, then to Halifax, West Yorkshire. Smith joined the RAF in 1941 and spent several years in Hamburg, Germany, as part of the Allied occupation force. Whilst serving there, he met his future wife, Friede. The couple returned to the UK after he was demobilised, and he worked at various jobs around the Yorkshire area.

He and Friede emigrated to Canada in November 1953, living in Scarborough (now part of Toronto) and later in Belleville, Ontario, and had three sons: Michael (born 1953), Peter (1959–2009), and John (born 1963). Smith made a career in the Oriental rug trade, as a buyer and salesman for Eaton's, specialising and importing new designs from the Middle East, the former Soviet bloc, and Afghanistan.

== Writing and speaking activities ==
Smith's wife Friede died in 1999, and his middle son Peter died in 2009. After their deaths, Smith consoled himself by turning to writing. After his retirement he was a writer of memoirs and social history, dividing his time between Ontario and Yorkshire.

Smith wrote regularly for The Guardian, commenting on politics and twentieth-century history. He attracted attention in November 2013, writing that he would not wear the remembrance poppy in future years because he felt the symbol was being used to promote support for present-day conflicts. He addressed the September 2014 Labour Party conference, speaking in support of the National Health Service (NHS) and describing how common preventable diseases "snuffed out life like a cold breath on a warm candle flame" prior to the creation of the NHS. He also spoke on BBC Radio and at the Bristol Politics Festival.

Smith said that it was the 2008 financial crisis that inspired him to take his "last stand", writing and campaigning on income inequality, public services and what he saw as the diminishing prospects for young people. "I want to use my time and whatever influence I have from the book to get the young in Britain to vote the only way we can: to save our social democratic institutions. I want us to make our last stand at the ballot box".

In July 2015, Smith endorsed Jeremy Corbyn's campaign in the Labour Party leadership election.

In October 2015, Smith appeared on the BBC Three documentary We Want Our Country Back, where he sharply criticised the far-right anti-immigration political movement Britain First.

In 2016, Smith also endorsed Corbyn's re-election campaign at the Labour Party leadership election. In March 2016, he said of Corbyn: "He is a very honest-minded man. He has the desire to change things in Britain. Corbyn will change the world for the better. There is no one else". He added: "He'll learn he has to put some more weight behind it. I am behind him and will work with him".

In August 2016 Smith dismissed the accusations of anti-Semitism that had dogged Corbyn, of whom Smith was a vocal supporter. The Equality and Human Rights Commission later determined that there had been serious failings in leadership and an inadequate process of handling anti-Semitism complaints in the Labour Party during Corbyn's leadership.

In September 2017, Smith released his fifth book Don't Let My Past Be Your Future. It was published by Little Brown.

Smith was also active in support of refugees during the European migrant crisis. In November 2017, he appeared on the Sky One comedy The Russell Howard Hour, where he briefly recalled his trip to the Calais Jungle, discussed his new book and the increasing dependence on food banks in the UK. Smith and Howard also discussed the NHS, with Smith reflecting on the accessibility of medical care with a family story.

Smith wrote of the political situation in 2017:

I am one of the last few remaining voices left from a generation of men and women who built a better society for our children and grandchildren out of the horrors of the second world war, as well as the hunger of the Great Depression. Sadly, that world my generation helped build on a foundation of decency and fair play is being swept away by neoliberalism and the greed of the 1%, which has brought discord around the globe. Today, the western world stands at its most dangerous juncture since the 1930s.

== Illness and death ==
On 20 November 2018, Smith was admitted to Belleville General Hospital in critical condition after contracting pneumonia. His hospital stay prompted an international cyber-vigil on Twitter and an outpouring of support from well-wishers from around the world; including Leader of the Labour Party, Jeremy Corbyn, of whom Smith was a major supporter. He died on the morning of 28 November 2018, aged 95.

== Books ==
Self-published autobiographical works;

- Love among the ruins (2009) (was Hamburg 1947: A Place for the Heart to Kip),
- 1923: A Memoir (2010)—

These two works were also published together as The Barley Hole Chronicles

- The Empress of Australia: A Post-War Memoir (2013),

Published by Icon Books and Constable:

- Harry's Last Stand (2014) Reviewers described this last book as "heart-breaking" and "a furious poem dedicated to the preservation of the welfare state", and wrote that "the book... meanders between biography and rage against the system. The biography parts are the most compelling...." Another commentator calls Smith "a fine writer and a logical thinker, even though Harry's Last Stand makes its points early and often and is a bit of a rant at times." It has sold over 18,000 copies.
- Don't Let My Past Be Your Future (2017) )
