= National Union of Labour and Socialist Clubs =

Working men's club in the United Kingdom

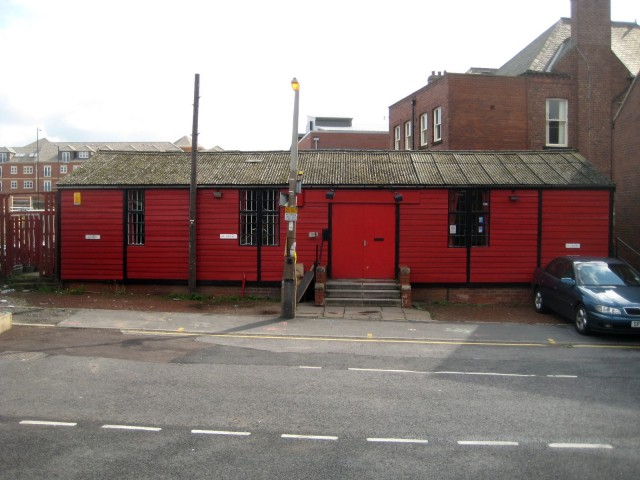
A Labour club in Wakefield, West Yorkshire

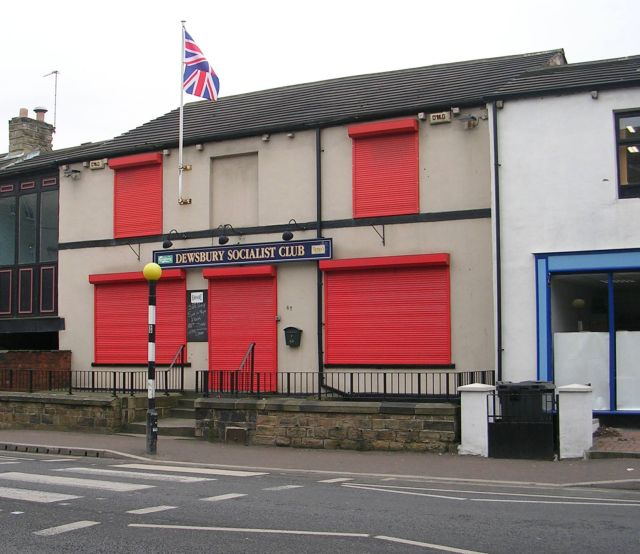
A Socialist club in Dewsbury, West Yorkshire

The National Union of Labour and Socialist Clubs (NULSC) is a socialist society representing Working men's clubs affiliated to the Labour Party of the United Kingdom, with many also affiliated to the Working Men's Club and Institute Union. The society was founded in 1918. As of 2020, there were 28 working men's clubs associated with the society.
