= 2021 Labour Party leadership election =

Labour Party leadership elections were held in the following countries during 2021:

- 2021 Israeli Labor Party leadership election
- 2021 Scottish Labour leadership election
- 2021 Tasmanian Labor Party leadership election in Australia
- 2021 New South Wales Labor Party leadership election in Australia
- 2021 Saint Kitts and Nevis Labour Party leadership election

== See also ==
- 2020 Labour Party leadership election
- 2022 Labour Party leadership election
