= 2022 Labour Party leadership election =

Labour Party leadership elections were held in the following countries during 2022:

- 2022 Labour Party leadership election (Ireland)
- 2022 Israeli Labor Party leadership election
- 2022 Northern Territory Labor Party leadership election in Australia

== See also ==
- 2021 Labour Party leadership election
- 2023 Labour Party leadership election
