= Israeli Labor Party primaries =

Since the 1992 Israeli legislative election, the Israeli Labor Party has selected its party lists through primary elections in which party members are eligible to participate. This has been the case in all elections since 1992, with the exceptions of the September 2019 and 2020 legislative elections, in which the party based its party list off of the results of the primary previously held in advance of the April 2019 legislative election.

Labor's practice of using primaries to determine their party list is unusual among parties in Israel. In Israel, most parties instead decide their party lists either through a nomination committee or by prerogative of the party leaders.

== Background ==
Before moving to primaries in 1992, the party had previously chosen its party list through a closed process involving party leaders for every election, with the exception of the 1988 Knesset election, for which the party instead used an open process in which 1,267 members of the party's Central Committee selected the list in convention.

== 1992 ==
108,347 party members voted in the 1992 primary, marking 70.10% turnout.

== 1996 ==
194,788 party members voted in the 1996 primary, marking 74.60% turnout.

== 1999 ==
101,087 party members voted in the 1999 primary, marking 62.00% turnout.

== 2002 ==
58,783 party members voted in the 2002 primary, marking 53.00% turnout.

== 2006 ==
68,331 party members voted in the 2006 primary, marking 58.40% turnout.

== 2008 ==
31,789 party members voted in the 2008 primary, marking 53.90% turnout.

== 2012 ==
35,035 party members voted in the 2012 primary, marking 58.00% turnout.

The order that the top candidates finished in were as follows:

1. Shelly Yachimovich
2. Isaac Herzog
3. Amir Peretz
4. Eitan Cabel
5. Merav Michaeli
6. Binyamin Ben-Eliezer
7. Hilik Bar
8. Omer Bar-Lev
9. Stav Shaffir
10. Avishay Braverman
11. Erel Margalit
12. Itzik Shmuli
13. Mickey Rosenthal
14. Michal Biran
15. Nachman Shai
16. Moshe Mizrahi
17. Danny Atar
18. Raleb Majadele
19. Nadia Hilou
20. Nino Abesadze
21. Yona Yahav
22. Daniel Ben-Simon
23. Ofer Kornfeld
24. Hili Tropper
25. Yona Prital

== 2015 ==
The party held its primary on 13 January 2015. 28,742 party members voted in the primary, marking 58.80% turnout.

== 2019 ==
On 11 February 2011, the Labor Party held its primary in advance of the April 2019 legislative election. 33,672 party members voted in the primary (held in advance of the April 2019 legislative election), marking 56.30% turnout.

The party would subsequently use the results of this primary to also choose its party lists for the September 2019 and the 2020 legislative elections, instead of holding new primaries for these elections. Neither of the Knessets elected by the April 2019 nor September 2019 had succeeded in forming a government.

== 2021 ==
The 2021 primary took place on 1 February less than two weeks after the party's 24 January leadership election. 18,106 party members voted in the primary, marking a turnout of roughly 40%.

The primary had originally been cancelled after the party voted at its November 2020 convention 66% to 33% to have the 3,800 activists eligible to vote at the party's convention select the nominees instead of the party's general membership, a move orchestrated by then-Labor Party chairman Amir Peretz. However, on 3 January 2021, the Tel Aviv District Court ruled that the move to cancel primary was illegal.

In the primary, voters were able to vote for between five and seven individuals from a list of 62 candidates.

== 2022 ==
The primary for the electoral list to be used in the 2022 Israeli legislative election was held on August 9, 2022. Roughly 57% of the 40,000 eligible voters participated. Most votes were cast digitally, but four physical voting locations were established. The physical voting locations were in Beersheba, Haifa, Jerusalem, and Tel Aviv.
