= Naama Lazimi =

Israeli politician (born 1986)

- נעמה לזימי
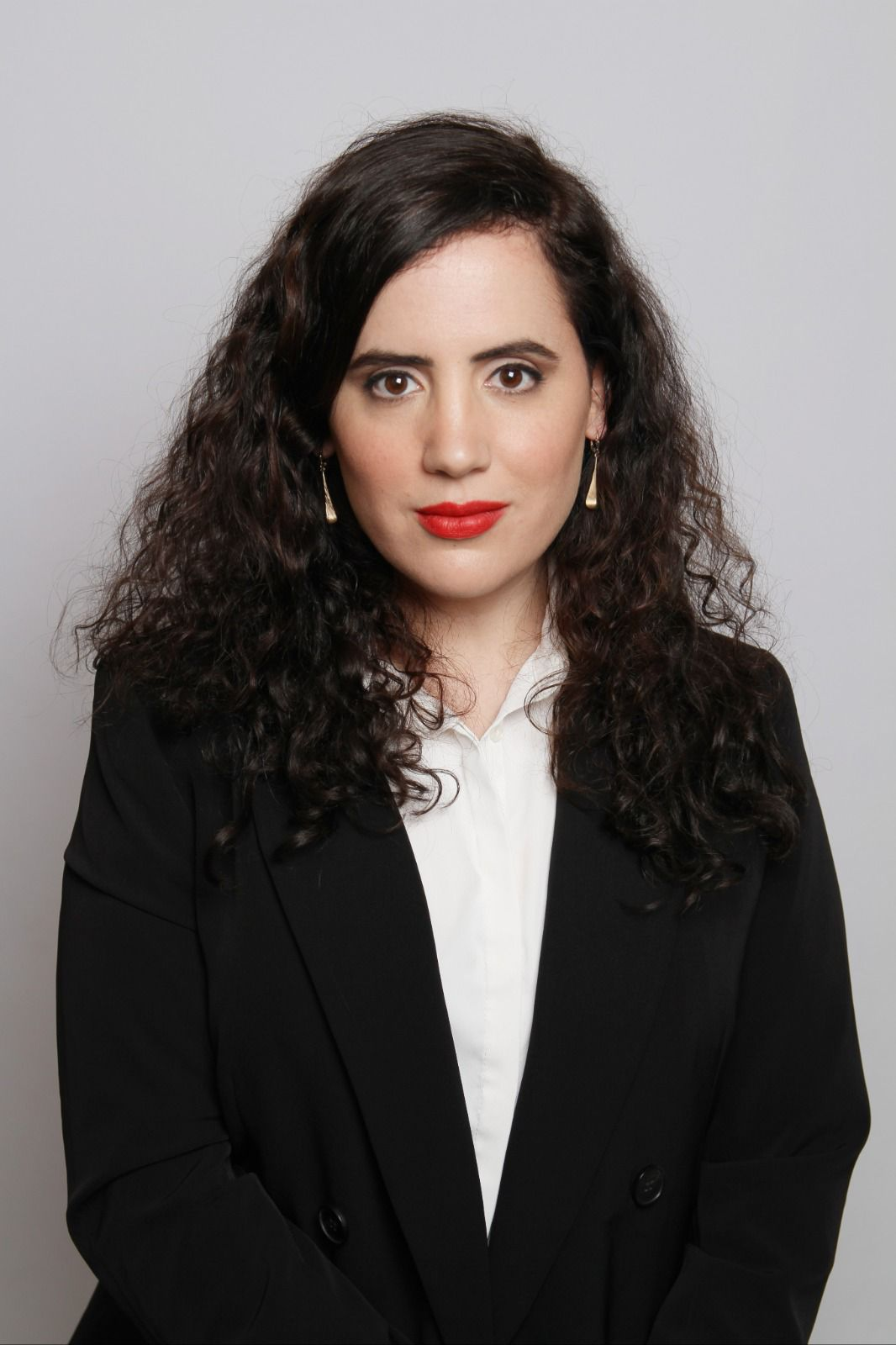
- Lazimi in 2022

Faction represented in the Knesset
- 2021–2024: Labor Party
- 2024–: The Democrats

Personal details
- Born: 11 January 1986 (age 40) Migdal HaEmek, Israel

Naama Lazimi (Hebrew: נעמה לזימי; born 11 January 1986) is an Israeli politician currently serving as a Member of the Knesset for the Democrats and previously for the Labor Party. She additionally served as a member of the Haifa City Council and vice chairman of the Student Association at the University of Haifa.

== Biography ==
Naama Lazimi was born and raised in Migdal HaEmek to Moroccan Jewish parents. Her father, Avi, was a school principal and deputy mayor of Migdal HaEmek. She studied at the local school 'Rogozin', served in the IDF as an officer in the Ministry of Defense and later as a reserve officer in the Home Front Command. She studied political science and Jewish history at the University of Haifa. As a student she was vice-chair of the University Student Association.

=== Political career ===
Lazimi worked as a parliamentary adviser to Knesset member Shelly Yachimovich. She founded the Center for Political Training and Resolution of the "Vision" conflict within the Peace Now organization, and chaired the finance committee of the Koah LaOvdim organization. In 2012 she was elected to the Labor Party conference. In 2016, as chairman of the Young Shift of the Labor Party in Haifa, she ran for the presidency of the National Young Shift but lost by a narrow margin.

In the 2010s, she moved to the Hadar HaCarmel neighborhood of Haifa. In the run-up to the local elections in Israel held in November 2018, an agreement was signed between Einat Kalisch-Rotem and the head of the Labor Party, Avi Gabbay, according to which Lazimi was placed third on Kalisch-Rotem's list. In the election, the list won four seats and the mayoralty, and Lazimi was elected a member of the city council. As part of this role, she chaired the Haifa Gender Equality Committee and the board of directors of the Haifa Museums Company, and was a member of the Audit, Welfare and Construction Committees, and the Shikmona Board of Public Housing. She conducted a collaboration between the Technion and the ORT Braude College of Engineering on behalf of ISEF - Israel Scholarship Education Foundation. In addition, she worked as a consultant for the northern field at the Jewish National Fund.

In February 2021, ahead of the twenty-fourth Knesset elections, Lazimi was elected in the primaries to the 9th place on the Labor Party list, which received seven seats.

In The Democrats primary elections held on 20 July 2026, ahead of the 2026 Israeli legislative election, Lazimi came in at number two on the slate.

=== Knesset member ===
Following the resignation of Omer Bar-Lev from the Knesset under the Norwegian Law, she entered the Knesset for the first time.

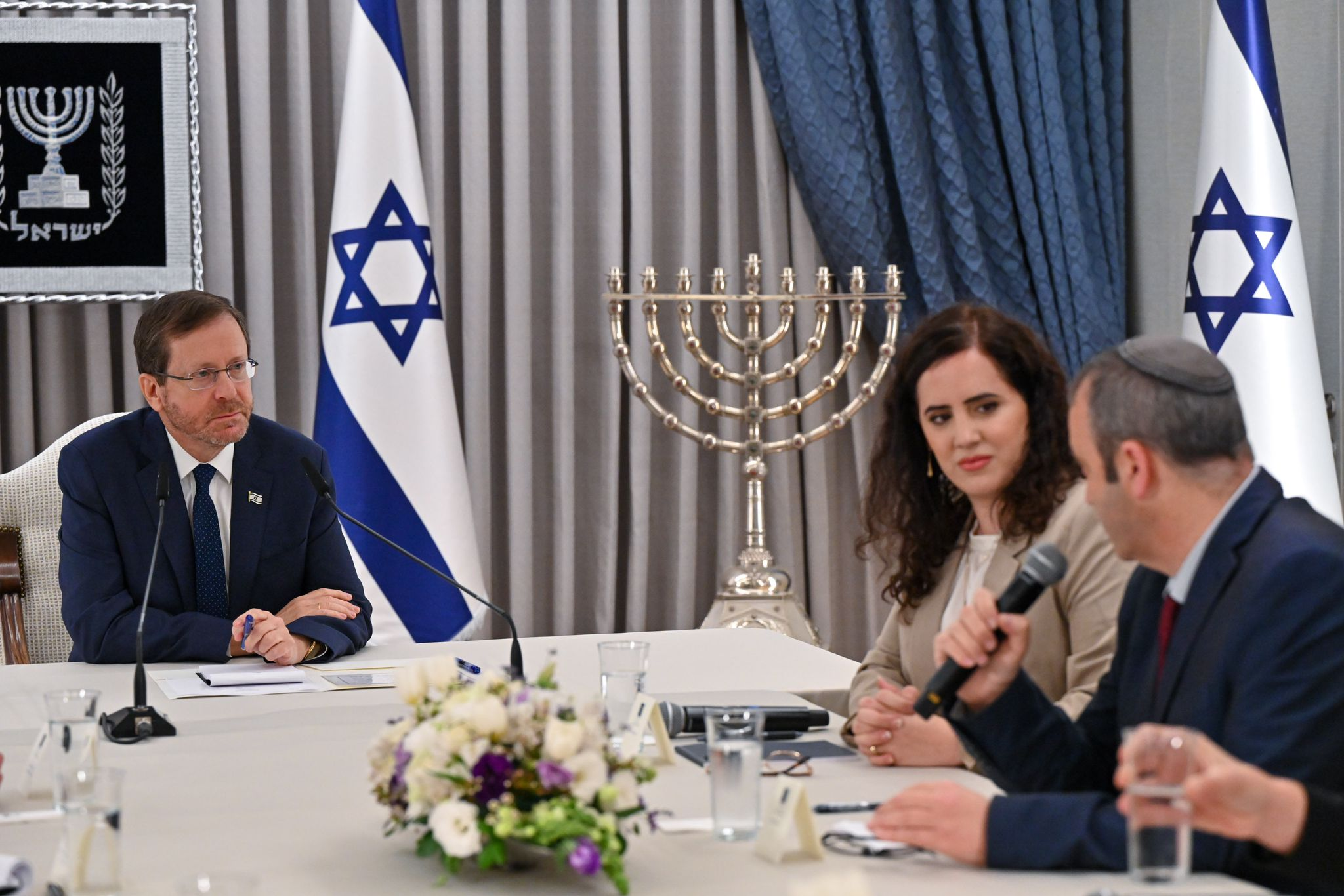
Lazimi with Israeli president Isaac Herzog in November 2022

In August 2022, ahead of the twenty-fifth Knesset elections, Lazimi was elected in the primaries to the 2nd place on the Labor Party list, second only to party leader Merav Michaeli. The Labor Party only retained four seats in the election.

Lazimi led an effort in October 2021, which included eight other MKs from both the government and the opposition, to sponsor a bill which would raise the minimum wage by 35% to 40 NIS (equivalent to $12.50 USD). In December 2022, Lazimi presented a bill to peg Knesset members' wages to the minimum wage.

In March 2023, Lazimi, along with Michaeli, Gideon Sa'ar, and Meirav Ben-Ari, proposed a bill that would allow courts to use electronic tracking on convicted domestic abusers. The bill was defeated with 59 votes for and 60 votes against, primarily due to opposition from the national security minister Itamar Ben-Gvir.

The Labor Party held a leadership election in 2024. Lazimi endorsed the former IDF deputy chief of staff Yair Golan, who ran on a platform of merging Labor with the left-wing party Meretz. Lazimi stated, "The responsibility for change and hope is on us. We have an opportunity for a diplomatic-security, economic, and social horizon for life itself." Golan described Lazimi and her fellow Labor MK Gilad Kariv as "excellent parliamentarians". Following Golan's victory, the two parties merged into a new left-wing alliance called the Democrats in June of that year.

Yair Netanyahu, the son of Prime Minister Benjamin Netanyahu, has lived abroad with bodyguards since 2023, which was estimated to cost the government NIS 2.5 million (equivalent to $680,000 USD) in 2024. In February 2025, during a Knesset Finance Committee meeting, Lazimi criticized this, and asserted that Netanyahu was "exiled" for allegedly hitting his father, stating:

I want to ask about the prime minister’s son, Yair Netanyahu. Last year, an article stated that his security costs around NIS 2.5 million per year. I want to ask whether this sum is still budgeted and whether there is still an intention to fund the prime minister’s son’s stay because he hit the prime minister and had to be abroad as he damaged a symbol of authority.

A representative for Netanyahu's party, Likud, called the allegations an "absolute lie and detestable, a new low from the depths of the Left’s sewer." The representative also said that Lazimi should lose her immunity and pay, as should anyone else who repeated her claims. Yair Netanyahu also filed a lawsuit against Lazimi.

During the Twelve-Day War between Iran and Israel, the Arab city of Tamra was hit by a missile from Iran, killing four and injuring ten. Lazimi, Golan, and Kariv visited the city on 15 June 2025 to pay condolences to the families of those killed. Fellow opposition party National Unity followed suit the next day, prompting criticism of the government for failing to visit Tamra despite visiting other cities hit by Iranian missiles.

She serves as the chair of the Knesset's special committee on Young Israelis.

=== Protests ===
Lazimi has been heavily active in anti-government protests during the Gaza war. After Tel Aviv resident Noa Goldenberg was arrested in September 2024 for allegedly throwing sand on National Security Minister Itamar Ben-Gvir, Lazimi and Yesh Atid MK Vladimir Beliak were involved in a protest outside of the prison where she was being held, calling for her release. In July 2024, Ben-Gvir called Lazimi a "criminal" due to her participation in protests.

Also in September 2024, police in Tel Aviv barred a protest that would block an intersection, stating that the expected turnout would be too low to justify blocking the intersection. Lazimi criticized the police, arguing that they were suppressing protests on Ben-Gvir's orders.

During a protest on 31 March 2025, Lazimi was attacked by police. Afterwards, she accused the police of suppressing democracy and working "for the coup government, a Kahanist criminal and a prime minister suspected of serious security incidents". The following day, opposition leader Yair Lapid sent a letter to Knesset speaker Amir Ohana, requesting that police protect lawmakers and demonstrators, and criticizing police brutality against Lazimi, other MKs, and citizens, whom he referred to as "Israeli patriots". However, in May, a leaked conversation included Lapid criticizing Golan and the Democrats as being "radical leftists". While he praised protests and criticized the government, he said that, "we don’t think that jumping on water cannons like Na’ama Lazimi is what will save the State of Israel." Golan defended his party and its approach on Twitter.

== Political positions ==
Lazimi has been described as a liberal; she has described herself as a feminist, social democrat, and "left-wing Zionist." She has criticized racism against Mizrahi Jews in Israel, and praised the right-wing Moroccan-born politician David Levy, who played a pivotal role in bringing Mizrahi Jews into Israeli political life. She is also involved in LGBT rights activism.

She supports the existence of Israel as a Jewish and democratic state, and a two-state solution to resolve the Israel-Palestine conflict. She is critical of anti-Zionism in the global left.

Lazimi has criticized the far-right politician Itamar Ben-Gvir, saying in 2021 that he belongs in prison and his presence in the Knesset is a "disgrace for all of Israel", and called for sanctions against him and warned against his reelection. His party, Otzma Yehudit, left the government following the 2025 Gaza war ceasefire, and rejoined when the ceasefire broke down in March 2025. Lazimi stated that his reappointment as minister of national security was "madness", and opined, "It’s a strange world. A faction resigns from the government because lives are being saved, and the same party returns to the government when they are being abandoned".

In June 2025, United States President Donald Trump made posts calling for an end to Netanyahu's corruption trial, referring to it as a "Witch Hunt" and a "travesty of 'justice'", and accusing it of interfering in negotiations with Iran and Hamas. In response, Lazimi criticized Netanyahu, stating that by, "trading his indictment in exchange for a political settlement and an end to the war", he demonstrated his unfitness for office and is "conditioning the future of Israel and our children on his trial".

== Personal life ==
In 2023 Lazimi moved from Haifa to Holon. She is married and a mother of two. Her relative, Dor Lazimi, was killed at the Nahal Oz Outpost during the 7 October attacks.
