= 2024 Welsh Labour leadership election =

2024 Welsh Labour leadership election may refer to:

- February–March 2024 Welsh Labour leadership election
- July 2024 Welsh Labour leadership election

== See also ==
- 2024 Labour Party leadership election (disambiguation)
