= 2024 Labour Party leadership election =

Leadership elections took place in Labour Parties in the following countries during 2024:

- 2024 Israeli Labor Party leadership election in Israel
- 2024 Tasmanian Labor Party leadership election in Australia
- 2024 Queensland Labor Party leadership election in Australia
- February–March 2024 Welsh Labour leadership election in Wales
- July 2024 Welsh Labour leadership election in Wales
- 2024 Social Democratic and Labour Party leadership election in Northern Ireland

== See also ==
- 2023 Labour Party leadership election
- 2025 Tasmanian Labor Party leadership election
- 2025 Labour Party deputy leadership election
- 2026 Labour Party leadership election
- 2026 Welsh Labour leadership election
