= 2024 Israeli Labor Party leadership election =

Israeli Labor Party leadership election

- 28 May 2024

vote by general membership of party
- Registered: 52,044
- Turnout: 60.24%
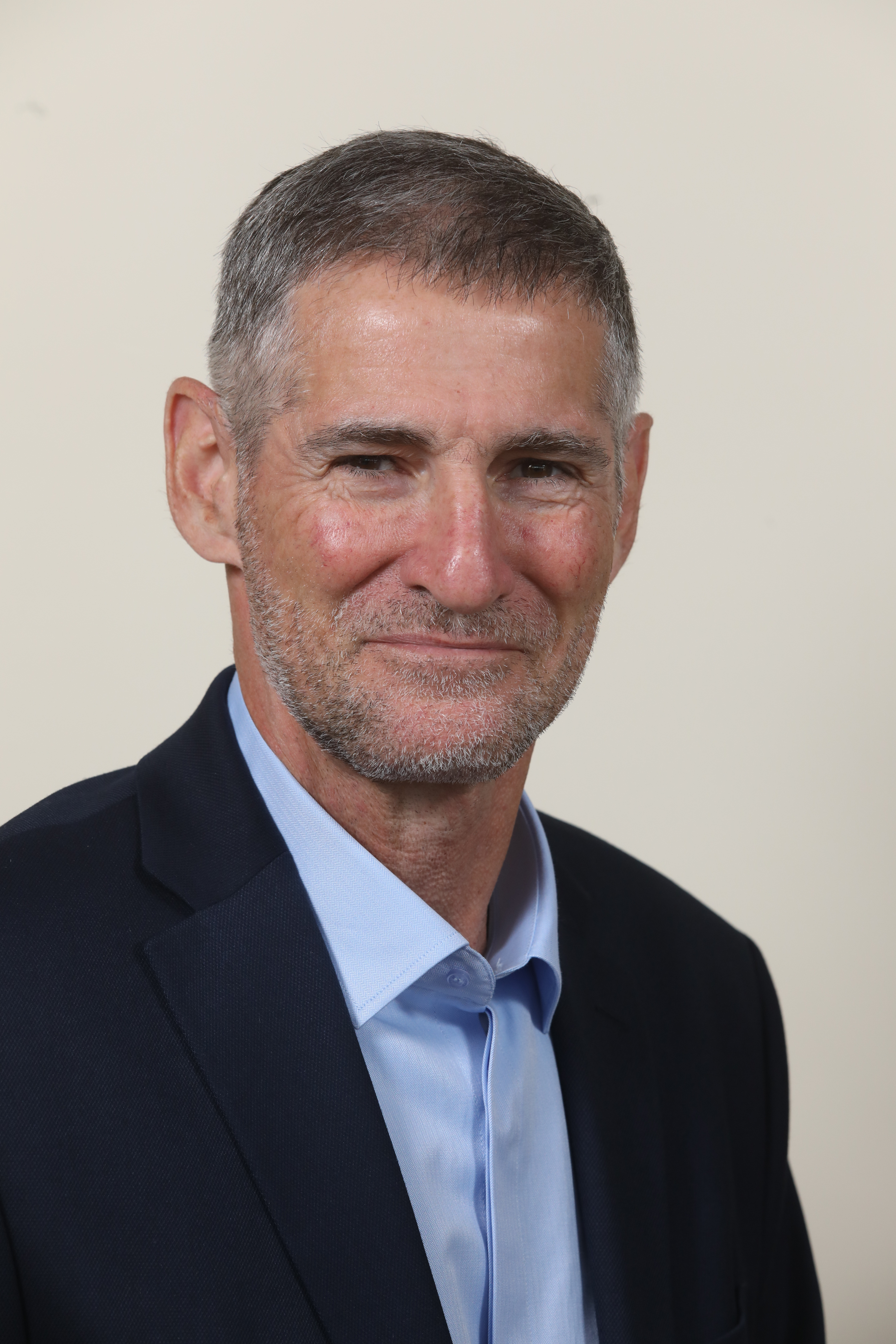

Candidate	Yair Golan	Avi Shaked
Popular vote	29,832	592
Percentage	95.15%	1.89%
Leader before election
Merav Michaeli
Elected Leader
Yair Golan

The 2024 Israeli Labor Party leadership election was held on 28 May 2024 to elect a successor to Merav Michaeli as leader of the Israeli Labor Party. Yair Golan won the election.

== Background ==
Michaeli was first elected leader of the Israeli Labor Party in the party's 2021 leadership election. Prior to her election as the party's leader, opinion polling for the 2021 Knesset election had the party falling below the electoral threshold; however, the party's support in polling recovered after her election as its leader, and the party won seven seats in the 2021 Knesset election. Michaeli was re-elected as party leader in 2022, becoming the first Israeli Labor Party leader to win two consecutive leadership elections since 1984, and the only one to do it after the party first opened participation in leadership elections to all party members in 1992.

Labor won four seats in the 2022 Knesset election (the minimum number of Knesset seats that an individual electoral bloc could receive if they exceeded the electoral threshold). Michaeli faced heavy criticism for her decision not to partner Labor in the election with the left-wing Meretz party, especially after the election's results came in. Meretz won no seats due to falling narrowly below the electoral threshold, which helped Likud and hard-right ally parties win enough seats to form a right-wing governing majority. The Labor Party soon fell below the electoral threshold in opinion polling for the 2026 Israeli legislative election.

On 7 December 2023, Michaeli announced her intentions to relinquish her position as party leader and retire from politics after the end of the 25th Knesset. As a result, the party prepared to hold a leadership election in April 2024. The same day that Michaeli announced her plan to step down, Meretz chairman Tomer Reznik proposed that Labor hold its primaries jointly with Meretz. On 25 February 2024, the party set 28 May as the date of the leadership election. In early May, the party announced that its registered membership had grown with 13,500 new members joining in advance of the leadership vote.

== Process ==
The party would have needed to hold an election for its party conference within a month of the leadership election, according to a ruling made on 21 May 2024 by the Tel Aviv District Court. The ruling was appealed by Nir Rosen. A day before the election, the District Court decision was reversed by the Supreme Court of Israel, who ruled that the results of the election will be final.

== Candidates ==
- Yair Golan, former Member of the Knesset for Meretz and former deputy chief of the Israel Defense Forces.
- Itai Leshem, anti-corruption activist who described himself as a whistle blower aiming to expose an alleged bribe between PM Netanyahu and Facebook.
- Azi Nagar, social and political activist from Gilo, Jerusalem, and unsuccessful Knesset candidate for the party in the 2006 and 2009 Israeli legislative elections.
- Avi Shaked, businessman and 2021 Israeli Labor Party leadership election candidate.

== Campaign ==
On 26 February 2024, Yair Golan announced his candidacy. Golan is the former deputy chief of the Israel Defense Forces and a former Knesset member. Golan had first been elected to the Knesset in the September 2019 election on the list of the Democratic Union alliance. Golan was re-elected to the Knesset in 2020 and 2021 as part of Meretz and served until the party fell below the electoral threshold in 2022. Ahead of the 2022 election, Golan had run unsuccessfully in the 2022 Meretz leadership election. Golan had received praise within Israel for his actions to rescue those caught in the Re'im music festival massacre during Hamas' 7 October 2023 attack. In his campaign for Labor party leadership, Golan declared he wanted to merge Labor with Meretz under a "new political framework." Golan received endorsements from incumbent Labor MKs Gilad Kariv and Naama Lazimi. Leshem, Nagar, and Shaked entered the race after Golan. Shaked opposed merging Labor with Meretz, and criticized Golan as "a Trojan horse ... who suddenly comes out of nowhere and tries to steal our party."

Golan was perceived to the heavy front-runner in the election.

== Results ==
Ex-general and deputy minister Yair Golan won in a landslide, replacing outgoing Merav Michaeli as chairman and leader of the Israeli Labor Party.

Candidate	Votes	%
Yair Golan	29,832	95.15
Avi Shaked	592	1.89
Itai Leshem	551	1.76
Azi Nagar	241	0.77
None of the above	135	0.43
Total	31,351	100.00
Registered voters/turnout	52,044	–
Source: Labor Party

== Aftermath ==
Outgoing leader Merav Michaeli publicly congratulated Golan, writing, "Good luck to Yair and the party." Yair Lapid, leader of the Yesh Atid party, also publicly congratulated Golan.

The following month, it was announced that Labor and Meretz agreed to merge into a new party, called The Democrats, pending approval of the deal by their respective bodies. Several weeks later, the two parties approved the merger.
