= 2020 Labour Party leadership election =

Labour Party leadership elections were held in the following countries in 2020:

- 2020 Labour Party leadership election (Ireland)
- 2020 Scottish Labour deputy leadership election
- 2020 Labour Party leadership election (UK)
  - Nominations in the 2020 Labour Party leadership election
  - 2020 Labour Party deputy leadership election
    - Nominations in the 2020 Labour Party deputy leadership election
- 2020 ACT Labor Party leadership election in Australia

== See also ==
- 2019 Labour Party leadership election
- 2021 Labour Party leadership election
