= 2021 Tasmanian Labor Party leadership election =

24 May−15 June 2021	2024 →
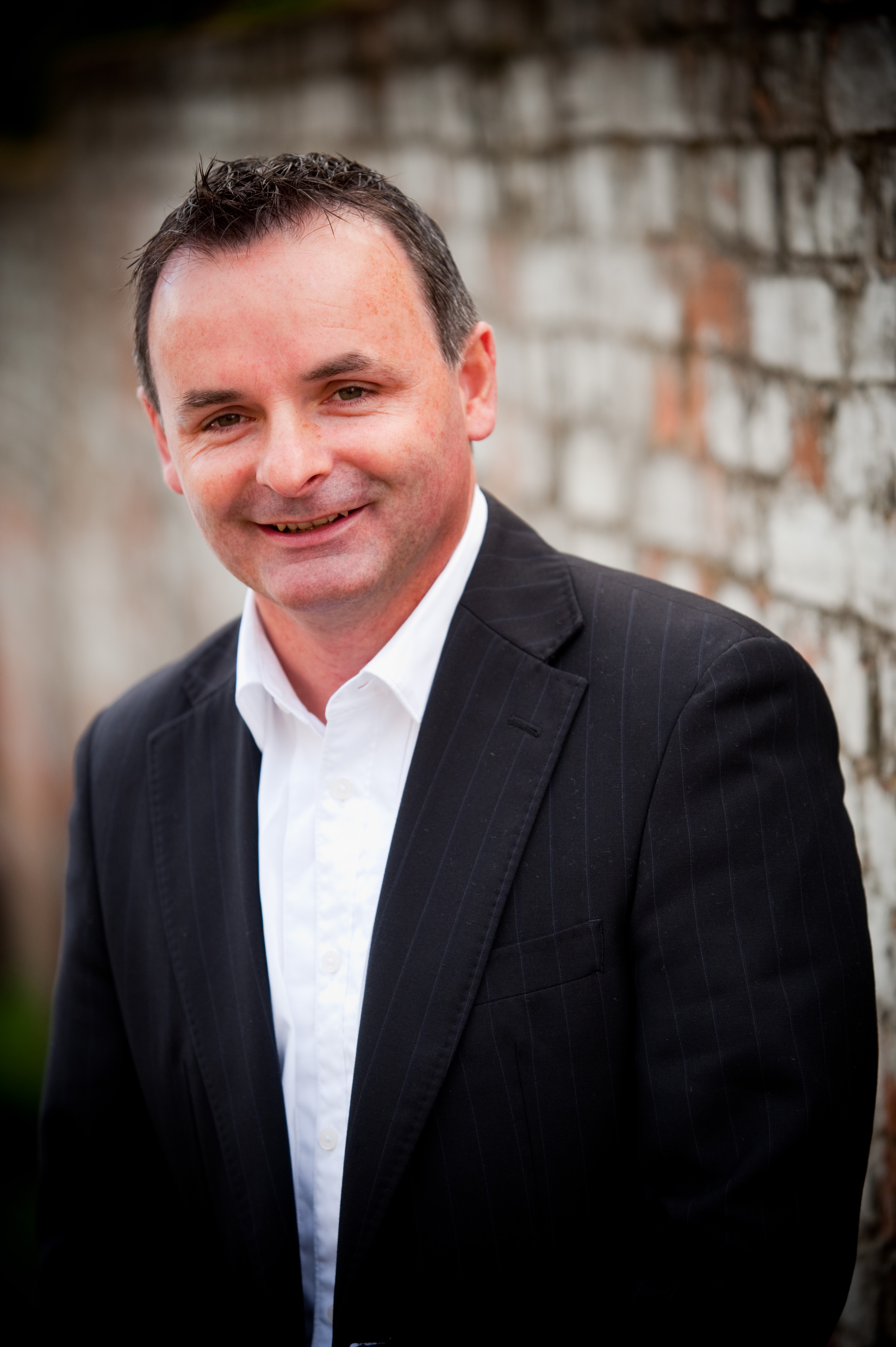
		ALP
Candidate	David O'Byrne	Shane Broad
Percentage	73.5%	26.5%
Party members	72.0%	28.0%
State delegates	75.0%	25.0%
Seat	Franklin	Braddon
Leader before election
Anita Dow (interim)
Elected Leader
David O'Byrne

The 2021 Tasmanian Labor Party leadership election was a leadership vote that was held between 24 May and 15 June 2021 to elect a new leader of the Tasmanian Labor Party following the resignation of Rebecca White. Ballots of members and delegates to the party conference took place to elect a new leader, with both ballots being weighted equally to determine the results. Shadow Treasurer and Franklin MP David O'Byrne was elected to the role, with 72% of members' support, and 75% of delegates' support.

== Background ==
In the snap 2021 Tasmanian state election, the Labor Party failed to win government, with the Tasmanian Liberals winning a third consecutive term of majority government. Incumbent Labor leader Rebecca White initially expressed a desire to remain as leader, saying on 6 May 2021 that "I think that, at 38, I still have a lot to offer the parliament and the people of Tasmania and I thank the people of Lyons for returning me. I am committed to doing this job for as long as it takes to see a Labor government returned." However, on 15 May 2021, she said that she felt a change of leadership was necessary, and resigned her position, endorsing David O'Byrne to take up the leadership position.

On 14 May 2021, before White's resignation, Braddon MP Shane Broad said that he would consider running for the leadership if White did not, saying that "what we need to do is reconnect with people who used to vote Labor so that they'll vote Labor again", and that "if Rebecca decides for whatever reason that she's not going to stand for the leadership then I'm considering my options".

== Voting ==
Two votes took place, which were weighted equally to determine the results. A 22-day voting period occurred from 24 May to 15 June for party members to elect a candidate, with ballots mailed out on 24 May and online voting available from 28 May to 15 June. Delegates at the party's state conference were also able to vote during the party conference. The ballot is the first to be conducted under such a model, after Labor Party rules were changed in 2018. Before the rule change, both party members, conference delegates and state Labor MPs had an equal one-third weighting in the leadership vote.

== Candidates ==
=== Declared ===
- David O'Byrne — shadow treasurer and MP for Franklin
- Shane Broad — MP for Braddon

== Campaign ==
Shane Broad announced his leadership candidacy on 17 May 2021. In an interview with ABC Radio Hobart on the same day, he told anchor Leon Compton that he was running to "stop what is the domination of a hard left factional group of power brokers that I believe have delivered three election losses in row". Broad also said there was "growing frustration among the moderate voices" in Labor. David O'Byrne, in response to Broad's candidacy, declared that "The thing about the Labor Party is we actually quite like each other. We occasionally have differences of opinion about a way forward, and what I think we're seeing here is a good robust exchange of ideas for the future of the party." It was announced on the same day as Broad's announcement that Anita Dow will serve as interim leader.

== Results ==
The result of the vote was announced on 15 June 2021. Over 1200 party members voted in the leadership ballot.

Full result
Candidate	Party members	State delegates	Total
Candidate	%	%	%
David O'Byrne	72.0%	75.0%	73.5%
Shane Broad	28.0%	25.0%	26.5%

== Aftermath ==
Two weeks later, 30 June, sexual harassment allegations against O'Byrne emerged. He was accused of sexually harassing a junior female union employee in 2007 and 2008 before he entered parliament. O'Byrne resigned as leader on 7 July 2021 after 22 days into the job, and White was re-elected as leader on the same day.

== See also ==
- 2021 Tasmanian state election
