= 2023 Labour Party leadership election =

Labour Party leadership elections were held in the following countries during 2023:

- 2023 New Zealand Labour Party leadership election
- 2023 Queensland Labor Party leadership election in Australia
- 2023 Territory Labor Party leadership election in Australia
- 2023 Victorian Labor Party leadership election in Australia
- 2023 Western Australian Labor Party leadership election in Australia

== See also ==
- 2022 Labour Party leadership election
- 2024 Labour Party leadership election
