= Itzik Shmuli =

Israeli politician

- אִיצִיק שְמוּלִי
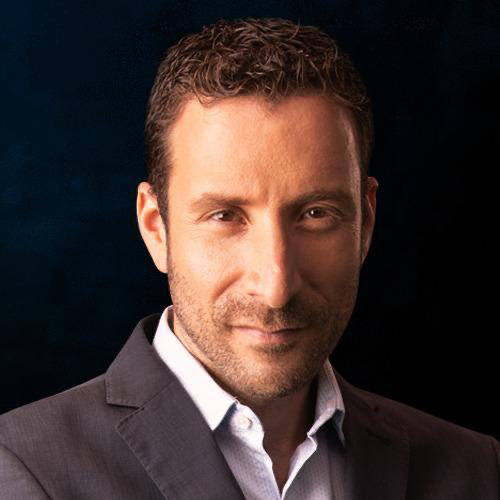
- Shmuli in 2021

Ministerial roles
- 2020–2021: Ministry of Labor, Social Affairs and Social Services

Faction represented in the Knesset
- 2013–2015: Labor Party
- 2015–2019: Zionist Union
- 2019–2021: Labor Party

Personal details
- Born: 8 February 1980 (age 46) Tel Aviv, Israel

Yitzhak (Itzik) Shmuli (Hebrew: אִיצִיק שְמוּלִי; born 8 February 1980) is an Israeli politician who served as the Minister of Labor, Welfare and Social Services and as a Member of the Knesset on behalf of the Israeli Labor Party; formerly chairman of National Union of Israeli Students, and one of the leaders of the 2011 Israeli social justice protests. Shmuli currently serves as UJA-Federation of New York's Director-General in its Israel office.

== Biography ==
Yitzhak (Itzik) Shmuli was born in Tel Aviv, Israel on 8 February 1980, to Nechama and Chaim Shmuli. His family originated from Iraq, he is maternal of Kurdish descent. At the age of 3, his family moved to Ramat Gan, and He attended Yitzhak Rabin Tichon Hadash High School in Ramat Gan In 1998, Shmuli enlisted in the Israel Defense Force Armored Corps and served as a tank commander of the 7th Armored Brigade's 82nd Battalion in Israel and Lebanon. At 23, he traveled to Argentina, helping to establish and operate an orphanage in Buenos Aires as a volunteer.

After returning to Israel in 2004, Shmuli attended Oranim Academic College, and graduated with a B.Ed. with Honors in Special Education and Social-Community Action. During his first year at Oranim, he was elected head of the Student Union. In that position, he led a campaign against the Shochat Committee, which sought to privatize higher education and raise tuition fees. In the beginning of 2009, Shmuli was elected deputy chairman of the National Union of Israeli Students, unifying the Israeli Students Organization with the Union of Israeli Students the two largest student unions in Israel. He led the student negotiating team in discussions on comprehensive reform in the higher education system. Key reforms included increasing contract workers into higher education institutions and advocating for community service requirements for undergraduate courses.

in 2010 he went on to study a Master of Public Policy from The Hebrew University of Jerusalem and a Master of Laws at Bar-Ilan University. In October 2010, he was elected as chairman of National Union of Israeli Students, the first representative elected from one of Israel's colleges. As chairman, he served on the Council for Higher Education and directed other National Union of Israeli Students ventures including Issta Lines touring company. He served on the board of directors of the Civic Trust organization.

Shmuli was one of the leaders of the 2011 Israeli social justice protests in advocating for housing and cost of living expenses affecting the middle and lower class of Israelis. He successfully rallied student associations to actively support the protest, expanding demonstration participation across Israel, He conducted speeches at most rallies across the country. In August 2011, he was among a group of protest leaders who met with President Shimon Peres. In November 2011, Shmuli relocated to the city of Lod and initiated a social action campaign to strengthen the city stating. In July 2012, Shmuli resigned from his position as chairman of the National Union of Israeli Students.

== Political career ==
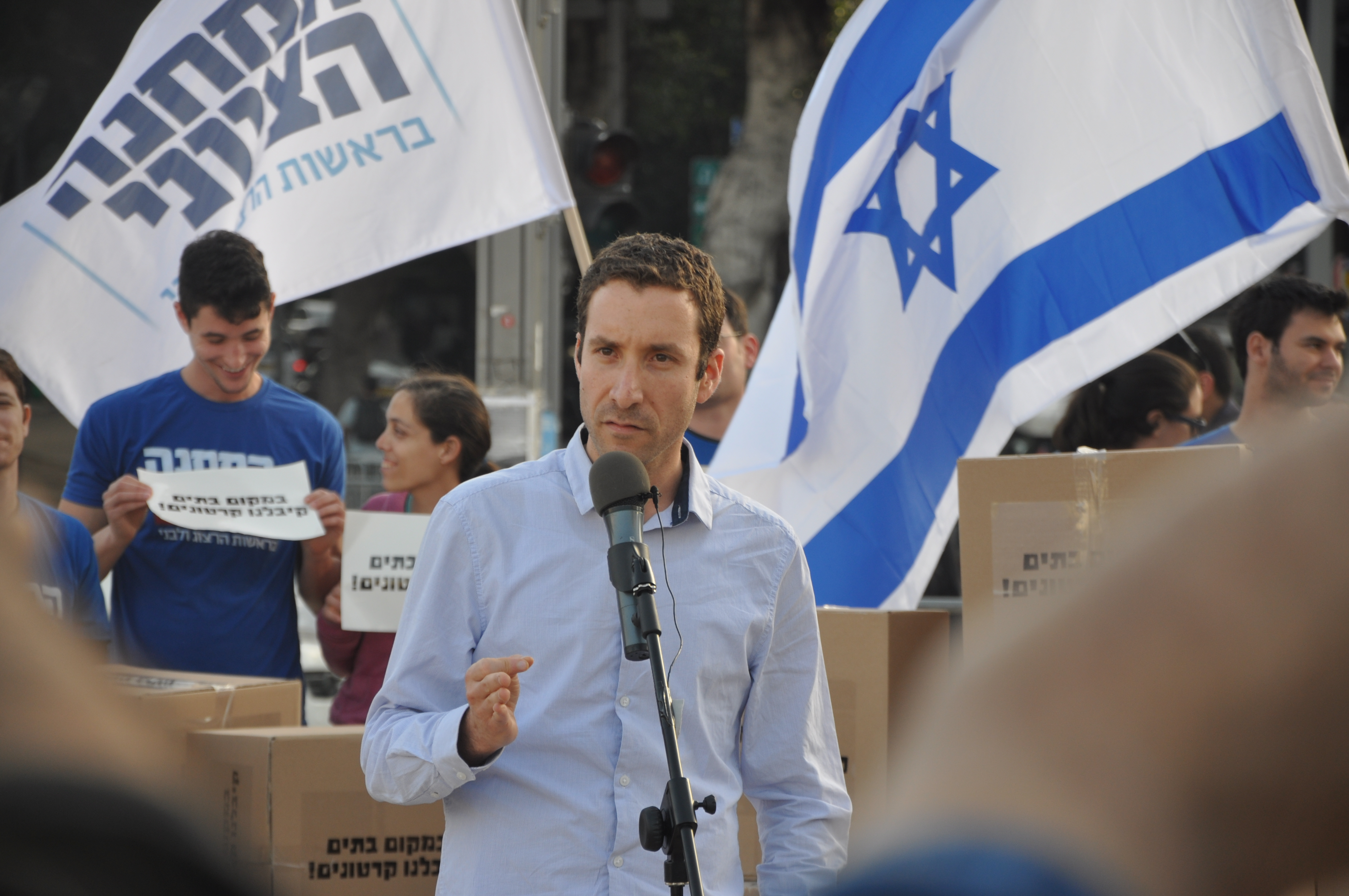
Itzik Shmuli, 2015

Shmuli was a member of the Israeli Labor Party, serving in the Knesset from 2012 to 2021. Shmuli represented the Zionist Union Political Alliance. In October 2012, Shmuli announced his intention to run in the Israeli Labor Party primaries for the 19th Knesset. Shmuli was placed in the party's 11th slot for the Knesset list. In the 19th Knesset, Shmuli served as a member of the Economic Affairs Committee and participated in bills to improve equality for veterans, promote financial education and subsidised housing. Shmuli headed several lobbies in the Knesset, including the Retirees Lobby, the Lobby for Lone Soldiers, the Affordable Housing Lobby, the Animal Lobby and the Lobby for Pluralistic Judaism against Religious Fanaticism.

In July 2015, following a stabbing incident at Jerusalem's gay pride parade, Shmuli wrote in an article to Yedioth Ahronoth that "when the knife is raised around the neck of an entire LGBT community, my community, it will not stop there"; in this article, he became the first Knesset Member who came out of the closet during his term. In elections for the 20th Knesset, Shmuli was placed fifth on the list of the Zionist Union, after reaching third place in the Labor primaries, and was thus elected to the 20th Knesset. In 2019, following the 23rd Knesset elections Shmuli, on behalf of the Labour faction was appointed Minister of Labour, Social Affairs and Social Services as part of the 35th Israeli Government.

On 17 May 2020, Shmuli joined the Israeli Cabinet after being sworn in as Minister of Labor, Social Affairs and Social Services, also known as Minister of Welfare. After taking office, in May 2020 amid the COVID-19 pandemic, Shmuli allocated $10B+ NIS to the welfare system as emergency funds to be awarded to families who lost employment due to the pandemic. To aid with retraining of skilled labour, Shmuli allocated an additional $300M NIS to vocational training systems. During his term, he worked on reforms to the Disability Benefits Act, increased funding of NIS $2B to the disabled population and made alterations to pension contributions, improving accessibility of work for this demographic. In August 2020, Shmuli initiated the Magen Zahav program, addressing welfare concerns for elderly people during COVID-19, applying a budget of NIS $150M in welfare payments. This program engaged the Israel Defence Force and initiated the ‘Friends in Uniform’ Initiative, connecting soldiers with elderly citizens in the community.

As Minister of Labour, Shmuli established inter-ministerial teams to support the LGBTQ community, resulting in legislation changes around adoption and assisted sperm donation, and providing legal assistance and expenses of overseas surrogacy proceedings. He also initiated programs to improve health and social access to the LGBTQ community, opening 6 outreach centres. In February 2021 After the election of Merav Michaeli as chair of the Labour Party, Shmuli announced that he was resigning from the Knesset and ministerial roles to take a break from politics, stating that it had been a mistake to join the Netanyahu government. In August 2021, he was appointed director-general of UJA-Federation of New York's Israel. In that capacity, he serves as the organization's senior representative in Israel.

== Social activism ==
Shmuli supports a range of social causes, representing groups and causes including foreign workers and their children, military veterans, contract workers and employee rights, LGBTQ equality, student rights and quality of education.

== Awards and recognition ==
In 2016 Shmuli was awarded "Itur ha’Or" award for work on behalf of Holocaust Survivors and the Ometz Medal for outstanding social achievements. in 2018 he was awarded "The Outstanding Parliamentarian Award" from the Israel Democracy Institute.

== Personal life ==
Shmuli lives in Moshav Ksalon in the Judean Mountains. In 2019, Shmuli and his partner Eran Levy welcomed their first son, and in 2021 welcomed their second son; both born via surrogacy in the United States.
