= 2022 Israeli Labor Party leadership election =

Israeli Labor Party leadership election

- 18 July 2022

vote by general membership of party
- Turnout: 43%
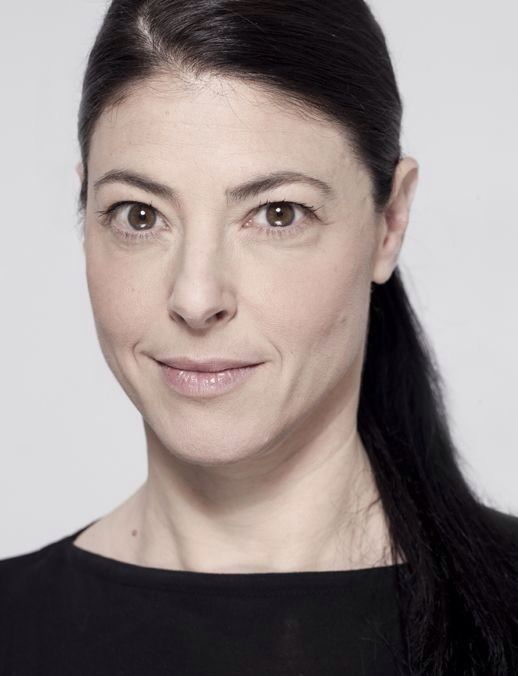

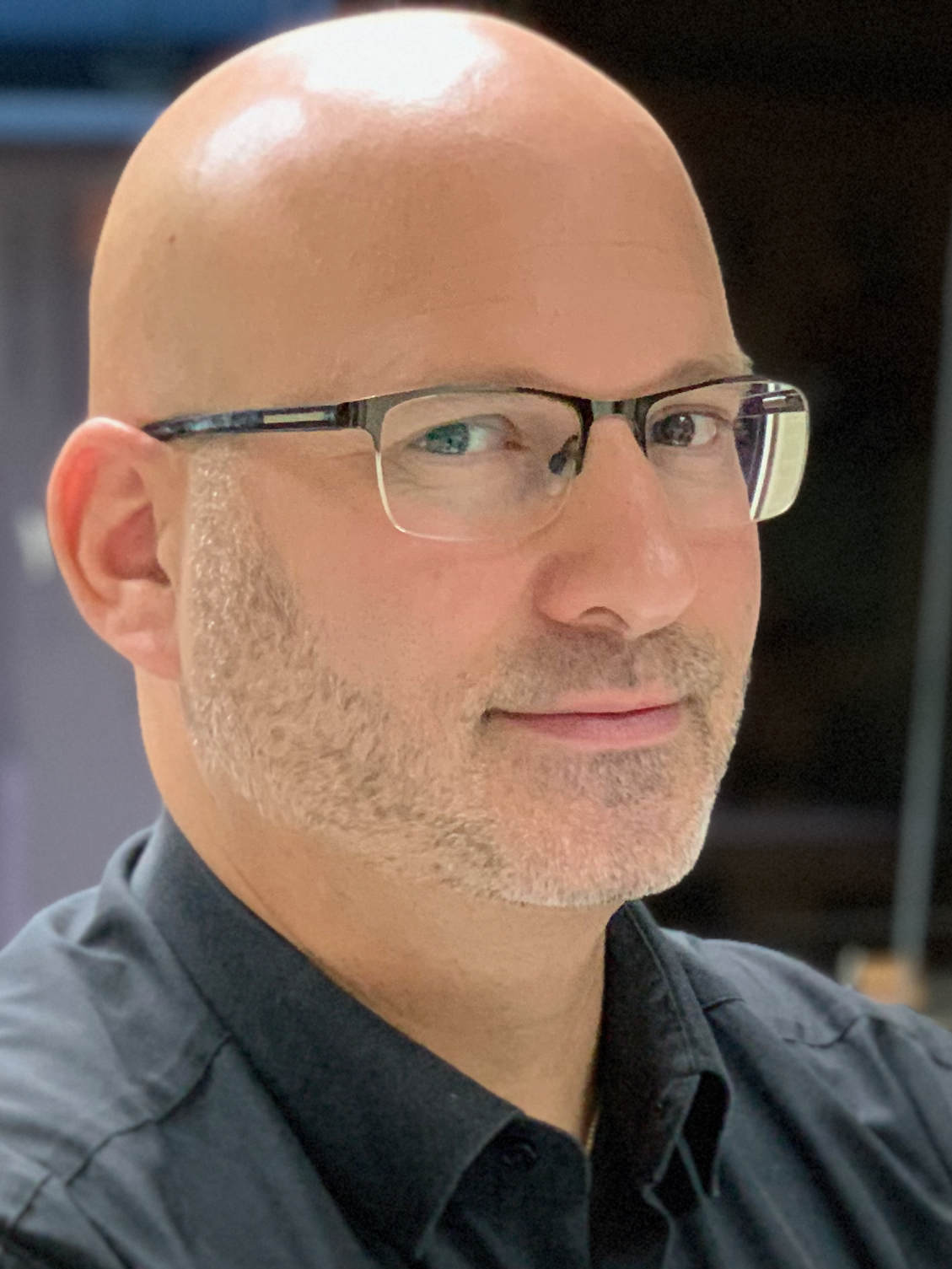
Candidate	Merav Michaeli	Eran Hermoni
Popular vote	12,429	2,435
Percentage	82.48%	16.16%
Leader before election
Merav Michaeli
Elected Leader
Merav Michaeli

The 2022 Israeli Labor Party leadership election was held on 18 July 2022 to elect the leader of the Israeli Labor Party in the lead-up to the 2022 Israeli legislative election. The election saw the incumbent party leader, Merav Michaeli, reelected with 82% of the vote, fending off a challenge by party secretary Eran Hermoni. Michaeli's victory made her the first Labor Party leader to win consecutive leadership contests since leadership elections were first opened to the party's full membership in 1992.

== Background ==
Michaeli was first elected to the leadership of the Israeli Labor Party in 2021. Following the dissolution of the Knesset on 30 June 2022, the party scheduled elections for the leadership of the party and for its party list, to be held on 18 July and 9 August, respectively.

== Candidates ==
- Eran Hermoni, lawyer and secretary-general of the Israeli Labor Party
- Merav Michaeli, incumbent party leader since 2021 and incumbent minister of transportation since 2021

== Campaign ==
Hermoni challenged Michaeli using the slogan "Labor in the center", calling for the creation of a broad coalition of the political left. He criticized Labor under Michaeli's vision as becoming a "niche" and "enclosed" party that "fights for crumbs of votes against Meretz." While Michaeli had ruled out a merger with Meretz for the 2022 election, it was seen as likely Hermoni would pursue such a merger. Hermoni felt that the Labor Party had become too left-wing on issues of diplomacy and security.

Michaeli touted her leadership of the party in the 2021 Knesset election, having seen the party rebound and finish above the electoral threshold under her leadership. She declared that she would rebuild the party, "to fulfill its unique mission as the ruling party of the center-left," and would push to have the party play, "a leading role in Israeli politics." Ahead of the vote, Michaeli was largely expected to win reelection.

== Result ==
Michaeli won a strong victory, becoming the first Labor Party leader to win consecutive leadership contests since party leadership elections were first opened to the party's general membership in 1992. The last Labor Party leader to have won consecutive leadership contests had been Shimon Peres in 1984.

Candidate	Votes	%
Merav Michaeli	12,429	82.48
Eran Hermoni	2,435	16.16
None of the above	206	1.37
Total	15,070	100.00
Registered voters/turnout		43
Source: Davar
