= 2022 Territory Labor Party leadership election =

2022 Northern Territory Labor Party leadership election

2022 Northern Territory Labor Party leadership election
- 13 May 2022
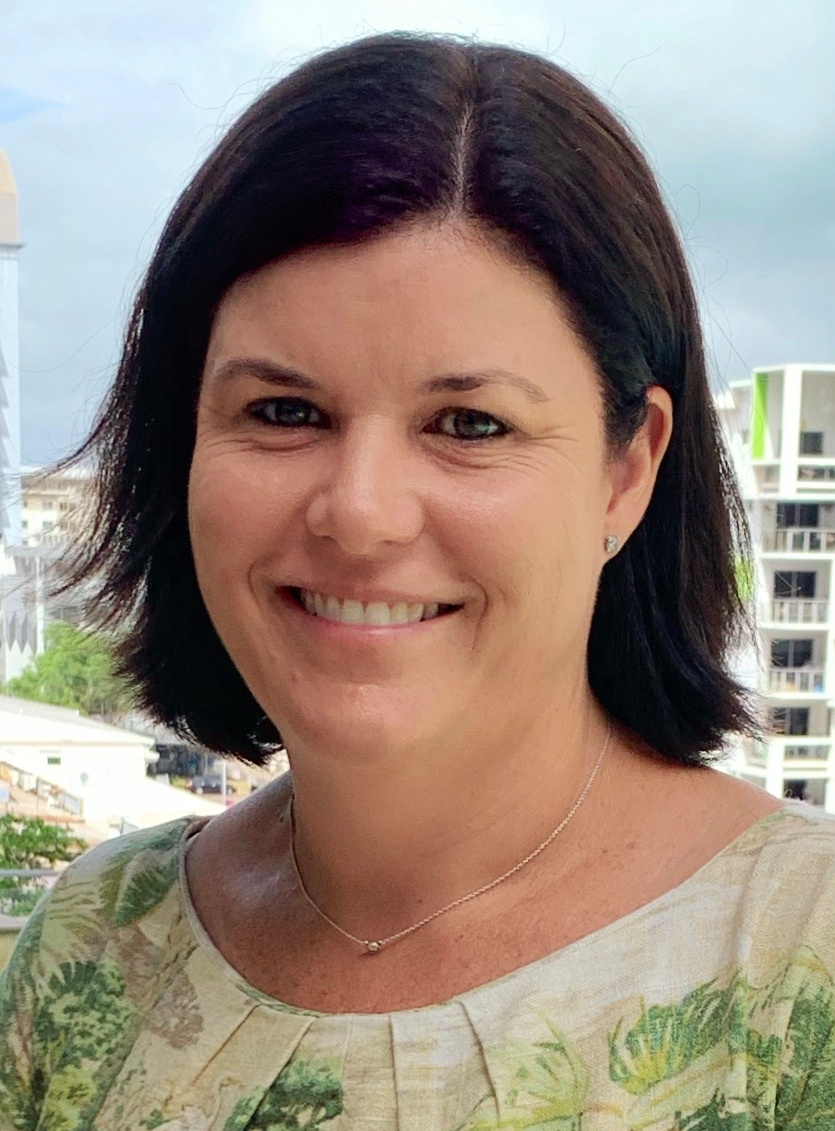
Candidate	Natasha Fyles
Result	Unopposed
Seat	Nightcliff
Faction	Left
Leader before election
Michael Gunner
Elected Leader
Natasha Fyles

A leadership election was held in May 2022 to determine the successor to Michael Gunner as leader of the Territory Labor Party and Chief Minister of the Northern Territory. Gunner announced his pending resignation on 10 May, following the birth of his second son and announcement of the 2022/23 Northern Territory budget. The leadership was confirmed unopposed; Natasha Fyles was elected as Leader, with Nicole Manison, a member of the right faction, remaining as Deputy Leader.

While there was speculation of whether Fyles would run for the leadership position, the caucus remained silent and no candidates formally declared until they met on 13 May 2022 and all fourteen members of the caucus elected Fyles as leader of the Labor party and ultimately Chief Minister of the Northern Territory.

Fyles walked out of the Labor party caucus room and addressed the Northern Territory as the newly elected Chief Minister.

== Candidates ==
=== Declared ===
Name		Positions	Faction	Announced
Natasha Fyles	Attorney General of the Northern Territory (2016-2020) Minister for Health (2016–present) Member of the Legislative Assembly for Nightcliff (2012–present)	Left	13 May 2022	

=== Declined ===
While no candidates officially declined to run, only one candidate declared themselves as an individual running for the position of Labor party leader.
