= 2024 Tasmanian Labor Party leadership election =

Political party leadership election in an Australian state

- 10 April 2024
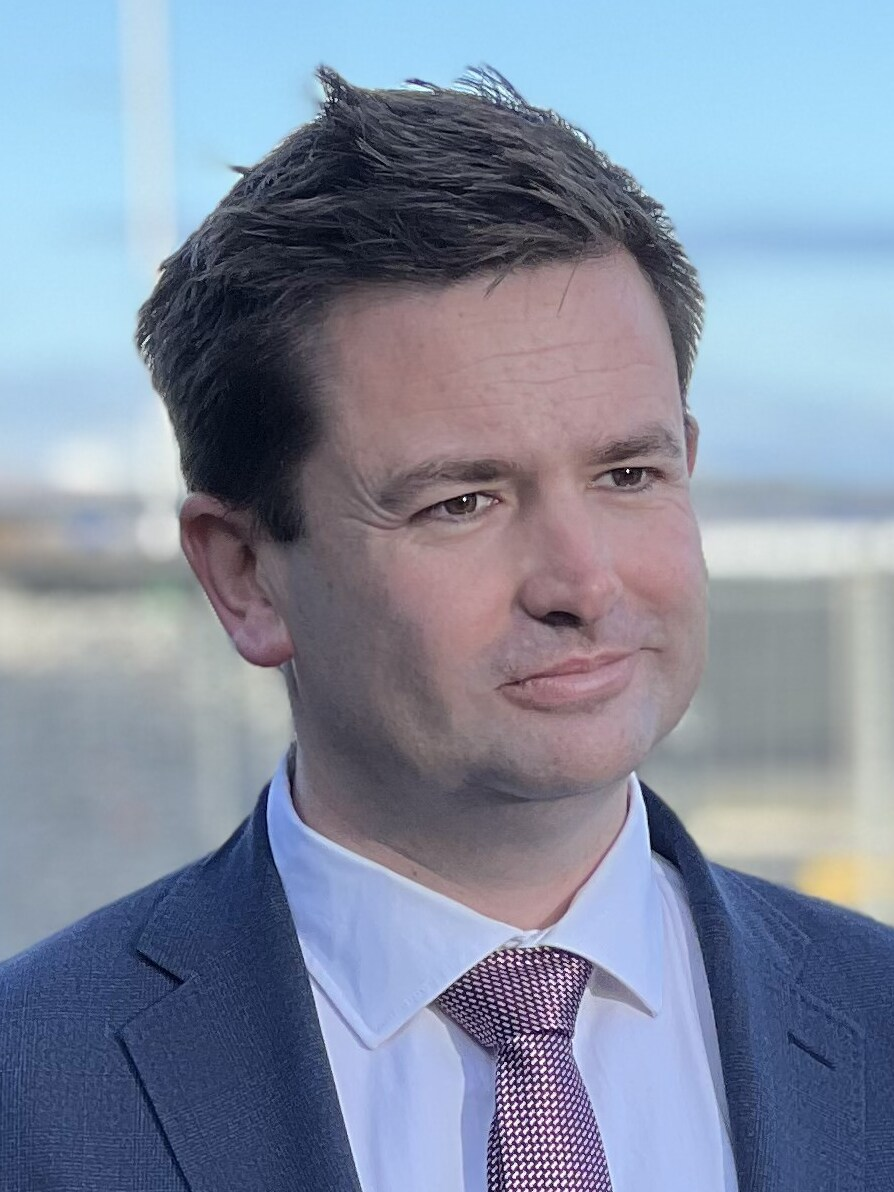
Candidate	Dean Winter
Caucus vote	Unopposed
Seat	Franklin
Faction	Right
Leader before election
Rebecca White
Left
Elected Leader
Dean Winter
Right

The 2024 Tasmanian Labor Party leadership election was held on 10 April 2024 to elect a new leader of the Tasmanian Labor Party. The election was triggered by the resignation of Rebecca White after Labor lost the Tasmanian state election, the third consecutive loss under her leadership and fourth consecutive loss overall.

Dean Winter of the Labor Right faction was elected unopposed.
