= Merav Michaeli =

Israeli politician (born 1966)

- מרב מיכאלי
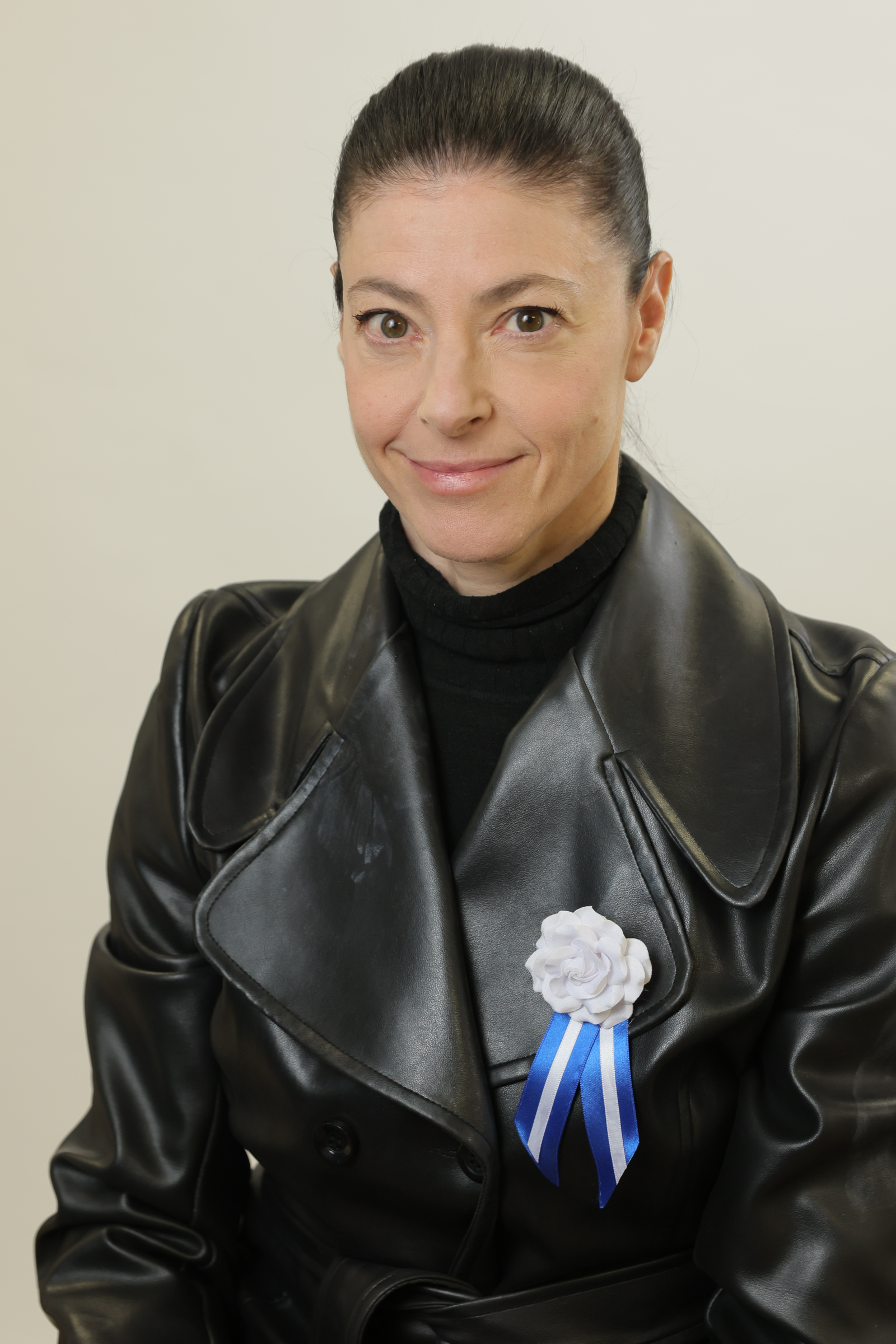
- Michaeli in 2023

Ministerial roles
- 2021–2022: Minister of Transport

Faction represented in the Knesset
- 2013–2015: Labor Party
- 2015–2019: Zionist Union
- 2019–2024: Labor Party
- 2024–2026: The Democrats

Other roles
- 2021–2024: Leader of the Labor Party

Personal details
- Born: 24 November 1966 (age 59) Petah Tikva, Israel
- Party: Democrats (since 2024)
- Other political affiliations: Labor (2012–2024)
- Domestic partner(s): Erez Tal (1987–1994); Lior Schleien (since 2007)
- Children: 3
- Occupation: Journalist • Politician

Merav Michaeli (Hebrew: מרב מיכאלי; born 24 November 1966) is an Israeli public leader, politician, journalist, media personality, TV anchor, radio broadcaster, feminist, and activist. She served as a member of the Knesset for the Labor from 2015 to 2026. She served as leader of the Labor Party from 2021 until 2024, as Minister of Transport in the thirty-sixth government of Israel and a member of the security cabinet.

Michaeli began her public career in Israeli media as a television and radio presenter, and later worked as a columnist for Haaretz. In 1997, she founded Ezrat Nashim, a public initiative associated with rape crisis centers, sexual-assault awareness, and support for survivors. Her activism focused on sexual violence, gender equality, civil rights, and Israeli-Palestinian peace advocacy.

Michaeli was first elected to the Knesset in the 2013 election as a member of the Israeli Labor Party. During her parliamentary career, she initiated, co-sponsored, promoted, or supported legislation related to sexual harassment, legal aid for victims of sex offenses, equal pay, domestic violence, family law, debtors’ rights, Holocaust survivor assistance, disability rights, and public-service protections. In the twentieth Knesset, she served as opposition whip and helped establish an opposition coordination forum. She was elected leader of the Labor Party in January 2021 and led the party into the March 2021 election, in which it won seven seats. Labor subsequently joined the thirty-sixth government of Israel, and Michaeli was appointed Minister of Transport and Road Safety and a member of the security cabinet. In December 2023, she announced that she would not seek another term as leader of the Labor Party.

Michaeli is also known for her long-standing use of gender-inclusive Hebrew and for her role in normalizing feminist language and sexual-violence advocacy in Israeli public life. Her use of gender-inclusive Hebrew became one of her most recognized public practices and was connected to broader advocacy on gender-based violence, equal pay, women’s representation, democratic participation, and peace. Her public influence was recognized by Globes, which selected her as one of its “People of the Year” in 2021 and included her in its 2022 “50 Most Influential Women” list. Forbes Israel ranked her first on its 2022 “Power Women” list. Calcalist ranked her ninth in its 2021 “100 Most Influential” list and twenty-eighth in its 2022 list. TheMarker also included her in its 2021 “100 Most Influential” project.

== Early life and family background ==
Michaeli was born in Petah Tikva to Ami Michaeli and Suzan Kastner, of Hungarian Jewish background. Her paternal grandfather was Nehemia Michaeli, a Mapam figure and the party’s last secretary before its merger into Meretz. Her maternal grandfather was Dr. Israel Rudolf (Rezső) Kastner, the Hungarian-Jewish journalist, lawyer, and Labor Zionist activist known for his controversial wartime negotiations to rescue Jews during the Holocaust. Michaeli referred to Kastner’s rescue efforts in her maiden Knesset speech on 27 February 2013.

On her maternal side, Michaeli is also descended from Dr. József / Josef Fischer, the father of Kastner’s wife, Elizabeth Fischer. Fischer was a Hungarian-Romanian Jewish lawyer, Zionist communal leader, and member of the Romanian Parliament. YIVO identifies him as the head of the Neolog community of Cluj and president of the Jewish Party in the Romanian Parliament, while Jewish Telegraphic Agency reporting from the period listed him among Jewish deputies elected to the Romanian Parliament. A Davar obituary described Fischer as a major figure in Jewish national education and Zionist organizational life, including leadership in the Zionist organization “Brit.” Yad Vashem’s material on Northern Transylvania places Fischer among the Jewish communal leaders connected to the administration of the Kolozsvár/Cluj ghetto during the Holocaust.

Michaeli was active in the Israeli Scouts during her youth, where biographical profiles describe her as having held leadership roles. She later completed a year of national service in Yeruham before beginning her military service. In a December 2020 interview, she described how her upbringing, Scouts activity in Petah Tikva, and service year in Yeruham shaped her understanding of class inequality and social policy.

“I grew up in Petah Tikva in a very middle-class home: my mother was a homemaker until I was in fifth grade, and only then went to study nursing; my father was an electronics technician. It’s not as if I came from some privileged background. I also grew up in a very socialist home. My grandparents were members of Mapam’s central committee, and the language of workers’ rights was always present. When I was a counselor in the Sha’ariya neighborhood, the gap between them and me was not that dramatic. It was not a sudden ‘lightbulb moment,’ but more a situation in which the words took on a concrete form. The gap between a neighborhood in Petah Tikva and Yeruham, a few years later, when I did a year of national service, was much more significant. There, I understood how gaps are created—not the mere knowledge that gaps exist, because that was something I had grown up with from the age of zero. You place a group of people in the middle of the desert, without giving that place the tools and means to develop, and then, of course, it does not really develop. And the women and men who live there have fewer opportunities and worse conditions. From the time I was very young, my mother taught us to treat every person with one hundred percent respect, whether it was the guard or the cleaner, regardless of their background. You do not pass by another person without saying hello. As a child, that was a very central lesson.”

== Media and journalism career ==
=== Radio ===
Michaeli began her public career during her military service as a newscaster on Army Radio, then one of Israel’s most prominent public radio stations. She remained connected to the IDF radio system as a civilian for roughly a decade, hosting and producing programs. She was involved in the creation of Galgalatz, the military’s music and traffic station, suggested its name, and served as its first director. In 1996, after commercial radio became possible in Israel, she helped establish Radio Tel Aviv, where she hosted a popular morning program and served as program director.

=== Television ===
Beginning in 1988, Michaeli became one of the main sports presenters for Sports View on Channel 1. She also presented Sabbath Game alongside Yoram Arbel, Nissim Kiviti, and Uri Levy, and hosted studio broadcasts during the Seoul Olympics in 1988 and the Los Angeles Olympics in 1992. At the same time, she presented the television program Ro’im 6/6 on Israeli Educational Television.

Her breakthrough in talk television came with the launch of Channel 2, when she created and hosted the original program Shishi Chai, which premiered in 1993. She later hosted other talk and interview programs, including Ad Eser in the mid-1990s and again in 1998, Merav Michaeli on Channel 3 in 2000, and a morning program on Channel 10 in 2003. She created and produced the documentary At Any Cost / At Any Price (2003), which included an interview with Eti Alon, and later hosted My God on Channel 2 and HOT News on Israel’s HOT cable network.

In January 2007, while anchoring HOT News, Michaeli drew national attention for a live on-air protest against comments surrounding the sexual-assault scandal involving then-President Moshe Katsav. Responding to public claims that one of Katsav’s accusers was unreliable because she had allegedly engaged in sex work, Michaeli delivered an unscripted statement about consent and victim-blaming. During the broadcast, she briefly pulled down her blouse to reveal her bra and said, “I came here in a very low-cut top, that doesn’t mean President Katsav is allowed to rape me.”

The segment, described by Ynet as “a very visual personal statement,” sparked controversy and led the production company JCS to summon her for an internal review later that day. Michaeli’s protest became part of a wider public debate over victim-blaming, consent, and the treatment of women who accuse powerful men of sexual violence. Media scholars later described the Katsav case as a watershed in Israeli public and media discourse on sexual violence against women. A narrative analysis of Israeli press coverage between 2006 and 2011 found that the case helped introduce a more feminist narrative around abuse of authority and sexual offenses.

=== Journalism and teaching ===
Michaeli wrote as a journalist and opinion columnist, including for Haaretz and the Women’s Media Center. She also taught and lectured on feminism, media, and communications at the College of Management’s School of Communications, Kotarot School of Journalism, Oranim Academic College, and Sapir Academic College.

Her published articles span more than two decades and cover social, feminist, and political themes that later shaped her parliamentary and ministerial agenda. Across op-eds in Haaretz and other outlets, Michaeli developed a critique of patriarchy, militarism, economic inequality, and democratic erosion, while advancing a feminist approach to language and public institutions.

== Activism before politics ==
=== Feminist activism and sexual-violence advocacy ===
In 1997, Michaeli founded Ezrat Nashim, a public initiative linked to rape crisis centers, sexual-assault awareness, and support for survivors. Her activism helped bring sexual violence, victim-blaming, and the treatment of survivors into mainstream Israeli public debate. The campaign drew support from women public figures, celebrities, male ministers, policymakers, and public personalities, and helped make it more legitimate in Israeli public life to identify as feminist and to discuss sexual assault openly.

Michaeli’s work in this period connected media activism with institutional change. Her public advocacy was later reflected in parliamentary work on police and court treatment of victims, victims’ status and rights, legal aid, and sexual-harassment law. She was also active in public protests against a plea deal for Moshe Katsav, who was later convicted and sentenced to prison for sex offenses.

=== Civil society, women’s organizations, and peace activism ===
During these years, Michaeli also served on the directorate of the Israel Women’s Network and in civil-society circles connected to women’s rights, civil marriage and divorce, eating disorders, and other feminist struggles.

Michaeli has also been active in Israeli-Palestinian peace advocacy and regional cooperation initiatives since before entering the Knesset. She served on the executive committee of the Israeli Peace Initiative, an organization that promoted an Israeli response to the Arab Peace Initiative and sought to advance a regional framework for Israeli-Arab and Israeli-Palestinian peace.

As a member of the Knesset, she continued this work through the Knesset Caucus for Regional Cooperation and policy forums connected to Track II-style diplomacy, Israeli-Arab cooperation, and Israeli-Palestinian peace.

== Political career ==
In October 2012 Michaeli announced that she was joining the Labor Party and intended to run for inclusion on Labor's list for the 2013 Knesset elections. On 29 November 2012, she won fifth place on the Labor Party's list, and was elected to the Knesset when Labor won 15 seats.

In preparation for the 2015 general election, the Labor and Hatnuah parties formed the Zionist Union alliance. Michaeli won the ninth slot on the Zionist Union list, and was elected to the Knesset as it won 24 seats.

Shortly before the end of the Knesset term, the Zionist Union was dissolved, with Labor and Hatnuah sitting in the Knesset as separate parties. Michaeli was placed seventh on the Labor list for the April 2019 elections, but lost her seat as Labor was reduced to six seats. However, she returned to the Knesset in August 2019 after Stav Shaffir resigned from the legislature. On 22 April 2020, after the 2020 Israeli legislative election, the then Labor party leader Amir Peretz announced that the Labor Party would join the unity government in the Netanyahu-Gantz coalition, but Michaeli rejected sitting in the coalition under Netanyahu.

She was elected to lead the Israeli Labor Party on 24 January 2021, after her predecessor, Amir Peretz, announced he would not stand for re-election. She announced, at the time, that her party would have gender equality on the party list; with a female-male rotation.

In the 2021 election, the party won seven seats, becoming part of the thirty-sixth government, with Michaeli as Minister of Transport and Road Safety. On 31 December 2021, she announced that the Tel Aviv central bus station would be closed within four years, reneging her promise to close it immediately.

Michaeli was re-elected to lead the Israeli Labor Party in July 2022. In the legislative election held later that year, Labor narrowly crossed the electoral threshold, receiving the bare minimum of four seats. Some blamed Michaeli's refusal to run jointly with the left wing Meretz for the latter party falling beneath the electoral threshold and enabling the formation of a new government formed by Benjamin Netanyahu. Michaeli was accused by prominent Meretz lawmaker Issawi Frej of 'delusions of grandeur'.

In 2023 she was one of the active participants in the anti-judicial reform protests. She rejected an invitation from Prime Minister Netanyahu to join the compromise talks at the president's residence.

On 7 December 2023 Michaeli called a press conference in which she stated her intention to hold a leadership election in April 2024 and that she would not run for another term. In February 2024, the party announced that the election would take place on 28 May. She was replaced in that election by Yair Golan.

In April 2024 Michaeli called for dismantling an army unit with a history of abuses (Netzah Yehuda Battalion), saying it is killing Palestinians “for no real reason.”

== Personal life ==
During the 1990s Michaeli was in a relationship with Israeli TV and radio producer and host Erez Tal.

Since 2007 Michaeli's partner is television producer, host, and comedian Lior Schleien. She lives in Tel Aviv, near Schleien. In a 2018 interview, Michaeli stated that she didn't feel sorry for not having children and that "she never wanted to become a mother". Despite this claim, in August 2021, Michaeli and Schleien's son was born in the United States by surrogate pregnancy. In April 2023 Michaeli announced that their second son had been born via surrogacy. In April 2025 the couple announced the birth of their third child, Noa.

Political offices
Preceded by Amir Peretz	Leader of the Israeli Labor Party; 2021–2024	Succeeded by Yair Golan
