= 2021 Israeli Labor Party leadership election =

Israeli Labor Party leadership election

- 24 January 2021

vote by general membership of party
- Turnout: 26.01%
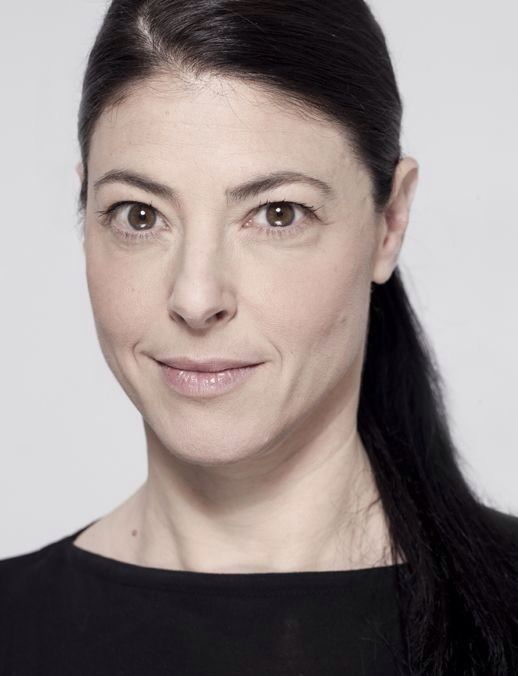

Candidate	Merav Michaeli	Avi Shaked
Popular vote	7,483	1,841
Percentage	77.54%	19.08%
Leader before election
Amir Peretz
Elected Leader
Merav Michaeli

The 2021 Israeli Labor Party leadership election was held on 24 January 2021 in the lead-up to the 2021 Israeli legislative election.

The candidates were Merav Michaeli, Avi Shaked, Yitzhak Taym, Gil Beilin, Navah Katz, David Landsman, and Ofer Segman. Michaeli won the leadership election with 77.5% of the vote.

== Background ==
Former Labor leader Amir Peretz was appointed Economy minister, while Itzik Shmuli was appointed as the head of the Labor, Social Affairs, and Social Services ministry in the Thirty-fifth government of Israel, despite Peretz promising to not join a Netanyahu-led government. Michaeli did not join the government.

Peretz announced on 23 December that he would neither run for the leadership of the party, nor run for a Knesset seat. He attempted to cancel the primaries, but the Tel Aviv District Court on 3 January 2021 ordered primaries to be held. Peretz appealed to the Supreme Court of Israel (which found in favor of Michaeli on 14 January and set the date of the election for 24 January).

== Results ==
Candidate	Votes	%
Merav Michaeli	7,483	77.54
Avi Shaked	1,841	19.08
Gil Beilin	229	2.37
Yitzhak Taym	37	0.38
Navah Katz	23	0.24
David Landsman	11	0.11
Ofer Segman	6	0.06
None of the above	21	0.22
Total	9,651	100.00
Registered voters/turnout	37,102	26.01
Source: ICE
