= Matthew Taylor (political strategist) =

British political strategist (born 1960)

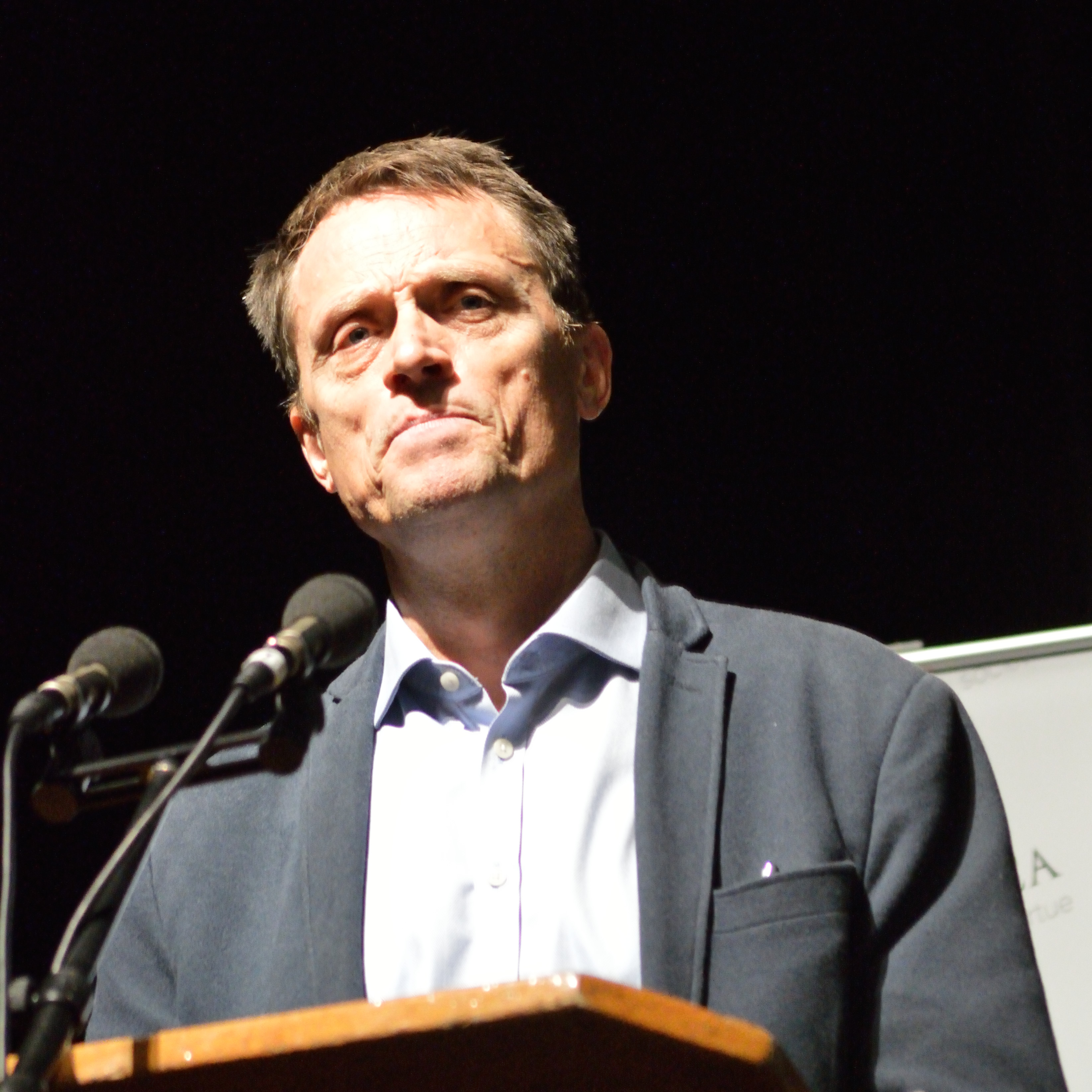
- Taylor in 2018
- Born: 5 December 1960 (age 65); London, England
- Known for: Chief executive, RSA
- Parent(s): Laurie Taylor; Jennie Howells
- Taylor's voice recorded 2012, as part of an audio description of the RSA for VocalEyes

Matthew Taylor CBE FAcSS (born 5 December 1960) is a British former political strategist, broadcaster and writer, and current chief executive of the NHS Confederation.

In 2005, he was appointed by prime minister Tony Blair as head of the Number 10 Policy Unit. In October 2016, he was appointed chair of the Review of Modern Employment established by prime minister Theresa May; the Taylor Review report Good Work was published in July 2017. A response to the report was published in Feb 2018 by Rt Hon Greg Clark MP then Secretary of State for Business, Energy and Industrial Strategy.

He was chief executive of the Royal Society for the Encouragement of Arts, Manufactures and Commerce (RSA) between 2006 and 2021. He has been a panellist on BBC Radio 4's Moral Maze since 2008.

== Background ==
Taylor is the only son of the sociologist and broadcaster Laurie Taylor and the historian Jennie Howells. He was educated at Emanuel School, the University of Southampton and the University of Warwick. He has three children.

While at the University of Southampton, Taylor wrote about Claire Holland's involvement in the 1983 CND badge controversy.

== Career ==
Taylor became a Labour Party county councillor in Warwickshire and unsuccessfully sought to become the Member of Parliament for Warwick and Leamington in the 1992 general election. In 1994 he was put in charge of the Labour Party's rebuttal operation, becoming a campaign co-ordinator and director of policy during the 1997 general election. He helped to write the Labour Party manifesto, the pledge-card, and developed Excalibur, a rapid rebuttal database for use against the Conservative Party. Taylor became assistant general secretary of the Labour Party under Margaret McDonagh, but after clashes with her left in December 1998.

Between 1998 and 2003, Taylor directed the Institute for Public Policy Research, a left-of-centre political think tank, and in 2003 the Labour prime minister Tony Blair appointed him head of the Number 10 Policy Unit, giving him the task of drawing up the Labour Party's manifesto for the May 2005 general election. Following the re-election of the Labour government he became chief adviser on strategy to the Prime Minister. Taylor was involved in several initiatives to engage the public with the political process, and played a role in developing the Labour Party's "Big Conversation" discussion forums.

He was among the four founders of the Labour Party-affiliated think tank Compass in 2003 alongside Neal Lawson of LLM Communications, Michael Jacobs of the Fabian Society and Tom Bentley of Demos.

He left his role at the Labour Party in 2006 to become the chief executive of the Royal Society of Arts charity. He remained there until 2021.

He has sat on governmental committees and inquiries on topics including higher education in Wales, the role of elected councillors, innovation in children's services and spinning out public services as social enterprises. He was interim Director of Labour Market Enforcement from August 2019 to January 2021.

He is a regular panellist on Radio 4's Moral Maze, devised and presents the discussion programme, Agree to Differ, which was first broadcast in 2014, and is an occasional presenter of Analysis. His opinion pieces have been published in several national newspapers, he has a monthly column with the Local Government Chronicle, writes occasional book reviews for Management Today and has contributed extended essays to publications such as Political Quarterly and written pamphlets and chapters for books.

As well as his annual RSA Chief Executive lecture, he is a regular public speaker on topics including public service reform, social trends and education policy. He has chaired lectures and conferences for many organisations including the RSA, the Heritage Lottery Fund, Intelligence Squared and the Cabinet Office.

He left the RSA in 2021, subsequently being appointed as the chief executive of the NHS Confederation.

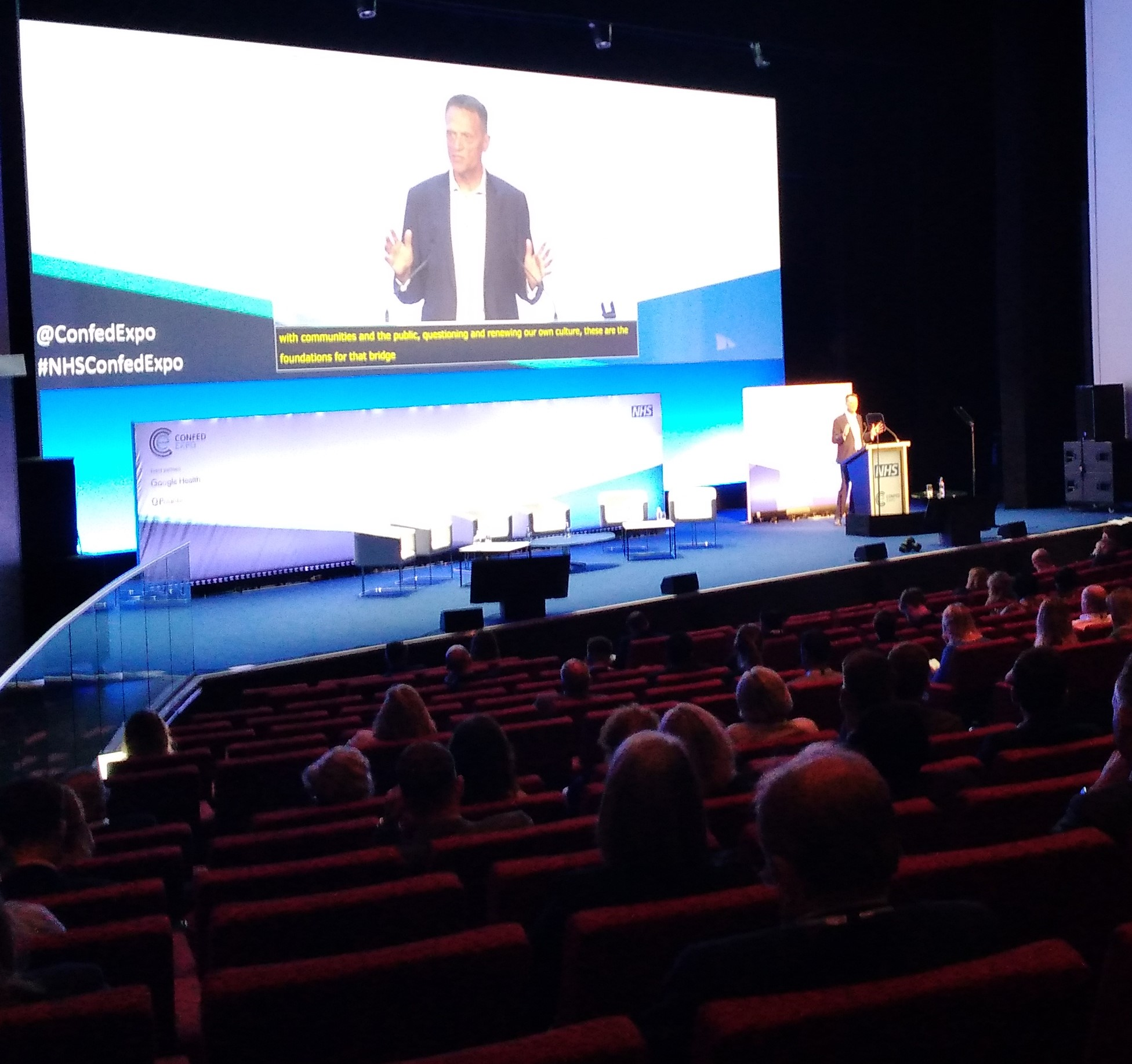
Matthew Taylor 2022

In 2024 he has argued for a renewed social contract for health and integrated care systems.

== Honours ==
In 2016, Taylor was elected a Fellow of the Academy of Social Sciences (FAcSS). He was appointed Commander of the Order of the British Empire (CBE) in the 2019 Birthday Honours for services to employee rights.

Taylor has been awarded honorary degrees from the universities of Brighton, Northampton and Warwick, and is a visiting professor at Nottingham Trent University.
