= Compass (think tank) =

British pressure group

- Formation: 2003; 23 years ago
- Founders: Tom Bentley; Michael Jacobs; Neal Lawson; Matthew Taylor
- Location: United Kingdom
- Members: 3000+
- Director: Neal Lawson
- Website: compassonline.org.uk

Compass is a British progressive political organisation and pressure group founded in 2003. Based in London, it campaigns for a more equal, democratic, and sustainable society: a vision it describes as the "Good Society". Established as a Labour Party internal pressure group, it later opened its membership to supporters of all political parties and none, positioning itself as a cross-party home for the broader progressive movement in the United Kingdom.

== Overview ==
Compass describes itself as "the home for everyone who wants to be part of a much more equal, democratic and sustainable future." It operates as a membership organisation, a publisher of political ideas, and a campaign group. Compass seeks to work across party lines to build alliances between Labour, the Liberal Democrats, the Green Party, the Scottish National Party, Plaid Cymru, the then Women's Equality Party, and others.

== History ==
Founding (2003)

Compass was launched in 2003 by Tom Bentley of Demos, Michael Jacobs of the Fabian Society, Neal Lawson, editor of the socio-democratic journal Renewal, and Matthew Taylor of the Institute for Public Policy Research. The organisation began with a letter published in The Guardian in September of that year, called A Vision for the Democratic Left. Supported by a number of academics and figures in The Labour Party unhappy with the political direction of Prime Minister Tony Blair, this was the first attempt by Compass to guide the Labour government.

Compass initially operated within the Labour Party, with membership restricted to Labour Party members or those unaffiliated with any other party. Its founding impulse was a sense that the New Labour government, despite its large parliamentary majority, was failing to use a historic political opportunity to transform the United Kingdom into a significantly more equal, democratic, and sustainable society.

In its early years, Compass focused on developing a vision of a "Good Society" and acting as a hub for the democratic left within Labour. During this period, the organisation claimed several concrete policy successes, including: opposing ninety-day detention without trial, opposing the privatisation of Royal Mail, and advocating for a windfall tax on bankers' bonuses.

Opening up membership (2011)

After roughly a decade, Compass members came to the conclusion that a reformed Labour Party, while necessary, was not sufficient to deliver a Good Society on its own. Following extensive deliberation and consultation, members voted to open full membership to supporters of other political parties. The organisation describes this as a defining moment in its history, arguing that "values are more important than a party card."

The decision expanded the Compass community to include progressives from across the political spectrum, including Liberal Democrats, Greens, SNP supporters, Plaid Cymru members, and supporters of the then Women's Equality Party.

The Progressive Alliance at the 2017 General Election

Compass played a central organising role in the Progressive Alliance campaign during the snap general election in 2017. Against the backdrop of an increasingly unpopular Brexit process, Compass sought to encourage cooperation between Labour, the Liberal Democrats, the Green Party, Plaid Cymru and the SNP, arguing that collaboration and tactical voting offered the best chance of preventing a Conservative majority. Rather than negotiating formal electoral pacts between national parties, Compass focused on supporting local alliances, coordinating activists, identifying target constituencies, promoting tactical voting, and fostering cooperation across party lines.

The story of this campaign was told by Barry Langford in his book All Together Now. Langford portrays Compass as a catalyst that helped build relationships between progressive campaigners, mobilise volunteers, and shape the wider debate about electoral cooperation. Although the organisation had limited resources and faced scepticism from many people working within the established parties, the book argues that its campaign contributed to the unexpectedly strong performance of progressive parties and demonstrated the potential of alliance politics in the UK's first-past-the-post electoral system.

20th Anniversary (2023)

In 2023, Compass marked its twentieth anniversary with the publication of a pamphlet, Compass at 20 Years: The Journey So Far to a Good Society, chronicling its history of strategising and political action.

In June 2023, it was revealed that the chair of Compass, Neal Lawson, faced possible expulsion from the Labour Party due to allegedly tweeting in support of Green Party candidates in 2021. He ultimately was not expelled.

Support for Andy Burnham

Compass played an important role in Andy Burnham's assent to the role of Prime Minister by inviting him to speak at their annual conference in May 2025. As written in the Guardian: "the third coming of Andy Burnham began in earnest [at] the annual conference of the centre-left pressure group Compass".

== Activities ==
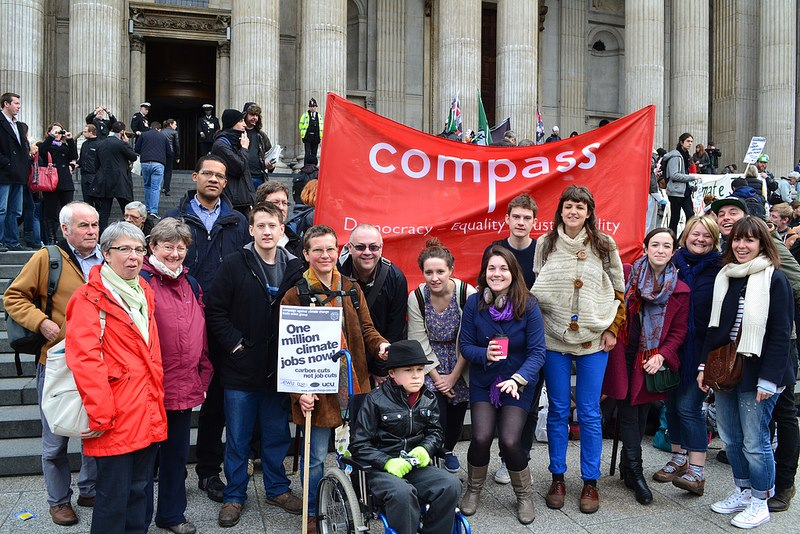
Compass members at an anti-austerity event

Since its inception, Compass has evolved from a centre-left pressure group seeking to influence Labour Party policy into a broader movement advocating democratic reform, pluralist politics, and cooperation across progressive parties and movements. While initially focused on shaping debates within Labour through publications, conferences, and policy development, its activities increasingly expanded to focus on building alliances between political parties, civil society organisations, and grassroots campaigns. This strategic shift also raised Compass' public profile. Its Director, Neal Lawson, is a prominent commentator on the British left, writing regularly for The Guardian and the New Statesman. When he called for Tony Blair to resign in May 2006, it was widely reported elsewhere.

=== Campaigns ===
Compass runs a number of active campaigns in addition to its broader advocacy work.

Historic campaigns include the Progressive Alliance and "Only Stand to Win" (a campaign for a rule change in the Labour Party to allow constituency local parties the ability to vote on whether or not to stand a candidate at general elections).

- Electoral reform – Compass has been a sustained advocate for electoral reform, campaigning to replace the First Past the Post voting system with a form of proportional representation. It argues that democratic renewal — including electoral reform — is a prerequisite for achieving a more equal and sustainable society, describing it as "the key that unlocks" a Good Society. During the 2024 general election, Compass's Win As One campaign mobilised local groups to campaign for parliamentary candidates who supported proportional representation. The campaign endorses 41 candidates, 35 of whom were elected, while also coordinating tactical voting and vote-swapping initiatives to maximise support for electoral reform advocates.
- Public Ownership of Water – Compass campaigns for the return of the water industry to public ownership, arguing that privatisation has failed consumers and the environment. The campaign, branded "Our Water Our Way," contends that public ownership offers a means of uniting economic, democratic, and environmental goals.
- Local and Devolved Elections – Compass has also campaigned around local, Scottish Parliament, and Senedd elections, calling on progressives to work across party lines to defeat far-right candidates, and running local tactical voting campaigns to deliver power to progressive coalitions.
- Basic Income Conversation - From 2020 to 2023, Compass hosted The Basic Income Conversation, a campaign that promoted universal basic income (UBI) in the United Kingdom through research, public engagement and community organising. The initiative began by calling for an emergency basic income in response to the COVID-19 pandemic, circulating a petition that received tens of thousands of signatures. They developed a proposal for basic income pilots in Central Jarrow and East Finchley. Compass also commissioned and published research on the economic, social and public health impacts of UBI, including reports on poverty reduction, feasibility and public opinion. In 2023, the project transferred from Compass to the research organisation Autonomy.
- Wealth Inequality – In 2010, Compass established the High Pay Commission on top pay and inequality, which in turn became the High Pay Centre think tank in 2011.

=== Local Groups ===
Compass Local Groups are regional branches of Compass that support the organisation's grassroots activities across the United Kingdom. They provide forums for local members and supporters to discuss political issues, organise events, campaign on local and national issues, and contribute to Compass's wider programme. Local groups operate independently while adhering to Compass's principles of democracy, equality, sustainability and pluralism.

As of 2026, Compass has active local groups in a number of areas across England, with additional groups being established and support available for members wishing to create new groups in areas without an existing branch. The organisation also facilitates collaboration between local groups through an online network for members.

=== Publications ===
Compass produces a range of pamphlets, reports, and essays on progressive politics. Previous publications include:

- The Temper Trap: How Proportional Representation Tames the Populist-Right by Stuart Donald
- The New Settlement: For a Better Society by Sue Goss
- After the Riots by Neal Lawson
- We Divide, They Conquer: If Labour struggles to win alone, what is to be done? by Grace Barnett and Neal Lawson
- Thin Ice: Why the UK’s progressive majority could stop Labour’s landslide melting away by Matthew Sowemimo, Neal Lawson and Lena Swedlow

The Compass website also houses opinion pieces about progressive politics, written by a wide range of authors with an invitation for responses from readers.

=== Podcast ===
Compass produces a podcast, It's Bloody Complicated, featuring interviews and discussions with progressive thinkers, politicians, and campaigners. Compass members are invited to join the live podcast recording and ask the guests questions. The podcast is also uploaded as a recorded series.

=== Events ===
Compass organises an annual conference to bring together its members and allies. The event on 17 June 2006 included many figures identified with Labour and the trade union movement, such as Ed Balls, Neal Lawson, Derek Simpson, Hilary Benn, Fiona Millar, John Harris, Hazel Blears, Kevin Maguire, and Ed Miliband. There were calls for, amongst other things, the abolition of the monarchy and the destruction of nuclear weapons, put forward by the membership. In 2006 it merged with the Catalyst think tank.

The 2007 Robin Cook Memorial Conference "Shaping Our Global World" included speakers such as Ken Livingstone, Dave Prentis, Frances O'Grady, Jon Cruddas and Helena Kennedy as well as panels and seminars organised by groups such as Unison, Friends of the Earth, War on Want, Liberty, the Fabian Society and the Citizen Organising Foundation.

In May 2025, Compass held a conference titled "Change:HOW? A Decade of Radical Renewal", where they invited Andy Burnham to speak. This conference was credited as giving Andy Burnham the platform that paved the way for him to become Prime Minister; the Guardian called the event the beginning of the "third coming of Andy Burnham."

In May 2026, the conference was titled "Change:NOW! Mobilising the Progressive Majority"; over 800 people attended.

== Governing structure ==
Compass holds an Annual General Meeting, open to all members, at which the constitution, policy and strategy of the organisation can be debated and amended.

Compass is managed by a Board, ratified at the Annual General Meeting. The Board provide strategic direction for Compass and makes decisions on behalf of the membership. The Board approximately five times a year.

Day-to-day operations are led by a small team of staff. As of 2026, the organisation's Director is Neal Lawson, who has led Compass since its founding in 2003. He oversees strategy, relationships, and funding.

== Funding ==
The funding transparency website Who Funds You? has awarded Compass an A grade for several years, the highest transparency rating (rating goes from A to E).

The organisation is registered as a not-for-profit company limited by guarantee and relies on membership subscriptions and donations to fund its activities.

== Mainstream Labour ==
In September 2025, Compass and soft-left group Open Labour launched a network, Mainstream Labour.

== See also ==
- Breakfast Club (British politics)
- Clause Four Group
- Labour Co-ordinating Committee
- Labour Representation Committee (2004)
- Labour Solidarity Campaign
- The Manifesto Group
- Momentum (organisation)
