= Neal Lawson =

British political writer and lobbyist

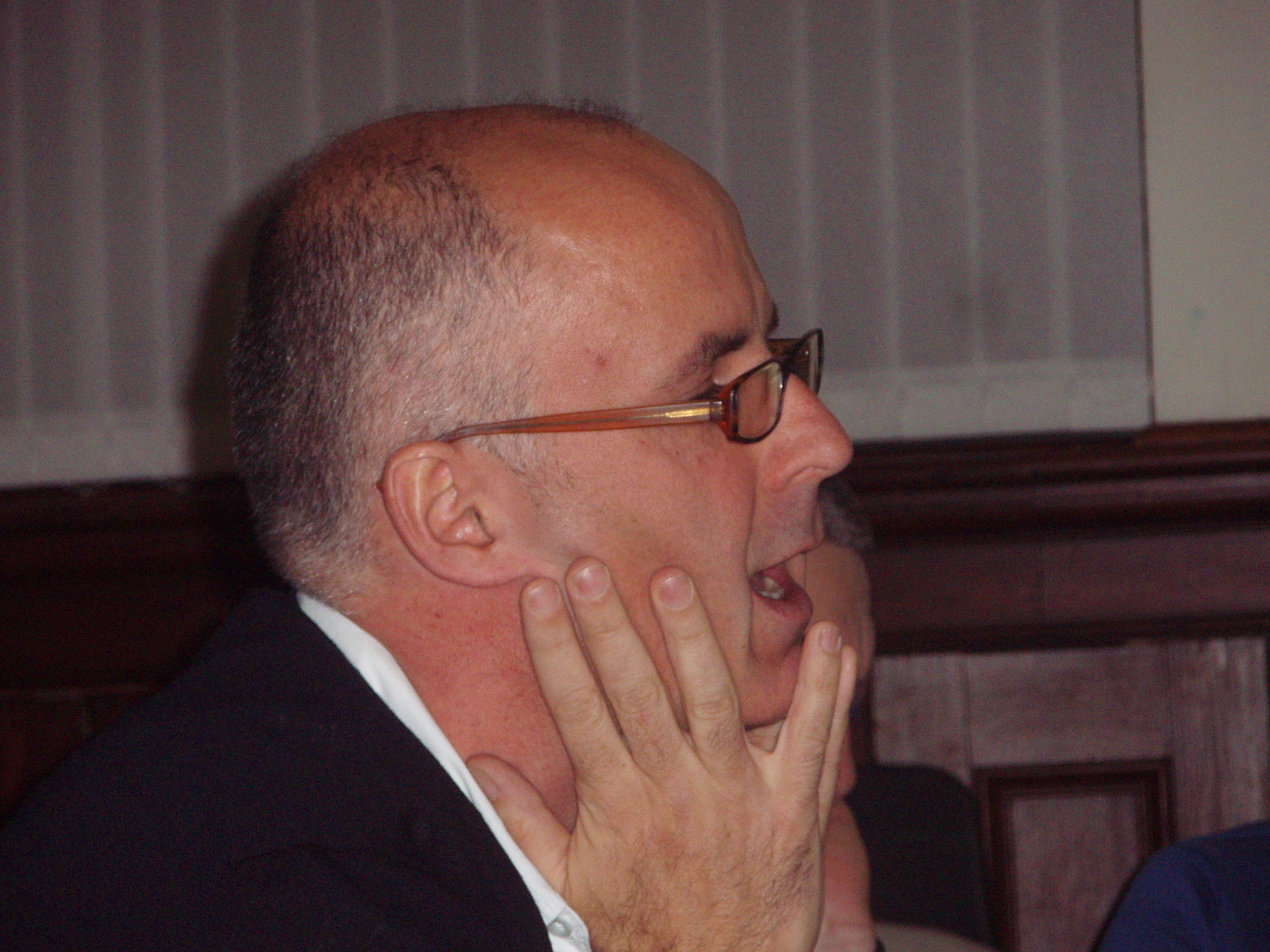
- Born: March 1963 (age 63); Kent, England, UK
- Education: Nottingham Polytechnic (BA)
- Employers: Transport and General Workers' Union (1980s); Labour Party (1992–1994); Lowe Bell (1990s); LLM Communications (1997–2004); Compass (2003–)
- Title: Chair of Compass
- Term: 2003–
- Political party: Labour

Neal Derek Lawson (born March 1963) is a British political commentator, consultant, lobbyist and organiser. He is the co-founder and chair of the Labour Party-affiliated centre-left pressure group Compass.

== Biography ==
Lawson was born in and brought up in Bexleyheath, Kent. He became interested in politics through his father, a printer in Fleet Street, and joined the Labour Party at 16. After attending Gravel Hill Primary School, BETHS Secondary School and Bexley College, he graduated from the Nottingham Polytechnic. He then worked as a researcher for the Transport and General Workers' Union in Bristol and, in the mid to late 1980s, wrote speeches for Gordon Brown. He was an adviser to Brown as Shadow Chancellor of the Exchequer from 1992 to 1994. In 1992, he founded Renewal, the policy journal of the Labour Coordinating Committee published since 1993.

He then went to work for Lord Bell at Lowe Bell Political as a lobbyist. In May 1996, he joined David Halpern in co-founding Nexus, described by Tony Blair as the first virtual think tank and affiliated to the Labour Party; its inaugural seminar was sponsored by Deloitte and Touche Consulting Group and addressed by Blair, while its March 1997 conference at the London School of Economics on "Passing the Torch", welcomed by Anthony Giddens, referenced New Labour's expected takeover from the New Right.

Lawson advised Blair on strategy during the 1997 general election campaign at the Labour Party's new media headquarters in the Millbank Tower. In January 1997, he co-organised a dinner meeting between Labour and the Liberal Democrats at the Goring Hotel in London, where Tony Blair and the Liberal Democrats leader Paddy Ashdown struck a covert electoral deal.

Following the May 1997 election victory, Lawson co-founded a lobbying and public relations company, LLM Communications, with Ben Lucas and Jonathan Mendelsohn, and was appointed its director in August of the same year. In March 1998, he positioned himself on the left of New Labour as a "new social democrat" in an opinion piece written jointly with Simon Buckby (the subsequent campaign director of Britain in Europe). In July 1998, Lawson and his LLM partners were at the centre of the cash-for-ministerial-access scandal known as Lobbygate, after he boasted to the undercover journalist Greg Palast of his relationship with Chancellor of the Exchequer Gordon Brown. Lawson was personally involved in lobbying for the scandal-ridden GTech Corporation and for Anglian Water, which had breached environmental regulations. He wrote listings for the Evening Standard in 1998.

He set up Compass in 2003 together with Tom Bentley, Michael Jacobs and Matthew Taylor, and left LLM in 2004 with a large payout that allowed him to focus full-time on his new work. He has since served as Compass's executive director. Compass describes itself as "a home for those who want to build and be a part of a Good Society; one where equality, sustainability and democracy are not mere aspirations, but a living reality." It has campaigned on issues such as high pay (helping form the High Pay Centre), and against loan sharking. As of 2020, it ran a campaign for Universal Basic Income. At the 2017 general election Compass helped form the Progressive Alliance and continues to work across all progressive parties and movements. Compass adopted a theory of transition to a good society called 45° Change based on a report Lawson wrote in 2019.

In the aftermath of the 2009 parliamentary expenses scandal and during the 2011 Alternative Vote referendum, Lawson co-directed the Vote for a Change campaign on behalf of the Electoral Reform Society along with Jess Asato and Colin Hines. He was a director of Kat Banyard's UK Feminista pressure group from 2010 to 2015.

In January 2013, he published a joint article with a group of Policy Network, Fabian Society and Liberal Left leaders that called on Labour and the Liberal Democrats to open coalition talks for the following election.

He supported Jeremy Corbyn in the 2015 Labour Party leadership election but subsequently explained that he had voted for "the wave of enthusiasm and energy being unleashed around the party for the first time in two decades", while dismissing "Corbynism" as "too crude a project". In September 2016, he criticised Corbyn's leadership of the Labour Party for refusing to support the idea of changing the British voting system to proportional representation and for rejecting "a progressive alliance" with the Green Party and the Scottish National Party; he called on Corbyn to "start trusting people" outside of what he described as "a small tight clique, their backs to the wall against the world". Later that month, he debated the Momentum speakers Jon Lansman and Rhea Wolfson on "Building a progressive majority" alongside Caroline Lucas of the Green Party at the inaugural The World Transformed festival, organised by Momentum as a side event at the Labour Party Conference in Liverpool – against the background of an internal challenge to Corbyn over proportional representation and "progressive alliance", led by Clive Lewis. In May 2017, he spoke at the "Building a Progressive Future" launch event for the Progressive Alliance in London.

In June 2023, Lawson received notice that he may face expulsion from the Labour Party – after 44 years of membership – because of a May 2021 retweet supporting tactical voting during the local elections in Oxford West and Abingdon as part of his long-standing advocacy for a united progressive front with the Green Party and the Liberal Democrats. Lawson described the Labour Party as a "bully" and accused it of pursuing a "bureaucratic project" instead of a "deep intellectual cultural project".

Lawson is a part-time consultant at progressive communicators Jericho Chambers, where he works on a global responsible tax project. He is on the Board of the Citizens Basic Income Trust and is a Commissioner on the Women's Budget Group Commission on a Gender Equal Economy.

== Media activity and publications ==
He writes for The Guardian, the New Statesman and OpenDemocracy about equality, democracy and the future of the left, and appears on TV and radio as a political commentator. He is the author of All Consuming, a book published with Penguin in 2009, which analyses the social cost of consumerism. Lawson has credited the Polish Marxist sociologist Zygmunt Bauman and the political scientist David Marquand (in particular Marquand's book The Unprincipled Society, written as a member of the Social Democratic Party in 1988) as the key influences on his political thought.

Lawson is the managing editor of the quarterly progressive policy journal Renewal. Renewal was previously the journal of the Labour Coordinating Committee, which was wound up in 1998 and briefly replaced by the Labour Renewal Network. He co-edited The Progressive Century (Palgrave, 2001).

== Reception ==
Lawson has been described by Zygmunt Bauman as “one of the most insightful and inventive minds on the British political stage”, in The Guardian as “the most optimistic commentator in western Europe” and as "new Labour's Eeyore" in the Sunday Times.
