= Geoff Mulgan =

British political advisor

Sir Geoff Mulgan CBE
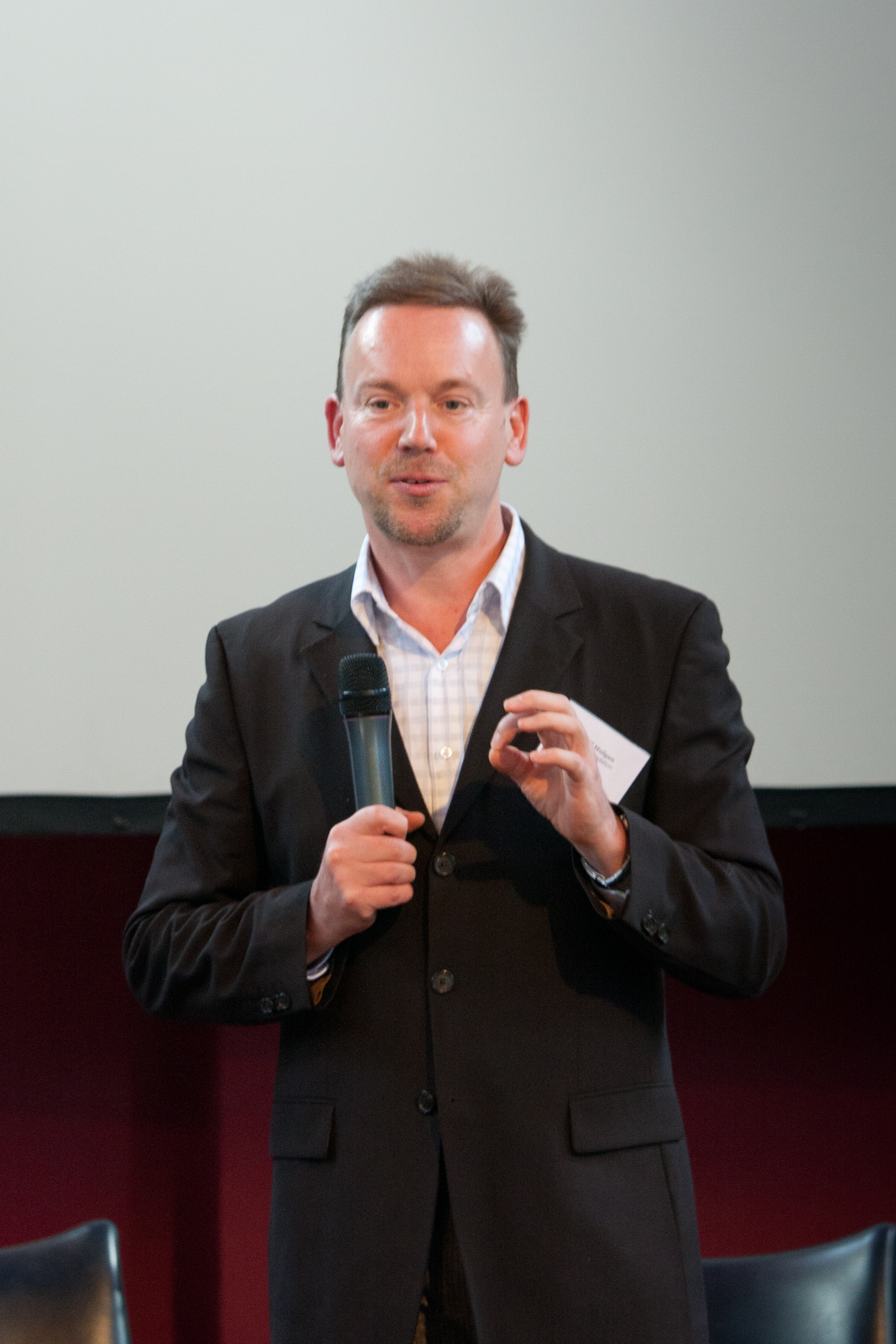
- Mulgan on 24 May 2011
- Born: Geoffrey John Mulgan; 1961 (age 64–65)
- Education: Balliol College, Oxford, University of Westminster
- Employer(s): BBC, NESTA
- Political party: Labour Party
- Children: Two

Sir Geoffrey John Mulgan CBE (born 1961) is Professor of Collective Intelligence, Public Policy and Social Innovation at University College London (UCL). From 2011 to 2019 he was chief executive of the National Endowment for Science Technology and the Arts (NESTA) and visiting professor at University College London, the London School of Economics, and the University of Melbourne.

== Education ==
Mulgan obtained a first-class degree from Balliol College, Oxford and a PhD in telecommunications from the University of Westminster. He was also a fellow at the Massachusetts Institute of Technology, and trained as a Buddhist monk in Sri Lanka.

== Career ==
Mulgan worked for a spell in the 1980s as a van driver for the "Labour-supporting collective of musicians and comedians known as Red Wedge", opting ultimately for a career in local government and academia in the UK as well as writing on social and political issues in various newspapers and magazines in the 1990s, including The Independent, the Financial Times, The Guardian, and the New Statesman. He also worked as a reporter for BBC television and radio.

In January 2020, he was appointed as Professor of Collective Intelligence, Public Policy and Social Innovation at University College London, to lead research into collective intelligence. Also in 2020, he joined the Nordic think tank Demos Helsinki as a fellow.

Earlier roles include:

- Chief executive of Nesta, an innovation foundation (2011 to 2019). He led the organisation's transition from the public sector to an independent charitable foundation.
- CEO of the Young Foundation, based in London (until 2011)
- Director of the Prime Minister's Strategy Unit (and before that Director of the Performance and Innovation Unit)
- Director of Policy at 10 Downing Street under prime minister Tony Blair
- Co-founder and director of the London-based think tank Demos (from 1993 to 1998)
- Chief adviser to Gordon Brown MP in the early 1990s

He has founded or co-founded many organisations, including: Demos, the Young Foundation, the Social Innovation Exchange (SIX), Uprising, Studio Schools Trust, Action for Happiness, the Alliance for Useful Evidence, States of Change, The Australian Centre for Social Innovation, Maslaha and Nesta Italia. He is a founding editor-in-chief of the journal Collective Intelligence, published by Sage and ACM.

He has been chair of various organisations including the Social Innovation Exchange; Involve; Nesta Italia; and the Studio Schools Trust. He was co-chair of the London LEP Digital, Science, Technology and Arts group under then London Mayor Boris Johnson. He has been a board member of Big Society Capital and a trustee of charities including Action for Happiness; the Photographers' Gallery; Reimagine Europa; Luton Culture Trust; the Design Council, the Work Foundation, Crime Concern, and Political Quarterly, and a member of various committees for bodies including the European Commission, World Economic Forum, OECD, SITRA and the Academy of Medical Sciences. He has served on many advisory committees, including for Cambridge University.

In 2007–2008 Mulgan was an Adelaide Thinker in Residence, advising South Australian Premier Mike Rann on social innovation and social inclusion policies. As a result of Mulgan's recommendations, the Rann Government established The Australian Centre for Social Innovation. From 2016 to 2019, Mulgan was a senior visiting scholar at the Ash Center in the Kennedy School at Harvard University. From 2019 to 2022 he was a World Economic Forum Schwab Fellow.

Mulgan is profiled in two books: The New Alchemists (1999, by Charles Handy), and Visionaries (2001, by Jay Walljasper). He was profiled by the Daily Telegraph in January 2024, prompted by evidence that when in government he had tried to cancel the Horizon Post Office software which later caused a series of miscarriages of justice and a major scandal.

== Works ==
Mulgan has written a number of books, including Communication and Control: Networks and the New Economies of Communication (1991), Politics in an Anti-Political Age (1994), Connexity (1997), Good and Bad Power: the Ideals and Betrayals of Government (Penguin, 2006), The Art of Public Strategy (2009), The Locust and the Bee (Princeton, 2013), Big Mind: how collective intelligence can change our world (Princeton, 2017); Social innovation: how societies find the power to change (Policy Press, 2019); Another World is Possible: how to reignite social and political imagination (Hurst/Oxford University Press, 2022); and When Science Meets Power' (Polity Press, 2024). His books have been translated into many languages. His academic citations number around 25,000 and he has an H-Index of 53.

He has written numerous reports and pamphlets for Demos, the Young Foundation, Nesta, and Demos Helsinki. He has lectured and advised several governments on policy and strategy, and given TED talks on the global economy, education, and happiness.

== Honours and awards ==
Mulgan was made a Commander of the Order of the British Empire (CBE) in the 2004 Birthday Honours for his work at the Prime Minister's Office. He was knighted in the 2020 Birthday Honours for services to the creative economy.

In 2010, he was awarded an honorary degree of Doctor of Social Science by Nottingham Trent University. He was awarded an honorary fellowship by Cardiff University in 2022.
