= Breakfast Club =

Breakfast Club or The Breakfast Club may refer to:

- The Breakfast Club, a 1985 American film
- The Breakfast Club (radio show), an American radio show
- Don McNeill's Breakfast Club, an American radio show 1933–1968
- Breakfast Club (band), an American music group
- Breakfast Club (British politics), a 2015 group
- School breakfast club, a provision for children to eat a healthy breakfast in a safe environment before their first class
- Purdue Breakfast Club, a tradition that occurs before the Purdue University Grand Prix and home football games
