= Greg Marsh =

British entrepreneur and academic

Greg Marsh is a British entrepreneur and academic. He is the founder and CEO of Nous, a financial technology company that claims to use artificial intelligence to help households save money on bills. He previously founded the luxury accommodation marketplace onefinestay and has served as a commentator on personal finance and entrepreneurship.

== Early life ==
Marsh was born in London and read English and philosophy at Christ's College, Cambridge. He later attended Harvard Business School on a Fulbright Scholarship, where he was twice named a Ford Scholar. Marsh is the grandson of Amnesty International founder Peter Benenson, and great-grandson of campaigner Flora Solomon.

== Career ==
=== Early career ===
Marsh began his career at Index Ventures, a European venture capital firm.

In 2010, he founded onefinestay, a luxury home rental marketplace that allowed travelers to stay in high-end private homes with hotel-style service. The company was acquired by Accor in 2016 for a reported US$170 million (£117 million).

Following the acquisition, Marsh served on the Taylor Review of Modern Working Practices, commissioned by then-Prime Minister Theresa May. He later joined the faculty of Harvard Business School, where he taught entrepreneurship, and was elected to the international board of Amnesty International. He is also a visiting professor at Imperial College Business School.

=== Nous ===
In 2021, Marsh co-founded Nous, a financial technology company that uses artificial intelligence to help UK households manage and save money on bills. In February 2022, Nous announced a £6.6 million (US$9 million) seed funding round.

In 2023, Nous launched the first beta version of its AI-powered money-saving agent and became a certified B Corporation. The company exited beta in early 2024. In April 2024, Nous was featured on BBC Morning Live as one of the UK’s best money-saving apps.

=== Media commentary ===
Marsh is a regular commentator on consumer finance and entrepreneurship, appearing on Sky News, ITV, and LBC. He has written or contributed to British media outlets on topics including the cost-of-living crisis, household finances and entrepreneurship.
