= Liberal Left (UK) =

Liberal Left is an organised political faction within the British Liberal Democrats which opposed the party's participation in the 2010–2015 coalition with the Conservative Party.

== Organisational history ==
=== Establishment ===
The establishment of "Liberal Left" was announced in February 2012. According to the organisation's head, Linda Jack, the Liberal Left faction was created as an internal pressure group for the influence of government policy.

Writing in The Guardian, Jack stated that

"We are seeking to organise opinion that is currently angry but uncoordinated, and unable to make its voice heard as strongly as is necessary.

"We see ourselves as a pressure group that shares the objectives of the majority of our party, but believes we need to go further in two areas. The first of these is challenging the leadership position on economic and fiscal policy. The second is building good relations across the left between Liberal Democrats, Labour, the Greens and the non-party liberal left."

Jack noted that the Liberal Left faction emerged due to dismay of Liberal Democrat activists "at just how far our leadership seems to have snuggled up, particularly on policies that fly in the face of our manifesto and our values."

In its founding statement, the Liberal Left upbraided Liberal Democrats party leader Nick Clegg for shifting the party to the right and making it "part of a Government which is Eurosceptic, neoliberal and socially conservative." The statement further called for "overt and public dialogue" between the Liberal Democrats, Labour, Greens, and non-party individuals of the left.

=== Connection with Labour ===
Liberal Left has been identified by Liberal Democratic politician Gareth Epps as being centred on party activists close to the progressive pressure group Compass, a coalition based in the Labour Party but also containing members affiliated with the Liberal Democrats and Greens.

In a statement issued shortly after the establishment of the Liberal Left group, chair of Compass Neal Lawson welcomed the formation of the new Liberal Democratic faction, declaring to a Labour Party readership that

"Anything that challenges the Centre-right voting block of the Coalition is clearly a good thing. Anything that helps develop centre-left relationships as an alternative now, tomorrow or in the future to a Conservative led government is to be welcomed. With Labour currently struggling to maintain a healthy poll lead it would be stupid not to look for political partners outside of Labour’s ranks."

Lawson noted that many were put off by sometimes conservative policies and a lack of internal democracy inside the Labour Party and observed the "different but complimentary traditions can make us stronger."

=== Founding conference ===
While Liberal Left was launched as an organised faction in February 2012, an event much remarked about in the national press, the group's formal institutional establishment was slated to be held in conjunction with the Spring Conference of the twice-yearly Liberal Democrat Federal Conference, to be held 10 March 2012 at Gateshead, England.

== Key figures ==
The party's Executive Committee at the time of its formation consisted of :

- Chair: Linda Jack
- Vice-Chair (Strategy): Ron Beadle
- Vice-Chair (Membership): Ruth Bright
- Vice-Chair (Policy): Richard Grayson
- Publications Editor: Jo Ingold
- Treasurer: Stephen Knight
- External Liaison: Simon Hebditch
