= Labour First =

British political organisation

- Formation: 1980, refounded 1988
- Founder: John Spellar
- Legal status: Company limited by guarantee
- Purpose: Political
- Secretary: Luke Akehurst
- Website: labourfirst.org

Labour First is a British political organisation associated with the Labour Party. It was originally founded in 1980 but refounded in 1988. Born out of the political right wing of the Labour Party's struggles with its left wing, it sees itself as protecting the tradition of the "old Labour right". It has been described externally as "the voice of the party’s traditional right" and "a group on the right of the party". It organises petitions, endorses likeminded candidates, and runs events.

== History ==
The original Labour First formed in 1980 as a grouping of Members of Parliament (MPs) on the right of the Labour Party who, while politically aligned with fellow Labour right faction, The Manifesto Group, desired a more collegiate party and thought that the left-right factional battles of the 1970s and 1980s were damaging the party's electoral prospects. The group's chair was Brynmor John and its secretary was Edmund Marshall. By 1983, the grouping had effectively merged into the Labour Solidarity Campaign, the successor to The Manifesto Group.

In late 1987, the Labour Solidarity Campaign was in the process of winding itself up, believing that it had won its fight against the Labour left. A core of Labour Solidarity activists centred around John Spellar argued that there was a need to continue to organise. With Brynmor John's permission, they continued under the Labour First name, founding the current incarnation of Labour First.

== Aims and views ==
Labour First aims to counter the left wing of the Labour Party, ensuring that what they define as "moderate" voices are heard, which they believe will ensure Labour remains as electable as possible in the Westminster system. It calls these aims "Clause One Socialism", after Clause One of the Labour Party constitution, which sets the Labour Party's aims as maintaining a Labour Party in the Parliament of the United Kingdom.

Labour First represents pro-NATO, pro-United States, pro-nuclear weapon, and pro-European Union (EU) stances in the party.

== Structure and activities ==
Labour First is a network of freely associating Labour Party members who share their personal contact details with the organisation. It maintains a network of volunteer local organisers. In 2016, the Birmingham Mail identified MPs John Spellar, Tom Watson, and Ian Austin as having links with Labour First, and reported it as describing itself as "a network of Labour moderates fighting against Momentum and other Hard Left groups to keep Labour as a broad-based and electable party". MP Khalid Mahmood has also attended Labour First events.

Its secretary is Luke Akehurst, the Labour MP for North Durham, and its chair is Keith Dibble, a Labour councillor and cabinet member on Rushmoor Council in Hampshire. In 2017, Labour First employed its first full-time national organiser. In 2019, a digital organiser was also employed. It organises petitions, endorses "moderate" candidates in Labour Party elections, and runs a series of meet-ups and events both at Labour Party conference and in the country at large.

=== Labour First Parliamentary Network ===
The Labour First Parliamentary Network is a parliamentary caucus open to Labour MPs who share the politics of Labour First. It was founded after the 2024 general election by Luke Akehurst and its convener Gurinder Singh Josan as a competitor to the left-wing Socialist Campaign Group. In a joint statement, Akehurst, Josan, John Spellar and Ruth Smeeth invited Labour MPs to join the group, stating that it took several years of "hard graft" to win the party back from those on the left, who they warned were "still waiting in the wings to take advantage of any discord within the party". The group has been described as "pro-Starmer" and is led by Josan, Akehurst, Smeeth and Spellar, with over 50 members as of February 2025.

== Links with Progress ==
Historically, Labour First had little connection with Progress (since 2021 Progressive Britain), a more recent Labour party factional organisation on the right of the Labour party, originally associated with New Labour. The rise of Jeremy Corbyn and Momentum in the Labour Party saw Progress and Labour First, while remaining distinct organisations with different traditions, carry out more joint activities, including joint endorsement of candidates in internal party elections. During the 2020 Labour Party leadership election, Labour First formed a joint venture with Progress called Reclaiming Labour, holding meetings around the country analysing why Labour lost heavily in the 2019 United Kingdom general election.

In April 2020, immediately on the election of Keir Starmer as party leader, Labour First and Progress launched jointly a new umbrella organisation called Labour to Win, with goals including "to bring about fundamental change in the party's culture and organisation". Labour to Win endorsed candidates in the 2020 Labour National Executive Committee (NEC) elections; owing to the newly adopted single transferable vote nature of the elections and in the spirit of electing a pluralistic NEC, the organisation chose only to endorse six of its own candidates and also to endorse three candidates politically more to the left than Labour to Win but who had a commitment to broad church Labour politics.
