= Renewal (magazine) =

British left-wing political magazine

- Editor: David Klemperer, Morgan Jones, Lise Butler, Jack Jeffrey
- Former editors: Neal Lawson, Paul Thompson, Martin McIvor, Ben Jackson, James Stafford, Florence Sutcliffe-Braithwaite, Emily Robinson, George Morris, Craig Berry, Nick Garland, Eunice Goes, Karl Pike
- Categories: Politics
- Frequency: Quarterly
- Publisher: Compass
- Founded: 1993; 33 years ago
- Country: United Kingdom
- Based in: London
- Language: English
- Website: www.renewal.org.uk
- ISSN: 0968-252X
- OCLC: 813292830

Renewal is a quarterly British left-wing political magazine published by Lawrence and Wishart.

== History ==
Renewal was established in 1993 as the magazine of the Labour Coordinating Committee in the wake of the Labour Party's fourth successive election defeat. Under the editorship of Neal Lawson and Paul Thompson, it established itself as an influential forum for debate among Labour Party "modernisers". Over time its editors took an increasingly critical approach towards Tony Blair's leadership of the Labour Party and were instrumental in the foundation of the pressure group Compass.

In 2007, Martin McIvor took over as editor. In 2012, Ben Jackson took over as editor. In 2016, the historians Florence Sutcliffe-Braithwaite and James Stafford took over as editors, and were subsequently joined by Emily Robinson and George Morris. In 2023, they were succeeded by Craig Berry, Nick Garland, Eunice Goes and Karl Pike. In 2025, the journal moved publishers, from Lawrence & Wishart to the think tank Compass, with a new editorial team of David Klemperer, Morgan Jones, Jack Jeffries, and Lise Butler. In the early-mid 2010s, the journal carried articles from such authors as Lord Stewart Wood, Lisa Nandy MP, and Rachel Reeves and Martin McIvor, and interviews with Frances O'Grady, and Thomas Piketty. In May 2026, a special issue of the journal carrying articles on economic policy by members of the Tribune Group of the Parliamentary Labour Party, including Louise Haigh and Yuan Yang, received considerable media attention for setting out a potential alternative economic programme for the incumbent Labour government.
