= Sane Seven =

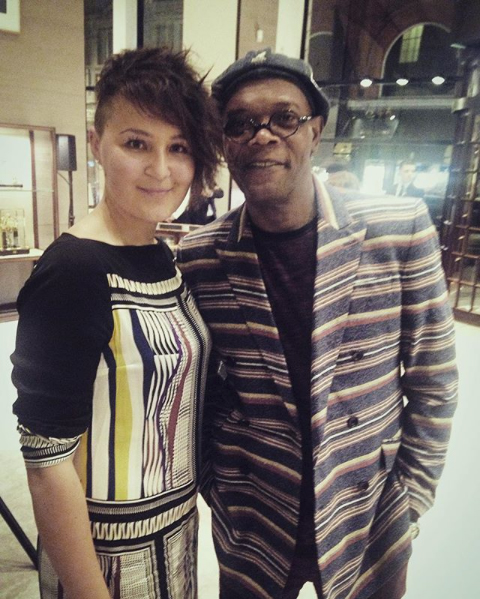
- Sane Seven with Samuel Jackson at Asprey charity event
- Born: Viktorija Grigorjevaite
- Education: BA Sociology, Vytauto Didziojo Universitetas; Photography, The City of Liverpool College; Fine Art, Liverpool John Moores University
- Occupations: Photographer, visual artist
- Partner: Marius Janciauskas
- Website: www.saneseven.com

Sane Seven is a portrait photographer based in the United Kingdom, renowned for her intimate depictions of influential women and her focus on projects advancing gender equality. She works in tandem with her feminist husband and creative director Marius Janciauskas.

== Career ==
Seven's journey in photography began with her studies in Fine Art at John Moores University, where she later became a visiting lecturer. Her early career saw her as Creative Director at The Collective magazine and a Board Member of Trustees at The Merseyside Youth Association.

Seven's partnership with Marius Janciauskas, who holds a PhD in Psychology, began in 2014. This collaboration has been instrumental in shaping their unique approach to portrait photography, blending artistic vision with research-based insight.

In 2016, the duo held an exhibition during the International Festival for Business, featuring unconventional portraits of business leaders and entrepreneurs. In 2017, they published "Secrets of Success: None of Us Are Superman," a book aimed at inspiring young entrepreneurs, which won a silver prize at the MIFA awards.

== Collaborations ==
2024

- Collaborated with MAG International to photograph women deminers in Iraq, breaking stereotypes about women in male-dominated fields. The story was published in The Sunday Times and The Times.
- Partnered with The Independent and Refuge charity on a campaign against domestic violence, featuring portraits of influential British women.
- Initiated the "40 over 40" campaign addressing age-based sexism, launching with The Female Lead as the #PrimeTime campaign at Amazon Headquarters.
- Selected by Oxfam to support their annual Second-Hand September campaign.

2023

- Collaborated with Paralympian athlete Stefanie Reid on an image challenging perceptions of disability.

2022

- Worked with Make 2nds Count charity to raise awareness about Secondary Breast Cancer.

2021

- Collaborated with The Female Lead to publish "The Female Lead Vol 2: We Rise by Lifting Others," featuring 67 women role models.

== Notable Photographs ==
She has photographed a wide range of influential women leaders, including:

- Julia Gillard, former Prime Minister of Australia
- Helena Bonham Carter, actress and cultural icon
- Shonda Rhimes, producer and creator of Bridgerton
- Dame Donna Langley, Chairperson of Universal Pictures
- Lady Nicola Mendelsohn, Head of The Global Business Group for Meta
- Lady Brenda Hale, former President of the Supreme Court of the United Kingdom
- General Dame Sharon Nesmith, Vice Chief of the Defence Staff

== Awards ==
- MIFA Award for Advertising Photographer of the Year, 2017
- New York Photography Awards 2021
- Portrait of Humanity 2023
- London Photography Awards 2023

== Exhibitions ==
- Independent Women: The Influence List 2024. Outernet. London, UK
- Portrait of Humanity Exhibition, 2023. Belfast, UK
- International Festival for Business, 2016, Liverpool, UK
