= Jon Mendelsohn =

British lobbyist and politician (born 1966)

The Right Honourable The Lord Mendelsohn

Member of the House of Lords
- Lord Temporal
- Life peerage 5 September 2013

Personal details
- Born: Jonathan Neil Mendelsohn; 30 December 1966 (age 59)
- Spouse: Nicola Clyne
- Children: 4
- Occupation: Lobbyist, spokesman

Jonathan Neil Mendelsohn, Baron Mendelsohn (born 30 December 1966), best known as Jon Mendelsohn, is a British lobbyist and Labour political organiser. He was appointed the Director of General Election Resources for the party in 2007.

Mendelsohn is a life peer member of the House of Lords and chairman of 888 Holdings, a gambling company.

== "Lobbygate" ==
With Neal Lawson and Ben Lucas, he founded LLM Communications in 1997, a lobbying firm with easy access to the new Labour Government. He has been a spokesman and lobbyist for the gambling company PartyGaming.

In 1998, he was caught on tape along with Derek Draper boasting to Greg Palast, an undercover reporter posing as a businessman, about how they could sell access to government ministers and create tax breaks for their clients in a scandal that was dubbed "Lobbygate". Draper denied the allegations.

In the same incident Mendelsohn was approached by an undercover journalist posing as a representative of American energy companies who were seeking to ignore environmental laws. Despite LLM's claim that "we believe that there will be a new breed of 'ethical winners' who will demonstrate that businesses no longer operate in a moral vacuum", Mendelsohn went on to advise the reporter to rephrase their plans into language that sounded "Earth-Friendly" going on to say "Tony [Blair] is very anxious to be seen as green. Everything has to be couched in environmental language – even if it's slightly Orwellian."

In 2007, then a fundraiser for Gordon Brown, he wrote to controversial Labour donor David Abrahams, describing Abrahams as one of Labour's "strongest supporters", at the height of a scandal over falsely declared donations.

== Other activities ==
He donated money to Peter Hain's 2007 deputy leadership campaign. According to The Daily Telegraph, "Mr Mendelsohn is steeped in the north London Jewish community", and is a former chairman of Labour Friends of Israel.

== House of Lords ==
On 5 September 2013 he was created a life peer as Baron Mendelsohn, of Finchley in the London Borough of Barnet. He became Labour's business and international trade spokesman in the House of Lords.

In January 2018 he was asked to "step down" from this front bench role, in the wake of the Presidents Club dinner earlier that month, where several women were subjected to sexual harassment and groping. He attended the dinner as President of a charity which received support from the event. According to a party statement, he "did not witness any of the appalling incidents described in reports and has unreservedly condemned such behaviour".

== Personal life ==
He is married with four children. His wife Nicola, née Clyne, now Lady Mendelsohn, was appointed Facebook's vice-president for Europe, the Middle East and Africa in May 2013. She was formerly chairman of the advertising agency Karmarama, deputy chairman of the advertising agency Grey London and past President of the Institute of Practitioners in Advertising.

Orders of precedence in the United Kingdom
Preceded by The Lord King of Lothbury	Gentlemen; Baron Mendelsohn	Followed by The Lord Wrigglesworth
