= Paul Thompson (sociologist) =

British sociologist (born 1951)

- Born: 1 January 1951 (age 75)
- Occupation: Sociologist

Academic background
- Education: University of Liverpool

Academic work
- Institutions: University of Stirling

Paul Thompson (born 1 January 1951) is a sociologist of work and organization, most known for his writings on the labour process. His work has been translated into a number of languages, including Japanese, German, Spanish, French, and Swedish. He also writes about British politics and left strategies. He is an Emeritus Professor of Employment Studies at the University of Stirling, UK, and is the Convener of the International Labour Process Conference (ILPC).

== Education and academic career ==
Thompson completed his undergraduate degree in sociology and politics at the University of Liverpool in 1972. He then worked in further education while earning a doctorate at the same university in 1981. After publishing his first book, The Nature of Work: An Introduction to Debates on the Labour Process in 1983, he was joined University of Central Lancashire as lecturer. He became a professor in 1988 and, while at Central Lancashire, co-authored Work Organisations with David McHugh. In the early 1990s, he collaborated with colleagues on comparative research projects on the commercial vehicle and international hotel industries.

In 1995, Thompson moved to Scotland to take a chair in the Department of Business Studies at the University of Edinburgh. During his four years there, he led a major research project on the Scottish spirits industry and co-authored Organisational Misbehaviour (1999) with Stephen Ackroyd. In the same year, he joined the University of Strathclyde as a Professor of Organisational Analysis, where he remained for 15 years. His research during this time included studies on call centers with George Callaghan (Open University), supermarket supply chains with Kirsty Newsome and Joanne Commander, and critical perspectives on the knowledge and creative economy with Chris Warhurst (Strathclyde). He also developed research collaborations in Australia, particularly with Rachel Parker on the creative industries and Paula McDonald on social media in employment at the Queensland University of Technology. In 2015, he took a fractional appointment at the University of Stirling's School of Management, acting as Research Impact Director, before retiring in 2020.

== Political career ==
Thompson has been a labour movement activist and political commentator. In the 1970s, he was a member of the revolutionary socialist organization Big Flame, originally founded in Liverpool. His work, The Revolution Unfinished, was a critique of Trotskyism. In 1980, he joined the Labour Party and, in 1983, became a member of the executive of the left pressure group, the Labour Coordinating Committee (LCC), which had diverged from the more traditional left after the 1983 General Election result. He was chair of the organization from 1986 to 1988 and was involved in opposing the Militant Tendency's takeover of the Labour Party in Liverpool. While working at Beijing University in 1989, he supported the pro-democracy uprising that led to the Tiananmen Square massacre.

As the LCC declined, he helped launch Renewal, a journal committed to exploring radical social democratic policies in the British Labour Party and wider left. Thompson co-edited alongside Neal Lawson from 1993 to 2006 and remains on its Editorial Board. Since then, he has contributed political commentary and policy ideas to outlets including Dissent, Political Quarterly and Labour List.

== Work ==
=== Labour process theory ===
Thompson has contributed to articulating and disseminating this perspective, originally linked to Harry Braverman's updating of Karl Marx's analysis of labour in capitalist production. He synthesized its foundational ideas into a 'core theory,' first outlined in 1990 and later expanded in collaboration with Chris Smith. He contributed in developing and internationalizing the network of researchers associated with the ILPC and has served as Convener of its Steering Group. In 2020, the conference launched its own journal, Work in the Global Economy, where he is Consulting Editor.

=== Labour agency ===
Thompson has advocated for the continued relevance of labour agency and dissent, challenging claims of their disappearance or marginalization, particularly from postmodern perspectives. He has made contributions with the concept of misbehavior at work, developed in two editions of Organisational Misbehaviour and various articles with Stephen Ackroyd.

=== Disconnected capitalism ===
Thompson has worked to chart the relations between capitalist political economy and workplace regimes. The concept of disconnected capitalism aimed at explaining how shareholder value business models have undermined stable bargains between employers and workers. He identified the negative impacts of financialization, a thesis first put forward in a 2003 paper and further developed in collaborative work with Jean Cushen.

== Selected publications ==
=== Books ===
- The Nature of Work: An Introduction to Debates on the Labour Process (1983) ISBN 978-0333330265
- Work Organisations (1990) ISBN 978-0333437070
- Organisational Misbehaviour (1999) ISBN 978-1529780833
- The Oxford Handbook of Work and Organization (2005) ISBN 978-0199299249
- Working Life: Renewing Labour Process Analysis (2010) ISBN 978-0230222236

=== Book chapters ===
- Thompson, P. (1990). Crawling from the wreckage: The labour process and the politics of production. In D. Knights & H. Willmott (Eds.), Labour Process Theory (pp. 95–124). Palgrave Macmillan.
- Thompson, P. (1993). Fatal distraction: Postmodernism and organisation theory. In J. Hassard & M. Parker (eds.), Postmodernism and Organisations. Sage.
- Thompson, P., & Vincent, S. (2010). Labour process theory and critical realism. In P. Thompson & C. Smith (eds.), Working life: Renewing Labour Process Analysis (pp. 47–69). Palgrave Macmillan.

=== Journal articles ===
- Thompson, P., & Ackroyd, S. (1995). All quiet on the workplace front? A critique of recent trends in British industrial sociology. Sociology, 29(4), 615-633.
- Thompson, P., & Wallace, T. (1996). Redesigning production through teamworking: Case studies from the Volvo Truck Corporation. International Journal of Operations & Production Management, 16(2), 103-118.
- Thompson, P., Warhurst, C., & Callaghan, G. (2001). Ignorant theory and knowledgeable workers: Interrogating the connections between knowledge, skills and services. Journal of Management Studies, 38(7), 923-942.
- Callaghan, G., & Thompson, P. (2002). ‘We recruit attitude’: the selection and shaping of routine call centre labour. Journal of Management Studies, 39(2), 233-254.
- Thompson, P. (2003). Disconnected capitalism: or why employers can't keep their side of the bargain. Work, Employment and Society, 17(2), 359-378.
- Thompson, P. (2011). The trouble with HRM. Human Resource Management Journal, 21(4), 355-367.
- Thompson, P., Parker, R., & Cox, S. (2016). Interrogating creative theory and creative work: Inside the games studio. Sociology, 50(2), 316-332.
- Cushen, J., & Thompson, P. (2016). Financialization and value: why labour and the labour process still matter. Work, employment and society, 30(2), 352-365.
- Thompson, P., McDonald, P., & O’Connor, P. (2020). Employee dissent on social media and organizational discipline. Human Relations, 73(5), 631-652.
- Thompson, P., & Smith, C. (2024). Labour process theory: in and beyond the core: continuities, challenges, and choices. Work in the Global Economy, 4(2), 145-169.
