= Demos Helsinki =

Finnish think tank

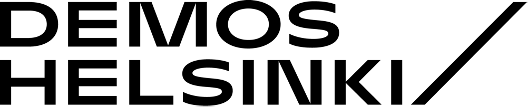
- Formation: 2005; 20 years ago
- Type: Think tank
- Headquarters: Mechelininkatu 3d, 00100
- Location: Helsinki, Finland
- Chief Executive: Juha Leppänen
- Founders: Aleksi Neuvonen, Roope Mokka
- Website: Demoshelsinki.fi

Demos Helsinki is a Finnish think tank. Their main research focus is on governance and societal innovation for the development of a democratic and environmentally sustainable society. The organisation receives a mix of public and private funding. When it was founded in 2005, Demos Helsinki became Finland's first independent think tank, described as a "front-runner" amongst think tanks in the Nordic by the Scandinavian Political Studies journal. Internationally, Demos Helsinki remains one of Finland's most prominent advocates of social change, receiving regular coverage from notable English-language newspapers, including The Guardian, The New York Times, and The Economist.

== History ==
Demos Helsinki was founded in 2005 to conduct research for the Finnish innovation fund Sitra about the future of public services and quality of life in Finland. Demos's approach to research and policy-making combines the expertise from expertise from different fields of study, including urban planning, architecture, and social sciences. In 2007, the organisation launched the largest privately funded climate change campaign in Europe. At their annual conference in 2013, the World Resources Forum crowned Demos Helsinki's ideas for a resource-sustainable economy the best presentation in the Sustainable Business and Industry category. More recently, Demos has developed experimental policy-making approaches for the Finnish government. The universal basic income experiment in Finland in 2016 was part of this experimental policy-making, and Demos received worldwide media attention for their development of the experiment in collaboration with the prime minister's office.

The organisation is also a partner to the city of Helsinki in its environmental and social sustainability programme, aiming to make the city carbon neutral by 2035. Part of this collaboration included the creation of the Think Sustainably app that highlights sustainable consumer options and helps reduce carbon emissions, for which Demos developed the sustainability criteria. Internationally, Demos Helsinki provides the French RATP Group, one of the world's major public transport providers, urban planning advice as a part of their strategy to use design and infrastructure innovation to increase sustainability. Their collaboration is aimed at improving the societal impacts of Paris's public transport infrastructure, whilst decreasing its environmental footprint.

== Notable people ==
This is a list of notable people presently or formerly associated with Demos Helsinki:

- Sari Baldauf - Chairman of Nokia.
- Olli-Pekka Heinonen - Former Finnish Cabinet member (Minister of Transport and Communications, Education)
- Geoff Mulgan - British political scientist and Professor at University College London.
- Aleksi Neuvonen - Finnish futurist and co-founder of Demos Helsinki.
- Roope Mokka - Finnish futures researcher and co-founder of Demos Helsinki.

== See also ==
- List of think tanks
