= Carl Miller (author) =

Author, speaker and researcher

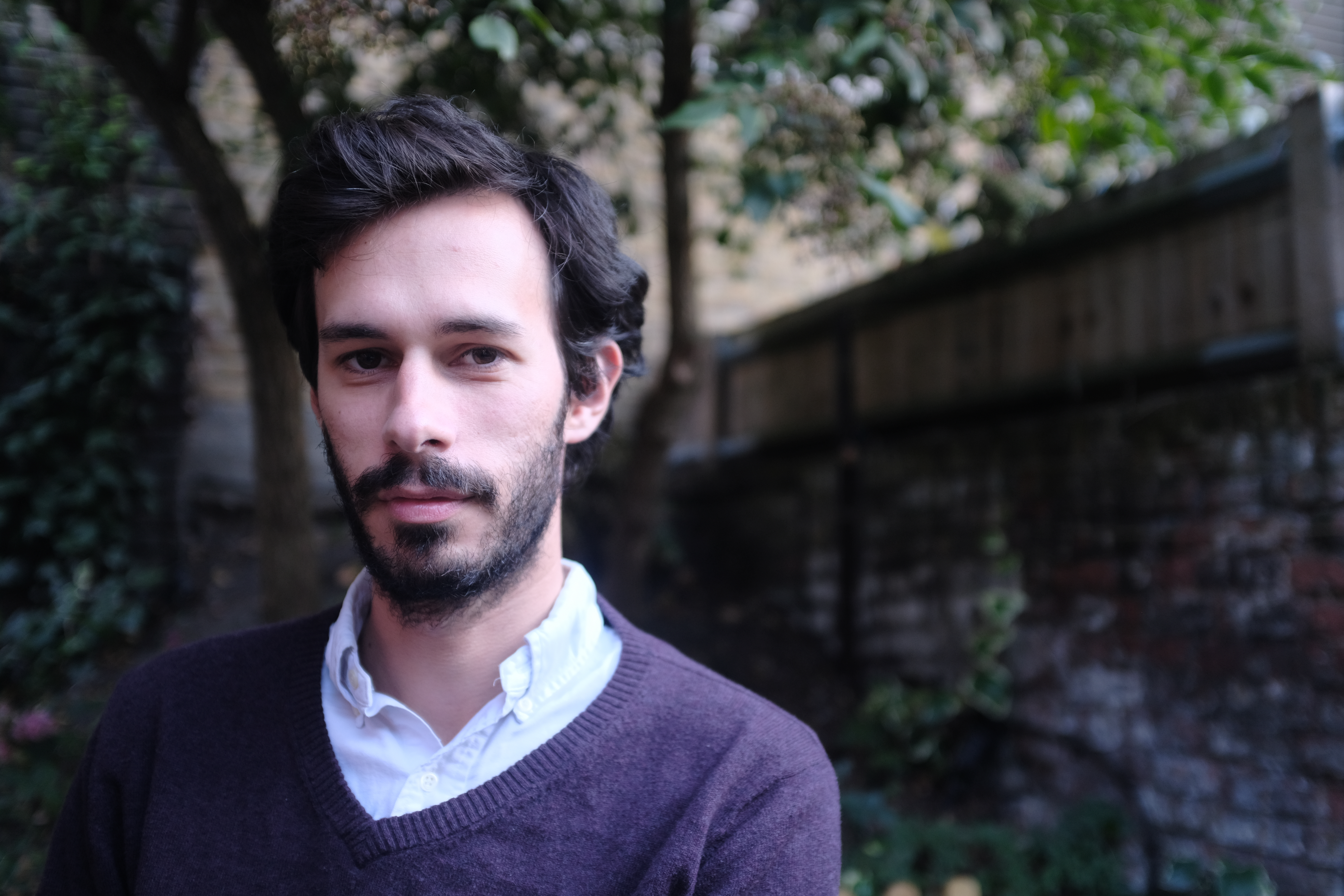
- Carl Miller in 2018
- Born: Carl Jack Miller
- Education: University of Cambridge (BA); King's College London (MA)
- Employer(s): Demos; King's College London
- Known for: Social media intelligence The Death of the Gods: The New Global Power Grab
- Website: carlmiller.co

Carl Jack Miller is an author, speaker and researcher at Demos, a think tank based in London, where he co-founded the Centre for the Analysis of Social Media (CASM) in 2012. As of 2019 Miller is also a visiting scholar and research fellow at King's College, London.

Miller's book, The Death of the Gods: The New Global Power Grab (2018), analyses power in the digital age. His work has also been published and featured in Wired, UnHerd, New Scientist, The Sunday Times, The Daily Telegraph, HuffPost, BBC News, Sky News, the Irish Examiner, The Economist, the Financial Times, The Guardian, and the New Statesman. He is the joint winner of the Transmission Prize 2019 with his fellow researcher Jamie Bartlett.

== Education ==
Miller studied history at the University of Cambridge, graduating in 2008, and war studies at King's College London where he was awarded a Master of Arts (MA) degree in 2009.

== Career and research ==
Miller's research investigates the pitfalls and promises of the Information Age. His interests include politics and technology, cybercrime, war, journalism, the rise of the hackers, the threat of hate speech, the effects of automation and how social and political power is changing.

With David Omand and Jamie Bartlett, Miller coined the term social media intelligence (SOCMINT) in 2012. With Bartlett, Miller is a co-author of Truth, Lies and the Internet, a report on young people's critical thinking online, and The Power of Unreason, an investigation of conspiracy theories, extremism and counter-terrorism.

As of 2019 Miller serves as an expert advisor on social media for the Care Quality Commission (CQC), the external social media expert for the Civil Contingencies Secretariat (CCS) of the Government of the United Kingdom, a member of the Independent Digital Ethics Panel for Policing (IDEPP), and an external advisor on the cross-governmental review on the use of data science within the public sector. Miller is a regular keynote speaker at conferences and has spoken at events and venues such as TEDx in Athens, Thinking Digital, and the Alan Turing Institute in London.

=== The Death of the Gods ===
Miller is the author of the book The Death of the Gods: The New Global Power Grab which analyses power in the digital age. First published in 2018, the book tells the stories of people working in media, technology, warfare, business, politics and crime. Their stories illustrate how technology, particularly the internet and social media, is reshaping power. Miller describes his meetings with:

- a fake news/clickbait merchant in Kosovo
- the Hikikomori in South Korea
- delegates and cypherpunks at the annual DEF CON conference in Las Vegas
- employees of Facebook and Google in Silicon Valley
- soldiers of the 77th Brigade in the British Army working in information warfare and psychological warfare.
- members of the Defence and Security Media Advisory Committee (DSMA)
- founders of the Tech Model Railroad Club (TMRC) at the Massachusetts Institute of Technology (MIT)

As well as these vignettes, the book includes discussions of the work of Audrey Tang also Eliot Higgins of Bellingcat which illustrate the changing nature of power in the 21st century, from both a dystopian and utopian viewpoint.

=== Kill List (2024) ===
Kill List, 18-part podcast series, was released in 2024, detailing a 5-year long investigation into a murder-for-hire website on the dark web. Carl and colleagues gained access to the inside of the website, allowing them to intercept the orders being placed. It resulted in 175 kill orders being disclosed to the police, with 28 convictions and over 150 years of prison time sentenced.

The series reached #1 Apple Podcast charts in Australia, the UK, Canada, the US and New Zealand. Often the discovery was that the kill orders were the result of gendered violence and coercive control. It was described as "the best of its kind since Serial's first series". In December 2024 The Guardian named Kill List #1 in its top 20 podcasts of the year. It also won Best Podcast at the Broadcasting Press Guild Awards in 2025.

== Awards ==
- The Best Podcast of 2024 by the Guardian
- Best Podcast (2025) - Broadcasting Press Guild
- Podcast of the Year and Best Serialised Podcast (2025) - True Crime Awards
- Edward R Murrow Award for Journalism (2025)
- Gold Signal Awards for True Crime and Sound Design
- Gold in True Crime, and Podcast of the Year - British Podcast Awards
