= Utne Reader =

American quarterly magazine

- Utne Reader, cover from the January–February 2012 issue
- Editor: Christian Williams
- Categories: U.S. politics and public policy
- Frequency: Quarterly
- Founded: 1984
- Company: Ogden Publications
- Country: United States
- Based in: 1503 SW 42nd Street; Topeka, KS 66609-1265 U.S
- Language: English
- Website: utne.com
- ISSN: 8750-0256

Utne Reader (also known as Utne; /ˈʌtni/, UT-nee) is a now-defunct digital digest that collected and reprinted articles on politics, culture, and the environment, generally from alternative media sources including journals, newsletters, weeklies, zines, music, and DVDs. It is no longer accepting submissions, and is defunct.

The magazine's writers and editors contributed book, film, and music reviews and original articles that tended to focus on emerging cultural trends. The magazine's website produces ten blogs covering politics, environment, media, spirituality, science and technology, great writing, and the arts. The publication takes its name from founder Eric Utne. Eric Utne's surname is ultimately derived from the Norwegian village of Utne, which loosely translates as "far out".

== History ==
The magazine was founded in 1984 by Eric Utne as the Utne Reader. Its tagline was "the best of the alternative press". For its first 20 years Jay Walljasper was editor; Julie Ristau was its publisher. During these years it was transformed "from a tiny New Age newsletter to a thick, ad-rich magazine with more than 300,000 subscribers." Utne chaired the magazine until the late 1990s, when his then-wife Nina Rothschild Utne took over. The magazine was headquartered in Minneapolis.

The cover logo was changed to simply Utne in 2003, continuing until 2006, with the subtitle, A Different Read on Life.

In 2006 the magazine was purchased by Ogden Publications, publishers of Grit, Mother Earth News, Natural Home, and other magazines. The earlier title Utne Reader was brought back, and the magazine returned to and refocused on its original mission to reprint "the best of the alternative press".

Utne Reader ceased physical publication in 2019 and is now a digital digest at utne.com. Eric Utne looked into re-acquiring the magazine in 2020 but was rebuffed by the publisher. "'It's sad to see it go', Utne said. 'These times need something like this more than ever. Our editorial credo was to no particular point of view. No one has the sole proprietorship on good ideas. It takes multiple perspectives to come closer to the truth.'"

According to The New York Times, Utne Reader was a leader of the salon movement of the 1980s, devoted to debate on the issues of the day. Utne Reader was an early source of coverage of the mythopoetic men's movement when it first surfaced in the early 1990s.

== Utne Independent Press Awards ==
The magazine bestows annual Utne Independent Press Awards, which honor alternative and independent magazines from around the world. Past winners include the Wilson Quarterly, In These Times, Virginia Quarterly Review, Mother Jones, Orion, High Country News, Gnosis and New Internationalist.

== In popular culture ==
- In The Simpsons episode "King-Size Homer", Lisa Simpson receives a letter for a subscription to the Utne Reader. A later episode, "Dad Behavior", again references Lisa's collection of the magazines.
- In the Family Guy episode "The Son Also Draws", Brian Griffin is seen reading the magazine.
- In Mystery Science Theater 3000 episode "Zombie Nightmare", Tom Servo makes a reference to the magazine's staff during a rather tame and well-dressed disco scene.
- In the webcomic Narbonic, in one of the first few strips in the series, the lab's intern is shown reading the magazine. Later in the comic series, another character makes a reference to the magazine.
- In the second chapter of the novel House of Leaves, the footnotes contain a reference to a fictitious 1993 article from Utne Reader authored by "David Liddel" (also fictitious).
