= Onefinestay =

British holiday rental hospitality company

onefinestay
- Type: Subsidiary
- Industry: Travel
- Genre: Travel agency
- Founded: 2009
- Founder: Greg Marsh; Demetrios Zoppos; Tim Davey; Evan Frank
- Headquarters: London, United Kingdom
- Area served: London, New York, Paris, Los Angeles, Rome
- Products: Hospitality
- Parent: Independent (2009–2016); Accor (2016–present)
- Website: http://www.onefinestay.com

onefinestay is a British hospitality company founded in 2009. The company provides a service to homeowners of distinctive and upmarket properties, by enabling them to let out their home to guests while their home is unoccupied.

== History ==
The idea behind onefinestay was thought up by co-founder and former CEO Greg Marsh in 2009, following a trip to Pisa. A tip off from a local friend took him off the beaten track to Piazza delle Vettovaglie. When Marsh returned to his flat in London, he had a second realisation, it had been empty while he was abroad, and every time he travelled someone else could be experiencing London while staying in his home. Marsh's home was the first to be listed on the onefinestay website when it launched in London, in May 2010. The business grew, and soon expanded internationally, launching in New York in May 2012, in Los Angeles and Paris in September 2013 before launching in Rome in March 2016.

In April 2016, AccorHotels acquired onefinestay. In September 2016, Greg Marsh resigned from onefinestay. The Exclusive Collective acquired a controlling interest from Accor in June 2025. alongside its flagship brand, Exclusive Resorts.

== Funding ==
Marsh, along with Demetrios Zoppos and Tim Davey founded onefinestay in September 2009, and raised a small amount of seed funding from family and friends in 2009.

The website launched in May 2010 with just six homes listed. In February 2011, onefinestay raised $3.7 million Series A funding in a round led by Index Ventures. Other angel investors included: Brent Hoberman, co-founder & CEO of Lastminute.com, Andy Phillipps, co-founder of ActiveHotels, and David Magliano, former Director of Marketing for London's 2012 Olympic bid.

== Operations ==
=== Homeowners ===
onefinestay works with homeowners to rent out their homes to vetted guests when it is empty. In London, Los Angeles, New York and Paris everything is done for the homeowner including all reservations. The home is cleaned before the guests arrive and after they leave; and valuables or anything the homeowner does not want on display is put away. Once a homeowner has been selected to join the service (the company turns down 9 out of 10 homes) onefinestay learns everything about the home, enabling them to answer any guest queries.

=== Services ===
Every guest stay includes a personal welcome and a tour of the home or villa, professional housekeeping and all linens. Guests will also have 24/7 support available throughout their stay.

=== Travel Trade and partners ===
onefinestay works with hospitality partners, travel agents, Centurion (the travel agent from American Express) and Signature.

== Destinations ==
Its homes, villas and chalets are located around the world. This includes London, Paris, Tuscany, the Caribbean, Los Angeles and New York. In New York City it offers stays of 30 nights or more only, priced on a nightly basis. It was the first luxury hospitality brand to offer fully furnished leases with all utilities included, along with its dedicated concierge service and guest support.

== Marketing ==
As a brand its homes and service have appeared in articles including Rolling Stone, describing it as a "hotel-like service from professional cleaning to 24/7 support. L'Officiel USA referred to the company as a "home away from home with all the creature comforts of a luxury boutique hotel". The Guardian said onefinestay is "a fantastic option for staying in London" as it is "Better than house-sitting, in that you have no responsibilities, more interesting than a self-catered property or serviced apartment because the owner's possessions, their style, their touch and their personality remain."

In October 2025, the Condé Nast Traveller's 2025 Readers' Choice Award placed the company number three in the Villa Rental category.
