= Action for Happiness =

Global charitable organization

- Founded: 2010
- Founded at: London, England
- Headquarters: London, England
- Chief Executive: Dr Mark Williamson
- Website: actionforhappiness.org

Action for Happiness (AfH) is a global movement and charity based in the United Kingdom. It aims to increase the happiness in the world by bringing together people and supporting them to take practical action to build a happier society. The patron of Action for Happiness is the Dalai Lama. The movement has over 270,000 members in 190 countries.

== Formation ==
AfH was co-founded in 2010 by Richard Layard (Director of the Wellbeing Programme at the Centre for Economic Performance and Emeritus Professor of Economics at LSE), Sir Anthony Seldon (Historian and Vice-Chancellor of the University of Buckingham), Geoff Mulgan (CEO of Nesta and former CEO of the Young Foundation) and Dr Mark Williamson (who has been its Director since the start).

AfH was originally created and incubated within The Young Foundation, before becoming an independent registered charity in January 2018.

== Definition of happiness ==
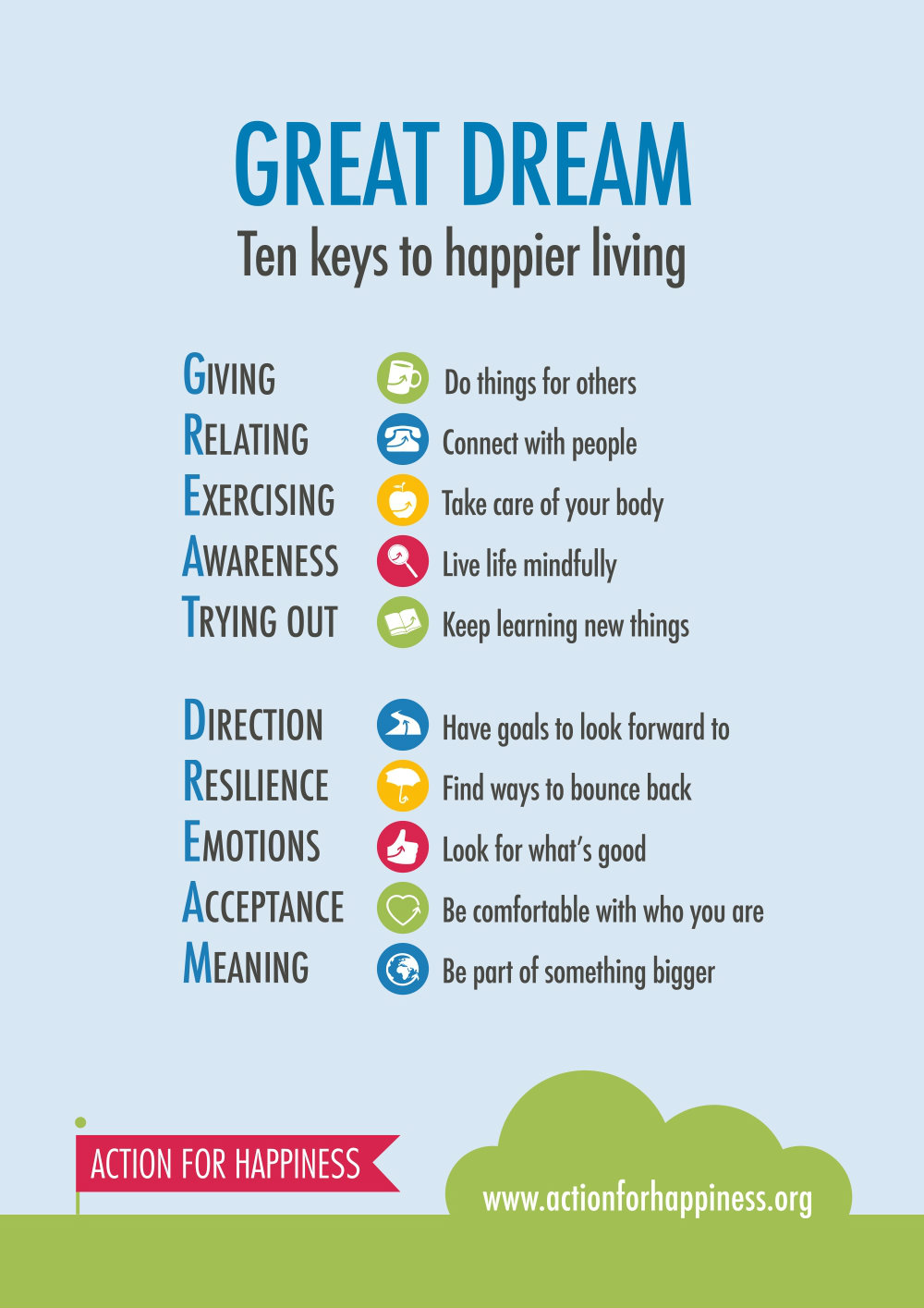
Poster from Action for Happiness on "Ten keys to happier living"

AfH states that "Happiness means feeling good about our lives and wanting to go on feeling that way. Unhappiness means feeling bad and wanting things to change."

=== 10 Keys to Happier Living ===
AfH promotes 10 Keys to Happier Living which were created by Action for Happiness. Their research evidence suggests these Ten Keys are areas which are in the influence of the individual and consistently tend to have a positive impact on people's happiness and well-being. The first five keys Giving Relating Exercising Awareness and Trying Out (GREAT) are about a person's interaction with the outside world. They are based on the Five Ways to Wellbeing developed by the New Economics Foundation on behalf of the Foresight Project on Mental Capital and Wellbeing The second five keys Direction Resilience Emotions Acceptance Meaning (DREAM) relate to the inner world and the person's attitude to life.

== Activities and products ==
=== Exploring What Matters course ===
AfH activities include running 8-week "Exploring What Matters" courses, which have been organized by volunteers at over 250 places around the world and have been "wholeheartedly supported" by the Dalai Lama. The course brings like-minded people together to learn how to increase their own happiness and the happiness of people around them. Participants learn from experts through videos, exercises and a course handbook. They also join in group discussions and are given actions they can take to increase happiness.

In 2020 the Exploring What Matters Course was evaluated by a full Randomised Control Trial (RCT) carried out by academic experts from the Centre for Economic Performance at the London School of Economics, the Wellbeing Research Centre at the University of Oxford and University College London as part of the evidence programme of the What Works Centre for Wellbeing. The RCT course evaluation found that, relative to a control group, the course provides large and statistically significant benefits in three areas: personal wellbeing, mental health and pro-sociality. Participants in the course showed improvements in subjective wellbeing, reductions in symptoms of depression and anxiety and enhanced levels of compassion and social trust.

In terms of personal wellbeing, Life Satisfaction increases by around one whole point on the 0-10 scale, from an average of 6.4 out of 10 before the course to 7.4 after the course. This increase (+1.0) is greater than those from other major life events such as being partnered as opposed to single (+0.59) or being employed as opposed to unemployed (+0.7), when compared with findings from other cross-sectional studies of wellbeing in the UK.

In terms of mental health, the trial found the course significantly decreased depression by about 50% of a standard deviation, and decreased anxiety by 42%. Prior to the course, participants reported average scores corresponding to a clinical symptomatology of mild depression and anxiety. After the course, these scores reduced to a symptomatology of minimal depression and anxiety, the lowest category for both measures.

In terms of pro-sociality, the trial found that participating in the course can make participants more likely to act in ways which help others, with large and statistically significant increases in levels of compassion and social trust.

The course evaluation was covered by The Guardian newspaper and featured on the BBC News at Ten.

=== Monthly action calendars ===
AfH produces monthly calendars with one suggested action that people can take each day to improve their happiness. These daily actions are based on the Ten Keys to Happier Living and distill peer reviewed evidence on what makes people happy into simple actions anyone can take. Each month the calendars are translated into 25 languages and shared around the world on social media. The calendars can be printed out and are used to boost wellbeing at home, work, schools, universities, hospitals and doctor's surgeries. The calendars were downloaded by 2.5 million people in 2018.

=== Action for Happiness app ===
In 2019 AfH released The Action for Happiness app for iOS and Android. The app is based on the themes and daily actions from the monthly calendars. The app sends a daily action each morning and an inspiring message towards the end of the day.

=== Happy Cafes ===
AfH coordinates a network of "Happy Cafes" across the UK and around the world. Happy Cafes are "a friendly and welcoming place to meet other people with a shared interest in promoting happiness and wellbeing". Happy Cafés have a range of literature, posters, pamphlets and postcards relating to happiness on display—and Action for Happiness supporters can identify themselves to each other by wearing a lapel badge available at the Café.

=== Public events with expert speakers ===
AfH runs monthly events in London with expert speakers from around the world presenting on themes related to happiness. An archive of the public talks including sessions with Thupten Jinpa, Dr Kristin Neff, Dr Ranjan Chattergee, Andy Puddicombe, Jeff Sachs, Dr Maria Sidios, Martin Seligman, Matthieu Ricard, Claudia Hammond, Mo Gawdat and Jon Kabat-Zinn are available on the charity's YouTube channel.

== Board and expert advisors ==
The AfH board includes Prof Richard Layard, Sir Anthony Seldon, Geoff Mulgan, Vanessa King and Dr Mark Williamson. The AfH expert advisory group includes Daniel Kahneman and Martin Seligman.

== Linkage with prevention of mental illness ==
Richard Layard's 2011 book Happiness: Lessons from a New Science included research showing that mental illness is the main cause of unhappiness.

In 2016 Mark Williamson said, regarding the increasing number of people being in treatment with mental illnesses, "What we believe is that you can help people develop better habits before that happens. We’ve got the beginnings now of a culture in preventative approaches to physical health problems, with anti-smoking and obesity drives. I think the next 20 years is going to be about massively proactive ways to look after your mental health and your social and emotional well-being, and to really think about what happiness means and how it can be achieved."

== Reaction and criticism ==
AfH has been praised as reclaiming happiness from capitalism by helping people to seize the means of the production of wellbeing arguing for "a new science of happiness that focuses on social behaviour and personal relationships, rather than material possessions and outward appearance."

AfH has also been criticised for pursuing an individual approach to happiness, rather than focusing on societal negative issues such as inequality.

Journalist Janet Street-Porter attended the AfH 8-week Exploring What Matters course in 2015, she said "I've really enjoyed the company of these strangers—which is a first. I heartily recommend the course if you're feeling lonely or miserable."

== See also ==
- Gross National Happiness
- Happiness economics
- World Happiness Report
