= Catherine Fieschi =

Catherine Fieschi is a French-British political analyst, academic, and author whose work focuses on how culture and society intersect with politics and economics. She is the founding director of international advisory and research company Counterpoint... Fieschi's work has been credited with conceptualising a "new vision of populism as an ideology".

== Education ==
Born in Senegal in a family of French diplomats, Fieschi attended secondary schools in France, Italy and the United States before studying at McGill University in Canada. She completed a Ph.D analysing the rise of the French far right in the context of wider European politics in 2000.

== Career ==
In 2005, as director of the University of Nottingham's Centre for the Study of European Governance (CSEG), she wrote a series of articles for Prospect magazine, going on to become a contributing editor, writing on European and UK politics.

In 2005 Fieschi joined the UK think tank Demos, becoming director in 2008.

Between 2009 and 2011 Fieschi was director of research at The British Council, leading the organisation's in-house think tank Counterpoint. In 2011, she led the transformation of Counterpoint into an independent research group (and community interest company) focused on helping decision-makers in business and policy to understand "the cultural factors behind financial, political and security risks to understand the threats and opportunities facing their companies" and organisations more broadly.

Fieschi returned to academia for a number of months from late 2019 to establish the Global Policy Institute at Queen Mary University of London.

== Approach and expertise ==
Fieschi is a comparative analyst: she specialises in using comparative methods to contextualise political, social and cultural dynamics. She has also used psychoanalytic approaches to explore the relationships between individuals, power and institutions in democracies and the implications for political mobilisation and political outcomes.

Fieschi published a first book on populism in 2004, but in 2019 Fieschi's work gained greater prominence with the publication of her book ‘Populocracy: The Tyranny of Authenticity and the Rise of Populism'. The book received widespread attention, including in the Financial Times, which highlighted how Fieschi combines "conceptual analysis with real examples to chart the historic evolution of populism." A review of the book by Ben Margulies of the London School of Economics complemented Fieschi's "novel theoretical contributions" as "a welcome addition to the literature on the subject." A review of the Book in the International Spectator remarked that Fieschi was "one of the prominent scholars in the field of populism studies in the past twenty years".

== Work on the politics of integration and multiculturalism ==
Fieschi has also written on various forms of radicalism, and multiculturalism. In February 2020 she published a report with Brookings on Islam, secularism and populist politics in France
