= Karmarama (advertising agency) =

Advertising agency based in London

- Company type: Private
- Industry: Advertising
- Founded: 2000; 25 years ago in London, United Kingdom
- Headquarters: London
- Website: https://www.karmarama.com

Karmarama is an advertising agency based in London and founded in 2000.

Karmarama was launched by partners Naresh Ramchandani and Dave Buonaguidi in May 2000. Prior to Karmarama they had worked together at HHCL and were creative directors of the London office of Chiat/Day before launching the first advertising agency co-operative St. Luke’s. Buonaguidi then left to be the Creative Director of Channel 4 before teaming up with Ramchandani again two years later to launch Karmarama. They created famous campaigns for Selfridges Tokyo Life before merging with Outfit Communications and Ben Bilboul whom they knew from his role running the IKEA account at St. Luke’s. This led to the renewed relationship with the IKEA account. The agency also began working with clients including Unilever and Heineken.

== History ==
2005 saw the departure of the IKEA business and Ramchandani. However, in 2006, with a line-up of Bilboul and Buonaguidi and the newly appointed Sid McGrath as planning partner, the agency won 14 out of 18 pitches and added clients such as The History Channel, Pipex and Costa Coffee to its roster.

In 2007, the agency was appointed to handle the UK advertising of Nintendo as well working with Coca-Cola on the European product launch of their energy drink Burn.

In 2008, Nicola Mendelsohn, formerly of Grey and Bartle Bogle Hegarty, joined the agency as executive chairman.

In 2011, the agency was appointed to the BBC roster of agencies, working on marketing to support a range of channels and radio stations. The same year, Karmarama also received investment from Phoenix Equity Partners to support further growth of the Karma Communications Group. In early 2012, the Karma Communications Group announced its acquisition of the Crayon group, its next step in creating an integrated force in the independent agency sector.

At the start of 2014, Jon Wilkins, former founder of Naked Communications, was announced as the new executive chairman for the agency.

In August 2014, Karmarama announced the acquisition of Nice Agency, leading mobile specialists who have built platforms for clients including Channel 4, first direct and Ticketmaster.

September 2015, saw Nik Studzinski join the agency as Chief Creative Officer, from Droga5.

In November 2015, Karmarama established a joint venture with the data start up Ignition.ai, founded by James Harrison in 2014.

Karmarama have featured in The Sunday Times Best Companies To Work For multiple times. In 2017, they were the number one communications agency and won the "Innovation in Employment Engagement" award.

In 2016 and 2017, Karmarama won the Grand Prix DMA award for their data-driven content campaigns for Unibet and The Army. The agency also won IPA effectiveness awards for its work with Costa and Plusnet.

In November 2016, Karmarama was acquired by Accenture Interactive.

As of May 2017, Karmarama works with clients including Iceland, Confused.com, Honda, Just Eat and Unilever.

== Awards ==
Karmarama was named Agency of the Year 2011 by Marketing Week magazine. In 2014, Karmarama was named as the top Independent Agency by The Drum magazine. In 2015, Karmarama was the highest ranked agency in The Sunday Times Top 100 Places to Work, coming 22nd out of all the thousands of businesses who entered.
