= High Pay Centre =

UK think tank

- Type: Think tank
- Registration no.: Company Registration (England and Wales) No. 07891638
- Legal status: Private Limited by Guarantee
- Headquarters: London
- Executive Director: Luke Hildyard
- Chair: Nick Isles
- Revenue: £94,239 (2016)
- Expenses: £94,239 (2016)
- Staff: 2 (2018)

The High Pay Centre is a UK think tank carrying out research and analysis on issues relating to top incomes, corporate governance, and business performance. The Centre is generally critical of existing top pay practices, and advocates policies designed to reduce economic inequality. HPC research and commentary on high pay and inequality are regularly cited in the UK media.

Since 2014, the Centre has promoted 'fatcat day', usually occurring in the first week of January, marking the date on which the earnings for the average FTSE 100 Chief Executive surpasses the amount that the average UK worker can expect to earn all year.

The Centre was established by Compass in 2009 as the High Pay Commission, and changed its name to the High Pay Centre following publication of the final report of the Commission.

Funders for project work during 2018 include Joseph Rowntree Charitable Trust (£50,000) and Chartered Institute of Personnel and Development (£25,000).

== Funding ==
The High Pay Centre has been awarded an A grade for funding transparency, the highest transparency rating (rating goes from A to E), by Who Funds You?
