= Jay Walljasper =

American writer (died 2020)

- Jay Walljasper at Minneapolis street cafe with local newspaper
- Born: 1955
- Died: December 22, 2020 (aged 65)
- Education: University of Iowa
- Occupations: Writer, editor, speaker, community consultant
- Employers: Augsburg University (urban-writer-in-residence); Project for Public Spaces; Social Life Project
- Known for: Urban planning, placemaking, advocacy for walkable communities
- Notable work: Editor of Utne Reader (15 years)

Jay Walljasper (died 22 December 2020) was an American writer, editor, speaker, and community consultant. He explored how new ideas in urban planning, placemaking, tourism, community development, sustainability, politics and culture could alter urban livability for the better. R.T. Rybak, mayor of Minneapolis (2002–14), wrote: "I've read scores of books and articles on cities, heard by now most of the very best urban minds . . . much of what I said that mattered as mayor was deeply influenced by Jay." He died of kidney cancer at 65 years old.

== Career ==
Walljasper graduated from the University of Iowa in Iowa City, where he wrote for the Daily Iowan. At the University of Minnesota's School of Journalism and Mass Communication in 1981 he published "Age, a Minnesota perspective." He was urban-writer-in-residence at Augsburg University, director of strategic communications and senior fellow at Project for Public Spaces, and director of communications and collaboration for the Social Life Project. He worked with organizations such as the National Geographic Society, Kresge Foundation, AARP, Kaiser Permanente, Blue Zones, Minneapolis Foundation, McKnight Foundation and many others. According to the non-profit America Walks, he "helped walking and walkable communities gain broader appeal" through research, networking, advocacy, and journalism.

For 15 years, he was editor of Utne Reader magazine. During these years Utne Reader was transformed "from a tiny New Age newsletter to a thick, ad-rich magazine with more than 300,000 subscribers." It was nominated three times for the National Magazine Award for general excellence. He was also a contributing editor at National Geographic Traveler, executive editor at Netherlands-based Ode magazine, and a travel editor at Better Homes and Gardens. He was inspired by the train stations, parks, and vibrant sidewalks in diverse European cities.

His articles appeared in Washington Monthly, City Lab, Notre Dame magazine, San Francisco Chronicle, Midwest Living, Mother Jones, Preservation, New Statesman (London), Chicago Tribune magazine, Philadelphia Inquirer magazine, Toronto Star, Tikkun, L.A. Weekly, Yes! magazine, E magazine, Le Courrier (Paris), The Idler, Rock N Rap Confidential, Planeta Humano (Madrid), and New Woman (Australia).

In 2013 Walljasper was commissioned by the McKnight Foundation to contribute to its Food for Thought series addressing future challenges and opportunities in the Minneapolis–Saint Paul region. A River Runs Through Us: Why the Mississippi is Crucial to MSP's Future was published in 2014.

Walljasper published four dozen articles in the independent MinnPost during 2012–19 on such themes as urban strategies for the Twin Cities; walking, lakes, biking, brewpubs, urban transit, and the tech scene as local-development resources; profiles of larger and smaller towns across Minnesota; urban lessons from Toronto, Seattle, Denver; and various grassroots efforts to counter inequality. On a wider canvas, he wrote ten articles for Huffington Post on biking, walking, and urban issues, profiling Philadelphia, Indianapolis, Quebec, and Pine Ridge, South Dakota.

== Works ==
- Visionaries, People and Ideas to Change Your Life, with Jon Spayde and Utne Reader staff (New Society, 2001) ISBN 978-0-86571-445-8
- The Great Neighborhood Book: A Do-it-Yourself Guide to Placemaking (New Society, 2007) ISBN 978-0-86571-581-3 publisher website
- All That We Share: A Field Guide to the Commons, with Bill McKibben introduction (New York: New Press 2011) ISBN 978-1-59558-499-1 publisher website
- How to Design Our World for Happiness: The commons guide to placemaking, public space, and enjoying a convivial life (OnTheCommons, 2013) archived here
- A River Runs Through Us: Why the Mississippi is Crucial to MSP's Future (Minneapolis: McKnight Foundation, 2014) archived here
- America's Walking Renaissance, co-authored with Kate Kraft and Heidi Simon (Bethesda MD: America Walks, 2016) download here.
- "Treasure Hunt (During which a world traveler discovers what he loves about his hometown)" Notre Dame Magazine (Autumn 2020) archived here
