= Nicola Mendelsohn =

British advertising executive (born 1971)

The Right Honourable The Lady Mendelsohn CBE
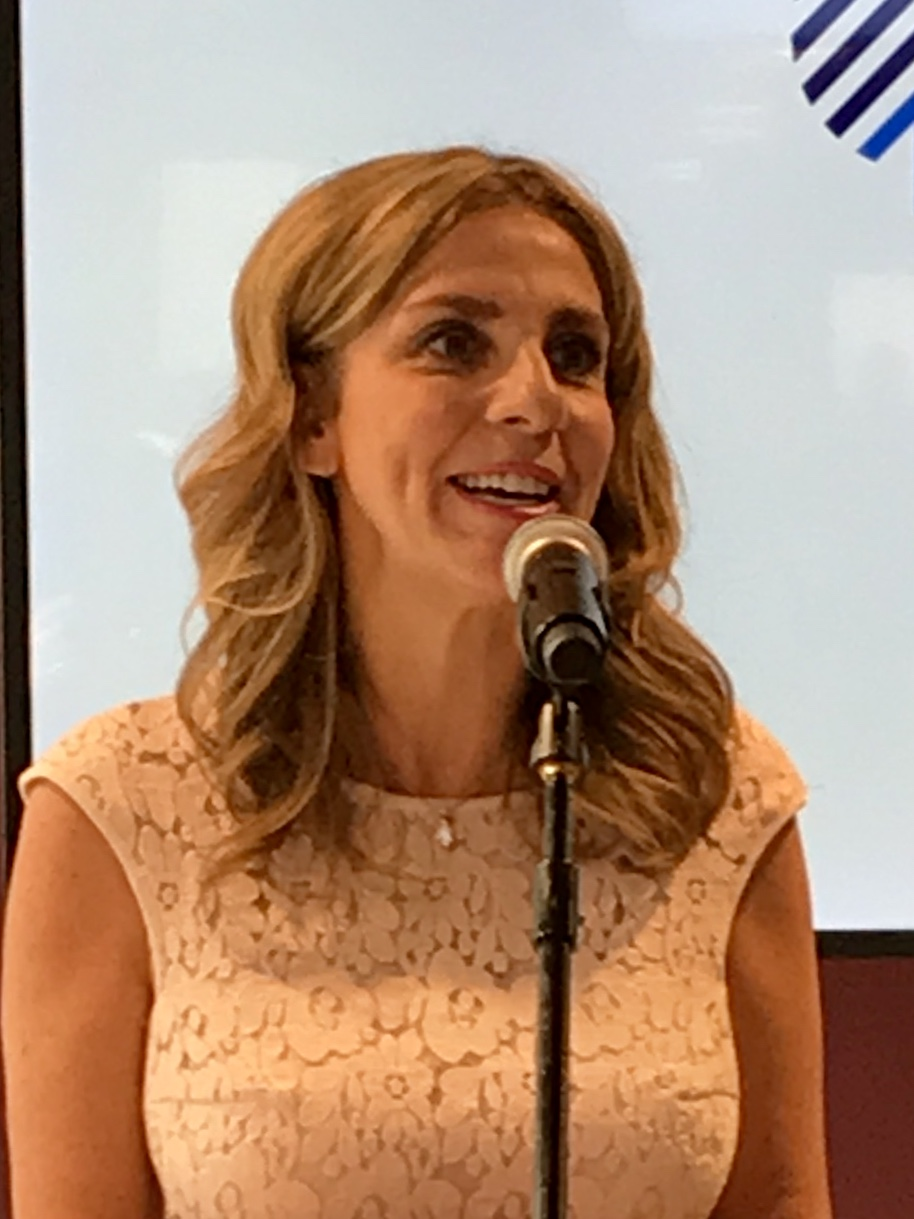
- Mendelsohn in 2018
- Born: Nicola Sharon Clyne; 29 August 1971 (age 55); Manchester, England
- Education: Manchester High School for Girls; University of Leeds
- Occupation: Vice President Global Business Group
- Years active: 2013–present
- Employer: Meta
- Predecessor: Joanna, Baroness Shields
- Spouse: Jonathan Mendelsohn
- Children: 4

Nicola Sharon Mendelsohn, Baroness Mendelsohn, CBE (née Clyne; born 29 August 1971), is a British advertising executive. Active in the advertising industry since 1992, Mendelsohn serves as the head of global advertising relationships for Facebook, and also sits on the board of Diageo. The Daily Telegraph has called her "the most powerful woman in the British tech industry".

== Early life and education ==
Nicola Sharon Clyne was born in Manchester, England. Her parents run a kosher catering business, and the family maintained an Orthodox Jewish home.

From 1989 to 1992, she attended the University of Leeds, graduating with a bachelor's degree in English and Theatre Studies, and was active in Jewish causes.

== Career ==
Mendelsohn originally planned to attend drama school and become an actress, but on a friend's recommendation decided to explore advertising instead. After working at Bartle Bogle Hegarty, she became Deputy Chairman of Grey London in April 2004. In April 2008 she became partner and executive chairman at Karmarama, a London advertising agency.

In 2013 she was hired as Facebook's advertising Vice President for EMEA, ending the company's half-year search to replace outgoing VP Joanna Shields.

== Affiliations ==
Mendelsohn is co-chair of the Creative Industries Council and director of the Bailey's Prize for Women's Fiction. In April 2011 she became the first female president of the Institute of Practitioners in Advertising, serving a two-year term.

In September 2014 she became a non-executive director of Diageo. Previously, she was a board director for Bartle Bogle Hegarty and the Fragrance Foundation, chairman of the corporate board of Women's Aid, trustee of The White Ribbon Alliance, and president of the Women's Advertising Club of London.

== Honours and recognition ==
In 2015 she was made a Commander of the Order of the British Empire (CBE) for services to the creative industries as part of the 2015 Queen's Birthday Honours.

Also in 2015, Computer Weekly ranked Mendelsohn number 34 on its "50 Most Influential Women in UK IT 2015", she was named one of the Most Inspiring Women in European Tech by the Inspiring Fifty organisation, and Debrett's included her on their "People of Influence" in the Debrett's 500 2015 list.

In 2014 she was included on GQ's list of the 100 Most Connected Women in Britain, and ranked number 85 on The Jewish Chronicle's Power 100 list.

In 2013, she ranked number 69 on The Guardian's "MediaGuardian 100 2013". In 2011 she was named one of Advertising Age's "Women to Watch". In 2005 Management Today included her on its list of the top 35 women under 35 in the business world.

In 2017, she was awarded an honorary Doctorate at the University of Salford.

In 2019, Mendelsohn was 34th in Computer Weekly's 50 "Most Influential Women in UK Tech" shortlist.

She was ranked 28th on Fortune's list of Most Powerful Women in 2023.

== Philanthropy ==
On World Cancer Day (4 February 2018) she made public that she had been diagnosed with follicular lymphoma, an incurable cancer of the blood. Mendelsohn said that she made the announcement to raise awareness about the cancer, describing it as not rare but little-known.

Nicola launched The Follicular Lymphoma Foundation in 2019 – a charity dedicated to funding research into the disease and supporting patients. The organization is dedicated to helping those with the condition “live well”. It will also aim to raise $20m (£15.5m) in its first three years and is hoping to find a cure to the disease within the next decade.

== Personal ==
She married Jonathan Mendelsohn, a British lobbyist and Labour political organiser, in 1994. He was created a life peer as Baron Mendelsohn, of Finchley in the London Borough of Barnet in 2013. She and her husband are Jewish and are active in their synagogue and Jewish community.

== Selected articles ==
- "Do what you'd do if you weren't afraid, says Facebook's Nicola Mendelsohn". Marketing. 30 June 2015.
- "Reflecting on Women's Achievements on International Women's Day". HuffPost. 6 March 2015.
