= Taylor Review =

The Taylor Review with the full title Good Work: The Taylor Review of Modern Working Practices (July 2017) was a review submitted to the UK government concerning employee and worker rights in UK labour law. The review team which produced the review was chaired by Matthew Taylor, Chief Executive of the Royal Society of the Arts. Its aim was "to consider how employment practices need to change in order to keep pace with modern business models" and the report made a series of recommendations for reform. The final report was published on 11 July 2017 as a 116-page PDF document, alongside many invited submissions, released in full.

The government published a "vision for the future of the UK labour market" in its Good Work Plan on 17 December 2018, through which it proposed to take forward "virtually all the recommendations" in the Taylor Review.
