= Labour Solidarity Campaign =

Political group in the United Kingdom

The Labour Solidarity Campaign was a British political organisation associated with the Labour Party, founded in February 1981.

Born out of the right wing of the Labour Party's struggles with its left wing, it saw itself as protecting the mainstream democratic tradition within the Labour Party, to ensure an electable future party of government while countering undemocratic forces of the far left. It was seen as a successor to the Manifesto Group. Its name was based on that of the Polish independent trade union.

It was a reaction both to the Labour Party conference in January 1981 which changed the system for electing the Labour Party leader, and to the Limehouse Declaration which led to 28 Labour MPs eventually joining the Social Democratic Party. Initial leading members included John Smith, Roy Hattersley, Peter Shore, Ken Woolmer, and Austin Mitchell, and over 100 Labour MPs attended its launch meeting.

The campaign successfully enabled the close re-election of Denis Healey as Labour's deputy leader. While frequently successful in getting its supporters elected to the Shadow Cabinet, it was less successful in constituency elections to the Labour Party's National Executive Committee. It campaigned on the issue of "one member, one vote" for the constituency section for elections of the Labour leadership, achieved after its dissolution. After the 1987 United Kingdom general election, it became clear that Labour Solidarity's direct influence in parliament had weakened and that its supporters would need to work with the moderating Kinnockite soft-left to pursue their objectives. It dissolved itself in 1988, with many of its themes being taken up by a rejuvenated Labour First campaign.
