= LLM Communications =

Political lobbying firm

- Formerly: Lawson Lucas Mendelsohn
- Type: Private
- Industry: Political lobbying
- Founded: 7 February 1997; 29 years ago
- Founders: Neal Lawson; Ben Lucas; Jonathan Mendelsohn
- Defunct: 10 December 2013
- Fate: Acquired by Financial Dynamics (2005); dissolved (2013)
- Owner: Robert Stephen Holdings (40%)
- Number of employees: 20

LLM Communications (until 2000 Lawson Lucas Mendelsohn) was a political lobbying firm founded after the May 1997 general election by Neal Lawson, Ben Lucas, and Jonathan Mendelsohn. LLM was prominently involved in the Lobbygate scandal of 1998.

== History ==
=== Establishment ===
Neal Lawson, Ben Lucas and Jonathan Mendelsohn were former advisers to Labour Party's newly elected Prime Minister Tony Blair and ex-employees of the Lowe Bell public relations business of Margaret Thatcher's three-time campaign adviser Sir Tim Bell. Lucas had also previously advised Jack Straw from 1992 to 1996.

LLM was set up as Ibis (351) Ltd by the law firm Titmuss Sainer Dechert in February 1997, before being renamed to Lawson Lucas Mendelsohn and handed over to Mendelsohn in May 1997; Lucas and Lawson joined six weeks later. The company was launched as a "breakaway agency" from Bell against the background of Labour's landslide electoral victory of May 1997, exploiting peak demand for mediation between the business sector and the regulatory ambitions of the new government.

The firm's mission statement "The Passing World and The Emerging World" promised to bring an "ethical" dimension to lobbying, while replacing "ideology" with "pragmatism" and "what you do" with "how you do it". Its business model involved "reshaping corporate culture" and greenwashing practices as part of a bid for political favours. The founders, self-confessed Blairites, declared the company would not lobby in "politically or morally indefensible" interests, among which they named the tobacco industry and gun manufacturers seeking the liberalisation of the British firearms regulation. Shortly after its establishment, LLM took on the job of advising RSPCA's Campaign for the Protection of Hunted Animals in support of Labour MP Michael Foster's unsuccessful bill proposal against fox hunting.

The firm received £2 million in earnings from its first year of operations.

=== Lobbygate ===
In July 1998, the company directors were embroiled in the Lobbygate scandal after Greg Palast, an undercover reporter for The Observer posing as an overseas business client seeking to bypass UK state regulation, recorded them offering leaks of government information, seats on government task forces and privileged ministerial access, with Lawson saying they could reach "anyone". Lucas was subsequently accused of attempting to sell the pre-publication text of Chancellor Gordon Brown's Mansion House speech addressing the financial sector.

During the same month, LLM was reported to have saved Tesco £20 million per annum by persuading ministers to abandon plans for a supermarket car park tax, proposed by the Environment Select Committee in order to promote the use of public transport. On LLM's advice, Tesco contributed £11 million to the construction of the Millennium Dome, a project overseen by Peter Mandelson and personally decided by Tony Blair.

Around that time, LLM also helped Rupert Murdoch's News International obtain protection from the eventual Competition Act 1998 and concessions weakening trade unions in the eventual Employment Relations Act 1999, both in return for press coverage favourable to the Blair government.

LLM was revealed to have received a contract from the Audit Commission, a public body, to carry out "political monitoring". It was reported by the Conservative MP John Redwood to be 40%-owned by Stephen Rubin's company Robert Stephen Holdings.

=== Later activities ===
LLM was listed among the companies supplying tickets for dinner to Labour Party members in 1999.

Lawson left the company in December 2004, having become "uneasy" with what New Labour was doing within six months of its 1997 election, but remaining long enough to ensure that it would survive.

While working for LLM, Jonathan Mendelsohn was a lobbyist for the gambling companies Ladbrokes (in the lead-up to the Gambling Act 2005) and PartyGaming.

Mendelsohn resigned in July 2005, as LLM – the "largest independent lobbying firm" in the UK at the time – was acquired by the City of London-based public relations company Financial Dynamics to assist with the expansion of lobbying activities to Washington, DC.

After Lucas quit in January 2008, the entity was legally renamed to FD Public Affairs Ltd in December 2008 and dissolved in December 2013.

The firm had 20 employees and 40 clients. Its other high-profile clients included KPMG, Orange, the Royal Pharmaceutical Society (along with its associates in the LLM-formed Community Pharmacy Action Group, including the Pharmaceutical Services Negotiating Committee, the Company Chemists' Association, and the Proprietary Association of Great Britain), and the Local Government Association.
