= The Political Quarterly =

Academic journal of political science

- Discipline: Political science
- Language: English
- Edited by: Ben Jackson, Deborah Mabbett

Publication details
- History: 1914–present
- Publisher: Wiley-Blackwell for The Political Quarterly Publishing Co. Ltd
- Frequency: Quarterly
- Impact factor: 1.780 (2018)

Standard abbreviations
- ISO 4: Political Q.

Indexing
- ISSN: 0032-3179 (print); 1467-923X (web)
- LCCN: 32005946
- OCLC no.: 859661871

Links
- Journal homepage; Online access; Online archive

The Political Quarterly is an academic journal of political science that first appeared from 1914 to 1916 and was revived by Leonard Woolf, Kingsley Martin, and William A. Robson in 1930. Ben Jackson (University of Oxford) and Deborah Mabbett (Birkbeck University of London) were appointed editors-in-chief in 2016.

The journal, which has print and digital editions, is broadly centre-left in outlook. It has published articles on politics and public policy by a wide range of political thinkers in the UK and internationally. It aims to provide access to current academic debates and draw on critical intellectual arguments, but its hallmark is the use of plain English, avoiding theoretical and technical jargon.

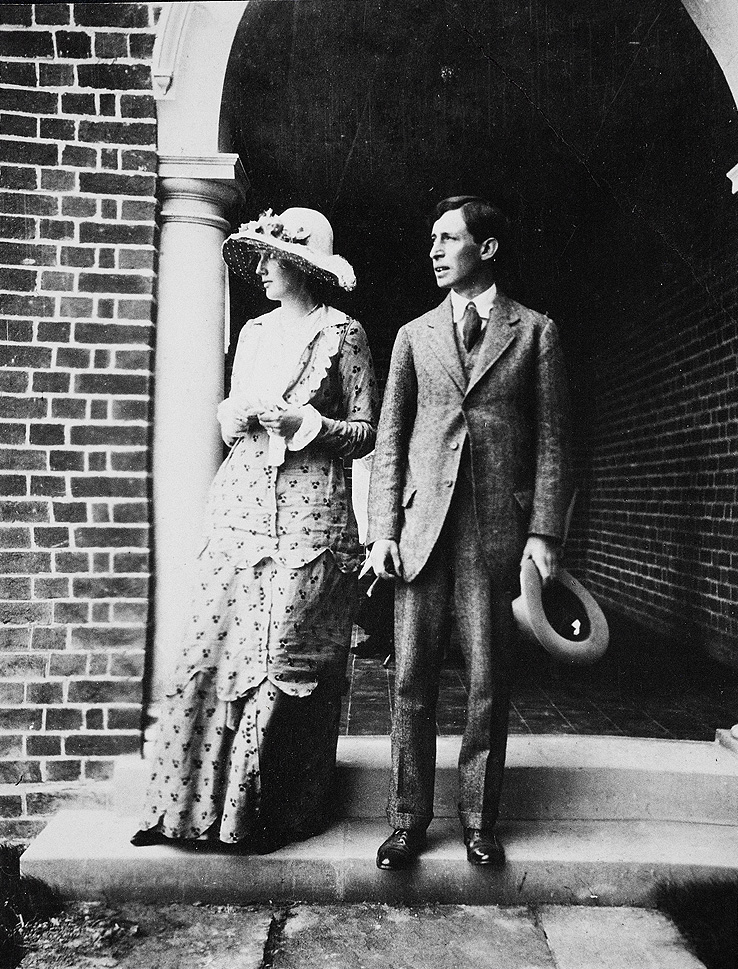
Virginia and Leonard Woolf

The journal is published by Wiley-Blackwell. Former editors include Leonard Woolf, Andrew Gamble, Kingsley Martin, Sir Bernard Crick, Michael Jacobs, and David Marquand. Besides an online blog, the journal publishes books. Titles include Rethinking Capitalism: Economics and Policy for Sustainable and Inclusive Growth by Michael Jacobs and Mariana Mazzucato (2016) and Defending Politics. Bernard Crick at The Political Quarterly, edited by Stephen Ball (2013).

The journal organises political debates and events including its Annual Lecture series. It is also one of the sponsors of the prestigious annual Orwell Prize for political writing. According to the Journal Citation Reports, the journal has a 2018 impact factor of 1.780.

== History ==
The journal was, in its initial manifestation, founded and edited by W. G. S. Adams and first appeared in February 1914 under the imprint of Humphrey Milford at Oxford University Press. It described itself as "a journal of contemporary political studies" that aimed to provide "a broad and an impartial consideration of modern political and social development". Due to wartime constraints, the journal ceased publication in 1916. The cessation was lamented by Adams's friend Harold Laski when, in his inaugural lecture at the London School of Economics in 1926, he referred to the resultant lack of any journal of political science.

Such lack was remedied with the revival of the title four years later in what Arthur Salter described as a "continuation" of Adams' Political Quarterly and a "living tribute to his fruitful initiative". In the balance of this article, reference to the Political Quarterly is to the journal as re-established in 1930. Kingsley Martin and William Robson, who were then junior members of the teaching staff of the London School of Economics and Political Science, took the lead in bringing the idea to fruition. As William Robson later wrote: "We felt the need for a forum where a philosophy, a policy and a programme could be hammered out for the socialist movement, which was growing in strength but was lacking a coherent body of ideas. ... The Political Quarterly ... was to provide a bridge between the world of thought and the world of action, between the writer, the thinker and the teacher on the one hand and the statesman, the politician and the official on the other." Leonard Woolf later described the journal as being "written for experts by experts".

== First meeting ==
The first meeting was held at the London School of Economics and consisted of about 40 or 50 leading intellectuals. Soon afterwards the founders issued a printed prospectus. The signatories included adherents of both the Labour and Liberal parties, and some were not known to belong to any party.

== First edition ==
The minimum amount considered necessary to ensure a trial run of three years was £2,000, allowing for substantial deficits during this period. Martin, Robson and Woolf persuaded a number of their friends and acquaintances to contribute sums varying from £5 to £150, but the total came to less than half the amount needed. After a series of persuasive letters from Robson, Bernard Shaw was convinced to donate £1,000 to plug the gap. They set up a small committee to take responsibility for launching the quarterly. This consisted of Leonard Woolf, A. M. Carr-Saunders, Harold Laski, J. M. Keynes, T. E. Gregory, Kingsley Martin and William Robson.

Publication by Macmillan began in January 1930. Virginia Woolf hand-sewed early editions of the journal.

== Early years ==
The first issue of The Political Quarterly stated:

"The function of The Political Quarterly will be to discuss social and political questions from a progressive point of view. It will act as a clearing-house of ideas and a medium of constructive thought. It will not be tied to any party and will publish contributions from persons of various political affiliations. It will be a journal of opinion, not of propaganda. But it has been planned by a group of writers who hold certain general political ideas in common and it will not be a mere collection of unrelated articles..."

The year before the financial crisis of 1931 was a difficult moment at which to launch a new periodical. The journal experienced significant losses in 1930, 1931 and 1932. However, it managed to survive, and among those who helped them was Sir Stafford Cripps. In 1933 Robson approached George Bernard Shaw for further funding, but he flatly refused, writing: "Derelict magazines are hard to kill; or rather they are hard to bury… I think it shocking to bleed Cripps personally to keep the wreck afloat".

Kingsley Martin was appointed editor of The New Statesman and The Nation. In the summer of 1931 he retired as joint editor of The Political Quarterly and was succeeded by Leonard Woolf. Martin remained a member of the editorial board until his death in 1969 and he took a continuing interest in the paper he helped to found. During the 1930s, the Political Quarterly carried articles by such noted figures as Leon Trotsky, C. P. Scott, R. H. Tawney, Bertrand Russell and Mary Stocks.

== Early board members ==
Of the original nine members, John Maynard Keynes, G. Lowes Dickinson, Harold Laski, Kingsley Martin and Leonard Woolf continued to serve until they died. William Robson details the board changes in his account of the early history of the journal:

“J. L. Hammond withdrew in 1933 owing to ill-health. Sir Alexander Carr-Saunders resigned in July 1938 on becoming Director of the London School of Economics, which he felt was incompatible with any political commitment. Sir Theodore Gregory, who lived abroad a great deal, resigned in 1940. Sir Arthur Salter (now Lord Salter) joined the Board in 1932 and resigned in January 1940 when he became a minister. He rejoined in 1948 but left in 1951 on becoming a member of Winston Churchill’s Caretaker Government. Sir Ernest Simon (later Lord Simon of Wythenshawe) joined the Board in 1935 and played an active and valuable part until his death in 1960. G. D. H. Cole served from 1946 until his death in 1959 and gave us much help and advice. Barbara Wootton (Baroness Wootton) was a member from 1951 until 1966, when she withdrew owing to pressure of parliamentary and other obligations. R. H. S. Crossman was a colleague from 1940 to 1960. Professor B. C. Roberts was on the Board for ten years from 1957. A. L. Rowse was a member of the Board for a short time between 1943 and 1946.”

== During and after the Second World War ==
The Political Quarterly had an instrumental role in assembling centre-left ideas during and after World War II.

== 1980s and split of the Labour Party ==
Although the Political Quarterly's board from time to time contained occasional Conservatives and Liberals, and contributors had ranged from Benito Mussolini to Leon Trotsky, there was a tendency for most people associated with the journal to have some kind of affiliation to the Labour Party. This came under severe strain in the early 1980s, when the party itself split, with a breakaway group forming the short-lived Social Democratic Party. This split was reproduced within the Political Quarterly's Board. About half of the Board continued, along with the then chair, Bernard Crick, to stay with Labour, while others, including the editor at the time, Rudolf Klein, and one of the founders of the SDP, Shirley Williams, went with the new party.

For a time, relations within the Board became tense, with proposals for new board members or editors being scrutinised suspiciously for their effects on the balance. The decision to have two editors dated from that time, with Colin Crouch (a Labour supporter) being appointed alongside Klein. On Klein’s retirement he was replaced by David Marquand, another SDP founder. The tensions subsided, the idea of having two editors being retained just in order to make the work less onerous.

== Editors-in-chief ==
(Dates indicate date of change)

- William Robson and Kingsley Martin, 1930
- William Robson and Leonard Woolf, 1931
- Leonard Woolf alone (Robson on war service), 1941–45
- William Robson and Tom McKitterick, 1958
- Bernard Crick and William Robson, 1966
- Bernard Crick and John Mackintosh, 1975
- Bernard Crick and David Watt, 1978
- Rudolf Klein and David Watt, 1980/81
- Rudolf Klein and Colin Crouch, 1985
- Colin Crouch and David Marquand, 1987
- David Marquand and Tony Wright, 1995
- Tony Wright and Andrew Gamble, 1997
- Tony Wright and Michael Jacobs, 2012 [MJ first issue is last of 2012]
- Tony Wright and Deborah Mabbett, 2014 [DM first issue is first of 2014]
- Deborah Mabbett and Ben Jackson, 2016 [BJ first issue is first of 2016]

== Annual lectures ==
The journal organises political debates and events including its ‘Annual Lecture’ series. Past lectures have included:

- 2018: Fintan O'Toole – 'The Nightmare of History: Brexit, Ireland and the English Revolution'
- 2018: Timothy Garton Ash – 'What went wrong with liberalism? And what should liberals do about it?'
- 2017: Professor David Runciman – ‘Nobody Knows Anything: Why is Politics so Surprising?’
- 2016: Andy Haldane – ‘Who Owns a Company?’
- 2015: Professor Colin Crouch (held in 2016) – ‘Citizens, Customers, Politicians, Professionals and Money Men’
- 2014: Professor Paul Ginsborg – 'Recent Italian Politics in Historical Perspective'
- 2013: Professor John Kay – 'The Future of Capitalism'
- 2012: Shami Chakrabati – 'Citizens' Privileges or Human Rights? The Great Bill of Rights Swindle'
- 2011: David Miliband – '2010 Why is the European Left Losing Elections?'
- 2010: Ian Blair – 'Policing: Continuity, consensus and controversy'
- 2009: Tony Wright – 'Is there a way forward to bridge the divide between politician and voter?'

== Selected publications ==
- Jacobs, M. and Mazzucato, M. (2016) Rethinking Capitalism: Economics and Policy for Sustainable and Inclusive Growth, Wiley-Blackwell, ISBN 978-1-119-12095-7
- Ball, S. ed. (2013) Defending Politics. Bernard Crick at The Political Quarterly, Wiley-Blackwell, ISBN 978-1-4443-5133-0
- Edwards, J. (ed). (2012) Retrieving The Big Society, Wiley-Blackwell, ISBN 978-1-1183-6878-7
- Diamond, P. and Kenny, M. (eds). (2011) Reassessing New Labour: Market, State and Society under Blair and Brown, Wiley-Blackwell, ISBN 978-1-4443-5134-7
- Gamble, A. and Wright, T. (eds). (2011) The Progressive Tradition: Eighty Years of The Political Quarterly, Wiley-Blackwell, ISBN 978-1-4443-4993-1
- Uberoi, V. Coutts, A. McLean, I. Halpern, D. (eds). (2010) Options for Britain II: Cross Cutting Policy Issues - Changes and Challenges, Wiley-Blackwell, ISBN 978-1-4443-3395-4
- Gamble, A. Wright, T. (eds). (2009) Britishness: Perspectives on the British Question, Wiley-Blackwell, ISBN 978-1-4051-9269-9
- Dench, G. (2006) The Rise and Rise of Meritocracy, Wiley-Blackwell, ISBN 978-1-4051-4719-4
- Lloyd, J. and Seaton, J. (eds). (2006) What Can Be Done? Making the Media and Politics Better, Wiley-Blackwell, ISBN 978-1-4051-3693-8
- Gamble, A. and Wright, T. (eds). (2004). Restating the State? Wiley-Blackwell, ISBN 978-1-4051-2454-6
- Menon, A. (2004) Britain and European Integration: Views from Within, Wiley-Blackwell, ISBN 978-1-4051-2672-4
- Spencer, S. (2003) The Politics of Migration: Managing Opportunity, Conflict and Change, Wiley-Blackwell, ISBN 978-1-4051-1635-0
- Freedman, L. (ed). Superterrorism: Policy Responses, Wiley-Blackwell, ISBN 978-1-4051-0593-4
- Crick, B. (ed). (2001) Citizens: Towards a Citizenship Culture, Wiley-Blackwell, ISBN 978-0-631-22856-1
- Nettler, R. and Marquand, D. (eds.) (2000) Religion and Democracy, Wiley-Blackwell, ISBN 978-0-631-22184-5
- Gamble, A. and Wright, T. (1999). The New Social Democracy, Wiley-Blackwell, ISBN 978-0-631-21765-7
- Seaton, J. (ed). (1998) Politics and the Media: Harlots and Prerogatives at the Turn of the Millennium, Wiley-Blackwell, ISBN 978-0-631-209416
- Jacobs, M. (ed). (1998) Greening the Millennium? The New Politics of the Environment, Wiley-Blackwell, ISBN 978-0-631-20619-4
- Crouch, C. and Marquand, D. (1996) Reinventing Collective Action: From the Global to the Local, Wiley-Blackwell, ISBN 978-0-631-19721-8
