= Breakfast Club (British politics) =

Group of Labour MPs

The Breakfast Club referred to an informal group of four Labour Party politicians, set up following the party's defeat in the 2015 General Election, amid leadership speculation.

The four members gained their seats at the 2010 General Election, and were seen to be from the 'Blairite' third way wing of the party:

- Chuka Umunna, then Shadow Secretary of State for Business, Innovation and Skills (defected to the Liberal Democrats in 2019)
- Tristram Hunt, then Shadow Secretary of State for Education (left Parliament to become Director of the Victoria and Albert Museum in 2017)
- Liz Kendall, then Shadow Minister for Care and Older People (later ran for Labour leader)
- Emma Reynolds, then Shadow Secretary of State for Communities and Local Government (lost her seat in the 2019 General Election)

All members endorsed Liz Kendall's bid for leadership of the party, although Kendall's commitment to the group had been disputed, with reported absences from group meetings and one MP reportedly saying “I don’t think Liz eats breakfast.”

The term was in reference to early morning meetings in Portcullis House, reportedly "to plot the future."

== See also ==
- Notting Hill set
