= The Manifesto Group =

The Manifesto Group was a British parliamentary alliance of Labour MPs led by Dickson Mabon (who preferred to be known as Dick Mabon), who were opposed to what they perceived to be the leftward drift of the Labour Party in the 1970s.

== History ==
In 1974, the left-wing Labour MP Ian Mikardo was elected as chairman of the Parliamentary Labour Party. Dickson Mabon was opposed to this, as he saw it as evidence of a drift towards the left. As a result, he launched the Manifesto Group of Labour MPs on 17 December 1974, to counterbalance it and to support Labour MPs who "did not regard defending the [Labour] Government as a betrayal of socialism".

== Membership ==
Membership of the Manifesto Group included John Smith, Denis Healey, George Robertson, Roy Hattersley, Gerald Kaufman and Jack Cunningham. It also included Brian Walden, David Marquand, John Horam, Ian Wrigglesworth, the then Father of the House George Strauss, the former Foreign Secretary Michael Stewart, Ben Ford, Giles Radice and Phillip Whitehead. It also included many members who were later to defect to the SDP, such as Roy Jenkins, Bill Rogers, Shirley Williams and David Owen, including Dickson Mabon himself.

== Organisation ==
Unlike the "Keep Calm" group of 1952, the Manifesto Group did not seek to reconcile opposing wings of the Labour Party, and instead rigorously opposed the left. Mabon ensured the electoral success of Manifesto members to senior positions in the Labour Party, such as the Cabinet and NEC. George Robertson, who later became Secretary of State for Defence under Prime Minister Tony Blair, said that Manifesto under Dickson Mabon organised elections better than the Tribune Group had ever managed to.

== Success ==
Two of the Manifesto Group's greatest achievements were the election of moderate Labour MP Cledwyn Hughes as Chairman of the Parliamentary Labour Party, and the election of James Callaghan as Labour leader in April 1976, who then became Prime Minister in the Labour-majority Parliament.

== Replacement ==
Following the stated intention of many key members of Manifesto, including that of Dickson Mabon himself, to leave the Labour Party, it was replaced in 1981 by the Labour Solidarity Campaign. The small majority of moderate Denis Healey over Tony Benn in the Deputy Leadership Contest of September 1981, and the party votes for unilateral nuclear disarmament and withdrawal from the EEC, solidified their decision, and many left to form the Social Democratic Party.
