= Demos (UK think tank) =

UK charity focusing on public policy

- Formation: 1993; 33 years ago
- Type: Think tank
- Legal status: Charity
- Headquarters: 15 Whitehall, London, SW1A 2DD
- Location: London
- Chief Executive: Polly Curtis
- Website: www.demos.co.uk

Demos is a cross-party think tank based in the United Kingdom with a cross-party political viewpoint. Founded in 1993, Demos works with a number of partners including government departments, public sector agencies and charities. It specialises in public policymaking in a range of areas – from education and skills to health and housing.

Demos houses the Centre for the Analysis of Social Media (CASM), which leads the study of how the rise of the digital world affects politics, policy and decision-making.

The current Chief Executive is Polly Curtis, a former journalist and editor at The Guardian, HuffPost UK, Tortoise Media, and PA Media. The organisation is an independently registered educational charity.

== History ==
Demos was founded in 1993 by former Marxism Today editor Martin Jacques, and Geoff Mulgan, who became its first director. It was formed in response to what Mulgan, Jacques and others saw as a crisis in politics in Britain, with voter engagement in decline and political institutions unable in their view to adapt to major social changes. Demos was conceived as a network of networks which could draw together different sources of ideas and expertise to improve public policy.

In the run-up to the 1997 general election it was seen as being close to the Labour Party, in particular its then leader Tony Blair. It defines itself, however, as independent of any political party. Geoff Mulgan went on to work inside Downing Street in 1997. At that time Demos was seen as central to New Labour's vision for Britain.

Between 1998 and 2006, under Director Tom Bentley, it moved away from being just a think tank and an increasing part of its workload was described as 'public interest consultancy'.

On 9 August 2006, in a speech at a Demos conference, British Home Secretary Dr John Reid stated that Britons 'may have to modify their notion of freedom', as a result of his plans, claiming that freedom is 'misused and abused by terrorists'.

Over the summer of 2008, Demos cut back its workforce (from 23 full-time staff in January 2008 to 17 by September 2008) and did not attend any political party conferences, leading to speculation that it was in financial difficulty.

In 2010, David Cameron, then leader of the opposition Conservative Party, launched Demos's Character Inquiry, giving a speech on the importance of parenting and early years support.

Following his appointment in 2010, as Special Adviser to the Deputy Prime Minister, Nick Clegg, Richard Reeves stepped down as Demos's Director and was replaced by former Economic Secretary to the Treasury Kitty Ussher. She left Demos in 2012, with David Goodhart taking over as director. In 2011 Ben Rogers created Centre for London within Demos, before establishing it as an independent registered charity in 2013.

In January 2012, Demos set up the Centre for the Analysis of Social Media (CASM) to research trends in social media, and the role online conversations can play in political engagement and social policy research. CASM lead digital media monitoring for the 2015 British Election and focuses on how the rise of the digital world affects politics, policy and decision-making.

In January 2014, Claudia Wood became Demos's Chief Executive. She joined Demos in 2009, after leading policy in other UK think tanks and in Tony Blair's strategy unit.

Polly Mackenzie joined Demos as the new Director in January 2018. She previously worked for Nick Clegg from 2006 to 2015, helping to write the 2010 Coalition Agreement, and served as Director of Policy to the Deputy Prime Minister from 2010 to 2015.

=== List of Directors and Chief Executives ===
Director/Chief Executive	Years active
Polly Curtis	2022-present
Polly Mackenzie	2018–2022
Claudia Wood	2014–2018
David Goodhart	2012–2014
Kitty Ussher	2010–2012
Richard Reeves	2008–2010
Catherine Fieschi	2007–2008
Madeleine Bunting	2007
Tom Bentley	1998–2006
Geoff Mulgan	1993–1997

== Research ==
Demos is a member of the British Polling Council and a company partner of the Market Research Society. They are the only think tank in the UK using Pol.is, an online tool used to gather open-ended feedback from large groups of people, for the purposes of policy development. They also conduct social listening through Method 52, their in-house social media analysis technology developed in partnership with the University of Sussex.

Demos historically published a quarterly journal, titled Demos Quarterly, which features articles from politicians, academics and Demos researchers.

=== Centre of the Analysis of Social Media ===
The Centre for the Analysis of Social Media (CASM) is a collaboration between Demos and the Text Analytics Group at the University of Sussex, using social media research to gain insight and understanding on political, social and policy issues.

The current Director of CASM is Alex Krasodomski-Jones. Previous Directors include Jamie Bartlett and Carl Miller.

== Key people ==
Role	Name
Interim Chief Executive	Polly Curtis
Chair of Trustees	Julie Mellor
Head of Research	Harry Carr
Director, Centre for the Analysis of Social Media	Alex Krasodomski-Jones
Director of External Affairs	Maeve Thompson
Director of Operations	Heather Williams-Taplin
Research Director, Centre for the Analysis of Social Media	Carl Miller
Senior Fellow	Charles Seaford

Director of Policy Lucy Bush Chief Financial Officer Tom Bulgarelli

== Funding ==
Demos has been rated as 'broadly transparent' in its funding by Transparify. In September 2023 the funding transparency website Who Funds You? gave Demos a B grade, because Demos displays funding information on its own website, names its funders and declares *some* of the amounts given.

== See also ==
- List of think tanks in the United Kingdom
