= Tom Bentley =

British political advisor

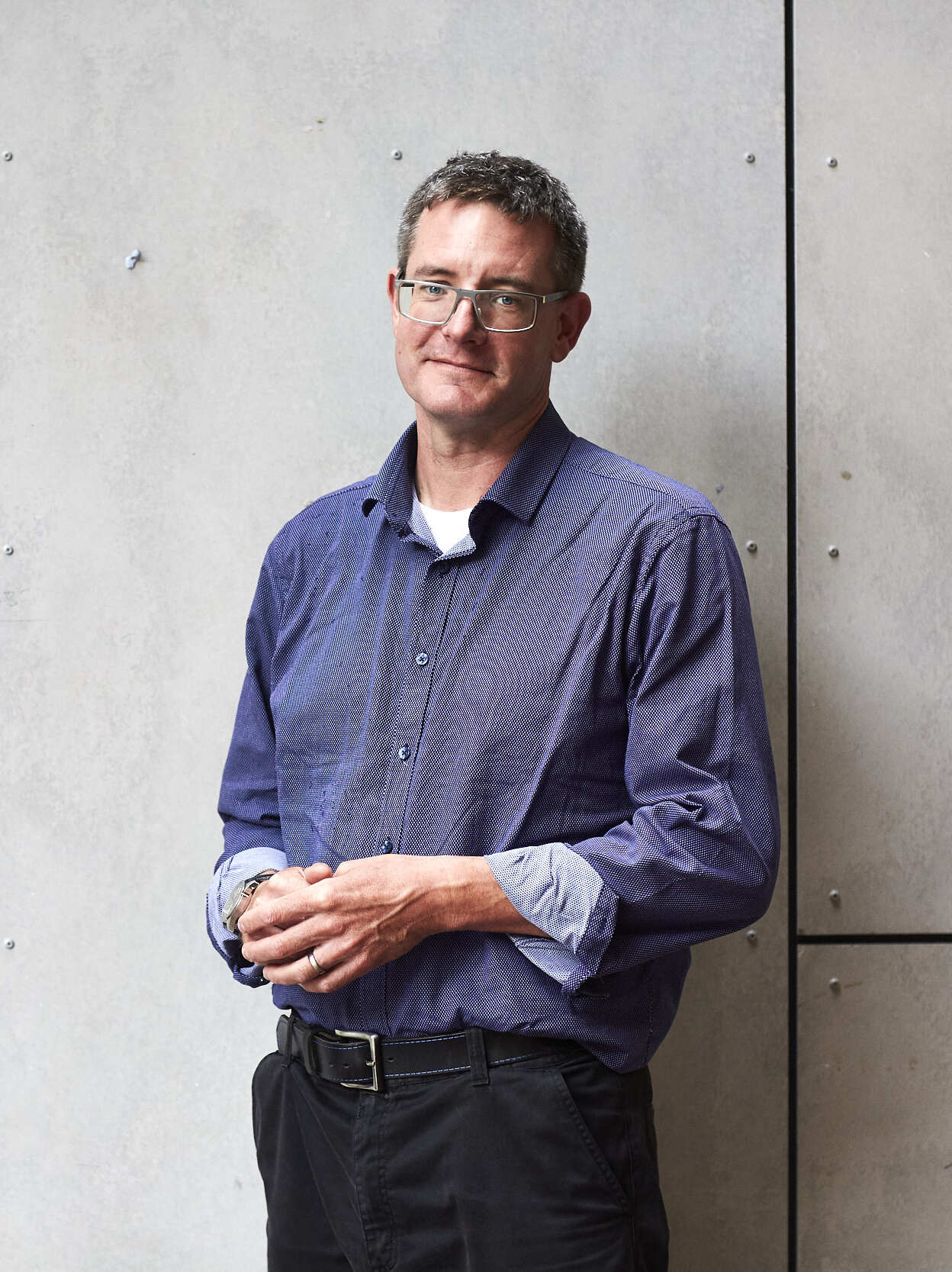
Tom Bentley

Tom Bentley is an author and policy analyst based in Australia. Bentley was born and educated in the United Kingdom, where he gained a Bachelor of Arts degree in Politics, Philosophy and Economics from the University of Oxford.

Bentley was formerly executive director for policy and cabinet for the Premier of Victoria, Australia, and was then deputy chief of staff to Prime Minister Julia Gillard and part-time director of the Australia and New Zealand School of Government. Between 1998 and 2006 he was director of DEMOS - described by The Economist as ‘Britain's most influential think tank'. Prior to his role at Demos he was a special adviser to David Blunkett MP, then Secretary of State for Education and Employment, where he worked on issues including school curriculum reform, social inclusion, creativity, citizenship, adult skills and area-based regeneration. He has been a trustee and chair of the Learning Programme for the National Endowment for Science, Technology and the Arts (NESTA) and a trustee of the Community Action Network in London.

Bentley has been a regular contributor to The Guardian, The Observer, the Financial Times and the New Statesman as well as regularly being interviewed for print and broadcast media.

== Publications ==
- Learning beyond the classroom: education for a changing world (Routledge, 1998), ISBN 978-0415182591
- The Creative Age: knowledge and skills for a new economy (Demos, 1999), ISBN 978-1898309703
- Letting go: complexity, individualism and the left (Renewal, 2002),
- The Adaptive State: strategies for personalising the public realm (Demos 2003), ISBN 978-1841801155
- People Flow (co-authors Alessandra Buonfino, Theo Veenkamp, Demos 2003) ISBN 1841801089 online
- Everyday Democracy: why we get the politicians we deserve (Demos, 2005) ISBN 978-1841801469
