= Michael Jacobs (economist) =

English economist

- Born: 3 December 1960 (age 65); London, England
- Occupation: Economist

Michael Jacobs (born 3 December 1960) is an English economist. He is a professorial research fellow at the Sheffield Political Economy Research Institute at the University of Sheffield. He was previously a special adviser to former UK Prime Minister Gordon Brown, Co-Editor of The Political Quarterly, in charge of the full-time staff of five at the Fabian Society, director of the Commission on Economic Justice at the Institute for Public Policy Research and a visiting professor in the Department of Political Science and School of Public Policy, University College London.

Jacobs' published work has ranged across environmental and climate change economics, social democratic and green political thought, and a variety of issues in public policy, particularly economic policy. His books include The Green Economy (1991), The Politics of the Real World (1996), Paying for Progress (2000), and Rethinking Capitalism (co-edited with Mariana Mazzucato, 2016).

== Education and early career ==
Born in London in 1960, Jacobs was educated in state schools in Barnet, North London, and at Wadham College, Oxford, where he gained a First in Politics, Philosophy and Economics. After university he became a community worker and adult educator before joining, and later becoming managing director of, CAG Consultants, an employee-owned consultancy firm specialising in local economic development. Working with central and local government in the early 1990s, Jacobs helped develop the field of local environmental auditing and management and the implementation of sustainable development principles in land use planning.

== Academic and political career ==
Jacobs's book The Green Economy: Environment, Sustainable Development and the Politics of the Future, published by Pluto Press in 1991, was an attempt to synthesise the relatively new fields of ecological and neoclassical environmental economics. Rejecting both the ‘green’ argument that environmental protection requires zero growth and the neoclassical approach of pricing environmental goods, the book argued for an essentially social-democratic system of ‘sustainability planning’. In this the state would use a variety of policy instruments, including taxation and regulation, to constrain the economy within biophysically-informed and publicly-decided environmental limits.

After joining the Centre for the Study of Environmental Change at Lancaster University in 1994, Jacobs published a series of papers on the philosophy of sustainable development and environmental economics and the politics of environmental policy. He edited a book of essays for the Political Quarterly on the latter subject, Greening the Millennium? The New Politics of the Environment (1997). From 1993 to 1996 Jacobs helped to found and co-ordinate the 'Real World Coalition' of NGOs in the environment, development, poverty and democracy fields, for whom he wrote a short book setting out an alternative agenda for British politics, The Politics of the Real World (Earthscan 1996).

In 1997, just after the formation of the new Labour Government, Jacobs was appointed General Secretary of the Fabian Society, the UK's longstanding left of centre think tank. Amongst other activities he established the Fabian Commission on Taxation and Citizenship, for which he wrote the report, Paying for Progress: A New Politics of Tax for Public Spending (Fabian Society 2000). The report argued for a hypothecated income tax to fund the National Health Service, and was perceived as influencing Chancellor of the Exchequer Gordon Brown's 2002 Budget, which raised National Insurance contributions and earmarked the revenue for the NHS. Jacobs' other writing at the Fabians included the pamphlets Environmental Modernisation: The New Labour Agenda (Fabian Society, 1999), and the report of the Fabian Commission on The Future of the Monarchy (Fabian Society 2003).

In January 2004 Jacobs was appointed a member of the Council of Economic Advisers at the UK Treasury, responsible for advising the Chancellor on environmental, health and public services policy and spending. While at the Treasury he originated the influential Stern Review and Report on the economics of climate change.

When Gordon Brown became prime minister in June 2007 Jacobs became a special adviser in the No 10 Policy Unit. From 2007 to 2010 he played a central role in the radical overhaul of the UK's climate and energy policy including the 2008 Climate Change Act, the creation of the Department of Energy and Climate Change, the 2009 Low Carbon Transition Plan, Renewable Energy Strategy and Low Carbon Industrial Strategy. He helped direct the UK's international climate strategy and was a key figure in the negotiations leading up to and at the UN climate conference in Copenhagen in December 2009.

After leaving government in May 2010, Jacobs was made a visiting professor in the Department of Political Science and School of Public Policy at University College London. He became co-editor of The Political Quarterly (2012–14) and wrote on the relationship between left and green political thought. He was also appointed visiting professor in the Grantham Research Institute on Climate Change and the Environment at the London School of Economics, where his research looked at the discourse of 'green growth'.

From 2012 to 2015 his work increasingly focused on securing a new international climate change agreement, initially with the philanthropic Children's Investment Fund Foundation then at l'Institut du Développement Durable et des Relations Internationales (IDDRI) in Paris, and through the Global Commission on the Economy and Climate, which he helped to found. He advised the French and UK governments, the UN Secretary-General's office and a network of non-governmental and business organisations on strategy for the UN climate conference in Paris which took place in December 2015. He was a lead author of the Global Commission's report Better Growth, Better Climate, published in September 2014, which was widely seen as influencing debate on the compatibility of economic development and climate action. He directed its second report, Seizing the Global Opportunity: Partnerships for Better Growth and a Better Climate, published in July 2015.

Michael Jacobs' book Rethinking Capitalism: Economics and Policy for Sustainable and Inclusive Growth, co-edited with Mariana Mazzucato, was published in August 2016. The book brings together essays by a number of leading economists challenging orthodox economic theory and policy. Jacobs' and Mazzucato's introductory essay sets out the book's core thesis that to address the fundamental weaknesses of contemporary western capitalism a more pluralist approach to economic theory and policy is required, drawing on evolutionary, institutional and post-Keynesian traditions.

After a short period as visiting fellow at the Institute for Public Policy Research, in October 2016 Jacobs was appointed director of the IPPR Commission on Economic Justice, a two-year programme to examine the challenges facing the UK economy and make recommendations for its reform.

In October 2018, Jacobs became professorial research fellow at the Sheffield Political Economy Research Institute at the University of Sheffield.
