= History of the Labour Party (UK) =

Aspect of British political history

National votes for Labour at general
elections since 1992 (millions)

England Wales Scotland

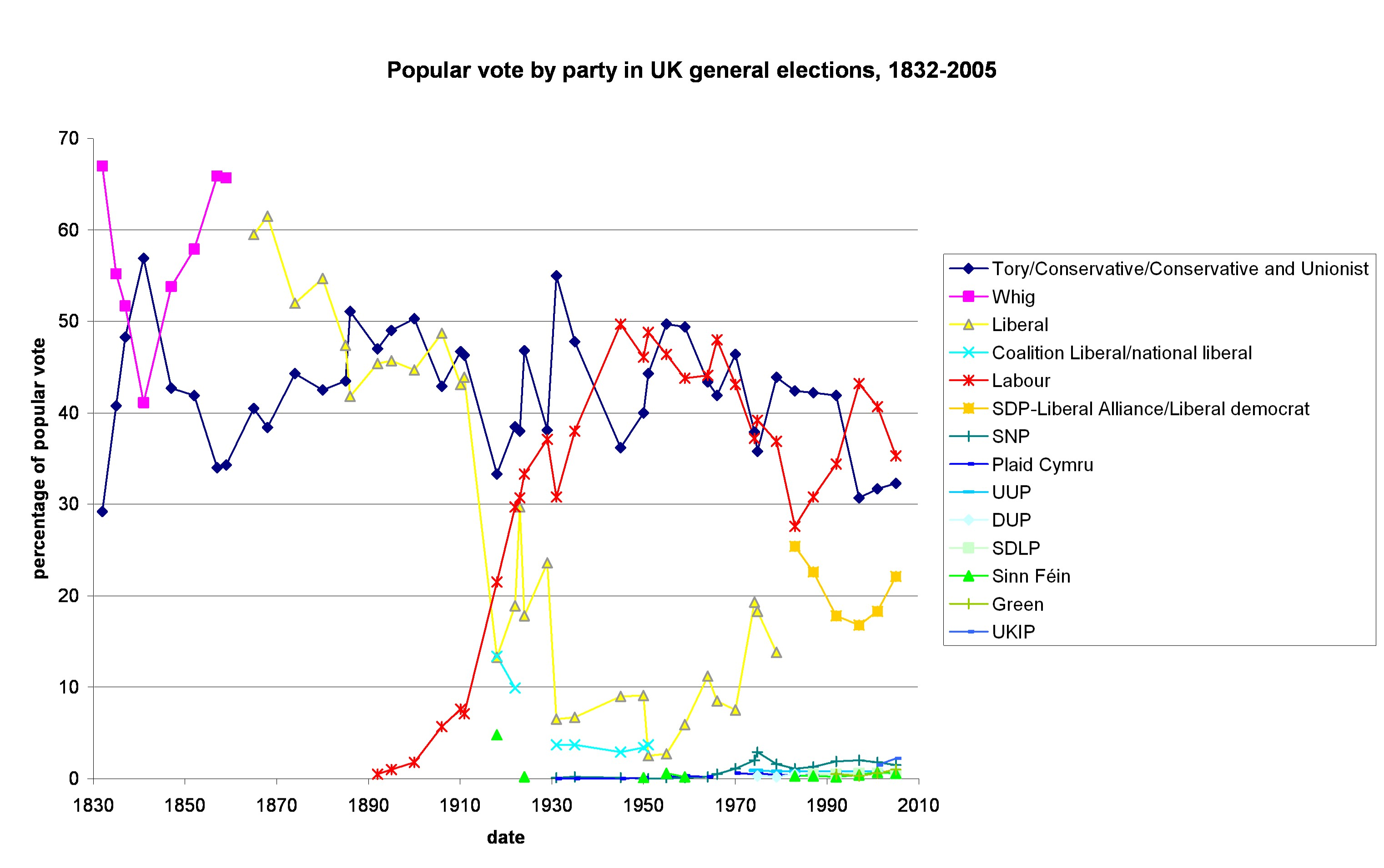
A graph showing the percentage of the popular vote received by major parties in general elections (1832–2005), with the rapid rise of the Labour Party after its founding during the late 19th century being clear as it became one of the two major forces in politics

The British Labour Party grew out of the trade union movement of the late 19th century and surpassed the Liberal Party as the main opposition to the Conservatives in the early 1920s. In the 1930s and 1940s, it stressed national planning, using nationalisation of industry as a tool, in line with Clause IV of the original constitution of the Labour Party which called for the "common ownership of the means of production, distribution, and exchange, and the best obtainable system of popular administration and control of each industry or service" (this clause was eventually revised in 1994).

Labour has had several spells in government, first as minority governments under Ramsay MacDonald in 1924 and 1929–1931. MacDonald and half his cabinet split with the mainstream of the party and were denounced as traitors. Labour was a junior partner in the wartime coalition from 1940 to 1945. Following the 1945 general election landslide under Clement Attlee (1945–1951) it set up the welfare state with the National Health Service, nationalised a fifth of the economy, joined NATO and opposed the Soviet Union in the Cold War. Under Harold Wilson in 1964–1970 it promoted economic modernisation. Labour was in government again in 1974–1979 under Wilson and then James Callaghan. Escalating economic crises (the "Winter of Discontent") and a split with David Owen and others forming the Social Democratic Party, resulted in opposition status during the Thatcher years from 1979 to 1990.

Labour returned with a 179-seat majority in the 1997 general election under the leadership of Tony Blair. The party's large majority in the House of Commons was slightly reduced to 167 in the 2001 general election and more substantially reduced to 66 in the 2005 general election. Under Gordon Brown, it was defeated in the 2010 general election, becoming the opposition to a Conservative/Liberal-Democrat coalition. The party remained in opposition until Keir Starmer won a landslide victory for Labour in the 2024 general election, returning Labour to government.

== Founding of the party ==
=== Background ===
The Labour Party's origins lie in the growth of the urban proletariat in the late 19th century and the extension of the franchise to working class males, when it became apparent that there was a need for a political party to represent the interests and needs of those groups. Some members of the trade union movement became interested in moving into the political field, and after the extensions of the franchise in 1867 and 1885, the Liberal Party endorsed some trade-union sponsored candidates. In addition, several small socialist groups had formed around this time with the intention of linking the movement to political policies. Among these were the Independent Labour Party, the intellectual and largely middle-class Fabian Society, the Social Democratic Federation and the Scottish Labour Party.

In 1892, Fred Jowett (a member of the Independent Labour Party) became the first socialist to be elected to Bradford City Council. A few months later, Jowett founded a branch of the Independent Labour Party in that city. As a member of Bradford City Council, Jowett was responsible for the passage of several important reforms that were eventually adopted by other local authorities. In 1904, for instance, Bradford became the first local authority in Britain to provide free school meals, while a successful campaign led to the clearing of a slum area and its replacement with new houses. Jowett was also a supporter of reforming the Poor Law Amendment Act 1834, and attempted to improve the quality of the food given to the children in the Bradford Workhouse after being elected as a Poor Law Guardian.

In 1898, West Ham became the first borough council in Britain to have a socialist and labour majority. The new administration embarked on a programme involving the enlargement of the municipal workforce and bringing it directly under public control in order to improve job security, conditions, and pay for workers. A minimum wage and an eight-hour workday were introduced for council employees, together with a fortnight's annual holiday. Although Labour lost its majority two years later, its achievements in the council demonstrated Labour's effectiveness at instigating reform at a municipal level. The Women's Labour League, which was active in the field of social policy, set up a child welfare clinic in Kensington before the outbreak of World War I.

In the 1895 General Election the Independent Labour Party put up 28 candidates but won only 44,325 votes. Keir Hardie, the leader of the party believed that to obtain success in parliamentary elections, it would be necessary to join with other left-wing groups.

=== Labour Representation Committee ===
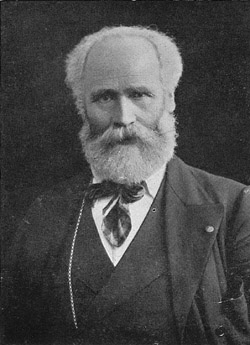
Keir Hardie, one of the Labour Party's founders and its first leader

In 1899, a Doncaster member of the Amalgamated Society of Railway Servants, Thomas R. Steels, proposed in his union branch that the Trades Union Congress call a special conference to bring together all left-wing organisations and form them into a single body that would sponsor Parliamentary candidates. The motion was passed at all stages by the TUC, and the proposed conference was held at the Congregational Memorial Hall on Farringdon Street, London on 26 and 27 February 1900. The meeting was attended by a broad spectrum of working-class and left-wing organisations — trades unions represented about one third of the membership of the TUC delegates.

Following a debate, the 129 delegates passed Hardie's motion to establish "a distinct Labour group in Parliament, who shall have their own whips, and agree upon their policy, which must embrace a readiness to cooperate with any party which for the time being may be engaged in promoting legislation in the direct interests of labour". This created an association called the Labour Representation Committee (LRC), meant to coordinate attempts to support MPs sponsored by trades unions and represent the working-class population. It had no single leader, and in the absence of one, the Independent Labour Party nominee Ramsay MacDonald was elected as Secretary. He had the difficult task of keeping the various strands of opinions in the LRC united. The October 1900 "Khaki election" came too soon for the new party to campaign effectively; total expenses for the election only came to £33. Only 15 candidatures were sponsored, but two were successful; Keir Hardie in Merthyr Tydfil and Richard Bell in Derby.

Support for the LRC was boosted by the 1901 Taff Vale Case, a dispute between strikers and a railway company that ended with the union being ordered to pay £23,000 damages for a strike. The judgment effectively made strikes illegal since employers could recoup the cost of lost business from the unions. The apparent acquiescence of the Conservative Government of Arthur Balfour to industrial and business interests (traditionally the allies of the Liberal Party in opposition to the Conservative's landed interests) intensified support for the LRC against a government that appeared to have little concern for the industrial proletariat and its problems.

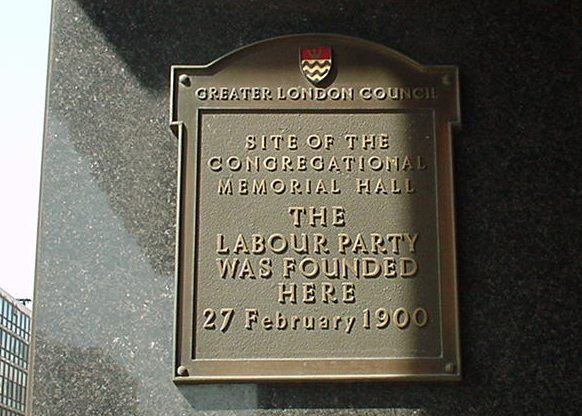
Labour Party plaque from Caroone House, 14 Farringdon Street

=== Rise of the Labour Party ===
In the 1906 election, the LRC won 29 seats—helped by the secret 1903 pact between Ramsay MacDonald and Liberal Chief Whip Herbert Gladstone that aimed to avoid splitting the opposition vote between Labour and Liberal candidates in the interest of removing the Conservatives from office.

In their first meeting after the election the group's Members of Parliament decided to adopt the name "The Labour Party" formally (15 February 1906). Keir Hardie, who had taken a leading role in getting the party established, was elected as Chairman of the Parliamentary Labour Party (in effect, the Leader), although only by one vote over David Shackleton after several ballots. In the party's early years the Independent Labour Party (ILP) provided much of its activist base as the party did not have individual membership until 1918 but operated as a conglomerate of affiliated bodies. The Fabian Society provided much of the intellectual stimulus for the party. One of the first acts of the new Liberal Government was to reverse the Taff Vale judgement, while Labour parliamentarians encouraged and supported progressive measures such as the Workmen's Compensation Act 1906, the Coal Mines Regulation Act 1908, the Old Age Pensions Act 1908, and compulsory medical inspections in state schools. In 1906, the Labour Party scored its first ever legislative success in the new Parliament with the passage of a bill put forward by the Labour MP William Tyson Wilson in the form of the Education (Provision of Meals) Act 1906. In a symbolic move, in regards to provisions for retirement, Labour MP James O'Grady moved a resolution on the 14th of March 1906 calling for the urgent need to provide universal old age pensions; a resolution that was passed without a division.

The design of several of the Liberal welfare reforms was influenced to some extent by Labour. For instance, as the Education (Provision of Meals) Act 1906 was only permissive, the Labour Party put forward an amending Act under which local authorities (as noted by one study) “would be required to provide meals if a medical report showed a child’s need, and to have medical inspectors making periodical examinations and regular reports.” The Act failed to pass, although it resulted in a circular that permitted local authorities to arrange for schoolchildren to have medical inspections and also to set up treatment centres. In regards to the Merchant Shipping Act 1906, a Labour member’s proposal for a clause to require all ships that were over 2,000 tons to have a certified ship’s carpenter. The member received a promise (as noted by one observer) “of an investigation and of action by the Board of Trade if this provision should be shown to be necessary to prevent accident or loss of life.” In addition, a Labour Party resolution from March 1906 that called upon the government to pay its employees in national dockyards standard union wage rates won (as one study has noted) “an official promise of compliance” while a similar resolution from June that year concerning government employees in the Woolwich Arsenal “was similarly received” as one observer has noted.

Regarding the bill that led to the passage of the Workmen's Compensation Act 1906, a number of Labour amendments were accepted, such as one under which workmen would be guaranteed the minimum scale of compensation under the Act even if they had contracted out, along with another Labour amendment under which illegitimate children would be brought under the Act either (as noted by one study) “as dependents of the workman involved, or as workmen claiming for parents or grandparents.” Labour also influenced the content of the Trade Disputes Act 1906 and had some influence on the Old Age Pensions Act 1908, with Lloyd George (in response to a proposal from George Barnes) removing a provision that would have (as one study has noted) “given a couple living together, not the full five shillings each, but three shillings and nine pence instead.” In addition, Labour has been credited with playing a part in the passage of the Trade Boards Act 1909, due to the Labour party having taken charge after 1906 of a bill that had been forward by Sir Charles Dilke providing for a minimum wage in the sweated trades. In 1914, as a result of Labour pressure, an effort was made by the government to provide support to local authorities financially providing school dinners. That year, Fred Jowett put forward a Child Feeding Bill that was passed into law as the Elementary Education (Provision of Meals) Act that increased the expenditure limit on school meals and also legalised (as noted by one study) “the provision of meals during holidays and other days when the schools were not open.” Labour also successfully pressured the government into voting £200,000 in support of relief works to help those who didn’t have work, and influenced the Education (Administrative Provisions) Act 1907, and the Coal Mines Regulation Act 1908 (which established an eight-hour day for coal miners) together with a remodelling of a Fair Wages Clause in government contracts.

Labour's influence in the passage of many of the Liberal welfare reforms was the result of an informal Labour-Liberal alliance that was established in the run up to the general election of 1906. The Labour and Liberal parties reached agreement to accommodate each other's candidates. The Liberals, who were eager to cut deadweight electoral losses to the Conservatives, arrived at a list of 30 constituencies in which they would "stand down", thereby giving the LRC free run against Conservatives in exchange for some sway over LRC campaign planks. Winning 25 out of the 30 seats in question, Labour helped H. H. Asquith's government pass Britain's first national pension law in 1908 and, after extended collaboration in the election of 1910, the National Insurance Act 1911 providing National Insurance for both health and unemployment. Throughout the Liberal administrations, as one study has noted, “the Labour Party leaders were frequently consulted on the drafting and organization of the various social reforms, and they made an important contribution in this respect.”

The alliance with the Liberals was a temporary arrangement until the 1920s, when the Labour Party was strong enough to act on its own, and the Liberals were in an irreversible decline. The causes were subtle social changes in the working class that produced the younger generation that wanted to act independently. Michael Childs argues that the younger generation had reason to prefer Labour over Liberal political styles. Social factors included secularised elementary education (with a lesser role for Dissenting Protestantism); the "New Unionism" after 1890 brought unskilled workers into a movement previously dominated by the skilled workers; and new leisure-time activities, especially the music hall and sports, enthralled youth while repelling the older generation of Liberal voters. Childs notes that the 1918 electoral reforms added many young working-class voters, and the passing of older Liberal-oriented age cohorts during the 1920s enabled Labour to supplant the Liberals.

The 1910 election saw 42 Labour MPs elected to the House of Commons, a significant victory since, a year before the election, the House of Lords had passed the Osborne judgment ruling that Trades Unions in the United Kingdom could no longer donate money to fund the election campaigns and wages of Labour MPs. The governing Liberals were unwilling to repeal this judicial decision with primary legislation. The height of Liberal compromise was to introduce a wage for Members of Parliament to remove the need to involve the Trade Unions. By 1913, faced with the opposition of the largest Trades Unions, the Liberal government passed the Trade Disputes Act to allow Trade Unions to fund Labour MPs once more.

By 1914, there were about 420 Labour representatives sitting on municipal Councils of various kinds, not including a few County councilors in the mining areas, or a much larger number on Boards of Guardians, Parish Councils, and District Councils. Aside from education, and the feeding and medical inspection and treatment of schoolchildren, the issues which the Labour Party pressed most urgently in local government were the local provision of work for the unemployed, the eight-hour workday, the adoption and enforcement of the Fair Wages Clause in public contracts, and fair wages and conditions for local authority employees. In some areas (particularly Birmingham and Glasgow) there was active pressure in support of municipal housing and slum clearance schemes, while there was also continued agitation (in relation to the Board of guardians) for improved treatment both of the unemployed and other classes of paupers, particularly the disabled and the aged. Housebuilding, midway between a public health service and a trading enterprise, became one of the main planks in the Labour municipal platform.

=== World War I ===
World War I marked the break through for the party, as the Liberals declined sharply and Labour moved into second place behind the Conservatives. Historian Andrew Thorpe argues that "Labour's ability to make so much of the opportunities offered by the war was due, mainly, the parties basic underlying unity during the conflict." Before the war the party was officially committed to the antiwar argument that capitalism caused warfare. However, the German invasion of Belgium and the surge of pro-war attitudes among the membership of the party led increasingly to support of British entry into the war. Ramsay MacDonald continued to oppose the war, but he quickly resigned as party leader and was replaced by Arthur Henderson, who was strongly committed to defeating the German Empire. In 1915, the Labour Party gained ministerial office for the first time when Henderson was invited to join Asquith's wartime government. Asquith wanted the co-operation of the trade union movement to greatly expand munitions production. Henderson became President of the Board of Education and served as adviser to Asquith on labour issues. Minor positions were given to G. H. Roberts and William Bruce. In December 1916, when Asquith was replaced by David Lloyd George, more Labour leaders were included in more important positions. Henderson was promoted to the inner war cabinet, while George Barnes of the engineers became Minister of Pensions and John Hodge of the steel workers became Minister of Labour. William Bruce, G. H. Roberts, and James Parker (another Labour MP) took minor posts.

Despite mainstream Labour Party's support for the war effort, the Independent Labour Party was instrumental in opposing conscription through organisations such as the Non-Conscription Fellowship while a Labour Party affiliate, the British Socialist Party, organised a number of unofficial strikes. Arthur Henderson resigned from the Cabinet in 1917 amid calls for party unity to be replaced by George Barnes. Overall, however, the majority of the movement continued to support the war for the duration of the conflict, and the British Labour Party, unlike most of its equivalents in Continental Europe, did not split over the war.

During the course of the First World War, while serving both inside and outside of government, the Labour Party was able to influence a number of progressive developments in social policy. At a time when 90% of housing was privately rented, landlords sought to increase rents in the face of rising wartime prices (and in some cases as a means of profiteering). This resulted in a range of largely spontaneous protests in 1915 which were then often co-ordinated by local Labour movements, such as that in Glasgow, where the ILP played a leading role. This forced the government to pass legislation which fixed wartime rents at pre-war levels. This was significant in that it showed labour to be the party that would defend working-class interests in housing, more than its rivals, while also helping Labour to move away from trade union related issues towards areas which had some direct appeal to women, in particular. In addition, as argued by Andrew Thorpe, it also "added credibility to the idea of state action to control market forces which disadvantaged the working class."

The Labour Party also campaigned for "fair shares," attacking profiteering and unrestricted market forces, and secured some advances by applying pressure on the government. The Labour Party pushed hard for high taxation of war profits, rationing, and other controls, and in 1917 with J. R. Clynes at the Food Commission and in 1918 as Controller, price controls were introduced which stabilised food prices, while rationing, which came into operation at the beginning of 1918, ensuring a real degree of "fair play." An excess profits duty was also introduced in 1915 which stood at 80% by 1917, and Labour's credentials were further established by the WEC's "Conscription of Riches" campaign, launched in 1916.

Since 'fair play' was one of the great traditions of British radicalism, it was clearly to Labour's advantage to push in this direction, and the fact that such policies could be implemented greatly enhanced labour's general credibility.

— Andrew Thorpe, A History of The British Labour Party

The wartime experience of the Labour ministers made them feel more confident of their party's ability to use the machinery of state to bring about social change, and encouraged them to resist policies of "direct action" urged by local Soviets and the fledgling Communist Party of Great Britain. However, at the 1918 Labour Party Conference, the Party adopted Clause IV into its constitution, which had been drafted by Sidney Webb the year previously, and which called for "the common ownership of the means of production, distribution and exchange."

Prior to 1918, the Labour Party had been an ideologically diverse party. This was demonstrated by the parliamentary makeup of the Labour Party following the 1906 United Kingdom general election. Out of the 29 Labour Party members of parliament, 21 were socialists while 8 were non-socialists. With the adoption of the new constitution in 1918, however, Labour officially became a socialist party.

The growth in Labour's local activist base and organisation was reflected in the elections following the war, the co-operative movement now providing its own resources to the Co-operative Party after the armistice. The Co-operative Party later reached an electoral agreement with the Labour Party. The Communist Party of Great Britain was refused affiliation between 1921 and 1923. Meanwhile, the Liberal Party declined rapidly and the party suffered a catastrophic split that allowed the Labour Party to co-opt much of the Liberals' support.

With the Liberals in disarray Labour won 142 seats in 1922, making it the second largest political group in the House of Commons and the official opposition to the Conservative government. After the election the now-rehabilitated Ramsay MacDonald was voted the first official leader of the Labour Party.

Progress continued in local government. In 1919 John Adams (later Baron Adams of Ennerdale) led a successful election challenge to the sitting members of Arlecdon and Frizington District Council in Cumberland. This established the first all-Labour local council to be elected in England.

Elections for the Women's Sections were carried out by postal ballot in 1931. They resulted in the appointment of Clarice Shaw, Ald. Rose Davies, Mrs. Hyde and Jessie Stephen.

== First Labour governments under Ramsay MacDonald ==
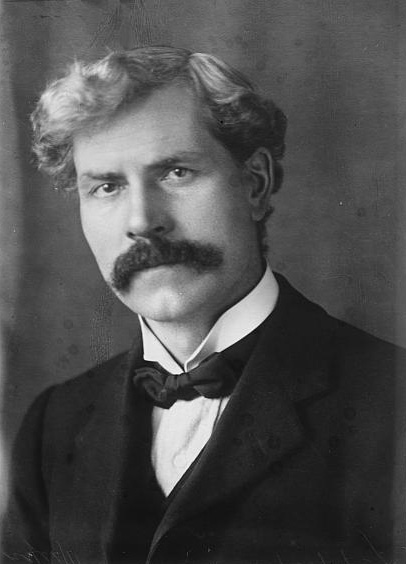
Ramsay MacDonald, the first Labour Prime Minister, 1924, 1929–1935 (National from 1931 to 1935)

=== First Labour government ===
The 1923 general election was fought on the Conservatives' protectionist proposals; although they got the most votes and remained the largest party, they lost their majority in parliament, requiring a government supporting free trade to be formed. So with the acquiescence of Asquith's Liberals, Ramsay MacDonald became prime minister in January 1924 and formed the first ever Labour government, despite Labour only having 191 MPs (less than a third of the House of Commons).

The most significant measure introduced by the first Labour government was the Wheatley Housing Act which began a building programme of 500,000 homes for rent to working-class families. However, because the government had to rely on the support of the Liberals it was unable to implement many of its more contentious policies such as nationalisation of the coal industry, or a capital levy. Although no radical changes were introduced, Labour demonstrated that they were capable of governing.

The government collapsed after only nine months when the Liberals voted for a Select Committee inquiry into the Campbell Case, a vote which MacDonald had declared to be a vote of confidence. The ensuing general election saw the publication, four days before polling day, of the hoaxed Zinoviev letter, which implicated Labour in a plot for a Communist revolution in Britain, and the Conservatives were returned to power, although Labour increased its vote from 30.7% of the popular vote to a third of the popular vote—most of the Conservative gains were at the expense of the Liberals. The Zinoviev letter is now generally believed to have been a forgery.

=== General strike ===
The new Conservative government led by Stanley Baldwin took decisive control of the general strike of 1926, ending it in nine days by bringing in middle-class strikebreakers and averting violence. Ramsay MacDonald continued with his policy of opposing strike action, including the general strike, arguing that the best way to achieve social reforms was through the ballot box. Labour deeply distrusted the media and lost heavily in the court of public opinion formed by a hostile press. They learned a lesson and switched to a policy of deliberate media engagement, notably with the BBC, which proved successful in the long run.

=== Second Labour government ===
The election of May 1929 left the Labour Party for the first time as the largest grouping in the House of Commons with 287 seats, and 37.1% of the popular vote (actually slightly less than the Conservatives). However, MacDonald was still reliant on Liberal support to form a minority government. MacDonald's government included the first ever woman cabinet minister Margaret Bondfield who was appointed Minister of Labour.

MacDonald's second government was in a stronger parliamentary position than his first, and was able to carry out a wide range of progressive reforms. In 1930, for instance, it was able to pass a revised Old Age Pensions Act, a more generous Unemployment Insurance Act, and an act to improve wages and conditions in the coal industry (i.e. the issues behind the General Strike). Under the Coal Mines Act 1930, for instance, marketing schemes for output and price regulation were set up, while a commission was appointed to promote schemes of unification. Minimum wages and subsistence allowances were fixed for one year, while measures for miner's safety were increased and improved. The Pensions Act 1929 granted pensions to over 500,000 children, old people, and widows who had previously been excluded from the pensions system. The Housing (Scotland) Act 1930 (20 & 21 Geo. 5. c. 40) and the Housing Act 1930 (20 & 21 Geo. 5. c. 39) provided local authorities with additional central government subsidies to construct new homes for people who had been moved out of slum clearance areas. The Housing Act 1930 provided for rehousing in advance of demolition, and also for the charging of low rents. The act also made state aid available for the first time for building little houses for older people without families. An obligation was put onto county councils to contribute towards houses built for farm workers, while provisions in the act for improving bad housing and clearing slums were applied to the country districts as well as to urban areas.

==== Great Depression and the split under MacDonald ====
The Wall Street crash of 1929 and eventual Great Depression occurred soon after the government came to power, and the crisis hit Britain hard. By the end of 1930 the unemployment rate had doubled to over two and a half million.

The Labour government struggled to cope with the crisis and found itself attempting to reconcile two contradictory aims; achieving a balanced budget in order to maintain the pound on the Gold Standard, whilst also trying to maintain assistance to the poor and unemployed. All of this whilst tax revenues were falling. The Chancellor of the Exchequer, Philip Snowden refused to permit deficit spending.

One junior minister, Oswald Mosley, put forward a memorandum in January 1930, calling for the public control of imports and banking as well as an increase in pensions to boost spending power. When this was repeatedly turned down, Mosley resigned from the government in February 1931 and went on to form the New Party, and later the British Union of Fascists after he converted to Fascism.

By 1931 the situation had deteriorated further. Under pressure from its Liberal allies as well as the Conservative opposition who feared that the budget was unbalanced, the Labour government appointed a committee headed by Sir George May to review the state of public finances. The May Report of July 1931 urged public-sector wage cuts and large cuts in public spending (notably in payments to the unemployed) in order to avoid a budget deficit.

This proposal proved deeply unpopular within the Labour Party grass roots and the trade unions, which along with several government ministers, refused to support any such measures. Several senior ministers such as Arthur Henderson and J. R. Clynes threatened to resign rather than agree to the cuts. MacDonald, and Philip Snowden however, insisted that the Report's recommendations must be adopted to avoid incurring a budget deficit.

The dispute over spending and wage cuts split the Labour government; as it turned out, fatally. The cabinet repeatedly failed to agree to make cuts to spending or introduce tariffs. The resulting political deadlock caused investors to take fright, and a flight of capital and gold further de-stabilised the economy. In response, MacDonald, on the urging of the king agreed to form a National Government, with the Conservatives and the small group of Liberals. On 24 August 1931 MacDonald submitted the resignation of his ministers and led a small number of his senior colleagues, most notably Snowden and Dominions Secretary J. H. Thomas, in forming the National Government with the other parties. MacDonald and his supporters were then expelled from the Labour Party and formed the National Labour Organisation. The remaining Labour Party, now led by Arthur Henderson, went into opposition (as did a few Liberals). The resulting 1931 election resulted in a landslide victory for the National Government, and was a disaster for the Labour Party which won only 52 seats, 225 fewer than in 1929.

MacDonald continued as Prime Minister of the Conservative dominated National Government until 1935. MacDonald was vehemently denounced by the Labour Party as a "traitor" and a "rat" for what they saw as his betrayal.

== Moving left in 1930s ==
Arthur Henderson, who had been elected in 1931 as Labour leader to succeed MacDonald, lost his seat in the 1931 General Election. The only former Labour cabinet member who survived the landslide was the pacifist George Lansbury, who accordingly became party leader.

The party experienced a further split in 1932 when the Independent Labour Party, which for some years had been increasingly at odds with the Labour leadership, opted to disaffiliate from the Labour Party. The ILP embarked on a long drawn out decline. The role of the ILP within the Labour Party was taken up for a time by the Socialist League, which operated inside the Labour Party and was led by Stafford Cripps, which attracted several thousand teachers and intellectuals. In 1937 when the Socialist League proposed a Popular Front coalition with Communist Party of Great Britain, the Labour Party closed it down.

=== Economics ===
The Labour Party moved to the left during the early 1930s. At the 1932 conference Somerville Hastings of the Socialist Medical Association moved a resolution, which was carried, calling for the establishment of a State Medical Service and in 1934 Conference unanimously accepted an official document on a National Health Service largely prepared by SMA members. The party's programme "For Socialism and Peace" adopted in 1934, committed the party to nationalisation of land, banking, coal, iron and steel, transport, power and water supply, as well as the setting up of a National Investment Board to plan industrial development. Harold Laski, a highly influential professor and pamphleteer began to argue that a peaceful, democratic transition to socialism was unlikely because the opposition would resort to violence, and Labour had to be prepared.

There was little innovation in party thinking on economic issues. "Planning" and "nationalisation" remained little more than slogans that Hugh Dalton, the chief economic spokesman, promised would create a new Jerusalem that left economic hardship behind. Party leader Attlee avoided economics. By contrast, the small surviving Liberal party had elaborate analyses and proposals thanks to its experts such as John Maynard Keynes and William Beveridge. When Labour came to power in 1945, it discovered there were no plans on how to conduct nationalisation. No preparation had been made for the shortages in coal that experts had warned was coming. Attlee and his fellow leaders based their postwar policies on wartime experiences.

=== Foreign policy ===
The Labour Party was badly divided in the 1930s. The pacifist faction opposing all warfare and British rearmament fought a faction that was willing to support a war provided it was done so under the auspices of the League of Nations to resist aggression.

Public disagreements between the pacifists led by Lansbury and most Party members were focused on Lansbury's opposition to applying sanctions against Italy for its aggression against Ethiopia (called Abyssinia at the time). See Abyssinia Crisis Lansbury had to resign. He was succeeded by his deputy, Clement Attlee, who achieved a revival in Labour's fortunes in the 1935 General Election, securing 154 seats and winning a similar number of votes to those attained in 1929 and actually, at 38% of the popular vote, the highest percentage that Labour had ever achieved. Mild, unassuming and modest Attlee was initially regarded as a weak caretaker leader. However his pragmatism, command of information, and brokering abilities made him highly effective in backstage negotiations and manoeuvres. Attlee became the longest serving party leader, and one of its most successful.

In 1936 the far left rallied to the support of the Soviet-supported Republican forces during the Spanish Civil War and against the threat from Nazi Germany and Fascist Italy in 1936 to 1938. The Spanish crisis discredited the once-dominant pacifist element. The Party now came out in favour of rearmament. This shift largely came about due to the efforts of Ernest Bevin and Hugh Dalton who by 1937 also persuaded the party to oppose Neville Chamberlain's policy of appeasement. The Sudetenland crisis of 1938 caused much internal tension in the Labour Party between its anti-war vs anti-fascist wings with some Labour MPs stating that it would amoral for Britain to go to war against Germany under the grounds that all wars were evil while other Labour MPs argued that Britain had a moral duty to defend Czechoslovakia should Germany invade. An internal memo in April 1938 for all Labour MPs and peers argued against support for Czechoslovakia under the grounds that it would cause a world war. However, as the Sudetenland crisis went along, Labour MPs increasingly framed the crisis of a struggle between a small, weak and democratic state, namely Czechoslovakia, that was being bullied by a large, strong and totalitarian state, namely Germany.

Labour achieved a number of by-election upsets in the later part of the 1930s despite the depression ending and unemployment falling. Nevertheless, they remained a small weak party in Parliament. By the time of the Danzig crisis in 1939, the anti-fascist wing of the Labour Party was in ascendency as Labour accepted the imposition of peacetime conscription by the Chamberlain government in May 1939 despite having previously vowed to oppose such a policy and urged the government to create the "peace front" to unite Britain, France and the Soviet Union in an alliance meant to deter Germany from invading Poland. In an attempt to soothe over the potential split represented by support for rearmament and peacetime conscription, Attlee and the other Labour leaders argued that such a strategy of deterrence via the "peace front" would prevent a war from occurring, and repeatedly criticised the Chamberlain government in the spring and summer of 1939 for not doing more to create the "peace front". The general Labour line in the Danzig crisis was broadly of support for the government, but at the same time being highly critical of the slow pace of Anglo-Soviet talks and urged the Chamberlain government to do more to conclude an alliance with the Soviet Union as soon as possible. As the Danzig crisis deepened in the summer of 1939 and the prospect of another world war became ominously real, Attlee and the other Labour leaders had to think seriously about what would be their policy in the event of war. The Labour line was that in the event of war was to form a coalition government with the Conservatives and the Liberals, but not one led by Chamberlain who had long been a bête noire for Labour.

== Local Labour reforms in the inter-war period ==
Although Labour remained out of national office for most of the inter-war period, it was able to control many local authorities and put its socialist principles into practice on a small scale.

The Labour-controlled local authorities, and also those in which Labour was the strongest single party, had in practice to concentrate mainly on making the most of the opportunities offered to them by national legislation – especially in the fields of housing, education, public health services, and, after 1929, the services transferred to them from the Boards of Guardians. In all these fields, Labour had a notably good local government record.

— G. D. H. Cole, A History of the Labour Party from 1914

During the inter-war period, Labour in local government sought to use the power of municipal authority to improve the working and living environments of its primarily working-class constituents. Participation in local government provided Labour Party members with experience in office, together with the opportunity to improve the living standards of its constituents through measures such as improvements in housing and health care, the provision of maternity clinics, and free milk and meals for schoolchildren Labour councillors elected in 1919 adopted a policy of municipal socialism (particularly in boroughs of London) to tackle social problems such as poor health, inadequate housing, and general insecurity. Labour in local government sought to establish a "proto-welfare state" through, for instance, the elected Boards of Guardians, paying more generous levels of poor relief to the jobless and encouraging the construction of clinics, houses, and municipal baths which, apart from providing necessary services, also provided employment opportunities. Also, although Labour groups often remained in a minority position in their councils, they and their supporters (as noted by one study) “mounted campaigns to safeguard and extend people's standard of living. Minority Labour groups could, for example, seek to block council initiatives deemed to be antithetical to the interests of their constituents.”

During the 1920s, Labour councillors forced the pace in local administration, whether in councils or (until their abolition in 1929) on boards of guardians. As noted by John Wheatley, "One of the brightest results of the growth of the Labour movement is that the control of the poor has been passed on into the hands of popular boards of guardians." In general, Labour councillors showed more willingness than others in pressing their legal powers to the limit and less concerned about the cost to the rates, and before the end of the 1930s, 60 local authorities were under the control of the Labour Party. In London, Labour politicians were able to influence a wide range of progressive social reforms in various metropolitan boroughs. Labour councils also acted as model employers, with various councils under Labour control providing employment opportunities and improved conditions for various workers.

=== Wales ===
The Labour Party also enjoyed a strong following in Wales, where in the 1935 general election it won 8 out of 35 seats. In regards to social legislation (including health, housing, and education), the Labour-controlled authorities were both progressive in outlook and generous in spending. This meant that South Wales (where Labour was strong) had better outcomes in health, housing, and education than other parts of Wales, and this despite the poverty of the councils themselves. For instance, Glamorgan, Carmarthenshire, and parts of Monmouthshire provided free school meals, while provision of this kind was exceptional in most of North Wales, Wrexham being an exception. A move towards expanding secondary school places to be filled on merit was also far more evident in authorities controlled by the Labour Party. In the most industrialised parts of Wales, Labour-dominated councils successfully tried not only to increase the number of secondary-school places (even during the years of the Great depression), but also worked towards providing these places free, and therefore on merit, instead of on ability to pay. By 1932, over 60% of places were free, a far higher figure than in England. In Rhondda, the dominant Labour council introduced progressive measures such as free milk for children from poor households which helped to counteract some of the worst effects of the Great Depression, while in Swansea, a government grant was obtained to finance a number of civic building projects, the means test was exercised relatively humanely and a nursery school was opened.

=== London county council ===
The biggest breakthrough for Labour in local government came in 1934, with the capture of the most powerful local authority in Britain, the LCC. Under the leadership of Herbert Morrison, the Labour-run LCC implemented a wide range of progressive social democratic reforms which transformed London into a model of responsible and progressive local Labour government. A year after taking office, Morrison took steps to raise the rates of London householders to 31% (seven shillings in the pound), and had run through what was termed a "nest egg" of £2,000,000 he had found upon taking office, salted away in London County Council's treasury by London Conservatives. This money was used in treating London's poor more humanely, providing more homes for the aged poor, more free education and modernising hospitals, improving patients' diets and increasing their numbers of staff.

As leader of the LCC, Morrison presided over the development of London's housing, health, education and transport services, together with the unification of the transport system and creating a 'green belt' around London's suburbs. In addition, new schools were constructed, measures to combat corruption and inefficiency were carried out, a major programme of slum clearance and council house construction was carried out, and a municipal health service was set up, which became a model for the NHS. Led by Morrison and his presidium of Charles Latham, Isaac Hayward and Lewis Silkin, the LCC proved to be a successful local Labour administration. An offensive was carried out against London's slums, with new homes built, repairs carried out, and rents reduced for those moving to new municipal accommodation from slum areas. Spending on welfare services, education and health care was increased from 1934 onwards, with more staff employed in hospitals and enjoying better pay and conditions. More free places in secondary education were offered, improvements made in patient care; new schools were constructed, and more amenities were provided, with the initiation of more milk, playing fields, and health visits. The LCC also made efforts to ensure that reforms were carried out to reduce the harshness of public assistance. Morrison's plans for a "green belt" surrounding London also came to fruition, which provided the relevant local authorities with funds to purchase and maintain land.

Services were expanded under Morrison, with the initiation of new main drainage schemes, more major highways and bridge improvements, and new headquarters and appliances for the fire brigade. The LCC parks were also developed, with Victoria Park in the East End "transformed with a wide range of facilities" and other parks got more baths, bowling greens, athletic grounds, paddling pools, playgrounds, refreshment places, gymnasia, and sun-bathing sections. Amenities were provided for children such as entertainment during school holidays in the form of story-tellers, conjurers, and comedians, specially designed saucer-shaped paddling pools were installed to help parents in spotting their children, and special children's lavatories were built to reduce the chance of indecent assault.

In housing, more clearance areas and compulsory purchase orders were introduced, and new sites were found for building. Also, as noted by a biography on Morrison, the opposition attacked Morrison "for the deliberate injection of LCC housing into previous Tory strongholds". The standard of the houses was improved, with more facilities and bigger sizes, and Morrison's administration also scrapped the Municipal Reform tenement where one bathroom was shared by three families. More capital expenditure was allocated towards the LCC housing programme, new flats and houses were built more quickly, and rents were reduced for tenants coming from the slums, "who often found the increased rents difficult to bear when they were rehoused".

More money was allocated towards public health and welfare services by Morrison's administration. Somerville Hastings had a great influence over health policy in London and was for many years Chairman of the Public Health Committee, which was dominated by members of the Socialist Medical Association. Hospitals were modernised and re-equipped, and more staff were employed, with improved conditions and pay. Patients also benefited from the installation of wirelesses, improved diets, and the ending of patient contributions for the residential treatment of tuberculosis. Mental patients were allowed a fortnight long holiday by the sea, and visitors to hospital inmates could have their fares paid. Services for the blind were also improved, and midwifery services were extended. In addition, LCC ambulances were made free for maternity cases.

In education, new schools were built and old schools rebuilt, and more money was channelled towards their books, furniture, and apparatus. More attention was given to playing fields, and more staff were employed (at improved conditions) to reduce class sizes. More nursery schools were established, and special schools were improved, with more aids for the handicapped. More health inspections and more milk were provided for schoolchildren, and technical and commercial education establishments were further developments. Some "Tory Shylockisms", brought about by economy cuts, were abolished: more country scholarships were introduced and prizes were restored, while children in residential schools benefited from an increase in educational visits, in pocket money, and a camp holiday each year. Cadet corps for military training were banned from LCC schools, in conjunction with Morrison's belief, as put by a biography on Morrison, that it was wrong "to inculcate militaristic values into the young", and school visits to military displays like the Aldershot tattoo and the Hendon pageant were stopped.

Various reforms to public assistance were also carried out under Morrison. As noted by a biography on Morrison, the "barrack-liked" mixed workhouses were broken up, and children, the blind, the sick, the old, and expectant mothers were treated separately, "instead of all together in institutions for paupers." Conditions for the receipt of relief were relaxed, and a coal allowance was restored. The administration of public assistance was also reformed, with the investigating committees of councillors and co-opted members (which applicants for relief had to appear before under the Municipal reformers) abolished, and in their place full-time adjudicating officers were to interview applicants and take the decisions. As noted by a biography on Morison, Herbert Morrison, "wanted to streamline the administration of relief and to help the applicant by having his case dealt with by a professional in privacy." During his time in office, Morrison was also responsible for the new Waterloo Bridge, the development of the South Bank, and comprehensive town planning.

=== Poplar council ===
One Labour council that acquired great notoriety during the inter-war period was that of Poplar, where the Labour councillors introduced a wide range of reforms including equal pay for women, the introduction of a minimum wage for municipal workers, and improved municipal services and welfare programmes. Dedicated to improving the lives of poor working-class people, the Labour Poor Law Guardians paid generous scales of relief to the poor that led them to fall into debt. The Labour Guardians refused to hand over payments to London County Council that they were supposed to make, and were imprisoned in 1921.

The Poplar Guardians justified the generous scales of relief they paid out, together with their abandonment of principles of less eligibility in terms of a politics of redistribution of the financial burden of unemployment, stating that

If society cannot organise its economic affairs so as to provide work for all its able-bodied members, then society as a whole should provide them with adequate maintenance from national funds, obtained under existing conditions by increased taxation upon the large and superfluous incomes of those whose social position is maintained only as a result of 'preying on the poor

— Metropolis, London: histories and representations since 1800 by David Feldman

The actions of the Labour Guardians were arguably justified on the grounds that Poplar carried a heavier burden than many other boroughs in carrying the costs of poor relief. In 1921, for instance, Poplar had a rateable value of £4m and 86,500 unemployed persons to support, while other, richer councils could call on a rateable value of £15 to support only 4,800 unemployed. George Lansbury, the new mayor of Poplar, proposed that the Council stop collecting the rates for outside, cross-London bodies. This was agreed and on 31 March 1921, Poplar Council set a rate of 4s 4d instead of 6s 10d.

Despite their imprisonment, the Labour Guardians refused to give way, and were released six weeks after they were imprisoned. In addition, the actions of the Poplar councillors in demanding that the burden of the rates be shared more equitably between poorer and richer boroughs led to the passage of legislation which provided for the greater equality between boroughs that they had demanded. Poplar no longer had to carry an unduly heavy burden as all London areas now shared the costs of poor relief in the future. Poplar continued to provide relatively generous scales of relief, paying £2 19s 6d to a family of seven instead of the agreed London rate of £2 14s.

Labour councils not only brought relief to the poorest sections of the community, they provided opportunities for employment and, through the funding of education and library facilities, self-improvement.

— Labour Inside the Gate: A History of the British Labour Party between the Wars by Matthew Worley

== Labour parliamentary activity and influence in the inter-war period ==
Although Labour only held office twice during the Twenties and Thirties, it was active in parliament; submitting bills for consideration on all kinds of subjects such as social assistance, working hours, pay levels, and the prevention of unemployment, while influencing government legislation. In 1925, the Labour Party successfully used its pressure have amendments made to the Widows', Orphans' and Old Age Contributory Pensions Act passed that year, amongst which included the provision of child allowances up until the age of 16 (instead of 14) if at school, higher rates of orphan’s pension for more than one child and also for children removed from the care of their mothers, and the removal of a provision originally put forward by the Conservatives under which war pensions paid to the father or mother a son killed in the First World War would have been deducted from contributory pension. In 1927, the Labour Party successfully put pressure on the conservative government at the time in modifying an unemployment insurance Act passed that year to make it more progressive. Amongst the changes to the legislation influenced by Labour included instruction courses for girl and boys aged 16-17 while in receipt of unemployment benefit, an increase from 3 to 4 years in the statutory period for 30 contributions because of sickness, a reduction in the stamp qualification for benefit for disabled ex-servicemen to 10 stamps, and higher benefit rates for men and women aged 18-21.

Only a handful of (but nevertheless important) Labour bills were adopted by the non-Labour governments in office at that time. In 1922, Arthur Henderson put forward a measure that was passed after amendments as the Infanticide Act. This provided (as noted by one study) “that in cases where at the time a mother caused the death of her child she had not fully recovered from the effects of giving birth to a child and the balance of her mind was thereby disturbed she would be guilty of manslaughter.” In 1938, a Hire Purchase Act was brought in by Ellen Wilkinson which safeguarded families from losing all of their deposit and having their furniture taken away if they couldn’t keep up with their hire-purchase payments any longer. That same year, a Labour MP put forward a bill providing for paid holidays which was supported by both the leisure industry and Conservative press and reached Committee stage. A Holidays With Pay Act was subsequently adopted which gave the authority (as noted by one study) “to introduce paid holidays to industry boards and other statutory bodies installed to mediate wage disputes in sectors with weak organization.”

== Wartime coalition ==
Labour Party individual membership which showcase a large increase in membership after the war. From 1980, records became more accurate when a centralised individual membership database started to be used.

The party returned to government in 1940 as part of the wartime coalition. When Neville Chamberlain resigned in the spring of 1940, incoming-Prime Minister Winston Churchill decided to bring the other main parties into a coalition similar to that of the First World War. Clement Attlee was appointed Lord Privy Seal and a member of the war cabinet, eventually becoming the United Kingdom's first Deputy Prime Minister.

The aggressive trade union leader Ernest Bevin, as Minister of Labour and National Service, directed Britain's allocation of manpower, Herbert Morrison became Home Secretary, Hugh Dalton was Minister of Economic Warfare and later President of the Board of Trade, while A. V. Alexander resumed the role he had held in the previous Labour Government as First Lord of the Admiralty. Labour also filled eight junior posts, a number which rose to seventeen by 1945. According to G. D. H. Cole, the basis of the Wartime Coalition was that the labour ministers would look after the Home Front (including the maintenance of important social services and the mobilisation of manpower). Although the Exchequer remained in the hands of the Conservatives, a firm understanding was made with Labour regarding the equitable distribution of tax burdens.

While serving in coalition with the Conservatives, the Labour members of Churchill's cabinet were able to put their ideals into practice, implementing a wide range of progressive social and economic reforms which did much to improve the living standards and working conditions of working-class Britons. According to Maurice Bruce, "for their influence on the shaping of events this might almost be called the third, as it was certainly the most constructive to date, of Britain's labour governments."

As observed by Kenneth O. Morgan, "Labour ministers were uniquely associated with the triumphs on the home front." Herbert Morrison at the Home Office, assisted by his friend Ellen Wilkinson, was noted for his effective involvement in home defence and presiding over the repairs carried out on major cities affected by the Blitz. Arthur Greenwood, in his capacity as minister without portfolio, commissioned the Beveridge Report which would lay the foundations for the post-war British welfare state. For those in rural areas, Labour in the wartime coalition government was successful in raising unemployment benefits for agricultural workers to a maximum of 41s per week and in introducing a new national minimum wage of 43s.

During the war years, the Labour Party was continuously active (with some success) in pushing for better arrangements of housing and billeting both of evacuees and of workers transferred for war services to already congested industrial areas, for fair systems of food rationing and distribution, for more effective control of prices, and for improvements in service pay and allowances. Labour also pressed hard for better provisions for the victims of air warfare, for more and better civic and industrial restaurants and canteens, and for war-time nurseries for the children of female workers.

In a manifesto on "The Peace", adopted by the 1941 Labour Party Annual Conference, it was claimed that Labour's participation in the Wartime coalition Government had been effective in that, a year after Labour had joined the government, the war was now being fought not only with much greater efficiency, but with a higher regard for social equity as well:

The area of the social services has been increased. Largely through the care and determination of the Trade unions, the standard of life has been well safeguarded. The health of the workers has been protected by the maintenance of the factory codes, and by the institution of factory doctors, canteens, and nurseries. Labour, national and local, has taken its share in civil defence; and in every sphere its activities have done much to improve the provision for the safety and comfort of citizens. The social protection of our people has been facilitated by the alert and continuous watch which has been kept over financial policy. Interest rates have been kept down. The Treasury has assumed powers over the Banks which assure their full co-operation in the policy upon which Parliament decides. The dangers of inflation, ever present in war-time, have been kept to a minimum.

According to the historian G. D. H. Cole, Labour's claims were arguably justified: profiteering was kept down, and there was greater equity both in the allocation of supplies and in taxation. In addition, social services were not merely kept up, but also expanded to meet wartime needs.

Tom Johnston used his position as Secretary of State for Scotland to push through a range of important developmental initiatives, such as the development of hydroelectricity in the Scottish Highlands, while Hugh Dalton's regional policies directly assisted some of the Labour Party's strongest cores of support. The Distribution of Industry Act 1945, pushed through by Hugh Dalton before the end of the wartime coalition, launched a vigorous policy of regenerating "depressed areas" such as industrial Scotland, the North-East of England, Cumbria, and South Wales, while diversifying the economic base of these regions. This foundation of this vigorous regional policy were actually laid during the Second World War, with the extension of the role of the trading estates and the linking of the industrial base of areas like the Welsh mining areas with the operations of government ordinance and armaments plants. James Chuter Ede, a Labour politician who served as the Parliamentary Secretary to the Board of Education, worked together with the conservative politician Rab Butler in drafting the Education Act 1944, while also playing a major role in its passage.

Labour's influence on wartime policy was also evident in the first general statement of peace aims, the Atlantic Charter of August 1941. This included a reference to "improved labour standards, economic advancement and social security" which had been inserted by the War Cabinet into a draft prepared by Franklin D. Roosevelt and Winston Churchill and had actually been insisted on by Bevin.

At the end of 1940, Arthur Greenwood was given the task of planning, in Churchill's words, "a number of practical steps which it is indispensable to take if our society is to move forward." In June 1941, in response to arguments by the Trades Union Congress that there existed inadequacies with the country's system of social insurance, Greenwood set up an Interdepartmental Committee on Social Insurance and Allied Services to look into the state of Britain's social welfare programmes, and see where improvements may be made. Greenwood appointed a Liberal, William Beveridge, chairman of the committee.

Co-operators, in common with the trade unions and labour, pressed hard from the outset of the war for the extension of the food rationing system to cover all essential supplies, arguing that the existence of an unrationed sector would create class injustices and result in time wasted on seeking supplies from shop to shop. Labour responded to Co-operative demands on these issues in March 1941 by establishing a Food Deputation Committee to work for more effective control and rationing of food supplies, together with the creation of an effective Consumers' Council.

In the field of workmen's compensation, Labour succeeded in getting what Labour saw as an unsatisfactory bill withdrawn, and a new Bill introduced "to include single persons and to give improved allowances." The new Workmen's Compensation (Supplementary Allowances) Act, which came into effect in August 1940), provided a supplementary allowance not exceeding 5s a week to all disabled workers, together with a supplementary allowance of 4s a week each for the first and second child, and 3s for each other child younger than 15. For a man with 3 children, the improvement represented 16s a week. For agricultural workers, a bill increasing the maximum unemployment benefit for agricultural workers by 3s a week was amended by Ernest Bevin, with a more generous increase of 6s a week introduced.

A number of reforms were also carried out under the auspices of cabinet member Herbert Morrison. In the area of Civil Defence, rescue services were provided with new methods and new tackle, schools were established to teach rescue men new and safer ways of performing their jobs, and great emphasis was placed on increased training. As noted by a pamphlet documenting Morrison's war work, "From the local week-end school to the NN.F.S. College and the Civil Defence Staff College he insisted on the necessity of adequate training of both officers and men." Morrison is also noted to have worked hard for increases in pay and allowances for Civil Defence and War Reserve police, and in the end flat gratuities were authorised for whole-timers "who had done such a fine job in the blitz." A National Fire Service was also set up under Morrison, which led to improved working conditions such as a reduced working week and higher rates of pay. Several other progressive reforms were carried out under Morrison; affecting areas such as penal administration, salaries and conditions, and workmen's compensation.

The Minister of Labour and National Service, Ernest Bevin did much to improve working conditions, raising the wages of the lowest paid male workers, such as miners, railwaymen, and agricultural labourers, while also persuading and forcing employers, under threat of removal of their Essential Works Order, to improve company medical and welfare provision, together with sanitary and safety provisions. This was important both for improving working conditions and for cementing worker consent to the war effort, and as a result of Bevin's efforts, doctors, nurses, and welfare officers multiplied on the shop floor while there was a threefold increase in the provision of works canteens. Almost 5,000 canteens were directly created by Bevin in controlled establishments, while a further 6,800 were set up by private employers by 1944. During the course of the war, the number of works doctors increased from 60 to about 1,000. This provision, however, was much more extensive within larger factories, with smaller employers continuing "to barely comply with the minimum provision of a first aid box." Accident rates did, however, decline after 1942. A scheme for training and resettling disabled persons was also launched, and improvements in nurses' pay were carried out.

A bill was introduced by Bevin increased unemployment benefits and extended unemployment insurance coverage to non-manual workers earning up to £420. National Health Insurance benefits were also increased, while the income level was increased to the same level. In addition, a further Bill raised Supplementary Old Age Pensions and Unemployment Assistance. New Orders were also made governing Industrial Diseases, "both extending and improving welfare and medical services in these fields," while in the field of industrial relations Bevin assisted in the creation of 43 new Joint Industrial Councils. A system of resettlement grants was also established to help ex-Service men and women to either start or restart a business.

The Second World War also saw significant improvements in the position of trade unions, which were encouraged by Bevin. Trade unions were integrated into joint consultation at all levels of government and industry, with the TUC drawn in to represent labour on the National Joint Advisory Council (1939) and the joint Consultative Committee (1940). A similar status was bestowed upon employers' organisations, which led Middlemass to argue that capital and organised labour had become "governing institutions" within a tripartite industrial relations system "with the state at the fulcrum." The elevation of the status of organised labour to one of parity with capital in Whitehall was effectively summed up by Bevin's biographer as such:

The organised working class represented by the trade unions was for the first time brought into a position of partnership in the national enterprise of war – a partnership on equal not inferior terms, as in the First World War.

Collective bargaining was further extended by Bevin, who radically extended both the Wages Boards (the renamed Trades Boards) and the Whitley Committees, 46 of the latter were formed during the Second World War, and by the end of the war 15.5 million workers were covered by the minimum wage provisions by the Wages Boards. On the shop floor, Bevin directly encouraged the formation of joint production committees to extend worker's participation in industry. By June 1944, almost 4,500 such committees were in existence, covering 3.5 million workers. By the end of the war, the joint production committees were intervening in areas once considered to be the sacrosanct domain of employers, such as health, welfare, transfers of labour, machine staffing, technology, piece rate fixing, and wage payment systems. These developments brought about significant improvements to conditions in the workplace, with a Mass-Observation survey carried out in 1942 noting that "the quick sack and the unexplained instability" of the 1930s had practically vanished. During the 1940s, significant improvements in occupational health and safety standards were brought about both by the rising bargaining power of workers within the older "staple" sectors of the economy and the rise of "the pro-active wartime and post-war state."

Bevin was also responsible for the passage of the Determination of Needs Act in 1941, which finally abolished the long-detested household means test. After the passage of the Determination of Needs Act, the Labour Movement continued to press for improvements, particularly for the extension of the principles of the new legislation to cover Public Assistance and other services as well (at that time, it only covered the Assistance Board). In 1943, this was achieved by further legislation, which also improved conditions relating to supplementary pensions. Throughout the war period, the Labour movement (both in and out of Parliament) pressed successfully for a number of changes liberalising the administration of the social services.

The Catering Wages Act (1943), another initiative by Bevin, established a Catering Wages Commission to oversee wages and working conditions in restaurants and hotels. Inspectors were also appointed to ensure that employers complied with Bevin's insistence on the provision of canteens, welfare officers, and personnel officers in factories. Bevin also did much to improve conditions for those with disabilities, of which little had been done for before the outbreak of the war. In 1941, Bevin introduced an interim retraining scheme, which was followed by the interdepartmental Tomlinson Committee of the Rehabilitation and Resettlement of the Disabled. According to the historian Pat Thane, the Committee served as "a mouthpiece for Bevin's own aspirations," and its proposals for improving the lives of the disabled culminated in the Disabled Persons (Employment) Act 1944.

Bevin and the other Labour ministers were also able to ensure that, compared with the First World War, there was greater equality of sacrifice within society. Profiteering was effectively controlled, while rent controls and food subsidies helped to keep down wartime inflation. Wartime wages were allowed to increase in line with, and earnings to surpass, the rate of price inflation, while the tax system became more progressive, with taxation becoming heavier on the very rich (this movement towards greater progressivity was maintained under the Attlee government, with the top rate of income tax reaching 98% in 1949). These policies led to a narrowing of wealth inequalities, with the real value of wage incomes increasing by some 18% between 1938 and 1947, while the real value of property income fell by 15% and salaries by some 21% over that same period.

The influence of the Labour Party in the wartime coalition was commented on by one right-winger in 1945, who complained that "We've had a Labour government for five years ... Winston hardly touched the home front and that's why he's out."

== Post-War victory under Clement Attlee ==
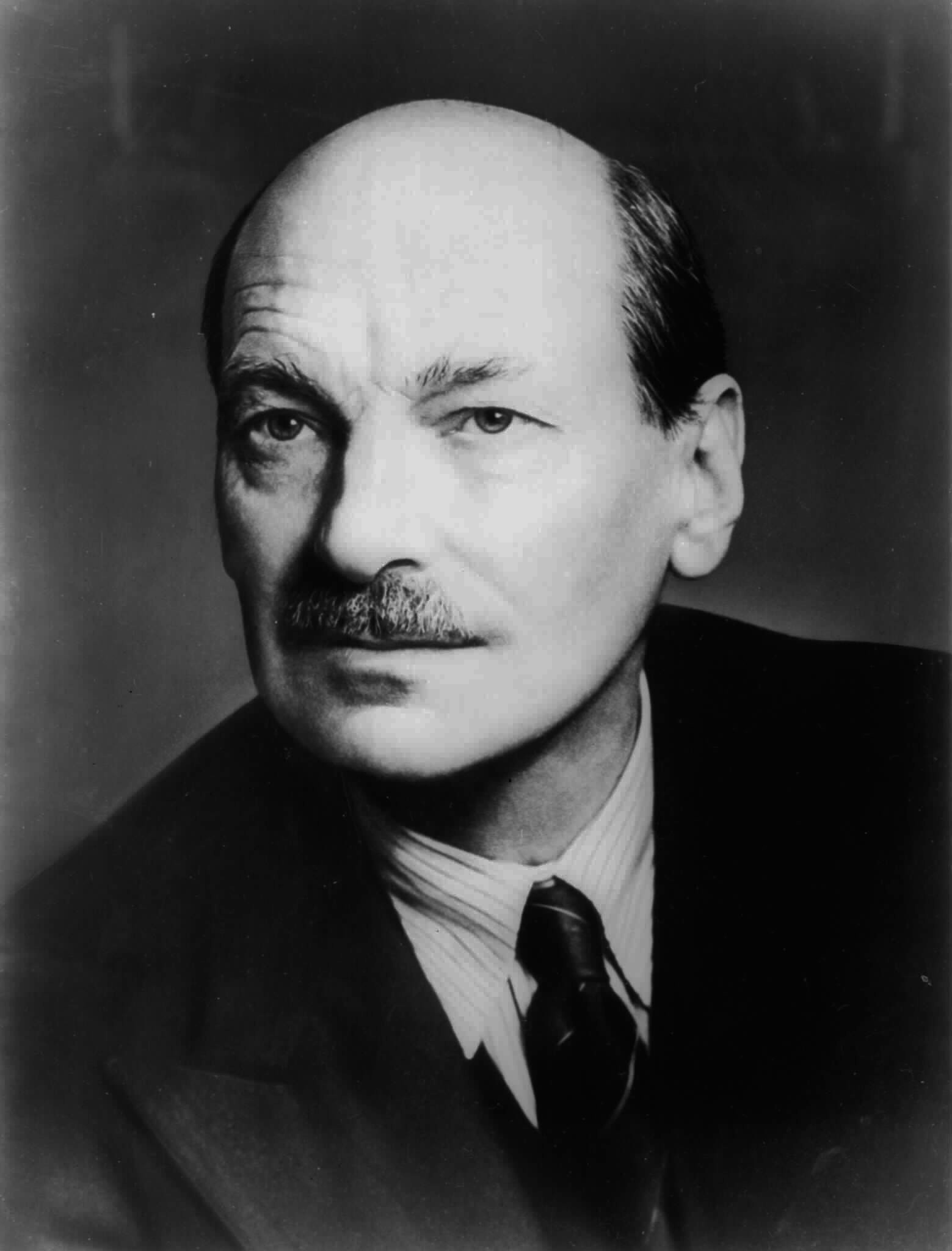
Clement Attlee, Labour Prime Minister (1945–51)

With the end of the war in Europe in May 1945, Labour resolved not to repeat the Liberal Party's error of 1918, and withdrew from the government to contest the 1945 general election (5 July) in opposition to Churchill's Conservatives. Surprising many observers, Labour won a landslide victory, winning just under 50% of the vote with a majority of 145 seats. The exact reasons for the victory are still debated. During the war, public opinion surveys showed public opinion moving to the left and in favour of radical social reform. There was little public appetite for a return to the poverty and mass unemployment of the inter-war years which had become associated with the Conservatives.

Francis (1995) argues there was consensus both in the Labour's national executive committee and at party conferences on a definition of socialism that stressed moral improvement as well as material improvement. The Attlee government was committed to rebuilding British society as an ethical commonwealth, using public ownership and controls to abolish extremes of wealth and poverty. Labour's ideology contrasted sharply with the contemporary Conservative Party's defence of individualism, inherited privileges, and income inequality.

Attlee's government proved itself to be one of the most radical British governments of the 20th century, implementing the economic theories of Liberal economist John Maynard Keynes, presiding over a policy of nationalising major industries and utilities including the Bank of England, coal mining, the steel industry, electricity, gas, telephones, and inland transport including railways, road haulage and canals. It developed and implemented the "cradle to grave" welfare state conceived by the Liberal economist William Beveridge. To this day the party considers the 1948 creation of Britain's publicly funded National Health Service under health minister Aneurin Bevan its proudest achievement. Attlee's government also began the process of dismantling the British Empire when it granted independence to India and Pakistan in 1947, followed by Burma (Myanmar) and Ceylon (Sri Lanka) the following year. At a secret meeting in January 1947, Attlee and six cabinet ministers, including Foreign Secretary Ernest Bevin, decided to proceed with the development of Britain's nuclear weapons programme, in opposition to the pacifist and anti-nuclear stances of a large element inside the Labour Party.

Labour won the 1950 general election but with a much reduced majority of five seats. Soon after the 1950 election, things started to go badly wrong for the Labour government. Defence became one of the divisive issues for Labour itself, especially defence spending (which reached 14% of GDP in 1951 during the Korean War). These costs put enormous strain on public finances, forcing savings to be found elsewhere. The Chancellor of the Exchequer, Hugh Gaitskell introduced prescription charges for NHS dentures and spectacles, causing Bevan, along with Harold Wilson (President of the Board of Trade) to resign over the dilution of the principle of free treatment.

Soon after this, another election was called. Labour narrowly lost the October 1951 election to the Conservatives, despite their receiving a larger share of the popular vote and, in fact, their highest vote ever numerically.

Most of the changes introduced by the 1945–51 Labour government however were accepted by the Conservatives and became part of the "post-war consensus", which lasted until the 1970s.

== "Thirteen Wasted Years" ==
Following its defeat in 1951, the party became split over the future direction of socialism. The "Gaitskellite" right of the party led by Hugh Gaitskell and associated with thinkers such as Anthony Crosland wanted the party to adopt a moderate, social democratic position, whereas the "Bevanite" left led by Aneurin Bevan wanted the party to adopt a more radical, socialist position. This split, and the fact that the 1950s saw economic recovery and general public contentment with the Conservative governments of the time, helped keep the party out of power for thirteen years.

After being defeated once again at the 1955 general election, Attlee resigned as leader and was replaced by Gaitskell. The trade union block vote, which generally voted with the leadership, ensured that the Bevanites were eventually defeated.

In the decade following the Second World War, Labour councils played an important part in the housing reconstruction that followed the end of the conflict, and stood as important players in the reconstruction of housing and city centres. In Newcastle, under the leadership of the visionary but corrupt T. Dan Smith, an accelerated "modernisation" of the city took place, as characterised by an ambitious programme of road construction and public building and the replacement of slum terraces with new innovative estates such as the Byker "wall".

The three key divisive issues which were to split the Labour party in successive decades emerged during this period; nuclear disarmament, the famous Clause IV of the party's constitution, which called for the ultimate nationalisation of all means of production in the British economy, and Britain's entry into the European Economic Community (EEC). Tensions between the two opposing sides were exacerbated after Attlee resigned as leader in 1955 and Gaitskell defeated Bevan in the leadership election that followed. The party was briefly revived and unified during the Suez Crisis of 1956, which badly damaged the Conservative Party, by its opposition to the policy of prime minister Anthony Eden. Eden was replaced by Harold Macmillan, but the economy continued to improve.

In the 1959 election the Conservatives fought under the slogan "Life is better with the Conservatives, don't let Labour ruin it", which saw the government majority increase. Following the election bitter internecine disputes resumed. Gaitskell blamed the Left for the defeat and attempted unsuccessfully to amend Clause IV. At a hostile party conference in 1960, he failed to prevent a vote adopting unilateral nuclear disarmament as a party policy, declaring in response that he would "fight, fight and fight again to save the party I love". The decision was reversed the following year, but it remained a divisive issue and many in the left continued to call for a change of leadership.

When the Conservative government of Harold Macmillan attempted to take Britain into the European Communities in 1962, Gaitskell alienated some of his supporters by his opposition to British membership. In a speech to the party conference in October 1962, Gaitskell claimed that membership in the EEC would mean "the end of Britain as an independent European state. I make no apology for repeating it. It means the end of a thousand years of history".

Labour revisionism turned out to be a powerful ideological tendency within the Party in the 1950s and 1960s, taking intellectual sustenance from Anthony Crosland's book, The Future of Socialism (1956) and political leadership from Hugh Gaitskell. Its most important intellectuals included Douglas Jay, Roy Jenkins and the writers who contributed to Socialist Commentary. The goal was to reformulate old socialist principles and bring the Labour Party's policies up to date with an ever-changing British society and economy. Revisionism rejected the old view that socialism ought to be primarily identified with the ownership of the means of production. This led to continuous nationalisation losing its position as a central goal. Secondly, revisionism espoused a series of political values focused on personal liberty, social welfare and equality. Themes of destroying or overthrowing the rich and elite were downplayed in favour of government policies of taxation, widespread educational opportunity and expanded social services. Revisionists insisted on the necessity of a market-oriented mixed economy with a central role for capitalism and entrepreneurship.

Gaitskell died suddenly in January 1963 from kidney failure as a result of contracting the rare Lupus disease. His death made way for Harold Wilson to lead the party. The term "thirteen wasted years" was coined by Wilson as a slogan for the 1964 general election, in reference to what he claimed were thirteen wasted years of Conservative government.

== 1963–1976: Labour Party under Harold Wilson ==
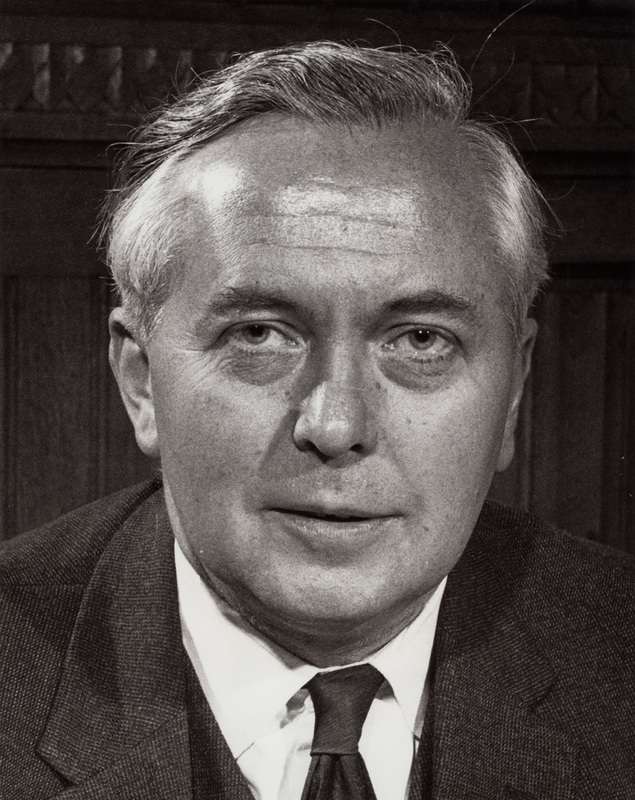
Harold Wilson, Labour Prime Minister (1964–70 and 1974–76)

A downturn in the economy, along with a series of scandals in the early 1960s (the most notorious being the Profumo affair), engulfed the Conservative government by 1963. The Labour party returned to government with a wafer-thin 4 seat majority under Wilson in the 1964 election, and increased their majority to 96 in 1966 election remaining in power until the 1970 election which, contrary to expectations during the campaign, they lost.

=== Economic policies ===
The 1960s Labour government had a different emphasis from its 1940s predecessor. Harold Wilson put faith in economic planning as a way to solve Britain's economic problems. Wilson famously referred to the "white heat of technology", referring to the modernisation of British industry. This was to be achieved through the swift adoption of new technology, aided by government-funded infrastructure improvements and the creation of large high-tech public sector corporations guided by a Ministry of Technology. Economic planning through the new Department of Economic Affairs was to improve the trade balance, whilst Labour carefully targeted taxation aimed at "luxury" goods and services.

In practice however, Labour had difficulty managing the economy under the "Keynesian consensus" and the international markets rallied against the party. Events derailed much of the initial optimism. Upon coming to power, the government was informed that the trade deficit was far worse than expected. This soon led to a currency crisis; despite enormous efforts to shore up the value of sterling, in November 1967 the government was forced into devaluation of the pound from $2.80 to $2.40, which damaged the government's popularity to some extent.

For much of the remaining Parliament the government followed stricter controls in public spending and the necessary austerity measures caused consternation amongst the Party membership and the trade unions.

In the event, the devaluation, and austerity measures successfully restored the balance of payments into a surplus by 1969. However, they unexpectedly turned into a small deficit again in 1970. The bad figures were announced just before polling in the 1970 general election, and are often cited as one of the reasons for Labour's defeat.

As a gesture towards Labour's more left-wing supporters, Wilson's government renationalised the steel industry in 1967 (which had been denationalised by the Conservatives in the 1950s) creating British Steel Corporation.

=== Social and educational reforms ===
The 1964–1970 Labour government carried out a broad range of reforms during its time in office, in such areas as social security, civil liberties, housing, health, education, and worker's rights.

It is perhaps best remembered for the liberal social reforms introduced or supported by Home Secretary Roy Jenkins. Notable amongst these was the partial decriminalisation of male homosexuality and abortion, reform of divorce laws, the abolition of theatre censorship and capital punishment (except for a small number of offences — notably high treason) and various legislation addressing race relations and racial discrimination.

In Wilson's defence, his supporters also emphasise the easing of means testing for non-contributory welfare benefits, the linking of pensions to earnings, and the provision of industrial-injury benefits. Wilson's government also made significant reforms to education, most notably the expansion of comprehensive education and the creation of the Open University. Outlays for social security, health and education went up by 45% during Wilson's first three years in office, and in 1967 he asserted that “We have ended the slide to social inequality and public neglect.”

In spite of the economic difficulties faced by Wilson's government, it was therefore able to achieve important advances in a number of domestic policy areas. As reflected by Harold Wilson in 1971,

It was a government which faced disappointment after disappointment and none greater than the economic restraints in our ability to carry through the social revolution to which we were committed at the speed we would have wished. Yet, despite those restraints and the need to transfer resources from domestic expenditure, private and public, to the needs of our export markets, we carried through an expansion in the social services, health, welfare and housing, unparalleled in our history.

As noted by one historian, in summing up the reform record of Wilson's government, "In spite of the economic problems encountered by the First Wilson Government and in spite of (and to some degree in response to) the criticisms of its own supporters, Labour presided over a notable expansion of state welfare during its time in office."

=== "In Place of Strife" ===
Wilson's government in 1969 proposed a series of reforms to the legal basis for industrial relations (labour law) in the UK, which were outlined in a White Paper entitled "In Place of Strife", which proposed to give trade unions statutory rights, but also to limit their power. The White Paper was championed by Wilson and Barbara Castle. The proposals however faced stiff opposition from the Trades Union Congress, and some key cabinet ministers such as James Callaghan.

The opponents won the day and the proposals were shelved. This episode proved politically damaging for Wilson, whose approval ratings fell to 26%; the lowest for any Prime Minister since polling began.

In hindsight, many have argued that the failure of the unions to adopt the proposals of In Place of Strife, led to the far more drastic curbs on trade union power under Margaret Thatcher in the 1980s.

== 1970s ==
In the 1970 general election, Edward Heath's Conservatives narrowly defeated Harold Wilson's government reflecting some disillusionment amongst many who had voted Labour in 1966. The Conservatives quickly ran into difficulties, alienating Ulster Unionists and many Unionists in their own party after signing the Sunningdale Agreement in Ulster. Heath's government also faced the 1974 miners strike which forced the government to adopt a "Three-Day Week". The 1970s proved to be a very difficult time for the Heath, Wilson and Callaghan administrations. Faced with a mishandled oil crisis, a consequent worldwide economic downturn, and a badly suffering British economy.

The 1970s saw tensions re-emerge between Labour's left and right wings, which eventually caused a catastrophic split in the party in the 1980s and the formation of the Social Democratic Party. Following the perceived disappointments of the 1960s Labour government and the failures of the 'revisionist' right, the left of the party under Tony Benn and Michael Foot became increasingly influential during the early 1970s.

The left drew up a radical programme; Labour's Programme 1973, which pledged to bring about a "fundamental and irreversible shift in the balance of power and wealth in favour of working people and their families". This programme referred to a "far reaching Social Contract between workers and the Government" and called for a major extension of public ownership and state planning. The programme was accepted by that year's party conference. Wilson publicly accepted many of the policies of the Programme with some reservations, but the condition of the economy allowed little room for manoeuvre. In practice many of the proposals of the programme were heavily watered down when Labour returned to government.

=== Return to power in 1974 ===
Labour returned to power again under Wilson a few weeks after the February 1974 general election, forming a minority government with Ulster Unionist support. The Conservatives were unable to form a government as they had fewer seats, even though they had received more votes. It was the first general election since 1924 in which both main parties received less than 40% of the popular vote, and was the first of six successive General Elections in which Labour failed to reach 40% of the popular vote. In a bid for Labour to gain a majority, a second election was soon called for October 1974 in which Labour, still with Harold Wilson as leader, scraped a majority of three, gaining just 18 seats and taking their total to 319.

==== European referendum ====
Britain had entered the European Economic Community (EEC) in 1973 while Edward Heath was prime minister. Although Harold Wilson and the Labour party had opposed this, in government Wilson switched to backing membership, but was defeated in a special one day Labour conference on the issue leading to a national referendum on which the yes and no campaigns were both cross-party – the referendum voted in 1975 to continue Britain's membership by two-thirds to one third. This issue later caused catastrophic splits in the Labour Party in the 1980s, leading to the formation of the Social Democratic Party.

In the initial legislation during the Heath Government, the Bill affirming Britain's entry was only passed because of a rebellion of 72 Labour MPs led by Roy Jenkins and including future leader John Smith, who voted against the Labour whip and along with Liberal MPs more than countered the effects of Conservative rebels who had voted against the Conservative Whip.

==== Harold Wilson steps down ====
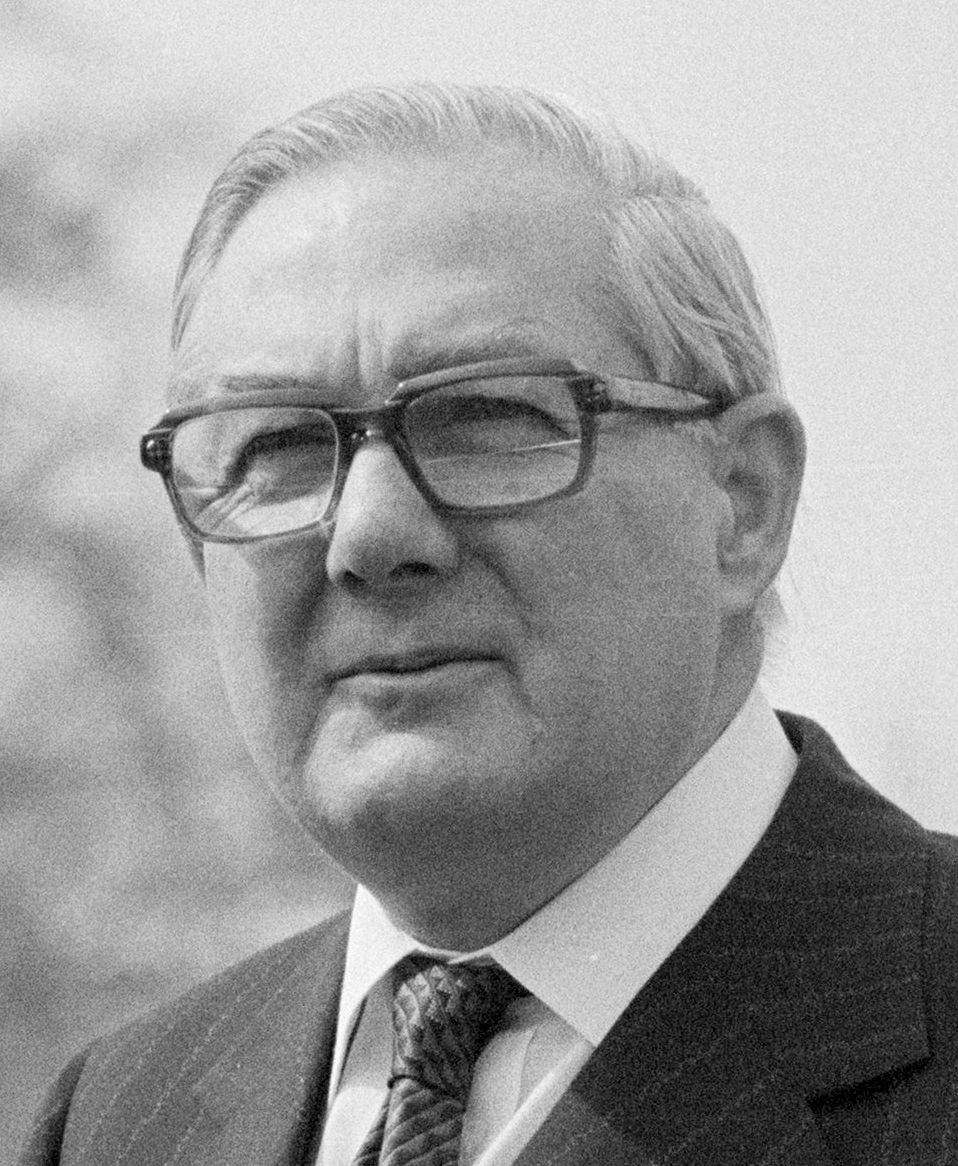
James Callaghan, Labour Prime Minister (1976–1979)

In April 1976 Wilson surprisingly stood down as Labour Party leader. He was replaced by James Callaghan who immediately removed a number of left-wingers (such as Barbara Castle) from the cabinet.

The party in Scotland suffered the breakaway of two MPs into the Scottish Labour Party (SLP). Whilst ultimately the SLP proved no real threat to the Labour Party's strong Scottish electoral base it did show that the issue of Scottish devolution was becoming increasingly contentious, especially after the discovery of North Sea Oil.

==== Economic and political troubles ====
The 1970s Labour government faced enormous economic problems and a precarious political situation. Faced with a global recession and spiralling inflation. Many of Britain's traditional manufacturing industries were collapsing in the face of foreign competition. Unemployment, and industrial unrest were rising.

===== Economic record =====
The ambitious promise made by Labour in a 1973 party programme was to bring about "a fundamental irreversible shift in the balance of power and wealth, in favour of working people and their families". Following an expansionary fiscal policy, as characterised by boosts to public spending, more restrictive economic policies were adopted, with expenditure cuts and limits on wage increases. In 1975, for instance, an austerity budget was introduced that reduced public spending for 1977–78 by £900 million, at the expense of about 200,000 jobs. To reduce high levels of inflation, various income policies were implemented that reduced the real earnings of most workers, with a 1980 Fabian study by Paul Ormerod noting that the attainment of lower inflation doesn't correspond with a rise in real incomes, as it would take two years (according to the economic models of the Treasury, the National Institute and the London Business School) that workers "can realise real wage increases through reductions in the rate of increase of prices following heir wage restraint". Recognising the negative impact that wage restraint was having on the living standards of ordinary workers, the government introduced expansionary budgets in March and October 1977 and again in April 1978, which were partly designed to boost take home pay in real terms via tax reductions. The April 1978 budget introduced a reduced tax rate band along with significant increases in child benefit. The so-called "Rooker-Wise" amendment to a 1977 budget, named after the labour backbenchers Jeff Rooker and Audrey Wise, indexed income tax allowances to cost-of-living rises as a means of safeguarding taxpayers from "fiscal creep", a situation where inflation increases tax bills "by reducing the real value of income tax allowances". Despite such measures, however, most people by September 1978 "were no better off in real terms than they had been in March 1975".

Between 1974 and 1977, real disposable incomes fell by approximately 7%, while according to the Family Expenditure Survey, the reduction in the disposable income of families with four children was as high as 20.% Although by 1978/79 the living standards of most household types had almost been restored to the levels they had reached back in 1973/74, this was, as noted by academic Peter Townsend, "scarcely cause for congratulation for five years of Labour government". The share of government expenditure on goods and services declined from 24.5% in 1973/74 to 23.5% in 1978/79, while total spending (excluding debt interest) went down between 1975/76 and 1978/79 in real terms. Priority services for disabled people and the elderly were cut in a large number of areas while the number of discretionary LEA discretionary grants fell during Labour's latter period in office. While eligibility limits for free school meals had been made more generous, a 1977 price increase resulted in a fall of over 500,000 in the number of children eating school dinners and a rise of about 170,000 in the numbers eligible for free meals but not actually receiving them. In addition, during Labour's time in office from 1974 to 1979, annual public spending was increased in a number of areas while cut in others.

===== Gains in education =====
According to a study by Tessa Blackstone, Labour did score various achievements in the field of education. Between 1974 and 1979, nearly 1,000 new comprehensive schools were established, and by Labour's final year in office over 80% of children attended such schools. The number of further education courses carrying mandatory awards were increased in 1976. In addition, the amount spent per head rose considerably in the school sector between 1973/74 and 1976/77 (which was especially true of nursery, primary and special schools) and, while there had been reductions in expenditure per head at the post-school stage, there had been "a small improvement in the distribution of resources towards the universal part of the system from which all benefit relative to the selective parts from which only a minority benefit". Nevertheless, according to the same study, the government failed to ensure that cuts in expenditure growth "did not hit some areas of education where working class children or adults were most likely to be affected; nor did it make much impact on redistributing existing resources". In the field of taxation, a proposed wealth tax never materialised, and in 1977 the number of higher rate tax payers were reduced by a quarter while a further reduction took place a year later following amendments by the Conservative opposition supported by the Liberal Party.

===== Outside financial help =====
In the autumn of 1976 the Labour Government under Chancellor Denis Healey was forced to ask the International Monetary Fund (IMF) for a loan to ease the economy through its financial troubles. The conditions attached to the loan included harsh austerity measures such as sharp cuts in public spending, which were highly unpopular with party supporters. This forced the government to abandon much of the radical program which it had adopted in the early 1970s, much to the anger of left wingers such as Tony Benn. It later turned out however that the loan had not been necessary. The error had been caused by incorrect financial estimates by the Treasury which overestimated public borrowing requirements. The government only drew on half of the loan and was able to pay it back in full by 1979.

The 1970s Labour government adopted an interventionist approach to the economy, setting up the National Enterprise Board to channel public investment into industry, and giving state support to ailing industries. Several large nationalisations were carried out during this era: The struggling motor manufacturer British Leyland was partly nationalised in 1975. In 1977 British Aerospace as well as what remained of the shipbuilding industry were nationalised, as well as the British National Oil Corporation. The Government also succeeded in replacing the Family Allowance with the more generous child benefit, while the Development Land Tax of 1976 introduced an 80% tax on development gain after the first £160,000.

===== No majority in Commons =====
The Wilson and Callaghan governments were hampered by their lack of a workable majority in the Commons. At the October 1974 election, Labour won a majority of only three seats. Several by-election losses meant that by 1977, Callaghan was heading a minority government, and was forced to do deals with other parties to survive. An arrangement was negotiated in 1977 with the Liberals under David Steel known as the Lib-Lab pact, but this ended after one year. After this, deals were made with the Scottish National Party and the Welsh nationalist Plaid Cymru, which prolonged the life of the government slightly longer.

===== Scottish National Party withdraws support =====
The nationalist parties demanded devolution to their respective countries in return for their support for the government. When referendums for Scottish and Welsh devolution were held in March 1979, the Welsh referendum was rejected outright, and the Scottish referendum had a narrow majority in favour but did not reach the threshold of 40% support that the Labour government insisted must be met, invalidating the result. This led to the SNP withdrawing support for the government, which finally brought it down.

=== "Winter of Discontent" and defeat by Margaret Thatcher ===
The 1973 oil crisis had caused a legacy of high inflation in the British economy which peaked at 26.9% in 1975. The Wilson and Callaghan governments attempted to combat this by entering into a social contract with the trade unions, which introduced wage restraint and limited pay rises to limits set by the government. This policy was initially fairly successful at controlling inflation, which had been reduced to 7.4% by 1978.

Callaghan had been widely expected to call a general election in the autumn of 1978, when most opinion polls showed Labour to have a narrow lead. However instead, he decided to extend the wage restraint policy for another year in the hope that the economy would be in a better shape in time for a 1979 election. This proved to be a big mistake. The extension of wage restraint was unpopular with the trade unions, and the government's attempt to impose a "5% limit" on pay rises caused resentment amongst workers and trade unions, with whom relations broke down.

During the winter of 1978–79 there were widespread strikes in favour of higher pay rises which caused significant disruption to everyday life. The strikes affected lorry drivers, railway workers, car workers and local government and hospital workers. These came to be dubbed as the "Winter of Discontent".

The perceived relaxed attitude of Callaghan to the crisis reflected badly upon public opinion of the government's ability to run the country. After the withdrawal of SNP support for the government, the Conservatives put down a vote of no confidence, which was held and passed by one vote on 28 March 1979, forcing a general election.

In the 1979 general election, Labour suffered electoral defeat to the Conservatives led by Margaret Thatcher. The numbers voting Labour hardly changed between February 1974 and 1979, but in 1979 the Conservative Party achieved big increases in support in the Midlands and South of England, mainly from the ailing Liberals, and benefited from a surge in turnout.

The actions of the trade unions during the Winter of Discontent were used by Margaret Thatcher's government to justify anti-trade union legislation during the 1980s.

The Wilson and Callaghan governments of the 1970s tried to control inflation (which reached 23.7% in 1975) by a policy of wage restraint. This was fairly successful, reducing inflation to 7.4% by 1978, but led to increasingly strained relations between the government and the trade unions. The Labour governments of the 1970s did, however, manage to protect many people from the economic storm, with pensions increasing by 20% in real terms between 1974 and 1979, while measures such as rent controls and food and transport subsidies prevented the incomes of other people from deteriorating further.

As a means of improving the living standards of those in receipt of state benefits, the government index-linked short-term benefits to the rate of inflation, while pensions and long-term benefits were tied to increases in prices or earnings, whichever was higher (previously, benefit increases were tied only to prices). In addition, new benefits for the disabled and infirm were introduced whilst pensioners benefited from the largest ever increase in pensions up until that period. New employment legislation strengthened equal pay provisions, guaranteed payments for workers on short-time and temporarily laid-off and introduced job security and maternity leave for pregnant women. Housing rehabilitation was encouraged via the establishment of Housing Action Areas and better improvement grants, whilst public sector housing completions rose 40,000 from the 111,500 achieved in 1974, before falling to barely 95,000 by 1979. In addition, furnished tenants were finally provided with security of tenure.

Under the Social Security Act of 1975, the government committed itself to the uprating of long-term benefits in line with earnings or prices, whichever was more beneficial to recipients. However, short-term benefits were only linked to prices. The Supplementary Benefits Act 1976 introduced new levels of financial support for those on little or no income, while new benefits were introduced for those with disabilities. For families with children, the system of child cash and tax allowances was replaced in 1977 by a universal Child Benefit for all families with at least one child, For those at work, a supplementary pension scheme was introduced to provide members of the workforce with an additional income in retirement.

The 1974–79 Labour governments also introduced a wide range of new rights for women. Maternity leave was introduced in 1975, while the Sex Discrimination Act 1975 prohibited discrimination against women at work. The Domestic Violence and Matrimonial Proceedings Act 1976 enabled both married and non-married (but cohabiting) women to apply for non-molestation or exclusion orders against abusive partners, while the Homeless Persons Act 1977 required local authorities to permanently house women made homeless as a result of domestic violence. In addition, the Domestic Proceedings and Magistrates' Courts Act 1978 enabled women who were married to abusive partners to apply for injunctions from magistrates' courts to stop further abuse.

A more effective system of workplace inspection was set up, together with the Health and Safety Executive, in response to the plight of many workers who suffered accidents or ill-health as a result of poor working conditions (whose plight, according to Eric Shaw, had long been ignored by the media). Industrial tribunals also provided protection through compensation for unfair dismissal, while the Advisory, Conciliation and Arbitration Service performed an effective function in the management of industrial disputes. Income inequality also fell during the years of the Wilson and Callaghan governments. Full employment and income policy helped to reduce wage differentials, while subsidies on coal, gas, and electricity increased the social wage. Other reforms introduced by Labour included the Congenital Disabilities (Civil Liability) Act 1976 (which provided children who were born disabled due to cases of negligence with a statutory right to claim damages and the Dock Work Regulation Act 1976 (which extended registered dock work to cold-storage depots and warehouses five miles from any waterfront).

Although the Wilson and Callaghan governments were accused by many socialists of failing to put the Labour Party's socialist ideals into practice, it did much to bring about a greater deal of social justice in British society, as characterised by a significant reduction in poverty during the course of the 1970s, and arguably played as great a role as the Attlee Government in advancing the cause of social democracy and reducing social and economic inequalities in the United Kingdom. As noted by the historian Eric Shaw: "In the seventeen years that it occupied office, Labour accomplished much in alleviating poverty and misery, and in giving help and sustenance to groups – the old, the sick, the disabled – least capable of protecting themselves in a market economy."

== 1979–1997: "Wilderness Years" ==
=== Michael Foot ===
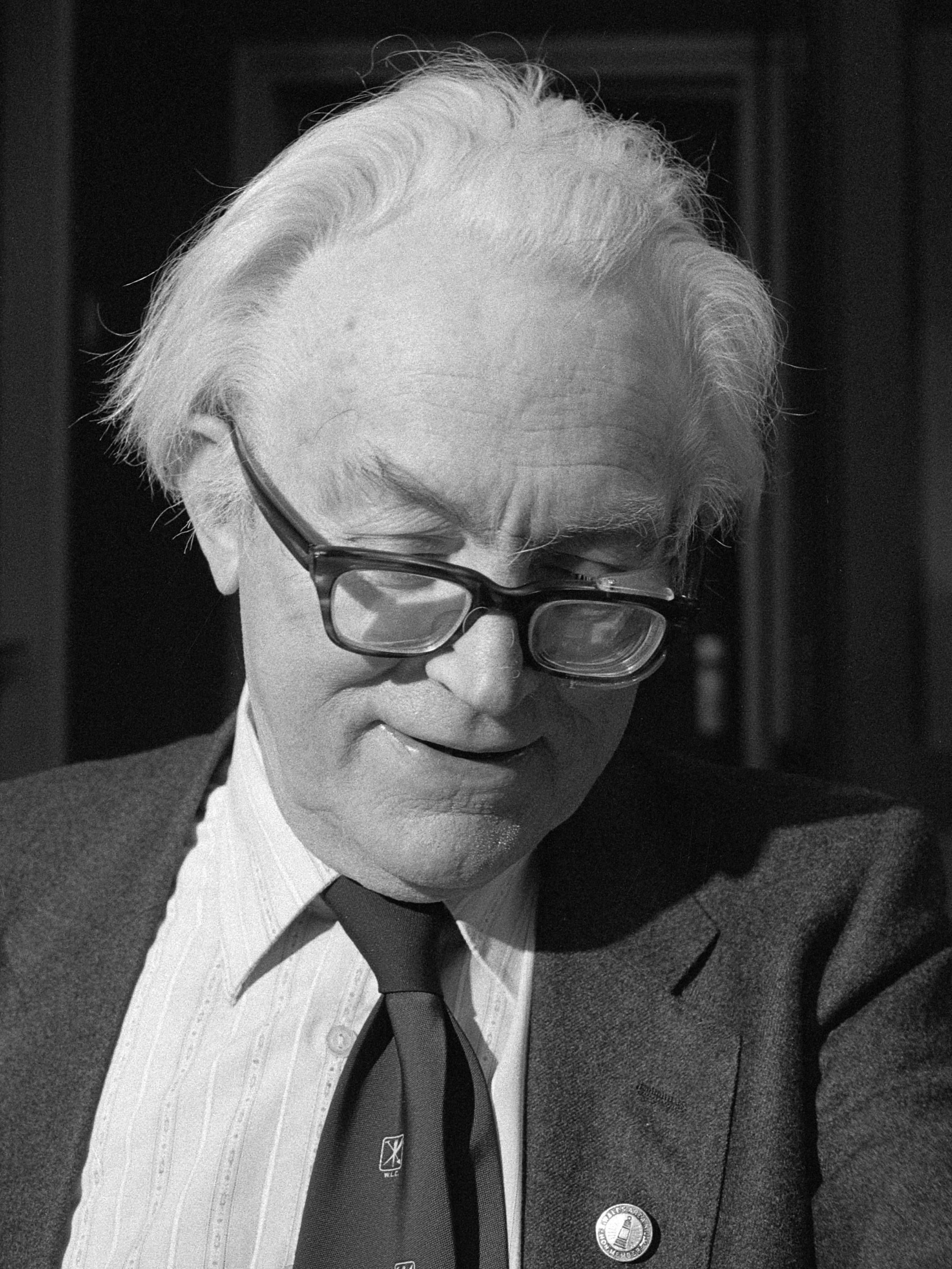
Michael Foot, leader of the party in opposition (1980–83)

The aftermath of the 1979 election defeat saw a period of bitter internal rivalry in the Labour Party which had become increasingly divided between the ever more dominant left wingers under Michael Foot and Tony Benn (whose supporters dominated the party organisation at the grassroots level), and the right under Denis Healey. It was widely considered that Healey would win the 1980 leadership election, but he was narrowly defeated by Foot, who succeeded Callaghan as party leader late in 1980.

The Thatcher government was determined not to be deflected from its agenda as the Heath government had been. A deflationary budget in 1980 led to substantial cuts in welfare spending and an initial short-term sharp rise in unemployment. The Conservatives reduced or eliminated state assistance for struggling private industries, leading to large redundancies in many regions of the country, notably in Labour's heartlands. However, Conservative legislation extending the right for residents to buy council houses from the state proved very attractive to many Labour voters. (Labour had previously suggested this idea in their 1970 election manifesto, but had never acted on it.)

The election of Campaign for Nuclear Disarmament (CND) veteran Michael Foot to the leadership disturbed many Atlanticists in the party. Other changes increased their concern; the constituencies were given the ability to easily deselect sitting MPs, and a new voting system in leadership elections was introduced that gave party activists and affiliated trade unions a vote in different parts of an electoral college.

The party's move to the left in the early 1980s led to the decision by a number of centrist party members led by the Gang of Four of former Labour cabinet ministers (Shirley Williams, Bill Rodgers, Roy Jenkins, and David Owen) to form the breakaway Social Democratic Party (SDP) on 25 January 1981. The broader aims of the party were set out in the Limehouse Declaration the following day.

In 1981 the St Ermin's group of senior trade union leaders was created, meeting secretly every month initially at the St. Ermin's Hotel, who organised to prevent the Bennite left taking over the party. Four MPs also attended, Denis Howell, John Golding, Denis Healey and Giles Radice. The group was created following the 1981 special conference decision to establish an electoral college (40% trade unions, 30% members, 30% MPs) to elect the Labour Party leader and deputy rather than the Parliamentary Labour Party choosing. A major effort of the group was to use union block votes to overturn the left's majority on the Labour National Executive Committee and the Trades Union Congress general council.

The departure of members from the centre and right further swung the party to the left, but not quite enough to allow Tony Benn to be elected as Deputy Leader when he challenged for the job at the September 1981 party conference. The party was so split that its third-place finish in the 1982 Glasgow Hillhead by-election reportedly pleased some right-wing backbenchers, who expected that the poor result would help them defeat the Bennites.

Under Foot's leadership, the party's agenda became increasingly dominated by the politics of the hard left. Accordingly, the party went into the 1983 general election with the most left wing manifesto that Labour ever stood upon. It was indeed dubbed by the Labour MP Gerald Kaufman as "the longest suicide note in history".

The manifesto contained pledges for abolition of the House of Lords, unilateral nuclear disarmament, withdrawal from the European Economic Community, withdrawal from NATO and a radical and extensive extension of state control over the economy and financial institutions.

This alienated many of the party's more right-wing supporters. The Bennites were in the ascendency and there was very little that the right could do to resist or water down the manifesto, many also hoped that a landslide defeat would discredit Michael Foot and the hard left of the party moving Labour away from explicit Socialism and towards weaker social-democracy.

Much of the press, particularly the sections backing the Conservative government of Margaret Thatcher, attacked both the Labour Party's manifesto and its style of campaigning, which tended to rely upon public meetings and canvassing rather than media. By contrast, the Conservatives ran a professional campaign which played on the voters' fears of a repeat of the Winter of Discontent. To add to this, the Thatcher government's popularity rose sharply on a wave of patriotic feeling following victory in the Falklands War in June 1982, allowing it to recover from its initial unpopularity over unemployment and economic difficulty. Indeed, Margaret Thatcher felt confident to call a general election for June 1983 despite not being obliged to do so for a further 12 months.

At the 1983 election, Labour suffered a landslide defeat, winning only 27.6% of the vote and securing just 209 seats. This was their worst performance at a general election since 1918. Labour won only half a million votes more than the SDP–Liberal Alliance, which had attracted the votes of many moderate Labour supporters, although the Alliance only won 23 seats. Michael Foot criticised the Alliance for "siphoning" Labour support and allowing the Conservatives to win more seats.

=== Neil Kinnock ===
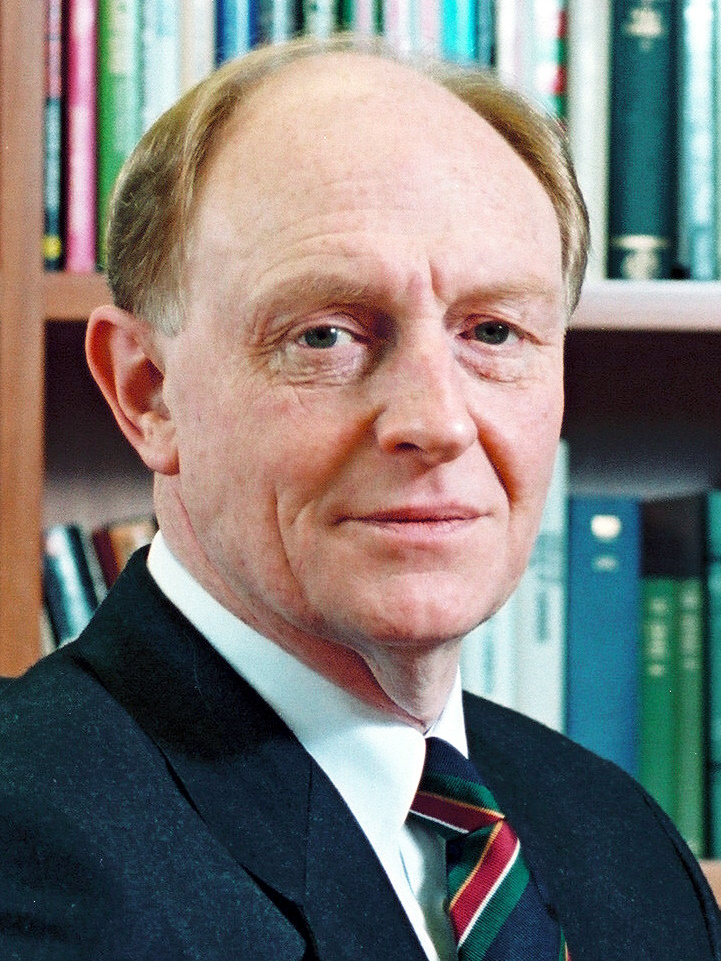
Neil Kinnock, leader of the party in opposition (1983–92)

Michael Foot resigned and was replaced as leader by Neil Kinnock who was elected on 2 October 1983 and progressively moved the party towards the centre. Labour improved its performance in the 1987 general election, gaining 20 seats and so reducing the Conservative majority from 144 to 102. They were now firmly established as the second political party in Britain as the Alliance had once again failed to make a breakthrough with seats and it subsequently collapsed, prompting a merger of the SDP and Liberals to form the Liberal Democrats.

The 1970s and early 1980s were significant for Labour in the rise of left-wing Labour councils (derided by their opponents as the "loony left") which emphasised improvements in housing and amenities, participation and rights for women and minorities, workers' control, decentralisation, and opposition to neoliberalism. The left regarded local councils as part of an extra-parliamentary mode of opposition, alongside community groups and town halls. David Blunkett, once a member of Labour's left-wing, described Labour town halls as "a rudimentary opposition movement against the ruling party in Westminster." The left councils greatly advanced the cause of blacks, women, and homosexuals within the political system, while also opening up council-decision making.

Increasingly, some Labour councils were radicalised to act in open defiance of the Thatcher Government. Instead of cutting expenditure, they raised rates and all kinds of borrowing and lease-back arrangements were entered into with overseas banks and private financial institutions in order to sustain capital programmes. The increased radicalisation of Labour councils during this period could be attributed to the policies of the Thatcher Government, which involved reductions in government financial aid to both council housing and local authorities, together with a change in the government's allocation formula so that local authority areas of high expenditure were disproportionately affected. As noted by Peter Shore,

Since the areas of critical housing need were invariably Labour-controlled, as were the high-spending councils where social needs of all kinds were at their greatest, it was Labour councils in inner-city areas that were targeted to take the full brunt of government expenditure cuts.

The Greater London Council, under the leadership of Ken Livingstone from 1981 to 1986, carried out a number of progressive policies such as a programme of grants to voluntary groups (which cost £47 million in 1984–85: £100 million in 1999 prices) and a "Fares Fair" policy, which cut London Transport fares by 25%. Although this policy was controversially ruled out by a House of Lords judgement, it was replaced by a more subtle cheap fares policy before London Transport was removed from GLC control by the government in 1984.

In 1983, the Liverpool Labour party (then under the effective control of the Trotskyist Militant tendency) embarked upon an ambitious programme of municipal reform. Apart from promoting propaganda for class conflict, as characterised by continual protests and "days of action" in which council workers and even school pupils were encouraged to participate, the Liverpool City Council devoted much time and effort to improving the quality of the inner-city environment. New houses were constructed, while new parks, sports centres, and other leisure facilities were created. In addition, within a short period of time, 8,000 housing units were refurbished and 4,000 units had been built. Altogether, the results were an improvement on previous councils run by all parties. Following the 1987 election, Kinnock resumed the expulsion of Militant's members from the party which had begun under his predecessor.

During the course of the 1980s, the GLC and several other Labour councils attempted to promote local economic recovery by setting up a network of enterprise boards and agencies. In addition, the GLC, Glasgow, Liverpool, Sheffield, and smaller London councils like Lambeth, Camden, and Islington adopted policies that challenged the Thatcher Government's insistence on budgetary cuts and privatisation.

The Labour councils in old metropolitan counties of West Midlands, South Yorkshire, Greater London, and Greater Manchester led the way in developing interventionist economic policies. In these metropolitan county areas, Inward Investment Agencies, Enterprise Boards, Low Pay Units, and Co-operative Development Agencies proliferated, while parts of the country such as Salford Quays and Cardiff Bay were redeveloped. The Labour Birmingham City Council in the 1980s worked to diversify the business visitor economy, as characterised by the decision to build a new, purpose-built convention centre in a decaying, inner-city district around Broad Street. By the mid-1990s, the success of this strategy was evident by the success of the International convention centre leading to wider redevelopment, as characterised by the building of a Sea Life Centre, the National Indoor Arena, bars, hotels, and thousands of newly constructed and refurbished flats and houses. This helped to revitalise the city centre and brought in people and money to both and the city and the West Midlands region as a whole.

During the 1980s and 1990s, Labour councils vied to attract inward investment and build themselves up as tourist and retail centres. The relatively left-wing Labour Southampton City Council was popular among property developers for its ambitious city centre plans, while the labour council in Sheffield set up a partnership with businesses in order to redevelop a large part of the city that had been abandoned by the decline of the steel industry. Some Labour councils also remedied the neglect of management and service delivery during the mid-1980s under the Thatcher Government and introduced charters and guaranteed standards of service for local residents before a similar "Citizen's Charter" was launched by the Major Government.

In November 1990, Margaret Thatcher resigned as prime minister and was succeeded by John Major. Most opinion polls had shown Labour comfortably ahead of the Conservatives in the 18 months leading up to Thatcher's resignation, with the fall in Tory support blamed largely on the introduction of the unpopular poll tax, combined with the fact that the economy was sliding into recession at the time. One of the reasons Thatcher gave for her resignation was that she felt the Conservatives would stand a better chance of re-election with a new leader at the helm.

The change of leader in the Tory government saw a turnaround in support for the Conservatives, who regularly topped the opinion polls throughout 1991 in spite of the continuing recession, although Labour regained the lead of the polls more than once that year. John Major resisted calls within parliament to hold a general election throughout 1991.

The "yo yo" in the opinion polls continued into 1992, though after November 1990 any Labour lead in the polls was rarely sufficient for a majority, suggesting that Labour could only rule as a minority government or in coalition with other parties. Major resisted Kinnock's calls for a general election throughout 1991. Kinnock campaigned on the theme "It's Time for a Change", urging voters to elect a new government after more than a decade of unbroken Conservative rule – which had seen two recessions. However, the Conservatives themselves had undergone a dramatic change in the change of leader from Margaret Thatcher to John Major, at least in terms of style if not substance, whereas Kinnock was now the longest serving leader of any of the major political parties at the time, and the longest-serving opposition leader in British political history.

From the outset, it was clearly a well-received change, as Labour's 14-point lead in the November 1990 "Poll of Polls" was replaced by an 8% Tory lead a month later.

The 1992 general election on 9 April was widely tipped to result in a hung parliament or a narrow Labour majority, but in the event the Conservatives were returned to power, though with a much reduced majority of 21, despite the Conservative mandate being at a record of more than 14 million votes. Despite the increased number of seats and votes, it was still an incredibly disappointing result for members and supporters of the Labour party, and there was serious doubt among the public and the media as to whether Labour could ever return to government, just as there had been back in 1959, while at the same time there were doubts with the Conservative Party as to whether a fifth successive election victory was a likelihood.

Even before the country went to the polls, it seemed doubtful as to whether Labour could win a parliamentary majority as an 8% electoral swing was needed across the country for this to be achieved. When Labour lost the election, there was widespread public and media debate as to whether the party could ever return to government, as had happened in 1959, not least due to the fact that it had failed to beat an incumbent Conservative government during a time of recession and high unemployment – an economic climate which would normally be expected to result in a change of government.

In the party's inquiry into why it had lost, it was considered that the "Shadow Budget" announced by John Smith had opened the way for Conservatives to attack the party for wanting to raise taxes. In addition, a triumphalist party rally held in Sheffield eight days before the election, was generally considered to have backfired. The party had also suffered from a powerfully co-ordinated campaign from the right-wing press, particularly Rupert Murdoch's Sun newspaper. Kinnock, who in particular had been vilified by The Sun with headlines including "Nightmare on Kinnock Street" and the election day front-page headline "If Kinnock wins today will the last person to leave Britain please turn out the lights", resigned after the defeat, blaming the right-wing media for Labour's failure to win the election.

=== John Smith ===
John Smith was elected to succeed Kinnock in July 1992 despite his involvement with the Shadow Budget.

Smith's leadership once again saw the re-emergence of tension between those on the party's left and those identified as "modernisers", both of whom advocated radical revisions of the party's stance albeit in different ways. At the 1993 conference, Smith successfully changed the party rules and lessened the influence of the trade unions on the selection of candidates to stand for Parliament by introducing a one member, one vote system called OMOV – but only barely, following a barnstorming speech by John Prescott which required Smith to compromise on other individual negotiations.

The Black Wednesday economic disaster in September 1992, which led to Britain's exit from the European Exchange Rate Mechanism, left the Conservative government's reputation for monetary excellence in shreds, and by the end of that year Labour had a comfortable lead over the Conservatives in the opinion polls. Although the recession was declared over in April 1993 and a period of strong and sustained economic growth followed, coupled with a relatively swift fall in unemployment, the Labour lead in the opinion polls remained strong.

The growing strength of the Labour Party during the 1990s was demonstrated by its success in preventing the passage of two major policy initiatives of the Major Government. Plans to privatise Royal Mail were abandoned as a result of pressure from Labour, the Communications Workers Union and voters in Conservative rural heartlands who sought to protect post office services. Another major policy abandonment came as a result of Norman Lamont's 1993 announcement that VAT on domestic fuel and lighting would be introduced, starting at a rate of 8% in April 1994 and reaching the full rate the following April. The Labour Party launched a massive public campaign against the controversial tax, collecting 1.5 million signatures on a petition. An important House of Commons vote on introducing the second stage of the tax took place in December 1994. Concerted pressure was put on Conservative backbenchers from marginal seats to vote against the controversial tax, and in the end the Major Government was narrowly defeated, with 319 voting against the tax compared to 311 for. This not only represented a victory for the Labour party's campaign, but it further demonstrated Labour's social democratic credentials and its growing political strength. During this period party membership increased dramatically, rising from 305,000 in 1994 to a high point of 405,000 in 1998.

John Smith died suddenly on 12 May 1994 of a severe heart attack, prompting a leadership election for his successor, likely to be the next Prime Minister. With 57% of the vote, Tony Blair won a resounding victory in a three-way contest with John Prescott and Margaret Beckett. Prescott became deputy leader, coming second in the poll, the results of which were announced on 21 July 1994.

== New Labour ==
=== Origins ===
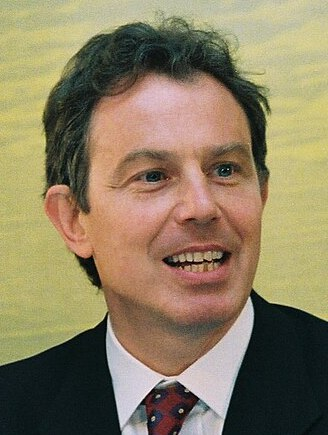
Tony Blair, Labour Prime Minister (1997–2007)

"New Labour" was an alternative branding for the Labour Party, used primarily during the period under Tony Blair's leadership. Being used first as a slogan, its first appearance in party literature was the 1996 draft manifesto, New Labour, New Life For Britain. The rise of the name coincided with a rightwards shift of the British political spectrum; for Labour, this was a continuation of the trend that had begun under the leadership of Neil Kinnock. "Old Labour" is sometimes used by commentators to describe the older, more left-wing members of the party, or those with strong Trade Union connections.

Tony Blair, Gordon Brown, Peter Mandelson, Anthony Giddens and Alastair Campbell are most commonly cited as the creators and architects of "New Labour". Blair proposed a rewrite of Clause IV of the party constitution, abandoning the party's commitments and what Blair referred to as "state socialism" (as opposed to ethical socialism). The party became an advocate of the shift in European social democracy during the 1990s, known as the "Third Way". Although this policy was advantageous to the Labour Party in the eyes of the British electorate, it alienated many grassroots members by distancing itself from the ideals of socialism in favour of free market policy decisions.

The "modernisation" of Labour Party policy and the unpopularity of John Major's Conservative government, along with a well co-ordinated use of PR, greatly increased Labour's appeal to "middle England". The party was concerned not to put off potential voters who had previously supported the Conservatives, and pledged to keep to the spending plans of the previous government, and not to increase the basic rate of income tax. The party won the 1997 election with a landslide majority of 179. Following a second and third election victory in the 2001 election and the 2005 election, the name has diminished in significance. "New Labour" as a name has no official status but remains in common use to distinguish modernisers from those holding to more traditional positions who normally are referred to as "Old Labour".

Many of the traditional grassroots working-class members of the Labour Party who became upset and disillusioned with "New Labour" left the Party and went on to join political parties such as the Socialist Party, the Socialist Labour Party and even the Communist Party of Great Britain – all parties claiming to never neglect the "ordinary British people". David Osler, the journalist and author of "Labour Party plc" seems to hint in his book that Labour's supposed steady shift from Socialism and its neglect of support for the working-class people of Britain began to show during the Party's years under Harold Wilson. In the book, Osler claims that the Party is now only a socialist party and indeed a "Labour" party in name only, and is now a capitalism-embracing Party which differs little from the Conservative Party. Other historians have argued that Old Labour's record in putting its social democratic ideals into practice was less successful than comparable northern European parties.

=== 1997–2010: In government ===
The Labour Party won the 1997 general election with a landslide majority of 179; it was the largest Labour majority ever, and the largest swing to a political party achieved since 1945. Over the next decade, a wide range of progressive social reforms were enacted, with millions lifted out of poverty during Labour's time in office largely as a result of various tax and benefit reforms. Labour's time in office also saw a steady rise in living standards, with real earnings for all employees going up by about 18% between 1997 and 2009.

Amongst the early acts of Tony Blair's government were the establishment of the national minimum wage, the devolution of power to Scotland, Wales and Northern Ireland and the reestablishment of a city-wide governing body for London, the Greater London Authority, with its own electedMayor. Combined with a Conservative opposition that had yet to organise effectively under William Hague, as well as Blair's continuing popularity, Labour went on to win the 2001 election with a similar majority, dubbed the "quiet landslide" by the media.

Total funding per pupil was increased by over £300 million in real terms between 1997 and 2001, whilst the number of 5-, 6- and 7-year-olds taught in classes of over 30 was reduced by 450,000 during that same period. 5,000 more nurse training places were established from 1997 to 2001, whilst pay for nurses was increased by three times more than inflation during that same period of time. Charges on eye tests for older people were abolished and the National Foundation of Youth Music was established to provide children with after-school musical activities and training. Supporters Direct was established to assist football fans in establishing mutual trusts to enable them to take "a greater financial stake in their clubs and have a greater say in how they are run". The average wait from arrest to sentencing for young offenders was reduced from 142 days to less than 100 days, the Stephen Lawrence Inquiry was established and new offences of racially aggravated violence, harassment and criminal damage were introduced. The School Standards and Framework Act 1998 included policy developments such as action to raise school standards, a new framework of community, foundation and voluntary schools, and measures to reduce class sizes for 5-year-olds. As a means of improving primary school standards, a daily literacy hour and a National Numeracy Strategy were introduced. Additionally, free nursery places for four-year-olds were introduced.

Pension Credit (an additional income benefit for senior citizens) was introduced, together with Educational Maintenance Allowances, which enabled students from poorer backgrounds to stay in education for longer. £37 billion was invested in a Decent Homes programme, aimed at improving the conditions of run-down council homes, with installations of central heating, new kitchens and bathrooms. As a result of this initiative, by 2009 8% of England's total social housing stock was considered to be unfit, compared with 39% in 2001. The New Deal programme found work for half-a-million long-term unemployed young people, although studies highlighted concerns over the effect of stricter conditions for unemployment benefit on single younger men. Between 1997 and 2009, cash spending on education was doubled, representing a real-terms increase of three-quarters. Across England, primary school expenditure on each pupil increased from £2210 in 1997–98 to £3580 by 2007–08 in real terms, a rise of a third. From 2000 onwards, spending on the NHS doubled in real terms, while Agenda for Change led to improved pay scales within the organisation. In addition, much was done to enhance the level of public services. As noted by one study

Labour bequeathed a public realm that shone. They renovated, restocked and rebuilt schools, hospitals and clinics, arts and sports venues, parks and museums. J.K. Galbraith once talked about private affluence and public squalor; now there was plenty of the former, despite the recession, but much less of the latter. Public spaces no longer felt second-best or the shabby poor relations of commerce. Sober academics talked of a renaissance of England's northern cities, and you could say the same of Glasgow and Belfast. For years to come, civic buildings will stand as monuments to the Labour era.

A perceived turning point was when Tony Blair controversially allied himself with US President George W. Bush in supporting the Iraq War, which caused him to lose much of his political support. The UN Secretary-General, among many, considered the war illegal. The Iraq War was deeply unpopular in most western countries, with Western governments divided in their support and under pressure from worldwide popular protests. At the 2005 election, Labour was re-elected for a third term, but with a reduced majority of 66. The decisions that led up to the Iraq war and its subsequent conduct were the subject of Sir John Chilcot's Iraq Inquiry.

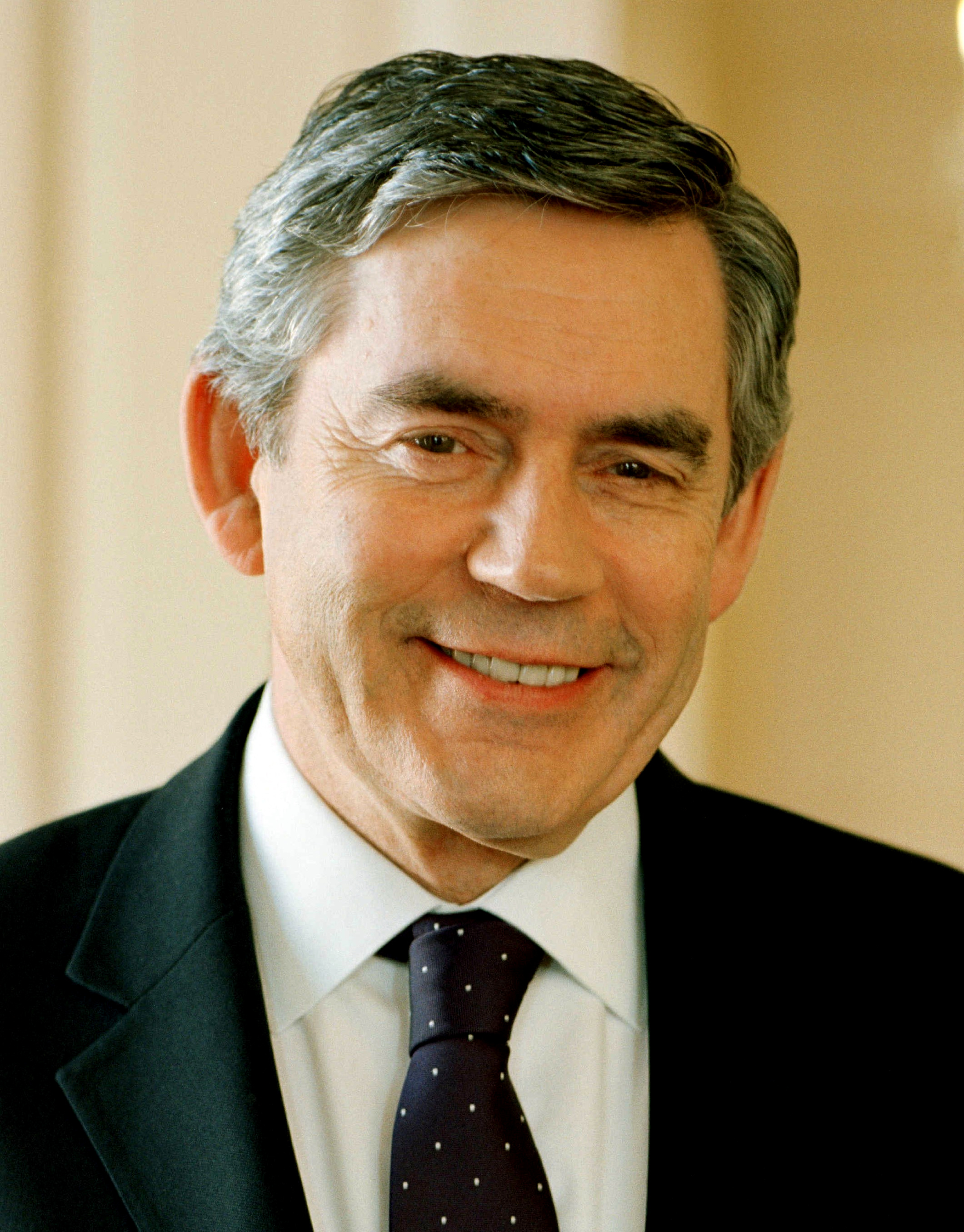
Gordon Brown, Labour Prime Minister (2007–2010)

Tony Blair announced in September 2006 that he would quit as leader within the year, though he had been under pressure to quit earlier than May 2007 in order to get a new leader in place before the May elections which were expected to be disastrous for Labour. In the event, the party did lose power in Scotland to a minority Scottish National Party government at the 2007 elections and, shortly after this, Tony Blair resigned as prime minister and was replaced by his Chancellor, Gordon Brown. Although the party experienced a brief rise in the polls after this, its popularity soon slumped to its lowest level since the days of Michael Foot. During May 2008, Labour suffered heavy defeats in the London mayoral election, local elections and the loss in the Crewe and Nantwich by-election, culminating in the party registering its worst ever opinion poll result since records began in 1943, of 23%, with many citing Brown's leadership as a key factor. Membership of the party also reached a low ebb, falling to 156,205 by the end of 2009: over 40 per cent of the 405,000 peak reached in 1997 and thought to be the lowest total since the party was founded.

Finance proved a major problem for the Labour Party during this period; a "cash for peerages" scandal under Tony Blair resulted in the drying up of many major sources of donations. Declining party membership, partially due to the reduction of activists' influence upon policy-making under the reforms of Neil Kinnock and Tony Blair, also contributed to financial problems. Between January and March 2008, the Labour Party received just over £3 million in donations and were £17 million in debt; compared to the Conservatives' £6 million in donations and £12 million in debt.

In the 2010 general election on 6 May that year, Labour with 29.0% of the vote won the second largest number of seats (258). The Conservatives with 36.5% of the vote won the largest number of seats (307), but no party had an overall majority, meaning that Labour could still remain in power if they managed to form a coalition with at least one smaller party. However, the Labour Party would have had to form a coalition with more than one other smaller party to gain an overall majority; anything less would result in a minority government. On 10 May 2010, after talks to form a coalition with the Liberal Democrats broke down, Gordon Brown announced his intention to stand down as Leader before the Labour Party Conference but a day later resigned as both Prime Minister and party leader.

== 2010–2024: Opposition and internal conflict ==
=== Ed Miliband ===
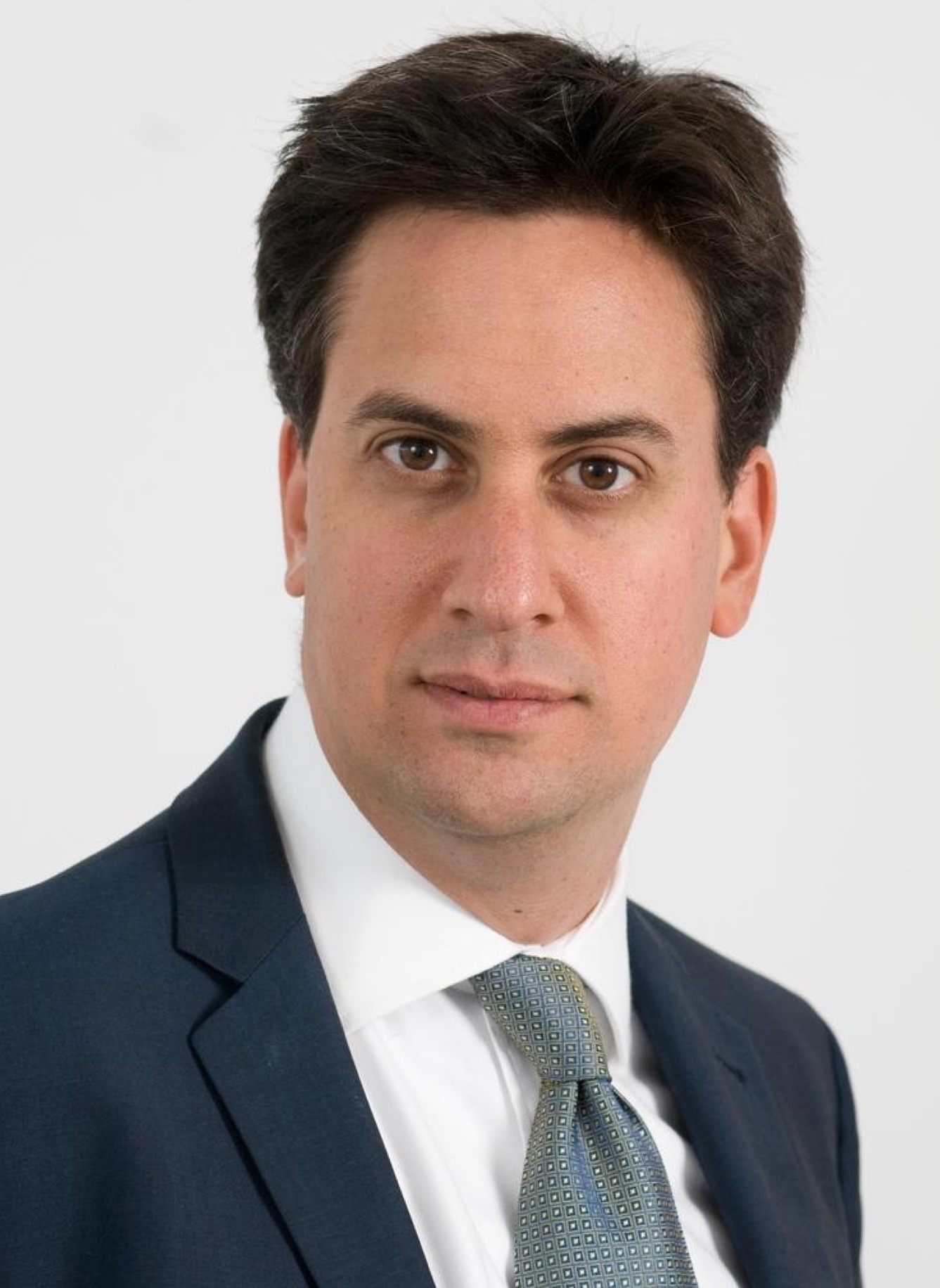
Ed Miliband, leader of the party in opposition (2010–2015)

Harriet Harman became the Leader of the Opposition and acting Leader of the Labour Party following the resignation of Gordon Brown on 11 May 2010, pending a leadership election subsequently won by Ed Miliband. This period has to date witnessed a revival in Labour's opinion poll fortunes, with the first Labour lead recorded since the commencement of Gordon Brown's premiership in 2007 being reported in a YouGov poll for The Sun on 27 September 2010 during the 2010 Labour Party Conference. This phenomenon has been speculatively attributed to the sharp decline in Liberal Democrat support since May 2010, with disillusioned Liberal Democrat supporters defecting their support to Labour. Such poll leads, up to 6% above the Conservatives in a 20 December 2010 opinion poll, are in contrast to Ed Miliband's low public satisfaction ratings; +1% in an Ipsos MORI poll, interpreted by a spokesperson for the said pollster as "...bad news for Ed Miliband. We have to go back to Michael Foot who led the party to a crushing defeat in 1983 to find a lower satisfaction rating at this stage". Foot, in fact, had actually enjoyed a lead in the opinion polls over the Conservatives wide enough to win an election with a majority of up to 130 seats immediately after becoming leader in 1980, although that lead was wiped out in 1981 following the advent of the Social Democratic Party. In September 2010 the party reported a surge of 32,000 new members since the general election; at the end of 2011 this figure had reached 65,000 new members.

The Parliamentary Labour Party voted to abolish Shadow Cabinet elections at a meeting on 5 July 2011, ratified by the National Executive Committee and Party Conference. Henceforth the leader of the party chose the Shadow Cabinet members. As a result, the 2010 Shadow Cabinet election was the last.

Miliband emphasised "responsible capitalism" and greater state intervention to change the balance of the UK economy away from financial services. Tackling vested interests and opening up closed circles in British society were also themes he returned to a number of times. Miliband also argued for greater regulation on banks and the energy companies.

Blue Labour was a recent ideological tendency in the party that advocates the belief that working class voters will be won back to Labour through more conservative policies on certain social and international issues, such as immigration and crime, a rejection of neoliberal economics in favour of ideas from guild socialism and continental corporatism, and a switch to local and democratic community management and provision of services, rather than relying on a traditional welfare state that is seen as excessively 'bureaucratic'. These ideas have been given an endorsement by Ed Miliband who in 2011 wrote the preface to a book expounding Blue Labour's positions. However, it lost its influence after comments by Maurice Glasman in the Telegraph newspaper.

Despite its years in opposition, Labour has nevertheless continued to be active on a local level, introducing measures such as free breakfasts in schools, schemes to tackle fuel poverty, new apprenticeship opportunities, financial support for students in education, and the building of social housing units. The party's performance held up in local elections in 2012 with Labour consolidating its position in the North and Midlands, while also regaining some ground in Southern England.

Labour's decline in Scotland's parliamentary election in 2011 presaged greater losses as part of the party's defeat in the 2015 general election. With the party bidding to return to government in Westminster under the leadership of Ed Miliband, Labour gained more than 20 seats in England and Wales, mostly from the Liberal Democrats but also from the Conservative Party, although several of its MPs lost reelection to Conservative challengers, including Ed Balls. However, the fall of what was popularly dubbed Labour's "Scottish fortress" to the Scottish National Party turned out 40 Labour MPs from their seats, including Scottish Labour leader Jim Murphy. Discounting pickups, the party lost 48 seats in total throughout Great Britain, falling to 232 seats in the House of Commons.

=== Jeremy Corbyn ===
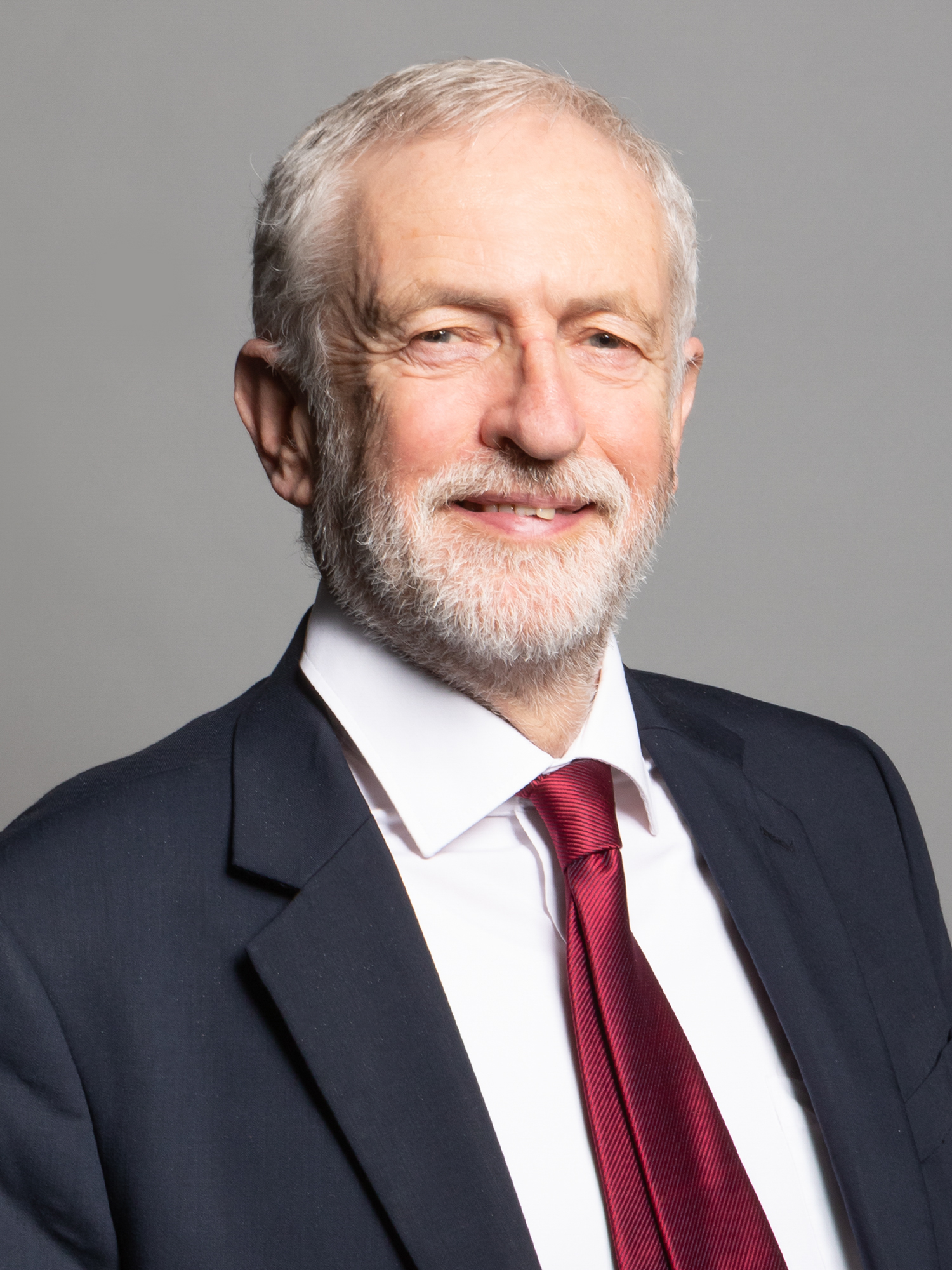
Jeremy Corbyn, leader of the party in opposition (2015–2020)

The day after the 7 May 2015 election, Miliband resigned as party leader. Harriet Harman again took charge as interim leader. Following a leadership election, Jeremy Corbyn was announced as the new party leader on 12 September 2015. Corbyn, then a member of the Socialist Campaign Group and a fixture of the party's left, was considered little more than a fringe hopeful when the contest began, but benefited from a large influx of new members as well as the registration of significant numbers of the new affiliated and registered classes of voting supporters introduced under Miliband. Corbyn received the backing of only 16 of the party's MPs. Membership numbers continued to climb after the start of Corbyn's leadership.

Tensions soon developed in the parliamentary party over Corbyn's leadership. Following the referendum on EU membership more than two dozen members of the Shadow Cabinet resigned in late June 2016, and a no-confidence vote was supported by 172 MPs against 40 supporting Corbyn. On 11 July 2016 an official leadership election was called as Angela Eagle launched a challenge against Corbyn. She was soon joined by rival challenger Owen Smith, prompting Eagle to withdraw on 19 July 2016 in order to ensure there was only one challenger on the ballot. On 24 September 2016 Corbyn retained leadership of the party with an increased share of the vote. By the end of the contest Labour's membership had grown to more than 500,000, making it the largest political party in terms of membership in Western Europe.

Following the party's decision to support the European Union (Notification of Withdrawal) Bill 2017, at least three shadow cabinet ministers, all representing constituencies which voted to remain in the EU, resigned from their position as a result of the party's decision to invoke Article 50 under the bill. 47 of 229 Labour MPs voted against the bill (in defiance of the party's three-line whip). Unusually, the rebel frontbenchers did not face immediate dismissal.

On 18 April 2017, the Prime Minister Theresa May announced she would seek an unexpected snap election on 8 June 2017. Corbyn said he welcomed May's proposal and said his party would support the government's move in the parliamentary vote announced for 19 April. The necessary super-majority of two-thirds was achieved when 522 of the 650 Members of Parliament voted in support. Some of the opinion polls had shown a 20-point Conservative lead over Labour before the election was called, but this lead had narrowed by the day of the 2017 general election, which resulted in a hung parliament. Despite remaining in opposition for its third election in a row, Labour at 40.0% won its greatest share of the vote since 2001, made a net gain of 30 seats to reach 262 total MPs, and achieved the biggest percentage-point increase in its vote share in a single general election since 1945. Immediately following the election party membership rose by 35,000.

Following the large increase in party membership with Corbyn becoming leader, membership fees became the largest component of party income, overtaking trade unions donations which had previously been of most financial importance. This increase made Labour the most financially well-off British political party in 2017. This large membership also in 2018 ensured that the NEC was firmly under pro-Corbyn control, when all nine constituency members were elected from the pro-Corbyn slate; previously such control had not been entirely secure. Parliamentary candidates selected in this period were more likely to be aligned with the Labour Party's 'progressive' faction.

In the 2019 general election, Labour's vote share fell to 32%, leading to a net loss of 60 seats and leaving it with 202, its fewest since 1935. Corbyn subsequently announced he would not lead Labour into the next election. On 18 December, Blair accused Corbyn of not having a clear position on Brexit unlike his Conservative opponent Boris Johnson who supported withdrawal from the European Union and the Liberal Democrats that were strictly pro-European, thus dividing voters who supported Remain in the 2016 referendum while the Brexit Party under Nigel Farage did not do the same with Vote Leave, ending up without seats in the House of Commons despite achieving a decisive victory in the United Kingdom elections for the European Parliament.

== 2024–present: Return to government ==
=== Keir Starmer ===
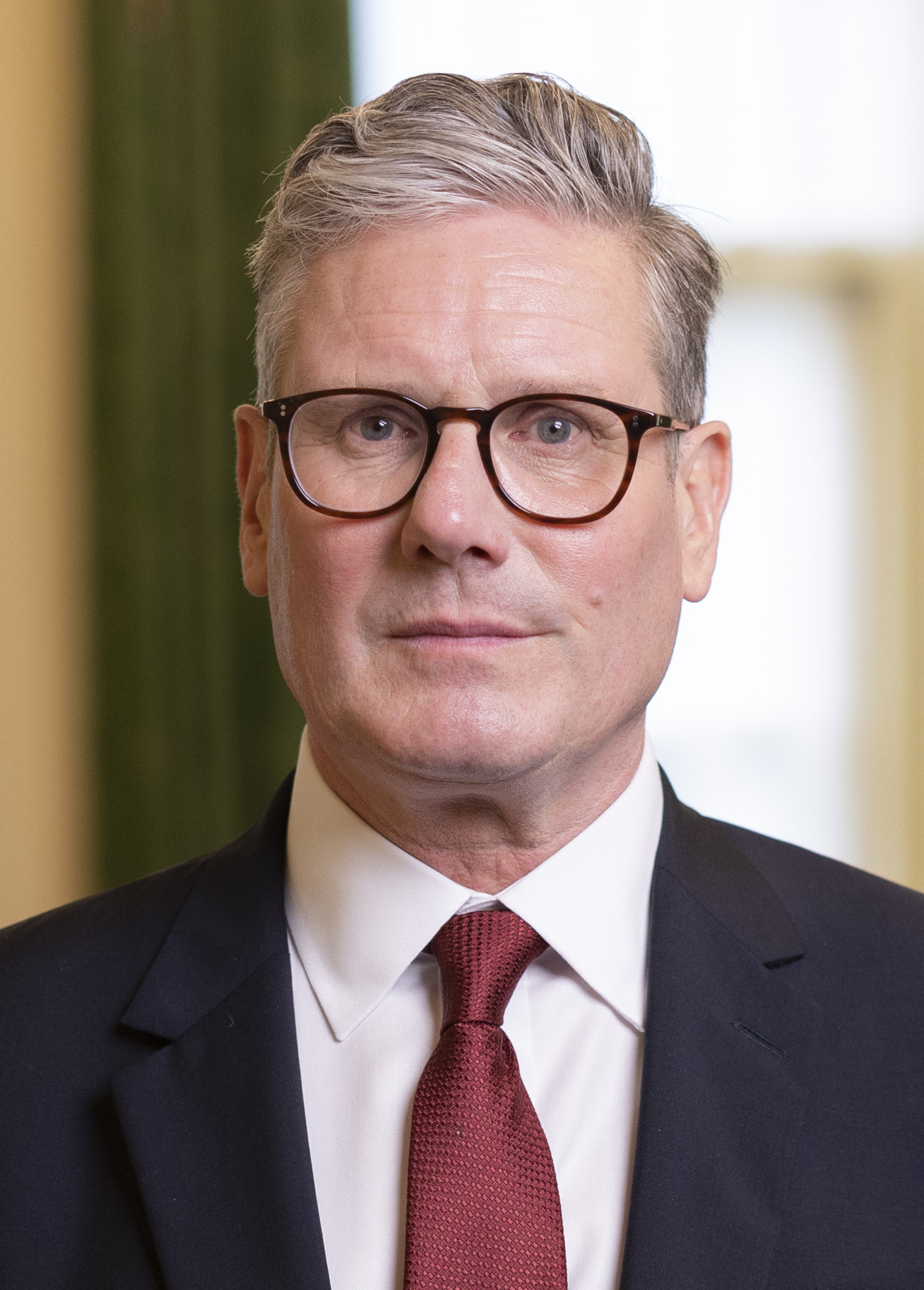
Keir Starmer, Labour Prime Minister (2024–2026)

On 4 April 2020, Keir Starmer was elected as Leader of the Labour Party amidst the COVID-19 pandemic. During his tenure as opposition leader, Starmer repositioned the party from the left toward the centre-left and political centre, and emphasised the importance of eliminating antisemitism within the party. Starmer led Labour to victory in the local elections in 2023 and 2024. In 2023, Starmer set out five missions for his government, targeting issues such as economic growth, health, clean energy, crime and education.

During the 2024 general election, Labour maintained a strong poll lead, with its manifesto focusing on economic growth, planning system reform, infrastructure, clean energy, healthcare, education, childcare, constitutional reform, and strengthening workers' rights.

Despite receiving half a million fewer votes than Corbyn did in 2019 Starmer led Labour to a landslide victory, ending fourteen years of Conservative government with Labour becoming the largest party in the House of Commons having won 63% of the seats with just 33.7% of the vote making this the lowest vote share of any party forming a majority government since World War II. The 59.7% turnout was the lowest since the 2001 general election. Labour gained 36 seats from the SNP, reestablishing dominance in Scotland.

He succeeded Rishi Sunak as prime minister on 5 July 2024, becoming the first Labour prime minister since Gordon Brown in 2010 and the first one to win a general election since Tony Blair at the 2005 general election. One of Starmer's first cabinet appointments was Rachel Reeves as Chancellor, which made her the first woman to hold the office.

On 5 September 2025, Angela Rayner resigned as deputy leader of the party after it was found that she had breached the ministerial code in relation to her failure to pay the correct amount of tax on one of her properties. This resulted in the election of Lucy Powell, who had just been removed from government by Starmer in a cabinet reshuffle, as Rayner's successor.

Opinion polls showed satisfaction with the Labour government and Starmer declining, and in September 2025 Ipsos indicated that Starmer was the most unpopular prime minister since Ipsos's records began in 1977, with 77% of the public dissatisfied with Starmer's job performance, and Reform UK holding a +12 points voting intention lead over Labour. In the February 2026 Gorton and Denton by-election the Green Party gained the seat from Labour who had held the sat in the area since 1931, which BBC elections analyst John Curtice described as "seismic" and of historic impact.

On 11 March 2026, the anniversary of the start of the Birmingham bin strike, Unite the Union cut its annual donation to the Labour Party by £580,000, a decrease of 40% from its previous funding of £1.45 million which was the largest union donation to Labour. The Labour controlled Birmingham City Council had decided to remove Waste Recycling and Collection Officer posts, and a dispute had been on-going for a year. The union stated a resolution of the dispute has been formulated at the Advisory, Conciliation and Arbitration Service (Acas), but the Labour-run council had not agreed to it. Unite's criticism of Labour extended beyond the Birmingham dispute, with Unite's General Secretary Sharon Graham saying "Unite members are coming to the end of the line as far as Labour is concerned. Workers are scratching their heads asking whose side are Labour on, who do they really represent, because it certainly isn’t workers." A periodic Unite rules conference will take place in 2027, which may consider whether the union should remain affiliated to the Labour Party.

In the 2026 local elections, Labour lost control of 38 councils. Dissatisfaction with Labour's results and discontent over policy and personnel issues led to calls for Starmer to resign as leader. On 14 May, Labour MP Josh Simons announced his resignation as Member of Parliament, triggering the 2026 Makerfield by-election so that the Mayor of Greater Manchester Andy Burnham could return to parliament and stand for the Labour leadership. Burnham won 54.8% of the vote, increasing Labour's majority in Makerfield to 9,231 votes, compared with Josh Simons' 5,399 vote majority over Reform UK at the 2024 general election.

On 22 June 2026, Starmer announced his intention to resign as Prime Minister and Leader of the Labour Party. The subsequent leadership election concluded on 17 July, with Andy Burnham becoming leader unopposed, and with overwhelming support from Labour MPs.

=== Andy Burnham ===
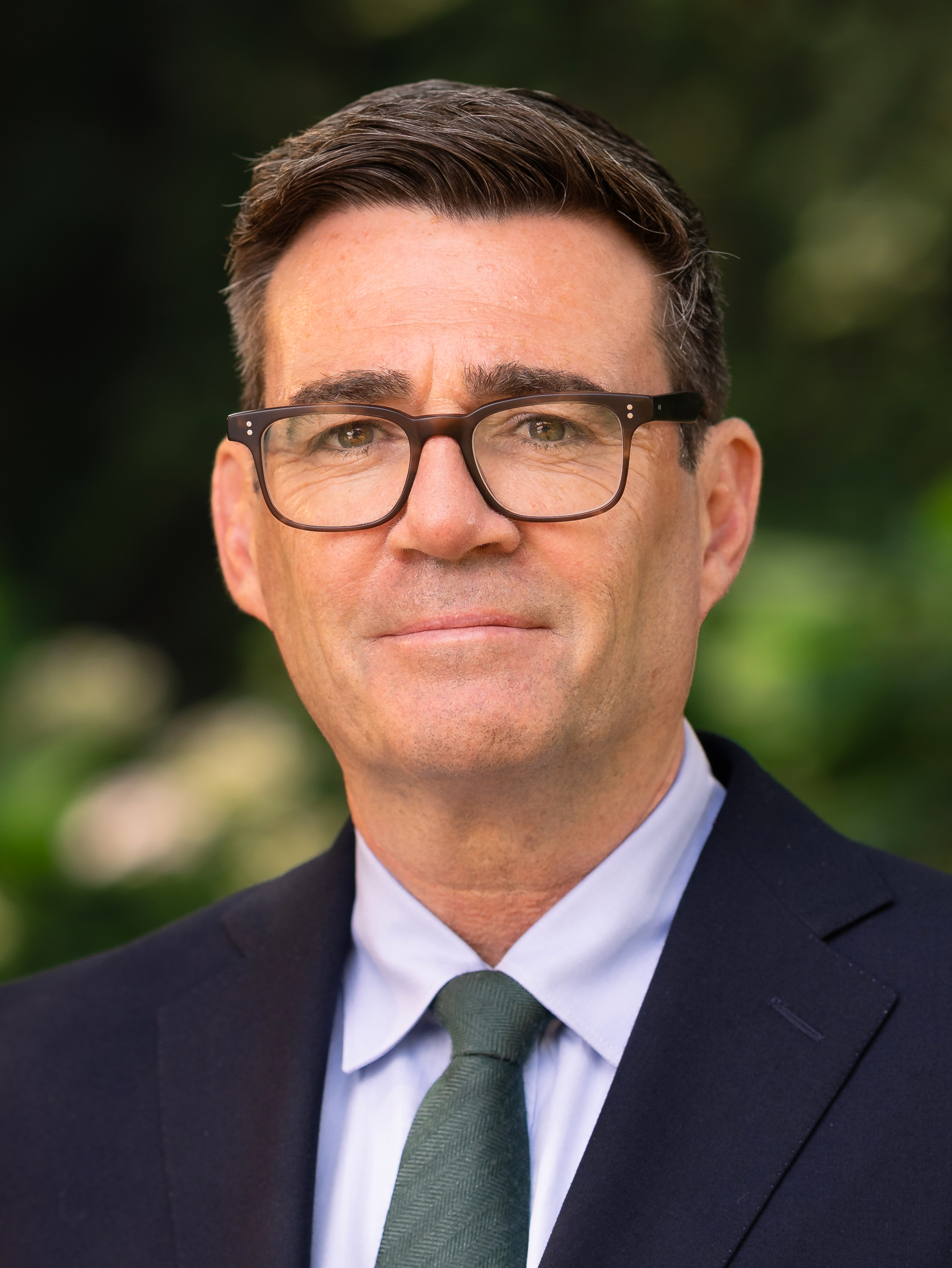
Andy Burnham, Labour Prime Minister (2026–present)

Upon taking office, Burnham became the first prime minister to belong to the Labour and Co-operative Party.

== See also ==
- List of Labour Party (UK) general election manifestos
- History of trade unions in the United Kingdom
- History of the welfare state in the United Kingdom
- Socialism in the United Kingdom
- History of the Conservative Party (UK)
- Liberal Democrats (UK) § History
