= David Osler =

British journalist, author and former blogger

David Osler (born 12 May 1960 in Whitechapel, London) is a British journalist, author and former blogger. He was educated at Wellingborough Grammar School, City of London Polytechnic and the London School of Economics.

Osler is finance editor of Lloyd's List, the world's oldest English-language daily newspaper. He had previously worked as news editor for Tribune, the Labour weekly, and for the Labour Research Department. His freelance contributions have appeared in The Guardian, The Observer, The Independent, Daily Telegraph, and the New Statesman.

In 2002, his book Labour Party Plc: New Labour as a Party of Business was published. He wrote a blog which was described by Conservative blogger Iain Dale as "brilliantly written and extremely insightful".

In 2007, he was sued for libel by political activist Johanna Kaschke for a blog article and reader comments which she claimed connected her to the Baader-Meinhof gang. The case was struck out in May 2010 by Justice Eady as an abuse of process. Kaschke was refused the right of appeal in September 2010.

In 2001 Osler won the Institute of Transport's Journalist of the year award, and in 2014 he won the Seahorse Club News Journalist of the year award. Osler has twice been highly commended in the Periodical Publishers Association business journalist of the year category, and was long listed for the Orwell Prize (blog section) in 2010 and 2011.
