= Dan Carden =

British politician (born 1986)

Dan Carden MP
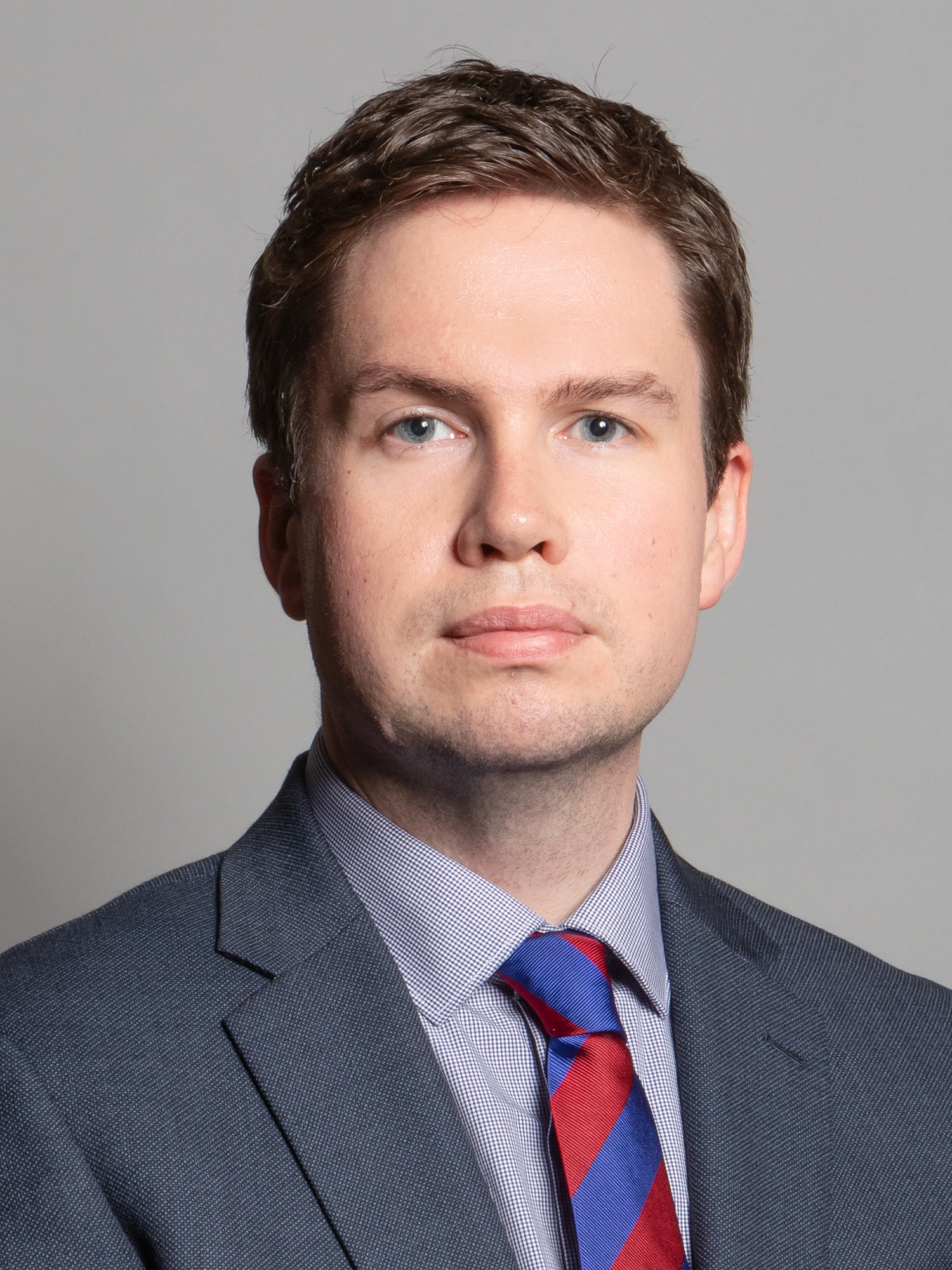
- Official portrait, 2020

Member of Parliament for Liverpool Walton
- Incumbent
- Assumed office 8 June 2017
- Preceded by: Steve Rotheram
- Majority: 20,245 (54.9%)
Shadow portfolios
Shadow Secretary of State
2018–2020	International Development
Shadow Minister
2020	Financial Secretary
2018	International Development

Personal details
- Born: Daniel Joseph Carden; 28 October 1986 (age 39) Liverpool, Merseyside, England
- Party: Labour
- Other political affiliations: Socialist Campaign Group (2017–2024); Blue Labour (2024–present)
- Education: London School of Economics (BSc)
- Website: dancarden.co.uk

Daniel Joseph Carden (born 28 October 1986) is a British politician who has served as Member of Parliament (MP) for Liverpool Walton since 2017. A member of the Labour Party, Carden identifies as a socialist and as belonging to the party's conservative left. He was a member of the Socialist Campaign Group caucus of left-wing Labour MPs until 2024, before founding the economically left-wing and socially conservative Blue Labour parliamentary caucus in 2025.

Carden served as Shadow Secretary of State for International Development from 2018 to 2020, and Shadow Financial Secretary to the Treasury from April to October 2020. He resigned from the latter role due to the disagreements with the party leadership over the Covert Human Intelligence Sources (Criminal Conduct) Bill.

Carden is a patron of LGBT+ Labour, one of eight LGBT MPs newly elected in the 2017 general election. An avowed socialist, he paid tribute to his predecessor Eric Heffer in a memorial lecture in January 2019.

== Early life and career ==
Daniel Carden was born on 28 October 1986 in Liverpool. His mother worked in the NHS for over 40 years. His father, Mike Carden, was a shop steward during the Liverpool dockers' dispute during the 1990s, and was left unemployed for seven years after being sacked for refusing to cross a picket line. In his maiden speech, Carden recalled: "From the age of eight, I stood on picket lines, and I'm as proud to stand alongside workers in struggle today as an MP as I was then as a kid."

His secondary education was at St Edward's College in West Derby, Liverpool, where he was the Head Boy. He went on to study International Relations at the London School of Economics, graduating with a BSc, where he was also chair of the university Labour Club.

Prior to becoming an MP, Carden worked at Unite the Union in the office of its General Secretary, Len McCluskey.

== Parliamentary career ==
=== First term (2017–2019) ===
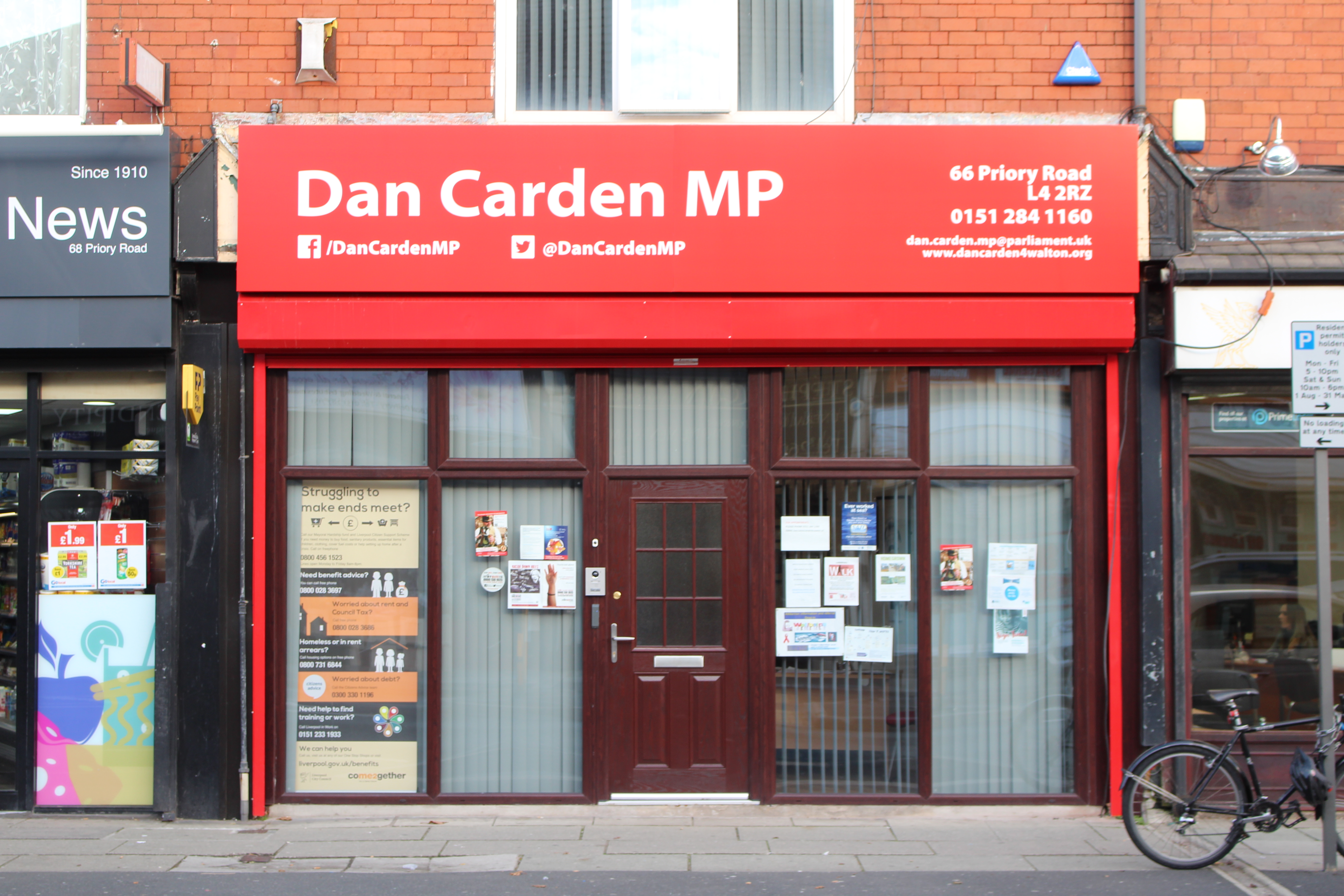
Carden's constituency office in Anfield in 2018

In June 2017, Carden defeated Liverpool City Mayor Joe Anderson, Theresa Griffin MEP and others to be selected by the NEC to be selected as the Labour candidate for Liverpool Walton. At the snap 2017 general election, Carden was elected to Parliament as MP for Liverpool Walton with 85.7% of the vote and a majority of 32,551. In Parliament, he joined the Socialist Campaign Group of left-wing Labour MPs.

In October 2017, Carden campaigned for a ban on LGBT conversion therapy after a church in Anfield was exposed by a Liverpool Echo investigation for offering ritual starvation as a 'cure' for homosexuality. In July 2018, the UK Government pledged to bring forward proposals for a legislative ban.

Also in July 2018, Carden used two consecutive Prime Minister's Questions to call for the new Royal Liverpool Hospital to be delivered in the public sector following the collapse of Carillion. On 25 September 2018, it was reported that the government would terminate the private finance initiative deal, taking the hospital into full public ownership.

==== Shadow International Development Secretary ====
On 1 December 2018, Carden was appointed Shadow Secretary of State for International Development after the resignation of Kate Osamor.

In the run-up to the 2019 General Election, Carden said Labour would turn the CDC Group into a green development bank and create a new Public Services Unit for water, healthcare and education. Other policy plans included banning all aid spending on fossil fuels, support for trade unions globally, tripling funding for women's rights groups, introducing an ombudsman for abuse in aid sector and support for small-scale farmers with a Food Sovereignty Fund.

Carden called for the UK to use its influence to democratise the IMF and World Bank, challenging the agenda of liberalising markets, cutting social spending and privatising public services "so the poorest countries can decide their own destiny." Alongside Shadow Chancellor John McDonnell, he proposed an Overseas Loan Transparency Act to establish a new compulsory register to put an end to exploitative secret loans to foreign governments. At the time of the COVID-19 pandemic, Carden called for the debts of countries in the Global South to be cancelled so that resources could go towards healthcare not debt repayments.

At the 2019 general election, Carden was re-elected as MP for Liverpool Walton with a decreased vote share of 84.7% and a decreased majority of 30,520.

=== Second term (2019–2024) ===
==== Shadow Financial Secretary to the Treasury ====
On 9 April 2020, Carden became Shadow Financial Secretary to the Treasury following a reshuffle by new party leader Keir Starmer. In October, he accused the Conservative government of corruption in its handling of the COVID-19 pandemic, highlighting public contracts handed to Tory-linked firms without competition or transparency.

==== Return to the backbenches ====
On 15 October 2020, Carden resigned from Labour's front bench in order to vote against the Covert Human Intelligence Sources (Criminal Conduct) Bill, defying the party's instruction to abstain. In his resignation letter, he wrote: "As a Liverpool MP and trade unionist, I share the deep concerns about this legislation from across the labour movement, human rights organisations, and so many who have suffered the abuse of state power, from blacklisted workers to the Hillsborough families and survivors."

Carden has become involved with the Inter-Parliamentary Union. In March 2022, Carden delivered an address to the global assembly of parliamentarians in Indonesia. Referencing his Irish heritage, he called on countries to accept more refugees and to reject "anti-migrant, racist rhetoric". In November 2022, Carden became Treasurer of the British Group of the Inter-Parliamentary Union. On 12 March 2023, at the Inter-Parliamentary Union's 146th Assembly in Manama, Bahrain, Carden was elected President of the Board of the Forum of Young Parliamentarians.

In September 2023, Carden was appointed Parliamentary Private Secretary to the Shadow Chancellor of the Exchequer, Rachel Reeves, after Samantha Dixon left the position to become a whip. However, on 15 November 2023, Dan Carden was among 10 frontbench Labour MPs to resign their roles in order to vote in favour of a motion tabled by the SNP calling for an immediate ceasefire in Gaza, joining a group of 56 Labour MPs in defying the party's instruction to abstain.

On 13 December 2023, Carden was appointed Prime Minister's Trade Envoy to Mexico.

=== Third term (2024–present) ===
At the 2024 general election, Carden was again re-elected with a decreased vote share of 70.6% and a decreased majority of 20,245.

==== Association with Blue Labour ====
In an interview with the New Statesman from July 2024, Carden revealed that he had left the Socialist Campaign Group of left-wing Labour MPs earlier in the year. When asked why he had left the group, he said there was "no particular political reason", but added that he was now more open to the communitarian political ideas of Blue Labour, an economically left-wing and socially conservative tradition in the Labour Party. Carden also revealed that he was in regular contact with Blue Labour founder Maurice Glasman.

In January 2025, along with conservatives, Carden asked for a new national inquiry into the Rotherham child sexual exploitation scandal, after party leader and prime minister Keir Starmer ruled one out, instead preferring to implement the recommendations formulated by previous investigations. Carden specifically took issue with allegations that the police did not look into rape cases equally because of concerns over racial discrimination; the Rotherham child sexual exploitation scandal is believed to have primarily involved men of Pakistani descent in Rotherham. Speaking to the Liverpool Echo, Carden said it was "shocking that people in positions of power could have covered up and refused to act [on investigating rape cases] to avoid confronting racial or cultural issues or because victims were poor and working class […] We must question and challenge the orthodoxy of progressive liberal multiculturalism that led to authorities failing to act." His declarations were praised by Glasman and Blue Labour, which also called on a national inquiry into the scandal, and also by figures on the right such as Elon Musk.

Later that month, Carden was interviewed by Jason Cowley of The Daily Telegraph, in which he accused the ideology of liberalism of failing the victims of the scandal. He also revealed that he now identified himself as belonging to the "conservative left" represented by Blue Labour, explaining his political transformation as moving "not from the left to the right but from the left to the left". He said that he had observed the Labour Party move away from its traditional working class base towards a liberal and progressive metropolitan elite, with "a split between liberal, progressive politics and the condition of the working class, their communities and ability to have a voice in politics", which in turn empowered the hard-right and Reform UK. In an interview with PoliticsHome, he criticised progressivism for threatening communities and "challeng[ing] the value of long-standing institutions, from trade unions to churches", which he said was "incredibly damaging". According to Carden, the main objective of the left and the Labour Party is to now "look at where the working class has moved. We have to win back our core support or else we will just become a party of middle-class metropolitan graduates."

To address these concerns, Carden established a Blue Labour parliamentary caucus of backbench Labour MPs in January 2025 with the support of Glasman, who believes the group can transform a culture of progressive orthodoxy among Labour MPs. The group is chaired by Carden and mainly includes MPs from the 2024 parliamentary intake, with key members including MPs Jonathan Hinder, Jonathan Brash and David Smith. Former MP Jon Cruddas is also a supporter of the group. It is opposed to diversity, equity, and inclusion practices.

== Alcohol addiction and recovery ==
In July 2021, Carden revealed during a parliamentary debate that in his early twenties alcohol addiction had nearly killed him amid the pressure of coming to terms with his sexuality. In recovery since 2019, Carden credits his sobriety to the support of his family and friends, as well as the guidance of support groups such as Alcoholics Anonymous.

In 2021, Carden campaigned for measures such as minimum unit pricing and greater regulation of alcohol advertising. Working with Alcohol Health Alliance UK, he called for an Independent Review of Alcohol to inform a new Alcohol Strategy, highlighting that despite record alcohol-specific deaths, the UK has not published a strategy for tackling alcohol harm since 2012.

Carden is an Ambassador for Adfam and Chair of the All-Party Parliamentary Group on Drugs, Alcohol and Justice.

Parliament of the United Kingdom
Preceded by Steve Rotheram	Member of Parliament for Liverpool Walton; 2017–present	Incumbent
