= Blue Labour =

UK political pressure group

- Parliamentary group leader: Dan Carden
- Founder: Maurice Glasman
- Founded: April 2009 (17 years ago)
- Ideology: Social conservatism; Guild socialism; Ethical socialism; Corporatism
- Political position: Social: Right-wing; Economic: Left-wing
- Party: Labour Party
- Colours: Blue
- Parliamentary Labour Party: 8 / 403
- House of Commons: 8 / 650

Website
- bluelabour.org

Blue Labour is a British campaign group and political faction that seeks to promote blue-collar and culturally conservative values within the British Labour Party – particularly on immigration, crime, EDI and community spirit – while remaining committed to labour rights and left-wing economic policies. It seeks to represent what it considers a working-class approach to Labour politics. In Parliament, the faction is led by MP Dan Carden, who founded the Blue Labour parliamentary caucus of Labour MPs in 2025 along with Jonathan Brash, Jonathan Hinder, and David Smith. Its members include Connor Naismith, Margaret Mullane and Shabana Mahmood, who has served as Home Secretary since September 2025.

Launched in 2009 as a counter to New Labour, the Blue Labour movement first rose to prominence after Labour's defeat in the 2010 general election, in which for the first time the party received fewer working-class votes than it did middle-class votes. The movement has influenced a handful of Labour MPs and frontbenchers; founder Maurice Glasman served as a close ally to Ed Miliband during his early years as Leader of the Opposition, before himself becoming a life peer in the House of Lords. The movement has also seen a resurgence of interest after the loss of red wall seats in the 2019 general election.

Blue Labour argues that the party lost touch with its base by embracing anti-patriotism in the face of Brexit and by undermining solidarity in local communities through bureaucratic collectivism, social agendas, and neoliberal economics. It argues that whilst postwar Old Labour had become too uncritical of state power, New Labour far worsened this with an uncritical view of global markets as well. The group further advocates a switch to local and democratic community management and provision of services, rather than relying on a top-down welfare state which it sees as excessively bureaucratic. Economically it is described as a "movement keen on guild socialism and continental corporatism".

The Blue Labour position has been articulated in books such as Tangled Up in Blue (2011) by Rowenna Davis, Blue Labour: Forging a New Politics (2015) by Ian Geary and Adrian Pabst and Blue Labour: The Politics of the Common Good (2022) by Glasman himself. Additional elucidations on Blue Labour's ideas can be found in The Purple Book (2011) by Robert Philpot and Despised: Why the Modern Left Loathes the Working Class (2020) by Paul Embery. A number of commentators, including Adrian Pabst himself, have argued that, as leader of the Labour Party, Keir Starmer adopted significant elements of Blue Labour's analysis and policies.

== History ==
=== Launch of the group ===
The London Metropolitan University academic Maurice Glasman launched Blue Labour in April 2009 at a meeting in Conway Hall, Bloomsbury, where he defined it as "a deeply conservative socialism that places family, faith and work at the heart of a new politics of reciprocity, mutuality and solidarity". He called for an alternative to the post-1945 centralising approach of the Labour Party. The movement grew through a series of seminars held in University College, Oxford, and at London Metropolitan University in the aftermath of Labour's defeat in the 2010 general election.

Political analyst Bob Jessop described the movement as follows:

Blue Labour is an attempt to say, we are the Labour Party after all, and we should represent the working class rather than be the party of the aspirant middle classes. But this current does not take an idealized vision of the working class but refers to the actually existing working class – regarding it as socially conservative and nationalistic in the potential Labour heartlands – at the same time as arguing against neoliberalism and for corporatist arrangements and local democratic socialism.

It rejects the New Labour electoral strategy, which starts from the observation that the industrial working class increasingly does not vote so that it is necessary to chase swing voters by appealing to home-owning middle class and workers who aspire to homeownership. Blue Labour aims to regain lost Labour voters who have supported UKIP or support Conservative social policies or, increasingly, do not vote at all, but also suffer from neoliberal policies and the politics of austerity.

It has been suggested that the name Blue Labour arose in reaction to a comparable communitarian trend in the Conservative Party called Red Tory, and also to suggest a hint of sadness, nostalgia and loss. The philosophical basis of Blue Labour is a combination of Aristotelianism (especially the concept of virtue) with the critique of market society developed by the Hungarian economist Karl Polanyi.

=== 2010s ===
Glasman was once described as former Labour leader Ed Miliband's "guru" by political commentator Matthew D'Ancona, who suggested that while the party may not adopt the full programme of Blue Labour (particularly its criticisms of consumerism and globalisation), the trend was helping "the Labour leader forge a language in which to express his championship of the NHS". Between 2010 and 2015, some commentators suggested that Blue Labour could be a potential alternative to David Cameron's Big Society, the "big idea" that might even "define Miliband's leadership".

The Conservative government of Boris Johnson changed policies toward Levelling Up the regions and raising working-class wages and skills partly by limiting migrant labour through Brexit, along with some more communitarian themes, and away from the small-state libertarian Singapore-on-Thames Brexit vision. Blue Labour reported an increase in followers after Johnson's 2019 general election victory.

=== 2020s ===
Labour leader Keir Starmer was also described as being influenced by Blue Labour and was praised as "a true conservative" by Glasman in an article on UnHerd. However, Glasman later became more critical of Starmer's leadership, warning him about the potential of Reform UK to take votes away from the Labour Party.

In June 2024, Maurice Glasman, Jon Cruddas and Jonathan Rutherford launched a "Future of the Left" project at the conservative think tank Policy Exchange.

Speaking at the Postliberalism Conference in December 2024, Maurice Glasman celebrated the victory of Donald Trump, which he said was "world historical" and "a multi-racial, multi-ethnic, interfaith, working-class coalition against progressives". He declared that "the only place to build a house now is on the left side of MAGA square", which he understands as the faction represented by Steve Bannon. Morgan Jones and David Klemperer, co-editors of Renewal, said that by choosing to align with the MAGA movement, Glasman had sided with forces which threaten social democracy, and which today represent its primary antagonist. They said that Glasman's current positions "should give us pause before treating him as constructive interlocutor within the Labour Party".

==== Parliamentary caucus ====
In January 2025, Dan Carden, Labour MP for Liverpool Walton, formed a caucus within the Parliamentary Labour Party alongside three 2024 intake MPs, Jonathan Brash, Jonathan Hinder, and David Smith. Morgan McSweeney, Keir Starmer's chief of staff, was said to be paying attention to their work. LabourList reported that the group's MPs had grown "into double digits" by February. Brash said the group was talking to other parliamentary groups that were 'broadly aligned' with them. In May, Justice Secretary Shabana Mahmood said she was a member of Blue Labour.

On 2 June 2025, The Guardian reported that the Blue Labour caucus was influencing government policy relating to the electoral challenge of Reform UK, and recommended that the government legislate against equality, diversity, and inclusion (EDI) policies in employment, sentencing decisions and other aspects in the public sector. In the September 2025 cabinet reshuffle, Mahmood was appointed Home Secretary. This was seen as signalling a shift towards a more hard-line immigration policy by the government of Keir Starmer. Maurice Glasman welcomed her appointment as "fantastic" and said she was "now clearly the leader" of Blue Labour.

== Parliamentary membership ==
In Parliament, Blue Labour is understood to have a membership going "into double digits" as of February 2025, although many have chosen to stay anonymous. Publicly identified MPs who are members of Blue Labour include:

- Dan Carden, MP for Liverpool Walton (since 2017)
- Jonathan Brash, MP for Hartlepool (since 2024)
- Jonathan Hinder, MP for Pendle and Clitheroe (since 2024)
- David Smith, MP for North Northumberland (since 2024)
- Connor Naismith, MP for Crewe and Nantwich (since 2024)
- Shabana Mahmood, MP for Birmingham Ladywood (since 2010), Home Secretary (since 2025)
- Margaret Mullane, MP for Dagenham and Rainham (since 2024)
- Preet Kaur Gill, MP for Birmingham Edgbaston (since 2017)

== Key issues ==
=== Overview ===
Marcel Stoetzle describes Blue Labour as "a form of 'lower case', socially-minded conservatism". Blue Labour rejects progressivism, arguing that the strategy pursued by Labour to win over the progressive middle classes made the party technocratic and isolated them from the alienated and cultural working class. Blue Labour seeks to reorient the party towards ethical socialism, and reject the legacy of New Labour. Blue Labour rejects statist and materialist conceptions of socialism, and instead promotes a conservative concept of 'the Good Society' rooted in localism and communitarianism; its approach to social and cultural issues has been described as "faith, family and flag". James Avis describes the philosophy of Blue Labour as follows:

Radical conservatism [blue Labour] shares this sense of loss, of a degradation of human labour under the conditions of a profitmaximizing capitalism. It supports the aspiration for an economy that can better respect work-related identities and sources of personal meaning… By contrast, an economy which seeks to maximize profit will produce a gravely imbalanced society where the plurality of proper social goals and values get subordinated to the creation of an investible surplus.

PoliticsHome described Blue Labour as both "pro-worker" and "anti-woke". Dan Carden, who founded the Blue Labour caucus in 2025, denounces progressive politics as "incredibly damaging", arguing that it threatens communities and erodes social institutions such as trade unions and churches. Jonathan Hinder summarised the political agenda of Blue Labour as "bold, left-wing economic policies, much lower immigration, a complete rejection of divisive identity politics, and proudly reclaiming our patriotism."

Blue Labour strongly supports protectionism and reindustrialisation, and the MPs of the caucus praised Donald Trump for protecting American industries and ensuring 'secure borders'. The founder of Blue Labour, Maurice Glasman, praised Trump and Reform UK for their social policies and resonating with the working-class electorate, but criticised their economic policies, stating that "all of this is worthless unless you're actually pro-worker and pro-trade union." Blue Labour MPs identify as socially right-of-centre, and Carden stated that he does not mind being called socially conservative.

One of the core premises of Blue Labour is that under the governments of Blair and Brown, Labour lost touch with its traditional supporters – socially conservative low-income voters, working class, and those living in small towns and postindustrial cities; Blue Labour charges the Labour Party with becoming "the party of globalisation and metropolitan liberalism, pushing for an ever-more centralised state, free markets and mass immigration". A leading Blue Labour thinker, Jonathan Rutherford, argued that social-democratic parties declined because of their priority for "abstract values" and universalist principles of equality and rights.

Blue Labour argues that socialist parties should instead embrace "particular communal bonds of mutual reciprocity, local identity, and national, familial and religious ties" that characterise working class communities. Believing that the state should 'grow out of the experience of everyday ordinary life' rather than being based on 'abstract values that exist prior to people's everyday experience and which it superimposes on their lives', Blue Labour rejects liberal capitalism, centralised state, free movement of labour and the European Union - it instead favours a corporatist model of labour relations, where work does not only provide a means to make a living, but also becomes "the primary bearer of the cultural and ethical traditions of the national community, to which political realm should be subservient".

=== Brexit and immigration ===
Blue Labour sees the EU as a centralising force which limits the capacity for democratic decision-making about life in the UK. In particular, the idea of a 'single market' has been stretched too far as what began as a desire to facilitate trade across national boundaries has, in the name of competition policy, become a resistance to governments setting their own policies on areas like housing and financial services. Blue Labour supports Lexit, with one of the main thinkers of Blue Labour, Jonathan Rutherford, writing that Brexit "creates the opportunity for a national renewal against the forces of global capital". The representatives of Blue Labour argue that Brexit allows to reinstate the economic sovereignty of nation-state against the global capitalist institutions.

In July 2011, Glasman suggested that free movement of labour from the European Union should be renegotiated, causing a rift within the party. At a fringe meeting of the 2011 Labour Party Conference, Glasman reaffirmed some of these statements on immigration, argued for half of Britain's universities to be converted to vocational colleges and criticised the power of public-sector trade unions.

In 2025, after Prime Minister Keir Starmer said that Reform UK's plan to make migrants with the secure indefinite leave to remain status reapply for visas was "racist", leading Blue Labour members Glasman and Brash said they would not have used this language.

=== New Labour ===
Glasman criticised the New Labour administration of Tony Blair for having an uncritical view of the market economy and that of Gordon Brown for being uncritical of both the market and the state. Chuka Umunna, the former Labour Shadow Business Secretary, who later left the Party, said in 2011 that Blue Labour "provides the seeds of national renewal".

Blue Labour argues that abstract concepts have held back the Labour Party from linking with the concerns of many voters, with its concern over material equality leading to an "obsession with the postcode lottery". As an alternative to those ideas, Blue Labour emphasises the importance of democratic engagement with more left-wing economic policy combined with insisting that the Labour Party should seek to reinvigorate its relationships with communities across the nation, with an approach based on what Glasman describes as "family, faith, and flag".

=== Welfare ===
Frank Field has been cited as an inspiration for Blue Labour.

In October 2013, Glasman delivered a speech to a Social Democratic Party of Germany event in Berlin. Praising the role of Ernest Bevin in developing the German economic model after the Second World War, he described the SPD as Labour's most important sister party outside the Commonwealth. He contrasted the British post-war consensus negatively with the German model, saying the latter was closer to the pre-war Labour ethos of solidarity than the collectivism of Attlee, which he described as a continuation of wartime planning. Glasman concluded that pre-war Labour "improved the conditions of the working class precisely because it was not simply left-wing, it was also patriotic, conservative in relation to the constitution of Parliament and the monarchy, very strong in support of family life and contribution with a strong sense of place".

== Key publications ==
The Labour Tradition and the Politics of Paradox: The Oxford London Seminars, 2010–2011 is a collection of articles by Glasman, Stears and Jonathan Rutherford along with commentaries by many leading Labour figures including David Miliband, David Lammy, Hazel Blears, Jon Cruddas and James Purnell which looks at the way an attachment to neoliberalism and globalisation cut Labour off from some of its community traditions and ignored the importance of human relations.

The book has a supportive preface by former Labour Leader Ed Miliband, who states:

Even in the aftermath of a profound economic crisis, politicians of all parties need to realise that the quality of families' lives and the strength of the communities in which we live depends as much on placing limits to markets as much as restoring their efficiency. And for social democrats in particular, the discussion points to the need to ask how it can support a stronger civic culture below the level of Whitehall and Westminster.

The Purple Book: A Progressive Future For Labour, published in 2011, combines the views of several members of the Labour Party and is considered to be strongly supportive of several of the ideas promoted by Blue Labour. It was edited by Robert Philpot and was explicitly endorsed by Glasman, Ed Miliband and David Miliband. The book was designed to bring together policy proposals for Labour but to delve into its revisionists roots before Old Labour looking at ideas stemming from the Christian Socialist Movement and R. H. Tawney, calling for an effective and active government not a big state. It also shares some themes from Tony Crosland's book on The Future of Socialism.

The book Tangled Up in Blue by Rowenna Davis explores the extent of Blue Labour's influence within the Labour Party and how Glasman's ideas influenced the leadership campaigns of both Ed Miliband and his brother David Miliband. It talks of how Glasman was initially working for David Miliband's campaign and put forward ideas on much more community devolution and the Movement for Change. It alleges that the living wage campaign masterminded by Ed Miliband's supporters was as a result of Glasman's involvement in Ed Miliband's leadership campaign at the same time. It also suggests Glasman used ties with Stewart Wood and Patrick Diamond to put forward Blue Labour ideas in Labour's 2010 manifesto such as community land trusts and a living wage as well as writing Gordon Brown's speech. The book further reveals alleged links between Glasman and Phillip Blond and similarities between their politics as well as how Glasman and Blond were co-operating together to promote their "radical conservatism" with both Labour and Conservative parties.

Blue Labour: Forging a New Politics, edited by Ian Geary and Adrian Pabst, was published in 2015. The book is another collection of essays on topics ranging from political philosophy to an analysis of European models of capitalism and to immigration in Britain from a theoretical position that is for the most part indebted to Catholic social teaching. Contributors include David Lammy, John Milbank and David Goodhart.

In 2022, Maurice Glasman himself illustrated his political positions in the book Blue Labour: The Politics of the Common Good.

== Bibliography ==
- Maurice Glasman, Jonathan Rutherford, Marc Stears and Stuart White, The Labour tradition and the politics of paradox, Lawrence & Wishart, 2011;
- Robert Philpot, The Purple Book: A Progressive Future For Labour, Biteback Publishing, 2011;
- Rowenna Davis, Tangled Up in Blue, Ruskin Publishing, 2011;
- Ian Geary and Adrian Pabst, Blue Labour: Forging a New Politics, I.B. Tauris, 2015;
- Maurice Glasman, Blue Labour: The Politics of the Common Good, Polity, 2022.

== See also ==
- Left-conservatism
- Christian democracy
- Conservative Co-operative Movement
- Mondeo Man
- Progress (organisation)
- Progressive realism
- The Purple Book (Labour Party)
- Reagan Democrat
- Blue Dog Democrats
