= Tangled Up in Blue (book) =

2011 politics book by Rowenna Davis

Tangled Up in Blue: Blue Labour and the Struggle for Labour's Soul
- The book's front cover designed by Sade Payne
- Author: Rowenna Davis
- Language: English
- Subject: British politics
- Publisher: Ruskin Publishing
- Publication date: October 2011
- Publication place: United Kingdom
- Media type: Print (paperback)
- ISBN: 978-1-78072-068-5

Tangled Up in Blue: Blue Labour and the Struggle for Labour's Soul is a 2011 politics book by the journalist and Labour councillor Rowenna Davis. The work tracks the emergence of Blue Labour, a movement within the UK Labour Party which seeks to promote active citizenship and to champion traditional community values. While Davis does describe Blue Labour's ideas and policy recommendations, the book focuses on political relationships and the roles these played in Blue Labour's development. In particular the book is concerned with Lord Glasman and his relationships with other academics, strategists, and politicians – especially David and Ed Miliband. The work is Davis's first book.

== Synopsis ==
The book has a foreword by Steve Richards, an introduction, five chapters, and a conclusion.

=== Foreword ===
In the foreword, Richards describes how his first meeting with Glasman shattered his initial assessment that Blue Labour was derivative and backward looking, and claims that the importance of Blue Labour was partly shaped by Ed Miliband's rise to party leader, after which he declared that the era of New Labour was over.

According to Richards, Blue Labour is the most important source of fresh ideas to fill the resulting void, and that Glasman has the potential to be just the sort of compelling advocate needed to present new thinking if it is to gain acceptance by the political mainstream.

=== Introduction ===
Davis sets out her aim to reveal the untold story of Blue Labour's genesis and growth as an influential force within the Labour Party. She quotes Ed Miliband talking about how one of the strengths of Blue Labour is its recognition of the importance of personal relationships both for a healthy society and even for a good economy. Davis touches on many of the themes which she expands later in the book:

- the way Glasman was inspired to attempt to invigorate the Labour Party by his dying mother and by contact with the "Red Tory" Phillip Blond.
- the story of Glasman's almost unique role as someone supporting the leadership campaigns of both Miliband brothers.
- an outline of Blue Labour's agenda and intellectual development.

Much of the introduction describes the three pillars of Blue Labour, which are: Pillar one: interests, institutions and ideas; Pillar two: reciprocity, relationships and responsibility; Pillar three: virtue, vocation and value.

=== Chapter One: A Pledge to a Mother ===
In the opening chapter, Davis discusses the factors that led Glasman to launch the Blue Labour initiative.

The first was his mother, a lifelong Labour supporter who very much saw the Labour Party as the champion of ordinary people's interests. Glasman was incensed that on the night she died in January 2009, Labour's bailout of the banks was still playing out on the news and saw the bailout as a huge unnecessary transfer of wealth from the poor to the rich. It was on that night, in conversation with his wife, that Glasman first came up with the label "Blue Labour".

Another key influence in the development of Blue Labour was Phillip Blond, the so-called "red Tory". When Blond first met Glasman it was the Tory who was much better known within Westminster. The two became friends and Blond was pleased to help raise Glasman's profile as the two had partially overlapping ideas.

The success of Obama's 2008 election campaign had also helped to inspire Glasman, as it involved the sort of relationship-orientated, decentralised community mobilisation that he wished to promote.

A fifth influence was Glasman's prior involvement with Citizens UK, an umbrella group dedicated to community organising.

=== Chapter Two: A Speech to Remember ===
The second chapter discusses how Glasman came to form relationships with the senior leadership in the Labour Party.

Ed Miliband had found out about Glasman during his investigation of Citizens UK, which he had become interested in due to the group's efforts to address poverty with its living wage campaign and other initiatives, they met in the autumn of 2009 and quickly became friends.

Shortly after, Glasman also formed strong relationships with senior figures in David Miliband's camp, thanks to introductions by his friend, the journalist Allegra Stratton.

Just three nights before the 2010 general election, Glasman wrote a speech for Gordon Brown, who had decided to address Citizens UK. The speech was very well received, often considered his best of the campaign.

=== Chapter Three: Loyalty Amongst Brothers ===
This chapter records Glasman's role as advisor to both the Miliband brothers during their 2010 campaign to be elected as the new leader of Labour.

According to Davis, Glasman was almost unique among prominent Labour Party members in helping the campaigns of both Ed and David but committing to neither.

David Miliband entered into an informal alliance with Citizens UK – several members from the organisation helped his campaign. Glasman assisted Citizens UK to liaise with David's senior team. Despite this, Glasman also advised Ed Miliband.

According to Davis, Glassman had a strong personal relationship only with Ed and not with his brother, though he did have close friendships with senior members of David's team.

The book reveals that Glasman expected Ed to win as he thought the younger brother had a more appealing energy, but does not reveal which brother Glasman personally voted for.

=== Chapter Four: An Unexpected Guest ===
The fourth chapter focuses on an important stage of Blue Labour's intellectual development which took place at seminars held at Oxford University between October 2010 and April 2011.

Davis relates that the five key people leading the seminars were Glasman himself and four other academics who are all to various degrees also active as political strategists. These four are Jonathan Rutherford, Marc Stears, Stuart White, and Lord Wood of Anfield.

Some two dozen senior Labour players attended the meetings. These included both Miliband brothers and the MP Jon Cruddas. It was at these seminars that the document often regarded as Blue Labour's manifesto was drafted: The Labour Tradition and the Politics of Paradox.

Davis discusses Glasman's personal contribution to the document: a paper where he traces the Labour tradition back to the participatory democracy of the ancient Greeks, going on to discuss how Labour was founded in the 19th century not by an intellectual elite but from grass roots community activism, in particular that which arose from the London Dock Strike of 1889.

=== Chapter Five: A Test of Friendship ===
Chapter Five notes Glasman's elevation to the House of Lords on the recommendation of Ed Miliband, the consequent considerable media attention, which attracted the interest of several new party members, who would frequently meet at Westminster's Portcullis House and the controversy he subsequently generated which came close to ending Blue Labour as a political force.

Blue Labour's high-profile also attracted hostile attention; several feminist Labour Party MPs fiercely attacked the movement as they saw Blue Labour as anti-woman, even greater controversy was created by Glasman's repeated comments on the need to tighten up immigration, and his assertion that Labour ought to reach out to the EDL, a far right group who describe themselves as opponents of radical Islamism but who are described by critics as racist.

The controversy peaked in July 2011, with several leading figures including Jon Cruddas and Jonathan Rutherford publicly dissociating themselves from Blue Labour and several media commentators announced that Blue Labour had effectively ended.

Davis relates how Glasman concedes he was politically naïve in making the comments about immigration. He thought he would never be cast as racist or sexist due to his life's work in helping immigrants, especially female immigrants, speak out, and in representing their interests through community organising.

=== Conclusion ===
In the conclusion, Davis reviewed the prospects for Blue Labour's continued influence on the mainstream Labour Party. She concluded that Blue Labour probably does have a future, at least as a source of ideas if not as a brand.

After the movement was pronounced dead by various journalists in summer 2011, Glasman withdrew from the public eye, but remained committed to promoting Blue Labour, and continued to expand his network of interested contacts. There has been growing interest among Labour academics and strategists centred on London and Oxford. Davis says support for Blue Labour remains weak among the parliamentary party, naming only a handful of then MPs who openly support Blue Labour, such as Hazel Blears, Tessa Jowell, and Caroline Flint.

The author also stated that despite its aim to champion working class traditional values, Blue Labour has next to no grassroots support from regular people outside of Citizens UK. However, both Miliband brothers remain interested in Blue Labour and there are signs that the party leader is increasingly accepting and implementing its ideas. Ed Miliband told the author in a September 2011 interview that Blue Labour is an idea that is "ahead of its time".

== Reception ==
The book attracted a positive reception, with recommendations from journalists such as Kevin Maguire from The Mirror, The Observer's Andrew Rawnsley, The Sunday Telegraph's Matthew d'Ancona, and Patrick Wintour, the political editor of The Guardian.

Abigail O'Reilly for The Independent described the book as an "excellent, clearly written" guide to Blue Labour.

A review by Tom Cutterham of The Oxonian, focused on how in his opinion the book informed the reader about Ed Miliband's retreat from the more radically socialist outlook he had before winning the leadership contest.

Carl Packman of Left Foot Forward called the book "fantastic", saying it's an introduction to Glasman's efforts to rejuvenate a "party with a great, Blair-shaped hole in its body."

Don Paskini of Liberal Conspiracy said the book described Blue Labour's ideas with "far more eloquence and clarity than any Blue Labour advocate" had managed hitherto and that the book created a favourable impression of Glasman as a politician, but that it did not convince him of the merits of Blue Labour's ideas.

Ian Geary for the Christian Socialist Movement described the book as gripping, accurate, and sympathetic, but also noted that it omitted to discuss Glasman's engagement with Christian socialism.

In The New Statesman, George Eaton also praised the book but said he remained sceptical of Blue Labour's anti-statist leanings.

Writing for Labour List in 2025, Morgan Jones found the book to be "dated" and that its "supportive nature" of Blue Labour made it an "odd book".
