= Jon Cruddas =

British politician (born 1962)

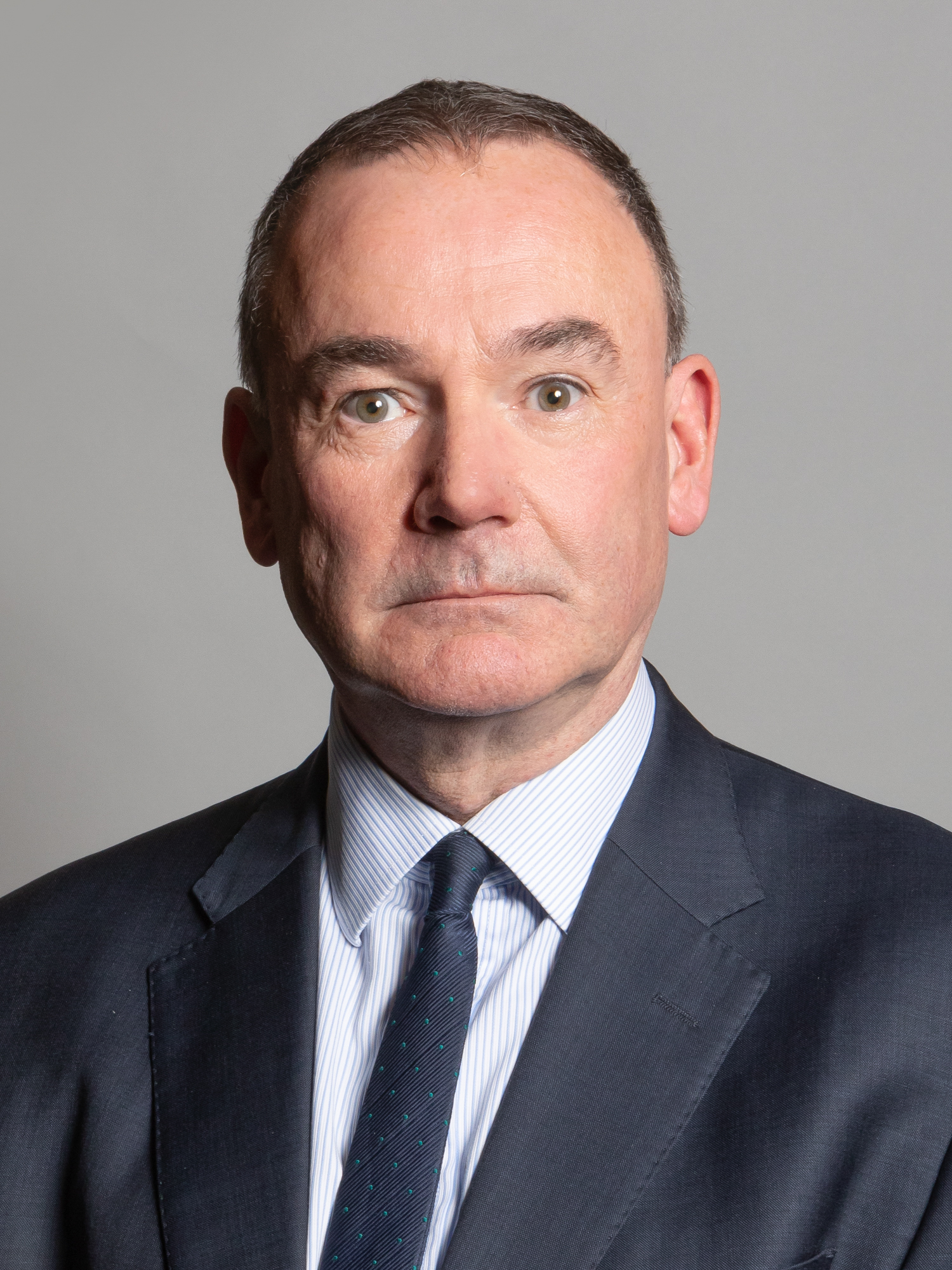
- Official portrait, 2020

Policy Coordinator of the Labour Party
- In office 15 May 2012 – 11 May 2015
- Leader: Ed Miliband
- Preceded by: Liam Byrne

Member of Parliament for Dagenham and Rainham Dagenham (2001–2010)
- In office 7 June 2001 – 30 May 2024
- Preceded by: Judith Church
- Succeeded by: Margaret Mullane

Personal details
- Born: Jonathan Cruddas; 7 April 1962 (age 64) Helston, Cornwall, England
- Party: Labour
- Spouse: Anna Healy (m. 1992)
- Children: 1
- Education: University of Warwick
- Website: www.joncruddas.org.uk

Academic background
- Thesis: An analysis of value theory, the sphere of production and contemporary approaches to the reorganisation of workplace relations (1991)

Jonathan Cruddas (born 7 April 1962) is a British Labour Party politician who served as Member of Parliament (MP) for Dagenham and Rainham, formerly Dagenham, between 2001 and 2024.

A critic of the Blair government, Cruddas unsuccessfully stood for the deputy leadership of the Labour Party in 2007. He has been a leader in Maurice Glasman's Blue Labour project, launched in 2009. In 2012, he was appointed to Ed Miliband's Shadow Cabinet, replacing Liam Byrne as Policy Coordinator.

== Early life and education ==
Cruddas was born in Helston, Cornwall, to John, a sailor in the Royal Navy, and Pat (a native of County Donegal, Ireland). He was educated at the Oaklands Roman Catholic Comprehensive School in Waterlooville near Portsmouth. He then moved to Australia before enrolling at the University of Warwick. He graduated from its Department of Industrial Relations with an MA thesis on Labour market structure in the construction industry: a case study of Milton Keynes in 1985. He was a Visiting Fellow at the University of Wisconsin–Madison from 1987 to 1989. He received a PhD from the University of Warwick's School of Industrial and Business Studies in 1991 for a thesis entitled An analysis of value theory, the sphere of production and contemporary approaches to the reorganisation of workplace relations and supervised by Peter John Nolan.

== Political career ==
=== Early activities ===
In 1989, he became a policy officer for the Labour Party before being appointed Senior Assistant to Labour Party General Secretary Larry Whitty in 1994, remaining in that position when Tom Sawyer became General Secretary that same year. After the 1997 general election, he was employed as Deputy Political Secretary to newly elected Prime Minister Tony Blair. His main role was to be a liaison between the Prime Minister and the trade unions, with whom Blair had often had a difficult relationship. In this role, he also worked heavily on the introduction of the minimum wage.

=== Member of Parliament ===
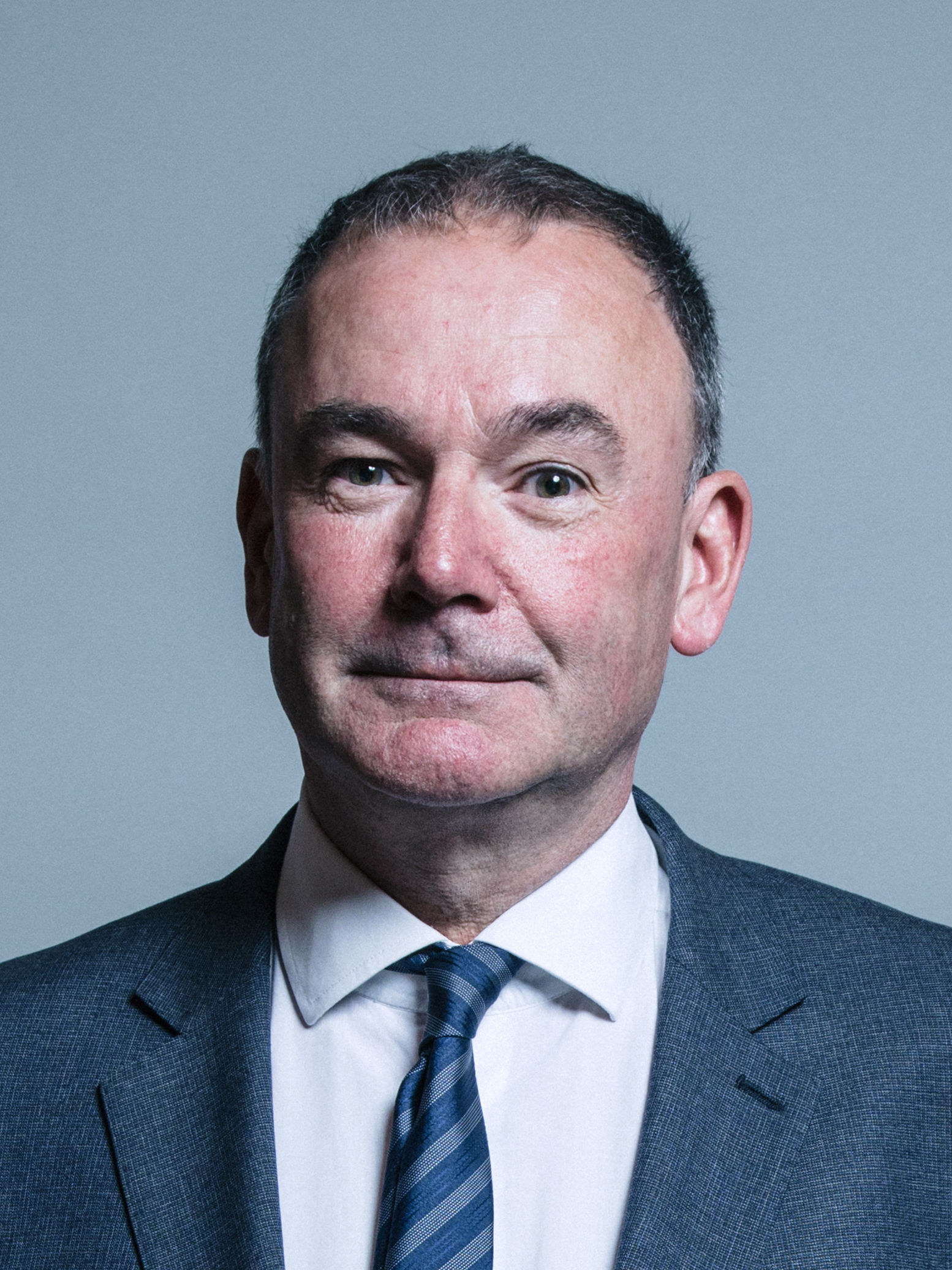
Cruddas in 2017

Cruddas was selected to be the prospective parliamentary candidate for the safe Labour seat of Dagenham in 2000, after the sitting MP Judith Church announced that she would be retiring. He was elected as the MP for Dagenham the following year at the 2001 general election, with a majority of 8,693 votes.

From the backbenches, Cruddas quickly became a vocal critic of the government for what he saw as their ignoring of their traditional, working-class support in a bid to be more appealing to middle-class voters. He rebelled against the government on a number of occasions; including on the introduction of university top-up fees, the legislation on asylum seekers, the introduction of trust schools, proposals to renew the UK Trident nuclear weapons system, and foundation trusts. He supported both the Fourth Option for direct investment in council housing and the Trade Union Freedom Bill.

Cruddas was re-elected at the 2005 general election, but his Dagenham constituency was abolished in boundary changes for the 2010 general election. Cruddas chose to contest the newly created constituency of Dagenham and Rainham, which was notionally marginal. He won the seat by 2,630 votes in a close-run election campaign, which was a seat that the British National Party had heavily targeted. This resulted in a large number of anti-fascist organisations not affiliated to the Labour Party, such as Hope not Hate, campaigning for Cruddas to resist the BNP. After being elected, he took up a part-time position teaching Labour history at University College, Oxford, from 2010 to 2012.

=== Deputy leadership election ===
On 27 September 2006, Cruddas announced his intention to stand to become Deputy Leader of the Labour Party once the incumbent, John Prescott, stood down. He said he did not want to be Deputy Prime Minister, but instead wished to act as a "transmission belt" with the grassroots of the party. In interviews, Cruddas also said that he did not want the "trappings or baubles" that would potentially come with the job of Deputy Prime Minister, such as use of the Dorneywood weekend country residence.

Cruddas accrued nominations from 49 MPs and received strong union backing, including Amicus and the Transport and General Workers' Union. He received backing from former Deputy Leader Roy Hattersley, then Mayor of London Ken Livingstone, NUS President Gemma Tumelty, and former National Executive Committee member, actor and presenter Tony Robinson. The left-wing magazine Tribune endorsed him as "the change that is required".

On 24 June 2007, it was announced that Harriet Harman had won the election, although Cruddas gained the highest proportion of votes in the first round. He was ultimately eliminated in the fourth round of voting, coming third behind Harman and Alan Johnson. He had secured the highest number of votes from members of affiliated organisation in every round before his elimination.

=== Blue Labour ===
In 2007, Cruddas featured in the Immigrants: The Inconvenient Truth episode of the Channel 4 documentary programme Dispatches, which was based on the conclusions of the Institute for Public Policy Research (IPPR).

Associated with bottom-up renewal initiatives for the Labour Party, Cruddas became a central figure and a leading thinker in Maurice Glasman's Blue Labour project, launched in 2009.

=== Policy Review Coordinator ===
Touted by some media sources as a potential candidate for the leadership of the Labour Party, he ruled himself out of the 2010 leadership election and said he did not want the job; but instead wanted to influence policy. In 2012, he was appointed to Ed Miliband's Shadow Cabinet, replacing Liam Byrne as Labour Party Policy Coordinator.

On 15 May 2012, Labour Leader Ed Miliband offered Cruddas a position in his Shadow Cabinet as Labour's Policy Coordinator, with a view to crafting Labour's manifesto for the 2015 general election. Cruddas accepted the offer, saying that it had always been his wish to influence policy. He continued to work with Maurice Glasman in this role and was described in 2013 as "one of the most influential people in the Labour Party". He was accused of failing to disclose sponsorship by the IPPR during this period.

=== Labour Together and opposition to Jeremy Corbyn ===
Jon Cruddas was one of 36 Labour MPs to nominate Jeremy Corbyn as a candidate in the Labour leadership election of 2015. In October 2015, he launched the Labour Together group, which went on to conduct a black propaganda campaign against Corbyn's leadership of the party. Together with Maurice Glasman, Cruddas persuaded Trevor Chinn and Martin Taylor to provide the initial £75,000 of funding for Labour Together before 2017. In the 2016 Labour leadership election, he supported Owen Smith in the failed attempt to replace Corbyn.

In April 2017, Cruddas was among more than 75 MPs who re-launched the centre-left Tribune Group. Although the participants denied that the initiative posed a challenge to Jeremy Corbyn's leadership, it was interpreted as offering resistance to radical left leadership of the party in the long term. He subsequently became a member of Tribune's steering group.

=== The Future of Work Commission ===
The Future of Work Commission was announced at the 2016 Labour Party Annual Conference in Liverpool. The goal of the commission is to make a set of achievable policy recommendations, which will be delivered in a report in September 2017 at Labour Annual Conference in Brighton. Cruddas was one of the Commissioners working on the project.

=== Later parliamentary career and retirement ===
Cruddas narrowly retained his seat at the 2019 general election, with a hugely reduced majority, winning by 293 votes over the Conservative candidate. He supported Lisa Nandy for Labour Leader in the 2020 Labour Party leadership election.

In August 2022 Cruddas announced his intention to retire from Parliament at the 2024 General Election. He expressed optimism about Labour's chances of winning the election. He left the Commons on 30 May 2024.

In September 2025, Cruddas joined Mainstream, a new soft left pressure group within the Labour Party organised around Andy Burnham.

== Academic positions and work ==
Cruddas received a visiting fellowship at Nuffield College, Oxford in 2016 and was made an honorary fellow of the college in July 2024. He was also a visiting professor at the University of Leicester, primarily involved with the Centre for Sustainable Work and Employment Futures, from 2016. In 2021, he became an honorary professor at the Jubilee Centre for Character and Virtues at the University of Birmingham. He wrote a history of the Labour Party to celebrate the 100-year centenary of the first Labour Government in January 2024.

== Political views ==
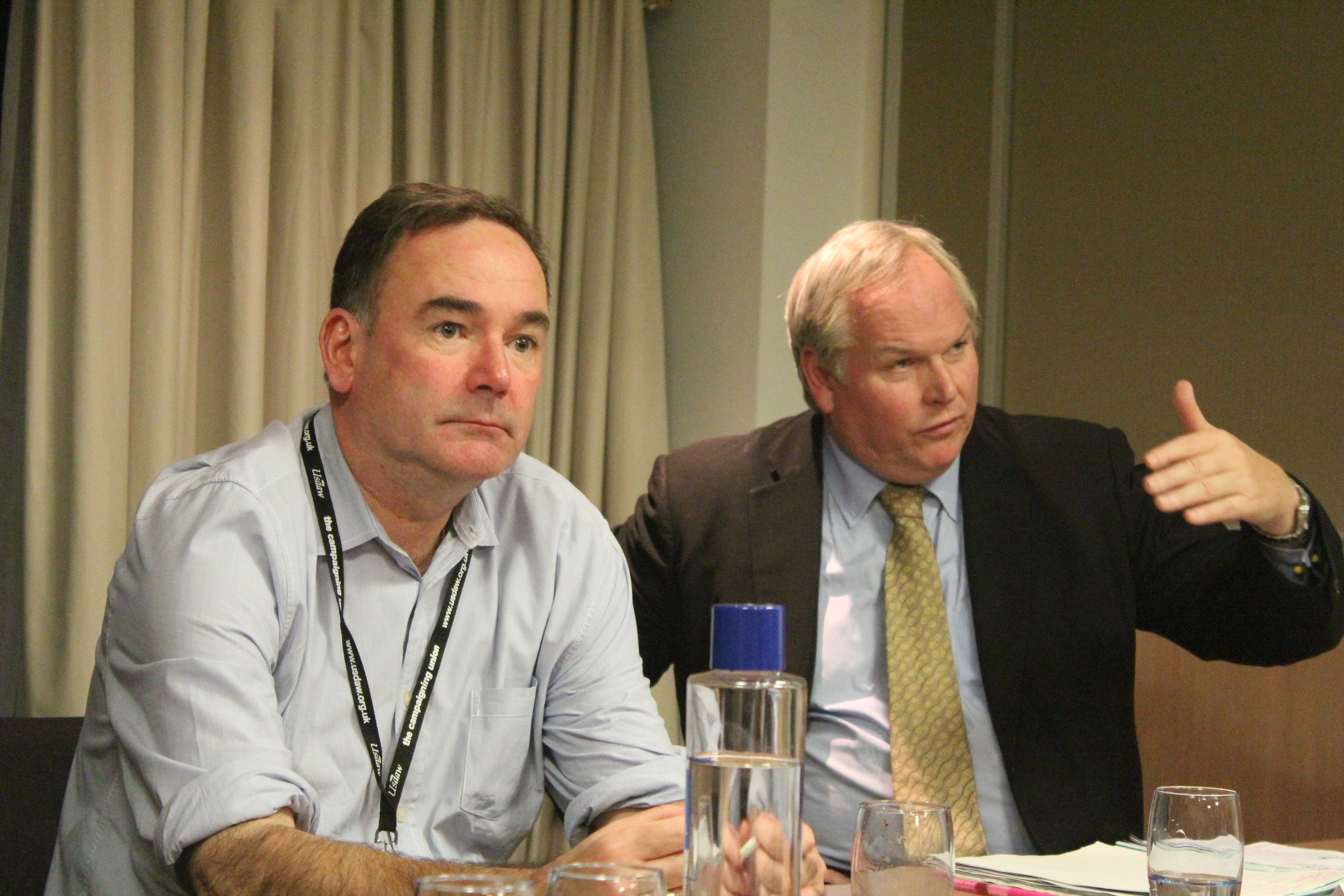
Cruddas (left) speaking alongside Adam Boulton at a Policy Exchange event in 2012

Cruddas's deputy leadership challenge was based on the precepts contained in a pamphlet called 'Fit for purpose: A programme for Labour Party renewal', co-authored with journalist John Harris and funded by the pressure group Compass. Cruddas won a Compass membership poll in March 2007, gaining 53% of first preference votes among the deputy leadership candidates. In terms of his relative position within the Labour Party, newspapers have described Cruddas as "left wing"; however, he has also been described as "modernising centre-left", and more recently has become associated with the socially conservative Blue Labour tendency and has formed a political partnership with James Purnell. He described himself as "mistaken" over his decision to vote for British participation in the 2003 invasion of Iraq and has criticised his party's record on immigration, saying that "we had too many people coming too fast", and that "immigration has been used as a 21st century incomes policy, and protections in terms of the labour market have not been substantial enough."

After speculation that Cruddas, a Catholic, was in favour of restricting abortion, he re-affirmed his pro-choice position. In an interview concerning Cruddas' faith, he stated:

in our family the political heroes weren't Gaitskell or Bevan. They were the Kennedys because they were Irish, there was Óscar Romero because liberation theology was quite a big thing, and Pope John. So I joined the Labour Party, and my brother joined the Carmelites. The Labour Party always seemed to me to be a rational, natural element within some of those things we were brought up to believe in. It was as simple as that. My family was part of the Diaspora, they were all over the world, and again that returned to certain issues of solidarity. So there was always that seamless thing between faith and political agency, and union activity as well, forged out of the politics of Irish immigration".

Cruddas was characterised as "an enthusiastic supporter" of David Cameron's Big Society. Following the 2015 United Kingdom general election, he criticised Labour's anti-austerity approach as the alleged main reason for the party's defeat.

The Times Guide to the House of Commons describes him as "a well-liked and well-respected left winger who took on the BNP and won".

In 2023 Cruddas publicly revealed his opposition to expansion of the Ultra Low Emission Zone (ULEZ) by the Mayor of London Sadiq Khan, calling it "an unwelcome hit on working people".

He is a member of Labour Friends of Israel.

== Personal life ==
Cruddas married Labour activist Anna Healy (now Baroness Healy of Primrose Hill) in 1992; the couple have one son, Emmett Cruddas. His wife worked as a special adviser to Harriet Harman, and had previously worked for Labour MPs Jack Cunningham, Mo Mowlam and Gus Macdonald. He lives in Notting Hill.

In October 2012, Cruddas was banned from driving for eight weeks, for driving with no MOT or insurance.

== Selected works ==
=== Books ===
- The Crash: A View from the Left (edited, with Jonathan Rutherford), London: Lawrence and Wishart, 2008
- The Dignity of Labour, Cambridge: Polity Press, 2021, ISBN 1509540792
- A Century of Labour, Cambridge: Polity Press, 2024, ISBN 1509558349

=== Pamphlets ===
- Equality in the UK (with Jonathan Rutherford, David Laws, Greg Clark), London: CentreForum, 2009, ISBN 9781902622736
- The Future of Social Democracy, London: Compass, 2010
- Building the Good Society: The Project of the Democratic Left (with Andrea Nahles), London: Compass, c. 2013

=== Book chapters and journal articles ===
- "New Labour and the Withering Away of the Working Class?", The Political Quarterly, 77 (2006), pp. 205–13, doi:10.1111/j.1467-923X.2006.00796.x
- "Return to Society" (with Jonathan Rutherford), in What Next for Labour? Ideas for Progressive Left: A Collection of Essays, ed. Peter Harrington and Beatrice Karol Burks, London: Demos, 2009, pp. 19–24, ISBN 9781906693176
- "Ethical Socialism" (with Jonathan Rutherford), Soundings, 44 (2010), pp. 10–21
- "The Common Table" (with Jonathan Rutherford), in Crisis and Recovery Ethics, Economics and Justice, ed. Rowan Williams and Larry Elliott, Basingstoke: Palgrave Macmillan, 2010, pp. 54–76, ISBN 9780230252141
- "Common Life Ethics, Class, Community" (with Jonathan Rutherford), in The Crisis of Global Capitalism: Pope Benedict XVI's Social Encyclical and the Future of Political Economy, ed. Adrian Pabst, Eugene, OR: Wipf and Stock, 2011, pp. 237–54, ISBN 9781608993680
- "The Common Good in an Age of Austerity", in Blue Labour: Forging a New Politics, ed. Ian Geary and Adrian Pabst, London: I.B. Tauris, 2015, pp. 87–95, ISBN 9781784532024
- "Political Economy and the Need for a Moral Critique of Capitalism", Renewal, 26.3 (2018), pp. 45–50
- "The Political Constitution of Labour from Donovan to Blair", Industrial Relations, 51.3 (2020), pp. 225–41, doi:10.1111/irj.12290
- "The Politics of Postcapitalism: Labour and Our Digital Futures" (with Frederick H. Pitts), The Political Quarterly, 91.2 (2020), pp. 275–86
- "Class Composition, Labour's Strategy and the Politics of Work" (with Paul Thompson, Frederick H. Pitts, and Jo Ingold), "The Political Quarterly", 93.1 (2022), pp. 142–9
- "Culture Wars and Class Wars: Labour between Post-Corbynism and Johnsonism" (with Frederick H. Pitts, Paul Thompson, and Jo Ingold), Renewal, 30.3 (2022), pp. 80–94
- "Labour: Past, Present, Future and the 2024 General Election", in Making Equal: New Visions for Opportunity and Growth, ed. Graeme Atherton and Peter John, Leeds: Emerald Publishing, 2025, pp. 235–44, doi:10.1108/978-1-83608-916-220251052

=== News articles ===
- Cruddas, Jon; Rutherford, Jonathan (1 April 2009). "The time has come for a new socialism". The Independent. Archived from the original on 14 June 2022.
- Cruddas, Jon; Rutherford, Jonathan (12 June 2009). "Building the future politics on our toxic present". Tribune. Archived from the original on 2 April 2015.
- Cruddas, Jon; Rutherford, Jonathan (8 January 2010). "Bottom of the class". New Statesman.
- Cruddas, Jon; Rutherford, Jonathan (8 January 2010). "No right turn". New Statesman. 139 (5003): 31–33.
- Cruddas, Jon; Rutherford, Jonathan (21 January 2011). "Selling England by the pound". Progress Magazine. Archived from the original on 26 March 2015.
- Cruddas, Jon (7 November 2013). "George Lansbury memorial lecture". New Statesman.

Parliament of the United Kingdom
Preceded by Judith Church	Member of Parliament for Dagenham; 2001–2010	Constituency abolished
New constituency	Member of Parliament for Dagenham and Rainham; 2010–2024	Succeeded by Margaret Mullane
Party political offices
Preceded by Liam Byrne	Policy Coordinator of the Labour Party; 2012–2018	
