= The Purple Book (Labour Party) =

2011 essay collection

- Author: Various
- Language: English
- Genre: Politics
- Publisher: Biteback Publishing
- Publication date: 14 September 2011
- Publication place: United Kingdom
- Media type: Print (paperback)
- Pages: 320
- ISBN: 978-1849541176

The Purple Book: A Progressive Future For Labour is a 2011 collection of essays by politicians in the UK's Labour Party, many of whom are considered to belong to the Blairite wing of the party. The book was conceived and promoted by Progress, since renamed as Progressive Britain. It has been compared to The Orange Book, published seven years earlier by the then-leading members of the UK's Liberal Democrats.

There are many proposed policies in the Purple Book such as: education credit, universal childcare, insurance-based welfare state, the abolition of higher-rate tax relief, the remutualisation of Northern Rock and other state-owned banks, the extension of directly elected mayors, the abolition of DCLG, extension of cooperatives and a new Department for the Nations and 'hasbos'. The book was endorsed by many in the Labour Party including Ed Miliband, David Miliband and Maurice Glasman but received criticism from Roy Hattersley and Michael Meacher, who in particular felt it was a repetition of Conservative Party policies, though this was rejected by Rachel Reeves.

The book was designed to bring together policy proposals for Labour but to delve into its revisionists roots before Old Labour looking at ideas stemming from the Christian Socialist Movement and R. H. Tawney, calling for an effective and active government not a big state. It also shares some themes from Tony Crosland's book on The Future of Socialism. The book is broadly very supportive of the ideas promoted by Blue Labour; however Peter Mandelson wrote a chapter criticising it.

== Contributors ==
- Ed Miliband (foreword)
- Douglas Alexander
- Peter Mandelson
- Paul Richards
- Tristram Hunt
- John Woodcock
- Patrick Diamond
- Liam Byrne
- Rachel Reeves
- Frank Field
- Liz Kendall
- Tessa Jowell
- Caroline Flint
- Jenny Chapman
- Jacqui Smith
- Ivan Lewis
- Andrew Adonis
- Steve Reed
- Paul Brant
- Stephen Twigg
- Robert Philpot
