= Blue Labour (Pabst and Geary book) =

2015 book by Adrian Pabst

Blue Labour: Forging a New Politics
- Editors: Ian Geary and Adrian Pabst
- Language: English
- Subject: UK politics
- Publisher: I.B. Tauris
- Publication date: 2015
- Publication place: United Kingdom
- Media type: Print (paperback)
- ISBN: 978-1-78453-202-4

Blue Labour: Forging a New Politics is a 2015 book edited by Ian Geary and Adrian Pabst.

== Contents ==
The collection of chapters by different contributors attempts to further articulate the Blue Labour political tendency within the Labour Party and British politics more generally, building on previous books such as The Labour Tradition and the Politics of Paradox: The Oxford London Seminars, 2010–2011 and Tangled Up in Blue.

According to a 2025 article in Prospect, the book has "more than a hint of miserable declinism". The book describes the leadership of the Labour Party at the time, as "Blairite".

== Reception ==
The book received positive reviews by critics.

The Times of Malta reviewed the book very favourably, describing its resonance with Maltese and global politics. Phillip Blond reviewed the book very favourably, describing it as a "wonderful collection".

Rafael Behr described it as "interesting" for the people who are interested in trends in Labour thought.
