= Jonathan Hinder =

British politician (born 1991)

Jonathan Hinder MP
- Official portrait, 2026

Member of Parliament for Pendle and Clitheroe
- Incumbent
- Assumed office 4 July 2024
- Preceded by: Andrew Stephenson (Note: As Member of Parliament for Pendle.)
- Majority: 902 (1.9%)

Personal details
- Born: Jonathan James Hinder; 3 March 1991 (age 35)
- Party: Labour
- Other political affiliations: Blue Labour; Red Wall Caucus
- Spouse: Megan McCann (m. 2026)
- Education: Merton College, Oxford (BA)
- Website: jonathanhinder.com

Jonathan James Hinder (born 3 March 1991) is a British politician and former police officer who has served as the member of Parliament (MP) for Pendle and Clitheroe since 2024. A member of the Labour Party, he is a member of the Red Wall Caucus and a co-founder and leading member of the Blue Labour parliamentary caucus.

Hinder grew up in Downham, Lancashire. He attended Clitheroe Royal Grammar School and Merton College, Oxford before serving in the police force from 2013 to 2022 in London.

In 2022, Hinder left the police force to pursue a career in politics. He joined the Labour Party and in the 2024 general election became the Labour MP for Pendle and Clitheroe after defeating the incumbent Conservative MP Andrew Stephenson. In Parliament, Hinder has campaigned for greater investment into transport and policing. He has called for the Labour Party to abandon liberalism and return to its traditional left-wing, socialist roots with a stricter policy on immigration to reconnect with its main working-class base.

== Early life and career ==
Jonathan James Hinder was born on 3 March 1991. His father, David Hinder, is a Labour Party activist in Ribble Valley. He grew up in Downham and attended Clitheroe Royal Grammar School before he went up to study history and politics at Merton College, Oxford, where he served as JCR President.

After graduating, Hinder joined the police force in London in 2013. He mainly worked in emergency response roles. He also served as the head of the Police Now training academy during this period.

In 2022, Hinder left the police service to pursue a career in politics. He joined the Labour Party and wrote for LabourList and the Fabian Society on crime and policing. In the 2023 Ribble Valley Borough Council election, he stood as a Labour candidate for the ward of St Mary's where he lost to two Liberal Democrat candidates.

== Parliamentary career ==
In November 2023, Hinder was selected in a ballot of local Labour members to stand as Labour's prospective parliamentary candidate for the Pendle and Clitheroe constituency at the 2024 general election. During the election campaign, Hinder criticised the governing Conservative Party for a decline in public services and promoted Labour's proposed National Care Service, green energy generation and career opportunities for young people. He built support on the campaign trail by holding open forums with local residents where they could ask him questions and share their concerns.

At the general election on 4 July, he was elected as the new member of Parliament (MP) for Pendle and Clitheroe with 16,129 votes, a majority of 902, or 1.9%, over the incumbent Conservative MP Andrew Stephenson. Hinder became the first Labour politician to win the Clitheroe area since the 1945 general election. After his victory, Hinder paid tribute to Stephenson and pledged to "work to improve the lives of every single constituent, whether they voted for me or not". He was sworn into Parliament on 10 July and made his maiden speech during a debate on railway nationalisation on 7 September 2024.

In his maiden speech, Hinder called for the restoration of the Skipton–Colne Line and "serious investment in infrastructure […] if we are to see small towns in the north of England thrive and prosper". He joined the Red Wall Caucus of Labour MPs from seats in the Midlands and the North of England which calls for greater economic investment by the government into that region. In September 2024, he said he would prioritise the cost-of-living crisis, green investment, improving public transport and improving the NHS and other public services as an MP. He also set up a constituency office in Colne.

Following his election to Parliament, Hinder voted in favour of the government's planned cuts to the winter fuel payment in September 2024. In November 2024, he voted in favour of Kim Leadbeater's Assisted Dying Bill at its first reading, explaining that he believed the bill was "sufficiently limited in scope to reduce unnecessary suffering for those who wish to shorten a painful death, without causing undue suffering to others". However, he withdrew his support for the bill at its second reading in May 2025 after a provision requiring approval from the High Court for assisted dying was removed, stating that more modifications had to be made to the bill to once again make it "practicable and safe".

In January 2025, Hinder co-founded the parliamentary caucus of the economically left-wing and socially conservative Blue Labour movement with Dan Carden, David Smith and Jonathan Brash. Hinder has become a leading figure in the caucus and is responsible for booking the venues of its meetings in Parliament. In February, he said the Labour Party had to "reconnect with our working-class base in seats like mine of Pendle and Clitheroe" by pursuing "bold, left-wing economic policies, much lower immigration, a complete rejection of divisive identity politics, and proudly reclaiming our patriotism". Following Labour's poor showing in the 2025 local elections, Hinder said the party had to abandon liberalism and return to its traditional left-wing, socialist roots with a stricter policy on immigration to reconnect with its main working-class base who had appeared to shift towards Reform UK over high immigration.

In July 2025, following the Supreme Court decision of For Women Scotland Ltd v The Scottish Ministers, he called for trans women to be excluded from Parkrun, a non-competitive fun run event. The following month, he branded former Conservative minister and Reform UK spokeswoman Ann Widdecombe as "woke right" after she asked Conservative leader Kemi Badenoch to clarify her party's position on placing transgender inmates in prisons by gender.

In May 2026, amid the 2026 Labour Party leadership crisis, Hinder - after having only been an MP for 22 months - called upon Keir Starmer to resign as Prime Minister. Appearing on BBC Newsnight on 11 May, Hinder described a speech made by Starmer that morning as "tone deaf" and "downright insulting", due to its focus on Brexit following poor performance in the recent local elections. When questioned by the Newsnight host, Victoria Derbyshire, as to who should replace Starmer, Hinder refused to answer.

== Political views ==
Ideologically, Hinder is a leading member of the Blue Labour parliamentary caucus of economically left-wing and socially conservative Labour MPs. He has criticised what he sees as the "hyper-liberal" ideology of the Labour Party and in 2025 said the party faced an "existential threat" because it abandoned its traditional left-wing socialist platform for liberalism and pro-immigration policies, after the party's traditional working-class voting base appeared to shift towards Reform UK over high immigration.

=== Immigration ===
Hinder promotes "left-wing economic arguments for low, controlled immigration" as described in 2025; according to Hinder, "high immigration is, of course, the capitalist dream" where "working-class people are generally the losers", with high immigration leading to the exploitation of British workers with increasing inequality and depressed wages caused by an influx of low-paid migrant workers. He has argued that by adopting a stricter policy on immigration and moving back to the left, Labour would remove the appeal of challengers like Reform UK and reconnect the party to its traditional working-class base.

The Labour Party under Keir Starmer has moved in a distinctly Blue Labour direction since 2019, and the Prime Minister has my full support. But we now need to go much further to reconnect with our working-class base in seats like mine of Pendle and Clitheroe, and hundreds like it across the country. That means bold, left-wing economic policies, much lower immigration, a complete rejection of divisive identity politics, and proudly reclaiming our patriotism.

— Jonathan Hinder in February 2025.

In April 2025, Hinder stated that he would not be disappointed if universities went bust due to a reduction in net migration, stating that he was "happy to be bold and say, ‘I don’t think we should have anywhere near as many universities and university places'", and that he would not be disappointed, during a speech with conservative group Civic Future.

In May 2025, Hinder called for an effective freeze on immigration with the introduction of a "one in, one out" system of migration. He also called for the government to implement an annual cap on accepting refugees and to reform the asylum system to remove "every legal obstacle" preventing the removal of illegal boats crossing the English channel, including withdrawal from the European Convention of Human Rights if necessary. In April 2025, he said there needed to be a deterrent against illegal immigration, but criticised the Rwanda asylum plan as "chaotic". He also criticised the high numbers of international students at British universities and said that he was "not that disappointed" if reducing international student numbers would lead to the bankruptcy of universities which depended on international fees, adding that the nation should not have "anywhere near as many universities" which he described as "popping out degrees of dubious quality, of dubious value to the economy". He has supported the Labour government's planned reforms to reduce immigration and the government's review of human rights legislation related to illegal immigration.

In October 2025, speaking at an event for group More In Common, he responded to Keir Starmer's labelling of Reform UK's proposals for legal migrants to reapply as racist and immoral, defending Keir Starmers views but also cautioned against branding Reform UK policies as racist. He stated “I think we’ve got to be very careful, because people who don’t pay attention to politics – and that’s, let’s be honest, most voters – can easily misinterpret what we say."

=== Economy ===
Hinder has regularly criticised free market and Thatcherite economics, attributing "an unshakeable faith in free market Capitalism" for the economic ills of his constituency, particularly the decline of manufacturing and the textile industry. Hinder has criticised the "Treasury Orthodoxy" and a lack of intervention from the government. In 2025, he said the government had "given away much of its decision-making power" to unelected quangos such as NHS England, the Bank of England and the Office of Budget Responsibility, which he criticised for causing a lack of democratic accountability on economic policy. He has criticised New Labour's decision in 1997 to grant the Bank of England independent decision-making powers over interest rates for this reason and has called on elected politicians to "take back control" over policy-making and public services. He has criticised the privatisation of public services and industries since the 1980s, including water, steel, rail, mail and energy, to private firms, "[m]any of them based overseas. Their priority purely being profit". Hinder has credited privatisation with rising bills, failing services and a decline in public infrastructure, and believes that the government should nationalise key industries and services and bring them back into public ownership.

=== Infrastructure ===
Since his election to Parliament, Hinder has campaigned for greater investment into transport and policing services and the restoration of the Skipton–Colne Line in particular. He dedicated his maiden speech to this issue, explaining that the nation needed "serious investment in infrastructure, such as by reinstating the short rail link between Colne in Lancashire and Skipton in North Yorkshire, if we are to see small towns in the north of England thrive and prosper". In 2025, he said investment into transport services was needed to "unlock the potential of our towns" and said a new Skipton–Colne Line would be a "game changer […] that would dramatically improve economic prospects for deprived areas across East Lancashire, well beyond my constituency".

=== Puberty blockers ===
In December 2025, Hinder commented on the King's College London Pathways Trial which dealt with the subject of gender dysphoria, a randomised controlled trial to explore the effects of puberty suppressing hormones among young people with gender dysphoria (incongruence), stating that it was "dangerous gender madness" and a "drug experiment" stating that "will put them on the path to sterilisation, lack of sexual function, and needing medical treatment for life".

== Personal life ==
Hinder is married and lives in Clitheroe. He is a fan of football and cricket.

Parliament of the United Kingdom
New constituency	Member of Parliament for Pendle and Clitheroe; 2024–present	Incumbent
