= Henning Meyer =

German social scientist, consultant and policy specialist

- Born: 1978 (age 47–48)
- Education: University of Oxford, University of London, London Metropolitan University, London Guildhall University, University of Trier
- Known for: Social scientist

Henning Meyer is a German social scientist, consultant and policy specialist. He is the first Fellow of the German Federal Ministry of Finance and honorary professor for Public Policy and Business at the Eberhard Karls University of Tübingen. Furthermore, he is research associate at Cambridge University’s Centre for Business Research (CBR), Future World Fellow at the Centre for the Governance of Change at IE University and founder and editor-in-chief of Social Europe. Previously, he was John F. Kennedy Memorial Fellow at the Minda de Gunzburg Center for European Studies at Harvard University, senior visiting fellow and research associate at the London School of Economics and Political Science and visiting fellow at Cornell University.

== Education ==
After undergraduate studies in political science and English at the University of Trier, Meyer continued his education in the UK. He studied for an MA in British and European politics and government at London Guildhall University, a PhD in comparative politics and an Executive MBA at London Metropolitan University, an MSc in finance with a focus on economic policy at the University of London as well as a diploma in global business at the University of Oxford. At Oxford, Meyer won two Said Prizes as best overall student and for the best project in global business.

== Career ==
Until 2010, Meyer was senior research fellow and head of the European Programme at the Global Policy Institute at London Metropolitan University. Following this, he was director of the consultancy New Global Strategy Ltd. and the digital media publishing company Social Europe Ltd. until he relocated to Germany in 2018. He is an expert on public policy, social democracy, political economy, European Union, digital technology, strategy and business.

== Media ==
Meyer has been a frequent contributor to academic and mainstream publications such as The Guardian, The New York Times, Foreign Affairs, Die Zeit and Süddeutsche Zeitung. He is also a regular TV commentator on political and economic issues on news channels such as BBC News, Sky News, CNBC, Al Jazeera International, France 24 and SBS Broadcasting Group Australia.

== Selected bibliography ==
=== Books ===
- Meyer, Henning; Rutherford, Jonathan (2012). The future of European social democracy: building the good society. Basingstoke: Palgrave Macmillan. ISBN 9780230290938.

=== Chapters in books ===
- Meyer, Henning; Rutherford, Jonathan (2012), "Introduction: building the good society", in Meyer, Henning; Rutherford, Jonathan (eds.), The future of European social democracy: building the good society, Hampshire, UK: Palgrave Macmillan, pp. 3–12, ISBN 9780230290938.
- Meyer, Henning (2012), "The challenge of European social democracy: communitarianism and cosmopolitanism united", in Meyer, Henning; Rutherford, Jonathan (eds.), The future of European social democracy: building the good society, Hampshire, UK: Palgrave Macmillan, pp. 152–165, ISBN 9780230290938.
- Meyer, Henning; Rutherford, Jonathan (2012), "Conclusion: the way ahead", in Meyer, Henning; Rutherford, Jonathan (eds.), The future of European social democracy: building the good society, Hampshire, UK: Palgrave Macmillan, pp. 195–197, ISBN 9780230290938.
