= Maurice Glasman, Baron Glasman =

English political theorist, academic, social commentator (born 1961)

The Right Honourable The Lord Glasman
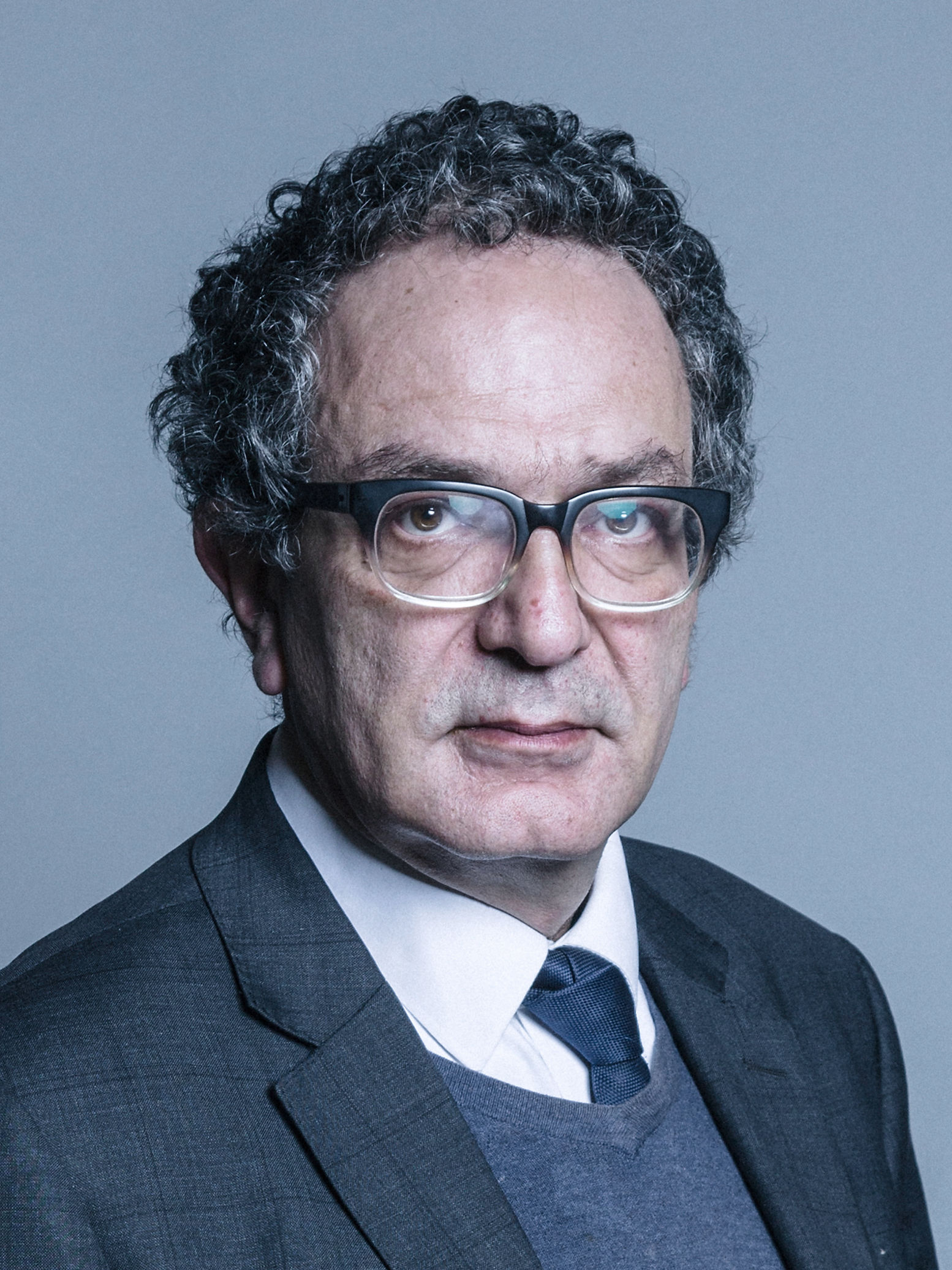
- Official portrait, 2018

Member of the House of Lords
- Lord Temporal
- Life peerage 4 February 2011

Personal details
- Born: Maurice Glasman; 8 March 1961 (age 65) Walthamstow, London, England
- Party: Labour
- Other political affiliations: Blue Labour
- Spouse: Catherine Glasman
- Children: 4
- Education: St Catharine's College, Cambridge (BA); University of York (MA); European University Institute (PhD)
- Occupation: Academic; peer

Maurice Glasman, Baron Glasman (born 8 March 1961) is an English political theorist, academic, social commentator, and Labour life peer in the House of Lords. He is a senior lecturer in Political Theory at London Metropolitan University, Director of its Faith and Citizenship Programme and a columnist for the New Statesman, UnHerd, Tablet and Spiked. He is best known as the leader of the socially conservative socialist movement Blue Labour, which he founded in 2009.

== Early life and education ==
Glasman was born in Walthamstow, north-east London into a Jewish family and brought up in Palmers Green. His father Coleman "Collie" Glasman, a Labour Zionist, had a small toy manufacturing business that eventually collapsed. His mother Rivie Glasman, the daughter of a poor family from Stamford Hill, was a lifelong Labour supporter. Glasman was educated at Clapton Jewish Day School (now Simon Marks Jewish Primary School) and the Jews' Free School, where he won an exhibition to study Modern History at St Catharine's College, Cambridge.

A trumpeter, he became a jazz musician for four years and then gained an MA in Political Philosophy at the University of York and a PhD at the European University Institute in Florence with a thesis on market economies, which was published in 1996 under the title Unnecessary Suffering. Glasman cites political thinkers from Aristotle to Edmund Burke to the Hungarian economist and sociologist Karl Polanyi as major influences on his politics.

== Career ==
Glasman was a professor at Johns Hopkins University's European centre in Bologna. After his father's death in 1995, he returned to the United Kingdom. He is a senior lecturer in Political Theory at London Metropolitan University and Director of its Faith and Citizenship Programme. According to his website, "his research interests focus on the relationship between citizenship and faith and the limits of the market".

In April 2009, he launched the Blue Labour "left-conservative" pressure group within the Labour Party. He has acted since as Blue Labour's chief ideologist, while entrusting the group's effective leadership to its other leading thinker, Jon Cruddas.

On 19 November 2010, it was announced that he would be created a life peer. Prior to his elevation, he worked for ten years with London Citizens and through this developed an expertise in community organising.

On 4 February 2011, he was created Baron Glasman of Stoke Newington and of Stamford Hill in the London Borough of Hackney by Queen Elizabeth II and was introduced into the House of Lords on 8 March 2011, where he sits on the Labour benches. His elevation to the Lords was considered something of a surprise, with Glasman admitting that he was "completely shocked" by the appointment.

In 2012, Glasman criticised Labour leader Ed Miliband for pursuing a "sectional agenda" overreliant on votes from disaffected Liberal Democrat voters and public sector workers, saying that Miliband had "no strategy, no narrative and little energy". Former deputy prime minister John Prescott tweeted in response: "Glasman. You know sod all about politics, economic policy, Labour or solidarity. Bugger off and go ‘organise’ some communities." Glasman says that after this altercation he did not speak to any media for the following three years.

Nonetheless, he continued to work with Jon Cruddas as policy review coordinator in Miliband's Shadow Cabinet between 2012 and 2015, and was credited by Mark Ferguson with inspiring Miliband's One Nation Labour.

He joined Labour Together soon after its inception in 2015 and helped Cruddas persuade Nevsky Capital founder Trevor Chinn and hedge fund manager Martin Taylor to provide the initial £75,000 of funding for the group before 2017. Labour Together was created by John Clarke, a former Blue Labour director, with the aim of opposing the leadership of Jeremy Corbyn and trying to win control of the party in a future leadership election. After 2017 it came to support Keir Starmer as a future leadership candidate.

In June 2024, Maurice Glasman, Jon Cruddas and Jonathan Rutherford launched a "Future of the Left" project at the conservative think-tank Policy Exchange.

Glasman was the only figure in the Labour Party to be invited to the second inauguration of Donald Trump in January 2025. He accepted the welcome gift of handmade cowboy boots from the Trump team before meeting with Vice-President JD Vance (who had sent him a copy of his book Hillbilly Elegy in 2016), the former Trump strategist Steve Bannon, and Secretary of State Marco Rubio. He also attended Nigel Farage's party opposite the White House and spent "a significant amount of time" with Farage during his visit. He said he had used his visit to "defend the Labour Party" by telling those around Donald Trump: "You've mistaken us – we're not a liberal party, we're the Labour Party."

In January 2025, Glasman revealed he is planning to start a show on GB News – “Blue Labour versus Reform” – which will see him debate with Nigel Farage on a weekly basis.

== Political opinions ==
Having joined the Labour Party in 1976, Glasman re-engaged with Labour politics after his mother's death in 2008. Glasman coined the term "Blue Labour" in 2008, defining it as "a deeply conservative socialism that places family, faith and work at the heart of a new politics of reciprocity, mutuality and solidarity". Glasman described it as a "small-c" conservative form of socialism which advocates a return to what Glasman believed were the roots of the pre-1945 Labour Party by encouraging the political involvement of voluntary groups from trade unions through churches to football clubs. Blue Labour has argued that Labour should embrace patriotism and a return to community values based on trade unions and voluntary groups which he claims was evident in early Labour politics, but it was lost after 1945 with the rise of the welfare state.

In a critical assessment of Glasman's political philosophy, Alan Finlayson asserts that Glasman emphasises ethical social institution rather than moral individualism, criticises commodification and the money economy and seeks to revive the concept of the "common good" at the forefront of British politics. Glasman's role in the creation and promotion of Blue Labour is described in the book Tangled Up in Blue (2011) by Rowenna Davis. Glasman himself says that in developing the concept of Blue Labour he was inspired by the Bund, the secular Jewish Socialist Party in Lithuania, Poland and Russia founded in 1897; and the writings of 19th-century German rabbi Samson Raphael Hirsch. He also points out the connections between the living wage and the demand of the Jewish trade unions in the East End for a family wage. Glasman has cited the Polish Solidarity movement and social teachings of pope John Paul II as Blue Labour's ideological foundations. Calling the former "his first object of love as a young socialist", he remarked however that Polish people have since "urinated on that inheritance" by adopting free market policies.

In April 2011, Glasman called on the Labour Party to establish a dialogue with sympathisers of the far-right English Defence League (EDL) in order to challenge their views and "to build a party that brokers a common good, that involves those people who support the EDL within our party. Not dominant in the party, not setting the tone of the party, but just a reconnection with those people that we can represent a better life for them, because that's what they want".

In July 2011, Glasman called for some immigration to be temporarily halted and for the right of free movement of labour, a key provision of the Treaty of Rome, to be abrogated, dividing opinion among Labour commentators.

Emphasising that Israel should not be "demonised", Glasman says he does not like Israel, where in his opinion "terrible things [are] going on", adding that "the Jewish settler movement is as bad as Islamic jihadist supremacists. What I see with jihadists and settlers is nationalist domination, and yuck is my general verdict". However, he accepted the visiting professorship he was offered by Haifa University, telling The Jewish Chronicle: "If people I know say they want to boycott Israel, I say they should start by boycotting me". At the 2016 Limmud conference, he suggested the Labour Party's antisemitism harked back to Jewish Marxists, who wanted to "liberate Jews" from their Judaism.

In a House of Lords debate on the European Union (Notification of Withdrawal) Bill on 20 February 2017, Lord Glasman referred to the fact he campaigned for Britain to leave the European Union in the 2016 referendum.

He was a personal friend of conservative philosopher Roger Scruton and the two inspired each other ideologically. After Scruton's death in 2020, Glasman eulogised him in an obituary on UnHerd.

Speaking at the Postliberalism Conference in December 2024, Glasman celebrated the victory of Donald Trump, which he said was "world historical", and described it as "a multi-racial, multi-ethnic, interfaith, working-class coalition against progressives – that's the enormity of what we're talking about. Kamala Harris was for they/them, President Trump is for you. That's all you really need to know about the American election". He later described one of his "political missions" as "to reclaim the rainbow from the ownership of transsexuals". Glasman also declared, in the aftermath of Trump's second election, that "the only place to build a house now is on the left side of MAGA square", which he understands as the faction represented by Steve Bannon. Morgan Jones and David Klemperer, co-editors of Renewal, said that by choosing to align with the MAGA movement, Glasman sided with forces which threaten social democracy, and which today represent its primary antagonist.

In 2025, Glasman gave the Annual Address of the Global Warming Policy Foundation, a British climate change denialist think-tank. During his speech, he compared the climate crisis to past beliefs in an "imminent apocalypse", noting that "all of [those] predictions were wrong", implying that the overwhelming scientific consensus on the climate crisis was similarly misguided. This is contrary to the extensive body of conclusive scientific research, and Glasman offered no evidence to back up his claims. He criticised the "progressive orthodoxy" that "weird is normal", calling it "idiocy masquerading as reason", and blaming universities as the "main incubators" of progressivism. He also claimed that the BBC "would be in a better state today" if it had "stayed static ... in 1973". He called Net Zero "fantastical and incoherent" and endorsed the expansion of the North Sea oil and gas industry, and said that Britain should consider reopening its coal mines.

In September 2025, Glasman called for HM Treasury to be "abolished", with its powers moved to the prime minister and a new economics ministry, in order to trigger an industrial revival based on heavy industry and vocational jobs in place of white collar work. He also called to "close down half of universities and turn them into vocational colleges". In November that year, he was a keynote speaker at the annual conference of the Together Declaration, a group with ties with Reform UK.

== Personal life ==
Glasman is a supporter of Jewish tradition, regularly goes to a synagogue on Shabbat and is a founder member of the Masorti Jewish congregation New Stoke Newington Shul. His wife Catherine, who is not Jewish, has also become "engaged with Judaism", according to The Jewish Chronicle. Glasman has described the Bible as "the greatest book of our shared civilisation" and said that Noah and the Ark is "the most important Bible story". He plays the guitar and trumpet and smokes rolled-up cigarettes. As of 2022, he and Catherine are "amicably separated" and he lives in "a small flat in Dalston".

== Publications ==
- Maurice Glasman (2022). Blue Labour: The Politics of the Common Good. Polity.
- Maurice Glasman; Jonathan Rutherford; Marc Stears; Stuart White, eds. (2011). The Labour Tradition and the Politics of Paradox: The Oxford London Seminars 2010-11. The Oxford-London Seminars. Soundings Journal.
- Maurice Glasman (5 January 2012). "Ed Miliband must trust his instincts and stand up for real change". New Statesman.
- —— (1 November 2012). "Blue Labour and Labour History". Anglia Ruskin University, Labour History Research Unit. Archived from the original on 14 May 2013.
- —— (3 May 2013). "Catholic Social Teaching as Political Economy". Centre for Catholic Studies and University College Durham University.
- —— (Winter 2010). "Labour as a radical tradition" (PDF). Soundings, Number 46. pp. 31–41. Archived from the original (PDF) on 20 March 2012.
- —— (8 November 2008). "The Secret of Obama's success".
- —— (4 February 2006). "Losing Your Rag".
- —— (1996). Unnecessary Suffering: Managing Market Utopia. Verso. ISBN 9781859849767.
- —— (May–June 1994). "The Great Deformation: Polanyi, Poland, and the Terrors of Planned Spontaneity". New Left Review (205).

Orders of precedence in the United Kingdom
Preceded by The Lord Stephen	Gentlemen; Baron Glasman	Followed by The Lord Blencathra
