= Marc Stears =

British political theorist

- Born: 1971 (age 54–55)
- Known for: Political thinker and academic

Marc Stears (born 1971) is a British political theorist. He is Director of the UCL Policy Lab, based at University College London, having previously led the Sydney Policy Lab at The University of Sydney. Before arriving in Sydney in 2018, Marc had been Chief Executive of the New Economics Foundation. He was previously Professor of Political Theory and Fellow of University College, Oxford. His published works have focussed mainly on the development of progressive political movements in the UK and the USA. He was a leading thinker in the Blue Labour movement. He was formerly chief speechwriter to Ed Miliband during the Labour leader's unsuccessful 2015 General Election campaign.

== Biography ==
Raised in South Wales, Stears became first interested in the impact of politics and political systems on people's lives from an early age and went on to read Politics, Philosophy and Economics at Corpus Christi College, Oxford. Following positions at Nuffield College, Oxford, the University of Bristol and Emmanuel College, Cambridge, Stears became University Lecturer in Political Theory and Director of the Centre for Political Ideologies at University College, Oxford. In 2011 he became a member of the Institute for Public Policy Research, looking particularly at the relationship between the state and society.

Stears is one of the editors of "The Labour tradition and the politics of paradox" along with Maurice Glasman, Jonathan Rutherford and Stuart White. This book came out of a series of seminars in Oxford and London, which seek to find a new direction for the Labour Party after its 2010 electoral defeat.

According to Guardian journalist Jessica Elgot, on September 7, 2026, Stears will join Prime Minister Andy Burnham's team as a special advisor.

== Selected works ==
- Progressives, Pluralists, and the Problems of the State: Ideologies of Reform in the United States and Britain, 1909-1926, (OUP, 2006)
- Political Theory: Methods and Approaches (OUP, 2008) (co-editor with David Leopold)
- Demanding Democracy: American Radicals in Search of a New Politics (Princeton, 2010)
