= Conservative Co-operative Movement =

UK political organisation

The Conservative Co-operative Movement
- The Conservative Co-operative Society Limited
- Abbreviation: CCM
- Formation: 2007
- Headquarters: Craigower; Woodland Rise; Sevenoaks; Kent; TN15 0HZ
- Affiliations: The Conservative Party
- Website: conservativecoops.com

The Conservative Co-operative Movement was a political organisation promoting co-operatives and co-operative ideals within the British Conservative Party. The organisation advocated for "alternative models of capitalism", though it faced criticism within the wider co-operative movement which has traditionally been left leaning, with a history of affiliation with the Labour Party through the Co-operative Party. The organisation appears to have become inactive.

== History ==
The Conservative Co-operative Movement was founded in 2007 by then Conservative activist Jesse Norman. The organisation aimed to help people set up their own co-ops to tackle social problems and improve local areas. Its immediate impact on Conservative Party policy embedded his vision through which communities could own and run some of their own public services. Norman was elected to Parliament in the 2010 general election.

== Activities ==
According to its website, the movement promoted "alternative models of capitalism". The work of the movement was referenced in the Conservative Party's 2010 general election proposals.

== See also ==
- Blue Labour
