= Jo Littler =

British sociologist and cultural theorist

Jo Littler FAcSS
- Born: 1972 (age 53–54)
- Occupations: Professor of Cultural, Media and Social Analysis

Academic background
- Education: University of Sussex

Academic work
- Discipline: Sociology and Cultural studies
- Institutions: Goldsmiths, University of London

Jo Littler FAcSS (born 1972) is a British sociologist and cultural theorist. She is known for her contributions to sociology and cultural studies, particularly her critiques of meritocracy and social and cultural inequality.

== Academic career ==
Littler started her academic career teaching interdisciplinary modules part time at the University of Sussex. In 2000, she took up a post in Media and Cultural Studies at Middlesex University. In 2012 she joined City, University of London, where she later became Professor in the Department of Sociology. In 2023, she joined Goldsmiths, University of London as Professor of Cultural, Media and Social Analysis.

Littler was elected a Fellow of the Academy of Social Sciences in 2024.

== Public roles ==
Littler co-edits the European Journal of Cultural Studies and is a member of the editorial board of Soundings: A Journal of Politics and Culture.

She serves as a judge for the Stuart Hall Foundation's Essay Prize and is a trustee of the Barry Amiel and Norman Melburn Trust.

== Key publications ==
- Littler, Jo. Left Feminisms: Conversations on the Personal and the Political. London: Lawrence & Wishart, 2023.
- The Care Collective (Andreas Chatzidakis, Jamie Hakim, Jo Littler, Catherine Rottenberg, and Lynne Segal). The Care Manifesto: The Politics of Interdependence. London: Verso, 2020. Translated into multiple languages.
- Littler, Jo. Against Meritocracy: Culture, Power and Myths of Mobility. London: Routledge, 2018.
- Keller, Jessalyn; Littler, Jo; and Winch, Alison (eds.). An Intergenerational Feminist Media Studies: Conflicts and Connectivities. London: Taylor & Francis, 2018.
- Binkley, Sam; and Littler, Jo (eds.). Anti-consumerism and Cultural Studies. London: Taylor & Francis, 2011.
- Littler, Jo. Radical Consumption: Shopping for Change in Contemporary Culture. Maidenhead: Open University Press, 2009.
- Littler, Jo; and Naidoo, Roshi (eds.). The Politics of Heritage: The Legacies of ‘Race’. London: Routledge, 2005.
