= Rowenna Davis =

British politician and journalist (born 1985)

- Davis in 2015
- Born: 28 February 1985 (age 41); Lewisham, London, England
- Education: Balliol College, Oxford
- Occupations: Teacher and journalist
- Notable work: Tangled Up in Blue
- Political party: Labour and Co-operative

Rowenna Davis (born 28 February 1985) is a British author and journalist. She has written numerous articles for publications such as the New Statesman, The Guardian, The Sun and The Economist. In 2011, Davis authored Tangled Up in Blue, an examination of the rise of the Blue Labour movement. Since 2022 she has been Labour Party councillor representing Waddon ward in the London Borough of Croydon. She has worked as a teacher and political journalist. She has previously been a Labour councillor for the London Borough of Southwark and contested the parliamentary seat of Southampton Itchen in the 2015 general election and the Croydon mayoral election in 2026.

== Early life and education ==
Davis was born in Lewisham and spent her early years in Portsmouth and Catford before her family moved to North London, where she attended the comprehensive Hampstead School. At the age of fourteen, she organised a protest against the quality of the school meals provided by Serco. Home-cooked, healthy food was offered in a rival, all-you-can-eat tuck shop and the students boycotted the official canteen, forcing them to change their menu within two weeks. In 2003 she and two schoolfriends organised 'Hands Up For Peace' in response to the war in Iraq. This led to thousands of other students making a hand-print bearing their name and a message of peace. These were then printed out, attached to sticks and planted in Parliament Square to make a protest with the intention of influencing Prime Minister Tony Blair.

After leaving school, she read Politics, Philosophy and Economics at Balliol College, Oxford. In 2005, while still an undergraduate, she won the Oxford Leadership Prize which is a contest requiring an essay on a contemporary issue of political leadership. Her winning essay, "Invisible Leaders", was presented in a novel audio format and won her the prize of £4,000. Her leadership models were those that "create space and opportunity for action". She subsequently undertook a postgraduate MA degree in journalism from City University London.

== Journalism ==
Since graduating from Oxford University, Davis has worked as an intern at Bloomberg News and as a freelance journalist, writing for publications such as The Guardian, The Independent, the New Statesman, the Mail on Sunday, The Economist, The Times, the Times Higher Education and the Financial Times. Davis has appeared as a political commentator for a variety of current affairs television and radio programmes such as Daily Politics, The Politics Show, Newsnight, Sunday Politics and Sky News.

In September 2011, she published the book Tangled Up in Blue, which is an account of the development of Blue Labour, a movement within the Labour Party founded by Lord Glasman.

== Political and teaching career ==
In 2010, Davis stood as the Labour candidate for the Cathedrals ward of Southwark, but lost to a Liberal Democrat candidate. She entered a Microsoft contest of ideas for the 18–25 age group and won £10,000 of sponsorship for her plan to engage unemployed, young people in local government, encouraging them to become councillors. In May 2011, she was herself elected to Southwark Council as councillor in the Lane ward of Peckham which she won with a swing from the Lib Dems of 12%. As a councillor, she campaigned against the proliferation of betting shops in the borough.

On 13 July 2013, Davis was selected as the Labour Parliamentary Candidate for Southampton Itchen, Although Davis was criticised for her lack of connections to Southampton, the retiring MP John Denham endorsed her, saying "I know that Rowenna Davis has the drive and vision to represent Southampton superbly in the years ahead...". She lost to Conservative Royston Smith by 2,316 votes (5.2%) in the 2015 United Kingdom general election.

In June 2015, Davis announced via Twitter that she was training to become a teacher. In 2019, she was teaching English at Harris Invictus Academy Croydon.

In 2019, Davis put herself forward for selection as Labour's candidate for Croydon and Sutton in the 2020 London Assembly election but was not selected. In 2022 she was elected to represent the Waddon ward of Croydon Council. In 2026, she placed second in the Croydon mayoral election, with 29.7% of the vote.
