= Social Europe =

European digital media publisher

Social Europe is a European digital media publisher, social democratic think tank and forum for debate. Their stated mission is to use the values of freedom, sustainability and equality as a foundation for its contributors to examine important policy issues. It was founded by Henning Meyer, Detlev Albers and Stephen Haseler and is published by Social Europe Publishing & Consulting GmbH based in Berlin, having been previously published from London from 2005 to 2018.

Since its foundation, Social Europe has published authors such as Zygmunt Bauman Sheri Berman, Jayati Gosh, Jürgen Habermas, Michael Higgins, Paul Mason, and Adam Tooze. Articles published on Social Europe have been commented on or referenced in publications such as The Atlantic, The Guardian, Harvard Business Review and Die Zeit.

Social Europe was the winner of a 2018 .eu Web Award in the House of EU category. The House of EU award presented annually by EURid celebrates the best website that represent blogs, news outlets, and the media.
