= European Journal of Cultural Studies =

- Discipline: Cultural studies
- Language: English
- Edited by: Yiu Fai Chow, Jilly Kay, Jo Littler, Anamik Saha

Publication details
- History: 1998-present
- Publisher: SAGE Publications
- Frequency: Quarterly
- Impact factor: 2.4 (2022)

Standard abbreviations
- ISO 4: Eur. J. Cult. Stud.

Indexing
- ISSN: 1367-5494 (print); 1460-3551 (web)
- OCLC no.: 38868540

Links
- Journal homepage; Online access; Online archive

The European Journal of Cultural Studies is a major international, peer-reviewed academic journal originally founded in Europe by Pertti Alasuutari, Ann Gray and Joke Hermes. It adopts a broad-ranging view of cultural studies, charting new questions and new research, and mapping the transformations of cultural studies. The journal publishes well theorized empirically grounded work from a variety of locations and disciplinary backgrounds. It engages in critical discussions on power relations concerning gender, class, sexual preference, ethnicity and other macro or micro sites of political struggle. It also includes a ‘Cultural Commons’ section publishing short-form articles including interviews and ‘rapid response' pieces.

The journal's current editors-in-chief are Yiu Fai Chow (Hong Kong Baptist University), Jayson Harsin (American University of Paris), Jilly Kay (Loughborough University), Anamik Saha (University of Leeds) and Francesca Sobande (Cardiff University). It was established in 1998 and is published by SAGE Publications.

== Abstracting and indexing ==
The European Journal of Cultural Studies is abstracted and indexed in Scopus with a CiteScore of 5.500 and is ranked 25 out of 1304 cultural studies journals. According to the Journal Citation Reports, its 2022 impact factor is 2.4, ranking it 5th out of 44 journals in the category cultural studies.
