= Progress (organisation) =

Organisation associated with the British Labour Party

- Formation: 1996; 30 years ago
- Founders: Paul Richards; Liam Byrne; Derek Draper
- Legal status: Company limited by guarantee
- Headquarters: London, England
- Director: Adam Langleben
- Website: www.progressonline.org.uk

Progress is a political organisation associated with the British Labour Party, founded in 1996 to support the New Labour leadership of Tony Blair. It is seen as being on the right of the party.

Progress merged with Policy Network in May 2021 to form Progressive Britain. The organisation rebranded back to Progress in celebration of their thirtieth birthday in January 2026. Progress publishes polling and research on internal Labour politics, government policy and legislation, as well as organising conferences and other events.

== Aims ==
Until 2014, Progress stated it was "the New Labour pressure group which aims to promote a radical and progressive politics for the 21st century." From late 2014, Progress stopped using the "New Labour" label and rebranded itself as "Labour's new mainstream, aim[ing] to promote a radical and progressive politics".

Its aims were:

Progress is an organisation of Labour party members which aims to promote a radical and progressive politics for the 21st century.

We seek to discuss, develop and advance the means to create a more free, equal and democratic Britain, which plays an active role in Europe and the wider world.

Diverse and inclusive, we work to improve the level and quality of debate both within the Labour party, and between the party and the wider progressive community.

After the merger with Policy Network and reforming as Progressive Britain the stated aims are:

Progressive Britain is the new platform for policymaking, political education, and imaginative thinking to rebuild Labour and the Nation. Rooted in the Labour Party, we are dedicated to national renewal through the intellectual revitalisation of the UK centre-left. Key to this is our re-dedication as a think-tank – and our ongoing work bringing politicians, policymakers, experts, and activists together to shape Labour’s next winning policy platform.

== History ==
Progress was founded in 1996 by Paul Richards, Liam Byrne and Derek Draper as an organisation to maintain a dialogue between voters and members of the Party with Labour's new leadership under Tony Blair. It has organised many events and conferences, and hosted several important speeches by senior party figures. Its annual conference has become a staple of the political calendar, falling on the first weekend after the May local elections with many cabinet ministers and other leading politicians attending.

Established in 1995, the organisation’s patrons included Baroness Jay of Paddington, Gerald Kaufman, former Labour Party chair Tony Clarke, Baron Clarke of Hampstead (1992–1993), and Sir Jeremy Beecham. Its trustees were Michael Montague, Baron Montague of Oxford and Joyce Hytner.

Between 1995 and 1998, under the direction of Derek Draper (director), Kate Dixon (editor), and Helen Garrod (deputy editor), Progress published quarterly magazines—beginning in February 1996—organised weekend and day schools across the country for party activists, and hosted events at Labour Party conferences.

The inauguration of Progress at its Carteret Street office in central London in early 1996 was attended by figures including former Prime Minister James Callaghan and Gordon Brown. The organisation’s stated aims at its founding were to "provide political education and training opportunities to Labour Party members, building their knowledge and confidence, enabling them to develop themselves and win support for Labour's ideas". The first edition of the magazine featured contributions from Tony Blair, John Prescott, and Brian Wilson, and included an economics supplement with articles by Gordon Brown and Ian McCartney.

In May 2014 Progress dropped using the "New Labour" label that had been introduced by Tony Blair.

In February 2019, a group of MPs left the Labour Party and founded The Independent Group. All seven founding members of this group were members of Progress and regularly contributed to the work of the organisation.

On 16 May 2021, Progress announced that it was merging with thinktank Policy Network to form an organisation named Progressive Britain that would be "dedicated to the intellectual revitalisation of the centre-left" and "championing the revival of progressive social democracy".

On its 30th anniversary celebration for Progress, Executive Director Adam Langleben announced the organisation would rebrand back to Progress and told the audience that over the thirty years "hundreds of Labour MPs are Progress alumni, alongside thousands of Senedd members, Scottish Parliament members, councillors and leaders across the country." Cabinet members and longtime supporters of the organisation Rachel Reeves, Wes Streeting, Bridget Phillipson, Pat McFadden, Liz Kendall, Steve Reed, Chief Whip Jonathan Reynolds and the Prime Minister's Chief of Staff Morgan McSweeney were all present at the occasion.

== Publications ==
From 1996 to 2018, Progress published a monthly magazine, this was brought back to quarterly circulation in 2025 with recent features and interviews including Prime Minister Sir Keir Starmer, Education Secretary Bridget Phillipson, Health Secretary Wes Streeting, Work and Pensions Secretary Pat McFadden, Solicitor General Ellie Reeves, Mayor of South Yorkshire Oliver Coppard, Mayor of North East England Kim McGuinness, AI and Online Safety Minister Kanishka Narayan, Homelessness and Local Government Minister Alison McGovern, senior advisor and strategist to Prime Minister's Brown, Blair and Starmer Baroness Deborah Mattinson.

Progress also published The Purple Book, in September 2011, exploring fresh non-statist policies for Labour. Authors included: Alan Milburn, Peter Mandelson, Jacqui Smith, Tessa Jowell, Andrew Adonis, Caroline Flint, Douglas Alexander, Frank Field, Liam Byrne, Ivan Lewis, Rachel Reeves, Tristram Hunt, Liz Kendall and Jenny Chapman. There were ideas such as foundation trusts providing GP services, a school voucher system, crime commissioners, directly elected mayors and 'hasbos'. The Labour Party leader at the time, Ed Miliband, wrote a foreword to the book.

Under the Progressive Britain name the organization published research on Labour's electoral strategy, business regulation, and the future of work. It publishes a regular current affairs and Labour Party centred blog.

== Links with Labour First ==
Historically, Progress had little connection with Labour First, an older Labour party factional organisation on the right of the Labour party. The rise of Jeremy Corbyn and Momentum in the Labour Party saw Progress and Labour First, while remaining distinct organisations with different traditions, carry out more joint activities, including joint endorsement of candidates in internal party elections.

During the 2020 Labour Party leadership election, Labour First formed a joint venture with Progress called Reclaiming Labour, holding meetings around the country analysing why Labour lost heavily in the 2019 general election.

In April 2020, immediately on the election of Keir Starmer as party leader, Labour First and Progress launched jointly a new umbrella organisation called Labour to Win, with goals including 'to bring about fundamental change in the party's culture and organisation'.

Labour to Win endorsed candidates in the 2020 Labour National Executive Committee elections, however owing to the newly adopted single transferable vote nature of the elections, and in the spirit of electing a pluralistic NEC, the organisation chose only to endorse six of its own candidates and also to endorse three candidates politically more to the left than Labour To Win but who had a commitment to broad church Labour politics.

In the 2024 election, Labour to Win backed 194 of the winning MP campaigns.

== Funding ==
Data from the Electoral Commission shows that between 2001 and August 2019, Progress received almost £4.7 million in donations. Of this £3.5 million came from Lord Sainsbury of Turville, who stopped funding Progress in 2017. Another source reported that Sainsbury had contributed £2 million of the £3 million of donations and sponsorship to Progress from 2001 to 2011. In 2014 Progress was fined £6,000 by the Electoral Commission for accepting donations of £390,000 from Sainsbury while he was not on a UK electoral register, between December 2011 and April 2013. During 2016 he had donated £260,000. Following the 2017 general election Sainsbury announced he would no longer provide financial backing to Progress.

The second largest donor to Progress during this period is listed by the Electoral Commission as a "Permissible Donor Exempt Trust" set up in the name of Lord Montague of Oxford, which made donations to Progress for two years following his death.

The British Private Equity and Venture Capital Association has given Progress £57,000.

It was reported in 2012 that Progress had received more money than both the Green Party and Plaid Cymru, and that it had received more than 122 times more funding than any other members' association within the Labour Party. This level of funding has led to accusations that Progress is operating as a "party within a party".

== Criticism ==
In 2012, Progress was at the centre of the debate over the direction of the Labour Party under Ed Miliband, after a widely circulated anonymous report called for Labour's national executive to "determine the organisational nature of Progress, and whether or not this form of organisation is acceptable inside the Labour Party." Criticism of Progress had concentrated on the generous funding that Progress had secured from external donors, and on its positioning, regarded as being on the right of the Labour Party. Following circulation of the report, the GMB General Secretary Paul Kenny led calls at the 2012 Labour conference for Progress to be "effectively… (outlawed)…as part of the Labour Party." In response, a Labour Party statement said, "We are a party that is reaching out to people, gaining new supporters and offering real change for the country in these tough times. The Labour Party is a broad church and we are not in the business of excluding people." Labour leader Ed Miliband was also clearly in support, telling The Independent that "I believe in an open and inclusive party, reaching out to people, not for pushing people away. That certainly does not mean excluding or proscribing organisations like Progress which contribute to the debate."

In 2013, Len McCluskey, general secretary of Unite the Union, claimed Progress was manipulating the selection procedures for Labour parliamentary candidates to get its candidates selected. Progress responded: "Progress helps to train and mentor candidates going for selection, to whom we do not give money. The details are open, plainly explained on our website and approved by a strategy board elected by our members."

== Personnel of Progress to 2020 ==
=== Chairs and board members ===
Progress was chaired by Alison McGovern in 2015. In 2014 its vice-chairs were the Labour MPs Jenny Chapman, Stephen Doughty, Julie Elliott, Tristram Hunt, Dan Jarvis, Liz Kendall, Seema Malhotra, Toby Perkins, Lucy Powell, Steve Reed, Jonathan Reynolds and Nick Smith.

Progress's honorary president was former Minister Stephen Twigg, previously the organization's chair.

Progress was constituted as a private company limited by guarantee, with a legal board of directors in 2012 consisting of Jennifer Gerber, Jonathan Mendelsohn, Robert Philpot and Stephen Twigg.

Prior to 2015 Progress was chaired by MP John Woodcock, and prior to 2014 by former Minister Lord Adonis. Prior to 2012 Progress was chaired by MP and former Minister Stephen Twigg, and the honorary president was Alan Milburn, the former Secretary of State for Health. Jonathan Mendelsohn was treasurer of Progress.

=== Strategy Board ===
Progress announced the creation of the first strategy board in July 2012, to enable the organisation's 'growing membership to feel a true sense of engagement'. The first elections were held in August 2012. The final elections were held in 2016 and after this, under the Progressive Britain name, the strategy board was discontinued.

The final members of the Progress strategy board in 2020 were:

- Alison McGovern MP (chair)
- Gloria De Piero
- Peter Mandelson
- Phil Wilson
- Rachael Saunders
- James Beckles
- Jonathan Hawkes
- Joanne Harding
- Rachael Saunders
- Christabel Cooper
- Sheila Gilmore
- John Hannett
- Mary Wimbury

== Directors of Progress ==
Since its inception Progress has had a number of operational directors:

- Derek Draper
- Darren Murphy (former Special Adviser)
- Patrick Diamond (former Special Adviser)
- Jennifer Gerber
- Jess Asato (acting director)
- Robert Philpot (retired October 2014)
- Richard Angell (2014–2018)
- Nathan Yeowell (August 2019 – October 2023)
- Adam Langleben (October 2023 – present)
