= Pendle and Clitheroe =

UK Parliament constituency (since 2024)

- Borough constituency for the House of Commons
- Interactive map of boundaries since 2024
- Location within North West England
- County: Lancashire
- Electorate: 76,941 (March 2020)
- Major settlements: Nelson, Colne, Clitheroe, Barnoldswick

Current constituency
- Created: 2024
- Member of Parliament: Jonathan Hinder (Labour)
- Seats: One
- Created from: Pendle, Ribble Valley

Pendle and Clitheroe is a constituency of the House of Commons in the UK Parliament. Further to the completion of the 2023 review of Westminster constituencies, it was contested for the first time at the 2024 general election, since when it has been represented by Jonathan Hinder of the Labour Party.

== Constituency profile ==
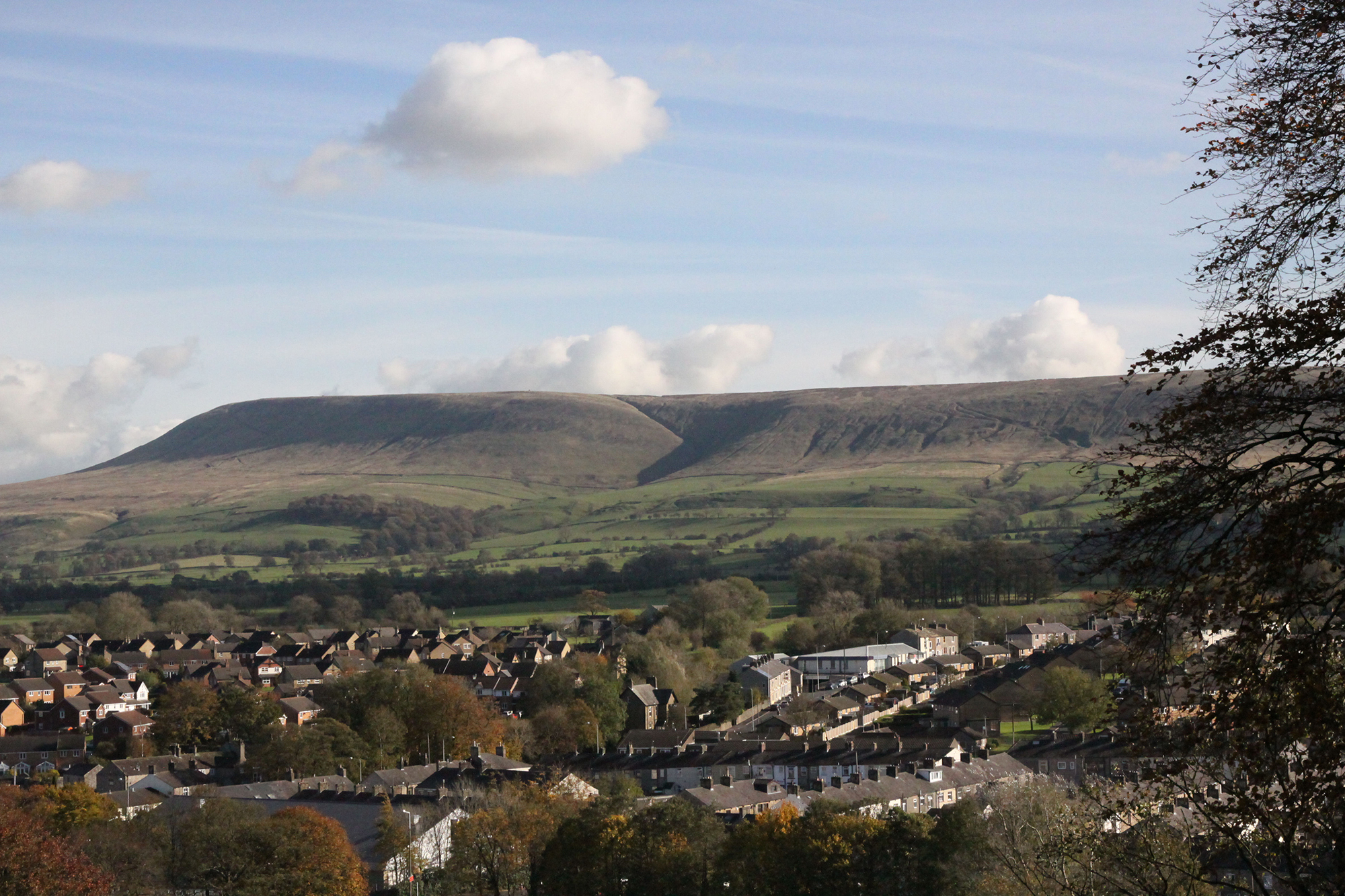
Clitheroe with Pendle Hill in the background

Pendle and Clitheroe is a constituency in Lancashire in North West England, covering most of the Borough of Pendle and part of the Ribble Valley district. Its largest town is Nelson, which has a population of around 36,000. Other settlements include the towns of Clitheroe, Colne, Barnoldswick and Earby and the villages of Barrowford and Whalley.

Pendle Hill, which forms part of the Forest of Bowland National Landscape, takes up much of the constituency's area and separates Clitheroe from the other main settlements. Clitheroe and its nearby villages are generally affluent and have been described as some of the best places to live in the country. Nelson and Colne form part of a conurbation linking them to the large town of Burnley; this area has an industrial heritage with a history of textile manufacturing and coal mining. These towns are highly-deprived and most residents live in dense, Victorian terraces built to house factory workers. House prices across the constituency are generally lower than the rest of North West England and considerably lower than the UK average.

Residents of Pendle and Clitheroe have a similar age profile to the rest of the country. They have below-average levels of income and average rates of homeownership. The child poverty rate is high. Residents have low levels of education and a high proportion work in the manufacturing and retail sectors. The percentage claiming unemployment benefits is higher than the overall UK rate. White people made up 81% of the population at the 2021 census. Asians, almost all of whom were of Pakistani origin, were 17% of residents. The Asian population are concentrated in Nelson, where they made up a majority of the population.

At the local council level, Nelson is represented by Labour Party and independent councillors, Colne elected Reform UK and Conservative representatives, and Clitheroe, Barnoldswick and Earby elected Liberal Democrats. Voters in Pendle and Clitheroe strongly supported leaving the European Union in the 2016 referendum; an estimated 62% voted in favour of Brexit compared to the UK-wide rate of 52%.

== Boundaries ==
Further to the 2023 boundary review, the composition of the constituency is as follows (as they existed on 1 December 2020):

- The Borough of Pendle wards of: Barnoldswick; Barrowford & Pendleside; Boulsworth & Foulridge; Bradley; Earby & Coates; Fence & Higham; Marsden & Southfield; Vivary Bridge; Waterside & Horsfield; Whitefield & Walverden.
- The Borough of Ribble Valley wards of: Chatburn; East Whalley, Read & Simonstone; Edisford & Low Moor; Littlemoor; Primrose; Sabden; St. Mary’s; Salthill; Whalley & Painter Wood; Wiswell & Barrow.

The seat replaced the former constituency of Pendle, excluding the community of Brierfield (transferred to Burnley), extending westwards across Pendle Hill into the Ribble Valley constituency to include the town of Clitheroe.

== Members of Parliament ==
Election	Member	Party
2024	Jonathan Hinder	Labour

== Elections ==
=== Elections in the 2020s ===
General election 2024: Pendle and Clitheroe
Party	Candidate	Votes	%	±%
Labour	Jonathan Hinder	16,129	34.5	+1.4
Conservative	Andrew Stephenson	15,227	32.6	−24.3
Reform	Victoria Fletcher	8,171	17.5	N/A
Independent	Zulfikar Khan	3,108	6.6	N/A
Liberal Democrats	Anna Fryer	2,039	4.4	−2.9
Green	Lex Kristan	1,421	3.0	+0.9
Workers Party	Syed Hashmi	336	0.7	N/A
Rejoin EU	Chris Thompson	190	0.4	N/A
Independent	Tony Johnson	133	0.3	N/A
Majority		902	1.9	N/A
Turnout		46,754	59.3	−3.7
Labour gain from Conservative		Swing	+12.9	
