= Soundings (journal) =

- Discipline: Politics and culture
- Language: English
- Edited by: Sally Davison; Ben Little

Publication details
- History: 1995–present
- Publisher: Lawrence and Wishart (United Kingdom)
- Frequency: Triannually

Standard abbreviations
- ISO 4: Soundings

Indexing
- ISSN: 1362-6620 (print); 1741-0797 (web)
- LCCN: 98646903
- OCLC no.: 55042921

Links
- Journal homepage; Recent archive; Ingentaconnect archive

Soundings is a triannual academic journal of leftist political thinking, which was established in 1995 and is published by Lawrence and Wishart. The current convening editor is Sally Davison. The current editorial collective is: Sally Davison, David Featherstone, Kirsten Forkert, Deborah Grayson, Hannah Hamad, Ben Little, Jo Littler, Marina Prentoulis, Michael Rustin, Alison Winch.

== History ==
Its founding editors-in-chief were Stuart Hall (Open University), Doreen Massey (Open University), and Michael Rustin (University of East London). Jonathan Rutherford was editor from 2004 to 2012.

Since 2008, Soundings has published a series of online books.
