= Adrian Pabst =

British religious and political scientist

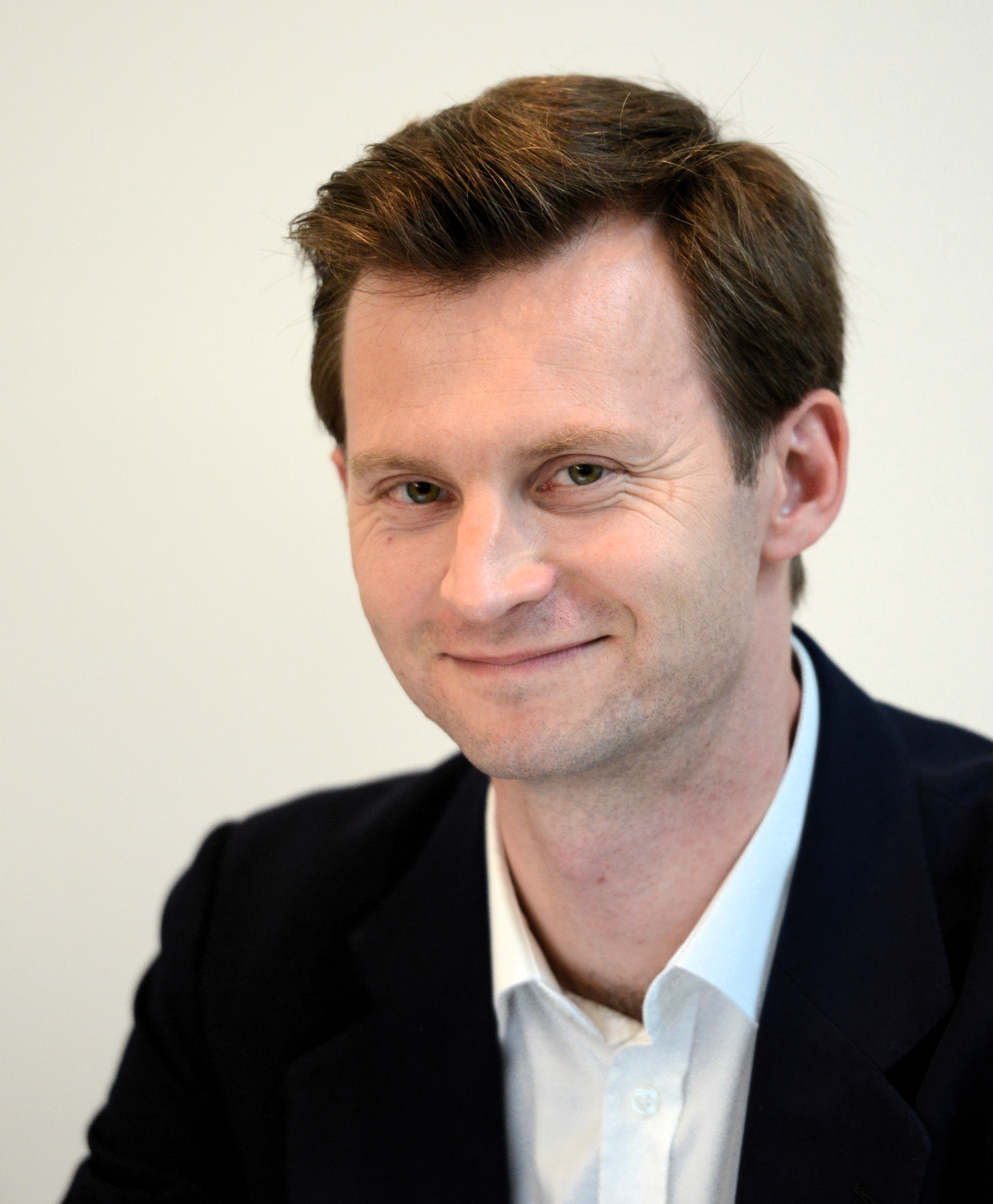
- Born: 1976 (age 49–50)

Adrian Pabst (born 1976) is a German religious scholar and political scientist who has published numerous books and essays on the role of ethics and religion in politics since 2009 as a professor at the University of Kent.

Pabst earned an MA in religious studies from the University of Cambridge, a Master of Science from the London School of Economics and a PhD in the history of political ideas and philosophy of religion from the University of Cambridge (2002–2006). He then conducted research at the University of Nottingham on a Leverhulme Early Career Fellowship (2007–09). In addition to German, he is fluent in English, French and Spanish.

In addition to his teaching and research work, Pabst frequently writes articles on geopolitics, political economy, Europe and religion in internationally renowned media such as the International Herald Tribune, The Guardian, The Moscow Times, The National, The Huffington Post, the Australian research portal The Conversation, ABC Rubrik Religion & Ethics and Les Échos.

Since 2007 he has been co-editor of the religious studies journal Telos and a member of the University of Nottingham Centre of Theology and Philosophy. In 2012 he joined the non-partisan think tank ResPublica.

His university states that the focus of his research is contemporary post-liberal politics and political economy.

== Books ==
- Radical orthodoxy pour une révolution théologique. Ad solem diff sofedis 2004
- Encounter between Eastern orthodoxy and radical orthodoxy transfiguring the world through the Word. Ashgate 2008
- The pope and Jesus of Nazareth : Christ, scripture and the Church. (mit Angus Paddison) SCM Press, Nottingham 2009
- The crisis of global capitalism : Pope Benedict XVI's social encyclical and the future of political economy, Essays. Wipf & Stock, 2011
- Metaphysics : the creation of hierarchy. W.B. Eerdmans, 2012.
- The Demons of Liberal Democracy. Polity Press, 160pp, 2019.
- Postliberal Politics: The Coming Era of Renewal (Polity, 2021)
- with Ian Geary, Adrian Pabst (Hrsg.): Blue Labour: Forging a New Politics, I.B. Tauris/Bloomsbury 2015, ISBN 9781784534912.
