= David Smith (British Labour politician) =

British politician

David Smith MP
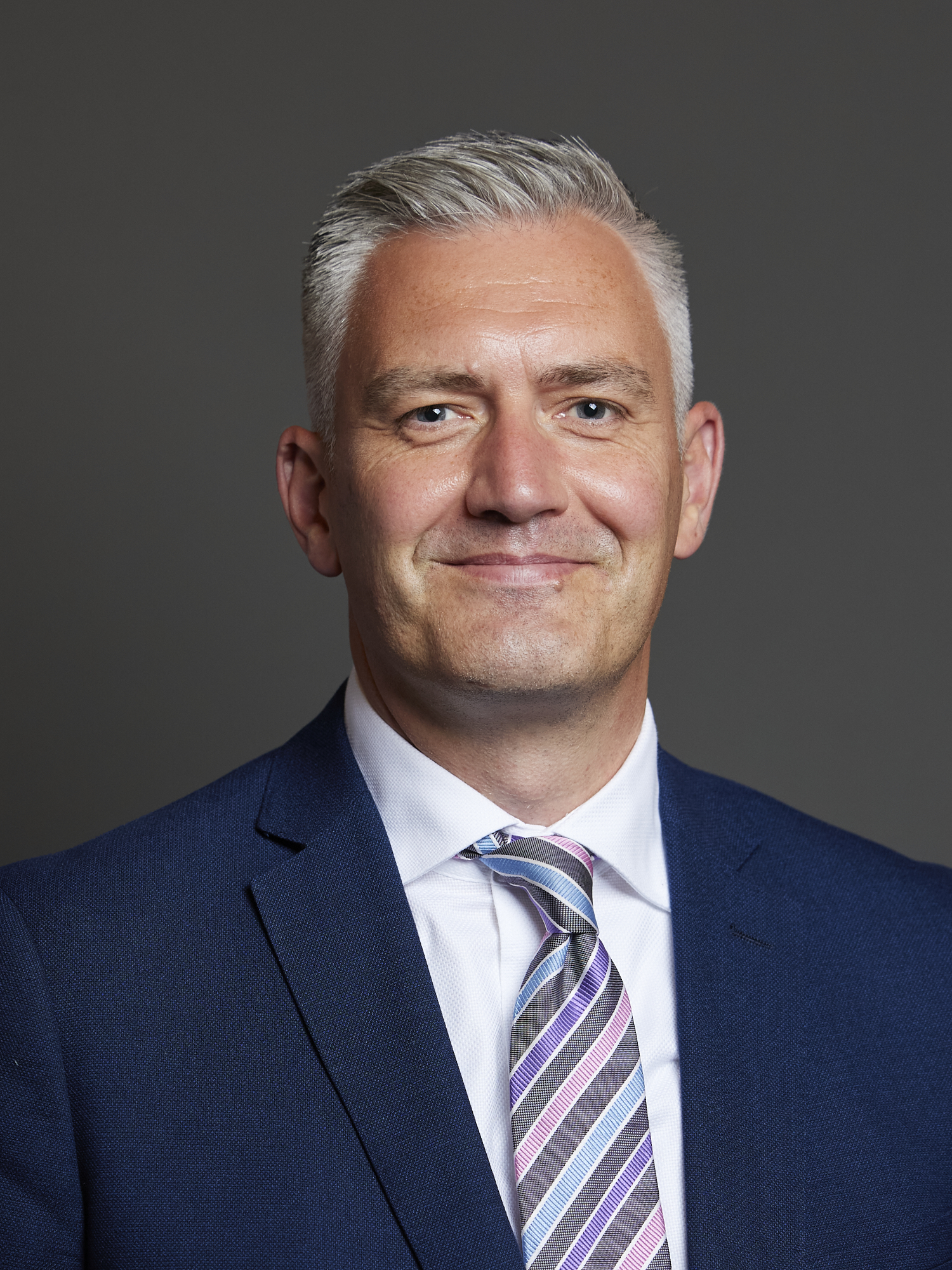
- Official portrait, 2024

UK's Special Envoy for Freedom of Religion or Belief
- Incumbent
- Assumed office 11 December 2024
- Prime Minister: Keir Starmer; Andy Burnham
- Preceded by: Fiona Bruce (as Prime Minister's Special Envoy for Freedom of Religion or Belief)

Member of Parliament for North Northumberland
- Incumbent
- Assumed office 4 July 2024
- Preceded by: Constituency established
- Majority: 5,067 (10.4%)

Personal details
- Party: Labour
- Other political affiliations: Blue Labour
- Education: Glasgow University (MA); University College Dublin (MPhil)

David William Smith is a British politician who has served as Member of Parliament (MP) for North Northumberland since 2024. A member of the Labour Party, he has been the UK's Special Envoy for Freedom of Religion or Belief (FoRB) since December 2024. He describes himself as belonging to the more socially conservative Blue Labour faction of the Parliamentary Party.

== Parliamentary career ==
In the 2024 United Kingdom general election, Smith was elected in North Northumberland unseating former cabinet minister Anne-Marie Trevelyan. It was the first time Labour had won that part of Northumberland.

In July 2024, Smith voted against a Scottish National Party amendment which called for the abolition of the two-child benefit cap. In September, he voted against an amendment condemning the government's proposed changes to the eligibility criteria for Winter Fuel Payments.

Smith confirmed in November that he would vote against Kim Leadbeater MP's private member's bill to legalise assisted dying. He argued that "We were given a 40-page bill three weeks ago, and we've got five hours next Friday to debate it. That's simply not enough time." Further, he argued that "The second reason is principle. That's about the fear of coercion. I've spoken to doctors who've said it's almost impossible to see coercion happening, even from loved ones. The worst thing for me is the pressure people might put on themselves, feeling they're a burden. For those reasons, I'll be voting against it."

On 11 December 2024, he was announced as the UK's Special Envoy for Freedom of Religion or Belief (FoRB), replacing former Conservative MP Fiona Bruce, who held the position as Prime Minister's Special Envoy for Freedom of Religion or Belief between December 2020 and July 2024.

In February 2025, Smith called on the Labour government to implement "meaningful tweaks" to their proposed changes to inheritance tax in order to protect British family farms from being financially penalised under the proposed changes. He also signed and supported a petition calling on British supermarkets to adopt a "fairer deal" for British farmers. He said that "Supermarkets are claiming to support UK farmers, but their actions suggest otherwise. Farmers and growers play a vital role in securing the UK’s food sustainability, but they aren’t receiving a fair deal from the supermarkets, whose punitive and misleading practices have been going on for years without challenge."

On 11 May 2026, Smith called on Keir Starmer to resign following the local elections.

== Personal life ==
David Smith grew up in the west of Scotland but has lived in Sunderland since 2007. He studied for degrees at both Glasgow University and University College Dublin.

Smith is a practising and professing Christian and previously worked at the Bible Society and Tearfund. Prior to the 2024 General Election, he led a housing charity in Gateshead ran by the Oasis Charitable Trust.
