= Martin Taylor (investor) =

British investor and hedge fund manager (born 1969)

Martin Taylor (born 1969/70) is a British investor and hedge fund manager. He has run several billion dollar funds, focusing on emerging markets. He is also a significant political donor to the Labour Party.

== Investment career ==
Born in London, his father was a Labour Party councillor at Lewisham London Borough Council and his mother was a headteacher of a London comprehensive. He attended King's College, Cambridge, and received a masters in history. He began work as an auditor for Coopers & Lybrand in 1991 and qualified as a chartered accountant three years later. He began auditing investment banks and learned about the profession by interviewing traders, reflecting on the time: "What both fascinated and appalled me was here were all these people just out of university, making hundreds of thousands of pounds, while I’m making £12,000, and I thought 99 percent of them were just plain stupid". He moved into investment in 1994, starting at Barings LLC initially as a financial analyst and then the manager of its Eastern Europe and Emerging Europe Trust funds. He made a significant move at Barings in 1997, moving substantially underweight Russian stocks in 1997 in anticipation of the 1998 Russian financial crisis, having noticed that Russian oligarchs were taking their money out of the country. Barings subsequently repurchased the Russian portfolio at a significant mark down, following the devaluation of the rouble and the Russian government's debt default.

He moved to Thames River Capital LLP in 2000, brought in by former Barings' colleague, Charlie Porter. It was there that he found his specialty, managing the newly launched Nevsky Fund, initially with Rory Landman and Eoghan Flanagan, and then with Nick Barnes, with a focus on identifying price inefficiencies. Management of the Fund was transferred to Nevsky Capital LLP, which Taylor ran as his own company from 2007 onwards. Under his management, the Nevsky fund achieved an average annual USD net return of 18.4% for its investors from the period 2000 to 2015, over double the average of other emerging market funds. He initially focused on companies in the former Soviet Bloc, investing in those deemed set to benefit from economic reforms as these economies democratized. His investments include Russian telecom companies such as Vimpelcom and assorted companies in the energy sector, including Gazprom and Lukoil. The Nevsky Fund then widened its investment remit after 2002 to all emerging markets, including Asia and Latin America, before then expanding the remit further after 2005 to also include all developed markets, such as the US and European Union. The Nevsky fund began as a $20 million Cayman Islands-based vehicle and was later relaunched in Dublin as a $800 million fund.

In 2010, Taylor and Barnes announced their intention to close the long only $3.3 billion Nevsky Global Emerging Markets and Asian funds, citing unsustainable working hours, but continued to manage the Nevsky Fund. Taylor's career was covered by Jack D. Schwager in his 2012 book Hedge Fund Market Wizards. Taylor closed the Nevsky fund of $1.5 billion at the end of 2015, saying that he was unable to match his past performance due to market conditions, and handed the fund's money back to its investors. Taylor returned to investment in 2019 with a $1.6 billion fund under Crake Asset Management LLP.

== Political donor ==
Taylor came to public attention outside of his investment activities in 2015 following research by the Bureau of Investigative Journalism to reveal his identity as a significant donor to the Labour Party. His common name had prevented his identification prior to that. Taylor made his first donation to the party in October 2012 and met its leader Ed Miliband in July 2013. Within three years Taylor had donated nearly £600,000 to the party. Commentators indicated the hypocrisy of Miliband for targeting the Conservative Party for relying on hedge fund donors, while at the same time receiving significant support from Taylor. Taylor addressed the concerns in an article for The Independent stating that he was UK-domiciled, paid all tax due, and gave his support for higher taxation of the wealthy including a mansion tax. Taylor scaled back his donations following the election of Jeremy Corbyn as leader in 2015 and funded MP Dan Jarvis in a leadership challenge to Corbyn in 2016. Taylor was a significant donor to Keir Starmer's successful campaign for the 2020 Labour Party leadership election, giving £95,000.
