= Jonathan Rutherford =

British academic

- Born: Jonathan Andrew Rutherford; 13 July 1956 (age 70)
- Political party: Labour Party
- Movement: Blue Labour

Academic work
- Discipline: Cultural studies
- Institutions: Middlesex University

Jonathan Andrew Rutherford (born 13 July 1956) is an academic who was formerly a professor of cultural studies at Middlesex University. Within English politics, Rutherford is associated with the Blue Labour school of thought within the Labour Party, and has been described as one of its "leading thinkers". He was the editor of Soundings from 2004 to 2012.

Between 2017 and 2020, Rutherford was a member of Labour Together, an organisation which sought to promote unity within the Labour Party and reconnect it with its working-class base.
