= Labour Party leadership of Ed Miliband =

Ed Miliband's tenure as Leader of the Labour Party

The Right Honourable Ed Miliband MP
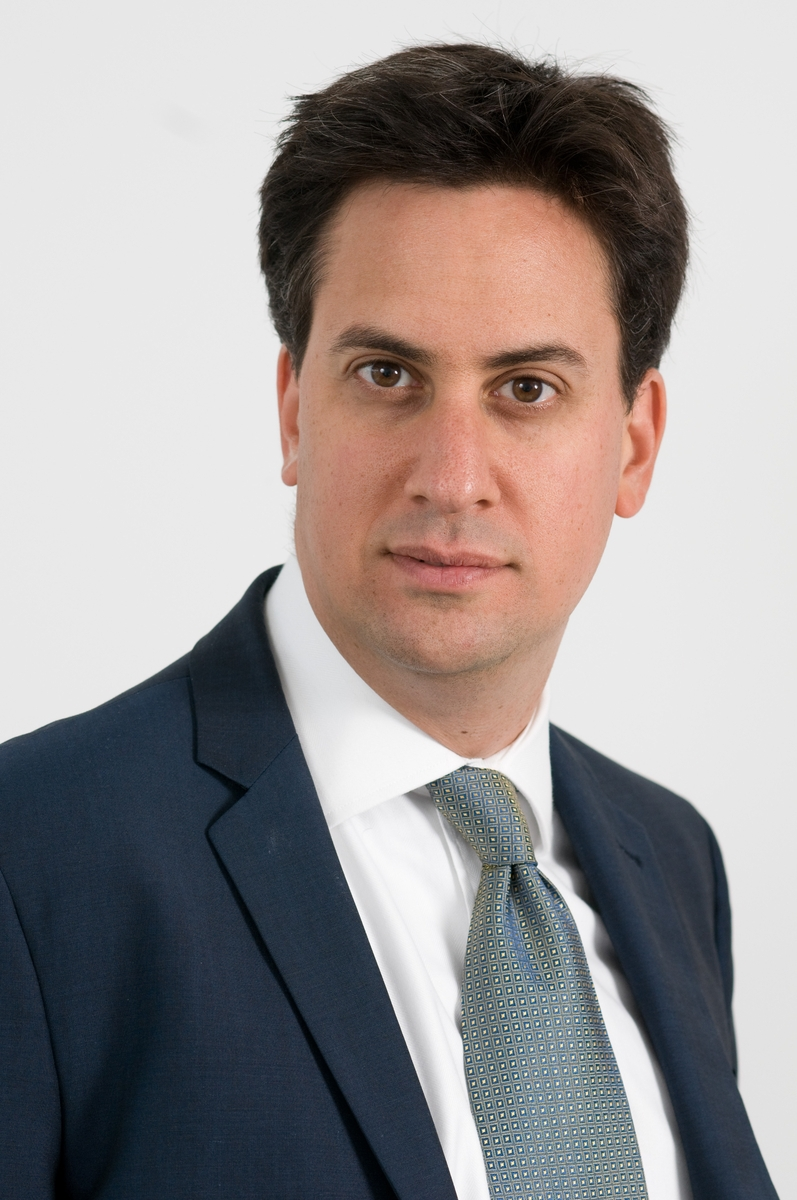

Leader of the Opposition
- In office 25 September 2010 – 8 May 2015
- Monarch: Elizabeth II
- Prime Minister: David Cameron
- Deputy: Harriet Harman
- Preceded by: Harriet Harman^{1}
- Succeeded by: Harriet Harman

Leader of the Labour Party
- In office 25 September 2010 – 8 May 2015
- Deputy: Harriet Harman
- Preceded by: Gordon Brown
- Succeeded by: Jeremy Corbyn

Ed Miliband was elected as Leader of the Opposition in September 2010, following the resignation of Gordon Brown after the formation of David Cameron and Nick Clegg's Conservative–Liberal Democrat coalition government in the aftermath of the 2010 general election.

Miliband's tenure as Leader of the Labour Party was characterised by a leftward shift in his party's policies under the "One Nation Labour" branding which replaced the New Labour branding, and by opposition to the Conservative–Liberal Democrat coalition government's cuts to the public sector. Miliband also abolished the electoral college system to elect the leader and deputy leader of the Labour Party, and replaced it with a "one member, one vote" system in 2014. He led his party into several elections, including the 2014 European Parliament election. Miliband appointed his first Shadow Cabinet in October 2010, following the Labour Party Shadow Cabinet elections. These elections were the last such elections before they were abolished in 2011. Miliband conducted two major reshuffles in 2011 and 2013, with a number of minor changes throughout his term.

Miliband was portrayed during Labour's 2015 general election campaign as being genuine in his desire to improve the lives of working people and to display progression from New Labour, but was unable to defeat interpretations of him as being ineffectual, or even cartoonish in nature. Various images circulated in the press and online media of Miliband performing day-to-day activities such as eating a bacon sandwich, donating money to a beggar, and giving a kiss to his wife, all while displaying apparently awkward facial expressions. Following Cameron's success in forming a majority Conservative government at the 2015 general election, Miliband resigned as leader on 8 May 2015. He was succeeded after a leadership election by Jeremy Corbyn.

== Labour leadership bid ==
Following the formation of the Conservative–Liberal Democrat coalition government on 11 May 2010, Gordon Brown resigned as Prime Minister of the United Kingdom and Leader of the Labour Party with immediate effect. Deputy Leader Harriet Harman took over as Acting Leader and became Leader of the Opposition. On 14 May, Ed Miliband announced that he would stand as a candidate in the forthcoming leadership election. He launched his campaign during a speech given at a Fabian Society conference and was nominated by 62 fellow Labour MPs. The other candidates were left-wing backbencher Diane Abbott, Shadow Education Secretary Ed Balls, Shadow Health Secretary Andy Burnham and Miliband's elder brother, Shadow Foreign Secretary David Miliband.

On 23 May, former Labour leader Neil Kinnock announced that he would endorse Miliband's campaign, saying that he had "the capacity to inspire people" and that he had "strong values and the ability to 'lift' people". Other senior Labour figures who backed the younger Miliband included Tony Benn and former deputy leaders Roy Hattersley and Margaret Beckett. By 9 June, the deadline for entry into the leadership election, Miliband had been nominated by just over 24% of the Parliamentary Labour Party, double the threshold. By September, Miliband had received the support of six trade unions, including both Unite and UNISON, 151 of 650 Constituency Labour Parties, three affiliated socialist societies, and half of Labour MEPs.

Miliband subsequently won the election, the result of which was announced on 25 September 2010, after second, third and fourth preferences votes were counted, achieving the support of 50.654% of the electoral college, defeating his brother by 1.3%. In the fourth and final stage of the redistribution of votes after three candidates had been eliminated, Ed Miliband led in the trade unions and affiliated organisations section of the electoral college (19.93% of the total to David's 13.40%), but in both the MPs and MEPs section (15.52% to 17.81%), and Constituency Labour Party section (15.20% to 18.14%), came second. In the final round, Ed Miliband won with a total of 175,519 votes to David's 147,220 votes.

== Leader of the Opposition ==
On becoming Leader of the Labour Party on 25 September 2010, Miliband also became Leader of the Opposition. At 40, he was the youngest leader of the party ever. At his first Prime Minister's Questions on 13 October 2010, he raised questions about the government's announced removal of a non-means tested child benefit. In December, he appointed Tom Baldwin as his director of communications.

During the 2011 military intervention in Libya, Miliband supported UK military action against Muammar Gaddafi. Miliband spoke at a large "March for the Alternative" rally held in London on 26 March 2011 to protest against cuts to public spending, though he was criticised by some for comparing it to the anti-apartheid and American civil rights movements.

A June 2011 poll result from Ipsos MORI put Labour 2 percentage points ahead of the Conservatives, but Miliband's personal rating was low, being rated as less popular than Iain Duncan Smith at a similar stage in his leadership. The same organisation's polling did find that Miliband's personal ratings in his first full year of leadership were better than David Cameron's during his first full year as Conservative leader in 2006.

In July 2011, following the revelation that the News of the World had paid private investigators to hack into the phones of Milly Dowler, as well as the families of murder victims and deceased servicemen, Miliband called for News International chief executive Rebekah Brooks to resign, urged Cameron to establish a public, judge-led inquiry into the scandal, and announced that he would force a Commons vote on whether to block the News International bid for a controlling stake in BSkyB. He also called for the Press Complaints Commission to be abolished – a call later echoed by Cameron and Nick Clegg – and called into question Cameron's judgement in hiring former News of the World editor Andy Coulson to be his director of communications. Cameron later took the unusual step of saying that the government would back Miliband's motion that the BSkyB bid be dropped, and an hour before Miliband's motion was due to be debated, News International announced that it would withdraw the bid.

Following the riots in England in August 2011, Miliband called for a public inquiry into the events, and insisted society had "to avoid simplistic answers". The call for an inquiry was rejected by David Cameron, prompting Miliband to say he would set up his own. In a BBC Radio 4 interview shortly after the riots, Miliband spoke of an irresponsibility that applied not only to the people involved in the riots, but "wherever we find it in our society. We've seen in the past few years...MPs' expenses, what happened in the banks". Miliband also said Labour did not do enough to tackle moral problems during its 13 years in office. In December 2011 Miliband appointed Tim Livesey, a former adviser to the Archbishop of Canterbury, to be his full-time chief of staff.

In his first speech of 2012, Miliband said that if Labour won the 2015 general election times would be difficult economically, but Labour was still the only party capable of delivering "fairness". He also said he would tackle "vested interests", citing energy and rail companies. Following the announcement in late January 2012 that the chief executive officer of the nationalised Royal Bank of Scotland, Stephen Hester, would receive a bonus worth £950,000, Miliband called the amount "disgraceful", and urged David Cameron to act to prevent the bonus. Cameron refused, saying it was a matter for the RBS board, leading Miliband to announce that Labour would force a Commons vote on whether or not the government should block it. Hester announced that he would forego his bonus, and Miliband said Labour would carry on with a Commons vote regardless, focusing instead on the bonuses of other RBS executives. Following George Galloway's unexpected win in the March by-election in Bradford West, Miliband announced he would lead an inquiry into the result, saying that it "could not be dismissed as a one-off".

In April 2012, in the midst of a debate about the nature of political party funding, Miliband called on Cameron to institute a £5,000 cap on donations from individuals and organisations to political parties, after it had been suggested that the government favoured a cap of £50,000. On 14 July 2012, Miliband became the first Leader of the Labour Party to attend and address the Durham Miners' Gala in 23 years. In the same month, Miliband became the first British politician to be invited to France to meet the new French President, François Hollande.

On 23 January 2013, Miliband stated that he was against holding a referendum on the UK's membership of the European Union because of the economic uncertainty that it would create. On 18 March 2013, Miliband reached a deal with both Cameron and Clegg on new press regulation laws following the Leveson Inquiry, which he said "satisfied the demands of protection for victims and freedom of the press". In August 2013, following the recall of parliament to discuss an alleged chemical attack in Syria, Miliband announced that Labour would oppose any military intervention on the basis that there was insufficient evidence. David Cameron had been in favour of such action but lost the ensuing vote, making it the first time that a British prime minister had been prevented from instigating military action by parliament since 1956.

At the Labour conference in September 2013, Miliband highlighted his party's stance on the NHS and announced if elected Labour would abolish the bedroom tax. The conference included several 'signature' policies, such as strengthening the minimum wage, freezing business rates, building 200,000 houses a year, lowering the voting age to 16, and the provision of childcare by primary schools between 8 am and 6 pm. The policy that attracted the most attention was the commitment to help tackle the 'cost-of-living crisis' by freezing gas and electricity prices until 2017 to give time to 'reset the market' in favour of consumers. In January 2014, Miliband extended the concept of reform to include the 'big five' banks, in addition to the 'big six' utility companies, and discussed the impact of the cost-of-living on the 'squeezed middle', saying "the current cost-of-living crisis is not just about people on tax credits, zero-hour contracts and the minimum wage. It is about the millions of middle-class families who never dreamt that life would be such a struggle".

Throughout 2014, Miliband changed Labour's policy on immigration, partly in response to UKIP's performance in the European and local elections in May, and the close result in the Heywood and Middleton by-election in October. Miliband committed to increase funding for border checks, tackle exploitation and the undercutting of wages, require employers who recruit abroad to create apprenticeships, and ensure workers in public-facing roles have minimum standards of English. In November 2014, Labour announced plans to require new EU migrants wait two years before claiming benefits.

Miliband campaigned in the Scottish independence referendum with the cross-party Better Together campaign, supporting Scotland's membership of the United Kingdom. Opinion polls showed solid leads for the 'no' campaign, with a 20 point-lead on 19 August. However, by the end of the month, the lead had fallen to just 6 points, with YouGov analysis showing a big shift in support among Labour supporters. Miliband made an unplanned visit to Lanarkshire to draw a contrast between a Labour and Conservative future for Scotland within the UK. A poll on 7 September showed a 2-point lead for the 'yes' campaign, leading to a joint commitment by Miliband, Cameron and Clegg for greater devolution to Scotland through a version of home rule. The results on 19 September showed victory for the 'no' campaign, 55.3% to 44.7%.

The day after the referendum, Cameron raised the issue of 'English votes for English laws', with Miliband criticising the move as a simplistic solution to a complex problem, eventually coming out in favour for a constitutional convention to be held after the general election.

The Labour party conference in Manchester on 21–24 September occurred days after the Scottish referendum result. Miliband's conference speech was criticised, particularly after he failed to deliver sections on the deficit and immigration, after attempting to deliver the speech without notes. At the conference, Miliband pledged to focus on six national goals for Britain until 2025, including boosting pay, apprenticeships and housing; a mansion tax and levy on tobacco companies to fund £2.5 billion a year 'time to care' fund for the NHS; a commitment to raise the minimum wage to £8 or more by 2020; and a promise to lower the voting age to 16 ready for elections in 2016.

In February 2015, Labour pledged to reverse the privatisation of the railways by getting rid of the franchising system, after previously saying that they would allow the public sector to bid for franchises.

=== Shadow Cabinet ===
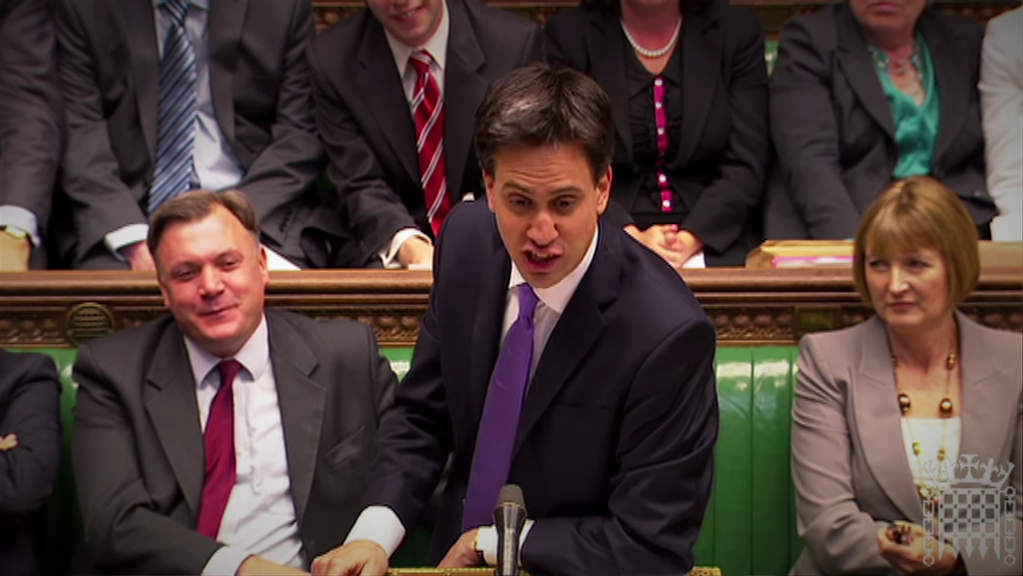
Miliband at Prime Minister's Questions circa 2012, flanked by Ed Balls and Harriet Harman

The first election to the Shadow Cabinet that took place under Miliband's leadership was on 7 October 2010. Ending days of speculation, David Miliband announced that he would not seek election to the Shadow Cabinet on 29 September, the day nominations closed, saying he wanted to avoid "constant comparison" with his brother Ed. The three other defeated candidates for the Labour leadership all stood in the election, though Diane Abbott failed to win enough votes to gain a place. Following the election, Miliband unveiled his Shadow Cabinet on 8 October 2010. Among others, he appointed Alan Johnson as Shadow Chancellor of the Exchequer, Yvette Cooper was chosen as Shadow Foreign Secretary, and both defeated Labour leadership candidates Ed Balls and Andy Burnham were given senior roles, becoming Shadow Home Secretary and Shadow Education Secretary respectively. Burnham was also given responsibility for overseeing Labour's election co-ordination.

Sadiq Khan, who managed Miliband's successful leadership campaign, was appointed Shadow Justice Secretary and Shadow Lord Chancellor, and continuing Deputy Leader Harriet Harman continued to shadow Deputy Prime Minister Nick Clegg, as well as being made Shadow International Development Secretary. Alan Johnson would later resign, stepping down for "personal reasons" on 20 January 2011, necessitating Miliband's first reshuffle, in which he made Balls Shadow Chancellor, Cooper Shadow Home Secretary and Douglas Alexander Shadow Foreign Secretary.

On 24 June 2011, it was reported that Miliband was seeking to change the decades-old rule that Labour's Shadow Cabinet would be elected every two years, instead wanting to adopt a system where he alone had the authority to select its members. Miliband later confirmed the story, claiming that the rule represented "a legacy of Labour's past in opposition". On 5 July, Labour MPs voted overwhelmingly by a margin of 196 to 41 to back the rule change, paving the way for NEC and conference approval, which was secured in September 2011. This made Miliband the first Labour leader to have the authority to pick his own Shadow Cabinet. ` On 7 October 2011, Miliband reshuffled his Shadow Cabinet. John Denham, John Healey and Shaun Woodward announced that they were stepping down, while Meg Hillier, Ann McKechin and Baroness Scotland also left the Shadow Cabinet. Veteran MPs Tom Watson, Jon Trickett, Stephen Twigg and Vernon Coaker were promoted to the Shadow Cabinet, as were several of the 2010 intake, including Chuka Umunna, Margaret Curran and Rachel Reeves, with Liz Kendall and Michael Dugher given the right to attend Shadow Cabinet. Lord Wood and Emily Thornberry were also made Shadow Cabinet attendees.

On 15 May 2012, Miliband appointed Owen Smith to replace Peter Hain – who retired from frontline politics – as Shadow Welsh Secretary, and also promoted Jon Cruddas to the Shadow Cabinet, putting him in charge of overseeing Labour's ongoing policy review with a view to draft Labour's manifesto for the next election. On 4 July 2013, Miliband effectively sacked Tom Watson from the Shadow Cabinet after allegations of corruption over the selection of a parliamentary candidate for Falkirk. Watson had offered his resignation, but when Miliband was asked by a journalist specifically whether he had sacked Watson, he replied, "...I said it was right for him to go, yes."

On 7 October 2013, Miliband reshuffled his Shadow Cabinet for the third time, saying that this would be the last reshuffle before the general election. In a move similar to his 2011 reshuffle, several MPs from the 2010 intake were promoted, while more long-serving MPs were moved. Tristram Hunt and Rachel Reeves received promotions, while Liam Byrne and Stephen Twigg were among those demoted.

Miliband conducted a final mini-reshuffle ahead of the 2015 general election in November 2014, when Jim Murphy resigned as Shadow International Development Secretary to become Leader of the Scottish Labour Party.

=== Local and European elections ===
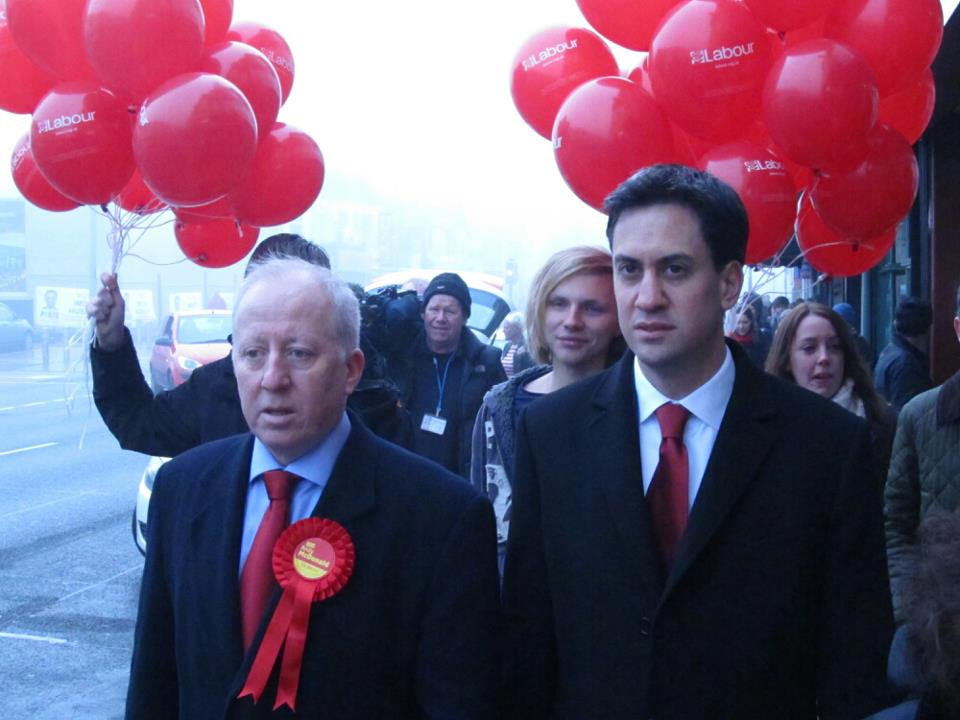
Andy McDonald and Ed Miliband in Middlesbrough, November 2012.

Miliband's first electoral tests as Labour leader came in the elections to the Scottish Parliament, Welsh Assembly and various councils across England, excluding London, on 5 May 2011. The results for Labour were described as a "mixed bag", with the party performing well in Wales – falling just one seat short of an overall majority and forming the next Welsh Government on its own – and making large gains from the Liberal Democrats in northern councils, including Sheffield, Leeds, Liverpool and Manchester.

Results were less encouraging in the south of England, and results in Scotland were described as a "disaster", with Labour losing nine seats to the SNP, which went on to gain the Parliament's first ever majority. Miliband said that following the poor showings in Scotland "lessons must still be learnt".

Miliband launched Labour's campaign for the 2012 local elections with a speech in Birmingham, accusing the coalition government of "betrayal", and claiming that it "lacked the values" that Britain needed. The Labour results were described as a success, with the party building on its performance the previous year in the north of England and Wales, consolidating its position in northern cities and winning control of places such as Cardiff and Swansea. Labour performed well in the Midlands and South of England, winning control of councils including Birmingham, Norwich, Plymouth and Southampton. Labour was less successful in Scotland than England and Wales, but retained control of Glasgow despite predictions it would not. Overall, Labour gained over 800 councillors and control of 22 councils.

In April 2013, Miliband pledged ahead of the upcoming county elections that Labour would change planning laws to give local authorities greater authority to decide what shops can open in their high streets. He also said that Labour would introduce more strenuous laws relating to pay-day lenders and betting shops. Labour subsequently gained nearly 300 councillors, as well as control of Nottinghamshire and Derbyshire County Councils.

In May 2014, Miliband led Labour through the European Parliament elections, where the party increased its number of Members of the European Parliament from 13 to 20. Labour came second with 24.4% of the vote, finishing ahead of the Conservatives but behind UKIP. This was the first time since the 1984 that the largest opposition party had failed to win the most seats in European elections. On the same day, Labour polled ahead of all other parties at the local elections, winning 31% of the vote and taking control of six additional councils.

=== 2015 general election and resignation ===
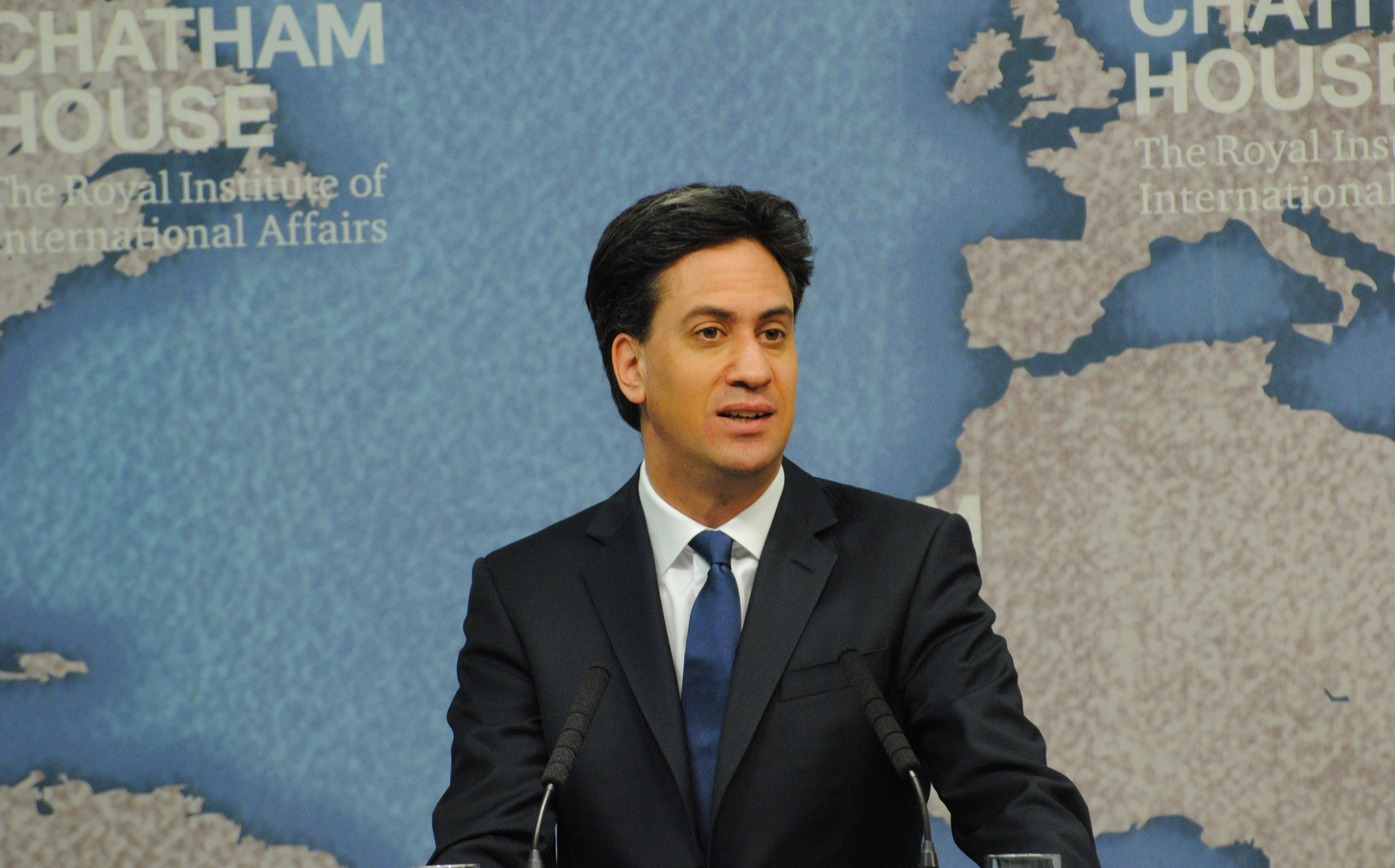
Miliband speaking on "Britain's Place in the World: A Labour Perspective" at Chatham House on 24 April 2015

On 30 March 2015, a general election was called for 7 May. Miliband began his campaign by launching a "manifesto for business", stating that only by voting Labour would the UK's position within the European Union be secure. Miliband subsequently unveiled five pledges at a rally in Birmingham which would form the focus of a future Labour government, specifically identifying policies on deficit reduction, living standards, the NHS, immigration controls and tuition fees. He included an additional pledge on housing and rent on 27 April. On 14 April, Labour launched its full manifesto, which Miliband said was fully funded and would require no additional borrowing. During this time an online campaign began known as Milifandom.

Throughout the campaign for the 7 May elections, Miliband insisted that Cameron should debate him one on one as part of a televised election broadcast in order to highlight differences in policies between the two major parties, but this was never to happen, with the pair instead being interviewed separately by Jeremy Paxman as part of the first major televised political broadcast of the election involving multiple parties.

Despite opinion polls leading up to the general election predicting a tight result, Labour decisively lost the 7 May general election to the Conservatives. Although gaining 22 seats, Labour lost all but one of its MPs in Scotland and ended up with a net loss of 26 seats, failing to win a number of key marginal seats that it had expected to win comfortably. After being returned as MP for Doncaster North, Miliband stated that it had been a "difficult and disappointing" night for Labour. Following David Cameron's success in forming a majority government, Miliband resigned as Leader of the Labour Party on 8 May, with Harriet Harman becoming acting leader while a leadership election was initiated. Jeremy Corbyn succeeded Miliband as leader.

== See also ==
- Premiership of Gordon Brown – Miliband's predecessor in the role
- Labour Party leadership of Jeremy Corbyn – Miliband's successor in the role
