= One Nation Labour =

Theme and branding of the British Labour Party adopted by the party in 2012

Logo of One Nation Labour

One Nation Labour refers to the theme and branding of the British Labour Party adopted by the party in 2012 under the leadership of Ed Miliband. Miliband described the "One Nation" term as being related to British Conservative Prime Minister Benjamin Disraeli's idea of One Nation conservatism. Disraeli claimed a need for government to reduce economic inequality, which he believed was splitting Britain into two nations of rich and poor people. Miliband stated that the theme of One Nation was shared by Labour Prime Minister Clement Attlee. Miliband has declared inspiration from Disraeli's and Attlee's One Nation theme, in that it challenges social barriers of class and promotes the unity of Britain.

One Nation Labour had been described by its proponents as the successor to New Labour. Miliband both commended and criticised elements of New Labour. He commended New Labour for challenging Old Labour's appeal to sectional interests by widening the party's appeal, but also criticised New Labour, saying that "although New Labour often started with the right intentions, over time it did not do enough to change the balance of power in this country", "New Labour was right to talk about rights and responsibilities but was too timid in enforcing them, especially at the top of society", and that "we have to move on from New Labour".

One Nation Labour was effectively replaced by a 'cost of living' narrative in 2013.

== Political philosophy ==
=== Economy ===
One Nation Labour supported an economy that rebalances society by rebalancing Britain's economy to: secure northern Britain's interests, help low- and middle-income earners, initiate long-term investment, and promote manufacturing.

It emphasised the need for promoting technical education for what is called "the forgotten 50 percent". Miliband claimed that long-term economic sustainability requires this, saying that university graduates should care just as much as those of the 50 percent because the country's economic future depends on those with mid-level skills.

=== Social justice ===
One Nation Labour declared the need to equalize life chances and for people to be able to lead valuable lives even in a financially unequal society.

Miliband said One Nation society cannot be one where CEO salaries boom while others' pay is stagnant, where corporations owned and operated in Britain do not pay taxes in Britain, and where those at the top of elite institutions believe that the rules do not apply to them. As such, Miliband said that while responsibility should apply to those using social security, that responsibility also matters at the top of society.

=== Culture and migration ===
One Nation Labour supported openness and tolerance to be a core of British identity and heritage while also declaring that immigration policy must be designed around the economic interests of the British people - and especially those at the bottom of the labour market. Miliband addressed the issue of emigration affecting Britain, with British people leaving Britain to search for opportunities elsewhere.

Miliband said "I am proud to celebrate the multi-ethnic, diverse nature of Britain", while also saying that the previous Labour government did not do enough to address the issue of migration saying that "high levels of migration were having huge effects on the lives of people in our country".

=== Devolution ===
One Nation Labour supported devolution of powers to a local government representing England like that done with Scotland and Wales under the previous Labour government. Miliband has said "If devolution to Scotland and Wales is right, so it must be right that the next Labour government devolves power to local government in England."

== Differences and similarities with New Labour ==
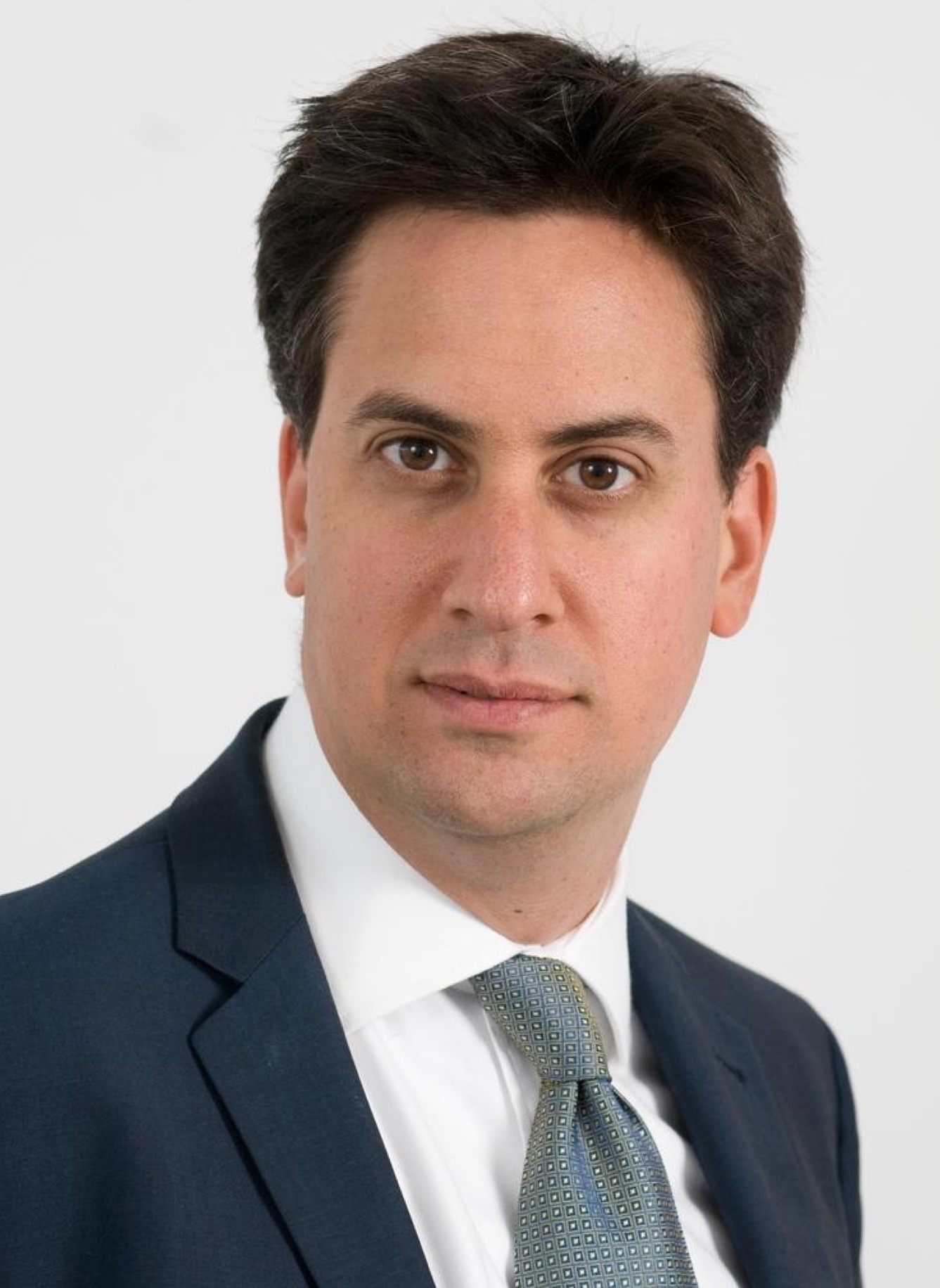
Ed Miliband, leader of the Labour Party during the One Nation era

=== Ideological ===
One Nation Labour challenged some of the Third Way policy developments created by New Labour while accepting and modifying others.

New Labour under Prime Minister Tony Blair sought to distance the Labour Party from the conventional definition of socialism. Blair said "My kind of socialism is a set of values based around notions of social justice ... Socialism as a rigid form of economic determinism has ended, and rightly". Blair referred to it as "social-ism" that involves politics that recognized individuals as socially interdependent, and advocated social justice, social cohesion, equal worth of each citizen, and equal opportunity. Third Way social democratic theorist and Labour Party member Anthony Giddens has said that the Third Way rejects the traditional conception of socialism, and instead accepts the conception of socialism as conceived of by Anthony Crosland as an ethical doctrine that views social democratic governments as having achieved a viable ethical socialism by removing the unjust elements of capitalism by providing social welfare and other policies, and that contemporary socialism has outgrown the Marxian claim for the need of the abolition of capitalism.

New Labour in practice however sought to avoid regular public use of the word "socialism" even in the Third Way definition, out of concerns that the word would remind the British electorate of the strongly left-wing political strategy of the Labour Party in the early 1980s.

Like New Labour, One Nation Labour endorsed Third Way capitalism and advocated a non-conventional definition of socialism, with Miliband declaring support for a form of "capitalism that works for the people" while declaring support for a "form of socialism, which is a fairer, more just, more equal society". Unlike New Labour, One Nation Labour used the term "socialism" more publicly.

== Critique and demise ==
University of Sheffield Professor of Political Economy Michael Jacobs, following the April 2013 Political Studies Association conference to examine the ideology and politics of One Nation Labour, commented that "One Nation Labour is already just a name for whatever the current Labour leadership thinks at the moment", though acknowledging it remained a work in progress whose success or failure he expected to be clear in under two years.

Dimitri Batrouni wrote in British Politics that "by mid to late 2013 Miliband switched to the 'cost of living' narrative, believing that the continuing wage squeeze was setting the economic agenda and such a switch would speak better to people's concerns". A Miliband senior aide identified the date of the switch as the policy announcement of the "energy price freeze" proposal in Miliband's 2013 Labour conference speech. It would have fitted within the One Nation narrative, but Miliband decided to frame it as a stand-alone policy.

Batrouni interviewed 30 leading Labour MPs, discovering confusion on the purpose of One Nation, writing:

Two distinct views can be discerned from the interviews with various actors in the PLP, particularly from the two principal centres for policymaking in the Labour party: the leadership and the Policy Review team. The first view was that One Nation represented a short-term tactical repositioning of the party. This view emphasised that One Nation was merely a slogan that aimed to 'steal the clothes of the Conservatives'. This was mainly held by the leadership team, especially the leader. The second view was that One Nation was a 'big idea' that could be used to construct a "policy narrative" to the public of the renewed purpose of the Labour party. This interpretation emphasised that One Nation conveyed a broader message and had the ability to combine a narrative or vision of a united society with concrete policies behind it. This view was primarily held by key members of the Policy Review team. These two competing interpretations created a generic view, mainly amongst the wider PLP, of confusion around the purpose of One Nation. This confusion resulted in many MPs not engaging with and eventually dismissing One Nation as a substantive idea.

Other Labour figures, such as Jon Cruddas and Blue Labour's Jonathan Rutherford continued discussing One Nation Labour, for example in the Cruddas September 2014 eBook "One Nation: Labour’s political renewal", but the narrative to the public was dead.
