= Ed Miliband bacon sandwich photograph =

2014 UK Labour Party leader photograph

This photograph of former Labour Party leader Ed Miliband eating a bacon sandwich became an Internet meme.

A photograph taken by photographer Jeremy Selwyn of Ed Miliband, then the leader of the Labour Party in the United Kingdom, eating a bacon sandwich became a source of sustained commentary and the subject of an internet meme in 2014 and 2015. Taken for the London Evening Standard while Miliband was campaigning in the 2014 local elections, the image became well-known following the popular perception of it as making Miliband appear awkward, error-prone, and incapable of performing simple tasks.

The image became a popular internet meme, and prompted a cultural debate about the lengths to which politicians attempt to control their public image. Keith Kahn-Harris of The Guardian regarded the focusing on the image, and its resulting Internet memes, as having been motivated by antisemitism (Miliband is a Jewish atheist). However, The Jewish Chronicle ran against this idea by saying many people had no idea Miliband was even Jewish and that it played into pre-existing British political jokes and culture, and that attempting to paint it as antisemitic will likely bring about severe backlash by bringing undue attention to discrimination where none existed. Miliband dismissed the debate as unimportant. Others described the media focus as unfair or as part of a wider negative personality-based media campaign. The photo was used in a mocking front page of The Sun, then the UK's most widely read newspaper, on the day before the 2015 general election. It is unclear what effect, if any, the photograph had on the eventual result.

== Photograph ==
The photograph was taken on 21 May 2014 by Jeremy Selwyn in London for the Evening Standard newspaper, during the first stop of Miliband's two-day campaign tour ahead of local and European elections. After arriving at New Covent Garden Market at 6:30 a.m. to promote his policies for small businesses, Miliband visited a café, where he ate the sandwich.

The Standard published the photographs as part of a gallery of 13 titled "Ed Miliband's Bacon Sandwich". It was accompanied by a story by political editor Joe Murphy, "Ed Miliband's battle with a bacon sandwich as he buys flowers for his wife at London market". Murphy's story began:

For a party leader anxious to avoid any more gaffes, what could go wrong buying flowers for the wife? Plenty, it turned out.... First came the delicate issue of his bacon roll, a vital accessory when meeting the working classes at breakfast time. Mr Miliband’s battle to consume the greasy treat alarmed his media minders, who tried to stop photographers taking close-ups of butter oozing between his teeth. After a few bites, the Labour leader appeared defeated, and the snack was put into the custody of Lord Wood, a senior shadow cabinet member.

Defending the photographs in December 2014, Selwyn said it was an unplanned shot, and that all politicians are "fair game" despite their press officers' strict controls on photography.

== Initial reactions ==
According to the tabloid newspaper The Daily Mirror writing two days after the event, the photograph of Miliband "struggling" to eat the bacon sandwich had immediately generated mockery and claimed it had made him "look a fool". In the ensuing week it became an Internet meme, with online users transposing it onto well-known images from history and popular culture, such as the Last Supper and When Harry Met Sally..., under the hashtag #EdEats. Publishing a selection of the parodies, The Daily Telegraph interpreted the incident as a backfired attempt by the Labour leader to look normal, claiming it was his awkward expression which sparked the parodies.

On 29 May 2014, Deputy Prime Minister and Liberal Democrat leader Nick Clegg was challenged by LBC host Nick Ferrari to eat a bacon sandwich live on air. Clegg expressed empathy with Miliband, saying:

I think this is very unfair because I don't think anyone looks very elegant... I guarantee you, if you were to eat the rest of it and I was to take thousands of pictures while you were doing it, I could manage to produce an unflattering [photograph] or two of you.

The Independent wrote on 21 May 2014 that "despite extensive stage-managing and with a seemingly simple task at hand, the Labour leader still struggled in his bid to look normal and back in touch with the general public", linking it to slip-ups which he had made in recent interviews.

== Subsequent references ==
Miliband reacted to the photograph on 25 July 2014 in a speech to party members, saying:

You could probably even find people who look better eating a bacon sandwich. If you want the politician from central casting, it's just not me, it's the other guy. If you want a politician who thinks that a good photo is the most important thing, then don't vote for me.

In October 2014, UK Independence Party leader Nigel Farage made headlines for eating a bacon sandwich while campaigning before the Heywood and Middleton by-election.

In November 2014, The Independent writer Boyd Tonkin linked the media narrative around the photograph to antisemitism, interpreting the coverage as a sign that "His clumsy aversion to pork products betrays him as an alien, a member of some foreign tribe", and inferring that the Daily Mail reporting that Farage ate his sandwich better was because "Nige is authentically one of us".

On 6 May 2015, Keith Kahn-Harris wrote in The Guardian "contemporary antisemitism is often strange and difficult to pin down, often disappearing into a miasma of claims and counter-claims. This is yet another example."

Writing on 13 March 2015 in The Guardian, Labour activist Owen Jones said the popularity of the photograph was part of a right-wing media campaign against Miliband, stating that "The media have a wider narrative about Ed Miliband: sad pathetic geeky loser who cannot even eat a bacon sandwich with any dignity. You can easily select photographs to make any politician look undignified, or generally reinforce whatever narrative you have selected". In April 2018, Jones referred to the incident as "antisemitic dog-whistles".

In April 2017, Miliband appeared on The Last Leg and was photographed with another bacon sandwich, while sitting on a motorbike in a leather jacket. The show's host, Adam Hills, said that this was because they needed "to create an alternative photo of Ed with a bacon sandwich and we need to get it trending [on Twitter]".

=== 2015 general election campaign ===
External image
- Front page of The Sun from 6 May 2015 from the tabloid's Twitter account.

Parliament dissolved on 30 March, marking the official start of the campaign period for the 2015 general election, with polling day being on 7 May.

On 7 April 2015, Prime Minister David Cameron ate a hot dog with a knife and fork. Although members of the public deemed him "posh" for doing this, The Independent offered the alternative suggestion that Cameron's campaign team were aiming for him to avoid looking like Miliband, which "may have been stage managed one step too far".

The day before polling day, the tabloid newspaper The Sun used the full photo on its front page, partially super-imposed with the headline "Save Our Bacon", with bylines reading "This is the pig's ear Ed made of a helpless sarnie. In 48 hours, he could be doing the same to Britain" above, and "Don't swallow his porkies and keep him out". This was interpreted by The Independent as a front page "entirely dedicated to mocking the Labour leader over the infamous incident." It sparked another Twitter trend in a show of support for the Labour leader, with users sharing photos of themselves eating bacon sandwiches and other food in a deliberately messy fashion, with the hashtag #JeSuisEd, in reference to Je Suis Charlie.

Cameron's Conservatives won the general election with an unexpected overall majority. Following Labour's defeat, Miliband resigned as leader. It is unclear what effect, if any, the photograph had on the eventual result.

=== 2017 general election campaign ===
During the 2017 general election campaign, a picture of Theresa May eating chips was compared to the photo of Miliband eating the sandwich, to which Miliband tweeted to May, "we should talk...".

== See also ==
- Barack Obama tan suit controversy
- Michael Dukakis § Tank photograph
- Piggate
- Please clap
