= Ed Miliband =

British politician (born 1969)

The Right Honourable Ed Miliband MP
- Official portrait, 2026

Foreign Secretary
- Incumbent
- Assumed office 20 July 2026
- Prime Minister: Andy Burnham
- Preceded by: Yvette Cooper

Leader of the Opposition
- In office 25 September 2010 – 8 May 2015
- Monarch: Elizabeth II
- Prime Minister: David Cameron
- Deputy: Harriet Harman
- Preceded by: Harriet Harman
- Succeeded by: Harriet Harman

Leader of the Labour Party
- In office 25 September 2010 – 8 May 2015
- Deputy: Harriet Harman
- Preceded by: Gordon Brown (Note: Harriet Harman acted from 11 May to 25 September 2010)
- Succeeded by: Jeremy Corbyn (Note: Harriet Harman acted from 8 May to 12 September 2015)
Further ministerial offices
Secretary of State for Energy Security and Net Zero (Note: Energy and Climate Change (2008–2010))
In office 5 July 2024 – 20 July 2026
| Prime Minister | Keir Starmer |
| Preceded by | Claire Coutinho |
| Succeeded by | Miatta Fahnbulleh |
In office 3 October 2008 – 11 May 2010
| Prime Minister | Gordon Brown |
| Preceded by | Office established |
| Succeeded by | Chris Huhne |
Minister for the Cabinet Office Chancellor of the Duchy of Lancaster
In office 28 June 2007 – 3 October 2008
| Prime Minister | Gordon Brown |
| Preceded by | Hilary Armstrong |
| Succeeded by | Liam Byrne |
Minister for the Third Sector
In office 6 May 2006 – 28 June 2007
| Prime Minister | Tony Blair |
| Preceded by | Phil Woolas |
| Succeeded by | Phil Hope |
Shadow Cabinet posts
Shadow Secretary of State for Energy Security and Net Zero (Note: Energy and Climate Change (11 May 2010 to 8 October 2010); Climate Change and Net Zero (29 November 2021 to 4 September 2023).)
In office 29 November 2021 – 5 July 2024
| Leader | Keir Starmer |
| Preceded by | Barry Gardiner (Note: As Shadow Secretary of State for Energy and Climate Change. Office vacant between 14 July 2016 and 29 November 2021.) |
| Succeeded by | Claire Coutinho |
In office 11 May 2010 – 8 October 2010
| Leader | Harriet Harman (acting); Himself |
| Preceded by | Greg Clark |
| Succeeded by | Meg Hillier |
Shadow Secretary of State for Business, Energy and Industrial Strategy
In office 6 April 2020 – 29 November 2021
| Leader | Keir Starmer |
| Preceded by | Rebecca Long-Bailey |
| Succeeded by | Jonathan Reynolds |

Member of Parliament for Doncaster North
- Incumbent
- Assumed office 5 May 2005
- Preceded by: Kevin Hughes
- Majority: 9,126 (29.4%)

Personal details
- Born: Edward Samuel Miliband; 24 December 1969 (age 56) Fitzrovia, London, England
- Party: Labour
- Spouse: Justine Thornton (m. 2011)
- Children: 2
- Parents: Ralph Miliband; Marion Kozak
- Relatives: David Miliband (brother)
- Education: Corpus Christi College, Oxford (BA); London School of Economics (MSc)
- Website: edmiliband.org.uk
- Miliband's voice from the BBC programme Desert Island Discs, 24 November 2013

Edward Samuel Miliband (born 24 December 1969) is a British politician who has served as Foreign Secretary since July 2026. He previously served as Energy Secretary from 2008 to 2010 under Gordon Brown and from 2024 to 2026 under Keir Starmer. He has been the Member of Parliament (MP) for Doncaster North since 2005. Miliband was Leader of the Labour Party and Leader of the Opposition from 2010 to 2015.

Miliband was born in the Fitzrovia district of Central London to Marion Kozak and Ralph Miliband, Polish Jewish immigrants. His father was a Marxist intellectual and native of Brussels who fled Belgium during the Second World War. He graduated from Corpus Christi College, Oxford and later from the London School of Economics. Miliband became first a television journalist, then a Labour Party researcher and a visiting scholar at Harvard University, before rising to become one of Chancellor Gordon Brown's confidants and chairman of HM Treasury's Council of Economic Advisers. He was elected to the House of Commons in 2005 and Prime Minister Tony Blair made him Minister for the Third Sector in May 2006. When Brown became Prime Minister in 2007, he appointed Miliband to his Cabinet as Minister for the Cabinet Office and Chancellor of the Duchy of Lancaster, with Miliband serving alongside his brother, David Miliband, who was Foreign Secretary. Miliband was subsequently promoted to the new post of Secretary of State for Energy and Climate Change, a position he held from 2008 to 2010.

After the Labour Party was defeated at the 2010 general election, Brown resigned as Leader of the Labour Party; in September 2010, Miliband was elected to replace him. His tenure as Labour leader was characterised by a leftward shift in his party's policies under the "One Nation Labour" branding, and by opposition to the Conservative–Liberal Democrat coalition government's cuts to the public sector. Miliband also abolished the electoral college system to elect the leader and deputy leader of the Labour Party, and replaced it with a "one member, one vote" system in 2014. He led his party into several elections, including the 2014 European Parliament election.

Following Labour's defeat by the Conservative Party at the 2015 general election, Miliband resigned as leader on 8 May 2015. He was succeeded following a leadership election by Jeremy Corbyn, and returned to the backbenches. In 2020, Keir Starmer appointed Miliband Shadow Secretary of State for Business, Energy and Industrial Strategy, and later Shadow Secretary of State for Climate Change and Net Zero in 2021. After Labour's victory in the 2024 general election, Miliband returned to government after being appointed Secretary of State for Energy Security and Net Zero by Starmer. Following Starmer's resignation, Miliband was promoted to the role of Foreign Secretary under Andy Burnham.

== Early life and education ==
Edward Samuel Miliband was born on 24 December 1969 in University College Hospital in Fitzrovia, London. He is the son of immigrant parents, Belgian-born Marxist sociologist Ralph Miliband and Polish-born Marion Kozak, both from Polish Jewish families. His mother, a human rights campaigner and early CND member, survived the Holocaust thanks to being protected by Catholic Poles, but her father, Ed's maternal grandfather, did not. His father Ralph was a Marxist academic whose father fled with him to England during the Second World War. The family lived on Edis Street in Primrose Hill, London. His elder brother, David Miliband, still owns the house as of 2010.

Ralph Miliband left his academic post at the London School of Economics in 1972 to take up a chair at the University of Leeds as a professor of politics. His family moved to Leeds with him in 1973; Miliband attended Featherbank Infant School in Horsforth between 1974 and 1977, during which time he became a fan of Leeds United.

Owing to his father's later employment as a roving teacher, Miliband spent two spells living in Boston, Massachusetts, United States, one year when he was seven and one middle school term when he was twelve. Miliband remembered his time in the US as some of his happiest, during which he became a fan of American culture, watching Dallas and following the Boston Red Sox and the New England Patriots.

Between 1978 and 1981, Ed Miliband attended Primrose Hill Primary School, near Primrose Hill in Camden, and then from 1981 to 1989 at Haverstock Comprehensive School in Chalk Farm. He learned to play the violin while at school, and as a teenager he reviewed films and plays on LBC Radio's Young London programme as one of its fortnightly "Three O'Clock Reviewers". After completing his O-levels, he worked as an intern to family friend Tony Benn, the MP for Chesterfield.

In 1989, Miliband gained four A Levels—in Mathematics (A), English (A), Further Mathematics (B) and Physics (B)—and then read Philosophy, Politics and Economics at Corpus Christi College, Oxford. In his first year, he was elected JCR President, leading a student campaign against a rise in rent charges. In his second year he dropped philosophy and was awarded an upper-second-class Bachelor of Arts degree. He went on to graduate from the London School of Economics as a Master of Science in Economics.

== Early political career ==
=== Special adviser ===
In 1992, after graduating from the University of Oxford, Miliband began his working career in the media as a researcher to co-presenter Andrew Rawnsley in the Channel 4 show A Week in Politics. In 1993, Shadow Chief Secretary to the Treasury Harriet Harman approached Rawnsley to recruit Miliband as her policy researcher and speechwriter. At the time, Yvette Cooper also worked for Harman as part of Labour's Shadow Treasury team.

In 1994, when Harriet Harman was moved by the newly elected Labour Leader Tony Blair to become Shadow Secretary of State for Employment, Miliband stayed on in the Shadow Treasury team and was promoted to work for Shadow Chancellor Gordon Brown. In 1995, with encouragement from Gordon Brown, Miliband took time out from his job to study at the London School of Economics, where he obtained a master's degree in economics. Following Labour's 1997 landslide victory, Miliband was appointed as a special adviser to Chancellor Gordon Brown from 1997 to 2002.

=== Harvard ===
On 25 July 2002, it was announced that Miliband would take a 12-month unpaid sabbatical from HM Treasury to be a visiting scholar at the Center for European Studies of Harvard University for two semesters. He spent his time at Harvard teaching economics, and stayed there after September 2003 for an additional semester teaching a course titled "What's Left? The Politics of Social Justice". During this time, he was granted "access" to Senator John Kerry and reported to Brown on the presidential hopeful's progress. After Miliband returned to the UK in January 2004 Gordon Brown appointed him Chairman of HM Treasury's Council of Economic Advisers as a replacement for Ed Balls, with specific responsibility for directing the UK's long-term economic planning.

== Early parliamentary career (2005–2010) ==
In early 2005, Miliband resigned his advisory role to HM Treasury to stand for election. Kevin Hughes, then the Labour MP for Doncaster North, announced in February of that year that he would be standing down at the next election due to being diagnosed with motor neurone disease. Miliband applied for selection to be the candidate in the safe Labour seat and won, beating off a close challenge from Michael Dugher, then a SPAD to Defence Secretary Geoff Hoon.

Gordon Brown visited Doncaster North during the general election campaign to support his former adviser. Miliband was elected on 5 May 2005, with 55.5% of the vote and a majority of 12,656. He made his maiden speech in the House of Commons on 23 May, responding to comments made by future Speaker John Bercow. In Blair's frontbench reshuffle in May 2006, he was made Minister for the Third Sector, with responsibility for voluntary and charity organisations.

=== Cabinet ===
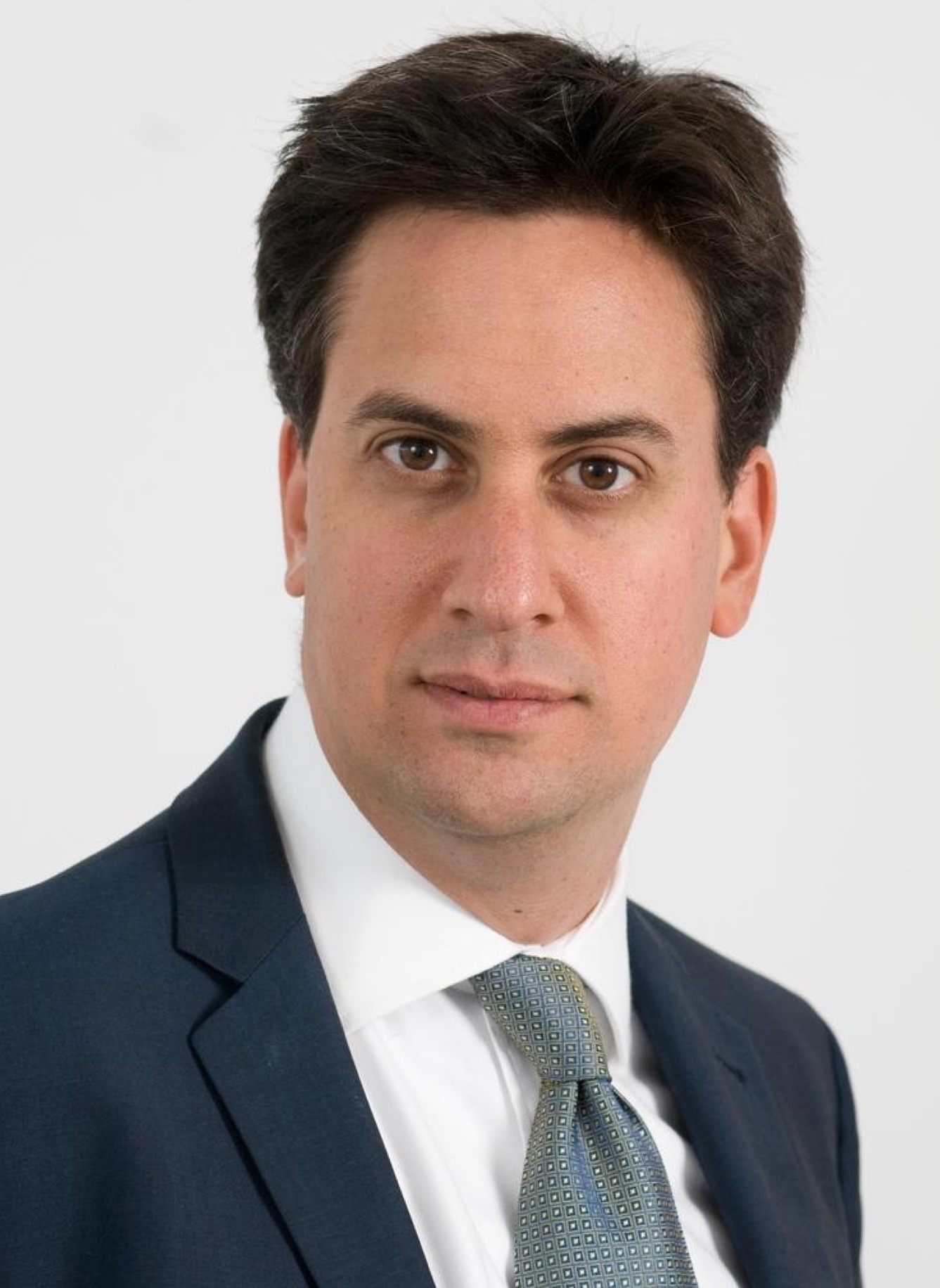
Official portrait, 2009

On 28 June 2007, the day after Brown became Prime Minister, Miliband was sworn of the Privy Council and appointed Minister for the Cabinet Office and Chancellor of the Duchy of Lancaster, being promoted to the cabinet. This meant that he and his brother, Foreign Secretary David Miliband, became the first brothers to serve in a British cabinet since Edward and Oliver Stanley in 1938. He was additionally given the task of drafting Labour's manifesto for the 2010 general election.

On 3 October 2008, Miliband was promoted to become Secretary of State for the newly created Department of Energy and Climate Change in a cabinet reshuffle. On 16 October, Miliband announced that the British government would legislate to oblige itself to cut greenhouse emissions by 80% by 2050, rather than the 60% cut in carbon dioxide emissions previously announced.

In March 2009, while Secretary of State for Energy and Climate Change, Miliband attended the UK premiere of climate change film The Age of Stupid, where he was ambushed by actor Pete Postlethwaite, who threatened to return his OBE and vote for any party other than Labour if the Kingsnorth coal-fired power station were to be given the go-ahead by the government. A month later, Miliband announced to the House of Commons a change to the government's policy on coal-fired power stations, saying that any potential new coal-fired power stations would be unable to receive government consent unless they could demonstrate that they would be able to effectively capture and bury 25% of the emissions they produce immediately, with a view to seeing that rise to 100% of emissions by 2025. This, a government source told the Guardian, effectively represented "a complete rewrite of UK energy policy for the future".

Miliband represented the UK at the 2009 Copenhagen Summit, from which emerged a global commitment to provide an additional US$10 billion a year to fight the effects of climate change, with an additional $100 billion a year provided by 2020. The conference was not able to achieve a legally binding agreement. Miliband accused China of deliberately foiling attempts at a binding agreement; China explicitly denied this, accusing British politicians of engaging in a "political scheme".

During the 2009 parliamentary expenses scandal, Miliband was named by the Daily Telegraph as one of the "saints" of the scandal, due to his claiming one of the lowest amounts of expenses in the House of Commons and submitting no claims that later had to be paid back.

== Leadership of the Labour Party (2010–2015) ==
=== Leadership election ===
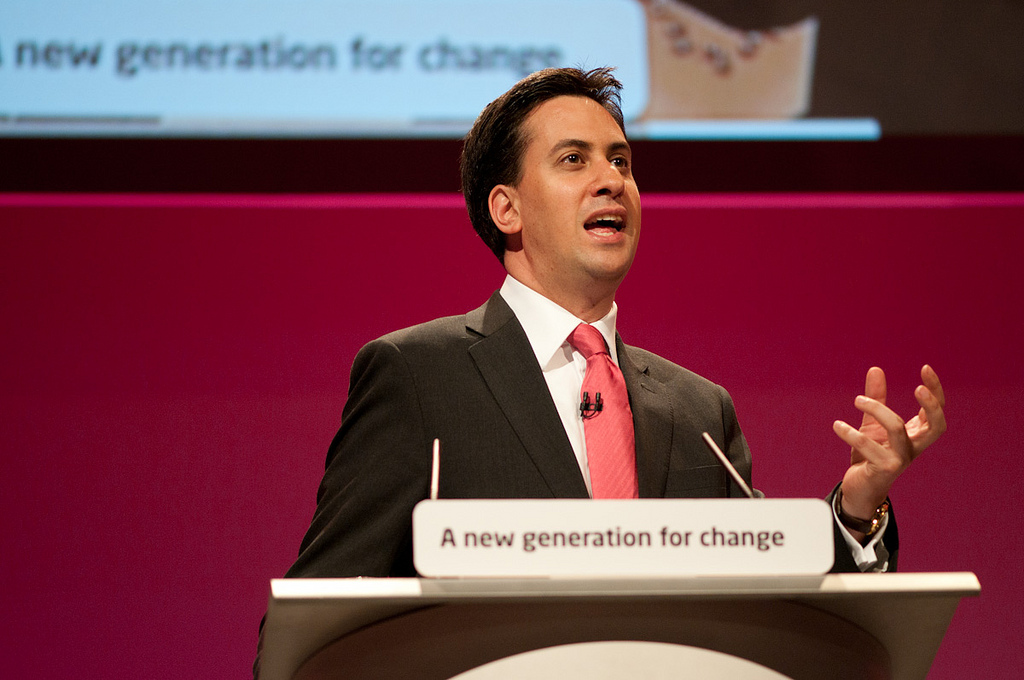
Miliband at party conference, 2010

Following the formation of the Conservative–Liberal Democrat coalition government on 11 May 2010, Gordon Brown resigned as Prime Minister of the United Kingdom and Leader of the Labour Party with immediate effect. Deputy Leader Harriet Harman took over as Acting Leader and became Leader of the Opposition. On 14 May, Miliband announced that he would stand as a candidate in the forthcoming leadership election. He launched his campaign during a speech given at a Fabian Society conference and was nominated by 62 fellow Labour MPs. The other candidates were left-wing backbencher Diane Abbott, Shadow Education Secretary Ed Balls, Shadow Health Secretary Andy Burnham and Miliband's elder brother, Shadow Foreign Secretary David Miliband.

On 23 May, former Labour leader Neil Kinnock announced that he would endorse Ed Miliband's campaign, saying that he had "the capacity to inspire people" and that he had "strong values and the ability to 'lift' people". Other senior Labour figures who backed the younger Miliband included Tony Benn and former deputy leaders Roy Hattersley and Margaret Beckett. By 9 June, the deadline for entry into the leadership election, Miliband had been nominated by just over 24% of the Parliamentary Labour Party, double the threshold; then on 10 June, Miliband stated in an interview, that "the era of Blair and Brown is over". By September, Miliband had received the support of six trade unions, including both Unite and UNISON, 151 of 650 Constituency Labour Parties, three affiliated socialist societies, and half of Labour MEPs.

Miliband subsequently won the election, the result of which was announced on 25 September 2010, after second, third and fourth preferences votes were counted, achieving the support of 50.654% of the electoral college, defeating his brother by 1.3%. In the fourth and final stage of the redistribution of votes after three candidates had been eliminated, Ed Miliband led in the trade unions and affiliated organisations section of the electoral college (19.93% of the total to David's 13.40%), but in both the MPs and MEPs section (15.52% to 17.81%), and Constituency Labour Party section (15.20% to 18.14%), came second. In the final round, Ed Miliband won with a total of 175,519 votes to David's 147,220 votes.

=== Leader of the Opposition ===
Miliband's tenure as Labour leader was characterised by a leftward shift in his party's policies under the One Nation Labour branding which replaced the New Labour branding, and by opposition to the Conservative–Liberal Democrat coalition government's cuts to the public sector. Miliband also abolished the electoral college system to elect the leader and deputy leader of the Labour Party, and replaced it with a "one member, one vote" system in 2014.

=== Shadow Cabinet ===
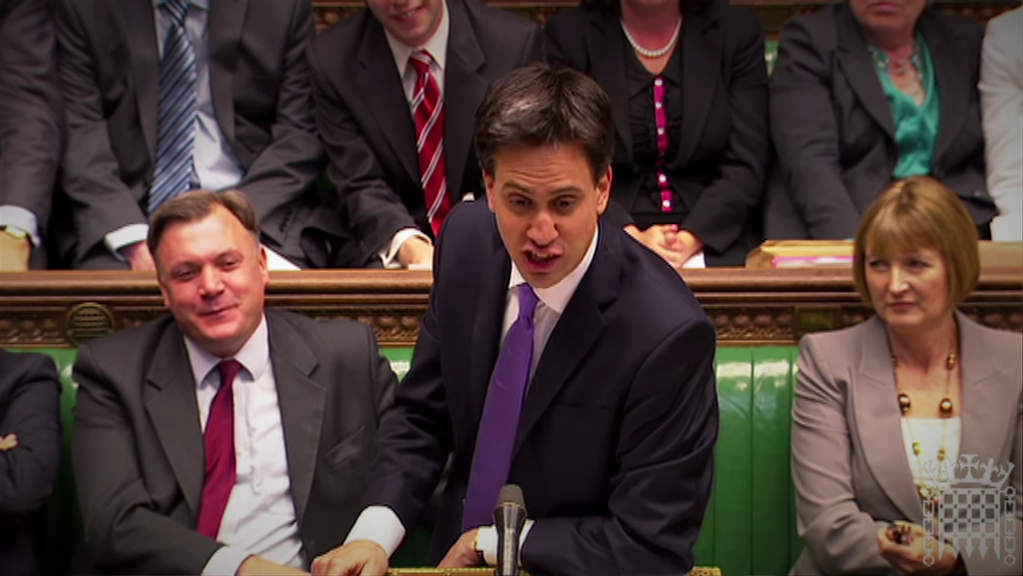
Miliband at PMQs with Ed Balls and Harriet Harman, 2012

The first election to the Shadow Cabinet that took place under Miliband's leadership was on 7 October 2010. Ending days of speculation, David Miliband announced that he would not seek election to the Shadow Cabinet on 29 September, the day nominations closed, saying he wanted to avoid "constant comparison" with his brother Ed. The three other defeated candidates for the Labour leadership all stood in the election, though Diane Abbott failed to win enough votes to gain a place.

Following the election, Miliband unveiled his Shadow Cabinet on 8 October 2010. Among others, he appointed Alan Johnson as Shadow Chancellor of the Exchequer, Yvette Cooper was chosen as Shadow Foreign Secretary, and both defeated Labour leadership candidates Ed Balls and Andy Burnham were given senior roles, becoming Shadow Home Secretary and Shadow Education Secretary respectively. Burnham was also given responsibility for overseeing Labour's election co-ordination.

Sadiq Khan, who managed Miliband's successful leadership campaign, was appointed Shadow Justice Secretary and Shadow Lord Chancellor, and continuing Deputy Leader Harriet Harman continued to shadow Deputy Prime Minister Nick Clegg, as well as being made Shadow International Development Secretary. Alan Johnson would later resign, stepping down for "personal reasons" on 20 January 2011, necessitating Miliband's first reshuffle, in which he made Balls Shadow Chancellor, Cooper Shadow Home Secretary and Douglas Alexander Shadow Foreign Secretary.

=== Election results and resignation ===
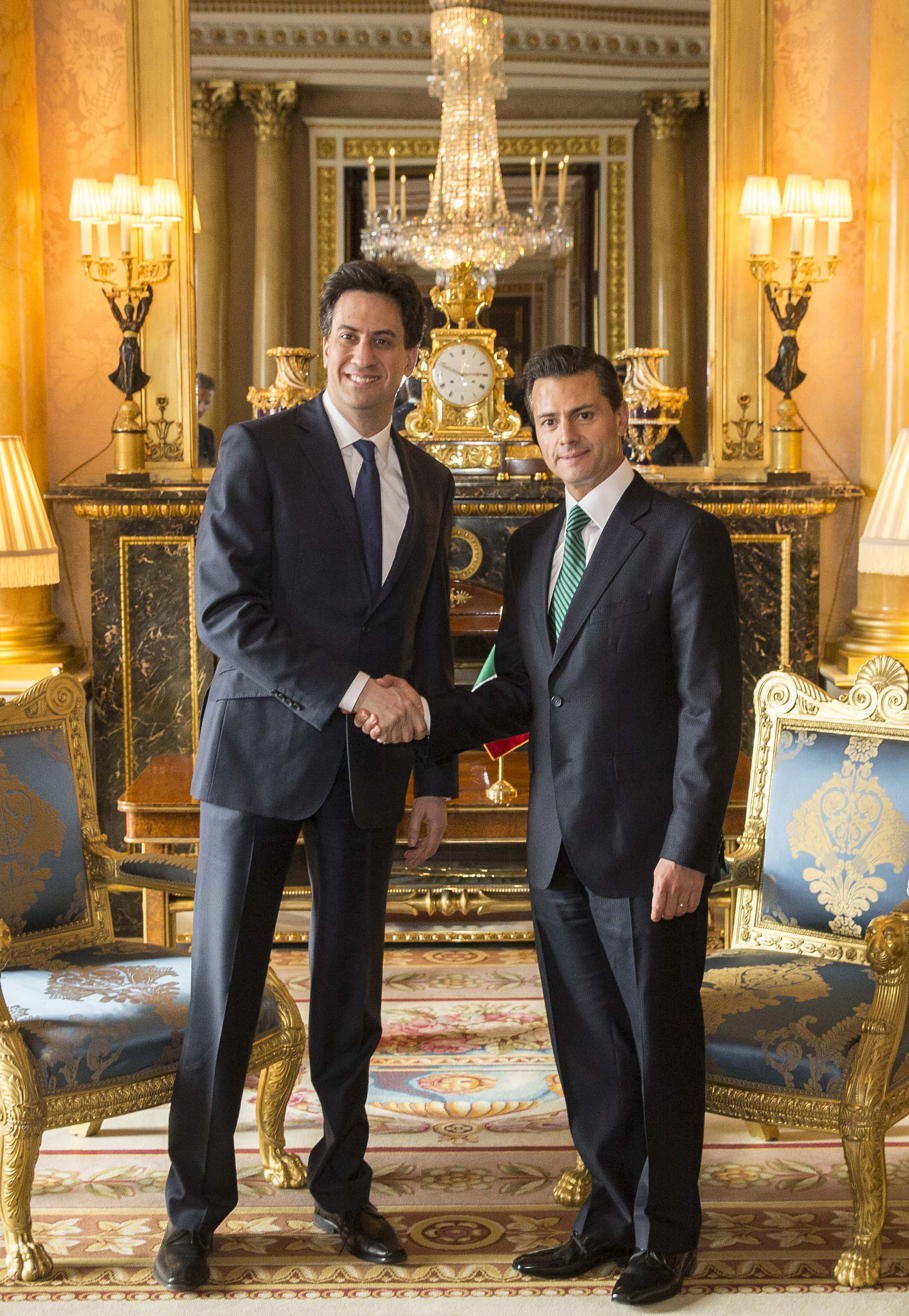
Miliband with Mexican president Enrique Peña Nieto, 2015

Miliband's first electoral tests as Labour Leader came in the elections to the Scottish Parliament, Welsh Assembly and various councils across England, excluding London, on 5 May 2011. The results for Labour were described as a "mixed bag", with the party performing well in Wales – falling just one seat short of an overall majority and forming the next Welsh Government on its own – and making large gains from the Liberal Democrats in northern councils, including Sheffield, Leeds, Liverpool and Manchester.

Miliband launched Labour's campaign for the 2012 local elections with a speech in Birmingham, accusing the coalition government of "betrayal", and claiming that it "lacked the values" that Britain needed. The Labour results were described as a success, with the party building on its performance the previous year in the north of England and Wales, consolidating its position in northern cities and winning control of places such as Cardiff and Swansea. Labour performed well in the Midlands and South of England, winning control of councils including Birmingham, Norwich, Plymouth and Southampton. Labour was less successful in Scotland than England and Wales, but retained control of Glasgow despite predictions it would not. Overall, Labour gained over 800 councillors and control of 22 councils.

In April 2013, Miliband pledged ahead of the upcoming county elections that Labour would change planning laws to give local authorities greater authority to decide what shops can open in their high streets. He also said that Labour would introduce more strenuous laws relating to pay-day lenders and betting shops. Labour subsequently gained nearly 300 councillors, as well as control of Nottinghamshire and Derbyshire County Councils.

In May 2014, Miliband led Labour through the European Parliament elections, where the party increased its number of Members of the European Parliament from 13 to 20. Labour came second with 24.4% of the vote, finishing ahead of the Conservatives but behind UKIP. This was the first time since the 1984 that the largest opposition party had failed to win the most seats in European elections. On the same day, Labour polled ahead of all other parties at the local elections, winning 31% of the vote and taking control of six additional councils.

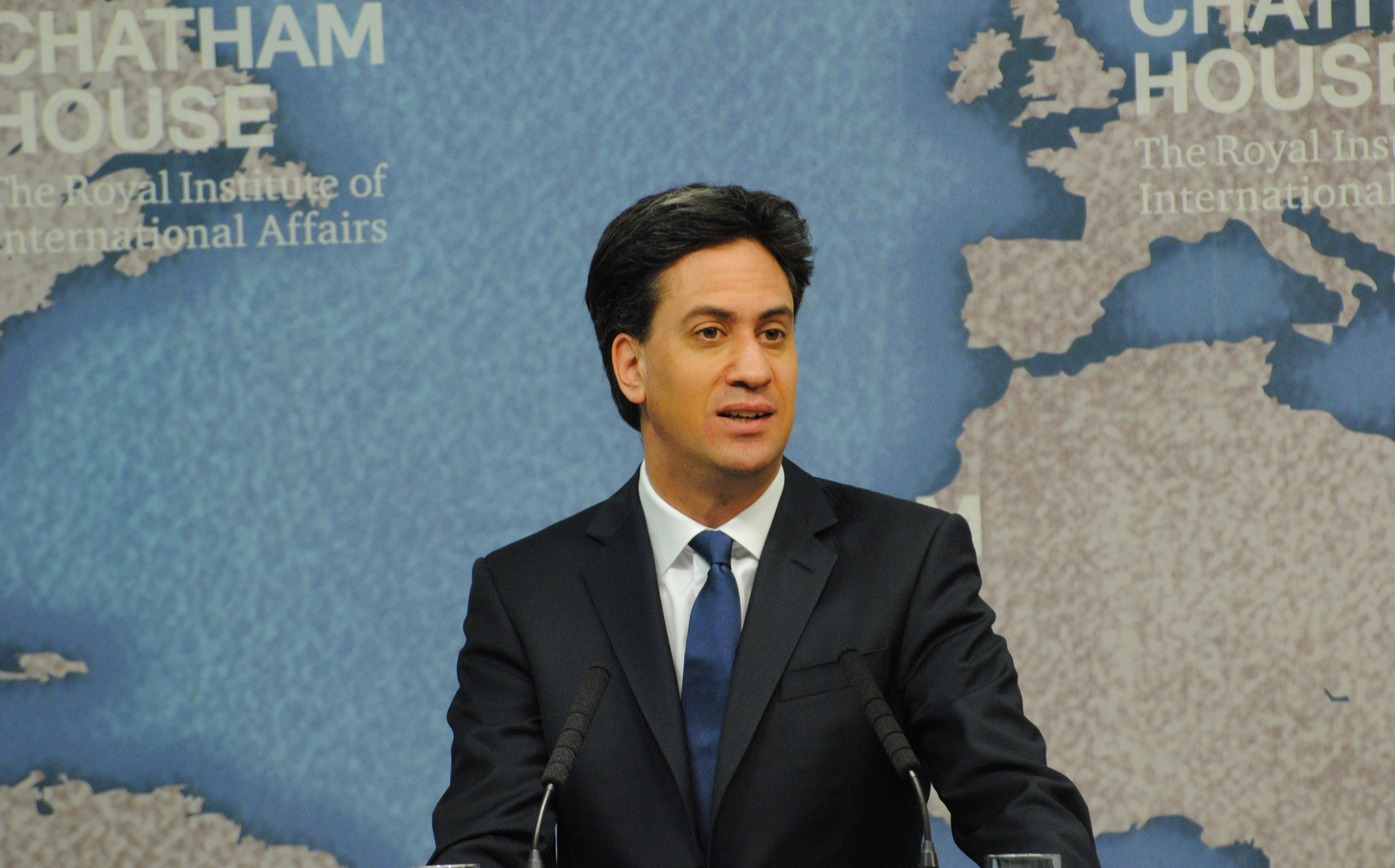
Miliband at Chatham House, 2015

On 30 March 2015, a general election was called for 7 May. Miliband began his campaign by launching a "manifesto for business", stating that only by voting Labour would the UK's position within the European Union be secure. Miliband subsequently unveiled five pledges at a rally in Birmingham which would form the focus of a future Labour government, specifically identifying policies on deficit reduction, living standards, the NHS, immigration controls and tuition fees. He included an additional pledge on housing and rent on 27 April. On 14 April, Labour launched its full manifesto, which Miliband said was fully funded and would require no additional borrowing. During this time an online campaign began known as Milifandom.

Miliband was portrayed during Labour's 2015 election campaign as being genuine in his desire to improve the lives of working people and to display progression from New Labour, but was unable to defeat interpretations of him as being ineffectual, or even cartoonish in nature. Miliband insisted that Cameron should debate him one on one as part of a televised election broadcast in order to highlight differences in policies between the two major parties, but this did not happen, with the pair instead being interviewed separately by Jeremy Paxman as part of the first major televised political broadcast of the election involving multiple parties.

Despite opinion polls leading up to the general election predicting a tight result, Labour decisively lost the 7 May general election to the Conservatives. Although gaining 22 seats, Labour lost all but one of its MPs in Scotland and ended up with a net loss of 26 seats, failing to win a number of key marginal seats that it had expected to win comfortably. After being returned as MP for Doncaster North, Miliband stated that it had been a "difficult and disappointing" night for Labour. Following Cameron's success in forming a majority government, Miliband resigned as Leader of the Labour Party on 8 May, with Harman becoming acting leader while a leadership election was initiated. Jeremy Corbyn succeeded Miliband as leader.

== In opposition post-leadership (2015–2024) ==
=== Backbencher ===
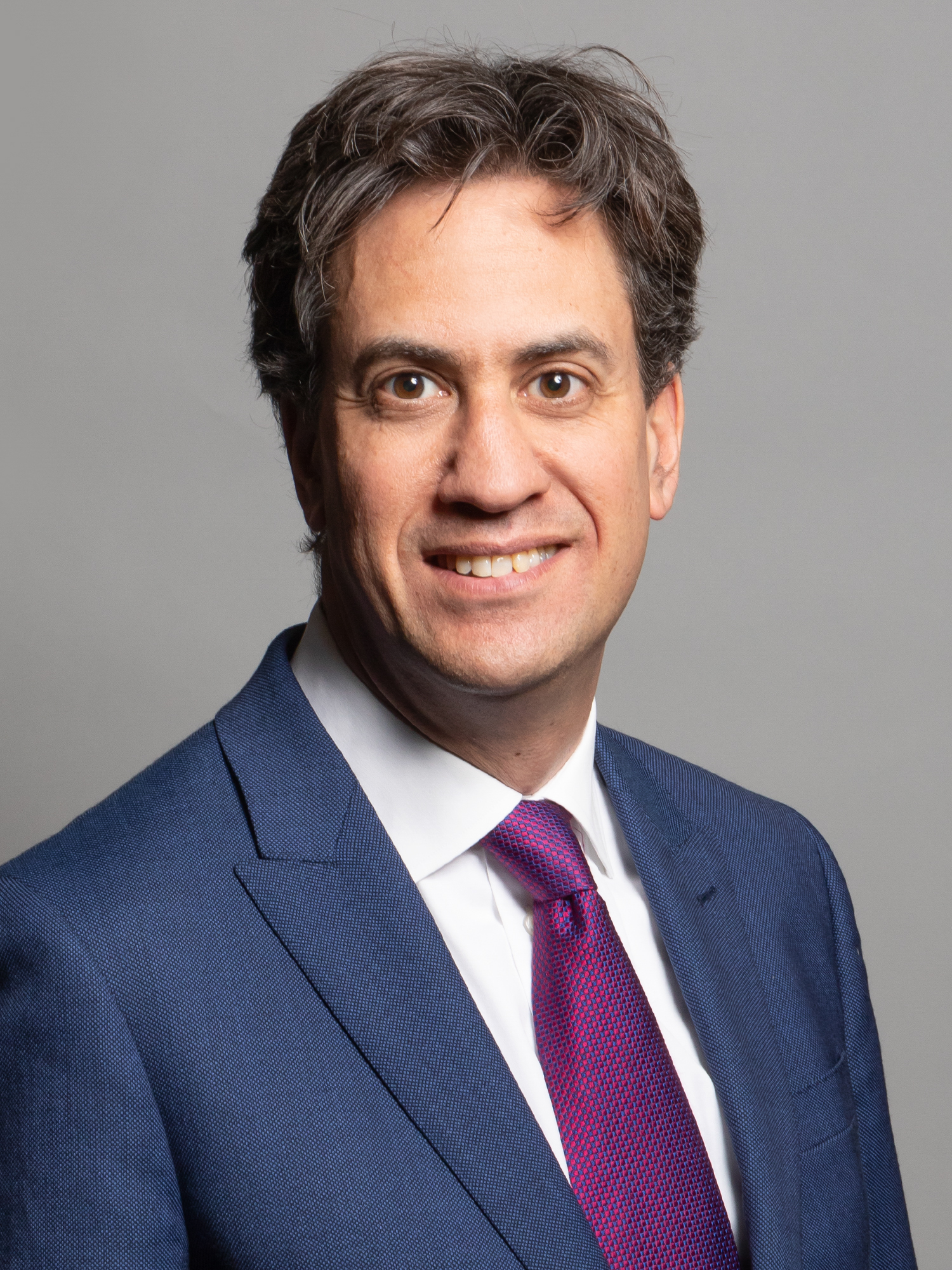
Official portrait, 2020

As a backbencher, Miliband spoke about the need to tackle inequality and in favour of the Paris climate change agreement. In May 2016, he appeared on the BBC's Question Time, speaking in favour of Remain in the UK's EU referendum and he subsequently campaigned for a Remain vote.

In the aftermath of the referendum result, Miliband said that, although he had supported Jeremy Corbyn since his election as leader, he had "reluctantly reached the conclusion his position [was] untenable", calling for Corbyn to step down in June 2016. In the ensuing contest, Miliband supported leadership challenger Owen Smith. Miliband later admitted that he was "clearly wrong" to call for Corbyn's resignation. In September 2016, Miliband joined the editorial board of The Political Quarterly journal, an unremunerated role.

Renewing his previous stance on the issue in 2011, Miliband criticised Rupert Murdoch's bid to take over telecommunications company Sky in December 2016, subsequently supporting an inquiry by Ofcom.

At the snap 2017 general election, Miliband was again re-elected with an increased vote share of 60.8% and an increased majority of 14,024.

At the 2019 general election, Miliband was again re-elected, with a decreased vote share of 38.7% and a decreased majority of 2,370. Following the election, it was announced that Miliband would sit on a panel of party figures to overview and investigate the electoral failure.

=== Return to Shadow Cabinet ===
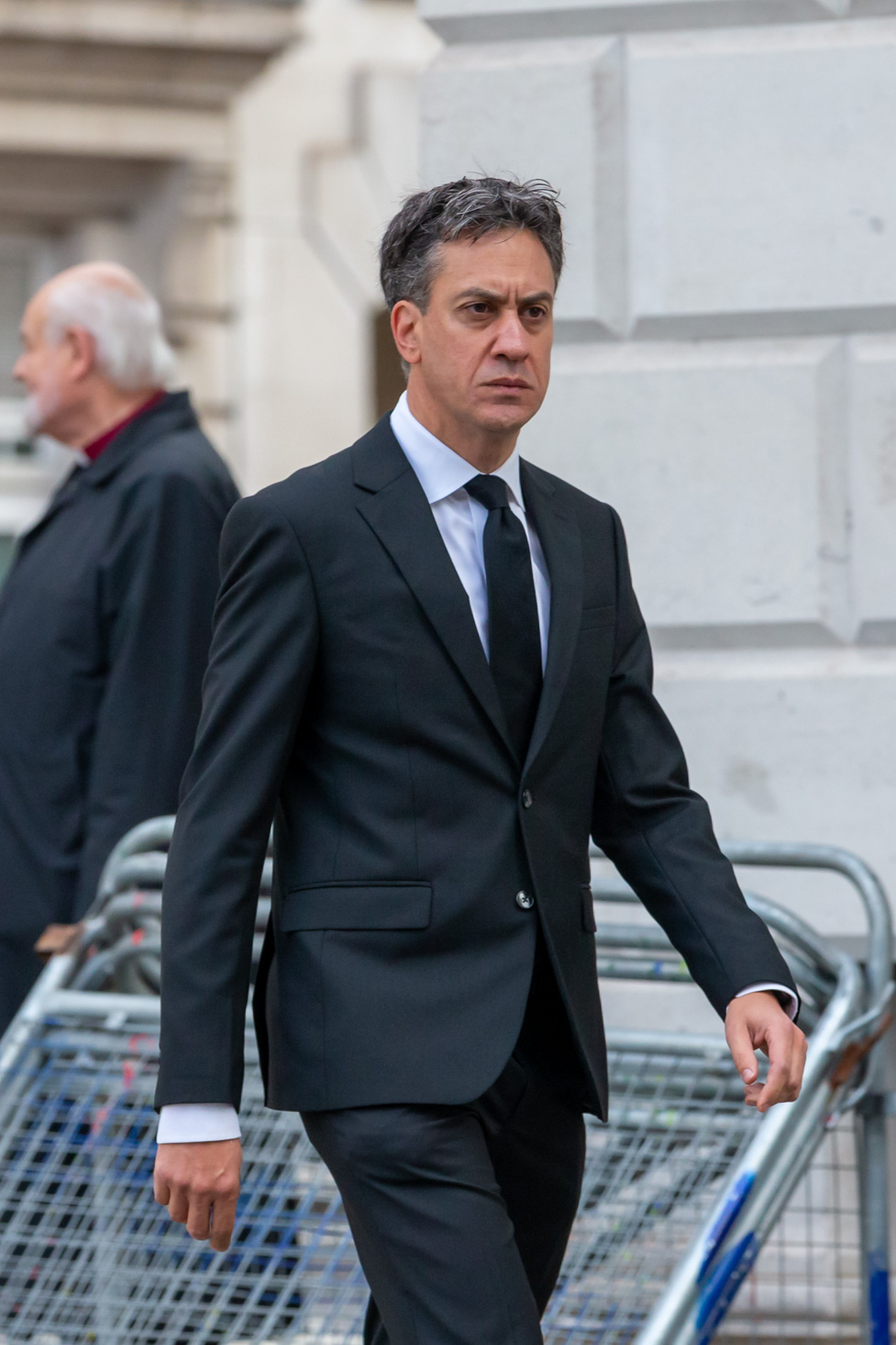
Miliband, September 2022

==== Shadow Business Secretary ====
On 6 April 2020, Keir Starmer appointed Miliband to his Shadow Cabinet, after winning the contest to become leader of the Labour Party two days before. Miliband assumed the role of Shadow Secretary of State for Business, Energy and Industrial Strategy in the new shadow cabinet.

In September 2020, Miliband faced Prime Minister Boris Johnson during a debate on the UK Internal Market Bill, in a speech accusing him of "legislative hooliganism".

On 27 October 2021, Miliband took Prime Minister's Questions following the October 2021 budget on behalf of Keir Starmer, who had contracted COVID-19.

==== Shadow Climate Change and Net Zero Secretary ====
In the November 2021 shadow cabinet reshuffle, Miliband was appointed to the newly established post of Shadow Secretary of State for Climate Change and Net Zero, assuming the energy responsibility from his previous role. He was succeeded as Shadow Secretary of State for Business and Industrial Strategy by Jonathan Reynolds. Miliband did not have a direct department to shadow until February 2023, when Grant Shapps was appointed Secretary of State for Energy Security and Net Zero in the new Department for Energy Security and Net Zero. Accordingly, Miliband's portfolio was renamed to Shadow Secretary of State for Energy Security and Net Zero, mirroring that of the government, in the 2023 shadow cabinet reshuffle.

Miliband's re-appointment to the cabinet also led to the New Statesman naming him the twenty-first most influential British left-wing figure of 2023.

== Energy Secretary (2024–2026) ==
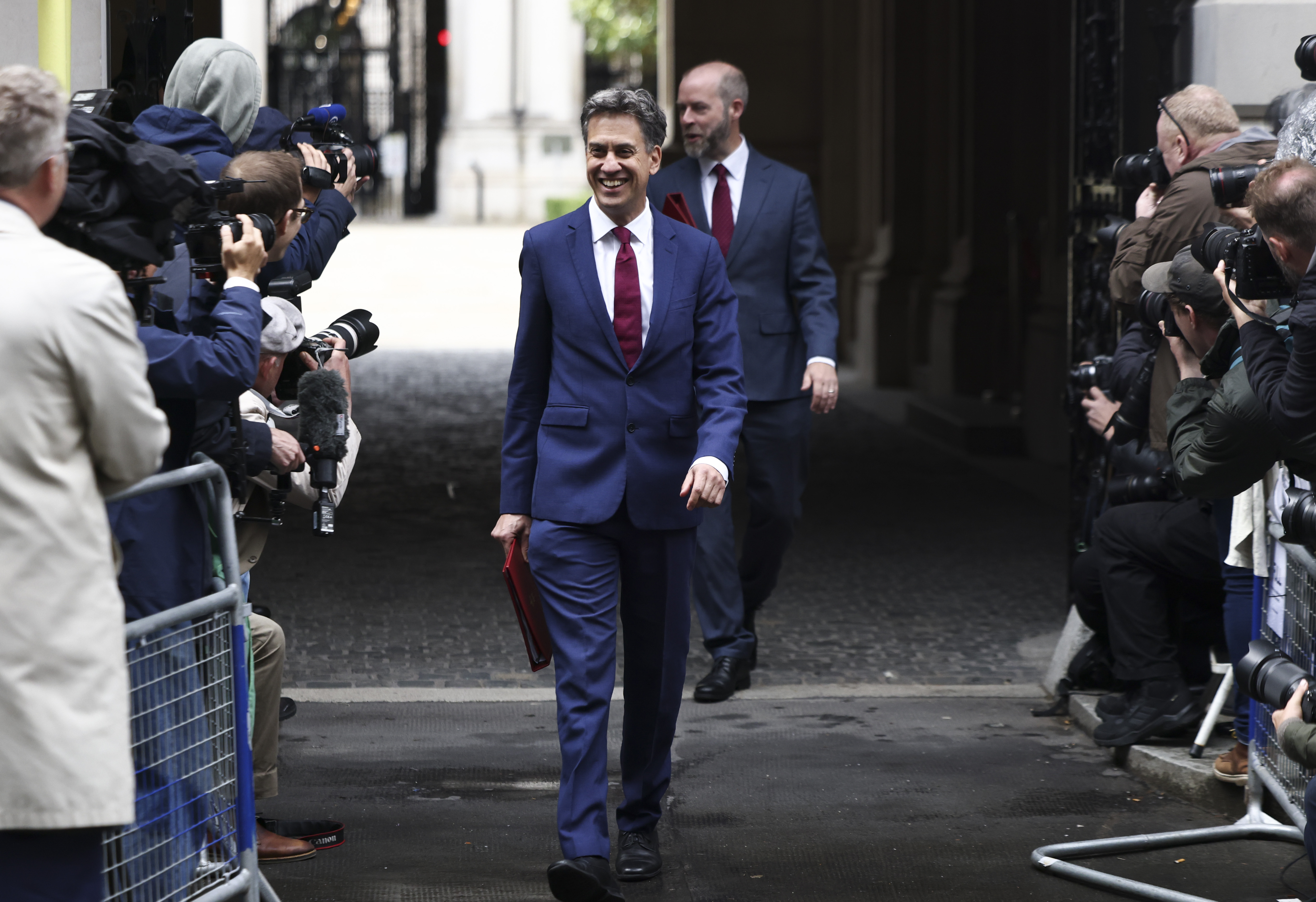
Miliband arriving at the first Cabinet meeting under Keir Starmer, 2024

At the 2024 general election, Miliband was again re-elected, with an increased vote share of 52.4% and an increased majority of 9,126. Following Labour's victory at the general election, Miliband was appointed Secretary of State for Energy Security and Net Zero by Starmer. He was among several ministers under Blair and Brown to be appointed to Starmer's cabinet. Two days after being appointed, Miliband lifted the onshore wind ban. As Energy Secretary, Miliband committed to aiming for clean power to meet 95% of electricity demand by 2030, and he pledged to lower average bills by £300 by the date.

In July 2024, Miliband announced the establishment of Great British Energy (GBE), which was tasked with investing in and developing clean infrastructure projects. The firm was supported with £8.3bn of government funding, which was paid for by a windfall tax on major oil and gas companies. In October, the government defeated an opposition tabled amendment which would have prioritised cutting energy bills by £300 a priority for GBE. £2.6bn of the original government funding for GBE was later diverted to fund Great British Nuclear.

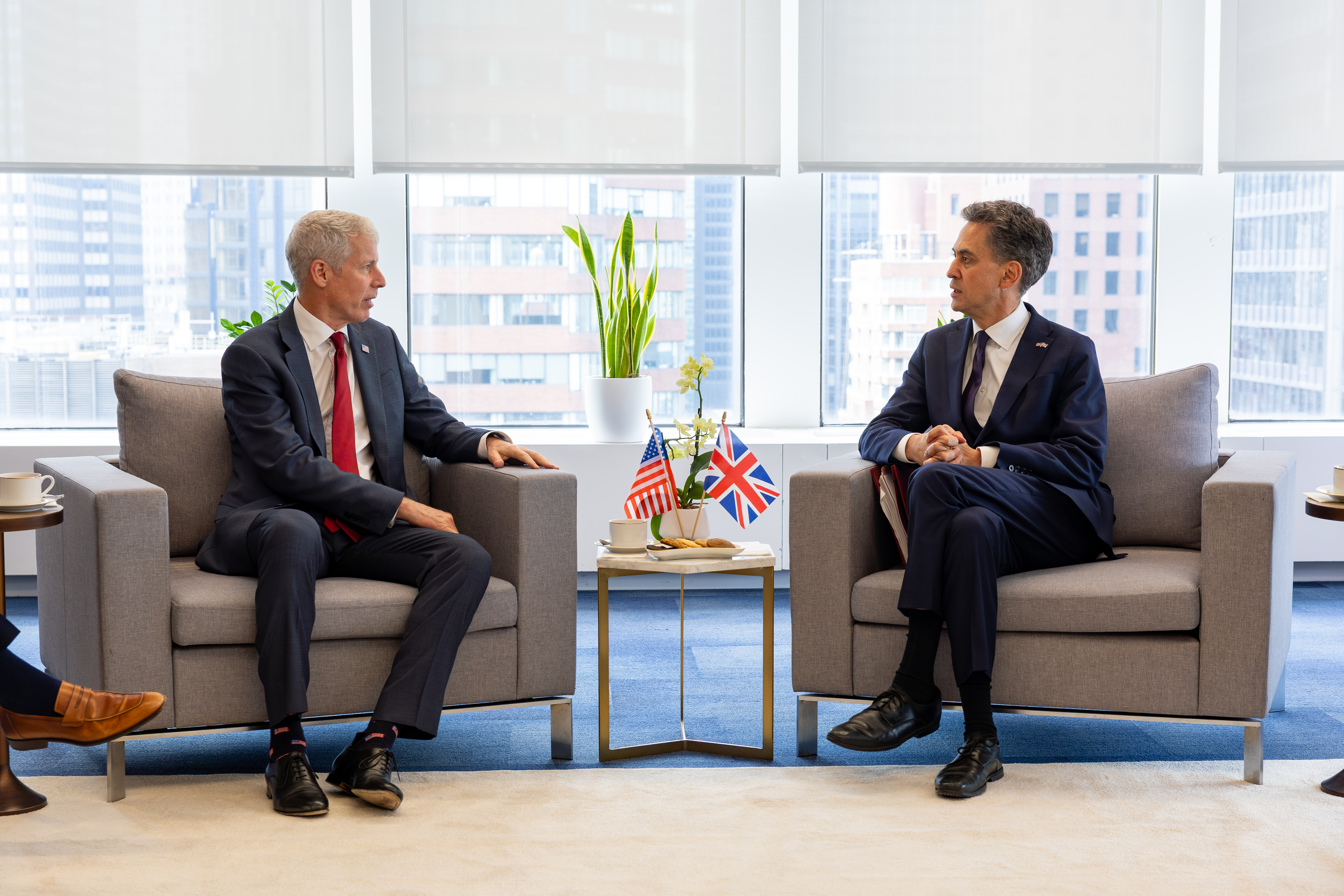
Miliband with United States Energy Secretary Chris Wright, 2025

In January 2025, he clarified that despite disagreeing with the prospect of building a third runway at Heathrow Airport, he would not be resigning over the matter. In October, he argued that the UK's dependence on fossil fuels was its "Achilles' heel", and reiterated his belief that clean energy was the only way to reduce bills.

As Energy Secretary, Miliband committed to the Labour party's manifesto pledge of banning new oil and gas licenses in the North Sea. Following the 2026 Iran war, amid fears of an energy shock rise, the policy came under further scrutiny from opposition parties and trade bodies, such as Offshore Energies UK. In March 2026, he rejected suggestions that drilling in the North Sea would bring prices down, describing it as "totally false". In April, Miliband announced new clean energy measures in response to the Iran war, which included encouraging the rapid take-up of solar panels and electric vehicles, expanding the use of solar on public land, and delinking gas and electricity prices. Miliband argued that "you can't solve a fossil fuels crisis by doubling down on fossil fuels". In the 2026 King's speech, the proposed Energy Independence Bill included a legal prohibition on new drilling, as well as plans to legally ban onshore fracking.

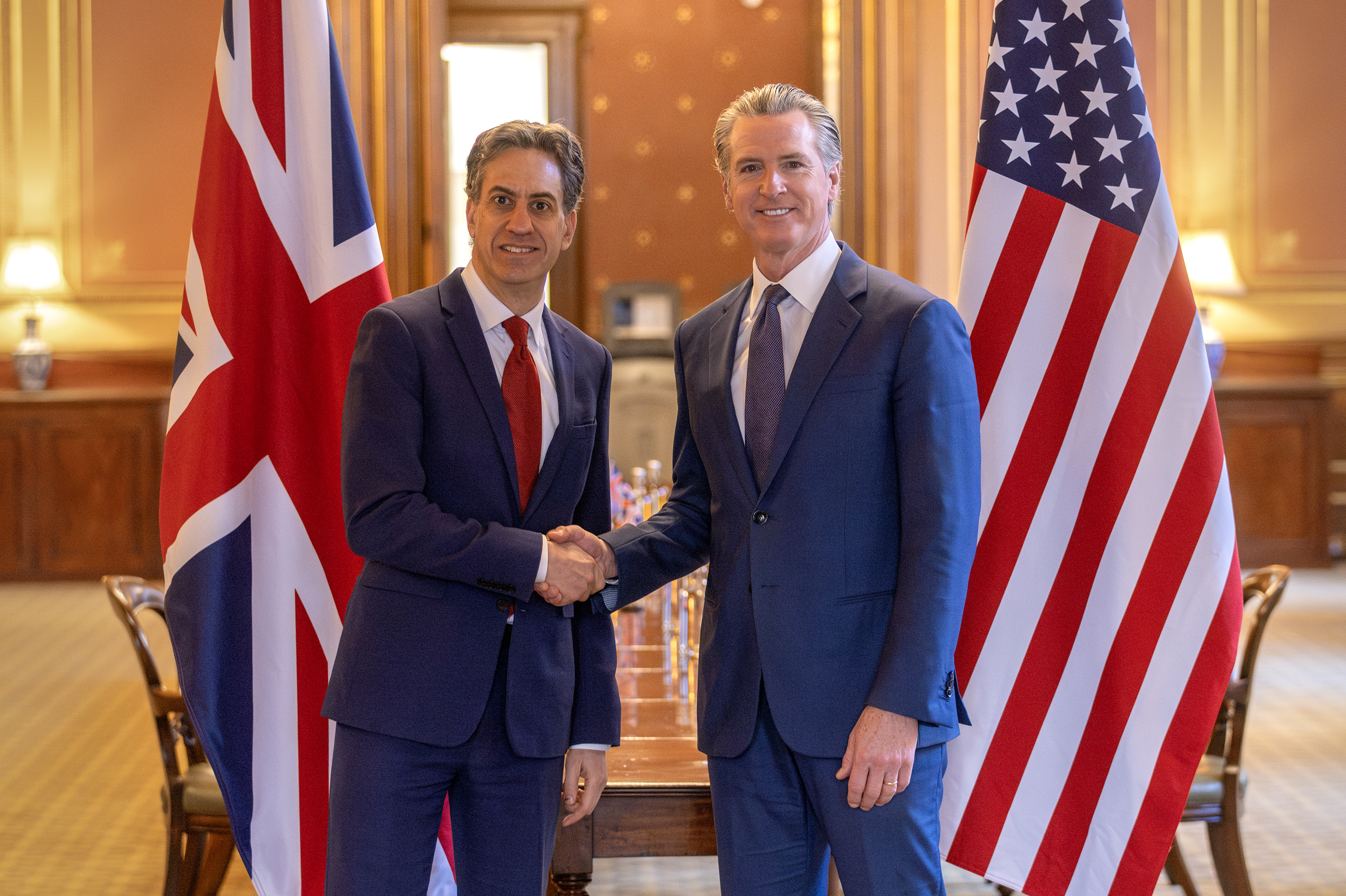
Miliband with California governor Gavin Newsom, 2026

In July 2026, Miliband approved the UK's second-largest solar farm, the proposed One Earth Solar Farm to be built in Nottinghamshire and Lincolnshire, after overruling opposition from his inspectors. The previous week, he approved the building of two other large solar farms, Pear Tree Hill in East Yorkshire and Dean Moor in West Cumbria. Despite recommendations from the inspectors against the building of farm due to concerns over its destruction of the environment, Miliband argued that the "only way to have energy security" was to take a "pro-growth approach to building more clean energy in Britain".

Following the 2026 local elections and the subsequent Labour leadership crisis, in May 2026 Miliband reportedly told Starmer to resign as Prime Minister and set out a timeline for his departure. Following the resignation of Starmer in June, Miliband called for Labour to "redouble our efforts to deliver the bold and credible change that the British people deserve". Miliband nominated Andy Burnham in the subsequent leadership election.

== Foreign Secretary (2026–present) ==
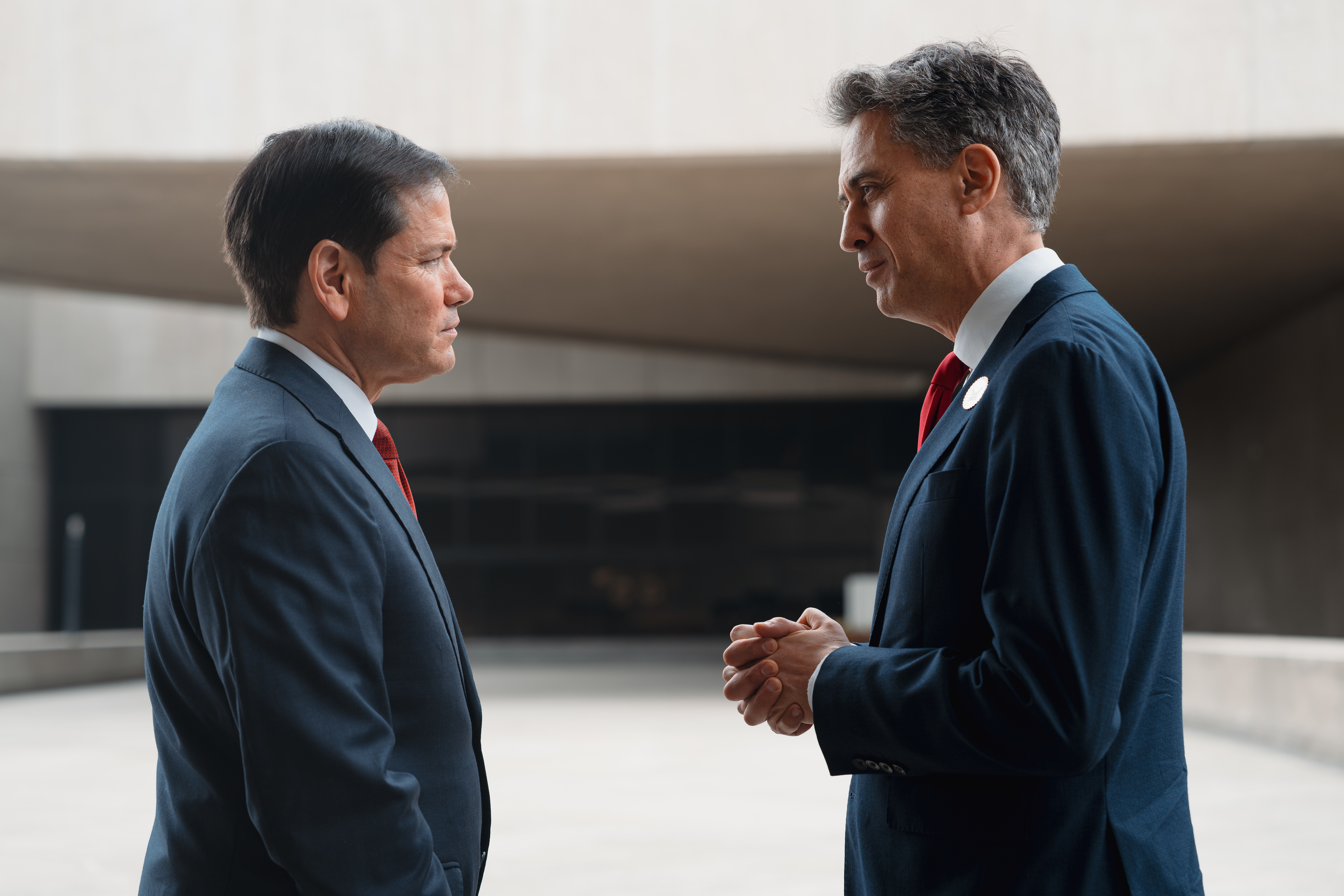
Miliband with US Secretary of State Marco Rubio on 23 July 2026.

After Andy Burnham became Prime Minister on 20 July 2026, Burnham appointed Miliband as Foreign Secretary, succeeding Yvette Cooper, who was appointed Secretary of State for Health and Social Care. With Miliband's appointment as Foreign Secretary, he and his brother, David Miliband, became the first pair of brothers in modern British history to have both held the office. David Miliband previously served as Foreign Secretary from 2007 to 2010 under Gordon Brown. The two brothers had previously made history in 2007 by becoming the first siblings to serve in the same Cabinet since Lord Edward and Oliver Stanley in 1938.

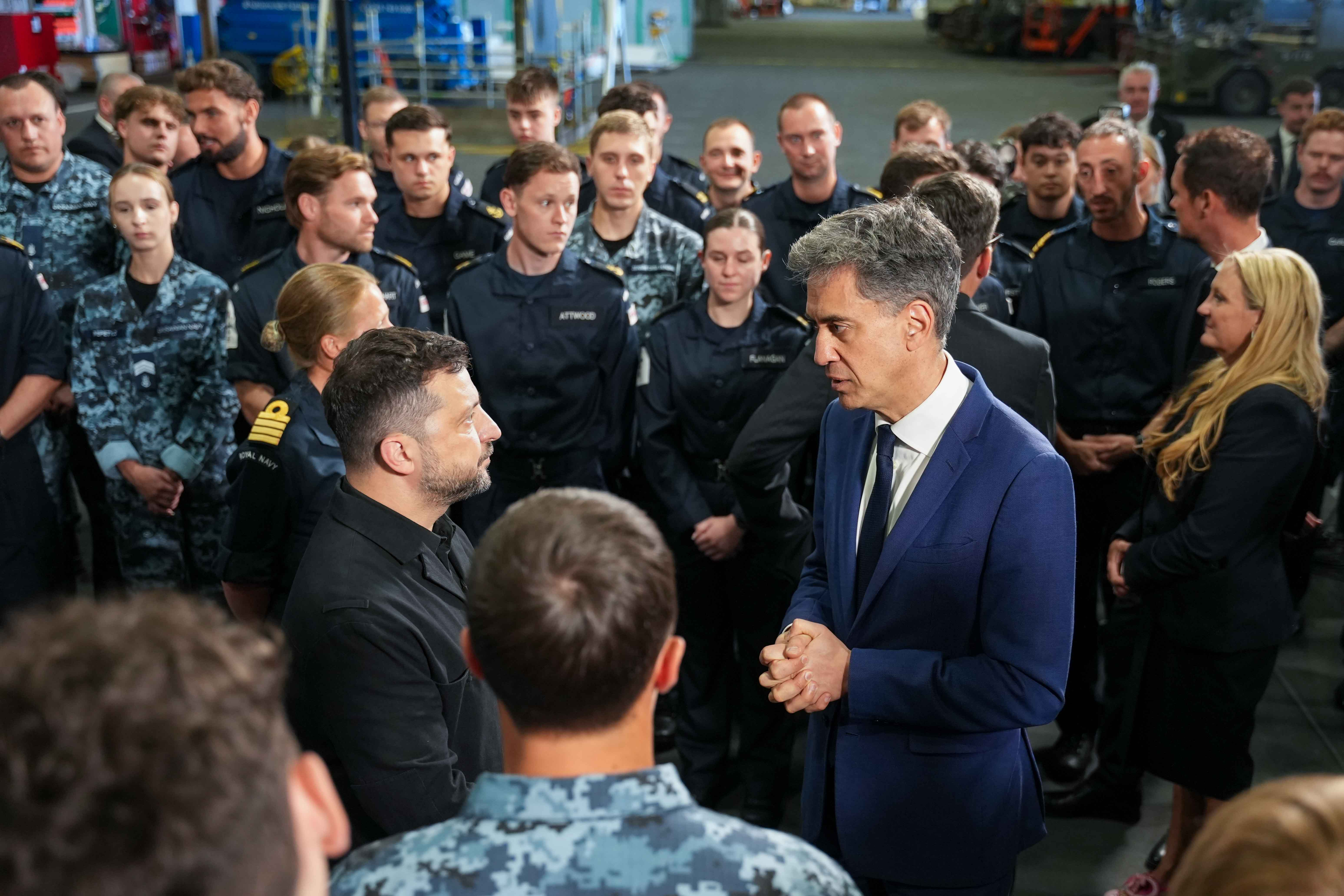
Miliband with Ukrainian president Volodymyr Zelenskyy on 27 July 2026.

Miliband's first overseas engagement as Foreign Secretary was attending a meeting of ASEAN foreign ministers in Manila, two days after taking office. During the meeting, he called for the de-escalation of the Iran war. He said that any diplomatic settlement should reopen the Strait of Hormuz and uphold freedom of navigation. Miliband also welcomed the Islamabad Memorandum providing toll-free passage through the strait for 60 days, although its implementation stalled following Iranian attacks on tankers in the area.

On 27 July 2026, Miliband announced that he would take up a seat on the World Bank, a position usually taken up by a junior minister, which he asserted was an indication that international development and the climate crisis were "central" to government policy.

On 8 September 2026, Miliband announced that the United Kingdom would introduce sanctions on goods from illegal settlements in the West Bank to protect the prospects of the two-state solution after Israel announced the construction of settlement homes in the strategically important E1 area east of Jerusalem. In his speech to the House of Commons, Miliband said the move marked the "beginning of a new approach" to the Israeli–Palestinian conflict, which "not only calls out injustice and suffering but acts". This move was coordinated among 12 countries including Canada, France, Poland, and Spain.

== Policies and views ==
Miliband is generally seen as being on the soft left of the Labour Party.

=== Self-described views ===
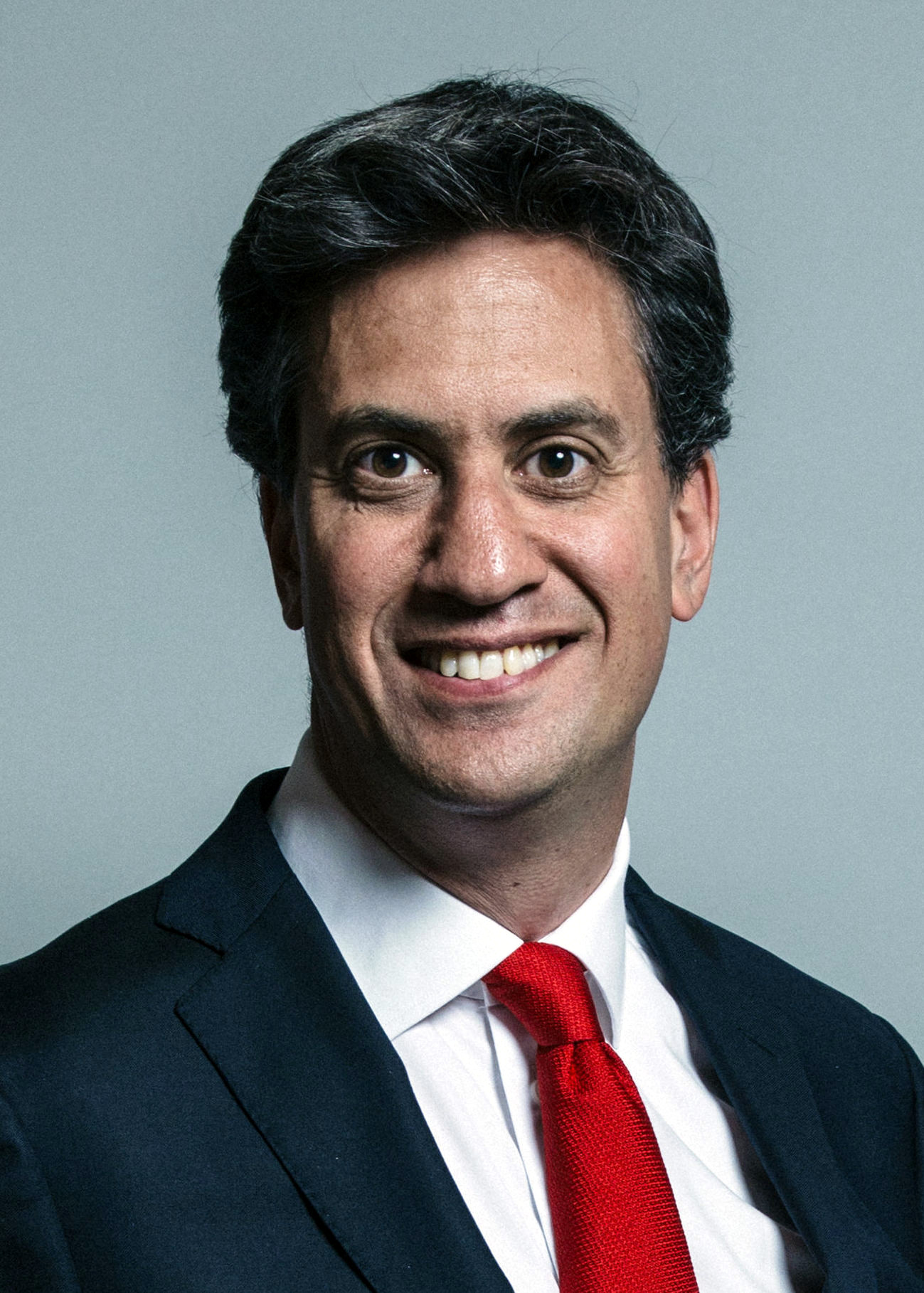
Official MP portrait, 2017

Miliband described himself as a new type of Labour politician, looking to move beyond the divisiveness of Blairism and Brownism, and calling for an end to the "factionalism and psychodramas" of Labour's past. He also repeatedly spoke of the need for a "new politics".

During the Labour leadership campaign, he described himself as a socialist, and spoke out against some of the actions of the Blair ministry, including criticising its record on civil liberties and foreign policy. Though he was not yet an MP at the time of the 2003 vote, Miliband was a strong critic of the Iraq War. He backed UK military action and intervention in Afghanistan and Libya respectively.

Miliband called for "responsible capitalism" when Google's Eric Schmidt commented on his corporation's non-payment of tax. He also supported making the UK's 50% top rate of tax permanent, as well as the institution of a new financial transaction tax, mutualising Northern Rock, putting limits on top salaries, scrapping tuition fees in favour of a graduate tax, implementing a living wage policy and the scrapping of the ID cards policy, and spoke in favour of a "National Care Service".

Miliband worked closely with the think tank Policy Network on the concept of predistribution as a means to tackle what he described as 'the growing crisis in living standards'. His announcement that predistribution would become a cornerstone of the UK Labour Party's economic policy was jokingly mocked by Prime Minister David Cameron during Prime Minister's Questions in the House of Commons.

Though Labour remained officially neutral, he in a personal capacity supported the failed "Yes to AV" campaign in the Alternative Vote referendum on 5 May 2011, saying that it would benefit Britain's "progressive majority". In September 2011, Miliband stated that a future Labour Government would immediately cut the cap on tuition fees for university students from £9,000 per year to £6,000, though he also stated that he remained committed to a graduate tax in the long-run. Together with Shadow Chancellor Ed Balls, Miliband also promoted a "five-point plan for jobs and growth" aimed at helping the UK economy, involving extending the bonus tax on banks pioneered by Alistair Darling, bringing forward planned long-term investment to help reduce unemployment, cutting the rate of VAT from 20% back to 17.5%, cutting VAT on home improvements to 5% for a temporary one-year period, and instigating a one-year National Insurance break to encourage employers to hire more staff. Miliband also endorsed the Blue Labour trend in the Labour Party, founded by Maurice Glasman. This was seen to have influenced his 2011 conference speech, signalling "predatory and productive capitalism".

Miliband is liberal in regard to issues of gender and sexuality. He publicly identifies as a feminist. In March 2012, Miliband pledged his support for same sex marriage. As he signed an 'equal marriage pledge', he said, "I strongly agree gay and lesbian couples should have an equal right to marry and deserve the same recognition from the state and society as anyone else."

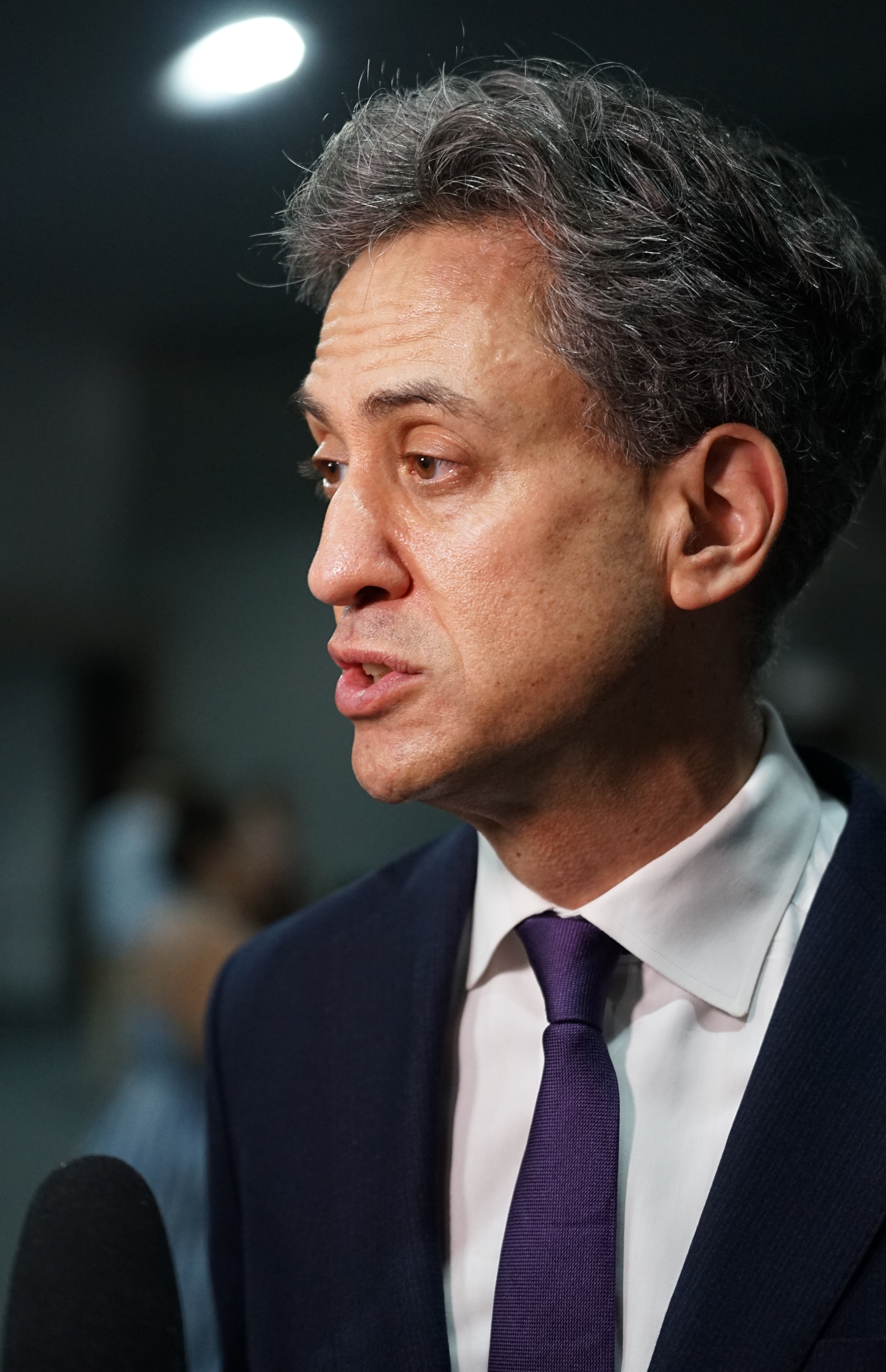
Miliband at COP30 in Belém, 2025

In June 2014, while speaking to the Labour Friends of Israel, Miliband stated that if he became Prime Minister he would seek "closer ties" with Israel and opposed the boycott of Israeli goods, saying that he would "resolutely oppose the isolation of Israel" and that nobody in the Labour Party should question Israel's right to exist. He also stated that, as a Jew and a friend of Israel, he must criticise Israel when necessary, opposing the "killing of innocent Palestinian civilians". Miliband criticised Israel for its conduct during the 2014 Israel–Gaza conflict.

Since the end of his leadership of the Labour Party, Miliband has expressed regret for not having been "radical enough" in his manifesto, and has described himself as "not following the normal route, which is to become more right wing as you get older", but instead becoming "more left wing".

On 30 April 2019, Miliband joined Caroline Lucas and Laura Sandys in calling for a Green New Deal in the UK.

=== Comments on other politicians ===
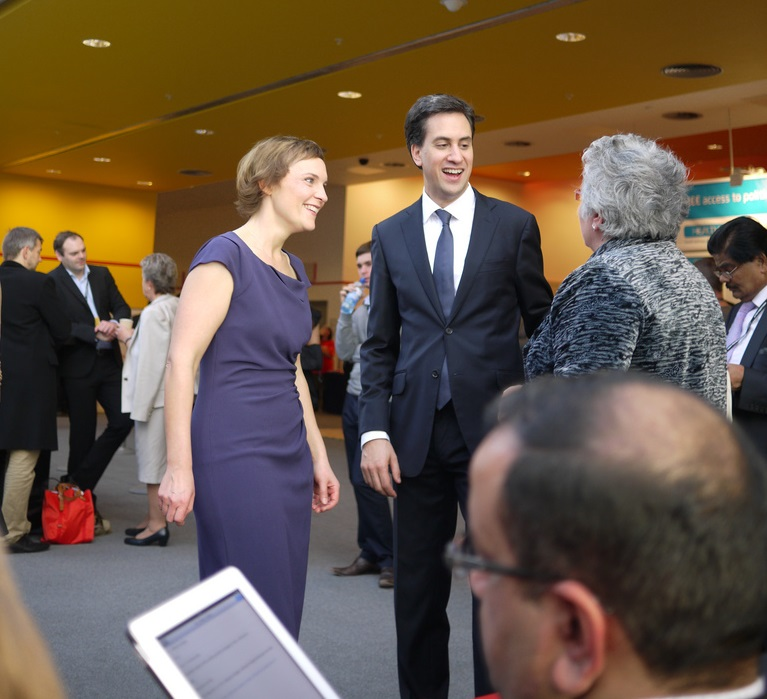
Miliband with his wife Justine at the 2011 Labour Party Conference

During his time as Labour leader, Miliband criticised the Conservative Leader and Prime Minister David Cameron for "sacrificing everything on the altar of deficit reduction", and has accused him of being guilty of practising "old politics", citing alleged broken promises on areas such as crime, policing, bank bonuses, and child benefit.

Miliband was also particularly critical of former Liberal Democrat Leader and Deputy Prime Minister Nick Clegg following the Conservative–Liberal Democrat coalition agreement, accusing him of "betrayal" and of "selling-out" his party's voters. In 2010, he stated that he would demand Clegg's resignation before any Labour–Liberal Democrat coalition under his leadership. In the 2011 Alternative Vote referendum campaign he refused to share a platform with Clegg, stating that he had become "too toxic" a brand and that he would harm the "Yes to AV" campaign. He shared platforms during the campaign with former Liberal Democrat Leaders Lord Ashdown and Charles Kennedy, Liberal Democrat Deputy Leader Simon Hughes, the Green Party Leader Caroline Lucas and Business Secretary Vince Cable, among others. As Labour leader, Miliband made speeches aimed at winning over disaffected Liberal Democrats, identifying a difference between "The Orange Book" Lib Dems, who were closer to the Conservatives, and Lib Dems on the centre-left, offering the latter a role in helping Labour's policy review at that time.

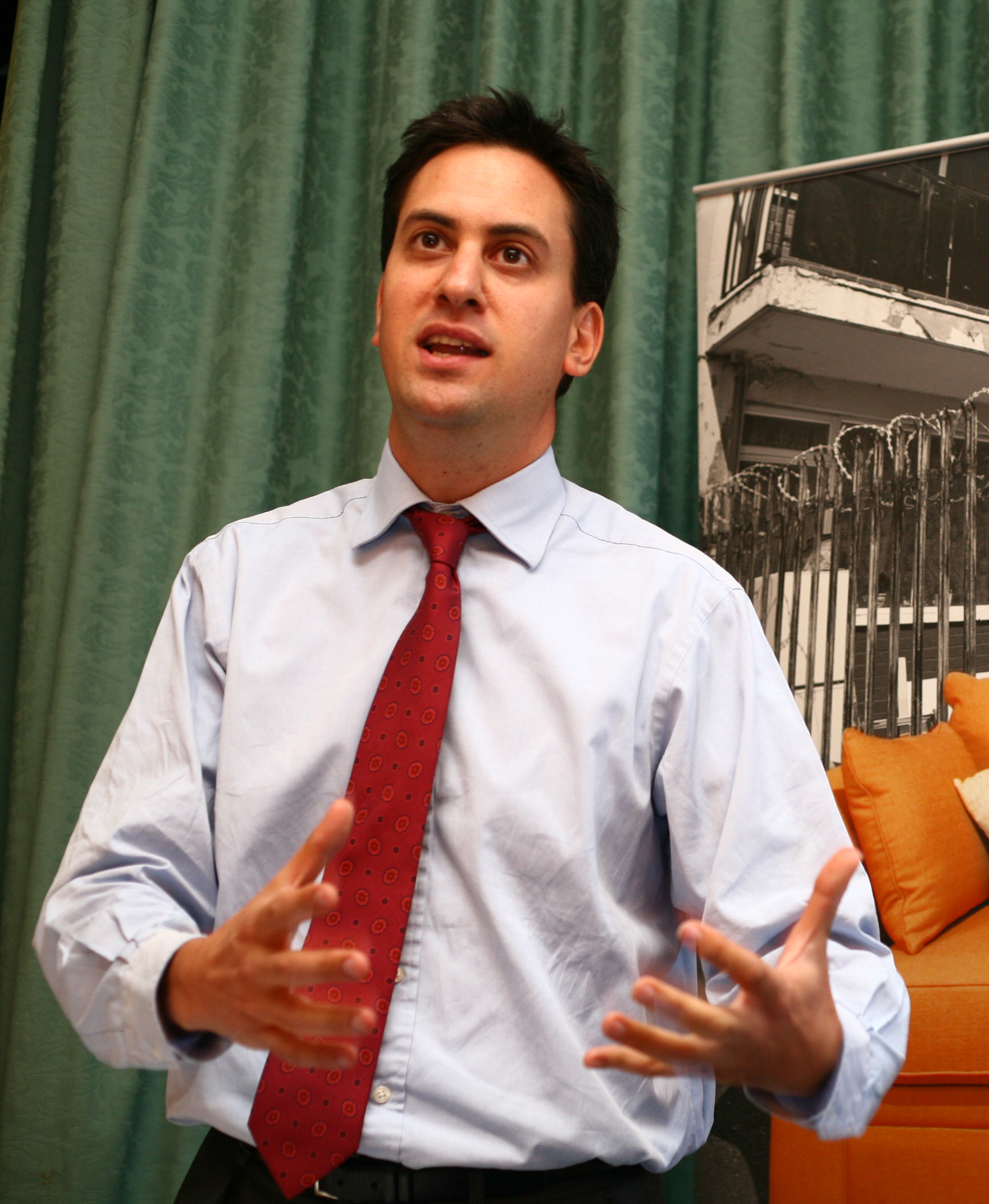
Miliband in 2007

Following the death of former Prime Minister and Conservative Leader Margaret Thatcher in 2013, Miliband spoke in a House of Commons sitting specially convened to pay tributes to her. He noted that, although he disagreed with a few of her policies, he respected "what her death means to the many, many people who admired her". He also said that Thatcher "broke the mould" in everything she had achieved in her life, and that she had had the ability to "overcome every obstacle in her path". He had previously praised Thatcher shortly before the Labour Party Conference in September 2012 for creating an "era of aspiration" in the 1980s.

Miliband has previously spoken positively of his brother David, praising his record as Foreign Secretary, and saying that "his door was always open" following David's decision not to stand for the Shadow Cabinet in 2010. Upon David's announcement in 2013 that he would resign as a Labour MP and move to New York to head the International Rescue Committee, Miliband said that British politics would be "a poorer place" without him, and that he thought David "would once again make a contribution to British public life."

When asked to choose the greatest British Prime Minister, Miliband answered with Labour's post-war Prime Minister and longest-serving Leader, Clement Attlee. He has also spoken positively of his two immediate predecessors as Labour leader, Tony Blair and Gordon Brown, praising their leadership and records in government.

=== Media portrayal ===
Miliband was portrayed during Labour's 2015 election campaign as being genuine in his desire to improve the lives of working people and to display progression from New Labour, but he was unable to defeat interpretations of him as being ineffectual, or even cartoonish in nature. Political illustrators perceived a resemblance to Wallace of the British animation Wallace & Gromit and greatly exaggerated this in caricatures; various images circulated in the press and online media of Miliband performing day-to-day activities such as ineptly eating a bacon sandwich, donating money to a beggar, and giving a kiss to his wife, all while displaying apparently awkward facial expressions. In a March 2015 Newsnight election debate, he was challenged by Jeremy Paxman as to whether or not he was 'tough enough' to be Prime Minister, responding, "Hell yes, I'm tough enough", in reference to his reluctance to support air strikes against extremist targets in Syria.

== Other works ==
In June 2017, Miliband guest-presented Jeremy Vine's BBC Radio 2 show.

From 2017 to 2024, Miliband and Geoff Lloyd co-hosted a podcast, entitled Reasons to be Cheerful. In November 2017, Miliband and Lloyd appeared as joint guests on Richard Herring's Leicester Square Theatre Podcast.

== Personal life ==
Miliband is married to Justine Thornton, a High Court Judge. The couple met in 2004 at a dinner party hosted by journalist Stephanie Flanders. Although Miliband was briefly dating Flanders at the time, he and Thornton began their relationship a year later, before becoming engaged in March 2010 and married on 27 May 2011 at Langar Hall in Langar, Nottinghamshire. They have two sons, Daniel, born 2009, and Samuel, born 2010. They live in Dartmouth Park, north London.

Miliband is of Jewish heritage —the first ethnically Jewish leader of the Labour Party—and describes himself as a Jewish atheist. After marrying Thornton in a civil ceremony on 27 May 2011, he paid tribute to his Jewish heritage by following the tradition of breaking a glass. In 2012, Miliband wrote, "Like many others from Holocaust families, I have a paradoxical relationship with this history. On one level I feel intimately connected with it – this happened to my parents and grandparents. On another, it feels like a totally different world."

== Bibliography ==
- Miliband, Ed (2021). Go Big: 20 Bold Solutions to Fix Our World. London: Vintage. ISBN 9781529112757. OCLC 1337848748.

== Notes ==
Parliament of the United Kingdom
| Preceded by Kevin Hughes | Member of Parliament for Doncaster North; 2005–present | Incumbent |
Political offices
| Preceded by Phil Woolas | Minister for the Third Sector; 2006–2007 | Succeeded by Phil Hope |
| Preceded by Hilary Armstrong | Minister for the Cabinet Office; 2007–2008 | Succeeded by Liam Byrne |
| Preceded by Hilary Armstrong | Chancellor of the Duchy of Lancaster; 2007–2008 | Succeeded by Liam Byrne |
| New office | Secretary of State for Energy and Climate Change; 2008–2010 | Succeeded by Chris Huhne |
| Preceded by Greg Clark | Shadow Secretary of State for Energy and Climate Change; 2010 | Succeeded by Meg Hillier |
| Preceded by Harriet Harman | Leader of the Opposition; 2010–2015 | Succeeded by Harriet Harman |
| Preceded by Rebecca Long-Bailey | Shadow Secretary of State for Business, Energy and Industrial Strategy; 2020–2021 | Succeeded by Jonathan Reynolds |
| Preceded by Barry Gardiner as Shadow Secretary of State for Energy and Climate Change | Shadow Secretary of State for Climate Change and Net Zero; 2021–2024 | Succeeded by Claire Coutinho |
| Preceded by Claire Coutinho | Secretary of State for Energy Security and Net Zero; 2024–2026 | Succeeded by Miatta Fahnbulleh |
| Preceded by Yvette Cooper | Foreign Secretary; 2026–present | Incumbent |
Party political offices
| Preceded by Gordon Brown | Leader of the Labour Party; 2010–2015 | Succeeded by Jeremy Corbyn |
