= Please clap =

Phrase used by Jeb Bush in 2016

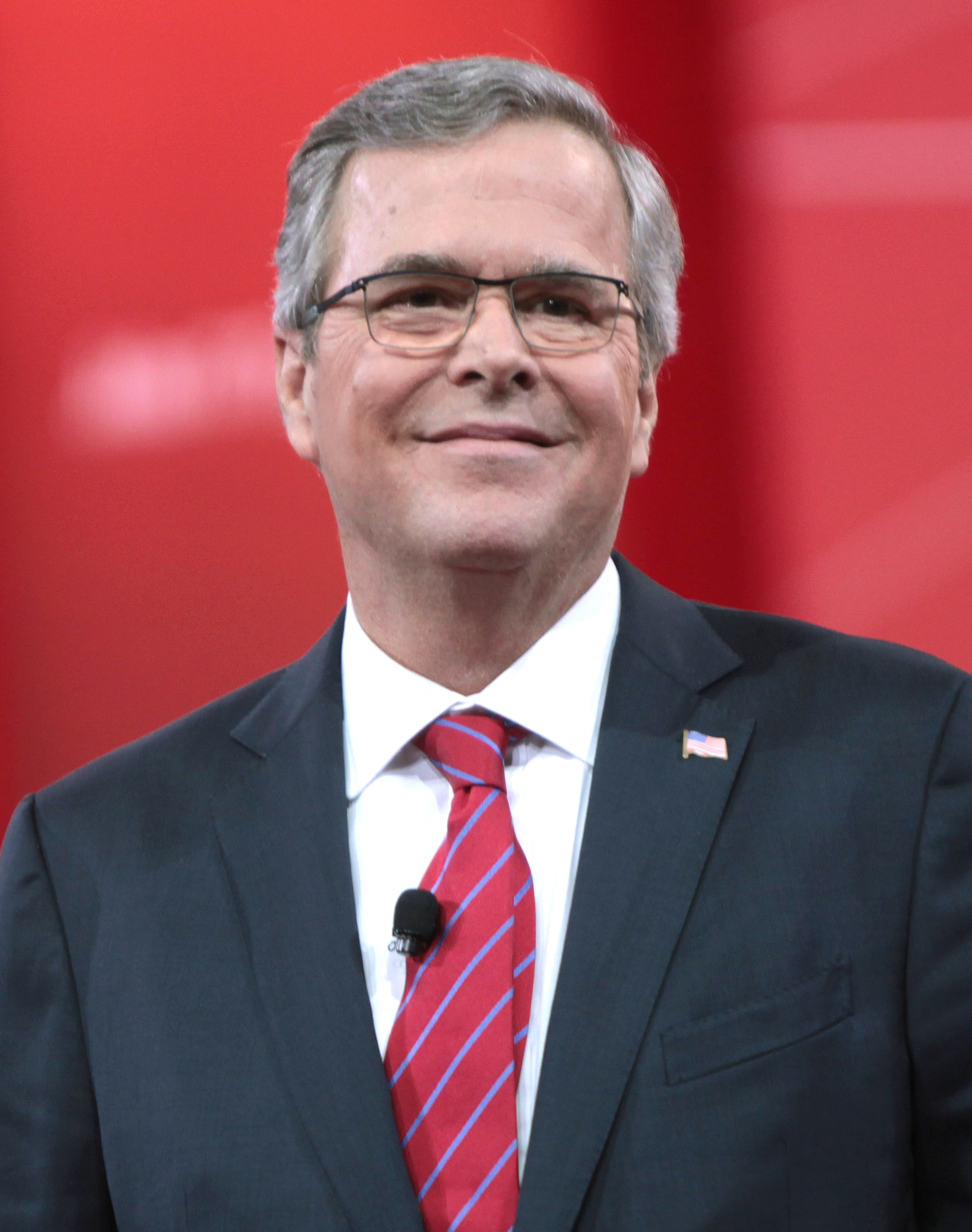
Jeb Bush, former Florida governor (1999–2007) and 2016 Republican presidential candidate

"Please clap" is a phrase that was used by the American politician Jeb Bush on February 2, 2016, while campaigning in New Hampshire during the 2016 Republican Party presidential primaries.

== Background ==
Jeb Bush, the 43rd governor of Florida and a brother of the former United States president George W. Bush, launched his 2016 presidential campaign on June 14, 2015. Seen as a moderate in the Republican Party, he struggled to find a message distinct from those of other Republican candidates. Bush instead emphasized his record as governor, but his perceived uninspiring message and the Bush family name led to his campaign being seen as representing the Republican establishment. He was mocked by his competitor Donald Trump, nicknaming him "Low-Energy Jeb." Bush's campaign failed to gain traction, polling at 3% by the end of 2015. Bush had placed sixth in the Iowa caucuses on February 1 with 2.8% of the vote.

== Description ==
On February 2, 2016, Bush was speaking at a town hall event at the Hanover Inn hotel in Hanover, New Hampshire. During the event, Bush made a contrast with more brash Republican candidates like Trump, stating:

"I will not trash talk. I will not be a divider in chief or an agitator in chief. I won't be out there blowharding, talking a big game without backing it up. I think the next president needs to be a lot quieter but send a signal that we're prepared to act in the national security interests of this country — to get back in the business of creating a more peaceful world."
[silence]
"Please clap."

This met silence from the crowd rather than the applause Bush expected. Bush spokeswoman Kristy Campbell told BuzzFeed News that the media had mischaracterized the event, describing "please clap" as a "charming moment".

== Reactions ==
"Please clap" was widely ridiculed and seen as emblematic of Bush's floundering campaign. MSNBC wrote that the moment "will be remembered as an unfortunate, and yet quintessential, phrase" around the Bush campaign. The New Republic called it a "succinct encapsulation of a flailing presidential campaign".

After Bush suspended his campaign on February 20, "please clap" was included on Vox's list of the "17 saddest moments" from Bush's campaign.

== Legacy ==
In December 2016, Inverse included "please clap" in its list of the best political Internet memes of 2016. In the following years, it continued to live on as an ironic pro-Bush internet meme alongside referring to Bush as Jeb!, the branding of his campaign. Brian Contreras of the Los Angeles Times wrote that the Internet memes of his campaign reflect a mocking of a "softer-spoken, more cautious conservatism" that "has less and less to offer voters in an increasingly polarized America".

In March 2019, Vanity Fair published an article on Bush encouraging a Republican to challenge the incumbent president, Trump, in the 2020 presidential election with the article's headline referencing "please clap".

Moments when other political candidates failed to garner enthusiasm from a crowd have drawn comparisons to "please clap". On April 22, 2019, CNN hosted a televised town hall event with Democratic presidential candidate Amy Klobuchar in which she spoke about how she had won every congressional district in Minnesota in each of her Senate elections. After the audience did not react, Klobuchar encouraged one, saying "It's when you guys are supposed to cheer, okay?" On January 21, 2020, Pete Buttigieg was speaking at a campaign event in Iowa, encouraging the unenthusiastic audience to cheer or clap by saying "come on".

== See also ==
- Act of Love (politics)
- Nasty woman
- 2016 Republican Party presidential primaries
