= 2010 Labour Party leadership election (UK) =

British leadership election to replace Gordon Brown

- 16 August – 25 September 2010
- Turnout: 127,330 (71.7%)
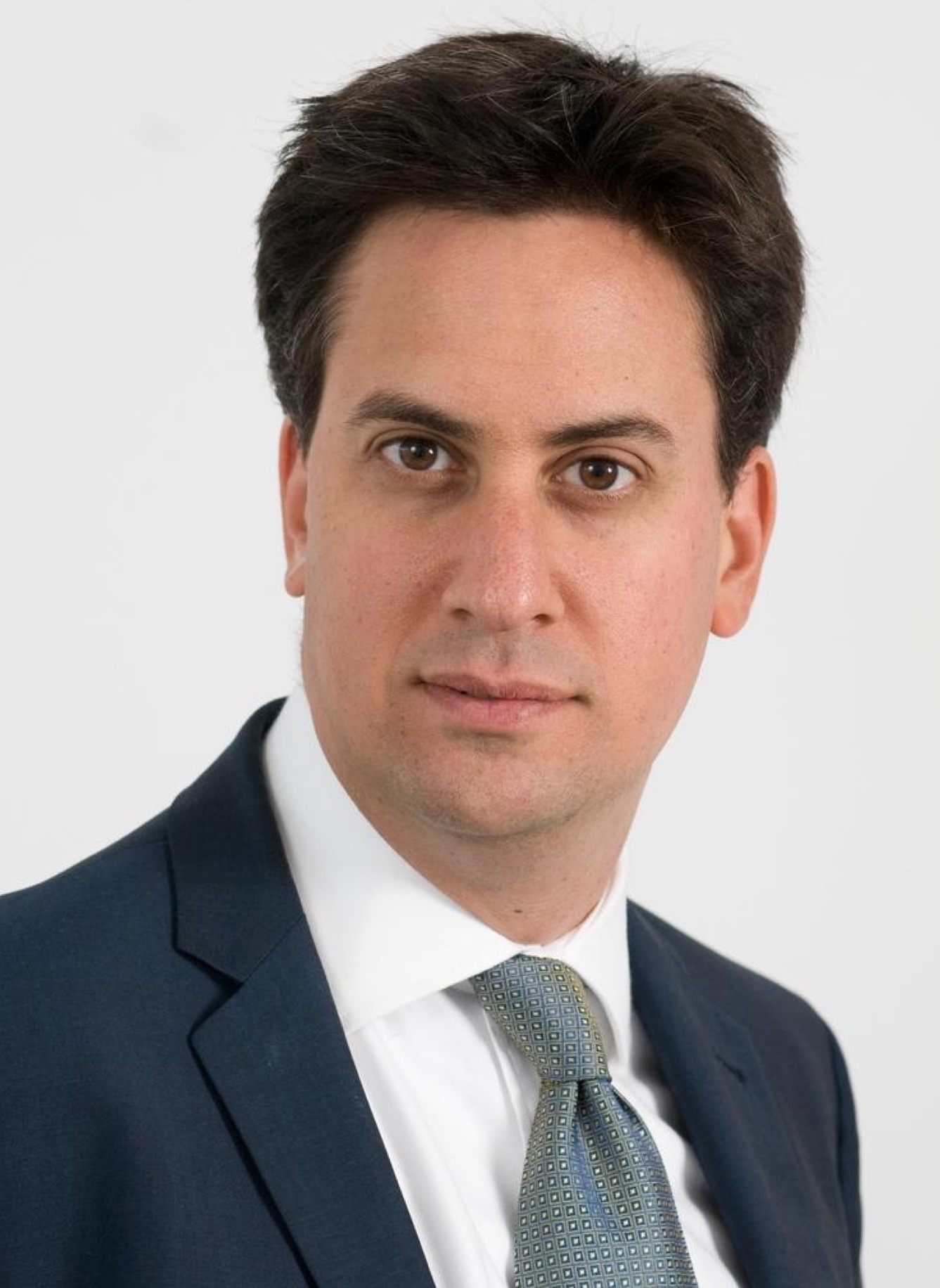

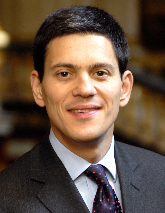

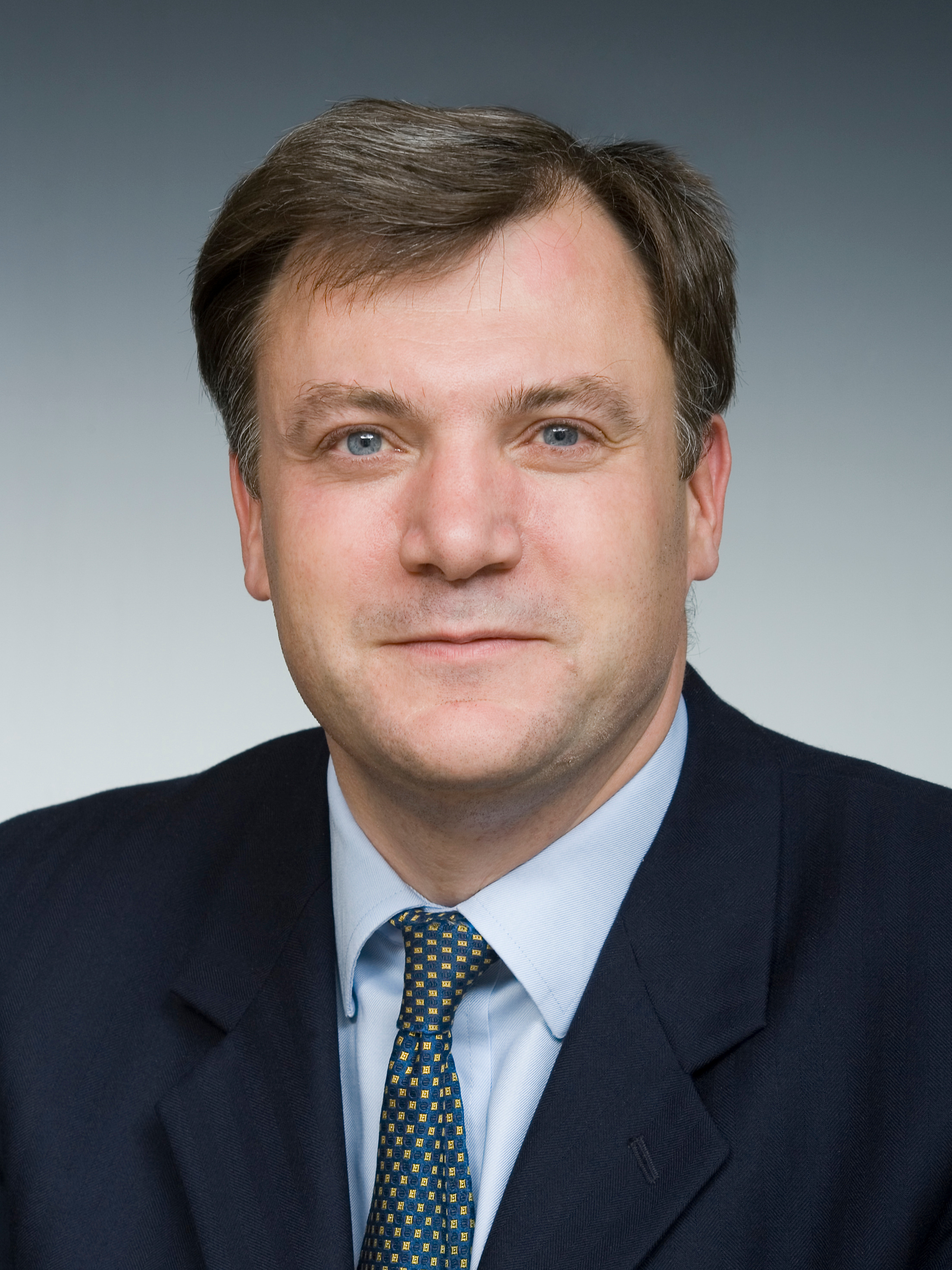

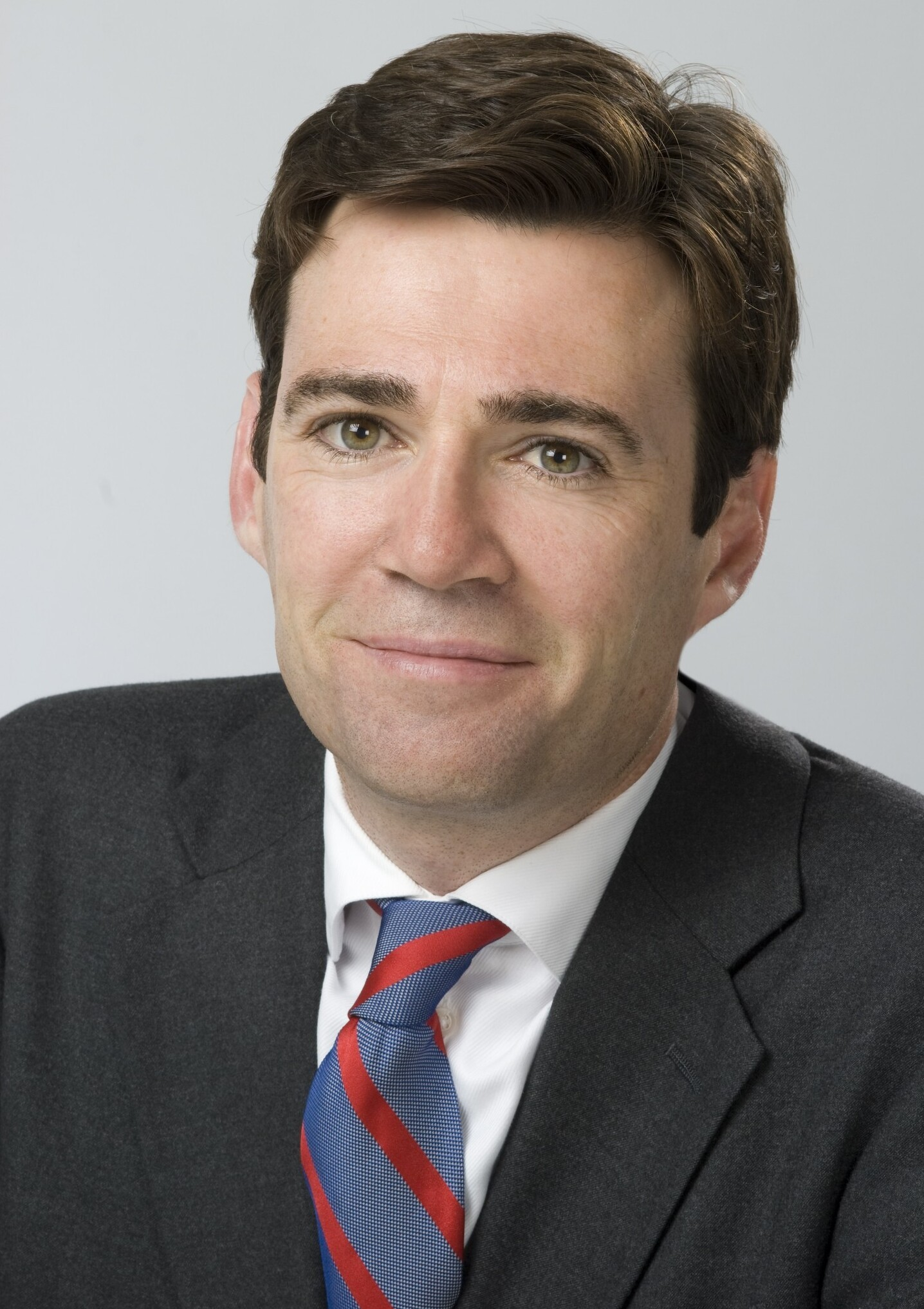

| Candidate | Ed Miliband | David Miliband | Ed Balls |
| First round | 34.3% | 37.8% | 11.8% |
| Final round | 50.7% | 49.3% | Eliminated |
| Candidate | Andy Burnham | Diane Abbott |
| First round | 8.7% | 7.4% |
| Final round | Eliminated | Eliminated |
Leader before election
Harriet Harman (interim)
Gordon Brown
Elected Leader
Ed Miliband

The 2010 Labour Party leadership election was triggered on 10 May 2010 by incumbent leader Gordon Brown's resignation following the 2010 general election which resulted in a hung parliament; the first since 1974. Brown resigned as Leader of the Labour Party on 10 May and as Prime Minister on 11 May, following the Conservatives and Liberal Democrats forming a coalition government. The National Executive Committee decided the timetable for the election the result of which would be announced at the annual party conference. On 25 September 2010, Ed Miliband became the new Leader of the Labour Party, narrowly defeating his older brother, David Miliband.

Andy Burnham, one of the candidates in the leadership election, would be elected leader of the party in 2026.

== Procedure ==
The rules of the Labour Party stated in 2010 that "each nomination [for leader] must be supported by 12.5 per cent of the Commons members of the Parliamentary Labour Party." As the number of Labour MPs was 257 (the 258 returned at the general election minus Eric Illsley, who had been suspended from the Parliamentary Labour Party) 33 MPs were needed to support any nomination. Nominations opened on 24 May and closed on 27 May, but the deadline was extended to 9 June after complaints from John McDonnell, Diane Abbott, and Ed Miliband that the short deadline had provided insufficient time to secure the 33 nominations from MPs needed for inclusion on the ballot. The ballot took place between 1 and 22 September, and the results were announced on the first day of the party's conference in Manchester, 25 September. There were three distinct electorates, the electors of which cast their votes on a "one member, one vote" basis in each applicable category:

1. Labour members of the House of Commons and the European Parliament
2. Individual members of the party
3. Individual members of affiliated organisations, such as trade unions and socialist societies

Each of the three electorates or sections contributed one third (33.33 per cent) of the total votes and were counted using the alternative vote system system. The election was run by the National Executive Committee, and the results were announced at the annual conference in September 2010.

=== Union recommendation controversy ===
Under Labour Party rules, trade unions were allowed to make recommendations to their members, but were barred from doing this in the same envelope that contained the ballot paper. During the election, it emerged that both the GMB and Unite had included both an envelope containing the ballot paper, and an envelope containing promotional material for Ed Miliband, their favoured candidate, in the same communication. Though the promotional material was in a different envelope from the ballot paper, this nevertheless attracted criticism that they had breached the spirit of the rules.

== Candidates ==
At a meeting of the Cabinet held on 10 May 2010, it was agreed that no one would announce their candidacy until after formal negotiations on forming a government were resolved. The Conservative Party and Liberal Democrats formed a coalition on 11 May, and David Miliband became the first person to announce his candidacy the following day. A total of six candidates emerged by 20 May:

- Diane Abbott, announced 20 May
- Ed Balls, announced 19 May
- Andy Burnham, announced 20 May
- John McDonnell, announced 18 May; withdrew 9 June
- David Miliband, announced 12 May
- Ed Miliband, announced 14 May

On 9 June John McDonnell withdrew from the contest in favour of Diane Abbott, who eventually made the ballot paper.

=== Nominations ===
Candidates must receive nominations from at least 12.5 per cent of the 257 Parliamentary Labour Party members (33) to appear on the ballot. John McDonnell had 16 nominations when he withdrew on 9 June, in favour of Diane Abbott. The final nominations figures were as follows:

| Candidate | Constituency | Nominations | Share |
|---|---|---|---|
| Diane Abbott | Hackney North and Stoke Newington | 33 | 12.84% |
| Ed Balls | Morley and Outwood | 33 | 12.84% |
| Andy Burnham | Leigh | 33 | 12.84% |
| David Miliband | South Shields | 81 | 31.52% |
| Ed Miliband | Doncaster North | 63 | 24.51% |

The number of MPs next to the candidate's name below includes the actual candidate too, as they counted as one of the 33 MPs needed (except for David Miliband, as he nominated Diane Abbott to ensure her appearance on the ballot). Public nominations for candidates by MPs were as follows:

- David Miliband (81): Bob Ainsworth, Douglas Alexander, Willie Bain, Gordon Banks, Hugh Bayley, Stuart Bell, Ben Bradshaw, Russell Brown, Richard Burden, Liam Byrne, David Cairns, Alan Campbell, Jenny Chapman, Ann Clwyd, Ann Coffey, Rosie Cooper, Mary Creagh, Stella Creasy, Alex Cunningham, Simon Danczuk, Alistair Darling, Gloria De Piero, Brian Donohoe, Gemma Doyle, Angela Eagle, Julie Elliott, Louise Ellman, Chris Evans, Jim Fitzpatrick, Caroline Flint, Paul Flynn, Mike Gapes, Barry Gardiner, Pat Glass, Mary Glindon, Fabian Hamilton, David Hanson, Tom Harris, Mark Hendrick, Margaret Hodge, George Howarth, Tristram Hunt, Alan Johnson, Tessa Jowell, Gerald Kaufman, Liz Kendall, Ivan Lewis, Michael McCann, Gregg McClymont, Siobhain McDonagh, Pat McFadden, Anne McGuire, Ian Mearns, Alun Michael, Jessica Morden, Meg Munn, Jim Murphy, Ian Murray, Pamela Nash, Fiona O'Donnell, Toby Perkins, Bridget Phillipson, Yasmin Qureshi, Nick Raynsford, Jamie Reed, Jonathan Reynolds, Frank Roy, Chris Ruane, Anas Sarwar, Virendra Sharma, Barry Sheerman, Angela Smith, Nick Smith, Peter Soulsby, Graham Stringer, Mark Tami, Gareth Thomas, Valerie Vaz, Phil Wilson, John Woodcock, Shaun Woodward
- Ed Miliband (63): Adrian Bailey, Margaret Beckett, Anne Begg, Hilary Benn, Luciana Berger, Roberta Blackman-Woods, Paul Blomfield, Karen Buck, Margaret Curran, Wayne David, Geraint Davies, John Denham, Frank Dobson, Jack Dromey, Maria Eagle, Clive Efford, Natascha Engel, Bill Esterson, Frank Field, Hywel Francis, Helen Goodman, Tom Greatrex, Lilian Greenwood, Peter Hain, David Hamilton, Jimmy Hood, Graham Jones, Susan Jones, Sadiq Khan, Ian Lavery, Mark Lazarowicz, Andy Love, Ian Lucas, Shabana Mahmood, John Mann, Gordon Marsden, Jim McGovern, Ann McKechin, Catherine McKinnell, Michael Meacher, Alan Meale, Madeleine Moon, Grahame Morris, Paul Murphy, Lisa Nandy, Sandra Osborne, Albert Owen, Stephen Pound, Rachel Reeves, Emma Reynolds, Lindsay Roy, Joan Ruddock, Alison Seabeck, Jim Sheridan, Andy Slaughter, Owen Smith, Emily Thornberry, Stephen Timms, Chuka Umunna, Alan Whitehead, Christopher Williamson, Rosie Winterton
- Ed Balls (33): David Anderson, Ian Austin, Tom Blenkinsop, Kevin Brennan, Lyn Brown, Vernon Coaker, Yvette Cooper, David Crausby, Jim Cunningham, Jim Dobbin, Mike Dugher, Andrew Gwynne, John Healey, Stephen Hepburn, Sharon Hodgson, Diana Johnson, Helen Jones, Eric Joyce, Barbara Keeley, Chris Leslie, Khalid Mahmood, Steve McCabe, Kerry McCarthy, Teresa Pearce, John Robertson, Geoffrey Robinson, Marsha Singh, Andrew Smith, John Spellar, Tom Watson, David Wright, Iain Wright
- Andy Burnham (33): Heidi Alexander, Kevin Barron, Joe Benton, Clive Betts, Hazel Blears, David Blunkett, Tom Clarke, Michael Connarty, Nic Dakin, Thomas Docherty, Frank Doran, Paul Farrelly, Rob Flello, Yvonne Fovargue, Paul Goggins, Kate Green, Julie Hilling, Lindsay Hoyle, Huw Irranca-Davies, Cathy Jamieson, Kevan Jones, Alan Keen, Alison McGovern, Andrew Miller, Austin Mitchell, Steve Rotheram, Gerry Sutcliffe, Karl Turner, Derek Twigg, Joan Walley, Dave Watts, Malcolm Wicks
- Diane Abbott (33): Rushanara Ali, Chris Bryant, Ronnie Campbell, Katy Clark, Jeremy Corbyn, Jon Cruddas, John Cryer, Ian Davidson, Sheila Gilmore, Nia Griffith, Harriet Harman, Meg Hillier, Kate Hoey, Kelvin Hopkins, Sian James, David Lammy, Tony Lloyd, Denis MacShane, Fiona MacTaggart, John McDonnell, George Mudie, Chi Onwurah, Linda Riordan, Gavin Shuker, Dennis Skinner, Jack Straw, Jon Trickett, Stephen Twigg, Keith Vaz, Mike Wood, Phil Woolas

Before dropping out of the race on 9 June 2010, John McDonnell had the following 16 nominations: Ronnie Campbell, Martin Caton, Katy Clark, Jeremy Corbyn, John Cryer, Ian Davidson, Jim Dowd, Frank Field, Dai Havard, Kate Hoey, Ian Lavery, Graeme Morrice, Linda Riordan, Dennis Skinner, Mike Wood

=== Notable Labour politicians who declined to stand ===
Some members of parliament were seen as potential candidates but decided against running:

- Hazel Blears – former Communities and Local Government Secretary; supported Andy Burnham
- Yvette Cooper – Shadow Work and Pensions Secretary; supported her husband Ed Balls
- Jon Cruddas – backbencher who stood for Deputy Leader in 2007; he nominated Diane Abbott and supported David Miliband
- Alistair Darling – Shadow Chancellor of the Exchequer; supported David Miliband
- Peter Hain – Shadow Wales Secretary, previously Northern Ireland and Work and Pensions Secretary; supported Ed Miliband
- Harriet Harman – acting leader following Gordon Brown's departure, former Leader of the House of Commons; neutral but nominated Diane Abbott
- Alan Johnson – Shadow Home Secretary, previously Health Secretary and Education Secretary; supported David Miliband
- Jack Straw – Shadow Justice Secretary and Lord Chancellor, previously Foreign and Home Secretary; nominated Diane Abbott and supported David Miliband

== Televised debates ==
| Title | Date | Moderator | Channel | Information |
|---|---|---|---|---|
| Newsnight | Tuesday 15 June; 22:30 | Jeremy Paxman | BBC Two | As it happened: Newsnight Labour leader hustings |
| Channel 4 News | Wednesday 1 September; 19:00 | Jon Snow | Channel 4 | Labour leadership: live Channel 4 debate |
| Sky News | Sunday 5 September; 22:30 | Adam Boulton | Sky News | Labour Leader Debate: Submit Your Question |
| Question Time | Thursday 16 September; 22:35 | David Dimbleby | BBC One | Question Time Labour leadership special |

== Opinion polling ==
YouGov, 27–29 July 2010 1,102 eligible voters (Note: Labour Party members, MPs, MEPs, members of Socialist Societies and members of affiliated Trade Unions.)
| Candidate | Members | Affiliates (Note: Members of Socialist Societies and Trade Unions that are affiliated to the Labour Party.) | PLP | Total |
|---|---|---|---|---|
First Round
| David Miliband | 32% | 34% | 37% | 37% |
| Ed Miliband | 38% | 26% | 29% | 29% |
| Diane Abbott | 13% | 17% | 5% | 12% |
| Andy Burnham | 10% | 13% | 12% | 12% |
| Ed Balls | 7% | 11% | 11% | 11% |
Final Round
| David Miliband | 50% | 44% | 55% | 54% |
| Ed Miliband | 50% | 56% | 45% | 46% |

YouGov, 7–10 September 2010 1,011 eligible voters (Note: Labour Party members, MPs, MEPs, members of Socialist Societies and members of affiliated Trade Unions.)
| Candidate | Members | Affiliates (Note: Members of Socialist Societies and Trade Unions that are affiliated to the Labour Party.) | PLP | Total |
|---|---|---|---|---|
First Round
| David Miliband | 31% | 29% | 41% | 36% |
| Ed Miliband | 38% | 36% | 29% | 32% |
| Andy Burnham | 10% | 14% | 11% | 12% |
| Ed Balls | 9% | 9% | 14% | 11% |
| Diane Abbott | 11% | 12% | 4% | 9% |
Final Round
| Ed Miliband | 52% | 57% | 44% | 51% |
| David Miliband | 48% | 43% | 56% | 49% |

== Results ==
Each of the three electorates or sections contributed one third (33.33 per cent) of the total votes and were counted using the Alternative Vote system.

=== Overall result ===
First round
| Candidate | MPs/MEPs (33.3%) | | Labour Party members (33.3%) | | Affiliated members (33.3%) | | Overall result |
| Candidate | Votes | % | Votes | % | Votes | % | % |
|---|---|---|---|---|---|---|---|
| David Miliband | 111 | 41.7 | 55,905 | 44.1 | 58,189 | 27.5 | 37.8 |
| Ed Miliband | 84 | 31.6 | 37,980 | 29.9 | 87,585 | 41.5 | 34.3 |
| Ed Balls | 40 | 15.0 | 12,831 | 10.1 | 21,618 | 10.2 | 11.8 |
| Andy Burnham | 24 | 9.0 | 10,844 | 8.5 | 17,904 | 8.5 | 8.7 |
| Diane Abbott ✗ | 7 | 2.6 | 9,314 | 7.3 | 25,938 | 12.3 | 7.4 |

The combined total of first-round votes for Balls, Burnham, and Abbott (27.89%) was less than Ed Miliband's vote (34.33%). Thus, it was certain after the first round that Balls, Burnham, and Abbott would all be eliminated.

Second round
| Candidate | MPs/MEPs (33.3%) | | Labour Party members (33.3%) | | Affiliated members (33.3%) | | Overall result |
| Candidate | Votes | % | Votes | % | Votes | % | % |
|---|---|---|---|---|---|---|---|
| David Miliband | 111 | 42.0 | 57,128 | 45.2 | 61,336 | 29.4 | 38.9 |
| Ed Miliband | 88 | 33.3 | 42,176 | 33.4 | 95,335 | 45.7 | 37.5 |
| Ed Balls | 41 | 15.5 | 14,510 | 11.5 | 26,441 | 12.7 | 13.2 |
| Andy Burnham ✗ | 24 | 9.1 | 12,498 | 9.9 | 25,528 | 12.2 | 10.4 |

Third round
| Candidate | MPs/MEPs (33.3%) | | Labour Party members (33.3%) | | Affiliated members (33.3%) | | Overall result |
| Candidate | Votes | % | Votes | % | Votes | % | % |
|---|---|---|---|---|---|---|---|
| David Miliband | 125 | 47.3 | 60,375 | 48.2 | 66,889 | 32.6 | 42.7 |
| Ed Miliband | 96 | 36.4 | 46,697 | 37.3 | 102,882 | 50.1 | 41.3 |
| Ed Balls ✗ | 43 | 16.3 | 18,114 | 14.5 | 35,512 | 17.3 | 16.0 |

Fourth round
| Candidate | MPs/MEPs (33.3%) | | Labour Party members (33.3%) | | Affiliated members (33.3%) | | Overall result |
| Candidate | Votes | % | Votes | % | Votes | % | % |
|---|---|---|---|---|---|---|---|
| Ed Miliband ✓ | 122 | 46.6 | 55,992 | 45.6 | 119,405 | 59.8 | 50.7 |
| David Miliband | 140 | 53.4 | 66,814 | 54.4 | 80,266 | 40.2 | 49.3 |

Turnout in the members section was 71.7%, with 127,330 votes cast of the 177,558 ballots distributed. Amongst affiliated members, turnout was 9.0%, whilst amongst MPs/MEPs turnout was 98.5%.

=== Labour MPs and MEPs ===
| MP | First Choice | Second Choice | Third Choice | Fourth Choice | Fifth Choice |
|---|---|---|---|---|---|
| Diane Abbott | Diane Abbott | None | None | None | None |
| Bob Ainsworth | David Miliband | Ed Miliband | Andy Burnham | Ed Balls | Diane Abbott |
| Douglas Alexander | David Miliband | Ed Miliband | Ed Balls | Andy Burnham | Diane Abbott |
| Heidi Alexander | Andy Burnham | David Miliband | Ed Miliband | None | None |
| Rushanara Ali | David Miliband | Ed Miliband | Ed Balls | Andy Burnham | Diane Abbott |
| Graham Allen | David Miliband | Ed Miliband | None | None | None |
| Dave Anderson | Ed Balls | Ed Miliband | David Miliband | Andy Burnham | Diane Abbott |
| Ian Austin | Ed Balls | David Miliband | Andy Burnham | Ed Miliband | Diane Abbott |
| Adrian Bailey | Ed Miliband | David Miliband | Ed Balls | Andy Burnham | None |
| Willie Bain | David Miliband | Ed Miliband | Ed Balls | Andy Burnham | Diane Abbott |
| Ed Balls | Ed Balls | None | None | None | None |
| Gordon Banks | David Miliband | Ed Miliband | Ed Balls | Andy Burnham | None |
| Kevin Barron | Andy Burnham | Ed Miliband | David Miliband | Ed Balls | Diane Abbott |
| Hugh Bayley | David Miliband | Ed Miliband | Ed Balls | Andy Burnham | Diane Abbott |
| Margaret Beckett | Ed Miliband | None | None | None | None |
| Anne Begg | Ed Miliband | David Miliband | Ed Balls | Andy Burnham | Diane Abbott |
| Stuart Bell | David Miliband | Ed Balls | None | None | None |
| Hilary Benn | Ed Miliband | David Miliband | None | None | None |
| Joe Benton | Andy Burnham | David Miliband | Ed Miliband | Ed Balls | None |
| Luciana Berger | Ed Miliband | David Miliband | Ed Balls | Andy Burnham | Diane Abbott |
| Clive Betts | Andy Burnham | Ed Miliband | None | None | None |
| Roberta Blackman-Woods | Ed Miliband | Andy Burnham | None | None | None |
| Hazel Blears | Andy Burnham | David Miliband | Ed Balls | Ed Miliband | None |
| Tom Blenkinsop | Ed Balls | David Miliband | None | None | None |
| Paul Blomfield | Ed Miliband | None | None | None | None |
| David Blunkett | Andy Burnham | David Miliband | None | None | None |
| Ben Bradshaw | David Miliband | None | None | None | None |
| Kevin Brennan | Ed Balls | David Miliband | Ed Miliband | Andy Burnham | Diane Abbott |
| Gordon Brown | None | None | None | None | None |
| Lyn Brown | Ed Balls | David Miliband | Ed Miliband | None | None |
| Russell Brown | David Miliband | Ed Miliband | Ed Balls | Andy Burnham | None |
| Chris Bryant | David Miliband | Ed Balls | Andy Burnham | Ed Miliband | Diane Abbott |
| Karen Buck | Ed Miliband | None | None | None | None |
| Richard Burden | David Miliband | Ed Miliband | Ed Balls | None | None |
| Andy Burnham | Andy Burnham | David Miliband | Ed Miliband | Ed Balls | Diane Abbott |
| Liam Byrne | David Miliband | Ed Balls | None | None | None |
| David Cairns | David Miliband | None | None | None | None |
| Alan Campbell | David Miliband | Andy Burnham | None | None | None |
| Ronnie Campbell | Andy Burnham | Ed Miliband | None | None | None |
| Michael Cashman MEP | David Miliband | Ed Miliband | None | None | None |
| Martin Caton | Ed Miliband | Diane Abbott | Ed Balls | None | None |
| Jenny Chapman | David Miliband | None | None | None | None |
| Katy Clark | Diane Abbott | Ed Balls | Ed Miliband | Andy Burnham | David Miliband |
| Tom Clarke | David Miliband | Andy Burnham | Diane Abbott | Ed Miliband | Ed Balls |
| Ann Clwyd | David Miliband | None | None | None | None |
| Vernon Coaker | Ed Balls | David Miliband | Ed Miliband | Andy Burnham | None |
| Ann Coffey | David Miliband | Ed Miliband | Andy Burnham | Ed Balls | Diane Abbott |
| Michael Connarty | Andy Burnham | Ed Balls | Ed Miliband | David Miliband | Diane Abbott |
| Rosie Cooper | David Miliband | Ed Balls | None | None | None |
| Yvette Cooper | Ed Balls | None | None | None | None |
| Jeremy Corbyn | Diane Abbott | Ed Miliband | None | None | None |
| David Crausby | Ed Balls | David Miliband | Ed Miliband | Andy Burnham | Diane Abbott |
| Mary Creagh | David Miliband | Ed Balls | Ed Miliband | Andy Burnham | Diane Abbott |
| Stella Creasy | David Miliband | Ed Miliband | None | None | None |
| Jon Cruddas | David Miliband | Ed Balls | Ed Miliband | Diane Abbott | Andy Burnham |
| John Cryer | Ed Miliband | Ed Balls | David Miliband | Andy Burnham | Diane Abbott |
| Alex Cunningham | David Miliband | Ed Miliband | Ed Balls | Andy Burnham | Diane Abbott |
| Jim Cunningham | Ed Balls | David Miliband | Ed Miliband | Andy Burnham | Diane Abbott |
| Tony Cunningham | Ed Balls | Ed Miliband | David Miliband | Andy Burnham | None |
| Margaret Curran | Ed Miliband | David Miliband | Andy Burnham | Ed Balls | Diane Abbott |
| Nic Dakin | David Miliband | Ed Miliband | Ed Balls | Andy Burnham | Diane Abbott |
| Simon Danczuk | David Miliband | None | None | None | None |
| Alistair Darling | David Miliband | None | None | None | None |
| Wayne David | Ed Miliband | David Miliband | Ed Balls | Andy Burnham | Diane Abbott |
| Ian Davidson | Ed Balls | Ed Miliband | David Miliband | Andy Burnham | Diane Abbott |
| Geraint Davies | Ed Miliband | David Miliband | Ed Balls | None | None |
| Gloria De Piero | David Miliband | Ed Miliband | None | None | None |
| John Denham | Ed Miliband | None | None | None | None |
| Jim Dobbin | Ed Balls | Ed Miliband | None | None | None |
| Frank Dobson | Ed Miliband | Ed Balls | None | None | None |
| Thomas Docherty | Andy Burnham | David Miliband | Ed Miliband | Ed Balls | Diane Abbott |
| Brian Donohoe | David Miliband | Ed Miliband | Ed Balls | Andy Burnham | Diane Abbott |
| Frank Doran | Ed Miliband | David Miliband | Ed Balls | Andy Burnham | None |
| Jim Dowd | David Miliband | None | None | None | None |
| Gemma Doyle | David Miliband | Ed Miliband | Ed Balls | Diane Abbott | Andy Burnham |
| Jack Dromey | Ed Miliband | None | None | None | None |
| Michael Dugher | Ed Balls | Ed Miliband | None | None | None |
| Angela Eagle | David Miliband | Ed Balls | Ed Miliband | Andy Burnham | Diane Abbott |
| Maria Eagle | Ed Miliband | None | None | None | None |
| Clive Efford | Ed Miliband | David Miliband | Ed Balls | Andy Burnham | Diane Abbott |
| Julie Elliott | David Miliband | Andy Burnham | Ed Miliband | None | None |
| Louise Ellman | David Miliband | Andy Burnham | None | None | None |
| Natascha Engel | Ed Miliband | None | None | None | None |
| Bill Esterson | Ed Miliband | Andy Burnham | David Miliband | Ed Balls | Diane Abbott |
| Chris Evans | Ed Balls | David Miliband | Ed Miliband | Andy Burnham | None |
| Paul Farrelly | Ed Miliband | David Miliband | Andy Burnham | Ed Balls | Diane Abbott |
| Frank Field | Ed Miliband | Andy Burnham | None | None | None |
| Jim Fitzpatrick | David Miliband | None | None | None | None |
| Rob Flello | Andy Burnham | David Miliband | Ed Miliband | None | None |
| Caroline Flint | David Miliband | None | None | None | None |
| Paul Flynn | David Miliband | Andy Burnham | Diane Abbott | Ed Balls | Ed Miliband |
| Yvonne Fovargue | Andy Burnham | David Miliband | None | None | None |
| Hywel Francis | Ed Miliband | Ed Balls | None | None | None |
| Mike Gapes | David Miliband | Andy Burnham | Ed Balls | Ed Miliband | Diane Abbott |
| Barry Gardiner | David Miliband | Ed Miliband | None | None | None |
| Sheila Gilmore | David Miliband | Ed Miliband | Andy Burnham | Diane Abbott | Ed Balls |
| Pat Glass | David Miliband | Ed Balls | Andy Burnham | Ed Miliband | Diane Abbott |
| Mary Glindon | David Miliband | Andy Burnham | Ed Miliband | Ed Balls | Diane Abbott |
| Roger Godsiff | Ed Miliband | David Miliband | Andy Burnham | Ed Balls | Diane Abbott |
| Paul Goggins | Andy Burnham | David Miliband | None | None | None |
| Helen Goodman | Ed Miliband | None | None | None | None |
| Tom Greatrex | Ed Miliband | David Miliband | Andy Burnham | Ed Balls | None |
| Kate Green | Ed Balls | Ed Miliband | Andy Burnham | David Miliband | Diane Abbott |
| Lilian Greenwood | Ed Miliband | David Miliband | Ed Balls | Andy Burnham | Diane Abbott |
| Nia Griffith | Ed Balls | Ed Miliband | David Miliband | None | None |
| Andrew Gwynne | Ed Balls | Ed Miliband | David Miliband | Andy Burnham | Diane Abbott |
| Peter Hain | Ed Miliband | David Miliband | None | None | None |
| David Hamilton | Ed Miliband | Ed Balls | Andy Burnham | David Miliband | None |
| Fabian Hamilton | David Miliband | Ed Miliband | Andy Burnham | Ed Balls | None |
| David Hanson | David Miliband | Andy Burnham | Ed Miliband | Ed Balls | Diane Abbott |
| Harriet Harman | None | None | None | None | None |
| Tom Harris | David Miliband | None | None | None | None |
| Dai Havard | Ed Miliband | Ed Balls | None | None | None |
| John Healey | Ed Balls | Ed Miliband | None | None | None |
| Mark Hendrick | David Miliband | Ed Miliband | Andy Burnham | Ed Balls | Diane Abbott |
| Stephen Hepburn | Ed Balls | David Miliband | None | None | None |
| David Heyes | Andy Burnham | Ed Miliband | David Miliband | Ed Balls | Diane Abbott |
| Meg Hillier | David Miliband | Ed Balls | Andy Burnham | None | None |
| Julie Hilling | Andy Burnham | David Miliband | Ed Miliband | Ed Balls | Diane Abbott |
| Margaret Hodge | David Miliband | None | None | None | None |
| Sharon Hodgson | Ed Balls | Andy Burnham | Ed Miliband | David Miliband | Diane Abbott |
| Kate Hoey | Andy Burnham | Ed Miliband | David Miliband | None | None |
| Mary Honeyball MEP | David Miliband | Ed Miliband | Ed Balls | Andy Burnham | Diane Abbott |
| Jimmy Hood | Ed Miliband | Ed Balls | David Miliband | Andy Burnham | Diane Abbott |
| Kelvin Hopkins | Diane Abbott | Ed Miliband | Ed Balls | Andy Burnham | David Miliband |
| George Howarth | David Miliband | Ed Balls | None | None | None |
| Richard Howitt MEP | David Miliband | Ed Miliband | None | None | None |
| Lindsay Hoyle | Ed Balls | Ed Miliband | David Miliband | None | None |
| Stephen Hughes | Ed Miliband | David Miliband | Andy Burnham | None | None |
| Tristram Hunt | David Miliband | Ed Balls | Ed Miliband | Andy Burnham | Diane Abbott |
| Huw Irranca-Davies | David Miliband | Andy Burnham | Ed Miliband | Ed Balls | None |
| Glenda Jackson | Ed Miliband | Ed Balls | None | None | None |
| Siân James | Ed Miliband | Ed Balls | None | None | None |
| Cathy Jamieson | Ed Miliband | Andy Burnham | David Miliband | Ed Balls | Diane Abbott |
| Alan Johnson | David Miliband | None | None | None | None |
| Diana Johnson | Ed Balls | David Miliband | None | None | None |
| Graham Jones | Ed Miliband | Ed Balls | Andy Burnham | David Miliband | None |
| Helen Jones | Ed Balls | Ed Miliband | David Miliband | None | None |
| Kevan Jones | David Miliband | Andy Burnham | None | None | None |
| Susan Elan Jones | Ed Miliband | David Miliband | None | None | None |
| Tessa Jowell | David Miliband | Andy Burnham | Ed Miliband | Diane Abbott | Ed Balls |
| Eric Joyce | Ed Balls | Ed Miliband | Andy Burnham | David Miliband | Diane Abbott |
| Gerald Kaufman | David Miliband | Ed Miliband | Andy Burnham | Ed Balls | None |
| Barbara Keeley | Ed Balls | Ed Miliband | David Miliband | Andy Burnham | Diane Abbott |
| Alan Keen | Andy Burnham | Ed Miliband | David Miliband | Ed Balls | Diane Abbott |
| Liz Kendall | David Miliband | None | None | None | None |
| Sadiq Khan | Ed Miliband | None | None | None | None |
| David Lammy | David Miliband | Diane Abbott | Ed Balls | Ed Miliband | Andy Burnham |
| Ian Lavery | Ed Miliband | Andy Burnham | None | None | None |
| Mark Lazarowicz | Ed Miliband | None | None | None | None |
| Chris Leslie | Ed Balls | David Miliband | Ed Miliband | Andy Burnham | Diane Abbott |
| Ivan Lewis | David Miliband | None | None | None | None |
| Tony Lloyd | None | None | None | None | None |
| Andy Love | Ed Miliband | David Miliband | Ed Balls | Andy Burnham | Diane Abbott |
| Ian Lucas | Ed Miliband | Ed Balls | David Miliband | Andy Burnham | Diane Abbott |
| Denis MacShane | David Miliband | None | None | None | None |
| Fiona Mactaggart | David Miliband | Ed Balls | None | None | None |
| Khalid Mahmood | Ed Balls | Ed Miliband | Diane Abbott | David Miliband | Andy Burnham |
| Shabana Mahmood | Ed Miliband | None | None | None | None |
| John Mann | David Miliband | Ed Miliband | None | None | None |
| Gordon Marsden | Ed Miliband | David Miliband | Andy Burnham | Ed Balls | None |
| David Martin MEP | David Miliband | None | None | None | None |
| Linda McAvan MEP | Ed Miliband | None | None | None | None |
| Steve McCabe | Ed Balls | Ed Miliband | David Miliband | None | None |
| Michael McCann | David Miliband | None | None | None | None |
| Arlene McCarthy MEP | Ed Miliband | David Miliband | Andy Burnham | None | None |
| Kerry McCarthy | Ed Balls | David Miliband | None | None | None |
| Gregg McClymont | David Miliband | Ed Miliband | Ed Balls | Andy Burnham | Diane Abbott |
| Siobhain McDonagh | David Miliband | None | None | None | None |
| John McDonnell | Diane Abbott | None | None | None | None |
| Pat McFadden | David Miliband | None | None | None | None |
| Alison McGovern | David Miliband | Andy Burnham | Ed Miliband | Ed Balls | Diane Abbott |
| Jim McGovern | Ed Miliband | None | None | None | None |
| Anne McGuire | David Miliband | Ed Balls | Ed Miliband | Andy Burnham | Diane Abbott |
| Ann McKechin | Ed Miliband | Ed Balls | None | None | None |
| Catherine McKinnell | Ed Miliband | None | None | None | None |
| Michael Meacher | Ed Miliband | Diane Abbott | None | None | None |
| Alan Meale | Ed Miliband | David Miliband | Ed Balls | Andy Burnham | Diane Abbott |
| Ian Mearns | David Miliband | Ed Balls | Ed Miliband | Andy Burnham | Diane Abbott |
| Alun Michael | David Miliband | Ed Balls | Ed Miliband | Andy Burnham | Diane Abbott |
| David Miliband | David Miliband | Ed Miliband | None | None | None |
| Ed Miliband | Ed Miliband | David Miliband | None | None | None |
| Andrew Miller | Andy Burnham | David Miliband | Ed Miliband | Ed Balls | None |
| Austin Mitchell | Ed Miliband | David Miliband | Ed Balls | Diane Abbott | Andy Burnham |
| Madeleine Moon | Ed Miliband | Ed Balls | None | None | None |
| Claude Moraes MEP | David Miliband | None | None | None | None |
| Jessica Morden | David Miliband | Ed Miliband | Andy Burnham | Ed Balls | Diane Abbott |
| Graeme Morrice | Ed Miliband | None | None | None | None |
| Grahame Morris | Ed Miliband | Andy Burnham | Ed Balls | Diane Abbott | David Miliband |
| George Mudie | Ed Balls | Ed Miliband | None | None | None |
| Meg Munn | David Miliband | None | None | None | None |
| Jim Murphy | David Miliband | None | None | None | None |
| Paul Murphy | Ed Miliband | David Miliband | None | None | None |
| Ian Murray | David Miliband | Ed Miliband | Ed Balls | Andy Burnham | Diane Abbott |
| Lisa Nandy | Ed Miliband | Ed Balls | None | None | None |
| Pamela Nash | David Miliband | None | None | None | None |
| Fiona O'Donnell | David Miliband | Ed Miliband | Andy Burnham | Ed Balls | Diane Abbott |
| Chi Onwurah | Ed Miliband | David Miliband | Diane Abbott | None | None |
| Sandra Osborne | Ed Miliband | None | None | None | None |
| Albert Owen | Ed Miliband | Andy Burnham | David Miliband | Ed Balls | None |
| Teresa Pearce | Ed Balls | Ed Miliband | David Miliband | None | None |
| Toby Perkins | David Miliband | Ed Balls | Ed Miliband | Andy Burnham | Diane Abbott |
| Bridget Phillipson | David Miliband | None | None | None | None |
| Stephen Pound | Ed Miliband | Andy Burnham | David Miliband | Ed Balls | None |
| Dawn Primarolo | Ed Miliband | None | None | None | None |
| Yasmin Qureshi | David Miliband | None | None | None | None |
| Nick Raynsford | David Miliband | None | None | None | None |
| Jamie Reed | David Miliband | Ed Miliband | Andy Burnham | Ed Balls | None |
| Rachel Reeves | Ed Miliband | David Miliband | Ed Balls | Andy Burnham | Diane Abbott |
| Emma Reynolds | Ed Miliband | David Miliband | Ed Balls | Andy Burnham | Diane Abbott |
| Jonathan Reynolds | David Miliband | Ed Miliband | None | None | None |
| Linda Riordan | Diane Abbott | Ed Miliband | None | None | None |
| John Robertson | Ed Balls | Ed Miliband | David Miliband | Andy Burnham | Diane Abbott |
| Geoffrey Robinson | Ed Balls | David Miliband | Ed Miliband | Andy Burnham | Diane Abbott |
| Steve Rotheram | Andy Burnham | Ed Miliband | None | None | None |
| Frank Roy | David Miliband | None | None | None | None |
| Lindsay Roy | Ed Miliband | Ed Balls | David Miliband | None | None |
| Chris Ruane | David Miliband | Ed Miliband | Ed Balls | Andy Burnham | Diane Abbott |
| Joan Ruddock | Ed Miliband | None | None | None | None |
| Anas Sarwar | David Miliband | Ed Miliband | None | None | None |
| Alison Seabeck | Ed Miliband | None | None | None | None |
| Virendra Sharma | David Miliband | Ed Miliband | Ed Balls | Andy Burnham | Diane Abbott |
| Barry Sheerman | David Miliband | None | None | None | None |
| Jim Sheridan | Ed Miliband | None | None | None | None |
| Gavin Shuker | Ed Miliband | Ed Balls | None | None | None |
| Brian Simpson MEP | Andy Burnham | Ed Miliband | None | None | None |
| Marsha Singh | Ed Miliband | David Miliband | Ed Balls | None | None |
| Dennis Skinner | David Miliband | None | None | None | None |
| Peter Skinner MEP | David Miliband | None | None | None | None |
| Andy Slaughter | Ed Miliband | None | None | None | None |
| Andrew Smith | Ed Balls | David Miliband | Ed Miliband | Andy Burnham | None |
| Angela Smith | David Miliband | Andy Burnham | None | None | None |
| Nick Smith | David Miliband | Ed Balls | Ed Miliband | Andy Burnham | Diane Abbott |
| Owen Smith | Ed Miliband | Ed Balls | David Miliband | Andy Burnham | Diane Abbott |
| Peter Soulsby | David Miliband | Ed Miliband | Andy Burnham | Ed Balls | Diane Abbott |
| John Spellar | Ed Balls | David Miliband | Ed Miliband | Andy Burnham | None |
| Catherine Stihler MEP | Ed Miliband | David Miliband | Andy Burnham | Ed Balls | Diane Abbott |
| Jack Straw | David Miliband | Andy Burnham | Ed Balls | None | None |
| Graham Stringer | David Miliband | Andy Burnham | None | None | None |
| Gisela Stuart | David Miliband | None | None | None | None |
| Gerry Sutcliffe | Andy Burnham | David Miliband | Ed Balls | Ed Miliband | Diane Abbott |
| Mark Tami | David Miliband | Ed Balls | Andy Burnham | Ed Balls | Diane Abbott |
| Gareth Thomas | David Miliband | None | None | None | None |
| Emily Thornberry | Ed Miliband | None | None | None | None |
| Stephen Timms | Ed Miliband | David Miliband | Andy Burnham | Ed Balls | None |
| Jon Trickett | Ed Balls | Ed Miliband | David Miliband | Diane Abbott | None |
| Karl Turner | Andy Burnham | David Miliband | Ed Miliband | Ed Balls | Diane Abbott |
| Derek Twigg | Andy Burnham | David Miliband | Ed Balls | Ed Miliband | Diane Abbott |
| Stephen Twigg | David Miliband | Ed Miliband | None | None | None |
| Chuka Umunna | Ed Miliband | David Miliband | None | None | None |
| Derek Vaughan MEP | Ed Miliband | David Miliband | None | None | None |
| Keith Vaz | David Miliband | Ed Miliband | Ed Balls | Diane Abbott | Andy Burnham |
| Valerie Vaz | David Miliband | Diane Abbott | Ed Miliband | None | None |
| Joan Walley | Ed Miliband | Andy Burnham | None | None | None |
| Tom Watson | Ed Balls | Ed Miliband | Andy Burnham | David Miliband | Diane Abbott |
| Dave Watts | Andy Burnham | Ed Balls | Ed Miliband | Diane Abbott | David Miliband |
| Alan Whitehead | Ed Miliband | Andy Burnham | David Miliband | None | None |
| Malcolm Wicks | David Miliband | Ed Miliband | Andy Burnham | Ed Balls | Diane Abbott |
| Chris Williamson | Ed Miliband | Ed Balls | David Miliband | Andy Burnham | Diane Abbott |
| Glenis Willmott MEP | Ed Miliband | David Miliband | None | None | None |
| Phil Wilson | David Miliband | Andy Burnham | None | None | None |
| David Winnick | David Miliband | None | None | None | None |
| Rosie Winterton | Ed Miliband | None | None | None | None |
| Mike Wood | Diane Abbott | Ed Miliband | Ed Balls | None | None |
| John Woodcock | David Miliband | Andy Burnham | Ed Miliband | Ed Balls | None |
| Shaun Woodward | David Miliband | Ed Miliband | Ed Balls | Andy Burnham | Diane Abbott |
| Phil Woolas | David Miliband | None | None | None | None |
| David Wright | Ed Balls | David Miliband | Ed Miliband | Andy Burnham | None |
| Iain Wright | Ed Balls | Ed Miliband | Andy Burnham | David Miliband | Diane Abbott |

=== Constituency Labour Parties ===
The map below shows the results of the Constituency Labour Parties' first round preferences in the leadership election by constituency, before votes were transferred due to eliminations. David Miliband took the most constituencies, winning 577 in total. He was followed by Ed Miliband who took sixty-seven constituencies. Andy Burnham won eight seats, all in north-west England, Ed Balls took two constituencies (his own, Morley & Outwood, and that of his wife, Yvette Cooper, Normanton, Pontefract and Castleford), and Diane Abbott won no constituencies. All ties with the exception of Wigan (Burnham and David Miliband) were between David and Ed Miliband. Northern Ireland was counted as one constituency.

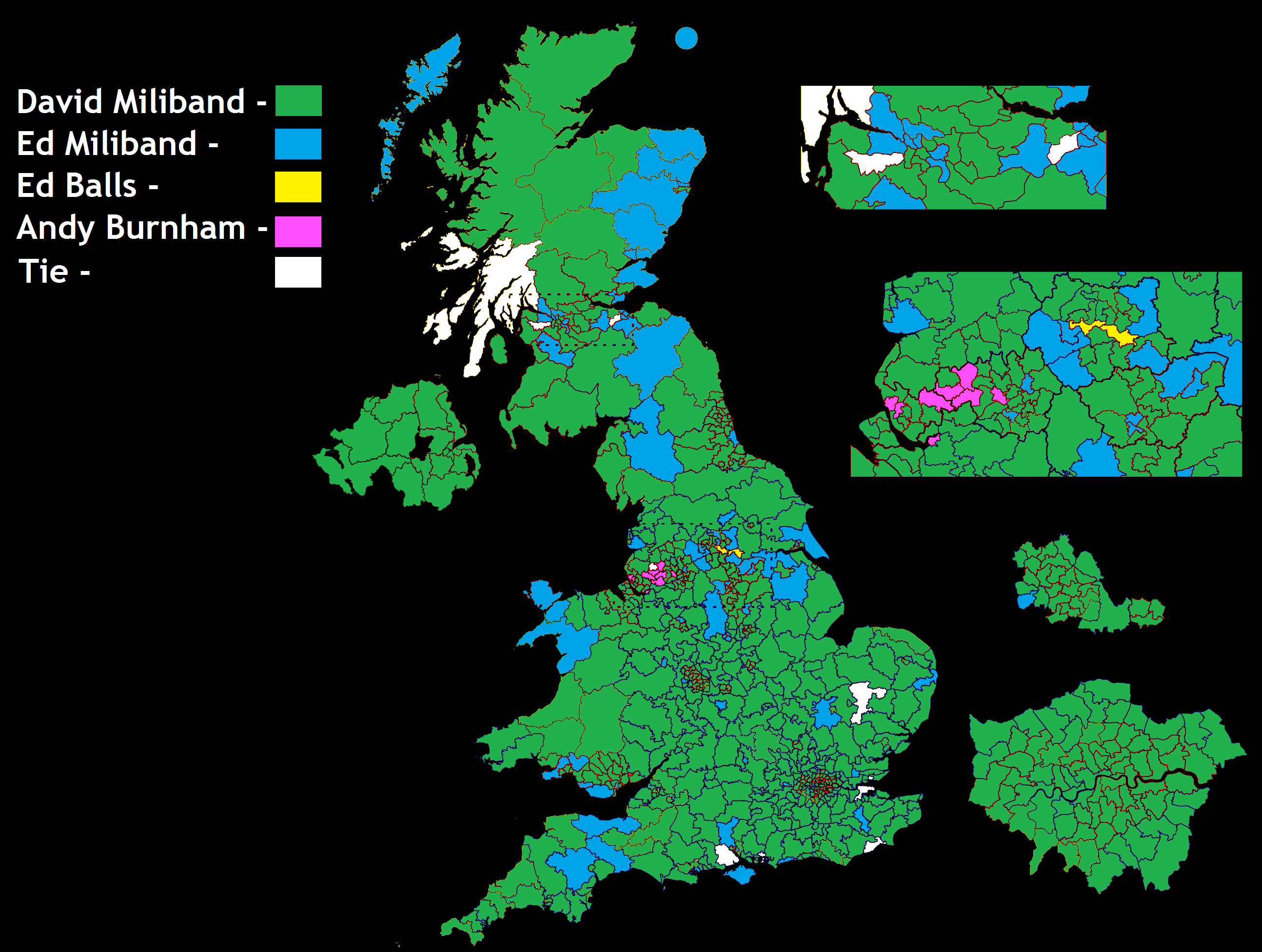
Green indicates constituencies won by David Miliband, light blue for Ed Miliband, pink for Andy Burnham, yellow for Ed Balls and white for a tie. (Click to enlarge)

=== Trade Unions and Socialist Societies ===
| Name | Diane Abbott | Ed Balls | Andy Burnham | David Miliband | Ed Miliband |
|---|---|---|---|---|---|
| ASLEF | 1,791 | 228 | 246 | 626 | 665 |
| BECTU | 588 | 194 | 210 | 715 | 697 |
| BFAWU | 178 | 152 | 154 | 484 | 231 |
| Community | 205 | 184 | 151 | 1,292 | 332 |
| CWU | 1,786 | 7,101 | 1,417 | 3,370 | 2,047 |
| GMB | 3,213 | 2,548 | 3,119 | 9,746 | 18,128 |
| Musicians' Union | 925 | 221 | 210 | 805 | 865 |
| TSSA | 898 | 285 | 296 | 923 | 544 |
| UCATT | 177 | 185 | 229 | 630 | 2,471 |
| UNISON | 2,910 | 2,141 | 2,343 | 6,665 | 9,652 |
| Unite the Union | 11,129 | 6,995 | 7,993 | 21,778 | 47,439 |
| USDAW | 1,279 | 788 | 881 | 8,264 | 1,661 |
| BAME Labour | 20 | 4 | 2 | 200 | 29 |
| CSM | 79 | 57 | 80 | 194 | 279 |
| Fabian Society | 308 | 313 | 281 | 1,461 | 1,321 |
| LHG | 16 | 15 | 16 | 33 | 41 |
| LPDMG | 5 | 4 | 2 | 11 | 20 |
| Irish Society | 11 | 5 | 2 | 20 | 16 |
| Labour Students | 117 | 86 | 116 | 402 | 379 |
| LGBT Labour | 55 | 17 | 29 | 193 | 136 |
| Scientists for Labour | 9 | 5 | 10 | 21 | 24 |
| SERA | 77 | 22 | 32 | 86 | 209 |
| SEA | 57 | 28 | 28 | 63 | 138 |
| SHA | 75 | 26 | 36 | 87 | 172 |
| Labour Lawyers | 25 | 14 | 15 | 83 | 66 |
| Jewish Labour | 5 | 0 | 6 | 37 | 24 |

Turnout in the affiliates section was 9.0%, with 247,339 votes cast of the 2,747,030 ballots distributed.

== See also ==
- 2007 Labour Party leadership election (UK)
- 2007 Labour Party deputy leadership election
