= 2026 Labour Party leadership election =

Election to replace Keir Starmer

- 9–16 July 2026
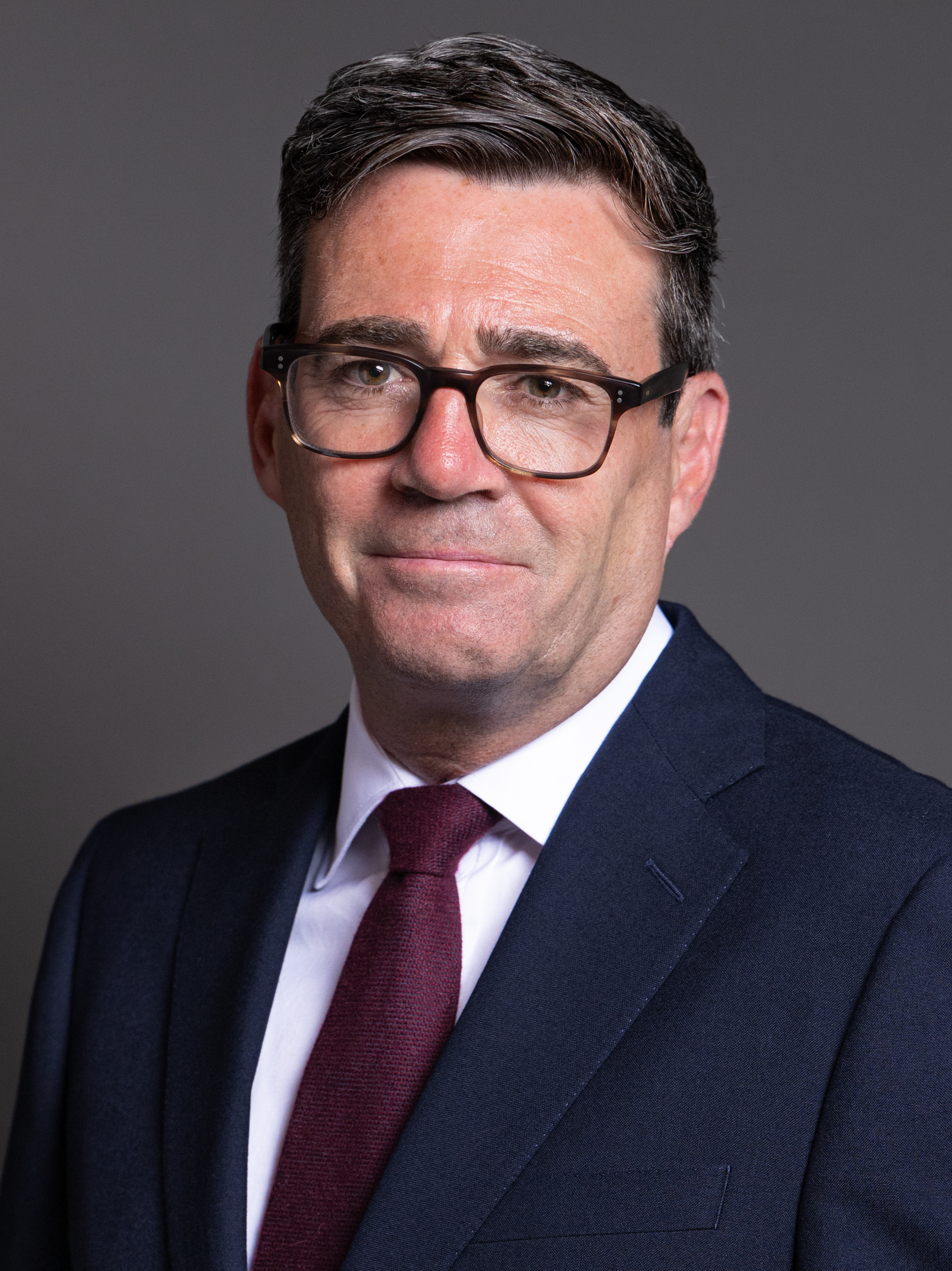
Candidate	Andy Burnham
Popular vote	Unopposed
Leader before election
Keir Starmer
Elected Leader
Andy Burnham

The 2026 Labour Party leadership election was triggered by Keir Starmer's 22 June 2026 announcement that, due to the lack of confidence in his leadership by his MPs, he intended to resign as Leader of the Labour Party and Prime Minister of the United Kingdom.

Andy Burnham, a minister under Tony Blair and Gordon Brown who had been the mayor of Greater Manchester and previously ran for the Labour leadership in 2010 and 2015, had been tipped since 2025 as a potential leadership challenger to Starmer, but Labour rules dictate that only MPs can stand for the leadership. Burnham was blocked from standing in the 2026 Gorton and Denton by-election (held on 26 February) by the party's National Executive Committee. However he stood and won the 2026 Makerfield by-election on 18 June after the constituency's MP, Josh Simons, resigned to allow Burnham to stand. Burnham's by-election victory intensified discussion of a leadership challenge; Starmer announced his resignation four days after the by-election, on the same day that Burnham was sworn in as an MP.

Nominations from MPs opened on 9 July and closed on 16 July. With 379 nominations, Burnham was the only eligible candidate when nominations closed, as he was nominated by over 94% of all Labour MPs, exceeding Gordon Brown's 88% of nominations in 2007. He was acclaimed as Leader of the Labour Party on 17 July 2026, and became Prime Minister three days later, on 20 July 2026. Burnham became the first Labour prime minister who is also a member of the Co-operative Party.

== Background ==
=== Starmer leadership and premiership ===
Approval ratings of Keir Starmer as Prime Minister

Keir Starmer was elected Labour leader by winning the 2020 leadership election. His party made significant gains at the 2023 and 2024 local elections amidst a significant drop in membership in the years prior. Starmer became the fifth Labour leader to become prime minister after a general election but with the smallest share of the electoral vote of any majority government since records began in 1830.

Starmer's net approval rating began slightly positive but fell over the course of his premiership to an average of −46% by November 2025. Starmer also presided over a period of low support for Labour, with the party facing record electoral losses during the 2025 local elections. In January 2026, Andy Burnham, who had been speculated since 2025 to be planning to enter Parliament to challenge Starmer's leadership, attempted to stand to be the Labour Party candidate in the Gorton and Denton by-election but was blocked from standing by the party's National Executive Committee. In February, Anas Sarwar, the Leader of the Scottish Labour Party, called for Starmer to resign as party leader amid the Peter Mandelson appointment scandal.

=== 2026 local elections ===
In the May 2026 UK local elections, the Labour Party lost control of over half of the councils up for election. Labour also lost over 1,400 councillors, which BBC News reported as the single largest loss of councillors Labour had had in a single local election. Reform UK and the Green Party made their highest gains ever.

At the same time, Labour suffered a historic defeat in the 2026 Senedd election, failing to win either an outright majority or plurality in the Senedd for the first time in its history, losing to Plaid Cymru. In the 2026 Scottish Parliament election as well, the Labour Party failed to make expected gains, coming in joint-second with Reform UK in terms of MSPs.

On 9 May, Labour MP Catherine West issued an ultimatum for a leadership challenger to Starmer to step forward by 11 May or that West would put herself forward as a candidate. West said her preferred option was that someone already in the cabinet become leader, with Starmer "given a different role". That same day, around Labour 30 MPs had either directly called for Keir Starmer to resign, or for him to set out a timetable on his departure. On 11 May, no candidate had been put forward, and West refused herself to stand as a challenger.

By 11 May's evening, 70 MPs had called for Starmer to resign. On 13 May, allies of Health Secretary Wes Streeting told BBC News that they expected him to resign and launch a leadership bid as soon as tomorrow. A spokesperson for Streeting stated that he would not do anything to "distract" from the State Opening of Parliament. In a meeting with MPs later in the evening, Starmer vowed to fight a leadership challenge if the health secretary ran. Cabinet ministers loyal to Starmer attempted to convince colleagues that a change in leadership would paralyse the government and cause chaos.

On 13 May, Starmer said to The Observer that he wanted to be in office for ten years and would stand in a possible leadership contest. Starmer's position rapidly deteriorated on 14 May. Former Deputy Prime Minister Angela Rayner was cleared by the HM Revenue and Customs over her tax scandal, which was viewed as paving the way for her to join a leadership race. Streeting announced his resignation at 1:00pm GMT, stating that he had lost confidence in Starmer's government. Al Carns was reported by Sky News to be interested in a leadership challenge.

=== Return of Burnham to Parliament ===
On 14 May, Josh Simons, the Labour member for Makerfield, resigned his seat in parliament, paving the way for Burnham to contest the by-election and so to stand for the Labour leadership, in accordance with party rules that require any candidate for leader to be a member of the Parliamentary Labour Party. Whilst Burnham had previously been blocked from standing in the 2026 Gorton and Denton by-election in February 2026 by the National Executive Committee of the Labour Party (NEC), they did not block his candidacy for the Makerfield by-election.

On 16 May, Wes Streeting stated he would stand in a leadership election, should there be one, but that he only supported having a "proper contest" to give Burnham time to return to Parliament and be eligible to stand, thus delaying any leadership contest until June.

The 2026 Makerfield by-election was held on 18 June, with Burnham exceeding expectations to win the by-election with a large majority of over 9,000 votes. Burnham gained the support of over 200 Labour MPs by 20 June. The Guardian reported on 20 June that a Burnham leadership campaign was inevitable and that his allies were confident that Burnham would be elected uncontested, though some Labour MPs still wanted a contested leadership race.

Starmer announced his intention to resign on 22 June 2026, four days after the by-election.

== Timeline ==
- 22 June – Sir Keir Starmer announces his resignation as Leader of the Labour Party
- 9 July – PLP nominations open
- 15 July – PLP nominations close and affiliate nominations open
- 16 July – Affiliate nominations close
- 17 July – Result announced at Special Conference
- 20 July – Sir Keir Starmer resigns as Prime Minister. Andy Burnham is asked by King Charles III to form a new government.

== Candidates ==
Under the Labour Party's rules, for a leadership contender to be on the ballot, they must be nominated by at least 20% of the Parliamentary Labour Party, meaning 81 MPs would be required.

Burnham was the first to announce his candidacy for the leadership contest after Starmer's resignation announcement, stating he "will put [himself] forward as part of this process." Wes Streeting and Al Carns, who were both seen as potential candidates, endorsed Burnham.

While not formally putting herself forward for the leadership position, Catherine West, the MP for Hornsey and Friern Barnet, was nominated by Neil Coyle after nominations had opened. This occurred after it was already mathematically impossible for a candidate other than Burnham to reach the required level of 81 MPs.

=== Nominated ===
Candidate	Born	Political office	Announced	Nominated
Andy Burnham	7 January 1970; Aintree, Lancashire	MP for Makerfield (2026–present); Mayor of Greater Manchester (2017–2026); MP for Leigh (2001–2017); Secretary of State for Health (2009–2010); Secretary of State for Culture, Media and Sport (2008–2009); Chief Secretary to the Treasury (2007–2008)	22 June 2026	9 July 2026

=== Eliminated ===
Candidate	Born	Political office	Announced	Eliminated
Catherine West	14 September 1966; Mansfield, Victoria, Australia	MP for Hornsey and Friern Barnet (2015–present); Parliamentary Under-Secretary of State for Indo-Pacific (2024–2025)	N/A (Note: West did not launch a leadership bid and nominated Andy Burnham herself; she was nominated by one MP without her consent.)	15 July 2026

=== Declined ===
- Al Carns, former Parliamentary Under-Secretary of State for the Armed Forces (2025–2026) (endorsed Burnham)
- Darren Jones, Chancellor of the Duchy of Lancaster (2025–2026) (endorsed Burnham)
- David Lammy, Deputy Prime Minister of the United Kingdom (2025–2026) (endorsed Burnham)
- Wes Streeting, former Secretary of State for Health and Social Care (2024–2026) (endorsed Burnham)

== Endorsements ==
=== Andy Burnham ===
List of MPs who endorsed Andy Burnham
- David Lammy, Deputy Prime Minister of the United Kingdom
- Lucy Powell, Deputy Leader of the Labour Party
- Rachel Reeves, Chancellor of the Exchequer
- Yvette Cooper, Foreign Secretary
- Bridget Phillipson, Secretary of State for Education
- Darren Jones, Chancellor of the Duchy of Lancaster
- Steve Reed, Secretary of State for Housing, Communities and Local Government
- Emma Reynolds, Secretary of State for Environment, Food and Rural Affairs
- James Murray, Secretary of State for Health and Social Care
- Dan Jarvis, Secretary of State for Defence
- Nick Thomas-Symonds, Minister for the Cabinet Office
- Douglas Alexander, Secretary of State for Scotland
- Jo Stevens, Secretary of State for Wales
- Wes Streeting, former Secretary of State for Health and Social Care
- Louise Haigh, former Secretary of State for Transport
- Stephen Kinnock, Minister of State for Care
- Alison McGovern, Minister of State for Local Government and Homelessness
- Hamish Falconer, Parliamentary Under-Secretary of State
- Al Carns, former Parliamentary Under-Secretary of State for the Armed Forces
- Luke Charters, Member of Parliament for York Outer
- Jo White, Member of Parliament for Bassetlaw
- Melanie Ward, Member of Parliament for Cowdenbeath and Kirkcaldy
- Connor Naismith, Member of Parliament for Crewe and Nantwich
- Rachel Taylor, Member of Parliament for North Warwickshire and Bedworth
- Paul Waugh, Member of Parliament for Rochdale
- Rachael Maskell, Member of Parliament for York Central
- Rosie Wrighting, Member of Parliament for Kettering
- Lee Barron, Member of Parliament for Corby and East Northamptonshire
- Matt Bishop, Member of Parliament for Forest of Dean
- Gill Furniss, Member of Parliament for Sheffield Brightside and Hillsborough
- Sarah Champion, Member of Parliament for Rotherham
- Chris Curtis, Member of Parliament for Milton Keynes North
- Paul Foster, Member of Parliament for South Ribble
- Chris Webb, Member of Parliament for Blackpool South
- Oliver Ryan, Member of Parliament for Burnley
- Clive Lewis, Member of Parliament for Norwich South
- Patrick Hurley, Member of Parliament for Southport
- Jo Platt, Member of Parliament for Leigh and Atherton
- Debbie Abrahams, Member of Parliament for Oldham East and Saddleworth
- Neil Duncan-Jordan, Member of Parliament for Poole
- Liam Byrne, Member of Parliament for Birmingham Hodge Hill and Solihull North
- Tom Hayes, Member of Parliament for Bournemouth East
- Gordon McKee, Member of Parliament for Glasgow South
- Anna McMorrin, Member of Parliament for Cardiff North
- Lizzi Collinge, Member of Parliament for Morecambe and Lunesdale

== Nominations ==
Burnham received 322 nominations on the day nominations opened, one short of the 323 that would mean no other candidate could receive enough nominations to challenge him. By convention, the outgoing party leader (Starmer), NEC chair (Shabana Mahmood) and party chair (Anna Turley) did not nominate anyone.

By 13 July he had received 349 PLP nominations, rising to 379 by 15 July. After the deadline had passed, Burnham was the only remaining candidate, and secured the nominations of 23 Labour Party affiliates; as there were no other eligible candidates by the affiliate deadline, Burnham was declared Leader of the Labour Party at a special party conference on 17th July.

List of MPs who nominated Andy Burnham (379)

By 9 July:

1. Debbie Abrahams, MP for Oldham East and Saddleworth
2. Zubir Ahmed, MP for Glasgow South West
3. Luke Akehurst, MP for North Durham
4. Bayo Alaba, MP for Southend East and Rochford
5. Dan Aldridge, MP for Weston-super-Mare
6. Douglas Alexander, MP for Lothian East
7. Heidi Alexander, MP for Swindon South
8. Sadik Al-Hassan, MP for North Somerset
9. Rushanara Ali, MP for Bethnal Green and Stepney
10. Rosena Allin-Khan, MP for Tooting
11. Callum Anderson, MP for Buckingham and Bletchley
12. Fleur Anderson, MP for Putney
13. Tonia Antoniazzi, MP for Gower
14. Scott Arthur, MP for Edinburgh South West
15. Jess Asato, MP for Lowestoft
16. Jas Athwal, MP for Ilford South
17. Catherine Atkinson, MP for Derby North
18. Lewis Atkinson, MP for Sunderland Central
19. Calvin Bailey, MP for Leyton and Wanstead
20. Olivia Bailey, MP for Reading West and Mid Berkshire
21. David Baines, MP for St Helens North
22. Alex Baker, MP for Aldershot
23. Richard Baker, MP for Glenrothes and Mid Fife
24. Alex Ballinger, MP for Halesowen
25. Antonia Bance, MP for Tipton and Wednesbury
26. Paula Barker, MP for Liverpool Wavertree
27. Lee Barron, MP for Corby and East Northamptonshire
28. Alex Barros-Curtis, MP for Cardiff West
29. Danny Beales, MP for Uxbridge and South Ruislip
30. Lorraine Beavers, MP for Blackpool North and Fleetwood
31. Torsten Bell, MP for Swansea West
32. Hilary Benn, MP for Leeds South
33. Clive Betts, MP for Sheffield South East
34. Polly Billington, MP for East Thanet
35. Matt Bishop, MP for Forest of Dean
36. Olivia Blake, MP for Sheffield Hallam
37. Rachel Blake, MP for Cities of London and Westminster
38. Chris Bloore, MP for Redditch
39. Elsie Blundell, MP for Heywood and Middleton North
40. Kevin Bonavia, MP for Stevenage
41. Jade Botterill, MP for Ossett and Denby Dale
42. Sureena Brackenridge, MP for Wolverhampton North East
43. Jonathan Brash, MP for Hartlepool
44. Chris Bryant, MP for Rhondda and Ogmore
45. Julia Buckley, MP for Shrewsbury
46. Maureen Burke, MP for Glasgow North East
47. Andy Burnham, MP for Makerfield
48. David Burton-Sampson, MP for Southend West and Leigh
49. Dawn Butler, MP for Brent East
50. Liam Byrne, MP for Birmingham Hodge Hill and Solihull North
51. Ruth Cadbury, MP for Brentford and Isleworth
52. Nesil Caliskan, MP for Barking
53. Irene Campbell, MP for North Ayrshire and Arran
54. Alan Campbell, MP for Tynemouth
55. Dan Carden, MP for Liverpool Walton
56. Sam Carling, MP for North West Cambridgeshire
57. Al Carns, MP for Birmingham Selly Oak
58. Sarah Champion, MP for Rotherham
59. Bambos Charalambous, MP for Southgate and Wood Green
60. Luke Charters, MP for York Outer
61. Feryal Clark, MP for Enfield North
62. Ben Coleman, MP for Chelsea and Fulham
63. Jacob Collier, MP for Burton and Uttoxeter
64. Lizzi Collinge, MP for Morecambe and Lunesdale
65. Liam Conlon, MP for Beckenham and Penge
66. Sarah Coombes, MP for West Bromwich
67. Andrew Cooper, MP for Mid Cheshire
68. Beccy Cooper, MP for Worthing West
69. Yvette Cooper, MP for Pontefract, Castleford and Knottingley
70. Deirdre Costigan, MP for Ealing Southall
71. Mary Creagh, MP for Coventry East
72. Stella Creasy, MP for Walthamstow
73. Torcuil Crichton, MP for Na h-Eileanan an Iar
74. Chris Curtis, MP for Milton Keynes North
75. Janet Daby, MP for Lewisham East
76. Nicholas Dakin, MP for Scunthorpe
77. Ashley Dalton, MP for West Lancashire
78. Emily Darlington, MP for Milton Keynes Central
79. Paul Davies, MP for Colne Valley
80. Shaun Davies, MP for Telford
81. Alex Davies-Jones, MP for Pontypridd
82. Marsha De Cordova, MP for Battersea
83. Kate Dearden, MP for Halifax
84. Tanmanjeet Singh Dhesi, MP for Slough
85. Jim Dickson, MP for Dartford
86. Anna Dixon, MP for Shipley
87. Samantha Dixon, MP for Chester North and Neston
88. Anneliese Dodds, MP for Oxford East
89. Helena Dollimore, MP for Hastings and Rye
90. Stephen Doughty, MP for Cardiff South and Penarth
91. Peter Dowd, MP for Bootle
92. Graeme Downie, MP for Dunfermline and Dollar
93. Angela Eagle, MP for Wallasey
94. Maria Eagle, MP for Liverpool Garston
95. Cat Eccles, MP for Stourbridge
96. Lauren Edwards, MP for Rochester and Strood
97. Clive Efford, MP for Eltham and Chislehurst
98. Damien Egan, MP for Bristol North East
99. Maya Ellis, MP for Ribble Valley
100. Chris Elmore, MP for Bridgend
101. Kirith Entwistle, MP for Bolton North East
102. Florence Eshalomi, MP for Vauxhall and Camberwell Green
103. Bill Esterson, MP for Sefton Central
104. Miatta Fahnbulleh, MP for Peckham
105. Hamish Falconer, MP for Lincoln
106. Linsey Farnsworth, MP for Amber Valley
107. Josh Fenton-Glynn, MP for Calder Valley
108. Mark Ferguson, MP for Gateshead Central and Whickham
109. Patricia Ferguson, MP for Glasgow West
110. Natalie Fleet, MP for Bolsover
111. Emma Foody, MP for Cramlington and Killingworth
112. Paul Foster, MP for South Ribble
113. Vicky Foxcroft, MP for Lewisham North
114. Mary Kelly Foy, MP for City of Durham
115. James Frith, MP for Bury North
116. Gill Furniss, MP for Sheffield Brightside and Hillsborough
117. Barry Gardiner, MP for Brent West
118. Allison Gardner, MP for Stoke-on-Trent South
119. Anna Gelderd, MP for South East Cornwall
120. Alan Gemmell, MP for Central Ayrshire
121. Tracy Gilbert, MP for Edinburgh North and Leith
122. Preet Kaur Gill, MP for Birmingham Edgbaston
123. Becky Gittins, MP for Clwyd East
124. Ben Goldsborough, MP for South Norfolk
125. Georgia Gould, MP for Queen's Park and Maida Vale
126. John Grady, MP for Glasgow East
127. Lilian Greenwood, MP for Nottingham South
128. Nia Griffith, MP for Llanelli
129. Louise Haigh, MP for Sheffield Heeley
130. Sarah Hall, MP for Warrington South
131. Fabian Hamilton, MP for Leeds North East
132. Paulette Hamilton, MP for Birmingham Erdington
133. Emma Hardy, MP for Kingston upon Hull West and Haltemprice
134. Lloyd Hatton, MP for South Dorset
135. Helen Hayes, MP for Dulwich and West Norwood
136. Tom Hayes, MP for Bournemouth East
137. Claire Hazelgrove, MP for Filton and Bradley Stoke
138. John Healey, MP for Rawmarsh and Conisbrough
139. Rachel Hopkins, MP for Luton South and South Bedfordshire
140. Claire Hughes, MP for Bangor Aberconwy
141. Alison Hume, MP for Scarborough and Whitby
142. Rupa Huq, MP for Ealing Central and Acton
143. Patrick Hurley, MP for Southport
144. Natasha Irons, MP for Croydon East
145. Sally Jameson, MP for Doncaster Central
146. Dan Jarvis, MP for Barnsley North
147. Terry Jermy, MP for South West Norfolk
148. Adam Jogee, MP for Newcastle-under-Lyme
149. Diana Johnson, MP for Kingston upon Hull North and Cottingham
150. Kim Johnson, MP for Liverpool Riverside
151. Darren Jones, MP for Bristol North West
152. Lillian Jones, MP for Kilmarnock and Loudoun
153. Ruth Jones, MP for Newport West and Islwyn
154. Sarah Jones, MP for Croydon West
155. Sojan Joseph, MP for Ashford
156. Warinder Juss, MP for Wolverhampton West
157. Chris Kane, MP for Stirling and Strathallan
158. Mike Kane, MP for Wythenshawe and Sale East
159. Satvir Kaur, MP for Southampton Test
160. Liz Kendall, MP for Leicester West
161. Afzal Khan, MP for Manchester Rusholme
162. Naushabah Khan, MP for Gillingham and Rainham
163. Stephen Kinnock, MP for Aberafan Maesteg
164. Sonia Kumar, MP for Dudley
165. Uma Kumaran, MP for Stratford and Bow
166. Peter Kyle, MP for Hove and Portslade
167. Laura Kyrke-Smith, MP for Aylesbury
168. Peter Lamb, MP for Crawley
169. David Lammy, MP for Tottenham
170. Ian Lavery, MP for Blyth and Ashington
171. Noah Law, MP for St Austell and Newquay
172. Kim Leadbeater, MP for Spen Valley
173. Emma Lewell, MP for South Shields
174. Andrew Lewin, MP for Welwyn Hatfield
175. Clive Lewis, MP for Norwich South
176. Simon Lightwood, MP for Wakefield and Rothwell
177. Rebecca Long-Bailey, MP for Salford
178. Josh MacAlister, MP for Whitehaven and Workington
179. Alice Macdonald, MP for Norwich North
180. Andy MacNae, MP for Rossendale and Darwen
181. Justin Madders, MP for Ellesmere Port and Bromborough
182. Seema Malhotra, MP for Feltham and Heston
183. Amanda Martin, MP for Portsmouth North
184. Rachael Maskell, MP for York Central
185. Keir Mather, MP for Selby
186. Douglas McAllister, MP for West Dunbartonshire
187. Kerry McCarthy, MP for Bristol East
188. Martin McCluskey, MP for Inverclyde and Renfrewshire West
189. Andy McDonald, MP for Middlesbrough and Thornaby East
190. Chris McDonald, MP for Stockton North
191. Blair McDougall, MP for East Renfrewshire
192. Lola McEvoy, MP for Darlington
193. Pat McFadden, MP for Wolverhampton South East
194. Alison McGovern, MP for Birkenhead
195. Alex McIntyre, MP for Gloucester
196. Gordon McKee, MP for Glasgow South
197. Kevin McKenna, MP for Sittingbourne and Sheppey
198. Catherine McKinnell, MP for Newcastle upon Tyne North
199. Jim McMahon, MP for Oldham West, Chadderton and Royton
200. Anna McMorrin, MP for Cardiff North
201. Frank McNally, MP for Coatbridge and Bellshill
202. Kirsty McNeill, MP for Midlothian
203. Anneliese Midgley, MP for Knowsley
204. Ed Miliband, MP for Doncaster North
205. Navendu Mishra, MP for Stockport
206. Abtisam Mohamed, MP for Sheffield Central
207. Stephen Morgan, MP for Portsmouth South
208. Grahame Morris, MP for Easington
209. Joe Morris, MP for Hexham
210. Luke Murphy, MP for Basingstoke
211. Chris Murray, MP for Edinburgh East and Musselburgh
212. Ian Murray, MP for Edinburgh South
213. James Murray, MP for Ealing North
214. James Naish, MP for Rushcliffe
215. Connor Naismith, MP for Crewe and Nantwich
216. Lisa Nandy, MP for Wigan
217. Kanishka Narayan, MP for Vale of Glamorgan
218. Pamela Nash, MP for Motherwell, Wishaw and Carluke
219. Josh Newbury, MP for Cannock Chase
220. Charlotte Nichols, MP for Warrington North
221. Alex Norris, MP for Nottingham North and Kimberley
222. Melanie Onn, MP for Great Grimsby and Cleethorpes
223. Chi Onwurah, MP for Newcastle upon Tyne Central and West
224. Simon Opher, MP for Stroud
225. Kate Osborne, MP for Jarrow and Gateshead East
226. Tristan Osborne, MP for Chatham and Aylesford
227. Taiwo Owatemi, MP for Coventry North West
228. Sarah Owen, MP for Luton North
229. Andrew Pakes, MP for Peterborough
230. Matthew Patrick, MP for Wirral West
231. Michael Payne, MP for Gedling
232. Stephanie Peacock, MP for Barnsley South
233. Jon Pearce, MP for High Peak
234. Matthew Pennycook, MP for Greenwich and Woolwich
235. Toby Perkins, MP for Chesterfield
236. Bridget Phillipson, MP for Houghton and Sunderland South
237. David Pinto-Duschinsky, MP for Hendon
238. Lee Pitcher, MP for Doncaster East and the Isle of Axholme
239. Jo Platt, MP for Leigh and Atherton
240. Luke Pollard, MP for Plymouth Sutton and Devonport
241. Joe Powell, MP for Kensington and Bayswater
242. Lucy Powell, MP for Manchester Central
243. Gregor Poynton, MP for Livingston
244. Peter Prinsley, MP for Bury St Edmunds and Stowmarket
245. Yasmin Qureshi, MP for Bolton South and Walkden
246. Steve Race, MP for Exeter
247. Connor Rand, MP for Altrincham and Sale West
248. Andrew Ranger, MP for Wrexham
249. Angela Rayner, MP for Ashton-under-Lyne
250. Ellie Reeves, MP for Lewisham West and East Dulwich
251. Rachel Reeves, MP for Leeds West and Pudsey
252. Emma Reynolds, MP for Wycombe
253. Jonathan Reynolds, MP for Stalybridge and Hyde
254. Martin Rhodes, MP for Glasgow North
255. Jake Richards, MP for Rother Valley
256. Jenny Riddell-Carpenter, MP for Suffolk Coastal
257. Lucy Rigby, MP for Northampton North
258. Dave Robertson, MP for Lichfield
259. Tim Roca, MP for Macclesfield
260. Matt Rodda, MP for Reading Central
261. Sam Rushworth, MP for Bishop Auckland
262. Sarah Russell, MP for Congleton
263. Tom Rutland, MP for East Worthing and Shoreham
264. Oliver Ryan, MP for Burnley
265. Sarah Sackman, MP for Finchley and Golders Green
266. Jeevun Sandher, MP for Loughborough
267. Naz Shah, MP for Bradford West
268. Baggy Shanker, MP for Derby South
269. Michael Shanks, MP for Rutherglen
270. Andy Slaughter, MP for Hammersmith and Chiswick
271. David Smith, MP for North Northumberland
272. Jeff Smith, MP for Manchester Withington
273. Sarah Smith, MP for Hyndburn
274. Karin Smyth, MP for Bristol South
275. Gareth Snell, MP for Stoke-on-Trent Central
276. Alex Sobel, MP for Leeds Central and Headingley
277. Euan Stainbank, MP for Falkirk
278. Jo Stevens, MP for Cardiff East
279. Kenneth Stevenson, MP for Airdrie and Shotts
280. Elaine Stewart, MP for Ayr, Carrick and Cumnock
281. Will Stone, MP for Swindon North
282. Alistair Strathern, MP for Hitchin
283. Wes Streeting, MP for Ilford North
284. Alan Strickland, MP for Newton Aycliffe and Spennymoor
285. Lauren Sullivan, MP for Gravesham
286. Kirsteen Sullivan, MP for Bathgate and Linlithgow
287. Peter Swallow, MP for Bracknell
288. Mark Tami, MP for Alyn and Deeside
289. Alison Taylor, MP for Paisley and Renfrewshire North
290. Rachel Taylor, MP for North Warwickshire and Bedworth
291. Fred Thomas, MP for Plymouth Moor View
292. Gareth Thomas, MP for Harrow West
293. Nick Thomas-Symonds, MP for Torfaen
294. Adam Thompson, MP for Erewash
295. Emily Thornberry, MP for Islington South and Finsbury
296. Marie Tidball, MP for Penistone and Stocksbridge
297. Stephen Timms, MP for East Ham
298. Dan Tomlinson, MP for Chipping Barnet
299. Henry Tufnell, MP for Mid and South Pembrokeshire
300. Matt Turmaine, MP for Watford
301. Laurence Turner, MP for Birmingham Northfield
302. Derek Twigg, MP for Widnes and Halewood
303. Liz Twist, MP for Blaydon and Consett
304. Harpreet Uppal, MP for Huddersfield
305. Tony Vaughan, MP for Folkestone and Hythe
306. Valerie Vaz, MP for Walsall and Bloxwich
307. Christian Wakeford, MP for Bury South
308. Melanie Ward, MP for Cowdenbeath and Kirkcaldy
309. Paul Waugh, MP for Rochdale
310. Chris Webb, MP for Blackpool South
311. Michelle Welsh, MP for Sherwood Forest
312. Andrew Western, MP for Stretford and Urmston
313. Michael Wheeler, MP for Worsley and Eccles
314. Jo White, MP for Bassetlaw
315. Katie White, MP for Leeds North West
316. David Williams, MP for Stoke-on-Trent North
317. Sean Woodcock, MP for Banbury
318. Rosie Wrighting, MP for Kettering
319. Yuan Yang, MP for Earley and Woodley
320. Mohammad Yasin, MP for Bedford
321. Steve Yemm, MP for Mansfield
322. Daniel Zeichner, MP for Cambridge

By 13 July:

1. Jack Abbott, MP for Ipswich
2. Tahir Ali, MP for Birmingham Hall Green and Moseley
3. Richard Burgon, MP for Leeds East
4. Ian Byrne, MP for Liverpool West Derby
5. Juliet Campbell, MP for Broxtowe
6. Catherine Fookes, MP for Monmouthshire
7. Gill German, MP for Clwyd North
8. Amanda Hack, MP for North West Leicestershire
9. Meg Hillier, MP for Hackney South and Shoreditch
10. Imran Hussain, MP for Bradford East
11. Louise Sandher-Jones, MP for North East Derbyshire
12. Jayne Kirkham, MP for Truro and Falmouth
13. Margaret Mullane, MP for Dagenham and Rainham
14. Katrina Murray, MP for Cumbernauld and Kirkintilloch
15. Kate Osamor, MP for Edmonton and Winchmore Hill
16. Darren Paffey, MP for Southampton Itchen
17. Jess Phillips, MP for Birmingham Yardley
18. Mike Reader, MP for Northampton South
19. Steve Reed, MP for Streatham and Croydon North
20. Michelle Scrogham, MP for Barrow and Furness
21. Mike Tapp, MP for Dover and Deal
22. David Taylor, MP for Hemel Hempstead
23. Chris Vince, MP for Harlow
24. Imogen Walker, MP for Hamilton and Clyde Valley
25. Chris Ward, MP for Brighton Kemptown and Peacehaven
26. Catherine West, MP for Hornsey and Friern Barnet
27. John Whitby, MP for Derbyshire Dales

By 14 July:

1. James Asser, MP for West Ham and Beckton
2. Markus Campbell-Savours, MP for Penrith and Solway
3. Pam Cox, MP for Colchester
4. Jen Craft, MP for Thurrock
5. Judith Cummins, MP for Bradford South
6. Jonathan Davies, MP for Mid Derbyshire
7. Josh Dean, MP for Hertford and Stortford
8. Sarah Edwards, MP for Tamworth
9. Chris Evans MP for Caerphilly
10. Mark Hendrick, MP for Preston
11. Sharon Hodgson, MP for Washington and Gateshead South
12. Gerald Jones, MP for Merthyr Tydfil and Aberdare
13. Gen Kitchen, MP for Wellingborough and Rushden
14. Brian Leishman, MP for Alloa and Grangemouth
15. Jessica Morden, MP for Newport East
16. Luke Myer, MP for Middlesbrough South and East Cleveland
17. Abena Oppong-Asare, MP for Erith and Thamesmead
18. Marie Rimmer, MP for St Helens South and Whiston
19. Cat Smith, MP for Lancaster and Wyre
20. Steve Witherden, MP for Montgomeryshire and Glyndŵr

By 15 July (close of nominations):

1. Johanna Baxter, MP for Paisley and Renfrewshire South
2. Daniel Francis, MP for Bexleyheath and Crayford
3. Jodie Gosling, MP for Nuneaton
4. Jonathan Hinder, MP for Pendle and Clitheroe
5. Leigh Ingham, MP for Stafford
6. Gurinder Singh Josan, MP for Smethwick
7. Julie Minns, MP for Carlisle
8. Mark Sewards, MP for Leeds South West and Morley
9. Tulip Siddiq, MP for Hampstead and Highgate
10. Matt Western, MP for Warwick and Leamington
List of MPs who nominated Catherine West (1)

On 14 July:

1. Neil Coyle, MP for Bermondsey and Old Southwark
List of MPs who did not endorse a candidate (23)
1. Apsana Begum, MP for Poplar and Limehouse
2. Phil Brickell, MP for Bolton West
3. Tom Collins, MP for Worcester
4. Neil Duncan-Jordan, MP for Poole
5. Mary Glindon, MP for Newcastle upon Tyne East and Wallsend
6. Carolyn Harris, MP for Neath and Swansea East
7. Chris Hinchliff, MP for North East Hertfordshire
8. Alex Mayer, MP for Dunstable and Leighton Buzzard
9. Siobhain McDonagh, MP for Mitcham and Morden
10. John McDonnell, MP for Hayes and Harlington
11. Perran Moon, MP for Camborne and Redruth
12. Samantha Niblett, MP for South Derbyshire
13. Richard Quigley, MP for Isle of Wight West
14. Bell Ribeiro-Addy, MP for Clapham and Brixton Hill
15. John Slinger, MP for Rugby
16. Nick Smith, MP for Blaenau Gwent and Rhymney
17. Graham Stringer, MP for Blackley and Middleton South
18. Jessica Toale, MP for Bournemouth West
19. Jon Trickett, MP for Normanton and Hemsworth
20. Nadia Whittome, MP for Nottingham East

Did not endorse due to Labour party convention:

1. Shabana Mahmood, MP for Birmingham Ladywood (Note: Due to being the NEC chair)
2. Keir Starmer, MP for Holborn and St Pancras (Note: Due to being the outgoing party leader)
3. Anna Turley, MP for Redcar (Note: Due to being Chair of the Labour Party)
List of Labour Party affiliates who nominated Andy Burnham (23)
1. Labour Party Irish Society
2. UNISON
3. ASLEF
4. TSSA
5. Community
6. USDAW
7. Communication Workers Union
8. GMB
9. Musician's Union
10. National Union of Mineworkers
11. Unite
12. East and South East Asians for Labour
13. Christians on the Left
14. Disability Labour
15. Jewish Labour Movement
16. Labour Business
17. Labour Campaign for International Development
18. Labour Housing Group
19. Labour Movement for Europe
20. Scientists for Labour
21. Socialist Environment and Resources Association
22. Labour in Local and Regional Government
23. Fire Brigades Union

Candidate	First stage Parliamentary Labour Party members			Second stage Labour Party affiliates		
Candidate	Nominations	%		Nominations	%	
Andy Burnham	379 / 403	94%	✓	23 / 33	69.7%	✓
Catherine West (eliminated)	1 / 403	0.2%	✗			
Total nominations	380 / 403	94.3%		23 / 33	69.7%	

== Opinion polls ==
Hypothetical polling

Polling companies began polling Labour members on their preferred candidate in a potential leadership contest prior to Starmer's resignation announcement.

Multi-candidate polling

Dates conducted	Pollster	Sample size	Andy Burnham	Al Carns	Yvette Cooper	Louise Haigh	Sadiq Khan	David Lammy	Shabana Mahmood	Ed Miliband	Bridget Phillipson	Lucy Powell	Angela Rayner	Keir Starmer	Wes Streeting
15–19 May 2026	Ipsos	346 Labour voters	38%	0%	3%	—N/a	3%	3%	2%	3%	0%	1%	7%	—N/a	4%
15–19 May 2026	Ipsos	346 Labour voters	31%	0%	4%	—N/a	1%	1%	0%	2%	1%	1%	4%	18%	2%
14–18 May 2026	YouGov	706 Labour members	47%	0%	3%	—N/a	—N/a	—N/a	1%	3%	—N/a	—N/a	8%	31%	4%
15–16 May 2026	Find Out Now	306 Labour members	36%	1%	—N/a	—N/a	—N/a	—N/a	—N/a	4%	—N/a	—N/a	7%	36%	2%
30 Apr – 5 May 2026	Survation	1,078 Labour members	42%	2%	5%	1%	—N/a	—N/a	4%	10%	—N/a	1%	11%	—N/a	11%
29 Jan – 3 February 2026	Survation	1,264 Labour members	41%	—N/a	7%	1%	—N/a	—N/a	7%	8%	—N/a	1%	17%	—N/a	19%

Head-to-head

Dates conducted	Pollster	Sample size	Andy Burnham	Al Carns	Yvette Cooper	Louise Haigh	Darren Jones	Shabana Mahmood	Ed Miliband	Bridget Phillipson	Lucy Powell	Angela Rayner	Keir Starmer	Wes Streeting
14–18 May 2026	YouGov	706 Labour members	75%	—N/a	—N/a	—N/a	—N/a	—N/a	21%	—N/a	—N/a	—N/a	—N/a	—N/a
14–18 May 2026	YouGov	706 Labour members	69%	—N/a	—N/a	—N/a	—N/a	—N/a	—N/a	—N/a	—N/a	27%	—N/a	—N/a
14–18 May 2026	YouGov	706 Labour members	59%	—N/a	—N/a	—N/a	—N/a	—N/a	—N/a	—N/a	—N/a	—N/a	37%	—N/a
14–18 May 2026	YouGov	706 Labour members	80%	—N/a	—N/a	—N/a	—N/a	—N/a	—N/a	—N/a	—N/a	—N/a	—N/a	10%
14–18 May 2026	YouGov	706 Labour members	—N/a	—N/a	—N/a	—N/a	—N/a	—N/a	35%	—N/a	—N/a	61%	—N/a	—N/a
14–18 May 2026	YouGov	706 Labour members	—N/a	—N/a	—N/a	—N/a	—N/a	—N/a	38%	—N/a	—N/a	—N/a	58%	—N/a
14–18 May 2026	YouGov	706 Labour members	—N/a	—N/a	—N/a	—N/a	—N/a	—N/a	58%	—N/a	—N/a	—N/a	—N/a	28%
14–18 May 2026	YouGov	706 Labour members	—N/a	—N/a	—N/a	—N/a	—N/a	—N/a	—N/a	—N/a	—N/a	47%	49%	—N/a
14–18 May 2026	YouGov	706 Labour members	—N/a	—N/a	—N/a	—N/a	—N/a	—N/a	—N/a	—N/a	—N/a	70%	—N/a	19%
14–18 May 2026	YouGov	706 Labour members	—N/a	—N/a	—N/a	—N/a	—N/a	—N/a	—N/a	—N/a	—N/a	—N/a	65%	15%
13–14 May 2026	Survation	1,124 Labour members	61%	—N/a	—N/a	—N/a	—N/a	—N/a	—N/a	—N/a	—N/a	—N/a	28%	—N/a
13–14 May 2026	Survation	1,124 Labour members	71%	—N/a	—N/a	—N/a	—N/a	—N/a	—N/a	—N/a	—N/a	—N/a	—N/a	18%
13–14 May 2026	Survation	1,124 Labour members	—N/a	17%	—N/a	—N/a	—N/a	—N/a	—N/a	—N/a	—N/a	—N/a	45%	—N/a
13–14 May 2026	Survation	1,124 Labour members	—N/a	—N/a	31%	—N/a	—N/a	—N/a	—N/a	—N/a	—N/a	—N/a	45%	—N/a
13–14 May 2026	Survation	1,124 Labour members	—N/a	—N/a	—N/a	29%	—N/a	—N/a	—N/a	—N/a	—N/a	—N/a	50%	—N/a
13–14 May 2026	Survation	1,124 Labour members	—N/a	—N/a	—N/a	—N/a	25%	—N/a	—N/a	—N/a	—N/a	—N/a	40%	—N/a
13–14 May 2026	Survation	1,124 Labour members	—N/a	—N/a	—N/a	—N/a	—N/a	15%	—N/a	—N/a	—N/a	—N/a	64%	—N/a
13–14 May 2026	Survation	1,124 Labour members	—N/a	—N/a	—N/a	—N/a	—N/a	19%	—N/a	—N/a	—N/a	—N/a	—N/a	43%
13–14 May 2026	Survation	1,124 Labour members	—N/a	—N/a	—N/a	—N/a	—N/a	—N/a	46%	—N/a	—N/a	—N/a	39%	—N/a
13–14 May 2026	Survation	1,124 Labour members	—N/a	—N/a	—N/a	—N/a	—N/a	—N/a	58%	—N/a	—N/a	—N/a	—N/a	30%
13–14 May 2026	Survation	1,124 Labour members	—N/a	—N/a	—N/a	—N/a	—N/a	—N/a	—N/a	25%	—N/a	—N/a	46%	—N/a
13–14 May 2026	Survation	1,124 Labour members	—N/a	—N/a	—N/a	—N/a	—N/a	—N/a	—N/a	—N/a	27%	—N/a	51%	—N/a
13–14 May 2026	Survation	1,124 Labour members	—N/a	—N/a	—N/a	—N/a	—N/a	—N/a	—N/a	—N/a	45%	—N/a	—N/a	34%
13–14 May 2026	Survation	1,124 Labour members	—N/a	—N/a	—N/a	—N/a	—N/a	—N/a	—N/a	—N/a	—N/a	45%	41%	—N/a
13–14 May 2026	Survation	1,124 Labour members	—N/a	—N/a	—N/a	—N/a	—N/a	—N/a	—N/a	—N/a	—N/a	54%	—N/a	29%
13–14 May 2026	Survation	1,124 Labour members	—N/a	—N/a	—N/a	—N/a	—N/a	—N/a	—N/a	—N/a	—N/a	—N/a	53%	23%
29 Jan – 3 February 2026	Survation	1,264 Labour members	53%	—N/a	—N/a	—N/a	—N/a	—N/a	—N/a	—N/a	—N/a	—N/a	37%	—N/a
29 Jan – 3 February 2026	Survation	1,264 Labour members	—N/a	—N/a	26%	—N/a	—N/a	—N/a	—N/a	—N/a	—N/a	—N/a	49%	—N/a
29 Jan – 3 February 2026	Survation	1,264 Labour members	—N/a	—N/a	—N/a	25%	—N/a	—N/a	—N/a	—N/a	—N/a	—N/a	52%	—N/a
29 Jan – 3 February 2026	Survation	1,264 Labour members	—N/a	—N/a	—N/a	—N/a	—N/a	17%	—N/a	—N/a	—N/a	—N/a	55%	—N/a
29 Jan – 3 February 2026	Survation	1,264 Labour members	—N/a	—N/a	—N/a	—N/a	—N/a	—N/a	41%	—N/a	—N/a	—N/a	44%	—N/a
29 Jan – 3 February 2026	Survation	1,264 Labour members	—N/a	—N/a	—N/a	—N/a	—N/a	—N/a	—N/a	—N/a	29%	—N/a	52%	—N/a
29 Jan – 3 February 2026	Survation	1,264 Labour members	—N/a	—N/a	—N/a	—N/a	—N/a	—N/a	—N/a	—N/a	—N/a	48%	37%	—N/a
29 Jan – 3 February 2026	Survation	1,264 Labour members	—N/a	—N/a	—N/a	—N/a	—N/a	—N/a	—N/a	—N/a	—N/a	—N/a	42%	30%
22–23 Jan 2026	Find Out Now	501 Labour members	48%	—N/a	—N/a	—N/a	—N/a	—N/a	—N/a	—N/a	—N/a	—N/a	26%	—N/a
18–20 Nov 2025	Survation	1,013 Labour members	58%	—N/a	—N/a	—N/a	—N/a	—N/a	—N/a	—N/a	—N/a	—N/a	32%	—N/a
18–20 Nov 2025	Survation	1,013 Labour members	—N/a	—N/a	—N/a	—N/a	—N/a	16%	—N/a	—N/a	—N/a	—N/a	50%	—N/a
18–20 Nov 2025	Survation	1,013 Labour members	—N/a	—N/a	—N/a	—N/a	—N/a	—N/a	44%	—N/a	—N/a	—N/a	40%	—N/a
18–20 Nov 2025	Survation	1,013 Labour members	—N/a	—N/a	—N/a	—N/a	—N/a	—N/a	—N/a	26%	—N/a	—N/a	42%	—N/a
18–20 Nov 2025	Survation	1,013 Labour members	—N/a	—N/a	—N/a	—N/a	—N/a	—N/a	—N/a	—N/a	30%	—N/a	48%	—N/a
18–20 Nov 2025	Survation	1,013 Labour members	—N/a	—N/a	—N/a	—N/a	—N/a	—N/a	—N/a	—N/a	—N/a	52%	33%	—N/a
18–20 Nov 2025	Survation	1,013 Labour members	—N/a	—N/a	—N/a	—N/a	—N/a	—N/a	—N/a	—N/a	—N/a	—N/a	31%	33%

== See also ==
- 2025 Labour Party deputy leadership election
- 2026 Greater Manchester mayoral by-election
