= 2025 Labour Party deputy leadership election =

- 9 September – 25 October 2025
- Turnout: 160,943 (16.6%) ▼42.2pp
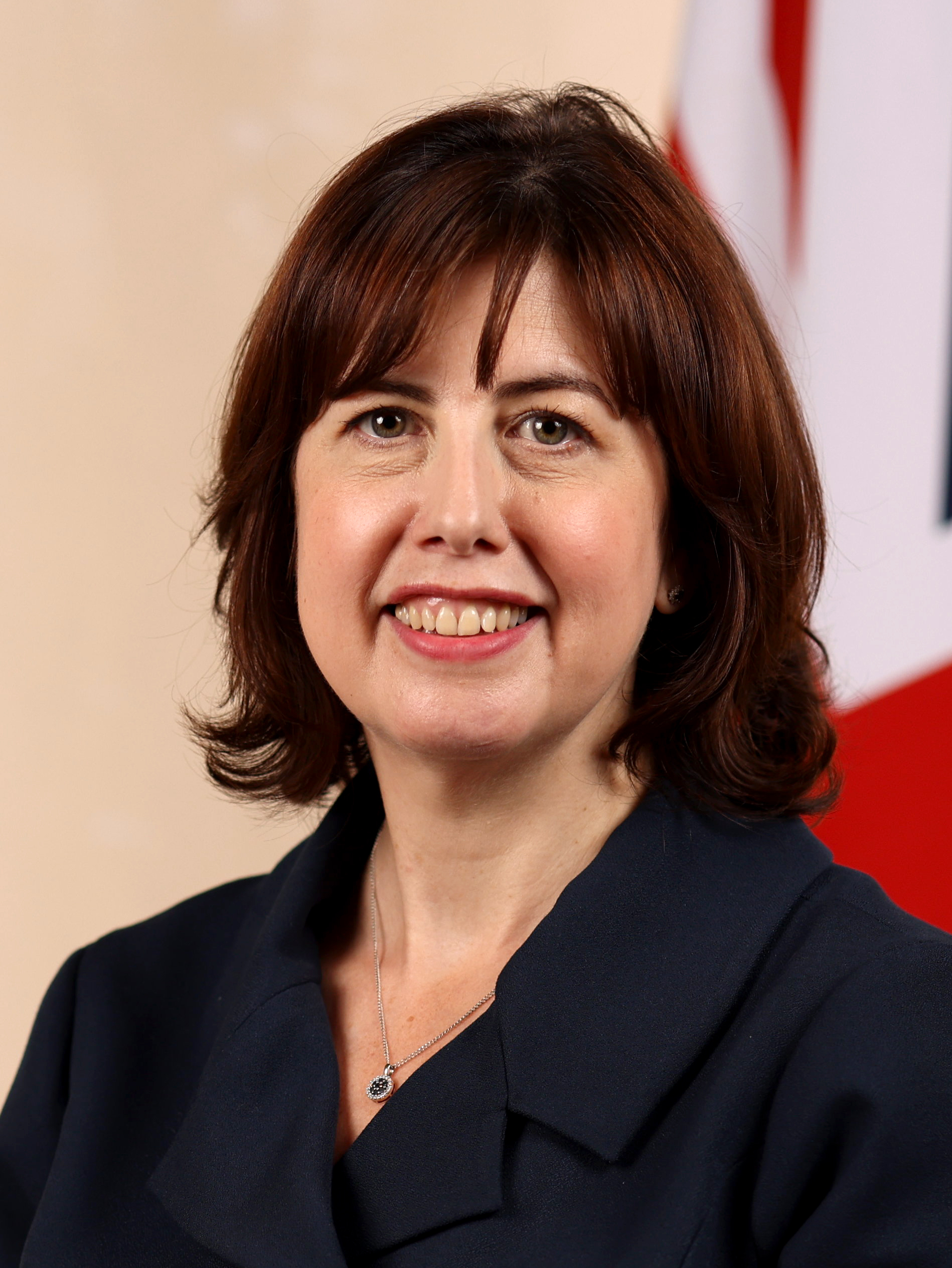

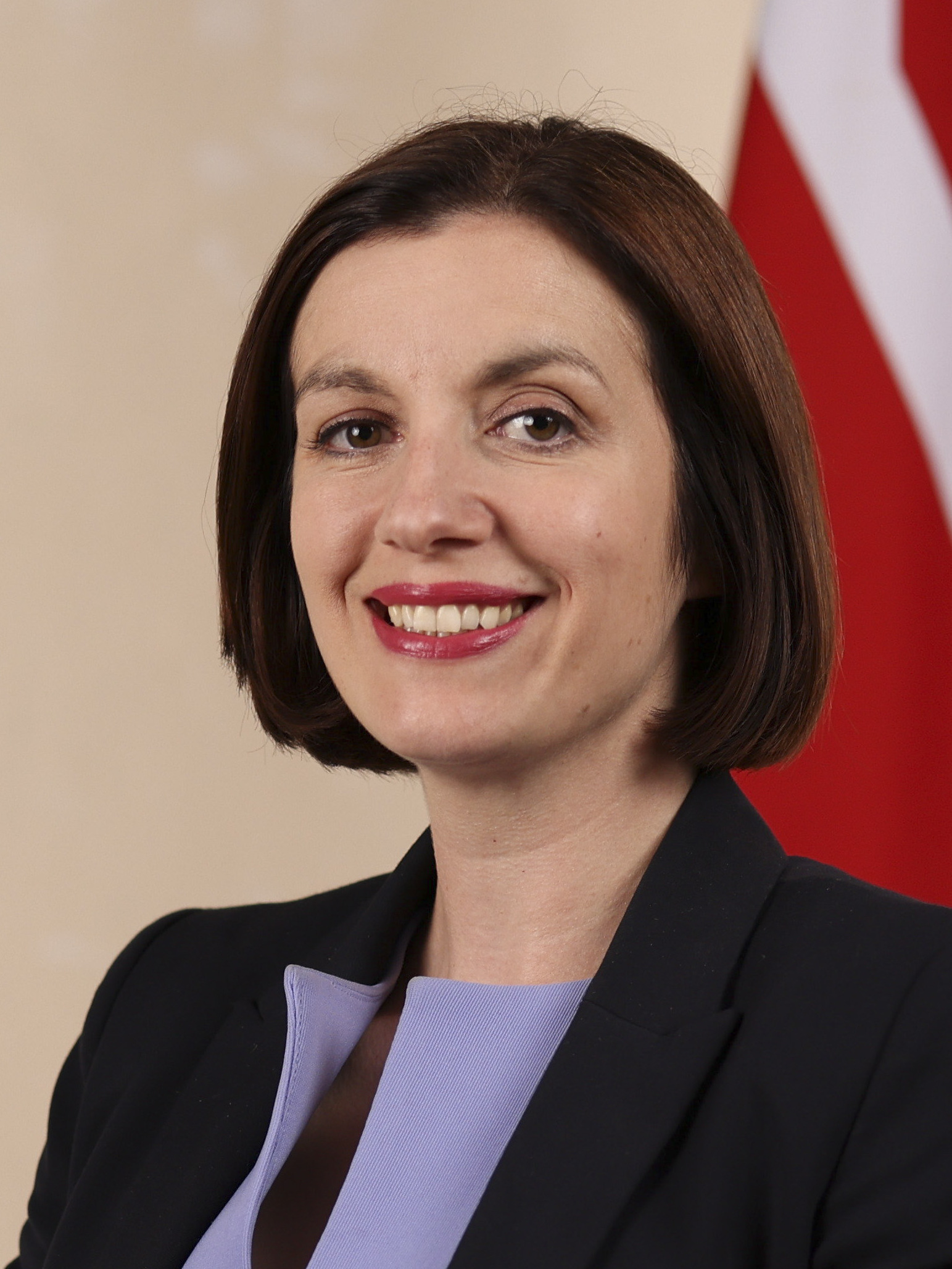
Candidate	Lucy Powell	Bridget Phillipson
Popular vote	87,407	73,536
Percentage	54.3%	45.7%
Deputy Leader before election
Angela Rayner (Note: Rayner resigned as Deputy Leader on 5 September 2025.)
Elected Deputy Leader
Lucy Powell

The 2025 Labour Party deputy leadership election was triggered on 5 September 2025 by the resignation of Angela Rayner as deputy leader of the Labour Party. It was the first deputy leadership election held by Labour in government since the 2007 deputy leadership election.

The results were announced on 25 October, and Lucy Powell was elected with 54.3% of the vote, saying: "We won't win by trying to out-Reform Reform, but by building a broad progressive consensus".

== Background ==
The 2020 deputy leadership election resulted in the election of soft left candidate Angela Rayner as deputy leader of the Labour Party, serving under Labour leader Keir Starmer. Following Labour's victory in the 2024 general election, Rayner served as Starmer's deputy prime minister and housing secretary until 5 September 2025, when she resigned after underpaying stamp duty tax. Rayner also resigned as deputy leader of the Labour Party, triggering an internal leadership election to elect a new deputy leader, in line with the provisions of the Labour Party Constitution. It was the first deputy leadership election held by Labour in government since the 2007 deputy leadership election.

The timeline of the campaign was decided by the National Executive Committee of the Labour Party (NEC) on 8 September. The constitution of the party states that a deputy leadership election, if triggered while Labour is in government, must be held at the next Labour Party Conference, which was scheduled to take place from 28 September to 1 October 2025. As the election was triggered less than a month before the conference, the NEC delayed the election to a later date.

The contest was marked by ill-concealed acrimony, with Phillipson launching multiple attacks branding Powell as a return to the disunity and division, as well accusing her of having no clout. By contrast, Powell argued that she would be a full-time Deputy Leader, bringing the heart of the party to the head of government, and calling for the government to be bolder, rather than trying to out-Reform Reform.

== Timetable ==
Timetable for the 2025 Labour Party deputy leadership election
Date	Event
5 Sep	Angela Rayner announces her resignation as Deputy Leader of the Labour Party after being found to have broken the ministerial code, triggering the election.
8 Sep	Freeze date for elector eligibility.
9 Sep	Parliamentary Labour Party (PLP) nominations open.
10 Sep	PLP candidate hustings are held.
11 Sep	PLP nominations close (17:00 BST).
12 Sep	Deadline for validly nominated candidates to consent to nomination and submit statements for circulation to Constituency Labour Parties (CLPs) and affiliates (13:00).
13 Sep	Constituency Labour Party and affiliate nominations open.
27 Sep	Close of CLP and affiliate nominations; deadline to clear arrears to be issued a ballot.
1 Oct	Hustings at conference.
5 Oct	Deadline to resolve disputes as to voter eligibility.
8 Oct	Ballots open.
22 Oct	Last date to reissue electronic ballots.
23 Oct	Ballots close (12:00).
25 Oct	Results announced.

== Campaign ==
=== Prior to candidate announcements ===
Mayor of Greater Manchester Andy Burnham, who was unable to contest the election as he was not an MP, endorsed the prospective campaigns of either Louise Haigh or Lucy Powell, both of whom were former cabinet ministers in the Starmer ministry. Jess Phillips was reportedly supported by a group of MPs prior to her declining to run.

Former deputy leader Harriet Harman said that the next deputy should be a woman.

Whilst Starmer did not publicly endorse any candidate, it was widely understood that Phillipson was his preferred candidate.

=== MP nomination stage ===
One Labour source suggested the race would come down to Powell against Phillipson, but other sources suggested the final ballot would be hard to predict, especially if candidates sought to avoid a contest among members. In the evening of 9 September, Politico's Playbook newsletter suggested Phillipson was the early frontrunner and may hit the 80 required nominations by the end of the day. Phillipson's team claimed to have passed the 80 MP threshold by 16:00 (BST) on 10 September.

According to George Eaton, writing in The New Statesman, Phillipson was seen as the preferred candidate of Number 10, and she was supported by many pro-leadership MPs and Ministers. Powell's most senior nominators, according to her campaign website, were Ed Miliband, Louise Haigh, Lisa Nandy and Stephen Kinnock.

Phillipson was regarded as having "solid right-of-centre backing".

== Candidates ==
Following changes to the Labour Party's constitution in 2021, candidates for the deputy leadership were required to be a sitting MP. They had to also receive nominations from 20% of the Parliamentary Labour Party (80 MPs as of September 2025) and either 5% (33) of Constituency Labour Parties or three organisations affiliated to the Labour Party, including at least two affiliated trade unions, to qualify for the ballot.

Neither of the final two candidates are regarded as left-wing.

=== Nominated by parliamentarians ===
Candidate	Political office(s)	MP Nominations	Campaign website
Bridget Phillipson	Secretary of State for Education (2024–2026); Minister for Women and Equalities (2024–); MP for Houghton and Sunderland South (2010–)	175 / 399	www.backbridget.com (Archived)
Lucy Powell	Former Leader of the House of Commons (2024–2025); MP for Manchester Central (2012–)	117 / 399	www.lucyfordeputy.co.uk (Archived)

=== Failed to reach required number of nominations ===
Candidate	Political office(s)	MP Nominations	Ref
Bell Ribeiro-Addy	MP for Clapham and Brixton Hill (2019–)	24 / 399	

=== Withdrawn ===
Candidate	Political office(s)	Withdrew	Ref.
Alison McGovern	Minister of State for Local Government and Homelessness (2025–2026); MP for Birkenhead (2024–)	10 September 2025 (endorsed Phillipson)	
Emily Thornberry	Chair of the Foreign Affairs Select Committee (2024–); MP for Islington South and Finsbury (2005–)	11 September 2025	
Paula Barker	MP for Liverpool Wavertree (2019–)	11 September 2025 (endorsed Powell)	

=== Declined ===
The following candidates were speculated as potential candidates but did not stand in the election:

- Rosena Allin-Khan, MP for Tooting and candidate in the 2020 deputy leadership election (nominated Powell)
- Richard Burgon, MP for Leeds East and candidate in the 2020 deputy leadership election (endorsed Ribeiro-Addy)
- Al Carns, Minister of State for the Armed Forces
- Dawn Butler, MP for Brent East and candidate in the 2020 deputy leadership election
- Louise Haigh, former Secretary of State for Transport (nominated Powell)
- Shabana Mahmood, Home Secretary
- Lisa Nandy, Secretary of State for Culture, Media and Sport and candidate in the 2020 leadership election
- Sarah Owen, MP for Luton North (nominated Powell)
- Jess Phillips, Parliamentary Under-Secretary of State for Safeguarding and Violence Against Women and Girls and candidate in the 2020 leadership election
- Wes Streeting, Secretary of State for Health and Social Care
- Anna Turley, Labour Party chair

== Nominations and endorsements ==
After receiving the nominations of over 20% of the PLP (80 MPs), to reach the all members' ballot, both candidates require the support of either 5% of CLPs or 3 affiliated organisations that represent at least 5% of the affiliate membership (including 2 trade unions).

Both candidates received enough nominations to make it on to the membership ballot

=== Bridget Phillipson ===
Bridget Phillipson

CLPs

- Aberdeen Central
- Aberdeen South & North Kincardine
- Aldershot
- Ashford
- Banbury
- Basildon & Billericay
- Basingstoke
- Barking
- Beckenham & Penge
- Beverley & Holderness
- Bexleyheath & Crayford
- Bicester & Woodstock
- Birkenhead
- Birmingham Edgbaston
- Birmingham Hodge Hill & Solihull North
- Birmingham Northfield
- Birmingham Perry Barr
- Birmingham Selly Oak
- Blaydon & Consett
- Brecon, Radnor and Cwm Tawe
- Bridlington & The Wolds
- Bristol North East
- Burton & Uttoxeter
- Bury North
- Cardiff East
- Cardiff South & Penarth
- Chelmsford
- Chingford & Woodford Green
- Chippenham
- Chorley
- Cities of London & Westminster
- Clapham & Brixton Hill
- Clwyd East
- Clydebank and Milngavie
- Cramlington & Killingworth
- Croydon East
- Darlington
- Derby South
- Doncaster Central
- Dover & Deal
- Dumbarton
- Dundee City West
- Ealing North
- Eastbourne
- East Hampshire
- Eastleigh
- Edinburgh Central
- Edinburgh Eastern
- Edinburgh Northern & Leith
- Edinburgh Pentlands
- Edmonton & Winchmore Hill
- Enfield North
- Erewash
- Erith & Thamesmead
- Esher & Walton
- Ettrick, Roxburgh and Berwickshire
- Exeter
- Feltham & Heston
- Filton & Bradley Stoke
- Finchley & Golders Green
- Gateshead Central & Whickham
- Gedling
- Gillingham & Rainham
- Glasgow Southside
- Goole & Pocklington
- Grantham & Bourne
- Greenock & Inverclyde
- Greenwich & Woolwich
- Hackney South & Shoreditch
- Halesowen
- Hammersmith & Chiswick
- Hampstead & Highgate
- Harlow
- Harpenden & Berkhamsted
- Harrow West
- Hartlepool
- Harwich & North Essex
- Hemel Hempstead
- Hendon
- Hertford & Stortford
- Hexham
- Hinckley & Bosworth
- Hitchin
- Holborn & St Pancras
- Horsham
- Houghton & Sunderland South
- Huntingdon
- Ilford North
- Ilford South
- Ipswich
- Jarrow & Gateshead East
- Kettering
- Kingston-upon-Hull North & Cottingham
- Labour International
- Leeds West & Pudsey
- Leeds South West & Morley
- Liverpool West Derby
- Maidenhead
- Meriden & Solihull East
- Mid Buckinghamshire
- Middlesbrough South & East Cleveland
- Mid Sussex
- Milton Keynes North
- Mitcham & Morden
- Moray
- Na h-Eileanan an Iar
- Newcastle-upon-Tyne Central & West
- Newcastle-upon-Tyne North
- New Forest West
- Newport West & Islwyn
- Newton Aycliffe & Spennymoor
- North Durham
- North Norfolk
- North Northumberland
- North West Cambridgeshire
- North West Essex
- North West Hampshire
- Nottingham North & Kimberley
- Nuneaton
- Old Bexley & Sidcup
- Plymouth Moor View
- Plymouth Sutton & Devonport
- Portsmouth South
- Putney
- Queen's Park & Maida Vale
- Rayleigh & Wickford
- Reading West & Mid Berkshire
- Redcar
- Rhondda & Ogmore
- Richmond Park
- Rother Valley
- Runcorn & Helsby
- Rutherglen
- Selby
- Sevenoaks
- Sheffield Central
- Skipton & Ripon
- Skye, Lochaber & Badenoch
- Smethwick
- Solihull West & Shirley
- South Basildon & East Thurrock
- South Cambridgeshire
- South Dorset
- South East Cornwall
- Southend West & Leigh
- Southgate & Wood Green
- South Leicestershire
- South Shields
- South West Devon
- South West Hertfordshire
- Stevenage
- Stockton West
- Streatham & Croydon North
- Sunderland Central
- Sutton Coldfield
- Swansea West
- Swindon South
- Tatton
- Thirsk & Malton
- Tipton & Wednesbury
- Torbay
- Torfaen
- Vauxhall & Camberwell Green
- Wakefield & Rothwell
- Walsall & Bloxwich
- Washington & Gateshead South
- Waveney Valley
- Welwyn Hatfield
- Wimbledon
- Wirral West
- Worcester
- Yeovil
- York Outer

Trade Unions

- Community
- GMB
- Musicians' Union
- NUM
- UNISON
- Usdaw

Socialist Societies

- Christians on the Left
- Labour Business
- Jewish Labour Movement
- Labour Housing Group

=== Lucy Powell ===
Lucy Powell

CLPs

- Aberdeen Donside
- Aldridge-Brownhills
- Almond Valley
- Altrincham & Sale West
- Amber Valley
- Angus North & Mearns
- Ashton-under-Lyne
- Arundel & South Downs
- Aylesbury
- Ayr
- Bangor Aberconwy
- Barnsley South
- Barrow-in-Furness
- Bassetlaw
- Battersea
- Beaconsfield
- Bexhill & Battle
- Bishop Auckland
- Birmingham Erdington
- Birmingham Hall Green & Moseley
- Birmingham Yardley
- Blackburn
- Blackley & Middleton South
- Blackpool North & Fleetwood
- Blackpool South
- Bognor Regis & Littlehampton
- Bolsover
- Bolton North East
- Bolton South & Walkden
- Bolton West
- Bootle
- Bournemouth West
- Bracknell
- Braintree
- Brent East
- Brent West
- Bridgwater
- Brighton Kemptown & Peacehaven
- Bristol Central
- Bristol East
- Bristol North West
- Bristol South
- Bromsgrove
- Broxbourne
- Buckingham & Bletchley
- Burnley
- Bury South
- Calder Valley
- Cambridge
- Camborne & Redruth
- Cannock Chase
- Canterbury
- Cardiff North
- Cardiff West
- Carlisle
- Carrick, Cumnock & Doon Valley
- Carshalton & Wallington
- Castle Point
- Central Devon
- Central Suffolk & North Ipswich
- Ceredigion Preseli
- Chatham & Aylesford
- Cheadle
- Chester North & Neston
- Chesterfield
- Chester South & Eddisbury
- Chichester
- Christchurch
- Clacton
- Clwyd North
- Clydesdale
- Colchester
- Congleton
- Corby & East Northamptonshire
- Coventry East
- Coventry South
- Crawley
- Crewe & Nantwich
- Croydon South
- Croydon West
- Cunninghame North
- Dagenham & Rainham
- Derby North
- Dewsbury & Batley
- Didcot & Wantage
- Doncaster North
- Droitwich & Evesham
- Dudley
- Dulwich & West Norwood
- Dunfermline
- Ealing Central & Acton
- Earley & Woodley
- Easington
- East Thanet
- East Wiltshire
- East Worthing & Shoreham
- Ellesmere Port & Bromborough
- Eltham & Chislehurst
- Epsom & Ewell
- Exmouth & Exeter East
- Falkirk East
- Farnham & Bordon
- Faversham & Mid Kent
- Folkestone & Hythe
- Forest of Dean
- Fylde
- Glasgow Anniesland
- Glasgow Kelvin
- Glasgow Maryhill & Springburn
- Gloucester
- Gorton & Denton
- Gravesham
- Great Grimsby & Cleethorpes
- Great Yarmouth
- Halifax
- Hamble Valley
- Hamilton, Larkhall & Stonehouse
- Harborough, Oadby and Wigston
- Havant
- Hazel Grove
- Henley & Thame
- Hereford & South Herefordshire
- Herne Bay & Sandwich
- Heywood & Middleton North
- High Peak
- Honiton & Sidmouth
- Huddersfield
- Hyndburn
- Islington South & Finsbury
- Keighley & Ilkley
- Kensington & Bayswater
- Kilmarnock & Irvine Valley
- Kingston-upon-Hull West & Haltemprice
- Kingswinford & South Staffordshire
- Lancaster & Wyre
- Leeds Central & Headingley
- Leeds North East
- Leicester South
- Leigh & Atherton
- Lewisham East
- Lewisham North
- Lewisham West & East Dulwich
- Lichfield
- Llanelli
- Loughborough
- Louth & Horncastle
- Lowestoft
- Maidstone & Malling
- Makerfield
- Maldon
- Manchester Central
- Manchester Rusholme
- Manchester Withington
- Melksham & Devizes
- Melton & Syston
- Mid Cheshire
- Mid Fife & Glenrothes
- Mid & South Pembrokeshire
- Milton Keynes Central
- Montgomeryshire & Glyndŵr
- Morecambe & Lunesdale
- Neath & Swansea East
- Newbury
- Newcastle-under-Lyme
- Newport East
- Newton Abbot
- North Devon
- North Dorset
- North East Cambridgeshire
- North East Hertfordshire
- North East Somerset & Hanham
- Northampton South
- North Herefordshire
- North Somerset
- North West Leicestershire
- North West Norfolk
- Norwich North
- Norwich South
- Oldham East & Saddleworth
- Oldham West, Chadderton & Royton
- Orpington
- Ossett & Denby Dale
- Oxford East
- Oxford West & Abingdon
- Paisley
- Peckham
- Penistone & Stocksbridge
- Pontefract, Castleford & Knottingley
- Pontypridd
- Poole
- Portsmouth North
- Preston
- Rawmarsh & Conisbrough
- Redditch
- Renfrewshire North & West
- Renfrewshire South
- Ribble Valley
- Rochdale
- Rochester & Strood
- Romsey & Southampton North
- Rossendale & Darwen
- Rugby
- Ruislip, Northwood & Pinner
- Runnymede & Weybridge
- Salford
- Scunthorpe
- Sefton Central
- Sheffield Brightside & Hillsborough
- Sheffield Hallam
- Sheffield Heeley
- Sheffield South East
- Shipley
- Shrewsbury
- Sittingbourne & Sheppey
- South Cotswolds
- South Derbyshire
- Southampton Itchen
- Southampton Test
- South Northamptonshire
- Southport
- South Ribble
- South West Norfolk
- South West Wiltshire
- Spelthorne
- Spen Valley
- Stafford
- Staffordshire Moorlands
- Stalybridge & Hyde
- St. Helens North
- St. Helens South & Whiston
- Stirling
- Stockport
- Stockton North
- Stoke-on-Trent Central
- Stoke-on-Trent North
- Stoke-on-Trent South
- Stone, Great Wyrley & Penkridge
- Stourbridge
- Strathkelvin & Bearsden
- Stretford & Urmston
- Stroud
- Suffolk Coastal
- Sussex Weald
- Sutton & Cheam
- Swindon North
- Tamworth
- Taunton & Wellington
- Telford
- The Wrekin
- Tooting
- Tottenham
- Tunbridge Wells
- Vale of Glamorgan
- Wallasey
- Walthamstow
- Warrington North
- Warrington South
- Warwick & Leamington
- Watford
- Wellingborough & Rushden
- West Bromwich
- West Dorset
- Weston-super-Mare
- West Suffolk
- Whitehaven & Workington
- Wigan
- Winchester
- Witham
- Witney
- Wokingham
- Wolverhampton West
- Worsley & Eccles
- Worthing West
- Wrexham
- Wycombe
- Wyre Forest
- Wythenshawe & Sale East
- Ynys Môn
- York Central

Trade Unions

- ASLEF
- CWU
- FBU

Socialist Societies

- Disability Labour
- East & South East Asians for Labour
- Labour Campaign for International Development
- Scientists for Labour
- SERA - Labour's Environment Campaign
- Socialist Education Association
- Socialist Health Association
- Society of Labour Lawyers

=== Other endorsements ===
Powell was endorsed by the soft-left Tribune Group of MPs, along with the left-wing Momentum recommending a tactical vote for Powell. Phillipson had the backing of groups representing the right wing of the party, including Labour First, Labour to Win and Progressive Britain.

Among the combined authority mayors, Claire Ward, Kim McGuinness and Richard Parker supported Phillipson, while Andy Burnham supported Powell.

The Red Wall Caucus supported a northern woman without making a specific endorsement for either of the two leading candidates. Powell also received the endorsement of the Co-operative Party.

Labour's largest Union, Unite, refused to endorse either candidate with the Unite General Secretary condemning the lack of choice on offer, and calling for "huge investment into our crumbling infrastructure and our public services, a pay rise for British workers".

== Opinion polling ==
=== Labour Party members ===
Phillipson vs Powell

Date(s) conducted	Pollster/client	Sample size	First preference			
Date(s) conducted	Pollster/client	Sample size	Phillipson	Powell	NOTA/ Don't know	Lead
17–22 Oct 2025	Survation/LabourList	1,005	40%	57%	3%	Powell +17
23–25 Sep 2025	Survation/LabourList	1,254	26%	57%	18%	Powell +31
23–25 Sep 2025	Survation/LabourList	1,254	33%	67%	—	Powell +34 (Note: "When those who are undecided were asked which candidate they leaned towards, Powell’s lead increased to a ratio of two to one over Phillipson, with 67% to 33% respectively.")
19–25 Sep 2025	YouGov/Sky News	704	28%	35%	35%	Powell +7
Sep 2025	Survation/LabourList & Peston	1,112	30%	47%	23%	Powell +17
Sep 2025	Survation/LabourList & Peston	1,112	39%	61%	—	Powell +22 (Note: "When those undecided voters were asked to choose between the two, the result was 61 per cent Powell, 39 per cent Phillipson.")

Multiple candidates

Date(s) conducted	Pollster/client	Sample size	First preference										
Date(s) conducted	Pollster/client	Sample size	Allin-Khan	Haigh	Lammy	Mahmood	Owen	Powell	Ribeiro-Addy	Streeting	Thornberry	NOTA	Lead
5–8 Sep 2025	Find Out Now	518	6%	5%	22%	3%	3%	3%	1%	13%	18%	25%	Lammy +4
5 Sep	Angela Rayner resigns from her cabinet roles and as Deputy Labour Leader												

== Results ==
The results were announced on 25 October 2025 by the Chair of the National Executive Committee Shabana Mahmood to a small audience, which could be watched live on YouTube. There were 970,642 eligible voters who had at least six months membership and were not in payment arrears: party members, socialist society members and members of affiliated trade unions who paid the political levy. 160,943 eligible votes were cast (16.6%), with 50 spoiled ballots. Turnout of party members and others was not given separately as in previous elections; historically most of those eligible were affiliated trade union members with a low turnout.

Lucy Powell was elected deputy leader with 87,407 votes (54.3%), with Bridget Phillipson receiving 73,536 votes (45.7%).

Candidate	Votes	%
Lucy Powell	87,407	54.3
Bridget Phillipson	73,536	45.7

== See also ==
- 1981 Labour Party deputy leadership election
- 2007 Labour Party deputy leadership election
- 2025 British cabinet reshuffle
