= List of organisations associated with the Labour Party (UK) =

This is a list of organisations that are associated with the Labour Party. Some are official party organisations, some (like the Co-operative Party) are independent organisations, and others are organisations made up of party members which are not officially recognised by the party. Socialist societies and affiliated trade unions are affiliated independent organisations, with voting and representational rights within the Labour Party.

== Partner organisations ==
- The Co-operative Party
- Labour Students
- Party of European Socialists
- Progressive Alliance
- Socialist International
- Trades Union Congress (TUC)
- Young Labour

== Magazines ==
- Chartist
- Tribune

== Think tanks and lobby groups ==
- Blue Labour - founded 2010, pressure group that advocates the idea that working-class voters will be won back to Labour through socially conservative ideas on specific social and international issues
- Campaign for Labour Party Democracy (CLPD) - founded 1973, group of Labour activists campaigning for changes to the constitution of the Labour Party to ensure that Labour MPs and Labour governments enacted policies agreeable to the party membership
- Campaign for Socialism - pressure group of Scottish Labour members and supporters
- Centre-Left Grassroots Alliance (CLGA) - founded 1998, centre-left group representing members of the Labour membership from the centre to the left
- Compass - founded 2003, think tank direction for the democratic left
- Fabian Society - founded 1884, think tank advancing the principles of democratic socialism via gradualist and reformist effort in democracies
- Independent Labour Publications (ILP) - founded 1975, pressure group which rejects contemporary capitalism and the command economy but accepts the idea of a market economy as part of democratic socialist thinking
- Institute for Public Policy Research (IPPR) - founded 1988, think tank which offers theoretical analysis for modernisers in the UK Labour Party; offering alternatives to free market fundamentalism
- Institute for Workers' Control - founded in 1968, shop stewards and militant workers who discussed workers' control of production
- Labour Campaign for Electoral Reform - founded 1980, a group of Labour politicians and grassroots members promoting democratic and constitutional reforms centred on proportional representation
- Labour First - founded 1988, pressure group representing non-Blairite traditional right who self-describe as moderates
- Labour for a Green New Deal - founded March 2019, a grassroots campaign to push the party to adopt a radical Green New Deal to transform the UK economy, tackle inequality and address the escalating climate crisis.
- Labour for a New Democracy - a coalition to secure a commitment to proportional representation for the House of Commons from the Labour Party.
- Labour for a Republic - founded in 2012, pressure group advocating the abolition of the monarchy in favour of an elected head of state and democratic republic
- Labour for Independence - founded in 2012, organisation for Scottish Labour supporters who believe Scottish independence will lead to a fairer society
- Labour for the Common Good - founded in 2015, and dedicated to fighting Corbynism and the party's far left
- Labour Left Briefing, monthly political magazine produced by members of the British Labour Party
- Labour Representation Committee (LRC) - founded 2004, pressure group fighting for power within the Labour Party and trade unions and to appeal to the electorate disillusioned and despaired by New Labour
- Mainstream - founded 2025, soft left platform of the Labour Party, It describes itself as the home of Labour's "radical realists" and promotes a democratic socialist platform including wealth taxation, democratic reform and public ownership of key utilities.
- Momentum - founded 2015, pressure group supportive of Jeremy Corbyn and the Labour Party
- Progress - founded in 1996, a pressure group standard-bearer for New Labour
- Red Wall Caucus - founded 2024, a parliamentary caucus and pressure group of red wall Labour MPs mainly focussed on opposing immigration.
- Socialist Campaign for a Labour Victory (SCLV) - founded 1978, refounded 2015 to campaign for a Labour government with clear working-class demands, to boost working-class confidence, and strengthen and transform the labour movement
- Socialist Campaign Group - founded 1982, left-wing, democratic socialist grouping of Labour MPs
- ThinkLabour- founded after the 2015 general election, formerly known as Labour Together and Common Good Labour, developed to assist Keir Starmer becoming leader and to support Labour in the 2024 United Kingdom general election

=== Defunct ===
- Campaign for Democratic Socialism (CDS) - 1960–1964, pressure group representing the right wing of the party of members who supported the then-party Labour leader, Hugh Gaitskell
- Clause Four Group - 1970s–1991, a group student politics set up to oppose Militant
- Future Britain Group - 2019–2021, a centre-left group of Labour MPs, founded in 2019 by Labour's former Deputy Leader, Tom Watson, to counter the party's far left
- Open Labour - 2015–2026, a forum aimed at renewing Labour's soft left
- The Manifesto Group - 1974–1981, a parliamentary alliance of Labour MPs founded in the 1970s, to combat the perceived leftwards drift of the party
- Labour Co-ordinating Committee (LCC) - 1978–1998, group established to challenge the leadership of the party from the left to the vanguard of Tony Blair's drive to modernise the party's organisation and policies
- Labour Solidarity Campaign - 1981–1988, a parliamentary alliance of Labour MPs, founded in 1981, dedicated to opposing the perceived growing influence of the party's far left
- Militant - 1964–1991, Trotskyist group

== Interest groups ==
- BAME Labour, formerly Labour Party Black Sections and Black Socialist Society
- Christians on the Left, formerly Christian Socialist Movement
- Disability Labour
- East and Southeast Asians for Labour
- Grassroots Black Left
- British Muslim Friends of Labour (BMFL)
- Hindus for Labour
- Jewish Labour Movement, formerly Poale Zion (Great Britain)
- Labour Against the War
- Labour and Palestine
- Labour Campaign for Drug Policy Reform (LCDPR)
- Labour Campaign for Electoral Reform (LCER)
- Labour Campaign for Human Rights (LCTR)
- Labour Campaign for Trans Rights
- Labour CND
- Labour for a Republic
- Labour for Trans Rights
- Labour Friends of Israel
- Labour Friends of Kosovo & the Western Balkans
- Labour Friends of Palestine & the Middle East
- Labour Growth Group
- Labour Housing Group
- Labour Leave
- Labour Movement for Europe
- Labour Muslim Network
- Labour Party Irish Society
- Labour Land Campaign
- Labour Middle East Council
- Labour Party Marxists
- Labour Women's Network
- LGBT+ Labour
- National Union of Labour and Socialist Clubs
- Scientists for Labour
- Socialist Educational Association
- Socialist Environment and Resources Association (SERA)
- Socialist Health Association
- Tribune Group of MPs - soft left group of MPs

== See also ==
- Labour Party (UK) affiliated trade union
- Socialist society (Labour Party)
