= Socialist Educational Association =

Educational organisation in the UK

- Abbreviation: SEA
- Formation: 1920s
- Type: Socialist society
- Headquarters: London, England
- Location: United Kingdom
- President: Diane Reay
- Chair: Carmen Peruga
- General secretary: James Whiting
- Affiliations: Labour Party
- Website: socialisteducationalassociation.org
- Formerly called: National Association of Labour Teachers

The Socialist Educational Association (SEA) is a socialist educational organisation in the United Kingdom. It is affiliated to the Labour Party as a socialist society. It assists in the development of and monitors educational policies of the Labour Party. It aims to promote non-selective education, equality of opportunity and lifelong availability of adequate educational provision throughout the UK. It believes in all compulsory education being free and adequately resourced. It seeks to enlist the support of the trade union and co-operative movements and to encourage support for a socialist vision of education amongst teaching staff.

The association was founded as the National Association of Labour Teachers in the 1920s, but grew into a broader church and was renamed the 'Socialist Educational Association'. The association is based in London and is active in England and Wales. It is organised on a structure of branches, each branch being loosely based on a local education authority area. The association has a national executive committee that meets eight times a year. This is composed of nationally elected members: officers, plus eight women and eight men; together with delegates from the branches. The association also holds an annual conference in June each year. Caroline Benn was, for a time, the SEA president.

Former general secretaries have included Graham Lane and Malcolm Horne. Martin Dore, who served from 2008 until 2014, was succeeded by John Bolt. Melissa Benn is a vice president of the association. Professor Richard Pring was the association's president from 2008 until he retired from that position in June 2017. The following month, it was announced that the association's new president was to be Professor Selina Todd of Oxford University. Selina Todd was succeeded in 2022 by Professor Diane Reay of Cambridge University. Following the retirement of John Bolt as General Secretary, James Whiting was elected as his successor at the AGM held in June 2019.

== Presidents ==
- 2008–2017: Richard Pring
- 2017–2022: Selina Todd
- 2022 – to present: Diane Reay

== General Secretaries ==
- -2007 Malcolm Horne
- 2007–2008 Richard Sidley
- 2008–2014: Martin Dore
- 2014–2019 John Bolt
- 2019–present: James Whiting

== See also ==
- Labour Party (UK) affiliated trade union
- List of organisations associated with the Labour Party (UK)
