= Disability Labour =

Socialist society associated with the UK Labour Party

- Formation: 1996; 30 years ago
- Headquarters: London, England
- Location: United Kingdom
- Members: 1,300 (according to email from organisation) (2021)
- Chair: Kathy Bole
- Affiliations: Labour Party
- Website: disabilitylabour.org.uk

Disability Labour is a socialist society associated with the UK Labour Party. Disability Labour seeks to represent and support disabled Labour members and supporters. They are an independent policy-making group on disability with further "aims to support and develop disabled party members to serve as policymakers, ministers and elected officials".

== Membership ==
Group membership is free to disabled Labour members and their carers.

Individual, CLP, and trade union affiliation is offered with Unison an example of a trade union affiliate to Disability Labour.

== History ==
=== 2015 ===
In 2015, Disability Labour was relaunched - announced in the 2015 Labour Party conference.

=== 2018 ===
In 2018 the executive committee of Disability Labour was widely replaced with members from the Disability Equality Act Labour (DEAL) campaign group after tensions over the previous executive committee.

The same year also saw the co-chair Fran Springfield criticising the UK's Department for Work and Pensions endorsement of Purple Tuesday, a disability-awareness day for retail establishments, for fears it would lead to greater discrimination.

=== 2025 ===
In 2025, Disability Labour announced it had been priced out of attending Labour Party Conference in Liverpool after the Labour Party removed its financial support, making it the first time since 2018 they had been asked to pay for a space at the conference.

== See also ==
- Disability in the United Kingdom
- Disability Rights UK
