= Labour Party Irish Society =

Socialist Society

- Headquarters: London, United Kingdom
- Location: One Brewer's Green, London SW1H 0RH
- Official language: English
- Chair: Kane Emerson
- Affiliations: Labour Party
- Website: www.labourirish.org.uk

The Labour Party Irish Society is a socialist society affiliated to the British Labour Party. It is a collective body of Labour Party members of Irish birth or descent, and those interested in Ireland and Irish affairs. It promotes the interests of the Irish in Britain as a whole, and encourages Irish people to become involved in the Labour Party and politics generally. Former chair of the society and former Labour Communications Director, Matthew Doyle, has also said that it works to "ensure that the relationship between Britain and Ireland is marked by mutual respect and friendship rather than the prejudice, discrimination and violence of the past."

In recent years the society has campaigned on extending abortion and same-sex marriage rights to Northern Ireland, as well as working on the repeal the 8th campaign in the Republic of Ireland. The society was also involved in campaigning for the Irish Labour Party in the 2020 general election.
