= Socialist society (Labour Party) =

Type of organisation affiliated to the UK Labour Party

A socialist society is a membership organisation that is affiliated with the Labour Party in the UK.

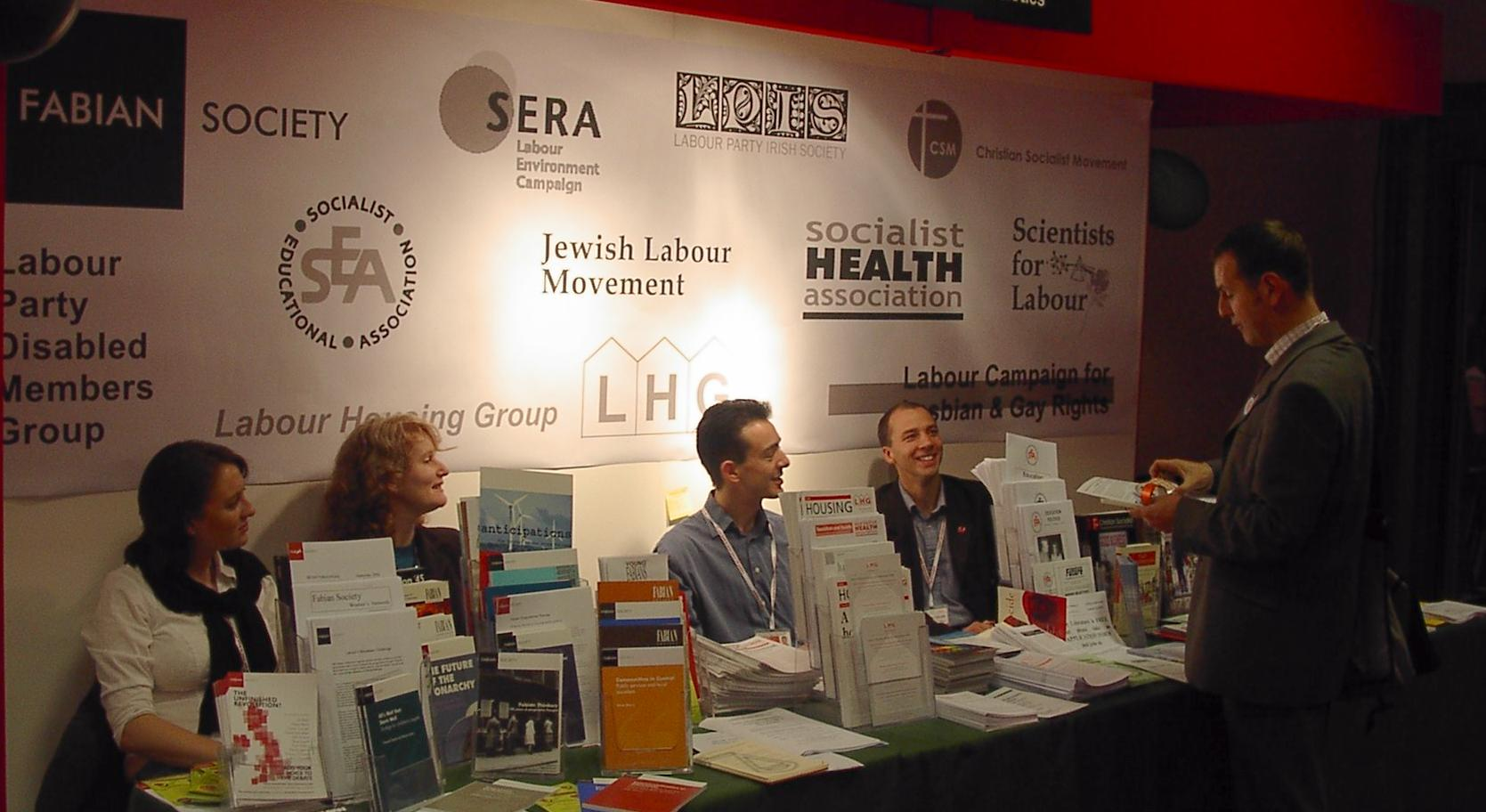
Socialist society stall at Labour Party Conference 2004

The best-known and oldest socialist society is the Fabian Society, founded in 1884, some years before the creation of the Labour Party itself (in which the Society participated). The Society's membership is relatively small (around 7000) but it exerts much influence in Labour circles. The Co-operative Party is not strictly a "socialist society" in the context of the Labour Party; it is in fact a separate party with an electoral agreement with Labour. It acts as a socialist society for the most part although it has certain additional rights.

Affiliation means that the socialist societies – like a number of British trade unions – pay an affiliation fee to the Labour Party, and the affiliates' members become affiliated supporters of the Labour Party (a different status from full member), unless they specifically choose otherwise. In return the societies receive a formal role in Labour decision-making, and the affiliated supporters can take part in all-member ballots in certain circumstances. For example, they can participate in the election of Labour Party leaders and deputy leaders, have delegates and votes at Annual Conference.

Socialist societies also elect a delegate (currently James Asser) to the Labour National Executive Committee and can affiliate at a local level to Constituency Labour Parties. A second seat was allotted to BAME Labour in early 2007, when its membership rose above 2,500. The Socialist Societies also elect three representatives to the National Policy Forum; currently, these are Sina Lari, Andrew Harrop and Paul Clarkson. Since the 2011 'refounding Labour' process, seats on the NPF have also been allocated to LGBT+ Labour and the Disability Labour. Each Socialist Society can nominate, and since 2015 Socialist Society members can vote individually, in the Labour leader and deputy leader elections.

The socialist societies are also involved in the Labour Party's policy reviews, and the work of the Socialist Societies is co-ordinated by the Socialist Societies Executive. This is a regular meeting of the chairs and key officers of all the societies to share ideas and co-ordinate work. These meetings also co-ordinate regular meetings with senior Labour Party officials and MPs.

As a collective, the societies try to co-ordinate campaigning work and hold a joint event at Labour Party conference. A small group of officers are elected to co-ordinate this work. The current committee is:

- Chair – Claire Reynolds (Labour Women's Network)
- Vice-Chair (Development / Campaigns) – Liam Conlon (Labour Party Irish Society)
- Vice-Chair (Policy) – Mike Buckley (Labour Campaign for International Development)
- Secretary – Katie Curtis (Fabian Society)
- Treasurer – Chris Wongsosaputro (East & South East Asians for Labour)

== Current socialist societies ==
As of January 2025, there are 20 affiliated socialist societies.

In chronological order:

- Fabian Society
- Jewish Labour Movement, (formerly Poale Zion)
- National Union of Labour and Socialist Clubs
- Socialist Educational Association
- Socialist Health Association
- Society of Labour Lawyers
- Christians on the Left (formerly The Christian Socialist Movement)
- Labour Business (formerly Labour Finance and Industry Group)
- Socialist Environment and Resources Association (SERA)- Labour's Environmental Campaign
- LGBT+ Labour
- Labour Housing Group
- Labour Movement for Europe
- Black, Asian Minority Ethnic Labour (BAME Labour) (formerly Labour Party Black Sections and Black Socialist Society)
- Labour Women's Network
- Labour Animal Welfare Society
- Scientists for Labour
- East & South East Asians for Labour
- Labour Campaign for International Development
- Disability Labour (formerly Labour Party Disabled Members Group)
- Labour Party Irish Society

There are other organisations, such as Labour Arts Alliance, Muslims for Labour and Labour Humanists, which are not formally affiliated to the Labour Party but act as campaign groups for Labour Party members in the same way as the affiliates, but have yet to apply for affiliation or have decided not to do so.

Young Labour and Labour Students are not socialist societies, and retain separate places within the Labour Party as national branches for young and student members.

== See also ==
- Labour Party (UK) affiliated trade union
- List of organisations associated with the Labour Party (UK)
- Socialism
