= Regulatory Reform Committee =

The Regulatory Reform Committee was a select committee of the House of Commons in the Parliament of the United Kingdom. The remit of the committee was to examine subordinate provisions to amend primary legislation as created under the Deregulation and Contracting Out Act 1994, amended by the Regulatory Reform Act 2001. It ceased to exist on 20 May 2021, with responsibilities being transferred to the Business, Energy and Industrial Strategy Committee.

== Chairs ==
Committee chairs include those listed below.

Name	Start	End	Party	Constituency
Peter Pike	16 July 2001	11 April 2005	Labour	Burnley
Andrew Miller	18 July 2005	6 May 2010	Labour	Ellesmere Port and Neston
Robert Syms	27 July 2010	3 December 2012	Conservative	Poole
James Duddridge	3 December 2012	12 September 2014	Conservative	Southend East and Rochford
Lee Scott	14 October 2014	30 March 2015	Conservative	Ilford North
Andrew Bridgen	21 October 2015	3 May 2017	Conservative	North West Leicestershire
Stephen McPartland	28 November 2017	20 May 2021	Conservative	Stevenage

== Membership ==
At dissolution, the members of the committee were as follows:

Member	Party	Constituency
Stephen McPartland MP (chair)	Conservative	Stevenage
Chris Clarkson MP	Conservative	Heywood & Middleton
Jackie Doyle-Price MP	Conservative	Thurrock
Mark Eastwood MP	Conservative	Dewsbury
Julie Elliott MP	Labour	Sunderland Central
Mark Garnier MP	Conservative	Wyre Forest
Sir Oliver Heald MP	Conservative	Hertfordshire NE
Kevan Jones MP	Labour	Durham North
Anthony Mangnall MP	Conservative	Totnes
Conor McGinn MP	Labour	St Helens North
Gary Sambrook MP	Conservative	Birmingham, Northfield
Karl Turner MP	Labour	Kingston upon Hull East

Source: Reform Committee

== 2017–2019 Parliament ==
Members were announced on 6 November 2017.

Member	Party	Constituency
Bim Afolami MP	Conservative	Hitchin and Harpenden
Andrew Bridgen MP	Conservative	North West Leicestershire
Douglas Chapman MP	SNP	Dunfermline and West Fife
Julie Elliott MP	Labour	Sunderland Central
Kirstene Hair MP	Conservative	Angus
Simon Hoare MP	Conservative	North Dorset
Graham Jones MP	Labour	Hyndburn
Helen Jones MP	Labour	Warrington North
Kevan Jones MP	Labour	North Durham
Conor McGinn MP	Labour	St Helens North
Stephen McPartland MP	Conservative	Stevenage
Mark Menzies MP	Conservative	Fylde
Jeremy Quin MP	Conservative	Horsham
Karl Turner MP	Labour	Kingston upon Hull East

=== Changes 2017–2019 ===
Date	Outgoing Member & Party	Constituency	→	New Member & Party	Constituency	Source
16 January 2017	Andrew Percy MP (Conservative)	Brigg and Goole	→	Stephen McPartland MP (Conservative)	Stevenage	Hansard
16 January 2017	Christopher Pincher MP (Conservative)	Tamworth	→	Mark Menzies MP (Conservative)	Fylde	Hansard
18 December 2017	Mark Menzies MP (Conservative)	Fylde	→	Simon Clarke MP (Conservative)	Middlesbrough South and East Cleveland	Hansard
5 November 2018	Jeremy Quin MP (Conservative)	Horsham	→	Ben Bradley MP (Conservative)	Mansfield	Hansard

== 2015–2017 Parliament ==
Members were announced on 12 October 2015.

Member	Party	Constituency
Andrew Bridgen MP	Conservative	North West Leicestershire
Richard Fuller MP	Conservative	North East Bedfordshire
Rebecca Harris MP	Conservative	Castle Point
Simon Hoare MP	Conservative	North Dorset
Dr Rupa Huq MP	Labour	Ealing Central and Acton
Imran Hussain MP	Labour	Bradford East
Rob Marris MP	Labour	Wolverhampton South West
Michael Meacher MP	Labour	Oldham West and Royton
Wendy Morton MP	Conservative	Aldridge-Brownhills
Roger Mullin MP	SNP	Kirkcaldy and Cowdenbeath
Andrew Percy MP	Conservative	Brigg and Goole
Christopher Pincher MP	Conservative	Tamworth
Jeremy Quin MP	Conservative	Horsham
Andrew Smith MP	Labour	Oxford East

=== Changes 2015–2017 ===
Date	Outgoing Member & Party	Constituency	→	New Member & Party	Constituency	Source
21 October 2015	Michael Meacher MP (Labour)	Oldham West and Royton	→	Vacant		Death of member
16 January 2017	Andrew Percy MP (Conservative)	Brigg and Goole	→	Stephen McPartland MP (Conservative)	Stevenage	Hansard
16 January 2017	Christopher Pincher MP (Conservative)	Tamworth	→	Mark Menzies MP (Conservative)	Fylde	Hansard

== 2010–2015 Parliament ==
Members were announced on 26 July 2010.

Member	Party	Constituency
Heidi Alexander MP	Labour	Lewisham East
David Anderson MP	Labour	Blaydon
Andrew Bridgen MP	Conservative	North West Leicestershire
Jack Dromey MP	Labour	Birmingham Erdington
Lilian Greenwood MP	Labour	Nottingham South
Ben Gummer MP	Conservative	Ipswich
John Hemming MP	Liberal Democrats	Birmingham Yardley
Gordon Henderson MP	Conservative	Sittingbourne and Sheppey
Andrew Jones MP	Conservative	Harrogate and Knaresborough
Ian Lavery MP	Labour	Wansbeck
Brandon Lewis MP	Conservative	Great Yarmouth
Andrew Percy MP	Conservative	Brigg and Goole
Robert Syms MP	Conservative	Poole
Valerie Vaz MP	Labour	Walsall South

=== Changes 2010–2015 ===
Date	Outgoing Member & Party	Constituency	→	New Member & Party	Constituency	Source
3 December 2012	Robert Syms MP (Conservative)	Poole	→	James Duddridge MP (Conservative)	Rochford and Southend East	Hansard
3 December 2012	Ben Gummer MP (Conservative)	Ipswich	→	Richard Fuller MP (Conservative)	Bedford	Hansard
3 December 2012	Brandon Lewis MP (Conservative)	Great Yarmouth	→	Rebecca Harris MP (Conservative)	Castle Point	Hansard
12 September 2014	James Duddridge MP (Conservative)	Rochford and Southend East	→	Lee Scott MP (Conservative)	Ilford North	Hansard

== See also ==
- Parliamentary committees of the United Kingdom
