= Labour Women's Network =

- Full name: Labour Women's Network
- Short name: LWN
- Chair: Thangam Debbonaire
- Founded: 1988
- Headquarters: Southside, 105 Victoria Street, London SW1E 6QT; Labour Central, Kings Manor, Newcastle upon Tyne NE1 6PA
- Ideology: Social democracy
- Political position: Centre-left
- National affiliation: Labour Party
- European affiliation: PES Women; Party of European Socialists
- International affiliation: Progressive Alliance

Website
- www.lwn.org.uk

The Labour Women's Network (LWN) is the socialist society officially representing the women's wing of the Labour Party in the United Kingdom. It is a grassroots group which provides campaigning, training and support for women within the party.

== History ==
The organisation was founded in 1988, with the aim of helping more women in the Labour Party to be chosen as candidates, and become elected as members of parliament. The Labour Women's Network was started by four women: Barbara Follett, Barbara Roche, Hilary De Lyon and Jean Black following the 1987 United Kingdom general election, which saw a very low number of women being elected to the British parliament.

In 2011, Jo Cox was elected as the first ever LWN chair, until she was elected member of parliament for Batley and Spen in 2015. Following her death, the Labour Party and Labour Women's Network started the 'Jo Cox Women in Leadership Scheme', which would help invest in training for women within the party.

== Purpose ==
The Labour Women's Network is a big tent organisation which accepts women with different views of women issues within the Labour Party. It does not make policy, however its prime purpose is to help and provide training for women who wish to stand for public office in both local and national politics. The organisation is a member of PES Women, the women's wing of the Party of European Socialists.

== Structure ==
The LWN is a socialist society: one of 20 (as of 2025) organisations recognised by the Labour Party which "give Labour members a stronger sense of belonging within the Party, and help them find their political home and voice".

The organisation is run by a general committee, with elections taking place every year. Any woman can stand for election providing they have been a member for at least 4 months before proceedings begin. Committee members serve a 2 year term, unless there is a by-election.

=== Committee ===
The committee of the Labour Women's Network, as of December 2024 was:

Position	Name
Chair	Thangam Debbonaire
Secretary	Kiran Mahil
Treasurer	Cllr Katherine Dunne
Training Lead	Nan Sloane
Committee member	Cllr Sharon Thompson
Committee member	Ashley Dalton, MP
Committee member	Cllr Anntoinette Bramble
Committee member	Cllr Rosa Bolger
Committee member	Cllr Ellie Cumbo
Committee member	Cllr Sara Hyde
Committee member	Catriona Ogilvy
