= Stephen McPartland =

British politician

The Right Honourable Stephen McPartland PC
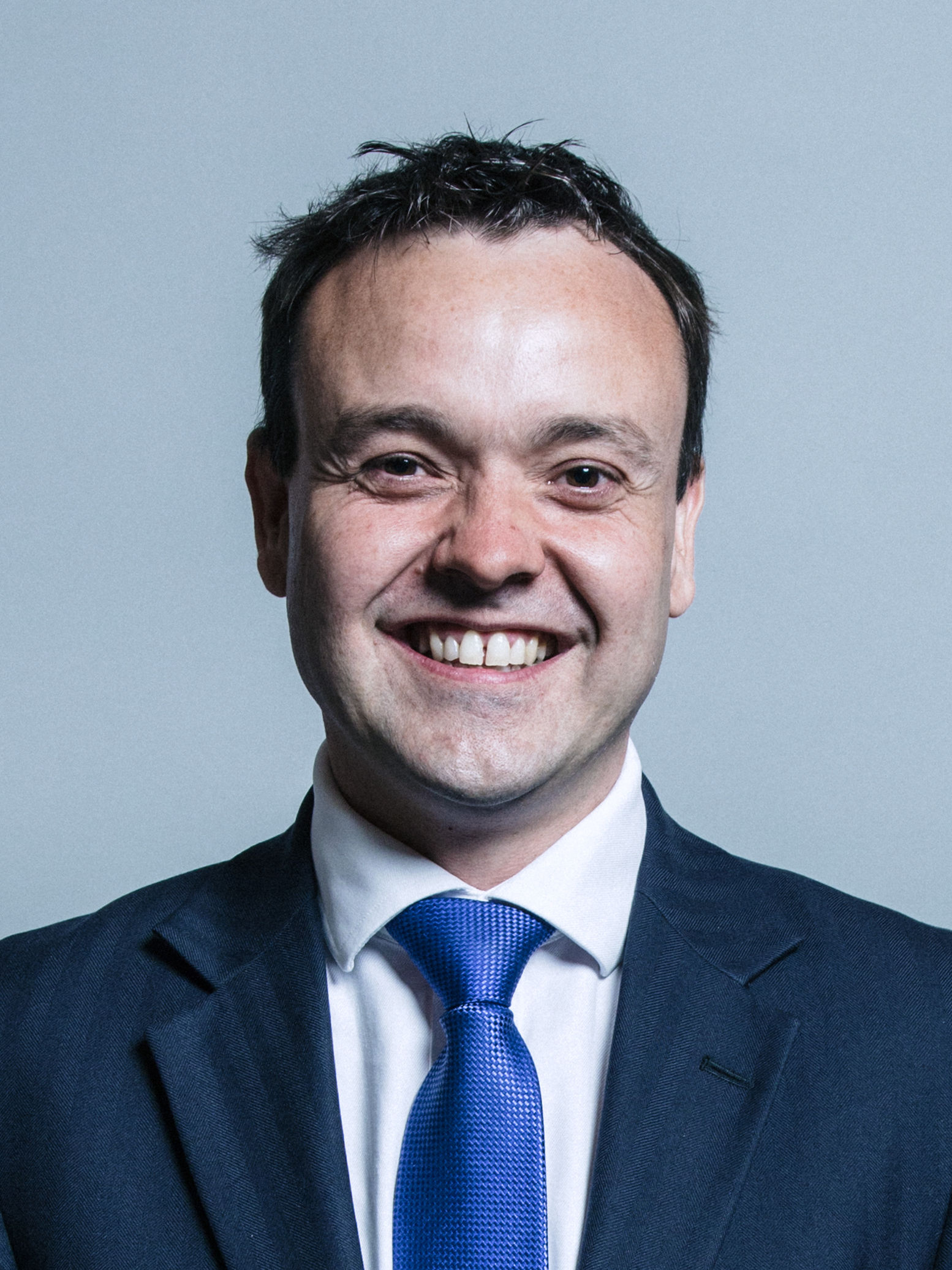
- Official portrait, 2017

Minister of State for Security
- In office 7 July 2022 – 6 September 2022
- Prime Minister: Boris Johnson
- Preceded by: Damian Hinds
- Succeeded by: Tom Tugendhat

Chair of the Regulatory Reform Committee
- In office 28 November 2017 – 20 May 2021
- Preceded by: Andrew Bridgen
- Succeeded by: Office abolished

Member of Parliament for Stevenage
- In office 6 May 2010 – 30 May 2024
- Preceded by: Barbara Follett
- Succeeded by: Kevin Bonavia

Personal details
- Born: Stephen Anthony McPartland; 9 August 1976 (age 50) Liverpool, Merseyside, England
- Party: Conservative
- Spouse: Emma McPartland
- Education: University of Liverpool (BA); Liverpool John Moores University (MSc)
- Occupation: Politician
- Website: Official website

Stephen Anthony McPartland (born 9 August 1976) is a former British Conservative Party Member of Parliament (MP) for Stevenage from 2010 to 2024. He is the author of the McPartland Review into Cyber Security as an enabler of Economic Growth, is a strategic consultant and non-executive specialist in risk, governance, cyber security and digital sustainability.

== Early life ==
Born in Liverpool on 9 August 1976, McPartland read History at the University of Liverpool, graduating in 1997. He studied for an MSc in Technology Management at Liverpool John Moores University in 1998. After graduating in 1999, he worked for the Conservative Party in Warrington, where he managed a range of local council, parliamentary and European election campaigns, before he moved to Hertfordshire in 2001 to work as a campaign manager. Prior to being elected as an MP, McPartland was the Director of Membership for British American Business (the US Chamber of Commerce), based in London.

== Parliamentary career ==
McPartland won the parliamentary seat of Stevenage at the 2010 general election, with a swing of 8% after the sitting Labour MP Barbara Follett stood down. He was re-elected at the 2015 general election, 2017 general election and 2019 general election.

McPartland's political interests include Cyber Security, AI, welfare and health care, with a particular focus on cancer treatment and respiratory diseases; education, science and technology, including satellite technology; international trade; policing; addiction treatment; urban regeneration; and government procurement of IT projects.

He had a Parliamentary Select Committee career serving on the Science and Technology Select Committee, the Finance Select Committee (Commons), was elected Chair of the Regulatory Reform Select Committee, and also became a member of the Liaison Select Committee. His final position was as a member of the Joint Committee on the National Security Strategy until he retired from Parliament.

He sat on a number of Bill Committees and was on the Board of the Parliamentary Office of Science and Technology from 2015.

Throughout his Parliamentary career, McPartland was involved with the running of several all-party parliamentary groups (APPGs). He was Chair of the Allergy APPG, Child and Youth Crime APPG, Child Health and Vaccine Preventable Diseases APPG, Furniture Industry APPG and Respiratory Health APPG, and Vice Chair of the Disability APPG. As Chair of the Respiratory Health APPG, McPartland led an inquiry into respiratory deaths and noted that the UK has the worst death rate of OECD countries and that most deaths of children from asthma are preventable. He also successfully campaigned to change the law from 1 October 2014 to allow emergency inhalers for asthma attacks to be kept in schools.

McPartland was Parliamentary Private Secretary to the Minister of State for Trade and Investment, Lord Livingston, in 2014–15.

McPartland initiated a parliamentary inquiry into electronic invoicing in the public sector; it delivered its findings in June 2014. He has also called for greater interoperability, with the launch of an Interoperability Charter in April 2013, to encourage and recognise best practice in delivering the Digital Economy.

McPartland campaigned against corporate tax avoidance, including, in 2015, writing to all of the FTSE100 CEOs to ask whether they would be willing to support greater tax transparency.

McPartland has worked closely with Sir Oliver Heald to campaign for Finn's Law, to provide emergency service animals with greater protection after Police Dog Finn was stabbed in Stevenage in 2016.

McPartland has been outspoken on welfare issues and has garnered respect for his knowledge of the technical changes involved, leading the successful campaigns against changes to Tax Credits, improvements to Universal Credit and protecting the self-employed against changes to Employers National Insurance Contributions. He has been an outspoken critic of his own party in Government at times and successfully campaigned to improve Building Safety nationally, the McPartland-Smith amendments were supported by leaseholders and cladding groups.

McPartland supported Brexit in the 2016 EU membership referendum.

On 7 July 2022, he was appointed Minister of State for Security at the Home Office as part of the caretaker government installed by outgoing Prime Minister Boris Johnson, tasked with taking the National Security Act through Bill Committee. He was made a privy councillor upon his appointment. He was not reappointed by the incoming Prime Minister Liz Truss and returned to the backbenches.

In January 2023 he was the only Conservative MP to vote against the Government on the Second Reading of the Strikes (Minimum Service Levels) Bill, describing it as "shameful" and an attack on individual trade union members.

In February 2023, McPartland announced that he would seek re-election at the next general election, which was subsequently held in July 2024.

== Other work ==
From 2014 until 2015, McPartland served as chairman of The Furniture Ombudsman, a not-for-profit, industry-wide customer disputes resolution body. McPartland was a Trustee of The Living Room Charity, which offers a wide range of free addiction treatment services, and a Patron of the Turn the Tide project. He was a Patron of Trailblazers, a national charity that reduces re-offending among young people through providing volunteer mentors.

== Post-parliamentary career ==
After leaving parliament in 2024, McPartland setup Green Cyber Research.

== Personal life ==
McPartland lives in Stevenage with his wife, Emma, who was a Special Educational Needs Co-Ordinator (SENCo) at a local primary school and provides expert advice at tribunals.

Parliament of the United Kingdom
Preceded by Barbara Follett	Member of Parliament for Stevenage; 2010–2024	Succeeded by Kevin Bonavia
Preceded by Damian Hinds	Minister of State for Security; 2022	Succeeded by Tom Tugendhat
