= Barbara Follett (politician) =

British Labour Party politician (born 1942)

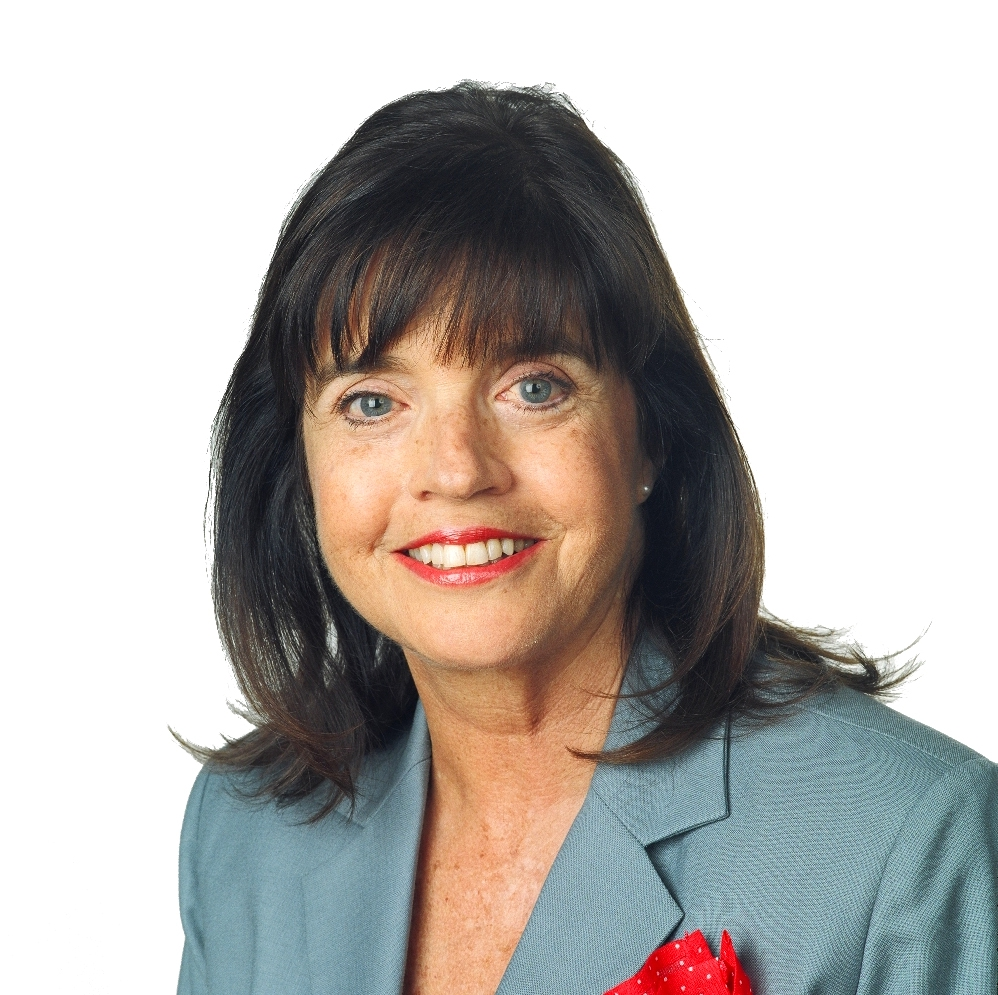
- Official portrait, 2009

Minister for the East of England
- In office 28 June 2007 – 11 May 2010
- Prime Minister: Gordon Brown
- Succeeded by: Office abolished
- Preceded by: Office established

Parliamentary Under-Secretary of State for Communities and Local Government
- In office 22 September 2009 – 11 May 2010
- Prime Minister: Gordon Brown
- Preceded by: Sarah McCarthy-Fry
- Succeeded by: Andrew Stunell

Parliamentary Under-Secretary of State for Culture and Tourism
- In office 4 October 2008 – 22 September 2009
- Prime Minister: Gordon Brown
- Preceded by: Margaret Hodge
- Succeeded by: Margaret Hodge

Parliamentary Under-Secretary of State for Equality
- In office 24 November 2007 – 4 October 2008
- Prime Minister: Gordon Brown
- Preceded by: Office established
- Succeeded by: Maria Eagle

Parliamentary Under-Secretary of State for Work and Pensions
- In office 28 June 2007 – 24 November 2007 Serving with James Plaskitt
- Prime Minister: Gordon Brown
- Preceded by: James Plaskitt
- Succeeded by: James Plaskitt

Member of Parliament for Stevenage
- In office 1 May 1997 – 12 April 2010
- Preceded by: Tim Wood
- Succeeded by: Stephen McPartland

Personal details
- Born: Daphne Barbara Hubbard; 25 December 1942 (age 83) Kingston, Colony of Jamaica
- Party: Labour
- Spouses: Richard Turner (m. 1963; div. 1970) Gerald Stonestreet (m. 1970–1974) Les Broer (m. 1974–1985) Ken Follett (m. 1985)
- Children: 3, including Jann Turner
- Education: Sandford School, Addis Ababa, Ethiopia; Ellerslie Girls' High School, Sea Point, Cape Town; University of Cape Town; London School of Economics; Open University
- Website: http://www.barbara-follett.org.uk/

Daphne Barbara Follett (née Hubbard; born 25 December 1942) is a British Labour Party politician who served as Member of Parliament (MP) for Stevenage from 1997 to 2010. During this time she held several parliamentary and ministerial positions.

In the decade before entering Parliament she played a major part in transforming of the Labour Party, both by making members more aware of their visual impact on voters and also by co-founding and running two organisations, Labour Women's Network and Emily's List UK, which spearheaded reforms that helped Labour to return a record 101 women to Parliament in 1997.

Following the United Kingdom parliamentary expenses scandal, she repaid more than £42,000 that she had claimed in expenses; hers was the largest repayment made by any MP. She stood down from Parliament in 2010 in order to take over running the business of her husband, author Ken Follett.

== Background ==
Follett was born Daphne Barbara Hubbard in Kingston, Jamaica, where her father (originally from Manchester, UK) was an insurance executive. In 1946 the family returned to Britain, first to Jersey then in 1947 to Billericay, Essex. In 1952 the family moved to Ethiopia where her father set up the country's first insurance company in partnership with Emperor Haile Selassie. In 1957 after an unfortunate incident involving her alcoholic father, a toast and a drinks trolley, the family were asked to leave the country and went to Cape Town in South Africa. She began a university degree in art, but in 1962 had to give it up and started work with Barclays Bank.

She married Richard Turner in 1963 and they moved to Paris, where Turner studied for his doctorate and she taught at the Berlitz School of Languages (1963–64). In 1964 her first daughter, Jann, was born. They returned to South Africa in 1966 to run his mother's fruit farm in Stellenbosch, where they had their second daughter, Kim. In 1969, after experiencing first-hand the hardships of life for farm workers in rural South Africa, she started working for Kupugani (Zulu for "uplift yourself"), an organisation which bought and processed agricultural surplus and then sold it cheaply to poor families. It also provided basic health and education.

In 1970, on the breakdown of her marriage, Follett moved back to Cape Town and became acting Regional Secretary at the Institute of Race Relations. She worked again for Kupugani from 1971 to 1978, first as Regional Manager for the Cape and South-West Africa (now Namibia) – then as National Health Education Director (1975–78).

After a brief marriage to Gerald Stonestreet, she married architect Les Broer in 1974. Their son Adam was born in 1975. In January 1978, her ex-husband Richard Turner, a prominent anti-apartheid activist, was assassinated.

Three months later, Follett, who was then running the Women's Movement for Peace was told that she too was about to be "banned". She and her children fled to England and lived in Farnham, Surrey. Follett found work as Assistant Course Organiser and lecturer on Africa for the Farnham-based Centre for International Briefing (1980–84) and joined the local Labour Party.

== Political career ==
Follett stood as Labour candidate for Woking in the 1983 general election, but was not elected. In 1985 she married author Ken Follett. From 1984 to 1992 she was a freelance lecturer and consultant, contesting Epsom and Ewell for Labour in 1987, again unsuccessfully. Unhappy with the inequalities that women faced in public life, she joined the Fawcett Society and the National Alliance of Women's Organisations and jointly founded the Labour Women's Network in 1987, on whose Steering Committee she has served ever since.

Inspired by women in the US, Follett imported the idea of EMILYs List, a fundraiser for women Democrat candidates, into Britain for the Labour Party. She became the Director of EMILY's List UK in 1993. The organisation has since backed more than 80 women seeking selection. During this period she obtained a BSc (Econ) in Economic History from the London School of Economics. She was selected as the candidate in Stevenage (1995) before her postgraduate course could get under way. She concentrated instead on work as visiting fellow at the Institute of Public Policy Research (1993–97).

Follett is also an alumna of the Open University and she has since become a patron of Action on Pre-Eclampsia.

=== In Parliament ===
The 1997 general election saw Follett elected as MP for Stevenage. In Parliament she went on the Select Committee on International Development, as well as becoming Chair of the All Party Retail Industry Group; Chair of the Eastern Group of Labour MPs; Chair of the Eastern Region of Labour Movement in Europe; Vice-Chair of the Parliamentary Film Industries Group; a member of Labour's backbench Treasury Committee; Joint Secretary of the Population, Development and Reproductive Health Group; and Treasurer of the Sex Equality Group. She is also a member of the Fabian Society.

In May 1999, Follett became a member of the Britain in Europe Council, and served on the Select Committee on Modernisation of the House of Commons. In June 2005, she was elected as Chair of the Parliamentary Labour Party (PLP) Women's Committee. In November 2005, she became Parliamentary private secretary to Tessa Jowell.

In June 2007 she was appointed to become Minister for the East of England, and, in October 2007, Parliamentary Under-Secretary of Equality, supporting the Minister for Women and Equalities, Harriet Harman, with a particular role in drafting the government's equality legislation. She then went on to serve as Minister for Culture, Tourism and the Creative Industries between October 2008 and September 2009, before finally serving as Parliamentary Under-Secretary at the Department for Communities and Local Government until May 2010.

Following the controversy generated by the public disclosure of her expenses Follett announced her decision to stand down at the 2010 general election on 1 October 2009. She cited a desire to spend more time with her family as her motivation for standing down.

=== Election results since 1997 ===
Election	Constituency	Party	Votes (%)	Position
General 1997	Stevenage	Labour	28,440 (55.3%)	1
General 2001	Stevenage	Labour	22,025 (51.9%)	1
General 2005	Stevenage	Labour	18,003 (42.9%)	1

=== Parliamentary positions ===
- Chair of the Parliamentary Labour Party Women's Committee (June 2005)
- Parliamentary Private Secretary to the Minister for Women, Rt Hon Tessa Jowell (June 2005 - May 2006)
- Parliamentary Private Secretary to the Secretary of State for Culture, Media and Sport, Rt Hon Tessa Jowell (May 2006 - June 2007)
- Parliamentary Private Secretary to the Minister for Women, Rt Hon Ruth Kelly (May 2006)
- Minister for the East of England (June 2007 - May 2010)
- Parliamentary Under-Secretary of State, Department for Work and Pensions (June 2007 - October 2008)
- Parliamentary Under-Secretary of Equality (October 2007 - October 2008)
- Minister for Culture, Tourism and the Creative Industries (October 2008 - September 2009)
- Parliamentary Under-Secretary at the Department for Communities and Local Government (September 2009 - May 2010)

=== Post-parliamentary career ===
Follett was awarded an Honorary Doctorate in Law from the University of Hertfordshire, in November 2010. She remains committed to women's issues and is a member of the White Ribbon Alliance and the Abortion Rights Campaign.

Follett is married to the international bestselling author Ken Follett and since leaving politics, has been CEO of the Follett Office which is based in Stevenage. She is also Follett's agent.

Follett is a Director of the Jumby Bay Island Company, based in Antigua, and a member of the Labour Women's Network Management Committee.

In 2023, The Guardian reported that Follett had begun donating larger amounts to the Labour Party, having previously been a major donor during the periods the party was led by Tony Blair and Ed Miliband.

== Organisations ==
Follett is a member of, and active in, a number of organisations:

- Abortion Law Reform Association
- ACTSA - Action for Southern Africa (ACTSA) campaigns with the people of Southern Africa as they strive to build a better future.
- EMILY's List UK - launched on 6 February 1993, this gives women Labour Party members the financial support they need to be selected as Parliamentary candidates.
- Fabian Society
- Fawcett Society
- Labour Campaign for Electoral Reform
- Labour Women's Network - Encouraging women to come forward as UK parliamentary candidates.
- Liberty (pressure group)
- Royal Society of Arts
- SERA
- Stevenage Credit Union - The Credit Union is used by local people to save money and also to borrow money up to £5,000 at a reasonable rate of interest.
- The White Ribbon Alliance for Safe Motherhood

== Brass Eye ==
In 2001, Follett appeared in the television satire programme Brass Eye, in a special which satirised media hysteria towards the issue of paedophilia. In the programme, she was duped into giving fake warnings about an online game called "Pantu the dog", claiming on camera that a paedophile had converted the dog's eye into a webcam in order to see the child player. Follett went on to demonstrate how the paedophile would wear a t-shirt with a small illustration of a child's body on it in order to disguise themselves as another child, as well as how the paedophiles get children to press their faces against the screen, using special gloves to touch them.

Follett complained to the Broadcasting Standards Commission (BSC) and ITC about being duped into appearing into the programme. The BSC noted that the programme makers had deliberately given warning signals to suggest the material might be dubious and thus rejected Follett's complaints against the show as it successfully revealed the dangers of how public figures were willing to speak "with apparent authority about matters they do not understand".

== Expenses controversies ==
In May 2008 following the release of details of MPs expenses it emerged that the taxpayer had paid in excess of £1,600 for window cleaning of Follett's London flat in a single year. The invoices for the work were addressed to her husband.

In May of the following year, The Daily Telegraph alleged that she claimed more than £25,000 for private security patrols at her London home after she was mugged. Follett was also criticised for claiming £120,000 in expenses from the taxpayer over 6 years to pay for a London flat when she already owned one property in the capital. Additionally, commuting to London from her main home in Stevenage takes less than 30 minutes by rail. It was also revealed that Follett had claimed £528.75 to repair and clean a Chinese rug, though only £300 of the claim was actually accepted as the amount was deemed excessive.

In February 2010, following a review of all MP's expenses it was revealed that Follett had claimed more in dubious expenses than any other MP. Additional items she was ordered to repay included £4,454 for having six phone lines at her property and £2,812 for insuring her fine art collection. Follet also claimed twice for boiler insurance and for pest control at a property which was not her second home.

Follett had initially insisted all her claims were justified, but following significant criticism she changed her position and agreed to repay £32,976 for the security patrols and other claims. She later repaid £9,482, for a total of £42,458. Follett apologised, stating "I did try to act as honestly as possible but where I failed, I am sorry".

== Personal life ==
She is married to Ken Follett and since leaving Parliament she has become CEO of his company, which has offices in Stevenage. They own two properties in London, one in Knebworth, a property in Cape Town and a holiday home in Jumby Bay, Antigua. She has two daughters, Jann and Kim, a son, Adam, and two stepchildren, Emanuele and Marie-Claire.

Follett and her husband have been referred to as champagne socialists in the right wing media due to the alleged contrast between their political views and their extravagant lifestyle. She is also well known for training Labour Party members on how to handle the media and present themselves, which has been termed "Folletting". Follett is a frequent donor to the Labour Party.

In an interview, Ken Follett said that the character of "Pauline Green", president of the United States in his 2021 novel, Never, is based in part on his wife.

Parliament of the United Kingdom
Preceded by Timothy Wood	Member of Parliament for Stevenage; 1997–2010	Succeeded by Stephen McPartland
Political offices
Preceded by Margaret Hodge	Minister for Culture and Tourism; 2008–2009	Succeeded by Margaret Hodge
Preceded by Sarah McCarthy-Fry	Minister for Local Government; 2009–2010	Succeeded by Andrew Stunell
