= 1973 Durban strikes =

South African labour disputes

1973 Durban Strikes
- Date: 9 January 1973 – 31 March 1973
- Location: Durban, South Africa
- Caused by: Low wages and poor working conditions
- Methods: Protests, work stoppages
- Result: Establishment and growth of black trade unions in South Africa

Lead figures
Non-centralised leadership	

Number
60 000+ strikers	

The 1973 Durban strikes which were part of the wider Durban Moment, were a series of labour disputes and worker-led demonstrations held in Durban, South Africa in 1973. Black South African workers across various sectors deliberately withheld their labour in an attempt to demand higher wages and better working conditions. Beginning on 9 January 1973, mass strikes broke out in Durban and continued for three months until the end of March. The strikes involved roughly 60 000 Black workers and impacted more than 100 firms. The highest number of strikes occurred on the outskirts of Durban in textile, metal and chemical plants. Although the number of strikes declined after March, 100 000 Black and Indian South African workers were reported to have taken some form of industrial action by the end of 1973.

The 1973 Durban strikes were seen as a form of "mass civil disobedience" as it was illegal for black South Africans, under the Native Labour (Settlement of Disputes) Act, 1953 to strike in apartheid-era South Africa during this time. The 1973 Durban strikes were significant as they contributed to the formation of the Federation of South African Trade Unions in 1979 and then the Congress of South African Trade Unions (COSATU) in 1985 and the growth of South Africa's anti-apartheid trade union movement which played a central role in the struggle for the democratisation of society.

== Background ==
=== Wages and working conditions (early 1970s) ===
In 1970, approximately 80 percent of jobs within South Africa's private sector paid black African workers below the poverty datum line which was set at R18 per week in Durban. This, combined with rising inflationary pressures, made it difficult for black African workers to earn a subsistence income. The common consensus amongst state officials, employers and the National Development and Management Fund (NDMF) was that black African workers needed to increase productivity before they could be granted higher wages.

=== South Africa's industrial relations system (early 1970s) ===
Unlike Whites, Coloureds and Indians which were governed by the Industrial Conciliation Act, 1956, South Africa's industrial relations system did not legally recognise black African workers as 'employees' in the early 1970s. The 1953 Native Labour (Settlement of Disputes) Act prevented black African workers from joining registered trade unions (including mixed race unions). Without access to the same legal mechanisms given to Whites, Coloureds and Indians, black African workers had limited opportunities to engage in collective bargaining with their employers. Instead of trade unions, black African workers were restricted to plant-based works committees supervised by the Central Native Labour Board. Works committees were designed to pass on workplace grievances expressed by African workers to employers or Native Labour Officers. Marais Viljoen, the Minister of Labour, announced in parliament that the establishment and effectiveness of works committees would result in black African workers losing interest in trade unions. By January 1973, Durban reportedly had only two plant-based works committees. The Native Labour (Settlement of Disputes) Act also made it illegal for black African workers to strike. Consequences for doing so involved arrest, imprisonment and the risk of black African migrant workers being deported to the reserves.

Although the government had effectively suppressed unions in the South African Congress of Trade Unions by the end of the 1960s, labour sociologist Sakhela Buhlungu theorized that the 1973 Durban strikes were not spontaneous, but had an organizational backbone based on mutual aid societies as well as the shared networks and grievances of the African workers.

== Strikes (January–March 1973) ==
=== January ===
Coronation Tile and Brick, a brickworks company, was the first to be affected by the strikes. At 3am on 9 January 1973, black African migrant workers at the Number One plant were woken up by a group of colleagues and told to meet at a local sports field instead of going to work. Black African workers from the surrounding depots were informed by word-of-mouth and persuaded to join. 1500 black African workers marched to the sports field, carrying sticks and chanting: "Man is dead but his spirit still lives" in Zulu. The strikes, most of whom were earning R8.97 per week, demanded to be paid R20, just slightly above the poverty datum line which was set at R18 per week in Durban. Continuing for two days, it was reported that strikers reluctantly returned to work after Goodwill Zwelethini, the Zulu king, delivered a speech urging them to do so and promising to negotiate on their behalf. On 18 January, management responded by increasing pay to R11.50 per week.

Immediately thereafter, on 10 January, 70 black African workers at A.J. Keeler, a transport company, stopped working for 45 minutes and demanded a R2 wage increase. This was rejected by management on the grounds that workers were already receiving above the legal minimum wage.

Following this, on 11 January, T.W. Becket & Co was the next company to be affected by the strikes. 150 black African workers stopped working in demand for a R3 per week wage increase. The company refused and threatened to fire those who continued striking, enlisting the police and the Department of Labour for additional support. Despite management's threats, 100 workers refused to return to work and continued striking. It wasn't until management's offer to take back workers without any change in pay was rejected on 25 January that the company agreed to the R3 wage increase.

The strikes hit six companies within the first week of January. The main companies to be affected were those in the marine and transports sectors. By the end of January, the number of companies affected by the strikes totalled 29. Out of these, the Frame Group, which owned multiple textile factories across Durban, experienced the largest strikes. Beginning on Thursday, 25 January workers at the Frametex factory in New Germany (who were allegedly being paid between R5 and R9 per week) went on strike in demand for R20 per week. The following day, the strike spread to four other textile mills owned by the Frame Group. The strike continued for a couple of days and involved between 6000 and 7000 black African and Indian workers. Strikers returned to work after management agreed to increase pay by R1.75 and R3 per week. By the end of January, every textile factory belonging to the Frame Group in Natal had been affected by the strikes, bringing production to a complete standstill.

=== February ===
On 5 February, 3000 black African municipal workers, including street cleaners and refuse collectors, went on strike and demanded wage increases of up to R10 per week, bringing Durban's essential services to a halt. The next day, the number of strikers increased to 13 000. Management responded by offering to increase pay from R13 to R15 per week. This was rejected by workers. The strike grew as black African workers from other factories and areas of Natal, such as Pietermaritzburg and Port Shepstone, joined municipal workers. 30 000 people allegedly took part in the strike. Black African municipal workers returned to work on 8 February.

=== March ===
Although sporadic strikes by black African workers occurred during March, the strike wave reportedly died down after the end of February. The initial strikes of 1973 were fairly small. Despite this, they had a ripple effect and were described by the Institute of Education (IIE) as a "series of spontaneous actions by workers, which spread by imitation." Most of the strikes were of short duration, with less than half of them continuing for more than two days. By the end of March, approximately 60 000 black African workers had taken part in the strikes, affecting more than 146 firms.

== Responses and reactions ==
=== Response from employers ===
There were mixed responses from employers. Some companies sought immediate settlement in order to appease strikers, whilst others resisted. Some employers increased wage levels before workers took action in order to prevent similar outbreaks. Companies affected by the strikes were told to contact the Department of Labour and the police (in the case of violence) by the Durban Chamber of Commerce. Employers were advised by the Department of Labour not to bargain with strikers, to avoid responding to requests until they returned to work, and to deny compensation for time not spent at work. Most of the strike-affected companies responded by increasing wages. Although many companies threatened to fire workers, this was seldom the case. A lack of communication between workers and employers was viewed as one of the main causes of the strikes amongst employers.

=== Response from police ===
The police were present throughout the duration of the strikes. However, they rarely intervened and were reportedly told to use only minimum force when required. For the most part, strikers were described as "generally good-natured" and non-violent. Despite it being illegal for black Africans to strike under the 1973 Native Labour (Settlement of Disputes) Act, only 353 arrests were made by the end of 1973. It is noted amongst scholars that if police had intervened, matters would have escalated and become dangerous. Employers and members of parliament insisted that "agitators" were responsible for causing the strikes. Marais Viljoen, the Minister of Labour, blamed the National Union of South African Students (NUSAS), the Black Workers' Project (BWP) and the Trade Union Council of South Africa for the labour disputes and made reference to how agitators were planning on taking down the State. Despite this, police claimed there to be "no evidence of an organisation behind the strikes."

=== Public and media response ===
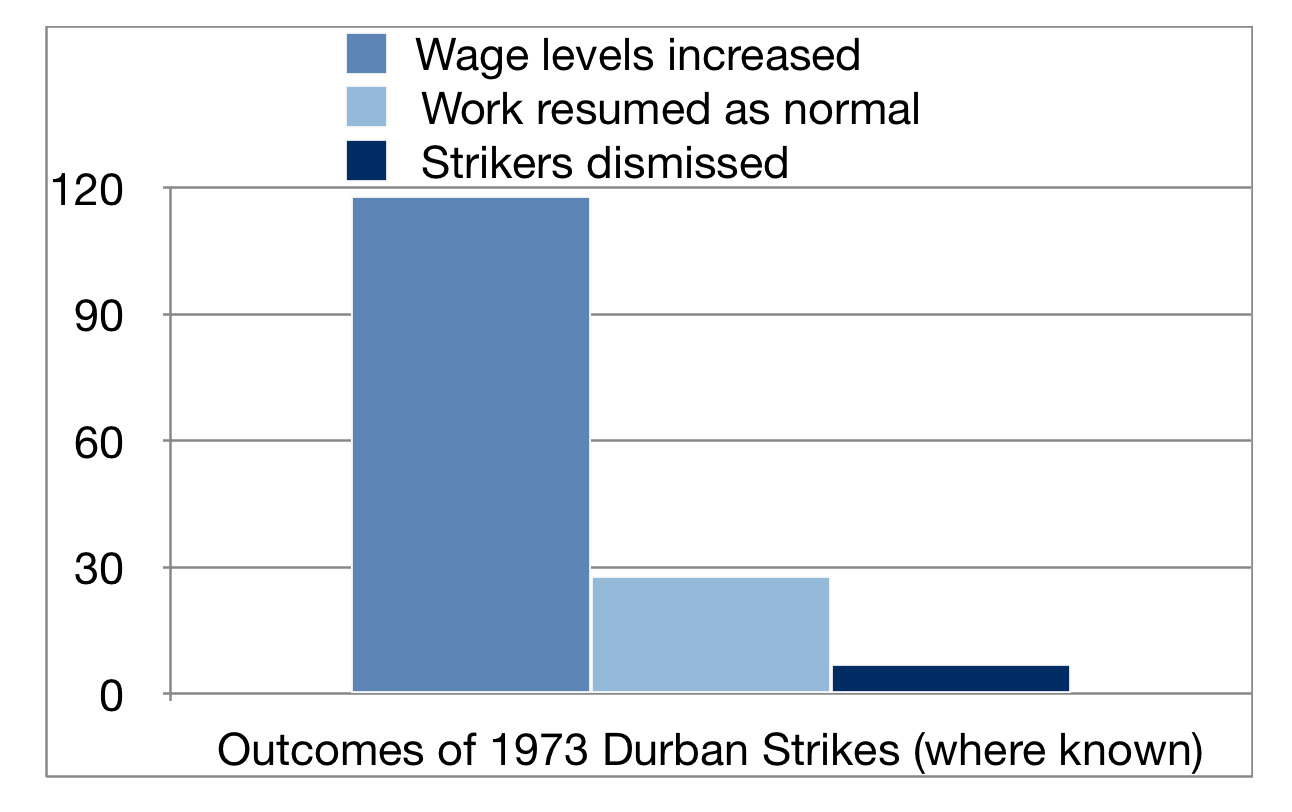
Outcomes of the 1973 Durban Strikes

The 1973 Durban strikes sparked widespread media attention. A number of local and state media reports, including those released by Rapport and SABC, were sympathetic towards black African workers and held employers responsible for low wage levels. On 30 January 1973, the Johannesburg Star published an article which stated, "If labour peace is to be restored...employers will have to take the initiative and raise pay at least to a survival level, and R5 a week is not that." Philip Frame, the owner of the Frame Group, received considerable media backlash during the time of the strikes, as did the Minister of Labour who was criticised by the press for blaming agitators for the cause of the strikes.

== Legacy and aftermath ==
=== Immediate aftermath ===
In 1973, Minister of Labour, Marais Viljoen, amended the Native Labour (Settlement of Disputes) Act, 1953 to the Bantu Labour (Settlement of Disputes) Act. The changes made it legal for black African workers to strike for the first time in three decades. Recognition of black trade unions, on the other hand, remained "out of the question."

After the strikes, many companies and state officials pushed for the expansion of plant-based 'works committees' and 'liaison committees' to enhance communication between employers and workers and improve shop-floor governance. With liaison committees, half of the members could be elected by employers. These alleged improvements were largely frowned upon by black African workers and labour activists as they were seen as an attempt to restrict the unionisation of black African workers and to maintain employer control.

=== Union activity ===
The strike wave of 1973 resulted in a dramatic resurgence of union activity in South Africa as black African workers joined newly established, unauthorised unions. Five black unions, with approximately 11 000 members, were reported in 1975. These unions operated with plant-based works committees and successfully managed to get shop-stewards onto liaison committees which, in turn, made it harder for employers to ignore the interests of black African workers.

On 1 May 1979, amendments were made to the Labour Relations Act, otherwise known as the Wiehahn Commission. The Wiehahn Commission made it possible for black trade unions to receive limited State recognition. The 1973 Durban strikes are widely cited by academics as a turning point in South Africa's industrial relations system as it gave rise to the black trade union movement and was a major step forward in the struggle to build a mass democratic opposition to apartheid which played a central role in the struggle for the democratisation of society.
