= Blackheath (Lewisham ward) =

Electoral ward in London, England

- Electoral ward for the Lewisham London Borough Council
- Blackheath ward boundaries since 2022
- Borough: Lewisham
- County: Greater London
- Population: 16,429 (2021) (Note: 2021 Census data reported for 2022 ward boundaries)
- Electorate: 11,259 (2022)
- Area: 2.459 square kilometres (0.949 sq mi)

Current electoral ward
- Created: 1978
- GSS code: E05013715 (2022–present)

Blackheath is an electoral ward in the London Borough of Lewisham. It returns councillors to Lewisham London Borough Council.

== Lewisham council elections since 2022 ==
There was a revision of ward boundaries in Lewisham in 2022.

=== 2024 by-election ===
The by-election on 4 July 2024 took place on the same day as the United Kingdom general election. It followed the resignation of Juliet Campbell.

2024 Blackheath by-election
Party	Candidate	Votes	%	±%
Labour	Pauline Dall	2,959	43.8	−4.5
Green	Matt Barker	1,472	21.8	+5.0
Liberal Democrats	Chris Maines	1,360	20.1	−12.1
Conservative	Hugh Rees-Beaumont	970	14.3	
Turnout		6,761		
Labour hold		Swing		

=== 2022 election ===
The election took place on 5 May 2022.

2022 Lewisham London Borough Council election: Blackheath (3)
Party	Candidate	Votes	%	±%
Labour	Juliet Campbell	2,035	48.3	
Labour	Amanda de Ryk	1,884	44.7	
Labour	Luke Warner	1,565	37.2	
Liberal Democrats	Chris Maines	1,356	32.2	
Liberal Democrats	Benedict Maguire	1,211	28.7	
Liberal Democrats	Helen Steel	1,202	28.5	
Green	Matt Barker	708	16.8	
Green	Anne Caron-Delion	696	16.5	
Conservative	Caroline Attfield	627	14.9	
Green	John Wood	467	11.1	
Conservative	Nicola Peers	451	10.7	
Conservative	Ian Bentinck	435	10.3	
Turnout			38.7	
Labour win (new boundaries)				
Labour win (new boundaries)				
Labour win (new boundaries)				

== 2002–2022 Lewisham council elections ==
Blackheath ward boundaries from 2002 to 2022

There was a revision in ward boundaries in Lewisham in 2002.

=== 2018 election ===
The election took place on 3 May 2018.

2018 Lewisham London Borough Council election: Blackheath (3)
Party	Candidate	Votes	%	±%
Labour	Juliet Campbell	2,069	46.8	
Labour	Kevin Bonavia	1,978	44.8	
Labour	Amanda De Ryk	1,855	42.0	
Liberal Democrats	Chris Maines	1,117	25.3	
Liberal Democrats	Nadya Phoenix	889	20.1	
Conservative	Nicola Peers	884	20.0	
Conservative	Simon Nundy	882	20.0	
Conservative	Jonathan Lee	881	19.9	
Green	Abigail Phillips	862	19.5	
Liberal Democrats	Anthony Crowther	810	18.3	
Majority				
Turnout			44	
Labour hold		Swing		
Labour hold		Swing		
Labour hold		Swing		

=== 2014 election ===
The election took place on 22 May 2014.

=== 2010 election ===
The election on 6 May 2010 took place on the same day as the United Kingdom general election.

=== 2006 election ===
The election took place on 4 May 2006.

=== 2002 election ===
The election took place on 2 May 2002.
