= Timothy Wood =

British politician (born 1940)

Comptroller of the Household
- In office 12 December 1995 – 2 May 1997
- Prime Minister: John Major
- Preceded by: David Lightbown
- Succeeded by: Thomas McAvoy

Lord Commissioner of the Treasury
- In office 14 April 1992 – 5 July 1995
- Prime Minister: John Major
- Preceded by: Tom Sackville
- Succeeded by: Bowen Wells

Member of Parliament for Stevenage
- In office 9 June 1983 – 8 April 1997
- Preceded by: New Constituency
- Succeeded by: Barbara Follett

Leader of Bracknell District Council
- In office May 1976 – 5 May 1978
- Preceded by: Bill Lindop
- Succeeded by: Donald Brydon

Personal details
- Born: Timothy John Rogerson Wood; 13 August 1940 (age 86)
- Party: Conservative

Timothy John Rogerson Wood (born 13 August 1940), known as Tim Wood, is a British politician. He was the Conservative Party member of parliament (MP) for Stevenage, which he won at the 1983 general election.

Before becoming an MP, he served as a councillor on Bracknell District Council for Harmanswater from 1976 to 1983. Immediately after his election, he was appointed Leader of the Council, serving until May 1978. While in Parliament, Wood served as a Parliamentary Private Secretary to Ministers in the Ministry of Defence and Northern Ireland Office. Following the 1992 general election, Wood became a Government Whip.

At the 1997 general election a swing of 13.9% from the Conservatives to Labour saw Wood defeated by Labour Party candidate Barbara Follett by 11,582 votes.

On 3 May 2007, Wood was elected to East Devon District Council to represent Exmouth Littleham ward.

Political offices
Preceded by David Lightbown	Comptroller of the Household; 1995–1997	Succeeded by Tommy McAvoy
Parliament of the United Kingdom
New constituency	Stevenage; 1983 – 1997	Succeeded by Barbara Follett
