= Zita Gurmai =

Hungarian politician (born 1965)

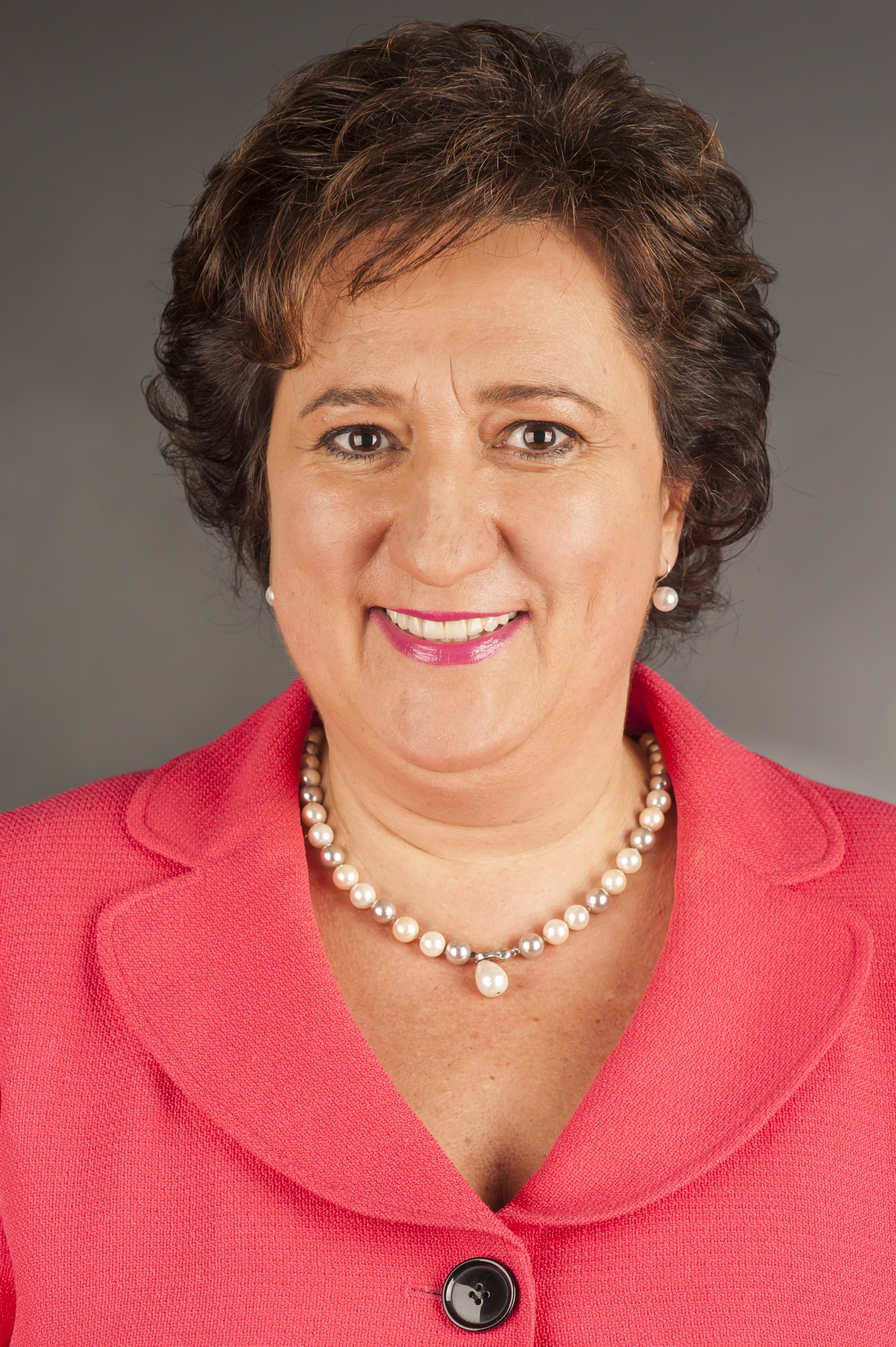
Gurmai in 2014

Zita Gurmai (born 1 June 1965 in Budapest) is a Hungarian politician who served as a Member of the European Parliament from 2004 until 2014. She is a member of the Hungarian Socialist Party. Gurmai currently serves as President of PES Women, the women's wing of the Party of European Socialists.

== Education and early career ==
- 1983–1988. Karl Marx University of Economics (1983–1988); doctorate 1991
- 1988–1990. Comporgan company, communications coordinator
- 1990–1992. Westel Rádiótelefon Kft., sales executive
- 1994–1995. Political History Institute, PR manager
- 1995–2002. Szelén Művelődési Tanácsadó Kft., manager

== Political career ==
From the 1990s Gurmai was active in civil society, sets up many foundations: Nők a valódi esélyegenlőségért Alapítvány (Women's Foundation for Genuine Equality), Nők a közéletben Alapítvány (Women in Public Life Foundation). She drew up many reports on equality and done research as organiser and co-author.

- 2002–2004. Member of the Hungarian Parliament, delegate to the NATO Parliamentary Assembly, delegate to the Central European Network, Observer in the European Parliament
- From 1993. Hungarian Socialist Party party member, in 1995. administrator, women's section
- From 1999. Vice-president, Socialist International Women
- From 2001. President, women's section
- From 2004. President, PES Women

=== Member of the European Parliament, 2004–2014 ===
During her time in the European Parliament, Gurmai served on the Committee on Constitutional Affairs (2009–2014), the Committee on Women's Rights and Gender Equality (2004–2014) and the Committee on Regional Development (2004–2009). In this capacity, she was the parliament’s co-rapporteur (alongside Alain Lamassoure) on the rules governing the European Citizens' Initiative in 2010.

When Martine Aubry took over as leader of France’s Socialist Party in 2008, Gurmai became the party’s national spokesperson for women’s rights.

=== Special Adviser to the European Commission, 2015–2018 ===
From 2015 until 2018, Gurmai served as Special Adviser on Gender Policy in Development Cooperation to European Commissioner for International Cooperation and Development Neven Mimica.

=== Member of the Hungarian Parliament, 2018–present ===
Since the 2018 elections, Gurmai has been a member of the Hungarian Parliament again.

In addition to her role in parliament, Gurmai has been serving as a member of the Hungarian delegation to the Parliamentary Assembly of the Council of Europe since 2018. In the Assembly, she has since been a member of the Committee on Equality and Non-Discrimination and the Committee on the Honouring of Obligations and Commitments by Member States of the Council of Europe. She has also been serving as the Assembly's General Rapporteur on violence against women since 2020.

== Political positions ==
When the International Investment Bank announced its move to Hungary in 2019, Gurmai publicly called the bank “Putin’s Trojan horse.”

== Personal life ==
Gurmai was married to Mihály Gulyás. Now divorced, they have two sons, Mihály Balázs and Bálint Imre.
