= Kevin Bonavia =

British politician (born 1977)

Kevin Bonavia MP
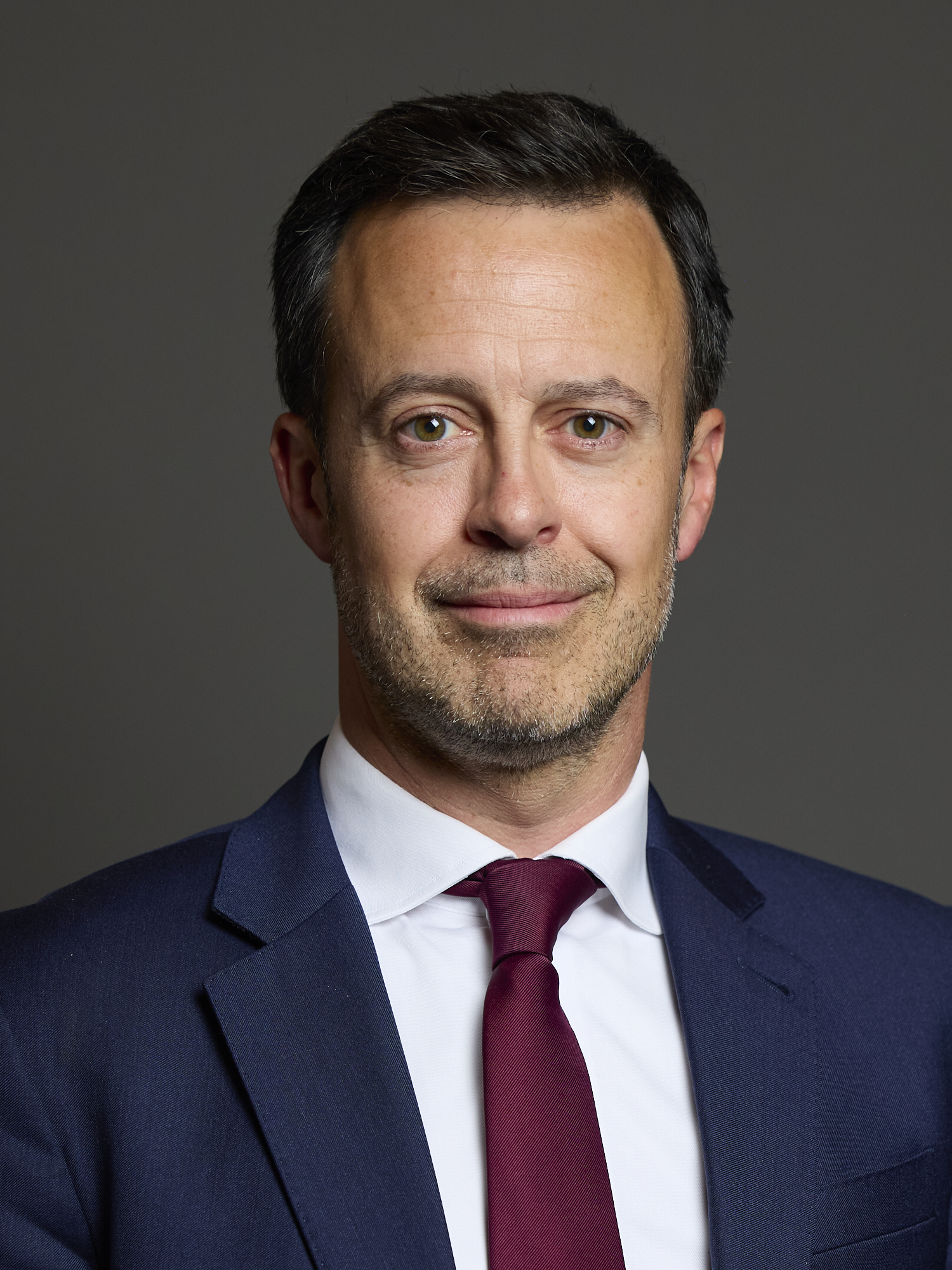
- Official portrait, 2024

Member of Parliament for Stevenage
- Incumbent
- Assumed office 4 July 2024
- Preceded by: Stephen McPartland
- Majority: 6,618 (15.5%)

Member of Lewisham London Borough Council for Blackheath
- In office 6 May 2010 – 5 May 2022

Personal details
- Born: August 1977 (age 49) Rabat, Malta
- Party: Labour
- Education: Eltham College
- Alma mater: University of Birmingham (BA)
- Website: www.kevinbonaviamp.com

Kevin Bonavia (born August 1977) is a British Labour Party politician serving as a Member of Parliament for Stevenage since 2024. He has worked as a lawyer and served as a member of the Lewisham London Borough Council from 2010 to 2022.

== Early life ==
Bonavia was born to a Maltese father and a Scottish mother. Born in Rabat, Malta, he moved to England at age eight. He attended the private Eltham College on a bursary and graduated from the University of Birmingham with a Bachelor of Arts (BA) in History, then completed a postgraduate diploma at the University of Law.

Before entering politics, he worked as a litigator and at Steel & Shamash solicitors, where he acted for the Labour Party, MPs and councillors on a range of matters, including advising candidates on electoral law issues during the 2005 General Election campaign. He was a youth officer in Birmingham Edgbaston, Greenwich & Woolwich and Lewisham East Constituency Labour Parties. In 2004-05, Bonavia was Chair of the Young Fabians, a socialist society affiliated with the Labour Party.

== Political career ==
=== Councillor ===
Bonavia became a councillor for the Blackheath ward in Lewisham London Borough Council in 2010 and was re-elected in 2014 and 2018, stepping down in 2022. In 2014, he became Cabinet Member for Resources and from 2018 to 2022, was Cabinet Member for Democracy, Refugees and Accountability.

On 30 June 2016, Bonavia was one of 600 Labour councillors who signed a public statement calling on Jeremy Corbyn to resign as leader and “make way for the new leadership”. On 19 August 2016, Bonavia was one of 1,000 Labour councillors who signed a letter announcing and explaining why they were backing Owen Smith over Jeremy Corbyn in the 2016 Labour leadership election.

=== Member of Parliament ===
In 2010, Bonavia ran as the Labour candidate for the Rochford & Southend East, Essex constituency, where he came second with 20.3% of the vote, a drop of 11.3%. In the 2019, Bonavia ran as the Labour candidate for the Clacton, Essex constituency, winning 15.5% of the vote, a drop of 9.9%. In 2024, he ran successfully in the Stevenage, Hertfordshire constituency, winning 41.4% of the vote, an increase of 6.2%.

In November 2024, Bonavia voted in favour of the Terminally Ill Adults (End of Life) Bill, which proposes to legalise assisted suicide.

Parliament of the United Kingdom
Preceded by Stephen McPartland	Member of Parliament for Stevenage; 2024–present	Incumbent
