= Rick Turner (philosopher) =

South African academic and anti-apartheid activist

- Born: Richard Turner; 25 September 1941; Stellenbosch, Union of South Africa
- Died: 8 January 1978 (aged 36); Durban, South Africa
- Cause of death: Assassination
- Education: St George's Grammar School
- Alma mater: University of Cape Town; Sorbonne
- Occupations: Academic and anti-apartheid activist
- Employer: University of Natal
- Spouses: Barbara Hubbard (m. 1963; div. 1970) Foszia Fisher
- Children: Jann Turner and Kim Turner

Richard Turner (25 September 1941, in Stellenbosch – 8 January 1978, in Durban), known as Rick Turner, was a South African academic and anti-apartheid activist who was murdered, possibly by the South African security forces, in 1978. Nelson Mandela described Turner "as a source of inspiration".

== Life ==
Turner matriculated from St George's Grammar School, Cape Town in 1959 and graduated from the University of Cape Town in 1963, attaining a B.A. Honours. He continued his studies at the Sorbonne in Paris where he studied philosophy under Henri Lefebvre and received a doctorate for a dissertation on the French intellectual, Jean-Paul Sartre.

He returned to South Africa in 1966 and worked on his mother's farm in Stellenbosch for two years before lecturing at the universities of Cape Town, Stellenbosch and Rhodes. He moved to Natal in 1970 and became a senior lecturer in political science at the University of Natal and in that same year he met Steve Biko and the two formed a close relationship and became the leading figures in The Durban Moment.

Turner became a prominent academic at the university and assumed a leading role in radical philosophy in South Africa and published a number of papers. His work was written from a radical existential perspective and stressed the virtues of bottom-up popular democracy against authoritarian Stalinist and Trotskyist strands of leftism. He was a strong advocate of workers' control and a critic of the reduction of politics to party politics.

== Works ==
In 1972 Turner wrote a book called The Eye of the Needle - Towards Participatory Democracy in South Africa. The South African authorities thought that the book exercised a strong influence on opposition thinking with its plea for a radically democratic and non-racial South Africa. Such a society, he argued, would liberate whites as well as blacks.

In 1973 he published a widely influential article titled "Dialectical Reason", in the British journal Radical Philosophy. In the same year, he was banned by the South African authorities for five years. He was not allowed to visit his two daughters or his mother and had to stay in the Durban area. Even though he was banned this did not stop him from speaking out and in April 1973 Turner and other banned individuals staged an Easter fast to illustrate the sufferings that bannings impose on people. The fast was supported by the Pope and the Archbishop of Canterbury. After his banning Turner was kept on the staff at the University of Natal even though he was not allowed to lecture.

== Political activism ==
He attended the South African Student Organisation (SASO) terrorism trial of nine Black Consciousness movement leaders as a defence witness in March 1976 where he expounded on theories expressed in The Eye of the Needle. In November 1976 Dr Turner received a Humboldt Fellowship, one of the world's leading academic awards from Heidelberg University, but after months of negotiating with the Minister of Justice, he was refused permission to travel to Germany. Turner was also involved with the re-emerging black trade union movement of the 1970s.

== Assassination ==
On 8 January 1978, Turner was shot through a window of his home in Dalton Avenue, Bellaire (a suburb of Durban), and died in the arms of his 13-year-old daughter, Jann. After months of police investigations, no significant clues were found and his killers were never identified. However, it is widely believed that he was murdered by the security services. He is buried in the Old Durban Brook Street Cemetery.

== Legacy ==
He is recognised as one of the most significant academic philosophers to have come out of South Africa. His work is still read in popular radical movements and South African academics like Anthony Fluxman, Mabogo Percy More, Andrew Nash and Peter Vale have continued to make use of his work.

== Family ==
Turner had two children, daughters Jann Turner and Kim Turner, and was married twice: first to Barbara Follett (née Hubbard) and then to Foszia Turner (née Fisher). Turner's eldest daughter Jann Turner is a director, novelist, television director and screenwriter. Barbara Follett later became a British Labour Party Member of Parliament.

== Writing by Rick Turner ==
- What is Political Philosophy?, Radical, 1968
- The Eye of the Needle, 1972]
- Dialectical Reason, Radical Philosophy, No.4., 1973
- The Relevance of Contemporary Radical Thought, SPRO-CAS, 1971

== Articles or Books on Turner ==
- Choosing to be Free: the life story of Rick Turner, by Billy Keniston, 2013. Auckland Park: Jacana
- Rick Turner, SA History Online
- Philosophy & the Crisis in South Africa, M.A. Nupen, 1988
- Richard Turner and the Politics of Emancipation, Duncan Greeves, 1987
- Biographical introduction in 'The eye of the needle' by Tony Morphet, 1980
- Brushing Against the Grain: Oppositional Discourse in South Africa by Tony Morphet, 1990
- The Moment of Western Marxism by Andrew Nash, 1999
- Re-Reading Rick Turner in the New South Africa, by Tony Fluxman and Peter Vale, 2004
- Black Consciousness in Dialogue: Steve Biko, Richard Turner and the ‘Durban Moment’ in South Africa, 1970 – 1974, Ian McQueen, SOAS, 2009
- Hippies, radicals and the Sounds of Silence - Cultural Dialectics at two South African Universities 1966-1976, Helen Lunn, PhD Thesis, UKZN, 2010
- Lambert, Rob (2010). "Eddie Webster, the Durban moment and new labour internationalism".
- Re-imagining South Africa: Black Consciousness, radical Christianity and the New Left, 1967 – 1977, Ian McQueen, PhD Thesis, University of Sussex, 2011
- My personal reflections about writing The Eye of the Needle , Foszia Turner-Stylianou, Daily Maverick, 2022

== See also ==
- The Durban Moment
- List of people subject to banning orders under apartheid
- List of unsolved murders (1900–1979)
