= Giacomo Filibeck =

Italian politician (born 1978)

Secretary General of the Party of European Socialists
- Incumbent
- Assumed office 11 November 2023
- Preceded by: Achim Post

Personal details
- Born: 1978 (age 47–48)
- Party: Democratic Party

Giacomo Filibeck (born 1978) is an Italian politician serving as secretary general of the Party of European Socialists since 2023. From 2005 to 2009, he served as president of the Young European Socialists. From 2002 to 2004, he served as president of the European Youth Forum.
