= PES Women =

Women's wing of the Party of European Socialists

- President: Zita Gurmai
- Vice President: Elke Ferner; Sonja Kovac; Rosario Gamboa; Emmi Lintonen
- Founded: 1992
- Headquarters: Rue Guimard 10; 1040 Brussels; Belgium
- Ideology: Social democracy
- Mother party: Party of European Socialists
- International affiliation: Progressive Alliance
- Website: women.pes.eu

PES Women is the women's wing of the Party of European Socialists (PES). The organisation campaigns for Women's rights and gender equality across Europe.

== History ==
The organisation was formed in 1992 when the Party of European Socialists was officially formed as a European party. Before becoming an integral part of the new organisation, it was known as the PES Women Standing Committee. In 2014, PES Women celebrated 20 years.

The purpose of PES Women as described by previous organisation presidents is to ensure that women have a voice and have an increased contribution to politics. It is to ensure that women are part of the decision-making process in European politics. The organisation has women association members both within and outside the European Union including: the United Kingdom - Labour Women's Network. Norway and Switzerland.

== Organisation ==
The leadership is made up of PES member parties from across Europe.

| Position | Name |
|---|---|
| President | (Hungary) Zita Gurmai |
| Vice-President | (Germany) Elke Ferner |
| Vice-President | (Croatia) Sonja Kovac |
| Vice-President | (Portugal) Rosario Gamboa |
| Vice-President | (Finland) Emmi Lintonen |
