= Durban Moment =

Period in the early 1970s in South Africa

The Durban Moment refers to the period in the early and mid-1970s when the South African city of Durban became the centre of a new vibrancy in the struggle against apartheid. Coined by academic Tony Morphet, the term describes the convergence of various intellectual and activist movements in Durban that significantly influenced the anti-apartheid struggle. The two central figures in this moment were Steve Biko and Richard Turner – the former was closely associated with the Black Consciousness Movement and the latter with the trade union movement. The two were in a reading group together. Both were influenced by the new left and had links to radical Christian circles.

== Background and History ==
Tony Morphet coined the term the "Durban moment" in his Rick Turner Memorial lecture to the University of Natal in Durban on 27 September 1990. He described four simultaneous intellectual projects occurring between 1970 and 1974, citing Rick Turner's radical political philosophical teachings and organizing; the activism of then student and intellectual Steve Biko; the challenge to revisionist Afrikaner history by sociologist Dunbar Moodie; and the critiques of English literature by Mike Kirkwood.

1973 Strikes

Along with the formation of the Black Consciousness movement by students at the University of Natal the other key event of "moment" was the 1973 worker strikes in Durban, the first worker unrest in South Africa in over a decade since the Sharpeville massacre in 1960. Approximately 100,000 workers went on strike in Durban in 1973. These protests bloomed into a trade union movement, and with the help of the Black Consciousness Movement, refocused the anti-apartheid struggle from exiles to within the domestic borders of South Africa.

Activist Organizing

The Durban Moment signaled a departure from earlier banned anti-apartheid movements in its non-racial, non-hierarchical, and explicitly socialist intellectual strains. Mahmood Mamdani stated that "radical white students joined non-white migrant workers in a mobilisation that gave birth to South Africa’s non-racial unions; and African, Indian, and Coloured students, inspired by the Black Consciousness Movement, were reborn as black". University of Natal at Durban Students played a large role in the Durban moment, forming the Student Wages Commission (SWC) in 1971 to advocate for better labor conditions and wages for workers. They advocated to the government Wages Board on the behalf of black workers who were prohibited from unionizing and encouraged black workers to attend the Board meetings by the hundreds. The General Factory Workers' Benefit Fund grew from this work, becoming a support fund, organizing environment, and precedent to unions. The combined efforts of Durban's young worker and student population created a revival of activist mobilization in the 1970s.

Aftermath

Turner and Biko were sent to house arrest and to a homeland respectively in 1973. In 1974 strikes continued to amass to the government's alarm, leading the state to ban four of the white intellectuals in the movement (David Hemson, Halton Cheadle, David Davis, and Jeannette Cunningham-Brown). The union membership continued to grow until 1975, when it declined due to halting progress to achieve workers' rights and the targeting of twenty-two union leaders by the state in November 1976. Biko and Turner were murdered in 1977 and 1978 respectively.

== Legacy ==
The Durban Moment is a significant period in the history of the anti-apartheid struggle within South Africa. It represented not only a geographic shift, highlighting activists in Natal and Durban, specifically, but also a shift in tactics and attitudes. Influenced by socialism, radical Christianity, and various new left ideologies, intellectual leaders forged a new opposition to the apartheid regime. By linking Black Consciousness to labor activism, the Durban Moment forged a new and powerful coalition. The Durban Moment is also cited as a precursor to the creation of the Federation of South African Trade Unions and the Congress of South African Trade Unions in 1979 and 1985, respectively. The organization of students, laborers, and ordinary citizens across racial lines presented a significant threat to the apartheid regime's norms and laws, while simultaneously influencing subsequent trade union tactics and the eventual triumph of the broader anti-apartheid movement.

== See also ==
- 1973 Durban strikes
