= Juliet Campbell (politician) =

British politician

Juliet Campbell MP
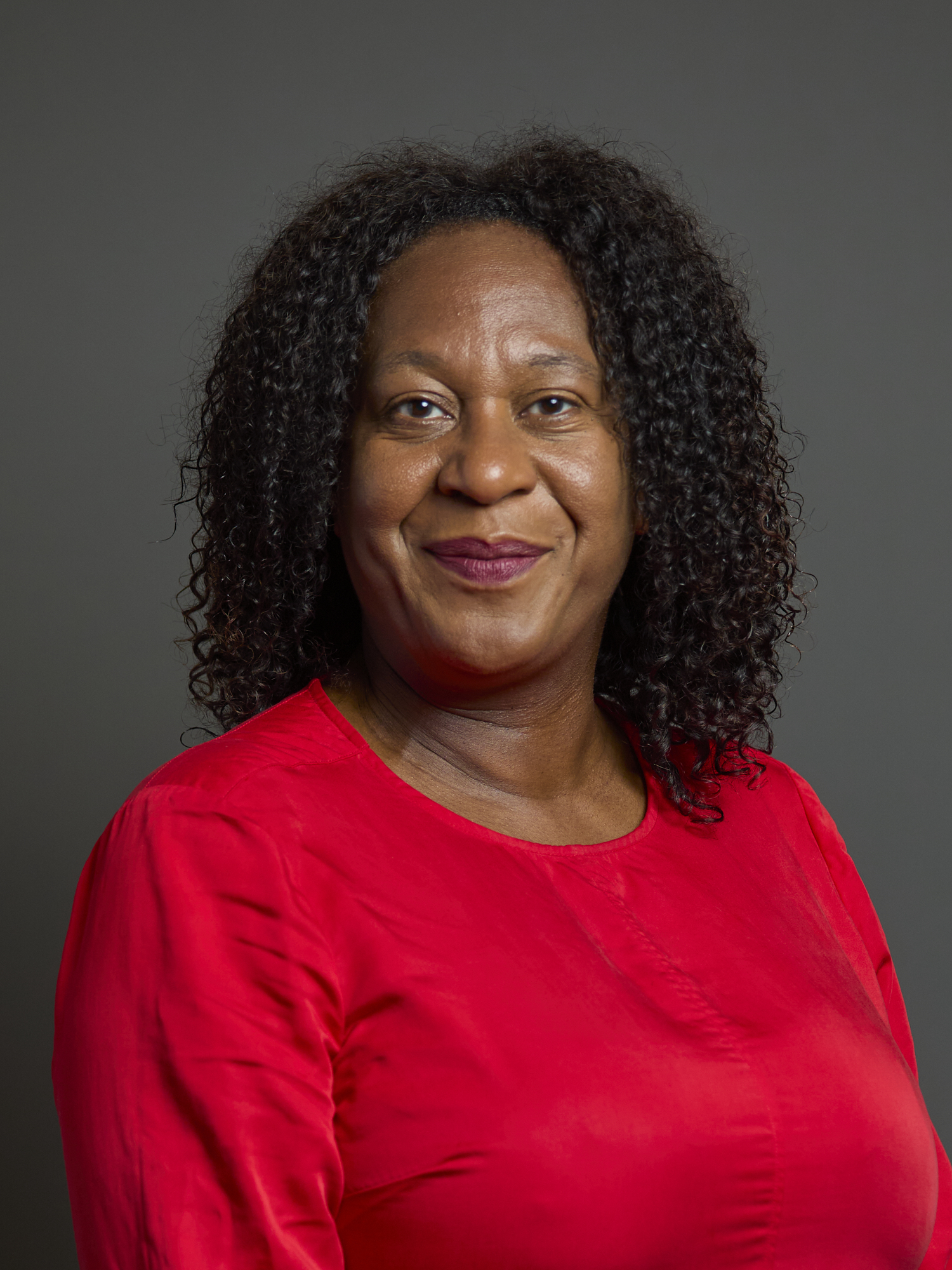
- Official portrait, 2024

Member of Parliament for Broxtowe
- Incumbent
- Assumed office 4 July 2024
- Preceded by: Darren Henry
- Majority: 8,403 (17.6%)

Member of Lewisham London Borough Council for Blackheath
- In office 3 May 2018 – 30 May 2024

Personal details
- Born: Juliet Olive Campbell Bilborough, Nottingham
- Party: Labour

Juliet Olive Campbell is a British Labour Party politician serving as the Member of Parliament (MP) for Broxtowe since the 2024 general election. She was previously the Cabinet Member for Safer Lewisham, Refugees and Equalities on Lewisham Council.

== Early life ==
Campbell was born in Bilborough, Nottingham, to Jamaican parents. Her father is an engineer who received training from the Army Reserve in the 1970s. Her father worked at Boots, working on the discovery and manufacture of Ibuprofen. Her mother first worked for the NHS, before running a shop in Radford.

== Career ==
Campbell started her career as an entry-level civil servant, before eventually working her way up to a senior manager in the NHS. Juliet also founded a Community Interest Company, to help support dyslexia education.

== Political career ==
In May 2018 Campbell was elected as a councillor on Lewisham council in London, representing Blackheath ward. In 2022 she was appointed as a cabinet member for Communities, Refugees and Wellbeing. During her tenure as councillor she helped with the transformation of a historic telephone box into a mini library for the community. She resigned as councillor on the day the election was called.

In the United Kingdom 2024 General Election Campbell was elected as the MP for Broxtowe, beating the incumbent Conservative MP, Darren Henry. Campbell won with 40.9% of the vote, with a majority of 8,403.

Since being elected to parliament, she has served as part of the delegation members to the NATO Parliamentary Assembly.

=== Assisted Dying ===
Campbell opposed Kim Leadbeater's bill introducing assisted dying into law. Campbell served on the committee examining this legislation, and proposed 18 amendments to the bill which she described would "make it [the bill] safer". These amendments attempted to tighten safeguarding criteria, define informed consent more stringently and prevent coercion in making a decision to end ones life. Campbell also proposed an amendment preventing a doctor from raising the idea of assisted dying until the patient had suggested it first. Only two of Campbell's amendments were accepted.

After the Committee had concluded its scrutiny of the bill, Campbell described the "sheer volume of emotion" on both sides of the debate, and shared she had received hundreds of emails from constituents regarding the proposal. Campbell was one of nine of the committee members who voted against the bill, with the other fourteen voting in favour.

=== Dyslexia ===
Juliet has described education of neurodiverse young people as what drew her into politics and "wanting to help other families struggling against the system" after her son was only diagnosed with dyslexia aged fourteen.

Juliet chairs the All Party Parliamentary Group on Dyslexia. Shortly after being elected to Parliament, Campbell featured in a documentary on dyslexia filmed by celebrity chef Jamie Oliver.

Campbell advocates for "reform of the teacher training curriculum, to help deliver inclusive teaching styles that meet the needs of all pupils in the classroom" and has called on the Government to introduce a National Dyslexia Strategy.

Parliament of the United Kingdom
Preceded by Darren Henry	Member of Parliament for Broxtowe; 2024–present	Incumbent
