= Jann Turner =

South African film director

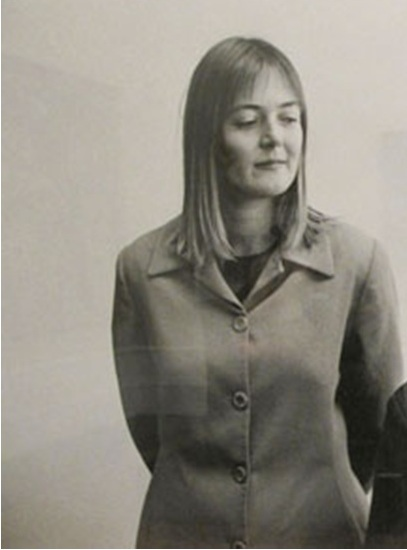
- Turner in 1997
- Born: 1964 (age 61–62)
- Occupations: Film director, novelist, screenwriter, television director
- Years active: 1990s–present
- Parent(s): Rick Turner (father); Barbara Hubbard (mother)
- Relatives: Ken Follett (step-father)

Jann Turner (born 1964) is a South African film director, novelist, television director and screenwriter. Her feature film directorial debut was the 2009 film White Wedding.

== Life and career ==
Turner was born to anti-Apartheid academic Rick Turner and later politician Barbara Hubbard. Her father was killed in front of her when she was thirteen years old; her parents were divorced at that time. Turner along with her younger sister, Kim, spent most of their childhood living in Cape Town, with their mother. Three months after her father's murder, the family fled to Britain due to threats of being banned. Turner completed her education in Britain and the United States, graduating from Oxford University and Tisch School of the Arts.

Prior to film directing, Turner worked as an editor for television specials at National Geographic Society, and directed and produced episodic television shows in South Africa. Turner then moved to Los Angeles, where she now lives with her two children, and directed episodes of The Big C, Emily Owens, M.D., The Carrie Diaries and 9-1-1.

Turner is also a novelist and has authored the novels Heartland, Southern Cross and Home Is Where You Find It. She has also written for the teen drama Teen Wolf.
