= Party of European Socialists =

Centre-left European political party

Party of European Socialists Official names: see below
- Abbreviation: PES
- President: Stefan Löfven (SE)
- Secretary-General: Giacomo Filibeck (IT)
- Founded: 9 November 1992; 34 years ago
- Preceded by: Confederation of the Socialist Parties of the European Community (1973)
- Headquarters: Rue Guimard 10, 1040 Brussels, Belgium
- Think tank: Foundation for European Progressive Studies
- Youth wing: Young European Socialists
- Women's wing: PES Women
- LGBT wing: Rainbow Rose
- Membership (22 December 2025): 6
- Ideology: Social democracy Pro-Europeanism
- Political position: Centre-left
- European Parliament group: Progressive Alliance of Socialists and Democrats
- International affiliation: Progressive Alliance; Socialist International
- Colours: Red
- European Parliament: 134 / 720
- European Commission: 4 / 27
- European Council: 3 / 27
- EU lower/unicameral houses: 996 / 6,217
- EU upper houses: 297 / 1,459

Website
- pes.eu

The Party of European Socialists (PES) is a social democratic European political party.

The PES comprises national-level political parties from all the European economic area states (EEA) plus the United Kingdom. This includes major parties such as the Social Democratic Party of Germany, the French Socialist Party, the British Labour Party, the Italian Democratic Party, the Portuguese Socialist Party, the Romanian Social Democrat Party and the Spanish Socialist Workers' Party. Parties from a number of other European countries and from the Mediterranean region are also admitted to the PES as associate or observer parties. Most member, associate, and observer parties are members of the wider Progressive Alliance or Socialist International.

The PES is currently led by its president, Stefan Löfven, a former Prime Minister of Sweden. Its political group in the European Parliament is the Progressive Alliance of Socialists and Democrats (S&D). The PES also operates in the European Committee of the Regions (in the PES Group in the Committee of the Regions) and the European Council.

== Name ==
The party's English name is "Party of European Socialists"; in several other languages, it translates to "Party of European Social-democrats". The following names are used in other languages:

- Albanian: Partia e Socialistëve Europianë
- Bosnian: Stranka evropskih socijalista
- Bulgarian: Партия на европейските социалисти
- Croatian: Stranka europskih socijalista
- Czech: Strana evropských socialistů
- Danish: De Europæiske Socialdemokrater
- Dutch: Partij van Europese Socialisten
- Estonian: Euroopa Sotsialistlik Partei
- Finnish: Euroopan sosialidemokraattinen puolue
- French: Parti socialiste européen
- German: Sozialdemokratische Partei Europas
- Greek: Ευρωπαϊκό Σοσιαλιστικό Κόμμα
- Hebrew: מפלגת הסוציאליסטים האירופאים
- Hungarian: Európai Szocialisták Pártja
- Icelandic: Flokkur evrópskra sósíalista
- Irish: Páirtí na Sóisialaithe Eorpach
- Italian: Partito del Socialismo Europeo
- Latvian: Eiropas Sociāldemokrātiskā partija
- Lithuanian: Europos socialistų partija
- Luxembourgish: Partei vun den Europäesche Sozialisten
- Macedonian: Партија на европските социјалисти
- Maltese: Partit Soċjalista Ewropew
- Norwegian: Det europeiske sosialdemokratiske partiet
- Polish: Partia Europejskich Socjalistów
- Portuguese: Partido Socialista Europeu
- Romanian: Partidul Socialiștilor Europeni
- Serbian: Партија европских социјалиста
- Slovak: Strana európskych socialistov
- Slovene: Stranka evropskih socialistov
- Spanish: Partido Socialista Europeo
- Swedish: Europeiska socialdemokratiska partiet
- Turkish: Avrupa Sosyalistler Partisi

In March 2014 following the congress in Rome, the PES added the tagline "Socialists and Democrats" to its name following the admission of Italy's Democratic Party into the organisation.

== History ==
=== 1960s ===
In 1961, the Socialists in the European Parliament attempted to produce a common 'European Socialist Programme' but this was neglected due to the applications of Britain, Denmark, Ireland and Norway to join the European Community. The Socialists' 1962 congress pushed for greater democratisation and powers for Parliament, though it was only in 1969 that this possibility was examined by the member states.

=== 1970s ===
In 1973, Denmark, Ireland and the United Kingdom joined the European Community, bringing in new parties from these countries. The enlarged Socialist Congress met in Bonn and inaugurated the Confederation of the Socialist Parties of the European Community. The Congress also passed a resolution on social policy, including the right to decent work, social security, democracy and equality in the European economy. In 1978, the Confederation of Socialist Parties approved the first common European election Manifesto. It focused on several goals among which the most important were to ensure a right to decent work, fight pollution, end discrimination, protect the consumer and promote peace, human rights and civil liberties.

=== 1980s ===
At its Luxembourg Congress in 1980, the Confederation of Socialist Parties approved its first Statute. The accession of Greece to the EU in 1981, followed by Spain and Portugal in 1986, brought in more parties.

In 1984, a common Socialist election manifesto proposed a socialist remedy for the economic crisis of the time by establishing a link between industrial production, protection of fundamental social benefits, and the fight for an improved quality of life.

=== 1990s ===
In 1992, with the European Community becoming the European Union and with the Treaty of Maastricht establishing the framework for political parties at a European level, the Confederation of Socialist Parties voted to transform itself into the Party of European Socialists. The party's first programme concentrated on job creation, democracy, gender equality, environmental and consumer protection, peace and security, regulation of immigration, discouragement of racism and fighting organised crime.

Along with the Socialist Group in the European Parliament, the founding members of the PES were:

- Social Democratic Party of Austria
- Socialist Party (Francophone) and the Socialist Party (Flemish) of Belgium
- Social Democrats of Denmark
- Socialist Party of France
- Social Democratic Party of Germany
- Panhellenic Socialist Movement of Greece
- Labour Party of Ireland
- Italian Democratic Socialist Party, Italian Socialist Party and Democratic Party of the Left of Italy
- Luxembourg Socialist Workers' Party
- Labour Party of the Netherlands
- Socialist Party of Portugal
- Spanish Socialist Workers' Party
- Swedish Social Democratic Party
- Labour Party and Social Democratic and Labour Party of the UK

=== 2000s ===
In 2004, Poul Nyrup Rasmussen defeated Giuliano Amato to be elected President of the PES, succeeding Robin Cook in the post. He was re-elected for a further 2.5 years at the PES Congress in Porto on 8 December 2006 and again at the Prague Congress in 2009.

=== 2010s ===
In 2010, the Foundation for European Progressive Studies was founded as the European political foundation (think tank) of the PES.

Mr Rasmussen stood down at the PES Progressive Convention in Brussels on 24 November 2011. He was replaced as interim president by Sergey Stanishev, at the time chairman of the Bulgarian Socialist Party (BSP) and former prime minister of Bulgaria.

On 28–29 September 2012, the PES Congress in Brussels Congress elected interim president Sergey Stanishev as full President, as well as four deputies: Jean-Christophe Cambadélis (1st Vice-President – PS), Elena Valenciano (PSOE), Jan Royall (Labour) and Katarína Neveďalová (Smer-SD). The same Congress elected Achim Post (SPD) as its new secretary general, and adopted a process which it described as "democratic and transparent" for electing its next candidate for Commission President in 2014. Sergey Stanishev was re-elected PES President on 22–23 June 2015 in Budapest. The Congress also approved Achim Post (SPD) as the Secretary-General as well as the four Vice-Presidents: Jean-Christophe Cambadélis (PS), Carin Jämtin (Swedish Social Democratic Party), Katarína Neveďalová (Smer-SD) and Jan Royall (Labour).

On 7–8 December 2018, the PES Congress gathered in Lisbon to elect its leadership. Sergey Stanishev was confirmed as party President and Achim Post (SPD) as secretary general. Iratxe García (Spanish Socialist Workers' Party) was elected by the new presidency 1st Vice-President of the PES and Francisco André (Socialist Party (Portugal)), Katarína Neveďalová (Smer-SD) and Marita Ulvskog (Swedish Social Democratic Party) were elected PES Vice-Presidents. During the PES Presidency of October 2019, Heléne Fritzon (Swedish Social Democratic Party) became PES Vice-President, replacing Marita Ulvskog.

On 22–23 February 2019, the PES held its Election Congress in Madrid to endorse a Common Candidate and adopt its manifesto for the 2019 European Parliament election. The Election Congress acclaimed European Commission First Vice-President Frans Timmermans and adopted its manifesto: A New Social Contract for Europe.

=== 2020s ===
On 16 December 2021, the PES held its Council in Brussels, adopting the resolution: Fairness, Sustainability, Respect: a progressive vision for the future of Europe.

On 14–15 October 2022, the PES Congress in Berlin elected Stefan Löfven (Swedish Social Democratic Party) as PES President and welcomed a new PES leadership team: Caroline Gennez (Vooruit (political party)) as Treasurer, Iratxe García (Spanish Socialist Workers' Party) as First Vice President, Katarina Barley (SPD) and Francisco André (Socialist Party (Portugal)) as Executive Vice Presidents, Tanja Fajon (Social Democrats (Slovenia)), Victor Negrescu (Social Democratic Party (Romania)), Kati Piri (Labour Party (Netherlands)), Andrzej Szejna (New Left), and Radmila Šekerinska (Social Democratic Union of Macedonia) as Vice Presidents. Achim Post (SPD) continued as Secretary General, Giacomo Filibeck (Democratic Party (Italy)) took up the position of Executive Secretary General, Yonnec Polet (Socialist Party (Belgium)) remained as Deputy Secretary General, and Saar van Bueren (Labour Party (Netherlands)) became Deputy Secretary General. The Congress adopted the resolution: With Courage For Europe: leading Europe through change.

On 29 June 2023, Georgian Dream was removed from the PES due to activities and positions far outside PES values.

On 12 October, after the 2023 Slovak parliamentary election, the PES suspended Smer-SD and Hlas-SD over their plans to enter into coalition with the ultranationalist Slovak National Party (SNS), which the PES views as a "radical-right party." On 17 October 2025, SMER was expelled from the Party of European Socialists in a unanimous vote for violations of the group's values by party leader Robert Fico.

On 2 March 2024, the PES held its Election Congress in Rome and acclaimed European Commissioner Nicolas Schmit as presidential candidate and adopted its election programme.

== Membership ==
The PES has thirty-three full member parties from each of the twenty-seven EU member states, Norway and the UK. There are a further twelve associate and twelve observer parties from other European countries.

=== Full members ===
| State | Name | abbr. | MEPs (Note: The number of MEPs listed below may not match the total number of MEPs of the European party, as it does not include MEPs who join as individual members.) | National MPs |
|---|---|---|---|---|
| Austria | Social Democratic Party of Austria; Sozialdemokratische Partei Österreichs | SPÖ | 5 / 19 | 40 / 183 19 / 62 |
| Belgium | Socialist Party; Parti socialiste | PS | 2 / 8 (Note: French-speaking seats) | 19 / 63 7 / 24 |
| Belgium | Forward; Vooruit | Vooruit | 1 / 13 (Note: Flemish seats) | 9 / 87 4 / 35 |
| Bulgaria | Bulgarian Socialist Party; Българска социалистическа партия Bulgarska sotsialisticheska partiya | BSP | 2 / 17 | 0 / 240 |
| Croatia | Social Democratic Party of Croatia; Socijaldemokratska partija Hrvatske | SDP | 4 / 12 | 37 / 151 |
| Cyprus | Movement for Social Democracy; Κίνημα Σοσιαλδημοκρατών; Kinima Sosialdimokraton | EDEK | 1 / 6 | 0 / 56 |
| Czech Republic | Social Democracy; Sociální demokracie | SOCDEM | 0 / 21 | 0 / 200 0 / 81 |
| Denmark | Social Democrats; Socialdemokraterne | A | 3 / 14 | 38 / 179 |
| Estonia | Social Democratic Party; Sotsiaaldemokraatlik Erakond | SDE | 2 / 7 | 9 / 101 |
| Finland | Social Democratic Party of Finland; Suomen sosialidemokraattinen puolue Finlands socialdemokratiska parti | SDP | 2 / 14 | 43 / 200 |
| France | Socialist Party; Parti socialiste | PS | 10 / 79 | 65 / 348 28 / 577 |
| France | Public Square; Place Publique | PP | 3 / 79 | 2 / 348 2 / 577 |
| Germany | Social Democratic Party of Germany; Sozialdemokratische Partei Deutschlands | SPD | 16 / 96 | 120 / 630 (Bundestag) 19 / 69 (Bundesrat) |
| Greece | PASOK – Movement for Change; Πανελλήνιο Σοσιαλιστικό Κίνημα – Κίνημα Αλλαγής; Panellínio Sosialistikó Kínima– Kínima Allagís | PASOK-KINAL | 3 / 21 | 33 / 300 |
| Hungary | Democratic Coalition; Demokratikus Koalíció | DK | 2 / 21 | 0 / 199 |
| Hungary | Hungarian Socialist Party; Magyar Szocialista Párt | MSZP | 0 / 21 | 0 / 199 |
| Ireland | Labour Party; Páirtí an Lucht Oibre | Lab | 1 / 14 | 2 / 60 11 / 174 |
| Italy | Democratic Party; Partito Democratico | PD | 20 / 76 | 39 / 200 71 / 400 |
| Italy | Italian Socialist Party; Partito Socialista Italiano | PSI | 0 / 76 | 0 / 200 0 / 400 |
| Latvia | Social Democratic Party "Harmony"; Sociāldemokrātiskā partija "Saskaņa" | SDPS | 1 / 8 | 0 / 100 |
| Lithuania | Social Democratic Party of Lithuania; Lietuvos socialdemokratų partija | LSDP | 2 / 11 | 52 / 141 |
| Luxembourg | Luxembourg Socialist Workers' Party; Lëtzebuerger Sozialistesch Aarbechterpartei; Parti ouvrier socialiste luxembourgeois Luxemburger Sozialistische Arbeiterpartei | LSAP | 1 / 6 | 10 / 60 |
| Malta | Labour Party; Partit Laburista | PL | 4 / 6 | 42 / 69 |
| Netherlands | Progressive Netherlands; Progressief Nederland | PRO | 8 / 31 | 14 / 75 20 / 150 |
| Norway | Labour Party; Arbeiderpartiet | AP | Not in EU | 53 / 169 |
| Poland | New Left; Nowa Lewica | NL | 5 / 52 | 9 / 100 26 / 460 |
| Portugal | Socialist Party; Partido Socialista | PS | 8 / 21 | 58 / 230 |
| Romania | Social Democratic Party; Partidul Social Democrat | PSD | 8 / 33 | 47 / 136 109 / 330 |
| Slovenia | Social Democrats; Socialni demokrati | SD | 2 / 8 | 7 / 90 |
| Spain | Spanish Socialist Workers' Party; Partido Socialista Obrero Español | PSOE | 21 / 58 | 89 / 265 121 / 350 |
| Sweden | Swedish Social Democratic Party; Sveriges socialdemokratiska arbetareparti | SAP | 5 / 21 | 107 / 349 |
| United Kingdom | Labour Party | Labour | Not in EU | 213 / 830 404 / 632 |
| United Kingdom | Social Democratic and Labour Party; Páirtí Sóisialta Daonlathach an Lucht Oibre | SDLP | Not in EU | 0 / 794 2 / 18 |

=== Associated members ===
| State | Name | abbr. | MEPs | National MPs |
|---|---|---|---|---|
| Albania | Socialist Party of Albania; Partia Socialiste e Shqipërisë | PSS | | 82 / 140 |
| Bosnia and Herzegovina | Social Democratic Party of Bosnia and Herzegovina; Socijaldemokratska partija Bosne i Hercegovine | SDP | | 0 / 15 5 / 42 |
| Bulgaria | Party of Bulgarian Social Democrats; Партия Български социалдемократи Partiya Bulgarski Sotsialdemokrati | PBS | 0 / 17 | 1 / 240 |
| Iceland | Social Democratic Alliance; Samfylkingin | Samf. | | 15 / 63 |
| Kosovo | Self-Determination Movement; Lëvizja Vetëvendosje | LVV | | 56 / 120 |
| Moldova | European Social Democratic Party; Partidul Social Democrat European | PSDE | | 0 / 101 |
| Montenegro | Democratic Party of Socialists of Montenegro; Demokratska partija socijalista Crne Gore | DPS | | 17 / 81 |
| Montenegro | Social Democratic Party of Montenegro; Socijaldemokratska partija Crne Gore | SDP | | 0 / 81 |
| North Macedonia | Social Democratic Union of Macedonia; Социјалдемократски сојуз на Македонија; Socijaldemokratski Sojuz na Makedonija | SDSM | | 18 / 120 |
| Slovakia | Voice – Social Democracy (suspended); Hlas – sociálna demokracia | Hlas-SD | 1 / 15 | 27 / 150 |
| Serbia | Party of Freedom and Justice; Странка слободе и правде Stranka slobode i pravde | SSP | | 16 / 250 |
| Serbia | Democratic Party; Демократска странка Demokratska stranka | DS | | 8 / 250 |
| Switzerland | Social Democratic Party of Switzerland; Sozialdemokratische Partei der Schweiz; Parti socialiste suisse Partito Socialista Svizzero; Partida Socialdemocrata de la Svizra | SP/PS | | 39 / 200 9 / 46 |
| Turkey | New Party; YENİ Parti | YEP | | 91 / 600 |
| Turkey | Peoples' Equality and Democracy Party; Halkların Eşitlik ve Demokrasi Partisi; Partiya Wekhevî û Demokrasiya Gelan | DEM | | 56 / 600 |
| Turkey | Republican People's Party (suspended); Cumhuriyet Halk Partisi | CHP | | 44 / 600 |

=== Observer members ===
| State | Name | abbr. | MEPs | National MPs |
|---|---|---|---|---|
| Andorra | Social Democratic Party; Partit Socialdemòcrata | PS | | 3 / 28 |
| Armenia | Armenian Revolutionary Federation; Հայ Յեղափոխական Դաշնակցութիւն; Hay Yeghap’vokhakan Dashnakts’ut’iwn | ARF | | 10 / 107 |
| Belarus | Hramada; Беларуская сацыял-дэмакратычная партыя (Грамада́); Biełaruskaja sacyjał-demakratyčeskaja partija (Hromada) | БСДП | | Parties banned |
| Belarus | Narodna Hramada; Беларуская сацыял-дэмакратычная партыя (Народная Грамада); Bielaruskaja Sacyjal-Demakratyčnaja Partyja (Narodnaja Hramada) | БСДП (НГ) | | Parties banned |
| Egypt | Egyptian Social Democratic Party الحزب المصرى الديمقراطى الاجتماعى al-Ḥizb al-Maṣrī al-Dimuqrāṭī al-Ijtmāʿī | ESDP | | 4 / 596 |
| Israel | Democrats הדמוקרטים | Democrats | | 8 / 120 |
| Latvia | Latvian Social Democratic Workers' Party; Latvijas Sociāldemokrātiskā strādnieku partija | LSDSP | 0 / 8 | 0 / 100 |
| Morocco | Socialist Union of Popular Forces الاتحاد الاشتراكي للقوات الشعبية; Al-Ittihad Al-Ishtirakiy Lilqawat Al-Sha'abiyah; Union Socialiste des Forces Populaires | USFP | | 24 / 270 20 / 395 |
| Northern Cyprus | Republican Turkish Party; Cumhuriyetçi Türk Partisi | CTP | | 12 / 50 |
| Palestine | Fatah فتح; Fatḥ | فتح | | 45 / 132 |
| Romania | PRO Romania; PRO România | PRO | 0 / 33 | 0 / 330 |
| San Marino | Party of Socialists and Democrats; Partito dei Socialisti e dei Democratici | PSD | | 3 / 60 |
| Tunisia | Democratic Forum for Labour and Liberties التكتل الديمقراطي من أجل العمل والحريات at-Takattul ad-Dīmuqrāṭī min ajl il-‘Amal wal-Ḥurriyyāt; Forum démocratique pour le travail et les libertés | FDTL | | 0 / 217 |

=== Individual members ===
The PES also includes a number of individual members, although, as most other European parties, it has not sought to develop mass individual membership.

Below is the evolution of individual membership of the PES since 2019.

== Organisation ==
=== Constituent organisations ===
The youth organisation of the PES is the Young European Socialists. PES Women is the party's women's organisation, led by Zita Gurmai. The LGBTI campaign organisation is Rainbow Rose.

=== International memberships ===
PES is an associated organisation of Socialist International and the Progressive Alliance.

=== President and Presidency ===
The President (currently former Prime Minister of Sweden Stefan Löfven) represents the party on a daily basis and chairs the Presidency, which also consists of the Secretary General, President of the S&D group in Parliament and one representative per full/associate member party and organisation. They may also be joined by the President of the European Parliament (if a PES member), a PES European Commissioner and a representative from associate parties and organisations.

As of 19 November 2024 the Presidency of the PES is:

- (Sweden) Stefan Löfven – President
- (Spain) Iratxe García – First Vice-President
- (Germany) Katarina Barley – Executive Vice-President
- (Slovenia) Tanja Fajon – Vice-President
- (Romania) Victor Negrescu – Vice-President
- (Netherlands) Kati Piri – Vice-President
- (Poland) Andrzej Szejna – Vice-President
- (Belgium) Caroline Gennez – Treasurer
- (Italy) Giacomo Filibeck – Secretary General

The list below shows PES presidents and the presidents of its predecessors.

| # | Portrait | President | State | Term in office | | National party |
| # | Portrait | President | State | Start | End | National party |
|---|---|---|---|---|---|---|
| 1 | | Wilhelm Dröscher | West Germany | April 1974 | January 1979 | SPD |
| 2 | | Robert Pontillon | France | January 1979 | March 1980 | PS |
| 3 | | Joop den Uyl | Netherlands | March 1980 | May 1987 | PvdA |
| 4 | | Vítor Constâncio | Portugal | May 1987 | January 1989 | PS |
| 5 | | Guy Spitaels | Belgium | February 1989 | May 1992 | PS |
| 6 | | Willy Claes | Belgium | November 1992 | October 1994 | SP.A |
| 7 | | Rudolf Scharping | Germany | March 1995 | May 2001 | SPD |
| 8 | | Robin Cook | United Kingdom | May 2001 | 24 April 2004 | Labour |
| 9 | | Poul Nyrup Rasmussen | Denmark | 24 April 2004 | 24 November 2011 | S |
| 10 | | Sergey Stanishev | Bulgaria | 24 November 2011 | 14 October 2022 | BSP |
| 11 | | Stefan Löfven | Sweden | 14 October 2022 | Incumbent | S |

=== Governance ===
The parties meet at the party Congress twice every five years to decide on political orientation, such as adopting manifestos ahead of elections. Every year that the Congress does not meet, the Council (a smaller version of the Congress) shapes PES policy. The Congress also elects the party's President, Vice-Presidents and the Presidency.

The Leader's Conference brings together Prime Ministers and Party Leaders from PES parties three to four times a year to agree strategies and resolutions.

=== European election primaries ===
In December 2009, the PES decided to put forward a candidate for Commission President at all subsequent elections. On 1 March 2014, the PES organised for the first time a European election Congress where a Common Manifesto was adopted and the Common Candidate designate for the post of Commission President, Martin Schulz, was elected by over a thousand participants in Rome, Italy. In 2019, progressives elected Frans Timmermans as PES Common Candidate to the European Elections, during the Election Congress in Madrid on 22–23 February 2019.

== Funding ==
As a registered European political party, the PES is entitled to European public funding, which it has received continuously since 2004.

Below is the evolution of European public funding received by the PES.

In line with the Regulation on European political parties and European political foundations, the PES also raises private funds to co-finance its activities. As of 2025, European parties must raise at least 10% of their reimbursable expenditure from private sources, while the rest can be covered using European public funding. (Note: For the purpose of European party funding, "contributions" refer to financial or in-kind support provided by party members, while "donations" refer to the same but provided by non-members.)

Below is the evolution of contributions and donations received by the PES.

== PES in the European institutions ==
=== Overview of the European institutions ===
| Organisation | Institution | Number of seats |
|---|---|---|
| European Union | European Parliament | 134 / 720 (19%) |
| European Union | European Commission | 4 / 27 (15%) |
| European Union | European Council (Heads of Government) | 3 / 27 (11%) |
| European Union | Council of the European Union (Participation in Government) | |
| European Union | Committee of the Regions | 86 / 329 (26%) |
| Council of Europe (as part of SOC) | Parliamentary Assembly | 157 / 612 (26%) |

=== European Commission ===
European Commissioners are meant to remain independent, however there has been an increasing degree of politicisation within the Commission. In the current European Commission, five of the Commissioners belong to the PES family.

| Portfolio | Commissioner | State | Political party | Photo |
|---|---|---|---|---|
| Executive Vice-President for a Clean, Just and Competitive Transition | Teresa Ribera | Spain | PSOE | |
| Executive Vice-President for Social Rights and Skills, Quality Jobs and Preparedness | Roxana Mînzatu | Romania | PSD | |
| Commissioner for Trade and Economic Security; Commissioner for Interinstitutional Relations and Transparency | Maroš Šefčovič | Slovakia | Smer–SD (susp.) | |
| Commissioner for Energy and Housing | Dan Jørgensen | Denmark | S | |
| Commissioner for Intergenerational Fairness, Youth, Culture and Sport | Glenn Micallef | Malta | PL | |

=== European Council ===
Of the 27 heads of state and government that are members of the European Council, three are from the PES, and therefore regularly attend PES summits to prepare for European Council meetings.

| Member State | Representative | Title | Political party | Member of the Council since | Photo |
|---|---|---|---|---|---|
| Denmark | Mette Frederiksen | Prime Minister | Social Democrats | 27 June 2019 | |
| Malta | Robert Abela | Prime Minister | PL | 13 January 2020 | |
| Spain | Pedro Sánchez | Prime Minister | PSOE | 2 June 2018 | 100x |

=== In third countries ===
Through its associate and observer parties the PES has six heads of state or government in non-EU countries:

| State | Representative | Title | Political party | In power since | Portrait |
|---|---|---|---|---|---|
| Albania | Edi Rama | Prime Minister | PS | 13 September 2013 | |
| Bosnia and Herzegovina | Denis Bećirović | Bosniak Member of the Presidency | SDP BiH | 16 November 2022 | |
| Norway | Jonas Gahr Støre | Prime Minister | A/Ap | 14 October 2021 | |
| Switzerland | Élisabeth Baume-Schneider | Federal Councillor | SP | 1 January 2023 | |
| Switzerland | Beat Jans | Federal Councillor | SP | 1 January 2024 | |
| United Kingdom | Andy Burnham | Prime Minister | Labour | 20 July 2026 | |

=== European Council and Council of Ministers ===

Party-alignment at the European Council is often loose, but has been the basis of some intergovernmental cooperation. At present five countries are led by a PES-affiliated leader, who represents that state at the European Council: Spain (Pedro Sánchez), Malta (Robert Abela), and Denmark (Mette Frederiksen).

The makeup of national delegations to the Council of Ministers is at some times subject to coalitions: for the above governments led by a PES party, that party may not be present in all Council configurations; in other governments led by non-PES parties a PES minister may be its representative for certain portfolios. PES is in coalition in the following countries: Romania, Belgium, Slovenia and Estonia.

==== Overview ====
| State | Governing parties | Affiliated EU party | Population |
|---|---|---|---|
| Germany | Christian Democratic Union; Social Democratic Party; Christian Social Union in Bavaria | EPP PES; EPP | 83,166,711 |
| Spain | Spanish Socialist Workers' Party; MS; United Left; Catalunya en Comú; Más Madrid | PES; None; PEL; EGP; None | 48,619,695 |
| Poland | Civic Coalition; New Left; Poland 2050; Polish People’s Party; Modern; Polish Initiative | EPP; PES; None; EPP; ALDE; None | 38,036,118 |
| Belgium | New Flemish Alliance; Reformist Movement; Les Engagés; Vooruit; Christian Democratic and Flemish | EFA; ALDE; EDP; PES; EPP | 11,763,650 |
| Austria | Austrian People's Party; Social Democratic Party of Austria; NEOS | EPP; PES; ALDE | 9,219,113 |
| Denmark | Social Democrats; Green Left; Moderates; Social Liberals | PES; EGP; ALDE; ALDE | 5,982,117 |
| Cyprus | Democratic Party | PES | 1,382,300 |
| Malta | Labour Party | PES | 514,564 |

=== Committee of the Regions ===
PES has 122 members in the Committee of the Regions as of 2014.

== Election results ==
European Parliament

| Year | | Lead Candidate | Vote % | Seats % | Seats | +/- | Status | Ref |
|---|---|---|---|---|---|---|---|---|
| 2014 | | Martin Schulz | 24.4% (#1) | | 191 / 720 | ▲8 | Coalition | |
| 2019 | Pre-Brexit | Frans Timmermans | 18.5 (#2) | 19.4 (#2) | 146 / 751 | | Coalition | |
| 2019 | Post-Brexit | Frans Timmermans | | 19.7 (#2) | 139 / 705 | ▼7 | Coalition | |
| 2024 | | Nicolas Schmit | 15.6% (#2) | 17.6 (#2) | 127 / 720 | ▼12 | Coalition | |

== See also ==
- European political party
- Authority for European Political Parties and European Political Foundations
- European political foundation
