= Furniture & Home Improvement Ombudsman =

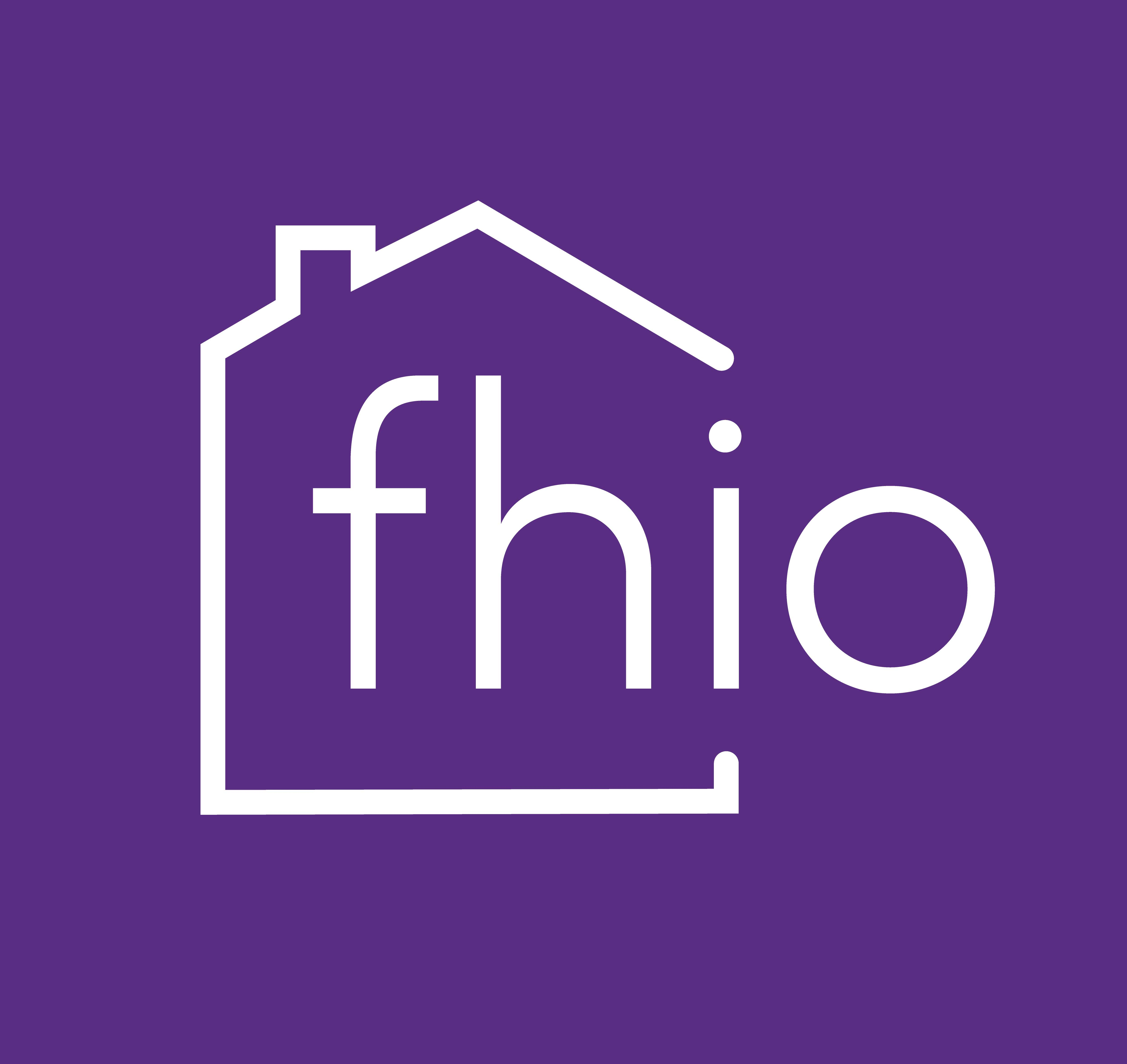
The Furniture & Home Improvement Ombudsman

The Furniture & Home Improvement Ombudsman (FHIO), formerly The Furniture Ombudsman (TFO) is an independent not for profit organisation based in the United Kingdom. It specialises in alternative dispute resolution for customers of its members in the retail, furniture and home improvement industries. As a membership-based scheme, it also provides training and education services to its members which aim to raise standards, improve service and inspire consumer confidence.

== History ==
=== Qualitas ===
TFO was established after critical reports from the UK Office of Fair Trading regarding the furniture industry – a 1986 discussion paper, The Protection of Consumer Prepayments, and, in 1990, Furniture and Carpets - A report by the Director General of Fair Trading. This recommended industry reforms relating to: labelling, consumer buying advice, deposits, quality, delivery damage, and compliance with codes of practice. The report was also critical of the furniture industry stating:

"if the industry cannot, or will not, improve the situation of its own volition, the Office will have no option but to consider whether legislation is appropriate... the Office will expect the trade associations to take the lead in re-examining this question, and in putting forward proposals for the establishment of a deposit protection." (para 1.8)

As a consequence, in 1992 several trade associations, in conjunction with manufacturers and retailers, formed the 'Furniture and Carpet Action Group' which became a company (limited by guarantee) and ultimately became 'Qualitas Furnishing Standards Ltd'. Contrary to representations made by the organisation it was not created by or in conjunction with the OFT; the OFT was merely a passive observer.

Further OFT investigations led to several home improvement organisations agreeing to undertakings mandating their membership of a deposit protection scheme. The OFT agreed that a scheme proposed by Qualitas was acceptable; as a result, Tesco Kitchens & Bathrooms, B&Q, Moben, Kitchens Direct, MFI and Magnet became members of Qualitas in the early 2000s (decade).

Originally based in central London, Qualitas struggled to gain traction in the industry, and was purchased by the Furniture Industry Research Association (FIRA) in the late 1990s and moved to FIRA's Stevenage office in Hertfordshire.

=== TFO ===
The name The Furniture Ombudsman (TFO) was adopted in January 2007. Kevin Grix, a non-practising barrister, was appointed the Chief Ombudsman in 2008.

In 2011 TFO applied for membership of the OFT's Consumer Codes Approval Scheme (CCAS). When this scheme closed in 2013, membership had not been granted. Oversight of the CCAS was passed to the Trading Standards Institute in 2013 who took over consideration of TFO's application.

In 2014 TFO was re-established as a not for profit company outside of the control and ownership of FIRA.

TFO provides a testing and inspection service, training services (in consumer law and complaint handling, primarily to businesses) and a dispute resolution service. The latter is the most significant aspect of its business and is based around a code of practice and basic consumer and contract law.

Several bodies refer consumers to TFO, including the Trading Standards Institute, Citizens Advice Bureau and the European Commission. TFO is a full ombudsman member of the Ombudsman Association.

=== FHIO ===
The company re-branded to the Furniture & Home Improvement Ombudsman (FHIO) in August 2020.

== Jurisdiction ==
FHIO members are retail, furniture and home improvement outlets in the United Kingdom. All full members pledge to abide by a code of practice which bestows additional rights and assurances on consumers who shop with them.

Most complaints that FHIO investigates are about upholstered furniture, beds and fitted kitchens. However, it also deals with complaints about other domestic furniture such as dining room tables, chairs, bathrooms and home offices.

== Case statistics ==
FHIO publishes an annual review giving facts and figures relating to its work and case decisions.

In its 2011 annual review, TFO stated that in the year ending August 2011 it made 51% of its decisions in favour of the consumer, either in full or in part. In the year ending August 2012 it made 53% of its decisions in favour of the consumer, either in full or in part.

In the 2016 annual review 52% decisions were found in favour of the consumer (awards can include full refund, repair, replacement, additional work and/or compensation); 36.5% were split decisions (some parts are upheld).

== Criticism ==
In December 2011 The Guardian published an article questioning the independence of expert reports produced by FIRA, whose independent expert evidence was relied upon in determining disputes between consumers and retail members of TFO.

In December 2017 The Guardian raised fresh concerns about the impartiality of the Furniture Ombudsman scheme, saying Guardian Money had seen many complaints from consumers who felt the process was unfairly stacked in the retailers’ favour.
