= Stevenage (constituency) =

UK Parliament constituency (since 1983)

Coordinates: 51°53′N 0°10′W

- County constituency for the House of Commons
- Interactive map of boundaries since 2024
- Location within the East of England
- County: Hertfordshire
- Electorate: 70,370 (March 2020)
- Major settlements: Knebworth, Stevenage

Current constituency
- Created: 1983
- Member of Parliament: Kevin Bonavia (Labour)
- Seats: One
- Created from: Hertford & Stevenage, Hitchin and East Hertfordshire

Stevenage is a constituency (Note: A county constituency (for the purposes of election expenses and type of returning officer)) in Hertfordshire represented in the House of Commons of the UK Parliament since 2024 by Kevin Bonavia, a member of the Labour Party.

== Constituency profile ==
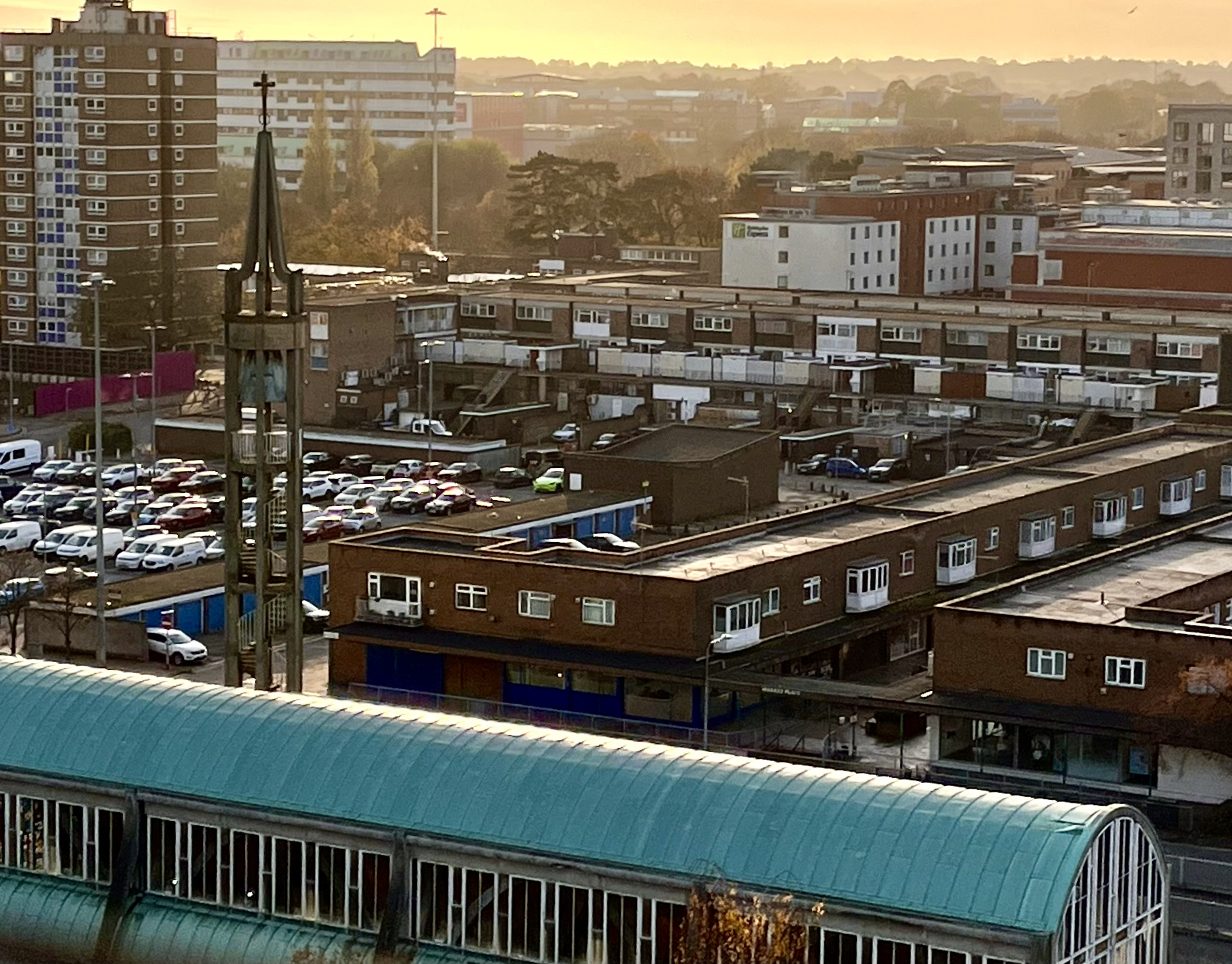
Stevenage

Stevenage is a constituency in Hertfordshire in the East of England. It covers the town and borough of Stevenage, which has a population of around 92,000, and the outlying villages of Codicote, Knebworth and Datchworth.

Stevenage was traditionally a rural market town that was greatly expanded after World War II; it was the first town in the UK to be designated as a new town, done to alleviate housing shortages in London which is located around 28 miles (45 km) to the south. Most of the town has average levels of wealth and deprivation whilst the outer suburbs and villages are affluent. Stevenage is densely-populated with most residents living in flats or terraces, and house prices are generally similar to the regional and UK averages.

Stevenage has low proportions of students and retirees and an above-average population of middle-aged adults with families. Residents have high levels of income but below-average rates of homeownership. The child poverty rate is low. Residents have average levels of education and a high proportion work in the health, manufacturing and construction sectors. The percentage claiming unemployment benefits is low. White people made up 84% of the population at the 2021 census. Asians were the largest ethnic minority group at 7%.

At the local council level, most of the constituency is represented by the Labour Party with some Liberal Democrats elected in the wealthier eastern suburbs and rural villages. Reform UK representatives were elected across the town at recent borough and county council elections. An estimated 58% of voters in Stevenage supported leaving the European Union in the 2016 referendum, higher than the UK-wide figure of 52%.

== History ==
The constituency was created in 1983 primarily from the abolished seat of Hertford and Stevenage. A Southern England new town seat with volatile voting patterns, like its main predecessor, it was a bellwether of the national result; it was Conservative held between 1983 and 1997 until Labour easily gained it, but their winning margin in 2005 was small and the Conservatives gained the seat at the 2010 election, it being their 72nd target. It remained Conservative until 2024 when it was regained by Labour amidst their national landslide victory.

The seat was held for Labour by Barbara Follett who achieved two ministerial roles from 2007 until 2010.

== Boundaries and boundary changes ==
| Dates | Local authority | Maps | Wards |
|---|---|---|---|
| 1983–1997 | Borough of Stevenage; District of North Hertfordshire; District of East Hertfordshire | | Borough of Stevenage; District of North Hertfordshire wards of Codicote and Knebworth; District of East Hertfordshire wards of Cottered, Datchworth, Mundern, Walkern, and Watton-at-Stone. |
| 1997–2010 | Borough of Stevenage; District of North Hertfordshire; District of East Hertfordshire | | Borough of Stevenage; District of North Hertfordshire wards of Codicote and Knebworth; District of East Hertfordshire wards of Datchworth and Walkern. |
| 2010–2024 | Borough of Stevenage; District of North Hertfordshire; District of East Hertfordshire | | Borough of Stevenage; District of North Hertfordshire wards of Codicote and Knebworth; District of East Hertfordshire ward of Datchworth and Aston. |
| 2024–present | Borough of Stevenage; District of North Hertfordshire; District of East Hertfordshire | | Borough of Stevenage; the Knebworth ward and part of the Codicote & Kimpton ward (comprising the parishes of Knebworth and Codicote) in the District of North Hertfordshire; part of the ward of Aston, Datchworth & Walkern in the District of East Hertfordshire, (comprising the parishes of Aston and Datchworth). |

=== Historic ===
==== 1983–1997 ====
The constituency was formed primarily from the majority of the abolished constituency of Hertford and Stevenage. The wards of Codicote and Knebworth were transferred from the abolished constituency of Hitchin, and the wards of Cottered and Mundern from the abolished constituency of East Hertfordshire.

==== 1997–2010 ====
The District of East Hertfordshire wards of Cottered, Mundern and Watton-at-Stone were transferred to the new constituency of North East Hertfordshire.

==== 2010–2024 ====
Walkern ward transferred to North East Hertfordshire.

=== Current ===
The 2023 review of Westminster constituencies, which was based on the ward structures in place on 1 December 2020, left the boundaries virtually unchanged. However, following local government boundary reviews in East Hertfordshire and North Hertfordshire which came into effect in May 2023 and May 2024 respectively, the contents of the constituency were revised (see table above).

The constituency comprises the Borough of Stevenage, together with the villages of Codicote and Knebworth to the south and Aston and Datchworth to the east.

== Members of Parliament ==
Hertford & Stevenage prior to 1983

| Election | Member | Party |
|---|---|---|
| 1983 | Tim Wood | Conservative |
| 1997 | Barbara Follett | Labour |
| 2010 | Stephen McPartland | Conservative |
| 2024 | Kevin Bonavia | Labour |

== Elections ==
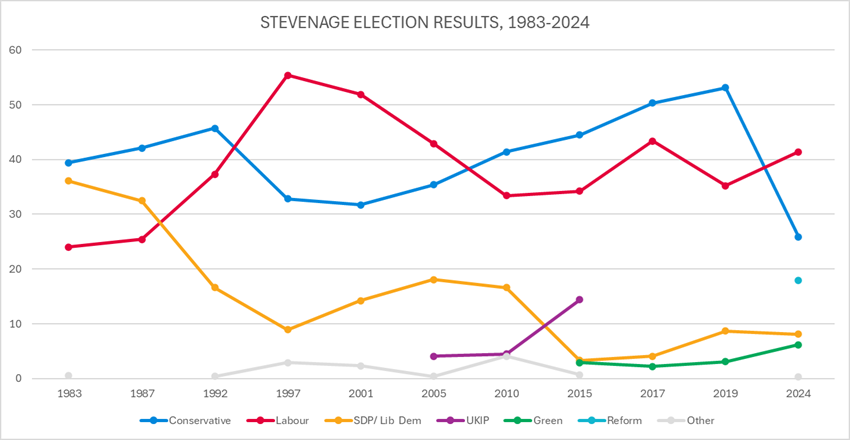
Election results 1983-2024

=== Elections in the 2020s ===
General election 2024: Stevenage
| Party | Candidate | Votes | % | ±% |
|---|---|---|---|---|
| Labour | Kevin Bonavia | 17,698 | 41.4 | +6.3 |
| Conservative | Alex Clarkson | 11,080 | 25.9 | –27.2 |
| Reform | Peter Hopper | 7,667 | 17.9 | N/A |
| Liberal Democrats | Lisa Nash | 3,467 | 8.1 | –0.5 |
| Green | Paul Dawson | 2,655 | 6.2 | +3.2 |
| CPA | Joshua Smith | 148 | 0.3 | N/A |
| Majority | | 6,618 | 15.5 | N/A |
| Turnout | | 42,715 | 61.0 | –5.7 |
| Registered electors | | 70,086 | | |
| Labour gain from Conservative | | Swing | ▲16.7 | |

=== Elections in the 2010s ===
General election 2019: Stevenage
| Party | Candidate | Votes | % | ±% |
|---|---|---|---|---|
| Conservative | Stephen McPartland | 25,328 | 53.1 | +2.8 |
| Labour | Jill Borcherds | 16,766 | 35.2 | –8.2 |
| Liberal Democrats | Lisa Nash | 4,132 | 8.7 | +4.5 |
| Green | Victoria Snelling | 1,457 | 3.1 | +0.9 |
| Majority | | 8,562 | 18.0 | +11.1 |
| Turnout | | 47,683 | 66.6 | –3.1 |
| Registered electors | | 71,562 | | |
| Conservative hold | | Swing | +5.5 | |

General election 2017: Stevenage
| Party | Candidate | Votes | % | ±% |
|---|---|---|---|---|
| Conservative | Stephen McPartland | 24,798 | 50.3 | +5.7 |
| Labour Co-op | Sharon Taylor | 21,414 | 43.4 | +9.2 |
| Liberal Democrats | Barbara Gibson | 2,032 | 4.1 | +0.8 |
| Green | Victoria Snelling | 1,085 | 2.2 | –0.7 |
| Majority | | 3,384 | 6.9 | –3.5 |
| Turnout | | 49,329 | 69.7 | +2.0 |
| Registered electors | | 70,765 | | |
| Conservative hold | | Swing | –1.8 | |

General election 2015: Stevenage
| Party | Candidate | Votes | % | ±% |
|---|---|---|---|---|
| Conservative | Stephen McPartland | 21,291 | 44.5 | +3.1 |
| Labour Co-op | Sharon Taylor | 16,336 | 34.2 | +0.8 |
| UKIP | David Collins | 6,864 | 14.4 | +9.9 |
| Liberal Democrats | Susan Van De Ven | 1,582 | 3.3 | −13.3 |
| Green | Graham White | 1,369 | 2.9 | New |
| TUSC | Trevor Palmer | 175 | 0.4 | New |
| English Democrat | Charles Vickers | 115 | 0.2 | −0.6 |
| Independent | David Cox | 67 | 0.1 | −0.0 |
| Majority | | 4,955 | 10.4 | +2.4 |
| Turnout | | 47,799 | 67.7 | +2.9 |
| Registered electors | | 70,597 | | |
| Conservative hold | | Swing | +1.2 | |

General election 2010: Stevenage
| Party | Candidate | Votes | % | ±% |
|---|---|---|---|---|
| Conservative | Stephen McPartland | 18,491 | 41.4 | +6.8 |
| Labour Co-op | Sharon Taylor | 14,913 | 33.4 | −9.8 |
| Liberal Democrats | Julia Davies | 7,432 | 16.6 | −2.0 |
| UKIP | Marion Mason | 2,004 | 4.5 | +1.3 |
| BNP | Michael Green | 1,007 | 2.3 | New |
| English Democrat | Charles Vickers | 366 | 0.8 | New |
| NCDMV! | Stephen Phillips | 327 | 0.7 | New |
| Independent | David Cox | 80 | 0.2 | New |
| Your Right To Democracy Party Ltd. | Andrew Ralph | 31 | 0.1 | New |
| Majority | | 3,578 | 8.0 | N/A |
| Turnout | | 44,651 | 64.8 | +2.1 |
| Registered electors | | 68,937 | | |
| Conservative gain from Labour | | Swing | +8.3 | |

=== Elections in the 2000s ===
2005 notional result
| Party | Vote | % |
|---|---|---|
| Labour | 17,650 | 43.2 |
| Conservative | 14,161 | 34.6 |
| Liberal Democrats | 7,611 | 18.6 |
| Others | 1,457 | 3.6 |
| Turnout | 40,879 | 62.7 |
| Electorate | 65,206 | |

General election 2005: Stevenage
| Party | Candidate | Votes | % | ±% |
|---|---|---|---|---|
| Labour | Barbara Follett | 18,003 | 42.9 | −8.9 |
| Conservative | George Freeman | 14,864 | 35.4 | +3.7 |
| Liberal Democrats | Julia Davies | 7,610 | 18.1 | +4.0 |
| UKIP | Victoria Peebles | 1,305 | 3.1 | New |
| Independent | Antal Losonczi | 152 | 0.4 | −0.4 |
| Majority | | 3,139 | 7.5 | −12.7 |
| Turnout | | 41,934 | 62.7 | +1.3 |
| Registered electors | | 66,889 | | |
| Labour hold | | Swing | −6.3 | |

General election 2001: Stevenage
| Party | Candidate | Votes | % | ±% |
|---|---|---|---|---|
| Labour | Barbara Follett | 22,025 | 51.9 | −3.5 |
| Conservative | Graeme Quar | 13,459 | 31.7 | −1.1 |
| Liberal Democrats | Harold Davies | 6,027 | 14.2 | +5.3 |
| Socialist Alliance | Stephen Glennon | 449 | 1.1 | New |
| Independent | Antal Losonczi | 320 | 0.8 | New |
| ProLife Alliance | Sarah Bell | 173 | 0.4 | +0.0 |
| Majority | | 8,566 | 20.2 | −2.4 |
| Turnout | | 42,453 | 60.7 | −15.5 |
| Registered electors | | 69,203 | | |
| Labour hold | | Swing | –1.2 | |

=== Elections in the 1990s ===
General election 1997: Stevenage
| Party | Candidate | Votes | % | ±% |
|---|---|---|---|---|
| Labour | Barbara Follett | 28,440 | 55.3 | +16.8 |
| Conservative | Timothy Wood | 16,858 | 32.8 | −11.1 |
| Liberal Democrats | Alexander Wilcock | 4,588 | 8.9 | −8.2 |
| Referendum | Jeffery Coburn | 1,194 | 2.3 | New |
| ProLife Alliance | David Bundy | 196 | 0.4 | New |
| Natural Law | Andrew Calcraft | 110 | 0.2 | −0.2 |
| Majority | | 11,582 | 22.5 | N/A |
| Turnout | | 51,386 | 76.6 | –5.0 |
| Registered electors | | 66,889 | | |
| Labour gain from Conservative | | Swing | +13.9 | |

1992 notional result
| Party | Vote | % |
|---|---|---|
| Conservative | 24,078 | 43.9 |
| Labour | 21,159 | 38.6 |
| Liberal Democrats | 9,379 | 17.1 |
| Others | 220 | 0.4 |
| Turnout | 54,836 | 81.8 |
| Electorate | 67,015 | |

General election 1992: Stevenage
| Party | Candidate | Votes | % | ±% |
|---|---|---|---|---|
| Conservative | Timothy Wood | 26,652 | 45.7 | +3.6 |
| Labour | Judith Church | 21,764 | 37.3 | +11.9 |
| Liberal Democrats | Andrew Reilly | 9,668 | 16.6 | −15.9 |
| Natural Law | Andrew Calcraft | 233 | 0.4 | New |
| Majority | | 4,888 | 8.4 | −1.2 |
| Turnout | | 58,317 | 83.0 | +2.5 |
| Registered electors | | 70,233 | | |
| Conservative hold | | Swing | −4.1 | |

=== Elections in the 1980s ===
General election 1987: Stevenage
| Party | Candidate | Votes | % | ±% |
|---|---|---|---|---|
| Conservative | Timothy Wood | 23,541 | 42.1 | +2.6 |
| SDP | Ben Stoneham | 18,201 | 32.5 | −3.6 |
| Labour | Malcolm Withers | 14,229 | 25.4 | +1.4 |
| Majority | | 5,340 | 9.5 | +6.2 |
| Turnout | | 55,971 | 80.5 | +2.6 |
| Registered electors | | 69,525 | | |
| Conservative hold | | Swing | +3.1 | |

General election 1983: Stevenage
| Party | Candidate | Votes | % | ±% |
|---|---|---|---|---|
| Conservative | Timothy Wood | 20,787 | 39.4 | –3.0 |
| SDP | Ben Stoneham | 19,032 | 36.1 | +23.9 |
| Labour | Susan Reeves | 12,673 | 24.0 | –20.3 |
| BNP | David Bowmaker | 236 | 0.5 | New |
| Majority | | 1,755 | 3.3 | N/A |
| Turnout | | 52,728 | 77.9 | |
| Registered electors | | 67,706 | | |
| Conservative gain from Labour | | Swing | +8.7 | |

1979 notional result
| Party | Vote | % |
|---|---|---|
| Labour | 22,574 | 44.3 |
| Conservative | 21,586 | 42.4 |
| Liberal | 6,228 | 12.2 |
| Others | 531 | 1.0 |
| Turnout | 50,919 | |
| Electorate | | |

== See also ==
- List of parliamentary constituencies in Hertfordshire
- List of parliamentary constituencies in the East of England (region)
