= List of University of Sussex alumni =

This is a list of notable alumni of the University of Sussex.

== Politicians ==
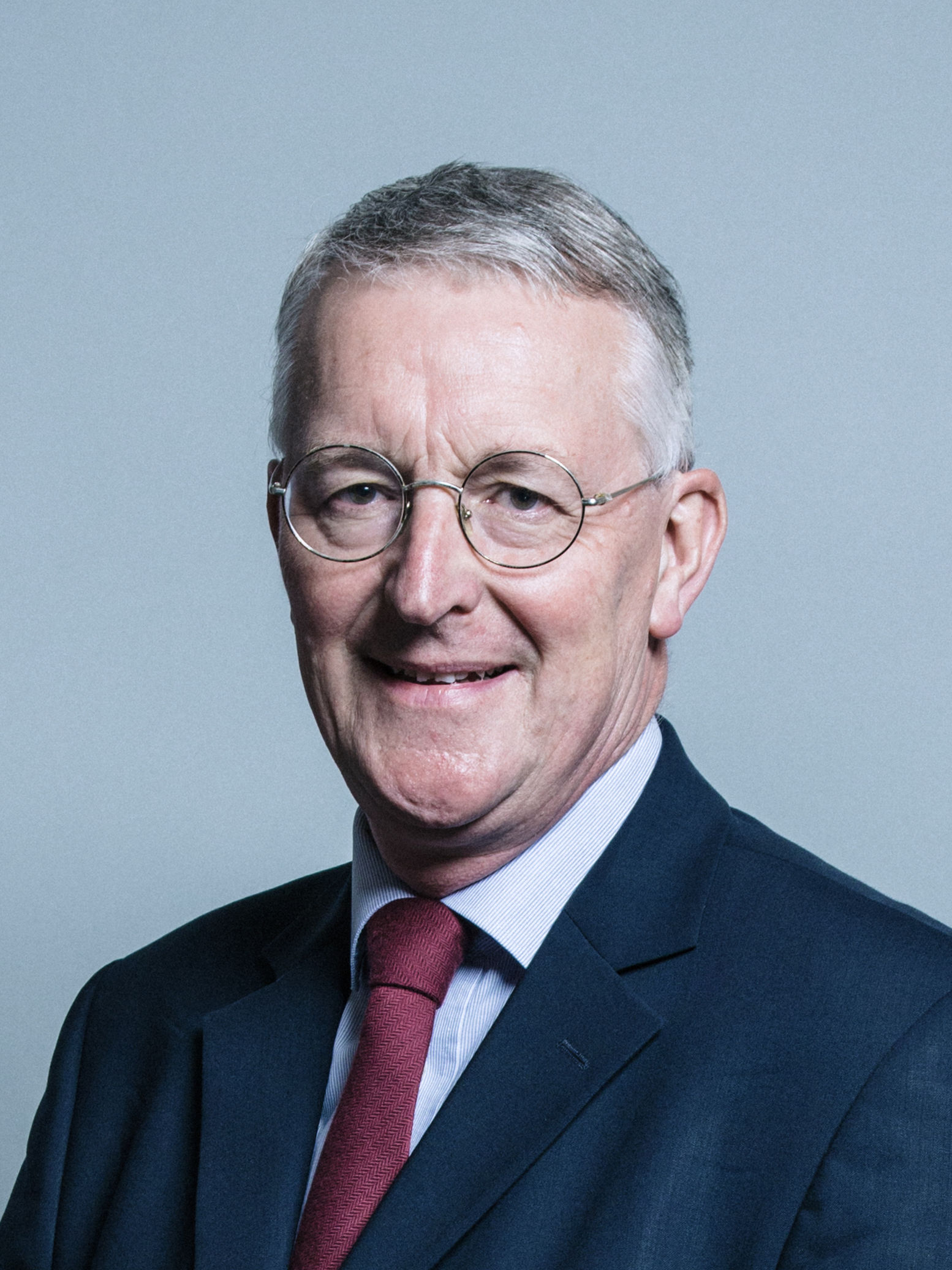
Hilary Benn, Labour Party Member of Parliament

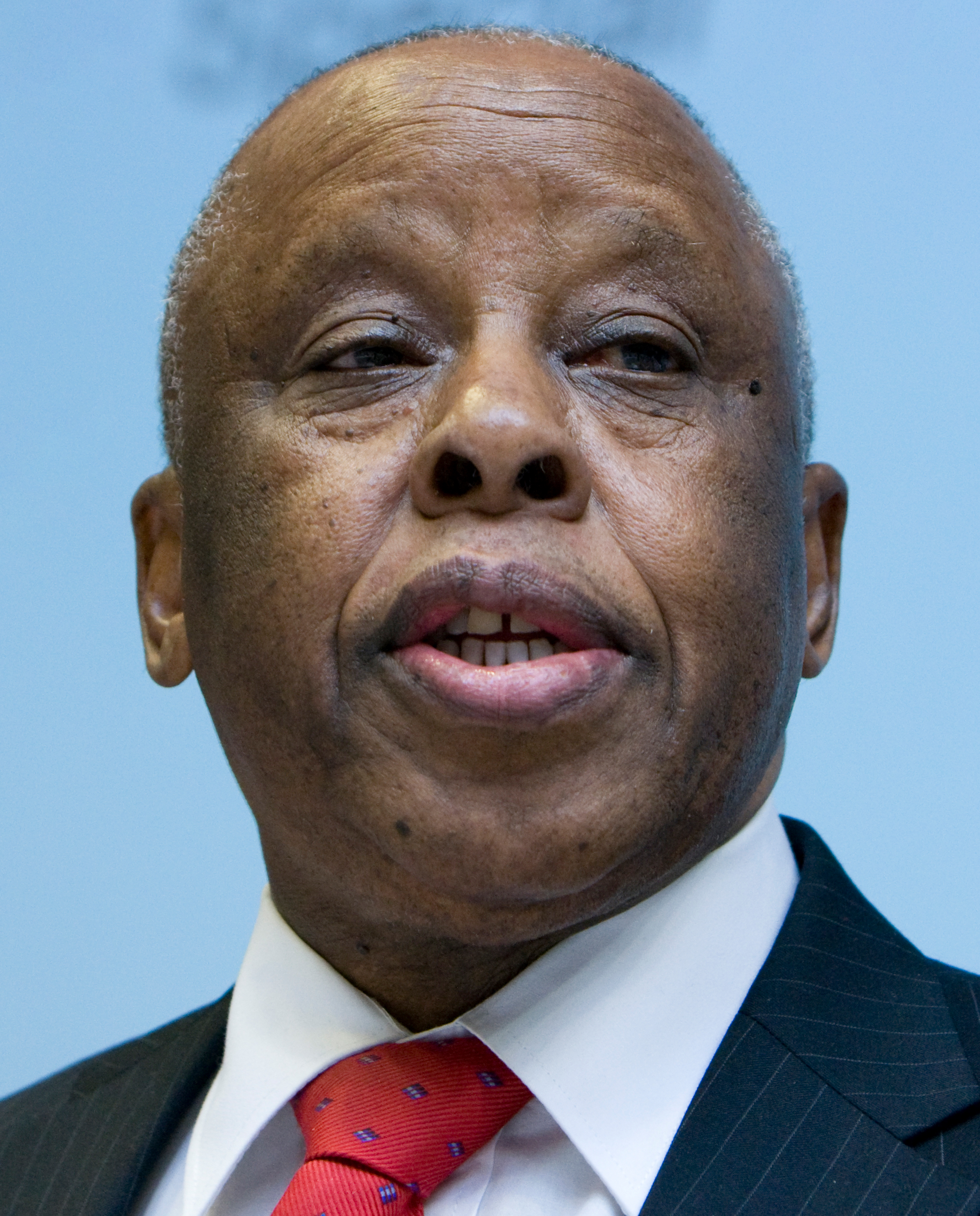
Festus Mogae, President of Botswana

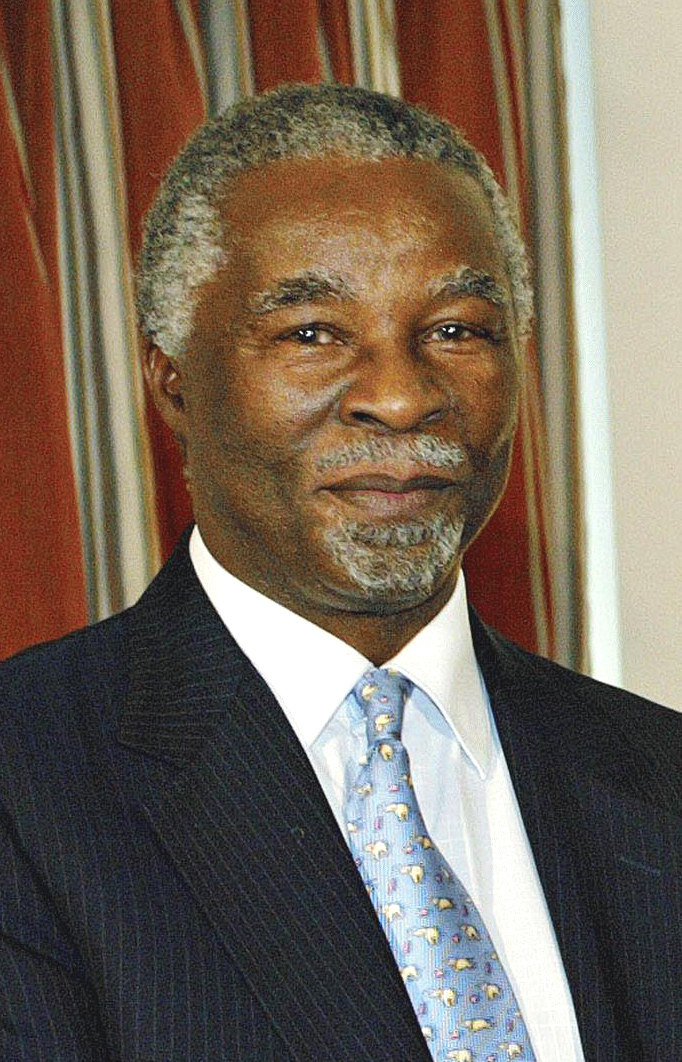
Thabo Mbeki, President of South Africa

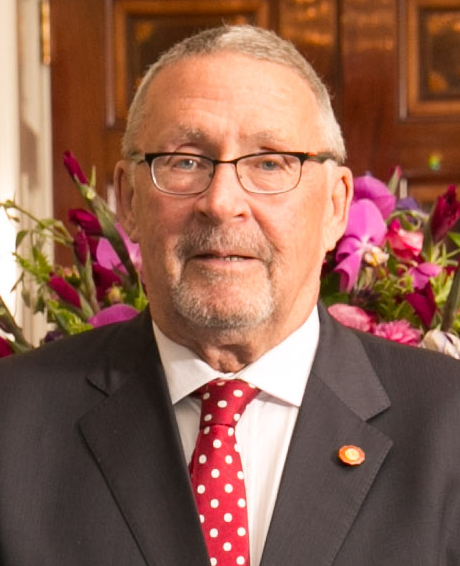
Guy Scott, President of Zambia

- Peter Kyle, British Labour Politician, member of British Parliament and former government Minister
- Kemi Badenoch, Conservative Member of Parliament for Saffron Walden and Leader of the Conservative party
- Marina Baker, Liberal Democrat politician in Lewes
- Enele Sopoaga, former Prime Minister of Tuvalu
- Tony Baldry, former Conservative Member of Parliament for Banbury
- Hilary Benn, Labour Member of Parliament for Leeds Central, former Secretary of State for the Environment, Food and Rural Affairs
- Lloyd Russell-Moyle, British Green Party politician and former Member of British Parliament
- Ben Bradshaw, former Labour Member of Parliament for Exeter, former Secretary of State for Culture, Media and Sport
- Isatou Touray, Vice-president of The Republic of The Gambia
- Carlos Alvarado Quesada, President of Costa Rica
- Simon Busuttil, Maltese Member of the European Parliament
- David Lee Camp, U.S. member of the House of Representatives
- Bernard Coard, minister and deputy prime minister of Grenada
- Indrajit Coomaraswamy, Governor of the Central Bank of Sri Lanka
- Rob Davies, minister of the Department of Trade and Industry of South Africa
- Bogolo Kenewendo, Economist and youngest-ever government minister of Botswana
- Michael Fabricant, former Conservative Member of Parliament for Lichfield
- Andrew George, Liberal Democrat MP for St Ives
- Philip Gould, Lord Gould, Life peer and adviser to the Labour Party
- Peter Hain, former Labour Member of Parliament for Neath and Secretary of State for Wales
- Sir Jonathan Faull, former British official in the European commission and current chair of European Public Affairs at Brunswick and Professor at King's College London
- David Hallam, former Labour Member of the European Parliament, author
- Musa Hitam, former deputy prime minister of Malaysia
- David Lepper, former Labour Member of Parliament for Brighton Pavilion
- Thabo Mbeki, former President of South Africa
- James McMurdock, Reform UK Member of Parliament for South Basildon and East Thurrock
- Festus Mogae, President of Botswana
- Caroline Nokes, Conservative Member of Parliament for Romsey and Southampton North and Deputy Speaker of the House of Commons
- Dan Norris, former Labour Member of Parliament for Wansdyke (1997–2010), Mayor of the West of England (2021–present), and Labour Member of Parliament for North East Somerset and Hanham (2024–present)
- Sherry Rehman, Senator, Pakistan (2015–present)
- Matt Rodda, Labour Member of Parliament for Reading East (2017–2024) and Reading Central (2024–present)
- George Saitoti, Kenyan politician
- Martin Salter, former Labour Member of Parliament for Reading West
- Tunku Puteri Intan Safinaz, Tunku Temenggong of Kedah
- Guy Scott, President of Zambia
- Kamil Šaško, Health Minister of Slovakia
- Mateusz Szczurek, Finance Minister of Poland
- Euclid Tsakalotos, Greek finance minister, (2015–present)
- Geoffrey Van Orden, Conservative MEP for East of England 1999–2019, formerly Brigadier, British Army
- Ruwan Wijewardene, Sri Lankan politician and Member of Parliament
- Alan Woods, Trotskyist activist
- Mohammad Shtayyeh, Prime Minister of the State of Palestine
- Dame Froyla Tzalam, Governor-General of Belize (2021–present)

== Scientists ==
- Adrian Bird, Director of Wellcome Trust Centre for Cell Biology, University of Edinburgh
- Brenda Boardman, policy development related to fuel poverty
- Amir Caldeira, Brazilian quantum physicist
- David Clary, President, Magdalen College, Oxford
- Dave Cliff, computer scientist
- Peter Coles, astrophysicist
- Ian H. S. Cullimore, computer scientist
- Anthony R. Dickinson, neuroscientist
- Lesley Fallowfield, cancer psychologist
- Philip Ingham, developmental biologist
- Francesca M. Kerton, chemistry professor
- Adam Kilgarriff, corpus linguist, lexicographer and the co-author of the Sketch Engine corpus management system
- Sir Peter Knight, Principal of the Faculty of Natural Sciences Imperial College London
- Georgina Mace, Director, NERC Centre for Population Biology, Imperial College London
- Elizabeth F. Churchill, Director of User experience at Google and Vice President-elect of the Association for Computing Machinery
- Dimitri Nanopoulos, quantum physicist
- Becky Parker, physicist and physics teacher
- Armando J. L. Pombeiro, Portuguese chemical engineer
- Rohan Pethiyagoda, taxonomist
- Anil Seth, neuroscientist
- Nalin de Silva, theoretical physicist, philosopher, professor
- Mark Steedman, cognitive scientist
- Tim Sumner, experimental physicist
- Benjamin J Whitaker, chemist

== Academics ==
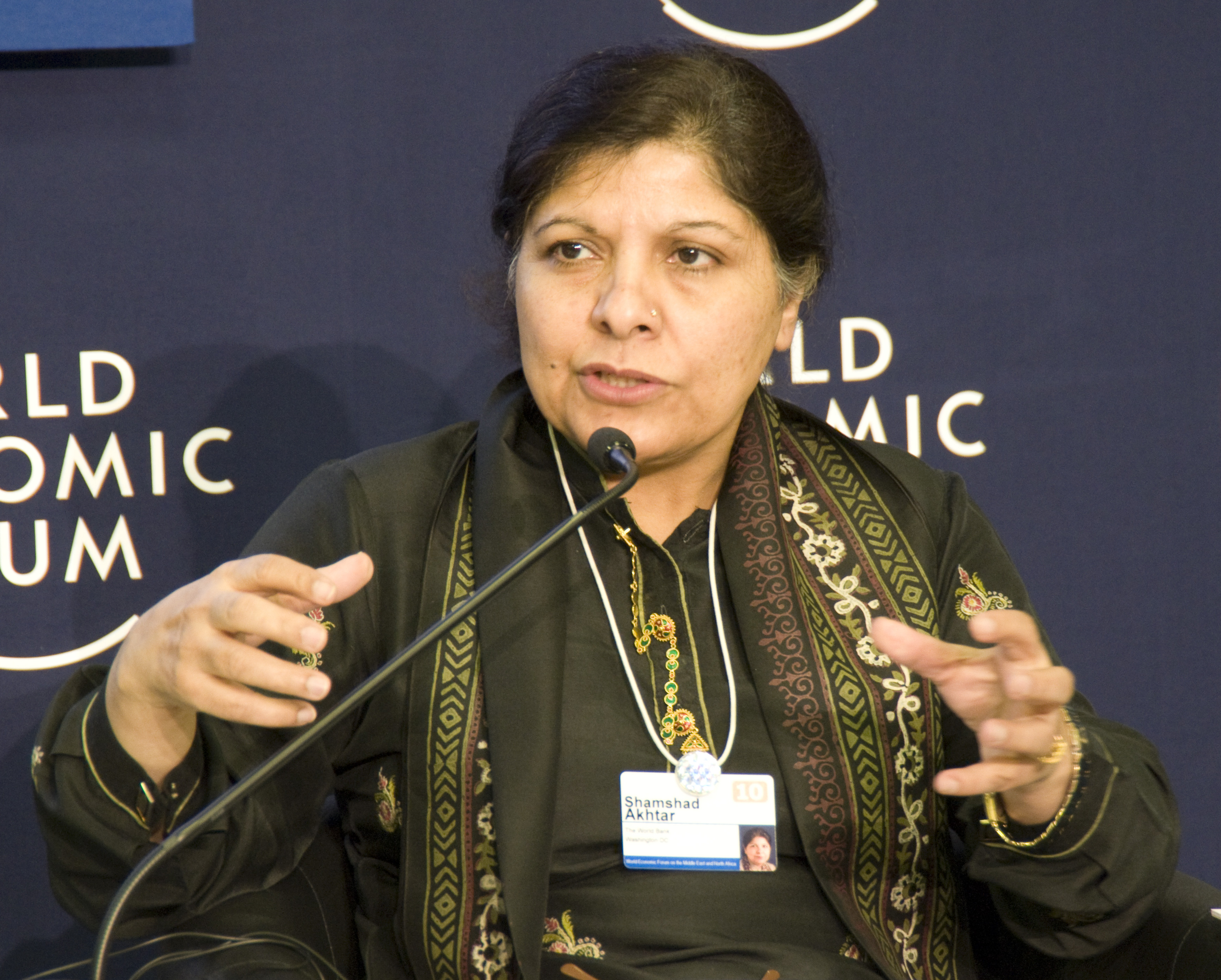
Shamshad Akhtar, Executive Secretary of United Nations Economic and Social Commission

- Abdalla Uba Adamu, professor, media scholar
- Daniele Archibugi, economic and political theorist
- Shamshad Akhtar, development economist, diplomat, former governor of State Bank of Pakistan
- Maria Balshaw, director of the Whitworth Art Gallery, Manchester and Manchester Art Gallery
- Alan Carter, philosopher
- Cheung Kam Ching, philosopher
- Norman Davies, historian
- Kay Firth-Butterfield, professor and author
- Gabriella Gibson, British medical entomologist and professor
- Paul Gilroy, professor and cultural critic
- A. C. Grayling, philosopher
- Pierre Hauck, professor
- Paul Hirst, professor
- Mary James, educator
- Calestous Juma, professor
- Reetika Khera, economics professor
- Robert Hugh Layton, Emeritus Professor at Durham University
- István Mészáros, professor
- Jeremy Morris, professor
- Paul Morris, educationalist
- Timothy O'Shea, vice-chancellor of the University of Edinburgh
- Nick Rees-Roberts, professor
- Reza Shah-Kazemi, author
- Guy Standing, development economist
- Tim Sumner, professor
- Lucy Worsley, historian and curator
- Ayman Zohry, expert on migration studies

== Writers and broadcasters ==
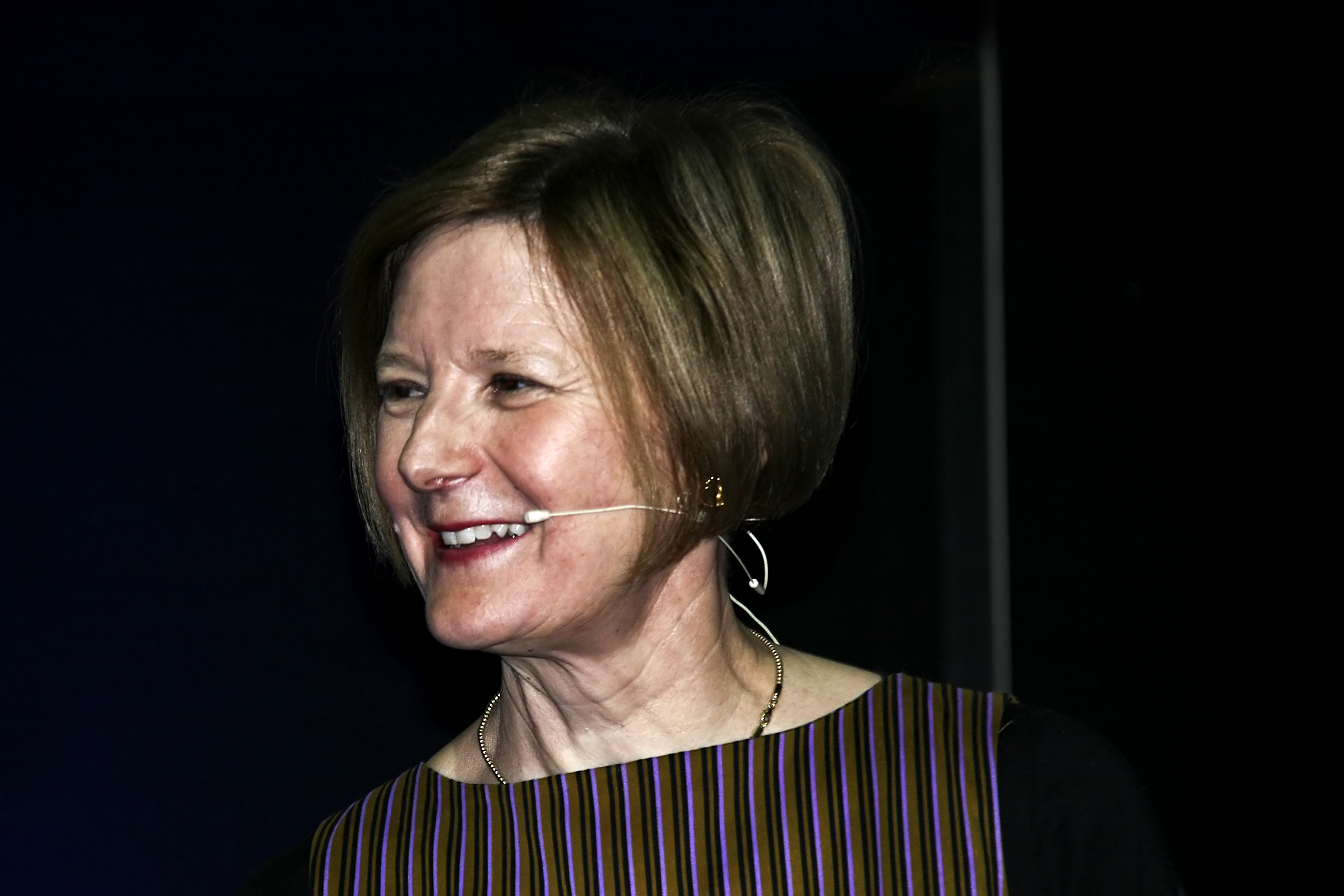
Helen Boaden, former BBC director

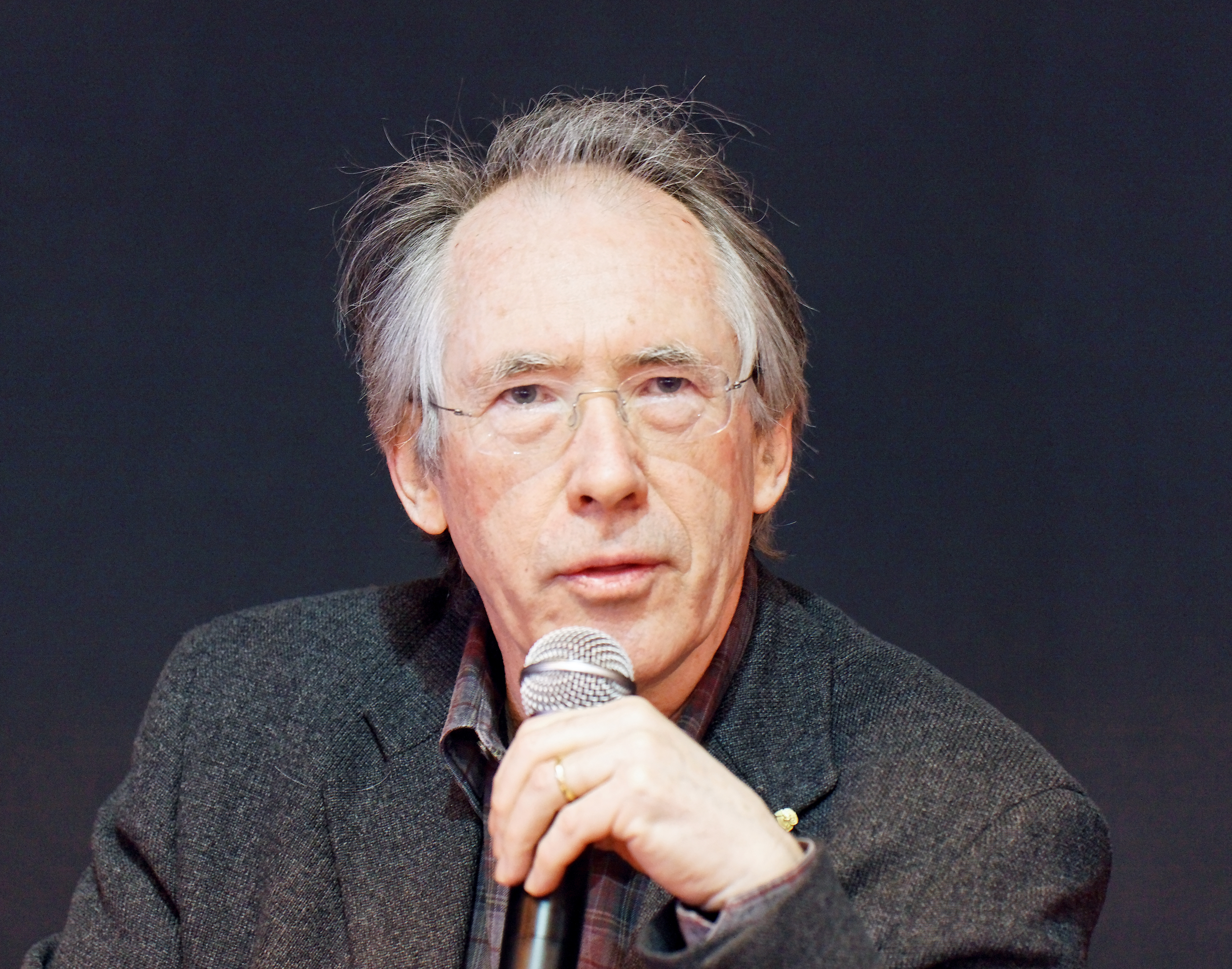
Ian McEwan, novelist and screenwriter

- Patrick Allen, award-winning author and teacher
- Becky Anderson, CNN International correspondent and presenter
- Desi Anwar, journalist, news presenter
- David Baboulene, travel writer and story theorist
- Mark Barrowcliffe, novelist
- Helen Boaden, former director of BBC Radio
- Tommy Boyd, broadcaster
- Edward Kamau Brathwaite, author
- Estelle Akofio-Sowah, businesswoman and Google country manager
- Shantanu Gupta, author and political analyst
- Peter Brimelow, journalist and author
- Emily Buchanan, BBC World Affairs correspondent
- Michael Buerk, BBC journalist and newsreader
- Richard Calder, novelist
- Duncan Campbell, investigative journalist, consultant, producer and forensic expert
- Lord Richard Cecil, journalist and adventurer (died 1978)
- Paul Evans, poet
- Simon Fanshawe, writer, broadcaster
- Darius Fisher, producer, director
- Connie Glynn, writer and YouTuber
- Philippa Gregory, novelist
- Charlotte Greig, novelist and musician
- Claudia Hammond, writer, broadcaster
- Patrick Hicks, novelist and poet
- Tobias Hill, novelist and poet
- Alan Jenkins, poet
- Gabriel Josipovici, renowned contemporary British author
- Merfyn Jones professor, historian, broadcaster; governor of the BBC; vice-chancellor of the University of Wales, Bangor
- Robin Lustig, broadcaster
- Marina Mahathir, leader in many non-governmental organizations
- Sarra Manning, writer
- Howard Marks, Welsh author, former teacher and drug smuggler
- Ian McEwan, novelist
- Andrew Morton, journalist and writer
- Dermot Murnaghan, television presenter and journalist
- Clive Myrie, BBC News presenter and journalist
- Kim Newman, journalist and writer
- Chris Paling, novelist
- Ashley Pharoah, television writer
- Nigel Planer, actor, novelist, playwright
- Heydon Prowse, BAFTA award winner BBC journalist, activist, satirist and director
- Kavita Reddi, Indian journalist, entrepreneur, and education advocate
- Jolyon Rubinstein, BAFTA award winner actor, writer, producer and director
- Chris Ship, Deputy Political Editor of ITV News
- Alexandra Shulman, editor of Vogue
- Julia Somerville, broadcaster
- Zoe Strimpel, journalist, writer, historian
- Steve Coll, author and 1990 Pulitzer prize winner
- Shirley Thomas, professor, broadcaster
- Srđa Trifković, historian and journalist
- Janice Turner, writer for The Times
- Kabura Zakama, Nigerian poet

== Musicians and entertainers ==
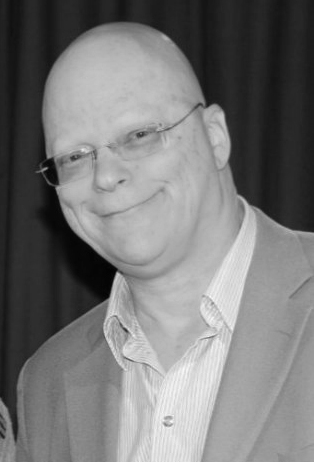
John Altman, film composer

- John Altman, award-winning film composer, music arranger, orchestrator, and conductor
- Tony Banks, keyboard player with Genesis
- Beardyman, beatboxer
- Frankie Boyle, comedian
- Daniel Catán, composer
- Graham Clark, jazz/rock violinist ex-Gong
- Mo Foster, session musician (bass guitar)
- Mark Hollis, lead singer of Talk Talk
- Marcus Hamblett, composer and musician
- Billy Idol, musician
- Jem, singer-songwriter
- Steve Knightley, singer-songwriter
- Cariad Lloyd, comedian and actress
- Ophelia Lovibond, actress
- Mura Masa, electronic music producer and multi-instrumentalist, studied English Literature
- Bob Mortimer, comedian
- Sara Pascoe, stand-up comedian and author
- Grant Serpell, former drummer with Sailor and Affinity
- Cristian Vogel, electronic musician
- Jessie Ware, singer-songwriter
- Josephine Wiggs, bassist with The Breeders

== Diplomats ==
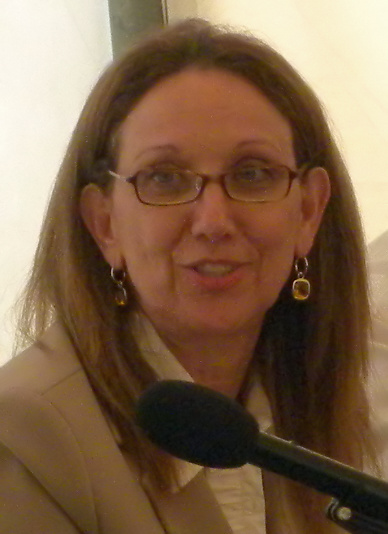
Rebeca Grynspan, Head of United Nations Development Programme

- Rebeca Grynspan, former UN Under-Secretary-General and UN UNDP head and former vice president of Costa Rica
- Renée Jones-Bos, Dutch diplomat and ambassador to the United States
- Jamie Shea, Spokesman and Deputy Assistant Secretary General for External Relations of NATO
- Savenaca Siwatibau, Fijian academic leader, civil service administrator
- Roberto Valent, United Nations diplomat
- Jesoni Vitusagavulu, Fijian diplomat and ambassador to the United States
- Jawhar Sircar, Indian public administrator and former CEO of Prasar Bharati

== Sports ==
- Rosalie Birch, England Test cricketer, part of Ashes winning team 2005
- Brendan Foster, former distance runner, founder of the Great North Run, and currently a BBC athletics commentator
- Jayanthi Kuru-Utumpala, mountaineer and first Sri Lankan and fourth women in the world to reach the peak of Mount Everest
- Ibrahim “Ibz” Khan, bodybuilder and silver medalist in weightlifting at Junior Olympics
- Ralf Rangnick, Former Interim Manager of Manchester United F.C., Head Coach of the Austria national football team
- Virginia Wade, Wimbledon Ladies' Singles Champion, 1977

== Business ==
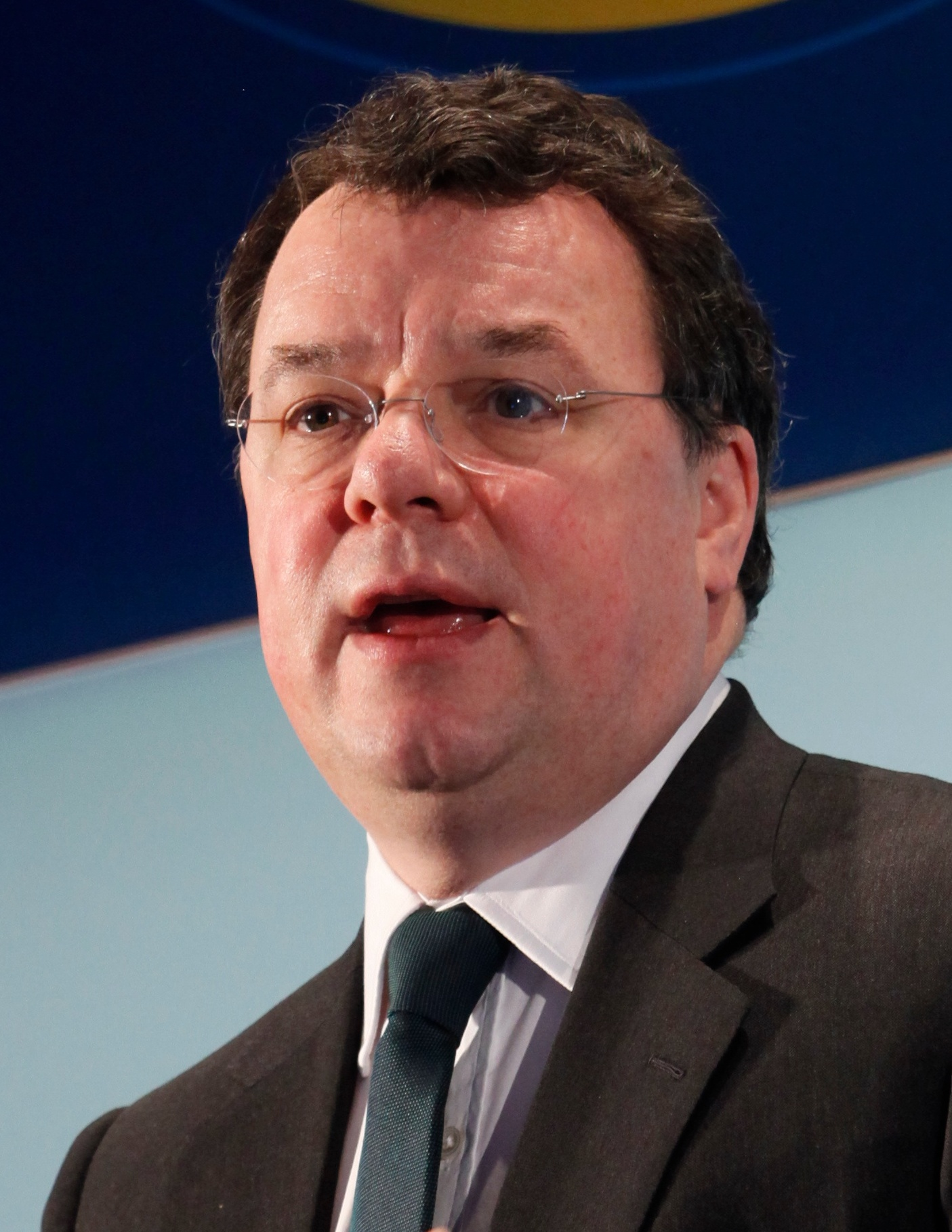
Keith Skeoch, CEO of Standard Life

- Jeremy Coller, CEO of Coller Capital, a British private equity firm
- Liam Hackett, activist, founder and CEO Ditch the Label
- Maikanti Baru, engineer, former chief, Nigeria's state oil firm; Nigerian National Petroleum Corporation
- Harriet Lamb, CEO of International Alert
- Nancy Okail, Executive Director, Tahrir Institute for Middle East Policy; expert on human rights
- Raj Rajaratnam, hedge fund CEO, Galleon Group; convicted of insider trading
- Simon Segars, CEO of ARM Holdings plc, electronic engineer
- Sir Keith Skeoch, chief executive (CEO) of Standard Life
- Noel Tata, industrialist
- Zhang Xin, entrepreneur and CEO of SOHO China

== Others ==
- Michael Attenborough, director
- Linda Bellos, adviser
- Christina Beardsley, priest and advocate for transgender inclusion in the Church of England
- Helen Cammock, artist
- Jeremy Deller, artist
- Michael Fuller, Chief Constable of Kent Police
- Bruno Heller, screenwriter and actor
- Fatou Jeng, Gambian climate activist
- Naomie Kremer, artist
- Claire Oboussier, artist
- Micheál OʼConnell / Mocksim, artist
- David Pecaut, American-born Canadian civic activist and consultant
- Muhammad Abdur Rahman, Pakistani Judge
- Abhay Xaxa (1983–2020), Indian scholar and human rights activist
