= Kavita =

- Gender: Female
- Language: Hindi; Sanskrit

Origin
- Meaning: "poetry" "poem"
- Region of origin: India; Malaysia

Other names
- Related names: Kavitha

Kavita (Hindi: कविता) is a feminine given name.

== Notable people named Kavita ==
- Kavita K. Barjatya (born 1977), Indian producer
- Kavita Channe (born 1980), American sports announcer
- Kavita Chaudhary (1956–2024), Indian actress
- Kavita Daswani (born 1964), American-Indian writer
- Kavita Goyat (born 1988), Indian boxer
- Kavita Jain (born 1972), Indian politician
- Kavita Kapoor, Indian actress
- Kavita Kaushik (born 1981), Indian actress
- Kavita Krishnamurthy (born 1958), Indian playback singer
- Kavita Lad (born 1968), Indian actress
- Kavita Radheshyam (born 1985), Indian actress
- Kavita Ramdas (born 1962), Indian Executive Director
- Kavita Raut (born 1985), Indian long-distance runner
- Kavita Reddi, Indian journalist, entrepreneur, and education advocate
- Kavita Roy (born 1980), Indian cricketer
- Kavita Srinivasan, Indian actress
- Kavita Seth (born 1970), Indian singer
- Kavita Sidhu (born 1971), Malaysian actress and former beauty queen
- Kavitha Lankesh (born 1974), Indian director, screenwriter and lyricist
- Kavita Oberoi (born 1970), British entrepreneur
- Kavita Puri, British journalist, radio broadcaster and author

== Fictional characters ==
- Kavita Rao, from Marvel Comics universe of the X-Men.

== Others ==
- Kavita poetry magazine, Bengali poetry magazine.
