= Tim Sumner =

Tim Sumner may refer to:

- Tim Sumner (physicist), Professor of Experimental Physics at Imperial College London
- Tim Sumner (footballer) (born 1994), Australian rules footballer
