= Patiala salwar =

Type of salwar (trouser)

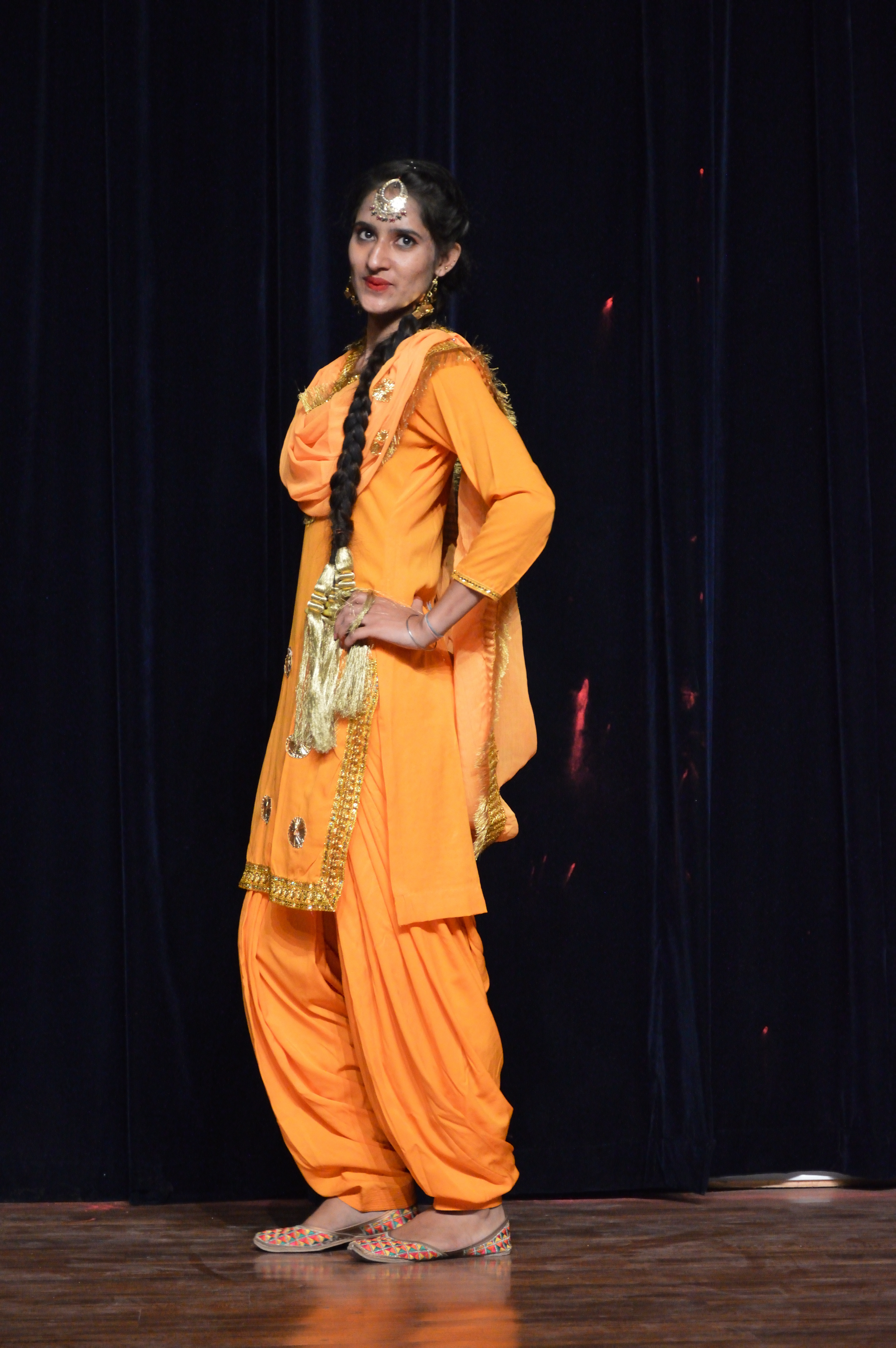
Patiala salwar

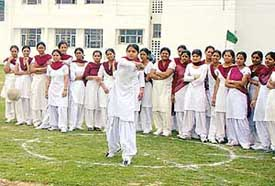
School girls wearing Patiala salwars

A Patiala salwar (also called a pattian walee salwar) (also pronounced as shalwar in Urdu) is a type of female trousers which has its roots in Patiala City in the Northern region of Punjab state in India. The King of Patiala in earlier times wore a Patiala salwar as his royal suit. The Patiala Salwar has a close resemblance to the Pathani suit, which has loose layers similar to those of a salwar, and a long, knee-length top known as a kameez. The garment is no longer customarily worn by men, but has classically transformed itself with new cuts and styling into a women's garment.

The Patiala trousers are preferred by most of the women of Punjab for comfort and durability in summers. Since the Patiala salwar is very loose and stitched with pleats it is a very comfortable outfit to wear. Its distinguishing characteristic is folds of cloth stitched together that meet at the bottom. Patiala salwars require double the length of material to get stitched, which is generally four meters in length. The fall of the pleats of the Patiala salwar is such that it gives a beautiful draping effect. The pleats are stitched on the top to a belt.

A Patiala salwar with many pleats is also referred to as a Patiala shahi salwar since it was worn by the shahi (royal) people of Patiala. The Patiala salwar is worn as an alternative to the traditional Punjabi Salwar Suit.

== Tops ==
A Patiala salwar can be worn with different types of short and long shirts (kameez). Nowadays some girls even wear a T-shirt to give a mixed Asian and Western look. The most popular and traditional top used is a short kameez.

== In popular culture ==
In Bunty Aur Babli (2005), a new look to Patiala salwars and kurtis was worn by the film's star, Rani Mukherjee, designed by Aki Narula.

Actress Kareena Kapoor was also responsible for a new look in the film Jab We Met, wearing a Patiala shalwar and a short shirt. Other celebrities who have worn Patiala shalwars include Sonakshi Sinha, Amrita Rao, Sonam Kapoor, Preity Zinta.

== See also ==
- Salwar
