= Kurbaan (2009 film) =

2009 Indian film by Rensil D'Silva

- Theatrical release poster
- Directed by: Rensil D'Silva
- Screenplay by: Rensil D'Silva
- Dialogues by: Niranjan Iyengar; Anurag Kashyap
- Story by: Karan Johar
- Produced by: Hiroo Yash Johar; Karan Johar
- Starring: Saif Ali Khan; Kareena Kapoor; Vivek Oberoi; Kirron Kher; Om Puri; Dia Mirza
- Cinematography: Hemant Chaturvedi
- Edited by: Asif Ali Shaikh
- Music by: Salim–Sulaiman
- Production company: Dharma Productions
- Distributed by: UTV Motion Pictures
- Release date: 20 November 2009
- Running time: 160 minutes
- Country: India
- Language: Hindi
- Budget: ₹500 million (US$5.2 million)
- Box office: ₹429 million (US$4.5 million)

Kurbaan (transl. Sacrificed) is a 2009 Indian Hindi-language romantic thriller film directed by Rensil D'Silva and produced by Karan Johar under Dharma Productions. It is based on a story by Johar, who co-wrote the screenplay with D'Silva. Starring Saif Ali Khan and Kareena Kapoor, the story revolves around Avantika Ahuja (Kapoor), a psychology professor in New York who returns to Delhi, India, to caretake her ailing father and develops a relationship with Ehsaan (Khan). Avantika and Ehsaan fall in love, get married, and leave for the United States, where she discovers that Ehsaan and his family are linked to Islamic terrorist groups after witnessing the house arrest, domestic abuse, and murder of now family member Salma (Nauheed Cyrusi). The film's backdrop on global terrorism forms the crux.

The original story was conceptualized by Johar, who wanted D'Silva to direct it. In his directorial debut, D'Silva framed the script through the lens of the female protagonist, the romance between Kapoor and Khan, the thriller element, and a social message. The film was shot across Philadelphia, Brooklyn, New York City, Delhi and Mumbai between January 2009 to June 2009. The background score and soundtrack album are composed by the duo Salim–Sulaiman. The song sequences were choreographed by Vaibhavi Merchant. Anurag Kashyap and lyricist Niranjan Iyengar have penned the dialogues.

Kurbaan was released on 20 November 2009 and received positive reviews from critics, with praise for its direction, screenplay, soundtrack, and performances of the cast, with particular praise directed towards Kapoor's performance. However, despite critical acclaim, it was declared a flop by Box Office India.

At the 55th Filmfare Awards, Kurbaan received 2 nominations – Best Actress (Kapoor) and Best Male Playback Singer (Sonu Nigam & Salim Merchant for "Shukran Allah").

== Plot ==
Avantika Ahuja, a psychology professor living in the United States, returns to Delhi after her father falls ill. There, she meets Ehsaan Khan, a university professor from Mumbai. The two become friends and eventually fall in love. When Avantika is invited to return to the United States for work, Ehsaan agrees to accompany her. They marry and settle in America, where Avantika helps Ehsaan secure a position as a professor of "Islam and the Modern World" at her university. The couple lives in a quiet suburb with a large South Asian community.

Avantika befriends her neighbour Salma, who is being confined to her home by her husband, Hakil. Salma manages to inform Avantika of her situation and asks her to contact Rehana, a friend and television reporter. Avantika meets Rehana and her boyfriend Riyaz, a Muslim American journalist who has recently returned from Iraq. They conclude that Salma is likely a victim of domestic violence. Rehana plans to meet Salma but is unable to do so after being assigned to Iraq as part of a United Nations envoy.

After discovering that she is pregnant, Avantika overhears a group of men from the neighbourhood, led by the elder Bhaijaan, planning to bomb a plane carrying diplomats and members of the media, including Rehana. She realises that the men are members of a terrorist organisation and discovers Salma's body. The men pursue Avantika to her home, where she is reunited with Ehsaan. He initially comforts her before revealing that he is also a member of the organisation. Avantika learns that Ehsaan married her partly to obtain legal residency in the United States.

Bhaijaan orders Ehsaan to kill Avantika after she discovers the group's activities. However, upon learning of her pregnancy, Ehsaan refuses. He instead holds her captive and threatens to harm her father in India if she reveals what she knows. Avantika manages to telephone Rehana and leaves a warning on her voicemail, but Rehana has already boarded the targeted plane. The bomb detonates, killing Rehana and the other passengers.

Riyaz discovers Avantika's message and begins investigating the bombing. He goes undercover by attending Ehsaan's lectures and befriending him. Meanwhile, Avantika and the other wives of the organisation's members are kept under the supervision of Aapa, Bhaijaan's wife. Aapa explains the group's interpretation of jihad and reveals that Ehsaan was originally an Afghan man without a political ideology until his first wife and son were killed in an American bombing.

While attempting to dispose of Salma's body, Hakil and Ehsaan attract the attention of the police. Ehsaan kills Hakil and the officers before setting their vehicle on fire. Salma's partially burned body is subsequently discovered, prompting the FBI to distribute photographs of her in an attempt to identify her.

Ehsaan considers Riyaz a suitable replacement for Hakil and introduces him to Bhaijaan. Suspicious of Riyaz, Bhaijaan tests his loyalty by ordering him to shoot a man working at a fast-food counter. Riyaz appears to comply, but the gun is unloaded. Having passed the test, Riyaz is recruited for the organisation's next operation, which involves bombing several subway stations in New York City.

Riyaz and Avantika secretly cooperate to thwart the operation and expose the organisation. Riyaz arranges to meet with the FBI, but the plan is disrupted when one of the group's members recognises Salma's photograph. Bhaijaan consequently moves the bombing operation forward.

The group proceeds with the attack, with the women travelling together under Aapa's supervision while the men carry bombs intended for separate subway stations. During the operation, Riyaz's colleague accidentally exposes his true identity to Ehsaan and Bhaijaan. Riyaz attempts to escape and shoots Bhaijaan. Before dying, Bhaijaan reveals that three additional bombs have been placed in the women's bags without their knowledge. One of the bombs is being carried by Avantika.

Realising that Avantika and their unborn child are in danger, Ehsaan allows Riyaz to escape and searches for Avantika. Riyaz alerts the FBI, which dispatches teams to the targeted stations. The explosives carried by the women are safely recovered, while one of the male bombers detonates his explosives. Another bomber is apprehended before detonating his device but dies after swallowing a concealed cyanide capsule.

Ehsaan kills Aapa to free Avantika and admits that he loves her, asking her to care for their child. He successfully disarms the final bomb but is fatally wounded while fleeing from pursuing police officers. Before leaving, Avantika asks whether Ehsaan was his real name. He reveals that his real name is Khalid. As Avantika leaves the train, she hears a gunshot, implying that Khalid has taken his own life.

== Cast ==
The cast has been listed below:

- Saif Ali Khan as Ehsaan Khan / Khalid Anwar
- Kareena Kapoor as Avantika Ahuja
- Vivek Oberoi as Riyaz Masood
- Kirron Kher as Nasreen Aapa
- Dia Mirza as Rehana
- Om Puri as Bhaijaan
- Nauheed Cyrusi as Salma
- Rupinder Nagra as Hamid
- Faezeh Jalali as Anjum
- Kavita Srinivasan as Syeda
- Taher Shabbir as Tahir
- Akash Khurana as Avantika's father
- Kulbhushan Kharbanda as Riyaz's father
- Parineeta Borthakur as Professor Vaishali
- Shishir Sharma as Professor Qureshi
- Asheesh Kapur as Hakil
- Areesz Ganddi as Aslam

== Production ==
=== Development ===
In February 2008, Khan and Kapoor were confirmed as leads for the film. Kapoor called her role challenging and hinted of John Abraham featuring in the film. In December 2008, UTV Motion Pictures acquired the distribution rights of the film. In an interview with Rediff, D'Silva agreed that its Karan Johar's story. Johar told him about the film and for the next few months, D'Silva couldn't get it off his head. D'Silva learnt from a common friend that Karan loved the story, so he asked D'Silva to direct it. D' Silva went on to add that the film is a very intricate story from India to the US, pondering into state of Islam in the modern world. He acknowledged it as a woman's story, where Avantika Ahuja (Kapoor) plays a psychology lecturer living in New York. She comes to India to take care of her ailing father and joins Delhi University. She meets Ehsaan Khan (Khan), they fall in love, marry and go back to the US. Post the movement, things with them turn topsy-turvy. D'Silva cleared that the film was not based on 9/11 attacks.

When Johar was quizzed on the film script bearing resemblance to Arlington Road (1999), he stated it does have theme of terrorism. As per D'Silva, the film story has three elements - the romance between Khan and Kapoor; the thriller element; and it also carries a social message. In January 2009, Anurag Kashyap stated the title of the film as Jihaad in an interview with The Telegraph. In an interview with Livemint, D'Silva was quoted saying: "The character played by Khan is an “urban, educated, liberal" Muslim, in love with a Hindu girl played by Kapoor." He noted a fair urban shift in the cinema on portraying Muslim characters. Adding further on Khan's character; which was not "the decadent, sozzled nawab cavorting with courtesans; not “Khan chacha", the benevolent other, or wearing a Faiz topi".

=== Casting ===
Shanoo Sharma was roped in as the casting director. Kher plays the role of an Afghan for the first time. She worked on her dialect and at times, arranged for her own clothes. She was clear about how she wanted to look and play the role. Before Oberoi was finalized, Akshaye Khanna and Irrfan Khan were considered. In an interview with The Telegraph, Aki Narula confirmed designing the costumes for the characters. Tara Sharma was approached for a role but rejected due to personal reasons. In an interview with Subhash K Jha, Oberoi was quoted saying: "When I read the script, my first question to Karan was, 'Why me?' He laughed and said it was because I was talented and I could pull it off. And I love working with Kareena. We share a great rapport after Yuva (2004) and Omkara (2006)." The casting was finalized by Karan Johar.

=== Costume design ===
Aki Narula discussed with D'Silva on the screenplay and locales to design the costumes. As he knew filming schedules in Delhi around October (winter season), he researched the different styles by going to the colleges, canteens, and the local markets. For Kapoor, he designed full sleeve t-shirts with V-necks and dark-colored ankle-length churidars with Jaipuri work, mojri and scarves. Her costumes featured rust, burgundy, olive green, blue and purple colors, as observed during the Delhi University scenes. Accessories worn were silver oxidized jewels. In the track "Shukran Allah", Kapoor's salwar was of 60 metres of fabric. As the plot progresses to the U.S., Narula kept the leads' outfits with the ideology that "when traveling abroad, you'd carry some clothes with you". He avoided designing or collaborating with U.S. brands to keep the transitions real. Additionally, Narula gave her Zara trench coats, jeans, and track pants, while sporting her sacred pendant. Towards the terror plot, she dons more of grey, blue, and blacks costumes.

Narula kept Khan's costumes simple with jeans and shirts in blue, grey, and green with V-neck sweaters apart from pathani kurtas with jeans. After moving to the U.S. too, his outfits introduced were long jackets in blue and grey. During the terror scenes, he was made to wear darker colors in leather. Johar, D'Silva, and Narula decided that a stubble or beard gives grittiness to the character. Hence, Khan is seen unshaven.

Puri was given suit vests to don throughout the film. Intentionally, all his pathani kurtas were washed by a dhobi to get the worn look, which he noticed. Kher received long tunic, long skirts, and shawls wrapped around her head to justify her as an Afghan. She was very involved with her outfits. She had her ideas that she shared with Narula and worked together on her looks. Oberoi was given a lot of dark jeans, t-shirts, sweaters, wind cheaters in navy blue, grey, olive green, and black leather jackets, all from Zara and H&M, while Mirza was given short skirts with jackets and work bags, in black formal work outfits.

=== Filming ===
Principal photography commenced in November 2008 in Philadelphia. A set was erected to shoot the replica of a terrorist attack. The subway tube scene was shot underground where the train was hired. Khan noted the cold weather conditions to an added difficulty in getting the pitch and tone right while delivering dialogues. The characters were shooting in sync sound. There were 80 people in the unit. Also during the shoot, Kapoor fainted on the sets owing to the cold weather. Some scenes were filmed in Brooklyn.

A three-minute erotic scene between Khan and Kapoor (through the song "Rasiya") was requested to be removed from the film print by Kapoor for personal reasons. She'd agreed to shoot for it because it was integral to the script. In an interview with Press Trust of India, she was quoted saying: "“I've done kissing scenes earlier, but the lovemaking scene is explicit by my yardstick.” Khan flew down to India for health reasons on 22 December 2008. D'Silva made an attempt to film in U.K. but cancelled due to lack of permissions and security issues. Filming took place in areas around Rajpath and Delhi Haat in February 2009.

The song "Shukran Allah" was shot close to Humayun's Tomb with 2 lakh people witnessing the shoot. However, owing to the lead pair's popularity, there were a huge number of people who had come to see them especially. The areas of Jama Masjid and Janpath were always too high to shoot. Hence, barring a few shots, wide-angle shoots were cancelled enforcing recreation of scenes planned in Delhi for Mumbai between mid-March to April 2009. The Mumbai scenes bore continuity to the ones filmed in U.S. In May 2009, filming continued in New York. Johar's production house was accused of not paying its employees on the film's sets in US.

In August 2009, the film was set to enter its last schedule in Pune. However, it was cancelled owing to the outbreak of swine flu. As per D'Silva, Oberoi's scenes formed about 80% of the film. His character was central to the drama. Oberoi used to visit D'Silva's room in Philadelphia every night to discuss diction, dialogues and looks. Oberoi also had the most single shots in the film. At times, the treatment of a few scenes were rewritten by Johar. Filming and post-production was wrapped up by November 2009.

== Soundtrack ==
The original score and soundtrack for the film were composed by Salim–Sulaiman with lyrics written by Niranjan Iyengar and Irfan Siddiqui. The album was released under the Sony Music India label on 12 October 2009.

== Release ==
=== Theatrical ===
Kurbaan's teaser trailer was released along with Wake Up Sid, which released on 2 October 2009.

=== Censorship ===
The Central Board of Film Certification India awarded the film with an A (Restricted to adults) release certificate. Vinayak Azaad (The Regional Officer of the Censor Board) noted the setting of the film, which is terrorism, led to the decision. Rensil D’Silva, the director of the film, tried convincing for a ‘U’ or ‘U/A’ certificate, however, there were no changes.

=== Satellite rights ===
Kurbaan first premiered on Colors, following which it subsequently began being broadcast on UTV Movies. A decade later, Star India acquired the rights, and retains them with several other films such as Wake Up Sid (2009).

=== Game ===
ASTPL, an Indian software developer, also released a mobile video game based on the film.

== Reception ==
=== Critical reception ===
Kurbaan received positive reviews from domestic and international critics.

In his review for Economic Times, Gaurav Malani wrote: "Kurbaan is an outcome of sensitive filmmaking, Technically, the film is proficient in all departments. Undoubtedly. the narrative bears a striking resemblance to Kabir Khan's New York (2009), both in terms of the theme and setting of the story and structure of the screenplay." He gave the film a score of 3 (out of 5). Critic Taran Adarsh in his review for Bollywood Hungama gave the film 4 (out of 5), noting "Kurbaan is embellished with superlative performances. Khan is extraordinary in a role that only proves his versatility once again. He claimed the film as "the most powerful film to come out of the Hindi film industry in 2009, so far. The film has a captivating plot, gripping screenplay, superb performances and a riveting climax." Rajeev Masand from CNN-IBN noted "It's a compelling thriller that doesn’t shy away from touching prickly issues, director Rensil D’Silva makes a confident debut with a film that is respectable and engaging." He assigned a score of 3 on 5. Shubhra Gupta of The Indian Express rated the film 3 out of 5, noted: "Written sharply by producer Karan Johar, and directed intelligently by first-timer Rensil D'Silva, the film enunciates, with admirable clarity, contemporary conundrums." A review by Anil Sinanan for Time Out denoted, "However, this has to be applauded for exploring a topical and sensitive subject in the widest commercial context. Interesting, entertaining and solidly executed." The score assigned by her to the film was 3 on 5. Nikhat Kazmi of The Times of India rated the film 3.5 on 5, adding on "Kudos to Karan Johar for shifting gears completely and entering into serious territory." Ram Tarat of Future Movies UK, pointed "A chilling yet appropriately tempered and charismatic antidote to your archetypal seasonal fare, Kurbaan is a gripping white knuckle ride that turns at all the right places for the ultimate thrill ride." He added on a score of 4 (out of 5). Baradwaj Rangan, his review for the film pointed: "It is yet another story about yet another terrorist. The hardware is there, but where’s the heart? Kurbaan wears its hot-button topicality proudly, like a gleaming medal that’s been well and truly earned. And the members of the cast do most of the earning, each one entrusted with disbursing a bit of the sugar-coated bitter medicine."

=== Box office ===
Kurbaan was released in 1250 screens across India. The first day box office collections were est. ₹40 million. Despite pre-release hype and controversy, it opened to average numbers. Also, the first day occupancy was 40%, below the expected average of 70%. The film's business in territories like Delhi, Lucknow, Bangalore and Hyderabad managed 50 to 60 per cent occupancy. However, the A (Restricted to Adult) certificate from the Censor Board limited the audiences. The film went on to earn est. ₹136 million in India in the first weekend of its release. The worldwide first weekend collection were around est. ₹242 million. However, the first week's collections improved meagre to est. ₹197 million in India whereas worldwide figure being est. ₹348 million. The all time worldwide gross was recorded as est. ₹429 million.

The film underperformed and hence, was declared as a flop by Box Office India. In a year-end box office performance review by DNA, the film was rounded in the category of big-budget movies. Siddharth Roy Kapur (distribution rights) admitted that 2009 was a tough year for the Indian film industry. Producer Mohan Kumar added: "Movies which did good business at the box office this year were fun films [...] even though Kareena-Saif starrer Kurbaan had a backdrop of terrorism, it did not do well."

== Awards ==
List of awards and nominations
Distributor	Category	Recipient	Result	Ref
Apsara Film & Television Producers Guild Awards	Best Actress	Kareena Kapoor	Nominated	
Apsara Film & Television Producers Guild Awards	Best Supporting Actress	Kirron Kher	Won	
Apsara Film & Television Producers Guild Awards	Best Re-Recording/Mixing	Ajay Kumar P. B.	Nominated	
Filmfare Awards	Best Actress	Kareena Kapoor	Nominated	
Filmfare Awards	Best Male Playback Singer	Salim Merchant and Sonu Nigam for "Shukran Allah"	Nominated	
IIFA Awards	Best Supporting Actress	Kirron Kher	Nominated	
Screen Awards	Best Actress (Popular Choice)	Kareena Kapoor	Won	
Stardust Awards	Star of the Year – Female	Kareena Kapoor	Won	
Stardust Awards	Best Film Of The Year – Action / Thriller	Karan Johar	Nominated	
Stardust Awards	Hottest New Director	Rensil D'Silva	Nominated	
Stardust Awards	Best Supporting Actor	Vivek Oberoi	Nominated	
Stardust Awards	Best Supporting Actress	Kirron Kher	Won	

== Controversies ==
=== Film release and theatrical poster ===
A petitioner, Mohammed Ali, filed a petition in Bombay High Court to stay the release of the film after claiming two of the songs ("Shukran Allah" and "Ali Maula") were objectionable. However, the Court refused to grant interim relief in a petition seeking a stay on release on the ground that its songs hurt sentiments of the Muslim community. In a related event, a local court rejected a private complaint seeking to delete an obscene shot (portrayed through the song "Rasiya") in the film showing Kapoor and Khan in partially nude poses. The Magistrate, who rejected the complaint, observed that no offence of alleged obscenity was made out against the film makers and actors. In another event, where the first poster of the film represented Khan bare-chested and Kapoor backless, she stated: "There is love, passion and violence - all combined in the film and what better way than to show it through a single still? You too would agree that there is nothing sleazy or vulgar about it." Women representing the Shiv Sena wrapped a saree around the film's poster during a defense. The party objected that the backless image shown in posters is against the Hindu culture of the state, and hence should have been immediately withdrawn.

=== Lawsuits ===
Dharma Productions tied up with Australia-based Mitu Bhowmick's Swish Films to film a few scenes in Philadelphia and then left owing money to hundreds of local actors and vendors. Both Dharma and Swish Films were sued, according to documents filed in Common Pleas Court. The lawsuit sought in excess of $150,000 to be paid to in unpaid services and expenses for 25 of the vendors. The lawsuit requested restraining order that prevented the representatives of Dharma Productions from leaving the US with its assets and the shot footage. There were paid cheques that bounced, leaving more than $500,000 in unpaid bills.

Dharma then offered certain workers half the amount they are owed, whereas for the rest, they paid the full amount owed, including to the City of Philadelphia and Teamsters Local 107.

=== Dubbing ===
In a few released prints of the film, a scene where Oberoi, Khan, and their university classmates interact in the film, the white students are speaking in English to a discussion on Islamic fundamentalism and America, a crux of the theme. D'Silva was miffed with the UTV for the dubbing of those dub those lines in Hindi. However, initially, UTV assured D'Silva that dubbing was only for a very small number of prints that would go in the Hindi belt where English was not understood. Instead, UTV dubbed the sequence in 500 prints of Kurbaan. However, Siddharth Roy Kapur added that being an important scene of the core debate, in order to not alienate a non-English speaking audience, they dubbed the scene in certain areas.
