= Daswani =

Daswani is a surname. Notable people with the surname include:

- Kavita Daswani, Indian-American author
- Neil Daswani, American computer specialist
- Yasmin Daswani (born 1994), English-born Hong Kong cricketer and lawyer
