= Adiyum Andamum =

2014 Indian film by Kaushik

- Theatrical release poster
- Directed by: Kaushik
- Written by: Kaushik
- Starring: Ajay; Mitali Agarwal; Kavitha Srinivasan
- Cinematography: DS. Vaasan
- Edited by: M. Ramesh Bharathi
- Music by: L. V. Ganesan
- Production companies: RSR Screenz; N.K. Kraft
- Release date: 14 March 2014
- Country: India
- Language: Tamil

Adiyum Andamum (transl. Beginning and the ending) is a 2014 Indian Tamil-language psychological thriller film written and directed by Kaushik, making his directorial debut. The film stars Ajay, Mitali Agarwal and Kavita Srinivasan, with Ramanathan, Siddarth, Venkat and Yuvan Swang in supporting roles. It was released on 14 March 2014.

== Plot ==
Karan is a psychiatrist. Orphaned at a young age, he was brought up by his maternal uncle. Though not very rich, Karan's uncle ensured that Karan got the best of education and became a doctor. Karan, for his part, turns out to become a psychiatrist. Karan is a psychiatrist with a difference. He believes in the human touch. Circumstances take him on a professional trip to a reputed medical institute where he takes charge as lecturer cum psychiatrist. The minute he lands in Ooty he is at ease and enjoys every moment at his new destination. As he settles in the new place, he feels at home and at ease. Soon he gets used to a new routine in his life but just as he thinks that life can't be more perfect he starts experiencing certain disturbances. He starts seeing things in his room which defy the human mind. At first, he doesn't take it seriously, but soon they intensify in their hostility with each new day. Soon the disturbances are more terrifying than he can imagine. Doctor Anbarasu is the founder cum dean cum MD of the institute. He is soft-spoken, but a man who will get what he wants. In him Karan sees a father figure in the beginning which slowly changes with each growing day. As he sees a new side to this person, Karan is made to wonder about the true character of the dean. Shalini is a reporter who hosts a reality show on a reputed channel. She arrives at the institute to do a cover story. The first encounter between Karan and Shalini promotes a kind of respect for Karan in Shalini. This respect slowly blossoms into something else. As their paths meet regularly, Karan feels he can confide in Shalini about his disturbances and his sudden trepidation about the dean. Curiosity kindles the reporter in Shalini and she, along with Karan, embark on an investigative journey to find out what really is going on in the institute. The going is tough, as there are man made hindrances in their path. At one point, it is clear to them that no one is telling the truth.

Soon, both Karan and Shalini feel that they are being followed and that at any point of time something disastrous is going to happen. As time runs out for Shalini to leave the place, they have that much less time to find out the truth about the place and the true face of Dr Anbarasu. The truth shocks them. Sometimes what you see need not be the reality at all.

== Cast ==
- Ajay as Karan
- Mitali Agarwal as Priya
- Kavita Srinivasan as Shalini
- Ramanathan
- Siddarth
- Venkat
- Yuvan Swang

== Production ==
Kolangal fame Ajay forayed into films with Adiyum Andamum. It is the directorial debut of Kaushik, previously an actor.

== Soundtrack ==
Music was composed by newcomer L. V. Ganesan, son of L. Vaidyanathan.

Song	Lyricsit	Singers
"Penne Penne"	Kaushik	Aalap Raju
"Mayam Seidhayo"	Kaushik	Chinmayi
"Ararirao"	Na. Muthukumar	Naresh Iyer
"Adiyum Andamum" (title track)	Kaushik	L. V. Ganeshan
"Penne" (remix)	Kaushik	Lv. Muthu, Kaushik
"Pain Of Love" (Instrumental)		

== Critical reception ==
Malini Mannath of The New Indian Express noted the film's similarities to Shutter Island (2010) and wrote, "A promising work from a debutante, it's a fairly watchable fare for lovers of the horror-genre". Manigandan K R of The Times of India wrote, "If [Kaushik] has looked to make a film that seeks to raise awareness on the trauma of patients suffering from disassociative amnesia and those dear to them, then one cannot deny that he has succeeded to a fair extent. If, on the other hand, he has only looked to deliver an intense, emotional love story, then, one must concede that he hasn't made it past the post".
