= Morning All Day =

1997 novel by Chris Paling

- Front cover of paperback edition (Vintage, 1998)
- Author: Chris Paling
- Genre: Fiction
- Publisher: Jonathan Cape
- Publication date: 1997
- Publication place: United Kingdom

Morning All Day is a novel by Chris Paling. It was first published in 1997 by Jonathan Cape.

== Synopsis ==
The novel follows Gordon Meadows, a middle-aged history teacher whose married life unravels when he has an affair with a friend.

== Publication history ==
Morning All Day was first published in hardback by Jonathan Cape in 1997. Vintage Books published a paperback edition in 1998.

== Reception ==
Ong Sor Fern of The Straits Times described Morning All Day as “late 30-something Breakfast Club” and praised Paling's “knack for bringing his characters to life”.

In a positive review for The Independent, Christopher Hawtree wrote that “Time and again, Paling touches off a phrase which emphasises the novel's jagged world-view, a rawness that springs from the shifting points of view of his episodic structure.” He added that the novel “forms something distinct from its parochial components”.
