= The Silent Sentry =

1999 novel by Chris Paling

- Front cover of the paperback edition (Jonathan Cape, 1999)
- Author: Chris Paling
- Genre: Fiction
- Publisher: Jonathan Cape
- Publication date: 1999
- Publication place: United Kingdom

The Silent Sentry is a novel by Chris Paling. It was first published in 1999 by Jonathan Cape.

== Synopsis ==
Maurice Reid, a radio producer at the Corporation, navigates office politics and an increasingly dysfunctional domestic set-up as he searches for meaning in his life.

== Reception ==
In a review for The Guardian, Isobel Montgomery wrote that it was “just the kind of novel that you would expect mid-career BBC staff to write when not bitching about dumbing down and management” and that, while “well-written”, it suffers from “utter predictability”.

Nicholas Royle’s review for The Independent described the novel as “richly textured with visual details” relating to the world of radio production, and praised the work’s “wit” and “sense of comic timing”.
