= Manjari (film) =

Nepali film

- Theatrical release poster
- Directed by: Ganesh Dev Panday
- Written by: Ganesh Dev Panday
- Story by: Sakthivel Balaji
- Produced by: Naresh Pandey, Mahesh Chalise
- Starring: Gaurav Pahari; Sujata Koirala; Resham Firiri; Tika Pahari; Bidhya Karki
- Cinematography: Mahesh Poudel
- Edited by: Ananta Thapaliya
- Music by: Sanup poudel; Pushpa Gurung; Anjjan; Kali Prasad Baskota
- Production company: Tuka Entertainment (P)Ltd
- Distributed by: Mountain River Films
- Release date: 3 May 2013
- Running time: 153 minutes
- Country: Nepal
- Language: Nepali

Manjari is a 2013 Nepali film written and directed by Ganesh Dev Panday and starring Gaurav Pahari and Sujata Koirala.

== Plot ==
Ishwor is a motorbike mechanic in Butwal and lives a simple routine life until he meets a young girl named Manjari. Manjari, daughter of a powerful landlord, falls in love with Ishwor for his simplicity irrespective of their differences. Manjari's dad decides to marry her off with another boy who matches their standard in the society. Manjari is upset by this development and goes to meet Ishwor to inform him about her dad's decision. Manjari forces Ishwor to take her away threatening to kill herself if Ishwor fails to comply. Ishwor agrees with her and takes her to Kathmandu.

== Cast ==
- Gaurav Pahari as Ishwor
- Sujata Koirala as Manjari
- Resham Firiri as Homme (Ishwor's Friend)
- Tika Pahari as Manjari's dad
- Bishnu Rijal as Manjari's uncle
- Deepa Pokhrel as Manjari's friend
- Sujan Thapa as Fuchee
- Kopila Thapa as Manjari's mom
- Bidhya Karki as Ishwor's mom

== Songs ==
No.	Title	Singer(s)	Length
1.	"Jadoo"	Sanup poudel, Pushpa Gurung	4:58
2.	"K Hundai cha"	Prabisha Adhikari	3:58
3.	"Mayale bandhyau"		4:08
4.	"Good Luck"		2:60
5.	"Daiba Hey"	Sanup Poudel	4:52
6.	"Maya Le Badhyo Yasari"	Prashant Subedi, Prabisha Adhikari	6:30
7.	"Aganai Ma Phoolai Phool"		1:59
