= P.S. Zindagi =

- Genre: Situational Comedy
- Created by: Kavita Srinivasan
- Written by: Kavita Srinivasan, Priya Poudyal
- Directed by: Utpal Jha, Hyolmo Pasang Dawa
- Starring: Rajkumar Pudasaini; Sujata Koirala; Utpal Jha; Kavita Srinivasan; Kalsang D. Lama
- Composer: James Pradhan
- Country of origin: Nepal
- Original languages: Nepali, English, Hindi
- No. of seasons: 1
- No. of episodes: 7

Production
- Executive producer: Kavita Srinivasan
- Producer: Musumusu Productions
- Production location: Nepal
- Cinematography: Rupesh Thapa
- Editors: Shankar Koirala, Animesh Sapkota, Pawan R. Joshi
- Running time: 20 mins

Original release
- Network: Musumusu TV
- Release: 25 April 2016

Related
- https://www.youtube.com/c/Musumusutv

P.S. Zindagi (Post Seismic Life) is Nepal's first online sitcom. It shows the unfolding of comedy and drama in the lives of five Nepali youth from diverse backgrounds, following the April 2015 Nepal earthquake. It was a creative experiment where a small team used their own individual resources and passion to create a fun and self-empowering narrative of the lives of the urban youth.

== Cast ==
- Rajkumar Pudasaini as Krishna
- Sujata Koirala as Kokab Akhtar
- Kavita Srinivasan as Juna Akhtar
- Utpal Jha as JP
- Kalsang D. Lama as Dolma
- Menuka Pradhan (Cameo)

== Awards ==
P.S. Zindagi has won the Outstanding Excellence award for Direction and Ensemble Cast in the WRPN.TV Global Webisode Competition (WGWC), in Summer 2016. This is UK-based global competition for webisodes and TV series from 41 countries. This competition aims to promote and present a worldwide community of Webisodes/TV series.

P.S. Zindagi has also been officially selected to compete in the Marseille Web Fest (October 2016), the DMOFF Festival (August 2016) and the Indiewise Festival (September 2016).
