= Sujata Koirala (actress) =

Nepalese actress

- Occupation: Actress
- Years active: 2013–present

Sujata Koirala is a Nepalese actress, known for the Nepali movie Manjari and the online sitcom P.S. Zindagi.

== Career ==
Sujata made her debut as Manjari in the romantic movie Manjari and received positive reviews. Sujata won the award for the Best Debut Actor (Female) at the National Film Awards (Nepal) 2014 for her performance.

She then starred in the online sitcom P.S. Zindagi in the role of Kokab Akhtar appearing opposite Kavita Srinivasan who plays the role of her sister Juna Akhtar.

In 2020, Sujata starred in the short drama The Migrants directed by Parbat Chapagai based on an immigrant couple's fight against real and surreal forces in USA. It screened at First Run Film Festival.

== Filmography ==
Year	Film	Role	Language	Notes
2013	Manjari	Manjari	Nepali	
2016	P.S. Zindagi	Kokab Akhtar	Nepali	Online Miniseries
2020	The Migrants (short)	Kusum	Nepali	Short Drama

== Awards ==
Year	Award	Category	Result	Ref(s)
2014	National Film Awards (Nepal) 2014 (2070 BS) (NFDC National Film Award)	Best Debut Actor (Female)	Won	
