= Salaam, Paris =

2006 novel by Kavita Daswani

- Author: Kavita Daswani
- Language: English
- Genre: Women's literature
- Publisher: Plume
- Publication date: 2006
- Publication place: United States
- Media type: Print
- ISBN: 9780452287464

Salaam, Paris is a novel written by Kavita Daswani, who is a columnist for Women's Wear Daily.

== Plot ==
The novel is based on a story of a Muslim girl named Tanaya Shah; a young Indian girl mesmerized by western culture. She was raised by her mother and grandfather, as her father abandoned Tanaya's mother when Tanaya was a young child. Tanaya's grandfather treated Tanaya with the utmost respect. He treated her like his own daughter, but Tanaya still felt that she was neglected.

Because Tanaya's mother was abandoned, Tanaya's grandfather (Tanaya's mother's father) would remain extremely cautious of Tanaya's roundabouts. This became difficult for Tanaya, as she wanted to explore the world outside of Mahim; place she Tanaya was born and raised. Adding to this, Tanaya was born in a family where women had the best facial features. This was true for all women in her family, except for her mother. As the story progresses, we learn that Tanaya's mother was thought to have been abandoned because of this lacking feature. Unfortunately, Tanaya's mother was well aware of this fact, and thus hated Tanaya. Over the years, her mother had become sarcastic and cruel towards Tanaya. This was one of the reasons that Tanaya was more attached to her grandfather.

Getting back to Tanaya's fantasy of the western culture, she would often read magazines like Teen Cosmo with her friend, Nilu. These magazines featured stylish clothing and models. Tanaya told Nilu that she wanted to move from Mahim to Paris. She also expressed an interest in becoming a model, but her main goal was to experience a different lifestyle and gain more independence.

Her grandfather saw it a bit differently. He attested this new change with her married life. Call it a fortunate event, but Tanaya received a proposal. He happened to be the son of Tanaya's grandfather's friend. His name was Tariq Khan, who happened to live in Paris. Tanaya saw this as an opportunity to see Paris.

Fate of luck strikes, and her grandfather allows her to visit Paris, where she became part of the modeling industry. (The book has a detailed account of the difficulties she faces to become a model).

In the end, Tanaya finally marries Tariq Khan, and realizes that she was pursuing rather a mere image of herself.

== Reception ==
Booklist called it "an engaging and sweet tale".

== Reviews ==
- Library Journal, by Shirley N. Quan
- Kirkus Reviews
- USA Today
