= Newton's Swing =

2000 novel by Chris Paling

Newton’s Swing
- Author: Chris Paling
- Genre: Fiction
- Publisher: Jonathan Cape
- Publication date: 2000
- Publication place: United Kingdom

Newton’s Swing is a novel by Chris Paling. It was first published in 2000 by Jonathan Cape.

== Synopsis ==
John Wayne is an Englishman living in New York, where he works in an advertising agency. He finds his life in disarray when his art dealer wife Susan is shot dead in their apartment while their son sleeps in the room next door.

== Reception ==
Glasgow Herald named Newton’s Swing its book of the day for 22 July 2000, calling the novel “the work of a real writer” and “full of neat insights into the Disneyfication of American culture,” while also noting it had “big problems” such as the character of Susan being “a fantasised vision of sensuality”. The review concluded that the novel was “compelling” as it “realises the benefit of keeping us in the dark”.

Alex Clark wrote in her review for The Guardian that “Paling never quite succeeds in pulling all the elements of his novel together” but commended “his impressive ability to create and manage a range of atmospheres”. She concluded that “Paling is a great thing among British writers: a largely unsung talent who keeps on experimenting and refuses to write an easy book.”
