= Deserters (novel) =

1996 novel by Chris Paling

- Front cover of paperback edition (Vintage, 1997)
- Author: Chris Paling
- Genre: Fiction
- Publisher: Jonathan Cape
- Publication date: 1996
- Publication place: United Kingdom

Deserters is a novel by Chris Paling. It was first published in 1996 by Jonathan Cape.

== Synopsis ==
Cliffie, a promiscuous and misanthropic wanderer, lives with his current partner Barry in a flat above a café they run together. One day, Cliffie decides to leave Barry to help their erstwhile flatmate May break out of the hospital where she has been sectioned.

After successfully breaking May out of hospital, Cliffie spends the night with her in an amusement arcade on Brighton pier, where they cause considerable damage, attracting the attention of local gangster Hollister, who seeks money for the repair works.

Cliffie and May go on the run together to avoid both Clifford and the authorities. While on the run, May kidnaps an infant from an unlocked car outside a primary school despite Cliffie’s protests, and they spend the night with the child in a showroom house that is part of a new building development. Cliffie and May have sex.

The next day, they safely deposit the child in a safe place and May lets herself get arrested by the police, while Cliffie manages to evade capture. He sleeps in a farm, where a woman called Mary finds him. She shelters him for a few days, as she is seemingly bored and missing her dead husband. They start a sexual relationship. Cliffie eventually leaves as he worries that he is growing too accustomed to the domestic setup.

Cliffie carries on to an address in Maida Vale given to him by May. When he arrives, he finds it locked, but he strikes up conversation with a man from the next-door house, called Ron. They have tea together in Ron’s house, where Ron talks about his wife Edie, who is apparently out playing bingo. Cliffie eventually leaves and breaks into the house May identified, where he finds Ron’s wife Edie having sex with a father and son. They do not mind Cliffie’s intrusion, and Edie says that she often tells Ron she is out playing bingo while in fact she is having her sexual needs met in the abandoned house. It transpires that this abandoned house is May’s childhood home. Cliffie then spends the night back at Ron and Edie’s house.

The following morning, Hollister shows up unexpectedly at Ron and Edie’s house, having located Cliffie by visiting May in solitary confinement and pressuring her into disclosing Cliffie’s potential whereabouts. Hollister threatens Cliffie, urging him to return to Brighton to pay his debts and to patch things up with Barry.

Returning to the café in Brighton, Cliffie reunites with Barry, but they are interrupted by Hollister and his thugs, who drive Cliffie away to a secluded area, savagely beat him, and leave him for dead in a supermarket carpark, where he is found by a couple of youths who work there.

Hospitalised, and under police supervision, Cliffie recovers, before being tried for his part in the kidnapping of the infant. He is sentenced and sent to prison, where the only thing that keeps him sane is the thought of being reunited with May, who sends him a letter one day to say she is pregnant with Cliffie’s child. Cliffie is happy at this news, and sends her letters in response, but none of them arrive to her.

While in prison, Cliffie learns from a café regular during visiting hours that Barry has killed himself. Cliffie feels responsible for his death, as he never fully reciprocated his love. He also learns that May has had her child, a girl, and is living on a hippie commune in Dorset with a new man, Kit.

Upon his release from prison, Cliffie goes to confront Hollister over past events, including confusion over the legal ownership of Barry's café. He finds Hollister has changed. He has aged, and has little appetite left for the life of crime he has pursued. Cliffie learns that Hollister and Barry were brothers.

Finally, Cliffie travels to Dorset to win back May, but finds her happy and settled with Kit, who runs the commune where they live. He decides to leave her in peace and pursues a new life in London as a barman. He exchanges letters with May every year, who is raising their daughter, called Hope, with Kit.

Hope eventually writes a letter to Cliffie when she is a teenager, signalling she is open to meeting her father. The novel ends with Cliffie agreeing it’s the right time to meet.

== Publication history ==
"Deserters” was first published in hardback by Jonathan Cape in 1996. Vintage Books published a paperback edition in 1997.

== Reception ==
A D Reid, in a review for Literary Review, described “Deserters” as “a strangely compelling read” even though “The plot is far from flawless.” He commented on the novels many “vivid and disturbing” episodes and commended its “raw energy.”

In his review for The Independent, Christopher Hawtree criticised the way Paling’s “authorial voice keeps creeping into Cliffie[‘s] territory,” but went on to state that “Whatever the faults of the novel's shifting tone, it has something of that distinct view of the world which made one certain that the author of “After the Raid” is among the most accomplished English novelists to emerge in recent years.”

In 2000, The Independent’s Nicholas Royce identified "Deserters" as an example of the “sub-genre of entertainingly grim seaside-resort fiction”.
