= Aki Narula =

Indian fashion and costume designer

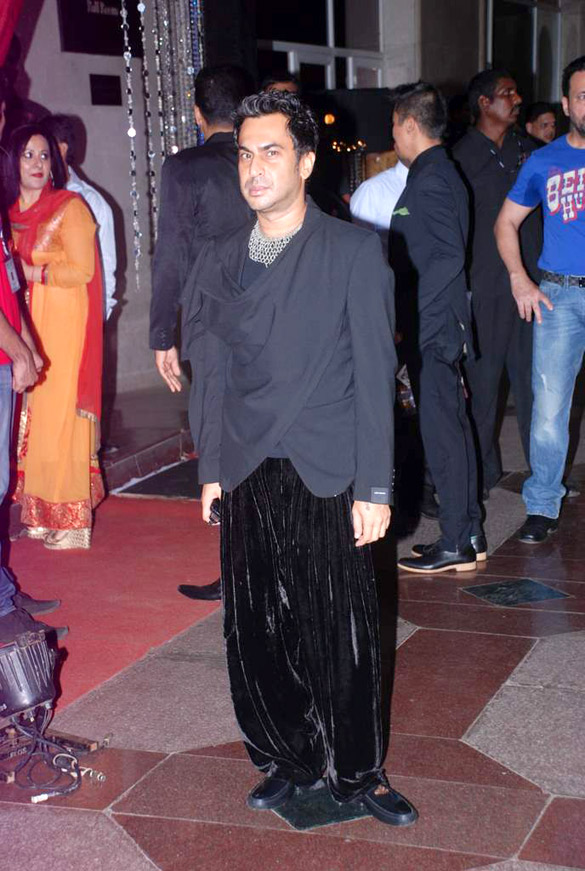
- Aki Narula at Esha Deol's sangeet ceremony
- Born: 1968 (age 57–58); Kolkata, West Bengal, India
- Occupations: Fashion designer, costume designer
- Years active: 1994–present

Aki Narula (born 1968) is an Indian fashion designer, costume designer and wardrobe stylist in Hindi films, who is most known for films like Bunty Aur Babli (2005), Don - The Chase Begins Again (2006), Jhoom Barabar Jhoom (2007) and Dostana (2008). His brand label "AKI" was launched in 1996.

== Early life and education ==
Born and brought up in Kolkata, he did his schooling from La Martiniere Calcutta, and passed out in 1987. He graduated in commerce from St. Xavier's College, Kolkata, while at college, he started designing clothes for rock concerts, college plays and Xavotsav, the annual college fest. He worked with the Lintas Group, as a management trainee, for a period of ten months, before going to Arizona State University, for a communications course.

Aki has had no formal training in fashion designing. "While studying commerce at St. Xavier's College, Calcutta, I was completely taken up by fashion. And despite no formal training in fashion designing, I began to design outfits for my friends," he said.

== Career ==
Upon returning to in 1992, he started a cost accounting programme in Kolkata; he move to fashion happened when in 1994, he took part in the 'Fashion Designer award' of Damania Airlines, held across five Indian Metros cities. He entered the contest from Kolkata, he was chosen the winner. This started his fashion career in Kolkata. Eventually and launched his own brand, Aki, in 1996 and has his first fashion show with "Melange", a designer boutique at Opera House, Mumbai. Starting with Melange, he gradually started selling in eleven stores across India. In 2000, he participated in Lakme India Fashion Week and in the following year his entire collection was taken up by Selfridges (UK). He was appointed the design director at Sheetal Design Studio Mumbai in 2002. In 2004, he presented at the Grand Finale of India Fashion Week, a collection themed around the '50s with red and fuchsia being the premier colours.

Though he had previously designed for Mira Nair's Monsoon Wedding in 2005, his big break into Bollywood came with Yash Raj Films’ Bunty Aur Babli in 2005 directed by Shaad Ali, in which he gave a new look to Patiala salwars and kurtis. This led to a string of films, which got noticed for clothes designed and styled by him. In the subsequent years as he got busy with his film projects, he gradually steered away from mainstream fashion designing, and seldom appeared in Fashion Weeks, though he planned to re-launch his label, and balance between Fashion Week and film projects.

Over the years, he got acclaim for the looks for Amitabh Bachchan in Jhoom Barabar Jhoom (2007), his second film with Shaad Ali, Abhishek Bachchan and John Abraham in Dostana (2008), Kareena Kapoor's look in Tashan (2008) and later her mismatched look, employing the colour-blocking technique in Kambakkht Ishq (2009) and Ranbir Kapoor in Bachna Ae Haseeno (2008) and in Rockstar (2011)

In 2009, sports-lifestyle brand Puma, which had previously worked with Alexander McQueen, Yasuhiro Mihara and Sergio Rossi, signed on Aki to create 'Black Label', a range of apparel, footwear and accessories to hit Puma stores in February 2010. In 2012, he designed the costume for Asin Thottumkal in Housefull 2.

== Filmography ==
- Monsoon Wedding (2001)
- Bunty Aur Babli (2005)
- Garam Masala (2005)
- Bluffmaster! (2005)
- Don - The Chase Begins Again (2006)
- Jhoom Barabar Jhoom (2007)
- Tashan (2008)
- Bhoothnath (2008)
- Bachna Ae Haseeno (2008)
- Dostana (2008)
- Rab Ne Bana Di Jodi (2008)
- Kambakkht Ishq (2009)
- Shortkut (2009)
- Kurbaan (2009)
- Paa (2009)
- Housefull (2010)
- Lamhaa (2010)
- I Am (2010)
- Tees Maar Khan (2010)
- Chillar Party (2011)
- Rascals (2011)
- Rockstar (2011)
- Agent Vinod (2011)
- Housefull 2 (2012)
- Highway (2014)
- Pati Patni Aur Woh Do (2026)
