= After the Raid (novel) =

1995 novel by Chris Paling

- Front cover of the paperback edition (Vintage, 1996)
- Author: Chris Paling
- Genre: Fiction
- Publisher: Jonathan Cape
- Publication date: 1995
- Publication place: United Kingdom

After the Raid is the debut novel by Chris Paling. It was first published in 1995 by Jonathan Cape.

== Synopsis ==
Set during The Blitz, the novel follows Gregory Swift, a man whose mental state is impacted by a German bombing raid on London. He travels by train to visit his sister in Manchester; on this journey he meets a nurse and a young boy, and explores an unnamed village with them when their train is unexpectedly diverted.

The novel is in four parts. Chapters are marked by headings describing the action’s location, which include: ‘LONDON,’ ‘MANCHESTER,’ ‘THE HOSPITAL’ and ‘THE VILLAGE’.

== Publication history ==
After the Raid was first published in hardback by Jonathan Cape in 1995. Vintage Books published a paperback edition in 1996.

== Reception ==
Jason Cowley’s review for The Independent described Paling’s style as “fluent and simple, unencumbered with superfluous detail” and concluded the novel to be “an impressive feat of historical imagining”.

John Sweeney, in his review for Literary Review, wrote that “Part of the book’s haunting power is due to the beautifully crafted opening pages… They alone justify the cost of the book… The creation of suspense through such laconic writing reminds one of Graham Greene”. Sweeney went on to call the novel “As bleak as can be.”

Melissa McClements of The Guardian similarly noted that Graham Greene was "clearly an influence" on the novel.
