= Scientists for Labour =

UK socialist society promoting science in politics

- Abbreviation: SfL
- Formation: 1994
- Purpose: Connect UK scientists with policy makers
- Chair: Johnathan Guy
- Affiliations: Labour Party
- Website: www.sfl.org.uk

Scientists for Labour (SfL) is a socialist society affiliated to the British Labour Party. It is open to supporters of the Labour Party interested or involved in UK science and technology. Notable patrons include the Nobel Prize winning geneticist, Sir Paul Nurse FRS, the businessman and Chancellor of the University of Cambridge, Lord David Sainsbury, and the former Prime Minister, Dr. Gordon Brown. Its stated aims are to be a strong political voice for science, to improve the understanding of science within the Labour Party and nationally, and to advise the parliamentary Labour Party and Party front bench leadership on science policy issues. SfL organise a range of events, including panel discussions, networking meetings, and collaboration.

== History ==
Scientists for Labour was founded in 1994 by the Scottish molecular virologist Willie Russell, amongst others, to be a vehicle for scientists within the Labour Party. SfL tried to lobby the Labour Party before the 1997 UK general election to pledge the creation of a cabinet level secretary of science, something that it was unsuccessful in doing, though it is still a policy that the group supports. During the 2000s, the group submitted evidence on science policy to the Science and Technology Select Committee.

During the COVID-19 pandemic, the organisation began to publish regular reports on the science around COVID-19, including both daily briefings and long form reports. These reports have earned SfL public praise from prominent Labour figures including the Leader of the Labour Party Sir Keir Starmer KCB QC MP, and former Prime Minister Dr. Gordon Brown HonFRSE. These reports have been on topics such as the impact of COVID-19 on BAME communities in the U.K., the Scottish government's handling of COVID-19, the importance of ensuring that research can continue in spite of pandemic conditions, the importance of the transparency in government scientific advice, and the importance of maintaining links with European scientists both during and after the COVID-19 pandemic.

In January 2023, SfL published a report co-authored by executive committee members Isabel Creed, Conor Cooper, Kartik Kavi and Sanjush Dalmia titled "R&D for Economic Security from Future Pandemics", with endorsements from the CBI, the Association of the British Pharmaceutical Industry, the UK BioIndustry Association and SME4Labour.

In March 2024, SfL published a report authored by committee member Sanjush Dalmia titled "Deepfakes, Elections and National Security", with an endorsement from future Labour MP Daniel Aldridge, then at BCS, the Chartered Institute for IT. The report was covered in Politico and UK Tech News.

In September 2024, SfL published a report authored by committee member Conor Cooper titled "Report on Climate Spending Commitments".

In November 2025, SfL published a report authored by Alfred Lawrence and committee member Dr Sanjush Dalmia titled "Invest in the Global Fund for National, Economic and Health Security".

In June 2026, SfL published a briefing for MPs titled "Flexible Research Funding: the Foundation of Growth".

Previous members of the Executive Committee include the chemical physicist Benjamin J. Whitaker, and politician and teacher Martin Whitfield.

== National Executive Committee ==
The 2026-27 SfL NEC are as follows:

Chair: Johnathan Guy

Vice Chair Policy: Dr Juna Sathian

Vice Chair Membership: Molly Holland

Secretary: Elyse Ward

Parliamentary Liaison Officer: Cllr Sarbaz Barznji

Treasurer: Daniel Villar

Events Officer: Jonathan Marsh

Other Committee Members: Conor Savage; Jennifer Mills

== Notable Members ==
- Chi Onwurah MP
- Martin Whitfield MSP
- Benjamin J. Whitaker, Physicist
- Sir Paul Nurse FRS, Geneticist
- Lord David Sainsbury HonFRS HonFREng, Chancellor at the University of Cambridge
- Dr. Gordon Brown, Former Prime Minister
- Daniel Zeichner MP
- Adam Thompson MP
- Cllr Sarbaz Barznji

== Local Branches ==
- Newcastle upon Tyne Central - established in July 2020. Chaired by Juna Sathian, who is also the Vice Chair (Policy) of SfL.
- Ealing - established in September 2021. A wider London branch is set to be created in 2023.
