= Benjamin J. Whitaker =

Chemistry professor

J Benjamin C Whitaker
- Born: 15 May 1956
- Died: September 21, 2022 (aged 66)
- Education: University of Sussex
- Scientific career
- Fields: Chemistry, Physics
- Workplaces: University of Leeds

J Benjamin C Whitaker (born 15 May 1956, died 21 Sept 2022) was Professor of Chemical Physics in the School of Chemistry at the University of Leeds.

Whitaker was educated at University College School, London and the University of Sussex (B.Sc. in chemical physics, 1978) where he also completed his doctorate on laser induced emission spectroscopy under the supervision of Professor Tony McCaffery (D.Phil., 1981). He was mainly known for work in molecular reaction dynamics and photofragment-ion imaging. He was also associated with some of the early chemical applications of the web with Henry Rzepa. He was also a committed science communicator and educator, and a founding member of the Superposition arts-science collective. As of 2021, he was on the executive committee of Scientists for Labour. He died in September 2022 following a period of illness.

== Selected publications ==
Whitaker, Benjamin J (ed.) (2003), Imaging in Molecular Dynamics, Cambridge University Press, ISBN 0-521-810590

Tsubouchi, M; Whitaker, BJ; Wang, L; Kohguchi, H; Suzuki, T (2001), "Photoelectron imaging on time-dependent molecular alignment created by a femtosecond laser pulse", Phys. Rev. Lett., 86 (20): 4500–4503, Bibcode:2001PhRvL..86.4500T, doi:10.1103/PhysRevLett.86.4500, PMID 11384268

Hall, G; Whitaker, BJ (1994), "Laser-induced grating spectroscopy", J. Chem. Soc., Faraday Trans., 90: 1–16, doi:10.1039/FT9949000001

Suits, AG; Bontuyan, LS; Houston, PL; Whitaker, BJ (1992), "Differential cross-sections for state-selected products by direct imaging - Ar+NO", J. Chem. Phys., 96 (11): 8618–8620, Bibcode:1992JChPh..96.8618S, doi:10.1063/1.462265

McCaffery, AJ; Proctor, MJ; Whitaker, BJ (1986), "Rotational energy transfer - polarization and scaling", Annu. Rev. Phys. Chem., 37: 223–244, Bibcode:1986ARPC...37..223M, doi:10.1146/annurev.pc.37.100186.001255

Whitaker, BJ; Brechignac, P (1983), "A new fitting law for rotational energy-transfer", Chem. Phys. Lett., 95 (4–5): 407–412, Bibcode:1983CPL....95..407W, doi:10.1016/0009-2614(83)80583-1
