= Gabriella Gibson =

British medical entomologist

Gabriella Gibson FRES
- Education: University of Sussex (PhD)
- Scientific career
- Workplaces: Imperial College London, London School of Hygiene and Tropical Medicine, University of Greenwich

Gabriella "Gay" Gibson FRES is a medical entomologist in the UK, she specialises in mosquitoes. In 2013 she was appointed Professor of Medical Entomology at the University of Greenwich.

== Education and career ==
Gibson was educated at the University of Sussex where she studied a PhD looking at mosquito behaviour and was awarded the degree in 1981. She was a postdoctoral researcher at the Silwood Park campus of Imperial College London and later a lecturer at the London School of Hygiene and Tropical Medicine.

In 1998 she moved to the Natural Resource Institute at the University of Greenwich where she leads on Pest Behaviour Research. In 2013 was appointed Professor of Medical Entomology.

== Research ==
Gibson's research looks the sensory physiology and behaviour of mosquitoes and how this influences their interactions with humans and other animals.

She found that mosquitoes can adapt their acoustic behaviour to aid mating, they will adjust their wingbeat frequency to synchronise with that of a mosquito of the opposite sex flying near them, so as to aid mating in mid air. The insects listen to each other's wingbeat frequencies with a special organ on their antenna called the Johnston's organ. Her team subsequently found that mosquitoes of the same sex or of different species are not able to match wingbeat frequencies and are therefore not able to mate.

Gibson's team have created a new mosquito trap that can mimic human body odour and incorporates design to encourage mosquitoes to land on the trap surface.
