= Kavita Srinivasan =

Indian actress

- Born: Kavita Srinivasan
- Occupations: Actress, producer, director
- Years active: 2009–present

Kavita Srinivasan is an Indian actress, producer, director and screenwriter based in Nepal. She is known for the Nepali online sitcom P.S. Zindagi (2016).

== Personal life ==
Srinivasan grew up in Papua New Guinea, Zambia, India, and USA. She studied Biochemistry at Brandeis University and completed her Bachelor’s degree in Architecture and City Planning from the Massachusetts Institute of Technology (MIT). She also takes part in theater and productions.

== Career ==
Srinivasan made her Hindi debut in Kurbaan in 2009 and has starred in South Indian movies as well. She made her Telugu debut in the movie Kalicharan in 2013 and her Tamil debut in Adiyum Andamum in 2014.

Srinivasan also appeared in a 2011 documentary In Search of God which depicts the transformative journey of an American woman who finds deeper meaning in her life after traveling to a mystical island in India where the inhabitants use artistic expression as a means for communing with God.

Srinivasan made her Nepali debut in the online sitcom P.S. Zindagi of which she is the producer, writer and creator as well. She plays the role of Juna Akhtar and stars opposite Sujata Koirala who plays the role of her sister, Kokab Akhtar.

== Filmography ==
=== Films ===
Year	Film	Role	Language	Notes
2009	Kurbaan	Syeda	Hindi	
2011	In Search of God	Kavita	English	Documentary
2013	Kalicharan	Kalavathi	Telugu	
2014	Adiyum Andamum	Shalini	Tamil	
2016	P.S. Zindagi	Juna Akhtar	Nepali	Web Series

=== Theatre ===
Year	Title	Notes
2018	Kumari and the Beast	Sushila Arts Academy
2022	My Name Is Tamizh	One World Theatre
