= Chris Paling =

English radio producer and author (1956–2024)

Christopher David Paling (1956 – 5 February 2024) was a British radio producer, artist, playwright and author of modern fiction.

== Biography ==
Born in 1956 in Derby, Paling studied social sciences at the University of Sussex. He started working as a studio manager for BBC radio in 1981. In the early 1990s he had a Thirty Minute Theatre play called Way Station produced on BBC Radio 4. He wrote more radio plays and later began writing novels.

After the Raid (1995), a wartime study of a shattered mind, was closely followed by Deserters (1996) and Morning All Day (1997). Paling feared The Silent Sentry (1999), about a radio producer who cracks up, might be "the longest resignation letter in history", but he remained a Radio 4 producer. Newton's Swing (2000) was a subtle stateside thriller; The Repentant Morning (2003) is set in London and Spain in 1936; A Town by the Sea (2005) is a departure from his previous style, leading the reader through a strange landscape of unfamiliar people and places. Minding (2007), nominated for the Mind book of the year, was described as "a delicately and intimately drawn portrait".

Paling wrote a series of plays entitled Words and Music, broadcast by BBC Radio 4 in the summer of 2013. In 2017 his book Reading Allowed: True Stories and Curious Incidents from a Provincial Library was published.

Paling was married with two children, and lived in Brighton. He died in Hove on 5 February 2024.

== Bibliography ==
- After the Raid (1995)
- Deserters (1996)
- Morning All Day (1997)
- The Silent Sentry (1999)
- Newton's Swing (2000)
- The Repentant Morning (2003)
- A Town by the Sea (2005)
- Minding (2007)
- Nimrod's Shadow (2010)
- Reading allowed: True stories and Curious Incidents from a Provincial Library (2017)
- A Very Nice Rejection Letter: Diary of a Novelist. Little, Brown Book, 2021. ISBN 9781472134875.
