= Pathani suit =

Traditional costume

Pathani Suit is an ethnic outfit for men in the South Asian culture. It is a dress similar to Salwar kameez. It comprises three garments Kurta (along with tunic), Salwaar (a loosely gathered trouser), and a vest (a waistcoat), which is optional. Pathani suit is popular among men as formal wear and worn on special occasions such as marriages and festivals. It is also called Khan suit and Pashtun suit.

== Evolution ==
The Pathani suit has evolved from a traditional Pashtun dress 'Perahan tunban' or ‘partoog kameez’. Perhan or kameez is similar to the Kurta, a top garment, and Tunban or partoog is a lower garment.

== Characteristics and fashion ==
=== Characteristics ===
The Pathani suit is a three-piece set of a long Kurta, Salwaar, and a vest (a waistcoat). The jacket is an optional choice. Pathani suit goes well with a Nehru jacket. The Kurta and salwar are of the most same color.

=== Fashion ===
Pathani suit is a masculine outfit. Shah Rukh Khan wore a black suit in his iconic role of a don in the movie Raees (film).

The Khan-dress or Pathani suit is a popular dress among the Bollywood heroes.

== See also ==
- Pencil suit
- Shalwar kameez
