= Kavita Daswani =

Indian-American author

Kavita Daswani is an Indian-American author. Her novels, such as Salaam, Paris, deal with the Indian practice of arranged marriages, and features heroines that refuse to go along with tradition.

== Career ==
She grew up in Hong Kong in a Sindhi Hindu family, starting her career at age 17 as a journalist for South China Morning Post. She moved to Los Angeles in 2000.

Her books represent the changes taking place in the diaspora Indian communities, especially regarding institutions such as marriage, the wife's role in families, and increasing opportunities for women. Daswani's combination of humor and culture tension make her books an escapist read.

She was once matched with a man in Nashik, India, who, it turned out, had spent two days in jail for having strippers in his bar.

She has been a fashion correspondent for CNN, CNBC Asia, and Women's Wear Daily, has written for the Los Angeles Times and the International Herald Tribune, among many other publications, and has been the fashion editor for the South China Morning Post in Hong Kong.

== Publications ==
- For Matrimonial Purposes. New York: Putnam. 2003. ISBN 978-0-399-15070-8.
- The Village Bride of Beverly Hills. New York, NY: G.P. Putnam's Sons. 2004. ISBN 978-0-399-15214-6.
- Salaam, Paris. Plume. 2006. ISBN 978-0-452-28746-4.
- Indie Girl. New York, NY: Simon Pulse. 2007. ISBN 978-1-4169-4892-6.
- Lovetorn. HarperTeen. 2012. ISBN 978-0-06-167311-5.
