= Tim Sumner (physicist) =

- Awards: Fellow of the Institute of Physics; Fellow of the Royal Astronomical Society

Academic background
- Education: University of Sussex

Academic work
- Discipline: physics
- Sub-discipline: experimental physics
- Institutions: Imperial College London
- Main interests: particle physics dark matter
- Website: https://www.imperial.ac.uk/people/t.sumner

Timothy J. Sumner is Professor of Experimental Physics at Imperial College London. He is a member of the UK Dark Matter Collaboration, and Sumner's interests cover a wide range of astronomy-related fields, focusing particularly on particle physics.

He received his degree in Physics from Sussex University in 1974, and his DPhil in Experimental Physics from Sussex University, for work carried out jointly with the Institut Laue-Langevin in Grenoble. He joined the Cosmic-Ray and Space Physics group at Imperial College in 1979, and in 1984 became the project manager for flight hardware for the x-ray satellite ROSAT. He received a Group Achievement award from NASA for the project in 1990.

He became involved in the search for the direct demonstration of the existence of galactic dark matter, known as "Weakly Interacting Massive Particles". (WIMP). He is a member of the UK Dark Matter Collaboration (one of four groups around the world looking for WIMPs) and was its spokesperson in the UK for 2002–07. New Scientist described him as "leading the search for galactic dark matter, including axions, at Imperial College London in the UK". He is now Principal Investigator of the ZEPLIN III dark matter experiment. He also leads the ELIXIR proposal for next generation instruments. In addition to ROSAT, he has worked work on the space missions Gravity Probe B, which confirmed several prediction of Einstein's Theory of General Relativity, LISA, a gravitational wave observatory in space, and STEP, a mission to test the equivalence principle in space. He is also associated with GAUGE, a new proposal to the European Space Agency.

He is a Fellow of the Institute of Physics, and of the Royal Astronomical Society, and holds the position of Vice-Chair, COSPAR - Commission H.

== Publications ==
Scopus lists him as having had 132 peer-reviewed publications and cited in 7000. The ones with the highest citation counts are:

- Rowan-Robinson, M.; Mann, R. G.; Oliver, S. J.; Efstathiou, A.; Eaton, N.; Goldschmidt, P.; Mobasher, B.; Serjeant, S. B. G.; Sumner, T. J.; Danese, L.; Elbaz, D.; Franceschini, A.; Egami, E.; Kontizas, M.; Lawrence, A.; McMahon, R.; Norgaard-Nielsen, H. U.; Perez-Fournon, I.; Gonzalez-Serrano, J. I.; "Observations of the Hubble Deep Field with the Infrared Space Observatory - V. Spectral energy distributions; starburst models and star formation history" (1997) Monthly Notices of the Royal Astronomical Society, 289 (2), pp. 490–496. Cited 155 times.
- Smith, P. F.; Arnison, G. T. J.; Homer, G. J.; Lewin, J. D.; Alner, G. J.; Spooner, N. J. C.; Quenby, J. J.; Sumner, T. J.; Bewick, A.; Li, J. P.; Shaul, D.; Ali, T.; Jones, W. G.; Smith, N. J. T.; Davies, G. J.; Lally, C. H.; Van Den Putte, M. J.; Barton, J. C.; Blake, P. R.; "Improved dark matter limits from pulse shape discrimination in a low background sodium iodide detector at the Boulby mine" (1996) Physics Letters, Section B: Nuclear, Elementary Particle and High-Energy Physics, 379 (1-4), pp. 299–308. Cited 103 times.
- Oliver, S.; Rowan-Robinson, M.; Alexander, D. M.; Almaini, O.; Balcells, M.; Baker, A. C.; Barcons, X.; Barden, M.; Bellas-Velidis, I.; Cabrera-Guerra, F.; Carballo, R.; Cesarsky, C. J.; Ciliegi, P.; Clements, D. L.; Crockett, H.; Danese, L.; Dapergolas, A.; Drolias, B.; Eaton, N.; Efstathiou, A.; Egami, E.; Elbaz, D.; Fadda, D.; Fox, M.; Franceschini, A.; Genzel, R.; Goldschmidt, P.; Graham, M.; Gonzalez-Serrano, J. I.; Gonzalez-Solares, E. A.; Granato, G. L.; Gruppioni, C.; Herbstmeier, U.; Héraudeau, Philippe; Joshi, M.; Kontizas, E.; Kontizas, M.; Kotilainen, J. K.; Kunze, D.; La Franca, F.; Lari, C.; Lawrence, A.; Lemke, D.; Linden-Vørnle, M. J. D.; Mann, R. G.; Márquez, I.; Masegosa, J.; Mattila, K.; McMahon, R. G.; Miley, G.; Missoulis, V.; Mobasher, B.; Morel, T.; Nørgaard-Nielsen, H.; Omont, A.; Papadopoulos, P.; Perez-Fournon, I.; Puget, J.-L.; Rigopoulou, D.; Rocca-Volmerange, B.; Serjeant, S.; Silva, L.; Sumner, T.; Surace, C.; Vaisanen, P.; Van Der Werf, P. P.; Verma, A.; Vigroux, L.; Villar-Martin, M.; Willott, C. J.; "The European Large Area ISO Survey - I. Goals, definition and observations" (2000) Monthly Notices of the Royal Astronomical Society, 316 (4), pp. 749–767. Cited 95 times.
- Serjeant, S.; Oliver, S.; Rowan-Robinson, M.; Crockett, H.; Missoulis, V.; Sumner, T.; Gruppioni, C.; Mann, R. G.; Eaton, N.; Elbaz, D.; Clements, D. L.; Baker, A.; Efstathiou, A.; Cesarsky, C.; Danese, L.; Franceschini, A.; Genzel, R.; Lawrence, A.; Lemke, D.; McMahon, R. G.; Miley, G.; Puget, J.-L.; Rocca-Volmerange, B.; "The European Large Area ISO Survey - II. Mid-infrared extragalactic source counts" (2000) Monthly Notices of the Royal Astronomical Society; 316 (4), pp. 768–778. Cited 66 times.
- Rowan-Robinson, M.; Lari, C.; Perez-Fournon, I.; Gonzalez-Solares, E. A.; La Franca, F.; Vaccari, M.; Oliver, S.; Gruppioni, C.; Ciliegi, P.; Héraudeau, Philippe; Serjeant, S.; Efstathiou, A.; Babbedge, T.; Matute, I.; Pozzi, F.; Franceschini, A.; Vaisanen, P.; Afonso-Luis, A.; Alexander, D. M.; Almaini, O.; Baker, A. C.; Basilakos, S.; Barden, M.; Del Burgo, C.; Bellas-Velidis, I.; Cabrera-Guerra, F.; Carballo, R.; Cesarsky, C. J.; Clements, D. L.; Crockett, H.; Danese, L.; Dapergolas, A.; Drolias, B.; Eaton, N.; Egami, E.; Elbaz, D.; Fadda, D.; Fox, M.; Genzel, R.; Goldschmidt, P.; Gonzalez-Serrano, J. I.; Graham, M.; Granato, G. L.; Hatziminaoglou, E.; Herbstmeier, U.; Joshi, M.; Kontizas, E.; Kontizas, M.; Kotilainen, J. K.; Kunze, D.; Lawrence, A.; Lemke, D.; Linden-Vørnle, M. J. D.; Mann, R .G.; Márquez, I.; Masegosa, J.; McMahon, R. G.; Miley, G.; Missoulis, V.; Mobasher, B.; Morel, T.; Nørgaard-Nielsen, H.; Omont, A.; Papadopoulos, P.; Puget, J.-L.; Rigopoulou, D.; Rocca-Volmerange, B.; Sedgwick, N.; Silva, L.; Sumner, T.; Surace, C.; Vila-Vilaro, B.; Van Der Werf, P.; Verma, A.; Vigroux, L.; Villar-Martin, M.; Willott, C. J.; Carramiñana, A.; Mujica, R.; "The European Large-Area ISO Survey (ELAIS): The final band-merged catalogue" (2004) Monthly Notices of the Royal Astronomical Society, 351 (4), pp. 1290–1306. Cited 65 times.
