= Kavita Reddi =

- Born: Delhi, India
- Education: University of Sussex
- Occupations: Journalist, entrepreneur, education advocate
- Children: 3

Kavita Reddi is an Indian journalist, entrepreneur, and education advocate who worked as a senior producer at the BBC, co-founded the AI startup company Voxta, and became the first Asian chair of the University of London board of trustees in 2025.

== Life ==
Reddi was born in Delhi and raised in Kolkata. She moved to the United Kingdom when she was 15 years old. She studied modern history at the University of Sussex.

Reddi joined the BBC as a trainee working at first in radio and later television. She was part of the founding team of BBC Action Network, an online campaigning platform. While working at the BBC, she was exposed to artificial intelligence (AI). Reddi worked at the BBC for fourteen years, including as a senior producer. She spent eight of those years at Newsnight, where she worked on a series of films about bovine spongiform encephalopathy which earned Newsnight its first BAFTA award. She later led a strategic review of digital journalism and how the BBC should approach it.

Reddi returned to India with her husband and three sons. There, she and her husband founded the AI startup company Voxta. Reddi held a strategic role at the company, where she focused on developing ways to implement the technology. It created multilingual voice bots that helped voters, particularly those who were non-literate or non-digital, learn about political parties. By 2017, Voxta had launched ChitChat, a learning and employability platform that taught English to job seekers.

By 2023, Reddi was a member of the board of trustees of the University of London and The Conversation, becoming the first Asian chair of the former in 2025. She has explored how AI can be used in education, with a focus on increasing employability and quality control. In January 2023, Reddi became a non-executive director of the Independent Press Standards Organisation.

== See also ==
- List of British Indians
- List of University of London people
