= Anti-Racist Alliance =

1991–1995 British anti-racist organisation

- Abbreviation: ARA
- Formation: November 1991; 35 years ago
- Founder: Marc Wadsworth
- Dissolved: c. 1995
- Location: United Kingdom

The Anti-Racist Alliance (ARA) was a British anti-racist organisation formed in November 1991. It was established mainly by black activists in the Labour Party.

== Context and formation ==
In the early 1990s, the far right, in particular the British National Party (BNP), was resurgent both electorally and in terms of racial attacks (from 4,383 in 1988 to 7,780 three years later). Anti-Fascist Action, the longest established national anti-fascist organisation in the UK at that time, organised well-attended events in October 1991 – a Unity Carnival in east London attracting 10,000 people and a march through Bethnal Green attracting 4,000 people – prompting other left-wing groups to launch anti-racist and anti-fascist organisations, including ARA in November and the re-launch of the Anti-Nazi League (ANL) by the Socialist Workers Party (SWP) two months later after they had rejected the offer to join with black activists on the steering committee of the ARA instead.

The ARA was formed by Marc Wadsworth, previously active in Labour Party Black Sections. It was the first black-led, broad-based coalition campaigning to stem the rising tide of racism, antisemitism, and support for the extreme right. The ARA was supported by more than 800 organisations including many national black and Jewish organisations. It also had the support of more than 90 MPs and MEPs from across the political spectrum as well as thousands of individuals. The ARA organised campaigns locally and nationally against racist murders, attacks and harassment and rented offices in Lloyd Baker Street at Clerkenwell, London, from Islington council. It won the support of powerful trade unions such as the Transport and General Workers' Union. Its formation was endorsed by the Jewish Socialist Group, the Indian Workers' Association, and the Black Liaison Group.

Marc Wadsworth spoke with John Ross, among others he had worked with on the left, for Socialist Action's support for the new campaign and Ross suggested appointing the left-wing London Labour MP Ken Livingstone as co-chair of the ARA. Wadsworth proposed Cardinal Basil Hume's race advisor Leela Ramdeen as the other co-chair, to engage black faith groups. Some Socialist Action members were put on the executive committee because of their campaigning abilities, including Redmond O'Neill and others later appointed advisers to Livingstone when he was Mayor of London. Palma Black was a National Assistant Secretary and full-time officer. Anne Kane of Socialist Action was also a full-time assistant secretary, but was later fired for gross misconduct. Its vice-chair was Lee Jasper.

The ARA managed to achieve a broad-based coalition of support from across the left, trade unions, and anti-racist organisations, although the anti-fascist magazine Searchlight denounced elements in the ARA leadership [Lee Jasper, its vice-chair] for having links with the antisemite and Nation of Islam leader Louis Farrakhan.

== Development and dissolution ==
Wadsworth and the ARA played a considerable role in the campaign for justice in the wake of the murder of Stephen Lawrence, a black teenager. In May, 1993, Wadsworth introduced Lawrence's parents to Nelson Mandela, who had asked to meet them. The same year, Wadsworth introduced the parents to another South African Nobel Peace Prize winner Archbishop Desmond Tutu, whom he had persuaded to attend a march in Norbury, Croydon, with them against the murder of Afghan migrant Ruhullah Aramesh.

The ARA organised a peaceful anti-racist demonstration of 3,500 people in central London on 16 October 1993, the same day the ANL organised a rival, larger, and more militant demonstration in Welling, where the fascist British National Party had its headquarters Wadsworth dubbed the "nazi bunker", near to the scene of the murder. The rivalry between anti-racist organisations soon alienated the Lawrence family: Doreen Lawrence later wrote that "the various groups that had taken an interest in Stephen's death were tearing each other apart and were in danger of destroying our campaign, which we wanted to keep focused and dignified". Doreen and Neville Lawrence wrote to both the ANL and the ARA to demand that they "stop using Stephen's name".

In 1994 the ARA organised a Trades Union Congress–sponsored "Unite Against Racism" march, attended by 50,000 people.

By 1993 there was considerable tension within the ARA between Wadsworth and Ken Livingstone. On 23 September 1994 the ARA issued a statement claiming that "Ken Livingstone, supported by a faction called Socialist Action and a handful of unprincipled and unrepresentative members of the executive committee, has been waging a relentless campaign to sack [Wadsworth] the national secretary." On 30 September 1994 Livingstone went to the High Court to determine voting rights for the delegates to the ARA's forthcoming annual meeting and an out-of-court settlement was reached. In October 1994 both Livingstone and Wadsworth stepped down. Wadsworth gave way to Kumar Murshid, a future Livingstone mayoral adviser on race. Murshid walked away from the job after turning up at the ARA's offices to find that Wadsworth's staff had changed the locks for security reasons. The ARA collapsed rapidly after unions, including the Transport and General Workers' Union, withdrew support.

By February 1995 the breakaway National Assembly Against Racism (NAAR), had been established, largely by three members of Socialist Action, O'Neill, Jude Woodward, and Anne Kane. Lee Jasper, who became Livingstone's senior mayoral policy adviser on equalities, was its first secretary.

Former Black Sections secretary Jatin Haria became chair of Unison's Black Members Committee before moving from London to Scotland where he founded and led Glasgow Anti-Racist Alliance until 2006, when he turned it into the Glasgow City Council-funded Coalition for Racial Equality and Rights (CRER), of which he is the executive director.

The Anti-Racist Alliance Trust (ARATrust), a registered charity whose founder Tony O'Hara was an ARA activist locally, still exists in Harrow, north west London. Among its company directors are former London Assembly member Navin Shah, who was appointed Commander of the British Empire (CBE) in the 2022 Birthday Honours for political and public service and Arpita Dutt, a British equality and whistleblowing lawyer.

== Approach and legacy ==
The ARA was the only black-led anti-racist coalition in the UK and the largest in Europe. It argued that black self-organisation and labour movement support were key to combating racism in Britain. Its strategy was to focus on making a case for more robust legislation against racial harassment and racist propaganda, including the dog whistle type from right-wing government. In this approach, the ARA contrasted with its main rival, the ANL, which prioritised the fight against fascism rather than state racism.

In November 2021, former Labour Party Black Sections and current Grassroots Black Left leaders Hassan Ahmed and Marc Wadsworth co-founded The Liberation Movement (TLM), as a successor to the ARA. Ahmed, a veteran Nottingham councillor, and Unite trade union activist Deborah Hobson are its co-chairs. TLM held the launch of its Nottingham chapter at the city's Indian Community Centre in August 2022, attended by most of Nottingham's African, Caribbean and Asian councillors, two MPs, Nadia Whittome and Alex Norris, and other community leaders.
