= Marc Wadsworth =

British socialist

- Born: Marc Wadsworth; Birmingham, England
- Occupations: Political activist; journalist
- Title: Founder of the Anti-Racist Alliance
- Political party: Labour (resigned 2003, expelled 2018)

Marc Wadsworth is a British black rights campaigner, broadcast and print journalist and BBC filmmaker and radio producer. He founded the Anti-Racist Alliance in 1991 and, two years later, also helped set up the justice campaign for murdered black teenager Stephen Lawrence. Wadsworth launched an early citizen-journalism news portal, The-Latest.com. In 2008, Wadsworth's reporting triggered the resignation of Mayor of London Boris Johnson's spokesman.

In 2018, Wadsworth was expelled from the Labour Party for bringing the party into disrepute. This decision related to a confrontation on 30 June 2016 between him and Labour MP Ruth Smeeth at the launch of the Chakrabarti Inquiry report into allegations of antisemitism and other forms of racism in the Labour Party.

== Early life ==
Wadsworth's father, George "Busha" Rowe, travelled to Britain from Jamaica in 1944 to serve as ground crew in the Royal Air Force (RAF) in World War II, first at RAF Hunmanby Moor training base, at Filey, North Yorkshire, as part of a contingent of 2,000 volunteers from the Caribbean. Rowe went back to Jamaica in 1946 before returning to Britain as a barber on the SS Empire Windrush two years later. With four other Jamaicans who had also been passengers on the ship, Rowe, aged 24, went to Birmingham, where they got a place to live and factory jobs. Rowe told the Birmingham Gazette newspaper the city had a "colour bar" and was "unfriendly".

Wadsworth's mother is Finnish. A hairdresser in Finland, at the age of 20, she immigrated to England to first work as an au pair for a Jewish dentist in the West Midlands city of Birmingham.

Born in Birmingham, England, Wadsworth spent his first six years in a children's home at Hagley where his mother worked as a domestic helper, and was then in foster care at Balsall Heath, Birmingham, for a further year. He recalls being the only black student at Ottershaw School, a boys' boarding school in Surrey. Initially bullied, he took up amateur boxing at 13, inspired by Muhammad Ali, whose politics he would later describe as Black Pride and Black Power.

== Career ==
=== Activism ===
Wadsworth helped to secure Black Sections (caucuses) within the Labour Party, first tabled in 1983, to further the cause of greater African, Caribbean and Asian political representation. All four of Britain's first minority African, Caribbean and Asian members of parliament of modern times were members.

He then founded the Anti-Racist Alliance (ARA) in 1991, to campaign for justice following the 1993 murder of Stephen Lawrence, introducing Lawrence's parents to South African Nobel Peace Prize winners Nelson Mandela and Archbishop Desmond Tutu. The ARA succeeded in getting human rights lawyer Geoffrey Bindman to draft a bill to make racial harassment and racial violence specific criminal offences, which proposals became law years later.

Wadsworth lost his position as ARA leader in 1994, following disputes with Socialist Action and Ken Livingstone.

He resigned from the Labour Party in 2003 in protest against the Iraq War. He rejoined the party under the leadership of Jeremy Corbyn in May 2016. A month later, he accused Ruth Smeeth, who is Jewish and a sitting Labour MP, of collaborating with The Daily Telegraph. In April 2018, he was expelled from the party by its disciplinary panel, on the grounds of having brought the party into disrepute.

=== Media and academia ===
In January 2006, Wadsworth became founding editor of The-Latest.com, "Britain's first dedicated citizen journalism news portal". In 2008, an article by Wadsworth on The-Latest.com sparked a controversy involving newly elected London mayor Boris Johnson. Johnson's political strategist, James McGrath, said to Wadsworth in an interview that he would be fine if many elderly British African-Caribbean Londoners left the country due to Johnson's policies. Wadsworth published the interview with McGrath on The-Latest.com. McGrath then resigned when Johnson, who was facing criticism for previously referring to black people as "piccaninnies", said it was impossible for McGrath to continue as his political adviser because doubt could be raised about what he meant. Wadsworth said he had he had given McGrath a month to privately clarify his comments prior to publishing the interview. The Press Gazette reported on the controversy under the headline "Citizen journalism takes first UK scalp".

As a journalist, Wadsworth has written for a range of publications, including national newspapers, and has also been involved with community journalism training courses. He twice served on the National Executive Council of the National Union of Journalists. His book, Comrade Sak, a political biography of British Indian Labour and Communist MP Shapurji Saklatvala (1874–1936), was published in 1998 by Peepal Tree Press. A new edition of the book was published in 2020. It was reviewed in a number of news outlets in the UK and India, including The Independent.

Wadsworth has been a reporter and presenter for BBC radio and television and for ITV's Thames News (London), at one point interviewing Margaret Thatcher, whom he recalls walked out when he asked about the vote by her colleagues to effectively oust her from power.

From 2001 to 2012, Wadsworth was a lecturer in journalism at City University London.

In 2012, he was awarded an M.A. in Contemporary British History from King's College London, passing with distinction.

Wadsworth made a documentary film, Divided by Race, United in War and Peace, about his late father's fellow Caribbean World War II veterans and their struggles against colour prejudice and racism. It was a project of The-Latest.com. The BBC remade the film, with Wadsworth as a producer, and, in May 2015, Fighting for King and Empire: Britain’s Caribbean Heroes was broadcast. The film was shown at the Frontline Club in September 2015. In November 2016, the film was repeated by the BBC during Remembrance Sunday week. It has been shown every year since, most recently in June 2022. Wadsworth wrote Guardian newspaper obituaries for two veterans, Sam King in 2016, and Allan Wilmot (2021), both of whom featured in his films.

In May 2022, BBC Radio 4 broadcast a docudrama made by Wadsworth's independent production company entitled The Amazing Life of Olaudah Equiano, about a freed African slave of that name in Britain who was a prominent 18th-century abolitionist at the same time as the better known white politician William Wilberforce. Equiano wrote a best-selling book, The Interesting Narrative of the Life of Olaudah Equiano (1789), as part of his campaigning. Wadsworth's programme was repeated in July 2022, remaining available on BBC Sounds.

Wadsworth was awarded the National Union of Journalists' Gold Badge in March 2023 for his "exceptional contribution to the NUJ over many years".

In March 2016, The-Latest.com identified Wadsworth as a committee member of "Black Momentum" also known as "Momentum Black ConneXions" (MBC), in reference to the pro-Corbyn campaign group Momentum.

=== Comment about Labour MP and expulsion from Labour Party ===
On 30 June 2016, Wadsworth attended the launch of the report of the Chakrabarti Inquiry into allegations of antisemitism and racism in the Labour Party. His group, Momentum Black Connexions, had made a submission to the Inquiry. Wadsworth was also handing out their press release to journalists, about under-representation of Black people in the party and about challenging Labour MPs hostile to Labour leader Jeremy Corbyn. He gave one of the leaflets to Kate McCann, a journalist from The Daily Telegraph newspaper. McCann then handed his press release to someone else. Wadsworth says he asked if she was press and she said no; he asked who she was and she said "Ruth Smeeth Labour MP" – a name he claimed he did not recognise. Wadsworth says he felt her tone was hostile, and that there was "a bit of a commotion", and that as someone with experience of feeling "surrounded by hostile white people", he retreated to the back of the hall.

McCann asked a public question to Corbyn about a "Momentum member" handing out a "leaflet" calling for the deselection of anti-Corbyn MPs, accusing him of taking down the name of one Labour MP. Later Wadsworth, while making a point about the under-representation of non-white racial groups at the launch and in the party, responded to McCann by saying he saw The Telegraph journalist handing a copy of his press release to Labour MP Ruth Smeeth and thus claimed to have seen who was "working hand in hand". Wadsworth says he had felt suspicious of Smeeth politically because of "right-wing journalist McCann" passing her his press release, in what he perceived as a friendly way. A review by the Media Reform Coalition noted that such political concerns were widespread and Wadsworth's comments seemed to be of that type, though often misreported.

At least one person in the audience heckled, including with the words "how dare you" aimed at Wadsworth. Journalist Kevin Schofield, ex senior correspondent at The Sun tabloid, muttered towards Smeeth that it is antisemitism at an antisemitism inquiry. Smeeth walked out, followed by McCann. Later that day Smeeth published an accusation that Wadsworth had verbally attacked her by using a traditional antisemitic slur to accuse her of a media conspiracy, though did not specify the slur or the conspiracy. She wrote that: "it is beyond belief that someone could come to the launch of a report on antisemitism in the Labour Party and espouse such vile conspiracy theories about Jewish people, which were ironically highlighted as such in Ms Chakrabarti's report, while the leader of my own party stood by and did absolutely nothing. People like this have no place in our party or our movement and must be opposed".

Wadsworth responded on the radio that he did not know Smeeth was Jewish. He said he regretted that Smeeth felt offended but that he had been expelled from the Labour Party based solely on media reports. At the time of his expulsion, he had been a member of the Labour Party for one month, having resigned his membership in 2003 in protest against the Iraq War. After receiving a letter from Wadsworth's lawyer, Harriet Wistrich, Labour changed this to a suspension.

On 4 July, Corbyn was asked about Wadsworth in a Parliamentary Select Committee hearing, and called Wadsworth's comments about Smeeth wrong and inappropriate but refused to declare them racist or antisemitic without clarifying the details. On 7 July, The Jewish Chronicle reported quotes from an interview with Chakrabarti indicating she thought Wadsworth had engaged in the kind of behaviour that the Inquiry report was needed to address, and that she had admonished him for this at the time. Wadsworth says she never told him she thought he was being antisemitic. On 8 July, the National Union of Journalists announced that Wadsworth had been elected as chairman of its Black Members Council (BMC), adding that the BMC fully supported him after the media had "slanderously accused him of anti-semitism".

At the first day's hearing by the National Constitutional Committee (NCC) into Wadsworth's future in the Labour Party on 25 April 2018, around 40 Labour MPs and peers accompanied Smeeth, while there was a group of protestors with pro-Wadsworth placards. The Labour MPs Chris Williamson (who afterwards alleged the evidence had been twisted) and Clive Lewis (who alleged afterwards that there was racism against Wadsworth) were witnesses for Wadsworth. On 27 April 2018, the National Constitutional Committee found that two charges of a breach of s.2.1.8 (prejudicial and detrimental conduct) of the Labour Party Rule Book by Wadsworth were proven. The NCC determined that the sanction for this breach of party rules would be expulsion from membership of the Labour Party. His expulsion was welcomed by the Jewish Labour Movement and the president of the Board of Deputies of British Jews. Two days later, Jewish Voice for Labour, calling Wadsworth a "leading Black antiracist activist", welcomed him to their Annual General Meeting and passed a resolution that he should be reinstated.

In February 2019, after party officials refused to speak to him further, Wadsworth began legal action against the Labour Party for race discrimination against him under the Equality Act 2010 and for breach of contract. It was reported later that this action had been dropped because the Labour Party would not have been bound by any court decision and, if Wadsworth had lost, the costs would have been ruinous for him.

In a BBC Question Time "leaders special" shortly before the 2019 general election, an audience member, later identified as a South African "Tory activist" in Hull called Ryan Jacobs, singled out the footage of Wadsworth while accusing Corbyn of a disgraceful and terrifying lack of support for Jewish women, claiming it showed Smeeth leaving in tears. Wadsworth had been taking action against news publishers for claiming he had heckled or abused Smeeth, including The Jewish Chronicle, which added caveats to several stories after intervention by the Independent Press Standards Organisation. Wadsworth said: "It's affected me, my health, family and friends in a terrible way. I’ve faced awful racist abuse on social media and been threatened on public transport."

In March 2021, The Jewish Chronicle falsely stated that Wadsworth was part of a group allegedly planning to locate and intimidate Jewish Labour members, printing a prominent picture of Wadsworth. Wadsworth sued for defamation in the article, which The Jewish Chronicle accepted was wholly untrue. The judge stated: "This was a serious mistake for the Jewish Chronicle to have made", and the Chronicle published an apology for their error and agreed to pay damages and costs.
