= Labour Party Black Sections =

Black caucus

- Abbreviation: LPBS
- Successor: Black Socialist Society
- Formation: 6 October 1983; 43 years ago
- Dissolved: 1993; 33 years ago
- Location: United Kingdom
- Parent organization: Labour Party

Labour Party Black Sections (LPBS), commonly known as Black Sections, was a caucus made up of Labour Party members of African, Caribbean, and Asian descent from 1983 to 1993. Its aims were campaigning against racism, demanded political representation of black and Asian members and establishing a group in the party.

== Formation ==
Since the 1960s, the Labour Party has relied on votes from Britain's large African, Caribbean, and Asian ("politically black") communities, its demographically most loyal supporters, in urban areas. Over time, black people stood in local council elections, and even as candidates for Parliament. However, during the 1970s and early 1980s, these candidates were often put by Labour in seats where they stood very little chance of winning.

The Labour Party Black Sections debate emerged in the context of African, Caribbean, and Asian voting patterns gaining prominence from 1974. The call for Black Sections among black Labour Party activists came from their realisation of the significance of black votes, particularly in areas with a high concentration of African, Caribbean and Asian people. Black members active in the Labour Party argued for greater representation in return for the electoral support of their communities.

The English youth riots/uprisings that occurred at the start of the 1980s in Brixton, Birmingham, Leeds, Manchester, Liverpool and elsewhere acted as a warning to a British society that was indifferent or hostile to the demands of disenfranchised and disadvantaged black people. These urban disturbances provided black Labour activists with greater political leverage in their arguments. While the rise of the Labour municipal left wing, of prominent figures including Ken Livingstone in local government particularly in London, and with the base for the left in the Labour Party in the councils, this created the opportunity to place the issue of black representation on the political agenda.

Parallel organisations within the trade unions, such as the Nalgo Black Workers Group, the Black Trade Union Solidarity Movement, and Black Media Workers' Association, the latter two funded by the Livingstone-led Greater London Council, were set up prior to Labour Party Black Sections. There were two main approaches to the formation of Labour Party Black Sections. For supporters of the organisation, the rationale for its existence was the fact that although for decades more than 80% of black people who went to the polls had voted Labour, this was not reflected in the party's policies, priorities, hierarchy or among its political representatives. Supporters argued Black Sections would act as a transmission belt to get more African, Caribbean, and Asian people into Labour membership and actively involved in decision-making and representative roles in the party. Black Sections challenged the party's historical record of neglect of black community concerns, including its passing in government of racist immigration laws. The Black Section's argument was, if its demands were agreed by Labour, the organisation would provide the party with the electoral support it needed in key inner-city seats. By organising as a section (caucus) within the party, African, Caribbean and Asian Labour Party members hoped to create a critical mass of black people required to change the party so that it could take account of their aims of greater political representation and the adoption of their Black Agenda, brought out by the Black Sections in 1988.

Responding to the growing weight of black demands, and the creation of new opportunities to voice them, white progressive Labour Party members backed their black fellow members to help them establish unofficial Black Sections. These were modelled on the party's already existing Women's Section and Young Socialists. Dozens of supportive CLPs (CLPs) sent motions supporting Black Sections to the party's conference each year. In 1981, Labour Party Black Sections were first mooted after Britain's inner-city uprisings, to further African Caribbean and Asian representation within the Labour Party. Among its founding members were Diane Abbott, then a Westminster City councillor; Paul Boateng, a lawyer and the only black member of the Greater London Council; its first chair Russell Profitt, a Lewisham, south London, councillor; Billy Poh, a Vietnamese activist in Abbott's Westminster North CLP (where Black Sections had its first base); Nirmal Roy (who became a Camden, north London, councillor in 1986); and Marc Wadsworth, who became chair in 1985. Initially, the Labour leader Neil Kinnock was said to have welcomed the idea. In 1983, a composite motion (from motions several CLPs had submitted of Black Sections–supporting resolutions) setting out a framework for implementation by the National Executive Committee of the Labour Party (NEC) was debated at the Labour Party conference and then sent to the NEC for further consideration. After this, the NEC set up a "Positive Discrimination" working party to investigate the demand for Black Sections, which, recommended that they be made official, following its wide-ranging consultation among CLPs, trade unions and socialist societies throughout the country, which favoured Black Sections, by a four-to-one majority. Positive discrimination were the preferred words of the left-wing Campaign for Labour Party Democracy, which had helped draft early Black Sections resolutions and circulated them among its extensive network of CLPs and trade union branches. Labour deputy leader Roy Hattersley, who was MP for Birmingham Sparkbrook, a parliamentary constituency with a large Asian party membership that he feared would replace him if they were allowed to get organised, opposed Black Sections. When Birmingham Sparkbrook CLP secretary Kevin Scally and Birmingham City councillor Amir Khan set up Sparkbrook Black Section, Hattersley had them expelled from Labour. But a national Black Sections "Justice for Khan and Scally" campaign, led by Clare Short and supported by their Transport and General Workers' Union, then Britain's largest trade union and to which the pair belonged, got them reinstated at the Labour conference, against the wishes of Kinnock and Hattersley.

Despite opposition from the Labour and trade union leaderships and a hostile news media, within a few years Black Sections had 35 branches, several of them in London and the Midlands, most sending "unofficial" delegates to their CLP party management and executive committees. In the 1986 council elections, on the back of the success of Black Sections, more than 200 African Caribbean and Asian Labour candidates were elected across the country, a three-fold increase on their previous numbers and four black council leaders elected. The latter included Black Sections vice-chair Linda Bellos, who was leader of Lambeth council from 1986 to 1988; Black Sections supporter and leader of Brent council, Merle Amory. In 1983, Amory was elected deputy leader.

Black Section supporters around the country, frustrated by the lack of a single black MP in Parliament established an increasing number of Black Sections in CLPs and demanded change. This put pressure on the Labour leadership to tackle poor African Caribbean and Asian representation in the party and to focus its attention on policies that black communities wanted. The Black Sections also called for "all-black shortlists" – powered quotas to ensure black prospective candidates were selected and then elected to Parliament, the same as all-women shortlists, which the Black Sections was the first to advocate, were used to redress the gender representational imbalance. Campaigners lobbied for the party's constitution to be amended to ensure Black Sections had representation in the party's decision-making bodies at every level, including on the NEC, as was already the case for the trade unions, women, youth, and socialist societies.

== History ==
"Black" is a political concept. It is used to include all racially minorities oppressed because of the colour of their skin. Each geographical area, therefore, is likely to reflect its own "black" communities. In most areas this will inevitably mean people of African-Caribbean or Asian descent. However, in Haringey, for example, Cypriots have chosen to be, and are, involved in local Black Sections.

— Labour Party Black Sections, 1985

In July 1984, the first national Black Sections conference was purposely held at Digbeth Hall, in Hattersley's Birmingham Sparkbrook constituency. Hattersley was invited but refused the invitation. More than 300 mainly African Caribbean delegates attended. At the 1984 Labour Party autumn annual conference, 23 resolutions supporting Black Sections were tabled. At every national party conference between 1983 and 1989, Black Sections activists managed to get resolutions via CLPs all over Britain to amend Labour's constitution and advocate formally recognising Black Sections. But after it was agreed the first ones in 1983 should be remitted to the NEC without a vote, they were subsequently heavily defeated, after passionate debates, despite growing support from some trade unions with their block votes in 1985, including the National Union of Public Employees, the largest health workers' union, and the National Union of Mineworkers. By 1986, more and more trade unions, particularly public sector ones under pressure from their large numbers of black members, agreed Black Sections had a positive effect in building up black union membership. Indeed, some of them even set up their own black structures.

Many inner-city CLPs had Black Sections, despite Labour's refusal to make them official: the Black Sections 1986 Annual Conference in Nottingham reported that more than 30 CLPs had unofficial Black Sections. In the face of opposition from Labour, Black Sections members operated as if their group was legitimate, often with the support of their CLPs and branches (wards). Consequently, the relationship between the Black Sections and the Labour leadership was marked by public conflict and constant tension that generated bad publicity for the party.

Regardless, Black Sections achieved successes including four of its black supporters being elected London council leaders — Merle Amory (Brent), Black Sections vice-chair Linda Bellos (Lambeth), Bernie Grant (Haringey), and Dorman Long (Brent, after Amory). Additionally, four Black Sections members became MPs, and Bill Morris was elected as the first black trade union general secretary. On top of that, black self-organised groups were formed in trade unions and by probation officers, teachers and students and even by police officers, who formed the National Black Police Association. The Trades Union Congress (TUC) created places on its general council and executive for black representatives, as the Black Sections had demanded.

Paul Boateng, Diane Abbott, Bernie Grant, Russell Profitt and Keith Vaz stopped acting as Black Sections activists when they were selected for safe or winnable seats in the 1980s. In the 1987 general election, Boateng, Abbott, Grant, and Vaz were elected as MPs from 12 African, Caribbean and Asian prospective Parliamentary candidates. The four newly elected MPs were the outcome of the strategy of focusing on internal selections to get more black and Asian MPs into Parliament. However Black Sections chair Sharon Atkin, a left-wing Lambeth councillor, was controversially deselected as the Nottingham East prospective Labour parliamentary candidate the same year, at the insistence of Kinnock. Responding to an anti-Labour black nationalist heckler, Bini Brown, Atkin had said, at a Black Sections public meeting in Birmingham, she would not want to represent "a Kinnock racist Labour party". Four Birmingham Labour MPs, led by Hattersley (the others were Robin Corbett, Terry Davis and Denis Howell), signed a letter, which they issued to the media beforehand, saying the meeting should not take place. It resulted in Bernie Grant not attending. The Black Sections issued a statement condemning the letter, stating there should be no apartheid-style pass laws preventing the free movement of black people in the UK.

Until 1988, the dominant position within the Black Sections was one of demanding no less than Labour constitutional recognition as an official section of the party, to achieve parity with the existing Women and Youth Sections. This shifted after the 1987 general election to one of the Black Sections being prepared to consider proposals from the Labour leadership if they met Black Sections' general black self-organisation criteria. In 1988, Black Sections published the Black Agenda document after being urged by Race Today, Race & Class of Ambalavaner Sivanandan, and other activists in African Caribbean and Asian communities, to state their policies.

Although Black Sections were established in CLPs around the country, they were not endorsed by the Labour leadership. The legitimate calls for fair representation made by black communities – whose electoral support was given overwhelmingly to Labour – were resisted by the party leadership of Kinnock and Hattersley, who wanted to defeat a rising left-wing rank and file that the right-wing Conservative Party–supporting tabloid national newspapers denounced as the loony left. By 1987, Black Sections' founding principle of autonomous organisation within Labour was in doubt. In the face of the party's NEC backing a resolution authored by the right-wing MP Gwyneth Dunwoody, which threatened disciplinary action against future "separatist" activity, after the Black Sections arguably most successful conference, held in Nottingham, where its vice-chair Hassan Ahmed ran the largest Black Section outside London, the organisation was forced to go on the defensive. Six black prospective parliamentary candidates, who were Black Sections members, agreed with Labour not to subscribe to "statements of Black Sections policy" (the Black Agenda), which were different from the general party programme.

The main reason we want to see Black Sections recognised is because we believe the only way that appropriate strategies for overcoming racism will be devised, is when we as Black people come together and decide on effective anti-racist policies which we can take to a wider political audience. As victims of racism, we have a right to be in the forefront of the anti-racist struggle.

— Labour Party Black Sections, 1988

Clare Short, the left-wing Birmingham Ladywood MP, was one of the few white politicians, along with Tony Benn and Ken Livingstone, to stand by Black Sections throughout its almost decade-long campaign. Despite the support for Black Sections, which, by then existed all over the labour movement, Labour still refused to recognise the organisation or and give it an official place in developing the party's race policies.

In 1989, Martha Osamor, deputy leader of Haringey council in north London, and a Black Sections vice-chair, was chosen as the prospective parliamentary candidate by the Vauxhall CLP. Again, Kinnock stepped in to block the selection of Martha Osamor who he considered to be too left-wing to represent the party in Parliament. Kate Hoey was imposed as the candidate by the NEC instead. Osamor's daughter Kate Osamor went on to become an MP for Edmonton in 2015, and Martha Osamor was made a peer and put in the House of Lords by Labour leader Jeremy Corbyn in 2018.

The internal focus depoliticised the aims of the Black Sections. In October 1990, at the annual general meeting, Bernie Grant pointed out that the general political mood was one of retreat, the left was weak, and his view was the Black Sections' corresponding weakness meant it was time to be "pragmatic" and assess what would be achievable in such a climate. This stance, by one of its most prominent advocates, indicated that Black Sections was about to lower its horizons on the very existence of the organisation and the official recognition it would pursue. Some Black Sections activists suspected that Grant and his fellow Black Labour prospective parliamentary candidates were now less keen to rock the Labour boat now they were about to become MPs. Despite this scepticism, the official demand for Black Sections was replaced by the organisation's leadership accepting the compromise of a hybrid Black Socialist Society because they believed their original demand was no longer feasible. In 1990, the view which gained ascendancy was that Black Sections should continue to operate as a pressure group under its current constitution, actively develop a Black Socialist Society within the Labour Party and seek to win political leadership of it. To end its longest-running internal dispute of the 1980s, Labour finally agreed to change the party's constitution to embrace the Black Socialist Society along the lines put forward by the Black Sections.

During the 1990 conference a compromise was reached. Clarence Lusane writes:

Composite 8, as it was called, stated that the NEC would (a) recognize formally and support Black members' right to organize together for effective participation and representation; b) make provisions for the representation of Black members at all levels of the party; and c) adopt the working party's proposal on Black members' organization within the party that were presented to the NEC on 26 July 1989, namely, the setting up of a single affiliated organization for members of African, Caribbean, and Asian descent, with local and regional groups and direct representation on the NEC.

The outcome of this resolution was the creation of the Black Socialist Society.

In 1991, at the Black Sections' annual general meeting, it was acknowledged by national chair Mike Wongsam, summing up on behalf of the NEC, that enabling the Black Socialist Society would mean developing an organisation that would replace Labour Party Black Sections' influence within the Labour Party. Black Sections were disbanded and the Black Socialist Society was formed as a compromise between the party leadership and the organisation. This led to a split among Black Sections activists, with a minority rejecting a Black Socialist Society that they claimed would be half inside and half outside of the party, like the Labour head office-controlled National Organisation of Labour Students. The dissidents unsuccessfully urged the organisation to stick to its demand for Black Sections, which would be inside the party, like the women and youth sections.

== Legacy ==
Many of the Black Sections leaders remained Labour Party members. In 1991, they formed the grassroots Anti-Racist Alliance, which helped set up the Stephen Lawrence campaign for justice.

In 1993, the Black Socialist Society was founded. Black Sections members joined to help set up local branches. The Black Socialist Society was supported by trade unions and Labour's Walworth Road headquarters, which ran its annual conferences. Key members of the Black Socialist Society's first national committee were members of the Black Sections: Kingsley Abrams, Palma Black, Marc Wadsworth, and Jatin Haria, who was elected to the key role of secretary. An outcome of the Black Sections redefinition of autonomous Labour organisation was to move black politics from the periphery and into the heart of municipal and parliamentary politics. The organisation was defunct for more than a decade after the connivance with the antagonistic Labour headquarters of its trade union chair Gloria Mills and treasurer Bob Purkiss.

The Black Socialist Society was reconstituted into BAME Labour in 2007, after meetings Labour MP Keith Vaz and Chuka Umunna had with Labour Party leader Tony Blair. This kept Vaz on Labour's NEC as its representative before he stepped down in 2019 as an MP after being involved in a scandal.

In 2017, Grassroots Black Left was set up in Nottingham by Black Sections veterans Hassan Ahmed and Marc Wadsworth. The organisation had a parliamentary launch the following year attended by Labour Party MPs including Clive Lewis, Naz Shah, Mohammad Yasin and Chris Williamson.
