= Artists' Union England =

- Abbreviation: AUE
- Founded: May 2014; 12 years ago
- Headquarters: Old Bakery, Carlow Street, London, NW1 7LH
- Location: England
- Members: ▲2,344 (2026)
- National Chair: Zita Holbourne; Loraine Monk
- Affiliations: TUC; GFTU
- Website: artistsunionengland.org.uk

Artists' Union England is a trade union in England for workers in the visual and applied arts. Founded in 2014, the union has over 2,000 members and is affiliated with the Trades Union Congress (TUC).

== History ==
The founding committee (Note: Founding members included Angela Kennedy, Sally Sheinman, Katriona Beales, Theresa Easton, Chris Cudlip, Vanessa Maurice-Williams, Hayley Hare, Margareta Kern, Mary Vettise, Bridget Harvey, Donna Cheshire and Linda Sgoluppi.) first met in September 2013 and the union was launched in May 2014. Within a year, the union had over 500 members. It was certified in 2016, with most of the administrative fees being covered by donations including from the Scottish Artists Union, the Musicians Union and the General Federation of Trade Unions. By 2016, the union reported over 600 members.

In 2026, the AUE proposed a successful motion to the TUC to back the Boycott, Divestment, Sanctions movement. The motion was seconded by Unison and was supported by delegates from Unite the Union, the National Education Union, the Communication Workers Union, and the Public and Commercial Services Union.

== National Chairs ==
The AUE has had the following National Chairs:

- 2014: Katriona Beales
- 2015–2017: Theresa Easton
- 2018–2020: Martin Sundram and Zita Holbourne
- 2021–2023: Martin Sundram
- 2023–present: Zita Holbourne and Loraine Monk
