= BAME Labour =

UK political organization

- Black, Asian and Minority Ethnic Labour
- Predecessor: Black Socialist Society
- Formation: March 2007; 19 years ago
- Headquarters: Westminster, London, England
- Location: United Kingdom
- Members: 731 (2017)
- Chair: Ahmad Shahzad
- Affiliations: Labour Party
- Website: bamelabour.org

BAME Labour (Black, Asian and Minority Ethnic Labour), formerly the Black Socialist Society until 2007, is a socialist society affiliated to the Labour Party made up of black, Asian and ethnic minority Labour Party supporters.

== History ==
After black socialist societies were defunct for over a decade, the Black Socialist Society was reconstituted into BAME Labour in 2007. Ahmad Shahzad was elected its first chair and the name was changed with Chuka Umunna, BAME Labour Executive Member at the time, writing that the rationale was that "'black' is no longer used as a political term as widely as it once was" and that "different people have different understandings of the nature and meaning of 'socialism': some associate the word with notions of wholesale nationalization, a centrally controlled economy etc.; others more loosely associate the word with general notions of social justice and generally 'what a Labour government does'."

Since March 2007, Keith Vaz, MP for Leicester East, has represented BAME Labour. Vaz is its directly elected representative on the Labour Party's ruling and governing National Executive Committee (NEC).

== Premise ==
The mission statement of BAME Labour states that it "seeks to empower ethnic minority members within the Labour Party and campaigns for greater representation of ethnic minority communities in public life". Through encouraging increased participation in the political process BAME Labour empowers its members. It is a democratically constituted membership organisation which is affiliated to the Labour Party but is politically and organisationally independent.

The organisation evolved, from Labour Party Black Sections to the Black Socialist Society to BAME Labour. Similar to Socialist Societies, it has an autonomous status, a separate constitution, joining fee, processes and admits people who are not Labour Party members. Whereas, like a Section, it is granted a fully independent NEC representative – regardless of how low its membership drops – and it is entirely administered by Labour Party staff.

A £5 fee provides members with a two-year membership. BAME Labour's elected officers including the Chair, Secretary and Treasurer are not allowed access to the membership data, finances or the running of the organisation's elections. This lies solely in the power of Labour Party staff. It holds a guaranteed place on Labour's National Executive Committee (NEC) and three places on the party's National Policy Forum (NPF), matching and mirroring the NEC place and NPF representation shared by the other 15 socialist societies.

== Elections ==
The Labour Party Rule Book states that: "The NEC shall comprise one member elected by the BAME Labour. This member to be elected once the individual membership of the socialist society has reached 2,500." Candidates are required 20 supporting nominations from individual members, which must be collected in the form of paper-based signatures. Photocopied or scanned signatures are not allowed. Candidates who receive the support of a socialist society or trade union need fewer signatures, however, the same rules about how they are collected apply.

In October 2010, BAME Labour had 3,363 members (the third largest affiliate, behind Fabian Society and Labour Students) and issued that many ballot papers in that year's leadership election. At the time, Labour Party membership was 177,559. The then-general secretary of the Fabian Society Sunder Katwala noted the low turnout in the BAME Labour election. The turnout amongst BAME Labour's membership was 11.7 per cent. Out of 3363 ballots distributed, just 392 votes were cast, and of these 137 were spoilt ballots. Just 255 votes for leadership candidates were registered with David Miliband receiving 78 per cent of the vote.

In October 2012, the society was taken to the High Court over the question of whether Keith Vaz was eligible since it was alleged that court documents indicate that Vaz had not paid his annual subscription of £1 to BAME Labour when he stood for re-election to the NEC in 2009. Vaz won the case despite a court case between Elcena Jeffers, the former secretary of BAME Labour, Labour officials successfully argued that Jeffers's failure to pay her annual subscription disqualified her from seeking re-election.

In August 2017, despite the Labour Party membership being 570,000 with an estimated 72,000 black, Asian and minority ethnic members, membership of BAME Labour has fallen to 731 members of whom 520 voted in the BAME Labour elections. This was in contravention of the 2,500 needed as per the stipulations of the Labour Party Rule Book. In August 2017, Vaz retained his place on the NEC on behalf of BAME Labour from challenger, Asghar Khan, a Leeds councillor, postal worker and trade union representative, who had the backing of several of the largest trade unions, including Unite the Union, GMB, Transport Salaried Staffs' Association and Communication Workers Union, and several videos in support of Khan's candidacy were made by Momentum. It was reported by the New Statesman that BAME Labour members "felt shut out by an archaic election process, which they say favoured an establishment within the society."

== Labour Party Democracy Review ==
In January 2018, for the first track of the Labour Party Democracy Review, Momentum proposed submissions to update the way the NEC's BAME representative is chosen, with a one member, one vote election replacing the current system where a small party group decides the post. Under the Momentum's proposals, all black or minority ethnic members of the party would automatically become part of BAME Labour and have one member, one voting rights in electing their NEC representative. BAME Labour would also have an independent organisation, with its committee having direct access to its own membership list and centrally-funded finances, and the ability to organise its own campaigns and events independently.

In July 2018, for the third track of the Labour Party Democracy Review, proposals were submitted for reforming BAME Labour. The proposed changes would result in all Labour Party members who self-identify as ethnic minorities automatically becoming BAME Labour members, a national BAME committee being elected using one member, one vote and a higher percentage of reserved BAME seats in areas with high ethnic minority populations.

== Endorsements ==
In October 2018, BAME Labour endorsed Vaughan Gething for the Welsh Labour Party leadership election.
