= National Assembly Against Racism =

1995–2003 British organisation

The National Assembly Against Racism (NAAR) was a British anti-racist and anti-fascist group.

NAAR was a predominantly black-led national anti-racist grouping, formed after the acrimonious collapse of the Anti-Racist Alliance. It first met on 4 February 1995, when it launched the Anti-Racist Charter for the New Millennium, endorsed by Bill Morris of the Transport and General Workers Union and Labour MPs Diane Abbott and Keith Vaz.

Lee Jasper, race relations adviser to Ken Livingstone, the mayor of London, was NAAR's chair. Socialist Action played a key role within it. NAAR's student arm was Student Assembly Against Racism, organised in 1995.

By 2003, its co-chairs were black Labour MP Diane Abbott and councillor Kumar Murshid, a close ally of Livingstone. It had active local groups in Birmingham, Coventry, Lewisham, Manchester and Sheffield.

NAAR merged with the Anti-Nazi League into the Socialist Workers Party (UK)-led Unite Against Fascism (UAF) in 2003, Jasper joining UAF's first steering committee and NAAR's Sabby Dhalu acting as joint secretary with SWP/ANL's Weyman Bennett.
