= Simon Fletcher (political advisor) =

UK Labour party political strategist

Simon Fletcher is a prominent figure on the left of the British Labour Party. He is a left wing political strategist and campaigner who has held senior positions working for socialist politicians including the Mayor of London Ken Livingstone and leader of the opposition, Jeremy Corbyn.

== Biography ==
Fletcher was born in Oxfordshire and earned a first-class degree at the City of London Polytechnic (now London Guildhall University).

== Career ==
In 1993, Fletcher was elected as a councillor at a by-election for the St Pancras ward on Camden London Borough Council, after the resignation of the incumbent Mary Helsdon.

Fletcher worked in the office of Tony Benn. He ran the successful campaigns to win the London Mayoralty (2000), the Labour leadership (2015) and the Scottish Labour leadership (2017). Fletcher also ran Livingstone's campaign to be the Labour candidate for Mayor of London in 2010. He worked in the office of three successive Labour Party leaders, having been the trade union liaison manager for Ed Miliband, and then chief of staff for Jeremy Corbyn, and advisor for planning election campaigns to Sir Keir Starmer.

A close aide to Ken Livingstone, Fletcher was the first elected Mayor of London's chief of staff, heading Livingstone's office for two terms. During this time he is reported to have been a member of the Trotskyist group Socialist Action, the successor organisation to the International Marxist Group. Fletcher is reported to have negotiated Livingstone's early 're-entry' to the Labour Party after Livingstone had stood as an independent in the 2000 mayoral election. An Evening Standard profile of Fletcher and other Livingstone mayoral advisers reported that when Livingstone travelled abroad he left Fletcher in charge, and quoted the London Assembly member Toby Harris as saying that Fletcher was the Mayor's 'surrogate brain.' The report stated that his 'abilities are highly regarded, even by those who do not warm to him.' The same newspaper in 2007 described him as 'the Mayor's super-bright, ultra-loyal chief of staff.'

Fletcher headed a Labour Party Tory-attack team in London in the 2010 general election. In a 2014 Total Politics interview, the then Conservative Mayor of London, Boris Johnson, defined a 'Fletcheresque' approach to campaigning, drawing attention to Fletcher's transition from Livingstone's chief of staff to Miliband aide: "I think lots of Labour voters are rally disheartened with Miliband" he says. "People don’t know what he stands for. He’s neither fish, flesh nor fowl. What’s the point of Miliband? He’s doing this terrible thing, this Fletcheresque [another reference to Simon Fletcher, Livingstone’s former chief of staff] nonsense of making these boutique offers to people."

Having been the director of Jeremy Corbyn's campaign to be Labour Party leader Fletcher was then campaign director for the successful Scottish Labour leadership bid by Richard Leonard MSP. In 2020 he was appointed Strategic Campaigns Adviser for Keir Starmer's Labour leadership election campaign, but it was announced Fletcher would leave after the 2021 local elections.

== Personal life ==
According to the Independent, Fletcher is divorced. The Huffington Post reports that he lives in Gateshead with his partner Marie Nixon, a former member of Sunderland's Kenickie band.
