= Kate Hudson (activist) =

British activist and academic (born 1958)

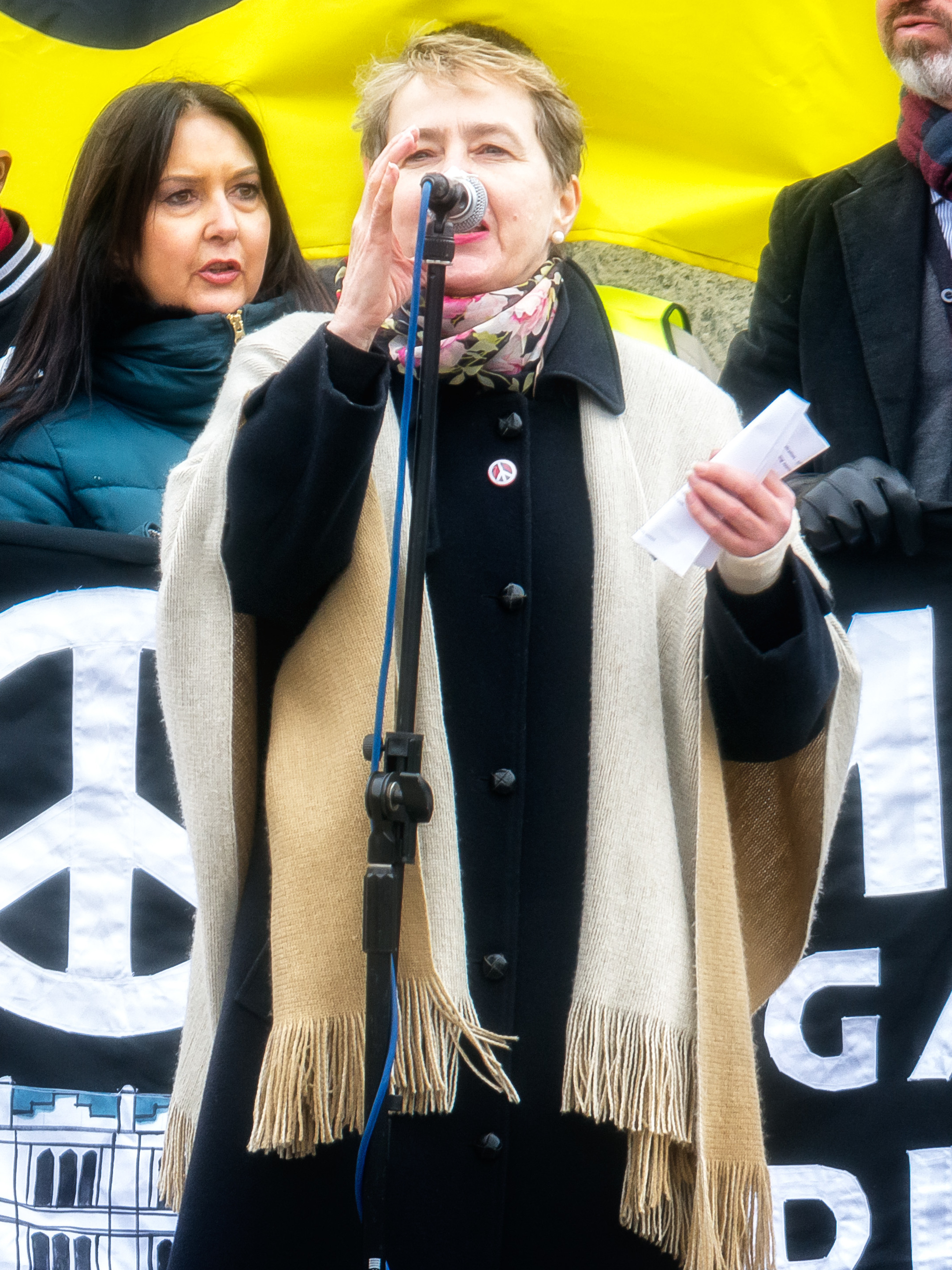
- Hudson in 2016
- Born: Katharine Jane Hudson; 1958 (age 67–68); Leeds, West Riding of Yorkshire, England
- Occupations: Activist; academic; General Secretary of the Campaign for Nuclear Disarmament
- Known for: Political activism
- Spouse: Andrew Burgin (m. 2012)

Katharine Jane Hudson (born 1958) is a British left-wing political activist and academic who is a vice-president of the Campaign for Nuclear Disarmament (CND) and co-national secretary of Left Unity. She served as chair of CND from 2003 to 2010, general secretary from 2010 to 2024, and has been an officer of the Stop the War Coalition since 2002. She is also a board member of the International Peace Bureau.

== Life and career ==
She was head of social and policy studies at London South Bank University from September 2003 to 2010 and subsequently a visiting research fellow. She was founding editor of the journal Contemporary Politics, serves on the editorial board of Debatte: Journal of Contemporary Central and Eastern Europe and is a board member of Declassified UK. She is also a member of the editorial board of the radical left journal, Transform, founded in spring 2017, and linked to the European transform!network, the political foundation of the European Left Party.

Hudson was a member of the Communist Party of Britain until 2011. In 2012, she joined the Respect Party following the party's Bradford West by-election victory. Hudson was selected as the Respect candidate for the 2012 Manchester Central by-election but subsequently stood down in protest at "unacceptable and un-retracted statements about the nature of rape" made by the party's only MP, George Galloway. She resigned as a member of Respect on 15 October 2012.

In March 2013, she joined film director Ken Loach and Gilbert Achcar, professor of development studies at School of Oriental and African Studies (SOAS), University of London, in a call for a new left-wing party. Hudson has written that over 2,000 gave their support to the campaign within three days of its launch. The campaign founded the Left Unity party in November 2013, and Hudson was elected National Secretary of the organisation at its first policy conference on 29 March 2014. Serving as national secretary for three years, the maximum term allowed, she was elected as the party's Media Officer in March 2017, subsequently serving in other posts.

== Personal life ==
In the 1990s, Kate Hudson met and married Redmond O'Neill (1954–2009), an activist in Socialist Action and adviser to Ken Livingstone. In 2012, Hudson married Andrew Burgin, an officer of the Stop the War Coalition and secretary of the national anti-cuts organisation, the Coalition of Resistance. Hudson is also active in the Venezuela Solidarity Campaign.

== Selected works ==
- CND – Now More Than Ever: The Story of a Peace Movement, Vision Paperbacks, ISBN 1-904132-69-3 (2005)
- Breaking the South Slav Dream: The Rise and Fall of Yugoslavia, Pluto Press, ISBN 0-7453-1881-9 (2003)
- European Communism Since 1989, Palgrave Macmillan, ISBN 0-333-77342-X (2000)
- The New European Left: a socialism for the twenty-first century?, Palgrave Macmillan, ISBN 978-0230248762 (2012)
- Free Movement and Beyond: agenda setting for Brexit Britain (ed), Public Reading Rooms, ISBN 978-0995535220 (2017)
- CND at 60 – Britain's Most Enduring Mass Movement, Public Reading Rooms, ISBN 978-0995535244 (2018)

== See also ==
- List of peace activists

Party political offices
New political party	Co-National Secretary of Left Unity; 2023–	Incumbent
Non-profit organization positions
Preceded by Carol Naughton	Chair of CND; 2003-2010	Succeeded by Dave Webb
Preceded by Gary Lefley	General Secretary of CND; 2010-2024	Incumbent
