= Atma Singh (politician) =

British politician (born 1960)

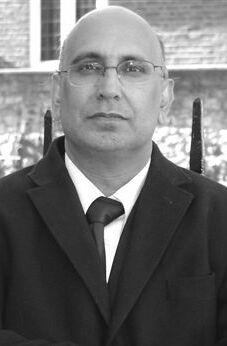
- Outside Westminster in London on 1 March 2010

Personal details
- Born: 1960 (age 65–66) Punjab, India
- Party: Labour
- Children: Two children Satantar and Dilveer Singh Kang
- Parent(s): Tara Singh and Pritam Kaur (Kang family)
- Profession: Politician
- Website: Official Atma Singh website

Atma Singh (born 1960) is a British Indian former political figure.

From June 2001 until July 2007, he was the Policy Advisor to the Mayor of London on Asian Affairs in the Greater London Authority, under Mayor of London Ken Livingstone. He was a member of Socialist Action from 1981 to 1994, but continued to work closely with its members for another decade.

== Biography ==
Atma Singh was born in India in 1960 and came to the UK in 1967. He was brought up and did his schooling in Yorkshire. He was the first person from his secondary school to go to any Oxbridge colleges after gaining entry to study law in Queens' College, Cambridge. He became involved in political activities. He moved to the University of Newcastle upon Tyne in 1983, where he graduated with a BA Hons degree in Politics. One of his tutors was future minister Mo Mowlam. He moved from Yorkshire in 1989 to work in London. After two years commuting, he decided to move to London.

For six years, he was the Policy Advisor to the former Mayor of London, Ken Livingstone, on Asian Affairs, until an acrimonious disagreement resulted in his dismissal. Singh claimed the fallout was over Livingstone's relationship with controversial Palestinian clerics.
