= Zita Holbourne =

British human rights campaigner and activist

- Born: 1960s
- Education: London College of Printing; Watford School of Art
- Occupations: Writer, performance poet, visual artist
- Known for: Community and human rights campaigner and activist
- Website: www.zitaholbourne.com

Zita Holbourne FRSA (born 1960s) is a British community and human rights campaigner and activist, and a multi-disciplinary artist, creating work as a writer, performance poet and visual artist. As a trade unionist, she is National Vice President of the Public and Commercial Services Union (PCS) in the UK, and chairs its national equality committee and women's committee, and as joint national Chair of Artists' Union England she also leads on equality. She sits on the European Public Services Union National and European Administration Committee. She co-founded with Lee Jasper the organisation BARAC (Black Activists Rising Against the Cuts), which campaigns against the impact of austerity on black communities.

== Background ==
Holbourne studied art and graphic design at the London College of Printing and Watford School of Art. She produces artwork that ranges from oil paintings on canvas to digital works and graphic design.

Through activism and art, she campaigns for equality, justice and human rights. In her creative work she also highlights the impact of climate change on the global South. She is the co-founder and National Chair of Black Activists Rising Against Cuts (BARAC) UK, a founding member of Movement Against Xenophobia, BME Lawyers for Grenfell and BAME Lawyers for Justice and has played a prominent role in campaigning against injustices ensuing from the Windrush scandal.

In 2012, she won the Role Model award at the National Diversity Awards.

In 2018, in recognition of her work in arts and culture and as a campaigner for race equality, she was invited to become part of the UNESCO Coalition of Artists for the General History of Africa. She founded the Roots, Culture and Identity arts collective, which showcases the art of predominantly young black, Asian and migrant artists, and she is the author of the 2017 book Striving for Equality, Freedom and Justice: Embracing Roots, Culture and Identity: A Collection of Poetry, published by Hansib. Holbourne has contributed work to anthologies including New Daughters of Africa (2019), edited by Margaret Busby, Encounters with James Baldwin: Celebrating 100 Years, Here We Stand, Women Changing the World, and Encounters with Jane Austen: Celebrating 250 Years.

Publications for which she has written include The Guardian, the Morning Star and The Voice.

On the International Day for the Remembrance of the Slave Trade and its Abolition in August 2020, Holbourne delivered the Dorothy Kuya Memorial Lecture at the International Slavery Museum in Liverpool.

In 2021, she wrote a "Manifesto for Cultural Workers" that was launched by Public Services International (PSI), addressing the impacts of the COVID-19 pandemic, public policy and systemic exploitation on workers in the arts and culture sector. She was curator of the Roots, Culture, Identity virtual art exhibition hosted by the TUC Race Relations Committee in 2021.

Holbourne has been the organiser of a long-running petition calling on the Home Office to end "mass deportations" to Jamaica.

== Other recognition and honours ==
Holbourne is a Fellow of the Royal Society of Arts, and in 2023 received an Honorary Fellowship from the University of Wales Trinity Saint David.
