= Joint Policy Committee =

The Joint Policy Committee of the British Labour Party was part of the policy-making system of the party, set up by leader Tony Blair in 1997 as part of the Partnership in Power process.

It has strategic oversight of policy development by overseeing the rolling policy making process of Partnership in Power. It acts as a steering group for the National Policy Forum, and is a joint committee made up of National Executive Committee, parliamentary and National Policy Forum representatives, chaired by the leader of the party.
