= Sally Sheinman =

American visual, digital and installation artist

- Born: May 16, 1949 (age 77); Watertown, New York, U.S.
- Education: Hunter College; University at Albany, SUNY
- Known for: Painting

Sally Sheinman (born May 16, 1949), is an American painter, digital artist, and installation artist. She is based in the UK.

== Early life and education ==
Sheinman was born in Watertown, New York where she grew up on a farm. She worked in finance on Wall Street and in London and for a time was the company secretary of the Mocatta Metals Corporation. She studied painting at the State University of New York at Albany and later studied art at Hunter College in New York where her tutors included Tony Smith and Robert Morris.

Since the 1980s, Sheinman has lived in Britain, where she works in Northampton.

== Career ==
Sheinman's works have included an interactive touring exhibition in association with the University of Hertfordshire called the Wishing Ceremony. The Wishing Ceremony opened in six locations in Leicester City in 2005 and then traveled to the University of Hertfordshire and mac in Birmingham in 2006. The Wishing Ceremony is also available on-line as part of an interactive website.

Her exhibitions include

- Artnaos at five different NHS hospitals in London and the Midlands, and The Collection art gallery, Lincoln, 2007
- Sacred Vessels at Rugby Art Gallery and Museum in Rugby, 2003,
- Days at The Gallery in Stratford-upon-Avon, 2002,
- The Naming Room at Roadmender, Northampton, 2001,
- Fragments of Time and Thought at Liberty, London, 2000,
- Artjongg at the University College Northampton,
- Between the Lines at Ikon Touring, Birmingham 1997,
- New Work at City Gallery, Leicester, 1995,

Commissions include Non-Essential Signage for the Arts Council England, Announcements for South and East Belfast Trust, Artkacina for firstsite in Colchester (2006) and ARTDNA for the Towner Gallery in Eastbourne (2008). In 2010 Sheinman finished Let's Celebrate - a commission inspired by the London 2012 Olympic and Paralympic games. The work toured to five National Trust properties across the East Midlands throughout 2010 and comprised over 250 painted miniature sculptures.

Sheinman worked on a project titled Being Human, created in collaboration with researchers at the Wellcome Trust Sanger Institute in Cambridge and funded by the National Trust, Mottisfont Abbey. The work, a 200-foot-long paper sculpture made of 25,000 pieces of hand-painted gold Japanese rice-paper representing the number of genes in the human genome, was displayed at Mottisfont Abbey in the autumn of 2011. A subsequent on-going project, What Makes You/You, which began in 2013, is a web-based digital and interactive series of artworks based on responses received from members of the public. What Makes You/You was selected in The Lumen Prize Exhibition longlist of 100 works and shortlist of 28 works, and was named the winner of the Founder's Prize. In 2018, Sheinman received a grant from the Arts Council National Lottery Project, to be an Artist in Residence at C2C Social Action, a Northamptonshire-based charity supporting offenders in the criminal justice system.

Sheinman is also involved with Artists Interaction and Representation (AIR) and in 2012 was elected as Chair of this organisation which represents over 16,000 artists within the UK.

== Awards and grants ==
- 2006 - Arts Council of England, Artnaos
- 2008 - Arts Council of England, Hopian Symbols
- 2009 - Arts Council of England, Let's Celebrate
- 2014 - Lumen Prize - Winner, Founder's Prize
- 2018-2019 - Arts Council National Lottery Project Grants, Artists in Residence at C2C Social Action
