= National Executive Committee of the Labour Party (UK) =

Governing body of the UK Labour Party

National Executive Committee
- Abbreviation: NEC
- Formation: 27 February 1900; 126 years ago
- Headquarters: London, England
- Chair: Cllr Peter Wheeler
- Vice-chair: Ian Murray
- Parent organisation: Labour Party

The National Executive Committee (NEC) is the governing body of the UK Labour Party, setting the overall strategic direction of the party and policy development. Its composition has changed over the years, and includes representatives of affiliated trade unions, the Parliamentary Labour Party, constituency Labour parties (CLP), and socialist societies, as well as ex officio members such as the party Leader and Deputy Leader and several of their appointees.

== History ==
During the 1980s, the NEC had a major role in policy-making and was often at the heart of disputes over party policy.

In 1997, under Tony Blair's new party leadership, the General Secretary Tom Sawyer enacted the Partnership in Power reforms. This rebalanced the NEC's membership, including by reducing trade union membership to a minority for the first time in its history. The reforms also introduced new seats: two for local government, three for the Parliamentary Party, three for the (Shadow) Cabinet, and one for the European Parliamentary Labour Party (EPLP). Until these reforms, Member of Parliament could stand for CLP section seats on the NEC, but thereafter MPs and MEPs could not stand in this section. Moreover, under Blair, the committee's role declined. Its former policy development function is now largely carried out by the National Policy Forum. One of its committees has disciplinary powers including the ability to expel members of the party who have brought it into disrepute or to readmit previously expelled members. However, the NEC remains the administrative authority of the party.

In 2007, a new seat on the NEC was made for the Black Socialist Society, now known as BAME Labour.

In 2016, two new seats, one each for Scottish Labour and Welsh Labour, were added.

The 2017 Conference saw the creation of four additional NEC seats: one in the trade union section and three in the CLP section. Although the additional union seat was elected at Conference, the extra CLP seats were not elected until January 2018.

In November 2020, following the Brexit withdrawal agreement ending UK representation within the European Parliament and ending the European Parliamentary Labour Party, the single seat on the NEC for the EPLP leader was replaced by a new disability representative.

The Labour History Archive and Study Centre at the People's History Museum in Manchester has the full run of the minutes of the National Executive Committee in their collection.

== Organisation ==
=== NEC Officers ===
As of July 2026, the Officers of the NEC are:

- Leader of the Labour Party: Andy Burnham MP
- Deputy Leader of the Labour Party: Lucy Powell MP
- Chair of the National Executive Committee: Shabana Mahmood MP
- Vice-Chair of the National Executive Committee: Cllr Peter Wheeler
- Treasurer: Mike Payne
- Chair of the Organisation Committee: Tom Williams
- Chair of the Disputes Panel: Gurinder Singh Josan MP
- NEC co-convenor of the Joint Policy Committee (JPC): Keiran O’Neill
- Chair of the Equalities Committee: Abdi Duale
- Chair of the National Policy Forum (when a member of the NEC): Ellie Reeves MP

=== Joint Policy Committee ===
The Joint Policy Committee (JPC) has strategic oversight of policy development in the party through overseeing the rolling programme of Partnership in Power. The JPC acts as the steering group for the National Policy Forum. It is therefore a joint committee made up of NEC, Government and National Policy Forum representatives.

=== NEC sub-committees ===
The following are sub-committees of the NEC:

==== Equalities Committee ====
The Equalities Committee responsibilities and roles include:

- Women's recruitment, retention and participation in the party in elected office and the development of women's forums at local level
- Black, Asian and ethnic minority recruitment, retention and participation in the party
- Lesbian, gay, bisexual, and transgender representation and participation within the party
- Disability access and increased representation and participation of members with disabilities
- Considering effective party responses to Employment Framework Directive based on Article 13 (Treaty on European Union) and the European Union Action Programme to Combat Discrimination
- Responsibility for driving the Party's equality agenda and the development of an inclusive organisation at all levels
- Link with Organisation Committee and Young Labour Co-ordinating Committee on issues of age discrimination
- Biannual women's forum
- Biannual ethnic minorities forum

==== Business Board ====
The Business Board is responsible for overseeing the business functions of the organisation including the management of the finances.

==== Audit, Risk Management and Compliance Committee ====
The Audit, Risk Management and Compliance Committee has responsibility for audit and compliance oversight, and is accountable for internal audit procedures providing a systematic approach to risk management in all of the party's activities. The committee ensures that the Labour Party's financial activities are within the law, and that an effective system of internal control is maintained.

==== Organisation Sub-Committee ====
The Organisation Sub Committee is a sub-committee of the NEC (generally known as Org Sub) and is responsible for party rules and constitution; ensuring parties are operating effectively throughout the country to the highest standards and has overall responsibility for membership, investigations, selections, Conferences, electoral law, boundaries strategy and internal elections.

===== Complaints & Disciplinary Sub-committee =====
The NEC Complaints & Disciplinary Sub-committee is a sub-committee of the NEC Organisation Sub-committee which hears membership appeals; re-admission applications; party disputes and conciliation; minor investigations and local government appeals where referred to the NEC. It operates in a quasi-judicial fashion, conducting hearings and interviews around the country where necessary.

== Membership ==
Excluding ex officio members, NEC members are elected by their respective constituencies, and each serve a two-year term. As of 2023, the NEC has 39 members, as follows:

- 3: Ex officio positions: Leader and Deputy Leader of the Labour Party, and Party Treasurer
- 13: Trade Unions representatives
- 6: MPs
  - 3 Frontbench MPs (nominated by the Cabinet)
  - 3 Backbench MPs (elected by the members of the Parliamentary Labour Party)
- 2: Local Government representatives (Note: Elected by and from councillors, directly elected mayors, and/or Police and Crime Commissioners)
- 9: from CLPs (Note: nominated by CLPs, elected by all party members on a one member one vote basis)
- 1: from the Socialist and Co-operative Societies
- 2: Scottish and Welsh Labour
- 3: 1 BAME Labour, 1 Young Labour, 1 Disabled members

The General Secretary of the Labour Party acts as the non-voting secretary to the NEC, the Chief Whip and the PLP Chair also attend as non-voting members.

== Current members ==
As of 17 July 2026
Leader of the Labour Party

- Andy Burnham MP

Deputy Leader of the Labour Party

- Lucy Powell MP

Treasurer

- Ruth Brady

House of Commons Front Bench

- Shabana Mahmood MP
- Bridget Phillipson MP
- Jonathan Reynolds MP

Young Labour Representative

- Elsie Greenwood

Disabled Members Representative

- Emily Pomroy-Smith

BAME Representative

- Carol Sewell

Division I – Trade Unions

- David Agbley (Unite)
- Sonya Davis (GMB)
- Isabelle Gutierrez (Musicians' Union)
- Linda Hobson (UNISON)
- Jane Jones (Usdaw)
- Nicola Jukes (TSSA)
- Kieran Maxwell (ASLEF)
- Ian Murray (FBU)
- Keiran O'Neill (GMB)
- Karen Rose (CWU)
- Aimy Saunders (UNISON)
- Mary Williams (Unite)
- Tom Williams (Usdaw)

Division II – Socialist Societies

- Anu Prashar (Socialist Societies)

Division III – Constituency Labour Parties

- Andrew Achilleos
- Cat Arnold
- Jessica Barnard
- Gemma Bolton
- Angie Davies
- Abdi Duale
- Peter Mason
- Kerry Postlewhite
- Jane Thomas

Division IV – Labour Councillors

- Cllr Claire Holland
- Cllr Peter Wheeler

Division V – Parliamentary Labour Party

- Luke Akehurst MP
- Gurinder Singh Josan MP
- Melanie Onn MP

Scottish Labour and Welsh Labour

- Jackie Baillie MSP (Deputy Leader of the Scottish Labour Party)
- Ann Jones (Welsh Labour Representative)

In addition, the General Secretary (Joe Fortune), the PLP Chief Whip (Anneliese Midgley MP), and PLP Chair (Jessica Morden MP) attend ex officio without a vote.

== Chair of the National Executive Committee ==
The chair of the party is elected by the NEC from among its own members, and holds office for a calendar year, chairing both NEC meetings and national party conferences.

The name of this post has become confused since 2001 when Labour Party leader Tony Blair appointed Charles Clarke to the courtesy position of Chair of the Labour Party without the NEC or the national conference authorising such a position. The office's name remains "chair of the party" in the Labour Party Constitution, but elsewhere the party presents the position as "Chair of the NEC". Prior to 2001 the position was called "Chair of the Labour Party", and before that "Chairman of the Labour Party".

=== List of chairs of the Labour Party National Executive Committee ===
Chairmen of the Annual Conference of the Labour Representation Committee

1900: William Charles Steadman MP
1901: John Hodge
1902: William John Davis
1903: Joseph Nicholas Bell
1904: John Hodge
1905: Arthur Henderson MP

Chairmen of the National Executive Committee of the Labour Representation Committee

1900: William Charles Steadman MP
1901: Allan Gee
1902: Richard Bell MP
1903: John Hodge
1904: David J. Shackleton
1905: Arthur Henderson MP

Chairmen of the Annual Conference of the Labour Party

1906: Arthur Henderson MP
1907: J. J. Stephenson
1908: Walter Hudson MP
1909: John Robert Clynes MP
1910: Keir Hardie MP
1911: William Cornforth Robinson
1912: Ben Turner
1913: George Henry Roberts MP
1914: Tom Fox
1915: No conference held
1916: William Crawford Anderson MP
1917: George Wardle MP (acting)
1917–18: W. F. Purdy
1918–19: John McGurk
1919–20: William Harold Hutchinson
1920–21: Alexander Gordon Cameron
1921–22: Fred Jowett MP
1922–23: Sidney Webb MP
1923–24: Ramsay MacDonald MP
1924–25: Charlie Cramp
1925–26: Robert Williams
1926–27: Frederick Roberts MP
1927–28: George Lansbury MP
1928–29: Herbert Morrison MP
1929–30: Susan Lawrence MP
1930–31: Stanley Hirst
1931–32: George Lathan MP
1932–33: Joseph Compton
1933–34: Walter R. Smith
1934–35: William Albert Robinson
1935–36: Jennie Adamson
1936–37: Hugh Dalton MP
1937–39: George Dallas (Note: no conference was held in 1938)
1939–40: Barbara Ayrton-Gould
1940–41: James Walker MP
1941–42: Walter Henry Green MP
1942–43: Alfred Dobbs
1943–44: George Ridley MP
1944–45: Ellen Wilkinson MP
1945–46: Harold Laski
1946–47: Philip Noel-Baker MP
1947–48: Emmanuel Shinwell MP
1948–49: Jim Griffiths MP
1949–50: Sam Watson
1950–51: Alice Bacon MP
1951–52: Harry Earnshaw
1952–53: Arthur Greenwood MP
1953–54: Wilfrid Burke MP
1954–55: Edith Summerskill MP
1955–56: Edwin Gooch MP
1956–57: Margaret Herbison MP
1957–58: Tom Driberg
1958–59: Barbara Castle MP
1959–60: George Brinham
1960–61: Richard Crossman MP
1961–62: Harold Wilson MP
1962–63: Dai Davies
1963–64: Anthony Greenwood MP
1964–65: Ray Gunter MP
1965–66: Walter Padley MP
1966–67: John McFarlane Boyd
1967–68: Jennie Lee MP
1968–69: Eirene White MP
1969–70: Arthur Skeffington MP
1970–71: Ian Mikardo MP
1971–72: Tony Benn MP
1972–73: William Simpson
1973–74: James Callaghan MP
1974–75: Fred Mulley MP
1975–76: Tom Bradley MP
1976–77: John Chalmers
1977–78: Joan Lestor MP
1978–79: Frank Allaun MP
1979–80: Lena Jeger
1980–81: Alex Kitson
1981–82: Judith Hart MP
1982–83: Sam McCluskie
1983–84: Eric Heffer MP
1984–85: Alan Hadden
1985–86: Neville Hough
1986–87: Syd Tierney
1987–88: Neil Kinnock MP
1988–89: Dennis Skinner MP
1989–90: Jo Richardson MP
1990–91: Tom Sawyer
1991–92: John Evans MP
1992–93: Tony Clarke
1993–94: David Blunkett MP
1994–95: Gordon Colling
1995–96: Diana Jeuda
1996–97: Robin Cook MP
1997–98: Richard Rosser
1998–99: Brenda Etchells
1999–00: Vernon Hince
2000–01: Maggie Jones
2001–02: Margaret Wall
2002–03: Diana Holland
2003–04: Mary Turner
2004–05: Ian McCartney MP
2005–06: Jeremy Beecham
2006–07: Michael Griffiths
2007–08: Dianne Hayter
2008–09: Cath Speight
2009–10: Ann Black
2010–11: Norma Stephenson
2011–12: Michael Cashman MEP
2012–13: Harriet Yeo
2013–14: Angela Eagle MP
2014–15: Jim Kennedy
2015–16: Paddy Lillis
2016–17: Glenis Willmott MEP
2017–18: Andy Kerr
2018–19: Wendy Nichols
2019–20: Andi Fox
2020–21: Margaret Beckett MP
2021–22: Cllr Alice Perry
2022–23: Johanna Baxter
2023–24: James Asser
2024–25: Ellie Reeves MP
2025–26: Shabana Mahmood MP
2026-27: Cllr Peter Wheeler

== See also ==
- Conservative Party Board
- Liberal Democrats Federal Board
