= Black Socialist Society =

British socialist society affiliated to the Labour Party

- Predecessor: Labour Party Black Sections
- Successor: BAME Labour
- Formation: 1993; 33 years ago
- Dissolved: 2007; 19 years ago
- Location: United Kingdom
- Affiliations: Labour Party

The Black Socialist Society was a British socialist society affiliated to the Labour Party. It was made up of black Labour supporters from 1993 to 2007. It later became BAME Labour.
