= Socialist Action (UK) =

Trotskyist group in the United Kingdom

- Founded: 1982
- Preceded by: International Marxist Group
- Headquarters: London
- Membership: 30 (2016)
- Ideology: Trotskyism; Market socialism
- Political position: Far-left
- International affiliation: None

Website
- www.socialistaction.net

Socialist Action, originally known as the Socialist League, is a small Trotskyist political group in the United Kingdom.

Founded in December 1982, as a successor to the International Marxist Group, the group Socialist Action was an entryist organisation, attempting to work within other organisations, with members using code names and not revealing their affiliation. It maintains a website but no publicly visible formal organisation.

The organisation was linked with the 2000–2008 Greater London mayoral administrations of Ken Livingstone, although Livingstone was never a member. Four of Livingstone's key advisers were Socialist Action members; all made the "top 25" in the Evening Standard's 2007 list of the most influential people in London. Its members have maintained leading positions in many campaigns - the National Abortion Campaign, the Campaign for Nuclear Disarmament, National Assembly Against Racism and various coalitions against the wars against Iraq, Afghanistan and Yugoslavia, for example. As a result, Socialist Action exert an influence beyond that which might be expected from so small a grouping.

== History ==
The group was founded in 1982 when the International Marxist Group entered the Labour Party and changed its name to the Socialist League. It became generally known by the name of its publication, Socialist Action, which first appeared on 16 March 1983. The group organised around the newspaper, but also had a bookshop The Other Bookshop, in Islington, as well as a printing press, Lithoprint Ltd, in Stoke Newington, which it still owns.

In September 1983, assuming that the Labour Party's actions against the Militant group would extend to Socialist Action as well, the group decided to disappear from public view, closing down the bookshop, and taking other measures to guarantee invisibility. Members were assigned pen names, and after the closure of the bookshop met in an assortment of pubs. The group adopted an entryist strategy "to protect members from any potential Militant-style purge".

Also in 1983, the group's heavy involvement with the youth wing of the Campaign for Nuclear Disarmament (along with the group Socialist Organiser) led to the leadership of the section being suspended. The group retained a fraction within the CND as late as 1986.

By the mid-1980s, the group had around 500 members. Working with increasing secrecy in the Labour Party, often under the auspices of other apparently independent organisations, its members became supporters of Ken Livingstone and the Campaign Group of Labour MPs. Its success in Trade Unions was limited, with the group's fraction in the National Union of Mineworkers having 13 members in June 1986, which fell to five by September.

The aftermath of the 1984–1985 United Kingdom miners' strike led to John Ross to argue to reorient around individuals like Arthur Scargill, Tony Benn, and Ken Livingstone. This led to a minority to leave the League in 1986 and merge with the Socialist Group to form the International Socialist Group, whom began publishing Socialist Outlook. In 1988 Brian Grogan split to create the Communist League (UK, 1988). This league was a part of the Pathfinder tendency, a group led by the Socialist Workers Party (United States).

The remainder of the group drew pessimistic conclusions from the fall of the Stalinist regimes in the Soviet Union and Eastern Europe. It continued to define itself as a Trotskyist group. It considers the Soviet model to have been preferable to capitalism for the working class, but it has always criticised that model for its bureaucratic and undemocratic features, accepting Trotsky's definition of the USSR as a degenerated workers' state. Socialist Action participated in the 1989 and 1990 Fourth International Youth Summer Camps but suffered another split after the 1991 World Congress. Small groups of Socialist Action members regularly resigned and joined the International Group, and its successor, the International Socialist Group, between the original split in 1985 and the 1991. At the 1991 World Congress of the Fourth International, the group was given equal status within the International with the International Socialist Group. At the 1995 world congress the ISG replaced Socialist Action as the British section.

In 1997, along with Labour Party activist Ken Livingstone, SA backed Morning Star chief executive Mary Rosser and committee member Kumar Murshid in a battle for control over the newspaper.

In 2001, SA stopped publishing its journal, also named Socialist Action, but continued to organise as a faction, for instance as the Student Broad Left. In 2003, it played a major role in backing Kate Hudson's leadership of the Campaign for Nuclear Disarmament (CND), and a long-term CND officer alleged that, along with the Communist Party of Britain, it was becoming dominant in the organisation, in order to exert influence over the Stop The War Coalition. Some of its activists played leading roles in organising the 2004 European Social Forum.

Socialist Action was heavily involved in the publication and editorial control of Socialist Campaign Group News.

=== Ken Livingstone ===
The group's association with Ken Livingstone goes back to 1985, when the group's leader, John Ross, became Livingstone's economic advisor. In the mid-1980s the group adopted Livingstone as something of a figurehead, regarding Arthur Scargill and Tony Benn as spent forces, and according to Atma Singh was "instrumental" in getting Livingstone elected to the Labour Party's National Executive Committee in 1987 and 1988. Socialist Action was still operating in the Labour Party by the 1990s, but had become localised around Livingstone.

Running as an independent candidate for Mayor in 2000, Livingstone's decision to appoint members of Socialist Action to his administration during his first term drew criticism in the media. When Livingstone re-appointed his administration in 2004, members of Socialist Action were described as his "stooges". In a January 2008 article that was subsequently spun as revealing a "secret Marxist cell" at the GLA, Atma Singh, a former member of SA who had been Policy Advisor on Asian Affairs to Ken Livingstone from 2001 to 2007, detailed some of the history and activities of Socialist Action, accusing members of planning a "bourgeois democratic revolution", trying to accumulate power and manipulating the Mayor. A subsequent episode of the Channel 4 documentary series Dispatches, "The Court of Ken", presented by journalist Martin Bright, featured Singh and others making these same allegations. The advisers named, including chief of staff Simon Fletcher, deputy chief of staff and director of public affairs and transport Redmond O'Neill, economic adviser John Ross, green adviser Mark Watts and culture adviser Jude Woodward, refused to state whether or not they are still active as Socialist Action, and a spokesman for Livingstone responded to the charges by referring to Singh's removal from his job for "failure to discharge his duties" and calling Singh "an embittered ex-employee". Livingstone referred to the claims in the Dispatches documentary as a hatchet job. Later, Livingstone said “Almost all of my advisers had been involved in Socialist Action... It was the only rational left-wing group you could engage with. They used to produce my socialist economic policies. It was not a secret group.”

In 2007 Livingstone changed the GLA rules so that his eight key advisers, four associated with SA (including John Ross and the late Redmond O'Neill), who as temporary appointments would not normally have been entitled to severance pay, received an average of £200,000 each.

=== After 2007 ===
Socialist Action also participated in Respect - The Unity Coalition after the 2007 split in that party. Several of its supporters became members of the party and one served as its national treasurer. In 2009, its members played leading roles in the Palestine Solidarity Campaign. In 2012, rival Trotskyist group Alliance for Workers' Liberty say that it dominated Unite Against Fascism as a junior partner to the Socialist Workers Party.

Its members continue to publish occasional pamphlets and leaflets. It relaunched its website, with an analysis of the world economic situation following the Great Recession. The group applies the Marxist concept of the organic composition of capital to argue that the US economy is in a long-term decline and in turn the non-capitalist character of China is helping it to emerge from the crisis.

==== Jeremy Corbyn ====
Following Jeremy Corbyn's election as Labour Party leader and Leader of the Opposition in 2015, many of its leading members became active in the party leadership. Former member Atma Singh said that Socialist Action were building "a real power base" around Corbyn and journalist Paul Mason said that "its members became highly influential in the leader’s office." Simon Fletcher - who according to Singh had been on the SA central committee - was appointed Corbyn's Chief of Staff (having previously been appointed Labour's trade union liaison manager by Ed Miliband in 2013) while John Ross has been linked to Corbyn's inner circle. Fletcher resigned from his role in early 2017.

==== Russia and China ====
In 2020 and 2022, focusing on its leading member John Ross, Paul Mason described Socialist Action as among "Western apologists" for "totalitarian China", "committed to whitewashing China's authoritarian form of capitalism".

During the 2022 Russian invasion of Ukraine, Mason reported that "three hours after Russia declared war on Ukraine" its Twitter account "hailed the Russian troops as 'defenders and peacekeepers'."

Preceded by International Marxist Group	British Section of the Fourth International; 1982–1989	Succeeded by International Socialist Group
