= Lee Jasper =

British politician and activist (born 1958)

Senior Policy Adviser and Director of Policing and Equalities to the Mayor of London
- In office June 2004 – 4 March 2008
- Mayor of London: Ken Livingstone

Personal details
- Born: 4 November 1958 (age 67) Oldham, Lancashire, England
- Party: Labour (2004–2012, 2014–present)
- Children: 9
- Education: Manchester Polytechnic
- Occupation: Political adviser and activist
- Known for: Senior Policy adviser and Director of Policing and Equalities to Mayor of London Ken Livingstone, 2004–2008; Political activism
- Website: leejasper.blogspot.com

Lee Jasper (born 4 November 1958) is a British politician and activist. He served as Senior Policy Advisor on Equalities to the then Mayor of London Ken Livingstone until he resigned on 4 March 2008. More recently, Jasper stood as the Respect Party candidate for the Croydon North by-election in November 2012, and is a race relations activist.

== Early life and career ==
Jasper was born on 4 November 1958 in Oldham, Lancashire, where he was brought up by his British-born mother, who is of Irish and Sierra-Leonean descent. His father is Jamaican. He described his surroundings as a child as dominated by "crude racism". He started out running a market stall, selling second-hand clothes. He returned to education as a mature student and gained a degree in social sciences from Manchester Polytechnic.

== Career ==
He moved to London in 1985, where he became closely involved in the Notting Hill Carnival, becoming chair of the Mangrove Community Association. He was elected Secretary of the Notting Hill Carnival in 1987. It was at this time he met Brian Paddick, who described him as a "street hustler" whose group would "sell bits of the pavement they didn't own", ultimately overcoming opposition from the local police chief seeking to enforce the local authority's licenses. Jasper ran to be director of the carnival in 1989, but did not get elected.

Over the next decade, Jasper became a race and human rights activist, sitting on various committees and groups such as the Inner London Education Authority. He was founder of Operation Trident and the Royal Commonwealth Society. He was a witness at the Stephen Lawrence inquiry as a representative of the 1990 Trust. He was also a group member of the Lawrence campaign.

Jasper was once involved in a community policing partnership with Metropolitan Police, providing "£500-a-day police racism awareness courses" on community issues. This role ceased in 1995, following the Brixton riots, during which Jasper has been criticised by some for making "very, very angry speech" prior to the violence. Jasper was one of the main officers of the National Assembly Against Racism and has since been praised for developing the "cautious rapprochement" between communities and the police in London.

Jasper was criticised by Conservative politician Shaun Bailey as "representing the old school of black politics", and was accused of playing the "race card" too often. Operation Black Vote coordinator Simon Woolley, however, described Jasper as "one of the nation's key black figures".

Jasper was the Chief Political Commentator for The Voice newspaper during the 2010 election.

Jasper was selected as Respect's candidate for the Croydon North by-election on 29 November 2012. As he gained only 2.9% of the vote, he lost his deposit. Jasper had at the time been a registered member of the Labour Party and was removed upon running as a Respect candidate. Jasper also later admitted using Twitter bots during his campaign to try and sway the vote.

In November 2016, it emerged that Jasper had rejoined the Labour Party to support the leadership of Jeremy Corbyn. He was again suspended from the party in 2018 over allegedly homophobic tweets.

== Activism ==
Jasper became a member of the Coalition of Resistance (COR) anti-cuts campaign. He was also a political adviser to the 1990 Trust and a board member of Lambeth Police Consultative Group, but resigned as Chair of Brixton Splash though remained a member of its board.

Along with Zita Holbourne, he co-founded the anti-austerity organisation BARAC (Black Activists Rising Against the Cuts).

In July 2011, Jasper in jest suggested that there were physical similarities between the extremist Anders Behring Breivik and Mayor of London Boris Johnson.

Writing for Inside Croydon in 2015, Jasper called for the black community to take responsibility for the increase in teenage and community violence.

He has been a high-profile campaigner about deaths in police custody, raising the cases of Sarah Reed and Mohamud Hassan, with his activism having been covered by the Financial Times.

He is today Vice Chair of BAME Lawyers 4 Justice campaigned to end the deportation of ex-offenders and UK residents deemed to Jamaican nationals.

He is a Strategic Adviser to the national black men's African and Caribbean network Black Men 4 Change.

=== Senior political advisor ===
Lee Jasper was appointed as Director for Policing and Equalities during Ken Livingstone's 2004–2008 term as Mayor of London. He was responsible for the development, enactment and promotion of equalities policies for the Greater London Authority (GLA) and had corporate responsibility for the development and delivery of anti discriminatory policies aimed at ensuring equality in employment practices and service delivery. He was also directly responsible for advising the Mayor on policing issues. Jasper was one of four senior political advisers whose salary was raised to £111,000 a year in 2004; higher than that of the mayor himself.

Due to his role in the Greater London Authority, he played an important part at the European Social Forum hosted by the GLA in London in 2004. This caused some controversy, as there was disruption at the anti-racist session of the Forum. His strong criticisms of the disruption were in turn condemned by a small number of hard left-wing groups as stifling dissent.

One journalist described how Jasper was "intensely disliked" by a more senior political advisor in City Hall. During his time, he worked with Livingstone to host the Caribbean Showcase alternative carnival event at Hyde Park, drawing some opposition from carnival figures who felt he was trying to "take over" the event.

During his time as a Policy Advisor, Jasper defended Sir Ian Blair in the aftermath of the death of Jean Charles de Menezes, as well as defending other officers.

==== Funding investigation and resignation ====
In late 2007, the London Evening Standard levelled a series of accusation at Jasper of cronyism and corruption. Mayor Ken Livingstone suspended him while investigations were subsequently carried out, but always maintained a belief in Jasper's innocence, stating: "I believe this investigation will exonerate Lee Jasper and show this to be a shameful campaign. As the interests of London are best served by putting an end to this malignant political charade I have concluded that a full police investigation is the most authoritative way to end this story once and for all."

Although it was strongly recommended that improvements be made to the GLA's administrative procedures, Jasper was cleared of misconduct in January 2008 with the GLA asserting that: "The report has been issued today of the review of allegations of LDA corruption and collusion in improperly awarding funds made by the journalist Andrew Gilligan in the Evening Standard in a series of articles in December 2007. The report finds these to be unfounded. The charge of a 'tide of corruption' made by London Assembly member Richard Barnes in the Evening Standard on 13 December is therefore also false."

Jasper resigned on 4 March 2008 after the Evening Standard published e-mails of an intimate nature, written by Jasper to a woman involved with organisations that had received £100,000 in Greater London Authority grants and with whom Jasper had not declared a relationship. An Authority spokesman said: "Lee Jasper has stated that in light of material published today that he has tendered his resignation."

A GLA spokeswoman said: "The record of the GLA in dealing with racism in London has been outstanding. [...] The GLA is an exemplary authority achieving national recognition in the country in regard to equality and procurement. Lee Jasper played a leading role in regard to these, and no evidence has been presented for the criminal allegations presented by the Evening Standard."

Boris Johnson launched an extensive Forensic Audit Panel investigation to examine in detail all aspects of Jasper's decisions and actions while in office. That committee reported in July 2008 that Jasper had acted at all times within his remit as a Mayoral adviser, although the panel did express concern about two members of his staff responsible for the Carnival Showcase.

The most recent report, which was produced after a forensic 18-month independent investigation by the law firm DLA Piper and commissioned by the London Development Agency, examined all the fraud and corruption allegations made by the Evening Standard newspaper. The report published in June 2009 concluded that Jasper had not influenced the funding decisions of the LDA and that there was no evidence of fraud or corruption. However, it described Jasper's involvement in one body to receive funding to be "entirely inappropriate". According to a BBC report of the investigation, although Haworth-Maden said he found no evidence of fraud or corruption, he called for a number of administrative improvements at the GLA. His report found that Jasper failed to record declared interests to the "standards expected". He also found that Jasper's role in approving funding was "inappropriate given his interests" in a number of cases.

== Controversy ==
Jasper tweeted in April 2012 that "the white man is the most violent ethnicity in world history, taking death to an industrial scale". In September 2013, he described the armed mugging of Kathryn Blair as "chickens coming home to roost".

In April 2013, Jasper received press attention for remarking that "black people in Europe and UK can't be racist".

In October 2017, he tweeted that "whites are responsible for more genocides that (sic) all the other people's combined". That same month, he tweeted that "we're colonising Europe baby" because white "man can't breed".

In January 2018, he tweeted that the "abuse of women and children" by Pakistani men was instead an "abusive aspect of working class British culture", created by societal "grooming" of the perpetrators.

In 2018, Jasper was suspended by Twitter after he made a tweet comparing LGBT councillors to the KKK. He was also accused of abusing anti-FGM campaigner Nimco Ali online, describing her in 2017 as "one fucked up negro".

== Personal life ==
Jasper resides in Lambeth, south London, and has nine children and four grandchildren. He has written about how his youngest son was stabbed in 2010 while trying to break up a fight.

== Awards ==
In 2003, Jasper was named in the top ten by 100 Black Britons. In 2010, the NUS Black Students Campaign awarded him the National Black Achievers Award for Life Time Achievement in recognition of his outstanding contribution to the struggle for racial justice, and the Life Time Achievement Award for his contribution toward challenging racism in higher education. In July 2010, he was awarded a Pride of the Motherland Award (Africa) at The O2 Arena by the National Consortium of African Student Societies. In July 2017, C.H Hub Awards awarded Jasper their Legend Award in recognition of his 30-year contribution to social justice.
