= John Ross (blogger) =

British academic and economic commentator

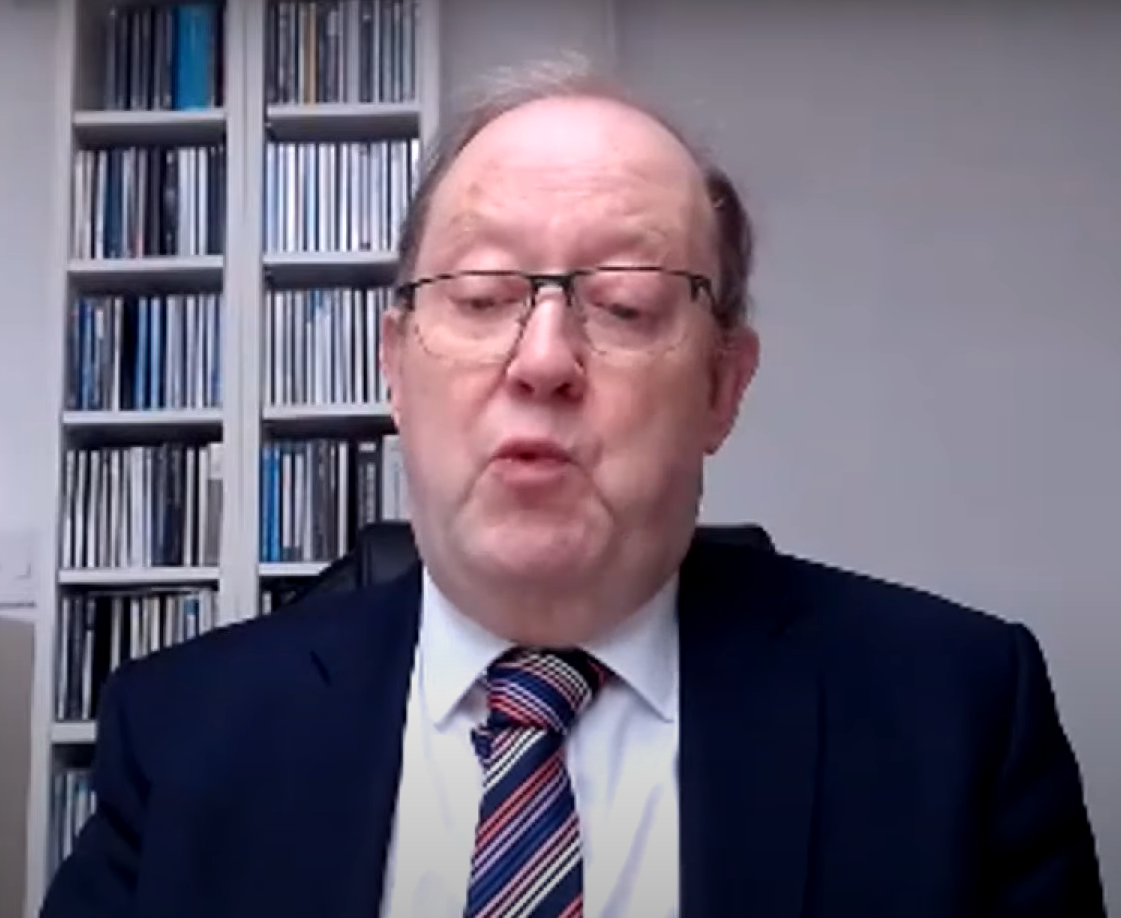
Ross in 2022

John Ross is a British economist and blogger, known for his leadership of the Trotskyist party Socialist Action and his support for the Chinese government. He is better known in China as his Chinese name Luo Siyi (Chinese: 罗思义). Ross currently contributes to multiple Chinese news media including CGTN and China Daily.

== Socialist Action, Labour and Ken Livingstone ==
Ross joined the Trotskyist International Marxist Group (IMG) in the late 1960s. His party name in the IMG was Alan Jones. He worked with Bob Pennington to form the IMG Opposition Group. Ross was a central figure in the leadership of the IMG in the 1970s and early 1980s. In December 1982, the IMG renamed itself the Socialist League. The group fully entered the Labour Party and in 1983 began publishing the Socialist Action newspaper, by which name the League was often known.

Ross wrote the book Thatcher and Friends - the Anatomy of the Tory Party (1983).

Ross gradually lost the support of much of its membership. Ross was leader of one of three groups which emerged from the crisis of this group in the mid-1980s, the one which retained the name Socialist Action. They left the Fourth International and increasingly ceased to function as a normal left-wing group. The group adopted an entryist strategy "to protect members from any potential Militant-style purge".

In the 1990s, according to rival Trotskyist group the Alliance for Workers' Liberty, Ross lived in Russia.

SA's leaders became advisors to Labour Party politician Ken Livingstone. Running as an independent candidate for Mayor of London in 2000, Livingstone's decision to appoint members of Socialist Action to his administration during his first term drew criticism in the media, including accusations of cronyism. Ross was appointed Livingstone's Policy Director of Economic and Business Policy. In 2007 Livingstone changed the GLA rules so that his eight key advisers, four associated with SA (including John Ross and the late Redmond O'Neill), who as temporary appointments would not normally have been entitled to severance pay, received an average of £200,000 each.

Following Jeremy Corbyn's election as Labour Party leader and Leader of the Opposition in 2015, Ross was linked to Corbyn's inner circle.

== China ==
In the 2010s and 2020s, John Ross has been a prominent supporter of the Chinese government and its economic policies. He featured in a Chinese government advertising billboard video in Times Square in 2016 asserting the country's claim over the South China Sea, frequently appears on Chinese state media platform China Daily and has appeared on Chinese state media platform CGTN to blame Britain for the clashes related to pro-democracy protests in Hong Kong.

He is the author of The Great Chess Game? A New Perspective on China's Destiny (2016) and the journal article "Management Philosophy of the Greater London Authority". He is a columnist in English at the state media China Internet Information Center and is translated into Chinese at Guancha.cn and Sina Finance Opinion Leaders.

He is a senior fellow at Chongyang Institute for Financial Studies at Renmin University of China.

In a video with Jodie Evans of Code Pink, he describes allegations of persecution of Uyghurs in China as “farcical” and a “total lie.” He has written:

If the real meaning of the term ‘human rights’ is used, it is evident that China has the best human rights record in the world — and those words are carefully chosen. … What is particularly striking is the factual contrast between what China has achieved and the laughable claim of the U.S. to a superior human rights record.

In the New Statesman, left-wing journalist Paul Mason identified Ross and his paper Socialist Action as "committed to whitewashing China's authoritarian form of capitalism".
