= National Policy Forum =

Policy-making wing of the British Labour Party

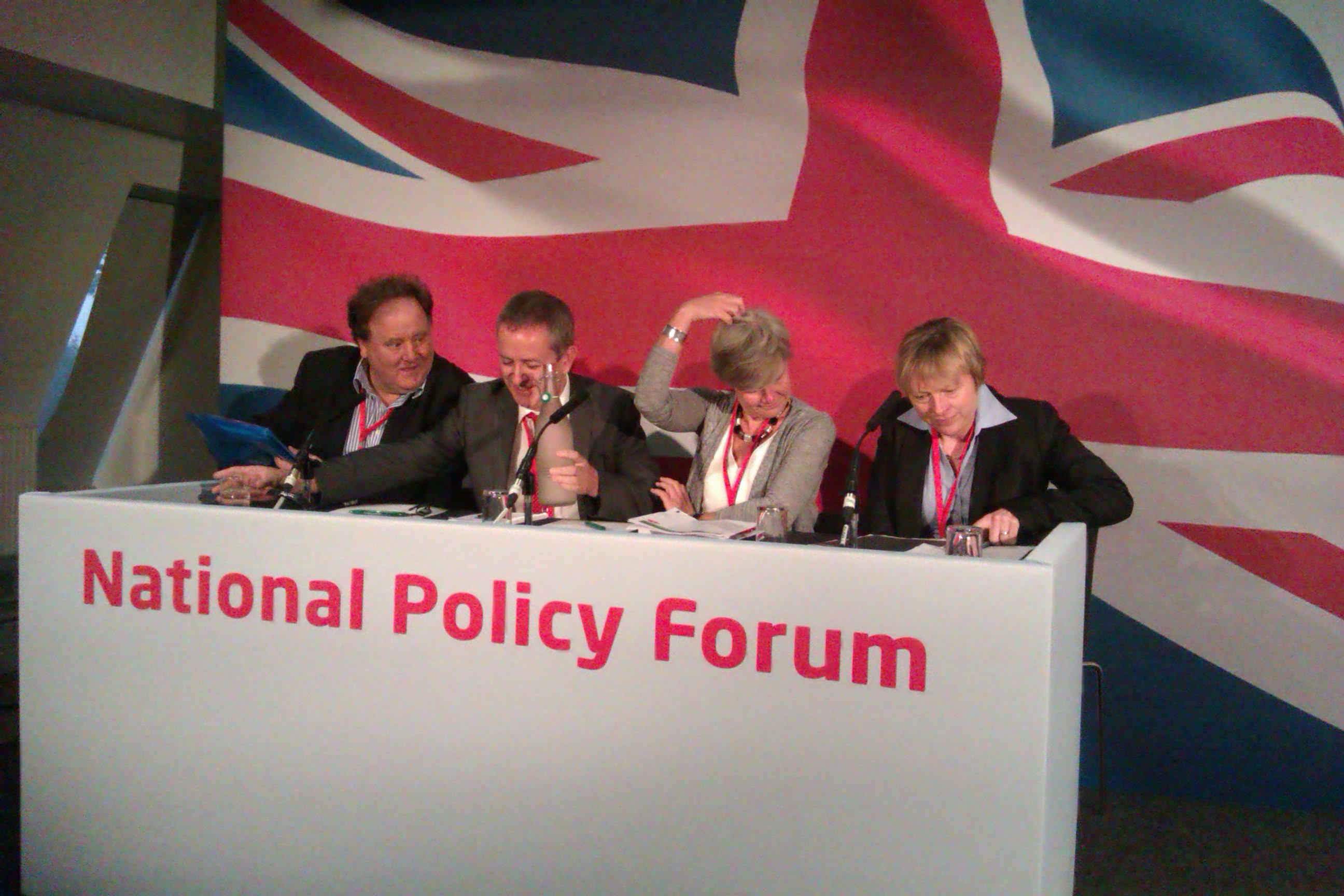
- Top table of the National Policy Forum in 2012
- Abbreviation: NPF
- Predecessor: Provisional National Policy Forum
- Founder: Tony Blair
- Location: United Kingdom
- Members: 204 representatives (2018)
- Parent organization: Labour Party
- Website: www.policyforum.labour.org.uk

The National Policy Forum (NPF) of the British Labour Party is part of the policy-making system of the Party, set up by Leader Tony Blair as part of the Partnership in Power process. A Provisional National Policy Forum had been established by Blair's predecessor, John Smith, in May 1993.

The NPF is made up of 204 members representing parliament, devolved assemblies, local government, affiliated trade unions, socialist societies and others, and individual members of the Labour Party, who elect representatives through an all member ballot.

The body is responsible for overseeing policy development. It meets two or three weekends a year to discuss in detail documents produced by the policy commissions, of which there are five, jointly set up by the NPF, the Party's National Executive Committee and (under Blair) the Government. It submits three types of documents to Labour Party Conference: pre-decision consultative, final policy documents and an annual report on the work of the policy commissions.

There are also policy forums set up for the English regions and for Scotland and Wales, feeding into the National Policy Forum and discussing more local matters.

The Joint Policy Committee acts as a steering group for the National Policy Forum.

== Membership of the National Policy Forum ==
As of 2018, there were 204 members:

Elected, for two year terms:

- Constituency Labour Parties - 55
- Affiliated Trade Unions - 30
- Regional Conferences/Policy Forums - 22
- Local Government Councillors - 10
- Socialist societies - 3
- BAME Labour - 4
- Members of Parliament - 9
- Members of the European Parliament - 6
- Labour Students - 1
- Members of the House of Lords - 2
- Northern Ireland Labour - 1
- Labour International - 1
- LGBT Labour - 1
- Disabled Members Group - 1

Ex officio:

- Welsh Policy Forum officers - 4
- Scottish Policy Forum officers - 4
- Government/Shadow Cabinet - 8
- Co-operative Party - 2
- General Secretary of the Co-operative Party - 1
- National Executive Committee - 39

Non-voting

- one representative of all otherwise non-represented socialist societies
