= Redmond O'Neill =

British political activist

Redmond O'Neill (8 February 1954 – 21 October 2009) was a British political activist.

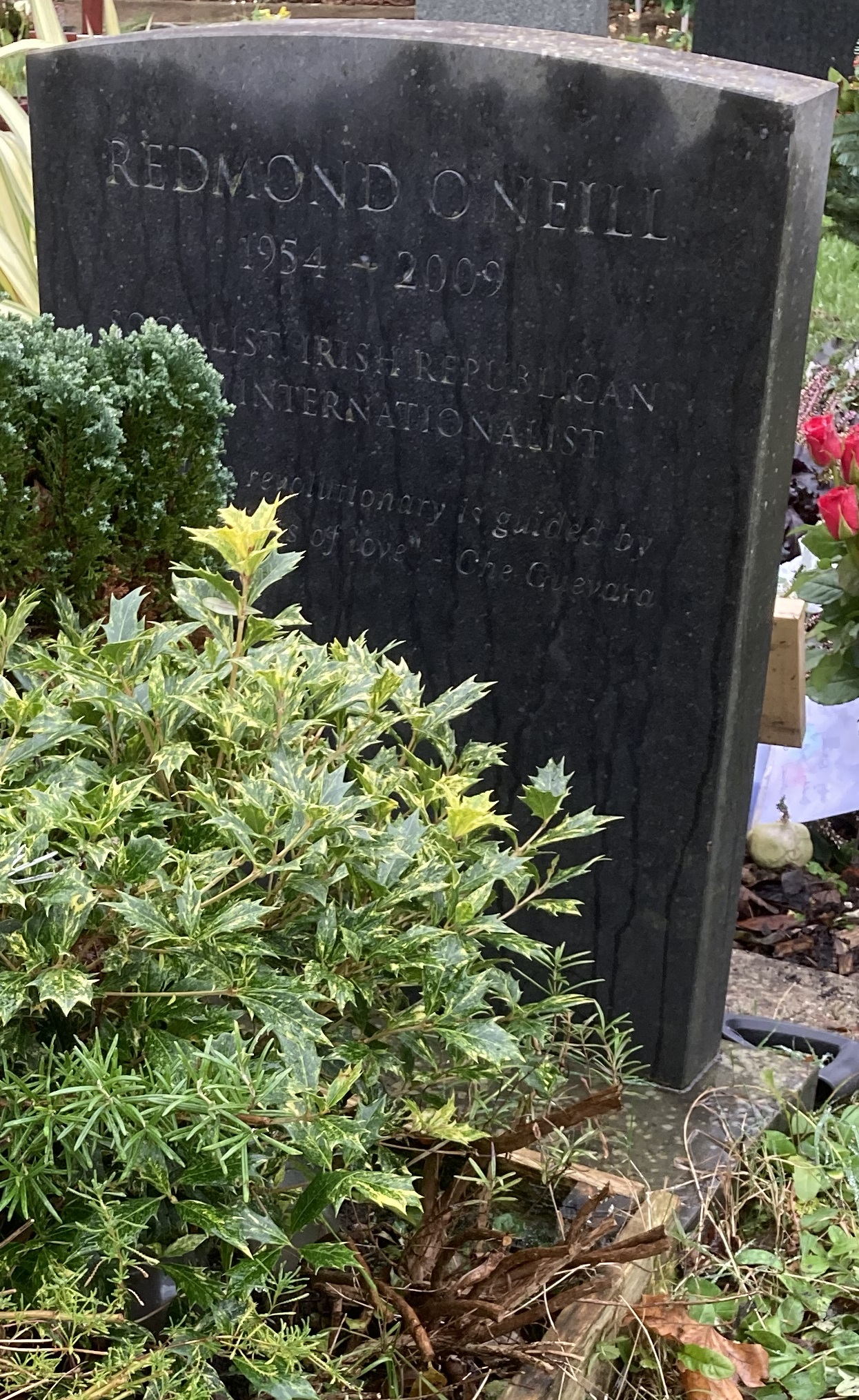
Grave of Redmond O'Neill in Highgate Cemetery

Born in London to an Irish family from County Tipperary, O'Neill studied at Sussex University, where he joined the Trotskyist International Marxist Group (IMG). One faction in the IMG later became Socialist Action, and O'Neill was recognised as its leader. Under his leadership, the group opposed the Gulf War and founded the Anti-Racist Alliance.

In 1987, O'Neill met Labour Party hard left politician Ken Livingstone, and subsequently became his main advisor on Irish issues. In the 1990s, he met and married Kate Hudson, who later became the Chair of the Campaign for Nuclear Disarmament. In 2000, he was appointed as Mayor of London Ken Livingstone's deputy chief of staff, responsible for transport, trade union relations, public affairs and editing The Londoner newsletter. He launched a major celebration of St Patrick's Day in London in 2002, took the lead on congestion charging, and developed links with Hugo Chavez, exchanging transport expertise for cheap fuel.

O'Neill's role in Socialist Action was widely reported in the press in advance of the 2008 London mayoral election, with the Sunday Times describing allegations that the group remained active as suggesting "Marxist infiltration". A former member of the organisation claimed that O'Neill had operated under the pseudonym "Lark".

Following O'Neill's death, at the age of 55, Gerry Adams described him as a "very dedicated and energetic supporter of Irish reunification, of the peace process and of justice and equality campaigns", the Foreign Minister of Venezuela called him "an intimate friend, a companion in the fight for equality and justice". Ma Hui, deputy head of the International Liaison Department of the Chinese Communist Party referred to his efforts "to promote and encourage better understanding and mutually beneficial cooperation between Beijing and London". Cuba's UK Ambassador said O'Neill "will forever be remembered as an example of dedication to the anti-imperialist struggle". Member of Parliament John McDonnell stated that "Redmond's contribution to our movement will be remembered with immense respect." On 24 October 2009 the demonstration in Trafalgar Square against Britain's involvement in Afghanistan held a minute's silence marking O'Neill’s death.

He is buried on the eastern side of Highgate Cemetery.
